= 2009 FC Lokomotiv Astana season =

FC Lokomotiv Astana
2009 season
- Chairman: Kaisar Bekenov
- Manager: Vakhid Masudov (1 January - 16 February); Sergei Yuran (caretaker) (from 16 February)
- Stadium: Astana Arena
- Premier League: 2nd
- Kazakhstan Cup: Second Round vs Aktobe
- Top goalscorer: League: Andrey Tikhonov (12); All: Andrey Tikhonov (12)
- Highest home attendance: 8,500 vs Aktobe (19 June 2009)
- Lowest home attendance: 1,500 vs Kazakhmys (1 November 2009)
- Average home league attendance: 4,215 (1 November 2009)
Home colours	Away colours

The 2009 Lokomotiv Astana season was the club's first season, during which they played in the Kazakhstan Premier League, the highest tier of association football in Kazakhstan. They finished the season in second place, but were denied a license by UEFA to play in the UEFA Europa League the following year. In the Kazakhstan Cup, Lokomotiv Astana were knocked out in the Second Round by FC Aktobe.

== Squad ==
As of match played 1 November 2009

No.	Name	Nationality	Position	Date of birth (age)	Signed from	Signed in	Apps.	Goals
Goalkeepers
1	David Loria	(Kazakhstan)	GK	31 October 1981 (aged 28)	loan from Spartak Nalchik	2009	15	0
24	Denis Tolebaev	(Kazakhstan)	GK	7 February 1987 (aged 22)	Academy	2009	0	0
32	Roman Nesterenko	(Kazakhstan)	GK	2 March 1977 (aged 32)	Kaisar	2009	18	0
71	Maksat Seydahmet	(Kazakhstan)	GK	17 November 1989 (aged 19)	Academy	2009	0	0
90	Akhan Inkarbekov	(Kazakhstan)	GK	26 June 1990 (aged 19)	Academy	2009	0	0
Defenders
3	Pavel Ateoschenko	(Kazakhstan)	DF	13 July 1989 (aged 20)	Academy	2009	0	0
4	Patrick Ovie	(Nigeria)	DF	2 June 1978 (aged 31)	-	2009	19	1
5	Igor Avdeyev	(Kazakhstan)	DF	10 January 1973 (aged 36)	Kairat	2009	11	1
13	Arken Jakubbekov	(Kazakhstan)	DF	6 February 1989 (aged 20)	Academy	2009	0	0
19	Rinat Abdulin	(Kazakhstan)	DF	14 April 1982 (aged 27)	Kairat	2009	18	1
34	Sergey Yakushin	(Kazakhstan)	DF	8 March 1989 (aged 20)	Academy	2009	0	0
36	Timur Kasymov	(Kazakhstan)	DF	1 March 1989 (aged 20)	Academy	2009	0	0
43	Ussov Beekzat	(Kazakhstan)	DF	23 May 1991 (aged 18)	Academy	2009	0	0
55	Damir Dautov	(Kazakhstan)	DF	3 March 1990 (aged 19)	Academy	2009	22	1
69	Olzhas Kerimzhanov	(Kazakhstan)	DF	16 May 1989 (aged 20)	Academy	2009	0	0
70	Maksim Samchenko	(Kazakhstan)	DF	5 May 1979 (aged 30)	Shakhter Karagandy	2009	20	0
Midfielders
2	Maksat Baizhanov	(Kazakhstan)	MF	6 August 1984 (aged 25)	Kaisar	2009	20	0
6	Marat Shakhmetov	(Kazakhstan)	MF	6 February 1989 (aged 20)	Alma-Ata	2009	14	0
7	Ruslan Sakhalbaev	(Kazakhstan)	MF	27 June 1984 (aged 25)	Megasport	2009	20	2
8	Kairat Ashirbekov	(Kazakhstan)	MF	21 October 1982 (aged 27)	Shakhter Karagandy	2009	14	4
9	Yegor Titov	(Russia)	MF	29 May 1976 (aged 33)	Khimki	2009	27	7
11	Andrey Tikhonov	(Russia)	MF	16 October 1970 (aged 39)	Krylia Sovetov	2009	28	12
12	Marko Mitrović	(Serbia)	MF	8 July 1978 (aged 31)	Megasport	2009	21	0
17	Timur Khalmuratov	(Kazakhstan)	MF	29 April 1986 (aged 23)		2009	0	0
20	Andrei Karpovich	(Kazakhstan)	MF	18 January 1981 (aged 28)	Dynamo Moscow	2009	25	2
21	Zhambyl Kukeyev	(Kazakhstan)	MF	20 September 1988 (aged 21)	Alma-Ata	2009	23	4
27	Nursultan Kenenov	(Kazakhstan)	MF	4 January 1990 (aged 19)	Academy	2009	0	0
40	Abzal Beisebekov	(Kazakhstan)	MF	30 November 1992 (aged 16)	Academy	2009	12	1
66	Victor Kryukov	(Kazakhstan)	MF	30 June 1990 (aged 19)	Academy	2009	0	0
80	Madiyar Muminov	(Kazakhstan)	MF	18 October 1980 (aged 29)	Megasport	2009	14	3
88	Dauren Sydykov	(Kazakhstan)	MF	20 April 1988 (aged 21)	Academy	2009	0	0
Forwards
10	Daniyar Khasenov	(Kazakhstan)	FW	1 August 1976 (aged 33)	Megasport	2009	4	2
15	Aleksandr Shatskikh	(Kazakhstan)	FW	21 January 1974 (aged 35)	Megasport	2009	3	3
16	Maksim Shatskikh	(Uzbekistan)	FW	30 August 1978 (aged 31)	Dynamo Kyiv	2009	15	10
18	Kanat Bolatov	(Kazakhstan)	FW	28 January 1990 (aged 19)	Academy	2009	0	0
28	Shyngyskhan Kudaybergenov	(Kazakhstan)	FW	2 February 1990 (aged 19)	Academy	2009	0	0
35	Arman Khalykov	(Kazakhstan)	FW	1 March 1990 (aged 19)	Academy	2009	0	0
37	Roman Pakholyuk	(Ukraine)	FW	20 September 1988 (aged 21)	Kaisar	2009	16	3
44	Asyl Senbayuly	(Kazakhstan)	FW	2 April 1990 (aged 19)	Academy	2009	0	0
77	Talgat Adyrbekov	(Kazakhstan)	FW	26 January 1989 (aged 20)	Academy	2009	3	0
Players that left during the season
14	Sergei Larin	(Kazakhstan)	MF	22 July 1986 (aged 23)	Alma-Ata	2009	2	0
23	Zakhar Korobov	(Kazakhstan)	DF	18 May 1988 (aged 21)	Academy	2009	3	0
33	Eduard Văluță	(Moldova)	FW	9 April 1979 (aged 30)	Naftovyk-Ukrnafta Okhtyrka	2009	2	0
99	Murat Suyumagambetov	(Kazakhstan)	FW	14 October 1983 (aged 26)	Shakhter Karagandy	2009	11	1

== Transfers ==
=== Winter ===
In: Note: Flags indicate national team as defined under FIFA eligibility rules; some limited exceptions apply. Players may hold more than one non-FIFA nationality.

No.	Pos.	Nation	Player
2	MF	KAZ	Maksat Baizhanov (from (Kazakhstan) Kaisar)
4	DF	NGA	Patrick Ovie
5	DF	KAZ	Igor Avdeyev (from (Kazakhstan) Kairat)
6	MF	KAZ	Marat Shakhmetov (from (Kazakhstan) Alma-Ata)
7	MF	KAZ	Ruslan Sakhalbaev (from (Kazakhstan) Megasport)
8	MF	KAZ	Kairat Ashirbekov (from (Kazakhstan) Shakhter Karagandy)
9	MF	RUS	Yegor Titov (from (Russia) Khimki)
10	FW	KAZ	Daniyar Khasenov (from (Kazakhstan) Megasport)
11	MF	RUS	Andrey Tikhonov (from (Russia) Krylia Sovetov)
12	MF	SRB	Marko Mitrović (from (Kazakhstan) Megasport)
15	FW	KAZ	Aleksandr Shatskikh (from (Kazakhstan) Megasport)
19	DF	KAZ	Rinat Abdulin (from (Kazakhstan) Kairat)
20	MF	KAZ	Andrei Karpovich (from (Russia) Dynamo Moscow)
21	MF	KAZ	Zhambyl Kukeyev (from (Kazakhstan) Alma-Ata)
23	DF	KAZ	Zakhar Korobov (from (Kazakhstan) Kairat)
32	GK	KAZ	Roman Nesterenko (from (Kazakhstan) Kaisar)
37	FW	UKR	Roman Pakholyuk (from (Kazakhstan) Kaisar)
70	DF	KAZ	Maksim Samchenko (from (Kazakhstan) Shakhter Karagandy)
80	MF	KAZ	Madiyar Muminov (from (Kazakhstan) Megasport)
99	FW	KAZ	Murat Suyumagambetov (from (Kazakhstan) Shakhter Karagandy)

Out: Note: Flags indicate national team as defined under FIFA eligibility rules; some limited exceptions apply. Players may hold more than one non-FIFA nationality.

No.	Pos.	Nation	Player

=== Summer ===
In: Note: Flags indicate national team as defined under FIFA eligibility rules; some limited exceptions apply. Players may hold more than one non-FIFA nationality.

No.	Pos.	Nation	Player
1	GK	KAZ	David Loria (loan from (Russia) Spartak Nalchik)
16	FW	UZB	Maksim Shatskikh (from (Ukraine) Dynamo Kyiv)

Out: Note: Flags indicate national team as defined under FIFA eligibility rules; some limited exceptions apply. Players may hold more than one non-FIFA nationality.

No.	Pos.	Nation	Player
1	GK	TKM	Ýewgeniý Naboýçenko
14	MF	KAZ	Sergei Larin (to (Kazakhstan) Atyrau)
23	DF	KAZ	Zachary Korobov (to (Kazakhstan) Zhetysu)
33	DF	MDA	Eduard Văluță
45	MF	KAZ	Dmitry Romanovsky
99	FW	KAZ	Murat Suyumagambetov (from (Kazakhstan) Ordabasy)

== Competitions ==
=== Premier League ===
==== Results summary ====
Overall								Home						Away					
Pld	W	D	L	GF	GA	GD	Pts	W	D	L	GF	GA	GD	W	D	L	GF	GA	GD
26	20	0	6	54	24	+30	60	11	0	2	29	10	+19	9	0	4	25	14	+11

Last updated: 1 November 2009.
Source: See Results

==== Results ====
8 March 2009 1	Kazakhmys	3 – 4	Lokomotiv Astana	Satbayev
17:00 (UTC+6)	A.Serikzhanov 7' (yellow card); G.Alekperzade 25'; F.Siminidi 32'	Report	Shatskikh 16', 61'; Abdulin 18'; D.Khasenov 40'; Z.Korobov (yellow card); Karpovich (yellow card); Suyumagambetov (yellow card)	Stadium: Kazakhmys Stadium; Attendance: 1,300; Referee: Igor Kister

14 March 2009 2	Kaisar	0 – 4	Lokomotiv Astana	Kyzylorda
(UTC+6)	Moskalenko (yellow card); Kutsov (yellow card)	Report	Tikhonov 29' (pen.), 83'; D.Khasenov 48'; Titov 90+'; Kukeyev (yellow card)	Stadium: Gani Muratbayev Stadium; Attendance: 4,000; Referee: Igor Hisamutdinov

21 March 2009 3	Lokomotiv Astana	1 – 0	Kyzylzhar	Almaty
(UTC+6)	Tikhonov 12' (pen.); Karpovich (yellow card); Abdulin (yellow card)	Report	Proskurin (yellow card)	Stadium: T.Ryskulov NEU Stadium; Attendance: 3,000; Referee: Victor Antonov

6 April 2009 4	Lokomotiv Astana	2 – 1	Atyrau	Almaty
(UTC+6)	Tikhonov 30', 53' (pen.); D.Dautov (yellow card); Karpovich (yellow card); Ovie (yellow card)	Report	A.Shakin 22'	Stadium: Central Stadium; Attendance: 3,000; Referee: Akmal Kholmatov

12 April 2009 5	Irtysh Pavlodar	0 – 1	Lokomotiv Astana	Pavlodar
(UTC+6)	Gumar (yellow card); Yurin (yellow card); Ivanov (yellow card)	Report	Kukeyev 81'; D.Dautov (yellow card); Samchenko (yellow card)	Stadium: Central Stadium; Attendance: 7,500; Referee: Ruslan Duzmambetov

19 April 2009 6	Lokomotiv Astana	4 – 0	Tobol	Almaty
(UTC+6)	Tikhonov 19' (pen.); Suyumagambetov 24'; Kukeyev 80'; Karpovich 83'; Titov (red card) 88'	Report	Mukanov (yellow card); Y.Baginski (yellow card); Kharabara (yellow card)	Stadium: Central Stadium; Attendance: 4,500; Referee: Pavel Saliy

30 April 2009 7	Taraz	1 – 2	Lokomotiv Astana	Taraz
(UTC+6)	Bagayev 77'	Report	Avdeyev 61'; Tikhonov 81'	Stadium: Central Stadium; Attendance: 5,500; Referee: Alexander Gueser

10 May 2009 8	Lokomotiv Astana	1 – 2	Shakhter Karagandy	Almaty
(UTC+6)	Beisebekov 62'; Karpovich (yellow card)	Report	Darabayev 22'; I.Mangutkin 54'; Kislitsyn (yellow card)	Stadium: Central Stadium; Attendance: 2,000; Referee: Igor Hisamutdinov

16 May 2009 9	Ordabasy	1 – 0	Lokomotiv Astana	Shymkent
(UTC+6)	Mukhtarov 17'	Report	Samchenko (yellow card); Abdulin (yellow card); Tikhonov (yellow card); Sakhalbaev (yellow card)	Stadium: Kazhymukan Munaitpasov Stadium; Attendance: 6,000; Referee: Artyom Kuchin

24 May 2009 10	Lokomotiv Astana	1 – 0	Zhetysu	Astana
(UTC+6)	Tikhonov 10'; Samchenko (yellow card); Karpovich (yellow card); Nesterenko (yellow card)	Report	Kamelov (yellow card); Travin (yellow card); Belić (yellow card) (yellow-red card) 63'	Stadium: Dynamo Stadium; Attendance: 2,500; Referee: Igor Aleshin

15 June 2009 11	Vostok	1 – 2	Lokomotiv Astana	Oskemen
(UTC+6)	A.Moltusinov 34'	Report	D.Dautov 40' (yellow card); Sakhalbaev 89'; Mitrović (yellow card)	Stadium: Vostok Stadium; Attendance: 2,000; Referee: Igor Hisamutdinov

19 June 2009 12	Lokomotiv Astana	0 – 2	Aktobe	Astana
(UTC+6)	Samchenko (yellow card) (yellow-red card) 53'; Muminov (yellow card)	Report	Tleshev 4', 63'; Khairullin (yellow card) (yellow-red card) 90'; Chichulin (yellow card); M.Semyonov (yellow card)	Stadium: Kazhymukan Munaitpasov Stadium; Attendance: 8,500; Referee: Bobrov

28 June 2009 13	Lokomotiv Astana	2 – 1	Okzhetpes	Astana
(UTC+6)	E.Nurgaliev 25' (o.g.); Tikhonov 32' (pen.); Kukeyev (yellow card); Shatskikh (yellow card)	Report	Krutskevich 75'; E.Bekmuhayev (yellow card); E.Nurgaliev (yellow card)	Stadium: Kazhymukan Munaitpasov Stadium; Attendance: 7,000; Referee: Rakhimbaev

13 July 2009 14	Okzhetpes	1 – 5	Lokomotiv Astana	Kokshetau
(UTC+6)	Malkov 12' (pen.); Y.Mokrousov (yellow card); Krutskevich (yellow card); S.Dosmanbetov (yellow card)	Report	Kukeyev 7'; Tikhonov 28', 35'; Karpovich 37' (yellow card); Shatskikh 82'; Muminov (yellow card); Shakhmetov (yellow card)	Stadium: Okzhetpes Stadium; Attendance: 2,500; Referee: Victor Antonov

25 September 2009 15	Aktobe	0 – 1	Lokomotiv Astana	Aktobe
(UTC+6)	Lavrik (yellow card); Kenzhesariyev (yellow card) (yellow-red card) 72'	Report	Shatskikh 7'; Baizhanov (yellow card); Samchenko (yellow card); Ashirbekov (yellow card); Sakhalbaev (yellow card)	Stadium: Central Stadium; Attendance: 10,000; Referee: Pavel Saliy

26 July 2009 16	Lokomotiv Astana	3 – 2	Vostok	Astana
(UTC+6)	Shatskikh 17', 62'; Titov 78'; Abdulin (yellow card)	Report	S.Rogachev 36'; Erbes 88'	Stadium: Central Stadium; Attendance: 3,00; Referee: Suyunov

2 August 2009 17	Zhetysu	1 – 0	Lokomotiv Astana	Taldykorgan
(UTC+6)	Azovskiy 47'; Z.Korobov (yellow card); Kumisbekov (yellow card); Branković (yellow card)	Report	Shatskikh (yellow card)	Stadium: Zhetysu Stadium; Attendance: 4,000; Referee: Ruslan Duzmambetov

8 August 2009 18	Lokomotiv Astana	3 – 1	Ordabasy	Astana
(UTC+6)	Muminov 30' (yellow card); Shatskikh 59'; Ashirbekov 79'	Report	Nusserbayev 65' (yellow card); Mukhtarov (yellow card); Suyumagambetov (yellow card)	Stadium: Kazhymukan Munaitpasov Stadium; Attendance: 6,000; Referee: Igor Aleshin

16 August 2009 19	Shakhter Karagandy	4 – 2	Lokomotiv Astana	Karaganda
(UTC+6)	Bogdanov 45+' (yellow card); Finonchenko 57'; Kostyuk 87'; I.Shevchenko 90+4'; Perić (yellow card); Kislitsyn (yellow card); Đorđević (yellow card)	Report	Shatskikh 30' (yellow card); Tikhonov 65'; Abdulin (red card) 86'; Pakholyuk (yellow card); Karpovich (yellow card)	Stadium: Shakhter Stadium; Attendance: 16,000; Referee: Pavel Saliy

23 August 2009 20	Lokomotiv Astana	4 – 1	Taraz	Astana
(UTC+6)	Titov 27'; Pakholyuk 28', 62'; Ovie 55'	Report	A.Anarmetov 22'; I.Ilin (yellow card)	Stadium: Kazhymukan Munaitpasov Stadium; Attendance: 6,000; Referee: Anatoly Vishnichenko

30 August 2009 21	Tobol	1 – 0	Lokomotiv Astana	Kostanay
(UTC+6)	Zhumaskaliyev 65'; Mukanov (yellow card)	Report	D.Dautov (yellow card); Ovie (yellow card); Titov (yellow card)	Stadium: Central Stadium; Attendance: 8,000; Referee: Igor Hisamutdinov

14 September 2009 22	Lokomotiv Astana	2 – 0	Irtysh Pavlodar	Astana
(UTC+6)	Muminov 27'; M.Shatskikh 62'; Samchenko (yellow card)	Report	K.Zotov (yellow card); Ivanov (yellow card)	Stadium: Kazhymukan Munaitpasov Stadium; Attendance: 5,000; Referee: Sergey Pasko

20 September 2009 23	Atyrau	1 – 2	Lokomotiv Astana	Atyrau
(UTC+6)	Zubko 46'; Sangare (yellow card); Dzholchiyev (yellow card)	Report	Titov 65', 90'; Karpovich (yellow card)	Stadium: Munaishy Stadium; Attendance: 7,000; Referee: Aydin Rakhimbaev

29 September 2009 24	Kyzylzhar	0 – 2	Lokomotiv Astana	Petropavl
(UTC+6)	N.Solomin (yellow card) (yellow-red card) 90'; A.Ustinov (yellow card); S.Shulyak (yellow card)	Report	Kukeyev 16'; Muminov 55'; Mitrović (yellow card)	Stadium: Zhastar Stadium; Attendance: 3,000; Referee: Bolat Karlibaev

25 October 2009 25	Lokomotiv Astana	3 – 0	Kaisar	Astana
(UTC+6)	Pakholyuk 22'; M.Shatskikh 52', 80'; Shakhmetov (yellow card)	Report		Stadium: Astana Arena; Attendance: 2,800; Referee: Kairat Slambekov

1 November 2009 26	Lokomotiv Astana	3 – 0	Kazakhmys	Astana
(UTC+6)	M.Shatskikh 11'; Ashirbekov 67' (yellow card); Titov 78'; Karpovich (yellow card); Mitrović (yellow card)	Report	E.Iskakov (yellow card)	Stadium: Astana Arena; Attendance: 1,500; Referee: Pavel Saliy

==== Table ====
Pos	Team	Pld	W	D	L	GF	GA	GD	Pts	Qualification or relegation
1	Aktobe (C)	26	21	2	3	65	19	+46	65	Qualification for the Champions League second qualifying round
2	Lokomotiv (Note: Lokomotiv Astana were denied UEFA license.)	26	20	0	6	54	24	+30	60	
3	Shakhter Karagandy	26	18	3	5	50	18	+32	57	Qualification for the Europa League first qualifying round
4	Tobol	26	14	9	3	54	23	+31	51	Qualification for the Europa League first qualifying round
5	Zhetysu	26	13	5	8	33	26	+7	44	

Source: kff.kz (in Russian)
Rules for classification: 1st points; 2nd overall wins; 3rd goal difference; 4th goals scored.
(C) Champions

=== Kazakhstan Cup ===
25 April 2009 First Round	Gefest	0 – 2	Lokomotiv Astana	Karaganda
(UTC+6)	Jubanov (yellow card) 62'	Report	Ashirbekov 6', 31'	Stadium: Shakhter Stadium; Attendance: 500; Referee: Aleshin

20 May 2009 Second Round 1st leg	Aktobe	1 – 0	Lokomotiv Astana	Aktobe
(UTC+6)	Tleshev 37'; Golovskoy (yellow card); Lavrik (yellow card)	Report	Karpovich (yellow card) (yellow-red card) 73'; Kukeyev (yellow card); Mitrović (yellow card); Ashirbekov (yellow card)	Stadium: Central Stadium; Attendance: 12,000; Referee: Bobrov

23 June 2009 Second Round 2nd leg	Lokomotiv Astana	2 – 1 (a.e.t.) (2 – 2 (a) agg.)	Aktobe	Astana
(UTC+6)	Sakhalbaev 55'; Shatskikh 65'; Nesterenko (yellow card); D.Dautov (yellow card)	Report	Tleshev 13' (yellow card); Kenzhesariyev (yellow card) (yellow-red card) 73'	Stadium: Kazhymukan Munaitpasov Stadium; Attendance: 7,000; Referee: Gauser

== Squad statistics ==
As of match played 1 November 2009

=== Appearances and goals ===
No.	Pos	Nat	Player	Total		Premier League		Kazakhstan Cup	
No.	Pos	Nat	Player	Apps	Goals	Apps	Goals	Apps	Goals
1	GK	(Kazakhstan) KAZ	David Loria	15	0	12	0	3	0
2	MF	(Kazakhstan) KAZ	Maksat Baizhanov	20	0	8+11	0	0+1	0
4	DF	(Nigeria) NGA	Patrick Ovie	19	1	16+1	1	2	0
5	DF	(Kazakhstan) KAZ	Igor Avdeyev	11	1	8+2	1	1	0
6	MF	(Kazakhstan) KAZ	Marat Shakhmetov	14	0	12+1	0	1	0
7	MF	(Kazakhstan) KAZ	Ruslan Sakhalbaev	20	2	1+17	1	0+2	1
8	MF	(Kazakhstan) KAZ	Kairat Ashirbekov	14	4	6+5	2	3	2
9	MF	(Russia) RUS	Yegor Titov	27	6	24	6	3	0
10	FW	(Kazakhstan) KAZ	Daniyar Khasenov	4	2	3+1	2	0	0
11	MF	(Russia) RUS	Andrey Tikhonov	28	12	25	12	3	0
12	MF	(Serbia) SRB	Marko Mitrović	21	0	14+4	0	3	0
15	FW	(Kazakhstan) KAZ	Aleksandr Shatskikh	3	3	2	2	1	1
16	FW	(Uzbekistan) UZB	Maksim Shatskikh	15	10	15	10	0	0
19	DF	(Kazakhstan) KAZ	Rinat Abdulin	18	1	13+3	1	2	0
20	MF	(Kazakhstan) KAZ	Andrei Karpovich	25	2	23	2	2	0
21	MF	(Kazakhstan) KAZ	Zhambyl Kukeyev	23	4	18+3	4	2	0
32	GK	(Kazakhstan) KAZ	Roman Nesterenko	18	0	14+1	0	3	0
37	FW	(Ukraine) UKR	Roman Pakholyuk	16	3	13+3	3	0	0
40	MF	(Kazakhstan) KAZ	Abzal Beisebekov	12	1	4+5	1	1+2	0
55	DF	(Kazakhstan) KAZ	Damir Dautov	22	1	16+3	1	3	0
70	DF	(Kazakhstan) KAZ	Maksim Samchenko	20	0	18	0	2	0
77	FW	(Kazakhstan) KAZ	Talgat Adyrbekov	3	0	0+3	0	0	0
80	MF	(Kazakhstan) KAZ	Madiyar Muminov	14	3	11+2	3	1	0
Players who appeared for Lokomotiv Astana that left during the season:
14	MF	(Kazakhstan) KAZ	Sergei Larin	2	0	0+1	0	0+1	0
23	DF	(Kazakhstan) KAZ	Zakhar Korobov	3	0	3	0	0	0
33	MF	(Moldova) MDA	Eduard Văluță	2	0	1+1	0	0	0
99	FW	(Kazakhstan) KAZ	Murat Suyumagambetov	11	1	4+5	1	2	0

=== Goal scorers ===
Place	Position	Nation	Number	Name	Premier League	Kazakhstan Cup	Total
1	MF	(Russia)	11	Andrey Tikhonov	12	0	12
2	FW	(Uzbekistan)	16	Maksim Shatskikh	10	0	10
3	MF	(Russia)	7	Yegor Titov	6	0	6
4	MF	(Kazakhstan)	21	Zhambyl Kukeyev	4	0	4
4	MF	(Kazakhstan)	8	Kairat Ashirbekov	2	2	4
6	MF	(Kazakhstan)	80	Madiyar Muminov	3	0	3
6	FW	(Ukraine)	37	Roman Pakholyuk	3	0	3
6	FW	(Kazakhstan)	15	Aleksandr Shatskikh	2	1	3
9	FW	(Kazakhstan)	10	Daniyar Khasenov	2	0	2
9	MF	(Kazakhstan)	20	Andrei Karpovich	2	0	2
9	MF	(Kazakhstan)	7	Ruslan Sakhalbaev	1	1	2
12	DF	(Kazakhstan)	19	Rinat Abdulin	1	0	1
12	FW	(Kazakhstan)	99	Murat Suyumagambetov	1	0	1
12	DF	(Kazakhstan)	5	Igor Avdeyev	1	0	1
12	MF	(Kazakhstan)	40	Abzal Beisebekov	1	0	1
12	DF	(Kazakhstan)	55	Damir Dautov	1	0	1
12	DF	(Nigeria)	4	Patrick Ovie	1	0	1
12				Own goal	1	0	1
				TOTALS	54	4	58

=== Clean sheets ===
Place	Position	Nation	Number	Name	Premier League	Kazakhstan Cup	Total
1	GK	(Kazakhstan)	32	Roman Nesterenko	6	1	7
2	GK	(Kazakhstan)	1	David Loria	4	0	4
				TOTALS	10	1	11

=== Disciplinary record ===
Number	Nation	Position	Name	Premier League		Kazakhstan Cup		Total	
Number	Nation	Position	Name	Booked	Sent off (straight red)	Booked	Sent off (straight red)	Booked	Sent off (straight red)
2	(Kazakhstan)	MF	Maksat Baizhanov	1	0	0	0	1	0
4	(Nigeria)	DF	Patrick Ovie	2	0	0	0	2	0
6	(Kazakhstan)	DF	Marat Shakhmetov	4	0	0	0	4	0
7	(Kazakhstan)	MF	Ruslan Sakhalbaev	2	0	0	0	2	0
8	(Kazakhstan)	MF	Kairat Ashirbekov	2	0	1	0	3	0
9	(Russia)	MF	Yegor Titov	1	1	0	0	1	1
11	(Russia)	MF	Andrey Tikhonov	1	0	0	0	1	0
12	(Serbia)	MF	Marko Mitrović	3	0	1	0	4	0
16	(Uzbekistan)	FW	Maksim Shatskikh	1	0	0	0	1	0
19	(Kazakhstan)	DF	Rinat Abdulin	3	1	0	0	3	1
20	(Kazakhstan)	MF	Andrei Karpovich	9	0	2	1	11	1
21	(Kazakhstan)	MF	Zhambyl Kukeyev	2	0	1	0	3	0
32	(Kazakhstan)	GK	Roman Nesterenko	1	0	1	0	2	0
37	(Ukraine)	FW	Roman Pakholyuk	1	0	0	0	1	0
55	(Kazakhstan)	DF	Damir Dautov	4	0	1	0	5	0
70	(Kazakhstan)	DF	Maksim Samchenko	5	1	0	0	50	1
80	(Kazakhstan)	MF	Madiyar Muminov	3	0	0	0	3	0
Players who left Lokomotiv Astana during the season:
23	(Kazakhstan)	DF	Zakhar Korobov	1	0	0	0	1	0
99	(Kazakhstan)	FW	Murat Suyumagambetov	1	0	0	0	1	0
			TOTALS	47	3	7	1	54	4
