= David Loriya =

Kazakhstani footballer

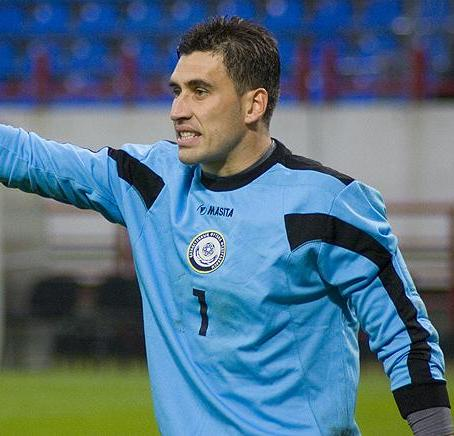

Personal information
- Full name: David Grigoryevich Loriya
- Date of birth: 31 October 1981 (age 45)
- Place of birth: Tselinograd, Soviet Union, Kazakh SSR
- Height: 1.86 m (6 ft 1 in)
- Position: Goalkeeper

Senior career*
Years	Team	Apps	(Gls)
1997	Okzhetpes	1	(0)
1998–2002	Zhenis Astana	70	(0)
2003	Esil	7	(0)
2004–2008	Shakhter Karagandy	112	(0)
2006	→ Astana (loan)	24	(0)
2007	→ Halmstads BK (loan)	7	(0)
2009	Spartak Nalchik	2	(0)
2009	→ Lokomotiv Astana (loan)	12	(0)
2010–2012	Irtysh Pavlodar	55	(0)
2012–2013	Çaykur Rizespor	33	(0)
2013–2014	Kairat	16	(0)
2014–2015	Karşıyaka	8	(0)
2015–2017	Irtysh Pavlodar	83	(0)
2018	Ordabasy	7	(0)
2018	Kairat	1	(0)
2019	Okzhetpes	0	(0)

International career
2000–2017	Kazakhstan	46	(0)

Managerial career
- 2019–2020: Shakhter Karagandy (sporting director)
- 2020–2021: Astana (sporting director)
- * Club domestic league appearances and goals

David Grigoryevich Loriya (Russian: Давид Григорьевич Лория; born 31 October 1981) is a retired Kazakhstani football goalkeeper of Georgian Jewish descent.

== Career ==
=== Trials at Eredivisie clubs ===
On 14 July 2007 Loriya had a week's trial at PSV Eindhoven. PSV's coach Ronald Koeman was impressed by David's performance in Belgium 0-0 Kazakhstan EURO qualifier opener back in August 2006.

On 24 July 2007 he also had a trial at Sparta Rotterdam. Neither club signed him, though David performed well during the trials

=== Allsvenskan and Halmstads BK ===
In 2007 Halmstads BK goalkeeper Magnus Bahne got injured and missed the rest of the season, Halmstad then only had one fit goalkeeper, making the club looking for a new goalkeeper for the remainder of the season and the choice became Kazakhstan international David Loriya. However, his Scandinavian journey did not last long and returned home shortly after playing only 7 games.

Loriya's contract was terminated in June 2014 before going on to sign with Karşıyaka.

=== Kairat ===
On 24 August 2018, Loriya signed for FC Kairat as a free agent, on a short-term contract until the end of the 2018 season.

=== International career ===
Loriya represented Kazakhstan at U21 level when they qualified to U21 World Cup 1999 in Nigeria. Seventeen-year-old David was the youngest player of that team. He received his first cap for Kazakhstan senior team on 26 May 2000 in a friendly against Syria at the age of 18, putting a record as the youngest player. This record was broken by Sergei Larin after five years. Loriya represented Kazakhstan in World Cup 2002, World Cup 2006, Euro 2008 and World Cup 2010 qualifiers.

=== Retirement ===
After retiring from professional football at the end of the 2019 season, Loriya was appointed executive director of FC Astana on 9 October 2020.

== Personal ==
- Likes numbers 1 and 99, since his dad and grandfather played #9, 99 is a combination of both.
- He is nicknamed "Dato" in Kazakhstan

== Career statistics ==
=== Club ===
As of match played 27 October 2018

Appearances and goals by club, season and competition
Club	Season	League			National Cup		League Cup		Continental		Other		Total	
Club	Season	Division	Apps	Goals	Apps	Goals	Apps	Goals	Apps	Goals	Apps	Goals	Apps	Goals
Avtomobilist	1997	Kazakhstan Premier League	1	0			–		–		–		1	0
Zhenis Astana	1998	Kazakhstan Premier League	3	0			-		-		-		3	0
Zhenis Astana	1999	Kazakhstan Premier League	7	0			-		-		-		7	0
Zhenis Astana	2000	Kazakhstan Premier League	12	0			-		-		-		12	0
Zhenis Astana	2001	Kazakhstan Premier League	22	0			-		-		-		22	0
Zhenis Astana	2002	Kazakhstan Premier League	16	0			-		-		-		16	0
Zhenis Astana	Total		60	0			-	-	-	-	-	-	60	0
Esil	2003	Kazakhstan Premier League	7	0			–		–		–		7	0
Shakhter Karagandy	2004	Kazakhstan Premier League	35	0			-		-		-		35	0
Shakhter Karagandy	2005	Kazakhstan Premier League	30	0			-		-		-		30	0
Shakhter Karagandy	2006	Kazakhstan Premier League	0	0			-		-		-		0	0
Shakhter Karagandy	2007	Kazakhstan Premier League	18	0			-		-		-		18	0
Shakhter Karagandy	2008	Kazakhstan Premier League	29	0			-		2	0	-		31	0
Shakhter Karagandy	Total		112	0			-	-	2	0	-	-	114	0
Astana (loan)	2006	Kazakhstan Premier League	24	0			-		-		-		24	0
Halmstad (loan)	2007	Allsvenskan	7	0			-		-		-		7	0
Spartak Nalchik	2009	Russian Premier League	2	0			-		-		-		2	0
Lokomotiv Astana (loan)	2009	Kazakhstan Premier League	12	0	3	0	-		-		-		15	0
Irtysh Pavlodar	2010	Kazakhstan Premier League	32	0			-		-		-		32	0
Irtysh Pavlodar	2011	Kazakhstan Premier League	9	0			-		0	0	-		9	0
Irtysh Pavlodar	2012	Kazakhstan Premier League	14	0			-		-		-		14	0
Irtysh Pavlodar	Total		55	0			-	-	-	-	-	-	55	0
Çaykur Rizespor	2012–13	TFF First League	33	0	0	0	-		-		-		33	0
Kairat	2013	Kazakhstan Premier League	13	0	0	0	-		-		-		13	0
Kairat	2014	Kazakhstan Premier League	3	0	0	0	-		0	0	-		3	0
Kairat	Total		16	0	0	0	-	-	0	0	-	-	16	0
Karşıyaka	2014–15	TFF First League	8	0	0	0	-		-		-		8	0
Irtysh Pavlodar	2015	Kazakhstan Premier League	29	0	0	0	-		-		-		29	0
Irtysh Pavlodar	2016	Kazakhstan Premier League	24	0	0	0	-		-		-		24	0
Irtysh Pavlodar	2017	Kazakhstan Premier League	30	0	0	0	-		4	0	-		34	0
Irtysh Pavlodar	Total		83	0	0	0	-	-	4	0	-	-	87	0
Ordabasy	2018	Kazakhstan Premier League	7	0	0	0	-		-		-		7	0
Kairat	2018	Kazakhstan Premier League	1	0	0	0	-		-		-		1	0
Okzhetpes	2019	Kazakhstan Premier League	0	0	0	0	-		-		-		0	0
Career total			428	0	3	0	-	-	6	0	-	-	437	0

=== International ===
Kazakhstan national team
Year	Apps	Goals
2000	2	0
2001	1	0
2002	0	0
2003	0	0
2004	0	0
2005	4	0
2006	7	0
2007	13	0
2008	6	0
2009	2	0
2010	0	0
2011	2	0
2012	0	0
2013	0	0
2014	0	0
2015	0	0
2016	3	0
2017	6	0
Total	46	0

Statistics accurate as of match played 10 June 2017

== Honours ==
=== Club ===
Zhenis Astana/Astana

- Kazakhstan Premier League: 2000, 2001, 2006
- Kazakhstan Cup: 2000, 2002

=== Personal ===
- 2000 Kazakhstan FF "Best goalkeeper of the year"
- 2005 Kazakhstan FF "Best goalkeeper of the year"
- 2006 GOAL Journal "Best Player of the year"
