= Marat Shakhmetov =

Kazakhstani footballer

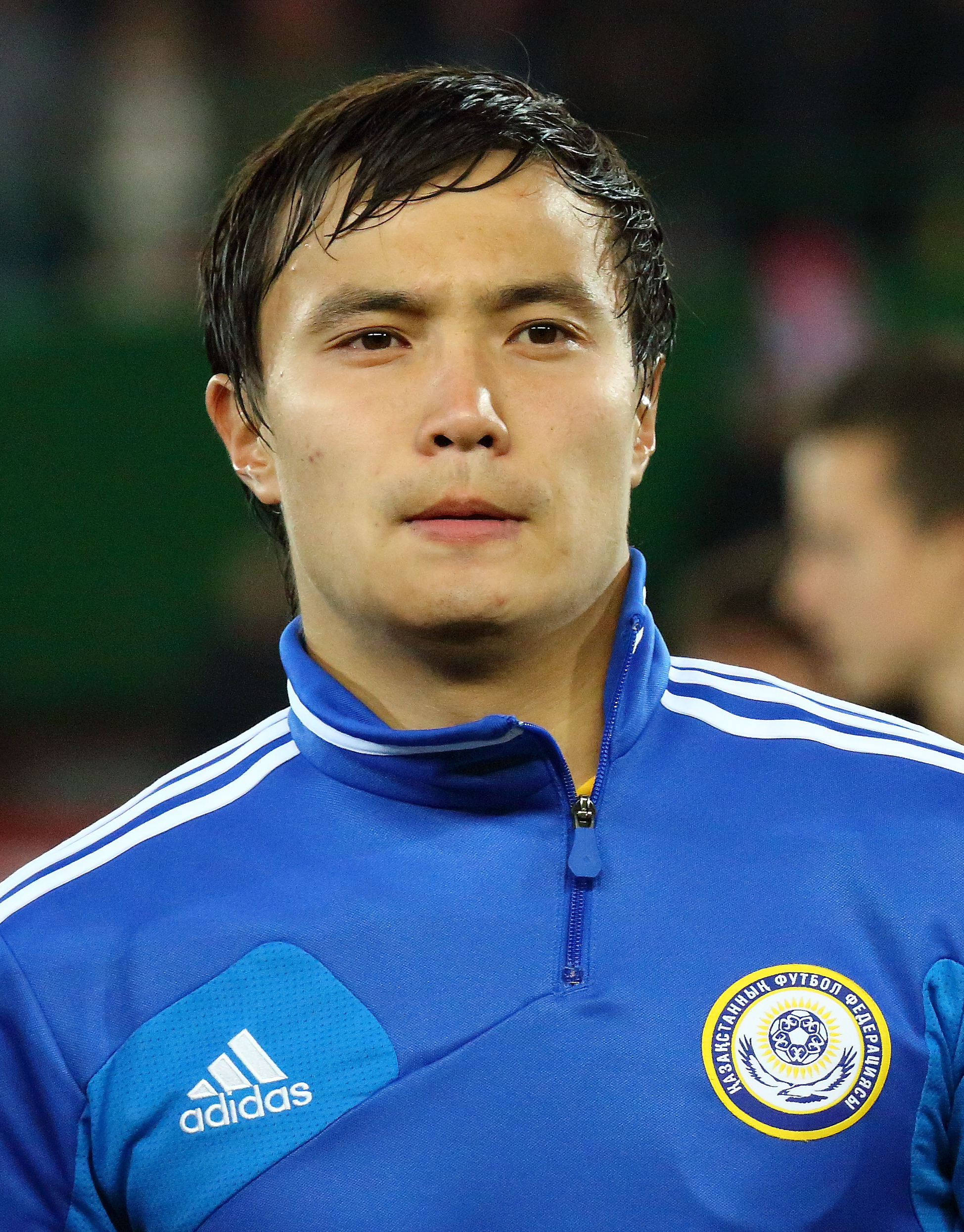

Personal information
- Full name: Marat Serikuly Shakhmetov
- Date of birth: 6 February 1989 (age 37)
- Place of birth: Almaty, Kazakh SSR, Soviet Union
- Height: 1.83 m (6 ft 0 in)
- Position: Midfielder

Team information
- Current team: Caspiy
- Number: 6

Senior career*
Years	Team	Apps	(Gls)
2006–2008	Alma-Ata	55	(3)
2009–2014	Astana	131	(7)
2014	→ Atyrau (loan)	10	(0)
2015	Zhetysu	30	(0)
2016	Taraz	15	(1)
2016	Akzhayik	6	(1)
2017–2020	Shakhter Karagandy	82	(8)
2020	→ Caspiy (loan)	14	(1)
2021–2023	Taraz	48	(1)
2023	Kyzylzhar	12	(1)
2024	Khan Tengri	24	(2)
2025-	Caspiy	6	(1)

International career^{‡}
2005	Kazakhstan U17	3	(0)
2007–2010	Kazakhstan U21	11	(0)
2010–	Kazakhstan	10	(0)
- * Club domestic league appearances and goals as of 2 November 2025 ‡ National team caps and goals as of 6 March 2015

Marat Serikuly Shakhmetov (Kazakh: Марат Серікұлы Шахметов; born 6 February 1989) is a Kazakhstani professional footballer who plays for Caspiy in the Kazakhstan First League.

== Career ==
The defensive midfielder previously played for FC Tsesna.

In July 2014, Shakhmetov moved to FC Atyrau on loan, with Guy Essame going the other way.

=== Shakhter Karagandy ===
On 21 November 2018, Shakhmetov signed a new two-year contract with Shakhter Karagandy, keeping him at the club until the end of the 2020 season.

== Career stats ==
=== Club ===
As of match played 11 November 2018

Club	Season	League			National Cup		Continental		Other		Total	
Club	Season	Division	Apps	Goals	Apps	Goals	Apps	Goals	Apps	Goals	Apps	Goals
Tsesna	2006	Kazakhstan First Division	14	2			–		-		14	2
Alma-Ata	2006	Kazakhstan Premier League	5	0			-		-		5	0
Alma-Ata	2007	Kazakhstan Premier League	26	1			-		-		26	1
Alma-Ata	2008	Kazakhstan Premier League	24	2			-		-		24	2
Alma-Ata	Total		55	3	0	0	0	0	0	0	55	3
Astana	2009	Kazakhstan Premier League	13	1	1	0	-		-		14	1
Astana	2010	Kazakhstan Premier League	29	1	5	0	-		-		34	1
Astana	2011	Kazakhstan Premier League	27	3	1	0	-		1	0	29	3
Astana	2012	Kazakhstan Premier League	23	1	7	0	0	0	-		30	1
Astana	2013	Kazakhstan Premier League	27	1	2	0	1	0	0	0	30	1
Astana	2014	Kazakhstan Premier League	12	0	1	0	1	0	-		14	0
Astana	Total		131	7	17	0	2	0	1	0	151	7
Atyrau (loan)	2014	Kazakhstan Premier League	10	0	0	0	–		-		10	0
Zhetysu	2015	Kazakhstan Premier League	30	0	1	0	–		1	1	32	1
Taraz	2016	Kazakhstan Premier League	15	1	0	0	–		-		15	1
Akzhayik	2016	Kazakhstan Premier League	6	1	0	0	–		-		6	1
Shakhter Karagandy	2017	Kazakhstan Premier League	23	2	4	0	–		-		27	2
Shakhter Karagandy	2018	Kazakhstan Premier League	32	4	3	0	–		-		35	4
Shakhter Karagandy	2019	Kazakhstan Premier League	27	2	0	0	–		-		27	2
Shakhter Karagandy	2020	Kazakhstan Premier League	0	0	0	0	–		-		0	0
Shakhter Karagandy	Total		82	8	7	0	-	-	-	-	89	8
Caspiy (loan)	2020	Kazakhstan Premier League	2	0	0	0	–		-		2	0
Career total			341	22	25	0	2	0	2	1	374	23

=== International ===
Kazakhstan
Year	Apps	Goals
2011	4	0
2012	4	0
2013	2	0
Total	10	0

Statistics accurate as of match played 4 June 2013
