= Kazakhstani football clubs in international competitions =

This page summarises the results and performance of Kazakhstani football clubs in international competitions. Clubs began participating in the competitions of the Asian Football Confederation from the 1994–95 season until the 2000–01 season. No clubs participated in continental competitions during the 2001–02 season, as the Football Federation of Kazakhstan finalised their switch to become the 52nd member of UEFA. Kazakhstani clubs have played in UEFA competitions since the 2002–03 season. Zhenis in the 2007–08 UEFA Champions League, were the first club to advance in a European tournament. Tobol reached the second qualifying round of the UEFA Cup by winning three rounds of the Intertoto Cup in 2007. Shakhter were the first team to reach group stage of any competition in 2013, qualifying to UEFA Europa League after being defeated in UEFA Champions League play-off round. Astana became the first ever Kazakhstani team to reach UEFA Champions League group stage in 2015, passing three rounds of qualification and play-offs. Astana also became the first ever Kazakhstani team to qualify for knockout stage of any European competition in 2017, by finishing runner-up in 2017–18 UEFA Europa League group stage (reached the Round of 32). In 2021 Kairat became the first ever Kazakhstani club to compete in the group stage of inaugural UEFA Europa Conference League. In 2025, Kairat became the second Kazakhstani club to pass the Champions League Play-off round, and will be the first Kazakhstani side to compete in the League phase.

== Asian competitions ==
=== Asian Club Championship ===
- 1994–95: Irtysh
- 1995: Elimai
- 1996–97: Elimai
- 1997–98: Taraz
- 1998–99: Irtysh
- 1999–2000: Irtysh
- 2000–01: Irtysh

=== Asian Cup Winners' Cup ===
- 1994–95: Taraz
- 1995: Vostok
- 1996–97: Ordabasy
- 1997–98: Kairat
- 1998–99: Kaisar
- 1999–2000: Kaisar
- 2000–01: Kairat

== UEFA competitions ==
=== Summary ===
Due to Kazakhstan's spring-autumn league season, Kazakh clubs are able to start their European campaign only for the next season. Current club allocation is as following: 1 club (champion) for the Champions League 1st qualifying round, 3 clubs for the Europa Conference League 2nd qualifying round.

Season	UEFA Season	Coef.	Rank	CH	RU	3rd	4th	5th	9th	CW	CRU
2001	2002–03	0.500	50	JEN	ATY	TOB^{1}				KRT	JEN
2002	2003–04	0.167	51	IRT	ATY	TOB				JEN	IRT
2003^{2}	2004–05	0.000	50	IRT	TOB	JEN				KRT	TOB
2004^{3}	2005–06	1.000	50	KRT	IRT	TOB				TAR	KRT
2005	2006–07	0.667	50	AKT	TOB	KRT	SHA			JEN^{4}	KRT
2006	2007–08	0.750	49	JEN	AKT	TOB				ALM	JEN
2007	2008–09	0.833	45	AKT	TOB	SHA	IRT^{4}	ZTS		TOB	ORD
2008^{5}	2009–10	1.125	45	AKT	TOB	IRT	KSR	MEG	OKZ^{6}	AKT	ALM
2009	2010–11	0.875	44	AKT	AST^{4}	SHA	TOB			ATY	SHA
2010	2011–12	1.625	42	TOB	AKT	IRT				AST^{4}	SHA
2011	2012–13	1.375	41	SHA	ZTS	AKT				ORD	TOB
2012	2013–14	3.125	40	SHA	IRT	AKT				AST	IRT
2013	2014–15	3.375	38	AKT	AST	KRT				SHA	TAR
2014	2015–16	4.625	34	AST	AKT	KRT	ORD			KRT	AKT
2015	2016–17	2.750	32	AST	KRT	AKT	ORD			KRT	AST
2016	2017–18	4.250	28	AST	KRT	IRT	ORD			AST	KRT
2017	2018–19	4.250	29	AST	KRT	ORD^{4}	IRT	TOB		KRT	ATY
2018	2019–20	3.375	28	AST	KRT	TOB	ORD			KRT	ATY
2019	2020–21	1.000	24	AST	KRT	ORD				KSR	ATY
2020	2021–22	2.875	24	KRT	TOB	AST	SHA			N/A^{7}	N/A
2021	2022–23	1.125	27	TOB	AST	KRT	KYZ			KRT	SHA
2022	2023–24	3.125	29	AST	AKT	TOB				ORD	AKZ
2023	2024–25	3.000	30	ORD	AST	AKT				TOB	ORD
2024	2025–26	TBD	TBD	KRT	AST	AKT	ORD			AKT	ATY
2025	2026–27	TBD	TBD	KRT	AST	TOB	YEL			TOB	ORD

Key to colours

Champions League	UEFA Cup / Europa League	UEFA Europa Conference League	Intertoto Cup

Notes

- – Historical names shown in brackets according to respective seasons
- (1) Tobol did not apply for Intertoto Cup 2002
- (2) No club went through appropriated licensing procedures to play on a European stage for 2004–05 season
- (3) Only Kairat went through appropriate licensing procedures to play on a European stage for 2005–06 season
- (4) Club failed to comply with licensing
- (5) Intertoto Cup has been discontinued after season 2008.
- (6) Almaty and Megasport officials announced that the two clubs have merged to a new team called Lokomotiv, who inherited Almaty UEFA Europa League 2009–10 spot earned through Kazakhstan Cup 2008. However, Lokomotiv were eventually denied the UEFA License for competing in Europa League due to legal difficulties when creating the new club. Thereby, the potential candidates for one spot left in Europa League were Kaisar, Zhetysu, Shakhter and Okzhetpes. Kaisar and Shakhter were, however, denied a license and Zhetysu eventually withdrew from Europe due to financial difficulties. That left Okzhetpes, 9th positioned club in season, as the third Europa League participant.
- (7) 2020 Kazakhstan Cup was cancelled due to COVID-19 pandemic in Kazakhstan. This situation allowed Shakhter, 4th positioned club in season, to take part in the Europa Conference League as a third participant from Kazakhstan.

=== Progress by season ===
UEFA Season	QR1	QR2	QR3	PO	GS/LP	QR1	QR2	QR3	PO	GS/LP	R32	QR1	QR2	QR3	PO	GS/LP
	UEFA Champions League					UEFA Cup/Europa League						UEFA Conference League				
2002–03	JEN					ATY						Not held				
2002–03						KRT						Not held				
2003–04	IRT					ATY						Not held				
2003–04						JEN						Not held				
2005–06	KRT											Not held				
2006–07	AKT					TOB						Not held				
2006–07						KRT						Not held				
2007–08	JEN					ALM						Not held				
2007–08						AKT						Not held				
2007–08							TOB					Not held				
2008–09	AKT					TOB						Not held				
2008–09						SHA						Not held				
2009–10		AKT							AKT			Not held				
2009–10						IRT						Not held				
2009–10						OKZ						Not held				
2009–10							TOB					Not held				
2010–11		AKT							AKT			Not held				
2010–11						TOB						Not held				
2010–11						SHA						Not held				
2010–11							ATY					Not held				
2011–12		TOB				SHA						Not held				
2011–12						IRT						Not held				
2011–12							AKT					Not held				
2012–13		SHA				ZTS						Not held				
2012–13						ORD						Not held				
2012–13						AKT						Not held				
2013–14		SHA								SHA		Not held				
2013–14						AST						Not held				
2013–14						IRT						Not held				
2013–14						AKT						Not held				
2014–15		AKT							AKT			Not held				
2014–15						KRT						Not held				
2014–15						SHA						Not held				
2014–15						AST						Not held				
2015–16		AST										Not held				
2015–16						ORD						Not held				
2015–16						AKT						Not held				
2015–16						KRT						Not held				
2016–17		AST							AST			Not held				
2016–17						ORD						Not held				
2016–17						AKT						Not held				
2016–17						KRT						Not held				
2017–18		AST								AST		Not held				
2017–18						ORD						Not held				
2017–18						IRT						Not held				
2017–18						KRT						Not held				
2018–19	AST								AST			Not held				
2018–19						IRT						Not held				
2018–19						TOB						Not held				
2018–19						KRT						Not held				
2019–20	AST						AST					Not held				
2019–20						TOB						Not held				
2019–20						ORD						Not held				
2019–20						KRT						Not held				
2020–21	AST						AST					Not held				
2020–21						ORD						Not held				
2020–21							KSR					Not held				
2020–21						KRT						Not held				
2021–22	KRT							KRT							KRT	
2021–22													TOB			
2021–22													AST			
2021–22													SHA			
2022–23	TOB												TOB			
2022–23													AST			
2022–23													KRT			
2022–23													KYZ			
2023–24	AST							AST							AST	
2023–24													ORD			
2023–24													AKT			
2023–24												TOB				
2024–25	ORD												ORD			
2024–25						TOB							TOB			
2024–25													AST			
2024–25												AKT				
2025–26	KRT															
2025–26						AKT							AKT			
2025–26													AST			
2025–26												ORD				
2026–27	KRT								KRT							
2026–27													TOB			
2026–27												AST				
2026–27												YEL				
	Champions League					UEFA Cup/Europa League						UEFA Conference League				
UEFA Season	QR1	QR2	QR3	PO	GS/LP	QR1	QR2	QR3	PO	GS/LP	R32	QR1	QR2	QR3	PO	GS/LP

=== UEFA Champions League ===
As of 11 August 2026

Season	Team	Round	Against	Home	Away	Agg.
2002–03	Jenis	QR1	(Moldova) Sheriff Tiraspol	3–2	1–2	**4–4**(a)
2003–04	Irtysh	QR1	(Cyprus) AC Omonia	1–2	0–0	**1–2**
2005–06	Kairat	QR1	(Slovakia) Artmedia	2–0	1–4(aet)	**3–4**
2006–07	Aktobe	QR1	(Latvia) Liepājas Metalurgs	1–1	0–1	**1–2**
2007–08	Jenis	QR1	(Georgia (country)) Olimpi Rustavi	3–0	0–0	**3–0**
2007–08	Jenis	QR2	(Norway) Rosenborg	1–3	1–7	**2–10**
2008–09	Aktobe	QR1	(Moldova) Sheriff Tiraspol	1–0	0–4	**1–4**
2009–10	Aktobe	QR2	(Iceland) FH	2–0	4–0	**6–0**
2009–10	Aktobe	QR3	(Israel) Maccabi Haifa	0–0	3–4	**3–4**
2010–11	Aktobe	QR2	(Georgia (country)) Olimpi Rustavi	2–0	1–1	**3–1**
2010–11	Aktobe	QR3	(Israel) Hapoel Tel Aviv	1–0	1–3	**2–3**
2011–12	Tobol	QR2	(Slovakia) Slovan Bratislava	1–1	0–2	**1–3**
2012–13	Shakhter	QR2	(Czech Republic) Slovan Liberec	1–1(aet)	0–1	**1–2**
2013–14	Shakhter	QR2	(Belarus) BATE Borisov	1–0	1–0	**2–0**
2013–14	Shakhter	QR3	(Albania) Skënderbeu Korçë	3–0	2–3	**5–3**
2013–14	Shakhter	PO	(Scotland) Celtic	2–0	0–3	**2–3**
2014–15	Aktobe	QR2	(Georgia (country)) Dinamo Tbilisi	3–0	1–0	**4–0**
2014–15	Aktobe	QR3	(Romania) Steaua București	2–2	1–2	**3–4**
2015–16	Astana	QR2	(Slovenia) Maribor	3–1	0–1	**3–2**
2015–16	Astana	QR3	(Finland) HJK	4–3	0–0	**4–3**
2015–16	Astana	PO	(Cyprus) APOEL	1–0	1–1	**2–1**
2015–16	Astana	Group C	(Portugal) Benfica	2–2	0–2	**4th**
2015–16	Astana	Group C	(Spain) Atlético Madrid	0–0	0–4	**4th**
2015–16	Astana	Group C	(Turkey) Galatasaray	2–2	1–1	**4th**
2016–17	Astana	QR2	(Lithuania) Žalgiris Vilnius	2–1	0–0	**2–1**
2016–17	Astana	QR3	(Scotland) Celtic	1–1	1–2	**2–3**
2017–18	Astana	QR2	(Latvia) Spartaks Jurmala	1–1	1–0	**2–1**
2017–18	Astana	QR3	(Poland) Legia Warsaw	3–1	0–1	**3–2**
2017–18	Astana	PO	(Scotland) Celtic	4–3	0–5	**4–8**
2018–19	Astana	QR1	(Montenegro) Sutjeska Nikšić	1–0	2–0	**3–0**
2018–19	Astana	QR2	(Denmark) Midtjylland	2–1	0–0	**2–1**
2018–19	Astana	QR3	(Croatia) Dinamo Zagreb	0–2	0–1	**0–3**
2019–20	Astana	QR1	(Romania) CFR Cluj	1–0	1–3	**2–3**
2020–21	Astana	QR1	(Belarus) Dynamo Brest	—N/a	**3–6**	—N/a
2021–22	Kairat	QR1	(Israel) Maccabi Haifa	2–0	1–1	**3–1**
2021–22	Kairat	QR2	(Serbia) Red Star Belgrade	2–1	0–5	**2–6**
2022–23	Tobol	QR1	(Hungary) Ferencváros	0–0	1–5	**1–5**
2023–24	Astana	QR1	(Georgia (country)) Dinamo Tbilisi	1–1	2–1	**3–2**
2023–24	Astana	QR2	(Croatia) Dinamo Zagreb	0–2	0–4	**0–6**
2024–25	Ordabasy	QR1	(Moldova) Petrocub Hîncești	0–0	0–1	**0–1**
2025–26	Kairat	QR1	(Slovenia) Olimpija Ljubljana	2–0	1–1	**3–1**
2025–26	Kairat	QR2	(Finland) KuPS	3–0	0–2	**3–2**
2025–26	Kairat	QR3	(Slovakia) Slovan Bratislava	1–0	0–1	**1–1**(p)
2025–26	Kairat	PO	(Scotland) Celtic	0–0	0–0	**0–0**(p)
2025–26	Kairat	LP	(Portugal) Sporting CP	—N/a	1–4	**36th**
2025–26	Kairat	LP	(Spain) Real Madrid	0–5	—N/a	**36th**
2025–26	Kairat	LP	(Cyprus) Pafos	0–0	—N/a	**36th**
2025–26	Kairat	LP	(Italy) Inter Milan	—N/a	1–2	**36th**
2025–26	Kairat	LP	(Denmark) Copenhagen	—N/a	2–3	**36th**
2025–26	Kairat	LP	(Greece) Olympiacos	0–1	—N/a	**36th**
2025–26	Kairat	LP	(Belgium) Club Brugge	1–4	—N/a	**36th**
2025–26	Kairat	LP	(England) Arsenal	—N/a	2–3	**36th**
2026–27	Kairat	QR1	(Montenegro) Sutjeska	2–1	2–0	**4–1**
2026–27	Kairat	QR2	(Cyprus) Omonia	1–0(aet)	0–1	**1–1**(p)
2026–27	Kairat	QR3	(Bulgaria) Levski Sofia	0–1	0–1	**0–2**

=== UEFA Cup / Europa League ===
As of 20 August 2026

Season	Team	Round	Against	Home	Away	Agg.
2002–03	Atyrau	QR	(Slovakia) Matador Púchov	0–0	0–2	**0–2**
2002–03	Kairat	QR	(Serbia and Montenegro) Red Star Belgrade	0–2	0–3	**0–5**
2003–04	Jenis	QR	(Czech Republic) Viktoria Žižkov	1–3	0–3	**1–6**
2003–04	Atyrau	QR	(Bulgaria) Levski Sofia	1–4	0–2	**1–6**
2006–07	Kairat	QR1	(Hungary) Videoton	2–1	0–1	**2–2**(a)
2006–07	Tobol	QR1	(Switzerland) Basel	0–0	1–3	**1–3**
2007–08	Alma-Ata	QR1	(Slovakia) ViOn Zlaté Moravce	1–1	1–3	**2–4**
2007–08	Aktobe	QR1	(Austria) Mattersburg	1–0	2–4	**3–4**
2007–08	Tobol	QR2	(Poland) Dyskobolia Grodzisk	0–1	0–2	**0–3**
2008–09	Tobol	QR1	Austria Wien	1–0	0–2	**1–2**
2008–09	Shakhter	QR1	(Hungary) Debrecen	1–1	0–1	**1–2**
2009–10	Irtysh	QR1	(Hungary) Haladás	2–1	0–1	**2–2**(a)
2009–10	Okzhetpes	QR1	(Moldova) Zimbru Chişinău	0–2	2–1	**2–3**
2009–10	Tobol	QR2	(Turkey) Galatasaray	1–1	0–2	**1–3**
2009–10	Aktobe	PO	(Germany) Werder Bremen	0–2	3–6	**3–8**
2010–11	Tobol	QR1	(Bosnia and Herzegovina) Zrinjski Mostar	1–2	1–2	**2–4**
2010–11	Shakhter	QR1	(Poland) Ruch Chorzów	1–2	0–1	**1–3**
2010–11	Atyrau	QR2	(Hungary) Győri ETO	0–3	0–2	**0–5**
2010–11	Aktobe	PO	(Netherlands) AZ	2–1	0–2	**2–3**
2011–12	Shakhter	QR1	(Slovenia) Koper	2–1	1–1	**3–2**
2011–12	Shakhter	QR2	(Republic of Ireland) St Patrick's Athletic	2–1	0–2	**2–3**
2011–12	Irtysh	QR1	(Poland) Jagiellonia Białystok	2–0	0–1	**2–1**
2011–12	Irtysh	QR2	(Georgia (country)) Metalurgi Rustavi	0–2	1–1	**1–3**
2011–12	Aktobe	QR2	(Hungary) Kecskeméti	0–0	1–1	**1–1**(a)
2011–12	Aktobe	QR3	(Russia) Alania Vladikavkaz	1–1	1–1	**2–2**(p)
2012–13	Zhetysu	QR1	(Poland) Lech Poznan	1–1	0–2	**1–3**
2012–13	Ordabasy	QR1	(Serbia) Jagodina	0–0	1–0	**1–0**
2012–13	Ordabasy	QR2	(Norway) Rosenborg	1–2	2–2	**3–4**
2012–13	Aktobe	QR1	(Georgia (country)) Torpedo Kutaisi	1–0	1–1	**2–1**
2012–13	Aktobe	QR2	(Moldova) Milsami Orhei	3–0	2–4	**5–4**
2012–13	Aktobe	QR3	(Belgium) Genk	1–2	1–2	**2–4**
2013–14	Astana	QR1	(Bulgaria) Botev Plovdiv	0–1	0–5	**0–6**
2013–14	Irtysh	QR1	(Bulgaria) Levski Sofia	2–0	0–0	**2–0**
2013–14	Irtysh	QR2	(Bosnia and Herzegovina) Široki Brijeg	3–2	0–2	**3–4**
2013–14	Aktobe	QR1	(Armenia) Gandzasar	2–1	2–1	**4–2**
2013–14	Aktobe	QR2	(Norway) Hødd	2–0	0–1	**2–1**
2013–14	Aktobe	QR3	(Iceland) Breiðablik	1–0	0–1	**1–1**(p)
2013–14	Aktobe	PO	(Ukraine) Dynamo Kyiv	2–3	1–5	**3–8**
2013–14	Shakhter	GS	(Netherlands) AZ	1–1	0–1	**4th**
2013–14	Shakhter	GS	(Greece) PAOK	0–2	1–2	**4th**
2013–14	Shakhter	GS	(Israel) Maccabi Haifa	2–2	1–2	**4th**
2014–15	Kairat	QR1	(Albania) Kukësi	1–0	0–0	**1–0**
2014–15	Kairat	QR2	(Denmark) Esbjerg	1–1	0–1	**1–2**
2014–15	Shakhter	QR1	(Armenia) Shirak	4–0	2–1	**6–1**
2014–15	Shakhter	QR2	(Lithuania) Atlantas	3–0	0–0	**3–0**
2014–15	Shakhter	QR3	(Croatia) Hajduk Split	4–2	0–3	**4–5**
2014–15	Astana	QR1	(Armenia) Pyunik	2–0	4–1	**6–1**
2014–15	Astana	QR2	(Israel) Hapoel Tel Aviv	3–0	0–1	**3–1**
2014–15	Astana	QR3	(Sweden) AIK	1–1	3–0	**4–1**
2014–15	Astana	PO	(Spain) Villarreal	0–3	0–4	**0–7**
2014–15	Aktobe	PO	(Poland) Legia Warsaw	0–1	0–2	**0–3**
2015–16	Kairat	QR1	(Serbia) Red Star Belgrade	2–1	2–0	**4–1**
2015–16	Kairat	QR2	(Armenia) Alashkert	3–0	1–2	**4–2**
2015–16	Kairat	QR3	(Scotland) Aberdeen	2–1	1–1	**3–2**
2015–16	Kairat	PO	(France) Bordeaux	2–1	0–1	**2–2**(a)
2015–16	Aktobe	QR1	(Estonia) Nõmme Kalju	0–1	0–0	**0–1**
2015–16	Ordabasy	QR1	(Israel) Beitar Jerusalem	0–0	1–2	**1–2**
2016–17	Kairat	QR1	(Albania) Teuta Durrës	5–0	1–0	**6–0**
2016–17	Kairat	QR2	(Israel) Maccabi Tel Aviv	1–1	1–2	**2–3**
2016–17	Aktobe	QR1	(Hungary) MTK Budapest	1–1	0–2	**1–3**
2016–17	Ordabasy	QR1	(Serbia) Čukarički	3–3	0–3	**3–6**
2016–17	Astana	PO	(Belarus) BATE Borisov	2–0	2–2	**4–2**
2016–17	Astana	GS	(Greece) Olympiacos	1–1	1–4	**4th**
2016–17	Astana	GS	(Cyprus) APOEL	2–1	1–2	**4th**
2016–17	Astana	GS	(Switzerland) Young Boys	0–0	0–3	**4th**
2017–18	Kairat	QR1	(Lithuania) Atlantas	6–0	2–1	**8–1**
2017–18	Kairat	QR2	(Albania) Skënderbeu Korçë	1–1	0–2	**1–3**
2017–18	Irtysh	QR1	(Bulgaria) Dunav Ruse	1–0	2–0	**3–0**
2017–18	Irtysh	QR2	(Serbia) Red Star Belgrade	1–1	0–2	**1–3**
2017–18	Ordabasy	QR1	(Bosnia and Herzegovina) Široki Brijeg	0–0	0–2	**0–2**
2017–18	Astana	GS	(Spain) Villarreal	2–3	1–3	**2nd**
2017–18	Astana	GS	(Israel) Maccabi Tel Aviv	4–0	1–0	**2nd**
2017–18	Astana	GS	(Czech Republic) Slavia Prague	1–1	1–0	**2nd**
2017–18	Astana	R32	(Portugal) Sporting CP	1–3	3–3	**4–6**
2018–19	Kairat	QR1	(Andorra) Engordany	7–1	3–0	**10–1**
2018–19	Kairat	QR2	(Netherlands) AZ	2–0	1–2	**3–2**
2018–19	Kairat	QR3	(Czech Republic) Sigma Olomouc	1–2	0–2	**1–4**
2018–19	Tobol	QR1	(Georgia (country)) Samtredia	2–0	1–0	**3–0**
2018–19	Tobol	QR2	(Armenia) Pyunik	2–1	0–1	**2–2**(a)
2018–19	Irtysh	QR1	(Lithuania) Trakai	0–1	0–0	**0–1**
2018–19	Astana	PO	(Cyprus) APOEL	1–0	0–1	**1–1** (p)
2018–19	Astana	GS	(Ukraine) Dynamo Kyiv	0–1	2–2	**3rd**
2018–19	Astana	GS	(France) Rennes	2–0	0–2	**3rd**
2018–19	Astana	GS	(Czech Republic) Jablonec	2–1	1–1	**3rd**
2019–20	Kairat	QR1	(Bosnia and Herzegovina) Široki Brijeg	2–1	2–1	**4–2**
2019–20	Kairat	QR2	(Israel) Hapoel Be'er Sheva	1–1	0–2	**1–3**
2019–20	Tobol	QR1	(Luxembourg) Jeunesse Esch	1–1	0–0	**1–1** (a)
2019–20	Ordabasy	QR1	(Georgia (country)) Torpedo Kutaisi	1–0	2–0	**3–0**
2019–20	Ordabasy	QR2	(Czech Republic) Mladá Boleslav	2–3	1–1	**3–4**
2019–20	Astana	QR2	(Andorra) Santa Coloma	4–1	0–0	**4–1**
2019–20	Astana	QR3	(Malta) Valletta	5–1	4–0	**9–1**
2019–20	Astana	PO	(Belarus) BATE Borisov	3–0	0–2	**3–2**
2019–20	Astana	GS	(England) Manchester United	2–1	0–1	**4th**
2019–20	Astana	GS	(Serbia) Partizan	1–2	1–4	**4th**
2019–20	Astana	GS	(Netherlands) AZ Alkmaar	0–5	0–6	**4th**
2020–21	Ordabasy	QR1	(Romania) Botoșani	**1–2**	—N/a	—N/a
2020–21	Kairat	QR1	(Armenia) Noah	**4–1**	—N/a	—N/a
2020–21	Kairat	QR2	(Israel) Maccabi Haifa	—N/a	**1–2**	—N/a
2020–21	Astana	QR2	(Montenegro) Budućnost Podgorica	**0–1**	—N/a	—N/a
2020–21	Kaisar	QR2	(Cyprus) APOEL	**1–4**	—N/a	—N/a
2021–22	Kairat	QR3	(Armenia) Alashkert	0–0	2–3	**2–3**
2023–24	Astana	QR3	(Bulgaria) Ludogorets Razgrad	2–1	1–5	**3–6**
2024–25	Tobol	QR1	(Slovakia) Ružomberok	1–0	2–5	**3–5**
2025–26	Aktobe	QR1	(Poland) Legia Warsaw	0–1	0–1	**0–2**
2025–26	Kairat	PO	(Belgium) Anderlecht	0–3		

=== UEFA Conference League ===
As of 13 August 2026

Season	Team	Round	Against	Home	Away	Agg.
2021–22	Tobol	QR2	(Croatia) Hajduk Split	4–1	0–2	**4–3**
2021–22	Tobol	QR3	(Slovakia) Žilina	0–1	0–5	**0–6**
2021–22	Astana	QR2	(Greece) Aris Thessaloniki	2–0	1–2	**3–2**
2021–22	Astana	QR3	(Finland) KuPS	3–4	1–1	**4–5**
2021–22	Shakhter	QR2	(Romania) FCSB	2–1	0–1	**2–2** (p)
2021–22	Shakhter	QR3	(Ukraine) Kolos Kovalivka	0–0	0–0	**0–0** (p)
2021–22	Shakhter	PO	(Israel) Maccabi Tel Aviv	1–2	1–2	**2–4**
2021–22	Kairat	PO	(Luxembourg) Fola Esch	3–1	4–1	**7–2**
2021–22	Kairat	GS	(Switzerland) Basel	2–3	2–4	**4th**
2021–22	Kairat	GS	(Azerbaijan) Qarabağ	1–2	1–2	**4th**
2021–22	Kairat	GS	(Cyprus) Omonia	0–0	0–0	**4th**
2022–23	Tobol	QR2	(Gibraltar) Lincoln Red Imps	2–0	1–0	**3–0**
2022–23	Tobol	QR3	(Bosnia and Herzegovina) Zrinjski	1–1	0–1	**1–2**
2022–23	Kairat	QR2	(Hungary) Kisvárda	0–1	0–1	**0–2**
2022–23	Astana	QR2	(Poland) Raków Częstochowa	0–1	0–5	**0–6**
2022–23	Kyzylzhar	QR2	(Croatia) Osijek	1–2	2–0	**3–2**
2022–23	Kyzylzhar	QR3	(Cyprus) APOEL	0–0	0–1	**0–1**
2023–24	Ordabasy	QR2	(Poland) Legia Warsaw	2–2	2–3	**4–5**
2023–24	Aktobe	QR2	(Georgia (country)) Torpedo Kutaisi	1–2	4–1	**5–3**
2023–24	Aktobe	QR3	(Romania) Sepsi OSK	0–1	1–1	**1–2**
2023–24	Tobol	QR1	(Finland) Honka	2–1	0–0	**2–1**
2023–24	Tobol	QR2	(Switzerland) Basel	1–2	3–1	**4–3**
2023–24	Tobol	QR3	(Republic of Ireland) Derry City	1–0	0–1	**1–1** (p)
2023–24	Tobol	PO	(Czech Republic) Viktoria Plzeň	1–2	0–3	**1–5**
2023–24	Astana	PO	(Albania) Partizani	1–0	1–1	**2–1**
2023–24	Astana	GS	(Croatia) Dinamo Zagreb	0–2	1–5	**3rd**
2023–24	Astana	GS	(Czech Republic) Viktoria Plzeň	1–2	0–3	**3rd**
2023–24	Astana	GS	(Kosovo) Ballkani	0–0	2–1	**3rd**
2024–25	Aktobe	QR1	(Bosnia and Herzegovina) Sarajevo	0–1	3–2	**3–3** (p)
2024–25	Tobol	QR2	(Switzerland) St. Gallen	1–4	0–1	**1–5**
2024–25	Ordabasy	QR2	(Luxembourg) Differdange 03	4–3	0–1	**4–4** (p)
2024–25	Ordabasy	QR3	(Armenia) Pyunik	0–1	0–1	**0–2**
2024–25	Astana	QR2	(Moldova) Milsami Orhei	1–0	1–1	**2–1**
2024–25	Astana	QR3	(Romania) Corvinul Hunedoara	6–1	2–1	**8–2**
2024–25	Astana	PO	(Norway) Brann	3–0	0–2	**3–2**
2024–25	Astana	LP	(Serbia) TSC	1–0	—N/a	**28th**
2024–25	Astana	LP	(Wales) The New Saints	—N/a	0–2	**28th**
2024–25	Astana	LP	(Cyprus) Pafos	—N/a	0–1	**28th**
2024–25	Astana	LP	(Portugal) Vitória de Guimarães	1–1	—N/a	**28th**
2024–25	Astana	LP	(England) Chelsea	1–3	—N/a	**28th**
2024–25	Astana	LP	(Cyprus) APOEL	—N/a	1–1	**28th**
2025–26	Ordabasy	QR1	(Georgia (country)) Torpedo Kutaisi	1–1	3–4	**4–5**
2025–26	Aktobe	QR2	(Czech Republic) Sparta Prague	2–1	0–4	**2–5**
2025–26	Astana	QR2	(Moldova) Zimbru Chișinău	1–1	2–0	**3–1**
2025–26	Astana	QR3	(Switzerland) Lausanne-Sport	0–2	1–3	**1–5**
2026–27	Astana	QR1	(Albania) Dinamo City	1–4	1–0	**2–4**
2026–27	Yelimay	QR1	(Armenia) Alashkert	2–2	1–1	**3–3** (p)
2026–27	Tobol	QR2	(Lithuania) Panevėžys	1–1	1–1	**2–2** (p)
2026–27	Tobol	QR3	(Serbia) Partizan	1–2	0–3	**1–5**
2026–27	Kairat	LP	(Latvia) Riga	—N/a		TBD
2026–27	Kairat	LP	(Greece) Panathinaikos		—N/a	TBD
2026–27	Kairat	LP	(Italy) Atalanta	—N/a		TBD
2026–27	Kairat	LP	(Sweden) Mjällby		—N/a	TBD
2026–27	Kairat	LP	(Romania) Universitatea Craiova		—N/a	TBD
2026–27	Kairat	LP	(Netherlands) Twente	—N/a		TBD

=== UEFA Intertoto Cup ===
Season	Team	Round	Against	Home	Away	Agg.
2003	Tobol	R1	(Poland) Polonia Warsaw	2–1	3–0	5–1
2003	Tobol	R2	(Belgium) Sint-Truidense	1–0	2–0	3–0
2003	Tobol	R3	(Austria) Superfund	0–1	0–3	0–4
2006	Shakhter	R1	(Belarus) MTZ-RIPO Minsk	1–5	3–1	4–6
2007	Tobol^{1}	R1	(Georgia (country)) Zestaponi	3–0	0–2	3–2
2007	Tobol^{1}	R2	(Czech Republic) Slovan Liberec	1–1	2–0	3–1
2007	Tobol^{1}	R3	(Greece) OFI	1–0	1–0	2–0
2008	Zhetysu	R1	(Hungary) Budapest Honvéd	1–2	2–4	3–6

Notes

- (1) Tobol advanced to 2nd Qualifying round of UEFA Cup

=== All-time goalscorers ===
As of 12 August 2026

Players scored at least five goals representing Kazakhstan clubs. Players in bold are still active in sports.

#	Player	Seasons	Clubs	CL	EL	ECL	IC	Total
1	(Croatia) **Marin Tomasov**	2017–	AST	1	11	8		20
2	(Ghana) **Patrick Twumasi**	2014–18	AST	9	6			15
3	(Ivory Coast) Gerard Gohou	2015–17	KRT		11			11
4	(Kazakhstan) Samat Smakov	2006–13	KRT, AKT	5	3			8
-	(Brazil) Vágner Love	2020–21	KRT	1	3	4		8
6	(Kazakhstan) **Roman Murtazayev**	2013–19	SHA, AST	3	4			7
-	(Kazakhstan) **Bauyrzhan Islamkhan**	2014–19	KRT		6	1		7
-	(Kazakhstan) Nurbol Zhumaskaliev	2003–11	TOB		4		3	7
9	(Kazakhstan) Murat Tleshev	2009–11	AKT	4	2			6
-	(Bosnia and Herzegovina) Marin Aničić	2014–19	AST	3	3			6
-	(Kazakhstan) Marat Khairullin	2007–14	AKT	2	4			6
-	(Kazakhstan) **Dmitri Shomko**	2013–20	IRT, AST	1	5			6
-	(Democratic Republic of the Congo) Junior Kabananga	2015–18	AST	1	5			6
-	(Hungary) **Márton Eppel**	2018–19	KRT		6			6
-	(Ukraine) Aderinsola Eseola	2018–20	KRT		6			6
-	(Nigeria) **Geoffrey Chinedu**	2024–25	AST			6		6

=== All-time record ===
As of 5 November 2025

Overall table

Club	Seasons	G	W	D	L	GF	GA	GD	P	PPS	RA
Astana	13	114	39	27	48	141	181	-40	73	5.615	24
Kairat	13	66	25	14	27	85	80	+5	40.5	3.115	16
Shakhter^{1}	8	34	11	8	15	42	44	−2	16	2.000	7
Aktobe	14	56	18	12	26	67	80	−13	24	1.714	10
Kyzylzhar	1	4	1	1	2	3	3	0	1.5	1.500	1
Irtysh	6	18	6	5	7	15	16	−1	8.5	1.417	3
Tobol^{1}	13	51	19	8	24	49	65	-16	15	1.154	11
Okzhetpes	1	2	1	0	1	2	3	−1	1	1.000	0
Ordabasy	9	25	4	9	12	26	35	−9	9	1.000	3
Jenis	3	8	2	1	5	10	20	−10	2.5	0.833	1
Alma-Ata	1	2	0	1	1	2	4	−2	0.5	0.500	0
Kaisar	1	1	0	0	1	1	4	−3	0.5	0.500	0
Zhetysu^{1}	1	4	0	1	3	4	9	−5	0.5	0.500	0
Atyrau	3	6	0	1	5	1	13	−12	0.5	0.167	0

Notes

- (1) Including matches in UEFA Intertoto Cup, where points for wins and draws were not counted for UEFA coefficients table.

UEFA Points by season

Seasons	AST	KRT	AKT	SHA	TOB	IRT	ORD	JEN	KYZ	OKZ	KSR	ATY	ZTS	ALM	Total	Clubs	Coeff
02-03	-	0	-	-	-	-	-	1	-	-	-	0.5	-	-	1.5	3	0.500
03-04	-	-	-	-	-	0.5	-	0	-	-	-	0	-	-	0.5	3	0.166
04-05	-	-	-	-	-	-	-	-	-	-	-	-	-	-	-	-	-
05-06	-	1	-	-	-	-	-	-	-	-	-	-	-	-	1	1	1.000
06-07	-	1	0.5	-	0.5	-	-	-	-	-	-	-	-	-	2	3	0.666
07-08	-	-	1	-	0	-	-	1.5	-	-	-	-	-	0.5	3	4	0.750
08-09	-	-	1	0.5	1	-	-	-	-	-	-	-	-	-	2.5	3	0.833
09-10	-	-	2.5	-	0.5	1	-	-	-	1	-	-	-	-	5	4	1.250
10-11	-	-	3.5	0	0	-	-	-	-	-	-	0	-	-	3.5	4	0.875
11-12	-	-	2	2.5	0.5	1.5	-	-	-	-	-	-	-	-	6.5	4	1.625
12-13	-	-	2.5	0.5	-	-	2	-	-	-	-	-	0.5	-	5.5	4	1.375
13-14	0	-	4	6	-	2.5	-	-	-	-	-	-	-	-	12.5	4	3.125
14-15	4.5	2	2.5	4.5	-	-	-	-	-	-	-	-	-	-	13.5	4	3.375
15-16	12	5.5	0.5	-	-	-	0.5	-	-	-	-	-	-	-	18.5	4	4.625
16-17	7.5	2.5	0.5	-	-	-	0.5	-	-	-	-	-	-	-	11	4	2.750
17-18	11.5	2.5	-	-	-	2.5	0.5	-	-	-	-	-	-	-	17	4	4.250
18-19	10.5	3	-	-	3	0.5	-	-	-	-	-	-	-	-	17	4	4.250
19-20	7.5	2.5	-	-	1	-	2.5	-	-	-	-	-	-	-	13.5	4	3.375
20-21	1	2	-	-	-	-	0.5	-	-	-	0.5	-	-	-	4	4	1.000
21-22	1.5	7	-	2	1	-	-	-	-	-	-	-	-	-	11.5	4	2.875
22-23	0	0	-	-	3	-	-	-	1.5	-	-	-	-	-	4.5	4	1.125
23-24	7	-	1.5	-	3.5	-	0.5	-	-	-	-	-	-	-	12.5	4	3.125
24-25	8.5	-	1	-	1	-	1.5	-	-	-	-	-	-	-	12	4	3.000
25-26	1.5	11.5	1	-	-	-	0.5	-	-	-	-	-	-	-	13.5	4	3.625
Total	**73**	**40.5**	**24**	**16**	**15**	**8.5**	**9**	**2.5**	**1.5**	**1**	**0.5**	**0.5**	**0.5**	**0.5**	**193**		

=== All-time record vs. specific country ===
As of 5 November 2025

Country	Against	Club	P	W	D	L	GF	GA	GD
Albania	Kukësi	KRT	2	1	1	0	1	0	+1
Albania	Teuta Durrës	KRT	2	2	0	0	6	0	+6
Albania	Skënderbeu Korçë	SHA, KRT	4	1	1	2	6	6	0
Albania	Partizani	AST	2	1	1	0	2	1	+1
			**10**	**5**	**3**	**2**	**15**	**7**	**+8**
Andorra	Engordany	KRT	2	2	0	0	10	1	+9
Andorra	Santa Coloma	AST	2	1	1	0	4	1	+3
			**4**	**3**	**1**	**0**	**14**	**2**	**+12**
Armenia	Alashkert	KRT	4	1	1	2	6	5	+1
Armenia	Noah	KRT	1	1	0	0	4	1	+3
Armenia	Gandzasar	AKT	2	2	0	0	4	2	+2
Armenia	Pyunik	AST, TOB, ORD	6	3	0	3	8	5	+3
Armenia	Shirak	SHA	2	2	0	0	6	1	+5
			**15**	**9**	**1**	**5**	**28**	**14**	**+14**
Austria	Austria Wien	TOB	2	1	0	1	1	2	−1
Austria	Superfund	TOB	2	0	0	2	0	4	−4
Austria	Mattersburg	AKT	2	1	0	1	3	4	−1
			**6**	**2**	**0**	**4**	**4**	**10**	**-6**
Azerbaijan	Qarabağ	KRT	2	0	0	2	2	4	-2
			**2**	**0**	**0**	**2**	**2**	**4**	**-2**
Belarus	BATE Borisov	SHA, AST	6	4	1	1	9	4	+5
Belarus	Dynamo Brest	AST	1	0	0	1	3	6	−3
Belarus	MTZ-RIPO Minsk	SHA	2	1	0	1	4	6	−2
			**9**	**5**	**1**	**3**	**16**	**16**	**0**
Belgium	Club Brugge	KRT	0	0	0	0	0	0	0
Belgium	Genk	AKT	2	0	0	2	2	4	−2
Belgium	Sint-Truidense	TOB	2	2	0	0	3	0	+3
			**4**	**2**	**0**	**2**	**5**	**4**	**+1**
Bosnia and Herzegovina	Široki Brijeg	IRT, ORD, KRT	6	3	1	2	7	8	−1
Bosnia and Herzegovina	Sarajevo	AKT	2	1	0	1	3	3	0
Bosnia and Herzegovina	Zrinjski Mostar	TOB	4	0	1	3	3	6	−3
			**12**	**4**	**2**	**6**	**13**	**17**	**-4**
Bulgaria	Botev Plovdiv	AST	2	0	0	2	0	6	−6
Bulgaria	Ludogorets Razgrad	AST	2	1	0	1	3	6	−3
Bulgaria	Dunav Ruse	IRT	2	2	0	0	3	0	+3
Bulgaria	Levski Sofia	ATY, IRT	4	1	1	2	3	6	−3
			**10**	**4**	**1**	**5**	**9**	**18**	**-9**
Croatia	Dinamo Zagreb	AST	6	0	0	6	1	16	−15
Croatia	Hajduk Split	SHA, TOB	4	2	0	2	8	8	0
Croatia	NK Osijek	KYZ	2	1	0	1	3	2	+1
			**12**	**3**	**0**	**9**	**12**	**26**	**−14**
Cyprus	APOEL	AST, KSR, KYZ	10	3	3	4	8	11	−3
Cyprus	Omonia	IRT, KRT	4	0	3	1	1	2	−1
Cyprus	Pafos	AST, KRT	2	0	1	1	0	1	−1
			**16**	**3**	**7**	**6**	**9**	**14**	**-5**
Czech Republic	Jablonec	AST	2	1	1	0	3	2	+1
Czech Republic	Slavia Prague	AST	2	1	1	0	2	1	+1
Czech Republic	Mladá Boleslav	ORD	2	0	1	1	3	4	−1
Czech Republic	Sigma Olomouc	KRT	2	0	0	2	1	4	−3
Czech Republic	Slovan Liberec	TOB, SHA	4	1	2	1	4	3	+1
Czech Republic	Sparta Prague	AKT	2	1	0	1	2	5	−3
Czech Republic	Viktoria Plzeň	TOB, AST	4	0	0	4	2	10	−8
Czech Republic	Viktoria Žižkov	JEN	2	0	0	2	1	6	−5
			**20**	**4**	**5**	**11**	**18**	**35**	**-17**
Denmark	Copenhagen	KRT	0	0	0	0	0	0	0
Denmark	Esbjerg	KRT	2	0	1	1	1	2	−1
Denmark	Midtjylland	AST	2	1	1	0	2	1	+1
			**4**	**1**	**2**	**1**	**3**	**3**	**0**
England	Arsenal	KRT	0	0	0	0	0	0	0
England	Chelsea	AST	1	0	0	1	1	3	−2
England	Manchester United	AST	2	1	0	1	2	2	0
			**3**	**1**	**0**	**2**	**3**	**5**	**-2**
Estonia	Nõmme Kalju	AKT	2	0	1	1	0	1	−1
			**2**	**0**	**1**	**1**	**0**	**1**	**-1**
Finland	HJK Helsinki	AST	2	1	1	0	4	3	+1
Finland	KuPS	AST	4	1	1	2	7	7	0
Finland	Honka	TOB	2	1	1	0	2	1	+1
			**8**	**3**	**3**	**2**	**13**	**11**	**+2**
France	Bordeaux	KRT	2	1	0	1	2	2	0
France	Rennes	AST	2	1	0	1	2	2	0
			**4**	**2**	**0**	**2**	**4**	**4**	**0**
Georgia	Dinamo Tbilisi	AKT, AST	4	3	1	0	7	2	+5
Georgia	Metalurgi Rustavi	JEN, AKT, IRT	6	2	3	1	7	4	+3
Georgia	Samtredia	TOB	2	2	0	0	3	0	+3
Georgia	Zestaponi	TOB	2	1	0	1	3	2	+1
Georgia	Torpedo Kutaisi	AKT, ORD	8	4	2	2	14	9	+5
			**22**	**12**	**6**	**4**	**34**	**17**	**+17**
Germany	Werder Bremen	AKT	2	0	0	2	3	8	−5
			**2**	**0**	**0**	**2**	**3**	**8**	**-5**
Gibraltar	Lincoln Red Imps	TOB	2	2	0	0	3	0	+3
			**2**	**2**	**0**	**0**	**3**	**0**	**+3**
Greece	Aris Thessaloniki	AST	2	1	0	1	3	2	+1
Greece	Olympiacos	AST, KRT	2	0	1	1	2	5	−3
Greece	OFI	TOB	2	2	0	0	2	0	+2
Greece	PAOK	SHA	2	0	0	2	1	4	−3
			**8**	**3**	**1**	**4**	**8**	**11**	**-3**
Hungary	Budapest Honvéd	ZTS	2	0	0	2	3	6	−3
Hungary	Debrecen	SHA	2	0	1	1	1	2	−1
Hungary	Ferencváros	TOB	2	0	1	1	1	5	-4
Hungary	Győri ETO	ATY	2	0	0	2	0	5	−5
Hungary	Haladás	IRT	2	1	0	1	2	2	0
Hungary	Kecskeméti	AKT	2	0	2	0	1	1	0
Hungary	MTK Budapest	AKT	2	0	1	1	1	3	−2
Hungary	Kisvárda	KRT	2	0	0	2	0	2	−2
Hungary	Videoton	KRT	2	1	0	1	2	2	0
			**18**	**2**	**5**	**11**	**11**	**28**	**−17**
Iceland	Breiðablik	AKT	2	1	0	1	1	1	0
Iceland	FH	AKT	2	2	0	0	6	0	+6
			**4**	**3**	**0**	**1**	**7**	**1**	**+6**
Republic of Ireland	Derry City	TOB	2	1	0	1	1	1	0
Republic of Ireland	St Patrick's Athl.	SHA	2	1	0	1	2	3	−1
			**4**	**2**	**0**	**2**	**3**	**4**	**−1**
Israel	Beitar Jerusalem	ORD	2	0	1	1	1	2	−1
Israel	Hapoel Be'er Sheva	KRT	2	0	1	1	1	3	-2
Israel	Hapoel Tel Aviv	AKT, AST	4	2	0	2	5	4	+1
Israel	Maccabi Haifa	AKT, SHA, KRT	7	1	3	3	10	11	−1
Israel	Maccabi Tel Aviv	KRT, AST, SHA	6	2	1	3	9	7	+2
			**21**	**5**	**6**	**10**	**26**	**27**	**-1**
Italy	Inter Milan	KRT	1	0	0	1	1	2	-1
			**1**	**0**	**0**	**1**	**1**	**2**	**-1**
Kosovo	Ballkani	AST	2	1	1	0	2	1	+1
			**2**	**1**	**1**	**0**	**2**	**1**	**+1**
Latvia	Liepājas Metalurgs	AKT	2	0	1	1	1	2	−1
Latvia	Spartaks Jūrmala	AST	2	1	1	0	2	1	+1
			**4**	**1**	**2**	**1**	**3**	**3**	**0**
Lithuania	Atlantas	SHA, KRT	4	3	1	0	11	1	+10
Lithuania	Trakai	IRT	2	0	1	1	0	1	−1
Lithuania	Žalgiris	AST	2	1	1	0	2	1	+1
			**8**	**4**	**3**	**1**	**13**	**3**	**+10**
Luxembourg	Differdange 03	ORD	2	1	0	1	4	4	0
Luxembourg	Fola Esch	KRT	2	2	0	0	7	2	+5
Luxembourg	Jeunesse Esch	TOB	2	0	2	0	1	1	0
			**6**	**3**	**2**	**1**	**12**	**7**	**+5**
Malta	Valletta	AST	2	2	0	0	9	1	+8
			**2**	**2**	**0**	**0**	**9**	**1**	**+8**
Moldova	Milsami Orhei	AKT, AST	4	2	1	1	7	5	+2
Moldova	Petrocub Hîncești	ORD	2	0	1	1	0	1	−1
Moldova	Sheriff Tiraspol	JEN, AKT	4	2	0	2	5	8	−3
Moldova	Zimbru Chişinău	OKZ, AST	4	2	1	1	5	4	+1
			**14**	**6**	**3**	**5**	**17**	**18**	**-1**
Montenegro	Budućnost Podgorica	AST	1	0	0	1	0	1	-1
Montenegro	Sutjeska Nikšić	AST	2	2	0	0	3	0	+3
			**3**	**2**	**0**	**1**	**3**	**1**	**+2**
Netherlands	AZ	AKT, SHA, KRT, AST	8	2	1	5	6	18	−12
			**8**	**2**	**1**	**5**	**6**	**18**	**-12**
Norway	Brann	AST	2	1	0	1	3	2	+1
Norway	Hødd	AKT	2	1	0	1	2	1	+1
Norway	Rosenborg	JEN, ORD	4	0	1	3	5	14	−9
			**8**	**2**	**1**	**5**	**10**	**17**	**-7**
Poland	Dyskobolia Grodzisk	TOB	2	0	0	2	0	3	−3
Poland	Polonia Warsaw	TOB	2	2	0	0	5	1	+4
Poland	Jagiellonia Białystok	IRT	2	1	0	1	2	1	+1
Poland	Lech Poznań	ZTS	2	0	1	1	1	3	−2
Poland	Legia Warsaw	AKT, AST, ORD	8	1	1	6	7	12	−5
Poland	Raków Częstochowa	AST	2	0	0	2	0	6	−6
Poland	Ruch Chorzów	SHA	2	0	0	2	1	3	−2
			**20**	**4**	**2**	**14**	**16**	**29**	**−13**
Portugal	Benfica	AST	2	0	1	1	2	4	−2
Portugal	Vitória de Guimarães	AST	1	0	1	0	1	1	0
Portugal	Sporting CP	AST, KRT	3	0	1	2	5	10	−5
			**6**	**0**	**3**	**3**	**8**	**15**	**-7**
Romania	Botoșani	ORD	1	0	0	1	1	2	-1
Romania	CFR Cluj	AST	2	1	0	1	2	3	-1
Romania	Corvinul Hunedoara	AST	2	2	0	0	8	2	+6
Romania	Sepsi OSK	AKT	2	0	1	1	1	2	-1
Romania	FCSB (Steaua București)	AKT, SHA	4	1	1	2	5	6	−1
			**11**	**4**	**2**	**5**	**17**	**15**	**+2**
Russia	Alania Vladikavkaz	AKT	2	0	2	0	2	2	0
			**2**	**0**	**2**	**0**	**2**	**2**	**0**
Scotland	Aberdeen	KRT	2	1	1	0	3	2	+1
Scotland	Celtic	SHA, AST, KRT	8	2	3	3	8	14	−6
			**10**	**3**	**4**	**3**	**11**	**16**	**-5**
Serbia	Čukarički	ORD	2	0	1	1	3	6	−3
Serbia	Jagodina	ORD	2	1	1	0	1	0	+1
Serbia	Red Star Belgrade	KRT, IRT	8	3	1	4	7	15	−8
Serbia	Partizan	AST	2	0	0	2	2	6	-4
Serbia	TSC	AST	1	1	0	0	1	0	+1
			**15**	**5**	**3**	**7**	**14**	**27**	**-13**
Slovakia	Artmedia	KRT	2	1	0	1	3	4	−1
Slovakia	Matador Púchov	ATY	2	0	1	1	0	2	−2
Slovakia	Ružomberok	TOB	2	1	0	1	3	5	−2
Slovakia	Žilina	TOB	2	0	0	2	0	6	−6
Slovakia	Slovan Bratislava	TOB, KRT	4	1	1	2	2	4	−2
Slovakia	ViOn Zlaté Moravce	ALM	2	0	1	1	2	4	−2
			**14**	**3**	**3**	**8**	**10**	**25**	**-15**
Slovenia	Koper	SHA	2	1	1	0	3	2	+1
Slovenia	Maribor	AST	2	1	0	1	3	2	+1
Slovenia	Olimpija Ljubljana	KRT	2	1	1	0	3	1	+2
			**6**	**3**	**2**	**1**	**9**	**5**	**+4**
Spain	Atlético Madrid	AST	2	0	1	1	0	4	−4
Spain	Villarreal	AST	4	0	0	4	3	13	−10
Spain	Real Madrid	KRT	1	0	0	1	0	5	−5
			**7**	**0**	**1**	**6**	**3**	**22**	**-19**
Sweden	AIK	AST	2	1	1	0	4	1	+3
			**2**	**1**	**1**	**0**	**4**	**1**	**+3**
Switzerland	Basel	TOB, KRT	6	1	1	4	9	13	−4
Switzerland	St. Gallen	TOB	2	0	0	2	1	5	−4
Switzerland	Young Boys	AST	2	0	1	1	0	3	−3
Switzerland	Lausanne-Sport	AST	2	0	0	2	1	5	−4
			**12**	**1**	**2**	**9**	**11**	**26**	**-15**
Turkey	Galatasaray	TOB, AST	4	0	3	1	4	6	−2
			**4**	**0**	**3**	**1**	**4**	**6**	**-2**
Ukraine	Dynamo Kyiv	AKT, AST	4	0	1	3	5	11	−6
Ukraine	Kolos Kovalivka	SHA	2	0	2	0	0	0	0
			**6**	**0**	**3**	**3**	**5**	**11**	**-6**
Wales	The New Saints	AST	1	0	0	1	0	2	−2
			**1**	**0**	**0**	**1**	**0**	**2**	**-2**
**Grand Total**			**394**	**127**	**89**	**178**	**452**	**560**	**-108**
