= Muminov =

Muminov is a surname. Notable people with the surname include:

- Ibragim Muminov (1908–1974), Uzbek philosopher
- Madiyar Muminov (born 1988), Uzbekistani footballer
- Shokir Muminov (born 1983), Uzbekistani judoka
- Tokhirjon Muminov (born 1970), Tajikistani footballer
