= Shatskikh =

Shatskikh or Shatskykh (Russian: Шацких or Шатских; Ukrainian: Шацьких) is a surname.

- Aleksandr Shatskikh (1974–2020), Kazakhstani footballer
- Maksim Shatskikh (born 1978), Uzbekistani footballer
- Oleg Shatskikh (born 1974), Uzbekistani footballer
- Volodymyr Shatskykh (born 1981), Ukrainian wrestler
