= Zhambyl Kukeyev =

Kazakhstani footballer (born 1988)

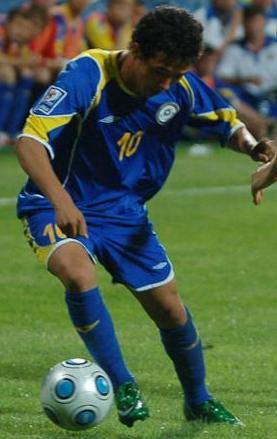

Personal information
- Date of birth: 20 September 1988 (age 38)
- Place of birth: Alma-Ata, Kazakhstan
- Height: 1.75 m (5 ft 9 in)
- Position: Attacking midfielder

Senior career*
| Years | Team | Apps | (Gls) |
| 2005 | Temirzholshy Almaty | 20 | (4) |
| 2006–2007 | Astana | 53 | (3) |
| 2008 | Alma-Ata | 27 | (6) |
| 2009–2010 | Lokomotiv Astana | 38 | (5) |
| 2011–2013 | Shakhter Karagandy | 60 | (15) |
| 2013–2016 | Kairat | 23 | (4) |
| 2017 | Kaisar | 9 | (0) |
| 2018–2020 | Aktobe | 54 | (2) |
| Total | | 284 | (39) |

International career^{‡}
| 2004 | Kazakhstan U-17 | 3 | (1) |
| 2006 | Kazakhstan U-19 | 3 | (1) |
| 2006–2009 | Kazakhstan U-21 | 9 | (0) |
| 2006–2015 | Kazakhstan | 28 | (2) |
- * Club domestic league appearances and goals as of 31 October 2020 ‡ National team caps and goals as of 30 July 2015

Zhambyl Kukeyev (Kazakh: Жамбыл Көкеев; Russian: Жамбыл Кукеев; born 20 September 1988) is a Kazakh footballer.

== Career ==
=== Club ===
In March 2014, Kukeyev was ruled out for the foreseeable future after picking up an injury during training.

=== International career ===
Kukeyev has made 20 appearances for the Kazakhstan national football team. He scored a goal in the 5–1 defeat to England, after taking advantage of an Ashley Cole mistake.

== Career statistics ==
=== Club ===
As of match played 3 November 2019

Appearances and goals by club, season and competition
| Club | Season | League | | | National Cup | | Continental | | Other | | Total | |
| Club | Season | Division | Apps | Goals | Apps | Goals | Apps | Goals | Apps | Goals | Apps | Goals |
|---|---|---|---|---|---|---|---|---|---|---|---|---|
| Temirzholshy Almaty | 2005 | Kazakhstan Premier League | 20 | 4 | 2 | 1 | – | | – | | 22 | 5 |
| Astana | 2006 | Kazakhstan Premier League | 27 | 3 | 6 | 0 | – | | – | | 33 | 3 |
| Astana | 2007 | Kazakhstan Premier League | 26 | 0 | 2 | 0 | 3 | 0 | – | | 31 | 0 |
| Astana | Total | | 53 | 3 | 8 | 0 | 3 | 0 | - | - | 64 | 3 |
| Alma-Ata | 2008 | Kazakhstan Premier League | 27 | 6 | 7 | 1 | – | | – | | 34 | 7 |
| Lokomotiv Astana | 2009 | Kazakhstan Premier League | 21 | 4 | 2 | 0 | – | | – | | 23 | 4 |
| Lokomotiv Astana | 2010 | Kazakhstan Premier League | 17 | 1 | 0 | 0 | – | | – | | 17 | 1 |
| Lokomotiv Astana | Total | | 38 | 5 | 2 | 0 | - | - | - | - | 40 | 5 |
| Shakhter Karagandy | 2011 | Kazakhstan Premier League | 27 | 9 | 1 | 0 | 4 | 1 | – | | 32 | 10 |
| Shakhter Karagandy | 2012 | Kazakhstan Premier League | 24 | 6 | 5 | 0 | – | | 1 | 0 | 30 | 6 |
| Shakhter Karagandy | 2013 | Kazakhstan Premier League | 9 | 0 | 0 | 0 | – | | 1 | 0 | 10 | 0 |
| Shakhter Karagandy | Total | | 60 | 15 | 6 | 0 | 4 | 1 | 2 | 0 | 72 | 16 |
| Kairat | 2013 | Kazakhstan Premier League | 14 | 2 | 0 | 0 | – | | – | | 14 | 2 |
| Kairat | 2014 | Kazakhstan Premier League | 1 | 0 | 0 | 0 | 0 | 0 | – | | 17 | 1 |
| Kairat | 2015 | Kazakhstan Premier League | 8 | 2 | 3 | 1 | 4 | 0 | 0 | 0 | 15 | 3 |
| Kairat | 2016 | Kazakhstan Premier League | 0 | 0 | 0 | 0 | 0 | 0 | 0 | 0 | 0 | 0 |
| Kairat | Total | | 23 | 4 | 3 | 1 | 4 | 0 | 0 | 0 | 30 | 5 |
| Kaisar | 2017 | Kazakhstan Premier League | 9 | 0 | 1 | 0 | – | | – | | 10 | 0 |
| Aktobe | 2018 | Kazakhstan Premier League | 25 | 2 | 0 | 0 | – | | – | | 25 | 2 |
| Aktobe | 2019 | Kazakhstan Premier League | 24 | 0 | 0 | 0 | – | | – | | 24 | 0 |
| Aktobe | Total | | 49 | 2 | 0 | 0 | - | - | - | - | 49 | 2 |
| Career total | | | 279 | 39 | 29 | 3 | 11 | 1 | 2 | 0 | 321 | 43 |

=== International ===
Kazakhstan national team
| Year | Apps | Goals |
|---|---|---|
| 2006 | 5 | 0 |
| 2007 | 3 | 0 |
| 2008 | 3 | 1 |
| 2009 | 7 | 0 |
| 2010 | 1 | 0 |
| 2011 | 4 | 1 |
| 2012 | 1 | 0 |
| 2013 | 2 | 0 |
| 2014 | 0 | 0 |
| 2015 | 2 | 0 |
| Total | 28 | 2 |

Statistics accurate as of match played 3 September 2015

=== International goals ===
| # | Date | Venue | Opponent | Score | Result | Competition |
|---|---|---|---|---|---|---|
| 1. | 11 October 2008 | Wembley Stadium, London, England | England | 1–2 | 1–5 | 2010 World Cup qualification |
| 2. | 10 August 2011 | Astana Arena, Astana, Kazakhstan | Syria | 1–1 | 1–1 | Friendly |
Correct as of 13 January 2013
