= Ýewgeniý Naboýçenko =

Turkmen footballer

Personal information
- Date of birth: 17 May 1970 (age 56)
- Place of birth: Ashgabat, Soviet Union
- Height: 1.86 m (6 ft 1 in)
- Position: Goalkeeper

Senior career*
Years	Team	Apps	(Gls)
1990–2000	Köpetdag Aşgabat		
2000–2007	Kairat	104	(0)
2007–2008	Megasport	38	(0)

International career
1997–2004	Turkmenistan	11	(0)

Managerial career
- 2012–: Aktobe (goalkeeping coach)
- * Club domestic league appearances and goals

Ýewgeniý Naboýçenko (born 17 May 1970), also spelled Eygeniy Naboychenko, is a Turkmen former football goalkeeper who represented Turkmenistan in the 2004 AFC Asian Cup. He also played for Kairat Almaty, Almaty, Megasport and Astana. Following his playing career, Kafanov Naboychenko became a goalkeeping coach at Aktobe.
