= Aleksandr Shatskikh =

Kazakh footballer (1974–2020)

Personal information
- Date of birth: 21 January 1974
- Place of birth: Taldıqorğan, Kazakh SSR, USSR
- Date of death: 30 November 2020 (aged 46)
- Height: 1.80 m (5 ft 11 in)
- Position: Striker

Senior career*
Years	Team	Apps	(Gls)
1990–1993	Zhetysu / Taldykorgan	102	(10)
1994–1996	Qaynar	75	(30)
1997	Chkalovets	30	(7)
1998	Astana Aqmola	24	(9)
1999	Irtysh Pavlodar	0	(0)
2000	CSKA-Qayrat Almaty	9	(6)
2001	Esil Bogatyr	24	(8)
2002	Irtysh Pavlodar	21	(13)
2003–2004	Zhenis Astana	38	(20)
2005–2006	Zhetysu	17	(4)
2007–2008	Megasport	50	(24)
2009	Lokomotiv Astana	2	(2)
Total		392	(133)

International career
2003	Kazakhstan	1	(0)
- * Club domestic league appearances and goals

Aleksandr Shatskikh (21 January 1974 – 30 November 2020) was a Kazakh footballer who played as a striker.

== Career ==
Born in Taldıqorğan, Shatskikh played club football for Zhetysu / Taldykorgan, Qaynar, Chkalovets, Astana Aqmola / Zhenis Astana, Irtysh Pavlodar, CSKA-Qayrat Almaty, Esil Bogatyr, Megasport and Lokomotiv Astana.

He earned one cap for the Kazakhstan national team in 2003.

He died on 30 November 2020, aged 46.
