= Dias Kamelov =

Kazakhstani footballer (born 1981)

Personal information
- Full name: Dias Kamelov
- Date of birth: 29 May 1981 (age 45)
- Place of birth: Soviet Union
- Height: 1.74 m (5 ft 8 1/2 in)
- Position: Midfielder

Senior career*
| Years | Team | Apps | (Gls) |
| 1997–2000 | Taraz | 52 | (0) |
| 2001–2002 | Atyrau | 28 | (2) |
| 2003–2004 | Irtysh | 28 | (1) |
| 2005 | Tobol | 8 | (0) |
| 2005–2006 | Astana | 25 | (1) |
| 2007 | Ordabasy | 16 | (1) |
| Total | | 157 | (5) |

International career
| 2004–2007 | Kazakhstan | 7 | (0) |
- * Club domestic league appearances and goals

Dias Kamelov (Kazakh: Диас Кәмелов; born 29 May 1981) is a Kazakhstani football midfielder. He plays for the club FC Zhetysu and capped for Kazakhstan national football team 7 times, including two qualifying matches for the 2006 FIFA World Cup.
