= Marko Mitrović (footballer, born 1978) =

Serbian football coach (born 1978)

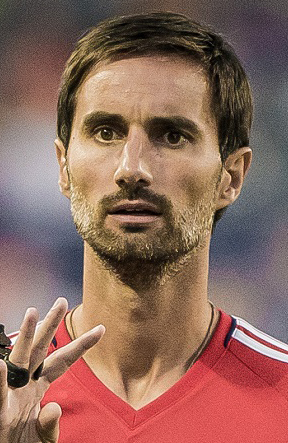
- Mitrović in 2017

Personal information
- Full name: Marko Mitrović
- Date of birth: 8 July 1978 (age 48)
- Place of birth: Belgrade, SR Serbia, SFR Yugoslavia
- Height: 1.80 m (5 ft 11 in)
- Position: Midfielder

Team information
- Current team: New England Revolution (head coach)

Youth career
- –1995: Red Star Belgrade

Senior career*
Years	Team	Apps	(Gls)
1995–1999	Red Star Belgrade	0	(0)
1995–1996	→ Voždovac (loan)		
1996–1997	→ Budućnost Valjevo (loan)		
1997–1999	→ Milicionar (loan)		
1999–2000	Zemun	2	(0)
2000–2001	Radnički Kragujevac	11	(1)
2001–2002	Vasas	10	(0)
2002–2005	Budućnost Banatski Dvor	85	(3)
2005–2006	Olimpik Baku	24	(1)
2006–2007	Banat Zrenjanin	43	(1)
2008	Atyrau	14	(1)
2008	Megasport	9	(2)
2009	Lokomotiv Astana	18	(0)
2010	Smederevo	14	(0)
Total		232	(9)

International career
1995	FR Yugoslavia U18	2	(0)

Managerial career
- 2011: Banat Zrenjanin (assistant)
- 2012: Napredak Kruševac (asst. & caretaker)
- 2012–2015: Serbia U20 (assistant)
- 2013–2015: Red Star Belgrade U15
- 2014–2016: Serbia U15
- 2016–2019: Chicago Fire (assistant)
- 2020–2022: Reading (assistant)
- 2022–2023: United States U19
- 2023–2024: United States U23
- 2024–2025: United States U20
- 2025–: New England Revolution
- * Club domestic league appearances and goals

Marko Mitrović (Serbian Cyrillic: Марко Митровић; born 8 July 1978) is a Serbian football coach who is the head coach of the New England Revolution in Major League Soccer. He previously served as the head coach of the United States U20 national team. A versatile midfielder, he could operate as a holding midfielder or a box to box player and spent most of his professional career in Serbia where he represented eight clubs. Other than in his own country, Mitrović also played professionally in Hungary, Azerbaijan, and Kazakhstan.

== Playing career ==
=== Club ===
Mitrović was a member of the Red Star Belgrade academy for several years, before signing his first professional contract with the club. He made his professional debut for Red Star Belgrade on 6 April 1996 against Novi Sad in a second game of the FR Yugoslavia Cup semifinals at the age of 17.

The next three seasons he spent on loan at FK Voždovac, FK Budućnost Valjevo and FK Milicionar. With FK Milicionar, he got promoted to the Super League during the 1997–98 season.

After leaving Red Star in summer 1999 he played for FK Zemun for 6 months. His next station was FK Radnički Kragujevac where he spent the 2000–01 season before he moved to Vasas SC, in the Hungarian Premier League, where he spent the 2001–02 season.

In 2002–03 he was signed by FK Budućnost Banatski Dvor. The club won the Second League in his first year and got promoted to the First League. In 2003–04 they played the Cup Final vs Red Star. They lost 0–1 but the club qualified for UEFA Cup.

In summer 2005 he moved to Olimpik Baku, Azerbaijan Premier League, where he spent one year, from 2005 to 2006.

In July 2006 he joined Banat Zrenjanin for another 18 months.

In January 2008 he signed for FC Atyrau. After 6 months he got transferred to FC Megasport. They were members of the Kazakhstan Premier League. At the end of 2008, they merged with Alma-Ata to form Lokomotiv Astana (today known as FC Astana). In December 2009 he left the club based on the league's new rules that foreigners older than 30 years old cannot be signed by Kazakhstan Premier League Clubs.

Spring 2010 he spent with Smederevo playing in Serbian Super League before he announced retirement from a professional playing career.

=== International ===
Mitrović represented the FR Yugoslavia national under-18 football team in 1995.

== Coaching career ==
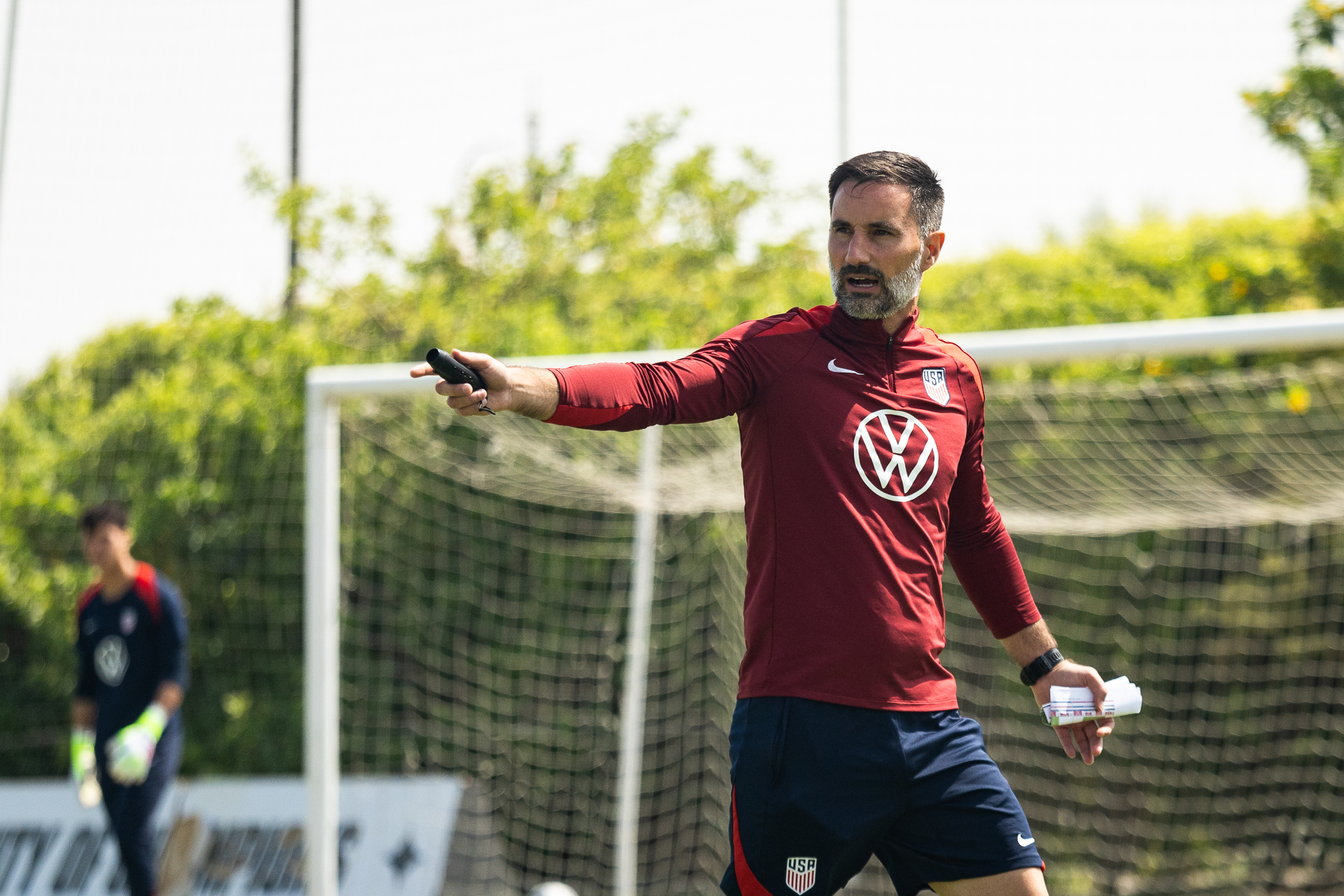
Mitrović giving instructions as a coach.

In summer 2011, Mitrović started his coaching career with his former club FK Banat Zrenjanin as an assistant coach under Milan Budisavljević in Serbian First League. In January 2012, he joined FK Napredak Kruševac as an assistant coach under former Red Star Belgrade head coach Aleksandar Kristić.

In summer 2012, Mitrović joined Veljko Paunović as first assistant coach for the Serbia U-18, U-19, and U-20 national teams. Under his involvement, the Serbia national team had the following accomplishments:

- First place at the FIFA U20 World Cup in New Zealand (2015),
- Third place a UEFA European Championship in Hungary (2014),
- First place at Elite Round,
- First place at UEFA Qualifiers - First Round in Serbia (2013).

Some players were promoted to Serbia National Team like Sergej Milinković-Savić, Nemanja Maksimović, Marko Grujić, Luka Jović, Andrija Živković, Miloš Veljković, Predrag Rajković, Mijat Gaćinović.

In summer 2013, Mitrović was in charge for the Red Star Belgrade Youth Academy U-15 and U-16 Team. He won first place in the 2013/14 season of the Serbian U-15 League. Players like Luka Ilić, Dejan Joveljić, Aleksa Terzić, Vladan Djekic and others were part of this generation, and Mitrović had an important role in their selection and development.

From December 2014 to December 2015, Mitrović was the head coach of Serbia U-15 national team. Players promoted to the Serbia senior team from this side included Sergej Milinković-Savić, Nemanja Maksimović, Marko Grujić, Luka Jović, Andrija Živković, Miloš Veljković, Predrag Rajković, and Mijat Gaćinović.

In January 2016, Mitrović was signed by MLS side Chicago Fire FC as an assistant coach, with Veljko Paunović as a head coach. He spent four years with the Chicago Fire, from January 2016 to November 2019.

In August 2017, Mitrović was assistant coach for the MLS All-Star Team vs Real Madrid.

During his time with the Chicago Fire, Mitrović had a chance to work with many national team players such as Bastian Schweinsteiger, Nicolás Gaitán, Aleksandar Katai, Nemanja Nikolić, David Accam, Dax McCarty, Djordje Mihailovic, Przemysław Frankowski, Francisco Calvo, Nicolas Hasler, Cristian Martínez, and Răzvan Cociș.

In September 2023, Mitrović was named head coach of the United States under-23 team for the 2024 Summer Olympics. After guiding the team to the quarter-finals, he moved to a new position within U.S. Soccer, becoming the national U-20 coach ahead of the 2025 FIFA U-20 World Cup.

=== New England Revolution ===
On 7 November 2025, Mitrović was named the head coach of Major League Soccer's New England Revolution. He filled out the Revolution's roster with many players he was familiar with from his time in the USMNT youth system, including Marcos Zambrano, Brooklyn Raines, Ethan Kohler, and Griffin Yow. He recorded his first win as Revolution manager on 15 March, a 6-1 victory over the Colorado Rapids. Mitrović's Revolution qualified for the 2026 MLS Cup Playoffs on October 14 following a 3-2 win over FC Cincinnati, This was the first time the club had qualified for the playoffs in three years. Ultimately, Mitrović's Revolution concluded the regular season with 18 wins, the second-highest tally in club history. Mitrović also led the Revolution to the CONCACAF Champions Cup, which they had not qualified for since 2024. He became one of only nine managers in league history to win 18 matches in his first season.

== Coaching statistics ==
As of matches played on 21 November 2026

Coaching record by team and tenure
Team	From	To	Record				
Team	From	To	P	W	D	L	Win %
United States U–19	19 April 2022	5 September 2023	6	6	0	0	100.0
United States U–23	6 September 2023	9 August 2024	13	6	3	4	46.2
United States U–20	1 October 2024	6 November 2025	14	8	2	4	57.1
New England Revolution	7 November 2025	present	36	18	5	13	50.0
Total			69	38	10	21	55.1

== Personal life ==
He is married and has three children with his wife Marija. He is fluent in four languages: English, Spanish, Serbian and Russian. In 1997 he graduated from the Belgrade Mathematical Gymnasium. He is a naturalized U.S. citizen.

His eldest son, Mitar, currently plays college soccer at Marquette University. His younger son, Matija, plays professionally and currently represents Vitória SC, a Portuguese club.
