= Murat Suyumagambetov =

Kazakhstani footballer

- Murat Suyumagambetov in 2008

Personal information
- Full name: Murat Suyumagambetov
- Date of birth: 14 October 1983 (age 43)
- Place of birth: Aktau, Kazakh SSR, Soviet Union
- Height: 1.80 m (5 ft 11 in)
- Position: Forward

Youth career
- Mangystau

Senior career*
Years	Team	Apps	(Gls)
2000–2002	Mangystau/Caspiy	21	(1)
2002–2004	Dostyk/Ordabasy	58	(11)
2004–2005	Tobol	20	(0)
2006	Ordabasy	28	(13)
2007	Astana	21	(10)
2008	Shakhter Karagandy	23	(2)
2009	Astana	9	(1)
2009	Ordabasy	14	(3)
2009–2010	Tobol	23	(3)
2011	Kairat	29	(3)
2012	Taraz	6	(0)
2013	Astana-1964	7	(0)
2013	Vostok	8	(0)
2014	Kyran	5	(0)

International career^{‡}
2004–2005	Kazakhstan U-21	4	(0)
2006–	Kazakhstan	19	(2)
- * Club domestic league appearances and goals as of 11 December 2015 ‡ National team caps and goals as of 9 July 2012

Murat Suyumagambetov (Kazakh: Мұрат Суюмағамбетов; born 14 October 1983 in Aktau) is a Kazakhstani football forward who last played for FC Kyran. He also plays for the Kazakhstan national football team.

== Career statistics ==
=== International goals ===
#	Date	Venue	Opponent	Score	Result	Competition
1.	7 February 2007	Tianhe Stadium, Guangzhou, China	China	2–1	Loss	Friendly
2.	11 March 2007	Kazhymukan Munaitpasov Stadium, Shymkent, Kazakhstan	Uzbekistan	1–1	Draw	Friendly
Correct as of 13 January 2017
