= Ruslan Sakhalbaev =

Kazakhstani footballer (born 1984)

Ruslan Kasymkhanovich Sakhalbaev (Russian: Руслан Сахалбаев; born 17 June 1984) is a Kazakhstani footballer who plays as a midfielder for Kairat.

== Early life ==
Sakhalbaev was born in 1984 in Kazakhstan. He initially almost retired from professional football to play futsal.

== Career ==
Sakhalbaev started his career with Kazakhstani side Kairat. He helped the club win the 2003 Kazakhstan Cup. He has held the record for the most appearances in the Kazakhstan Premier League.

== Personal life ==
Sakhalbaev is married and his wife Ainur and he have a son, Alan.
