= Siniša Branković =

Serbian footballer

Personal information
- Date of birth: 30 January 1979 (age 47)
- Place of birth: Batajnica, SFR Yugoslavia
- Height: 1.84 m (6 ft 1/2 in)
- Position: Midfielder

Youth career
- BSK Batajnica

Senior career*
Years	Team	Apps	(Gls)
- BSK Batajnica
2000–2003	Zemun	64	(2)
2003–2005	Chornomorets Odesa	33	(1)
2005–2006	MKT Araz	21	(0)
2006–2007	Kapfenberger SV	22	(0)
2007–2008	Banat Zrenjanin	14	(1)
2008	Kairat	27	(0)
2009	Zhetysu	23	(0)
- * Club domestic league appearances and goals

Siniša Branković (born 30 January 1979) is a Serbian retired footballer.

== Career ==
Branković began playing football with BSK Batajnica before joining First League of FR Yugoslavia side FK Zemun in 2000.

Branković left Zemun to play in the Ukrainian Premier League with FC Chornomorets Odesa. He also played for Austrian Football First League side Kapfenberger SV during the 2006–07 season. Most recently he played for Kazakhstan Premier League sides FC Kairat and FC Zhetysu.
