= Aleksandr Bagayev =

Russian footballer

Personal information
- Full name: Aleksandr Aleksandrovich Bagayev
- Date of birth: 17 April 1985 (age 41)
- Height: 1.88 m (6 ft 2 in)
- Position: Forward

Senior career*
Years	Team	Apps	(Gls)
2002	FC Primorets St. Petersburg		
2003	FC Dynamo-SPb St. Petersburg	4	(0)
2003	FC Priozersk-Dynamo Priozersk		
2004	FC Salyut-Energiya Belgorod	10	(0)
2005	FC Volga Tver	2	(0)
2006	KuPS	0	(0)
2006	AC Oulu	5	(0)
2006	→ Tervarit		(16)
2006	FC Ruan Saint Petersburg		
2007	PS Kemi Kings	24	(13)
2008–2009	FC Taraz	44	(26)
2010	FC SKA-Energiya Khabarovsk	12	(0)
2010	FC Irtysh Omsk	18	(1)
2011–2012	FC Chelyabinsk	35	(7)
- * Club domestic league appearances and goals

Aleksandr Aleksandrovich Bagayev (Russian: Александр Александрович Багаев; born 17 April 1985) is a former Russian professional footballer.

== Club career ==
He played two seasons in the Russian Football National League for FC Dynamo-SPb St. Petersburg, FC SKA-Energiya Khabarovsk and FC Irtysh Omsk.
