= Patrick Ovie =

Nigerian footballer

Personal information
- Date of birth: 2 June 1978 (age 48)
- Place of birth: Lagos, Nigeria
- Height: 1.82 m (6 ft 0 in)
- Position: Defender

Senior career*
Years	Team	Apps	(Gls)
1996–1999	Shooting Stars	?	(?)
1999–2001	Ironi Rishon LeZion	64	(1)
2001–2005	Krylia Sovetov	85	(2)
2005–2006	Dinamo Moscow	12	(0)
2009	Lokomotiv Astana	17	(1)

International career
2001–2003	Nigeria	4	(0)
- * Club domestic league appearances and goals

Patrick Ovie (born 2 June 1978) is a Nigerian former footballer who played as a defender.

== Club career ==
Born in Lagos, Ovie started his professional career with Shooting Stars of Nigeria, before moving to Israel, where he spent two years. In 2002, Ovie joined Russian Premier League side Krylia Sovetov, where he spent the next three and a half years before joining FC Dynamo Moscow in the summer of 2006, alongside his countryman Joseph Enakarhire. He retired in December 2009 from his professional football career to care his sick wife.

== International career ==
His performances for Krylia Sovetov earned him several caps for Nigeria.

== Personal life ==
He is Kadiri Ikhana's son in law.
