= Madiyar Muminov =

Uzbekistani footballer (born 1984)

Personal information
- Full name: Madiyar Absamatovich Muminov
- Date of birth: 18 October 1980 (age 46)
- Place of birth: Uzbekistan
- Positions: Defender; midfielder

Senior career*
Years	Team	Apps	(Gls)
2005–2006	Metallurg	34	(3)
2007–2008	Megasport	41	(2)
2009	Astana	13	(2)
2010	Ordabasy	30	(2)
2011	Kairat	11	(0)
2011	Mash'al	0	(0)
2012–2013	Taraz	26	(1)
2014–2015	Kyran	47	(7)
- * Club domestic league appearances and goals

Madiyar Absamatovich Muminov (Russian: Мадияр Муминов; born 18 October 1988) is an Uzbekistani former footballer who played as a defender and midfielder.

== Early life ==
Muminov was born in 1988 in Uzbekistan. He is an ethnic Kazakh.

== Career ==
Muminob started his career with Uzbekistani side Metallurg. In 2007, he signed for Kazakhstani side Megasport. In 2009, he signed for Kazakhstani side Astana. In 2010, he signed for Kazakhstani side Ordabasy. In 2011, he signed for Kazakhstani side Kairat. After that, he signed for Uzenkistani side Mash'al. In 2012, he signed for Kazakhstani side Taraz. He was described as "unable to break into the Taraz team" while playing for the club. In 2014, he signed for Kazakhstani side Kyran.

== Personal life ==
After retiring from professional football, Muminov worked as a youth manager. He obtained a Kazakhstani passport which was found to be false.
