= Sergei Larin =

Kazakhstani footballer and manager

Personal information
- Full name: Sergei Vladimirovich Larin
- Date of birth: 22 July 1986 (age 40)
- Place of birth: Almaty, Soviet Union
- Height: 1.80 m (5 ft 11 in)
- Position: Midfielder

Team information
- Current team: FC Astana (massagist coach)

Youth career
- 2001–2002: Tsesna Almaty

Senior career*
Years	Team	Apps	(Gls)
2003–2004	Tsesna Almaty	19	(4)
2004–2008	FC Almaty	128	(5)
2009–2010	FC Lokomotiv Astana	1	(0)
2010–2013	FC Atyrau	9	(1)

International career
2005–2008	Kazakhstan	26	(0)

Managerial career
- 2013–present: FC Astana (massagist coach)
- * Club domestic league appearances and goals

Sergei Vladimirovich Larin (Russian: Сергей Владимирович Ларин; born 22 July 1986, in Almaty) is a Kazakhstani football manager and former player, He is currently massagist coach of FC Astana.

== Career ==
Larin began his career by Tsesna Almaty who played in his first professional season nineteen games and scored four goals. After this big debut he played 128 games for FC Almaty in five years before signed for a new founded club FC Lokomotiv Astana, where he played only one game in six months and signed in summer 2009 for FC Atyrau.

== International career ==
He was three years member of the Kazakhstan national football team and played in 26 games before in summer 2008 retired from his international career.
