= Roman Nesterenko =

Kazakhstani footballer

Personal information
- Full name: Roman Hryhoriyvich Nesterenko
- Date of birth: 22 March 1977 (age 49)
- Place of birth: Vuhledar, Ukrainian SSR
- Height: 5 ft 11 in (1.80 m)
- Position: Goalkeeper

Senior career*
Years	Team	Apps	(Gls)
1994–1995	AFK-UOK Mariupol	15	(0)
1995–1997	Shakhtar-2 Donetsk	49	(0)
1999–2000	Metalurh Volodymyrivka	44	(0)
2000–2004	Volyn Lutsk	35	(0)
2004–2006	Aktobe	64	(0)
2007–2008	Kaisar	53	(0)
2009	Lokomotiv Astana	15	(0)
2010	Kaisar	10	(0)
2011–2012	Ordabasy	29	(1)
2013	Vostok	24	(0)
2015–2016	Kyzylzhar	21	(0)

International career
2011	Kazakhstan	2	(0)

Managerial career
- 2022-2023: FSC Mariupol
- * Club domestic league appearances and goals

Roman Nesterenko (born 22 March 1977) is a football coach and former player who is currently the goalkeeper coach for Lithuanian club DFK Dainava. He had previously been the head coach for FSC Mariupol from 2022 to 2023.

Born in Ukraine, he played as a goalkeeper, and has represented the Kazakhstan national football team, for whom he has earned two caps.

== Club career ==
=== Early career ===
Nesterenko began his career with AFK-UOR Mariupol in Ukraine in 1994–95. However, later in the same season he left for another Ukrainian side, FC Shakhtar-2 Donetsk, the reserve side of Shakhtar Donetsk. Nesterenko played for the club for three seasons, leaving in 1998 to join Metalurh Volodymyrivka. He spent two years at Metalurh, making over twenty appearances in each of his seasons there.

=== Volyn Lutsk ===
Roman joined Volyn in 2000–01, when the club was in the Persha Liha, Ukraine's second division. In his four seasons at the club, Nesterenko helped Volyn reach the Ukrainian Premier League in 2001–02 despite being used mainly as a back-up goalkeeper and only making eight appearances in their promotion-winning season. He made six appearances in 2002–03 as Volyn finished an impressive sixth in their first season back in the top flight.

=== FK Aktobe ===
Nesterenko joined a team from Kazakhstan for the first time in his career in 2004. His became a regular for FK Aktobe, making 32 appearances in his first season with the club as they finished in fourth place, just five points off an UEFA Cup spot. In 2005 Aktobe won the league by a single point, with Nesterenko playing in 26 of their 30 league games. Aktobe conceded just 27 goals all season.

2006 was to be Nesterenko's final year with FK Aktobe, and they finished in second place in the league, qualifying for the UEFA Cup. He played in Aktobe's subsequent UEFA Cup qualification matches against FK Liepājas Metalurgs of Latvia, which were played in July 2006 and resulted in a 1–1 draw and 1–0 loss for Aktobe. However, Roman played just six times in the league and had lost his place as the club's first choice goalkeeper. Therefore, it came as no surprise when he left for Kaysar Kyzylorda in 2007.

=== Kaysar Kyzylorda ===
Kaysar provided Roman with the chance to be a first-choice goalkeeper again, and he made 27 appearances in 2007 as Kaysar finished tenth in the Kazakhstan Premier League. He followed this up with another 26 appearances in 2008, when the club finished fourth, but despite regular playing time at Kaysar he moved on again, this time to Lokomotiv Astana. He would return to Kaysar in 2010.

=== Lokomotiv Astana ===
After attending a trial along with two team-mates while playing for Kaysar Kyzylorda, Astana signed Roman as one of their goalkeepers in December 2008. Lokomotiv Astana had only been formed after a merger in 2009, but being a wealthy club they were able to recruit players of high quality to play alongside Nesterenko in the new club's first season in the Kazakhstan Premier League. Astana finished in second place in 2009, five points behind Roman's former club FK Aktobe. Nesterenko played in 15 of the club's 25 league games, but at the end of the season he departed Astana to rejoin former club Kaysar Kyzylorda, who had been relegated from the top-flight in 2009. Unusually for a goalkeeper, Roman wore the number 32shirt for Lokomotiv Astana.

=== Return to Kaysar Kyzylorda ===
Despite having dropped to the Kazakhstan First Division for the first time in his career, Nesterenko only made ten appearances in his second spell for Kaysar. The club managed to win promotion back to the Premier League by finishing in second place. He left after the promotion season, joining FC Ordabasy of the Kazakhstan Premier League, who became the eighth club of a lengthy career.

=== FC Ordabasy ===
In 2010 FC Ordabasy had finished in eighth place, having to compete in the relegation group to keep their top-flight status. However, in 2011 they fared better, finishing in sixth place with Nesterenko as their first-choice goalkeeper. He made twenty-five appearances in his debut season with the club, making his FC Ordabasy debut against Tobol in a 1–0 win on 6 March 2011, in the first league game of the season. Nesterenko kept a total of seven clean sheets from his twenty-five league games. He also played in cup victories over former club Kaysar Kyzylorda on 20 April and FC Sunkar on 11 May. Despite this, Nesterenko was an unused substitute in Ordabasy's 1–0 2011 Kazakhstan Cup final win over FC Tobol on 13 November. This cup win qualified Ordabasy for the 2012–13 UEFA Europa League first round despite the club's mid-table 2011 Kazakhstan Premier League finish.

== International career ==
Nesterenko made his international debut at the unlikely age of 34, with manager Miroslav Beránek including him in his squad for 2011 friendlies and qualifying matches. His first game for Kazakhstan was a UEFA Euro 2012 Group A qualifier against Azerbaijan. Kazakhstan won 2–1, with Nesterenko playing the whole match. He won his second international cap in a 1–1 friendly draw with Syria on 10 August 2011. Roman was replaced at half-time by Anton Tsirin, despite having kept a clean sheet in the first half.
