= FC Alma-Ata =

Alma-Ata
- Full name: Football Club Alma-Ata
- Founded: 2000; 26 years ago
- Dissolved: 2008; 18 years ago
- Ground: Central Stadium; Almaty
- Capacity: 23,000
- League: Kazakhstan Premier League
- 2008: 8th
Home colours	Away colours

FC Alma-Ata (Kazakh: Алматы футбол клубы, romanized: Almaty futbol kluby) was a Kazakh association football club based in Almaty between 2000 and 2008.

== History ==
In 2000 the club was formed as FC Tsesna in Almaty. Tsesna played in the Kazakhstan First Division for the first time in 2003, finishing second and earning themselves promotion to the Kazakhstan Premier League. Following their promotion, the club's management changed the club's name to FC Alma-Ata, finishing their debut season in 18th position under the management of Edgar Gess. The following season, first under Igor Romanov, and then Antonius Joore, the club improved its standing and finished 13th. 2006 was the club's best season; again with Antonius Joore as their manager, the club finished 5th in the league and won the Kazakhstan Cup for the first time. As a result of their Cup win, they qualified for the 2007–08 UEFA Cup for the first time.

In July 2007 Alma-Ata appointed Arno Pijpers as a consultant, whilst he continued his Kazakhstan national team duties, in preparation for their debut UEFA Cup matches against Slovak side ViOn Zlaté Moravce. Alma-Ata were defeat by ViOn Zlaté Moravce 4–2 over the two legs, whilst finishing 6th in the league and reaching the Last 32 of the Cup. The 2008 season was the club's last season, as after finishing 8th in the League and as Cup runners-up, Alma-Ata declared themselves bankrupt and ceased operations, with the majority of the club's staff joining FC Megasport before forming FC Lokomotiv Astana.

=== Names ===
- 2000 : Founded as Tsesna
- 2004 : Renamed Alma-Ata

=== Domestic history ===
Season	League									Kazakhstan Cup	Top goalscorer		Manager
Season	Div.	Pos.	Pl.	W	D	L	GS	GA	P	Kazakhstan Cup	Name	League	Manager
2003	2nd	2	22	15	3	4	61	22	48	1/16	(Kazakhstan) Yerlan Urazayev	20	
2004	1st	18	36	4	8	24	22	53	20	1/8	(Kazakhstan) Sergei Ostapenko & (Kazakhstan) Yerlan Urazayev	4	(Germany) E.Gess
2005	1st	13	30	9	3	18	30	43	30	1/8	(Kazakhstan) Sergei Ostapenko & (Kazakhstan) Oleg Litvinenko	7	(Kazakhstan) I.Romanov / (Netherlands) A.Joore
2006	1st	5	30	13	9	8	36	29	48	Winner	(Uzbekistan) Jafar Irismetov	17	(Netherlands) A.Joore
2007	1st	6	30	13	5	12	35	32	44	1/16	(Uzbekistan) Jafar Irismetov	17	(Netherlands) A.Joore / (Kazakhstan) G.Babayan
2008	1st	8	30	10	7	13	33	39	37	Runners-up	(Kazakhstan) Zhambyl Kukeyev	6	(Netherlands) M.Wilhelmus / (Germany) B.Storck

=== Continental history ===
Season	Competition	Round	Club	Home	Away	Aggregate
2007–08	UEFA Cup	First qualifying round	(Slovakia) ViOn Zlaté Moravce	1–1	1–3	2–4

== Honours ==
- Kazakhstan Cup
  - Winners (1): 2006

== See also ==
- Kazakhstan football clubs in European cups
