= 2006 Kazakhstan Premier League =

Kazakhstan Premier League
- Season: 2006
- Champions: Astana
- Champions League: Astana
- UEFA Cup: Aktobe; Almaty
- UEFA Intertoto Cup: Tobol
- Top goalscorer: Jafar Irismetov (17)

The 2006 Kazakhstan Premier League was the 15th season of the Kazakhstan Premier League, the highest football league competition in Kazakhstan, and took place between 31 March and 10 November.

== Teams ==
For the 2006 season, Kaisar and Energetik were promoted to the Premier League, replacing Zhetysu and Bolat MSK who were relegated.

Before the start of the season Zhenis Astana became Astana.

=== Team overview ===
Locations of teams in the 2006 Kazakhstan Premier League

Team	Location	Venue	Capacity
Aktobe	Aktobe	Central Stadium	13,200
Almaty	Almaty	Central Stadium	23,804
Astana	Astana	Kazhymukan Munaitpasov Stadium	12,350
Atyrau	Atyrau	Munaishy Stadium	9,500
Ekibastuzets	Ekibastuz	Shakhtyor Stadium	6,300
Energetic	Ekibastuz	Shakhter	6,300
Esil Bogatyr	Petropavl	Karasai Stadium	11,000
Irtysh	Pavlodar	Central Stadium	15,000
Kairat	Almaty	Central Stadium	23,804
Kaisar	Kyzylorda	Gani Muratbayev Stadium	7,000
Okzhetpes	Kokshetau	Okzhetpes Stadium	4,158
Ordabasy	Shymkent	Kazhimukan Munaitpasov Stadium	20,000
Shakhter Karagandy	Karagandy	Shakhter Stadium	20,000
Taraz	Taraz	Central Stadium	12,525
Tobol	Kostanay	Central Stadium	8,323
Vostok	Oskemen	Vostok Stadium	8,500

== League table ==
Pos	Team	Pld	W	D	L	GF	GA	GD	Pts	Qualification or relegation
1	Astana (C)	30	19	7	4	45	23	+22	64	Qualification for the Champions League first qualifying round
2	Aktobe	30	18	6	6	48	21	+27	60	Qualification for the UEFA Cup first qualifying round
3	Tobol	30	16	8	6	43	22	+21	56	Qualification for the Intertoto Cup first round
4	Shakhter Karagandy	30	15	5	10	35	24	+11	50	
5	Alma-Ata	30	13	9	8	36	29	+7	48	Qualification for the UEFA Cup first qualifying round
6	Irtysh	30	13	8	9	34	24	+10	47	
7	Kairat	30	12	10	8	39	30	+9	46	
8	Ekibastuzets	30	12	6	12	29	28	+1	42	
9	Vostok	30	9	8	13	33	40	−7	35	
10	Taraz	30	9	6	15	32	34	−2	33	
11	Okzhetpes	30	8	9	13	23	36	−13	33	
12	Esil Bogatyr	30	8	9	13	20	37	−17	33	
13	Ordabasy	30	8	8	14	29	36	−7	32	
14	Atyrau	30	8	5	17	25	47	−22	29	
15	Kaisar	30	8	4	18	29	53	−24	28	
16	Energetic (R)	30	6	8	16	28	44	−16	26	Relegation to the Kazakhstan First Division

Source: http://www.kpfl.kz/eng/chempionat_2006
Rules for classification: 1) points; 2) goal difference; 3) number of goals scored.
(C) Champions; (R) Relegated

== Results ==
Home \ Away	ALM	AKT	AST	ATY	EKI	ENE	ESI	IRT	KRT	KSR	OKZ	ORD	SHA	TAR	TOB	VOS
Almaty		4–2	1–3	1–0	2–1	0–1	1–1	1–0	3–0 (Note: Match awarded.)	3–0	0–0	1–0	1–0	2–1	0–0	1–0
Aktobe	3–0		2–2	3–0	1–0	1–0	2–0	3–0	2–1	5–0	1–0	3–0	0–0	2–0	2–0	2–0
Astana	1–0	1–0		3–2	0–0	3–1	3–1	0–0	2–1	2–3	0–0	2–0	4–1	0–1	0–2	3–1
Atyrau	2–1	3–2	0–1		3–1	1–1	0–0	0–2	0–1	2–0	1–2	0–0	0–2	1–0	2–1	3–2
Ekibastuzets	1–1	1–0	0–0	4–1		1–0	1–0	1–0	0–0	1–2	2–0	3–1	0–1	1–0	2–1	2–1
Energetic	1–1	1–1	0–2	5–0	2–2		0–0	2–3	0–2	2–1	0–0	3–0	1–0	0–0	1–2	0–0
Esil Bogatyr	1–1	0–1	1–1	0–1	2–1	2–0		1–0	1–1	1–0	1–1	1–0	2–1	2–1	1–2	1–0
Irtysh Pavlodar	3–2	1–2	0–1	0–0	1–0	0–1	5–0		0–0	2–0	1–0	1–1	1–0	3–0	1–0	2–2
Kairat	3–2	1–2	1–2	2–1	3–1	3–1	4–0	1–1		2–3	2–0	1–0	1–0	0–0	0–0	0–0
Kaisar	1–2	0–2	0–1	1–1	0–1	2–1	1–1	0–0	2–1		3–1	1–2	0–1	1–0	1–1	3–1
Okzhetpes	0–1	0–0	1–1	1–0	2–1	3–1	2–0	0–2	2–1	1–4		1–1	0–0	1–0	1–1	1–0
Ordabasy	0–0	2–0	0–1	3–0	0–1	0–0	0–0	3–1	0–0	3–0	2–1		5–1	0–0	0–2	1–0
Shakhter Karagandy	1–0	0–0	0–1	3–1	1–0	1–0	2–0	1–2	1–1	2–1	5–0	3–2		2–1	1–0	3–0
Taraz	1–2	1–1	1–2	3–0	2–0	2–1	3–0	1–1	1–2	3–0	1–0	3–2	1–0		2–3	2–2
Tobol	1–1	2–1	1–0	1–0	0–0	3–0	1–0	0–1	3–0	5–1	1–0	4–1	3–1	1–0		1–1
Vostok	1–1	1–2	2–3	1–0	1–0	3–1	1–0	1–0	1–1	2–1	3–2	2–0	1–2	2–1	1–1	

Legend: Blue = home team win; Yellow = draw; Red = away team win.

== Season statistics ==
=== Top scorers ===
As of match played 10 November 2006

Rank	Player	Club	Goals
1	(Uzbekistan) Jafar Irismetov	Alma-Ata	17
2	(Moldova) Serghei Rogaciov	Aktobe	16
2	(Kazakhstan) Andrei Finonchenko	Shakhter	16
4	(Kazakhstan) Nurbol Zhumaskaliyev	Tobol	14
5	(Kazakhstan) Murat Suyumagambetov	Ordabasy	13
6	(Kazakhstan) Murat Tleshev	Astana/Irtysh	12
7	(Russia) Konstantin Golovskoy	Aktobe	11
8	(Uzbekistan) Alibek Buleshev	Kairat	10
8	(Turkmenistan) Didargylyç Urazow	Irtysh	10
8	(Kazakhstan) Vasiliy Prosekov	Energetik	10
