= FC Zhenis =

Zhenis
- Full name: Football Club Zhenis; Жеңіс футбол клубы
- Founded: 1964; 62 years ago
- Ground: Astana Arena; Astana, Kazakhstan
- Capacity: 23,000
- Chairman: Mukhammet Japarov
- Manager: Vladimir Slišković
- League: Kazakhstan Premier League
- 2024: 10th
- Website: jenisfk.kz
| Home colours | Away colours |

FC Zhenis (Kazakh: Жеңіс футбол клубы) is a Kazakh professional football club based at the K. Munaitpasov Stadium in Astana. Founding members of the Kazakhstan Premier League, they were relegated to First Division for the first time in 2009 after being declared bankrupt. The club has won the national championship on three occasions.

== History ==
In January 2015, Astana-1964 dropped out of the Kazakhstan First Division to the regional Astana Championship.

=== Names ===
- 1964 : Dinamo
- 1975 : Tselinnik
- 1994 : Tsesna
- 1996 : Tselinnik
- 1997 : Astana
- 1999 : Zhenis
- 2006 : Astana
- 2009 : Namys
- 2010 : Astana
- 2011 : Astana-1964
- 2021 : Zhenis

=== Continental history ===
Astana-1964 has already played in qualifying stages of European cups. Last time they lost in the second qualifying round of the 2007/8 Champions League to Norway's Rosenborg after overcoming Georgian champions FC Olimpi Rustavi in the first qualifying round 3–0 on aggregate.

| Season | Competition | Round | Club | Home | Away | Aggregate |
|---|---|---|---|---|---|---|
| 2002–03 | UEFA Champions League | First qualifying round | (Moldova) Sheriff Tiraspol | 3–2 | 1–2 | 4–4(a) |
| 2003–04 | UEFA Cup | First qualifying round | (Czech Republic) Viktoria Žižkov | 1–3 | 0–3 | 1–6 |
| 2007–08 | UEFA Champions League | First qualifying round | (Georgia (country)) Metalurgi Rustavi | 3–0 | 0–0 | 3–0 |
| 2007–08 | UEFA Champions League | Second qualifying round | (Norway) Rosenborg | 1–3 | 1–7 | 2–10 |

== Stadium ==
Astana-1964 played their home games at the 12,350 capacity Kazhymukan Munaitpasov Stadium.

== Current squad ==
As of 1 August, 2026

Note: Flags indicate national team as defined under FIFA eligibility rules; some limited exceptions apply. Players may hold more than one non-FIFA nationality.

| No. | Pos. | Nation | Player |
|---|---|---|---|
| 1 | GK | KAZ | Ilya Sotnik |
| 3 | DF | GHA | Patrick Kpozo |
| 4 | DF | KAZ | Marat Bystrov |
| 5 | DF | GEO | Zurab Tevzadze |
| 7 | MF | KAZ | Islambek Kuat |
| 8 | MF | KAZ | Madi Khaseyn |
| 9 | FW | UKR | Vladyslav Naumets |
| 10 | MF | GEO | Luka Imnadze |
| 11 | FW | CRO | Andrija Filipović |
| 13 | DF | KAZ | Sagadat Tursynbay |
| 14 | DF | KAZ | Ardak Saulet |

| No. | Pos. | Nation | Player |
|---|---|---|---|
| 17 | DF | KAZ | Aldair Adilov |
| 18 | MF | KAZ | Bayzhan Madelkhan |
| 19 | FW | BRA | Adílio |
| 21 | FW | KAZ | Batykhan Kamaradinov |
| 29 | MF | KAZ | Samat Zharynbetov |
| 41 | GK | BLR | Maksim Plotnikov |
| 63 | DF | BIH | Ivan Šaravanja |
| 72 | DF | KAZ | Mikael Askarov |
| 77 | GK | KAZ | Nursayat Shanshar |
| 88 | MF | BRA | Gian |
| 93 | FW | BRA | Élder Santana |

=== Out on loan ===
Note: Flags indicate national team as defined under FIFA eligibility rules; some limited exceptions apply. Players may hold more than one non-FIFA nationality.

| No. | Pos. | Nation | Player |

== Honours ==
- Kazakhstan Premier League: 3
  - 2000, 2001, 2006
- Kazakhstan Cup: 3
  - 2001, 2002, 2005

== Notable managers ==
The following managers won at least one trophy when in charge of Astana:

| Name | Period | Trophies |
|---|---|---|
| (Kazakhstan) Sergey Gorohovodatsky | 2000 | Kazakhstan Premier League |
| (Russia) Vladimir Dergach | 2001–2002 | Kazakhstan Premier League, Kazakhstan Cup |
| (Kazakhstan) Vladimir Fomichev/Igor Svechnikov | 2002 | Kazakhstan Cup |
| (Russia) Aleksandr Irkhin | 2003, 2007–2008 | Kazakhstan Cup |
| (Russia) Vladimir Mukhanov | 2005 | Kazakhstan Cup |
| (Netherlands) Arno Pijpers | 2006 | Kazakhstan Premier League |

== See also ==
- Kazakhstani football clubs in European competitions
