= FC Megasport =

Megasport
- Full name: Football Club Megasport
- Founded: 2005; 21 years ago
- Dissolved: 2008; 18 years ago
- Ground: Central Stadium; Almaty, Kazakhstan
- Capacity: 25,057
- League: Defunct
- 2008: 5th
Home colours	Away colours

Football Club Megasport (Kazakh: «Мегаспорт» футбол клубы, «Megasport» Fýtbol Klýby) were a Kazakh professional football club based in Almaty. The club was founded in 2005. In 2007, they secured promotion to the Kazakhstan Premier League. At the end of 2008, they merged with Alma-Ata to form Lokomotiv Astana.

== Achievements ==
- Kazakhstan First Division Runner-Up: 1

2006-2007
