= Kazakhstan national football team results =

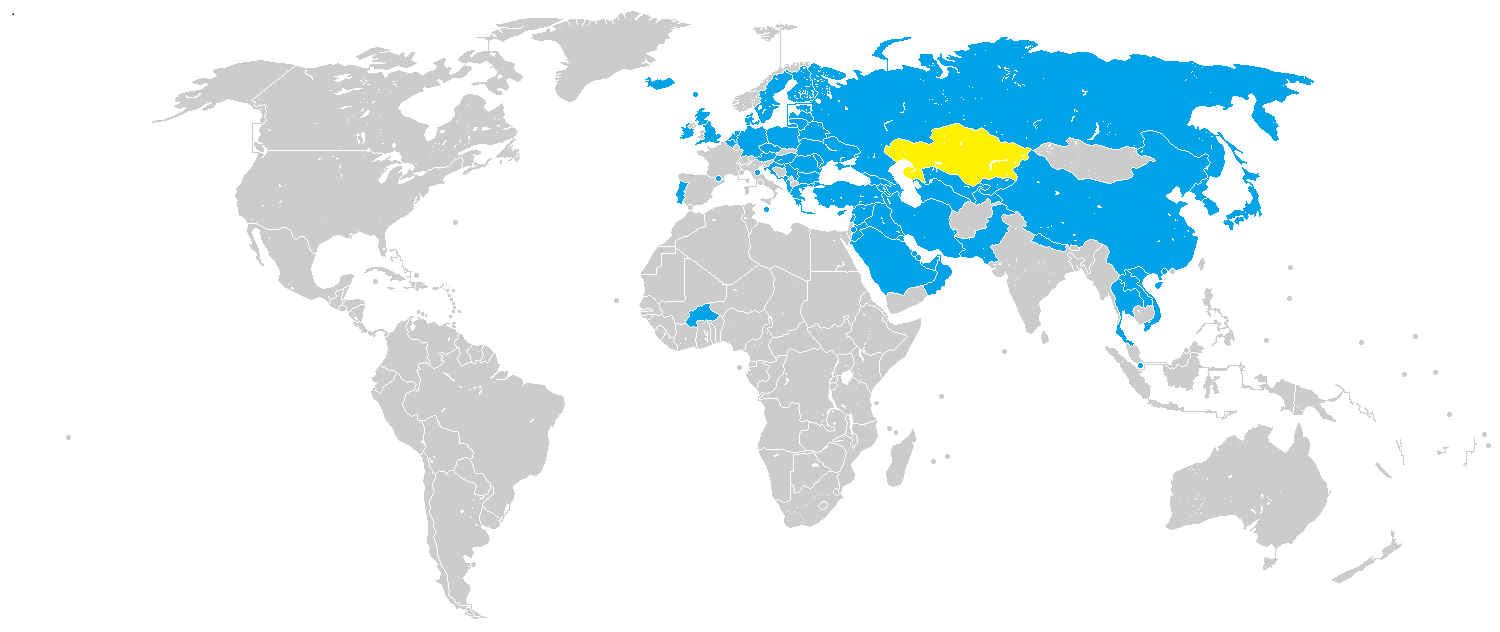
Kazakhstan national football team all opponents

This page shows the Kazakhstan national football team's results in International matches from the 1990s onwards, as recognized by FIFA.

== Overview of results ==
As of Match played 2 October 2026

Type	Record						
Type	G	W	D	L	GF	GA	Win %
Friendly Matches	80	21	22	37	84	116	26.25
FIFA World Cup qualification	76	14	16	46	85	161	18.42
AFC Asian Cup Qualification	8	4	0	4	9	9	50
UEFA European Championship Qualification	55	13	8	34	45	54	23.64
UEFA Nations League	29	7	7	15	26	44	24.14
Other Tournaments	9	4	1	4	13	15	44.44
Total	254	61	53	140	264	440	24.02

== Results by decades ==
As of 2 October 2026

Year	GP	W	D	L	GF	GA	GD
1990s	36	13	10	13	41	45	-4
2000s	85	18	18	49	92	152	-60
2010s	78	17	18	43	79	139	-60
2020s	64	17	11	35	62	109	–47
Total	263	66	57	140	272	445	–173

== Best / Worst Results ==
=== Best ===
As of 10 October 2025

Number	Year	Opponent	Result
1	1997	Pakistan	7–0
2	2014	Kyrgyzstan	7–1
3	2001	Nepal	6–0
4	1998	Laos	5–0
5	2001	Macau	5–0
6–10		5 times	4–0
11	2012	Kyrgyzstan	5–2
12	2006	Tajikistan	4–1
13–19		6 Times	3–0
20–24		5 Times	3–1

=== Worst ===
As of 7 September 2025

Number	Year	Opponent	Result
1	2021	France	0–8
2	2005	Turkey	0–6
3	2008	Russia	0–6
4	2025	Belgium	0–6
5	2016	Montenegro	0–5
6	2024	Norway	0–5
7	1997	Japan	1–5
8	2008	England	1–5
9	2009	Belarus	1–5
10–21		12 Times	0–4
22	2000	United Arab Emirates	2–5
23	2011	Belgium	1–4
24	2013	Germany	1–4
25	2016	Denmark	1–4
26	2025	Belarus	1–4
27–47		21 Times	0–3
48	2014	Czech Republic	2–4
49–61		13 Times	1–3

== International matches ==
=== 1992–1999 ===
Type	GP	W	D	L	GF	GA
Friendly Matches	8	1	3	4	2	9
1996 AFC ACQ	4	1	0	3	1	6
1998 FIFA World Cup qualification	12	5	3	4	22	21
1998 Asian Games	5	2	1	2	8	6
Other tournaments	7	4	3	0	8	3
Total	36	13	10	13	41	45

==== 1992 ====
1 June 1992 Central Asian Cup	Kazakhstan	1–0	Turkmenistan	Almaty, Kazakhstan
	Niederhaus 85'	Summary		Stadium: Central Stadium; Attendance: 2,500; Referee: Binaretdin Sultanbayev (Kyrgyzstan)

3 July 1992 Pyongyang Tournament	Libya	0–1	Kazakhstan	Pyongyang, North Korea
		Summary	Bayseitov 78'	Stadium: Rungrado 1st of May Stadium; Attendance: 1,000; Referee: Kim Yong-chol (North Korea)

16 July 1992 Central Asian Cup	Kazakhstan	1–0	Uzbekistan	Almaty, Kazakhstan
	Duzmambetov 25'	Summary		Stadium: Central Stadium; Attendance: 1,000; Referee: Valeriy Urunov (Tajikistan)

14 September 1992 Central Asian Cup	Turkmenistan	1–1	Kazakhstan	Ashgabat, Turkmenistan
	Zolotukhin 4'	Summary	Abildaev 57'	Stadium: Köpetdag Stadium; Attendance: 5,000; Referee: Binaretdin Sultanbayev (Kyrgyzstan)

26 September 1992 Central Asian Cup	Kyrgyzstan	1–1	Kazakhstan	Bishkek, Kyrgyzstan
	Bondarenko 75'	Summary	Aubakirov 60'	Stadium: Spartak Stadium; Attendance: 2,000; Referee: Aleksandr Blinkov (Uzbekistan)

14 October 1992 Central Asian Cup	Uzbekistan	1–1	Kazakhstan	Tashkent, Uzbekistan
	Abduraimov 27' (pen.)	Summary	Duzmambetov 16'	Stadium: Pakhtakor Stadium; Attendance: 35,000; Referee: Abdulgani Radzhapov (Kyrgyzstan)

25 October 1992 Central Asian Cup	Kazakhstan	2–0	Kyrgyzstan	Almaty, Kazakhstan
	Kurganskiy 34', 35'	Summary		Stadium: Central Stadium; Attendance: 2,000; Referee: Konstantin Partsalis (Turkmenistan)

==== 1994 ====
11 April 1994 Friendly	Tajikistan	0–1	Kazakhstan	Tashkent, Uzbekistan
KZT (UTC+6)		Summary	Kapustnikov 47'	Stadium: MHSK Stadium; Attendance: 9,000; Referee: Sardar Nadzhafaliev (Uzbekistan)

13 April 1994 Friendly	Uzbekistan	1–0	Kazakhstan	Tashkent, Uzbekistan
KZT (UTC+6)	Aleksandr Tikhonov 77' (pen.)	Summary		Stadium: Central Stadium Pakhtakor; Attendance: 45,000; Referee: Abduraim Babaev (Tajikistan)

15 April 1994 Friendly	Kazakhstan	0–0	Turkmenistan	Tashkent, Uzbekistan
KZT (UTC+6)		Summary		Stadium: Central Stadium Pakhtakor; Attendance: 10,000; Referee: Zokir Abdullayev (Uzbekistan)

17 April 1994 Friendly	Kazakhstan	0–0	Kyrgyzstan	Tashkent, Uzbekistan
KZT (UTC+6)		Summary	Ishenbaev (red card) 67'	Stadium: MHSK Stadium; Attendance: 2,700; Referee: Babur Haydarov (Uzbekistan)

==== 1995 ====
27 December 1995 Friendly	Kuwait	0–0	Kazakhstan	Kuwait City, Kuwait
KZT (UTC+6)		Summary		Stadium: Al Kuwait Sports Club Stadium; Attendance: 1,000; Referee: Rahdi Al Haddad (Kuwait)

29 December 1995 Friendly	Saudi Arabia	3–0	Kazakhstan	Jeddah, Saudi Arabia
KZT (UTC+6)	Al-Thunayan 57', 73'; Amin 64'	Summary		Stadium: Prince Abdullah Al Faisal Stadium; Attendance: 8,500; Referee: Hasan Al Beheiry (Saudi Arabia)

==== 1996 ====
3 January 1996 Friendly	Lebanon	2–1	Kazakhstan	Beirut, Lebanon
KZT (UTC+6)	Ayoub 31' (pen.); Allouche 34'	Summary	Imankulov 12'	Stadium: Beirut Municipal Stadium; Attendance: 5,000; Referee: Ammar Ammar (Lebanon)

14 June 1996 1996 AFC ACQ	Kazakhstan	1–0	Qatar	Almaty, Kazakhstan
KZT (UTC+6)	Nizovtsev 7'	Summary		Stadium: Central Stadium; Attendance: 6,000; Referee: Pirom Un-Prasert (Thailand)

21 June 1996 1996 AFC ACQ	Syria	2–0	Kazakhstan	Damascus, Syria
KZT (UTC+6)	Taleb 21'; Sheikh-Dib 34'	Summary		Stadium: Abbasiyyin Stadium; Attendance: 20,000; Referee: Fahed Al-Damisi (Jordan)

5 July 1996 1996 AFC ACQ	Qatar	3–0	Kazakhstan	Doha, Qatar
KZT (UTC+6)	Al-Obaidly 5'; Soufi 21'; Al-Enazi 43'	Summary		Stadium: Khalifa Stadium; Attendance: 12,000; Referee: Omer Al-Mehannah (Saudi Arabia)

12 July 1996 1996 AFC ACQ	Kazakhstan	0–1	Syria	Almaty, Kazakhstan
KZT (UTC+6)		Summary	Al Boushi 9'	Stadium: Central Stadium; Attendance: 5,000; Referee: Nik Ahmad Yaakub (Malaysia)

==== 1997 ====
11 May 1997 1998 WCQ 1R	Kazakhstan	3–0	Pakistan	Almaty, Kazakhstan
KZT (UTC+6)	Esmagambetov 2', 62'; Yablochkin 49'	Summary		Stadium: Central Stadium; Attendance: 12,000; Referee: Allabergen Sapaev (Turkmenistan)

6 June 1997 1998 WCQ 1R	Iraq	1–2	Kazakhstan	Baghdad, Iraq
KZT (UTC+6)	Abdul Ridha 2'	Summary	Klishin 41'; Loginov 48'	Stadium: Al-Shaab Stadium; Attendance: 20,000; Referee: Wei Jihong (China)

11 June 1997 1998 WCQ 1R	Pakistan	0–7	Kazakhstan	Lahore, Pakistan
KZT (UTC+6)		Summary	Esmagambetov 28'; Klishin 32'; Loginov 36'; Mazbaev 53'; Zubarev 64', 68', 72'	Stadium: Railway Stadium; Attendance: 3,500; Referee: Abbas Al Dashti Essa (Kuwait)

29 June 1997 1998 WCQ 1R	Kazakhstan	3–1	Iraq	Almaty, Kazakhstan
KZT (UTC+6)	Mazbaev 4'; Loginov 26'; Abdul Ridha 56' (o.g.)	Summary	Abdul-Ridha 60'	Stadium: Central Stadium; Attendance: 12,000; Referee: Jindamai Russamee (Thailand)

2 September 1997 Friendly	China	3–0	Kazakhstan	Dalian, China
KZT (UTC+6)	Fan Zhiyi 17'; Li Jinyu 22'; Li Bing 40'	Summary		Stadium: Dalian People's Stadium; Attendance: 14,000; Referee: Wei Lee (China PR)

6 September 1997 1998 WCQ 2R	South Korea	3–0	Kazakhstan	Seoul, South Korea
19:00 (UTC+9)	Choi Yong-Soo 24', 67', 74'	Summary		Stadium: Seoul Olympic Stadium; Attendance: 41,219; Referee: Santhan Nagalingam (Singapore)

12 September 1997 1998 WCQ 2R	United Arab Emirates	4–0	Kazakhstan	Abu Dhabi, United Arab Emirates
KZT (UTC+6)	Ali 20'; Obaid 48'; Zuhair Bakheet 75'; Mubarak 85'	Summary		Stadium: Zayed Sports City Stadium; Attendance: 15,000; Referee: Pirom Un-Prasert (Thailand)

20 September 1997 1998 WCQ 2R	Kazakhstan	1–1	Uzbekistan	Almaty, Kazakhstan
KZT (UTC+6)	Baltiev 84'	Summary	Shatskikh 85'	Stadium: Central Stadium; Attendance: 12,000; Referee: Ahmad Nabil Ayad (Lebanon)

4 October 1997 1998 WCQ 2R	Kazakhstan	1–1	Japan	Almaty, Kazakhstan
17:00 KZT (UTC+6)	Zubarev 90+2'	Summary	Akita 23'	Stadium: Central Stadium; Attendance: 10,000; Referee: Taj Addin Fares (Syria)

11 October 1997 1998 WCQ 2R	Kazakhstan	1–1	South Korea	Almaty, Kazakhstan
17:00 KZT (UTC+6)	Yevteyev 50'	Summary	Choi Yong-Soo 5'	Stadium: Central Stadium; Attendance: 15,000; Referee: Omar Abu Loom (Jordan)

18 October 1997 1998 WCQ 2R	Kazakhstan	3–0	United Arab Emirates	Almaty, Kazakhstan
KZT (UTC+6)	Sparyshev 55'; Yevteyev 64'; Yurist 75'	Summary		Stadium: Central Stadium; Attendance: 18,000; Referee: Nik Ahmad Haji Yaakub (Malaysia)

25 October 1997 1998 WCQ 2R	Uzbekistan	4–0	Kazakhstan	Tashkent, Uzbekistan
KZT (UTC+6)	Shkvirin 19', 33'; Fedorov 44'; Kasimov 71'	Summary		Stadium: Pakhtakor Markaziy Stadium; Attendance: 25,000; Referee: Hassan Al Ajmi (Oman)

8 November 1997 1998 WCQ 2R	Japan	5–1	Kazakhstan	Tokyo, Japan
19:00 (UTC+9)	Akita 11'; Nakata 15'; Nakayama 44'; Ihara 66'; Takagi 88'	Summary	Yevteyev 73'	Stadium: Tokyo Olympic Stadium; Attendance: 56,032; Referee: Mario van der Ende (Netherlands)

==== 1998 ====
1 December 1998 1998 Asian Games 1R	Kazakhstan	0–2	Iran	Sisaket, Thailand
15:30 (UTC+7)		Summary	Hashemian 1', 50'	Stadium: Sri Nakhon Lamduan Stadium; Attendance: 10,086; Referee: Hani Bilal (Qatar)

3 December 1998 1998 Asian Games 1R	Laos	0–5	Kazakhstan	Sisaket, Thailand
15:30 (UTC+7)		Summary	Zubarev 14', 50', 68', 90'; Makayev 32'	Stadium: Sri Nakhon Lamduan Stadium

8 December 1998 1998 Asian Games 2R	Thailand	1–1	Kazakhstan	Bangkok, Thailand
17:00 (UTC+7)	Chalermsan 50' (pen.)	Summary	Zubarev 66'	Stadium: Rajamangala Stadium; Attendance: 60,000

10 December 1998 1998 Asian Games 2R	Qatar	0–2	Kazakhstan	Bangkok, Thailand
15:00 (UTC+7)		Summary	Zubarev 13'; Mirzabaev 90'	Stadium: Rajamangala Stadium; Attendance: 40,000

12 December 1998 1998 Asian Games 2R	Kazakhstan	0–3	Lebanon	Bangkok, Thailand
15:00 (UTC+7)		Summary	Al Indari 13', 50'; Al-Jurdi 77'	Stadium: Rajamangala Stadium; Attendance: 60,000

=== 2000–2009 ===
Type	GP	W	D	L	GF	GA
Friendly Matches and Tournaments	36	5	12	19	35	59
2000 AFC Asian Cup qualification	4	3	0	1	8	3
2000 West Asian Football Federation Championship	3	1	0	2	3	9
2002 FIFA World Cup qualification	6	4	2	0	20	2
2006 FIFA World Cup qualification	12	0	1	11	6	29
UEFA Euro 2008 qualifying	14	2	4	8	11	21
2010 FIFA World Cup qualification	10	2	0	8	11	29
Total	85	17	19	49	94	152

==== 2000 ====
20 March 2000 Friendly	Bahrain	0–1	Kazakhstan	Manama, Bahrain
		Summary	Avdeyev	Stadium: Al Ahli Stadium

31 March 2000 2000 Asian Cup Q	Jordan	0–1	Kazakhstan	Doha, Qatar
		Summary	Avdeyev 10'	Stadium: Al-Sadd Stadium; Attendance: 4,500; Referee: Lu Jun (China)

2 April 2000 2000 Asian Cup Q	Qatar	3–1	Kazakhstan	Doha, Qatar
	Nazmi 36'; Mustafa 39'; Al Enazi 73'	Summary	Avdeyev 82'	Stadium: Al-Sadd Stadium; Attendance: 6,000; Referee: Jalal Moradi (Iran)

6 April 2000 2000 Asian Cup Q	Kazakhstan	2–0	Palestine	Doha, Qatar
	Kadyrkulov 38'; Litvinenko 90'	Summary		Stadium: Al-Sadd Stadium; Attendance: 2,500; Referee: Jalal Moradi (Iran)

8 April 2000 2000 Asian Cup Q	Pakistan	0–4	Kazakhstan	Doha, Qatar
		Summary	Zubarev 21', 43'; Kucheryavykh 60'; Klishin 72'	Stadium: Al-Sadd Stadium; Attendance: 3,000; Referee: Jalal Moradi (Iran)

24 May 2000 2000 WAFF Championship	Iran	3–0	Kazakhstan	Amman, Jordan
17:30 (UTC+3)	Karimi 6' 73'; Hashemian 45'	Summary		Stadium: King Abdullah Stadium; Attendance: 3,500; Referee: Salem Mahmoud (Jordan)

26 May 2000 2000 WAFF Championship	Kazakhstan	0–4	Syria	Amman, Jordan
17:30 (UTC+3)		Summary	Azzam 26'; Al Boushy 56'; Haj Mustafa 57'; Al Beetar 82'	Stadium: King Abdullah Stadium; Attendance: 2,000; Referee: Hazim Hussein Issa (Iraq)

28 May 2000 2000 WAFF Championship	Kazakhstan	3–2	Palestine	Amman, Jordan
17:30 (UTC+3)	Kadyrkulov 29', 88'; Bogatyrev 43'	Summary	Lafi 55'; Al-Faran 83'	Stadium: King Abdullah Stadium; Attendance: 3,000; Referee: Salem Mujghef (Jordan)

7 October 2000 Friendly	Kazakhstan	0–1	Saudi Arabia	Amman, Jordan
		Summary	Al-Meshal 49'	Stadium: Amman International Stadium; Attendance: 3,000; Referee: Salem Mujghef (Jordan)

11 December 2000 Friendly	United Arab Emirates	5–2	Kazakhstan	Abu Dhabi, United Arab Emirates
	Kazem Ali 28', 58'; Mohammed Ibrahim 54'; Yaser Salem 60', 87'	Summary	Baltiev 11', 76' (pen.)	Stadium: Zayed Sports City Stadium

==== 2001 ====
12 April 2001 2002 World Cup Q	Nepal	0–6	Kazakhstan	Baghdad, Iraq
17:00 (UTC+4)		Summary	Litvinenko 11', 28'; Urazbakhtin 21'; Lunyov 73'; Baltiev 75'; Kadyrkulov 82' (pen.)	Stadium: Al-Shaab Stadium; Attendance: 45,000; Referee: Mohammed Kousa (Syria)

14 April 2001 2002 World Cup Q	Macau	0–3	Kazakhstan	Baghdad, Iraq
17:00 (UTC+4)		Summary	Avdeyev 11'; Litvinenko 57'; Gorovenka 68'	Stadium: Al-Shaab Stadium; Attendance: 15,000; Referee: Kim Tae-Young (South Korea)

16 April 2001 2002 World Cup Q	Iraq	1–1	Kazakhstan	Baghdad, Iraq
19:15 (UTC+4)	Al-Hail 31' (pen.)	Summary	Baltiev 6'	Stadium: Al-Shaab Stadium; Attendance: 50,000; Referee: Kim Tae-Young (South Korea)

21 April 2001 2002 World Cup Q	Kazakhstan	4–0	Nepal	Almaty, Kazakhstan
16:00 KZT (UTC+7)	Shevchenko 43', 73'; Baltiev 69' (pen.); Gorovenka 87'	Summary		Stadium: Almaty Central Stadium; Attendance: 15,000; Referee: Abdulla Al Bannai (UAE)

23 April 2001 2002 World Cup Q	Kazakhstan	5–0	Macau	Almaty, Kazakhstan
16:00 KZT (UTC+7)	Byakov 50', 70'; Avdeyev 51', 72'; Gorovenka 83'	Summary		Stadium: Almaty Central Stadium; Attendance: 8,000; Referee: Balu Sundarraj (India)

25 April 2001 2002 World Cup Q	Kazakhstan	1–1	Iraq	Almaty, Kazakhstan
19:00 KZT (UTC+7)	Litvinenko 32'	Summary	Majid 42'	Stadium: Almaty Central Stadium; Attendance: 25,000; Referee: Mongkol Rungklay (Thailand)

14 November 2001 Friendly	Estonia	0–0	Kazakhstan	Tallinn, Estonia
		Summary		Stadium: A. Le Coq Arena; Attendance: 1,500; Referee: Margus Kotter Estonia)

==== 2002 ====
17 April 2002 Friendly	Latvia	2–1	Kazakhstan	Riga, Latvia
17:00 (UTC+3)	Zemļinskis 45'; Štolcers 89'	Summary	Shevchenko 45'	Stadium: Ventspils Olimpiskais Stadions; Attendance: 2,000; Referee: Paulius Malžinskas (Lithuania)

7 July 2002 Friendly	Kazakhstan	1–1	Estonia	Almaty, Kazakhstan
	Litvinenko 38'	Summary	Rooba 42'	Stadium: Central Stadium; Attendance: 15,000; Referee: Sergey Kapanin (Kazakhstan)

==== 2003 ====
12 February 2003 Friendly	Malta	2–2	Kazakhstan	Attard, Malta
18:15 (UTC+1)	Bogdanović 15'; Nwoko 61'	Summary	Shevchenko 72'; Tarasov 82'	Stadium: Ta' Qali National Stadium; Attendance: 200; Referee: René Rogalla (Switzerland)

27 April 2003 Friendly	Faroe Islands	3–2	Kazakhstan	Toftir, Faroe Islands
	á Borg 16' (pen.); Petersen 45' á Lakjuni 49'	Summary	Lunyov 56'; Mukanov 76'	Stadium: Svangaskarð; Attendance: 420; Referee: Kristinn Jakobsson (Iceland)

29 April 2003 Friendly	Faroe Islands	2–1	Kazakhstan	Tórshavn, Faroe Islands
	av Fløtum 65'; Johnsson 75'	Summary	Lovchev 6' (pen.)	Stadium: Tórsvøllur; Attendance: 800; Referee: Bragi Bergmann (Iceland)

6 June 2003 Friendly	Poland	3–0	Kazakhstan	Poznań, Poland
20:15 (UTC+2)	Wichniarek 2'; Dawidowski 51'; Krzynówek 82' (pen.)	Summary		Stadium: Stadion Miejski; Attendance: 6,000; Referee: Knud Erik Fisker (Denmark)

20 August 2003 Friendly	Portugal	1–0	Kazakhstan	Chaves, Portugal
21:15 (UTC+1)	Simão 65'	Summary		Stadium: Estádio Municipal de Chaves; Attendance: 8,000; Referee: Julián Rodríguez Santiago (Spain)

==== 2004 ====
18 February 2004 2004 Cyprus Tournament	Latvia	3–1	Kazakhstan	Larnaca, Cyprus
15:00 (UTC+2)	Pahars 40'; Laizāns 45', 56'	Report	Aksenov 23'	Stadium: Antonis Papadopoulos Stadium; Attendance: 152; Referee: Kostas Konstantinou (Cyprus)

19 February 2004 2004 Cyprus Tournament	Kazakhstan	3–3 (a.e.t.) (3–2 p)	Armenia	Paphos, Cyprus
15:00 (UTC+2)	Zhumaskaliyev 53', 75'; Finonchenko 76'	Report	Petrosyan 52'; Art.Karamyan 72'; Arm.Karamyan 82'	Stadium: Pafiako Stadium; Attendance: 100; Referee: Panayiotis Gerasimou (Cyprus)

21 February 2004 2004 Cyprus Tournament	Cyprus	2–1	Kazakhstan	Larnaca, Cyprus
15:00 (UTC+2)	Charalampidis 2'; Michael 9'	Report	Uzdenov 70'	Stadium: Tsirion Stadium; Attendance: 300; Referee: Romāns Lajuks (Latvia)

28 April 2004 Friendly	Kazakhstan	2–3	Azerbaijan	Almaty, Kazakhstan
21:30 KZT (UTC+7)	Karpovich 56'; Lunyov 80'	(Report)	33' Nabiev; 60' Quliyev; 85' R.F. Sadygov	Stadium: Central Stadium; Attendance: 18,000; Referee: Kadyrbek Chynybekov (Kyrgyzstan)

8 August 2004 2006 World Cup Q	Kazakhstan	1–2	Ukraine	Almaty, Kazakhstan
21:00 KZT (UTC+7)	Karpovich 34'	Summary	Byelik 14'; Rotan 90'	Stadium: Almaty Central Stadium; Attendance: 23,000; Referee: Pedro Proença (Portugal)

9 October 2004 2006 World Cup Q	Turkey	4–0	Kazakhstan	Istanbul, Turkey
20:00 (UTC+3)	Gökdeniz 17'; Nihat 50'; Tekke 90', 90+3'	Summary		Stadium: Şükrü Saracoğlu Stadium; Attendance: 39,900; Referee: Vladimír Hriňák (Slovakia)

13 October 2004 2006 World Cup Q	Kazakhstan	0–1	Albania	Almaty, Kazakhstan
20:00 KZT (UTC+7)		Summary	Bushi 61'	Stadium: Almaty Central Stadium; Attendance: 12,300; Referee: Fritz Stuchlik (Austria)

17 November 2004 2006 World Cup Q	Greece	3–1	Kazakhstan	Piraeus, Greece
21:30 KZT (UTC+2)	Charisteas 24', 46'; Katsouranis 85'	Summary	Baltiev 88'	Stadium: Karaiskakis Stadium; Attendance: 31,838; Referee: Kostadin Kostadinov (Bulgaria)

==== 2005 ====
29 January 2005 Friendly	Japan	4–0	Kazakhstan	Yokohama, Japan
19:20] (UTC+9)	Tamada 5', 60'; Matsuda 11'; Alex Santos 24'	Summary		Stadium: International Stadium Yokohama; Attendance: 46,941; Referee: Sang Gu Park (South Korea)

26 March 2005 2006 World Cup Q	Denmark	3–0	Kazakhstan	Copenhagen, Denmark
20:00 (UTC+1)	Møller 10', 48'; C. Poulsen 33'	Summary		Stadium: Parken Stadium; Attendance: 20,980; Referee: Grzegorz Gilewski (Poland)

4 June 2005 2006 World Cup Q	Ukraine	2–0	Kazakhstan	Kyiv, Ukraine
19:15 KZT (UTC+3)	Shevchenko 18'; Avdeev 83' (o.g.)	Summary		Stadium: Olimpiysky National Sports Complex; Attendance: 45,000; Referee: Gerald Lehner (Austria)

8 June 2005 2006 World Cup Q	Kazakhstan	0–6	Turkey	Almaty, Kazakhstan
21:00 KZT (UTC+6)		Summary	Tekke 13', 85'; Toraman 15'; Tuncay 41', 90'; Halil Altıntop 88'	Stadium: Almaty Central Stadium; Attendance: 20,000; Referee: Viktor Kassai (Hungary)

17 August 2005 2006 World Cup Q	Kazakhstan	1–2	Georgia	Almaty, Kazakhstan
18:00 KZT (UTC+6)	Kenzhekhanov 23'	Summary	Demetradze 50', 82'	Stadium: Almaty Central Stadium; Attendance: 9,000; Referee: Richard Havrilla (Slovakia)

3 August 2005 2006 World Cup Q	Albania	2–1	Kazakhstan	Tirana, Albania
20:00 (UTC+1)	Myrtaj 53'; Bogdani 56'	Summary	Nizovtsev 62'	Stadium: Qemal Stafa; Attendance: 3,000; Referee: Krzysztof Słupik (Poland)

7 August 2005 2006 World Cup Q	Kazakhstan	1–2	Greece	Almaty, Kazakhstan
19:00 KZT (UTC+6)	Zhalmagambetov 53'	Summary	Giannakopoulos 78'; Liberopoulos 90+4'	Stadium: Almaty Central Stadium; Attendance: 18,000; Referee: Alexandru Tudor (Romania)

8 October 2005 2006 World Cup Q	Georgia	0–0	Kazakhstan	Tbilisi, Georgia
20:00 (UTC+4)		Summary		Stadium: Boris Paichadze Stadium; Attendance: 0 Referee: Jouni Hyytiä (Finland)

12 October 2005 2006 World Cup Q	Kazakhstan	1–2	Denmark	Almaty, Kazakhstan
22:00 KZT (UTC+6)	Kuchma 86'	Summary	Gravgaard 46'; Tomasson 49'	Stadium: Almaty Central Stadium; Attendance: 8,050; Referee: Edo Trivković (Croatia)

==== 2006 ====
14 February 2006 Friendly	Jordan	2–0	Kazakhstan	Amman, Jordan
	Ra'fat Ali 13'; Aqel 53'	Summary		Stadium: Amman International Stadium

24 February 2006 Friendly	North Korea	0–0	Kazakhstan	Larnaca, Cyprus
		Summary		Stadium: GSZ Stadium; Attendance: 120

28 February 2006 2006 Cyprus Tournament	Finland	0–0 (a.e.t.) (1–3 p)	Kazakhstan	Larnaca, Cyprus
17:00 (UTC+2)		Summary		Stadium: GSZ Stadium; Attendance: 100; Referee: Leontios Trattos (Cyprus)

1 March 2006 2006 Cyprus Tournament	Greece	2–0	Kazakhstan	Nicosia, Cyprus
19:00 (UTC+2)	Samaras 68'; Giannakopoulos 90+1'	Summary		Stadium: GSP Stadium; Attendance: 2,000; Referee: Panikos Kailis (Cyprus)

2 July 2006 Friendly	Kazakhstan	4–1	Tajikistan	Almaty, Kazakhstan
	Zhumaskaliyev 22'; Familtsev 40'; Kuchma 63'; Tleshev 90'	Summary	Saidov 75'	Stadium: Almaty Central Stadium; Attendance: 2,200; Referee: Kadyrbek Chynybekov (Kyrgyzstan)

5 July 2006 Friendly	Kazakhstan	1–0	Kyrgyzstan	Almaty, Kazakhstan
	Baltiev 20' (pen.)	Summary		Stadium: Almaty Central Stadium; Attendance: 1,800; Referee: Nail Lutfullin (Uzbekistan)

16 August 2006 EURO 2008 Q	Belgium	0–0	Kazakhstan	Brussels, Belgium
20:45 (UTC+2)		Report		Stadium: Constant Vanden Stock; Attendance: 15,495; Referee: Mark Courtney (Northern Ireland)

6 September 2006 EURO 2008 Q	Azerbaijan	1–1	Kazakhstan	Baku, Azerbaijan
19:00 UTC+5	Ladaga 16'	Report	Byakov 36'	Stadium: Tofiq Bahramov Republican Stadium; Attendance: 8,500; Referee: Zsolt Szabo (Hungary)

7 October 2006 EURO 2008 Q	Kazakhstan	0–1	Poland	Almaty, Kazakhstan
21:00 KZT (UTC+6)		Report	Smolarek 52'	Stadium: Almaty Central Stadium; Attendance: 22,000; Referee: Edo Trivkovic (Croatia)

11 October 2006 EURO 2008 Q	Kazakhstan	0–2	Finland	Almaty, Kazakhstan
22:00 KZT (UTC+6)		Report	Litmanen 29'; Hyypiä 64'	Stadium: Almaty Central Stadium; Attendance: 17,863; Referee: Athanassios Briakos (Greece)

15 November 2006 EURO 2008 Q	Portugal	3–0	Kazakhstan	Coimbra, Portugal
21:00 (UTC+0)	Simão 8', 86'; Ronaldo 30'	Report		Stadium: Estádio Cidade de Coimbra; Attendance: 27,000; Referee: René Rogalla (Switzerland)

24 December 2006 2006 King's Cup	Singapore	0–0	Kazakhstan	Bangkok, Thailand
17:00 (UTC+7)		Summary		Stadium: Suphachalasai Stadium

26 December 2006 2006 King's Cup	Vietnam	2–1	Kazakhstan	Bangkok, Thailand
16:30 (UTC+7)	Le Hong Minh 21'; Le Cong Vinh 90'	Summary	Finonchenko 57'	Stadium: Suphachalasai Stadium

28 December 2006 2006 King's Cup	Thailand	2–2	Kazakhstan	Bangkok, Thailand
18:45 (UTC+7)	Nuchnum 41'; Thonkanya 58'	Summary	Rodionov 66'; Ashirbekov 77'	Stadium: Suphachalasai Stadium

==== 2007 ====
7 February 2007 Friendly	China	2–1	Kazakhstan	Guangzhou, China
16:00 (UTC+8)	Han Peng 30' (pen.); Li Jinyu 48'	Summary	Suyumagambetov 16'	Stadium: Tianhe Stadium

7 March 2007 Alma TV Cup	Kazakhstan	2–0	Kyrgyzstan	Shymkent, Kazakhstan
16:00 KZT (UTC+6)	Byakov 3'; Chichulin 68'	Summary		Stadium: Kazhimukan Munaitpasov; Attendance: 4,200; Referee: Irmatov (Uzbekistan)

9 March 2007 Alma TV Cup	Kazakhstan	1–0	Azerbaijan	Shymkent, Kazakhstan
16:00 KZT (UTC+6)	Finonchenko 81'	(Report)		Stadium: Kazhimukan Munaitpasov; Attendance: 4,500; Referee: Dmitriy Mashentsev (Kyrgyzstan)

11 March 2007 Alma TV Cup	Kazakhstan	1–1	Uzbekistan	Almaty, Kazakhstan
16:00 KZT (UTC+6)	Suyumagambetov 13'	Summary	Geynrikh 34'	Stadium: Central Stadium; Attendance: 4,500; Referee: Mashentsev (Kyrgyzstan)

24 March 2007 EURO 2008 Q	Kazakhstan	2–1	Serbia	Almaty, Kazakhstan
19:00 KZT (UTC+6)	Ashirbekov 47'; Zhumaskaliyev 61'	Report	Žigić 68'	Stadium: Almaty Central Stadium; Attendance: 19,600; Referee: Vladimir Hriňák (Slovakia)

2 June 2007 EURO 2008 Q	Kazakhstan	1–2	Armenia	Almaty, Kazakhstan
18:00 KZT (UTC+6)	Baltiev 88' (pen.)	Report	Arzumanyan 31'; Hovsepian 39' (pen.)	Stadium: Almaty Central Stadium; Attendance: 17,100; Referee: Pavel Královec (Czech Republic)

6 June 2007 EURO 2008 Q	Kazakhstan	1–1	Azerbaijan	Almaty, Kazakhstan
19:00 UTC+6	Baltiev 53'	Report	Nadirov 30'	Stadium: Almaty Central Stadium; Attendance: 11,800; Referee: Albert Toussaint (Luxembourg)

22 August 2007 EURO 2008 Q	Finland	2–1	Kazakhstan	Tampere, Finland
19:00 (UTC+2)	A. Eremenko 13'; Tainio 61'	Report	Byakov 23'	Stadium: Ratina Stadion; Attendance: 13,000; Referee: Viktor Kassai (Hungary)

8 September 2007 Friendly	Kazakhstan	1–1	Tajikistan	Almaty, Kazakhstan
18:00 KZT (UTC+6)	Nurdauletov 54'	Summary	Saidov 42'	Stadium: Almaty Central Stadium; Attendance: 10,000; Referee: Emil Busurmankulov (Kyrgyzstan)

12 September 2007 EURO 2008 Q	Kazakhstan	2–2	Belgium	Almaty, Kazakhstan
21:00 KZT (UTC+6)	Byakov 39'; Smakov 77' (pen.)	Report	Geraerts 13'; Mirallas 24'	Stadium: Almaty Central Stadium; Attendance: 18,100; Referee: Alexandru Tudor (Romania)

13 October 2007 EURO 2008 Q	Poland	3–1	Kazakhstan	Warsaw, Poland
20:30 (UTC+2)	Smolarek 56', 64', 65'	Report	Byakov 20'	Stadium: Stadion Wojska Polskiego; Attendance: 11,040; Referee: Espen Berntsen (Norway)

17 October 2007 EURO 2008 Q	Kazakhstan	1–2	Portugal	Almaty, Kazakhstan
20:00 KZT (UTC+6)	Byakov 90+5'	Report	Makukula 84'; Ronaldo 90+1'	Stadium: Almaty Central Stadium; Attendance: 25,057; Referee: Jan Wegereef (Netherlands)

21 November 2007 EURO 2008 Q	Armenia	0–1	Kazakhstan	Yerevan, Armenia
19:00 (UTC+4)		Report	Ostapenko 64'	Stadium: Vazgen Sargsyan Republican Stadium; Attendance: 3,100; Referee: Bruno Faye (France)

24 November 2007 EURO 2008 Q	Serbia	1–0	Kazakhstan	Belgrade, Serbia
18:00 (UTC+1)	Ostapenko 79' (o.g.)	Report		Stadium: Stadion Partizana; Attendance: 400; Referee: Kyros Vassaras (Greece)

==== 2008 ====
3 February 2008 Friendly	Azerbaijan	0–0	Kazakhstan	Antalya, Turkey
18:00 (UTC+2)		(Report)		Stadium: World of Wonders Football Centre; Attendance: 1,500; Referee: Mustafa Kâmil Abitoğlu (Turkey)

6 February 2008 Friendly	Moldova	1–0	Kazakhstan	Antalya, Turkey
16:00 (UTC+2)	Bugaiov 10'	Summary		Stadium: Hotel Titanic Futbol Sahasi; Attendance: 300; Referee: Gerald Lehner (Austria)

26 March 2008 Friendly	Armenia	1–0	Kazakhstan	Rotterdam, Netherlands
19:00 (UTC+1)	Manucharyan 62'	Summary		Stadium: Sportpark Pernis; Attendance: 100; Referee: Pieter Vink (Netherlands)

23 May 2008 Friendly	Russia	6–0	Kazakhstan	Moscow, Russia
19:00 (UTC+4)	Pogrebnyak 26' (pen.); Bystrov 45+1'; Zyryanov 59'; Bilyaletdinov 85' (pen.); Torbinskiy 89'; Sychyov 90+2'	Summary		Stadium: Lokomotiv Stadium; Attendance: 9,500; Referee: Oleh Oriekhov (Ukraine)

27 May 2008 Friendly	Montenegro	3–0	Kazakhstan	Podgorica, Montenegro
20:00 (UTC+2)	Đalović 15', 45+2'; Drinčić 21'	Summary		Stadium: Podgorica City Stadium; Attendance: 8,000; Referee: Abby Toussaint (Luxembourg)

20 August 2008 2010 World Cup Q	Kazakhstan	3–0	Andorra	Almaty, Kazakhstan
22:00 KZT (UTC+6)	Ostapenko 14', 30'; Uzdenov 44'	Report		Stadium: Almaty Central Stadium; Attendance: 7,700; Referee: Veaceslav Banari (Moldova)

6 September 2008 2010 World Cup Q	Croatia	3–0	Kazakhstan	Zagreb, Croatia
20:15 (UTC+2)	N. Kovač 13'; Modrić 36'; Petrić 81'	Report		Stadium: Maksimir Stadium; Attendance: 17,424; Referee: Stefan Johannesson (Sweden)

10 September 2008 2010 World Cup Q	Kazakhstan	1–3	Ukraine	Almaty, Kazakhstan
22:00 KZT (UTC+6)	Ostapenko 68'	Report	Nazarenko 45', 80'; Shevchenko 54'	Stadium: Almaty Central Stadium; Attendance: 17,000; Referee: Felix Brych (Germany)

11 October 2008 2010 World Cup Q	England	5–1	Kazakhstan	London, England
17:15 (UTC+1)	Ferdinand 52'; Kuchma 64' (o.g.); Rooney 76', 86'; Defoe 90'	Report	Kukeyev 68'	Stadium: Wembley Stadium; Attendance: 89,107; Referee: Paul Allaerts (Belgium)

==== 2009 ====
11 February 2009 Friendly	Estonia	0–2	Kazakhstan	Antalya, Turkey
19:00 (UTC+2)		Summary	Baltiev 29', 85'	Stadium: Mardan Sports Complex; Attendance: 200; Referee: Hüseyin Göçek (Turkey)

1 April 2009 2010 World Cup Q	Kazakhstan	1–5	Belarus	Almaty, Kazakhstan
20:30 KZT (UTC+6)	Abdulin 10'	Report	A. Hleb 48'; Kalachev 54', 64'; Stasevich 57'; Rodionov 88'	Stadium: Almaty Central Stadium; Attendance: 19,000; Referee: Jiří Jech (Czech Republic)

6 June 2009 2010 World Cup Q	Kazakhstan	0–4	England	Almaty, Kazakhstan
21:00 KZT (UTC+6)		Report	Barry 40'; Heskey 45+1'; Rooney 72'; Lampard 77' (pen.)	Stadium: Almaty Central Stadium; Attendance: 24,000; Referee: Kristinn Jakobsson (Iceland)

10 June 2009 2010 World Cup Q	Ukraine	2–1	Kazakhstan	Kyiv, Ukraine
20:00 (UTC+3)	Nazarenko 33', 47'	Report	Nusserbayev 19'	Stadium: Lobanovsky Dynamo Stadium; Attendance: 11,500; Referee: Bruno Paixão (Portugal)

9 September 2009 2010 World Cup Q	Andorra	1–3	Kazakhstan	Andorra La Vella, Andorra
20:00 KZT (UTC+2)	Sonejee 70'	Report	Khizhnichenko 14', 35'; Baltiev 29'	Stadium: Comunal; Attendance: 510; Referee: Albert Toussaint (Luxembourg)

10 October 2009 2010 World Cup Q	Belarus	4–0	Kazakhstan	Brest, Belarus
18:00 (UTC+3)	Bardachov 23'; Kalachev 69', 90+3'; Kovel 86'	Report		Stadium: Regional Sport Complex Brestskiy; Attendance: 10,000; Referee: Saïd Ennjimi (France)

14 October 2009 2010 World Cup Q	Kazakhstan	1–2	Croatia	Astana, Kazakhstan
21:30 KZT (UTC+6)	Khizhnichenko 26'	Report	Vukojević 10'; Kranjčar 90+3'	Stadium: Astana Arena; Attendance: 10,250; Referee: Claudio Circhetta (Switzerland)

=== 2010–2019 ===
Type	GP	W	D	L	GF	GA
Friendly Matches	26	11	8	7	38	29
UEFA Euro 2012 qualifying	10	1	1	8	6	24
2014 FIFA World Cup qualification	10	1	2	7	6	21
UEFA Euro 2016 qualifying	10	1	2	7	7	18
2018 FIFA World Cup qualification	10	0	3	7	6	26
2018–19 UEFA Nations League D	6	1	3	2	8	7
UEFA Euro 2020 qualifying	10	3	1	6	13	17
Total	82	18	20	44	84	142

==== 2010 ====
3 March 2010 Friendly	Kazakhstan	0–1	Moldova	Antalya, Turkey
19:00 (UTC+2)		Report	Epureanu 64'	Stadium: Antalya Atatürk Stadium; Attendance: 500; Referee: Vladislav Bezborodov (Russia)

11 August 2010 Friendly	Kazakhstan	3–1	Oman	Astana, Kazakhstan
20:00 KZT (UTC+6)	Karpovich 19'; Zhumaskaliyev 42'; Al-Ajmi 59' (o.g.)	Report	Al-Hosni 64'	Stadium: Astana Arena; Attendance: 6,500; Referee: Ravshan Irmatov (Uzbekistan)

3 September 2010 Euro 2012 Q	Kazakhstan	0–3	Turkey	Astana, Kazakhstan
22:00 KZT (UTC+6)		Report	Arda 24'; Hamit (26); Nihat 76'	Stadium: Astana Arena; Attendance: 15,800; Referee: István Vad (Hungary)

7 September 2010 Euro 2012 Q	Austria	2–0	Kazakhstan	Salzburg, Austria
20:30 (UTC+2)	Linz 90+1'; Hoffer 90+2'	Report		Stadium: Red Bull Arena; Attendance: 22,500; Referee: Marijo Strahonja (Croatia)

8 October 2010 Euro 2012 Q	Kazakhstan	0–2	Belgium	Astana, Kazakhstan
22:00 KZT (UTC+6)		Report	Ogunjimi 52', 70'	Stadium: Astana Arena; Attendance: 8,500; Referee: Marcin Borski (Poland)

12 October 2010 Euro 2012 Q	Kazakhstan	0–3	Germany	Astana, Kazakhstan
23:00 KZT (UTC+6)		Report	Klose 48'; Gómez 76'; Podolski 85'	Stadium: Astana Arena; Attendance: 18,000; Referee: Alexandru Dan Tudor (Romania)

==== 2011 ====
9 February 2011 Friendly	Belarus	1–1	Kazakhstan	Antalya, Turkey
17:00 (UTC+2)	Hleb 45+3' (pen.)	Report	Ostapenko 90'	Stadium: Antalya Atatürk Stadium; Attendance: 300; Referee: Viaceslav Banari (Moldova)

26 March 2011 Euro 2012 Q	Germany	4–0	Kazakhstan	Kaiserslautern, Germany
20:00 (UTC+1)	Klose 3', 88'; Müller 25', 43'	Report		Stadium: Fritz-Walter-Stadion; Attendance: 47,849; Referee: Aleksandar Stavrev (Macedonia)

3 June 2011 Euro 2012 Q	Kazakhstan	2–1	Azerbaijan	Astana, Kazakhstan
19:00 KZT (UTC+6)	Gridin 57', 68'	Report	Nadirov 63'	Stadium: Astana Arena; Attendance: 10,000; Referee: Euan Norris (Scotland)

10 August 2011 Friendly	Kazakhstan	1–1	Syria	Astana, Kazakhstan
20:00 KZT (UTC+6)	Kukeyev 70'	Report	Sabagh 63'	Stadium: Astana Arena; Attendance: 13,500; Referee: Igor Egorov (Russia)

2 September 2011 Euro 2012 Q	Turkey	2–1	Kazakhstan	Istanbul, Turkey
20:00 (UTC+3)	Burak 31'; Arda 90+6'	Report	Konysbayev 55'	Stadium: Turk Telekom Arena; Attendance: 47,756; Referee: Clément Turpin (France)

6 September 2011 Euro 2012 Q	Azerbaijan	3–2	Kazakhstan	Baku, Azerbaijan
20:00 (UTC+5)	R. Aliyev 53'; Shukurov 62' (pen.); Javadov 67'	Report	Ostapenko 20'; Yevstigneyev 77'	Stadium: Tofik Bakhramov Stadium; Attendance: 9,112; Referee: Anders Hermansen (Denmark)

7 October 2011 Euro 2012 Q	Belgium	4–1	Kazakhstan	Brussels, Belgium
20:45(UTC+2)	Simons 40' (pen.); Hazard 43'; Kompany 49'; Ogunjimi 84'	Report	Nurdauletov 86' (pen.)	Stadium: King Baudouin Stadium; Attendance: 29,758; Referee: Milorad Mažić (Serbia)

11 October 2011 Euro 2012 Q	Kazakhstan	0–0	Austria	Astana, Kazakhstan
22:00 KZT (UTC+6)		Report		Stadium: Astana Arena; Attendance: 11,000; Referee: Hannes Kaasik (Estonia)

==== 2012 ====
29 February 2012 Friendly	Kazakhstan	0–0	Latvia	Antalya, Turkey
15:30 (UTC+2)		Summary		Stadium: Antalya Atatürk Stadium; Attendance: 100; Referee: Viaceslav Banari (Moldova)

1 June 2012 Friendly	Kazakhstan	5–2	Kyrgyzstan	Almaty, Kazakhstan
19:00 KZT (UTC+6)	Y. Logvinenko 4'; D. Tazhimbetov 13', 32', 90'; K. Nurdauletov 57' (pen.)	Report	A. Baymatov 27'; K. Sharipov 36'	Stadium: Almaty Central Stadium; Attendance: 14,000; Referee: Olim Talibdjanov (Uzbekistan)

5 June 2012 Friendly	Armenia	3–0	Kazakhstan	Yerevan, Armenia
20:00 (UTC+4)	Ghazaryan 9', 39'; Movsisyan 43'	Summary		Stadium: Republican Stadium; Attendance: 7,500; Referee: Levan Kvaratskhelia (Georgia)

7 September 2012 2014 WCQ	Kazakhstan	1–2	Republic of Ireland	Astana, Kazakhstan
22:00 KZT (UTC+6)	Nurdauletov 37'	Report	Keane 88' (pen.); Doyle 90'	Stadium: Astana Arena; Attendance: 12,384; Referee: Ionut Avram (Romania)

11 September 2012 2014 WCQ	Sweden	2–0	Kazakhstan	Malmö, Sweden
19:30 (UTC+1)	R. Elm 37'; Berg 90+4'	Report		Stadium: Swedbank Stadion; Attendance: 20,414; Referee: Serhiy Boiko (Ukraine)

12 October 2012 2014 WCQ	Kazakhstan	0–0	Austria	Astana, Kazakhstan
22:00 KZT (UTC+6)		Report		Stadium: Astana Arena; Attendance: 12,900; Referee: Tamás Bognár (Hungary)

16 October 2012 2014 WCQ	Austria	4–0	Kazakhstan	Vienna, Austria
20:35 (UTC+2)	Janko 24', 63'; Alaba 71'; Harnik 90+3'	Report		Stadium: Ernst-Happel-Stadion; Attendance: 43,000; Referee: Jakob Kehlet (Denmark)

==== 2013 ====
6 February 2013 Friendly	Kazakhstan	3–1	Moldova	Antalya, Turkey
17:00 (UTC+2)	Dmitrenko 33'; Dzholchiev 59', 90'	Report	Doroș 86'	Stadium: Mardan Sports Complex; Attendance: 100; Referee: Hüseyin Göçek (Turkey)

23 March 2013 2014 WCQ	Kazakhstan	0–3	Germany	Astana, Kazakhstan
00:00 KZT (UTC+6)		Report	Müller 20', 73'; Götze 22'	Stadium: Astana Arena; Attendance: 29,300; Referee: Anastassios Kakos (Greece)

26 March 2013 2014 WCQ	Germany	4–1	Kazakhstan	Nuremberg, Germany
20:45 (UTC+1)	Reus 23', 90'; Götze 27'; Gündoğan 31'	Report	Schmidtgal 46'	Stadium: Frankenstadion; Attendance: 43,520; Referee: Halis Özkahya (Turkey)

4 June 2013 Friendly	Kazakhstan	1–2	Bulgaria	Almaty, Kazakhstan
20:00 KZT (UTC+6)	Shomko 89'	Report	Iliev 60'; Ivanov 60'	Stadium: Almaty Central Stadium; Attendance: 15,200; Referee: Aliyar Ağayev (Azerbaijan)

14 August 2013 Friendly	Kazakhstan	1–0	Georgia	Astana, Kazakhstan
20:00 KZT (UTC+6)	Khizhnichenko 17'	Report		Stadium: Astana Arena; Attendance: 13,500; Referee: Sergey Tsinkevich (Belarus)

6 September 2013 2014 WCQ	Kazakhstan	2–1	Faroe Islands	Astana, Kazakhstan
21:00 KZT (UTC+6)	Nurdauletov 49' (pen.); Finonchenko 63'	Report	Benjaminsen 23'	Stadium: Astana Arena; Attendance: 9,000; Referee: Johnny Casanova (San Marino)

10 September 2013 2014 WCQ	Kazakhstan	0–1	Sweden	Astana, Kazakhstan
22:00 KZT (UTC+6)		Report	Ibrahimović 1'	Stadium: Astana Arena; Attendance: 24,000; Referee: Miroslav Zelinka (Czech Republic)

11 October 2013 2014 WCQ	Faroe Islands	1–1	Kazakhstan	Tórshavn, Faroe Islands
18:00 (UTC+1)	Hansson 41'	Report	Finonchenko 55'	Stadium: Tórsvøllur; Attendance: 1,870; Referee: Dumitru Muntean (Moldova)

15 October 2013 2014 WCQ	Republic of Ireland	3–1	Kazakhstan	Dublin, Republic of Ireland
19:45 (UTC+1)	Keane 17' (pen.); O'Shea 26'; Shomko 77' (o.g.)	Report	Shomko 13'	Stadium: Aviva Stadium; Attendance: 21,700; Referee: Vadims Direktorenko (Latvia)

==== 2014 ====
5 March 2014 Friendly	Kazakhstan	1–1	Lithuania	Antalya, Turkey
17:00 (UTC+2)	Zhumaskaliyev 68'	Report	Vičius 4'	Stadium: Mardan Sports Complex; Attendance: 200; Referee: Mikhail Vilkov (Russia)

7 June 2014 Friendly	Hungary	3–0	Kazakhstan	Budapest, Hungary
20:30 (UTC+2)	Priskin 26'; R. Varga 63'; Engel 90+1' (o.g.)	Report		Stadium: Ferenc Puskás Stadium; Attendance: 10,000; Referee: Alexandre Boucaut (Belgian)

12 August 2014 Friendly	Kazakhstan	2–1	Tajikistan	Almaty, Kazakhstan
19:30 KZT (UTC+6)	Islamkhan 36'; Konysbayev 63'	Report	Tokhirov 57'	Stadium: Central Stadium; Attendance: 7,500; Referee: Dmitriy Mashentsev (Kyrgyzstan)

5 September 2014 Friendly	Kazakhstan	7–1	Kyrgyzstan	Astana, Kazakhstan
19:00 KZT (UTC+6)	Khizhnichenko 27', 42'; Nusserbayev 36'; Islamkhan 55'; Dzholchiev 70'; Konysbayev 82'; Nurgaliev 88'	Report	Zhyrgalbek Uulu 72'	Stadium: Astana Arena; Referee: Sergey Tsinkevich (Belarus)

9 September 2014 Euro 2016 Q	Kazakhstan	0–0	Latvia	Astana, Kazakhstan
22:00 KZT (UTC+6)		Report		Stadium: Astana Arena; Attendance: 10,200; Referee: Ivan Kružliak (Slovakia)

10 October 2014 Euro 2016 Q	Netherlands	3–1	Kazakhstan	Amsterdam, Netherlands
20:45 (UTC+2)	Huntelaar 62'; Afellay 82'; Van Persie 89' (pen.)	Report	Abdulin 17'	Stadium: Amsterdam Arena; Attendance: 47,500; Referee: Matej Jug (Slovenia)

13 October 2014 Euro 2016 Q	Kazakhstan	2–4	Czech Republic	Astana, Kazakhstan
22:00 KZT (UTC+6)	Logvinenko 84', 90+1'	Report	Dočkal 13'; Lafata 44'; Krejčí 56'; Necid 88'	Stadium: Astana Arena; Attendance: 13,752; Referee: Mattias Gestranius (Finland)

16 November 2014 Euro 2016 Q	Turkey	3–1	Kazakhstan	Istanbul, Turkey
21:45 (UTC+2)	Yılmaz 26' (pen.), 29'; Aziz 83'	Report	Smakov 87' (pen.)	Stadium: Türk Telekom Arena; Attendance: 27,547; Referee: Aleksei Eskov (Russia)

==== 2015 ====
18 February 2015 Friendly	Kazakhstan	1–1	Moldova	Aksu, Turkey
18:00 (UTC+2)	Shchetkin 48'	Report	Gaţcan 54'	Stadium: Mardan Sports Complex; Attendance: 100; Referee: Aleksei Nikolaev (Russia)

28 March 2015 Euro 2016 Q	Kazakhstan	0–3	Iceland	Astana, Kazakhstan
21:00 KZT (UTC+6)		Report	Guðjohnsen 20'; B. Bjarnason 32', 90+1'	Stadium: Astana Arena; Attendance: 13,182; Referee: Anastasios Sidiropoulos (Greece)

31 March 2015 Friendly	Russia	0–0	Kazakhstan	Khimki, Russia
20:00 (UTC+3)		Report		Stadium: Arena Khimki; Attendance: 4,000; Referee: Aleksei Kulbakov (Belarus)

12 May 2015 Friendly	Kazakhstan	0–0	Burkina Faso	Almaty, Kazakhstan
18:00 KZT (UTC+6)		Report		Stadium: Ortalıq Stadion; Attendance: 4,000; Referee: Ravshan Irmatov (Uzbekistan)

12 June 2015 Euro 2016 Q	Kazakhstan	0–1	Turkey	Astana, Kazakhstan
22:00 KZT (UTC+6)		Report	Turan 83'	Stadium: Astana Arena; Attendance: 25,125; Referee: Michael Oliver (England)

3 September 2015 Euro 2016 Q	Czech Republic	2–1	Kazakhstan	Plzeň, Czech Republic
20:45 (UTC+2)	Škoda 74', 86'	Report	Logvinenko 21'	Stadium: Doosan Arena; Attendance: 10,572; Referee: Martin Strömbergsson (Sweden)

6 September 2015 Euro 2016 Q	Iceland	0–0	Kazakhstan	Reykjavík, Iceland
18:45 (UTC+0)		Report		Stadium: Laugardalsvöllur; Attendance: 9,767; Referee: Yevhen Aranovsky (Ukraine)

10 October 2015 Euro 2016 Q	Kazakhstan	1–2	Netherlands	Astana, Kazakhstan
22:00 KZT (UTC+6)	Kuat 90+6'		Wijnaldum 33'; Sneijder 50'	Stadium: Astana Arena; Attendance: 20,716; Referee: Clément Turpin (France)

13 October 2015 Euro 2016 Q	Latvia	0–1	Kazakhstan	Riga, Latvia
21:45 (UTC+3)		Report	Kuat 65'	Stadium: Skonto Stadium; Attendance: 7, 027; Referee: Steven McLean (Scotland)

==== 2016 ====
26 March 2016 Friendly	Azerbaijan	0–1	Kazakhstan	Antalya, Turkey
17:00 (UTC+2)		Report	Baizhanov 8'	Stadium: Gloria Sports Arena; Attendance: 78; Referee: Ali Palabıyık (Turkey)

29 March 2016 Friendly	Georgia	1–1	Kazakhstan	Tbilisi, Georgia
21:00 (UTC+4)	Okriashvili 38'	Report	Nurgaliev 35'	Stadium: Boris Paichadze Dinamo Arena; Attendance: 15,000; Referee: Clayton Pisani (Malta)

7 June 2016 Friendly	China	0–1	Kazakhstan	Dalian, China
19:35 (UTC+8)		Report	Nurgaliev 68'	Stadium: Dalian Sports Center Stadium; Attendance: 30,005; Referee: Chris Beath (Australia)

30 August 2016 Friendly	Kyrgyzstan	2–0	Kazakhstan	Bishkek, Kyrgyzstan
20:00 (UTC+6)	Kichin 43'; Murzaev 80'	Summary		Stadium: Spartak Stadium; Attendance: 12,000; Referee: Çarymyrat Kurbanow (Turkmenistan)

4 September 2016 2018 World Cup Q	Kazakhstan	2–2	Poland	Astana, Kazakhstan
22:00 (UTC+6)	Khizhnichenko 51', 58'	Report (FIFA); Report (UEFA)	Kapustka 9'; Lewandowski 35' (pen.)	Stadium: Astana Arena; Attendance: Attendance: 19,905; Referee: Serdar Gözübüyük (Netherlands)

8 October 2016 2018 World Cup Q	Montenegro	5–0	Kazakhstan	Podgorica, Montenegro
18:00 (UTC+2)	Tomašević 24'; Vukčević 59'; Jovetić 64'; Bećiraj 73'; Savić 78'	Report (FIFA); Report (UEFA)		Stadium: Stadion Pod Goricom; Attendance: 8,517; Referee: Robert Schörgenhofer (Austria)

11 October 2016 2018 World Cup Q	Kazakhstan	0–0	Romania	Astana, Kazakhstan
22:00 UTC+6		Report (FIFA); Report (UEFA)		Stadium: Astana Arena; Attendance: 12,346; Referee: Jorge Sousa (Portugal)

11 November 2016 2018 World Cup Q	Denmark	4–1	Kazakhstan	Copenhagen, Denmark
20:45 UTC+1	Cornelius 15'; Eriksen 36' (pen.), 90+2'; Ankersen 78'	Report (FIFA); Report (UEFA)	Suyumbayev 17'	Stadium: Telia Parken; Attendance: 18,901; Referee: Alon Yefet (Israel)

==== 2017 ====
22 March 2017 Friendly	Cyprus	3–1	Kazakhstan	Nicosia, Cyprus
18:00 UTC+2	Mitidis 55'; Katelaris 62'; Christofi 67'	Report	Nusserbayev 29'	Stadium: GSP Stadium; Attendance: 500; Referee: Robert Harvey (Ireland)

26 March 2017 2018 World Cup Q	Armenia	2–0	Kazakhstan	Yerevan, Armenia
20:00 UTC+4	Mkhitaryan 73'; Özbiliz 75'	Report (FIFA); Report (UEFA)		Stadium: Vazgen Sargsyan Republican Stadium; Attendance: 11,500; Referee: Aleksandar Stavrev (Macedonia)

10 June 2017 2018 World Cup Q	Kazakhstan	1–3	Denmark	Almaty, Kazakhstan
22:00 UTC+6	Kuat 76'	Report (FIFA); Report (UEFA)	N. Jørgensen 27'; Eriksen 51' (pen.); Dolberg 81'	Stadium: Almaty Central Stadium; Attendance: 19,065; Referee: Vladislav Bezborodov (Russia)

1 September 2017 2018 World Cup Q	Kazakhstan	0–3	Montenegro	Astana, Kazakhstan
22:00 UTC+6		Report (FIFA); Report (UEFA)	Vešović 31'; Bećiraj 53'; Simić 63'	Stadium: Astana Arena; Attendance: 16,511; Referee: Sébastien Delferière (Belgium)

4 September 2017 2018 World Cup Q	Poland	3–0	Kazakhstan	Warsaw, Poland
20:45 UTC+2	Milik 11'; Glik 74'; Lewandowski 86' (pen.)	Report (FIFA); Report (UEFA)		Stadium: PGE Narodowy; Attendance: 56,963; Referee: Andris Treimanis (Latvia)

5 October 2017 2018 World Cup Q	Romania	3–1	Kazakhstan	București, Romania
21:45 UTC+3	Budescu 33', 38' (pen.); Keșerü 73'	Report (FIFA); Report (UEFA)	Turysbek 82'	Stadium: Arena Naţională; Attendance: 10,123; Referee: Sandro Schärer (Switzerland)

8 October 2017 2018 World Cup Q	Kazakhstan	1–1	Armenia	Astana, Kazakhstan
22:00 UTC+6	Turysbek 64'	Report (FIFA); Report (UEFA)	Mkhitaryan 26'	Stadium: Astana Arena; Attendance: 12,158; Referee: Alexandru Tean (Moldova)

==== 2018 ====
23 March 2018 Friendly	Hungary	2–3	Kazakhstan	Budapest, Hungary
19:00 UTC+1	Szalai 21'; Németh 68'	Report	Murtazayev 6'; Zaynutdinov 10'; Seydakhmet 39'	Stadium: Groupama Arena; Attendance: 9,038; Referee: Tomasz Musiał (Poland)

26 March 2018 Friendly	Bulgaria	2–1	Kazakhstan	Felcsút, Hungary
18:00 UTC+2	I.Popov 23' (pen.); Bodurov 90+3'	Report	Tungyshbayev 55'	Stadium: Pancho Aréna; Attendance: 100; Referee: Tamás Bognár (Hungary)

5 June 2018 Friendly	Kazakhstan	3–0	Azerbaijan	Astana, Kazakhstan
20:00 UTC+6	Murtazayev 13'; Muzhikov 14'; Zaynutdinov 90'	Report		Stadium: Astana Arena; Attendance: 22,500; Referee: Alexandru Tean (Moldova)

6 September 2018 2018–19 Nations League	Kazakhstan	0–2	Georgia	Astana, Kazakhstan
20:00 UTC+6		Report	Chakvetadze 69'; Malyi 74' (o.g.)	Stadium: Astana Arena; Attendance: 28,736; Referee: Halil Umut Meler (Turkey)

10 September 2018 2018–19 Nations League	Andorra	1–1	Kazakhstan	Andorra la Vella, Andorra
20:45 UTC+2	Aláez 86'	Report	Logvinenko 68'	Stadium: Estadi Nacional; Attendance: 1,235; Referee: Vilhjálmur Þórarinsson (Iceland)

13 October 2018 2018–19 Nations League	Latvia	1–1	Kazakhstan	Riga, Latvia
19:00 UTC+3	Karašausks 40'	Report	Zaynutdinov 16'	Stadium: Daugava Stadium; Attendance: 4,878; Referee: Harald Lechner (Austria)

16 October 2018 2018–19 Nations League	Kazakhstan	4–0	Andorra	Astana, Kazakhstan
20:00 UTC+6	Seydakhmet 21'; Turysbek 39'; Gómes 61' (o.g.); Murtazayev 74'	Report		Stadium: Astana Arena; Attendance: 19,854; Referee: Serhiy Boyko (Ukraine)

15 November 2018 2018–19 Nations League	Kazakhstan	1–1	Latvia	Astana, Kazakhstan
21:00 UTC+6	Suyumbayev 37'	Report	Rakels 49'	Stadium: Astana Arena; Attendance: 21,463; Referee: Jens Maae (Denmark)

19 November 2018 2018–19 Nations League	Georgia	2–1	Kazakhstan	Tbilisi, Georgia
21:00 UTC+4	Merebashvili 59'; Chakvetadze 84'	Report	Omirtayev 90'	Stadium: Boris Paichadze Dinamo Arena; Attendance: 52,220; Referee: Tiago Martins (Portugal)

==== 2019 ====
21 February 2019 Friendly	Kazakhstan	1–0	Moldova	Antalya, Turkey
17:00 (UTC+3)	Omirtayev 61'	Report		Stadium: Titanic Deluxe Belek Football Center; Attendance: 500; Referee: Manfredas Lukjančukas (Lithuania)

21 March 2019 Euro 2020 Q	Kazakhstan	3–0	Scotland	Nur-Sultan, Kazakhstan
21:00 UTC+6	Pertsukh 6'; Vorogovskiy 10'; Zaynutdinov 50'	Report		Stadium: Astana Arena; Attendance: 27,641; Referee: Srđan Jovanović (Serbia)

24 March 2019 Euro 2020 Q	Kazakhstan	0–4	Russia	Nur-Sultan, Kazakhstan
20:00 UTC+6		Report	Cheryshev 19', 45+2'; Dzyuba 52'; Beisebekov 62' (o.g.)	Stadium: Astana Arena; Attendance: 29,582; Referee: Slavko Vinčić (Slovenia)

8 June 2019 Euro 2020 Q	Belgium	3–0	Kazakhstan	Brussels, Belgium
20:45 UTC+2	Mertens 11'; Castagne 14'; Lukaku 50'	Report		Stadium: King Baudouin Stadium; Attendance: 37,155; Referee: Irfan Peljto (Bosnia and Herzegovina)

11 June 2019 Euro 2020 Q	Kazakhstan	4–0	San Marino	Nur-Sultan, Kazakhstan
20:00 UTC+6	Kuat 45+1'; Fedin 62'; Suyumbayev 65'; Islamkhan 79'	Report		Stadium: Astana Arena; Attendance: 18,652; Referee: Bartosz Frankowski (Poland)

6 September 2019 Euro 2020 Q	Cyprus	1–1	Kazakhstan	Nicosia, Cyprus
19:00 UTC+3	Sotiriou 39'	Report	Shchotkin 2'	Stadium: GSP Stadium; Attendance: 5,639; Referee: Mattias Gestranius (Finland)

10 September 2019 Euro 2020 Q	Russia	1–0	Kazakhstan	Kaliningrad, Russia
20:45 UTC+2	Fernandes 89'	Report		Stadium: Kaliningrad Stadium; Attendance: 31,818; Referee: Nikola Dabanović (Montenegro)

10 October 2019 Euro 2020 Q	Kazakhstan	1–2	Cyprus	Nur-Sultan, Kazakhstan
20:00 UTC+6	Yerlanov 34'	Report	Sotiriou 73'; N. Ioannou 84'	Stadium: Astana Arena; Attendance: 11,769; Referee: Craig Pawson (England)

13 October 2019 Euro 2020 Q	Kazakhstan	0–2	Belgium	Nur-Sultan, Kazakhstan
19:00 UTC+6		Report	Batshuayi 21'; Meunier 53'	Stadium: Astana Arena; Attendance: 26,801; Referee: Gediminas Mažeika (Lithuania)

16 November 2019 Euro 2020 Q	San Marino	1–3	Kazakhstan	Serravalle, San Marino
18:00 UTC+1	Berardi 77'	Report	Zaynutdinov 6'; Suyumbayev 23'; Shchotkin 27'	Stadium: San Marino Stadium; Attendance: 643; Referee: Ali Palabıyık (Turkey)

19 November 2019 Euro 2020 Q	Scotland	3–1	Kazakhstan	Glasgow, Scotland
19:45 UTC+0	McGinn 48', 90+1'; Naismith 64'	Report	Zaynutdinov 34'	Stadium: Hampden Park; Attendance: 19,515; Referee: Bas Nijhuis (Netherlands)

=== 2020–2029 ===
Type	GP	W	D	L	GF	GA
Friendly Matches and Tournaments	16	4	2	10	14	26
2020–21 UEFA Nations League C	6	1	1	4	5	9
2022 FIFA World Cup qualification	8	0	3	5	5	20
2020–21 UEFA Nations League C play-outs	2	1	0	1	2	2
2022–23 UEFA Nations League C	6	4	1	1	8	6
UEFA Euro 2024 qualifying	11	6	0	5	16	17
2024–25 UEFA Nations League B	6	0	1	5	0	15
2026 FIFA World Cup qualification	8	2	2	4	9	13
2026–27 UEFA Nations League C	6	0	3	3	8	11
Total	69	18	13	38	67	119

==== 2020 ====
4 September 2020 2020–21 Nations League	Lithuania	0–2	Kazakhstan	Vilnius, Lithuania
19:00 UTC+3		Report	Zaynutdinov 4'; Kuat 86'	Stadium: LFF Stadium; Attendance: 0 Referee: Rade Obrenovič (Slovenia)

7 September 2020 2020–21 Nations League	Kazakhstan	1–2	Belarus	Almaty, Kazakhstan
20:00 UTC+6	Aimbetov 62'	Report	Bardachow 53'; Lisakovich 86'	Stadium: Central Stadium; Attendance: 0 Referee: Giorgi Kruashvili (Georgia)

11 October 2020 2020–21 Nations League	Kazakhstan	0–0	Albania	Almaty, Kazakhstan
19:00 UTC+6		Report		Stadium: Central Stadium; Attendance: 0 Referee: Dumitru Muntean (Moldova)

14 October 2020 2020–21 Nations League	Belarus	2–0	Kazakhstan	Minsk, Belarus
21:45 UTC+3	Yablonskiy 36'; Yuzepchuk 90+3'	Report		Stadium: Dinamo Stadium; Attendance: 2,074; Referee: Aleksandar Stavrev (North Macedonia)

11 November 2020 Friendly	Montenegro	0–0	Kazakhstan	Podgorica, Montenegro
18:00 UTC+1		Report		Stadium: Podgorica City Stadium; Attendance: 0 Referee: Dimitar Meckarovski (North Macedonia)

15 November 2020 2020–21 Nations League	Albania	3–1	Kazakhstan	Tirana, Albania
18:00 UTC+1	Cikalleshi 16'; Ismajli 23'; Manaj 63' (pen.)	Report	Abiken 25'	Stadium: Arena Kombëtare; Attendance: 0 Referee: Xavier Estrada Fernández (Spain)

18 November 2020 2020–21 Nations League	Kazakhstan	1–2	Lithuania	Almaty, Kazakhstan
21:00 UTC+6	Aimbetov 38'	Report	Vorobjovas 40'; Novikovas 90+4'	Stadium: Central Stadium; Attendance: 0 Referee: Hüseyin Göçek (Turkey)

==== 2021 ====
28 March 2021 2022 World Cup Q	Kazakhstan	0–2	France	Nur-Sultan, Kazakhstan
19:00 UTC+6		Report (FIFA); Report (UEFA)	Dembélé 19'; Malyi 44' (o.g.)	Stadium: Astana Arena; Attendance: 0 Referee: Aleksei Kulbakov (Belarus)

31 March 2021 2022 World Cup Q	Ukraine	1–1	Kazakhstan	Kyiv, Ukraine
21:45 UTC+3	Yaremchuk 20'	Report (FIFA); Report (UEFA)	Muzhikov 59'	Stadium: NSK Olimpiyskiy; Attendance: 0 Referee: Matej Jug (Slovenia)

4 June 2021 Friendly	North Macedonia	4–0	Kazakhstan	Skopje, North Macedonia
18:00 UTC+4	Alioski 35' (pen.); Trichkovski 57'; Ristovski 74'; Churlinov 76'	Report		Stadium: Toše Proeski Arena; Attendance: 10,000; Referee: Milovan Milačić (Montenegro)

1 September 2021 2022 World Cup Q	Kazakhstan	2–2	Ukraine	Nur-Sultan, Kazakhstan
20:00 UTC+6	Valiullin 74', 90+6'	Report (FIFA); Report (UEFA)	Yaremchuk 2'; Sikan 90+3'	Stadium: Astana Arena; Attendance: 6,274; Referee: Donatas Rumšas (Lithuania)

4 September 2021 2022 World Cup Q	Finland	1–0	Kazakhstan	Helsinki, Finland
16:00 UTC+3	Pohjanpalo 60'	Report (FIFA); Report (UEFA)		Stadium: Helsinki Olympic Stadium; Attendance: 10,167; Referee: Sergei Ivanov (Russia)

7 September 2021 2022 World Cup Q	Bosnia and Herzegovina	2–2	Kazakhstan	Zenica, Bosnia and Herzegovina
21:45 UTC+3	Pjanić 74' (pen.); Menalo 86'	Report (FIFA); Report (UEFA)	Kuat 52'; Zaynutdinov 90+5'	Stadium: Bilino Polje Stadium; Attendance: 3,980; Referee: Yigal Frid (Israel)

9 October 2021 2022 World Cup Q	Kazakhstan	0–2	Bosnia and Herzegovina	Nur-Sultan, Kazakhstan
19:00 UTC+6		Report (FIFA); Report (UEFA)	Prevljak 25', 66'	Stadium: Astana Arena; Attendance: 12,897; Referee: Davide Massa (Italy)

12 October 2021 2022 World Cup Q	Kazakhstan	0–2	Finland	Nur-Sultan, Kazakhstan
20:00 UTC+6		Report (FIFA); Report (UEFA)	Pukki 45', 48'	Stadium: Astana Arena; Attendance: 8,365; Referee: Halis Özkahya (Turkey)

13 November 2021 2022 World Cup Q	France	8–0	Kazakhstan	Paris, France
20:45 UTC+1	Mbappé 6', 12', 32', 87'; Benzema 55', 59'; Rabiot 75'; Griezmann 84' (pen.)	Report (FIFA); Report (UEFA)		Stadium: Parc des Princes; Attendance: 45,551; Referee: Glenn Nyberg (Sweden)

16 November 2021 Friendly	Kazakhstan	1–0	Tajikistan	Nur-Sultan, Kazakhstan
19:00 UTC+6	Zaynutdinov 13'	Report		Stadium: Astana Arena; Attendance: 1,388; Referee: Amine Kourgheli (Belarus)

==== 2022 ====
24 March 2022 2020–21 Nations League PO	Moldova	1–2	Kazakhstan	Chișinău, Moldova
19:00 UTC+2	Nicolaescu 45+1'	Report	Malyi 63'; Posmac 79' (o.g.)	Stadium: Zimbru Stadium; Attendance: 5,387; Referee: Anastasios Sidiropoulos (Greece)

29 March 2022 2020–21 Nations League PO	Kazakhstan	0–1 (a.e.t.) (2–2 agg.) (5–4 p)	Moldova	Nur-Sultan, Kazakhstan
20:00 UTC+6		Report	Armaș 13'	Stadium: Astana Arena; Attendance: 12,582; Referee: Ivan Kružliak (Slovakia)
	Penalties
	Abiken (penalty scored); Beysebekov (penalty missed); Dosmagambetov (penalty scored); Zaynutdinov (penalty scored); Zhaksylykov (penalty scored); Zhukov (penalty scored)		(penalty scored) Caimacov; (penalty scored) Armaș; (penalty scored) Mandrîcenco; (penalty scored) Crăciun; (penalty missed) Nicolaescu; (penalty missed) Revenco

3 June 2022 2022–23 Nations League	Kazakhstan	2–0	Azerbaijan	Nur-Sultan, Kazakhstan
20:00 UTC+6	Aymbetov 50', 60'	Report		Stadium: Astana Arena; Attendance: 19,823; Referee: István Vad (Hungary)

6 June 2022 2022–23 Nations League	Slovakia	0–1	Kazakhstan	Trnava, Slovakia
20:45 UTC+2		Report	Darabayev 26'	Stadium: Anton Malatinský Stadium; Attendance: 4,146; Referee: Kristo Tohver (Estonia)

10 June 2022 2022–23 Nations League	Belarus	1–1	Kazakhstan	Novi Sad, Serbia
20:45 UTC+2	Malkevich 84'	Report	Aymbetov 13'	Stadium: Karađorđe Stadium; Attendance: 0 Referee: Manuel Schüttengruber (Austria)

13 June 2022 2022–23 Nations League	Kazakhstan	2–1	Slovakia	Nur-Sultan, Kazakhstan
20:00 UTC+6	Vorogovsky 18'; Astanov 39'	Report	Bero 51'	Stadium: Astana Arena; Attendance: 28,745; Referee: Bram Van Driessche (Belgium)

22 September 2022 2022–23 Nations League	Kazakhstan	2–1	Belarus	Astana, Kazakhstan
20:00 UTC+6	Gabyshev 18'; Zaynutdinov 79'	Report	Savitsky 45+3'	Stadium: Astana Arena; Attendance: 29,637; Referee: Horațiu Feșnic (Romania)

25 September 2022 2022–23 Nations League	Azerbaijan	3–0	Kazakhstan	Baku, Azerbaijan
20:00 UTC+4	Marochkin 66' (o.g.); Ozobić 74'; Nuriyev 90+1'	Report		Stadium: Dalga Arena; Attendance: 2,950; Referee: Harm Osmers (Germany)

16 November 2022 Friendly	Uzbekistan	2–0	Kazakhstan	Tashkent, Uzbekistan
18:00 UTC+5	Erkinov 12'; Shomurodov 45'	Report		Stadium: Pakhtakor Stadium; Attendance: 5,000; Referee: Sergei Karasev (Russia)

19 November 2022 Friendly	United Arab Emirates	2–1	Kazakhstan	Abu Dhabi, United Arab Emirates
19:30 UTC+4	Lima 14', 71'	Report	Aymbetov 62'	Stadium: Al Nahyan Stadium; Referee: Mahmoud El Banna (Egypt)

==== 2023 ====
23 March 2023 Euro 2024 Q	Kazakhstan	1–2	Slovenia	Astana, Kazakhstan
21:00 UTC+6	Samorodov 24'	Report	Brekalo 47'; Vipotnik 78'	Stadium: Astana Arena; Attendance: 27,122; Referee: Glenn Nyberg (Sweden)

26 March 2023 Euro 2024 Q	Kazakhstan	3–2	Denmark	Astana, Kazakhstan
19:00 UTC+6	Zaynutdinov 73' (pen.); Tagybergen 86'; Aymbetov 89'	Report	Højlund 21', 36'	Stadium: Astana Arena; Attendance: 28,697; Referee: Novak Simović (Serbia)

16 June 2023 Euro 2024 Q	San Marino	0–3	Kazakhstan	Parma, Italy
20:45 UTC+2		Report	Vorogovsky 37'; Tagybergen 64' (pen.); Zaynutdinov 90+5'	Stadium: Stadio Ennio Tardini; Attendance: 528; Referee: Anastasios Papapetrou (Greece)

19 June 2023 Euro 2024 Q	Northern Ireland	0–1	Kazakhstan	Belfast, Northern Ireland
19:45 UTC+1		Report	Aymbetov 88'	Stadium: Windsor Park; Attendance: 18,002; Referee: Roi Reinshreiber (Israel)

7 September 2023 Euro 2024 Q	Kazakhstan	0–1	Finland	Astana, Kazakhstan
20:00 UTC+6		Report	Antman 78'	Stadium: Astana Arena; Attendance: 30,019; Referee: Radu Petrescu (Romania)

10 September 2023 Euro 2024 Q	Kazakhstan	1–0	Northern Ireland	Astana, Kazakhstan
19:00 UTC+6	Samorodov 27'	Report		Stadium: Astana Arena; Attendance: 28,458; Referee: Daniel Schlager (Germany)

14 October 2023 Euro 2024 Q	Denmark	3–1	Kazakhstan	Copenhagen, Denmark
20:45 UTC+2	Wind 36'; Skov 45+1', 48'	Report	Vorogovsky 58'	Stadium: Parken; Attendance: 35,845; Referee: Michael Oliver (England)

17 October 2023 Euro 2024 Q	Finland	1–2	Kazakhstan	Helsinki, Finland
19:00 UTC+3	Taylor 28'	Report	Zaynutdinov 77' (pen.), 89'	Stadium: Helsinki Olympic Stadium; Attendance: 30,375; Referee: Irfan Peljto (Bosnia and Herzegovina)

17 November 2023 Euro 2024 Q	Kazakhstan	3–1	San Marino	Astana, Kazakhstan
21:00 UTC+6	Chesnokov 19', 51'; Aymbetov 90+2' (pen.)	Report	Franciosi 60'	Stadium: Astana Arena; Attendance: 30,100; Referee: Harald Lechner (Austria)

20 November 2023 Euro 2024 Q	Slovenia	2–1	Kazakhstan	Ljubljana, Slovenia
20:45 UTC+1	Šeško 41' (pen.); Verbič 86'	Report	Orazov 48'	Stadium: Stožice Stadium; Attendance: 16,432; Referee: Szymon Marciniak (Poland)

==== 2024 ====
21 March 2024 Euro 2024 Q PO	Greece	5–0	Kazakhstan	Athens, Greece
20:45 UTC+1	Bakasetas 9' (pen.); Pelkas 15'; Ioannidis 37'; Kourbelis 40'; Tapalov 85' (o.g.)	Report		Stadium: Agia Sophia Stadium; Attendance: 25,200; Referee: Danny Makkelie (Netherlands)

26 March 2024 Friendly	Luxembourg	2–1	Kazakhstan	Luxembourg City, Luxembourg
20:45 UTC+1	Rodrigues 24'; Sinani 45'	Report	Sadybekov 2'	Stadium: Stade de Luxembourg; Attendance: 8,720; Referee: Christian Dingert (Germany)

7 June 2024 Friendly	Armenia	2–1	Kazakhstan	Yerevan, Armenia
20:00 UTC+4	Marochkin 4' (o.g.); Bichakhchyan 58'	Report	Islamkhan 90+6' (pen.)	Stadium: Vazgen Sargsyan Republican Stadium; Referee: Goga Kikacheishvili (Georgia)

11 June 2024 Friendly	Azerbaijan	3–2	Kazakhstan	Szombathely, Hungary
16:00 UTC+2	Emreli 42'; Mahmudov 51' (pen.); Bayramov 73'	Report	Vorogovsky 2'; Samorodov 28'	Stadium: Haladás Sportkomplexum; Referee: Bence Csonka (Hungary)

6 September 2024 2024–25 Nations League	Kazakhstan	0–0	Norway	Almaty, Kazakhstan
19:00 UTC+5		Report		Stadium: Almaty Central Stadium; Attendance: 23,173; Referee: Allard Lindhout (Netherlands)

9 September 2024 2024–25 Nations League	Slovenia	3–0	Kazakhstan	Ljubljana, Slovenia
20:45 UTC+2	Šeško 23', 28', 63'	Report		Stadium: Stožice Stadium; Attendance: 9,814; Referee: João Pinheiro (Portugal)

10 October 2024 2024–25 Nations League	Austria	4–0	Kazakhstan	Linz, Austria
20:45 UTC+2	Baumgartner 10'; Lienhart 53'; Sabitzer 57'; Seidl 79'	Report		Stadium: Raiffeisen Arena; Attendance: 14,500; Referee: Don Robertson (Scotland)

13 October 2024 2024–25 Nations League	Kazakhstan	0–1	Slovenia	Almaty, Kazakhstan
18:00 UTC+5		Report	Mlakar 65'	Stadium: Almaty Central Stadium; Attendance: 19,783; Referee: Craig Pawson (England)

14 November 2024 2024–25 Nations League	Kazakhstan	0–2	Austria	Astana, Kazakhstan
20:00 UTC+5		Report	Baumgartner 15'; Gregoritsch 25'	Stadium: Astana Arena; Attendance: 9,753; Referee: Marian Barbu (Romania)

17 November 2024 2024–25 Nations League	Norway	5–0	Kazakhstan	Oslo, Norway
18:00 UTC+2	Haaland 23', 37', 71'; Sørloth 41'; Nusa 76'	Report		Stadium: Ullevaal Stadion; Attendance: 23,458; Referee: Jasper Vergoote (Belgium)

==== 2025 ====
17 February 2025 Friendly	Kazakhstan	0–2	North Korea	Antalya, Turkey
19:30 UTC+3		Report	Ri Il-song 70', 90+5'	Stadium: Kaya Palazzo Golf Resort; Attendance: 50; Referee: Atilla Karaoğlan (Turkey)

19 March 2025 Friendly	Curaçao	0–2	Kazakhstan	Antalya, Turkey
19:30 UTC+3		Report	Samorodov 15'; Tagybergen 36'	Stadium: Gloria Sports Arena; Attendance: 0 Referee: Atilla Karaoğlan (Turkey)

22 March 2025 2026 World Cup Q	Wales	3–1	Kazakhstan	Cardiff, Wales
19:45 UTC+0	D. James 9'; B. Davies 47'; Matondo 90'	Report	Tagybergen 32' (pen.)	Stadium: Cardiff City Stadium; Attendance: 32,473; Referee: Donatas Rumšas (Lithuania)

25 March 2025 2026 World Cup Q	Liechtenstein	0–2	Kazakhstan	Vaduz, Liechtenstein
20:45 UTC+1		Report	Samorodov 42'; Marochkin 45'	Stadium: Rheinpark Stadion; Attendance: 1,123; Referee: John Beaton (Scotland)

5 June 2025 Friendly	Belarus	4–1	Kazakhstan	Barysaw, Belarus
20:00 UTC+3	Gromyko 25'; Bocherov 31'; Melnichenko 50'; Shikavka 85'	Report	Kenzhebek 74'	Stadium: Borisov Arena; Attendance: 4,443; Referee: Sergei Karasev (Russia)

9 June 2025 2026 World Cup Q	Kazakhstan	0–1	North Macedonia	Astana, Kazakhstan
19:00 UTC+5		Report	Trajkovski 33'	Stadium: Astana Arena; Attendance: 27,694; Referee: Filip Glova (Slovakia)

4 September 2025 2026 World Cup Q	Kazakhstan	0–1	Wales	Astana, Kazakhstan
19:00 UTC+5		Report	Moore 24'	Stadium: Astana Arena; Attendance: 28,219; Referee: Alejandro Hernández Hernández (Spain)

7 September 2025 2026 World Cup Q	Belgium	6–0	Kazakhstan	Anderlecht, Belgium
20:45 UTC+2	De Bruyne 42', 84'; Doku 44', 60'; Raskin 51'; Meunier 87'	Report		Stadium: Constant Vanden Stock Stadium; Attendance: 15,119; Referee: Radu Petrescu (Romania)

10 October 2025 2026 World Cup Q	Kazakhstan	4–0	Liechtenstein	Astana, Kazakhstan
19:00 UTC+5	Kenzhebek 26', 59'; Zaynutdinov 28'; Kasym 81'	Report		Stadium: Astana Arena; Attendance: 26,539; Referee: Paweł Raczkowski (Poland)

13 October 2025 2026 World Cup Q	North Macedonia	1–1	Kazakhstan	Skopje, North Macedonia
20:45 UTC+2	Bardhi 74'	Report	Karaman 54'	Stadium: Toše Proeski Arena; Attendance: 19,929; Referee: Juan Martínez Munuera (Spain)

15 November 2025 2026 World Cup Q	Kazakhstan	1–1	Belgium	Astana, Kazakhstan
19:00 UTC+5	Satpayev 9'	Report	Vanaken 48'	Stadium: Astana Arena; Attendance: 28,012; Referee: Donatas Rumšas (Lithuania)

18 November 2025 Friendly	Faroe Islands	1–0	Kazakhstan	Pula, Croatia
18:00 UTC+1	Knudsen 25'	Report		Stadium: Stadion Aldo Drosina; Attendance: 75; Referee: Duje Strukan (Croatia)

==== 2026 ====
25 March 2026 2026 FIFA Series	Kazakhstan	2–0	Namibia	Astana, Kazakhstan
17:00 UTC+5	Vorogovsky 12'; Kasym 79'	Report		Stadium: Astana Arena; Attendance: 11,894; Referee: Viktar Shymusik (Belarus)

31 March 2026 2026 FIFA Series	Kazakhstan	1–0	Comoros	Astana, Kazakhstan
17:00 UTC+5	Orazov 4'	Report		Stadium: Astana Arena; Attendance: 5,341; Referee: Ishmael Barbara (Malta)

6 June 2026 Friendly	Armenia	1–1	Kazakhstan	Yerevan, Armenia
18:00 UTC+4	Spertsyan 53'	Report	Samorodov 50'	Stadium: Vazgen Sargsyan Republican Stadium; Attendance: 8,400; Referee: Kyriakos Athanasiou (Cyprus)

9 June 2026 Friendly	Hungary	3–1	Kazakhstan	Debrecen, Hungary
19:00 UTC+2	Szoboszlai 52'; Schäfer 67'; R. Tóth 90+3'	Report	Malyi 9'	Stadium: Nagyerdei Stadion; Attendance: 19,595; Referee: Pavle Ilić (Serbia)

26 September 2026 2026–27 Nations League	Faroe Islands	1–1	Kazakhstan	Tórshavn, Faroe Islands
17:00 UTC+1	Samuelsen 14'	Report	Yerlanov 26'	Stadium: Tórsvøllur; Attendance: 2,458; Referee: Ishmael Barbara (Malta)

29 September 2026 2026–27 Nations League	Slovakia	2–1	Kazakhstan	Košice, Slovakia
20:45 UTC+2	L. Sauer 26'; Hancko 82'	Report	Karimov 35'	Stadium: Košická futbalová aréna Attendance: 9,109; Referee: Patrik Kolarić (Croatia)

2 October 2026 2026–27 Nations League	Kazakhstan	1–2	Moldova	Astana, Kazakhstan
19:00 UTC+5	Alip 64'	Report	Cleșcenco 45+1'; Popescu 50'	Stadium: Astana Arena; Attendance: 20,119; Referee: Marian Barbu (Romania)

6 October 2026 2026–27 Nations League	Kazakhstan	2–2	Faroe Islands	Astana, Kazakhstan
19:00 UTC+5	Malyi 68' (red card) 85'; Alip 76'	Report	Knudsen 22'; Turi 6'	Stadium: Astana Arena; Attendance: 10,315; Referee: Kristo Tohver (Estonia)

13 November 2026 2026–27 Nations League	Moldova	2–1	Kazakhstan	Chișinău, Moldova
21:45 UTC+2	Popescu 39', 77'	Report	Chesnokov 51'	Stadium: Stadionul Zimbru; Attendance: 6,783; Referee: Andrea Colombo (Italy)

16 November 2026 2026–27 Nations League	Kazakhstan	2–2	Slovakia	Astana, Kazakhstan
20:00 UTC+5	Chesnokov 29'; Vorogovsky 65'	Report	Boženík 56'; Kaprálik 90+5'	Stadium: Astana Arena; Attendance: 13,244; Referee: Aliyar Aghayev (Azerbaijan)

== Record versus other countries ==
As of match played 6 October 2026 against Faroe Islands.

National team	Played	Won	Drawn	Lost	GF	GA	GD	% Won	Confederation
Albania	4	0	1	3	2	6	−4	0.00	UEFA
Andorra	4	3	1	0	11	2	+9	75.00	UEFA
Armenia	9	1	3	5	8	15	−7	11.11	UEFA
Austria	6	0	2	4	0	12	−12	0.00	UEFA
Azerbaijan	12	5	3	4	17	15	+2	41.67	UEFA
Bahrain	1	1	0	0	1	0	+1	100.00	AFC
Belarus	8	1	2	5	7	20	−13	12.50	UEFA
Belgium	8	0	3	5	4	20	−16	0.00	UEFA
Bosnia and Herzegovina	2	0	1	1	2	4	−2	0.00	UEFA
Bulgaria	2	0	0	2	2	4	−2	0.00	UEFA
Burkina Faso	1	0	1	0	0	0	+0	0.00	CAF
China	3	1	0	2	2	5	−3	33.33	AFC
Comoros	1	1	0	0	1	0	+1	100.00	CAF
Croatia	2	0	0	2	1	5	−4	0.00	UEFA
Curaçao	1	1	0	0	2	0	+2	100.00	CONCACAF
Cyprus	4	0	1	3	4	8	−4	0.00	UEFA
Czech Republic	2	0	0	2	3	6	−3	0.00	UEFA
Denmark	6	1	0	5	7	17	−10	16.67	UEFA
England	2	0	0	2	1	9	−8	0.00	UEFA
Estonia	3	1	2	0	3	1	+2	33.33	UEFA
Faroe Islands	7	1	3	3	9	11	−2	14.29	UEFA
Finland	7	1	1	5	3	9	−6	14.29	UEFA
France	2	0	0	2	0	10	−10	0.00	UEFA
Georgia	6	1	2	3	4	7	−3	16.67	UEFA
Germany	4	0	0	4	1	14	−13	0.00	UEFA
Greece	4	0	0	4	2	12	−10	0.00	UEFA
Hungary	3	1	0	2	1	8	−7	33.33	UEFA
Iceland	2	0	1	1	0	3	−3	0.00	UEFA
Iran	2	0	0	2	0	5	−5	0.00	AFC
Iraq	4	2	2	0	7	4	+3	50.00	AFC
(Republic of Ireland) Ireland	2	0	0	2	2	5	−3	0.00	UEFA
Japan	3	0	1	2	2	10	−8	0.00	AFC
Jordan	2	1	0	1	1	2	−1	50.00	AFC
Kuwait	1	0	1	0	0	0	+0	0.00	AFC
Kyrgyzstan	8	5	2	1	18	6	+12	62.50	AFC
Laos	1	1	0	0	5	0	+5	100.00	AFC
Latvia	7	1	4	2	5	7	−2	14.29	UEFA
Lebanon	2	0	0	2	1	5	−4	0.00	AFC
Libya	1	1	0	0	1	0	+1	100.00	CAF
Liechtenstein	2	2	0	0	6	0	+6	100.00	UEFA
Lithuania	3	1	1	1	4	3	+1	33.33	UEFA
Luxembourg	1	0	0	1	1	2	−1	0.00	UEFA
Macau	2	2	0	0	8	0	+8	100.00	AFC
Malta	1	0	1	0	2	2	+0	0.00	UEFA
Moldova	8	3	1	4	8	8	+0	37.50	UEFA
Montenegro	4	0	1	3	0	11	−11	0.00	UEFA
Namibia	1	1	0	0	2	0	+2	100.00	CAF
Nepal	2	2	0	0	10	0	+10	100.00	AFC
Netherlands	2	0	0	2	2	5	−3	0.00	UEFA
North Korea	2	0	1	1	0	2	−2	0.00	AFC
North Macedonia	3	0	1	2	1	6	−5	0.00	UEFA
Northern Ireland	2	2	0	0	2	0	+2	100.00	UEFA
Norway	2	0	1	1	0	5	−5	0.00	UEFA
Oman	1	1	0	0	3	1	+2	100.00	AFC
Pakistan	3	3	0	0	14	0	+14	100.00	AFC
Palestine	2	2	0	0	5	2	+3	100.00	AFC
Poland	5	0	1	4	3	12	−9	0.00	UEFA
Portugal	3	0	0	3	1	6	−5	0.00	UEFA
Qatar	4	2	0	2	4	6	−2	50.00	AFC
Romania	2	0	1	1	1	3	−2	0.00	UEFA
Russia	4	0	1	3	0	11	−11	0.00	UEFA
San Marino	4	4	0	0	13	2	+11	100.00	UEFA
Saudi Arabia	2	0	0	2	0	4	−4	0.00	AFC
Scotland	2	1	0	1	4	3	+1	50.00	UEFA
Serbia	2	1	0	1	2	2	+0	50.00	UEFA
Singapore	1	0	1	0	0	0	+0	0.00	AFC
Slovakia	3	2	0	1	4	3	+1	66.67	UEFA
Slovenia	4	0	0	4	2	8	−6	0.00	UEFA
South Korea	2	0	1	1	1	4	−3	0.00	AFC
Sweden	2	0	0	2	0	3	−3	0.00	UEFA
Syria	4	0	1	3	1	8	−7	0.00	AFC
Tajikistan	5	4	1	0	9	3	+6	80.00	AFC
Thailand	2	0	2	0	3	3	+0	0.00	AFC
Turkey	6	0	0	6	2	19	−17	0.00	UEFA
Turkmenistan	3	1	2	0	2	1	+1	33.33	AFC
Ukraine	6	0	2	4	6	12	−6	0.00	UEFA
United Arab Emirates	4	1	0	3	6	11	−5	25.00	AFC
Uzbekistan	7	1	3	3	4	10	−6	14.29	AFC
Vietnam	1	0	0	1	1	2	−1	0.00	AFC
Wales	2	0	0	2	1	4	−3	0.00	UEFA
Total	269	68	60	141	282	450	−168	25.28	4/6

== International goalscorers ==
As of match played 12 November 2023

All goalscorers from International matches.

14 goals

- Baktiyar Zaynutdinov

13 goals

- Ruslan Baltiev

12 goals

- Viktor Zubarev

8 goals

- Abat Aymbetov
- Dmitry Byakov
- Sergei Khizhnichenko

7 goals

- Nurbol Zhumaskaliyev

6 goals

- Igor Avdeyev
- Islambek Kuat
- Oleg Litvinenko
- Sergei Ostapenko

5 goals

- Andrei Finonchenko
- Yuriy Logvinenko
- Kairat Nurdauletov

4 goals

- Askhat Kadyrkulov
- Maksim Shevchenko
- Gafurzhan Suyumbayev

3 goals

- Bauyrzhan Dzholchiyev
- Bolat Esmagambetov
- Konstantin Gorovenka
- Bauyrzhan Islamkhan
- Andrei Karpovich
- Alexei Klishin
- Ulan Konysbayev
- Vladimir Loginov
- Yevgeniy Lunyov
- Roman Murtazayev
- Azat Nurgaliev
- Tanat Nusserbayev
- Aleksey Shchotkin
- Daurenbek Tazhimbetov
- Bauyrzhan Turysbek
- Yan Vorogovskiy
- Pavel Yevteyev

2 goals

- Rinat Abdulin
- Kairat Ashirbekov
- Ruslan Duzmambetov
- Sergey Gridin
- Aleksandr Kuchma
- Zhambyl Kukeyev
- Nurken Mazbaev
- Serikzhan Muzhikov
- Maksim Nizovtsev
- Oralkhan Omirtayev
- Yerkebulan Seydakhmet
- Dmitri Shomko
- Samat Smakov
- Murat Suyumagambetov
- Askhat Tagybergen
- Roman Uzdenov
- Ruslan Valiullin
- Unknown

1 goals

- Aybol Abiken
- Askar Abildaev
- Yuri Aksenov
- Elkhan Astanov
- Kairat Aubakirov
- Bakhtiyar Baiseitov
- Maksat Baizhanov
- Vencheslav Bogatyrev
- Anton Chichulin
- Aslan Darabayev
- Viktor Dmitrenko
- Aleksandr Familtsev
- Maxim Fedin
- Mikhail Gabyshev
- Ruslan Imankulov
- Oleg Kapustnikov
- Daniar Kenzhekhanov
- Andrey Kucheryavykh
- Evgeniy Lovchev
- Guram Makayev
- Serhiy Malyi
- Nurmat Mirzabayev
- Daniyar Mukanov
- Vladimir Niederhaus
- Yuriy Pertsukh
- Denis Rodionov
- Maksim Samorodov
- Heinrich Schmidtgal
- Vitali Sparyshev
- Yevgeni Tarasov
- Murat Tleshev
- Yerkebulan Tungyshbayev
- Rafael Urazbakhtin
- Valeriy Yablochkin
- Temirlan Yerlanov
- Vitali Yevstigneyev
- Dmitri Yurist
- Maksim Zhalmagambetov

Own goal

- Sadiq Saadoun Abdul-Ridha (29 June 1997 vs Iraq)
- Ismail Al-Ajmi (11 August 2010 vs Oman)
- Josep Gómes (16 October 2018 vs Andorra)
- Veaceslav Posmac (24 March 2022 vs Moldova)

== See also ==
- Kazakhstani football clubs in international competitions
