= 2000–01 Kazakhstan Cup =

Tournament details
- Country: Kazakhstan
- Teams: 16

Final positions
- Champions: Zhenis
- Runners-up: Irtysh

Tournament statistics
- Matches played: 22
- Goals scored: 49 (2.23 per match)
- Top goal scorer(s): Vladimir Bayramov (Access-Golden Grain) 3 Ruslan Baltiyev (Access-Golden Grain) 3 Sergei Mataganov (CSKA-Kairat) 3

The 2000–01 Kazakhstan Cup was the ninth season of the Kazakhstan Cup, the annual nationwide football cup competition of Kazakhstan since the independence of the country. The competition began on 8 Jule 2000, and ended with the final in June 2001. Kairat were the defending champions, having won their third cup in the 1999-00 competition.

== First round ==
8 Jule 2000	Zhiger	0-1	Zhenis	K. Munaitpasov Central Stadium, Shymkent
			Niyazymbetov 83'	Attendance: 500; Referee: Vladimir Donde (Almaty)

5 September 2000	Zhenis	(w/o) (+/- agg.)	Zhiger

25 Jule 2000	Yessil-Bogatyr	2-1	Akmola	Avangard Stadium, Petropavl
	Bayramov 65'; Timofeev 75'		Kononenko 70'	Attendance: 7000; Referee: Rashit Khusnutdinov (Oral)

25 August 2000	Akmola	0-1 (1-3 agg.)	Yessil-Bogatyr	Torpedo Stadium, Kokshetau
			Bayramov 15'	Attendance: 500; Referee: Isa Asanov (Temirtau)

24 August 2000	Tobol	2-1	AES-Yelimay	Central Stadium, Kostanay
	Vishnichenko 1'; Badlo 27'		Mukanov 3'	Attendance: 1500; Referee: Sergei Kapanin (Karagandy)

5 September 2000	AES-Yelimay	4-0 (5-2 agg.)	Tobol	Spartak Stadium, Semey
	Aubakirov 14' (pen.); Mukanov 30'; Mityaev 48'; Smirnykh 60'			Attendance: 3000; Referee: Gennady Kamchatny (Almaty)

26 August 2000	Kaisar-Hurricane	(w/o) (+/- agg.)	Batyr

26 August 2000	Irtysh	(w/o) (+/- agg.)	Zhetysu

26 August 2000	Kairat	(w/o) (+/- agg.)	Taraz

26 August 2000	Shakhter-Ispat-Karmet	1-0	Vostok	Shakhter Stadium, Karagandy
	Fedorov 63'			Attendance: 4000; Referee: Gennady Kamchetny (Almaty)

5 October 2000	Vostok	0-1 (0-2 agg.)	Shakhter-Ispat-Karmet	Vostok Stadium, Oskemen
			Fedorov 42'	Attendance: 2000; Referee: Vladimir Galkin (Almaty)

28 August 2000	Dostyk	1-3	CSKA-Kairat	K. Munaitpasov Central Stadium, Shymkent
	Baybosynov 12'		Kutsov 18'; Mataganov 20', 60'

25 September 2000	CSKA-Kairat	1-1 (4-2 agg.)	Dostyk	Central Stadium, Almaty
	Shayakhmetov 54'		Korinenko 15'	Attendance: 1500; Referee: Andrei Usov (Semey)

== Quarter-finals ==
5 October 2000	Kaisar-Hurricane	2-0	Irtysh	G. Muratbayev Central Stadium, Kyzylorda
	Bezzubko 7'; Asukhanov 45'			Attendance: 1500; Referee: Yuri Mizrakhil (Almaty)

11 October 2000	Irtysh	3-0 (3-2 agg.)	Kaisar-Hurricane	Central Stadium, Pavlodar
	Mendes 3'; Chizhikov 14'; Krotov 20'			Attendance: 4000; Referee: Viktor Zayakin (Semey)

21 October 2000	Yessil-Bogatyr	3-2	CSKA-Kairat	Avangard Stadium, Petropavl
	Baltiyev 27', 29' 73' (pen.)		Berdyugin 10'; Mataganov 86'	Attendance: 6000; Referee: Sergei Tsaregradskiy (Semey)

25 October 2000	CSKA-Kairat	1-2 (3-5 agg.)	Yessil-Bogatyr	Central Stadium, Almaty
	Karakulov 79' (pen.)		Koloda 13'; Bayramov 90+1'	Attendance: 1000; Referee: Pavel Saliy (Oskemen)

21 October 2000	AES-Yelimay	4-1	Zhenis	Spartak Stadium, Semey
	Proskurin 39', 60'; Mityaev 47'; Gomleshko 60'		Mazbayev 44'	Attendance: 1500; Referee: Vladimir Donde (Almaty)

25 October 2000	Zhenis	4-0 (5-4 agg.)	AES-Yelimay	K. Munaitpasov Stadium, Astana
	Kornienko 10' (pen.) 21'; Lotov 46'; Aksyonov 51'			Attendance: 4000; Referee: Gennady Zhukovskiy (Aktobe)

26 October 2000	Shakhter-Ispat-Karmet	0–0	Kairat	Shakhter Stadium, Karagandy
				Attendance: 1000; Referee: Viktor Zayakin (Semey)

30 October 2000	Kairat	1-1 (1-1 agg.)	Shakhter-Ispat-Karmet	Central Stadium, Almaty
	Byakov 82'		Imankulov 23'	Attendance: 2000; Referee: Aleksandr Borisov (Semey)

== Semi-finals ==
6 May 2001	Zhenis	1-0	Yessil-Bogatyr	K. Munaitpasov Stadium, Astana
	Sepashvili 8'			Attendance: 8500; Referee: Viktor Zayakin (Semey)

18 May 2001	Yessil-Bogatyr	0-0 (0-1 agg.)	Zhenis	Avangard Stadium, Petropavl
				Attendance: 8500; Referee: Viktor Zayakin (Semey)

6 May 2001	Irtysh	2-0	Shakhter-Ispat-Karmet	Central Stadium, Pavlodar
	Ashurmamadov 23' (pen.); Soares 63'			Attendance: 8000; Referee: Aleksandr Borisov (Semey)

16 May 2001	Shakhter-Ispat-Karmet	0–0 (0-2 agg.)	Irtysh	Shakhter Stadium, Karagandy
				Attendance: 2000; Referee: Sergei Rovenskikh (Almaty)

== Final ==
17 June 2001

Zhenis	1–1	Irtysh
Tlekhugov 55'		Mendes 26' (pen.)
Penalties
Kozyulin (penalty scored); Tlekhugov (penalty scored); Lovchev (penalty scored); Zenchenkov (penalty scored); Aksyonov (penalty scored)	5-4	Krotov (penalty scored); Mendes (penalty scored); Kirov (penalty scored); Urdabayev (penalty scored); Klishin (penalty missed)

K. Munaitpasov Stadium, Astana
Attendance: 10000
Referee: Sergei Rovenskikh (Almaty)
