= 2002 Kazakhstan Premier League =

Kazakhstan Premier League
- Season: 2002
- Champions: Irtysh Pavlodar
- Champions League: Irtysh Pavlodar
- UEFA Cup: Atyrau; Zhenis Astana
- UEFA Intertoto Cup: Tobol
- Top goalscorer: Yevgeniy Lunyov (16)

The 2002 Kazakhstan Premier League was the 11th season of the Kazakhstan Premier League, the highest football league competition in Kazakhstan, and took place between 28 April and 24 October.

== Teams ==
No teams were promoted from the Kazakhstan First Division, and with Ekibastuzets-NK, Zhetysu, Taraz, Dostyk and Mangystau relegated the previous season the league was reduced to 12 teams. Before the start of the season Shakhter-Ispat-Karmet were renamed Shakhter Karagandy.

=== Team overview ===
Locations of teams in the 2002 Kazakhstan Premier League

Team	Location	Venue	Capacity
Aktobe-Lento	Aktobe	Central Stadium	13,200
Atyrau	Atyrau	Munaishy Stadium	9,500
Esil	Kokshetau	Okzhetpes Stadium	4,158
Esil Bogatyr	Petropavl	Karasai Stadium	11,000
Irtysh	Pavlodar	Central Stadium	15,000
Kairat	Almaty	Central Stadium	23,804
Kaisar	Kyzylorda	Gany Muratbayev Stadium	7,500
Shakhter Karagandy	Karagandy	Shakhter Stadium	20,000
Tobol	Kostanay	Central Stadium	8,323
Vostok Altyn	Oskemen	Vostok Stadium	8,500
Yelimay	Semey	Spartak Stadium	
Zhenis Astana	Astana	Kazhymukan Munaitpasov Stadium	12,350

== First round ==
=== League table ===
Pos	Team	Pld	W	D	L	GF	GA	GD	Pts	Qualification
1	Irtysh	22	16	4	2	46	9	+37	52	Qualification for the championship round
2	Atyrau	22	15	3	4	28	14	+14	48	Qualification for the championship round
3	Zhenis Astana	22	11	7	4	32	14	+18	40	Qualification for the championship round
4	Tobol	22	11	4	7	33	27	+6	37	Qualification for the championship round
5	Shakhter Karagandy	22	10	6	6	35	21	+14	36	Qualification for the championship round
6	Aktobe-Lento	22	10	4	8	25	26	−1	34	Qualification for the championship round
7	Yelimay	22	9	6	7	26	28	−2	33	Qualification for the relegation round
8	Esil Bogatyr	22	6	7	9	18	25	−7	25	Qualification for the relegation round
9	Kairat	22	6	6	10	24	29	−5	24	Qualification for the relegation round
10	Vostok Altyn	22	6	1	15	17	31	−14	19	Qualification for the relegation round
11	Kaisar	22	3	2	17	13	46	−33	11	Qualification for the relegation round
12	Esil	22	2	4	16	13	40	−27	10	Qualification for the relegation round

Source: kpfl.kz
Rules for classification: 1) points; 2) goal difference; 3) number of goals scored.

=== Results ===
Home \ Away	AKT	ATY	ESK	EBP	IRT	KRT	KSR	SHA	TOB	VOS	YEL	ZHN
Aktobe		1–0	0–0	1–2	2–1	2–3	1–0	2–1	1–0	3–0 (Note: Match awarded.)	3–2	0–0
Atyrau	1–0		2–0	1–0	1–0	1–0	2–0	1–0	2–0	3–0	3–0	1–0
Esil	0–1	0–1		0–2	1–3	1–1	1–2	1–1	1–2	3–0	1–1	1–3
Esil Bogatyr	2–1	1–3	0–1		1–1	1–1	2–0	0–1	1–1	2–0	0–0	1–1
Irtysh Pavlodar	1–0	4–0	3–0	3–0		4–0	5–0	2–0	5–0	1–0	5–1	1–0
Kairat	1–1	0–0	1–0	1–1	1–2		5–0	0–2	3–1	1–2	1–0	2–1
Kaisar	1–3	1–2	2–0	0–1	0–1	2–1		1–3	1–1	0–1	0–0	0–1
Shakhter Karagandy	4–1	4–3	4–0	0–0	1–2	2–2	3–0		0–1	1–0	4–1	1–1
Tobol	0–0	1–0	4–1	3–0	0–0	3–0	4–1	2–0		3–0	3–1	1–2
Vostok Altyn	1–2	0–1	3–1	2–1	0–1	1–0	4–1	1–3	0–1		2–3	0–0
Yelimay	4–1	1–1	1–0	2–0	0–0	1–0	2–0	0–0	3–2	1–0		2–0
Zhenis Astana	2–1	1–1	3–0	2–0	1–1	1–0	3–1	0–0	5–0	3–0	2–0	

Legend: Blue = home team win; Yellow = draw; Red = away team win.

== Second round ==
=== Championship round ===
Pos	Team	Pld	W	D	L	GF	GA	GD	Pts	Qualification
1	Irtysh (C)	32	21	8	3	63	14	+49	71	Qualification for the Champions League first qualifying round
2	Atyrau	32	19	6	7	43	22	+21	63	Qualification for the UEFA Cup qualifying round
3	Tobol	32	15	7	10	45	43	+2	52	Qualification for the Intertoto Cup first round
4	Zhenis Astana	32	14	10	8	40	23	+17	52	Qualification for the UEFA Cup qualifying round
5	Shakhter Karagandy	32	13	7	12	37	40	−3	46	
6	Aktobe-Lento	32	11	10	11	45	39	+6	43	

Source: http://www.kpfl.kz/eng/chempionat_2002
Rules for classification: 1) points; 2) goal difference; 3) number of goals scored.
(C) Champions

=== Results ===
Home \ Away	AKT	ATY	IRT	SHA	TOB	ZHN
Aktobe		1–0	1–1	1–3	2–2	1–0
Atyrau	2–1		0–0	1–0	2–0	2–0
Irtysh Pavlodar	3–0 (Note: Match awarded.)	2–2		3–0	3–0	1–0
Shakhter Karagandy	1–2	1–1	0–0		1–1	1–1
Tobol	2–1	1–0	0–3	3–2		1–1
Zhenis Astana	0–0	1–0	2–1	2–0	1–2	

Legend: Blue = home team win; Yellow = draw; Red = away team win.

=== Relegation round ===
Pos	Team	Pld	W	D	L	GF	GA	GD	Pts
7	Kairat	32	13	7	12	41	36	+5	46
8	Yelimay	32	11	6	15	33	51	−18	39
9	Esil Bogatyr	32	10	7	15	31	35	−4	37
10	Kaisar	32	10	2	20	31	55	−24	32
11	Vostok Altyn	32	10	2	20	27	47	−20	32
12	Esil	32	6	6	20	25	56	−31	24

Source: kpfl.kz
Rules for classification: 1) points; 2) goal difference; 3) number of goals scored.

=== Results ===
Home \ Away	ESK	EBP	KRT	KSR	VOS	YEL
Esil		4–2	0–0	3–0	1–1	2–1
Esil Bogatyr	5–0		0–1	2–1	1–0	2–0
Kairat	1–0	2–1		1–0	3–2	5–0
Kaisar	3–0	2–1	2–0		3–0 (Note: Match awarded.)	3–2
Vostok Altyn	3–1	1–0	1–0	0–2		2–0
Yelimay	0–1	1–0	1–4	0–2	1–0	

Legend: Blue = home team win; Yellow = draw; Red = away team win.

== Season statistics ==
=== Top scorers ===
As of match played 24 October 2001

Rank	Player	Club	Goals
1	(Kazakhstan) Yevgeniy Lunyov	Shakhter	16
2	(Kazakhstan) Aleksandr Shatskikh	Irtysh	13
2	(Kazakhstan) Murat Tleshev	Shakhter	13
2	(Kazakhstan) Alibek Buleshev	Kairat	13
5	(Kazakhstan) Oleg Litvinenko	Zhenis/Elimay	11
6	(Kazakhstan) Dmitriy Byakov	Kairat	11
6	(Kazakhstan) Vitaliy Kitsak	Atyrau	11
8	(Kazakhstan) Sergei Kondratskiy	Esil Bogatyr	10
9	(Brazil) Mendes	Zhenis	9
9	(Kazakhstan) Nurken Mazbaev	Tobol	9
9	(Kazakhstan) Dmitriy Yurist	Aktobe-Lento	9
9	(Kazakhstan) Sergei Kalabukhin	Irtysh	9
