= Aubakirov =

Aubakirov (Kazakh: Әубәкіров) is a surname. Notable people with this surname include:

- Kairat Aubakirov (born 1971), Kazakh football player
- Toktar Aubakirov (born 1946), Kazakh cosmonaut
