= 2001 Kazakhstan Cup final (June) =

- Event: 2000–01 Kazakhstan Cup
Zhenis	Irtysh
1	1
- Zhenis won 5–4 on penalties
- Date: 17 June 2001
- Venue: Kazhimukan Munaitpasov Stadium, Astana
- Referee: Sergei Rovenskikh (Almaty)
- Attendance: 10,000

The 2001 Kazakhstan Cup final was the ninth final of the Kazakhstan Cup. The match was contested by Zhenis and Irtysh at Kazhimukan Munaitpasov Stadium in Astana. The match was played on 17 June 2001 and was the final match of the competition.

== Background ==
Zhenis played the first Kazakhstan Cup Final.

Irtysh played the second Kazakhstan Cup Final. In the first final they won Kaisar-Hurricane with the score 2–1.
