= Kazakhstani Footballer of the Year =

National sporting award

The title Kazakhstani Footballer of the Year (Қазақстанның ең үздік футболшысы, Qazaqstannyñ eñ üzdık futbolşysy) has been awarded in Kazakhstan since 1992. The award is determined by a poll of Kazakhstani professional journalists, football coaches, specialists, veterans and captains of playing teams of Premier League. Generally there are two different pools. The first one is conducted by the Football Federation (1992–2005, 2008) and others are conducted by football journal GOAL (starting from 1999) and sports.kz (starting from 2011).

== Annual Awards ==
| | Football Federation poll | | | GOAL Journal poll | | | sports.kz poll | | |
| Season | Player | Pos | Club | Player | Pos | Club | Player | Pos | Club |
|---|---|---|---|---|---|---|---|---|---|
| 1992 | (Kazakhstan) Volgin | CM | KRT | | | | | | |
| 1993 | (Kazakhstan) Kurganskiy | FW | EKI | | | | | | |
| 1994 | (Kazakhstan) Kanat Musataev | CD | ORD | | | | | | |
| 1995 | (Kazakhstan) Miroshnichenko | FW | SEM | | | | | | |
| 1996 | (Kazakhstan) Voskoboynikov | GK | TAR | | | | | | |
| 1997 | (Kazakhstan) Voskoboynikov | GK | TAR | | | | | | |
| 1998 | (Kazakhstan) Voskoboynikov | GK | KSR | | | | | | |
| 1999 | (Kazakhstan) Avdeev | CD | KYZ | (Kazakhstan) Zubarev | FW | IRT | | | |
| 2000 | (Kazakhstan) Avdeev | CD | KYZ | (Brazil) Mendes | FW | IRT | | | |
| 2001 | (Kazakhstan) Tlekhugov | FW | A64 | (Kazakhstan) Tlekhugov | FW | A64 | | | |
| 2002 | (Kazakhstan) Lovchev | CM | A64 | (Kazakhstan) Lovchev | CM | A64 | | | |
| 2003 | (Kazakhstan) Zhumaskaliyev | FW | TOB | (Kazakhstan) Novikov | GK | IRT | | | |
| 2004 | (Kazakhstan) Smakov | CD | KRT | (Kazakhstan) Smakov | CD | KRT | | | |
| 2005 | (Kazakhstan) Zhumaskaliyev | FW | TOB | (Kazakhstan) Litvinenko | FW | ALM | | | |
| 2006 | not held | | | (Kazakhstan) Loria | GK | A64 | | | |
| 2007 | not held | | | (Kazakhstan) Smakov | CD | AKT | | | |
| 2008 | (Kazakhstan) Smakov | CD | AKT | (Kazakhstan) Smakov | CD | AKT | | | |
| 2009 | not held | | | (Kazakhstan) Smakov | CD | AKT | | | |
| 2010 | (Kazakhstan) Zhumaskaliyev | FW | TOB | (Kazakhstan) Zhumaskaliyev | FW | TOB | | | |
| 2011 | (Kazakhstan) Konysbayev | FW | SHA | (Kazakhstan) Schmidtgal | FW | GRE | (Uzbekistan) Bakayev | FW | IRT |
| 2012 | (Kazakhstan) Nurdauletov | MF | AST | (Uzbekistan) Bakayev | FW | IRT | (Uzbekistan) Bakayev | FW | IRT |
| 2013 | (Kazakhstan) Finonchenko | FW | SHA | (Kazakhstan) Finonchenko | FW | SHA | (Kazakhstan) Finonchenko | FW | SHA |
| 2014 | (Kazakhstan) Islamkhan | FW | KRT | (Kazakhstan) Islamkhan | FW | KRT | (Kazakhstan) Islamkhan | FW | KRT |
| 2015 | (Ivory Coast) Gerard Gohou | FW | KRT | | | | (Ivory Coast) Gerard Gohou | FW | KRT |

== Monthly Awards ==
Web portal sports.kz holds "Almaz" monthly award for the best players since 2011 season.

| 2011 | Player | Pos | Club |
|---|---|---|---|
| MAR | (Kazakhstan) Khairullin | CM | AKT |
| APR | (Montenegro) Bogavac | FW | AST |
| MAY | (Kazakhstan) Khairullin | CM | AKT |
| JUN | (Uzbekistan) Bakayev | FW | IRT |
| JUL | (Senegal) Malick Mané | FW | AKT |
| AUG | (Uzbekistan) Bakayev | FW | IRT |
| SEP | (Kazakhstan) Zhumaskaliyev | FW | TOB |

| 2012 | Player | Pos | Club |
|---|---|---|---|
| MAR | (Kazakhstan) Dzholchiyev | FW | TOB |
| APR | (Kazakhstan) Dzholchiyev | FW | TOB |
| MAY | (Kazakhstan) Tazhimbetov | FW | ORD |
| JUN | (Uzbekistan) Bikmaev | FW | AKT |
| JUL | (Kazakhstan) Khairullin | CM | AKT |
| AUG | (Kyrgyzstan) Kenzhesariev | LB | AKT |
| SEP | (Uzbekistan) Bakayev | FW | IRT |

| 2013 | Player | Pos | Club |
|---|---|---|---|
| MAR | (Portugal) Manuel Curto | CM | TAR |
| APR | (Kazakhstan) Khairullin | CM | AKT |
| MAY | (Belarus) Zenkovich | FW | AKZ |
| JUN | (Uzbekistan) Kapadze | FW | AKT |
| JUL | (Kazakhstan) Mokin | GK | SHA |
| AUG | (Kazakhstan) Khizhnichenko | FW | SHA |
| SEP | (Kazakhstan) Finonchenko | FW | SHA |

| 2014 | Player | Pos | Club |
|---|---|---|---|
| MAR | (Uganda) Savio Nsereko | FW | ATY |
| APR | (Kazakhstan) Khairullin | CM | AKT |
| MAY | (The Gambia) Momodou Ceesay | FW | KRT |
| JUN | (Kazakhstan) Islamkhan | FW | KRT |
| JUL | (Central African Republic) Foxi Kéthévoama | FW | AST |
| AUG | (Kazakhstan) Islamkhan | FW | KRT |
| SEP | (Kazakhstan) Islamkhan | FW | KRT |

| 2015 | Player | Pos | Club |
|---|---|---|---|
| MAR | (Colombia) Roger Canas | CM | AST |
| APR | (Ivory Coast) Gerard Gohou | FW | KRT |
| MAY | (Ivory Coast) Gerard Gohou | FW | KRT |
| JUN | (Ivory Coast) Gerard Gohou | FW | KRT |
| JUL | (Kazakhstan) Islamkhan | FW | KRT |
| AUG | (Kazakhstan) Dzholchiyev | FW | AST |
| SEP | (Brazil) Isael | MF | KRT |
