= Oleg Voskoboynikov =

Kazakhstani footballer

Personal information
- Full name: Oleg Voskoboynikov
- Date of birth: 4 July 1971 (age 55)
- Place of birth: Almaty, Kazakh SSR
- Height: 1.79 m (5 ft 10 in)
- Position: Goalkeeper

Senior career*
Years	Team	Apps	(Gls)
1988	Meliorator Chimkent	0	(0)
1989	Khimik Jambul	1	(0)
1990	Montazhnik Turkestan	30	(0)
1991	Olimpia Alma-Ata	19	(0)
1992	Arsenal-SKIF	19	(0)
1993–1995	SKIF-Ordabasy	102	(0)
1996–1997	Taraz	55	(0)
1998–1999	Kaisar	36	(0)
1999	Sintez	17	(0)
2000	Zhenis Astana	18	(0)
2001–2002	Atyrau	60	(0)
2003	Aktobe-Lento	20	(0)
2004	Ordabasy	9	(0)
2006	Taraz	5	(0)
2007	Ordabasy	0	(0)

International career^{‡}
1994–2000	Kazakhstan	24	(0)
- * Club domestic league appearances and goals as of 08:19, 25 February 2021 (UTC) ‡ National team caps and goals as of 08:19, 25 February 2021 (UTC)

Oleg Voskoboynikov (born 4 July 1971) is a Kazakh former football player who played for the Kazakhstan national football team as a goalkeeper.

Voskoboynikov has made 24 appearances for the Kazakhstan national football team.

== Career statistics ==
=== International ===
As of match played 10 December 2000

Appearances and goals by national team and year
National team	Year	Apps	Goals
Kazakhstan	1994	2	0
Kazakhstan	1995	2	0
Kazakhstan	1996	1	0
Kazakhstan	1997	8	0
Kazakhstan	1998	5	0
Kazakhstan	1999	0	0
Kazakhstan	2000	6	0
Total		24	0

== Honours ==
- Kazakhstani Footballer of the Year (3):

- 1996, 1997, 1998
