= Yuri Novikov =

Kazakhstani footballer

Personal information
- Full name: Yuri Alekseyevich Novikov
- Date of birth: 19 May 1972
- Place of birth: Kazakh SSR
- Height: 1.83 m (6 ft 0 in)
- Position: Goalkeeper

Senior career*
Years	Team	Apps	(Gls)
1990	Traktor Pavlodar	10	(2)
1993–1994	Shakhter Karagandy	33	(43)
1995–1998	Irtysh Pavlodar	21	(20)
1999–2000	Shakhter Karagandy	53	(6)
2001–2006	Irtysh Pavlodar	151	(7)
2006	Shakhter Karagandy	15	(3)
2007	Zhetysu	24	(3)
Total		0	(0)

International career^{‡}
2001–2006	Kazakhstan	26	(2)

Managerial career
- 2008–2009: Tobol (coach)
- 2011: Taraz (coach)
- 2012: Kairat (coach)
- 2012–: Neftekhimik Nizhnekamsk (coach)
- * Club domestic league appearances and goals as of 2 October 2015 ‡ National team caps and goals as of 2 October 2015

Yuri Alekseyevich Novikov (Russian: Юрий Новиков; born 19 May 1972) is a former Kazakh football goalkeeper. He retired from football at the end of 2007. He is a goalkeeper coach at FC Tobol currently in the Kazakhstan Super League. He has also played for the Kazakhstan national football team, making his debut in 2001. Novikov started and spent most of his career in Pavlodar, Kazakhstan, where he played in local team "Irtysh" (formerly called "Traktor", "Ansat"). He made his debut in 1990. He also played for FC Shakhter Karagandy.

Novikov was named as the best goalkeeper in the Kazakhstan Super League for the seasons 2001, 2002, 2003 Moreover, Novikov was named Kazakhstani Footballer of the Year by journal GOAL in 2003.
