= Igor Avdeyev =

Kazakhstani footballer

Igor Avdeev
Personal information
- Full name: Igor Gennadyevich Avdeev
- Date of birth: 10 January 1973 (age 53)
- Place of birth: Dzhambul, Kazakh SSR
- Height: 1.81 m (5 ft 11 1/2 in)
- Positions: Full-back; wing-back

Senior career*
Years	Team	Apps	(Gls)
1991	Olimpia Almaty	1	(0)
1991–1993	Taraz	78	(15)
1994–1995	Rotor Volgograd	0	(0)
1996	Taraz	4	(2)
1996	Munaishy	10	(3)
1997	Alania Vladikavkaz	17	(0)
1998	Lokomotiv Nizhny Novgorod	18	(0)
1999–2001	Esil Bogatyr	66	(25)
2002–2004	Zhenis	53	(7)
2005–2006	Shakhter Karagandy	25	(0)
2007–2008	Kairat	29	(3)
2009	Lokomotiv Astana	11	(1)
Total		312	(56)

International career
1996–2005	Kazakhstan	27	(6)

Managerial career
- 2019: Taraz (assistant)
- * Club domestic league appearances and goals

Igor Gennadyevich Avdeev (Russian: Игорь Геннадьевич Авдеев; born 10 January 1973) is a Kazakhstani professional football coach and a former player.

== Career ==
=== Club ===
Avdeev played 3 games in the UEFA Cup 1996–97 for FC Alania Vladikavkaz.

=== International ===
Avdeev made 27 appearances for Kazakhstan national football team over a decade-long international career, and scored six goals.

== Career statistics ==
=== International ===
Kazakhstan national team
Year	Apps	Goals
1996	2	0
1997	0	0
1998	0	0
1999	0	0
2000	6	3
2001	6	3
2002	1	0
2003	2	0
2004	4	0
2005	6	0
Total	17	6

Statistics accurate as of match played 14 November 2017

=== International goals ===
As of 5 September 2017
Scores and results list Tajikistan's goal tally first.

#	Date	Venue	Opponent	Score	Result	Competition	Ref
1.	20 March 2000	Al Ahli Stadium, Manama, Bahrain	Bahrain	1–0	1–0	Friendly	
2.	31 March 2000	Grand Hamad Stadium, Doha, Qatar	Jordan	1–0	1–0	2000 AFC Asian Cup qualification	
3.	2 April 2000	Jassim bin Hamad Stadium, Doha, Qatar	Qatar		1–3	2000 AFC Asian Cup qualification	
4.	14 April 2001	Al-Shaab Stadium, Baghdad, Iraq	Macau	1–0	3–0	2002 FIFA World Cup qualification	
5.	23 April 2001	Central Stadium, Almaty, Kazakhstan	Macau	2–0	5–0	2002 FIFA World Cup qualification	
6.	23 April 2001	Central Stadium, Almaty, Kazakhstan	Macau	4–0	5–0	2002 FIFA World Cup qualification	

== Honours ==
- Kazakhstani Footballer of the Year: 1999, 2000.
