= Kuanysh Karakulov =

Kazakhstani professional footballer

Kuanysh Karakulov (Kazakh: Қуаныш Қарақұлов, Qýanysh Qaraqulov; 20 June 1977) is a Kazakhstani professional footballer who played as a midfielder for FC Atyrau and FC Ordabasy.

Karakulov was assistant to FC Ordabasy manager Viktor Pasulko, and briefly replaced Pasulko as caretaker manager in 2014.
