= Oleg Kapustnikov =

Kazakhstani footballer

Personal information
- Full name: Oleg Yuryevich Kapustnikov
- Date of birth: 5 May 1972 (age 54)
- Height: 1.65 m (5 ft 5 in)
- Position: Striker

Senior career*
Years	Team	Apps	(Gls)
1990	FC Meliorator Chimkent	9	(0)
1990–1991	FC Montazhnik Sayram	41	(15)
1992–1994	FC SKIF Ordabasy	87	(35)
1994–1995	FC Metalurh Zaporizhya	7	(0)
1995	FC KAMAZ-Chally Naberezhnye Chelny	5	(0)
1996	FC Taraz	16	(2)
2000	FC Dostyk Shymkent	11	(0)
2000–2001	FC Zvezda Irkutsk	30	(2)

International career
1992, 1994	Kazakhstan	7	(1)
- * Club domestic league appearances and goals

Oleg Yuryevich Kapustnikov (Russian: Олег Юрьевич Капустников; born 5 May 1972) is a retired Kazakhstani professional footballer. He made his professional debut in the Soviet Second League in 1990 for FC Meliorator Chimkent.
