= Roman Uzdenov =

Kazakh footballer (born 1979)

Personal information
- Full name: Roman Mukhadinovich Uzdenov
- Date of birth: 10 March 1979 (age 47)
- Place of birth: Nalchik, Russian SFSR
- Height: 1.88 m (6 ft 2 in)
- Position: Forward

Youth career
- Yesilj Kokchetav

Senior career*
Years	Team	Apps	(Gls)
1996–1997	PFC Spartak-d Nalchik	58	(9)
1998–1999	FC Nart Nartkala	38	(11)
2000	PFC Spartak Nalchik	24	(1)
2001	Zhenis Astana	28	(4)
2002	PFC Spartak Nalchik	28	(12)
2003–2005	FC Dynamo Moscow	0	(0)
2004	→ FC Khimki (loan)	13	(4)
2004	→ FC Anzhi Makhachkala (loan)	12	(4)
2005	→ FC Volgar-Gazprom Astrakhan (loan)	38	(13)
2006	FC Volgar-Gazprom Astrakhan	19	(5)
2007	PFC Spartak Nalchik	14	(1)
2008–2009	FC Atyrau	42	(12)
2010	FC Druzhba Maykop	29	(10)
Total		343	(85)

International career
2004–2008	Kazakhstan	5	(2)

Managerial career
- 2011–2014: Shakhter Karagandy (assistant)
- 2015: Ordabasy (assistant)
- 2018–2019: Atyrau (assistant)
- * Club domestic league appearances and goals

Roman Mukhadinovich Uzdenov (Russian: Роман Мухадинович Узденов; born 10 March 1979) is a Kazakh football coach and a former player. A forward, he scored two goals in five appearances for the Kazakhstan national team. He also holds Russian citizenship.

== Career statistics ==
#	Date	Venue	Opponent	Score	Result	Competition
1.	21 February 2004	Tsirion Stadium, Limassol, Cyprus	Cyprus	2–1	Loss	Friendly
2.	20 August 2008	Central Stadium, Almaty, Kazakhstan	Andorra	3–0	Win	2010 World Cup qual.
