= Murat Tleshev =

Kazakhstani footballer

Personal information
- Date of birth: 18 April 1980 (age 46)
- Place of birth: Taraz, Kazakh SSR, Soviet Union
- Height: 1.88 m (6 ft 2 in)
- Position: Forward

Youth career
- Taraz

Senior career*
Years	Team	Apps	(Gls)
1998–1999	Taraz	39	(9)
2000	Shakhter Karagandy	7	(2)
2000	Zhenis Astana	9	(1)
2001	Zhenis Astana	11	(3)
2001–2002	Shakhter Karagandy	29	(13)
2003–2005	Irtysh Pavlodar	87	(47)
2006	Astana	16	(7)
2007	Ordabasy	20	(6)
2008	Irtysh Pavlodar	25	(13)
2009–2010	Aktobe	51	(30)
2011	Irtysh Pavlodar	16	(2)
2012	Aktobe	2	(0)
2012–2013	Zhetysu	27	(7)
2014	Taraz	24	(7)
2015	Atyrau	19	(1)
2016	Aktobe	6	(0)
Total		388	(148)

International career
2004–2007	Kazakhstan	8	(1)
- * Club domestic league appearances and goals

Murat Tleshev (Kazakh: Мұрат Тлешев; born 18 April 1980) is a Kazakh former professional footballer who played as a forward. He scored more than 100 goals in 350 matches in the Kazakhstan Premier League. He made eight appearances scoring one goal for the Kazakh national team.

== Career statistics ==
=== Club ===
Appearances and goals by club, season and competition
Club	Season	League			National cup		Continental		Other		Total	
Club	Season	Division	Apps	Goals	Apps	Goals	Apps	Goals	Apps	Goals	Apps	Goals
Taraz	1998	Kazakhstan Premier League	18	3			–		–		18	3
Taraz	1999	Kazakhstan Premier League	21	6			–		–		21	6
Taraz	Total		39	9			0	0	0	0	39	9
Shakhter Karagandy	2000	Kazakhstan Premier League	7	2			–		–		7	2
Zhenis Astana	2000	Kazakhstan Premier League	9	1			–		–		9	1
Zhenis Astana	2001	Kazakhstan Premier League	11	3			–		–		11	3
Zhenis Astana	Total		20	4			0	0	0	0	20	4
Shakhter Karagandy	2001	Kazakhstan Premier League	6	0			–		–		6	0
Shakhter Karagandy	2002	Kazakhstan Premier League	23	13			–		–		23	13
Shakhter Karagandy	Total		29	13			0	0	0	0	29	13
Irtysh Pavlodar	2003	Kazakhstan Premier League	22	10			2 (Note: Appearances and goals in the UEFA Champions League)	0	–		8	0
Irtysh Pavlodar	2004	Kazakhstan Premier League	30	12			–		–		23	13
Irtysh Pavlodar	2005	Kazakhstan Premier League	23	20			–		–		23	13
Irtysh Pavlodar	2006	Kazakhstan Premier League	12	5			–"|–		–		23	13
Irtysh Pavlodar	Total		87	47			2	0	0	0	89	47
Astana	2006	Kazakhstan Premier League	16	7			–		–		16	7
Ordabasy	2007	Kazakhstan Premier League	20	6			–		–		20	6
Irtysh Pavlodar	2008	Kazakhstan Premier League	25	13			–		–		25	13
Aktobe	2009	Kazakhstan Premier League	25	20			6 (Note: Four appearances and two goals in the UEFA Champions League, two appearances in the UEFA Europa League)	2	–		29	22
Aktobe	2010	Kazakhstan Premier League	26	10			6 (Note: Four appearances and two goals in the UEFA Champions League, two appearances and two goals in the UEFA Europa League)	4	–		26	10
Aktobe	Total		51	30			12	6	0	0	63	36
Irtysh Pavlodar	2011	Kazakhstan Premier League	16	2			3 (Note: Appearances and goals in the UEFA Europa League)	0	–		19	2
Aktobe	2012	Kazakhstan Premier League	2	0			0	0	–		2	0
Zhetysu	2012	Kazakhstan Premier League	10	3			0	0	–		10	3
Zhetysu	2013	Kazakhstan Premier League	17	4			–		–		17	4
Zhetysu	Total		27	7			0	0	0	0	27	7
Taraz	2014	Kazakhstan Premier League	24	7			–		–		24	7
Atyrau	2015	Kazakhstan Premier League	19	1			–		–		19	1
Aktobe	2016	Kazakhstan Premier League	6	0				0	–		6	0
Career total			388	148			17	6	0	0	399	154

=== International ===
As of match played 19 November 2019

Appearances and goals by national team and year
National team	Year	Apps	Goals
Kazakhstan	2004	1	0
Kazakhstan	2005	0	0
Kazakhstan	2006	4	1
Kazakhstan	2007	3	0
Total		8	1

Scores and results list Kazakhstan's goal tally first, score column indicates score after each Tleshev goal.

List of international goals scored by Murat Tleshev
No.	Date	Venue	Opponent	Score	Result	Competition	Ref.
1	2 July 2006	Central Stadium, Almaty, Kazakhstan	Tajikistan	4–1	4–1	Friendly	

== Honours ==
Zhenis Astana/Astana

- Kazakhstan Premier League: 2000, 2001, 2006
- Kazakhstan Cup: 2000–01

Irtysh Pavlodar

- Kazakhstan Premier League: 2003

Aktobe

- Kazakhstan Premier League: 2009

Individual

- Kazakhstan League Topscorer top-goalscorer: 2005, 2008, 2009
