= Yevgeniy Lunyov =

Kazakhstani footballer

Personal information
- Full name: Yevgeniy Anatolyevich Lunyov
- Date of birth: 26 April 1976 (age 50)
- Place of birth: Soviet Union
- Height: 1.86 m (6 ft 1 in)
- Position: Forward

Team information
- Current team: Shakhter

Senior career*
Years	Team	Apps	(Gls)
1994	Batyr	2	(0)
1996–1997	Shakhter	30	(1)
1997	Bolat	11	(1)
1998	Shakhter	25	(4)
1999	Irtysh	25	(8)
2000–2002	Shakhter	85	(30)
2003–2004	Zhenis	42	(10)
2005–2006	Shakhter	39	(1)
2007	Ekibastuzets	22	(5)
2008	Energetik Pavlodar	6	(0)
2008	Kairat	10	(2)
2009–	Shakhter		

International career
2000–2004	Kazakhstan	12	(3)
- * Club domestic league appearances and goals

Yevgeniy Lunyov (Russian: Евгений Анатольевич Лунёв; born 26 April 1976) is a Kazakhstani football forward.

He has played most of his career for the club FC Shakhter Karagandy, with spells at FC Irtysh Pavlodar, FC Zhenis Astana and FC Kairat.

Lunyov made 12 appearances and scored 3 goals for the Kazakhstan national football team from 2000 to 2004.

== Career statistics ==
=== International goals ===
#	Date	Venue	Opponent	Score	Result	Competition
1.	12 April 2001	Al-Shaab, Baghdad, Iraq	Nepal	0–6	Win	2002 FIFA World Cup qual.
2.	27 April 2003	Svangaskarð, Toftir, Faroe Islands	Faroe Islands	3–2	Loss	Friendly
3.	28 April 2004	Central Stadium, Almaty, Kazakhstan	Azerbaijan	2–3	Loss	Friendly
Correct as of 13 January 2017
