= Kairat Aubakirov =

Kazakhstani footballer

Personal information
- Date of birth: 8 March 1971 (age 55)
- Place of birth: Kazakh SSR
- Height: 1.80 m (5 ft 11 in)
- Position: Striker

Senior career*
| Years | Team | Apps | (Gls) |
| 1989–1991 | FC Spartak Semipalatinsk | | |
| 1992 | FC Shakhter Karagandy | | |
| 1993 | FC Kairat | | |
| 1994–1998 | FC Yelimay | | |
| 1999 | FC Shakhter Karagandy | | |
| 2000–2001 | FC Yelimay | 54 | (28) |
| 2002 | FC Vostok | 11 | (0) |
| 2003 | FC Taraz | 10 | (1) |

International career
| 1992–1996 | Kazakhstan | 9 | (1) |
- * Club domestic league appearances and goals

Kairat Aubakirov (born 8 March 1971) is a retired Kazakh professional football player. He played for FC Shakhter Karagandy, FC Kairat, and FC Yelimay in the Kazakhstan Premier League, appearing in over 300 league matches, scoring almost 100 goals.

Aubakirov made nine appearances for the Kazakhstan national football team, scoring once.

== Career statistics ==
=== International goals ===
Scores and results list. Kazakhstan's goal tally first.

| # | Date | Venue | Opponent | Score | Result | Competition |
|---|---|---|---|---|---|---|
| 1. | 26 September 1992 | Spartak Stadium, Bishkek, Kyrgyzstan | Kyrgyzstan | 1–0 | 1–1 | Friendly |
