= Yuri Aksenov =

Soviet and Russian footballer

Personal information
- Full name: Yuri Aleksandrovich Aksenov
- Date of birth: 11 August 1973 (age 53)
- Place of birth: Volgograd, Russian SFSR
- Height: 1.74 m (5 ft 8 1/2 in)
- Position: Midfielder

Senior career*
Years	Team	Apps	(Gls)
1990	Tekstilshchik Kamyshin	2	(0)
1991–1992	Dynamo Kyiv	0	(0)
1992	→ Dynamo-2 Kyiv	3	(0)
1992–1994	Rotor Volgograd	0	(0)
1992–1994	→ Rotor-d Volgograd	62	(16)
1995–1996	Torpedo Volzhsky	71	(8)
1997	Energiya Kamyshin	17	(0)
1997–1999	Uralan Elista	62	(9)
2000–2001	Zhenis	53	(19)
2002	Uralan Elista	6	(0)
2002	Kristall Smolensk	10	(1)
2003	Zhenis	23	(6)
2004–2005	Kairat	32	(3)
2006–2008	Vostok	79	(16)

International career
2003–2004	Kazakhstan	5	(1)
- * Club domestic league appearances and goals

Yuri Aleksandrovich Aksenov (Russian: Юрий Александрович Аксёнов; born 11 August 1973) is a former Kazakhstani professional footballer.

== Career ==
He made his professional debut in the Soviet Second League in 1990 for FC Tekstilshchik Kamyshin. He played for the main squad of FC Rotor Volgograd in the Russian Cup.

== Honours ==
- Russian Cup finalist: 1995.
- Kazakhstan Premier League champion: 2000, 2001.
