= Daniyar Mukanov =

Kazakhstani footballer

Personal information
- Full name: Daniyar Mukanov
- Date of birth: 26 September 1976 (age 50)
- Height: 1.79 m (5 ft 10 1/2 in)
- Position: Defender

Senior career*
Years	Team	Apps	(Gls)
1992–1993	Spartak Semey	40	(1)
1994–1995	Yelimay Semey	13	(1)
1996	Kainar	8	(2)
1996–2000	Yelimay Semey	72	(4)
2001–2002	Vostok Altyn	38	(4)
2002–2010	Tobol	213	(8)
2011	Aktobe	0	(0)
2011	Atyrau	12	(1)
2012	Zhetysu	20	(0)
2013	Tobol	5	(0)

International career^{‡}
2002–2006	Kazakhstan	12	(1)
- * Club domestic league appearances and goals as of 6 May 2015 ‡ National team caps and goals as of 6 May 2015

Daniyar Mukanov (Kazakh: Данияр Мұқанов) (born 16 September 1978) is a retired Kazakhstani football defender.

== Career statistics ==
=== International ===
Kazakhstan national team
Year	Apps	Goals
2002	1	0
2003	3	1
2004	3	0
2005	2	0
2006	3	0
Total	12	1
