= Dmitry Byakov =

Kazakhstani footballer

Dmitriy Byakov
Personal information
- Full name: Dmitriy Nikolayevich Byakov
- Date of birth: 9 April 1978 (age 48)
- Place of birth: Soviet Union, Kazakh SSR
- Height: 1.76 m (5 ft 9 in)
- Position: Attacking midfielder

Team information
- Current team: FC Zhetysu
- Number: 11

Senior career*
Years	Team	Apps	(Gls)
1998–1999	CSKA Kairat Almaty	41	(5)
2000	FC Kairat Almaty	5	(0)
2001	FC Anzhi Makhachkala	0	(0)
2001–2002	FC Kairat Almaty	45	(14)
2003–2004	FC Aktobe	0	(0)
2005	FC Shakhter	19	(2)
2006	Astana	21	(7)
2007	FC Almaty	19	(2)
2008	Astana	10	(0)
2008	FC Shakhter	6	(1)
2009	FC Zhetysu	0	(0)
Total		166	(31)

International career^{‡}
2000–2008	Kazakhstan	33	(8)
- * Club domestic league appearances and goals as of 15 March 2008 ‡ National team caps and goals as of 14 September 2008

Dmitriy Nikolayevich Byakov (Russian: Дмитрий Бяков; born 9 April 1978) is a Kazakh football attacking midfielder. He plays for FC Zhetysu. Byakov also plays for the Kazakhstan national football team. His first name is also sometimes translated as Dmitry or Dmitri.

== Club career ==
Dmitriy Byakov's club career started in the year 1998 with the CSKA Kairat Almaty club.

== Incident ==
On 9 April 2003, on his 25th birthday, Dmitriy was stabbed in the heart after a brawl in a nightclub in Almaty. He returned to professional level football after two years of recovery.

== International career ==
Dmitriy first played for the Kazakhstan national football team in 2000. He was Kazakhstan's top scorer in UEFA Euro 2008 qualifying, scoring 5 goals against Azerbaijan, Finland, Belgium, Poland and Portugal, three of which were away goals.

== Career statistics ==
=== International goals ===
#	Date	Venue	Opponent	Score	Result	Competition
1.	23 April 2001	Central Stadium, Almaty, Kazakhstan	Macau	5–0	Win	2002 FIFA World Cup qual.
2.	23 April 2001	Central Stadium, Almaty, Kazakhstan	Macau	5–0	Win	2002 FIFA World Cup qual.
3.	6 September 2006	Tofiq Bahramov Republican Stadium, Baku, Azerbaijan	Azerbaijan	1–1	Draw	Euro 2008 qualifier
4.	7 March 2007	Kazhymukan Munaitpasov Stadium, Shymkent, Kazakhstan	Kyrgyzstan	2–0	Win	Friendly
5.	22 August 2007	Ratina Stadium, Tampere, Finland	Finland	2–1	Loss	Euro 2008 qualifier
6.	12 September 2007	Central Stadium, Almaty, Kazakhstan	Belgium	2–2	Draw	Euro 2008 qualifier
7.	13 October 2007	Polish Army Stadium, Warsaw, Poland	Poland	3–1	Loss	Euro 2008 qualifier
8.	17 October 2007	Central Stadium, Almaty, Kazakhstan	Portugal	1–2	Loss	Euro 2008 qualifier
Correct as of 13 January 2017
