= List of FC Astana records and statistics =

FC Astana is a Kazakh professional football club based in Astana.

This list encompasses the major records set by the club and their players in the Kazakhstan Premier League. The player records section includes details of the club's goalscorers and those who have made more than 50 appearances in first-team competitions.

== Player ==
As of match played 31 October 2026

- Players who represented their country during their time with Lokomotiv Astana/Astana are denoted in **Bold**, caps earnt after leaving aren't denoted.
- Players who only represented Astana whilst on loan from another club are denoted in Italic.

=== 100 or more appearances ===
	Name	Years	League apps	League goals	Cup apps	Cup goals	League Cup apps	League goals	Super Cup apps	Super Cup goals	Europe apps	Europe goals	Total apps	Total goals	International Career
1	(Kazakhstan) **Abzal Beysebekov**	2009, 2012–Present	341	15	38	1	4	0	10	0	79	4	472	20	Kazakhstan
2	(Croatia) Marin Tomasov	2017–2018, 2018–Present	236	106	13	3	4	1	6	3	69	20	328	133	Croatia
3	(Kazakhstan) **Nenad Erić**	2011–2020	227	0	16	0	-	-	7	0	68	0	318	0	Kazakhstan (Note: Erić was born in Požega, SFR Yugoslavia, becoming a Kazakhstani citizen in 2014, making his debut for Kazakhstan in February 2015.)
4	(Kazakhstan) **Dmitry Shomko**	2011, 2011–2020; 2025–present	219	8	10	0	-	-	7	0	70	5	306	13	Kazakhstan
5	(Kazakhstan) **Yevgeny Postnikov**	2014–2021	150	2	10	0	-	-	6	0	57	3	223	5	Kazakhstan (Note: Postnikov was born in Stary Oskol, Russian SFSR, but qualified to represent Kazakhstan, making his debut for Kazakhstan in March 2018.)
6	(Bosnia and Herzegovina) **Marin Aničić**	2014–2019	148	5	7	0	-	-	5	0	52	6	212	11	Bosnia and Herzegovina
7	(Kazakhstan) **Tanat Nuserbayev**	2011–2016	152	36	18	5	-	-	3	0	24	3	197	44	Kazakhstan
8	(Kazakhstan) **Serikzhan Muzhikov**	2014, 2015–2019	122	16	10	1	-	-	3	0	54	2	189	19	Kazakhstan
9	(Belarus) **Max Ebong**	2020–2025	126	10	13	1	3	0	4	0	32	0	178	11	Belarus
10	(Ghana) **Patrick Twumasi**	2014, 2015–2018	123	48	9	6	-	-	4	0	35	15	171	69	Ghana
11	(Kazakhstan) **Roman Murtazayev**	2016–2019, 2021	110	25	3	0	-	-	4	0	35	5	152	30	Kazakhstan
12	(Kazakhstan) **Marat Shakhmetov**	2009–2014	131	6	17	0	-	-	1	0	2	0	151	6	Kazakhstan
13	(Central African Republic) **Foxi Kéthévoama**	2012, 2013–2015	109	26	13	5	-	-	2	1	22	2	146	34	Central African Republic
14	(Belarus) **Ivan Mayewski**	2017–2020	96	6	0	0	-	-	4	1	44	1	144	8	Belarus (Note: Mayewski was born in Magdeburg, East Germany, but qualified to represent Belarus, making his debut for Belarus in March 2015.)
15	(Kazakhstan) **Yury Logvinenko**	2016–2021	99	11	4	0	-	-	3	0	36	4	142	15	Kazakhstan
16	(Kazakhstan) **Islambek Kuat**	2010–2014, 2021–2024	91	4	15	0	5	0	1	0	21	0	133	5	Kazakhstan
17	(Kazakhstan) **Kayrat Nurdauletov**	2010–2014	111	7	12	1	-	-	2	0	3	0	128	8	Kazakhstan
17	(Democratic Republic of the Congo) **Junior Kabananga**	2015–2018, 2018–2019	77	31	5	3	-	-	2	2	44	6	128	42	DR Congo
17	(Kazakhstan) Stanislav Basmanov	2018–Present	93	13	23	1	4	1	0	0	8	0	128	15	Kazakhstan
20	(Colombia) Roger Cañas	2014–2017	91	12	6	1	-	-	2	0	28	3	127	16	Colombia U20
21	(Kazakhstan) **Yan Vorogovsky**	2023–Present	72	4	4	0	3	0	0	0	28	0	107	4	Kazakhstan
21	(Kazakhstan) **Ramazan Karimov**	2018–2022, 2025–present	79	11	7	2	5	0	0	0	16	2	107	15	Kazakhstan
23	(Serbia) **Antonio Rukavina**	2018–2021	67	0	3	0	-	-	3	0	32	0	105	0	Serbia
23	(North Macedonia) Aleksa Amanović	2023–2026	68	3	9	0	4	0	1	1	23	0	105	4	Macedonia U21 (Note: Amanović was born in Belgrade, SFR Yugoslavia, but qualified to represent Macedonia, making his debut for Macedonia U21 in 2014.)
25	(Kazakhstan) **Aleksey Shchyotkin**	2015–2020	76	17	6	1	-	-	4	0	15	0	101	18	Kazakhstan

=== 25–99 appearances ===
	Name	Years	League apps	League goals	Cup apps	Cup goals	League Cup apps	League goals	Super Cup apps	Super Cup goals	Europe apps	Europe goals	Total apps	Total goals	International Career
26	(Kazakhstan) **Mikhail Rozhkov**	2010–2012	82	7	14	3	-	-	1	0	-	-	97	10	Kazakhstan (Note: Rozhkov was born in Moscow, Russian SFSR, but qualified to represent Kazakhstan, making his debut for Kazakhstan in March 2010.)
27	(Kazakhstan) **Sergei Ostapenko**	2010, 2012–2014, 2015	82	16	13	2	-	-	1	1	0	0	96	19	Kazakhstan
27	(Kazakhstan) **Viktor Dmitrenko**	2012–2014	75	4	12	0	-	-	1	0	8	0	96	4	Kazakhstan (Note: Dmitrenko was born in Primorsko-Akhtarsk, Russian SFSR, but qualified to represent Kazakhstan, making his debut for Kazakhstan in September 2012.)
29	(Kazakhstan) **Ulan Konysbayev**	2011–2013, 2015	78	8	11	1	-	-	3	0	2	0	94	9	Kazakhstan
30	(Kazakhstan) **Abat Aymbetov**	2021, 2022–2024	58	23	14	4	-	-	1	0	18	2	91	29	Kazakhstan
30	(Croatia) Josip Čondrić	2023–Present	57	0	3	0	3	0	1	0	27	0	91	0	-
32	(Croatia) Karlo Bartolec	2024–Present	64	6	3	0	3	2	-	-	16	0	86	8	Croatia
33	(Serbia) **Nemanja Maksimović**	2015–2017	54	9	4	0	-	-	2	0	21	3	81	12	Serbia
34	(Montenegro) **Žarko Tomašević**	2019–2022, 2023	50	5	7	2	-	-	3	1	20	1	80	9	Montenegro
35	(Kazakhstan) **Mark Gurman**	2010–2011, 2016	61	1	14	0	-	-	2	0	2	0	79	1	Kazakhstan
36	(Serbia) Đorđe Despotović	2016–2018	53	14	4	3	-	-	2	0	19	3	78	20	Serbia U21
36	(Lithuania) **Kipras Kažukolovas**	2024–Present	55	1	2	0	5	0	-	-	16	2	78	3	Lithuania
38	(Montenegro) Damir Kojašević	2012–2015	61	12	10	5	-	-	1	0	5	0	77	17	-
38	(Croatia) Branimir Kalaica	2024–Present	56	4	3	0	4	0	-	-	14	1	77	5	Croatia U23
40	(Croatia) Luka Šimunović	2019–2021	51	0	8	0	-	-	2	0	15	0	76	0	(Note: Šimunović was born in Livno, Bosnia and Herzegovina, but gained Croatian citizenship.)
41	(Kazakhstan) Elkhan Astanov	2023–Present	47	6	8	2	5	1	0	0	15	1	75	10	Kazakhstan
42	(Kazakhstan) **Bauyrzhan Dzholchiyev**	2014–2015	50	9	5	1	-	-	1	0	17	5	73	15	Kazakhstan (Note: Dzholchiyev was born in Frunze, Kyrgyz SSR, but qualified to represent Kazakhstan, making his debut for Kazakhstan in June 2012.)
43	(Belarus) **Igor Shitov**	2016–2018	41	1	4	0	-	-	1	0	25	0	71	1	Belarus
43	(Kazakhstan) **Yury Pertsukh**	2018–2023	53	4	6	2	-	-	4	0	8	0	71	6	Kazakhstan
43	(Kazakhstan) **Aleksandr Marochkin**	2023–2025	40	1	3	1	5	0	0	0	23	1	71	3	Kazakhstan
43	(Guinea) **Ousmane Camara**	2024–2025	49	13	3	0	5	1	-	-	14	2	71	16	Guinea
47	(Kazakhstan) **Georgy Zhukov**	2014–2015	39	2	7	0	-	-	1	0	19	0	66	2	Kazakhstan
48	(Moldova) **Igor Bugaiov**	2010–2011	57	18	6	6	-	-	1	2	-	-	64	26	Moldova
48	(Curaçao) **Rangelo Janga**	2018–2022	40	10	1	0	-	-	1	0	22	1	64	11	Curaçao (Note: Janga was born in Rotterdam, Netherlands, but qualified to represent Curaçao, making his debut for Curaçao in March 2016.)
48	(Romania) **Dorin Rotariu**	2019–2021	45	8	1	0	-	-	2	0	16	2	64	10	Romania
48	(Armenia) **Kamo Hovhannisyan**	2022–2023	42	0	7	0	-	-	1	0	14	2	64	2	Armenia
52	(Kazakhstan) **Timur Dosmagambetov**	2022–2025	30	7	12	0	5	0	1	0	15	0	63	7	Kazakhstan
53	(Kazakhstan) **Aleksandr Kirov**	2010–2011, 2013	54	3	5	0	-	-	2	0	0	0	61	3	Kazakhstan
53	(Kazakhstan) Vladislav Prokopenko	2017–2024	39	1	20	4	-	-	1	0	1	0	61	5	Kazakhstan U21
55	(Ukraine) Roman Pakholyuk	2009–2011, 2011	55	7	5	0	-	-	-	-	-	-	60	7	Ukraine U21
56	(Kazakhstan) **Maksim Azovsky**	2010–2011	52	0	6	0	-	-	1	0	-	-	59	0	Kazakhstan
57	(Kazakhstan) Aleksandr Mokin	2016–2018, 2019	44	0	6	0	-	-	0	0	7	0	57	0	Kazakhstan
57	(Armenia) **Tigran Barseghyan**	2020–2021	43	10	5	2	-	-	3	1	6	2	57	15	Armenia
59	(Hungary) **László Kleinheisler**	2017–2018, 2018–2019	32	0	0	0	-	-	1	0	21	2	54	2	Hungary
59	(Kazakhstan) **Aleksandr Zarutskiy**	2021–2024	33	0	17	0	-	-	1	0	3	0	54	0	Kazakhstan U21
59	(Nigeria) Geoffrey Chinedu	2024–2026	36	18	1	0	3	3	-	-	14	6	54	27	-
62	(Kazakhstan) Damir Dautov	2009–2012	45	2	7	0	-	-	1	0	-	-	53	2	-
62	(Albania) Nazmi Gripshi	2024–2026	38	22	0	0	2	1	-	-	13	2	53	25	Albania U21
64	(Kazakhstan) Maksim Samchenko	2009–2010	44	0	6	0	-	-	-	-	-	-	50	0	Kazakhstan
64	(Kazakhstan) **Valery Korobkin**	2012–2013	39	3	8	0	-	-	1	0	2	0	50	3	Kazakhstan (Note: Korobkin was born in Volgograd, Russian SFSR, but qualified to represent Kazakhstan, making his debut for Kazakhstan in October 2012.)
64	(Kazakhstan) Yeldos Akhmetov	2013–2015	38	1	7	0	-	-	0	0	5	0	50	1	Kazakhstan
64	(Kazakhstan) **Aslan Darabayev**	2022–2023	38	3	9	0	-	-	0	0	3	0	50	3	Kazakhstan
64	(Kazakhstan) Sultan Sagnaev	2016–2023	33	1	16	1	-	-	0	0	1	0	50	2	Kazakhstan U21
64	(France) Fabien Ourega	2023–2024	30	1	6	0	1	0	1	0	12	0	50	1	-
70	(Kazakhstan) **Askhat Tagybergen**	2016–2018	35	4	3	2	-	-	0	0	11	0	49	6	Kazakhstan
71	(Kazakhstan) **Serhiy Malyi**	2016–2020	30	2	3	1	-	-	1	0	13	0	47	3	Kazakhstan (Note: Malyi was born in Luhansk, Ukrainian SSR, becoming a Kazakhstani citizen before making his debut for Kazakhstan in March 2014.)
72	(Armenia) **Varazdat Haroyan**	2021, 2023–2024	33	2	4	0	-	-	2	0	5	0	44	2	Armenia
72	(Portugal) Pedro Eugénio	2021–2023	29	18	9	6	-	-	0	0	6	0	44	26	Portugal U17
72	(Kazakhstan) Nurali Zhaksylykov	2023–Present	29	4	8	0	1	0	0	0	6	0	44	4	Kazakhstan U21
72	(Kazakhstan) **Mukhammedzhan Seysen**	2024–Present	34	0	2	0	3	0	-	-	5	0	44	0	Kazakhstan
76	(The Gambia) Dembo Darboe	2023	21	5	6	3	-	-	1	1	14	2	42	11	Gambia
77	(Kazakhstan) **Zhambyl Kukeyev**	2009–2010	39	5	2	0	-	-	-	-	-	-	41	5	Kazakhstan
77	(Kazakhstan) Didar Zhalmukan	2017–2021	37	7	2	0	-	-	1	0	1	0	41	7	Kazakhstan U21
79	(Iceland) **Rúnar Már Sigurjónsson**	2019–2021	26	8	0	0	-	-	1	0	13	5	40	13	Iceland
79	(Kazakhstan) Bauyrzhan Islamkhan	2013, 2025–present	36	4	1	0	-	-	0	0	3	1	40	5	Kazakhstan
81	(Bosnia and Herzegovina) Ivan Bašić	2025–Present	33	4	0	0	-	-	-	-	6	2	39	6	Bosnia and Herzegovina
82	(Kazakhstan) Piraliy Aliev	2011–2012	34	1	4	0	-	-	0	0	-	-	38	1	Kazakhstan
83	(Kazakhstan) Igor Pikalkin	2013–2014	25	0	6	0	-	-	0	0	5	0	36	0	Kazakhstan U21
83	(Bosnia and Herzegovina) Srđan Grahovac	2017, 2018–2019	26	8	0	0	-	-	0	0	10	0	36	8	Bosnia and Herzegovina
85	(Kazakhstan) **Andrey Karpovich**	2009, 2011	32	2	2	0	-	-	1	0	-	-	35	2	Kazakhstan
85	(North Macedonia) Bobi Bozhinovski	2010–2011	30	1	5	0	-	-	-	-	-	-	35	1	Macedonia U21
85	(Kazakhstan) **Bakhtiyar Zaynutdinov**	2018–2019	27	5	0	0	-	-	0	0	8	1	35	6	Kazakhstan
85	(Nigeria) Nnamdi Ahanonu	2024–Present	20	1	2	0	5	2	-	-	8	0	35	3	-
89	(Kazakhstan) **Dmytro Nepohodov**	2019–2021	24	0	3	0	-	-	2	0	5	0	34	0	Kazakhstan (Note: Nepohodov was born in Kyiv, Ukrainian SSR, becoming a Kazakhstani citizen before making his debut for Kazakhstan in November 2018.)
89	(Moldova) Valeriu Ciupercă	2021–2022	24	4	4	0	-	-	2	0	4	0	34	4	Moldova (Note: After representing Moldova in once in 2011, Ciupercă renounced his Moldovan Citizenship in order to not be considered a Legionnaire in the Russian League.)
89	(Serbia) Dušan Jovančić	2023–2025	17	0	6	0	-	-	1	0	10	0	34	0	-
92	(Kazakhstan) **Nurbol Zhumaskaliyev**	2011	31	10	1	0	-	-	1	0	-	-	33	10	Kazakhstan
93	(Moldova) **Valeriu Andronic**	2010	28	7	4	1	-	-	-	-	-	-	32	8	Moldova
93	(Brazil) Zelão	2013	28	3	1	0	-	-	1	0	2	0	32	3	-
93	(Bulgaria) Atanas Kurdov	2014–2015	25	6	2	0	-	-	-	-	5	1	32	7	Bulgaria U21
93	(Kazakhstan) Dinmukhamed Karaman	2026–Present	29	0	1	0	0	0	-	-	2	0	32	0	Kazakhstan
97	(North Macedonia) Dimitrija Lazarevski	2012–2013	26	0	5	0	-	-	-	-	-	-	31	0	Macedonia U21
98	(Kazakhstan) Sergey Khizhnichenko	2010, 2019	25	6	1	0	-	-	0	0	4	0	30	6	Kazakhstan
98	(Spain) Cadete	2021	21	0	7	0	-	-	0	0	2	0	30	0	-
98	(Kazakhstan) **Marat Bystrov**	2018–2020, 2023–2025	19	0	3	0	4	0	-	-	4	0	30	0	Kazakhstan
101	(Kazakhstan) Maksat Abrayev	2026–Present	26	3	1	0	0	0	-	-	2	0	29	3	-
102	(Russia) Andrey Tikhonov	2009	25	12	3	0	-	-	-	-	-	-	28	12	Russia
102	(Montenegro) Dragan Bogavac	2011	26	12	1	0	-	-	1	0	-	-	28	12	Kazakhstan
102	(North Macedonia) Filip Ivanovski	2012–2013	20	4	7	1	-	-	1	0	0	0	28	5	North Macedonia
102	(Ukraine) Danylo Beskorovaynyi	2022	20	0	6	0	-	-	-	-	2	0	28	0	Ukraine U20
106	(Russia) Yegor Titov	2009	24	6	3	0	-	-	-	-	-	-	27	6	Russia
106	(Kazakhstan) Vladimir Loginovsky	2013–2017	20	0	4	0	-	-	0	0	3	0	27	0	Kazakhstan
108	(Kazakhstan) **Renat Abdulin**	2009–2010	24	1	2	0	-	-	-	-	-	-	26	1	Kazakhstan
108	(Kazakhstan) Talgat Kusyapov	2016–2024	17	1	7	1	-	-	0	0	2	0	26	2	Kazakhstan U21
108	(Brazil) Bryan Garcia	2022	18	0	6	0	-	-	-	-	2	0	26	0	-
111	(Ghana) Barnes Osei	2024	14	0	1	0	4	0	-	-	6	0	25	0	Ghana U20

=== 1–24 appearances ===
	Name	Years	League apps	League goals	Cup apps	Cup goals	League Cup apps	League goals	Super Cup apps	Super Cup goals	Europe apps	Europe goals	Total apps	Total goals	International Career
112	(Russia) Roman Gerus	2009–2010	23	0	1	0	-	-	-	-	-	-	24	0	-
112	(Belarus) Denis Polyakov	2022	18	1	4	0	-	-	-	-	2	0	24	1	Belarus
112	(France) Jérémy Manzorro	2022–2023	19	0	3	3	-	-	-	-	2	0	24	3	-
115	(Kazakhstan) **Mikhail Gabyshev**	2022–2024	11	1	7	0	-	-	0	0	5	0	23	1	Kazakhstan
116	(Russia) Zaurbek Pliyev	2011	21	1	1	0	-	-	0	0	-	-	22	1	Russia U21
116	(Kazakhstan) Sagi Sovet	2019–2024	12	0	8	0	-	-	2	0	0	0	22	0	Kazakhstan U21
116	(Kazakhstan) Alibek Kasym	2026–Present	22	2	0	0	0	0	-	-	0	0	22	2	Kazakhstan
119	(Serbia) Marko Mitrović	2009	18	0	3	0	-	-	-	-	-	-	21	0	Yugoslavia U18
119	(Guinea-Bissau) **Cícero Semedo**	2013–2014	20	7	1	1	-	-	0	0	0	0	21	8	Guinea-Bissau (Note: Semedo was born in Seia, Portugal, but qualified to represent Guinea-Bissau, making his debut for Guinea-Bissau in October 2010.)
119	(Slovenia) **Branko Ilić**	2015	9	0	0	0	-	-	0	0	12	0	21	0	Slovenia
122	(Kazakhstan) **Maksat Bayzhanov**	2009	19	0	1	0	-	-	-	-	-	-	20	0	Kazakhstan
122	(Kazakhstan) Ruslan Sakhalbaev	2009	18	1	2	1	-	-	-	-	-	-	20	2	-
124	(Nigeria) Patrick Ovie	2009	17	1	2	0	-	-	-	-	-	-	19	1	-
124	(Russia) Aleksei Belkin	2010–2012	14	0	4	0	-	-	1	0	-	-	19	0	-
124	(Albania) Azdren Llullaku	2017	17	1	1	0	-	-	1	0	0	0	19	1	Albania
124	(Brazil) Pedro Henrique	2018	8	0	0	0	-	-	0	0	11	3	19	3	-
124	(Azerbaijan) Richard Almeida	2018–2019	8	1	0	0	-	-	0	0	11	0	19	1	Azerbaijan (Note: Almeida was born in São Paulo, Brazil, becoming an Azerbaijani citizen in 2017 and making his debut for Azerbaijan in June 2010.)
124	(Netherlands) Rai Vloet	2022	14	5	3	2	-	-	-	-	2	0	19	7	Netherlands U21
124	(Serbia) Marko Milošević	2022	15	0	3	0	-	-	-	-	1	0	19	0	-
131	(Kazakhstan) Roman Nesterenko	2009	15	0	3	0	-	-	-	-	-	-	18	0	-
131	(Cameroon) Christian Ebala	2012	16	0	2	0	-	-	-	-	-	-	18	0	-
131	(Moldova) Igor Țîgîrlaș	2013	15	2	2	0	-	-	1	0	0	0	18	2	Moldova
131	(Cameroon) Guy Essame	2014	11	0	1	0	-	-	-	-	6	0	18	0	Cameroon
131	(Kazakhstan) **Azat Nurgaliyev**	2016	11	6	1	0	-	-	0	0	6	1	18	7	Kazakhstan
131	(Cyprus) **Pieros Sotiriou**	2020–2021	15	6	0	0	-	-	1	1	2	0	18	7	Cyprus
131	(Montenegro) **Fatos Bećiraj**	2021	7	2	7	0	-	-	0	0	4	0	18	2	Montenegro (Note: Bećiraj was born in Peja, SR Serbia, but qualified to represent Montenegro, making his debut for Montenegro in 2009.)
131	(Bosnia and Herzegovina) Stjepan Lončar	2023	7	0	0	0	-	-	0	0	11	1	18	1	Bosnia and Herzegovina
139	(Kazakhstan) Olzhas Spanov	2010	15	2	2	0	-	-	-	-	-	-	17	2	-
139	(Moldova) Denis Ilescu	2010	16	0	1	0	-	-	-	-	-	-	17	0	Moldova
139	(Albania) Eneo Bitri	2021–2022	7	0	6	0	-	-	0	0	4	2	17	2	-
142	(Ukraine) Denys Dedechko	2015	10	1	1	0	-	-	0	0	5	0	16	1	Ukraine
143	(Kazakhstan) David Loriya	2009	12	0	3	0	-	-	-	-	-	-	15	0	Kazakhstan
143	(Uzbekistan) **Maksim Shatskikh**	2009	15	10	0	0	-	-	-	-	-	-	15	10	Uzbekistan
143	(Kazakhstan) **Sergey Gridin**	2012	12	3	3	1	-	-	-	-	-	-	15	3	Kazakhstan
143	(Kazakhstan) Yevgeni Goryachi	2012–2015	7	0	8	0	-	-	-	-	-	-	15	0	-
147	(Kazakhstan) Kairat Ashirbekov	2009	11	2	3	2	-	-	-	-	-	-	14	4	Kazakhstan
147	(Kazakhstan) Madiyar Muminov	2009	13	3	1	0	-	-	-	-	-	-	14	3	-
147	(Kazakhstan) Ivan Shevchenko	2010	12	0	2	0	-	-	-	-	-	-	14	0	-
147	(Serbia) Uroš Radaković	2020	12	0	0	0	-	-	0	0	2	0	14	0	Serbia U21
147	(Belarus) Artsyom Rakhmanaw	2022	13	0	1	0	-	-	-	-	0	0	14	0	Belarus
147	(Kazakhstan) Aleksandr Merkel	2026–Present	12	0	0	0	0	0	0	0	2	0	14	0	Kazakhstan
153	(Moldova) **Anatolie Doroș**	2011	13	0	0	0	-	-	0	0	-	-	13	0	Moldova
153	(Kazakhstan) **Mukhtar Mukhtarov**	2012	11	0	2	1	-	-	-	-	-	-	13	1	Kazakhstan
153	(Serbia) Marko Stanojević	2018	9	0	0	0	-	-	1	0	3	0	13	0	Serbia U21
153	(Bosnia and Herzegovina) Semir Smajlagić	2021–2022	11	0	0	0	-	-	2	0	0	0	13	0	Bosnia and Herzegovina U19
153	(France) Keelan Lebon	2022–2023	11	1	2	1	-	-	-	-	0	0	13	2	-
158	(Serbia) Dušan Petronijević	2012	9	0	3	0	-	-	-	-	-	-	12	0	Serbia
158	(Nigeria) Lukman Haruna	2016	10	1	2	0	-	-	0	0	0	0	12	1	Nigeria
158	(Democratic Republic of the Congo) Ndombe Mubele	2019–2020	5	1	0	0	-	-	0	0	7	0	12	1	DR Congo
158	(Kazakhstan) Sanzhar Anuarov	2023–Present	10	0	1	1	1	0	-	-	0	0	12	1	-
158	(Croatia) Nikola Burić	2026–Present	11	1	0	0	-	-	-	-	1	0	12	1	-
163	(Kazakhstan) Igor Avdeyev	2009	10	1	1	0	-	-	-	-	-	-	11	1	Kazakhstan
163	(Kazakhstan) Murat Suyumagambetov	2009–2010	9	1	2	0	-	-	-	-	-	-	11	1	Kazakhstan
163	(Kazakhstan) Maksim Zhalmagambetov	2011	11	1	0	0	-	-	0	0	-	-	11	1	Kazakhstan
163	(Montenegro) Blažo Igumanović	2013	9	0	0	0	-	-	0	0	2	0	11	0	Montenegro
163	(North Macedonia) Agim Ibraimi	2016–2017	6	0	0	0	-	-	0	0	5	1	11	1	North Macedonia
163	(Kazakhstan) Madi Zhakipbayev	2016–2021	8	0	3	0	-	-	0	0	0	0	11	0	Kazakhstan U21
169	(Montenegro) Driton Camaj	2025	8	1	0	0	-	-	-	-	2	0	10	1	Montenegro
170	(North Macedonia) **Vlade Lazarevski**	2010	8	0	1	0	-	-	-	-	-	-	9	0	North Macedonia
170	(Kazakhstan) Olzhas Kerimzhanov	2009–2010	9	0	0	0	-	-	-	-	-	-	9	0	-
170	(Kazakhstan) Birzhan Kulbekov	2015–2016	5	0	3	1	-	-	0	0	1	0	9	1	Kazakhstan U21
170	(Kazakhstan) Lev Skvortsov	2018–2022	2	0	7	0	-	-	0	0	0	0	9	0	Kazakhstan U21
170	(Serbia) Igor Ivanović	2023	5	0	4	1	-	-	0	0	0	0	9	1	-
170	(Greece) Giannis Masouras	2024	6	0	2	0	1	0	-	-	0	0	9	0	Greece U21
176	(Romania) Emil Dică	2012	8	1	0	0	-	-	-	-	-	-	8	1	-
176	(Kazakhstan) Kirill Pasichnik	2012–2013	6	0	1	0	-	-	0	0	1	0	8	0	Kazakhstan U21 (Note: Pasichnik was born in Tutayev, Russia, but qualified to represent Kazakhstan, making his debut for Kazakhstan in 2013.)
176	(Kazakhstan) Gevorg Najaryan	2016–2018	2	0	5	0	-	-	0	0	1	0	8	0	Kazakhstan U21 (Note: Najaryan was born in Yerevan, Armenia, but qualified to represent Kazakhstan, making his debut for Kazakhstan U21 in 2017.)
179	(Kazakhstan) Denis Prokopenko	2010–2012	4	0	3	1	-	-	0	0	-	-	7	1	Kazakhstan U21
179	(Belarus) Renan Bressan	2014	6	1	1	0	-	-	-	-	0	0	7	1	Belarus (Note: Bressan was born in Tubarão, Brazil, but qualified to represent Belarus, making his debut for Belarus in May 2012.)
179	(Kazakhstan) Mikhail Golubnichiy	2015–2017	6	0	1	0	-	-	0	0	0	0	7	0	Kazakhstan U21
179	(Kazakhstan) Birzhan Kulbekov	2014–2016	2	0	4	0	-	-	0	0	1	0	7	0	Kazakhstan U21
179	(Kazakhstan) Berik Shaykhov	2015–2018	4	0	2	0	-	-	1	0	0	0	7	0	Kazakhstan U21
179	(Kazakhstan) Meyrambek Kalmyrza	2020–2023	0	0	7	0	-	-	0	0	0	0	7	0	Kazakhstan U21
179	(Uzbekistan) Asilbek Abdurasulov	2026	6	0	1	0	0	0	-	-	0	0	7	0	-
179	(Serbia) Ivan Miladinović	2026–Present	6	0	0	0	-	-	-	-	1	0	7	0	-
179	(Kazakhstan) Damir Marat	2026–Present	7	0	0	0	-	-	-	-	0	0	7	0	Kazakhstan
188	(Kazakhstan) Vitali Lee	2014	5	0	1	0	-	-	-	-	0	0	6	0	Kazakhstan U21
188	(North Macedonia) Besart Abdurahimi	2016	4	0	2	0	-	-	0	0	0	0	6	0	North Macedonia (Note: Abdurahimi was born in Zagreb, Croatia, but qualified to represent Macedonia, making his debut for Macedonia in May 2014.)
188	(Kazakhstan) Abay Zhunusov	2015–2017	2	0	3	0	-	-	0	0	1	0	6	0	Kazakhstan U19
188	(Kazakhstan) Salamat Zhumabekov	2021–2023	2	0	4	0	-	-	0	0	0	0	6	0	Kazakhstan U19
188	(Kazakhstan) Arman Kenesov	2025–Present	4	0	2	0	-	-	-	-	0	0	6	0	Kazakhstan
193	(Kazakhstan) **Toktar Zhangylyshbay**	2015	4	0	1	0	-	-	0	0	0	0	5	0	Kazakhstan
193	(Kazakhstan) Azamat Nurzhanuly	2021–2022	0	0	5	0	-	-	0	0	0	0	5	0	-
193	(Kazakhstan) Bauyrzhan Akhaev	2021–2023	0	0	5	0	-	-	0	0	0	0	5	0	-
193	(Kazakhstan) Akhmetali Kaltanov	2026–Present	4	1	1	0	-	-	-	-	0	0	5	1	-
197	(Kazakhstan) Sanzhar Shurakhanov	2020–2023	0	0	4	0	-	-	0	0	0	0	4	0	-
197	(Kazakhstan) Dias Kanatkali	2021–2023	0	0	4	0	-	-	0	0	0	0	4	0	-
197	(Kazakhstan) Daniyar Khasenov	2009	4	2	0	0	-	-	-	-	-	-	4	2	-
197	(Kazakhstan) Talgat Adyrbekov	2009	4	0	0	0	-	-	-	-	-	-	4	0	-
197	(Kazakhstan) Daurenbek Tazhimbetov	2013	4	0	0	0	-	-	0	0	0	0	4	0	Kazakhstan
197	(Kazakhstan) Batyrkhan Mustafin	2023–2025	2	0	1	1	0	0	0	0	1	0	4	1	-
203	(Kazakhstan) Aleksandr Shatskikh	2009	2	2	1	1	-	-	-	-	-	-	3	3	Kazakhstan
203	(Kazakhstan) Zakhar Korobov	2009	3	0	0	0	-	-	-	-	-	-	3	0	-
203	(Kazakhstan) Amanbol Aliev	2014–2017	1	0	2	0	-	-	0	0	0	0	3	0	-
203	(Kazakhstan) Rakhat Maratov	2021–2022	0	0	3	0	-	-	0	0	0	0	3	0	-
203	(Kazakhstan) Yuriy Akhanov	2021–2024	1	0	2	0	-	-	0	0	0	0	3	0	-
203	(Kazakhstan) Olzhas Adil	2021–2022	0	0	3	0	-	-	0	0	0	0	3	0	Kazakhstan U19
203	(Kazakhstan) Ruslan Kirgetov	2021–Present	0	0	3	0	-	-	0	0	0	0	3	0	-
203	(Spain) Carlitos	2024	3	0	0	0	0	0	-	-	0	0	3	0	-
203	(Kazakhstan) Aytuar Token	2026–Present	2	0	1	0	-	-	-	-	0	0	3	0	-
212	(Kazakhstan) Sergei Larin	2009–2010	1	0	1	0	-	-	-	-	-	-	2	0	Kazakhstan
212	(Moldova) Eduard Văluță	2009	2	0	0	0	-	-	-	-	-	-	2	0	Moldova
212	(Kazakhstan) **Vyacheslav Erbes**	2010	2	0	0	0	-	-	-	-	-	-	2	0	Kazakhstan
212	(Kazakhstan) Rinat Khayrullin	2015–2016	1	0	1	0	-	-	-	-	0	0	2	0	Kazakhstan U21
212	(Kazakhstan) Pavel Khalezov	2010–2015	1	0	1	0	-	-	-	-	0	0	2	0	Kazakhstan U21
212	(Kazakhstan) Adil Balgabaev	2014–2015	1	0	1	0	-	-	-	-	0	0	2	0	Kazakhstan U18
212	(Kazakhstan) Vladislav Mendybayev	2013–2016	2	0	0	0	-	-	-	-	0	0	2	0	Kazakhstan U21
212	(Kazakhstan) Aleksey Rodionov	2015–2017	1	0	0	0	-	-	1	0	0	0	2	0	-
212	(Kazakhstan) Amir Kalabaev	2015–2016	1	0	1	0	-	-	0	0	0	0	2	0	-
212	(Kazakhstan) Alim Ilyasov	2016–2021	1	0	1	0	-	-	0	0	0	0	2	0	Kazakhstan U19
212	(Kazakhstan) Viktor Pron	2015–2018	1	0	1	0	-	-	0	0	0	0	2	0	Kazakhstan U19
212	(Kazakhstan) Stanislav Pavlov	2018	1	0	1	0	-	-	0	0	0	0	2	0	Kazakhstan U21
212	(Kazakhstan) Zhaslan Kairkenov	2018	1	0	1	0	-	-	0	0	0	0	2	0	Kazakhstan U21
212	(Kazakhstan) Danil Podymskiy	2016–2023	0	0	2	0	-	-	0	0	0	0	2	0	Kazakhstan U19
212	(Liberia) Mohammed Kamara	2022	2	0	0	0	-	-	-	-	0	0	2	0	-
212	(Kazakhstan) Ruslan Valikhan	2026–Present	1	0	1	0	0	0	-	-	0	0	2	0	-
212	(Kazakhstan) Timur Tokenov	2026–Present	0	0	2	0	-	-	-	-	0	0	2	0	-
212	(Kazakhstan) Nuradil Serikov	2026–Present	0	0	2	0	-	-	-	-	0	0	2	0	-
212	(Kazakhstan) Nursat Nurmukhambet	2026–Present	0	0	2	0	-	-	-	-	0	0	2	0	-
231	(Serbia) Danilo Belić	2011	1	0	0	0	-	-	0	0	-	-	1	0	-
231	(Kazakhstan) Islambek Kulekenov	2013–2016	1	0	0	0	-	-	-	-	0	0	1	0	Kazakhstan U18
231	(Kazakhstan) Igor Popadinets	2011–2014	0	0	1	0	-	-	-	-	0	0	1	0	-
231	(Kazakhstan) Zhakyp Kozhamberdy	2015	0	0	0	0	-	-	0	0	1	0	1	0	Kazakhstan
231	(Kazakhstan) Ardak Saulet	2014–2017	0	0	1	0	-	-	0	0	0	0	1	0	Kazakhstan U19
231	(Kazakhstan) Daulet Zaynetdinov	2016–2019	0	0	1	0	-	-	0	0	0	0	1	0	-
231	(Kazakhstan) Sayan Mukanov	2018	0	0	1	0	-	-	0	0	0	0	1	0	Kazakhstan U21
231	(Kazakhstan) Dauren Iskakov	2018	1	0	0	0	-	-	0	0	0	0	1	0	Kazakhstan U21
231	(Kazakhstan) Samat Bortay	2018	0	0	1	0	-	-	0	0	0	0	1	0	Kazakhstan U21
231	(Kazakhstan) Danijar Kushekbaev	2018	0	0	1	0	-	-	0	0	0	0	1	0	Kazakhstan U21
231	(Kazakhstan) Samat Mazhit	2018	1	0	0	0	-	-	0	0	0	0	1	0	Kazakhstan U21
231	(Kazakhstan) Adilzhan Dyusembaev	2018	1	0	0	0	-	-	0	0	0	0	1	0	Kazakhstan U21
231	(Kazakhstan) Daniil Pichkarev	2018	1	0	0	0	-	-	0	0	0	0	1	0	Kazakhstan U21
231	(Kazakhstan) Ruslan Makhan	2018	0	0	1	0	-	-	0	0	0	0	1	0	Kazakhstan U21
231	(Kazakhstan) Zhantore Zhumadilov	2018	1	0	0	0	-	-	0	0	0	0	1	0	Kazakhstan U21
231	(Kazakhstan) Ravil Ibragimov	2019	0	0	1	0	-	-	0	0	0	0	1	0	-
231	(Kazakhstan) Ruslan Pistol	2021	0	0	1	0	-	-	0	0	0	0	1	0	-
231	(Kazakhstan) Andrey Berezutskiy	2021–2024	0	0	1	0	-	-	0	0	0	0	1	0	-
231	(Kazakhstan) Aydos Kumarov	2021–2023	0	0	1	0	-	-	0	0	0	0	1	0	-
231	(Kazakhstan) Aldair Adilov	2021–2022	0	0	1	0	-	-	0	0	0	0	1	0	-
231	(Kazakhstan) Adilkhan Sabyr	2021–2022	0	0	1	0	-	-	0	0	0	0	1	0	-
231	(Kazakhstan) Makhmud Dunzurov	2021–2023	0	0	1	0	-	-	0	0	0	0	1	0	-
231	(Kazakhstan) Valikhan Tyulyupov	2022–Present	0	0	1	0	-	-	0	0	0	0	1	0	-
231	(Kazakhstan) Alikhan Umbitaliev	2022–Present	0	0	1	0	-	-	0	0	0	0	1	0	-
231	(Kazakhstan) Zhasasyn Kalmakhambet	2022	0	0	1	0	-	-	0	0	0	0	1	0	-
231	(Kazakhstan) Danila Karpikov	2026–Present	0	0	1	0	-	-	-	-	0	0	1	0	-
231	(Kazakhstan) Musa Taushev	2026–Present	0	0	1	0	-	-	-	-	0	0	1	0	-
231	(Kazakhstan) Alikhan Zheksenbek	2026–Present	0	0	1	0	-	-	-	-	0	0	1	0	-
231	(Kazakhstan) Rakhimzhan Amangeldinov	2026–Present	0	0	1	0	-	-	-	-	0	0	1	0	-
231	(Kazakhstan) Beybarys Abilda	2026–Present	0	0	1	0	-	-	-	-	0	0	1	0	-
231	(Kazakhstan) Abzal Sagyn	2026–Present	0	0	1	0	-	-	-	-	0	0	1	0	-
231	(Kazakhstan) Sanat Satenov	2026–Present	0	0	1	0	-	-	-	-	0	0	1	0	-
231	(Kazakhstan) Ismail Murtaza	2026–Present	0	0	1	0	-	-	-	-	0	0	1	0	-
231	(Kazakhstan) Arsen Akhmetov	2026–Present	0	0	1	0	-	-	-	-	0	0	1	0	-
231	(Kazakhstan) Anuar Tolendi	2026–Present	1	0	0	0	-	-	-	-	0	0	1	0	-

=== Clean sheets ===
As of match played 31 October 2026
Competitive, professional matches only, appearances including substitutes appear in brackets.

	Name	Years	League	Cup	League Cup	Super Cup	Europe	Total	Ratio
1	(Kazakhstan) Nenad Erić	2011–2020	96 (227)	7 (16)	(-)	5 (7)	21 (68)	**129** (318)	0.41
2	(Croatia) **Josip Čondrić**	2023–Present	24 (57)	0 (3)	1 (3)	0 (1)	7 (27)	**32** (91)	0.35
3	(Kazakhstan) Aleksandr Mokin	2016-2019	24 (44)	2 (6)	(-)	0 (0)	1 (7)	**27** (57)	0.47
4	(Kazakhstan) Aleksandr Zarutskiy	2021–2024	11 (33)	8 (16)	0 (0)	0 (2)	0 (3)	**19** (54)	0.35
5	(Kazakhstan) **Mukhammedzhan Seysen**	2024–Present	11 (34)	0 (2)	3 (3)	0 (0)	1 (5)	**15** (44)	0.34
6	(Russia) Roman Gerus	2010	12 (23)	1 (1)	(-)	(-)	(-)	**13** (24)	0.54
7	(Kazakhstan) Dmytro Nepohodov	2019-2021	10 (24)	0 (3)	(-)	1 (2)	1 (5)	**12** (34)	0.35
8	(Russia) Aleksei Belkin	2010-2012	5 (14)	4 (4)	(-)	0 (1)	(-)	**9** (19)	0.47
8	(Kazakhstan) Vladimir Loginovsky	2013-2015	8 (20)	1 (4)	(-)	0 (0)	0 (3)	**9** (27)	0.33
10	(Kazakhstan) Roman Nesterenko	2009	6 (15)	1 (3)	(-)	(-)	(-)	**7** (18)	0.39
11	(Serbia) Marko Milošević	2022	5 (15)	1 (3)	(-)	0 (0)	0 (1)	**6** (19)	0.32
12	(Kazakhstan) David Loria	2009	4 (12)	0 (3)	(-)	(-)	(-)	**4** (15)	0.27
13	(Kazakhstan) Mikhail Golubnichi	2015-2016	2 (6)	0 (1)	(-)	0 (0)	0 (0)	**2** (7)	0.29
14	(Kazakhstan) Danil Podymksy	2016–2023	0 (0)	0 (2)	(-)	0 (0)	0 (0)	**0** (2)	0
15	(Kazakhstan) **Danila Karpikov**	2026–Present	0 (0)	0 (1)	(-)	0 (0)	0 (0)	**0** (1)	0

=== International tournament representation ===
==== CAF Africa Cup of Nations ====
The following were part of African Cup of Nations squads while playing for Astana.

Tournament	Players
2017 Africa Cup of Nations	(Democratic Republic of the Congo) Junior Kabananga

==== FIFA World Cup ====
The following were part of World Cup squads while playing for Astana.

Tournament	Players	Ref.
2026 FIFA World Cup	(Bosnia and Herzegovina) Ivan Bašić	

== Team ==
=== Record wins ===
Record win
7–0 v Atyrau (9 September 2017)
7–0 v Turan (18 July 2025)
Record League win
7–0 v Atyrau (9 September 2017)
7–0 v Turan (18 July 2025)
Record home win
7–0 v Atyrau (9 September 2017)
7–0 v Turan (18 July 2025)
Record away win
6–1 v Irtysh Pavlodar (7 April 2018)
Record Cup win
4–0 v Vostok (1 May 2013)
4–0 v Tobol (18 June 2014)
Record Super Cup win
3–0 v Kairat (4 March 2018)
Record European win
5–1 v Valletta (8 August 2019)

=== Record defeats ===
Record defeat
6–0 v AZ Alkmaar (24 October 2019)
Record League defeat
5–0 v Irtysh Pavlodar (26 May 2011)
Record home defeat
0–5 v AZ Alkmaar (7 November 2019)
Record away defeat
6–0 v AZ Alkmaar (24 October 2019)
Record Cup defeat
3–0 v Kairat (7 November 2021)
3–0 v Kairat (20 November 2021)
Record Super Cup defeat
2–0 v Kairat (4 March 2017)
Record European defeat
6–0 v AZ Alkmaar (24 October 2019)

=== Wins/draws/losses in a season ===
Most wins in a league season
25 – 2017
Most draws in a league season
10 – 2014
Most defeats in a league season
10 – 2010
Fewest wins in a league season
11 – 2020
Fewest draws in a league season
0 – 2009
Fewest defeats in a league season
3 – 2021

=== Goals ===
Most League goals scored in a season
74 – 2017
Fewest League goals scored in a season
32 – 2020
Most League goals conceded in a season
37 – 2011
Fewest League goals conceded in a season
21 – 2016, 2017, 2020

=== List of hat-tricks ===
The Result column shows the Astana score first.

As of match played 28 March 2026

Key
(X)	Number of times player scored a hat-trick (only for players with multiple hat-tricks)
4	Player scored four goals
5	Player scored five goals
6	Player scored six goals
	Astana lost the match
	Astana drew the match

#	Player	G	Against	Res.	Date	Competition	Home/Away/Neutral	Ref.
1	(Moldova) Igor Bugaiov	3	Aktobe	3–2	15 October 2011	Premier League	Home	
2	(Bulgaria) Atanas Kurdov	3	Irtysh Pavlodar	3–4	19 April 2014	Premier League	Home	
3	(Central African Republic) Foxi Kéthévoama	3	Atyrau	3–0	27 July 2014	Premier League	Home	
4	(Ghana) Patrick Twumasi	3	Aktobe	6–1	4 October 2014	Premier League	Home	
5	(Democratic Republic of the Congo) Junior Kabananga	3	Shakhter Karagandy	4–1	28 May 2017	Premier League	Home	
6	(Kazakhstan) Bakhtiyar Zaynutdinov	3	Irtysh Pavlodar	6–1	7 April 2018	Premier League	Away	
7	(Kazakhstan) Aleksey Shchyotkin	3	Irtysh Pavlodar	3–0	26 August 2018	Premier League	Away	
8	(Croatia) Marin Tomasov	3	Irtysh Pavlodar	4–0	11 November 2018	Premier League	Home	
9	(Croatia) Marin Tomasov (2)	3	Santa Coloma	4–1	1 August 2019	UEFA Europa League	Home	
10	(Croatia) Marin Tomasov (3)	4	Aktobe	5–0	27 October 2019	Premier League	Home	
11	(Croatia) Marin Tomasov (4)	3	Kairat	6–0	14 May 2022	Premier League	Home	
12	(Croatia) Marin Tomasov (5)	3	Maktaaral	4–0	3 July 2022	Premier League	Home	
14	(Portugal) Pedro Eugénio	3	Shakhter Karagandy	7–1	14 August 2022	Kazakhstan Cup	Away	
15	(Kazakhstan) Abat Aymbetov	3	Ordabasy	6–0	9 October 2022	Premier League	Home	
16	(Kazakhstan) Timur Dosmagambetov	4	Kairat	4–0	15 October 2022	Premier League	Away	
17	(Portugal) Pedro Eugénio (2)	3	Atyrau	5–1	23 October 2022	Premier League	Home	
18	(Croatia) Marin Tomasov (6)	3	Okzhetpes	5–2	27 September 2023	Premier League	Home	
19	(Nigeria) Geoffrey Chinedu	3	Shakhter Karagandy	4–2	19 July 2024	Kazakhstan Cup	Away	
20	(Croatia) Marin Tomasov (7)	3	Zhetysu	3–0	30 March 2025	Premier League	Home	
21	(Nigeria) Geoffrey Chinedu (2)	3	Aktobe	5–3	19 October 2025	Premier League	Home	

=== Points ===
Most points in a season
77 in 33 matches, 2018 Kazakhstan Premier League
Fewest points in a season
33 in 32 matches, 2011 Kazakhstan Premier League
