= 2011 FC Astana season =

FC Astana
2011 season
- Chairman: Kaisar Bekenov
- Manager: Holger Fach
- Stadium: Astana Arena
- Premier League: 4th
- Kazakhstan Cup: Second Round vs Kairat
- Kazakhstan Super Cup: Champions
- Top goalscorer: League: Dragan Bogavac (12); All: Dragan Bogavac (12)
- Highest home attendance: 9,000 vs Aktobe (31 March 2011) vs Shakhter Karagandy (14 August 2011)
- Lowest home attendance: 2,500 vs Zhetysu (6 March 2011) vs Kairat (20 April 2011) vs Kaisar (24 April 2011) vs Atyrau (8 June 2011)
- Average home league attendance: 4,7035 (29 October 2011)
Home colours	Away colours	Third colours

The 2011 FC Astana season was the third successive season that the club played in the Kazakhstan Premier League, the highest tier of association football in Kazakhstan. It was their first season competing as FC Astana having changed their name from Lokomotiv Astana, finishing the season in fourth place in the league and reaching the Second Round of the Kazakhstan Cup.

== Squad ==
As of match played 29 October 2011

No.	Name	Nationality	Position	Date of birth (age)	Signed from	Signed in	Apps.	Goals
Goalkeepers
1	Nenad Erić	(Serbia)	GK	26 May 1982 (aged 29)	Kairat	2011	32	0
37	Vyacheslav Kotlyar	(Kazakhstan)	GK	3 March 1982 (aged 29)	Kazakhmys	2011	0	0
55	Aleksei Belkin	(Russia)	GK	25 November 1981 (aged 29)	Volga Tver	2010	15	0
77	Aleksandr Konochkin	(Kazakhstan)	GK	20 January 1994 (aged 17)	Academy	2011	0	0
78	Rimas Martinkus	(Kazakhstan)	GK	13 January 1993 (aged 18)	Academy	2011	0	0
95	Aleksandr Sidorov	(Kazakhstan)	GK	13 March 1995 (aged 16)	Academy	2011	0	0
Defenders
2	Damir Dautov	(Kazakhstan)	DF	3 March 1990 (aged 21)	Academy	2009	53	2
4	Maksim Zhalmagambetov	(Kazakhstan)	DF	11 July 1983 (aged 28)	Irtysh Pavlodar	2011	11	1
5	Piraliy Aliev	(Kazakhstan)	DF	13 January 1984 (aged 27)	Atyrau	2011	26	1
6	Kairat Nurdauletov	(Kazakhstan)	DF	6 November 1982 (aged 28)	Tobol	2010	53	2
19	Mark Gorman	(Kazakhstan)	DF	9 February 1989 (aged 22)	Hapoel Petah Tikva	2010	49	1
20	Dmitri Shomko	(Kazakhstan)	DF	19 March 1990 (aged 21)	loan from Irtysh Pavlodar	2011	12	0
27	Mikhail Rozhkov	(Kazakhstan)	DF	27 December 1983 (aged 27)	Rostov	2010	63	4
30	Radmir Moksinov	(Kazakhstan)	DF	9 November 1991 (aged 19)	Academy	2011	0	0
35	Zhanat Zakirov	(Kazakhstan)	DF	22 September 1992 (aged 19)	Academy	2010	0	0
43	Anuar Tokenov	(Kazakhstan)	DF	2 March 1992 (aged 19)	Academy	2011	0	0
44	Pavel Khalezov	(Kazakhstan)	DF	10 August 1994 (aged 17)	Academy	2010	0	0
57	Erbol Musabaev	(Kazakhstan)	DF	2 March 1992 (aged 19)	Academy	2010	0	0
69	Ivan Navrotsky	(Kazakhstan)	DF	2 March 1992 (aged 19)	Academy	2010	0	0
Midfielders
8	Andrei Karpovich	(Kazakhstan)	MF	18 January 1981 (aged 30)	Dynamo Moscow	2011	35	2
9	Nurbol Zhumaskaliyev	(Kazakhstan)	MF	11 May 1981 (aged 30)	Tobol	2011	33	10
17	Bobi Bozhinovski	(North Macedonia)	MF	24 February 1981 (aged 30)	Rabotnički	2010	35	1
18	Maksim Azovskiy	(Kazakhstan)	MF	2 April 1990 (aged 21)	Zhetysu	2010	59	0
22	Marat Shakhmetov	(Kazakhstan)	MF	6 February 1989 (aged 22)	Alma-Ata	2009	77	4
23	Serik Zaynalov	(Kazakhstan)	MF	29 January 1992 (aged 19)	Academy	2010	0	0
31	Azat Smagulov	(Kazakhstan)	MF	31 July 1992 (aged 19)	Academy	2010	0	0
45	Maksim Shaubert	(Kazakhstan)	MF	24 October 1992 (aged 19)	Academy	2011	0	0
48	Zhumazhan Musabekov	(Kazakhstan)	MF	4 December 1992 (aged 18)	Academy	2010	0	0
66	Bauyrzhan Seisenbekov	(Kazakhstan)	MF	24 May 1989 (aged 22)	Academy	2011	0	0
88	Rinat Khairullin	(Kazakhstan)	MF	19 December 1994 (aged 16)	Academy	2011	0	0
91	Arsen Inkarbekov	(Kazakhstan)	MF	27 February 1991 (aged 20)	Academy	2010	0	0
Forwards
7	Anatolie Doroș	(Moldova)	FW	21 March 1983 (aged 28)	Irtysh Pavlodar	2011	13	0
10	Igor Bugaiov	(Moldova)	FW	26 June 1984 (aged 27)	Metalurh Zaporizhya	2010	64	26
11	Dragan Bogavac	(Montenegro)	FW	7 April 1980 (aged 31)	Mainz 05	2011	28	12
14	Roman Pakholyuk	(Ukraine)	FW	20 September 1988 (aged 23)	Taraz	2009	60	7
17	Tanat Nusserbayev	(Kazakhstan)	FW	1 January 1987 (aged 24)	Ordabasy	2011	26	7
25	Aisultan Nazarbayev	(Kazakhstan)	FW	26 August 1990 (aged 21)	Academy	2011	0	0
34	Timur Bakhriden	(Kazakhstan)	FW	23 February 1994 (aged 17)	Academy	2011	0	0
37	Yerzhan Mukhamedin	(Kazakhstan)	FW	2 September 1990 (aged 21)	Academy	2010	0	0
40	Denis Prokopenko	(Kazakhstan)	FW	5 October 1991 (aged 20)	Academy	2010	3	0
49	Jaba Jamarishvili	(Kazakhstan)	FW	18 August 1992 (aged 19)	Academy	2010	0	0
Players away on loan
7	Ulan Konysbayev	(Kazakhstan)	MF	28 May 1989 (aged 21)	Taraz	2011	13	0
13	Danilo Belić	(Serbia)	FW	10 November 1980 (aged 30)	Zhetysu	2011	1	0
37	Islambek Kuat	(Kazakhstan)	MF	12 January 1993 (aged 18)	Academy	2010	0	0
Players that left during the season
3	Aleksandr Kirov	(Kazakhstan)	DF	4 September 1984 (aged 27)	Atyrau	2010	45	3
8	Ivan Shevchenko	(Kazakhstan)	DF	10 September 1987 (aged 24)	Shakhter Karagandy	2010	14	0
12	Zaurbek Pliyev	(Russia)	DF	27 September 1991 (aged 20)	Spartak Nalchik	2011	22	1

== Transfers ==
=== Winter ===
In: Note: Flags indicate national team as defined under FIFA eligibility rules; some limited exceptions apply. Players may hold more than one non-FIFA nationality.

No.	Pos.	Nation	Player
1	GK	SRB	Nenad Erić (from (Kazakhstan) Kairat)
5	DF	KAZ	Piraliy Aliev (from (Kazakhstan) Atyrau)
7	MF	KAZ	Ulan Konysbayev (from (Kazakhstan) Taraz)
8	MF	KAZ	Andrei Karpovich (from (Kazakhstan) Aktobe)
9	MF	KAZ	Nurbol Zhumaskaliyev (from (Kazakhstan) Tobol)
11	FW	MNE	Dragan Bogavac (from (Germany) Mainz 05)
12	DF	RUS	Zaurbek Pliyev (from (Russia) Spartak Nalchik)
13	FW	SRB	Danilo Belić (from (Kazakhstan) Zhetysu)
17	FW	KAZ	Tanat Nusserbayev (from (Kazakhstan) Ordabasy)
20	DF	KAZ	Dmitri Shomko (loan from (Kazakhstan) Irtysh)
37	GK	KAZ	Vyacheslav Kotlyar (from (Kazakhstan) Kazakhmys)

Out: Note: Flags indicate national team as defined under FIFA eligibility rules; some limited exceptions apply. Players may hold more than one non-FIFA nationality.

No.	Pos.	Nation	Player
1	GK	TKM	Arslan Satubaldin (to (Kazakhstan) Kaisar)
4	DF	MKD	Vlade Lazarevski (to (France) Amiens)
5	DF	KAZ	Maksim Samchenko (to (Kazakhstan) Zhetysu)
7	MF	KAZ	Zhambyl Kukeyev (to (Kazakhstan) Shakhter Karagandy)
8	FW	KAZ	Sergei Khizhnichenko (to (Kazakhstan) Shakhter Karagandy, previously on loan to (Kazakhstan) Atyrau)
9	MF	MDA	Valeriu Andronic (to (Russia) SKA-Energiya Khabarovsk)
11	FW	UKR	Roman Pakholyuk (to (Kazakhstan) Taraz)
15	MF	KAZ	Vyacheslav Erbes (to (Kazakhstan) Shakhter Karagandy)
16	GK	KAZ	Roman Tsyganovkin (to (Kazakhstan) Astana-1964)
21	GK	KAZ	Beybitzhan Mamraimov
23	FW	KAZ	Sergei Ostapenko (to (Kazakhstan) Zhetysu)
32	MF	KAZ	Olzhas Spanov (to (Kazakhstan) Ak Bulak)
37	MF	KAZ	Islambek Kuat (loan to (Kazakhstan) Okzhetpes)
38	MF	KAZ	Askat Baimuldaev
41	FW	KAZ	Stanislav Miroshnichenko
44	MF	KAZ	Askat Baimuldaev
45	MF	KAZ	Anuar Isaev
46	DF	KAZ	Abdumutam Zholdasov
47	MF	KAZ	Dmitry Kaminsky
49	MF	KAZ	Kirill Sazonov
51	FW	KAZ	Bimuhamed Bukeev
53	FW	KAZ	Yerlan Turashbaev (to (Kazakhstan) Kaisar)
77	GK	RUS	Roman Gerus (to (Russia) Dynamo Bryansk)

=== Summer ===
In: Note: Flags indicate national team as defined under FIFA eligibility rules; some limited exceptions apply. Players may hold more than one non-FIFA nationality.

No.	Pos.	Nation	Player
4	DF	KAZ	Maksim Zhalmagambetov (from (Kazakhstan) Irtysh)
7	FW	MDA	Anatolie Doroș (from (Kazakhstan) Irtysh)
14	FW	UKR	Roman Pakholyuk (from (Kazakhstan) Taraz)

Out: Note: Flags indicate national team as defined under FIFA eligibility rules; some limited exceptions apply. Players may hold more than one non-FIFA nationality.

No.	Pos.	Nation	Player
3	DF	KAZ	Aleksandr Kirov (to (Kazakhstan) Shakhter Karagandy)
7	MF	KAZ	Ulan Konysbayev (loan to (Kazakhstan) Shakhter Karagandy)
8	DF	KAZ	Ivan Shevchenko (to (Kazakhstan) Shakhter Karagandy)
12	DF	RUS	Zaurbek Pliyev (to (Russia) Alania Vladikavkaz)
13	FW	SRB	Danilo Belić (loan to (Kazakhstan) Taraz)

== Competitions ==
=== Super Cup ===
2 March 2011	Tobol	1 – 2	Astana	Astana
19:00 (UTC+6)	Kislitsyn 54'; Kučera (yellow card) 60'; Sheptytskyi (yellow card) 85'	Summary	Bugaiov 15', 60' (pen.)	Stadium: Astana Arena; Attendance: 4,100; Referee: Aydin Rakhimbayev

=== Premier League ===
==== First round ====
===== Results summary =====
Overall								Home						Away					
Pld	W	D	L	GF	GA	GD	Pts	W	D	L	GF	GA	GD	W	D	L	GF	GA	GD
22	13	6	3	35	19	+16	45	9	1	1	24	7	+17	4	5	2	11	12	−1

Last updated: 30 July 2011.
Source: See Results

===== Results =====
6 March 2011 1	Astana	0 – 2	Zhetysu	Astana
15:00 (UTC+6)	Gorman (yellow card) 57'	Summary	Muzhikov (yellow card) 40'; Ostapenko 65'	Stadium: Astana Arena; Attendance: 2,500; Referee: Igor Khisamutdinov

12 March 2011 2	Astana	1 – 0	Ordabasy	Astana
15:00 (UTC+6)	Konysbayev (red card) 59'; Nusserbayev 87'	Summary	Perić (yellow card) 54'; Nurgaliev (yellow card) 59'; Yevstigneyev (yellow card) 79'; Tazhimbetov (yellow card) 85'	Stadium: Astana Arena; Attendance: 3,000; Referee: Gennadiy Zhukovskiy

17 March 2011 3	Taraz	1 – 2	Astana	Taraz
16:30 (UTC+6)	Stjepanović 61'; Kurgulin (yellow card) 69'; D.Evstigneev (yellow card) 70'; Memišević (yellow card) 90'	Summary	Aliev 8' (yellow card) 90'; Shakhmetov (yellow card) 23'; Nusserbayev 43'; Pliyev (yellow card) 52'; Nurdauletov (yellow card) 69'	Stadium: Taraz Central Stadium; Attendance: 1,500; Referee: Viktor Antonov

31 March 2011 4	Astana	1 – 0	Aktobe	Astana
17:30 (UTC+6)	Nusserbayev 21'; Pliyev (yellow card) 61'	Summary	Chichulin (yellow card) 39'; Bono (yellow card) 69'	Stadium: Astana Arena; Attendance: 9,000; Referee: Sergey Pasko

4 April 2011 5	Shakhter Karagandy	0 – 0	Astana	Karagandy
17:00 (UTC+6)	A.Barantsev (yellow card) 23'; Đidić (yellow card) 27'	Summary		Stadium: Shakhter Stadium; Attendance: 3,000; Referee: Akmalkhan Kholmatov

9 April 2011 6	Astana	2 – 0	Vostok	Astana
15:00 (UTC+6)	Bogavac 32'; Shakhmetov 65'	Summary	M.Gabyshev (yellow card) 39'; Avdeyev (yellow card) 48'; Y.Lunev (yellow card) 85'	Stadium: Astana Arena; Attendance: 4,000; Referee: Kairat Slambekov

16 April 2011 7	Kairat	2 – 3	Astana	Almaty
17:00 (UTC+6)	Đorđević (yellow card) 29' (yellow-red card) 32'; Nusserbayev 56' (o.g.); E.Kostrub 72'	Summary	Zhumaskaliyev 18' (yellow card) 90'; Nusserbayev 40'; Aliev (yellow card) 55'; Bogavac 80'; Rozhkov (red card) 90'	Stadium: Central Stadium; Attendance: 2,000; Referee: Ruslan Duzmambetov

24 April 2011 8	Astana	5 – 1	Kaisar	Astana
15:00 (UTC+6)	Zhumaskaliyev 25', 90+3'; Nusserbayev (yellow card) 45'; Bogavac 63'; Aliev (yellow card) 67'; Konysbayev 78'; Shakhmetov 90'	Summary	Bogdan (yellow card) 24'; S.Sagyndykov (yellow card) 47'; Ibraev 66'; Maxim (yellow card) 75'	Stadium: Astana Arena; Attendance: 2,500; Referee: Aleksei Bobrov

30 April 2011 9	Atyrau	0 – 0	Astana	Atyrau
18:00 (UTC+6)	Jonathas (yellow card) 58'; Travin (yellow card) 85'	Summary	I.Shevchenko (yellow card) 67'	Stadium: Munaishy Stadium; Attendance: 5,000; Referee: Aleksandr Gauzer

7 May 2011 10	Astana	0 – 0	Irtysh	Astana
15:00 (UTC+6)	Zhumaskaliyev (yellow card) 90+1'	Summary	Y.Akhmetov (yellow card) 90'	Stadium: Astana Arena; Attendance: 5,500; Referee: Pavel Saliy

15 May 2011 11	Tobol	0 – 1	Astana	Kostanay
15:00 (UTC+6)	Ovshinov (yellow card) 11'	Summary	Pliyev (yellow card) 11'; Shakhmetov 72'	Stadium: Kostanay Central Stadium; Attendance: 5,000; Referee: Igor Aleshin

21 May 2011 12	Astana	3 – 1	Tobol	Astana
15:00 (UTC+6)	Rozhkov 13'; Bugaiov 21' (yellow card) 28'; Konysbayev 76'	Summary	Šljivić (yellow card) 47'; Bogdanov (yellow card) 69'; Sheptytskyi (yellow card) 87'	Stadium: Astana Arena; Attendance: 6,000; Referee: Gennadiy Zhukovskiy

26 May 2011 13	Irtysh	5 – 0	Astana	Pavlodar
19:00 (UTC+6)	Chernyshov (yellow card) 8'; K.Zarechniy 20'; Daskalov 37', 64'; A.Mikhaylyuk (yellow card) 52'; Shabalin 64', 90'	Summary	Konysbayev (yellow card) 27'; Pliyev (yellow card) 55'	Stadium: Pavlodar Central Stadium; Attendance: 4,200

8 June 2011 14	Astana	3 – 2	Atyrau	Astana
19:00 (UTC+6)	Rozhkov 23'; Zhumaskaliyev 35'; Nusserbayev 67'	Summary	K.Aleynikov 74', 79'; V.Yakovlev (yellow card) 87'	Stadium: Astana Arena; Attendance: 2,500; Referee: Bolat Karlibayev

12 June 2011 15	Kaisar	2 – 4	Astana	Kyzylorda
18:00 (UTC+6)	Bogdan 7'; S.Sagyndykov (yellow card) 27'; Azovskiy (yellow card) 31'; A.Baltaev (yellow card) 47'; Crnogorac (yellow card) 63'; Maxim 66'; Edeipo (yellow card) 66'	Summary	Nusserbayev 11'; Zhumaskaliyev 40'; Bugaiov (yellow card) 47'; Pliyev 52'; Bogavac 71'	Stadium: Gany Muratbayev Stadium; Attendance: 2,500; Referee: Aydin Rakhimbayev

19 June 2011 16	Astana	6 – 1	Kairat	Astana
17:00 (UTC+6)	Bugaiov 3', 55' (pen.); Bogavac 22'; Gorman 35'; Konysbayev 74'; Zhumaskaliyev 81'	Summary	Y.Goriachiy (yellow card) 36'; A.Tsvetkov (yellow card) 54'; Klimov (yellow card) 68'; Strukov 90+2'	Stadium: Astana Arena; Attendance: 5,000; Referee: Aleksandr Gauzer

25 June 2011 17	Vostok	0 – 0	Astana	Oskemen
18:00 (UTC+6)	Zgura (yellow card) 56'; Abdulin (yellow card) 87'	Summary	Aliev (yellow card) 17'; Božinovski (yellow card) 89'; Zhalmagambetov (yellow card) 90'	Stadium: Vostok Stadium; Attendance: 1,500; Referee: Viktor Antonov

3 July 2011 18	Astana	2 – 0	Shakhter Karagandy	Astana
17:00 (UTC+6)	Zhumaskaliyev (yellow card) 40' (goal) 57'; Bogavac 60'	Summary	Baizhanov (yellow card) 75'; A.Borantaev (yellow card) 90+2'	Stadium: Astana Arena; Attendance: 6,500; Referee: Kairat Slambekov

10 July 2011 19	Aktobe	0 – 0	Astana	Aktobe
21:00 (UTC+6)	Logvinenko (yellow card) 72'	Summary	D.Dautov (yellow card) 68'; Pakholyuk (yellow card) 83'	Stadium: Central Stadium; Attendance: 9,000; Referee: Igor Khisamutdinov

16 July 2011 20	Astana	1 – 0	Taraz	Astana
17:00 (UTC+6)	Bogavac 90' (pen.)	Summary	Adamović (yellow card) 24'; V.Yakovlev (yellow card) 90+1'; Jovanović (yellow card) 90+2'	Stadium: Astana Arena; Attendance: 3,500; Referee: Akmalkhan Kholmatov

23 July 2011 21	Ordabasy	1 – 1	Astana	Shymkent
18:30 (UTC+6)	Tazhimbetov 59'; Trajković (yellow card) 63'; Mwesigwa (yellow card) 60'	Summary	Bogavac 4'; Nurdauletov (yellow card) 24'; Pliyev (yellow card) 47'; Shakhmetov (yellow card) 61'; Erić (yellow card) 90'	Stadium: Kazhimukan Munaitpasov Stadium; Attendance: 5,000; Referee: Igor Khisamutdinov

30 July 2011 22	Zhetysu	1 – 0	Astana	Taldykorgan
18:30 (UTC+6)	Ostapenko 8'; Kharabara (yellow card) 58'	Summary	Rozhkov (yellow card) 30'	Stadium: Zhetysu Stadium; Attendance: 4,000; Referee: Pavel Saliy

===== League table =====
Pos	Team	Pld	W	D	L	GF	GA	GD	Pts	Qualification
1	Zhetysu	22	15	4	3	39	16	+23	49	Qualification for the championship group
2	Astana (Note: Astana began the season as "Lokomotiv Astana" before being renamed in May 2011.)	22	13	6	3	35	19	+16	45	Qualification for the championship group
3	Shakhter Karagandy	22	13	3	6	35	20	+15	42	Qualification for the championship group
4	Aktobe	22	12	5	5	39	19	+20	41	Qualification for the championship group
5	Irtysh Pavlodar	22	11	3	8	38	34	+4	36	Qualification for the championship group

Source: kff.kz (in Russian)
Rules for classification: 1st points; 2nd overall wins; 3rd goal difference; 4th goals scored. The winners of the 2011 Kazakhstan Cup competition will qualify for the second qualifying round of the UEFA Europa League.

==== Championship Round ====
===== Results summary =====
Overall								Home						Away					
Pld	W	D	L	GF	GA	GD	Pts	W	D	L	GF	GA	GD	W	D	L	GF	GA	GD
10	3	1	6	15	18	−3	10	3	0	2	11	8	+3	0	1	4	4	10	−6

Last updated: 29 October 2011.
Source: See Results

===== Results =====
14 August 2011 1	Astana	1 – 2	Shakhter Karagandy	Astana
17:00 (UTC+6)	Bogavac 31' (pen.); Rozhkov (red card) 58'; Doroș (yellow card) 87'	Summary	Khizhnichenko 29' (yellow card) 86'; Utabayev (yellow card) 30' (goal) 64'; Konysbayev (yellow card) 58'	Stadium: Astana Arena; Attendance: 9,000; Referee: Ruslan Duzmambetov

20 August 2011 2	Zhetysu	1 – 0	Astana	Taldykorgan
18:30 (UTC+6)	Bakayev (yellow card) 44'; Mihajlov 61'	Summary	Karpovich (yellow card) 44'; Shakhmetov (yellow card) 71'	Stadium: Zhetysu Stadium; Attendance: 4,500; Referee: Akmalkhan Kholmatov

25 August 2011 3	Astana	5 – 1	Irtysh	Astana
19:00 (UTC+6)	Zhumaskaliyev 21'; Nusserbayev 47'; Bogavac 65', 74' (pen.); Bugaiov 72'	Summary	Ivanov (yellow card) 44'; Chernyshov (yellow card) 73'; Maltsev 79'	Stadium: Astana Arena; Attendance: 3,000; Referee: Kairat Slambekov

10 September 2011 4	Aktobe	1 – 1	Astana	Aktobe
19:00 (UTC+6)	Khairullin 38'; Đilas (yellow card) 40'; S.Lisenkov (yellow card) 73'; Kostić (yellow card) 88'	Summary	Zhumaskaliyev (yellow card) 59' (goal) 90'; Pakholyuk (yellow card) 70'; Božinovski (yellow card) 79'	Stadium: Central Stadium; Attendance: 8,000; Referee: Pavel Saliy

17 September 2011 5	Ordabasy	3 – 2	Astana	Shymkent
17:00 (UTC+6)	Tazhimbetov 17'; Kasyanov 27' (pen.), 80' (yellow card) 67'; Yevstigneyev (yellow card) 39' (yellow-red card) 77'	Summary	Nurdauletov 44' (yellow card) 77' (yellow-red card) 89'; Nusserbayev (yellow card) 52'; Shakhmetov (yellow card) 66'; Zhalmagambetov 68'; Pakholyuk (yellow card) 72'	Stadium: Kazhimukan Munaitpasov Stadium; Attendance: 3,000; Referee: Berik Rakhimbekov

24 September 2011 6	Astana	1 – 0	Zhetysu	Astana
17:00 (UTC+6)	Zhalmagambetov (yellow card) 9' (yellow-red card) 77'; Zhumaskaliyev 45+1'; Bogavac (yellow card) 90+2'	Summary		Stadium: Astana Arena; Attendance: 4,000; Referee: Anatolyi Vishnichenko

30 September 2011 7	Irtysh	3 – 1	Astana	Pavlodar
19:00 (UTC+6)	Asanbayev 3' (yellow card) 71'; Y.Akhmetov (yellow card) 30'; Coulibaly (yellow card) 36'; Chernyshov (yellow card) 53'; Maltsev 77'	Summary	Karpovich (yellow card) 36'; D.Dautov (yellow card) 58' (yellow-red card) 60'; Chernyshov 86' (o.g.)	Stadium: Pavlodar Central Stadium; Attendance: 4,200; Referee: Kairat Slambekov

15 October 2011 8	Astana	3 – 2	Aktobe	Astana
17:00 (UTC+6)	Karpovich (yellow card) 39'; Bugaiov 45', 65', 70' (yellow card) 54'; Shakhmetov (yellow card) 77' (yellow-red card) 87'	Summary	Mané 15'; Kenzhesariev (yellow card) 43'; Smakov (yellow card) 54'; Kostić 61'; P.Badlo (yellow card) 68'	Stadium: Astana Arena; Attendance: 7,000; Referee: Akmalkhan Kholmatov

22 October 2011 9	Astana	1 – 3	Ordabasy	Astana
17:00 (UTC+6)	Božinovski (yellow card) 48'; Bogavac 77'	Summary	Yevstigneyev 8'; T.Adyrbekov (yellow card) 16' (yellow-red card) 62'; Tazhimbetov 38', 47'; Nesterenko (yellow card) 59' (yellow-red card) 83'	Stadium: Astana Arena; Attendance: 5,000; Referee: Pavel Saliy

29 October 2011 10	Shakhter Karagandy	2 – 0	Astana	Karaganda
15:00 (UTC+6)	Khizhnichenko 18', 80'; Kukeyev (yellow card) 35'; Vasiljević (yellow card) 66'	Summary	Shomko (yellow card) 53'; Rozhkov (yellow card) 54'; Karpovich (yellow card) 66'; Bugaiov (yellow card) 69'; Shakhmetov (yellow card) 82'	Stadium: Shakhter Stadium; Attendance: 18,900; Referee: Kairat Slambekov

===== Table =====
Pos	Team	Pld	W	D	L	GF	GA	GD	Pts	Qualification or relegation
2	Zhetysu	32	19	5	8	51	27	+24	38	Qualification for the Europa League first qualifying round (Note: The winners of the 2011 Kazakhstan Cup competition will qualify for the first qualifying round of the UEFA Europa League.)
3	Aktobe	32	15	9	8	53	31	+22	34	Qualification for the Europa League first qualifying round
4	Astana (Note: Astana began the season as "Lokomotiv Astana" before being renamed in May 2011.)	32	16	7	9	50	37	+13	33	
5	Irtysh Pavlodar	32	15	5	12	50	50	0	32	
6	Ordabasy	32	11	10	11	41	36	+5	28	Qualification for the Europa League first qualifying round

Source: kff.kz (in Russian)
Rules for classification: 1st points; 2nd overall wins; 3rd goal difference; 4th goals scored.

=== Kazakhstan Cup ===
20 April 2011 Second Round	Astana	1 – 1 (a.e.t.) (2 – 4 p)	Kairat	Astana
18:30 (UTC+6)	Bugaiov 89'; Bogavac (yellow card) 115'	Summary; Report	I.Vorotnikov (yellow card) 18'; Fomin 75'; Shestakov (yellow card) 119'	Stadium: Astana Arena; Attendance: 2,500; Referee: Anatolyi Vishnichenko
	Penalties
	Aliev (penalty missed); Rozhkov (penalty missed); Bugaiov (penalty scored); Shakhmetov (penalty scored)		Baltiev (penalty missed); Strukov (penalty scored); Kirylchyk (penalty scored); Y.Kostrub (penalty scored); Golovskoy (penalty scored)

== Squad statistics ==
As of match played 29 October 2011

=== Appearances and goals ===
No.	Pos	Nat	Player	Total		Premier League		Kazakhstan Cup		Kazakhstan Super Cup	
No.	Pos	Nat	Player	Apps	Goals	Apps	Goals	Apps	Goals	Apps	Goals
1	GK	(Serbia) SRB	Nenad Erić	32	0	31	0	1	0	0	0
2	DF	(Kazakhstan) KAZ	Damir Dautov	23	0	8+13	0	0+1	0	0+1	0
4	DF	(Kazakhstan) KAZ	Maksim Zhalmagambetov	11	1	5+6	1	0	0	0	0
5	DF	(Kazakhstan) KAZ	Piraliy Aliev	26	1	23+2	1	1	0	0	0
6	DF	(Kazakhstan) KAZ	Kairat Nurdauletov	33	1	31	1	1	0	1	0
7	FW	(Moldova) MDA	Anatolie Doroș	13	0	6+7	0	0	0	0	0
8	MF	(Kazakhstan) KAZ	Andrei Karpovich	10	0	9	0	0	0	1	0
9	MF	(Kazakhstan) KAZ	Nurbol Zhumaskaliyev	33	10	31	10	1	0	1	0
10	FW	(Moldova) MDA	Igor Bugaiov	28	10	25+1	7	1	1	1	2
11	FW	(Montenegro) MNE	Dragan Bogavac	28	12	25+1	12	1	0	1	0
14	FW	(Ukraine) UKR	Roman Pakholyuk	9	0	3+6	0	0	0	0	0
15	MF	(North Macedonia) MKD	Bobi Božinovski	17	0	5+11	0	1	0	0	0
17	FW	(Kazakhstan) KAZ	Tanat Nusserbayev	26	7	21+4	7	1	0	0	0
18	MF	(Kazakhstan) KAZ	Maksim Azovskiy	24	0	9+13	0	1	0	1	0
19	DF	(Kazakhstan) KAZ	Mark Gorman	33	1	31	1	1	0	1	0
20	DF	(Kazakhstan) KAZ	Dmitri Shomko	12	0	4+7	0	0	0	1	0
22	MF	(Kazakhstan) KAZ	Marat Shakhmetov	29	3	26+1	3	0+1	0	0+1	0
27	DF	(Kazakhstan) KAZ	Mikhail Rozhkov	28	2	26	2	1	0	1	0
40	FW	(Kazakhstan) KAZ	Denis Prokopenko	3	0	0+3	0	0	0	0	0
55	GK	(Russia) RUS	Aleksei Belkin	2	0	1	0	0	0	1	0
Players away from Astana on loan:
7	MF	(Kazakhstan) KAZ	Ulan Konysbayev	13	0	4+7	0	0+1	0	0+1	0
13	FW	(Serbia) SRB	Danilo Belić	1	0	1	0	0	0	0	0
Players who appeared for Astana that left during the season:
3	DF	(Kazakhstan) KAZ	Aleksandr Kirov	9	0	4+4	0	0	0	1	0
8	DF	(Kazakhstan) KAZ	Ivan Shevchenko	6	0	2+4	0	0	0	0	0
12	DF	(Russia) RUS	Zaurbek Pliyev	22	1	21	1	1	0	0	0

=== Goal scorers ===
Place	Position	Nation	Number	Name	Premier League	Kazakhstan Cup	Kazakhstan Super Cup	Total
1	FW	(Montenegro)	11	Dragan Bogavac	12	0	0	12
2	MF	(Kazakhstan)	9	Nurbol Zhumaskaliyev	10	0	0	10
2	FW	(Moldova)	10	Igor Bugaiov	7	1	2	10
4	FW	(Kazakhstan)	17	Tanat Nusserbayev	7	0	0	7
5	MF	(Kazakhstan)	22	Marat Shakhmetov	3	0	0	3
5	MF	(Kazakhstan)	7	Ulan Konysbayev	3	0	0	3
7	DF	(Kazakhstan)	27	Mikhail Rozhkov	2	0	0	2
8	DF	(Kazakhstan)	5	Piraliy Aliev	1	0	0	1
8	DF	(Russia)	12	Zaurbek Pliyev	1	0	0	1
8	DF	(Kazakhstan)	19	Mark Gorman	1	0	0	1
8	DF	(Kazakhstan)	6	Kairat Nurdauletov	1	0	0	1
8	DF	(Kazakhstan)	4	Maksim Zhalmagambetov	1	0	0	1
8				Own goal	1	0	0	1
				TOTALS	50	1	2	53

=== Clean sheets ===
Place	Position	Nation	Number	Name	Premier League	Kazakhstan Cup	Kazakhstan Super Cup	Total
1	GK	(Serbia)	1	Nenad Erić	12	0	0	12
				TOTALS	12	0	0	12

=== Disciplinary record ===
Number	Nation	Position	Name	Premier League		Kazakhstan Cup		Kazakhstan Super Cup		Total	
Number	Nation	Position	Name	Yellow card	Red card	Yellow card	Red card	Yellow card	Red card	Yellow card	Red card
1	(Serbia)	GK	Nenad Erić	1	0	0	0	0	0	1	0
2	(Kazakhstan)	DF	Damir Dautov	3	1	0	0	0	0	3	1
4	(Kazakhstan)	DF	Maksim Zhalmagambetov	3	1	0	0	0	0	3	1
5	(Kazakhstan)	DF	Piraliy Aliev	4	0	0	0	0	0	4	0
6	(Kazakhstan)	DF	Kairat Nurdauletov	4	1	0	0	0	0	4	1
7	(Moldova)	FW	Anatolie Doroș	1	0	0	0	0	0	1	0
8	(Kazakhstan)	MF	Andrei Karpovich	4	0	0	0	0	0	4	0
9	(Kazakhstan)	MF	Nurbol Zhumaskaliyev	4	0	0	0	0	0	4	0
10	(Moldova)	FW	Igor Bugaiov	3	0	0	0	0	0	3	0
11	(Montenegro)	FW	Dragan Bogavac	1	0	1	0	0	0	2	0
14	(Ukraine)	FW	Roman Pakholyuk	3	0	0	0	0	0	3	0
15	(North Macedonia)	MF	Bobi Božinovski	3	0	0	0	0	0	3	0
17	(Kazakhstan)	FW	Tanat Nusserbayev	2	0	0	0	0	0	2	0
19	(Kazakhstan)	DF	Mark Gorman	1	0	0	0	0	0	1	0
20	(Kazakhstan)	DF	Dmitri Shomko	1	0	0	0	0	0	1	0
22	(Kazakhstan)	MF	Marat Shakhmetov	7	1	0	0	0	0	7	1
27	(Kazakhstan)	DF	Mikhail Rozhkov	2	2	0	0	0	0	2	2
Players who left Astana during the season:
7	(Kazakhstan)	MF	Ulan Konysbayev	1	1	0	0	0	0	1	1
8	(Kazakhstan)	DF	Ivan Shevchenko	1	0	0	0	0	0	1	0
12	(Russia)	DF	Zaurbek Pliyev	5	0	0	0	0	0	5	0
			TOTALS	54	7	1	0	0	0	55	7
