= 2010 FC Lokomotiv Astana season =

FC Lokomotiv Astana
2010 season
- Chairman: Kaisar Bekenov
- Manager: Holger Fach
- Stadium: Astana Arena
- Premier League: 4th
- Kazakhstan Cup: Champions
- Top goalscorer: League: Igor Bugaiov (11); All: Igor Bugaiov (16)
- Highest home attendance: 7,500 vs Ordabasy (26 July 2010) vs Aktobe (11 September 2010)
- Lowest home attendance: 1,000 vs Okzhetpes (25 May 2010)
- Average home league attendance: 4,505 (9 November 2010)
Home colours	Away colours

The 2010 Lokomotiv Astana season was the second successive season that the club played in the Kazakhstan Premier League, the highest tier of association football in Kazakhstan.

== Squad ==
As of match played 14 November 2010

No.	Name	Nationality	Position	Date of birth (age)	Signed from	Signed in	Apps.	Goals
Goalkeepers
1	Arslan Satubaldin	(Turkmenistan)	GK	11 August 1984 (aged 26)	Taraz	2010	0	0
16	Roman Tsyganovkin	(Kazakhstan)	GK	23 September 1990 (aged 20)	Academy	2010	0	0
21	Beybitzhan Mamraimov	(Kazakhstan)	GK	1 January 1992 (aged 18)	Academy	2010	0	0
55	Aleksei Belkin	(Russia)	GK	25 November 1981 (aged 28)	Volga Tver	2010	13	0
77	Roman Gerus	(Russia)	GK	14 September 1980 (aged 30)	Rostov	2010	24	0
Defenders
2	Damir Dautov	(Kazakhstan)	DF	3 March 1990 (aged 20)	Academy	2009	30	2
4	Vlade Lazarevski	(North Macedonia)	DF	9 June 1983 (aged 27)	Academy	2009	9	0
5	Maksim Samchenko	(Kazakhstan)	DF	5 May 1979 (aged 31)	Shakhter Karagandy	2009	50	0
6	Kairat Nurdauletov	(Kazakhstan)	DF	6 November 1982 (aged 28)	Tobol	2010	20	1
8	Ivan Shevchenko	(Kazakhstan)	DF	10 September 1987 (aged 23)	Shakhter Karagandy	2010	8	0
14	Aleksandr Kirov	(Kazakhstan)	DF	4 September 1984 (aged 26)	Atyrau	2010	36	3
19	Mark Gorman	(Kazakhstan)	DF	9 February 1989 (aged 21)	Hapoel Petah Tikva	2010	16	0
27	Mikhail Rozhkov	(Kazakhstan)	DF	27 December 1983 (aged 26)	Rostov	2010	35	2
33	Arsen Inkarbekov	(Kazakhstan)	DF	27 February 1991 (aged 19)	Academy	2010	0	0
35	Zhanat Zakirov	(Kazakhstan)	DF	22 September 1992 (aged 18)	Academy	2010	0	0
43	Ivan Navrotsky	(Kazakhstan)	DF	2 March 1992 (aged 18)	Academy	2010	0	0
46	Abdumutam Zholdasov	(Kazakhstan)	DF	24 September 1989 (aged 21)	Academy	2010	0	0
47	Erbol Musabaev	(Kazakhstan)	DF	2 March 1992 (aged 18)	Academy	2010	0	0
Midfielders
7	Zhambyl Kukeyev	(Kazakhstan)	MF	20 September 1988 (aged 22)	Alma-Ata	2009	41	5
9	Valeriu Andronic	(Moldova)	MF	21 December 1982 (aged 27)	Bohemians Prague	2010	32	8
15	Vyacheslav Erbes	(Kazakhstan)	MF	14 April 1988 (aged 22)	Vostok	2010	2	0
17	Bobi Bozhinovski	(North Macedonia)	MF	24 February 1981 (aged 29)	Rabotnički	2010	18	1
22	Marat Shakhmetov	(Kazakhstan)	MF	6 February 1989 (aged 21)	Alma-Ata	2009	48	1
32	Olzhas Spanov	(Kazakhstan)	MF	30 November 1989 (aged 20)	Academy	2010	17	2
38	Askat Baimuldaev	(Kazakhstan)	MF	8 January 1990 (aged 20)	Academy	2010	0	0
39	Islambek Kuat	(Kazakhstan)	MF	12 January 1993 (aged 17)	Academy	2010	0	0
44	Baikonyr Idrisov	(Kazakhstan)	MF	12 April 1991 (aged 19)	Academy	2010	0	0
45	Anuar Isaev	(Kazakhstan)	MF	27 June 1989 (aged 21)	Academy	2010	0	0
46	Serik Zaynalov	(Kazakhstan)	MF	29 January 1992 (aged 18)	Academy	2010	0	0
47	Dmitry Kaminsky	(Kazakhstan)	MF	10 March 1993 (aged 17)	Academy	2010	0	0
48	Zhumazhan Musabekov	(Kazakhstan)	MF	4 December 1992 (aged 17)	Academy	2010	0	0
49	Kirill Sazonov	(Kazakhstan)	MF	25 February 1993 (aged 17)	Academy	2010	0	0
50	Azat Smagulov	(Kazakhstan)	MF	31 July 1992 (aged 18)	Academy	2010	0	0
Forwards
10	Igor Bugaiov	(Moldova)	FW	26 June 1984 (aged 26)	Metalurh Zaporizhya	2010	36	16
11	Roman Pakholyuk	(Ukraine)	FW	20 September 1988 (aged 22)	Kaisar	2009	51	7
18	Maksim Azovskiy	(Kazakhstan)	FW	2 April 1990 (aged 20)	Zhetysu	2010	35	0
23	Sergei Ostapenko	(Kazakhstan)	FW	23 February 1986 (aged 24)	Aktobe	2010	32	6
37	Yerzhan Mukhamedin	(Kazakhstan)	FW	2 September 1990 (aged 20)	Academy	2010	0	0
40	Denis Prokopenko	(Kazakhstan)	FW	5 October 1991 (aged 19)	Academy	2010	0	0
41	Stanislav Miroshnichenko	(Kazakhstan)	FW	10 June 1993 (aged 17)	Academy	2010	0	0
51	Bimuhamed Bukeev	(Kazakhstan)	FW	2 July 1993 (aged 17)	Academy	2010	0	0
52	Jaba Jamarishvili	(Kazakhstan)	FW	18 August 1992 (aged 18)	Academy	2010	0	0
53	Yerlan Turashbaev	(Kazakhstan)	FW	16 September 1991 (aged 19)	Academy	2010	0	0
Players away on loan
8	Sergei Khizhnichenko	(Kazakhstan)	FW	17 July 1991 (aged 19)	Vostok	2010	16	2
Players that left during the season
4	Denis Ilescu	(Moldova)	DF	20 January 1987 (aged 23)	Academia Chișinău	2010	17	0
16	Rinat Abdulin	(Kazakhstan)	DF	14 April 1982 (aged 28)	Kairat	2009	26	1
17	Talgat Adyrbekov	(Kazakhstan)	DF	26 January 1989 (aged 21)	Vostok	2009	4	0
31	Olzhas Kerimzhanov	(Kazakhstan)	FW	16 May 1989 (aged 21)	Academy	2009	1	0

== Transfers ==
=== Winter ===
In: Note: Flags indicate national team as defined under FIFA eligibility rules; some limited exceptions apply. Players may hold more than one non-FIFA nationality.

No.	Pos.	Nation	Player
4	DF	MDA	Denis Ilescu (from (Moldova) Academia Chișinău)
8	FW	KAZ	Sergei Khizhnichenko (from (Kazakhstan) Vostok)
9	MF	MDA	Valeriu Andronic (from (Czech Republic) Bohemians Prague)
10	FW	MDA	Igor Bugaiov (from (Ukraine) Metalurh Zaporizhya)
14	DF	KAZ	Aleksandr Kirov (from (Kazakhstan) Atyrau)
15	MF	KAZ	Vyacheslav Erbes ( (Kazakhstan) Vostok)
18	FW	KAZ	Maksim Azovskiy (from (Kazakhstan) Zhetysu)
19	DF	KAZ	Mark Gorman (from (Israel) Hapoel Petah Tikva)
23	FW	KAZ	Sergei Ostapenko (from (Kazakhstan) Aktobe)
27	DF	KAZ	Mikhail Rozhkov (from (Russia) Rostov)
55	GK	RUS	Aleksei Belkin (from (Russia) Volga Tver)
77	GK	RUS	Roman Gerus (from (Russia) Rostov)

Out: Note: Flags indicate national team as defined under FIFA eligibility rules; some limited exceptions apply. Players may hold more than one non-FIFA nationality.

No.	Pos.	Nation	Player
1	GK	KAZ	David Loria (loan return to (Russia) Spartak Nalchik)
2	MF	KAZ	Maksat Baizhanov (to (Kazakhstan) Aktobe)
3	DF	KAZ	Pavel Ateoschenko
4	DF	NGR	Patrick Ovie (Retired)
5	DF	KAZ	Igor Avdeyev (Retired)
7	MF	KAZ	Ruslan Sakhalbaev (to (Kazakhstan) Atyrau)
8	MF	KAZ	Kairat Ashirbekov (to (Kazakhstan) Ordabasy)
9	MF	RUS	Yegor Titov (Retired)
10	FW	KAZ	Daniyar Khasenov (Retired)
11	MF	RUS	Andrey Tikhonov (to (Russia) Khimki)
12	MF	SRB	Marko Mitrović (to (Serbia) Smederevo 1924)
13	DF	KAZ	Arken Jakubbekov
15	FW	KAZ	Aleksandr Shatskikh (Retired)
16	FW	UZB	Maksim Shatskikh (to (Ukraine) Arsenal Kyiv)
17	MF	KAZ	Timur Khalmuratov
18	FW	KAZ	Kanat Bolatov
20	MF	KAZ	Andrei Karpovich (to (Kazakhstan) Aktobe)
23	MF	KAZ	Zakhar Korobov (to (Kazakhstan) Zhetysu)
24	GK	KAZ	Denis Tolebaev (to (Kazakhstan) Kazakhmys)
27	MF	KAZ	Nursultan Kenenov
28	FW	KAZ	Shyngyskhan Kudaybergenov
32	GK	KAZ	Roman Nesterenko (to (Kazakhstan) Kaisar)
34	DF	KAZ	Sergey Yakushin
35	FW	KAZ	Arman Khalykov
36	DF	KAZ	Timur Kasymov
40	MF	KAZ	Abzal Beisebekov (to (Kazakhstan) Kairat)
43	DF	KAZ	Ussov Beekzat
44	FW	KAZ	Asyl Senbayuly
66	MF	KAZ	Victor Kryukov
71	GK	KAZ	Maksat Seydahmet
77	FW	KAZ	Talgat Adyrbekov (to (Kazakhstan) Okzhetpes)
80	MF	KAZ	Madiyar Muminov (to (Kazakhstan) Ordabasy)
88	MF	KAZ	Dauren Sydykov
90	GK	KAZ	Akhan Inkarbekov

=== Summer ===
In: Note: Flags indicate national team as defined under FIFA eligibility rules; some limited exceptions apply. Players may hold more than one non-FIFA nationality.

No.	Pos.	Nation	Player
1	GK	TKM	Arslan Satubaldin (from (Kazakhstan) Tobol)
4	DF	MKD	Vlade Lazarevski (from (Croatia) Rijeka)
6	DF	KAZ	Kairat Nurdauletov (from (Kazakhstan) Kairat)
8	DF	KAZ	Ivan Shevchenko (from (Kazakhstan) Shakhter Karagandy)
17	MF	MKD	Bobi Božinovski (from (North Macedonia) Rabotnički)

Out: Note: Flags indicate national team as defined under FIFA eligibility rules; some limited exceptions apply. Players may hold more than one non-FIFA nationality.

No.	Pos.	Nation	Player
4	DF	MDA	Denis Ilescu (to (Moldova) Dacia Chișinău)
8	FW	KAZ	Sergei Khizhnichenko (loan to (Kazakhstan) Atyrau)
16	DF	KAZ	Rinat Abdulin (to (Kazakhstan) Tobol)
17	DF	KAZ	Talgat Adyrbekov (to (Kazakhstan) Okzhetpes)
31	DF	KAZ	Olzhas Kerimzhanov (to (Kazakhstan) Okzhetpes)

== Competitions ==
=== Premier League ===
==== First round ====
===== Results summary =====
Overall								Home						Away					
Pld	W	D	L	GF	GA	GD	Pts	W	D	L	GF	GA	GD	W	D	L	GF	GA	GD
22	11	3	8	33	21	+12	36	9	1	1	21	1	+20	2	2	7	12	20	−8

Last updated: 14 August 2010.
Source: See Results

===== Results =====
22 March 2010 1	Lokomotiv Astana	0 – 0	Kairat	Astana
17:00 (UTC+6)	Rozhkov (yellow card) 54'; Bugaiov (yellow card) 87'	Summary	V.Sobolev (yellow card) 10'; Fomin (yellow card) 34'; Bogomolov (yellow card) 90'	Stadium: Astana Arena; Attendance: 3,800; Referee: Aleksei Bobrov

28 March 2010 2	Okzhetpes	2 – 1	Lokomotiv Astana	Kokshetau
15:00 (UTC+6)	Krutskevich (yellow card) 22'; Kuchma 59'; Y.Kabylbekov (yellow card) 72'; Y.Samokhin 85'	Summary	Rozhkov (yellow card) 10' (red card) 59'; Samchenko (yellow card) 68'; Bugaiov 89'	Stadium: Okzhetpes Stadium; Attendance: 2,000; Referee: Anatolyi Vishnichenko

3 April 2010 3	Lokomotiv Astana	3 – 0	Irtysh Pavlodar	Astana
17:00 (UTC+6)	Bugaiov 58', 64'; Ostapenko 80'	Summary		Stadium: Astana Arena; Attendance: 4,000; Referee: Igor Kister

9 April 2010 4	Taraz	1 – 0	Lokomotiv Astana	Taraz
15:00 (UTC+6)	O.Nedashkovski 42'; Milosavljević (yellow card) 57'; Haýdarow (yellow card) 77'	Summary	Abdulin (yellow card) 40'; Samchenko (yellow card) 85'	Stadium: Central Stadium; Attendance: 6,000; Referee: Gennadiy Zhukovskiy

15 April 2010 5	Lokomotiv Astana	1 – 0	Atyrau	Astana
19:00 (UTC+6)	Samchenko (yellow card) 8'; O.Kerimzhanov (yellow card) 35'; Bugaiov 72'	Summary	Mamonov (yellow card) 33'; V.Chureev (yellow card) 39'; T.Zununov (yellow card) 90'	Stadium: Astana Arena; Attendance: 3,500; Referee: Igor Aleshin

20 April 2010 6	Shakhter Karagandy	3 – 1	Lokomotiv Astana	Karaganda
19:00 (UTC+6)	Skorykh 28'; Kislitsyn (yellow card) 60'; Vičius 87'; S.Shaff 90'	Summary	Khizhnichenko 14'; Pakholyuk (yellow card) 67'	Stadium: Shakhter Stadium; Attendance: 12,000; Referee: Akmalkhan Kholmatov

25 April 2010 7	Lokomotiv Astana	0 – 1	Aktobe	Astana
16:00 (UTC+6)	Azovskiy (yellow card) 63'	Summary	Karpovich (yellow card) 33'; Strukov 45'; Logvinenko (yellow card) 71'	Stadium: Astana Arena; Attendance: 7,000; Referee: Kairat Slambekov

1 May 2010 8	Tobol	0 – 1	Lokomotiv Astana	Kostanay
17:00 (UTC+6)	Suyumagambetov (yellow card) 20'	Summary	Andronic 18' (yellow card) 73'; Samchenko (yellow card) 25'; Shakhmetov (yellow card) 53'; Ostapenko (yellow card) 69'; Ilescu (yellow card) 90'	Stadium: Central Stadium; Attendance: 7,000; Referee: Sergey Pasko

7 May 2010 9	Lokomotiv Astana	2 – 0	Akzhayik	Astana
19:00 (UTC+6)	Rozhkov (yellow card) 55'; Pakholyuk 79'; Andronic (yellow card) 82'; Ostapenko 90'	Summary	E.Abdrakhmanov (yellow card) 53'; Gaćeša (yellow card) 90+3'	Stadium: Astana Arena; Attendance: 5,500; Referee: Aleksandr Gauzer

12 May 2010 10	Ordabasy	3 – 1	Lokomotiv Astana	Shymkent
17:00 (UTC+6)	Trajković 32' (yellow card) 80'; Tazhimbetov (yellow card) 45'; Asanbayev 50'; Mitrofanov 90'	Summary	Ostapenko (yellow card) 23'; Khizhnichenko 74'; Ilescu (yellow card) 87'	Stadium: Kazhymukan Munaitpasov Stadium; Attendance: 4,000; Referee: Viktor Antonov

20 May 2010 11	Zhetysu	1 – 0	Lokomotiv Astana	Taldykorgan
18:30 (UTC+6)	Muzhikov 45' (yellow card) 88'; Solyanyk (yellow card) 78' (yellow-red card) 90+3'; Belić (yellow card) 83'	Summary	Pakholyuk (yellow card) 9'	Stadium: Zhetysu Stadium; Attendance: 1,300; Referee: Ruslan Duzmambetov

25 May 2010 12	Lokomotiv Astana	4 – 0	Okzhetpes	Astana
19:00 (UTC+6)	Kirov 25'; Rozhkov (yellow card) 29'; Andronic 47'; Ostapenko 55'; Kukeyev 79' (pen.); Khizhnichenko (yellow card) 81'	Summary	Novikov (yellow card) 90'	Stadium: Astana Arena; Attendance: 1,000; Referee: Bolat Karlibayev

30 May 2010 13	Irtysh Pavlodar	3 – 1	Lokomotiv Astana	Pavlodar
15:00 (UTC+6)	Daskalov 13', 36'; Zhalmagambetov (yellow card) 15'; Ivanov (yellow card) 44' (goal) 65'; Shomko (yellow card) 55'	Summary	Khizhnichenko (yellow card) 15'; Andronic (yellow card) 22'; Pakholyuk 67'; Kukeyev (yellow card) 78'	Stadium: Central Stadium; Attendance: 5,300; Referee: Gennadiy Zhukovskiy

8 June 2010 14	Lokomotiv Astana	3 – 0	Taraz	Astana
19:00 (UTC+6)	Andronic 22', 73'; Bugaiov 27'	Summary	Milosavljević (yellow card) 34'	Stadium: Astana Arena; Attendance: 4,500; Referee: Akmalkhan Kholmatov

13 June 2010 15	Atyrau	2 – 1	Lokomotiv Astana	Atyrau
18:30 (UTC+6)	Frunză 9' (pen.), 40' (yellow card) 62'; Croitoru (yellow card) 12'; Zhumabaev (yellow card) 34'; E.Kostrub (yellow card) 51'	Summary	Shakhmetov (yellow card) 22'; Andronic 36'; Pakholyuk (yellow card) 42'	Stadium: Munaishy Stadium; Attendance: 4,000; Referee: Kairat Slambekov

17 June 2010 16	Lokomotiv Astana	4 – 0	Shakhter Karagandy	Astana
19:00 (UTC+6)	Kirov 37'; O.Spanov 54'; Bugaiov 68'; Gerus (yellow card) 84'; Božinovski 90'	Summary	Kislitsyn	Stadium: Astana Arena; Attendance: 4,500; Referee: Viktor Antonov

22 June 2010 17	Aktobe	1 – 2	Lokomotiv Astana	Aktobe
20:00 (UTC+6)	M.Kurmashev 31'	Summary	Bugaiov 56' (pen.); Ostapenko 89'	Stadium: Central Stadium; Attendance: 8,000; Referee: Sergey Gorokhovodatskiy

27 June 2010 18	Lokomotiv Astana	2 – 0	Tobol	Astana
17:00 (UTC+6)	Andronic 48'; Pakholyuk (yellow card) 62'; Bugaiov 73' (yellow card) 82'	Summary	Kharabara (yellow card) 5'; V.Turtenwald (yellow card) 30'; Mukanov (yellow card) 74'; E.Kuantayev (yellow card) 82'	Stadium: Astana Arena; Attendance: 7,000; Referee: Sergey Pasko

18 July 2010 19	Akzhayik	2 – 2	Lokomotiv Astana	Oral
20:00 (UTC+6)	A.Maltsev 26'; Sakyi (yellow card) 88' (goal) 90'	Summary	O.Spanov 39' (yellow card) 58'; Bugaiov 56' (pen.)	Stadium: Petr Atoyan Stadium; Attendance: 4,000; Referee: Viktor Antonov

26 July 2010 20	Lokomotiv Astana	1 – 0	Ordabasy	Astana
19:00 (UTC+6)	Shakhmetov 39'; Pakholyuk (yellow card) 51'; Rozhkov (yellow card) 83'	Summary	Vagner (yellow card) 38'; M.Muminov (yellow card) 58'	Stadium: Astana Arena; Attendance: 7,500; Referee: Igor Khisamutdinov

1 August 2010 21	Lokomotiv Astana	1 – 0	Zhetysu	Astana
18:00 (UTC+6)	Andronic 72'; Lazarevski (yellow card) 86'	Summary	Z.Korobov (yellow card) 31'; Rodionov (yellow card) 34'; Parkhachev (yellow card) 59'; Kovalev (yellow card) 85'	Stadium: Astana Arena; Attendance: 7,000; Referee: Igor Aleshin

14 August 2010 22	Kairat	2 – 2	Lokomotiv Astana	Almaty
18:00 (UTC+6)	K.Zotov (yellow card) 28'; Kutsov (yellow card) 72'; Sobolev (yellow card) 88'; Erić (yellow card) 90'; Fomin 90+2'; C.Abugaliyev 90+3' (yellow card) 90+3'	Summary	Pakholyuk 21'; Bugaiov (yellow card) 45'; Božinovski (yellow card) 90'; Ostapenko 90+1'	Stadium: Central Stadium; Attendance: 1,000; Referee: Pavel Saliy

==== Championship round ====
===== Results summary =====
Overall								Home						Away					
Pld	W	D	L	GF	GA	GD	Pts	W	D	L	GF	GA	GD	W	D	L	GF	GA	GD
10	3	5	2	8	7	+1	14	1	3	1	5	4	+1	2	2	1	3	3	0

Last updated: 6 November 2010.
Source: See Results

===== Results =====
22 August 2010 23	Irtysh Pavlodar	0 – 1	Lokomotiv Astana	Pavlodar
18:00 (UTC+6)	Shabalin (yellow card) 25'; Nikolić (yellow card) 80'	Summary	Božinovski (yellow card) 24'; Bugaiov (yellow card) 80'; Rozhkov 88'; Gerus (yellow card) 90+2'	Stadium: Central Stadium; Attendance: 4,200; Referee: Sergey Pasko

11 September 2010 24	Lokomotiv Astana	2 – 2	Aktobe	Astana
17:00 (UTC+6)	Ostapenko 24' (yellow card) 50'; Nurdauletov 33'	Summary	Tleshev 23'; Bono (yellow card) 27'; Kenzhesariyev (yellow card) 56' (goal) 85'	Stadium: Astana Arena; Attendance: 7,500; Referee: Ruslan Duzmambetov

17 September 2010 25	Shakhter Karagandy	0 – 1	Lokomotiv Astana	Karaganda
19:00 (UTC+6)	A.Borantaev (yellow card) 17'; Đidić (yellow card) 26' (yellow-red card) 85'	Summary	Azovskiy (yellow card) 26'; Kirov 45'; Shakhmetov (yellow card) 79'; O.Spanov (yellow card) 81'	Stadium: Shakhter Stadium; Attendance: 10,000; Referee: Sergey Gorokhovodatskiy

22 September 2010 26	Atyrau	0 – 0	Lokomotiv Astana	Atyrau
18:00 (UTC+6)	Frunză (yellow card) 15'; Larin (yellow card) 75'	Summary	Gorman (yellow card) 66'	Stadium: Munaishy Stadium; Attendance: 4,000; Referee: Bolat Karlibayev

30 September 2010 27	Lokomotiv Astana	0 – 0	Tobol	Astana
19:00 (UTC+6)	Gorman (yellow card) 87'	Summary	A.Malyshev (yellow card) 59'; Levyha (yellow card) 62'; Petukhov (yellow card) 65'; Lotov (yellow card) 70'	Stadium: Astana Arena; Attendance: 4,800; Referee: Aydin Rakhimbayev

15 October 2010 28	Aktobe	1 – 1	Lokomotiv Astana	Aktobe
20:00 (UTC+6)	Chichulin (yellow card) 36'; Tleshev (yellow card) 63'; Khairullin (yellow card) 65'; Kenzhesariyev 67'	Summary	Azovskiy (yellow card) 33'; Pakholyuk 50' (yellow card) 71'; Lazarevski (yellow card) 81'	Stadium: Central Stadium; Attendance: 10,000; Referee: Sergey Pasko

22 October 2010 29	Lokomotiv Astana	1 – 1	Shakhter Karagandy	Astana
19:00 (UTC+6)	Bugaiov 2'; Shakhmetov (yellow card) 66'	Summary	Đidić (yellow card) 11' (goal) 24'; Y.Tarasov (yellow card) 85'	Stadium: Astana Arena; Attendance: 3,000; Referee: Pavel Saliy

27 October 2010 30	Lokomotiv Astana	2 – 0	Atyrau	Astana
20:00 (UTC+6)	Bugaiov 54'; D.Dautov 90+1'	Summary	Aliev (yellow card) 31'; A.Shakin (yellow card) 59'	Stadium: Astana Arena; Attendance: 3,000; Referee: Aydin Rakhimbayev

1 November 2010 31	Tobol	2 – 0	Lokomotiv Astana	Kostanay
19:00 (UTC+6)	Bakayev 31' (pen.); E.Kuantayev 86'	Summary	Lazarevski (yellow card) 82'	Stadium: Central Stadium; Attendance: 7,000; Referee: Aleksandr Gauzer

6 November 2010 32	Lokomotiv Astana	0 – 1	Irtysh Pavlodar	Astana
18:00 (UTC+6)	Shakhmetov (yellow card) 59'; Rozhkov (yellow card) 72'; D.Dautov (yellow card) 86'	Summary	Chernyshov (yellow card) 63'; V.Goloveshkin 83'	Stadium: Astana Arena; Attendance: 3,000; Referee: Sergey Pasko

==== Final league table ====
Pos	Team	Pld	W	D	L	GF	GA	GD	Pts	Qualification or relegation
2	Aktobe	32	19	6	7	56	30	+26	63	Qualification for the Europa League second qualifying round (Note: Because Lokomotiv Astana, the winners of the 2010 Kazakhstan Cup, did not exist for at least three years and could not obtain a UEFA license, the second-placed team of the league, Aktobe, moved up to enter the second qualifying round, and the cup runners-up, Shakhter Karagandy, claimed the vacant Europa League spot in the first qualifying round.)
3	Irtysh Pavlodar	32	16	8	8	39	30	+9	56	Qualification for the Europa League first qualifying round
4	Lokomotiv	32	14	8	10	41	28	+13	50	
5	Atyrau	32	13	5	14	36	44	−8	44	
6	Shakhter Karagandy	32	11	8	13	32	30	+2	41	Qualification for the Europa League first qualifying round

Source: kff.kz (in Russian)
Rules for classification: 1st points; 2nd overall wins; 3rd goal difference; 4th goals scored.

=== Kazakhstan Cup ===
16 May 2010 Third Round	Tsesna	0 – 3	Lokomotiv Astana	Almaty
16:00 (UTC+6)		Report	Andronic 9'; Shakhmetov (yellow card) 35'; Bugaiov 68', 89'; Samchenko (yellow card) 80'	Attendance: 600; Referee: Abdanbayev

26 September 2010 Quarterfinal	Lokomotiv Astana	1 – 0	Taraz	Astana
17:00 (UTC+6)	Bugaiov 39'; Božinovski (yellow card) 90+2'	Report	A.Anarmetov (yellow card) 77'; Tonev (yellow card) 83'; Milosavljević (yellow card) 90+4'	Stadium: Astana Arena; Attendance: 3,000; Referee: Akmalkhan Kholmatov

18 October 2010 Semifinal 1st leg	Zhetysu	0 – 1	Lokomotiv Astana	Taldykorgan
18:00 (UTC+6)	Baizhanov (yellow card) 44'	Report	Bugaiov 51' (pen.) (yellow card) 87'; Samchenko (yellow card) 75'; I.Shevchenko (yellow card) 90'	Stadium: Zhetysu Stadium; Attendance: 1,800; Referee: Bolat Karlibayev

9 November 2010 Semifinal 2nd leg	Lokomotiv Astana	1 – 0 (2 – 0 agg.)	Zhetysu	Astana
19:00 (UTC+6)	Bugaiov 24'	Report	Fomitchev (yellow card) 8'; V.Yakovlev (yellow card) 14' (yellow-red card) 60'; Kumisbekov (red card) 85'	Stadium: Astana Arena; Attendance: 1,500; Referee: Igor Kister

14 November 2010 Final	Lokomotiv Astana	1 – 0	Shakhter Karagandy	Astana
15:00 (UTC+6)	Rozhkov 34' (yellow card) 56'; Andronic (yellow card) 75'	Report	Bogdanov (yellow card) 13'	Stadium: Astana Arena; Attendance: 9,000; Referee: Igor Khisamutdinov

== Squad statistics ==
As of match played 14 November 2010

=== Appearances and goals ===
No.	Pos	Nat	Player	Total		Premier League		Kazakhstan Cup	
No.	Pos	Nat	Player	Apps	Goals	Apps	Goals	Apps	Goals
2	DF	(Kazakhstan) KAZ	Damir Dautov	8	1	5	1	3	0
4	DF	(North Macedonia) MKD	Vlade Lazarevski	9	0	8	0	1	0
5	DF	(Kazakhstan) KAZ	Maksim Samchenko	30	0	26	0	4	0
6	DF	(Kazakhstan) KAZ	Kairat Nurdauletov	20	1	17	1	3	0
7	MF	(Kazakhstan) KAZ	Zhambyl Kukeyev	18	1	18	1	0	0
8	DF	(Kazakhstan) KAZ	Ivan Shevchenko	8	0	6	0	2	0
9	MF	(Moldova) MDA	Valeriu Andronic	32	8	28	7	4	1
10	FW	(Moldova) MDA	Igor Bugaiov	36	16	31	11	5	5
11	FW	(Ukraine) UKR	Roman Pakholyuk	35	4	30	4	5	0
14	DF	(Kazakhstan) KAZ	Aleksandr Kirov	36	3	31	3	5	0
15	MF	(Kazakhstan) KAZ	Vyacheslav Erbes	2	0	2	0	0	0
17	MF	(North Macedonia) MKD	Bobi Božinovski	18	1	14	1	4	0
18	FW	(Kazakhstan) KAZ	Maksim Azovskiy	35	0	30	0	5	0
19	DF	(Kazakhstan) KAZ	Mark Gorman	16	0	12	0	4	0
22	MF	(Kazakhstan) KAZ	Marat Shakhmetov	34	1	29	1	5	0
23	FW	(Kazakhstan) KAZ	Sergei Ostapenko	32	6	27	6	5	0
27	DF	(Kazakhstan) KAZ	Mikhail Rozhkov	35	2	30	1	5	1
32	MF	(Kazakhstan) KAZ	Olzhas Spanov	17	2	15	2	2	0
55	GK	(Russia) RUS	Aleksei Belkin	13	0	9	0	4	0
77	GK	(Russia) RUS	Roman Gerus	24	0	23	0	1	0
Players away from Astana on loan:
8	FW	(Kazakhstan) KAZ	Sergei Khizhnichenko	16	2	15	2	1	0
Players who appeared for Astana that left during the season:
4	DF	(Moldova) MDA	Denis Ilescu	17	0	16	0	1	0
16	DF	(Kazakhstan) KAZ	Rinat Abdulin	8	0	8	0	0	0
17	DF	(Kazakhstan) KAZ	Talgat Adyrbekov	1	0	0	0	1	0
31	DF	(Kazakhstan) KAZ	Olzhas Kerimzhanov	9	0	9	0	0	0

=== Goal scorers ===
Place	Position	Nation	Number	Name	Premier League	Kazakhstan Cup	Total
1	FW	(Moldova)	10	Igor Bugaiov	11	5	16
2	MF	(Moldova)	9	Valeriu Andronic	7	1	8
3	FW	(Kazakhstan)	23	Sergei Ostapenko	6	0	6
4	FW	(Ukraine)	11	Roman Pakholyuk	4	0	4
5	DF	(Kazakhstan)	14	Aleksandr Kirov	3	0	3
6	MF	(Kazakhstan)	32	Olzhas Spanov	2	0	2
6	FW	(Kazakhstan)	8	Sergei Khizhnichenko	2	0	2
6	DF	(Kazakhstan)	27	Mikhail Rozhkov	1	1	2
9	DF	(Kazakhstan)	2	Damir Dautov	1	0	1
9	DF	(Kazakhstan)	6	Kairat Nurdauletov	1	0	1
9	MF	(North Macedonia)	17	Bobi Božinovski	1	0	1
9	MF	(Kazakhstan)	7	Zhambyl Kukeyev	1	0	1
9	MF	(Kazakhstan)	22	Marat Shakhmetov	1	0	1
				TOTALS	41	7	48

=== Clean sheets ===
Place	Position	Nation	Number	Name	Premier League	Kazakhstan Cup	Total
1	GK	(Russia)	77	Roman Gerus	12	1	13
2	GK	(Russia)	55	Aleksei Belkin	4	4	8
				TOTALS	16	5	21

=== Disciplinary record ===
Number	Nation	Position	Name	Premier League		Kazakhstan Cup		Total	
Number	Nation	Position	Name	Yellow card	Red card	Yellow card	Red card	Yellow card	Red card
2	(Kazakhstan)	DF	Damir Dautov	1	0	0	0	1	0
4	(Moldova)	DF	Denis Ilescu	2	0	0	0	2	0
4	(North Macedonia)	DF	Vlade Lazarevski	3	0	0	0	3	0
5	(Kazakhstan)	DF	Maksim Samchenko	4	0	2	0	6	0
7	(Kazakhstan)	MF	Zhambyl Kukeyev	1	0	0	0	1	0
8	(Kazakhstan)	DF	Ivan Shevchenko	0	0	1	0	1	0
8	(Kazakhstan)	FW	Sergei Khizhnichenko	2	0	0	0	2	0
9	(Moldova)	MF	Valeriu Andronic	3	0	1	0	4	0
10	(Moldova)	FW	Igor Bugaiov	4	0	1	0	5	0
11	(Ukraine)	FW	Roman Pakholyuk	6	0	0	0	6	0
17	(North Macedonia)	MF	Bobi Bozhinovski	2	0	1	0	3	0
18	(Kazakhstan)	FW	Maksim Azovskiy	3	0	0	0	3	0
19	(Kazakhstan)	DF	Mark Gorman	2	0	0	0	2	0
22	(Kazakhstan)	MF	Marat Shakhmetov	5	0	1	0	6	0
23	(Kazakhstan)	FW	Sergei Ostapenko	3	0	0	0	3	0
27	(Kazakhstan)	DF	Mikhail Rozhkov	7	1	1	0	8	1
32	(Kazakhstan)	MF	Olzhas Spanov	2	0	0	0	2	0
77	(Russia)	GK	Roman Gerus	2	0	0	0	2	0
Players who left Lokomotiv Astana during the season:
16	(Kazakhstan)	DF	Rinat Abdulin	1	0	0	0	1	0
31	(Kazakhstan)	DF	Olzhas Kerimzhanov	1	0	0	0	1	0
			TOTALS	54	1	8	0	62	1
