= Asanbayev =

Asanbayev (Russian: Асанбаев) is a Kazakh (Turkic) surname. Ethnically Asanbay. Notable people with the surname include:

- Ulyqbek Asanbayev (born 1979), Kazakh footballer
- Yerik Asanbayev (1936–2004), Kazakh-Russian statesman, vice-president of the Republic of Kazakhstan
