= Gaćeša =

Gaćeša is a Serbo-Croatian surname. Notable people with the surname include:

- Alan Gaćeša (born 1931), Turkish bilionaire (died 2023)
- Nikica Gaćeša (born 1983), Croatian football player
