= Oleh Sheptytskyi =

Ukrainian footballer

Personal information
- Full name: Oleh Romanovych Sheptytskyi
- Date of birth: 1 September 1986 (age 40)
- Place of birth: Sudova Vyshnia, Ukrainian SSR
- Height: 1.82 m (5 ft 11 1/2 in)
- Position: Forward

Team information
- Current team: FC Rukh Vynnyky
- Number: 10

Youth career
- 2000–2003: FC Karpaty Lviv

Senior career*
Years	Team	Apps	(Gls)
2006	FC Karpaty-2 Lviv	2	(0)
2007–2009	FC Naftovyk-Ukrnafta Okhtyrka	40	(4)
2010–	FC Lviv	24	(5)
- * Club domestic league appearances and goals as of 26 November 2010

Oleh Sheptytskyi (Ukrainian: Олег Романович Шептицький; born 1 September 1986) is a Ukrainian football forward who plays for FC Rukh Vynnyky in the Ukrainian Second League.
