= Alexandru Maxim (footballer, born 1986) =

Moldovan footballer (born 1986)

Personal information
- Full name: Alexandru Maxim
- Date of birth: 19 January 1986 (age 40)
- Place of birth: Chișinău, Moldovan SSR
- Height: 1.80 m (5 ft 11 in)
- Position: Midfielder

Youth career
- 2003–2004: Zimbru Chișinău

Senior career*
Years	Team	Apps	(Gls)
2004–2006	Zimbru Chișinău	4	(1)
2007	Politehnica Chișinău	3	(0)
2007	Rapid Ghidighici	3	(0)
2008	Dinamo Minsk	2	(0)
2008–2009	Gomel	17	(1)
2010–2013	Rapid Ghidighici	68	(10)
2011	→ Kaisar (loan)	14	(4)
2013–2014	Academia Chișinău	12	(3)
2015–2016	Speranța Nisporeni	15	(3)
2016	Spicul Chișcăreni	11	(8)
2017–2018	Sfântul Gheorghe Suruceni	25	(4)
2018	Speranța Nisporeni	4	(0)

International career
2015	Moldova	1	(0)
- * Club domestic league appearances and goals as of 31 December 2018

Alexandru Maxim (born 19 January 1986) is a Moldovan former professional footballer.
