= Mikhail Rozhkov =

Kazakhstani footballer

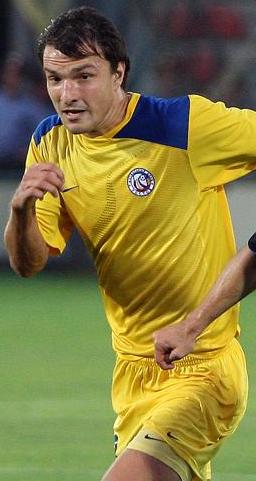

Personal information
- Full name: Mikhail Viktorovich Rozhkov
- Date of birth: 27 December 1983 (age 42)
- Place of birth: Moscow, Russian SFSR
- Height: 1.91 m (6 ft 3 in)
- Position: Defender

Youth career
- –2004: Burevestnik Moscow

Senior career*
Years	Team	Apps	(Gls)
2005	Alnas Almetyevsk	28	(3)
2006–2008	Nosta Novotroitsk	101	(14)
2009	Rostov	19	(1)
2010–2012	Astana	82	(7)

International career
2010–2012	Kazakhstan	15	(0)
- * Club domestic league appearances and goals

Mikhail Viktorovich Rozhkov (Russian: Михаил Викторович Рожков; born 27 December 1983) is a Kazakh former international footballer.

== Career ==
=== Club ===
During the 2009 preseason, he tried out with FC Dynamo Moscow and FC Moscow but ended up signing with FC Rostov. He made his debut in the Russian Premier League on 14 March 2009 in a game against FC Amkar Perm.

At the end of 2012 season, Rozhkov was involved in a car accident, that resulted him fracturing his hip and being in coma.

=== International ===
Rozhkov made his debut for Kazakhstan on 3 March 2010 against Moldova.

== Career statistics ==
=== Club ===
As of match played 11 November 2012

Appearances and goals by club, season and competition
Club	Season	League			National Cup		Other		Total	
Club	Season	Division	Apps	Goals	Apps	Goals	Apps	Goals	Apps	Goals
Rostov	2009	Russian Premier League	19	1	0	0	–		19	1
Lokomotiv Astana/Astana	2010	Kazakhstan Premier League	30	1	5	1	-		35	2
Lokomotiv Astana/Astana	2011	Kazakhstan Premier League	26	2	1	0	1	0	28	2
Lokomotiv Astana/Astana	2012	Kazakhstan Premier League	26	4	8	2	-		34	6
Lokomotiv Astana/Astana	Total		82	7	14	3	1	0	97	10
Career total			101	8	14	3	1	0	116	11

=== International ===
Kazakhstan
Year	Apps	Goals
2010	6	0
2011	4	0
2012	5	0
Total	15	0

Statistics accurate as of match played 12 October 2012
