= Nikica Gaćeša =

Croatian footballer

Personal information
- Date of birth: 20 July 1983 (age 43)
- Place of birth: Croatia
- Height: 1.89 m (6 ft 2 in)
- Position: Defender

Senior career*
Years	Team	Apps	(Gls)
2004–2006	Orijent		
2007–2008	Segesta		
2008	Draga		
2008	Suhopolje		
2009–2010	Orijent		
2010–2011	Akzhayik	30	(0)
2011	Ħamrun Spartans	15	(0)
- * Club domestic league appearances and goals

Nikica Gaćeša (born 20 July 1983) is a Croatian former professional footballer who played as a defender.
