= Roman Pakholyuk =

Ukrainian footballer

Personal information
- Full name: Roman Vasylyovych Pakholyuk
- Date of birth: 3 October 1979 (age 47)
- Place of birth: Kornyn, Zhytomyr Oblast, Soviet Union
- Position: Forward

Youth career
- RVUFK Kyiv

Senior career*
Years	Team	Apps	(Gls)
1997–2002	Arsenal (CSKA) Kyiv	20	(2)
1997–2002	→ CSKA (CSKA-2) Kyiv	137	(34)
2000–2001	→ Systema-Boreks Borodyanka	8	(2)
2003	FC Ordabasy	12	(1)
2003–2004	Chornomorets Odesa	2	(0)
2003–2004	→ Chornomorets-2 Odesa	6	(0)
2003–2004	→ MFC Mykolaiv	15	(3)
2004–2005	Nyva Vinnytsia	32	(17)
2006–2007	Dnipro Cherkasy	61	(19)
2008	FC Kaisar	26	(7)
2009–2011	Lokomotiv Astana	46	(7)
2011	FC Taraz	13	(0)
2011	FC Astana	9	(0)
2012	FC Ordabasy	22	(2)
2013	FC Atyrau	8	(1)
2013	FC Ordabasy	10	(1)
2016	Arsenal Kyiv	9	(1)

International career
2001	Ukraine U-21	1	(0)
- * Club domestic league appearances and goals

Roman Pakholyuk (Ukrainian: Роман Васильович Пахолюк; born 3 October 1979) is a Ukrainian retired football forward.

== Career ==
Pakholyuk became the highest scorer along with Oleksandr Aliyev (Dynamo-2 Kyiv) when he scored 16 goals for FC Nyva Vinnytsia during the 2004–05 Ukrainian First League season. Between 2008 and 2013 he played in the Kazakhstan Premier League for various clubs and attained Kazakhstani citizenship.

In 2001 he played one game against Yugoslavian youth team.
