= Bobi Bozhinovski =

Macedonian footballer

Personal information
- Full name: Bobi Bozhinovski
- Date of birth: 24 February 1981 (age 45)
- Place of birth: Skopje, SR Macedonia, SFR Yugoslavia
- Height: 1.83 m (6 ft 0 in)
- Position: Midfielder

Team information
- Current team: FK Makedonija
- Number: 7

Youth career
- Vardar

Senior career*
Years	Team	Apps	(Gls)
1999–2005	Vardar	73	(3)
2001	→ Belasica (loan)	5	(0)
2001	→ Makedonija (loan)	14	(1)
2005	Cementarnica	16	(5)
2006–2007	Vėtra	40	(4)
2008	Sūduva	26	(2)
2009–2010	Rabotnički	35	(17)
2010–2011	Lokomotiv Astana	30	(1)
2012–2013	Teteks	27	(3)
2013–2014	Makedonija	26	(0)
2014–2016	Teteks	57	(6)
2016–2017	Pelister	25	(1)
2017–	Makedonija	139	(35)

International career^{‡}
	Macedonia	0	(0)
- * Club domestic league appearances and goals as of 1 June 2022 ‡ National team caps and goals as of 8 March 2020

Bobi Bozhinovski (Macedonian: Боби Божиновски; born 24 February 1981) is a Macedonian footballer currently playing for FK Makedonija Gjorče Petrov as a midfielder.
