= Ulyqbek Asanbayev =

Kazakhstani footballer

Personal information
- Date of birth: 13 September 1979 (age 47)
- Place of birth: Shymkent, Kazakh SSR, Soviet Union
- Height: 1.86 m (6 ft 1 in)
- Position: Midfielder

Senior career*
Years	Team	Apps	(Gls)
1996	SKIF-Ordabasy	27	(0)
1997	MHSK Tashkent	4	(0)
1998–1999	Dustlik	15	(1)
2000–2001	Pakhtakor Tashkent	38	(5)
2001	Zhenis Astana	8	(0)
2001	Esil	16	(4)
2002	Esil Bogatyr	26	(1)
2003	Zhenis Astana	5	(0)
2003–2006	Kairat	67	(7)
2006–2009	Aktobe	78	(7)
2010–2011	Ordabasy	34	(2)
2011	Irtysh Pavlodar	13	(1)
2012	Ordabasy	0	(0)

International career^{‡}
2006–2008	Kazakhstan	6	(0)
- * Club domestic league appearances and goals as of 11 December 2015 ‡ National team caps and goals as of 14 September 2008

Ulyqbek Asanbayev (Kazakh: Ұлықбек Асанбаев, Ūlyqbek Asanbaev) is a Kazakh former footballer.

== International ==
Kazakhstan
Year	Apps	Goals
2006	1	0
2007	0	0
2008	5	0
Total	6	0

Statistics accurate as of match played 10 September 2008

== Honours ==
MHSK Tashkent

- Uzbek League (1): 1997

Dustlik

- Uzbek League (1): 1999

Pakhtakor Tashkent

- Uzbekistan Cup (1): 2001

Zhenis Astana

- Kazakhstan Premier League (1): 2001
- Kazakhstan Cup (1): 2000-01

Kairat

- Kazakhstan Premier League (1): 2004
- Kazakhstan Cup (1): 2003

Aktobe

- Kazakhstan Premier League (3): 2007, 2008, 2009
- Kazakhstan Cup (1): 2008

Ordabasy

- Kazakhstan Cup (1): 2011
