= Maksim Zhalmagambetov =

Kazakhstani footballer

Personal information
- Full name: Maksim Zhalmagambetov
- Date of birth: 11 July 1983 (age 43)
- Place of birth: Astana, Kazakh SSR, Soviet Union
- Height: 1.95 m (6 ft 5 in)
- Position: Defender

Youth career
- FC Astana

Senior career*
Years	Team	Apps	(Gls)
2001–2002	Astana	2	
2002	FC Akzhayik Astana	6	(4)
2003	Ekibastuzets	2	
2003	FC Zhastar Astana	10	(3)
2004	FC Eurasia Astana	10	(4)
2004–2007	Astana	66	(11)
2008	Royal Antwerp	1	(0)
2008	Astana	7	(1)
2009	Zhetysu	8	(1)
2010–2011	Irtysh	30	(0)
2011	Astana	11	(1)
2012	Ordabasy	4	(0)
2013	Atyrau	0	(0)
2013	Astana-1964	8	(1)
2015	Kyzylzhar	2	(0)

International career^{‡}
2004–2008	Kazakhstan	30	(0)
- * Club domestic league appearances and goals as of 18 November 2015 ‡ National team caps and goals as of 17 November 2014

Maksim Zhalmagambetov (Russian: Максим Жалмағамбетов) is a Kazakh football defender. He is currently in the starting XI of the national team.

== Early career ==
Maksim had graduated from his hometown FC Astana and had played in its different feeder clubs, before he eventually got to the first team in 2004.

== International career ==
At the age of 21, Maksim earned his first cap on 17 November 2004 in WC 2006 qualifier against Greece. Maksim would have played all Euro 2008 qualifiers, unless being sent off in a match against Azerbaijan for punching a defender in face, and therefore getting 3 games ban.

== Royal Antwerp switch ==
On 31 January 2008, along with Sergei Ostapenko, Maksim signed a two-year contract with Royal Antwerp F.C. The Belgium team's manager noted that the duo's youth, international experience and physical characteristics were strong arguments to accomplish the deal. However, his European journey was not quite successful and he only started in one game for the reds. Both he and Sergei Ostapenko shortly returned to Astana in the middle of the Kazakhstan Premier League 2008.

== Club career stats ==
Last update: 10 December 2010

Season	Team	Country	League	Level	Apps	Goals
2001	Astana	Kazakhstan	Premier League	1	0	0
2002	Astana	Kazakhstan	Premier League	1	2	0
2002	Akzhayik Astana	Kazakhstan	Second Division	3	6	4
2002	Astana	Kazakhstan	Premier League	1	2	0
2003	Ekibastuzets	Kazakhstan	Premier League	1	2	0
2003	Zhastar Astana	Kazakhstan	First Division	2	10	3
2004	Eurasia Astana	Kazakhstan	First Division	2	10	4
2004	Astana	Kazakhstan	Premier League	1	10	0
2005	Astana	Kazakhstan	Premier League	1	1	0
2006	Astana	Kazakhstan	Premier League	1	28	8
2007	Astana	Kazakhstan	Premier League	1	27	3
2007–08	Royal Antwerp	Belgium	Second Division	2	1	0
2008	Astana	Kazakhstan	Premier League	1	7	1
2009	Zhetysu	Kazakhstan	Premier League	1	8	1
2010	Irtysh Pavlodar	Kazakhstan	Premier League	1	24	0
2011	Irtysh Pavlodar	Kazakhstan	Premier League	1	24	0
2011	Astana	Kazakhstan	Premier League	1	11	1
2012	Ordabasy	Kazakhstan	Premier League	1	4	0
2013	Atyrau	Kazakhstan	Premier League	1	0	0
2013	Astana-1964	Kazakhstan	First Division	2	8	1

== Honours ==
- Kazakhstan Champion: 2006
- Kazakhstan Cup Winner: 2005
