= Igor Bugaiov =

Moldovan footballer (born 1984)

Personal information
- Date of birth: 26 June 1984 (age 42)
- Place of birth: Bender, Moldavian SSR, Soviet Union
- Height: 1.85 m (6 ft 1 in)
- Position: Striker

Senior career*
Years	Team	Apps	(Gls)
2002–2004	Dinamo Bender	19	(7)
2004–2005	Tiligul-Tiras Tiraspol	22	(4)
2005–2007	Chornomorets Odesa	25	(3)
2008	Ceahlăul Piatra Neamț	9	(0)
2008–2009	Ural	6	(1)
2009	Academia Chișinău	7	(6)
2009	Metalurh Zaporizhya	4	(0)
2010–2011	Astana	57	(18)
2012–2015	Tobol	94	(22)
2016	Dacia Chișinău	0	(0)
2016–2017	Zaria Bălți	28	(8)
2017	Irtysh Pavlodar	16	(1)
2018	Milsami Orhei	15	(4)
2019	Dinamo-Auto	21	(4)
2020	Florești	19	(1)
2021	Tighina	?	(?)
Total		342	(85)

International career^{‡}
–2006	Moldova U21	11	(2)
2007–2017	Moldova	55	(9)
- * Club domestic league appearances and goals as of 21 March 2021 ‡ National team caps and goals as of 18 September 2020

Igor Bugaiov (also romanized as Bugaev; born 26 June 1984) is a retired Moldovan professional footballer.

== Career ==
Bugaiov began playing with his home-town team FC Dinamo Bender in the Moldovan National Division. In 2004, he moved to another Moldovan team, CS Tiligul-Tiras Tiraspol. The following season, he moved to Ukraine to play for FC Chornomorets Odesa. After two years there he was released, and was drafted into the Ceahlăul Piatra Neamț squad for the remainder of the 2007–08 season. He played a handful of games but was unable to help the team avoid relegation. On 31 July 2008, he was announced as an addition to the FC Ural team, who were in the midst of their season in the Russian First Division. In March 2009, he made a return to Moldova, signing with FC Academia UTM Chișinău, and scoring a hat-trick on his debut.

On 22 June 2009, he signed a 3-year deal with Ukrainian side FC Metalurh Zaporizhya.

== International career ==
Bugaiov was a member of the Moldova national team from 2007 to 2017.

=== International goals ===
Scores and results list Moldova's goal tally first.

No	Date	Venue	Opponent	Score	Result	Competition
1.	26 February 2006	Ta' Qali National Stadium, Mdina, Malta	Malta	2–0	2–0	Friendly
2.	12 September 2007	City Stadium Koševo, Sarajevo, Bosnia and Herzegovina	Bosnia and Herzegovina	1–0	1–0	UEFA Euro 2008 qualification
3.	17 October 2007	Ta' Qali National Stadium, Mdina, Malta	Malta	1–0	3–2	UEFA Euro 2008 qualification
4.	17 November 2007	Zimbru Stadium, Chișinău, Moldova	Hungary	1–0	3–0	UEFA Euro 2008 qualification
5.	6 February 2008	Titanic Stadium, Antalya, Turkey	Kazakhstan	1–0	1–0	Friendly
6.	19 November 2008	A. Le Coq Arena, Tallinn, Estonia	Lithuania	1–0	1–1	Friendly
7.	9 February 2011	Estádio Municipal Fernando Cabrita, Lagos, Portugal	Andorra	1–0	2–1	Friendly
8.	3 June 2011	Zimbru Stadium, Chișinău, Moldova	Sweden	1–3	1–4	UEFA Euro 2012 qualification
9.	9 October 2016	Zimbru Stadium, Chișinău, Moldova	Republic of Ireland	1–1	1–3	2018 FIFA World Cup qualification

== Honours ==
Astana

- Kazakhstan Cup: 2010
- Kazakhstan Super Cup: 2011

Milsami Orhei

- Moldovan Cup: 2017–18
