= Maksim Azovsky =

Kazakhstani footballer

Personal information
- Full name: Maksim Ivanovich Azovsky
- Date of birth: 4 June 1986 (age 40)
- Place of birth: Astana, Kazakh SSR
- Height: 1.87 m (6 ft 2 in)
- Position: Attacking midfielder

Team information
- Current team: Zhetysu
- Number: 18

Youth career
- –2002: Zhenis Astana

Senior career*
Years	Team	Apps	(Gls)
2003	Ekibastuzets	9	(0)
2003	Batyr Ekibastuz	9	(1)
2004	Okzhetpes	12	(0)
2004	Taraz	7	(0)
2005	Alma-Ata	16	(5)
2006–2007	Astana	37	(3)
2007–2008	Alma-Ata	38	(7)
2009	Ordabasy	4	(0)
2009	Zhetysu	11	(1)
2010–2011	Lokomotiv Astana	52	(0)
2012	Akzhayik	18	(1)
2013	Zhetysu	8	(0)
2014	Spartak Semey	22	(4)
2015–	Zhetysu	47	(1)

International career^{‡}
2005–2011	Kazakhstan	16	(0)
- * Club domestic league appearances and goals as of 31 October 2016 ‡ National team caps and goals as of 12 December 2014

Maksim Ivanovich Azovsky (Russian: Максим Иванович Азовский; born 4 June 1986) is a Kazakhstani footballer, who currently plays for FC Zhetysu.

== Career ==
=== Club ===
Azovsky played for the club FC Astana until summer 2007 when he was transferred to FC Alma-Ata and played than for FC Ordabasy.

On 18 February 2015, Azovsky signed for FC Zhetysu.

=== International ===
Azovsky has made 16 appearances for the Kazakhstan national football team.

== Personal life ==
His brother, Yegor, is also a professional footballer, currently for FC Aktobe.
