= Vyacheslav Erbes =

Kazakh footballer

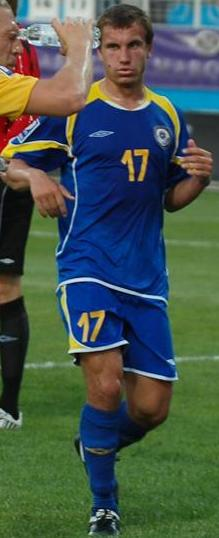
- Erbes in 2009

Personal information
- Full name: Vyacheslav Ivanovich Erbes
- Date of birth: 14 January 1988 (age 38)
- Place of birth: Oskemen, Kazakh SSR, Soviet Union
- Height: 1.73 m (5 ft 8 in)
- Position: Midfielder

Senior career*
Years	Team	Apps	(Gls)
2006–2009	Vostok	62	(7)
2010	Lokomotiv Astana	2	(0)
2011	Shakhter Karagandy	2	(0)
2011	Vostok	15	(0)
2012	Akzhayik	9	(2)
2013–2015	Vostok	59	(10)
2016	Makhtaaral	5	(0)

International career^{‡}
2009	Kazakhstan U21	2	(1)
2009–2010	Kazakhstan	7	(0)
- * Club domestic league appearances and goals as of 23 January 2018 ‡ National team caps and goals as of 23 January 2018

Vyacheslav Ivanovich Erbes (born 14 January 1988) is a Kazakh footballer who last played for FC Makhtaaral in the Kazakhstan First Division.

== Career statistics ==
=== International ===
Kazakhstan national team
Year	Apps	Goals
2009	6	0
2010	1	0
Total	7	0

Statistics accurate as of match played 3 March 2010

== Honours ==
=== Club ===
Astana

- Kazakhstan Cup (1): 2010
