= Vlade Lazarevski =

Macedonian footballer (born 1983)

Personal information
- Date of birth: 9 June 1983 (age 43)
- Place of birth: Kruševac, SFR Yugoslavia
- Height: 1.86 m (6 ft 1 in)
- Position: Defender

Senior career*
| Years | Team | Apps | (Gls) |
| 2000–2001 | Kumanovo | | |
| 2001–2005 | Napredak Kruševac | 67 | (3) |
| 2003–2004 | → 14. Oktobar Kruševac (loan) | 17 | (1) |
| 2005–2008 | Dyskobolia Grodzisk | 60 | (1) |
| 2008 | → Metalist Kharkiv (loan) | 15 | (0) |
| 2008–2009 | Polonia Warsaw | 25 | (0) |
| 2009 | Karpaty Lviv | 12 | (0) |
| 2010 | Rijeka | 10 | (0) |
| 2010 | Lokomotiv Astana | 8 | (0) |
| 2011–2012 | Amiens | 15 | (0) |
| 2012 | Smederevo | 13 | (0) |
| 2013 | Flamurtari | 10 | (0) |
| 2014 | Zvijezda Gradačac | 16 | (0) |
| 2014 | Radnički Niš | 10 | (0) |
| 2015–2018 | Temnić | 58 | (4) |

International career
| 2004 | Macedonia U21 | 10 | (0) |
| 2005–2011 | Macedonia | 43 | (0) |
- * Club domestic league appearances and goals

Vlade Lazarevski (Macedonian: Владе Лазаревски; born 9 June 1983) is a former professional footballer who played as a defender. He represented the Macedonia national football team internationally.

== Club career ==
On 19 December 2007, Lazarevski was thought to be in England on a trial-basis training with Premier League team Derby County; it was unsuccessful and he returned to Poland.

In late February, Lazarevski emerged in Ukraine, training with a team of Ukrainian Premier League FC Metalist Kharkiv. Soon after transfer occurred and Vlade was announced to the public as club's newest signing. He played for Karpaty Lviv in 2009 before joining Rijeka on 27 January 2010. Lazarevski signed with Lokomotiv Astana on 8 July 2010. In December 2010 Lazarevski confirmed his move to FC Tobol. The club was not paying his salary so he reported them to FIFA and he became a free agent. The next summer, on his 28th Birthday he signed with Amiens who had just been promoted to the French Ligue 2. In February 2014 he signed with NK Zvijezda Gradačac.

In the season 2016–17 he helped FK Temnić Lipa win the Serbian League East and achieve promotion to Serbian second level, the Serbian First League.

== International career ==
While playing in Serbia with Napredak, still as a talented youngster, he became almost simultaneously a member of the Macedonia U-21 team. He made his debut for the Macedonian senior team in a June 2005 FIFA World Cup qualification match against the Czech Republic and has earned a total of 43 caps, scoring no goals. His final international was an October 2011 European Championship qualification match against Slovakia.

== Honours ==
Dyskobolia Grodzisk

- Polish Cup: 2006–07
- Ekstraklasa Cup: 2006–07, 2007–08

Lokomotiv Astana

- Kazakhstan Cup: 2010
