= Aleksei Belkin =

Russian footballer

Personal information
- Full name: Aleksei Vladimirovich Belkin
- Date of birth: 25 November 1981 (age 44)
- Height: 1.94 m (6 ft 4 in)
- Position: Goalkeeper

Youth career
- FShM-Torpedo Moscow

Senior career*
Years	Team	Apps	(Gls)
1998–2000	FC Torpedo-2 Moscow	19	(0)
2000–2001	FC Dynamo Vologda	40	(0)
2002	FC Rybinsk	6	(0)
2003–2004	FC Tom Tomsk	14	(0)
2005	FC Oryol	7	(0)
2006	FC Chernomorets Novorossiysk	9	(0)
2007	FC Lukhovitsy	25	(0)
2008	FC Dynamo Vologda	31	(0)
2009	FC Volga Tver	6	(0)
2010–2012	FC Lokomotiv Astana	14	(0)
- * Club domestic league appearances and goals

Aleksei Vladimirovich Belkin (Russian: Алексей Владимирович Белкин; born 25 November 1981) is a former Russian professional football player.

== Club career ==
He played two seasons in the Russian Football National League for FC Tom Tomsk and FC Oryol.
