= Maksim Samchenko =

Kazakhstani footballer

Personal information
- Date of birth: 5 May 1979 (age 47)
- Place of birth: Kazakhstan
- Height: 1.86 m (6 ft 1 in)
- Position: Defender

Youth career
- FC Bolat

Senior career*
| Years | Team | Apps | (Gls) |
| 1995–1997 | Bolat | 37 | (0) |
| 1998–2000 | Vostok | 58 | (3) |
| 2001–2003 | Shakhter Karagandy | 55 | (0) |
| 2003–2006 | Aktobe | 103 | (2) |
| 2007–2008 | Shakhter Karagandy | 36 | (0) |
| 2009–2010 | Lokomotiv Astana | 44 | (0) |
| 2011 | Zhetysu | 29 | (0) |
| 2012–2013 | Atyrau | 37 | (0) |
| 2014 | Spartak Semey | 7 | (0) |

International career^{‡}
| 2000–2004 | Kazakhstan | 6 | (0) |
- * Club domestic league appearances and goals as of 6 November 2013 ‡ National team caps and goals as of 24 January 2010

Maksim Samchenko (born 5 May 1979) is a Kazakh football defender whose last known club was Spartak Semey. Samchenko has six caps with the Kazakhstan national football team.

He formerly played for FC Bolat, FC Vostok, FC Shakhter and FC Aktobe.
