= Denis Prokopenko =

Kazakhstani footballer

Personal information
- Date of birth: 5 October 1991 (age 35)
- Place of birth: Kazakhstan
- Height: 1.76 m (5 ft 9 1/2 in)
- Position: Forward

Team information
- Current team: Niki Volos

Youth career
- –2008: Astana-1964

Senior career*
Years	Team	Apps	(Gls)
2010–2012	Astana	4	(0)
2013–2014	Bayterek	32	(9)
2014	Astana-1964	8	(5)
2014–	Niki Volos	0	(0)

International career^{‡}
2007	Kazakhstan U-17	3	(1)
2010–2012	Kazakhstan U-21	7	(0)
- * Club domestic league appearances and goals as of 1 June 2014 ‡ National team caps and goals as of 1 June 2014

Denis Prokopenko (Kazakh: Денис Прокопенко; born 5 October 1991) is a Kazakh football forward, who plays for Niki Volos.

== Career ==
=== Club career statistics ===
As of 1 June 2014

Club	Season	League		Cup		Europe		Total	
Club	Season	Apps	Goals	Apps	Goals	Apps	Goals	Apps	Goals
Astana	2010	0	0	0	0	-	-	0	0
Astana	2011	3	0	0	0	-	-	3	0
Astana	2012	1	0	3	1	-	-	4	1
Bayterek	2013	32	9	1	0	-	-	33	9
Astana-1964	2014	8	5	2	0	-	-	10	5
Niki Volos	2014-2015	0	0	0	0	-	-	0	0
Career Total		44	14	6	1	0	0	50	15
