= 2013 FC Astana season =

FC Astana
2013 season
- Chairman: Kaisar Bekenov
- Manager: Miroslav Beránek until 13 July 2013; Grigori Babayan (interim); 13–23 July 2013; Ioan Andone from 23 July 2013
- Stadium: Astana Arena
- Premier League: 2nd
- Kazakhstan Cup: Quarter-final vs Shakhter Karagandy
- Kazakhstan Super Cup: Runners Up
- Europa League: First Qualifying Round vs Botev Plovdiv
- Top goalscorer: League: Three Players (6); All: Three Players (7)
- Highest home attendance: 9,000 vs Aktobe (27 October 2013)
- Lowest home attendance: 1,500 vs Vostok (1 May 2013)
- Average home league attendance: 3,572 (27 October 2013)
| Home colours | Away colours | Third colours |

The 2013 FC Astana season was the fifth successive season that Astana played in the Kazakhstan Premier League, the highest tier of association football in Kazakhstan. They also participate in the Kazakhstan Cup, reaching the quarter-finals, and the Europa League, where they were knocked out in the first qualifying round.

== Squad ==
As of match played 2 November 2013

| No. | Name | Nationality | Position | Date of birth (age) | Signed from | Signed in | Apps. | Goals |
Goalkeepers
| 1 | Nenad Erić | (Serbia) | GK | 26 May 1982 (aged 31) | Kairat | 2011 | 98 | 0 |
| 18 | Vladimir Loginovsky | (Kazakhstan) | GK | 8 October 1985 (aged 28) | Zhetysu | 2013 | 1 | 0 |
| 24 | Denis Tolebaev | (Kazakhstan) | GK | 7 February 1987 (aged 26) | Vostok | 2012 | 0 | 0 |
| 77 | Aleksandr Konochkin | (Kazakhstan) | GK | 20 January 1994 (aged 19) | Academy | 2011 | 0 | 0 |
| 78 | Rimas Martinkus | (Kazakhstan) | GK | 13 January 1993 (aged 20) | Academy | 2011 | 0 | 0 |
| 95 | Aleksandr Sidorov | (Kazakhstan) | GK | 13 March 1995 (aged 18) | Academy | 2011 | 0 | 0 |
Defenders
| 2 | Yeldos Akhmetov | (Kazakhstan) | DF | 1 June 1990 (aged 23) | Taraz | 2013 | 9 | 1 |
| 4 | Igor Pikalkin | (Kazakhstan) | DF | 19 March 1992 (aged 21) | Shakhter Karagandy | 2013 | 2 | 0 |
| 5 | Kirill Pasichnik | (Kazakhstan) | DF | 24 May 1993 (aged 20) | Dnipro Dnipropetrovsk | 2013 | 8 | 0 |
| 6 | Kairat Nurdauletov | (Kazakhstan) | DF | 6 November 1982 (aged 30) | Tobol | 2010 | 107 | 8 |
| 8 | Viktor Dmitrenko | (Kazakhstan) | DF | 4 April 1991 (aged 22) | Kuban Krasnodar | 2012 | 60 | 3 |
| 14 | Blažo Igumanović | (Montenegro) | DF | 16 January 1986 (aged 27) | Rudar Pljevlja | 2013 | 11 | 0 |
| 16 | Yevgeni Goryachi | (Kazakhstan) | DF | 4 April 1991 (aged 22) | Kairat | 2012 | 12 | 0 |
| 21 | Aleksandr Kirov | (Kazakhstan) | DF | 4 September 1984 (aged 29) | Shakhter Karagandy | 2013 | 61 | 3 |
| 26 | Zelão | (Brazil) | DF | 12 November 1984 (aged 28) | Kuban Krasnodar | 2013 | 32 | 3 |
| 34 | Adil Zhakipbaev | (Kazakhstan) | DF | 23 November 1994 (aged 18) | Academy | 2013 | 0 | 0 |
| 47 | Dmitry Kaminsky | (Kazakhstan) | DF | 10 March 1993 (aged 20) | Academy | 2013 | 0 | 0 |
| 69 | Daniil Stasyunas | (Kazakhstan) | DF | 22 July 1993 (aged 20) | Academy | 2013 | 0 | 0 |
| 94 | Birzhan Kulbekov | (Kazakhstan) | DF | 22 April 1994 (aged 19) | Academy | 2013 | 0 | 0 |
Midfielders
| 3 | Valeri Korobkin | (Kazakhstan) | MF | 2 July 1984 (aged 29) | Yenisey Krasnoyarsk | 2012 | 50 | 3 |
| 7 | Ulan Konysbayev | (Kazakhstan) | MF | 28 May 1989 (aged 24) | Taraz | 2011 | 78 | 9 |
| 10 | Foxi Kéthévoama | (Central African Republic) | MF | 30 May 1986 (aged 27) | Kecskeméti | 2013 | 63 | 10 |
| 11 | Bauyrzhan Islamkhan | (Kazakhstan) | MF | 23 February 1993 (aged 20) | loan from Kuban Krasnodar | 2013 | 8 | 1 |
| 15 | Abzal Beisebekov | (Kazakhstan) | MF | 30 November 1992 (aged 20) | Vostok | 2012 | 64 | 1 |
| 20 | Damir Kojašević | (Montenegro) | MF | 3 June 1987 (aged 26) | Budućnost Podgorica | 2013 | 50 | 11 |
| 22 | Marat Shakhmetov | (Kazakhstan) | MF | 6 February 1989 (aged 24) | Alma-Ata | 2009 | 137 | 6 |
| 23 | Islambek Kuat | (Kazakhstan) | MF | 12 January 1993 (aged 20) | Academy | 2010 | 22 | 2 |
| 25 | Nurdaulet Cosman | (Kazakhstan) | MF | 3 April 1992 (aged 21) | Academy | 2013 | 0 | 0 |
| 30 | Temirlan Begimbay | (Kazakhstan) | MF | 9 September 1995 (aged 18) | Academy | 2013 | 0 | 0 |
| 31 | Azat Smagulov | (Kazakhstan) | MF | 31 July 1992 (aged 21) | Academy | 2010 | 0 | 0 |
| 34 | Zhumazhan Musabekov | (Kazakhstan) | MF | 4 December 1992 (aged 20) | Academy | 2010 | 0 | 0 |
| 36 | Vladislav Mendybaev | (Kazakhstan) | MF | 1 May 1996 (aged 17) | Academy | 2013 | 0 | 0 |
| 37 | Islam Akhmetov | (Kazakhstan) | MF | 3 July 1995 (aged 18) | Academy | 2013 | 0 | 0 |
| 38 | Madi Zamataev | (Kazakhstan) | MF | 28 March 1995 (aged 18) | Academy | 2013 | 0 | 0 |
| 40 | Islambek Kulekenov | (Kazakhstan) | MF | 15 September 1994 (aged 19) | Academy | 2013 | 0 | 0 |
| 44 | Abylkayyr Ismailov | (Kazakhstan) | MF | 26 March 1995 (aged 18) | Academy | 2013 | 0 | 0 |
| 49 | Kirill Sazonov | (Kazakhstan) | MF | 25 February 1993 (aged 20) | Academy | 2012 | 0 | 0 |
| 55 | Alexander Sharifullin | (Kazakhstan) | MF | 21 March 1995 (aged 18) | Academy | 2013 | 0 | 0 |
| 70 | Nursultan Kurmangali | (Kazakhstan) | MF | 15 May 1994 (aged 19) | Academy | 2013 | 0 | 0 |
| 95 | Abai Zhunusov | (Kazakhstan) | MF | 15 March 1995 (aged 18) | Academy | 2013 | 0 | 0 |
Forwards
| 9 | Sergei Ostapenko | (Kazakhstan) | FW | 23 February 1986 (aged 27) | Zhetysu | 2012 | 88 | 18 |
| 12 | Patrick Twumasi | (Ghana) | FW | 9 May 1994 (aged 19) | loan from Spartaks Jūrmala | 2013 | 11 | 6 |
| 17 | Tanat Nusserbayev | (Kazakhstan) | FW | 1 January 1987 (aged 26) | Ordabasy | 2011 | 87 | 25 |
| 28 | Cícero | (Guinea-Bissau) | FW | 8 May 1986 (aged 27) | loan from Paços de Ferreira | 2013 | 8 | 2 |
| 32 | Timur Bakhriden | (Kazakhstan) | FW | 23 February 1994 (aged 19) | Academy | 2011 | 0 | 0 |
| 69 | Bimukhamed Bukeev | (Kazakhstan) | FW | 2 July 1993 (aged 20) | Academy | 2011 | 0 | 0 |
| 79 | Igor Popadinets | (Kazakhstan) | FW | 28 February 1994 (aged 19) | Academy | 2010 | 0 | 0 |
| 85 | Daurenbek Tazhimbetov | (Kazakhstan) | FW | 2 July 1985 (aged 28) | loan from Shakhter Karagandy | 2013 | 4 | 0 |
Players away on loan
| 88 | Rinat Khairullin | (Kazakhstan) | MF | 19 December 1994 (aged 18) | Academy | 2011 | 0 | 0 |
Players that left during the season
| 13 | Igor Țîgîrlaș | (Moldova) | MF | 24 February 1984 (aged 29) | Gomel | 2013 | 18 | 2 |
| 19 | Yerzhan Mukhamedin | (Kazakhstan) | FW | 2 September 1990 (aged 23) | Academy | 2010 | 0 | 0 |
| 28 | Filip Ivanovski | (North Macedonia) | FW | 1 May 1985 (aged 28) | Vardar | 2012 | 28 | 5 |

== Transfers ==
=== Winter ===
In: Note: Flags indicate national team as defined under FIFA eligibility rules; some limited exceptions apply. Players may hold more than one non-FIFA nationality.

| No. | Pos. | Nation | Player |
|---|---|---|---|
| 4 | DF | KAZ | Igor Pikalkin (from (Kazakhstan) Shakhter Karagandy) |
| 5 | DF | KAZ | Kirill Pasichnik |
| 10 | MF | CAF | Foxi Kéthévoama (from (Hungary) Kecskeméti, previously on loan) |
| 13 | MF | MDA | Igor Țîgîrlaș (from (Belarus) Gomel) |
| 18 | GK | KAZ | Vladimir Loginovsky (from (Kazakhstan) Zhetysu) |
| 20 | MF | MNE | Damir Kojašević (from (Montenegro) Budućnost Podgorica, previously on loan) |
| 21 | DF | KAZ | Alexander Kirov (from (Kazakhstan) Shakhter Karagandy) |
| 23 | MF | KAZ | Islambek Kuat (from (Kazakhstan) Aktobe) |
| 26 | DF | BRA | Zelão (from (Russia) Kuban Krasnodar) |
| 85 | GK | KAZ | Vladimir Loginovskiy (from (Kazakhstan) Zhetysu) |

Out: Note: Flags indicate national team as defined under FIFA eligibility rules; some limited exceptions apply. Players may hold more than one non-FIFA nationality.

| No. | Pos. | Nation | Player |
|---|---|---|---|
| 13 | FW | SRB | Danilo Belić (to (Kazakhstan) Ordabasy, previously on loan to (Kazakhstan) Zhetysu) |
| 18 | DF | KAZ | Nurtas Kurgulin (to (Kazakhstan) Tobol) |
| 19 | MF | CMR | Christian Ebala (loan return to (Hungary) Kecskeméti) |
| 23 | MF | KAZ | Serik Zaynalov |
| 27 | DF | KAZ | Mikhail Rozhkov |
| 29 | DF | MKD | Dimitrija Lazarevski (to (North Macedonia) Vardar) |
| 30 | DF | KAZ | Radmir Moksinov |
| 33 | MF | KAZ | Eduard Tromenshleger |
| 35 | DF | KAZ | Zhanat Zakirov |
| 37 | FW | KAZ | Jaba Jamarishvili |
| 40 | FW | KAZ | Denis Prokopenko (to (Kazakhstan) Bayterek) |
| 44 | DF | KAZ | Pavel Khalezov |
| 45 | MF | KAZ | Maksim Shaubert |
| 50 | DF | KAZ | Darkhan Kosherbaev |
| 52 | MF | KAZ | Ilya Beruashvili |
| 55 | GK | RUS | Aleksei Belkin |
| 58 | DF | KAZ | Erbol Musabaev |
| 91 | MF | KAZ | Arsen Inkarbekov |
| 93 | GK | KAZ | Denis Ovsyannikov |
| 99 | MF | KAZ | Baikonyr Idrisov |

=== Summer ===
In: Note: Flags indicate national team as defined under FIFA eligibility rules; some limited exceptions apply. Players may hold more than one non-FIFA nationality.

| No. | Pos. | Nation | Player |
|---|---|---|---|
| 2 | DF | KAZ | Yeldos Akhmetov (from (Kazakhstan) Taraz) |
| 11 | MF | KAZ | Baurzhan Islamkhan (loan from (Russia) Kuban Krasnodar) |
| 12 | FW | GHA | Patrick Twumasi (loan from (Latvia) Spartaks Jūrmala) |
| 14 | DF | MNE | Blažo Igumanović (from (Montenegro) Rudar Pljevlja) |
| 29 | FW | GBS | Cícero (loan from (Portugal) Paços de Ferreira) |
| 85 | FW | KAZ | Daurenbek Tazhimbetov (loan from (Kazakhstan) Shakhter Karagandy) |

Out: Note: Flags indicate national team as defined under FIFA eligibility rules; some limited exceptions apply. Players may hold more than one non-FIFA nationality.

| No. | Pos. | Nation | Player |
|---|---|---|---|
| 13 | MF | MDA | Igor Țîgîrlaș |
| 19 | FW | KAZ | Yerzhan Mukhamedin |
| 28 | FW | MKD | Filip Ivanovski |
| 88 | MF | KAZ | Rinat Khairullin (loan to (Kazakhstan) Astana-1964) |

== Competitions ==
=== Kazakhstan Super Cup ===
| 3 March 2013 | Shakhter Karagandy | 3 – 2 (a.e.t.) | Astana | Astana |
| 17:00 (UTC+6) | Cañas (yellow card) 65'; Baizhanov 58' (yellow card) 110'; Paryvayew 58'; Malyi (yellow card) 104'; Kukeyev 118' (yellow card) 118' | Report | Kéthévoama 63'; Ostapenko 90'; Nusserbayev (yellow card) 120+1' | Stadium: Astana Arena; Attendance: 11,200; Referee: Igor Khisamutdinov |

=== Premier League ===
==== Regular season ====
===== Results summary =====
| Overall | | | | | | | | Home | | | | | | Away | | | | | |
| Pld | W | D | L | GF | GA | GD | Pts | W | D | L | GF | GA | GD | W | D | L | GF | GA | GD |
|---|---|---|---|---|---|---|---|---|---|---|---|---|---|---|---|---|---|---|---|
| 22 | 12 | 5 | 5 | 35 | 24 | +11 | 41 | 6 | 2 | 3 | 17 | 10 | +7 | 6 | 3 | 2 | 18 | 14 | +4 |

Last updated: 7 July 2014.
Source: Soccerway

===== Results by round =====
| Round | 1 | 2 | 3 | 4 | 5 | 6 | 7 | 8 | 9 | 10 | 11 | 12 | 13 | 14 | 15 | 16 | 17 | 18 | 19 | 20 | 21 | 22 |
|---|---|---|---|---|---|---|---|---|---|---|---|---|---|---|---|---|---|---|---|---|---|---|
| Ground | A | H | A | H | A | H | A | H | A | A | H | A | H | A | H | A | H | A | H | H | A | H |
| Result | L | D | W | W | W | L | W | W | D | W | W | W | L | W | W | L | D | D | W | L | D | W |
| Position | | | | | | | | | | | | | | | | | | | | | | |

Source: Soccerway
A = Away; H = Home; W = Win; D = Draw; L = Loss

===== Results =====
| 9 March 2013 1 | Tobol | 5 – 1 | Astana | Kostanay |
| 15:00 (UTC+6) | Krasić 17'; Šljivić 24'; Dmitrenko 26' (o.g.); Dzholchiyev 61'; Saleh 67' | Report | Dmitrenko (yellow card) 31'; Zelão 52' | Stadium: Central Stadium; Attendance: 3,000; Referee: Bolat Karlibayev |

| 15 March 2013 2 | Astana | 0 – 0 | Kairat | Astana |
| 17:00 (UTC+6) | Korobkin (yellow card) 34' | Report | Knežević (yellow card) 52' | Stadium: Astana Arena; Attendance: 2,000; Referee: Akmalkhan Kholmatov |

| 30 March 2013 3 | Ordabasy | 0 – 2 | Astana | Shymkent |
| 15:00 (UTC+6) | Karpovich (yellow card) 10'; Mukhtarov (yellow card) 23'; Aliev (yellow card) 66' | Report | Nusserbayev 2'; Beisebekov (yellow card) 40'; Țîgîrlaș 89' | Stadium: Kazhimukan Munaitpasov Stadium; Attendance: 3,000; Referee: Sergey Gorokhovodatskiy |

| 6 April 2013 4 | Astana | 1 – 0 | Vostok | Astana |
| 17:00 (UTC+6) | Kojašević (yellow card) 30'; Nurdauletov (yellow card) 61'; Shakhmetov 81' | Report | K.Tarkhov (yellow card) 80'; Abu Bakr (yellow card) 90+4' | Stadium: Astana Arena; Attendance: 2,000; Referee: Artyom Kuchin |

| 14 April 2013 5 | Shakhter Karagandy | 1 – 3 | Astana | Temirtau |
| 16:00 (UTC+6) | Baizhanov (yellow card) 12'; Khizhnichenko 45+2'; Paryvayew (yellow card) 45+2'; Simčević (yellow card) 84' | Report | Nurdauletov 7'; Erić (yellow card) 28'; Ostapenko 44'; Shakhmetov (yellow card) 58'; Korobkin 66' (yellow card) 75'; Dmitrenko (yellow card) 87' | Stadium: Metallurg Stadium; Attendance: 3,000; Referee: Igor Aleshin |

| 20 April 2013 6 | Astana | 1 – 2 | Aktobe | Astana |
| 17:00 (UTC+6) | Beisebekov (yellow card) 47'; Ostapenko 60' (yellow card) 80'; Shakhmetov (yellow card) 67' | Report | Arzumanyan (yellow card) 16'; Kharabara 35' (yellow card) 73'; P.Badlo (yellow card) 37'; Miroshnichenko 77' | Stadium: Astana Arena; Attendance: 6,500; Referee: Viktor Antonov |

| 24 April 2013 7 | Irtysh Pavlodar | 0 – 1 | Astana | Pavlodar |
| 17:00 (UTC+6) | Chuchman (yellow card) 25'; Kulchy (yellow card) 63'; Kučera (yellow card) 65'; Ivanov (yellow card) 90+1' | Report | Konysbayev 20'; Korobkin (yellow card) 62' | Stadium: Central Stadium; Attendance: 4,800; Referee: Anatolyi Vishnichenko |

| 28 April 2013 8 | Astana | 4 – 1 | Zhetysu | Astana |
| 17:00 (UTC+6) | Korobkin 20' (yellow card) 60'; Kojašević 48'; Ostapenko 66'; Țîgîrlaș 78' | Report | Ergashev (yellow card) 32'; Z.Korobov (yellow card) 58'; Junuzović 68'; S.Sariyev (yellow card) 87' | Stadium: Astana Arena; Attendance: 3,000; Referee: Aleksandr Gauzer |

| 5 May 2013 9 | Akzhayik | 2 – 2 | Astana | Oral |
| 19:00 (UTC+6) | R.Khairov (yellow card) 25'; Černý 35'; Zyankovich 55'; Y.Kostrub (yellow card) 64' | Report | Konysbayev 49'; Shakhmetov (yellow card) 83'; Kojašević 85' | Stadium: Petr Atoyan Stadium; Attendance: 6,000; Referee: Akmalkhan Kholmatov |

| 11 May 2013 10 | Atyrau | 1 – 2 | Astana | Atyrau |
| 18:00 (UTC+6) | Plotnikov (red card) 20'; Pakholyuk (yellow card) 45+1'; A.Nuribekov (yellow card) 55' (goal) 64'; Milanković (yellow card) 72' | Report | Dmitrenko (yellow card) 35'; Korobkin 45'; Nurdauletov 50' (pen.); Kojašević (yellow card) 58'; Kéthévoama (yellow card) 85'; Țîgîrlaș (yellow card) 90+3' | Stadium: Munaishy Stadium; Attendance: 3,000; Referee: Igor Aleshin |

| 18 May 2013 11 | Astana | 3 – 1 | Taraz | Astana |
| 17:00 (UTC+6) | Kéthévoama 23', 43'; Konysbayev 33' (yellow card) 34' | Report | Diakate (yellow card) 34'; S.Bauyrzhan (yellow card) 34' (goal) 72'; M.Amirkhanov (red card) 38' | Stadium: Astana Arena; Attendance: 2,500; Referee: Igor Khisamutdinov |

| 22 May 2013 12 | Kairat | 1 – 2 | Astana | Almaty |
| 17:00 (UTC+6) | Knežević 36'; S.Keiler (yellow card) 90+2' | Report | Nusserbayev 12'; Ostapenko (yellow card) 77'; Kojašević 78'; Nurdauletov (yellow card) 85' | Stadium: Central Stadium; Attendance: 6,500; Referee: Artyom Kuchin |

| 26 May 2013 13 | Astana | 0 – 1 | Ordabasy | Astana |
| 16:00 (UTC+6) | Nusserbayev (yellow card) 76'; Shakhmetov (yellow card) 76' | Report | T.Adyrbekov (yellow card) 8'; Gueye 43'; Irismetov (yellow card) 62'; Mukhtarov (red card) 82' | Stadium: Astana Arena; Attendance: 3,000; Referee: Askhat Abdanbayev |

| 30 May 2013 14 | Vostok | 1 – 3 | Astana | Oskemen |
| 17:30 (UTC+6) | Dosmagambetov 33' | Report | Ivanovski 16'; Dmitrenko (yellow card) 45'; Nurdauletov 45+1'; Zelão 73'; Kuat (yellow card) 90+1' | Stadium: Vostok Stadium; Attendance: 1,600; Referee: Viktor Antonov |

| 14 June 2013 15 | Astana | 1 – 0 | Shakhter Karagandy | Astana |
| 18:00 (UTC+6) | Shakhmetov (yellow card) 21'; Kojašević (yellow card) 56'; Țîgîrlaș (yellow card) 59'; Ivanovski 83' | Report | Simčević (yellow card) 49' | Stadium: Astana Arena; Attendance: 4,000; Referee: Anatolyi Vishnichenko |

| 23 June 2013 16 | Aktobe | 2 – 1 | Astana | Aktobe |
| 20:00 (UTC+6) | Kapadze 15', 17'; Khairullin (yellow card) 58'; Sidelnikov (yellow card) 88' | Report | Zelão (yellow card) 14'; Kuat 54'; Nusserbayev (yellow card) 70' | Stadium: Central Stadium; Attendance: 12,000; Referee: Ruslan Duzmambetov |

| 29 June 2013 17 | Astana | 1 – 1 | Irtysh Pavlodar | Astana |
| 17:00 (UTC+6) | Nusserbayev (yellow card) 34'; Kéthévoama 62'; Kojašević (yellow card) 64'; Korobkin (yellow card) 84' | Report | Shabalin (yellow card) 19'; Yurin 30' (yellow card) 34'; B.Kozhabayev (yellow card) 86' | Stadium: Astana Arena; Attendance: 2,000; Referee: Akmalkhan Kholmatov |

| 7 July 2013 18 | Zhetysu | 1 – 1 | Astana | Taldykorgan |
| 19:00 (UTC+6) | Ergashev (yellow card) 9'; Klimavičius 32'; Đalović (yellow card) 42' | Report | Kuat 27' (yellow card) 84' | Stadium: Zhetysu Stadium; Attendance: 2,500; Referee: Igor Aleshin |

| 14 July 2013 19 | Astana | 3 – 1 | Akzhayik | Astana |
| 17:00 (UTC+6) | Nusserbayev 22'; Shakhmetov (yellow card) 28'; Korobkin (yellow card) 37'; Kojašević 60'; Zelão (yellow card) 75'; Islamkhan 77' | Report | V.Pokatilov (yellow card) 18'; A.Maltsev 36' (pen.); R.Bagautdinov (yellow card) 45+1' | Stadium: Astana Arena; Attendance: 2,000; Referee: Sergey Gorokhovodatskiy |

| 21 July 2013 20 | Astana | 1 – 2 | Atyrau | Astana |
| 17:00 (UTC+6) | Zelão 28' (yellow card) 90'; Nurdauletov (red card) 45' | Report | Fomin (yellow card) 25'; Abdulin (yellow card) 33' (goal) 39'; Alviž (yellow card) 45'; Shchotkin 80' | Stadium: Astana Arena; Attendance: 3,500; Referee: Denis Izmailov |

| 28 July 2013 21 | Taraz | 0 – 0 | Astana | Taraz |
| 18:00 (UTC+6) | K.Zarechniy (yellow card) 17'; Nesterenko (yellow card) 58'; Diakate (red card) 90+5' | Report | Igumanović (yellow card) 49'; Beisebekov (yellow card) 84'; Korobkin (red card) 90+5' | Stadium: Central Stadium; Attendance: 2,300; Referee: Artyom Kuchin |

| 4 August 2013 22 | Astana | 2 – 1 | Tobol | Astana |
| 17:00 (UTC+6) | Nusserbayev 64'; Nurdauletov 85' | Report | Bugaiov 80'; E.Kuantayev (yellow card) 84' | Stadium: Astana Arena; Attendance: 2,000; Referee: Ruslan Duzmambetov |

===== League table =====
| Pos | Team | Pld | W | D | L | GF | GA | GD | Pts | Qualification |
|---|---|---|---|---|---|---|---|---|---|---|
| 1 | Aktobe | 22 | 14 | 5 | 3 | 30 | 12 | +18 | 47 | Qualification for the championship round |
| 2 | Astana | 22 | 12 | 5 | 5 | 35 | 24 | +11 | 41 | Qualification for the championship round |
| 3 | Shakhter Karagandy | 22 | 10 | 5 | 7 | 31 | 23 | +8 | 35 | Qualification for the championship round |
| 4 | Irtysh Pavlodar | 22 | 9 | 7 | 6 | 24 | 20 | +4 | 34 | Qualification for the championship round |
| 5 | Kairat | 22 | 7 | 10 | 5 | 28 | 24 | +4 | 31 | Qualification for the championship round |

Source: FFK (in Russian)
Rules for classification: 1st points;
Two team tiebreak: 1st overall wins; 2nd head-to-head record; 3rd goals difference; 4th goals scored; 5th away goals scored;
Multiple teams tiebreak: 1st overall wins; 2nd goals difference; 3rd goals scored; 4th away goals scored

==== Championship round ====
===== Results summary =====
| Overall | | | | | | | | Home | | | | | | Away | | | | | |
| Pld | W | D | L | GF | GA | GD | Pts | W | D | L | GF | GA | GD | W | D | L | GF | GA | GD |
|---|---|---|---|---|---|---|---|---|---|---|---|---|---|---|---|---|---|---|---|
| 10 | 7 | 0 | 3 | 19 | 11 | +8 | 21 | 3 | 0 | 2 | 10 | 7 | +3 | 4 | 0 | 1 | 9 | 4 | +5 |

Last updated: 8 July 2014.
Source: Soccerway

===== Results by round =====
| Round | 1 | 2 | 3 | 4 | 5 | 6 | 7 | 8 | 9 | 10 |
|---|---|---|---|---|---|---|---|---|---|---|
| Ground | H | H | A | H | A | A | H | A | H | A |
| Result | L | W | W | W | L | W | L | W | W | W |
| Position | | | | | | | | | | |

Source: Soccerway
A = Away; H = Home; W = Win; D = Draw; L = Loss

===== Results =====
| 17 August 2013 23 | Astana | 1 – 2 | Shakhter Karagandy | Astana |
| 17:00 (UTC+6) | Nusserbayev 71'; Twumasi (yellow card) 90' | Report | V.Borovskiy (yellow card) 23'; Murtazayev 50'; Finonchenko 75'; B.Abuov (yellow card) 78' | Stadium: Astana Arena; Attendance: 3,000; Referee: Anatolyi Vishnichenko |

| 24 August 2013 24 | Astana | 3 – 1 | Ordabasy | Astana |
| 17:00 (UTC+6) | Nusserbayev (yellow card) 31'; Kojašević 50' (pen.); Korobkin (yellow card) 59'; Kéthévoama 65', 72' | Report | Y.Levin (yellow card) 18'; Karpovich (yellow card) 23'; Junuzovic 27'; Mwesigwa (yellow card) 50'; T.Adyrbekov (yellow card) 68'; B.Beisenov (yellow card) 73'; Belić (yellow card) 83' | Stadium: Astana Arena; Attendance: 2,200; Referee: Akmalkhan Kholmatov |

| 30 August 2013 25 | Kairat | 1 – 2 | Astana | Almaty |
| 19:30 (UTC+6) | Ceesay 79' | Report | Kojašević 21'; Ostapenko 66' (yellow card) 74'; Igumanović (yellow card) 90+2' | Stadium: Central Stadium; Attendance: 9,000; Referee: Igor Khisamutdinov |

| 14 September 2013 26 | Astana | 4 – 2 | Irtysh Pavlodar | Astana |
| 17:00 (UTC+6) | Akhmetov 14'; Cícero (yellow card) 22' (goal) 54'; Dmitrenko 33'; Twumasi 49' | Report | Yurin (yellow card) 30' (goal) 35'; Chernyshov (yellow card) 81'; Strukov 89' | Stadium: Astana Arena; Attendance: 3,500; Referee: Artyom Kuchin |

| 21 September 2013 27 | Aktobe | 2 – 0 | Astana | Aktobe |
| 19:00 (UTC+6) | Geynrikh (yellow card) 27'; Kapadze 56'; Kharabara (yellow card) 80'; Aimbetov (yellow card) 88'; Khairullin 90+6' | Report | Kéthévoama (yellow card) 20'; Dmitrenko (yellow card) 80' | Stadium: Central Stadium; Attendance: 8,000; Referee: Ruslan Duzmambetov |

| 29 September 2013 28 | Ordabasy | 0 – 2 | Astana | Shymkent |
| 16:00 (UTC+6) | Pakholyuk (yellow card) 56'; M.Tolebek (yellow card) 71' | Report | Konysbayev 9'; Akhmetov (yellow card) 25'; Cícero (red card) 47'; Twumasi 76' | Stadium: Kazhimukan Munaitpasov Stadium; Attendance: 4,000; Referee: Anatolyi Vishnichenko |

| 5 October 2013 29 | Astana | 1 – 2 | Kairat | Astana |
| 17:00 (UTC+6) | Twumasi 45+1'; Zelão (yellow card) 90+1'; Shakhmetov (yellow card) 90+5'; Erić (yellow card) 90+5' | Report | Eremenko (yellow card) 23'; Kislitsyn (yellow card) 61'; Yedigaryan (yellow card) 61'; V.Li (yellow card) 77' (goal) 81'; Knežević 84'; Smakov (yellow card) 86'; Duff (yellow card) 86'; Kukeyev (yellow card) 90+5' | Stadium: Astana Arena; Attendance: 3,000; Referee: Artyom Kuchin |

| 19 October 2013 30 | Irtysh Pavlodar | 0 – 1 | Astana | Pavlodar |
| 16:00 (UTC+6) | Govedarica (yellow card) 17'; Shabalin (yellow card) 73' | Report | Twumasi 15'; Konysbayev (yellow card) 25' | Stadium: Central Stadium; Attendance: 3,500; Referee: Akmalkhan Kholmatov |

| 27 October 2013 31 | Astana | 1 – 0 | Aktobe | Astana |
| 15:00 (UTC+6) | Twumasi 15'; Nusserbayev (yellow card) 53'; Akhmetov (yellow card) 76'; Zelão (yellow card) 84'; Korobkin (yellow card) 88' | Report | | Stadium: Astana Arena; Attendance: 9,000; Referee: Igor Khisamutdinov |

| 2 November 2013 32 | Shakhter Karagandy | 1 – 4 | Astana | Karagandy |
| 15:00 (UTC+6) | V.Borovskiy 13'; Darabayev (yellow card) 42'; S.Lunin (yellow card) 43' | Report | Cícero 15'; Zelão (yellow card) 33'; Y.Goriachiy (yellow card) 41'; Nusserbayev 49'; Twumasi 62'; Konysbayev 66' | Stadium: Shakhter Stadium; Attendance: 1,600; Referee: Viktor Antonov |

===== League table =====
| Pos | Team | Pld | W | D | L | GF | GA | GD | Pts | Qualification |
|---|---|---|---|---|---|---|---|---|---|---|
| 1 | Aktobe (C) | 32 | 20 | 6 | 6 | 46 | 22 | +24 | 43 | Qualification for the Champions League second qualifying round |
| 2 | Astana | 32 | 19 | 5 | 8 | 54 | 35 | +19 | 42 | Qualification for the Europa League first qualifying round |
| 3 | Kairat | 32 | 12 | 12 | 8 | 44 | 38 | +6 | 33 | Qualification for the Europa League first qualifying round |
| 4 | Irtysh Pavlodar | 32 | 12 | 8 | 12 | 41 | 39 | +2 | 27 | |
| 5 | Shakhter Karagandy | 32 | 12 | 7 | 13 | 43 | 45 | −2 | 26 | Qualification for the Europa League first qualifying round (Note: Shakter qualified for the 2014–15 UEFA Europa League first qualifying round by winning the 2013 Kazakhstan Cup.) |
| 6 | Ordabasy | 32 | 11 | 8 | 13 | 33 | 34 | −1 | 23 | |

Source: Soccerway
Rules for classification: 1st points;
Two team tiebreak: 1st overall wins; 2nd head-to-head record; 3rd goals difference; 4th goals scored; 5th away goals scored;
Multiple teams tiebreak: 1st overall wins; 2nd goals difference; 3rd goals scored; 4th away goals scored.
(C) Champions

=== Kazakhstan Cup ===
| 1 May 2013 Second Round | Astana | 4 – 0 | Vostok | Astana |
| 17:00 (UTC+6) | Kéthévoama 8' (pen.); Beisebekov (yellow card) 11'; Nusserbayev 19'; Konysbayev 35'; Kojašević 49' | Report | I.Bayteryakov (yellow card) 7'; Sobolev (yellow card) 88'; Niang (yellow card) 88' | Stadium: Astana Arena; Attendance: 1,500; Referee: Askhat Abdanbayev |

| 19 June 2013 Quarter-final | Astana | 1 – 2 | Shakhter Karagandy | Astana |
| 19:00 (UTC+6) | Țîgîrlaș (yellow card) 38'; Kojašević (yellow card) 65'; Ivanovski 67'; Dmitrenko (yellow card) 87' | Report | Zyankovich (yellow card) 7' (goal) 12' (pen.); Simčević (yellow card) 52'; Cañas (yellow card) 56'; Tazhimbetov (yellow card) 80' (goal) 85' | Stadium: Astana Arena; Attendance: 7,500; Referee: Sergey Gorokhovodatskiy |

=== UEFA Europa League ===
==== Qualifying rounds ====
| 4 July 2013 First qualifying round 1st leg | Astana (Kazakhstan) | 0 – 1 | (Bulgaria) Botev Plovdiv | Astana, Kazakhstan |
| 20:00 (UTC+6) | Dmitrenko (yellow card) 75' | https://www.uefa.com/uefaeuropaleague/match/2012214--astana-vs-botev-plovdiv/ Report] | Jirsák 44'; Vander (yellow card) 62'; Galchev (yellow card) 84' | Stadium: Astana Arena; Attendance: 5,670; Referee: George Vadachkoria (Georgia) |

| 12 July 2013 First qualifying round 2nd leg | Botev Plovdiv (Bulgaria) | 5 – 0 (6 – 0 agg.) | (Kazakhstan) Astana | Burgas, Bulgaria |
| 00:30 (UTC+6) | Vander (yellow card) 30' (goal) 56' (pen.); Ognyanov 54'; Nedelev 58', 75'; Grnčarov 71' | https://www.uefa.com/uefaeuropaleague/match/2012253--botev-plovdiv-vs-astana/ Report] | Shakhmetov (yellow card) 11'; Kuat (yellow card) 29' (yellow-red card) 34' | Stadium: Lazur Stadium; Attendance: 7,400; Referee: Pavle Radovanović (Montenegro) |

== Squad statistics ==
As of match played 2 November 2013

=== Appearances and goals ===
| No. | Pos | Nat | Player | Total | | Premier League | | Kazakhstan Cup | | UEFA Europa League | | Kazakhstan Super Cup | |
| No. | Pos | Nat | Player | Apps | Goals | Apps | Goals | Apps | Goals | Apps | Goals | Apps | Goals |
|---|---|---|---|---|---|---|---|---|---|---|---|---|---|
| 1 | GK | (Serbia) SRB | Nenad Erić | 36 | 0 | 32 | 0 | 1 | 0 | 2 | 0 | 1 | 0 |
| 2 | DF | (Kazakhstan) KAZ | Yeldos Akhmetov | 9 | 1 | 9 | 1 | 0 | 0 | 0 | 0 | 0 | 0 |
| 3 | MF | (Kazakhstan) KAZ | Valeri Korobkin | 30 | 3 | 25 | 3 | 2 | 0 | 2 | 0 | 1 | 0 |
| 4 | DF | (Kazakhstan) KAZ | Igor Pikalkin | 2 | 0 | 1 | 0 | 1 | 0 | 0 | 0 | 0 | 0 |
| 5 | DF | (Kazakhstan) KAZ | Kirill Pasichnik | 8 | 0 | 1+5 | 0 | 1 | 0 | 0+1 | 0 | 0 | 0 |
| 6 | DF | (Kazakhstan) KAZ | Kairat Nurdauletov | 28 | 4 | 23+1 | 4 | 0+1 | 0 | 2 | 0 | 1 | 0 |
| 7 | MF | (Kazakhstan) KAZ | Ulan Konysbayev | 35 | 6 | 22+8 | 5 | 2 | 1 | 1+1 | 0 | 1 | 0 |
| 8 | DF | (Kazakhstan) KAZ | Viktor Dmitrenko | 36 | 1 | 31 | 1 | 2 | 0 | 2 | 0 | 1 | 0 |
| 9 | FW | (Kazakhstan) KAZ | Sergei Ostapenko | 23 | 5 | 11+11 | 4 | 0 | 0 | 0 | 0 | 1 | 1 |
| 10 | MF | (Central African Republic) CAF | Foxi Kéthévoama | 34 | 7 | 26+4 | 5 | 1 | 1 | 2 | 0 | 1 | 1 |
| 11 | MF | (Kazakhstan) KAZ | Bauyrzhan Islamkhan | 8 | 1 | 2+5 | 1 | 0 | 0 | 1 | 0 | 0 | 0 |
| 12 | FW | (Ghana) GHA | Patrick Twumasi | 11 | 6 | 6+5 | 6 | 0 | 0 | 0 | 0 | 0 | 0 |
| 14 | DF | (Montenegro) MNE | Blažo Igumanović | 11 | 0 | 7+2 | 0 | 0 | 0 | 2 | 0 | 0 | 0 |
| 15 | MF | (Kazakhstan) KAZ | Abzal Beisebekov | 33 | 0 | 29 | 0 | 1 | 0 | 2 | 0 | 1 | 0 |
| 16 | DF | (Kazakhstan) KAZ | Yevgeni Goryachi | 7 | 0 | 2+3 | 0 | 2 | 0 | 0 | 0 | 0 | 0 |
| 17 | FW | (Kazakhstan) KAZ | Tanat Nusserbayev | 29 | 7 | 20+4 | 6 | 1+1 | 1 | 1+1 | 0 | 0+1 | 0 |
| 18 | GK | (Kazakhstan) KAZ | Vladimir Loginovsky | 1 | 0 | 0 | 0 | 1 | 0 | 0 | 0 | 0 | 0 |
| 20 | FW | (Montenegro) MNE | Damir Kojašević | 34 | 7 | 16+13 | 6 | 0+2 | 1 | 1+1 | 0 | 0+1 | 0 |
| 21 | DF | (Kazakhstan) KAZ | Alexander Kirov | 16 | 0 | 15 | 0 | 0 | 0 | 0 | 0 | 1 | 0 |
| 22 | MF | (Kazakhstan) KAZ | Marat Shakhmetov | 30 | 1 | 23+4 | 1 | 2 | 0 | 1 | 0 | 0 | 0 |
| 23 | MF | (Kazakhstan) KAZ | Islambek Kuat | 22 | 2 | 6+12 | 2 | 1+1 | 0 | 1+1 | 0 | 0 | 0 |
| 26 | DF | (Brazil) BRA | Zelão | 32 | 3 | 28 | 3 | 1 | 0 | 2 | 0 | 1 | 0 |
| 28 | FW | (Guinea-Bissau) GBS | Cícero | 8 | 2 | 6+2 | 2 | 0 | 0 | 0 | 0 | 0 | 0 |
| 85 | FW | (Kazakhstan) KAZ | Daurenbek Tazhimbetov | 4 | 0 | 2+2 | 0 | 0 | 0 | 0 | 0 | 0 | 0 |
Players who appeared for Astana that left during the season:
| 13 | MF | (Moldova) MDA | Igor Țîgîrlaș | 18 | 2 | 6+9 | 2 | 2 | 0 | 0 | 0 | 0+1 | 0 |
| 28 | FW | (North Macedonia) MKD | Filip Ivanovski | 12 | 4 | 3+6 | 3 | 1+1 | 1 | 0 | 0 | 1 | 0 |

=== Goal scorers ===
| Place | Position | Nation | Number | Name | Premier League | Kazakhstan Cup | UEFA Europa League | Kazakhstan Super Cup | Total |
|---|---|---|---|---|---|---|---|---|---|
| 1 | FW | (Kazakhstan) | 17 | Tanat Nusserbayev | 6 | 1 | 0 | 0 | 7 |
| 1 | FW | (Montenegro) | 20 | Damir Kojašević | 6 | 1 | 0 | 0 | 7 |
| 1 | MF | (Central African Republic) | 10 | Foxi Kéthévoama | 5 | 1 | 0 | 1 | 7 |
| 4 | FW | (Ghana) | 12 | Patrick Twumasi | 6 | 0 | 0 | 0 | 6 |
| 4 | MF | (Kazakhstan) | 7 | Ulan Konysbayev | 5 | 1 | 0 | 0 | 6 |
| 6 | FW | (Kazakhstan) | 9 | Sergei Ostapenko | 4 | 0 | 0 | 1 | 4 |
| 7 | MF | (Kazakhstan) | 6 | Kairat Nurdauletov | 4 | 0 | 0 | 0 | 4 |
| 8 | DF | (Brazil) | 26 | Zelão | 3 | 0 | 0 | 0 | 3 |
| 8 | MF | (Kazakhstan) | 3 | Valeri Korobkin | 3 | 0 | 0 | 0 | 3 |
| 8 | FW | (North Macedonia) | 28 | Filip Ivanovski | 2 | 1 | 0 | 0 | 3 |
| 11 | FW | (Guinea-Bissau) | 28 | Cícero | 2 | 0 | 0 | 0 | 2 |
| 11 | MF | (Moldova) | 13 | Igor Țîgîrlaș | 2 | 0 | 0 | 0 | 2 |
| 11 | MF | (Kazakhstan) | 23 | Islambek Kuat | 2 | 0 | 0 | 0 | 2 |
| 14 | MF | (Kazakhstan) | 22 | Marat Shakhmetov | 1 | 0 | 0 | 0 | 1 |
| 14 | MF | (Kazakhstan) | 11 | Bauyrzhan Islamkhan | 1 | 0 | 0 | 0 | 1 |
| 14 | DF | (Kazakhstan) | 2 | Yeldos Akhmetov | 1 | 0 | 0 | 0 | 1 |
| 14 | DF | (Kazakhstan) | 8 | Viktor Dmitrenko | 1 | 0 | 0 | 0 | 1 |
| | | | | TOTALS | 54 | 5 | 0 | 2 | 61 |

=== Clean sheets ===
| Place | Position | Nation | Number | Name | Premier League | Kazakhstan Cup | UEFA Europa League | Kazakhstan Super Cup | Total |
|---|---|---|---|---|---|---|---|---|---|
| 1 | GK | (Serbia) | 1 | Nenad Erić | 9 | 1 | 0 | 0 | 10 |
| | | | | TOTALS | 9 | 1 | 0 | 0 | 10 |

=== Disciplinary record ===
| Number | Nation | Position | Name | Premier League | | Kazakhstan Cup | | UEFA Europa League | | Kazakhstan Super Cup | | Total | |
| Number | Nation | Position | Name | Yellow card | Red card | Yellow card | Red card | Yellow card | Red card | Yellow card | Red card | Yellow card | Red card |
| 1 | (Serbia) | GK | Nenad Erić | 2 | 0 | 0 | 0 | 0 | 0 | 0 | 0 | 2 | 0 |
| 2 | (Kazakhstan) | DF | Yeldos Akhmetov | 2 | 0 | 0 | 0 | 0 | 0 | 0 | 0 | 2 | 0 |
| 3 | (Kazakhstan) | MF | Valeri Korobkin | 8 | 1 | 0 | 0 | 0 | 0 | 0 | 0 | 8 | 1 |
| 6 | (Kazakhstan) | DF | Kairat Nurdauletov | 2 | 1 | 0 | 0 | 0 | 0 | 0 | 0 | 2 | 1 |
| 7 | (Kazakhstan) | MF | Ulan Konysbayev | 2 | 0 | 0 | 0 | 0 | 0 | 0 | 0 | 2 | 0 |
| 8 | (Kazakhstan) | DF | Viktor Dmitrenko | 5 | 0 | 1 | 0 | 1 | 0 | 0 | 0 | 7 | 0 |
| 9 | (Kazakhstan) | FW | Sergei Ostapenko | 3 | 0 | 0 | 0 | 0 | 0 | 0 | 0 | 3 | 0 |
| 10 | (Central African Republic) | MF | Foxi Kéthévoama | 2 | 0 | 0 | 0 | 0 | 0 | 0 | 0 | 2 | 0 |
| 12 | (Ghana) | FW | Patrick Twumasi | 1 | 0 | 0 | 0 | 0 | 0 | 0 | 0 | 1 | 0 |
| 14 | (Montenegro) | DF | Blažo Igumanović | 2 | 0 | 0 | 0 | 0 | 0 | 0 | 0 | 2 | 0 |
| 15 | (Kazakhstan) | MF | Abzal Beisebekov | 3 | 0 | 1 | 0 | 0 | 0 | 0 | 0 | 4 | 0 |
| 16 | (Kazakhstan) | DF | Yevgeni Goryachi | 1 | 0 | 0 | 0 | 0 | 0 | 0 | 0 | 1 | 0 |
| 17 | (Kazakhstan) | FW | Tanat Nusserbayev | 5 | 0 | 0 | 0 | 0 | 0 | 1 | 0 | 6 | 0 |
| 20 | (Montenegro) | MF | Damir Kojašević | 4 | 0 | 1 | 0 | 0 | 0 | 0 | 0 | 5 | 0 |
| 22 | (Kazakhstan) | MF | Marat Shakhmetov | 7 | 0 | 0 | 0 | 1 | 0 | 0 | 0 | 8 | 0 |
| 23 | (Kazakhstan) | MF | Islambek Kuat | 2 | 0 | 0 | 0 | 2 | 1 | 0 | 0 | 4 | 1 |
| 26 | (Brazil) | DF | Zelão | 6 | 0 | 0 | 0 | 0 | 0 | 0 | 0 | 6 | 0 |
| 29 | (Guinea-Bissau) | FW | Cícero | 1 | 1 | 0 | 0 | 0 | 0 | 0 | 0 | 1 | 1 |
Players who left Astana during the season:
| 13 | (Moldova) | MF | Igor Țîgîrlaș | 2 | 0 | 1 | 0 | 0 | 0 | 0 | 0 | 3 | 0 |
| | | | TOTALS | 60 | 3 | 4 | 0 | 4 | 1 | 1 | 0 | 69 | 4 |
