= 2014 FC Astana season =

FC Astana
2014 season
- Chairman: Kaisar Bekenov
- Manager: Grigori Babayan (interim) until 23 June 2014; Stanimir Stoilov from 23 June 2014
- Stadium: Astana Arena
- Premier League: 1st
- Kazakhstan Cup: Semi-final vs Aktobe
- Europa League: Play-off Round vs Villarreal
- Top goalscorer: League: Foxi Kéthévoama (16); All: Foxi Kéthévoama (20)
- Highest home attendance: 27,500 vs Villarreal (21 August 2014)
- Lowest home attendance: 1,200 vs Astana-64 (14 May 2014)
- Average home league attendance: 5,555 (1 November 2014)
Home colours	Away colours	Third colours

The 2014 FC Astana season was the sixth successive season that the club playing in the Kazakhstan Premier League, the highest tier of association football in Kazakhstan. Astana were crowned Kazakhstan Premier League Champions for the first time, reached the Semi-finals of the Kazakhstan Cup and the Play-off Round of the Europa League before falling to Villarreal.

== Squad ==
As of match played 9 November 2014

No.	Name	Nationality	Position	Date of birth (age)	Signed from	Signed in	Apps.	Goals
Goalkeepers
1	Nenad Erić	(Serbia)	GK	26 May 1982 (aged 32)	Kairat	2011	121	0
24	Denis Tolebaev	(Kazakhstan)	GK	7 February 1987 (aged 27)	Vostok	2012	0	0
35	Aleksandr Konochkin	(Kazakhstan)	GK	20 January 1994 (aged 20)	Academy	2011	0	0
78	Rimas Martinkus	(Kazakhstan)	GK	13 January 1993 (aged 21)	Academy	2011	0	0
79	Aleksandr Sidorov	(Kazakhstan)	GK	13 March 1995 (aged 19)	Academy	2011	0	0
85	Vladimir Loginovsky	(Kazakhstan)	GK	8 October 1985 (aged 29)	Zhetysu	2013	22	0
Defenders
2	Yeldos Akhmetov	(Kazakhstan)	DF	1 June 1990 (aged 24)	Taraz	2013	29	1
4	Viktor Dmitrenko	(Kazakhstan)	DF	4 April 1991 (aged 23)	Kuban Krasnodar	2012	96	4
5	Marin Aničić	(Bosnia and Herzegovina)	DF	17 August 1989 (aged 25)	Zrinjski Mostar	2014	33	0
6	Kairat Nurdauletov	(Kazakhstan)	DF	6 November 1982 (aged 32)	Tobol	2010	128	8
12	Igor Pikalkin	(Kazakhstan)	DF	19 March 1992 (aged 22)	Shakhter Karagandy	2013	28	0
16	Yevgeni Goryachi	(Kazakhstan)	DF	4 April 1991 (aged 23)	Kairat	2012	15	0
34	Adil Zhakipbaev	(Kazakhstan)	DF	23 November 1994 (aged 19)	Academy	2013	0	0
36	Chingizkhan Asylkhanuly	(Kazakhstan)	DF	8 January 1997 (aged 17)	Academy	2014	0	0
39	Farhat Dzhanibekov	(Kazakhstan)	DF	6 February 1994 (aged 20)	Academy	2014	0	0
44	Yevgeny Postnikov	(Russia)	DF	16 April 1986 (aged 28)	Shakhtyor Soligorsk	2014	24	0
55	Pavel Khalezov	(Kazakhstan)	DF	10 August 1994 (aged 20)	Academy	2014	2	0
71	Igilik Akanov	(Kazakhstan)	DF	1 October 1995 (aged 19)	Academy	2014	0	0
77	Dmitri Shomko	(Kazakhstan)	DF	19 March 1990 (aged 24)	Irtysh Pavlodar	2014	46	4
94	Birzhan Kulbekov	(Kazakhstan)	DF	22 April 1994 (aged 20)	Academy	2013	1	0
Midfielders
7	Damir Kojašević	(Montenegro)	MF	3 June 1987 (aged 27)	Budućnost Podgorica	2013	77	17
10	Foxi Kéthévoama	(Central African Republic)	MF	30 May 1986 (aged 28)	Kecskeméti	2013	98	30
13	Serikzhan Muzhikov	(Kazakhstan)	MF	17 June 1989 (aged 25)	Zhetysu	2014	26	1
15	Abzal Beisebekov	(Kazakhstan)	MF	30 November 1992 (aged 21)	Vostok	2012	90	3
19	Georgy Zhukov	(Kazakhstan)	MF	19 November 1994 (aged 19)	loan from Standard Liège	2014	23	0
25	Guy Essame	(Cameroon)	MF	25 November 1984 (aged 29)	loan from Atyrau	2014	18	0
31	Azat Smagulov	(Kazakhstan)	MF	31 July 1992 (aged 22)	Academy	2010	0	0
32	Rinat Khairullin	(Kazakhstan)	MF	19 December 1994 (aged 19)	Academy	2011	2	0
37	Islambek Kulekenov	(Kazakhstan)	MF	15 September 1994 (aged 20)	Academy	2013	1	0
41	Ardak Saulet	(Kazakhstan)	MF	12 January 1997 (aged 17)	Academy	2014	0	0
45	Alexander Sharifullin	(Kazakhstan)	MF	21 March 1995 (aged 19)	Academy	2013	0	0
47	Rasul Marua	(Kazakhstan)	MF	11 August 1993 (aged 21)	Academy	2014	0	0
63	Amanbol Aliyev	(Kazakhstan)	MF	10 July 1995 (aged 19)	Academy	2014	0	0
66	Temirlanali Begimbay	(Kazakhstan)	MF	9 September 1995 (aged 19)	Academy	2014	0	0
80	Adil Balgabayev	(Kazakhstan)	MF	13 July 1995 (aged 19)	Academy	2014	1	0
88	Roger Cañas	(Colombia)	MF	27 March 1990 (aged 24)	Shakhter Karagandy	2014	39	4
95	Madi Zamataev	(Kazakhstan)	MF	28 March 1995 (aged 19)	Academy	2013	0	0
96	Vladislav Mendybaev	(Kazakhstan)	MF	1 May 1996 (aged 18)	Academy	2013	1	0
Forwards
17	Tanat Nusserbayev	(Kazakhstan)	FW	1 January 1987 (aged 27)	Ordabasy	2011	124	35
18	Patrick Twumasi	(Ghana)	FW	9 May 1994 (aged 20)	loan from Spartaks Jūrmala	2014	28	16
22	Bauyrzhan Dzholchiyev	(Kazakhstan)	FW	8 May 1990 (aged 24)	Tobol	2014	33	9
42	Ilyas Kuanyshbay	(Kazakhstan)	FW	12 January 1997 (aged 17)	Academy	2014	0	0
76	Atanas Kurdov	(Bulgaria)	FW	28 September 1988 (aged 26)	Slavia Sofia	2014	32	7
87	Igor Popadinets	(Kazakhstan)	FW	28 February 1994 (aged 20)	Academy	2010	1	0
99	Islam Akhmetov	(Kazakhstan)	FW	3 July 1995 (aged 19)	Academy	2013	0	0
Players away on loan
8	Marat Shakhmetov	(Kazakhstan)	MF	6 February 1989 (aged 25)	Alma-Ata	2009	151	6
Players that left during the season
9	Sergei Ostapenko	(Kazakhstan)	FW	23 February 1986 (aged 28)	Zhetysu	2012	96	19
11	Cícero	(Guinea-Bissau)	FW	8 May 1986 (aged 28)	loan from Paços de Ferreira	2013	21	8
20	Renan Bressan	(Belarus)	MF	3 November 1988 (aged 26)	Aktobe	2014	7	1
21	Aleksandr Kirov	(Kazakhstan)	DF	4 September 1984 (aged 30)	Shakhter Karagandy	2013	61	3
23	Islambek Kuat	(Kazakhstan)	MF	12 January 1993 (aged 21)	Academy	2010	25	2
33	Vitali Li	(Kazakhstan)	MF	13 March 1994 (aged 20)	loan from Shakhter Karagandy	2014	6	0

== Transfers ==
=== Winter ===
In: Note: Flags indicate national team as defined under FIFA eligibility rules; some limited exceptions apply. Players may hold more than one non-FIFA nationality.

No.	Pos.	Nation	Player
5	DF	BIH	Marin Aničić (from (Bosnia and Herzegovina) Zrinjski Mostar)
13	MF	KAZ	Serikzhan Muzhikov (from (Kazakhstan) Zhetysu)
19	MF	KAZ	Georgiy Zhukov (loan from (Belgium) Standard Liège)
20	MF	BLR	Renan Bressan (from (Kazakhstan) FC Aktobe)
22	FW	KAZ	Bauyrzhan Dzholchiev (from (Kazakhstan) Tobol)
33	FW	KAZ	Vitali Lee (from (Kazakhstan) Kairat)
44	DF	RUS	Yevgeny Postnikov (from (Belarus) Shakhtyor Soligorsk)
77	DF	KAZ	Dmitri Shomko (from (Kazakhstan) Irtysh)
76	FW	BUL	Atanas Kurdov (from (Bulgaria) Slavia Sofia)
88	MF	COL	Roger Cañas (from (Kazakhstan) Shakhter Karagandy)

Out: Note: Flags indicate national team as defined under FIFA eligibility rules; some limited exceptions apply. Players may hold more than one non-FIFA nationality.

No.	Pos.	Nation	Player
3	DF	KAZ	Valeri Korobkin (to (Kazakhstan) Aktobe)
5	DF	KAZ	Kirill Pasichnik (to (Kazakhstan) Atyrau)
7	MF	KAZ	Ulan Konysbayev (to (Kazakhstan) Shakhter Karagandy)
11	MF	KAZ	Bauyrzhan Islamkhan (loan return to (Russia) Kuban Krasnodar)
12	FW	GHA	Patrick Twumasi (loan return to (Latvia) Spartaks Jūrmala)
14	DF	MNE	Blažo Igumanović (to (Montenegro) Rudar)
25	MF	KAZ	Nurdaulet Cosman
26	DF	BRA	Zelão
32	FW	KAZ	Timur Bakhriden
34	MF	KAZ	Zhumazhan Musabekov
44	MF	KAZ	Abylkayyr Ismailov
47	DF	KAZ	Dmitry Kaminsky
49	MF	KAZ	Kirill Sazonov
69	DF	KAZ	Daniil Stasyunas
69	FW	KAZ	Bimukhamed Bukeev
70	MF	KAZ	Nursultan Kurmangali
85	FW	KAZ	Daurenbek Tazhimbetov (loan return to (Kazakhstan) Shakhter Karagandy)
95	MF	KAZ	Abai Zhunusov

=== Summer ===
In: Note: Flags indicate national team as defined under FIFA eligibility rules; some limited exceptions apply. Players may hold more than one non-FIFA nationality.

No.	Pos.	Nation	Player
15	MF	KAZ	Abzal Beisebekov (loan return from (Poland) Korona Kielce)
18	FW	GHA	Patrick Twumasi (loan from (Latvia) Spartaks Jūrmala)
25	MF	CMR	Guy Essame (loan from (Kazakhstan) Atyrau)

Out: Note: Flags indicate national team as defined under FIFA eligibility rules; some limited exceptions apply. Players may hold more than one non-FIFA nationality.

No.	Pos.	Nation	Player
8	MF	KAZ	Marat Shakhmetov (loan to (Kazakhstan) Atyrau)
9	FW	KAZ	Sergei Ostapenko (to (Kazakhstan) Kaisar)
11	FW	GBS	Cícero (loan return to (Portugal) Paços Ferreira)
20	MF	BLR	Renan Bressan (to (Portugal) Rio Ave)
21	DF	KAZ	Alexander Kirov (to (Kazakhstan) Shakhter Karagandy)
23	MF	KAZ	Islambek Kuat (to (Kazakhstan) Kairat)
33	MF	KAZ	Vitali Li (to (Kazakhstan) Kairat)

== Competitions ==
=== Premier League ===
==== First round ====
===== Results summary =====
Overall								Home						Away					
Pld	W	D	L	GF	GA	GD	Pts	W	D	L	GF	GA	GD	W	D	L	GF	GA	GD
22	10	9	3	34	17	+17	39	7	3	1	24	8	+16	3	6	2	10	9	+1

Last updated: 27 July 2014.
Source: Soccerway

===== Results by round =====
Round	1	2	3	4	5	6	7	8	9	10	11	12	13	14	15	16	17	18	19	20	21	22
Ground	H	A	H	H	A	H	A	H	A	H	A	H	A	A	H	A	H	A	H	A	H	A
Result	D	W	W	W	D	W	W	L	D	W	L	D	L	W	D	D	W	D	W	D	W	D
Position	6	3	3	1	2	1	1	2	2	2	2	2	4	3	2	3	2	4	3	3	3	3

Source: Soccerway
A = Away; H = Home; W = Win; D = Draw; L = Loss

===== Results =====
15 March 2014 1	Astana	0 – 0	Zhetysu	Astana
17:00 (UTC+6)	Aničić (yellow card) 84'	Report	Klimavičius (yellow card) 90+5'	Stadium: Astana Arena; Attendance: 5,000; Referee: Bolat Karlibayev

22 March 2014 2	Ordabasy	0 – 1	Astana	Shymkent
15:00 (UTC+6)	Diakate (yellow card) 59'; Y.Tungyshbayev (yellow card) 78'	Report	Shomko (yellow card) 69'; Cícero 82'	Stadium: Kazhimukan Munaitpasov Stadium; Attendance: 5,000; Referee: Aydin Rakhimbayev

29 March 2014 3	Astana	1 – 0	Kaisar	Astana
16:00 (UTC+6)	Nurdauletov (yellow card) 9'; Shomko (yellow card) 30'; Kojašević 90+4' (pen.) (yellow card) 90+4'	Report	Coulibaly (yellow card) 14'; Maruško (yellow card) 36'; Savić (yellow card) 63'; Zemlianukhin (yellow card) 63'; N.Kunov (yellow card) 90+2'	Stadium: Astana Arena; Attendance: 3,000; Referee: Askhat Abdanbayev

5 April 2014 4	Astana	1 – 0	Taraz	Astana
16:00 (UTC+6)	Y.Akhmetov (yellow card) 19'; Dzholchiev 65'	Report	V.Evstigneev (yellow card) 26'; Shchetkin (yellow card) 28'; Barroilhet (yellow card) 35'; M.Amirkhanov (yellow card) 50'	Stadium: Astana Arena; Attendance: 4,000; Referee: Denis Izmailov

9 April 2014 5	Kairat	0 – 0	Astana	Almaty
19:00 (UTC+6)	Kislitsyn (yellow card) 57'; Yedigaryan (yellow card) 52' (red card) 90'; Pliyev (yellow card) 83' (red card) 90'; Bakayev (yellow card) 90'	Report	Kéthévoama (yellow card) 2'; Nurdauletov (yellow card) 62'; Cañas (yellow card) 90'	Stadium: Central Stadium; Attendance: 5,500; Referee: Artyom Kuchin

13 April 2014 6	Astana	1 – 0	Tobol	Astana
15:00 (UTC+6)	Dzholchiev (yellow card) 30'; Kojašević 80' (pen.); Nusserbayev (yellow card) 83'	Report	Bugaiov (yellow card) 59'; Šljivić (yellow card) 79'; Zhumaskaliyev (yellow card) 79'	Stadium: Astana Arena; Attendance: 3,000; Referee: Aleksandr Aliyev

19 April 2014 7	Irtysh	3 – 4	Astana	Pavlodar
15:00 (UTC+6)	Džudović 16'; Bakayev 28', 45' (pen.) (yellow card) 60' (yellow-red card) 68'; Chleboun (yellow card) 34'; Amanow (yellow card) 82'	Report	Nusserbayev 18'; Aničić (yellow card) 25' (yellow-red card) 45'; Cañas (yellow card) 31'; Shomko (yellow card) 31'; Kurdov (yellow card) 31' (goal) 45+1', 56', 75'	Stadium: Central Stadium; Attendance: 4,500; Referee: Aleksandr Gauzer

27 April 2014 8	Astana	1 – 2	Aktobe	Astana
15:00 (UTC+6)	Kéthévoama 15'; Cañas (yellow card) 84'; Kuat (yellow card) 88'	Report	Zenkovich 4' (yellow card) 88'; Khairullin 45'; A.Tagybergen (yellow card) 70'; P.Badlo (yellow card) 90+1'	Stadium: Astana Arena; Attendance: 8,800; Referee: Ruslan Duzmambetov

1 May 2014 9	Shakhter Karagandy	0 – 0	Astana	Karagandy
16:00 (UTC+6)		Report	Dmitrenko (yellow card) 59'; V.Lee (yellow card) 73'	Stadium: Shakhter Stadium; Attendance: 4,500; Referee: Igor Aleshin

6 May 2014 10	Astana	5 – 0	Spartak Semey	Astana
19:00 (UTC+6)	Nusserbayev 15', 52'; Kurdov (yellow card) 42'; Dmitrenko 72'; Kéthévoama 76'; Cícero 89'	Report	A.Sakenov (yellow card) 33'; Kutsov (yellow card) 36'; Samchenko (yellow card) 37'	Stadium: Astana Arena; Attendance: 1,500; Referee: Aydin Rakhimbayev

10 May 2014 11	Atyrau	1 – 0	Astana	Atyrau
17:00 (UTC+6)	Odibe (red card) 2'; Trifunović 30' (pen.); Blažić (yellow card) 61'; A.Shabanov (yellow card) 88'	Report		Stadium: Munaishy Stadium; Attendance: 3,000; Referee: Akmalkhan Kholmatov

18 May 2014 12	Astana	1 – 1	Ordabasy	Astana
15:00 (UTC+6)	Dzholchiev 18'; Muzhikov (yellow card) 34'; Nusserbayev (yellow card) 75'	Report	P.Aliyev (yellow card) 18'; Diakate 26'	Stadium: Astana Arena; Attendance: 2,500; Referee: Viktor Antonov

24 May 2014 13	Kaisar	1 – 0	Astana	Kyzylorda
19:00 (UTC+6)	Dmitrenko 7' (o.g.); Shestakov (yellow card) 30'; D.Dautov (yellow card) 37'; K.Pryadkin (yellow card) 90+5'	Report	Dzholchiev (yellow card) 34'; Aničić (yellow card) 90+2'	Stadium: Gany Muratbayev Stadium; Attendance: 6,000; Referee: Denis Izmailov

28 May 2014 14	Taraz	1 – 2	Astana	Taraz
18:00 (UTC+6)	Tleshev 68'	Report	Y.Akhmetov (yellow card) 30'; Dzholchiev 63'; Shakhmetov (yellow card) 66'; Kurdov 84'; Cañas (yellow card) 90+4'	Stadium: Central Stadium; Attendance: 3,800; Referee: Igor Khisamutdinov

1 June 2014 15	Astana	2 – 2	Kairat	Astana
17:00 (UTC+6)	Bressan 29'; Dzholchiev 34'; Muzhikov (yellow card) 83'	Report	Pliyev 39' (yellow card) 76'; Gurman (yellow card) 63'; A.Darabayev 65'; Bakayev (yellow card) 71'	Stadium: Astana Arena; Attendance: 2,000; Referee: Igor Aleshin

14 June 2014 16	Tobol	1 – 1	Astana	Kostanay
16:00 (UTC+6)	Šimkovič 90' (yellow card) 90+1'	Report	Y.Akhmetov (yellow card) 55'; Kéthévoama 60'; Shakhmetov (yellow card) 74'; Loginovskiy (yellow card) 90+1'	Stadium: Central Stadium; Attendance: 5,000; Referee: Akmmalkhan Kholmatov

22 June 2014 17	Astana	5 – 3	Irtysh	Astana
17:00 (UTC+6)	Kéthévoama 5'; Cícero 17', 62'; Kojašević 32'; Shomko (yellow card) 66'; Dzholchiev 90+1'	Report	Bakayev 23'; Dudchenko 31'; A.Totay 47'; Starokin (yellow card) 61'	Stadium: Astana Arena; Attendance: 1,500; Referee: Artyom Kuchin

27 June 2014 18	Aktobe	1 – 1	Astana	Aktobe
21:00 (UTC+6)	Korobkin 3'; Antonov (yellow card) 65'; Neco (yellow card) 79'	Report	Cícero 32'; Kéthévoama (yellow card) 38'	Stadium: Central Stadium; Attendance: 11,000; Referee: Aydin Rakhimbayev

6 July 2014 19	Astana	4 – 0	Shakhter Karagandy	Astana
15:00 (UTC+6)	Kojašević (yellow card) 6'; Beisebekov 25'; Kéthévoama 29'; Zhukov (yellow card) 62'; Dzholchiev 64'; Aničić (yellow card) 72'; Nusserbayev 85'	Report	A.Borantayev (yellow card) 6'; Đidić (red card) 34'	Stadium: Astana Arena; Attendance: 3,000; Referee: Ruslan Duzmambetov

12 July 2014 20	Spartak Semey	1 – 1	Astana	Semey
(UTC+6)	Peev 42'; A.Sakenov (yellow card) 70'	Report	Postnikov (yellow card) 60'; Kéthévoama (yellow card) 77'; Obradović 82' (o.g.)	Stadium: Spartak Stadium; Attendance: 4,000; Referee: Bolat Karlibayev

27 July 2014 21	Astana	3 – 0	Atyrau	Astana
16:00 (UTC+6)	Kéthévoama 26', 56', 90+3' (yellow card) 90+4'	Report	Adiyiah (yellow card) 54'	Stadium: Astana Arena; Attendance: 3,500; Referee: Askhat Abdanbayev

3 August 2014 22	Zhetysu	0 – 0	Astana	Taldykorgan
18:00 (UTC+6)	Kovalev (yellow card) 47'; R.Esatov (yellow card) 55'; Goa (yellow card) 88'	Report	Dmitrenko (yellow card) 27'; Nusserbayev (yellow card) 89'	Stadium: Zhetysu Stadium; Attendance: 3,000; Referee: Igor Aleshin

===== League table =====
Pos	Team	Pld	W	D	L	GF	GA	GD	Pts	Qualification
1	Aktobe	22	12	7	3	34	17	+17	43	Qualification for the championship round
2	Kairat	22	13	3	6	41	20	+21	42	Qualification for the championship round
3	Astana	22	10	9	3	34	17	+17	39	Qualification for the championship round
4	Shakhter Karagandy	22	11	3	8	33	27	+6	36	Qualification for the championship round
5	Ordabasy	22	10	5	7	24	22	+2	35	Qualification for the championship round

Source: Soccerway (in Russian)
Rules for classification: 1st points;
Two team tiebreak: 1st overall wins; 2nd head-to-head record; 3rd goals difference; 4th goals scored; 5th away goals scored;
Multiple teams tiebreak: 1st overall wins; 2nd goals difference; 3rd goals scored; 4th away goals scored

==== Championship Round ====
===== Results summary =====
Overall								Home						Away					
Pld	W	D	L	GF	GA	GD	Pts	W	D	L	GF	GA	GD	W	D	L	GF	GA	GD
10	8	1	1	28	9	+19	25	5	0	0	20	2	+18	3	1	1	8	7	+1

Last updated: 9 November 2014.
Source: Soccerway

===== Results by round =====
Round	1	2	3	4	5	6	7	8	9	10
Ground	H	H	A	H	A	H	A	H	A	A
Result	W	W	D	W	W	W	W	W	L	W
Position	2	2	2	2	2	1	1	1	1	1

Source: Soccerway
A = Away; H = Home; W = Win; D = Draw; L = Loss

===== Results =====
22 August 2014 1	Astana	Postponed	Kairat	Astana
(UTC+6)		Report		Stadium: Astana Arena

28 August 2014 2	Aktobe	Postponed	Astana	Aktobe
(UTC+6)		Report		Stadium: Central Stadium

14 September 2014 3	Astana	5 – 0	Ordabasy	Astana
18:00 (UTC+6)	Twumasi 2', 74'; Kéthévoama 13', 84'; Nusserbayev 34' (yellow card) 55'; Aničić (yellow card) 80'	Report	P.Aliyev (yellow card) 16'; G.Suyumbaev (yellow card) 86'	Stadium: Astana Arena; Attendance: 2,500; Referee: Aleksandr Gauzer

20 September 2014 4	Astana	2 – 0	Shakhter Karagandy	Astana
17:00 (UTC+6)	Shomko 36'; Twumasi 48'	Report	Malyi (yellow card) 25'; Konysbayev (yellow card) 78'; S.Bauyrzhan (yellow card) 87'	Stadium: Astana Arena; Attendance: 3,500; Referee: Askhat Abdanbayev

28 September 2014 5	Kaisar	1 – 1	Astana	Kyzylorda
17:00 (UTC+6)	R.Rozybakiev (yellow card) 32'; Zemlianukhin 58'	Report	Nusserbayev (yellow card) 50'; Beisebekov (yellow card) 57'; Cañas 90+3'	Stadium: Gany Muratbayev Stadium; Attendance: 4,000; Referee: Ruslan Duzmambetov

4 October 2014 6	Astana	6 – 1	Aktobe	Astana
18:30 (UTC+6)	Twumasi 41', 52', 75'; Kéthévoama 51', 65'; Dzholchiev (yellow card) 71'; Kojašević 87' (pen.)	Report	Tsarikayev (yellow card) 4'; P.Badlo (yellow card) 35'; Antonov 57'	Stadium: Astana Arena; Attendance: 4,000; Referee: Denis Izmailov

18 October 2014 7	Ordabasy	1 – 2	Astana	Shymkent
16:00 (UTC+6)	Mwesigwa (yellow card) 27'; Tazhimbetov 65'; A.Diakate (yellow card) 68'; Kudela (yellow card) 76'; B.Kozhabayev (yellow card) 80'	Report	Kéthévoama 14'; Twumasi 57'; Erić (yellow card) 82'	Stadium: Kazhimukan Munaitpasov Stadium; Attendance: 3,000; Referee: Aleksandr Gauzer

22 October 2014 1	Astana	5 – 1	Kairat	Astana
19:30 (UTC+6)	Cañas 44', 45'; Nusserbayev 47' (yellow card) 61'; Aničić (yellow card) 81'; Kéthévoama 85'; Twumasi 87'	Report	Isael 5'; Gohou (yellow card) 49'; Pliyev (yellow card) 61'; Islamkhan (yellow card) 83'	Stadium: Astana Arena; Attendance: 4,500; Referee: Akmalkhan Kholmatov

25 October 2014 8	Shakhter Karagandy	0 – 2	Astana	Karagandy
16:00 (UTC+6)	Salomov (yellow card) 33'	Report	Kurdov 33' (pen.), 80'	Stadium: Shakhter Stadium; Attendance: 1,500; Referee: Igor Aleshin

1 November 2014 9	Astana	3 – 0	Kaisar	Astana
18:00 (UTC+6)	Twumasi 13'; Shomko 71'; Kéthévoama 78'	Report	Furdui (yellow card) 27'; R.Rozybakiev (yellow card) 40'; I.Kalinin (yellow card) 48'; Jablan (yellow card) 77'	Stadium: Astana Arena; Attendance: 3,500; Referee: Denis Izmailov

5 November 2014 2	Aktobe	3 – 0	Astana	Aktobe
18:00 (UTC+6)	Antonov 41'; A.Tagybergen 45'; Arzumanyan (yellow card) 69'; Khairullin 90+3'	Report	R.Khairullin (yellow card) 29'; Beisebekov (yellow card) 29'; Y.Akhmetov (yellow card) 60'	Stadium: Central Stadium

9 November 2014 10	Kairat	2 – 3	Astana	Almaty
15:00 (UTC+6)	Islamkhan (yellow card) 19'; Gohou 60', 90+4' (yellow card) 70'; Marković (yellow card) 63'; Yedigaryan (yellow card) 65'	Report	Twumasi 4'; Cañas (yellow card) 21'; Muzhikov 36'; Kéthévoama 53'	Stadium: Central Stadium; Attendance: 6,000; Referee: Igor Khisamutdinov

===== Table =====
Pos	Team	Pld	W	D	L	GF	GA	GD	Pts	Qualification
1	Astana (C)	32	18	10	4	63	26	+37	45	Qualification for the Champions League second qualifying round
2	Aktobe	32	17	10	5	52	31	+21	40	Qualification for the Europa League first qualifying round
3	Kairat	32	18	5	9	58	31	+27	38	Qualification for the Europa League first qualifying round
4	Ordabasy	32	13	5	14	34	44	−10	27	Qualification for the Europa League first qualifying round
5	Kaisar	32	10	13	9	30	34	−4	27	

Source: Soccerway (in Russian)
Rules for classification: 1st points;
Two team tiebreak: 1st overall wins; 2nd head-to-head record; 3rd goals difference; 4th goals scored; 5th away goals scored;
Multiple teams tiebreak: 1st overall wins; 2nd goals difference; 3rd goals scored; 4th away goals scored.
Team start with half number of points from first round.
(C) Champions

=== Kazakhstan Cup ===
14 May 2014 Second Round	Astana	1 – 0	Astana-64	Astana
19:00 (UTC+6)	Dzholchiev (yellow card) 28'; Y.Akhmetov (yellow card) 51'; Ostapenko 61'	Report	Alakbarzade (yellow card) 47'	Stadium: Astana Arena; Attendance: 1,200; Referee: Bagdat Abdullaev

18 June 2014 Quarter-final	Astana	4 – 0	Tobol	Astana
19:00 (UTC+6)	Kojašević 45', 47'; Cícero 76'; Shomko (yellow card) 81'; Kéthévoama 87'	Report	Tonev (yellow card) 44'	Stadium: Astana Arena; Attendance: 2,000; Referee: Alexander Gauzer

16 August 2014 Semi Final 1st leg	Aktobe	1 – 1	Astana	Aktobe
21:00 (UTC+6)	Tsarikayev (yellow card) 49'; Pizzelli 63'	Report	Y.Akhmetov (yellow card) 24'; Kéthévoama 26' (yellow card) 39'	Stadium: Central Stadium; Attendance: 9,000; Referee: Aydin Rakhimbayev

24 September 2014 Semi Final 2nd leg	Astana	1 – 1 (a.e.t.) (2 – 2 agg.) (3 – 4 p)	Aktobe	Astana
18:00 (UTC+6)	Loginovskiy (yellow card) 19'; Nusserbayev 41'; Y.Goryachi (yellow card) 62'	Report	Pizzelli 20' (pen.) (yellow card) 90+1'; Khairullin (yellow card) 28'	Stadium: Astana Arena; Attendance: 4,000; Referee: Akmalkhan Kholmatov

=== UEFA Europa League ===
==== Qualifying rounds ====
3 July 2014 First qualifying round 1st leg	Pyunik (Armenia)	1 – 4	(Kazakhstan) Astana	Yerevan, Armenia
20:00 (UTC+6)	G.Poghosyan (yellow card) 44'; Papikyan 68'	Report	Nusserbayev 40'; Cañas (yellow card) 60'; Dzholchiev 67'; Kéthévoama 71'; Kurdov 84'	Stadium: Football Academy Stadium; Attendance: 1,380; Referee: Tomasz Musiał (Poland)

10 July 2014 First qualifying round 2nd leg	Astana (Kazakhstan)	2 – 0 (6 – 1 agg.)	(Armenia) Pyunik	Astana, Kazakhstan
19:00 (UTC+6)	Dzholchiev 13'; Beisebekov (yellow card) 49'; Shomko 79'	Report	Haroyan (yellow card) 49'; Voskanyan (yellow card) 84'	Stadium: Astana Arena; Attendance: 7,200; Referee: Sergey Tsinkevich (Belarus)

17 July 2014 Second qualifying round 1st leg	Astana (Kazakhstan)	3 – 0	(Israel) Hapoel Tel Aviv	Astana, Kazakhstan
19:00 (UTC+6)	Cañas 16' (pen.) (yellow card) 66'; Zhukov (yellow card) 30'; Beisebekov (yellow card) 48' (goal) 69'; Nusserbayev 58'	Report	Dgani (red card) 15'; Zaguri (yellow card) 77'	Stadium: Astana Arena; Attendance: 10,800; Referee: Sergei Ivanov (Russia)

25 July 2014 Second qualifying round 2nd leg	Hapoel Tel Aviv (Israel)	1 – 0 (1 – 3 agg.)	(Kazakhstan) Astana	Larnaca, Cyprus
00:00 (UTC+6)	Lucas Sasha 57' (pen.)	Report		Stadium: Antonis Papadopoulos Stadium; Attendance: 200; Referee: Rob Rogers (Republic of Ireland)

31 July 2014 Third qualifying round 1st leg	Astana (Kazakhstan)	1 – 1	(Sweden) AIK	Astana, Kazakhstan
20:00 (UTC+6)	Cañas (yellow card) 12'; Nusserbayev 42'; Dzholchiev (yellow card) 59'; Dmitrenko (yellow card) 80'	Report	Bahoui 9' (yellow card) 60'; Salétros (yellow card) 65'; Milošević (yellow card) 81'; Pavey (yellow card) 85'; Johansson (yellow card) 88'	Stadium: Astana Arena; Attendance: 16,200; Referee: Ante Vučemilović-Šimunović Jr. (Croatia)

8 August 2014 Third qualifying round 2nd leg	AIK (Sweden)	0 – 3 (1 – 4 agg.)	(Kazakhstan) Astana	Solna, Sweden
00:00 (UTC+6)	Borges (yellow card) 68' (yellow-red card) 84'	Report	Aničić (yellow card) 33'; Kéthévoama 36'; Zhukov (yellow card) 52'; Shomko 54'; Dzholchiev (yellow card) 68' (goal) 71'	Stadium: Friends Arena; Attendance: 12,314; Referee: Michael Koukoulakis (Greece)

21 August 2014 Play-off round 1st leg	Astana (Kazakhstan)	0 – 3	(Spain) Villarreal	Astana, Kazakhstan
21:00 (UTC+6)	Postnikov (yellow card) 20' Aničić (yellow card) 26' (yellow-red card) 60'	Report	Cani 33'; G. dos Santos 48'; Costa (yellow card) 55'; Mario 84'	Stadium: Astana Arena; Attendance: 27,500; Referee: Bas Nijhuis (Netherlands)

29 August 2014 Play-off round 2nd leg	Villarreal (Spain)	4 – 0 (7 – 0 agg.)	(Kazakhstan) Astana	Villarreal, Spain
00:45 (UTC+6)	Vietto 21', 54'; Pina (yellow card) 30'; Bruno 61' (pen.); Nahuel 67'	Report	Dzholchiev (yellow card) 18'; Shomko (yellow card) 37'; Twumasi (yellow card) 60'	Stadium: El Madrigal; Attendance: 11,564; Referee: Liran Liany (Israel)

== Squad statistics ==
As of Match played 9 November 2014

=== Appearances and goals ===
No.	Pos	Nat	Player	Total		Premier League		Kazakhstan Cup		UEFA Europa League	
No.	Pos	Nat	Player	Apps	Goals	Apps	Goals	Apps	Goals	Apps	Goals
1	GK	(Serbia) SRB	Nenad Erić	23	0	14	0	2	0	7	0
2	DF	(Kazakhstan) KAZ	Yeldos Akhmetov	20	0	9+4	0	2+1	0	3+1	0
4	DF	(Kazakhstan) KAZ	Viktor Dmitrenko	36	1	23+3	1	3+1	0	6	0
5	DF	(Bosnia and Herzegovina) BIH	Marin Aničić	33	0	27	0	2	0	4	0
6	DF	(Kazakhstan) KAZ	Kairat Nurdauletov	21	0	13+7	0	0	0	1	0
7	FW	(Montenegro) MNE	Damir Kojašević	27	6	5+16	4	2+1	2	1+2	0
10	MF	(Central African Republic) CAF	Foxi Kéthévoama	35	20	25	16	2	2	7+1	2
12	DF	(Kazakhstan) KAZ	Igor Pikalkin	26	0	18+2	0	2	0	3+1	0
13	MF	(Kazakhstan) KAZ	Serikzhan Muzhikov	26	1	10+7	1	3	0	0+6	0
15	MF	(Kazakhstan) KAZ	Abzal Beisebekov	26	2	13+2	1	2+1	0	7+1	1
16	DF	(Kazakhstan) KAZ	Yevgeni Goryachi	3	0	1	0	2	0	0	0
17	FW	(Kazakhstan) KAZ	Tanat Nusserbayev	37	10	19+7	6	1+2	1	8	3
18	FW	(Ghana) GHA	Patrick Twumasi	17	10	10+1	10	1	0	1+4	0
19	MF	(Kazakhstan) KAZ	Georgy Zhukov	23	0	5+7	0	3	0	7+1	0
22	FW	(Kazakhstan) KAZ	Bauyrzhan Dzholchiev	33	9	18+6	6	2	0	7	3
25	MF	(Cameroon) CMR	Guy Essame	18	0	10+1	0	1	0	5+1	0
32	MF	(Kazakhstan) KAZ	Rinat Khairullin	2	0	1	0	1	0	0	0
37	MF	(Kazakhstan) KAZ	Islambek Kulekenov	1	0	0+1	0	0	0	0	0
44	DF	(Russia) RUS	Yevgeny Postnikov	24	0	12+2	0	3	0	7	0
55	DF	(Kazakhstan) KAZ	Pavel Khalezov	2	0	0+1	0	0+1	0	0	0
76	FW	(Bulgaria) BUL	Atanas Kurdov	32	7	16+9	6	0+2	0	1+4	1
77	DF	(Kazakhstan) KAZ	Dmitri Shomko	34	4	27	2	1	0	5+1	2
80	MF	(Kazakhstan) KAZ	Adil Balgabayev	1	0	0+1	0	0	0	0	0
85	GK	(Kazakhstan) KAZ	Vladimir Loginovskiy	21	0	18	0	2	0	1	0
87	FW	(Kazakhstan) KAZ	Igor Popadinets	1	0	0	0	0+1	0	0	0
88	MF	(Colombia) COL	Roger Cañas	39	4	29+1	3	2	0	7	1
94	DF	(Kazakhstan) KAZ	Birzhan Kulbekov	1	0	0	0	0+1	0	0	0
96	MF	(Kazakhstan) KAZ	Vladislav Mendybaev	1	0	1	0	0	0	0	0
Players away from Astana on loan:
8	MF	(Kazakhstan) KAZ	Marat Shakhmetov	14	0	9+3	0	1	0	0+1	0
Players who appeared for Astana that left during the season:
9	FW	(Kazakhstan) KAZ	Sergei Ostapenko	8	1	2+5	0	1	1	0	0
11	FW	(Guinea-Bissau) GBS	Cícero	13	6	11+1	5	1	1	0	0
20	MF	(Belarus) BLR	Renan Bressan	7	1	3+3	1	1	0	0	0
23	MF	(Kazakhstan) KAZ	Islambek Kuat	3	0	0+2	0	1	0	0	0
33	FW	(Kazakhstan) KAZ	Vitali Lee	6	0	3+2	0	0+1	0	0	0

=== Goal scorers ===
Place	Position	Nation	Number	Name	Premier League	Kazakhstan Cup	UEFA Europa League	Total
1	MF	(Central African Republic)	10	Foxi Kéthévoama	16	2	2	20
2	FW	(Ghana)	18	Patrick Twumasi	10	0	0	10
2	FW	(Kazakhstan)	17	Tanat Nusserbayev	6	1	3	10
4	FW	(Kazakhstan)	22	Bauyrzhan Dzholchiev	6	0	3	9
5	FW	(Bulgaria)	76	Atanas Kurdov	6	0	1	7
6	FW	(Guinea-Bissau)	11	Cícero	5	1	0	6
6	FW	(Montenegro)	7	Damir Kojašević	4	2	0	6
8	MF	(Colombia)	88	Roger Cañas	3	0	1	4
8	DF	(Kazakhstan)	77	Dmitri Shomko	2	0	2	4
10	MF	(Kazakhstan)	15	Abzal Beisebekov	1	0	1	2
11	DF	(Kazakhstan)	4	Viktor Dmitrenko	1	0	0	1
11	MF	(Belarus)	20	Renan Bressan	1	0	0	1
11	MF	(Kazakhstan)	13	Serikzhan Muzhikov	1	0	0	1
11	FW	(Kazakhstan)	9	Sergei Ostapenko	0	1	0	1
11				Own goal	1	0	0	1
				TOTALS	63	7	13	83

=== Clean sheets ===
Place	Position	Nation	Number	Name	Premier League	Kazakhstan Cup	UEFA Europa League	Total
1	GK	(Serbia)	1	Nenad Erić	6	1	3	10
2	GK	(Kazakhstan)	85	Vladimir Loginovsky	8	1	0	9
				TOTALS	14	2	3	19

=== Disciplinary record ===
Number	Nation	Position	Name	Premier League		Kazakhstan Cup		UEFA Europa League		Total	
Number	Nation	Position	Name	Yellow card	Red card	Yellow card	Red card	Yellow card	Red card	Yellow card	Red card
1	(Serbia)	GK	Nenad Erić	1	0	0	0	0	0	1	0
2	(Kazakhstan)	DF	Yeldos Akhmetov	4	0	2	0	0	0	6	0
4	(Kazakhstan)	DF	Viktor Dmitrenko	2	0	0	0	1	0	3	0
5	(Bosnia and Herzegovina)	DF	Marin Aničić	6	1	0	0	3	1	9	2
6	(Kazakhstan)	MF	Kairat Nurdauletov	2	0	0	0	0	0	2	0
7	(Montenegro)	MF	Damir Kojašević	2	0	0	0	0	0	2	0
10	(Central African Republic)	MF	Foxi Kéthévoama	4	0	1	0	0	0	5	0
13	(Kazakhstan)	MF	Serikzhan Muzhikov	2	0	0	0	0	0	2	0
15	(Kazakhstan)	MF	Abzal Beisebekov	2	0	0	0	2	0	4	0
16	(Kazakhstan)	DF	Yevgeni Goryachi	0	0	1	0	0	0	1	0
17	(Kazakhstan)	FW	Tanat Nusserbayev	6	0	0	0	0	0	6	0
18	(Ghana)	FW	Patrick Twumasi	0	0	0	0	1	0	1	0
19	(Belgium)	MF	Georgiy Zhukov	1	0	0	0	2	0	3	0
22	(Kazakhstan)	FW	Bauyrzhan Dzholchiev	3	0	1	0	3	0	7	0
32	(Kazakhstan)	MF	Rinat Khairullin	1	0	0	0	0	0	1	0
44	(Russia)	DF	Yevgeny Postnikov	1	0	0	0	1	0	2	0
76	(Bulgaria)	FW	Atanas Kurdov	2	0	0	0	0	0	2	0
77	(Kazakhstan)	DF	Dmitri Shomko	4	0	1	0	1	0	6	0
85	(Kazakhstan)	GK	Vladimir Loginovskiy	1	0	1	0	0	0	2	0
88	(Colombia)	MF	Roger Cañas	5	0	0	0	3	0	8	0
Players who left Astana during the season:
8	(Kazakhstan)	MF	Marat Shakhmetov	2	0	0	0	0	0	2	0
23	(Kazakhstan)	MF	Islambek Kuat	1	0	0	0	0	0	1	0
33	(Kazakhstan)	FW	Vitali Lee	1	0	0	0	0	0	1	0
			TOTALS	53	1	7	0	17	1	77	2

== Notes ==
Notes

1. Due to Operation Protective Edge, the UEFA Emergency Panel decided that Israeli clubs must play their home legs outside of the country in the second qualifying round.
