= 2013 Kazakhstan Premier League =

Kazakhstan Premier League
- Season: 2013
- Champions: Aktobe
- Relegated: Vostok; Akzhayik
- Champions League: Aktobe
- Europa League: Astana; Kairat; Shakhter Karagandy
- Matches: 134
- Goals: 298 (2.22 per match)
- Top goalscorer: (Belarus) Igor Zenkovich (Shakhter Karagandy, 15 goals)
- Biggest home win: Tobol 5–1 Astana (R1); Akzhayik 4–0 Atyrau (R11); Zhetysu 5–1 Akzhayik (R17); Shakhter 4–0 Akzhayik (R22)
- Biggest away win: Zhetysu 1–4 Tobol (R11)
- Highest scoring: Kairat 3–3 Zhetysu (R1); Tobol 5–1 Astana (R1); Kairat 4–2 Tobol (R5); Ordabasy 4–2 Akzhayik (R8); Zhetysu 5–1 Akzhayik (R17)

The 2013 Kazakhstan Premier League was the 22nd season of the Kazakhstan Premier League, the highest football league competition in Kazakhstan. The season began on 9 March 2013 and ended on 2 November. Shakhter Karagandy were the defending champions, having won their second league championship the previous year.

== Changes from 2012 season ==
The league was reduced from fourteen to twelve teams for this season.

== Teams ==
For the 2013 season, the league changed from 14 teams to 12, meaning the bottom two teams from the previous season, Sunkar and Okzhetpes, along with Kaisar were relegated to the Kazakhstan First Division with only Vostok, the second place team, gaining promotion.

=== Team overview ===
Locations of teams in the 2013 Kazakhstan Premier League

Team	Location	Venue	Capacity
Aktobe	Aktobe	Aktobe Central Stadium	13,500
Akzhayik	Oral	Petr Atoyan Stadium	8,320
Astana	Astana	Astana Arena	30,000
Atyrau	Atyrau	Munaishy Stadium	9,000
Irtysh	Pavlodar	Pavlodar Central Stadium	15,000
Kairat	Almaty	Almaty Central Stadium	25,057
Ordabasy	Shymkent	Kazhimukan Munaitpasov Stadium	37,000
Shakhter	Karagandy	Shakhter Stadium	19,000
Taraz	Taraz	Taraz Central Stadium	12,525
Tobol	Kostanay	Kostanay Central Stadium	8,323
Vostok	Oskemen	Vostok Stadium	8,500
Zhetysu	Taldykorgan	Zhetysu Stadium	4,000

=== Personnel and kits ===
Note: Flags indicate national team as has been defined under FIFA eligibility rules. Players and Managers may hold more than one non-FIFA nationality.

Team	Manager	Captain	Kit manufacturer	Shirt sponsor
Aktobe	(Kazakhstan) Vladimir Nikitenko	(Kazakhstan) Petr Badlo	adidas	—
Akzhayik	(Serbia) Ljupko Petrović	(Kazakhstan) Ruslan Khairov	Puma	—
Astana	(Romania) Ioan Andone	(Kazakhstan) Kairat Nurdauletov	adidas	Qazaqstan Temir Zholy
Atyrau	(Montenegro) Miodrag Radulović	(Kazakhstan) Valentin Chureev	adidas	—
Irtysh	(Kazakhstan) Talgat Baisufinov	(Kazakhstan) Sergei Ivanov	adidas	ENRC
Kairat	(Slovakia) Vladimír Weiss	(Kazakhstan) Kyril Shestakov	Nike	KazRosGaz
Ordabasy	(Kazakhstan) Vakhid Masudov	(Kazakhstan) Kairat Ashirbekov	adidas	TAU
Shakhter	(Russia) Viktor Kumykov	(Kazakhstan) Andrey Finonchenko	Nike	—
Taraz	(Netherlands) Arno Pijpers	(Kazakhstan) Vitali Yevstigneyev	adidas	—
Tobol	(Kazakhstan) Sergei Maslenov	(Kazakhstan) Nurbol Zhumaskaliyev	adidas	—
Vostok	(Kazakhstan) Vladimir Fomichyov	(Kazakhstan) Roman Nesterenko	Umbro	—
Zhetysu	(Russia) Omari Tetradze	(Kazakhstan) Zahar Korobov	adidas	—

=== Managerial changes ===
Team	Outgoing manager	Manner of departure	Date of vacancy	Position in table	Replaced by	Date of appointment
Kairat	(Spain) José Pérez Serer	End of contract	November 2012	Pre-Season	(Slovakia) Vladimír Weiss	November 2012
Ordabasy	(Ukraine) Viktor Pasulko	End of contract	November 2012	Pre-Season	(Kazakhstan) Vakhid Masudov	December 2012
Aktobe	(Russia) Vladimir Mukhanov	Resign	November 2012	Pre-Season	(Kazakhstan) Vladimir Nikitenko	December 2012
Atyrau	(Kazakhstan) Yuri Skates	End of contract	November 2012	Pre-Season	(Montenegro) Miodrag Radulović	December 2012
Akzhayik	(Slovakia) Jozef Škrlík	End of contract	November 2012	Pre-Season	(Armenia) Poghos Galstyan	February 2013
Vostok	(Kazakhstan) Paul Evteev		December 2012	Pre-Season	(Kazakhstan) Vladimir Fomichyov	December 2012
Tobol	(Ukraine) Vyacheslav Hrozny	End of contract	December 2012	Pre-Season	(Kazakhstan) Sergei Maslenov	December 2012
Zhetysu	(Serbia) Slobodan Krčmarević	Sacked	December 2012	Pre-Season	(Russia) Omari Tetradze	February 2013

=== Foreign players ===
The number of foreign players is restricted to eight per KPL team. A team can use only five foreign players on the field in each game.

Club	Player 1	Player 2	Player 3	Player 4	Player 5	Player 6	Player 7	Player 8
Aktobe	(Ukraine) Petr Badlo	(Trinidad and Tobago) **Robert Primus**	(Armenia) **Robert Arzumanyan**	(Moldova) **Serghei Covalciuc**	(Uzbekistan) **Timur Kapadze**	(Russia) Sergei Davydov		
Akzhayik	(Czech Republic) Jakub Chleboun	(Czech Republic) Pavel Černý	(Cameroon) **Haman Sadjo**					
Astana	(Serbia) Nenad Erić	(Central African Republic) **Foxi Kéthévoama**	(Ghana) Patrick Twumasi	(Montenegro) **Blažo Igumanović**	(Montenegro) Damir Kojašević	(Brazil) Zelão	(Guinea-Bissau) **Cícero**	
Atyrau	(Serbia) Jovan Golić	(Georgia (country)) George Peikrishvili	(Russia) Artyom Fomin	(Montenegro) Miloš Stojčev	(Serbia) **Đorđe Tutorić**	(Serbia) Nenad Injac	(Croatia) Robert Alviž	(Serbia) Nikola Milanković
Irtysh	(Serbia) Nemanja Džodžo	(Belarus) **Alyaksandr Kulchy**	(Serbia) Predrag Govedarica	(Mali) **Mamoutou Coulibaly**	(Russia) Sergei Strukov	(Uzbekistan) **Ulugbek Bakayev**	(Czech Republic) Štěpán Kučera	(Uzbekistan) **Kamoliddin Murzoev**
Kairat	(Ghana) Daniel Addo	(Scotland) Stuart Duff	(Croatia) Josip Knežević	(Finland) **Alexei Eremenko**	(Slovakia) **Ľubomír Michalík**	(The Gambia) **Momodou Ceesay**	(Armenia) **Artur Yedigaryan**	
Ordabasy	(Uganda) **Andrew Mwesigwa**	(Senegal) Gueye Mansour	(Ukraine) Artem Kasyanov	(Georgia (country)) Davit Chagelishvili	(Brazil) Andrezinho	(Croatia) Edin Junuzović	(Nigeria) Baba Collins	(Tunisia) Mohamed Arouri
Shakhter Karagandy	(Lithuania) **Gediminas Vičius**	(Bosnia and Herzegovina) **Nikola Vasiljević**	(Belarus) **Andrey Paryvayew**	(Bosnia and Herzegovina) Aldin Đidić	(Armenia) **Gevorg Ghazaryan**	(Belarus) Ihar Zyankovich	(Serbia) Aleksandar Simčević	(Colombia) Roger Cañas
Taraz	(Serbia) Ersin Mehmedović	(Senegal) Abdoulaye Diakate	(Russia) Nikolai Nesterenko	(Serbia) Miroslav Lečić	(Serbia) Vukašin Tomić	(Cameroon) Titi Essomba	(Serbia) Marko Ranđelović	(Nigeria) Obiora Odita
Tobol	(Brazil) Jhonnes	(North Macedonia) **Mensur Kurtiši**	(Serbia) Nenad Šljivić	(Moldova) **Igor Bugaiov**	(Russia) Vitali Volkov	(Russia) Aleksandr Alumona	(North Macedonia) Nikola Tonev	(Serbia) Ognjen Krasić
Vostok	(Czech Republic) Martin Komárek	(Trinidad and Tobago) **Radanfah Abu Bakr**	(El Salvador) **Ramón Sánchez**	(The Gambia) **Ebrima Sohna**	(Guyana) **Walter Moore**	(Senegal) Papa Niang		
Zhetysu	(Bosnia and Herzegovina) **Mehmedalija Čović**	(Tajikistan) **Davron Ergashev**	(Uzbekistan) **Shavkat Salomov**	(Uzbekistan) **Ruslan Melziddinov**	(Lithuania) **Arūnas Klimavičius**	(Serbia) **Marko Đalović**	(Serbia) **Ivan Perić**	

In bold: Players that have been capped for their national team.

== First round ==
=== League table ===
Pos	Team	Pld	W	D	L	GF	GA	GD	Pts	Qualification
1	Aktobe	22	14	5	3	30	12	+18	47	Qualification for the championship round
2	Astana	22	12	5	5	35	24	+11	41	Qualification for the championship round
3	Shakhter Karagandy	22	10	5	7	31	23	+8	35	Qualification for the championship round
4	Irtysh Pavlodar	22	9	7	6	24	20	+4	34	Qualification for the championship round
5	Kairat	22	7	10	5	28	24	+4	31	Qualification for the championship round
6	Ordabasy	22	8	6	8	20	20	0	30	Qualification for the championship round
7	Atyrau	22	7	6	9	18	28	−10	27	Qualification for the relegation round
8	Tobol	22	7	5	10	30	27	+3	26	Qualification for the relegation round
9	Vostok	22	5	8	9	12	24	−12	23	Qualification for the relegation round
10	Zhetysu (Note: Zhetysu were deducted 3 points.)	22	4	12	6	20	25	−5	21	Qualification for the relegation round
11	Taraz	22	4	6	12	19	29	−10	18	Qualification for the relegation round
12	Akzhayik (Note: Akzhayik were deducted 6 points.)	22	4	7	11	24	35	−11	13	Qualification for the relegation round

Source: FFK (in Russian)
Rules for classification: 1st points;
Two team tiebreak: 1st overall wins; 2nd head-to-head record; 3rd goals difference; 4th goals scored; 5th away goals scored;
Multiple teams tiebreak: 1st overall wins; 2nd goals difference; 3rd goals scored; 4th away goals scored

=== Results ===
Home \ Away	AKT	AKZ	AST	ATY	IRT	KRT	ORD	SHA	TAR	TOB	VOS	ZHE
Aktobe		2–0	2–1	3–0	3–0	1–1	1–0	3–1	3–2	1–0	0–1	1–1
Akzhayik	1–1		2–2	4–0	1–2	0–0	1–2	3–0	1–0	1–1	0–0	2–0
Astana	1–2	3–1		1–2	1–1	0–0	0–1	1–0	3–1	2–1	1–0	4–1
Atyrau	0–2	1–0	1–2		0–0	1–1	0–0	1–0	3–1	1–0	2–0	1–1
Irtysh Pavlodar	0–0	3–1	0–1	1–0		2–1	2–0	2–2	1–0	1–0	1–1	0–1
Kairat	1–0	2–1	1–2	0–0	3–2		0–0	1–1	2–1	4–2	2–0	3–3
Ordabasy	0–1	4–2	0–2	3–0	1–3	1–0		0–0	0–0	1–0	4–1	1–2
Shakhter Karagandy	1–2	4–0	1–3	3–2	2–1	2–1	3–0 (Note: 22 July 2013 Shakhter were awarded a 3–0 win due to Ordabasy fielding an ineligible player. The original match had ended in a 3–1 win for Ordabasy.)		3–0	2–0	2–0	1–0
Taraz	0–1	1–1	0–0	4–1	0–1	2–1	0–1	2–1		1–2	1–0	0–0
Tobol	1–0	1–1	5–1	2–1	0–0	2–3	0–0	1–2	2–2		3–0	3–1
Vostok	0–1	1–0	1–3	0–0	1–1	1–1	2–1	0–0	1–0	1–0		1–1
Zhetysu	0–0	5–1	1–1	0–1	1–0	0–0	0–0	0–0	1–1	1–4	0–0	

Source: (in Russian)
Legend: Blue = home team win; Yellow = draw; Red = away team win.

== Championship round ==
=== Table ===
Pos	Team	Pld	W	D	L	GF	GA	GD	Pts	Qualification
1	Aktobe (C)	32	20	6	6	46	22	+24	43	Qualification for the Champions League second qualifying round
2	Astana	32	19	5	8	54	35	+19	42	Qualification for the Europa League first qualifying round
3	Kairat	32	12	12	8	44	38	+6	33	Qualification for the Europa League first qualifying round
4	Irtysh Pavlodar	32	12	8	12	41	39	+2	27	
5	Shakhter Karagandy	32	12	7	13	43	45	−2	26	Qualification for the Europa League first qualifying round (Note: Shakter qualified for the 2014–15 UEFA Europa League first qualifying round by winning the 2013 Kazakhstan Cup.)
6	Ordabasy	32	11	8	13	33	34	−1	23	

Source: Soccerway
Rules for classification: 1st points;
Two team tiebreak: 1st overall wins; 2nd head-to-head record; 3rd goals difference; 4th goals scored; 5th away goals scored;
Multiple teams tiebreak: 1st overall wins; 2nd goals difference; 3rd goals scored; 4th away goals scored.
(C) Champions

=== Results ===
Home \ Away	AKT	AST	IRT	KRT	ORD	SHA
Aktobe		2–0	3–1	2–0	2–2	4–0
Astana	1–0		4–2	1–2	3–1	1–2
Irtysh Pavlodar	4–0	0–1		2–3	3–0	2–1
Kairat	0–1	1–2	3–2		0–0	3–3
Ordabasy	2–1	0–2	3–1	1–2		4–0
Shakhter Karagandy	0–1	1–4	1–1	1–2	3–0	

Source: Soccerway
Legend: Blue = home team win; Yellow = draw; Red = away team win.

== Relegation round ==
=== Table ===
Pos	Team	Pld	W	D	L	GF	GA	GD	Pts	Relegation
7	Tobol	32	14	6	12	48	33	+15	35	
8	Atyrau	32	10	11	11	26	38	−12	28	
9	Zhetysu	32	6	17	9	22	32	−10	22	
10	Taraz	32	7	9	16	30	38	−8	21	
11	Vostok (R)	32	6	13	13	20	37	−17	20	Qualification for the relegation play-off
12	Akzhayik (R)	32	7	10	15	37	50	−13	19	Relegation to the Kazakhstan First Division

Source: Soccerway
Rules for classification: 1st points;
Two team tiebreak: 1st overall wins; 2nd head-to-head record; 3rd goals difference; 4th goals scored; 5th away goals scored;
Multiple teams tiebreak: 1st overall wins; 2nd goals difference; 3rd goals scored; 4th away goals scored
(R) Relegated

=== Results ===
Home \ Away	AKZ	ATY	TAR	TOB	VOS	ZHE
Akzhayik		3–0	2–1	1–3	2–2	0–0
Atyrau	2–2		1–0	0–0	1–0	0–0
Taraz	3–0	1–1		2–0	1–1	0–1
Tobol	2–0	3–1	2–0		2–1	2–0
Vostok	2–0	1–2	1–1	0–4		0–0
Zhetysu	0–3	0–0	0–2	1–0	0–0	

Source: Soccerway
Legend: Blue = home team win; Yellow = draw; Red = away team win.

== Relegation play-off ==
6 November 2013
19:00

Spartak Semey	1–0 (a.e.t.)	FC Vostok
Puryshkin 118'

Spartak Stadium, Semey

== Top goalscorers ==
As of 11 November 2013

Rank	Player	Club	Goals
1	(Belarus) Igor Zenkovich	Shakhter Karagandy (Note: Zenkovich scored 9 for Akzhayik.)	15 (3)
2	(Moldova) Igor Bugaiov	Tobol	13 (2)
3	(The Gambia) Momodou Ceesay	Kairat	12
4	(Croatia) Edin Junuzović	Ordabasy	12 (0)
5	(Croatia) Josip Knežević	Kairat	10 (4)

== Attendances ==
#	Club	Average
1	Aktobe	8,313
2	Kairat	8,238
3	Shakhter	4,381
4	Akzhaiyk	4,356
5	Irtysh	3,988
6	Ordabasy	3,813
7	Tobol	3,688
8	Taraz	3,625
9	Astana	3,325
10	Atyrau	2,888
11	Zhetysu	2,263
12	Vostok	1,300
