= Islambek Kuat =

Kazakhstani footballer

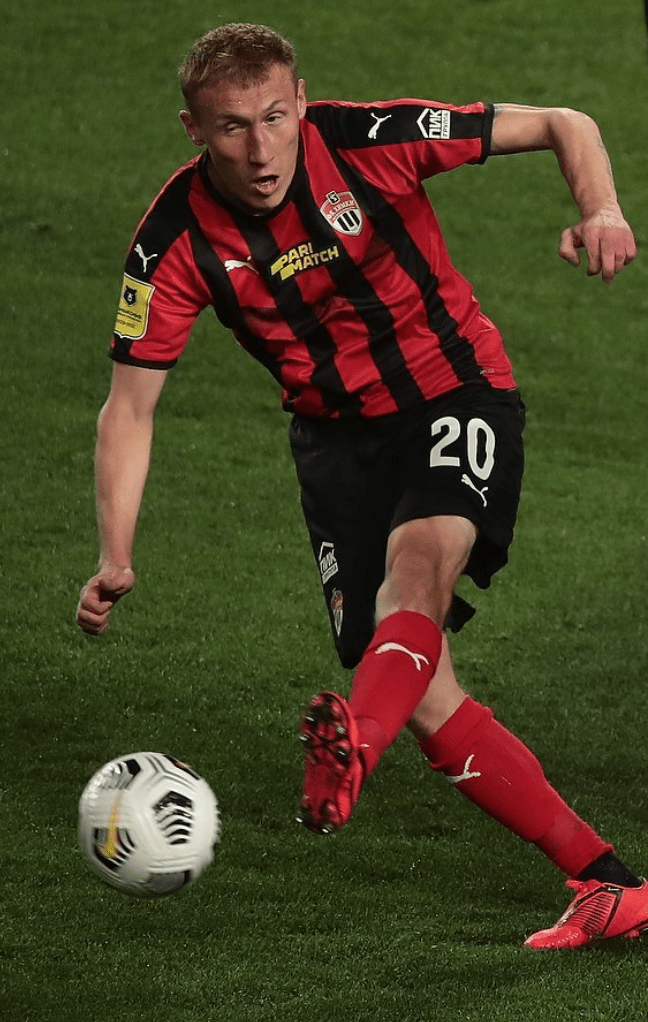
- Kuat with Khimki

Personal information
- Full name: Islambek Yerzhanuly Kuat
- Date of birth: 12 January 1993 (age 33)
- Place of birth: Akmola, Kazakhstan
- Height: 1.79 m (5 ft 10 in)
- Position: Defensive midfielder

Team information
- Current team: Jenis
- Number: 7

Senior career*
Years	Team	Apps	(Gls)
2010–2014	Astana	20	(2)
2011	→ Okzhetpes (loan)	26	(0)
2012	→ Aktobe (loan)	15	(1)
2014–2019	Kairat	133	(7)
2020	Orenburg	3	(0)
2020–2021	Khimki	6	(0)
2021–2024	Astana	71	(2)
2025–	Jenis	44	(3)

International career^{‡}
2015–	Kazakhstan	77	(6)
- * Club domestic league appearances and goals as of 1 November 2026 ‡ National team caps and goals as of 18:50, 13 November 2026 (UTC)

Islambek Yerzhanuly Kuat (Kazakh: Исламбек Ержанұлы Қуат, İslambek Erjanūly Quat; born 12 January 1993) is a Kazakh footballer who plays for Jenis and the Kazakhstan national team for which he is the joint most capped player (Note: along with Serhiy Malyi).

Kuat scored his first goal for Kazakhstan on 10 October 2015 in a 2–1 defeat against the Netherlands in a UEFA Euro 2016 qualifier.

== Career ==
=== Club ===
On 30 December 2019, FC Kairat confirmed Kuat's departure from the club at the end of his contract. On 1 January 2020, Russian Premier League club FC Orenburg announced the signing of Kuat. On 30 July 2020, his Orenburg contract was terminated by mutual consent.

On 11 September 2020 he joined Russian Premier League club FC Khimki. On 13 March 2021, his contract with Khimki was terminated by mutual consent.

On 16 March 2021, FC Astana announced that they had re-signed Kuat after he'd previously played for the club between 2010 and 2014. On 23 December 2024, Astana announced that Kuat would leave the club after his contract had expired.

=== International ===
Kuat became very well known in Turkey, thanks to his goal against Latvia, which enabled the Turkish team to qualify direct as the best third-placed side in the UEFA Euro 2016 qualifying. It was even suggested that a street in Istanbul be named in honour of Kuat, while more than one fan on social media promised to name their children in honour of the midfielder. A dozen Turkish fans presented him with gifts and a bouquet of flowers, and thanked him personally at half-time during Kairat's game against Atyrau on 17 October.

== Career statistics ==
=== Club ===
As of match played 2 July.

Appearances and goals by club, season and competition
Club	Season	League			National Cup		Continental		Other		Total	
Club	Season	Division	Apps	Goals	Apps	Goals	Apps	Goals	Apps	Goals	Apps	Goals
Astana	2010	Kazakhstan Premier League	0	0	0	0	-		-		0	0
Astana	2011	Kazakhstan Premier League	0	0	0	0	-		-		0	0
Astana	2012	Kazakhstan Premier League	0	0	0	0	-		-		0	0
Astana	2013	Kazakhstan Premier League	18	2	2	0	2	0	0	0	22	2
Astana	2014	Kazakhstan Premier League	2	0	1	0	0	0	-		3	0
Astana	Total		20	2	3	0	2	0	0	0	25	2
Okzhetpes (loan)	2011	Kazakhstan First Division	26	0	2	0	–		–		28	0
Aktobe (loan)	2012	Kazakhstan Premier League	15	1	3	0	0	0	–		18	1
Kairat	2014	Kazakhstan Premier League	6	0	1	0	0	0	-		7	0
Kairat	2015	Kazakhstan Premier League	19	1	3	0	7	2	0	0	29	3
Kairat	2016	Kazakhstan Premier League	27	4	4	2	4	0	1	0	36	6
Kairat	2017	Kazakhstan Premier League	30	1	2	0	4	0	1	1	37	2
Kairat	2018	Kazakhstan Premier League	25	1	2	1	5	0	1	0	33	2
Kairat	2019	Kazakhstan Premier League	26	0	1	0	4	1	1	0	32	1
Kairat	Total		133	7	13	3	24	3	4	1	174	14
Orenburg	2019–20	Russian Premier League	3	0	0	0	-		-		3	0
Khimki	2020–21	Russian Premier League	6	0	1	0	-		-		7	0
Astana	2021	Kazakhstan Premier League	23	1	6	1	4	0	0	0	33	2
Astana	2022	Kazakhstan Premier League	11	0	0	0	0	0	-		11	0
Astana	2023	Kazakhstan Premier League	18	0	3	0	8	0	1	0	30	0
Astana	2024	Kazakhstan Premier League	19	1	2	0	7	0	5	0	33	1
Astana	Total		71	2	11	1	19	0	6	0	107	3
Jenis	2025	Kazakhstan Premier League	20	1	4	1	–		–		24	2
Jenis	2026	Kazakhstan Premier League	14	1	2	0	–		–		16	1
Jenis	Total		34	2	6	1	–		–		40	3
Career total			308	2	39	5	45	3	10	1	402	23

=== International ===
As of match played 13 November 2026.

National team	Year	Apps	Goals
Kazakhstan	2015	4	2
Kazakhstan	2016	6	0
Kazakhstan	2017	6	1
Kazakhstan	2018	7	0
Kazakhstan	2019	8	1
Kazakhstan	2020	7	1
Kazakhstan	2021	8	1
Kazakhstan	2022	8	0
Kazakhstan	2023	7	0
Kazakhstan	2024	3	0
Kazakhstan	2025	5	0
Kazakhstan	2026	7	0
Total		77	6

==== International goals ====
Scores and results list Kazakhstan's goal tally first.

No.	Date	Venue	Opponent	Score	Result	Competition	Ref.
1	10 October 2015	Astana Arena, Astana, Kazakhstan	Netherlands	1–2	1–2	UEFA Euro 2016 qualification	
2	13 October 2015	Skonto Stadium, Riga, Latvia	Latvia	1–0	1–0	UEFA Euro 2016 qualification	
3	10 June 2017	Almaty Central Stadium, Almaty, Kazakhstan	Denmark	1–2	1–3	2018 FIFA World Cup qualification	
4	11 June 2019	Astana Arena, Nur-Sultan, Kazakhstan	San Marino	1–0	4–0	UEFA Euro 2020 qualification	
5	4 September 2020	LFF Stadium, Vilnius, Lithuania	Lithuania	2–0	2–0	2020–21 UEFA Nations League C	
6	7 September 2021	Bilino Polje, Zenica, Bosnia and Herzegovina	Bosnia and Herzegovina	1–0	2–2	2022 FIFA World Cup qualification	

== Honours ==
=== Club ===
Kairat

- Kazakhstan Cup (2): 2014, 2015
