= Igor Țîgîrlaș =

Moldovan footballer

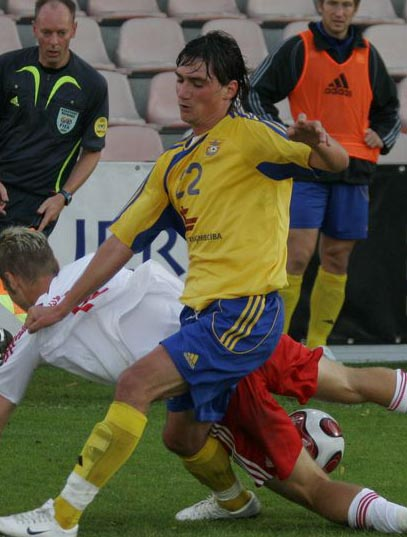
- Tîgîrlaș with Ventspils in 2008

Personal information
- Date of birth: 24 February 1984 (age 42)
- Place of birth: Chișinău, Moldavian SSR, Soviet Union
- Height: 1.79 m (5 ft 10 1/2 in)
- Position: Midfielder

Youth career
- 2000–2002: Sheriff Tiraspol
- 2002–2004: Shakhtar Donetsk

Senior career*
Years	Team	Apps	(Gls)
2002–2004	Shakhtar Donetsk	0	(0)
2002–2004	→ Shakhtar-2 Donetsk	29	(1)
2003–2004	→ Shakhtar-3 Donetsk	2	(3)
2005	Arsenal Kharkiv	13	(4)
2005–2007	Kharkiv	14	(1)
2007	→ Zimbru Chișinău (loan)	15	(1)
2007–2009	Ventspils	60	(15)
2010–2011	Metalurh Zaporizhya	20	(0)
2011	→ Chornomorets Odesa (loan)	13	(7)
2011–2012	Chornomorets Odesa	18	(1)
2012	→ Ventspils (loan)	17	(3)
2012	Gomel	14	(4)
2013	Astana	15	(2)
2014–2015	Elektrotyazhmash Kharkiv	19	(11)
2015–2017	Zaria Bălți	66	(6)
2018	Zimbru Chișinău	23	(0)
2019	Poli Timișoara	15	(1)
2019	Zimbru Chișinău	0	(0)
2020–2022	Bălți	35	(12)
2022–2024	Stăuceni	1	(1)

International career^{‡}
2003–2006	Moldova U21	21	(6)
2007–2017	Moldova	23	(1)
- * Club domestic league appearances and goals as of 31 May 2022 ‡ National team caps and goals as of 11 June 2017

Igor Țîgîrlaș (born 24 February 1984) is a former Moldovan football midfielder. He has also played for the Moldova national football team.

== Career ==
Igor Țîgîrlaș started his football career at the Youth Football School in Chișinău. His first coaches were Nikolay Esin and Anatolii Nesmeyanov. At 16 years old he was invited to the Moldova U-17 team, which participated at "Football Federation of Moldova Cup". Having scored 2 goals and making 2 assists in three matches, and showing excellent performance, after the tournament he was invited by the Moldovan Champions - Sheriff Tiraspol.

Țîgîrlaș played 2 years for Sheriff's second team and in so doing drew the attention of Shakhtar Donetsk. He signed the contract with Ukrainian giant, and at the same time secured himself a starter spot on the Moldova U-21 team, for whom he played more than 20 matches.

In 2005 Țîgîrlaș spent first part of the year in Arsenal Kharkiv and then he was transferred to another Ukrainian team – FC Kharkiv, where, thanks to his universalism (Țîgîrlaș is able to play on the right or left flank, forward or offense), he has been one of important players of the team. After Vladimir Bessonov was named new head coach of FC Kharkiv, the club parted with Țîgîrlaș and most of the other foreign players.

In the Spring of 2007, Igor Țîgîrlaș came to Zimbru Chişinău on loan from FC Kharkiv. He played 10 matches in the Moldovan championship, scored 1 goal and made 9 assists. In the Moldova Cup final, Zimbru won against Nistru, and Țîgîrlaș won the first trophy of his career. Despite playing at Zimbru for only 3 months, at the end of the year, he was included in the symbolic "Zimbru 2006/07 Ideal Team". ».

Igor Țîgîrlaș was to win two more trophies in 2007. In the Summer, the Latvian champions, FK Ventspils, bought his transfer from FC Kharkiv. With FK Ventspils, Țîgîrlaș won both the Latvian championship and the Latvian Cup. He also played in the Baltic League final. He helped FK Ventspils to catch up with then leaders, Liepājas Metalurgs, despite 14 points handicap, and scored a crucial goal in a head-to-head match between the teams.

In 2009, his goal against BATE Borisov helped Ventspils to reach the Play-off Round of the UEFA Champions League and eventually play in UEFA Europa League group stage after losing to FC Zurich, against whom Țîgîrlaș also scored.

In February 2010, he joined Metalurh Zaporizhya in Ukraine. On 26 February 2011, it was announced that Țîgîrlaș joined Chornomorets on a 6-month loan from FC Metalurh Zaporizhya, with the right to purchase at the end of the season. This right was exercised in June, 2011, and Țîgîrlaș joined Chornomorets on a permanent basis.

Before the start of the 2012 season Igor was loaned to the Latvian Higher League club FK Ventspils. In June 2012 his contract with Chornomorets ended.

In February 2013, Țîgîrlaș signed for Kazakhstan Premier League club FC Astana.

== Champions League ==
In the same 2007 year Țîgîrlaș debuted in UEFA Champions League, where he played 4 matches. In the 1st qualifying round FK Ventspils won against Wales champions - TNK, in the 2nd round Latvian team was eliminated by "Red Bull-Salzburg" (Austria). In 2008/2009 season FK Ventspils was close to 3rd qualifying round of Champions League but lost to SK Brann.

== Moldova National team ==
Until 2006 Igor Țîgîrlaș was key player of Moldova U-21 team, for which he played 21 matches. In 2007 Țîgîrlaș was invited for the first time to National team of Moldova.

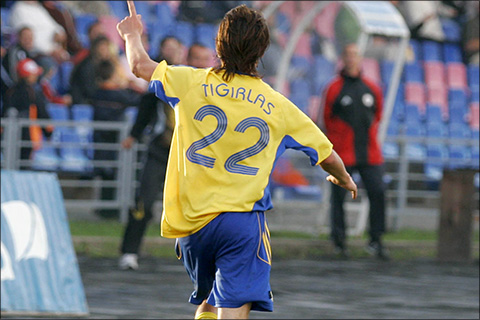
Igor Țîgîrlaș celebrates his goal against Metallurg, which brought title to FK Ventspils

=== International goal ===
Scores and results list Moldova's goal tally first.

No	Date	Venue	Opponent	Score	Result	Competition
1.	29 May 2010	Sportzentrum Anif, Anif, Austria	United Arab Emirates	1–0	2–3	Friendly match

== Achievements ==
- Moldova Cup winner with Zimbru – 2007.
- Latvia Champion with FK Ventspils – 2007
- Latvia Cup winner with FK Ventspils – 2007.
