= Denis Tolebaev =

Kazakhstani footballer (born 1987)

Personal information
- Full name: Denis Timurovych Tolebaev
- Date of birth: 7 February 1987 (age 39)
- Place of birth: Almaty, Kazakhstan
- Height: 2.05 m (6 ft 9 in)
- Position: Goalkeeper

Senior career*
Years	Team	Apps	(Gls)
2007–2008	Kazakhmys	5	(0)
2008	Kairat	14	(0)
2008–2009	Megasport	6	(0)
2009–2010	Astana	0	(0)
2010–2011	Kazakhmys	30	(0)
2011–2012	Vostok	22	(0)
2012–2014	Astana	0	(0)
2015–2016	Irtysh	0	(0)
2017–2018	Akzhayik	28	(0)
2018–2019	Kyran	6	(0)
2019–	Sokil	74	(0)
- * Club domestic league appearances and goals

Denis Timurovych Tolebaev (Russian: Денис Толебаев; born 7 February 1987) is a Kazakhstani footballer who plays as a goalkeeper for Sokil.

== Early life ==
Tolebaev was born in 1987 in Almaty, Kazakhstan, and graduated from Abai Kazakh National Pedagogical University in 2009.

== Club career ==
Tolebaev started his career with Kazakhstani side Kazakhmys. In 2008, he signed for Kazakhstani side Kairat. On 16 March 2008, he debuted for the club during a 0–0 draw with Shakhter. He was described as "impenetrable" while playing for the club. After that, he signed for Kazakhstani side Megasport. In 2009, he signed for Kazakhstani side Astana. In 2010, he returned to Kazakhstani side Kazakhmys. In 2011, he signed for Kazakhstani side Vostok. In 2012, he returned to Kazakhstani side Astana. He was part of the squad that won the league. In 2015, he signed for Kazakhstani side Irtysh. In 2017, he signed for Kazakhstani side Akzhayik. In 2018, he signed for Kazakhstani side Kyran. In 2019, he signed for Kazakhstani side Sokil.

== International career ==
Tolebaev was described as once "considered... as a candidate for the Kazakhstan national team".

== Style of play ==
Tolebaev operates as a goalkeeper. He is known for his height.
