= Kirill Pasichnik =

Kazakhstani footballer

Personal information
- Full name: Kirill Nikolaevich Pasichnik
- Date of birth: 24 May 1994 (age 32)
- Place of birth: Tutaev Yaroslavl region, Russia
- Height: 1.90 m (6 ft 3 in)
- Position: Centre-back

Team information
- Current team: Podillya Khmelnytskyi
- Number: 13

Senior career*
Years	Team	Apps	(Gls)
2012–2013	FC Astana	6	(0)
2013–2014	Atyrau	1	(0)
2015–2016	Okzhetpes	11	(0)
2017	Buxoro	17	(1)
2018–2019	Shakhter Karagandy	20	(1)
2019	FC Kyran	6	(0)
2019–2020	Uzhhorod	16	(2)
2022	Skoruk Tomakivka	9	(0)
2023	Poltava	7	(0)
2023	Bukovyna Chernivtsi	14	(1)
2024–	Podillya Khmelnytskyi	19	(0)

International career^{‡}
2013–2014	Kazakhstan U21	15	(2)
- * Club domestic league appearances and goals as of 1 January 2025 ‡ National team caps and goals as of 16 January 2018

Kirill Nikolaevich Pasichnik (Russian: Кирил Николаевич Пасичник; born 24 May 1994) is a Kazakh footballer who plays as a centre-back for Podillya Khmelnytskyi.

== Career ==
In 2017, Pasichnik played for Buxoro in Uzbekistan.
