= Foxi Kéthévoama =

Central African Republic footballer

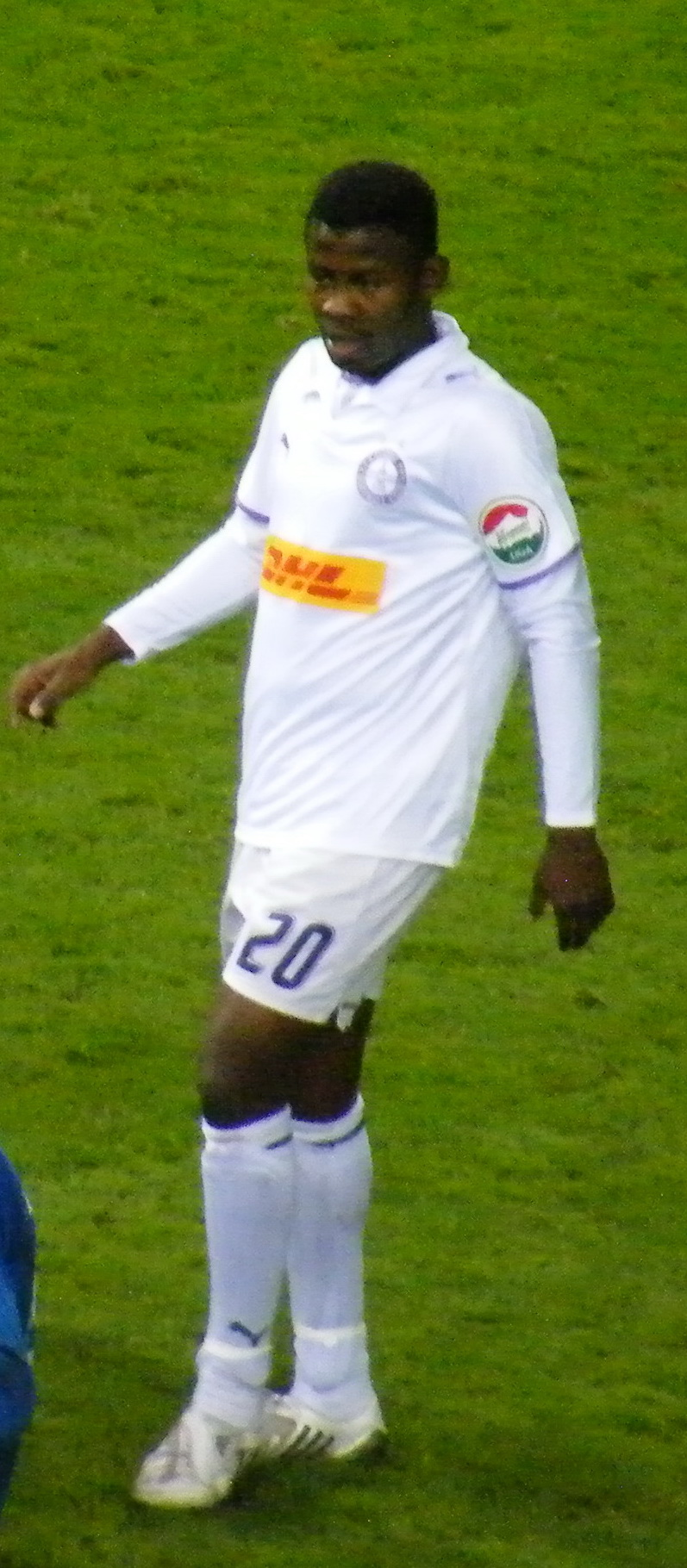

Personal information
- Date of birth: 30 May 1986 (age 40)
- Place of birth: Bangui, Central African Republic
- Height: 1.73 m (5 ft 8 in)
- Position: Midfielder

Youth career
- USCA

Senior career*
Years	Team	Apps	(Gls)
2006–2007	Diósgyőr	23	(8)
2007–2010	Újpest	73	(13)
2010–2012	Kecskemét	42	(11)
2012	→ Astana (loan)	23	(1)
2013–2015	Astana	86	(25)
2016	Gaziantep B.B.	10	(5)
2016–2022	Balıkesirspor	148	(21)
Total		405	(84)

International career^{‡}
2002–2021	Central African Republic	48	(8)
- * Club domestic league appearances and goals as of 20 May 2022 ‡ National team caps and goals as of 13 October 2021

Foxi Kéthévoama (born 30 May 1986) is a Central African professional footballer.

== Career ==
Born in Bangui, Kéthévoama began playing club football with local side DFC 8ème Arrondissement before moving abroad to play professionally. In May 2011, he played in the Hungarian Cup final, where he became a Hat-trick hero and won the trophy. In February 2012, Kéthévoama joined Astana on loan from Kecskeméti TE on a year-long loan deal, making the move permanent the following January.

He scored his first international goals in the Central African Republic's 2–0 victory over Botswana on 2 June 2012, the nation's first ever win in FIFA World Cup qualifying.

On 26 July 2016, Kéthévoama signed a two-year contract with Balıkesirspor.

== Career statistics ==
=== Club ===
As of match played 3 March 2018

Appearances and goals by club, season and competition
Club	Season	League			National Cup		League Cup		Continental		Other		Total	
Club	Season	Division	Apps	Goals	Apps	Goals	Apps	Goals	Apps	Goals	Apps	Goals	Apps	Goals
Kecskeméti	2010–11	Nemzeti Bajnokság I	26	6	6	6	5	0	-		-		37	12
Kecskeméti	2011–12	Nemzeti Bajnokság I	16	5	3	1	1	0	2	0	1	0	23	6
Kecskeméti	Total		42	11	9	7	6	0	2	0	1	0	60	18
Astana (loan)	2012	Kazakhstan Premier League	23	1	6	2	-		-		-		29	3
Astana	2013	Kazakhstan Premier League	30	5	1	1	-		2	0	1	1	34	7
Astana	2014	Kazakhstan Premier League	25	16	2	2	-		8	2	-		35	20
Astana	2015	Kazakhstan Premier League	31	4	4	0	-		12	0	1	0	48	4
Astana	Total		86	25	7	3	-	-	22	2	2	1	117	31
Gaziantep B.B.	2015–16	TFF First League	10	5	0	0	-		-		-		10	5
Balıkesirspor	2016–17	TFF First League	28	6	2	1	-		-		-		30	7
Balıkesirspor	2017–18	TFF First League	18	1	0	0	-		-		-		18	1
Balıkesirspor	Total		46	7	2	1	-	-	-	-	-	-	48	8
Career total			207	49	24	13	6	0	24	2	3	1	264	65

=== International ===
Central African Republic
Year	Apps	Goals
2002	1	0
2003	0	0
2004	0	0
2005	1	0
2006	0	0
2007	0	0
2008	0	0
2009	0	0
2010	2	0
2011	4	0
2012	6	3
2013	4	0
2014	3	0
2015	4	0
2016	4	1
2017	3	0
2018	7	3
2019	5	1
Total	44	8

Statistics accurate as of match played 2 December 2019

=== International goals ===
Scores and results list Central African Republic's goal tally first.

#	Date	Venue	Opponent	Score	Result	Competition
1.	2 June 2012	Barthélemy Boganda Stadium, Bangui, Central African Republic	Botswana	1–0	2–0	2014 FIFA World Cup qualification
2.	2 June 2012	Barthélemy Boganda Stadium, Bangui, Central African Republic	Botswana	2–0	2–0	2014 FIFA World Cup qualification
3.	30 June 2012	Barthélemy Boganda Stadium, Bangui, Central African Republic	Egypt	1–0	1–1	2013 Africa Cup of Nations qualification
4.	4 September 2016	Stade des Martyrs, Kinshasa, DR Congo	DR Congo	1–2	1–4	2017 Africa Cup of Nations qualification
5.	23 March 2018	Independence Stadium, Bakau, Gambia	Gambia	1–1	1–1	Friendly
6.	27 March 2018	Stade de Marrakech, Marrakesh, Morocco	Kenya	1–0	3–2	Friendly
7.	27 May 2018	Stade Général Seyni Kountché, Niamey, Niger	Niger	2–1	3–3	Friendly
8.	13 October 2019	Stade Général Seyni Kountché, Niamey, Niger	Niger	2–0	2–0	Friendly
