= Nikolai Nesterenko =

Russian footballer

Personal information
- Full name: Nikolai Vladimirovich Nesterenko
- Date of birth: 17 December 1984 (age 41)
- Place of birth: Elista, Kalmyk ASSR, Soviet Union
- Height: 1.78 m (5 ft 10 in)
- Positions: Midfielder; defender

Senior career*
Years	Team	Apps	(Gls)
2002–2003	Uralan Elista	0	(0)
2004	Tekstilshchik Kamyshin	29	(1)
2005–2007	Irtysh	77	(2)
2008–2013	Volgar-Gazprom	153	(15)
2013	Taraz	26	(0)
2015	FC Khimik Dzerzhinsk	7	(0)
- * Club domestic league appearances and goals

Nikolai Vladimirovich Nesterenko (Russian: Николай Владимирович Нестеренко; born 17 December 1984) is a former Russian professional footballer.

== Club career ==
He played 5 seasons in the Russian Football National League for FC Volgar Astrakhan and FC Khimik Dzerzhinsk.

== Personal life ==
His younger brother Andrei Nesterenko also was a footballer.
