= Kayrat Nurdauletov =

Kazakhstani footballer

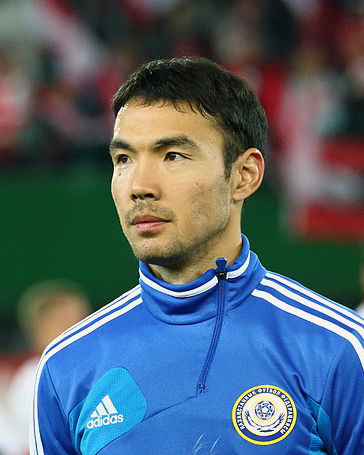
- Nurdauletov with Kazakhstan in 2012

Personal information
- Full name: Kayrat Zhumabekuly Nurdauletov
- Date of birth: 6 November 1982 (age 43)
- Place of birth: Alma-Ata, Kazakh SSR, Soviet Union
- Height: 1.84 m (6 ft 0 in)
- Positions: Centre back; defensive midfielder

Senior career*
Years	Team	Apps	(Gls)
1999–2000	CSKA Almaty	20	(0)
2001	Kyzylzhar	25	(4)
2002–2004	Irtysh	86	(6)
2005–2006	Kairat	44	(2)
2007–2009	Tobol	64	(2)
2010	Kairat	10	(1)
2010–2014	Astana	110	(7)
2015	Kaisar	17	(0)
2016	Akzhayik	1	(0)

International career
2003–2013	Kazakhstan	35	(4)

Managerial career
- 2017–2018: Kazakhstan (assistant)
- 2019: Kazakhstan U21 (assistant)
- 2020–2023: Kazakhstan U21
- 2022–2023: Astana (assistant)
- 2023: Maktaaral
- 2023–2024: Zhetysu
- 2025: Irtysh Pavlodar
- 2025-: FC Okzhetpes
- * Club domestic league appearances and goals

Kayrat Zhumabekuly Nurdauletov (Kazakh: Қайрат Жұмабекұлы Нұрдәулетов; 6 November 1982) is a Kazakhstani football manager and a former player.

== Coaching career ==
In January 2022, Nurdauletov was appointed as an assistant manager to Srdjan Blagojevic at Astana.

== Career statistics ==
=== International ===
Kazakhstan national team
Year	Apps	Goals
2003	2	0
2004	2	0
2005	0	0
2006	0	0
2007	5	1
2008	4	0
2009	0	0
2010	0	0
2011	8	1
2012	7	2
2013	7	0
Total	35	4

Statistics accurate as of match played 10 September 2013

=== International goals ===
#	Date	Venue	Opponent	Score	Result	Competition
1.	8 September 2007	Central Stadium, Almaty, Kazakhstan	Tajikistan	1–1	Draw	Friendly
2.	7 October 2011	King Baudouin Stadium, Brussels, Belgium	Belgium	4–1	Lost	UEFA Euro 2012 qual.
3.	1 June 2012	Central Stadium, Almaty, Kazakhstan	Kyrgyzstan	5–2	Win	Friendly
4.	7 September 2012	Astana Arena, Astana, Kazakhstan	Republic of Ireland	1–2	Loss	2014 World Cup qual.
Correct as of 22 May 2016

== Honours ==
=== Club ===
Irtysh Pavlodar

- Kazakhstan Premier League (2): 2002, 2003

Tobol

- Kazakhstan Cup (1): 2007

Astana

- Kazakhstan Premier League (1): 2014
- Kazakhstan Cup (2): 2010, 2012
