= Cícero Semedo =

Guinea-Bissauan footballer (born 1986)

Cícero
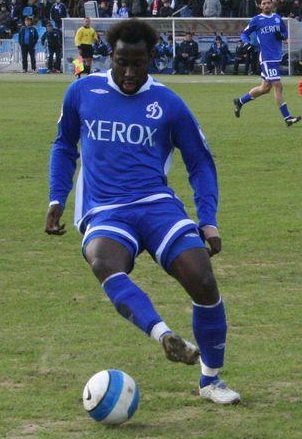
- Cícero in action for Dynamo Moscow in 2007

Personal information
- Full name: Cícero Casimiro Sanches Semedo
- Date of birth: 8 May 1986 (age 40)
- Place of birth: Seia, Portugal
- Height: 1.89 m (6 ft 2 in)
- Position: Forward

Youth career
- 2000–2001: Desportivo Seia
- 2001–2002: Bairro da Misericórdia
- 2002–2004: Braga

Senior career*
Years	Team	Apps	(Gls)
2003–2004	Braga B	15	(5)
2004	Braga	8	(1)
2005–2008	Dynamo Moscow	39	(4)
2009–2010	Vitória Guimarães	4	(0)
2009–2010	→ Oliveirense (loan)	27	(8)
2010–2011	Rio Ave	13	(0)
2011–2015	Paços Ferreira	54	(12)
2012	→ Moreirense (loan)	8	(4)
2013–2014	→ Astana (loan)	20	(7)
2015–2016	Şanlıurfaspor	10	(0)
2016–2017	Paços Ferreira	28	(1)
2017–2018	Arouca	8	(0)
2019	Trofense	11	(2)
2019–2020	Beira-Mar	22	(9)
2020–2021	Anadia	28	(4)
2021–2023	Salgueiros	55	(23)
2023–2024	Beira-Mar	25	(6)
2024–2025	Florgrade	19	(4)

International career
2007	Portugal U21	4	(0)
2010–2016	Guinea-Bissau	14	(6)
- * Club domestic league appearances and goals as of 23:04, 4 March 2025 (UTC)

Cícero Casimiro Sanches Semedo (born 8 May 1986), known simply as Cícero, is a professional footballer who plays as a forward. Born in Portugal, he represented Guinea-Bissau at senior level.

== Club career ==
A product of Braga's youth system, Cícero was in born in Seia, Guarda District. He was promoted to the first team for the 2004–05 campaign, making his official debut with the main squad in a 2–2 away draw against Académica de Coimbra on 30 August 2004. On 21 November, as a second-half substitute, he scored his first Primeira Liga goal, in a 2–0 home win over Estoril.

In January 2005, Cícero moved to Russia for Dynamo Moscow as many Portuguese players – or playing in the league – during that period, agreeing to a four-year contract for a €2.5 million fee. He returned to Portugal in the 2009 January transfer window, joining Braga rivals Vitória de Guimarães. In the summer, he signed with Segunda Liga club Oliveirense in a season-long loan.

Cícero joined Astana of the Kazakhstan Premier League on 25 June 2013, on a one-year loan. He subsequently returned to Paços de Ferreira.

In the following years, Cícero represented in quick succession Şanlıurfaspor (Turkish TFF First League), Paços de Ferreira, Arouca, Trofense, Beira-Mar (two spells), Anadia and Salgueiros (the last four clubs in the lower leagues of Portugal).

== International career ==
Cícero represented Portugal at youth level. He earned his first senior cap for Guinea-Bissau on 9 October 2010, playing the full 90 minutes in a 1–0 away loss against Angola for the 2012 Africa Cup of Nations qualifiers.

=== International goals ===
Scores and results list Guinea-Bissau's goal tally first, score column indicates score after each Cícero goal.

No	Date	Venue	Opponent	Score	Result	Competition
1.	9 February 2011	Estádio do Restelo, Lisbon, Portugal	Gambia	1–1	3–1	Friendly
2.	9 February 2011	Estádio do Restelo, Lisbon, Portugal	Gambia	2–1	3–1	Friendly
3.	9 February 2011	Estádio do Restelo, Lisbon, Portugal	Gambia	3–1	3–1	Friendly
4.	31 May 2014	Estádio 24 de Setembro, Bissau, Guinea-Bissau	Central African Republic	1–0	3–1	2015 Africa Cup of Nations qualification
5.	31 May 2014	Estádio 24 de Setembro, Bissau, Guinea-Bissau	Central African Republic	3–0	3–1	2015 Africa Cup of Nations qualification
6.	27 March 2016	Nyayo National Stadium, Nairobi, Kenya	Kenya	1–0	1–0	2017 Africa Cup of Nations qualification
