= Blažo Igumanović =

Montenegrin footballer

Personal information
- Full name: Blažo Igumanović
- Date of birth: 19 January 1986 (age 40)
- Place of birth: Titograd, SFR Yugoslavia
- Height: 1.77 m (5 ft 9 1/2 in)
- Position: Left back

Team information
- Current team: Kuwait SC (assistant)

Senior career*
Years	Team	Apps	(Gls)
2002–2003	Mladost Podgorica	10	(0)
2004–2009	Zeta	81	(0)
2010–2013	Rudar Pljevlja	115	(9)
2013	Astana	9	(0)
2014	Rudar Pljevlja	13	(2)
2014–2015	Sutjeska Nikšić	21	(2)
2015–2016	Zawisza Bydgoszcz	22	(0)
2016	Mladost Podgorica	15	(0)
2017	Montana	10	(0)
2017–2018	Budućnost Podgorica	32	(1)
2018–2019	Lovćen	24	(1)
2020	Liria Prizren		

International career
2007	Montenegro U21	6	(0)
2012–2014	Montenegro	2	(0)
- * Club domestic league appearances and goals

Blažo Igumanović (born 19 January 1986) is a Montenegrin former professional footballer who played as a left-back. He is currently the assistant manager of Kuwait SC.

== Club career ==
In July 2013, Igumanović moved to Kazakhstan Premier League side FC Astana.

On 22 December 2016, Igumanović signed a 6-month contract with Bulgarian First League club Montana, with an option for another year. He left the club in June 2017 as the extension clause was not activated following the relegation to Second League.

On 1 August 2017, Igumanović signed with Budućnost Podgorica.

At the end of January 2020, Igumanović joined Liria Prizren in Kosovo.

== International career ==
Igumanović made his debut for Montenegro in a November 2012 FIFA World Cup qualification match against San Marino and has earned a total of 2 caps, scoring no goals. His second and final international was a March 2014 friendly match against Ghana.

== Honours ==
Zeta

- Montenegrin First League: 2006–07

Rudar Pljevlja

- Montenegrin First League: 2009–10
- Montenegrin Cup: 2009–10, 2010–11
