= 2018 FC Kairat season =

FC Kairat
2018 season
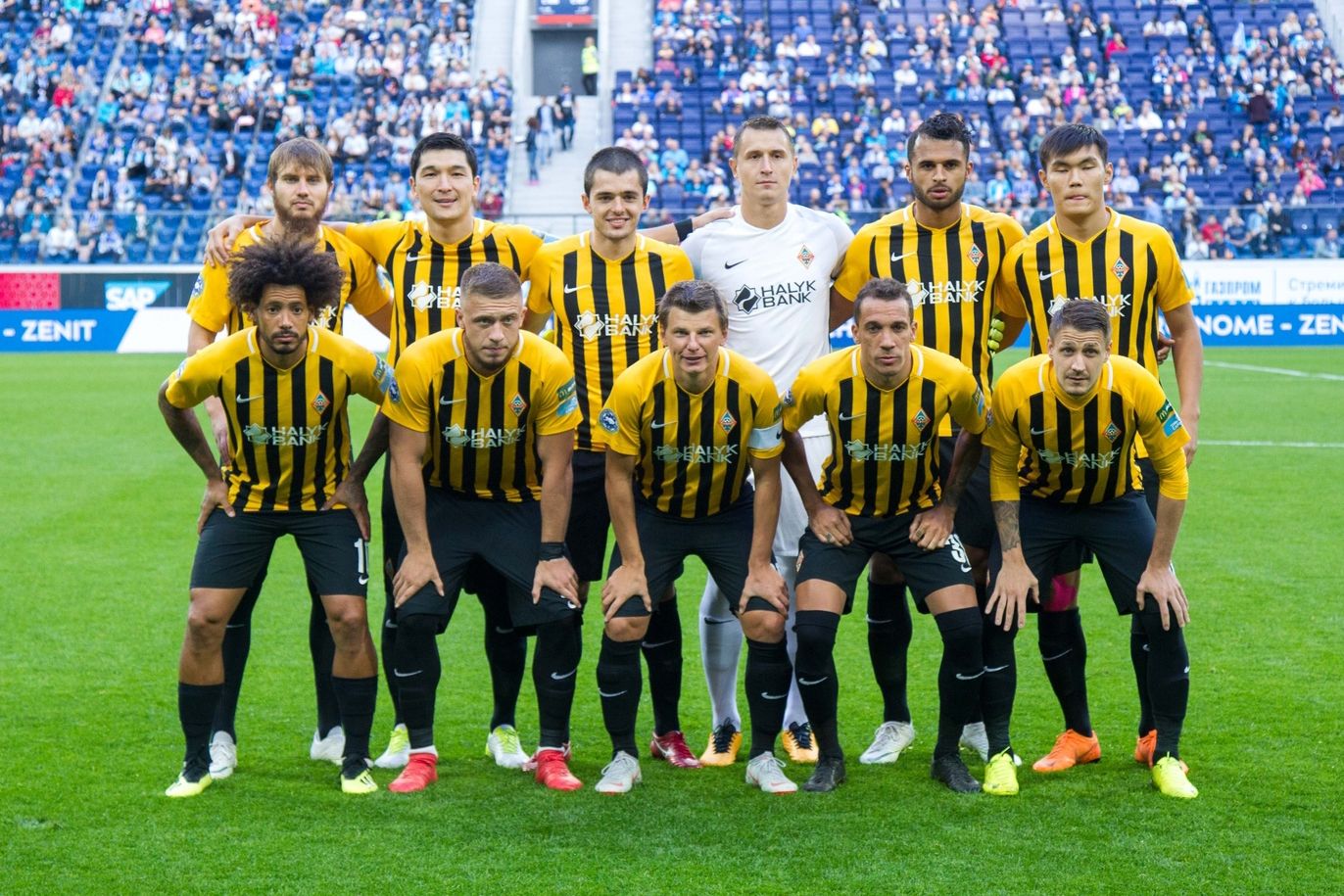
- Chairman: Kairat Boranbayev
- Manager: Carlos Alós (until 15 October); Andrei Karpovich (Caretaker) (from 15 October)
- Stadium: Central Stadium
- Premier League: 2nd
- Kazakhstan Cup: Winners
- Super Cup: Runners-up
- Europa League: Third qualifying round vs Sigma Olomouc
- Top goalscorer: League: Isael (13); All: Isael (13)
Home colours	Away colours	Third colours

The 2018 FC Kairat season was the eighth successive season in which the club played in the Kazakhstan Premier League, the highest tier of association football in Kazakhstan, since their promotion back to the top flight in 2009. Kairat participated in the Kazakhstan Super Cup and the Europa League as well as the Kazakhstan Cup and Premier League.

== Season events ==
On 15 October 2018, Carlos Alós left Kairat by mutual consent, with Andrei Karpovich being appointed as manager.

== Squad ==
As of match played 24 November 2018

No.	Name	Nationality	Position	Date of birth (age)	Signed from	Signed in	Apps.	Goals
Goalkeepers
1	Vladimir Plotnikov	(Kazakhstan)	GK	3 April 1986 (aged 32)	Zhetysu	2015	108	0
24	David Loria	(Kazakhstan)	GK	31 October 1981 (aged 37)		2018	17	0
27	Stas Pokatilov	(Kazakhstan)	GK	8 December 1992 (aged 25)	Rostov	2017	62	0
30	Oleg Grubov	(Kazakhstan)	GK	4 March 1997 (aged 21)	Academy	2015	1	0
51	Vladimir Groshev	(Kazakhstan)	GK	4 January 1995 (aged 23)	Academy	2012	1	0
Defenders
2	Yeldos Akhmetov	(Kazakhstan)	DF	1 June 1990 (aged 28)	Irtysh Pavlodar	2017	43	1
4	Sheldon Bateau	(Trinidad and Tobago)	DF	29 January 1991 (aged 27)	loan from Krylia Sovetov	2017	48	0
5	Gafurzhan Suyumbayev	(Kazakhstan)	DF	19 August 1990 (aged 28)	Ordabasy	2016	94	6
14	Aybol Abiken	(Kazakhstan)	DF	1 June 1996 (aged 22)	Academy	2015	21	1
17	Stanislav Lunin	(Kazakhstan)	DF	2 May 1993 (aged 25)	Shakhter Karagandy	2014	93	3
26	Syarhey Palitsevich	(Belarus)	DF	9 April 1990 (aged 28)	Gençlerbirliği	2018	11	0
32	Alibek Kassym	(Kazakhstan)	DF	27 May 1998 (aged 20)	Academy	2015	1	0
51	Sergey Keyler	(Kazakhstan)	DF	11 August 1994 (aged 24)	Okzhetpes	2018	7	0
Midfielders
3	Yan Vorogovskiy	(Kazakhstan)	MF	7 August 1996 (aged 22)	Kaisar	2016	55	3
6	Nuraly Alip	(Kazakhstan)	MF	22 December 1999 (aged 18)	Academy	2018	21	0
7	Islambek Kuat	(Kazakhstan)	MF	12 January 1993 (aged 25)	Astana	2014	142	13
8	Georgy Zhukov	(Kazakhstan)	MF	19 November 1994 (aged 24)	Ural Yekaterinburg	2017	58	4
9	Bauyrzhan Islamkhan	(Kazakhstan)	MF	23 February 1993 (aged 25)	Kuban Krasnodar	2014	195	56
10	Isael	(Brazil)	MF	13 May 1988 (aged 30)	Krasnodar	2014	171	42
15	Aleksandr Sokolenko	(Kazakhstan)	MF	23 November 1996 (aged 22)	Academy	2017	29	2
20	Ivo Iličević	(Croatia)	MF	14 November 1986 (aged 32)	Anzhi Makhachkala	2017	41	12
25	Ákos Elek	(Hungary)	MF	21 July 1988 (aged 30)	Diósgyőri	2017	63	0
28	Andrey Arshavin	(Russia)	MF	29 May 1981 (aged 37)	Kuban Krasnodar	2016	108	30
30	Juan Felipe	(Brazil)	MF	5 December 1987 (aged 30)	Vardar	2018	30	0
37	Rashid Lyukhay	(Kazakhstan)	MF	30 July 1997 (aged 21)	Academy	2017	1	0
38	Ramazan Orazov	(Kazakhstan)	MF	30 January 1998 (aged 20)	Academy	2017	5	0
	Nurlan Dairov	(Kazakhstan)	MF	26 June 1995 (aged 23)	Academy	2012	3	0
	Maksim Kotov	(Kazakhstan)	MF	9 February 1997 (aged 21)	Academy	2018	1	0
Forwards
18	Aderinsola Eseola	(Ukraine)	FW	28 June 1991 (aged 27)	Zirka Kropyvnytskyi	2018	22	12
19	Márton Eppel	(Hungary)	FW	26 October 1991 (aged 27)	Budapest Honvéd	2018	19	9
22	Magomed Paragulgov	(Kazakhstan)	FW	26 March 1994 (aged 24)	Academy	2012	33	5
23	Vyacheslav Shvyrev	(Kazakhstan)	FW	7 January 2001 (aged 17)	Academy	2018	16	1
29	Samat Sarsenov	(Kazakhstan)	FW	19 August 1996 (aged 22)	Orenburg	2017	8	0
55	Artur Shushenachev	(Kazakhstan)	FW	7 April 1998 (aged 20)	Academy	2017	4	0
	Pavel Kriventsev	(Kazakhstan)	FW	16 January 1996 (aged 22)	Academy	2018	1	0
Players away on loan
13	Yermek Kuantayev	(Kazakhstan)	DF	13 October 1990 (aged 28)	Tobol	2014	96	6
16	Oybek Baltabaev	(Kazakhstan)	MF	13 June 1994 (aged 24)	Academy	2014	11	0
	Rifat Nurmugamet	(Kazakhstan)	FW	22 May 1996 (aged 22)	Academy	2013	5	0
Players that left during the season
11	Hugo Silveira	(Uruguay)	FW	23 May 1993 (aged 25)	loan from Nacional	2018	16	4
19	Gai Assulin	(Israel)	MF	9 April 1991 (aged 27)	Sabadell	2018	2	0
21	Chuma Anene	(Norway)	FW	14 May 1993 (aged 25)	Amkar Perm	2017	38	8
26	Cédric Gogoua	(Ivory Coast)	DF	10 July 1994 (aged 24)	Riga	2017	1	0
49	Akmal Bakhtiyarov	(Kazakhstan)	MF	2 June 1998 (aged 20)	Academy	2017	4	1

=== Out on loan ===
Note: Flags indicate national team as defined under FIFA eligibility rules; some limited exceptions apply. Players may hold more than one non-FIFA nationality.

No.	Pos.	Nation	Player
13	DF	KAZ	Yermek Kuantayev (at Zhetysu)
16	MF	KAZ	Oybek Baltabaev (at Altai Semey)

No.	Pos.	Nation	Player
—	FW	KAZ	Rifat Nurmugamet (at Zhetysu)

== Transfers ==
=== In ===
Date	Position	Nationality	Name	From	Fee	Ref.
13 November 2017	DF	(Ivory Coast)	Cédric Gogoua	Kairat-A	Promoted	
13 February 2018	MF	(Israel)	Gai Assulin	Sabadell	Free	
29 March 2018	MF	(Brazil)	Juan Felipe	Vardar	Undisclosed	
6 June 2018	FW	(Ukraine)	Aderinsola Eseola	Zirka Kropyvnytskyi	Undisclosed	
2 July 2018	FW	(Hungary)	Márton Eppel	Budapest Honvéd	Undisclosed	
10 July 2018	DF	(Belarus)	Syarhey Palitsevich	Gençlerbirliği	Undisclosed	
24 August 2018	GK	(Kazakhstan)	David Loria		Free	

=== Out ===
Date	Position	Nationality	Name	To	Fee	Ref.
11 January 2018	MF	(Kazakhstan)	Bauyrzhan Turysbek	Tobol	Undisclosed	
	FW	(Ivory Coast)	Mohamed Konaté	Gomel	Undisclosed	

=== Loans in ===
Date from	Position	Nationality	Name	From	Date to	Ref.
29 December 2017	DF	(Trinidad and Tobago)	Sheldon Bateau	Krylia Sovetov	End of Season	
13 February 2018	FW	(Uruguay)	Hugo Silveira	Nacional	4 July 2018	

=== Loans out ===
Date from	Position	Nationality	Name	To	Date to	Ref.
	MF	(Kazakhstan)	Oybek Baltabaev	Altai Semey	End of season	
16 February 2018	DF	(Kazakhstan)	Yermek Kuantayev	Zhetysu	End of season	
16 February 2018	FW	(Kazakhstan)	Rifat Nurmugamet	Zhetysu	End of season	

=== Released ===
Date	Position	Nationality	Name	Joined	Date	Ref.
30 March 2018	MF	(Israel)	Gai Assulin	Politehnica Iași	26 September 2019	
4 July 2018	FW	(Norway)	Chuma Anene	Fredericia	4 September 2018	
	DF	(Ivory Coast)	Cédric Gogoua	SKA-Khabarovsk	24 August 2018	
	MF	(Kazakhstan)	Akmal Bakhtiyarov	Artsakh		
30 November 2018	MF	(Brazil)	Isael	Ferencvárosi	1 February 2019	
30 November 2018	GK	(Kazakhstan)	David Loria	Okzhetpes		
30 November 2018	MF	(Brazil)	Juan Felipe	Vardar		
30 November 2018	MF	(Croatia)	Ivo Iličević	1. FC Nürnberg	30 January 2019	
30 November 2018	MF	(Hungary)	Ákos Elek	MOL Vidi	8 January 2019	
30 November 2018	MF	(Russia)	Andrey Arshavin	Retired	3 December 2018	
29 December 2018	DF	(Kazakhstan)	Stanislav Lunin	Irtysh Pavlodar	29 December 2018	
31 December 2018	GK	(Kazakhstan)	Oleg Grubov			
31 December 2018	GK	(Kazakhstan)	Vladimir Groshev			
31 December 2018	DF	(Kazakhstan)	Alibek Kassym			
31 December 2018	DF	(Kazakhstan)	Yermek Kuantayev	Zhetysu		
31 December 2018	MF	(Kazakhstan)	Oybek Baltabaev			
31 December 2018	MF	(Kazakhstan)	Rashid Lyukhay			
31 December 2018	MF	(Kazakhstan)	Maksim Kotov			
31 December 2018	MF	(Kazakhstan)	Rashid Lyukhay			
31 December 2018	FW	(Kazakhstan)	Pavel Kriventsev			

=== Trial ===
Date From	Date To	Position	Nationality	Name	Last club	Ref.
1 February 2018		DF	(Ghana)	Gideon Baah	New York Red Bulls	

== Friendlies ==
29 January 2018	Kairat (Kazakhstan)	3 – 2	(Bulgaria) Ludogorets Razgrad	Turkey
15:00 (UTC+6)	Isael 14'; Islamkhan 70' (pen.); Sarsenov 88'	Report	Vura 6', 10'

1 February 2018	Kairat (Kazakhstan)	3 – 3	(Russia) Dynamo St.Petersburg	Turkey
20:30 (UTC+6)	Anene 39'; Kuat 53'; Arshavin 74'	Report	Barsov 14', 45'; Dvornikov 73'

4 February 2018	Kairat (Kazakhstan)	0 – 1	(Serbia) Voždovac	Turkey
20:00 (UTC+6)		Report	Luković 33'

14 February 2018	Kairat (Kazakhstan)	0 – 3	(Hungary) MTK Budapest	Belek, Turkey
(UTC+6)		Report	Lencse 31'; Torghelle 88'; Korozmán 90'

18 February 2018	Kairat (Kazakhstan)	1 – 0	(Georgia (country)) Torpedo Kutaisi	Belek, Turkey
(UTC+6)		Report	Bateau 88'

9 September 2018	Zenit St.Petersburg (Russia)	1 – 0	(Kazakhstan) Kairat	Saint Petersburg, Russia
21:00 (UTC+6)	Driussi 32'	Report		Stadium: Krestovsky Stadium; Attendance: 40,122

== Competitions ==
=== Super Cup ===
4 March 2018	Astana	3 – 0	Kairat	Astana
15:00 (UTC+6)	Muzhikov (yellow card) 55'; Mayewski 59'; Tomasov 62', 67'	Report	Gogoua (yellow card) 58'	Stadium: Astana Arena; Attendance: 12,500; Referee: Artyom Kuchin

=== Premier League ===
==== Results summary ====
Overall								Home						Away					
Pld	W	D	L	GF	GA	GD	Pts	W	D	L	GF	GA	GD	W	D	L	GF	GA	GD
33	19	5	9	60	33	+27	62	12	2	3	36	12	+24	7	3	6	24	21	+3

Last updated: 11 November 2018.
Source: See Results

==== Results by round ====
Round	1	2	3	4	5	6	7	8	9	10	11	12	13	14	15	16	17	18	19	20	21	22	23	24	25	26	27	28	29	30	31	32	33
Ground	H	H	A	H	A	H	A	A	H	A	H	A	H	A	H	A	H	H	A	H	A	A	H	H	A	A	H	A	H	H	A	A	H
Result	W	W	D	W	D	W	W	W	W	L	W	W	W	W	L	W	W	W	L	W	D	W	W	L	L	W	W	L	D	L	L	L	D
Position	3	2	3	3	4	2	2	2	2	2	2	2	2	2	2	2	2	2	2	2	2	2	2	2	2	2	2	2	2	2	2	2	2

Source: See Results
A = Away; H = Home; W = Win; D = Draw; L = Loss

==== Results ====
11 March 2018 1	Kairat	2 – 1	Kyzylzhar	Almaty
15:00 (UTC+6)	Silveira (yellow card) 28'; Isael 80'; Kuat (yellow card) 81'; Arshavin 87'	Report	Punoševac 26' (yellow card) 49'; Muldarov (yellow card) 56'; Aliyev (yellow card) 90+2'	Stadium: Central Stadium; Attendance: 7,500; Referee: Bolat Saryev

17 March 2018 2	Kairat	2 – 0	Atyrau	Almaty
15:00 (UTC+6)	Akhmetov (yellow card) 2'; Silveira 56'; Vorogovskiy 86'	Report	Adeniji (yellow card) 4' (yellow-red card) 34'	Stadium: Central Stadium; Attendance: 7,900; Referee: Denis Izmailov

31 March 2018 3	Aktobe	1 – 1	Kairat	Shymkent
15:00 (UTC+6)	Bateau 11' (o.g.)	Report	Isael 18'; Kuat (yellow card) 34'; A.Sokolenko (yellow card) 67'; Elek (yellow card) 73'	Stadium: Kazhymukan Munaitpasov Stadium; Attendance: 1,500; Referee: Igor Aleshin

7 April 2018 4	Kairat	3 – 0	Akzhayik	Almaty
17:00 (UTC+6)	Isael 19' (yellow card) 80'; Silveira 33'; Zhukov 81'	Report	Nurgaliyev (yellow card) 6'; A.Tkachuk (yellow card) 60'	Stadium: Central Stadium; Attendance: 7,100; Referee: Bakhyt Kyzylbaev

14 April 2018 5	Astana	1 – 1	Kairat	Astana
15:00 (UTC+6)	Zaynutdinov 52' (yellow card) 74'; Shomko (yellow card) 88'; Tomasov (yellow card) 90+5'; Kleinheisler (yellow card) 90+5'	Report	Silveira (yellow card) 40'; Suyumbayev (yellow card) 60'; Arshavin 71' (yellow card) 90+5'; Kuat (yellow card) 72'; Aybol Abiken (yellow card) 90+5'	Stadium: Astana Arena; Attendance: 12,000; Referee: Artyom Kuchin

22 April 2018 6	Kairat	4 – 1	Kaisar	Almaty
17:00 (UTC+6)	Isael 19'; Juan Felipe (yellow card) 53'; Arshavin 60'; Anene 76'; Lunin 90+3'	Report	Coureur 27'; Narzildaev (yellow card) 44'	Stadium: Central Stadium; Attendance: 10,200; Referee: Marat Iskakov

28 April 2018 7	Irtysh Pavlodar	1 – 2	Kairat	Pavlodar
17:00 (UTC+6)	Popadiuc 12' (yellow card) 22'; R.Yesimov (yellow card) 83'	Report	Elek (yellow card) 5'; Bateau (yellow card) 17'; Arshavin 45'; Anene 63'	Stadium: Central Stadium; Attendance: 3,500; Referee: Askhat Abdanbayev

5 May 2018 8	Zhetysu	1 – 3	Kairat	Taldıqorğan
17:00 (UTC+6)	Kozhamberdi 47'; Glavina (yellow card) 58'	Report	Anene 10' (yellow card) 78'; Rudoselskiy 16' (o.g.); Lunin 71'	Stadium: Zhetysu Stadium; Attendance: 3,000; Referee: Aleksandr Gauzer

9 May 2018 9	Kairat	2 – 0	Ordabasy	Almaty
17:00 (UTC+6)	Isael 18'; Suyumbayev (yellow card) 37'; Silveira 70'	Report		Stadium: Central Stadium; Attendance: 13,500; Referee: Bagdat Abdullaev

13 May 2018 10	Tobol	1 – 0	Kairat	Kostanay
17:00 (UTC+6)	Kankava (yellow card) 25'; Nusserbayev (yellow card) 45' (goal) 89'; Nepohodov (yellow card) 90+3'	Report	Aybol Abiken (yellow card) 90'	Stadium: Central Stadium; Attendance: 5,500; Referee: Igor Chesnokov

19 May 2018 11	Kairat	2 – 0	Shakhter Karagandy	Almaty
18:00 (UTC+6)	Suyumbayev 43'; Juan Felipe (yellow card) 47'; Islamkhan 79'	Report	Mihunov (yellow card) 24'; Kojašević (yellow card) 43'	Stadium: Central Stadium; Attendance: 10,000; Referee: Bakhyt Kyzylbaev

27 May 2018 12	Atyrau	1 – 3	Kairat	Atyrau
19:00 (UTC+6)	Živković (yellow card) 15'; R.Aslan (yellow card) 79'; Adeniji 69'	Report	Arshavin 28'; Isael 33'; Anene 68' (yellow card) 81'	Stadium: Tomarly Stadion; Attendance: 1,000; Referee: Artyom Kuchin

31 May 2018 13	Kairat	3 – 2	Aktobe	Almaty
19:00 (UTC+6)	Islamkhan 3'; Suyumbayev (yellow card) 14'; Iličević 77'; Isael (yellow card) 81'; Silveira 89'	Report	Pizzelli 15', 30'; Reynaldo (yellow card) 73'; R.Nurmukhametov (yellow card) 89'	Stadium: Central Stadium; Attendance: 11,500; Referee: Daniyar Sakhi

17 June 2018 14	Akzhayik	1 – 2	Kairat	Oral
19:00 (UTC+6)	E.Tapalov (yellow card) 21'; Mané 86'	Report	Arshavin 42' (yellow card) 85'; Iličević (yellow card) 70'; Silveira (yellow card) 80'	Stadium: Petr Atoyan Stadium; Attendance: 3,000; Referee: Furkat Atajanov

24 June 2018 15	Kairat	1 – 2	Astana	Almaty
20:30 (UTC+6)	Kuat 30' (yellow card) 63'; Juan Felipe (yellow card) 54'	Report	Despotović 45+2' (yellow card) 90+3'; Shomko (yellow card) 52'; Mayewski (yellow card) 54'; Murtazayev 88'	Stadium: Central Stadium; Attendance: 19,200; Referee: Bagdat Abdullaev

1 July 2018 16	Kaisar	1 – 2	Kairat	Kyzylorda
19:00 (UTC+6)	Baizhanov 60'; Narzildaev (yellow card) 77'	Report	Isael 64'; Islamkhan 90+4'	Stadium: Gani Muratbayev Stadium; Attendance: 2,500; Referee: Bolat Karlibayev

6 July 2018 17	Kairat	4 – 0	Irtysh Pavlodar	Almaty
19:00 (UTC+6)	Isael 24', 58'; Eseola 37'; Arshavin 44'; Bateau (yellow card) 78'; Suyumbayev (yellow card) 79'; Juan Felipe (yellow card) 88'	Report	Kislitsyn (yellow card) 22'; V.Vomenko (yellow card) 50'	Stadium: Central Stadium; Attendance: 4,000; Referee: Bolat Saryev

15 July 2018 18	Kairat	2 – 1	Zhetysu	Almaty
19:00 (UTC+6)	Eseola 56'; Eppel 66'	Report	E.Altynbekov 90'	Stadium: Central Stadium; Attendance: 2,000; Referee: Saken Bayimbet

22 July 2018 19	Ordabasy	2 – 1	Kairat	Shymkent
20:00 (UTC+6)	T.Erlanov 13'; V.Li (yellow card) 50'; Kovalchuk (yellow card) 56'; Diakate 84' (pen.)	Report	Kuat (yellow card) 44'; Eseola 54'; Aybol Abiken (yellow card) 82'; Pokatilov (yellow card) 84'; Islamkhan (yellow card) 85'	Stadium: Kazhymukan Munaitpasov Stadium; Attendance: 3,500; Referee: Igor Chesnokov

29 July 2018 20	Kairat	1 – 0	Tobol	Almaty
19:00 (UTC+6)	Bateau (yellow card) 44'; Isael 69'	Report	S.Zharynbetov (yellow card) 15'; Abilgazy (yellow card) 28'; T.Zhakupov (yellow card) 51'	Stadium: Central Stadium; Attendance: 3,000; Referee: Grigory Moskovchenko

5 August 2018 21	Shakhter Karagandy	1 – 1	Kairat	Karaganda
20:00 (UTC+6)	Omirtayev (yellow card) 40'; Vůch 54'; Kojašević (yellow card) 60'; A.Duysen (yellow card) 90'	Report	Iličević (yellow card) 21'; Eseola (yellow card) 76'; Arshavin 90+3' (pen.)	Stadium: Shakhter Stadium; Attendance: 6,000; Referee: Ashkat Abdanbayev

12 August 2018 22	Kyzylzhar	1 – 3	Kairat	Petropavl
17:00 (UTC+6)	Grigalashvili 17' (pen.); Ceesay (yellow card) 29'; Coronel (yellow card) 51'; Delić (yellow card) 78'	Report	Eseola 15'; Eppel 63'; Isael 90+4'	Stadium: Avangard Stadium; Attendance: 7,500; Referee: Bakhyt Kyzylbaev

18 August 2018 23	Kyzylzhar	–	Kairat	Petropavl
(UTC+6)				Stadium: Avangard Stadium

26 August 2018 24	Kairat	4 – 2	Atyrau	Almaty
19:00 (UTC+6)	A.Sokolenko 16'; Isael (yellow card) 59'; Eseola 73', 90+2'; Arshavin 71'	Report	Adeniji 46', 55'; A.Saparov (yellow card) 72'; Sikimić (yellow card) 80'	Stadium: Central Stadium; Attendance: 2,000; Referee: Bagdat Abdullaev

16 September 2018 26	Kairat	0 – 1	Akzhayik	Almaty
19:00 (UTC+6)	Bateau (yellow card) 27'; Isael (yellow card) 28'; Eseola (yellow card) 90+1'	Report	Nurgaliyev 76'; E.Tapalov (yellow card) 90+4'	Stadium: Central Stadium; Attendance: 4,000; Referee: Zhandos Abzhan

22 September 2018 27	Zhetysu	1 – 0	Kairat	Taldıqorğan
16:00 (UTC+6)	Hromțov (yellow card) 62'; Kuklys 89' (pen.)	Report	Eppel (yellow card) 12'; Arshavin (yellow card) 28'; Juan Felipe (yellow card) 54'; Zhukov (yellow card) 71'; Palitsevich (yellow card) 88'	Stadium: Zhetysu Stadium; Attendance: 2,000; Referee: Anatolyi Vishnichenko

26 September 2018 25	Kaisar	1 – 2	Kariat	Kyzylorda
16:00 (UTC+6)	Punoševac (yellow card) 34'; Arzhanov 51'	Report	Eseola 25'; Paragulgov (yellow card) 27'; Iličević 35' (yellow card) 38'; Akhmetov (yellow card) 68' (yellow-red card) 76'	Stadium: Gani Muratbayev Stadium; Attendance: 2,800; Referee: Denis Tevyashov

30 September 2018 28	Kairat	6 – 1	Aktobe	Almaty
17:00 (UTC+6)	Paragulgov 10'; Zhukov 16'; Isael 25', 71'; Bateau (yellow card) 35'; Eseola 50'; Eppel 62'	Report	Aimbetov 66'	Stadium: Central Stadium; Attendance: 7,500; Referee: Artyom Kuchin

6 October 2018 29	Ordabasy	2 – 0	Kairat	Shymkent
17:00 (UTC+6)	Moldakaraev 38'; Kojić (yellow card) 41'; Dosmagambetov 90+3' (yellow card) 90+3'; Mehanović (yellow card) 90+4'	Report	Eseola (yellow card) 45+2'; Suyumbayev (yellow card) 57'	Stadium: Kazhymukan Munaitpasov Stadium; Attendance: 3,000; Referee: Bakhyt Kyzylbaev

21 October 2018 30	Kairat	0 – 0	Tobol	Almaty
15:00 (UTC+6)	Akhmetov (yellow card) 54'; Zhukov (yellow card) 88'; Eseola (yellow card) 90+1'; Kuat (yellow card) 90+3'	Report	Žulpa (yellow card) 53'	Stadium: Central Stadium; Attendance: 3,500; Referee: Bolat Karlibayev

27 October 2018 31	Kairat	0 – 1	Irtysh Pavlodar	Almaty
15:00 (UTC+6)	Islamkhan (yellow card) 37'; Alip (yellow card) 44'; Arshavin (red card) 86'; Aybol Abiken (yellow card) 90+2'	Report	Fonseca 2'; Chibuike (yellow card) 15'; Stamenković (yellow card) 90+2'	Stadium: Central Stadium; Attendance: 2,500; Referee: Bolat Saryev

31 October 2018 23	Kyzylzhar	2 – 1	Kairat	Petropavl
15:00 (UTC+6)	Skorykh (yellow card) 34'; T.Muldinov 37'; A.Dzhanuzakov (yellow card) 52'; Ceesay (yellow card) 53' (goal) 81'; Tsirin (yellow card) 90+4'	Report	Paragulgov 6'; Alip (yellow card) 30'; Kuat (yellow card) 50'	Stadium: Avangard Stadium; Attendance: 2,500; Referee: Askhat Abdanbayev

3 November 2018 32	Astana	3 – 2	Kairat	Astana
17:00 (UTC+6)	Rukavina (yellow card) 23'; Tomasov 35'; Zaynutdinov 39'; Murtazayev 61' (yellow card) 90+3'; Mayewski (yellow card) 90+1'	Report	Sarsenov (yellow card) 14'; Paragulgov 22'; Kuat (yellow card) 29'; Vorogovskiy (yellow card) 37'; Eseola 60'; Akhmetov (yellow card) 87'; Alip (yellow card) 90+1'	Stadium: Astana Arena; Attendance: 3,200; Referee: Artyom Kuchin

11 November 2018 33	Kairat	0 – 0	Shakhter Karagandy	Almaty
15:00 (UTC+6)	Paragulgov (yellow card) 14'; Shvyrev (yellow card) 28'	Report	Tkachuk (yellow card) 14'; Droppa (yellow card) 49'; I.Shatsky (yellow card) 90+5'	Stadium: Central Stadium; Attendance: 10,500; Referee: Bagdat Abdullaev

==== League table ====
Pos	Team	Pld	W	D	L	GF	GA	GD	Pts	Qualification or relegation
1	Astana (C)	33	24	5	4	66	22	+44	77	Qualification for the Champions League first qualifying round
2	Kairat	33	19	5	9	60	33	+27	62	Qualification for the Europa League first qualifying round (Note: Since the winners of 2018 Kazakhstan Cup, Kairat, qualified for European competition based on their league position, the spot awarded to the Cup winner (Europa League first qualifying round) was passed to the next best-placed team (the fourth-placed team).)
3	Tobol	33	15	8	10	36	30	+6	53	Qualification for the Europa League first qualifying round
4	Ordabasy	33	13	7	13	38	44	−6	46	Qualification for the Europa League first qualifying round
5	Kaisar	33	11	12	10	35	31	+4	45	

Source: UEFA, Soccerway
Rules for classification: 1) Points; 2) Goal difference; 3) Matches won; 4) Goals scored; 5) Away goals scored; 6) Head-to-head points; 7) Head-to-head matches won; 8) Head-to-head goal difference; 9) Head-to-head goals scored; 10) Head-to-head away goals scored; 11) Draw.
(C) Champions

=== Kazakhstan Cup ===
18 April 2018 Last 16	Okzhetpes	3 – 5	Kairat	Kokshetau
14:00 (UTC+6)	Kasyanov 36'; Geteriev 49'; Abdulin 69'; Hoshkoderya (yellow card) 85'	Report	Islamkhan 5' (pen.), 66' (pen.), 70'; Paragulgov (yellow card) 35' (goal) 55'; A.Kassym (yellow card) 73'; R.Orazov (yellow card) 87'; V.Shvyrev 90+4'	Stadium: Okzhetpes Stadium; Attendance: 2,500; Referee: Zhandos Abzhan

23 May 2018 Quarterfinal	Ordabasy	1 – 1 (a.e.t.)	Kairat	Shymkent
18:00 (UTC+6)	Aybol Abiken 50' (o.g.); Fontanello (yellow card) 53'; Spahija (yellow card) 90+3'; U.Zhaksybaev (yellow card) 111'	Report	Kuat (yellow card) 22'; Paragulgov (yellow card) 34'; Vorogovskiy 45'; A.Sokolenko (yellow card) 65'; Sarsenov (yellow card) 85'; Pokatilov (yellow card) 90+4'; Alip (yellow card) 101'; Shushenachev (yellow card) 115'	Stadium: Kazhymukan Munaitpasov Stadium; Attendance: 4,000; Referee: Timur Kumashev

14 June 2018 Semifinal 1st leg	Kairat	2 – 0	Irtysh Pavlodar	Almaty
19:00 (UTC+6)	Kuat 7' (yellow card) 19'; Alip (yellow card) 19'; Islamkhan 27'; Sarsenov (yellow card) 83'	Report	D.Shmidt (yellow card) 30'	Stadium: Central Stadium; Attendance: 5,800; Referee: Askhat Abdanbayev

27 June 2018 Semifinal 2nd leg	Irtysh Pavlodar	3 – 1 (3 – 3 (a) agg.)	Kairat	Pavlodar
19:00 (UTC+6)	Fonseca 5', 70' (yellow card) 89'; V.Vomenko 80'	Report	Paragulgov (yellow card) 26'; A.Bakhtiyarov 42'; Suyumbayev (yellow card) 44'	Stadium: Central Stadium; Attendance: 3,000; Referee: Denis Tevyashov

==== Final ====
24 November 2018	Atyrau	0 – 1	Kairat	Astana
15:00 (UTC+6)	Obšivač (yellow card) 53'; A.Saparov (yellow card) 83'; Khairullin (red card) 90+5'	Report	A.Sokolenko 16'; S.Keyler (yellow card) 41'; Shvyrev (yellow card) 90+3'	Stadium: Astana Arena; Attendance: 4,500; Referee: Bakhyt Kyzylbaev

=== UEFA Europa League ===
==== Qualifying rounds ====
13 July 2018 First qualifying round 1st leg	Engordany (Andorra)	0 – 3	(Kazakhstan) Kairat	Andorra la Vella, Andorra
00:00 (UTC+6)	Cellay (yellow card) 25'; M.Spano (yellow card) 63'; Touré (yellow card) 86'	Report	Wagner 5' (o.g.); Islamkhan 25' (pen.); Alip (yellow card) 48'; Plotnikov (yellow card) 70'; Zhukov (yellow card) 79'; Eppel 90'	Stadium: Estadi Comunal d'Andorra la Vella; Attendance: 657; Referee: Iwan Arwel Griffith (Wales)

19 July 2018 First qualifying round 2nd leg	Kairat (Kazakhstan)	7 – 1 (10 – 1 agg.)	(Andorra) Engordany	Almaty, Kazakhstan
19:00 (UTC+6)	Eppel 4', 11', 44', 75'; Eseola 42'; Islamkhan 53'; Vorogovskiy 87'	Report	M.Lafont 72'; Cellay (yellow card) 89'	Stadium: Central Stadium; Attendance: 10,500; Referee: Jovan Kaludjerović (Montenegro)

26 July 2018 Second qualifying round 1st leg	Kairat (Kazakhstan)	2 – 0	(Netherlands) AZ	Almaty, Kazakhstan
21:00 (UTC+6)	Eseola 12', 50' (yellow card) 16'; Islamkhan (yellow card) 55'; Suyumbayev (yellow card) 81'	Report	Hatzidiakos (yellow card) 42'; Friday (yellow card) 85'	Stadium: Central Stadium; Attendance: 20,000; Referee: Aliyar Aghayev (Azerbaijan)

3 August 2018 Second qualifying round 2nd leg	AZ (Netherlands)	2 – 1 (2 – 3 agg.)	(Kazakhstan) Kairat	Alkmaar, Netherlands
00:45 (UTC+6)	Bizot (yellow card) 27'; Til 41'; Ouwejan (yellow card) 56'; Midtsjø (yellow card) 75'; Koopmeiners 90+4'	Report	Islamkhan 28' (pen.); Plotnikov (yellow card) 62'; Isael (yellow card) 65'; Vorogovskiy (yellow card) 90+1'	Stadium: AFAS Stadion; Attendance: 9,437; Referee: Dimitar Mečkarovski (Macedonia)

9 August 2018 Third qualifying round 1st leg	Sigma Olomouc (Czech Republic)	2 – 0	(Kazakhstan) Kairat	Olomouc, Czech Republic
23:00 (UTC+6)	Sladký 21'; Pilař 50'; Vepřek (yellow card) 59' (yellow-red card) 68'; Kalvach (yellow card) 88'	Report	Suyumbayev (red card) 38'; Eseola (yellow card) 41'	Stadium: Andrův stadion Attendance: 6,118; Referee: Massimiliano Irrati (Italy)

16 August 2018 Third qualifying round 2nd leg	Kairat (Kazakhstan)	1 – 2 (1 – 4 agg.)	(Czech Republic) Sigma Olomouc	Almaty, Kazakhstan
20:00 (UTC+6)	Juan Felipe (yellow card) 58' (yellow-red card) 75'; Eppel 61' (yellow card) 84'; Isael (red card) 90+4'	Report	Nešpor 19'; Houska 51'	Stadium: Central Stadium; Attendance: 20,000; Referee: Sandro Schärer (Switzerland)

== Squad statistics ==
As of match played 24 November 2018

=== Appearances and goals ===
No.	Pos	Nat	Player	Total		Premier League		Kazakhstan Cup		Super Cup		Europa League	
No.	Pos	Nat	Player	Apps	Goals	Apps	Goals	Apps	Goals	Apps	Goals	Apps	Goals
1	GK	(Kazakhstan) KAZ	Vladimir Plotnikov	14	0	6	0	2	0	1	0	5	0
2	DF	(Kazakhstan) KAZ	Yeldos Akhmetov	13	0	11	0	2	0	0	0	0	0
3	MF	(Kazakhstan) KAZ	Yan Vorogovskiy	29	3	17+5	1	4	1	0	0	3	1
4	DF	(Trinidad and Tobago) TTO	Sheldon Bateau	31	0	25	0	0	0	1	0	4+1	0
5	DF	(Kazakhstan) KAZ	Gafurzhan Suyumbayev	35	1	25+2	1	1+1	0	1	0	5	0
6	MF	(Kazakhstan) KAZ	Nuraly Alip	21	0	15	0	4	0	0	0	2	0
7	MF	(Kazakhstan) KAZ	Islambek Kuat	33	2	22+3	1	2	1	1	0	4+1	0
8	MF	(Kazakhstan) KAZ	Georgy Zhukov	29	2	13+7	2	4	0	1	0	0+4	0
9	MF	(Kazakhstan) KAZ	Bauyrzhan Islamkhan	40	10	20+9	3	4	4	0+1	0	6	3
10	MF	(Brazil) BRA	Isael	34	13	25+3	13	0	0	1	0	5	0
14	DF	(Kazakhstan) KAZ	Aybol Abiken	16	0	5+5	0	5	0	0	0	1	0
15	MF	(Kazakhstan) KAZ	Aleksandr Sokolenko	22	2	9+6	1	5	1	0	0	1+1	0
17	DF	(Kazakhstan) KAZ	Stanislav Lunin	18	2	13	2	1	0	1	0	2+1	0
18	FW	(Ukraine) UKR	Aderinsola Eseola	22	12	9+7	9	0	0	0	0	6	3
19	FW	(Hungary) HUN	Márton Eppel	19	9	6+7	3	0	0	0	0	1+5	6
20	MF	(Croatia) CRO	Ivo Iličević	15	3	9+5	3	0	0	0	0	0+1	0
22	FW	(Kazakhstan) KAZ	Magomed Paragulgov	24	4	14+3	3	4	1	0+1	0	1+1	0
23	FW	(Kazakhstan) KAZ	Vyacheslav Shvyrev	16	1	1+8	0	4+1	1	0	0	0+2	0
24	GK	(Kazakhstan) KAZ	David Loria	1	0	1	0	0	0	0	0	0	0
25	MF	(Hungary) HUN	Ákos Elek	28	0	22	0	0	0	1	0	4+1	0
26	DF	(Belarus) BLR	Syarhey Palitsevich	11	0	6+1	0	0	0	0	0	4	0
27	GK	(Kazakhstan) KAZ	Stas Pokatilov	30	0	26	0	3	0	0	0	1	0
28	MF	(Russia) RUS	Andrey Arshavin	37	9	18+13	9	0	0	1	0	5	0
29	FW	(Kazakhstan) KAZ	Samat Sarsenov	8	0	5	0	1+2	0	0	0	0	0
30	MF	(Brazil) BRA	Juan Felipe	30	0	22+2	0	0	0	0	0	6	0
32	DF	(Kazakhstan) KAZ	Alibek Kassym	1	0	0	0	0+1	0	0	0	0	0
37	MF	(Kazakhstan) KAZ	Rashid Lyukhay	1	0	1	0	0	0	0	0	0	0
38	MF	(Kazakhstan) KAZ	Ramazan Orazov	5	0	1	0	1+3	0	0	0	0	0
51	DF	(Kazakhstan) KAZ	Sergey Keyler	7	0	2	0	4+1	0	0	0	0	0
55	FW	(Kazakhstan) KAZ	Artur Shushenachev	3	0	0	0	0+3	0	0	0	0	0
	MF	(Kazakhstan) KAZ	Maksim Kotov	1	0	0	0	0+1	0	0	0	0	0
	MF	(Kazakhstan) KAZ	Rashid Lyukhay	1	0	0	0	0+1	0	0	0	0	0
	FW	(Kazakhstan) KAZ	Pavel Kriventsev	1	0	0	0	0+1	0	0	0	0	0
Players away from Kairat on loan:
Players who left Kairat during the season:
11	FW	(Uruguay) URU	Hugo Silveira	16	4	10+5	4	0	0	1	0	0	0
19	MF	(Israel) ISR	Gai Assulin	2	0	1	0	0	0	0+1	0	0	0
21	FW	(Norway) NOR	Chuma Anene	9	4	3+6	4	0	0	0	0	0	0
26	DF	(Ivory Coast) CIV	Cédric Gogoua	1	0	0	0	0	0	1	0	0	0
49	MF	(Kazakhstan) KAZ	Akmal Bakhtiyarov	4	1	0	0	4	1	0	0	0	0

=== Goal scorers ===
Place	Position	Nation	Number	Name	Premier League	Kazakhstan Cup	Super Cup	Europa League	Total
1	MF	(Brazil)	10	Isael	13	0	0	0	13
2	FW	(Ukraine)	18	Aderinsola Eseola	9	0	0	3	12
3	MF	(Kazakhstan)	9	Bauyrzhan Islamkhan	3	4	0	3	10
4	MF	(Russia)	28	Andrey Arshavin	9	0	0	0	9
4	FW	(Hungary)	19	Márton Eppel	3	0	0	6	9
6	FW	(Norway)	21	Chuma Anene	4	0	0	0	4
6	FW	(Uruguay)	11	Hugo Silveira	4	0	0	0	4
6	MF	(Kazakhstan)	22	Magomed Paragulgov	3	1	0	0	4
9	MF	(Croatia)	20	Ivo Iličević	3	0	0	0	3
9	MF	(Kazakhstan)	3	Yan Vorogovskiy	1	1	0	1	3
11	DF	(Kazakhstan)	17	Stanislav Lunin	2	0	0	0	2
11	MF	(Kazakhstan)	7	Islambek Kuat	1	1	0	0	2
11	MF	(Kazakhstan)	15	Aleksandr Sokolenko	1	1	0	0	2
11				Own goal	1	0	0	1	2
15	MF	(Kazakhstan)	8	Georgy Zhukov	1	0	0	0	1
15	DF	(Kazakhstan)	5	Gafurzhan Suyumbayev	1	0	0	0	1
15	FW	(Kazakhstan)	23	Vyacheslav Shvyrev	0	1	0	0	1
15	MF	(Kazakhstan)	49	Akmal Bakhtiyarov	0	1	0	0	1
				TOTALS	60	10	0	14	84

=== Disciplinary record ===
Number	Nation	Position	Name	Premier League		Kazakhstan Cup		Super Cup		Europa League		Total	
Number	Nation	Position	Name	Yellow card	Red card	Yellow card	Red card	Yellow card	Red card	Yellow card	Red card	Yellow card	Red card
1	(Kazakhstan)	GK	Vladimir Plotnikov	0	0	0	0	0	0	2	0	2	0
2	(Kazakhstan)	DF	Yeldos Akhmetov	5	1	0	0	0	0	0	0	5	1
3	(Kazakhstan)	MF	Yan Vorogovskiy	1	0	1	0	0	0	1	0	3	0
4	(Trinidad and Tobago)	DF	Sheldon Bateau	5	0	0	0	0	0	0	0	5	0
5	(Kazakhstan)	DF	Gafurzhan Suyumbayev	5	0	0	0	0	0	1	1	6	1
6	(Kazakhstan)	MF	Nuraly Alip	3	0	2	0	0	0	1	0	6	0
7	(Kazakhstan)	MF	Islambek Kuat	8	0	2	0	0	0	0	0	10	0
8	(Kazakhstan)	MF	Georgy Zhukov	2	0	0	0	0	0	1	0	3	0
9	(Kazakhstan)	MF	Bauyrzhan Islamkhan	2	0	0	0	0	0	1	0	3	0
10	(Brazil)	MF	Isael	4	0	0	0	0	0	1	1	5	1
14	(Kazakhstan)	DF	Aybol Abiken	4	0	0	0	0	0	0	0	4	0
15	(Kazakhstan)	MF	Aleksandr Sokolenko	0	0	1	0	0	0	0	0	1	0
18	(Ukraine)	FW	Aderinsola Eseola	4	0	1	0	0	0	1	0	6	0
19	(Hungary)	FW	Márton Eppel	1	0	0	0	0	0	1	0	2	0
20	(Croatia)	MF	Ivo Iličević	2	0	0	0	0	0	0	0	2	0
22	(Kazakhstan)	MF	Magomed Paragulgov	2	0	3	0	0	0	0	0	5	0
23	(Kazakhstan)	FW	Vyacheslav Shvyrev	1	0	1	0	0	0	0	0	2	0
25	(Hungary)	MF	Ákos Elek	2	0	0	0	0	0	0	0	2	0
26	(Belarus)	DF	Syarhey Palitsevich	1	0	0	0	0	0	0	0	1	0
27	(Kazakhstan)	GK	Stas Pokatilov	1	0	1	0	0	0	0	0	2	0
28	(Russia)	MF	Andrey Arshavin	3	1	0	0	0	0	0	0	3	1
29	(Kazakhstan)	FW	Samat Sarsenov	1	0	2	0	0	0	0	0	3	0
30	(Brazil)	MF	Juan Felipe	5	0	0	0	0	0	2	1	7	1
32	(Kazakhstan)	DF	Alibek Kassym	0	0	1	0	0	0	0	0	1	0
38	(Kazakhstan)	MF	Ramazan Orazov	0	0	1	0	0	0	0	0	1	0
51	(Kazakhstan)	DF	Sergey Keyler	0	0	1	0	0	0	0	0	1	0
55	(Kazakhstan)	FW	Artur Shushenachev	0	0	1	0	0	0	0	0	1	0
Players who left Kairat during the season:
11	(Uruguay)	FW	Hugo Silveira	3	0	0	0	0	0	0	0	3	0
21	(Norway)	FW	Chuma Anene	2	0	0	0	0	0	0	0	2	0
26	(Ivory Coast)	DF	Cédric Gogoua	0	0	0	0	1	0	0	0	1	0
			TOTALS	67	2	16	0	1	0	13	3	97	5
