= 2017 FC Kairat season =

FC Kairat
2017 season
- Chairman: Kairat Boranbayev
- Manager: Kakhaber Tskhadadze (until 21 July); Sergei Labodovsky (Caretaker) (23-26 July); Carlos Ferrer (from 26 July)
- Stadium: Central Stadium
- Premier League: 2nd
- Kazakhstan Cup: Winners
- Kazakhstan Super Cup: Winners
- Europa League: Second qualifying round vs Skënderbeu Korçë
- Top goalscorer: League: Gerard Gohou (24); All: Gerard Gohou (31)
Home colours	Away colours	Third colours

The 2017 FC Kairat season was the seventh successive season that the club played in the Kazakhstan Premier League, the highest tier of association football in Kazakhstan, since their promotion back to the top flight in 2009. Kairat participated in the Kazakhstan Super Cup and the Europa League as well as the Kazakhstan Cup and Premier League.

On 21 July, Kakhaber Tskhadadze resigned as manager following Kiarat's elimination from the Europa League, with Sergei Labodovsky being placed in temporary charge on 23 July. On 26 July, Carlos Ferrer was announced as Kairats new permanent manager, agreeing a deal until the end of the 2017 season.

== Squad ==
As of match played 5 November 2017

No.	Name	Nationality	Position	Date of birth (age)	Signed from	Signed in	Apps.	Goals
Goalkeepers
1	Vladimir Plotnikov	(Kazakhstan)	GK	3 April 1986 (aged 31)	Zhetysu	2015	94	0
27	Stas Pokatilov	(Kazakhstan)	GK	8 December 1992 (aged 24)	Rostov	2017	32	0
30	Oleg Grubov	(Kazakhstan)	GK	4 March 1997 (aged 20)	Academy	2015	1	0
51	Vladimir Groshev	(Kazakhstan)	GK	4 January 1995 (aged 22)	Academy	2012	1	0
Defenders
2	Timur Rudoselskiy	(Kazakhstan)	DF	21 December 1994 (aged 22)	Academy	2013	76	0
4	Yeldos Akhmetov	(Kazakhstan)	DF	1 June 1990 (aged 27)	Irtysh Pavlodar	2017	30	1
5	Gafurzhan Suyumbayev	(Kazakhstan)	DF	19 August 1990 (aged 27)	Ordabasy	2016	59	5
6	Žarko Marković	(Serbia)	DF	28 January 1987 (aged 30)	Gaz Metan Mediaș	2014	109	9
13	Yermek Kuantayev	(Kazakhstan)	DF	13 October 1990 (aged 27)	Tobol	2014	96	6
14	César Arzo	(Spain)	DF	21 January 1986 (aged 31)	AEK Athens	2014	49	3
19	Stanislav Lunin	(Kazakhstan)	DF	2 May 1993 (aged 24)	Shakhter Karagandy	2014	75	1
29	Sheldon Bateau	(Trinidad and Tobago)	DF	29 January 1991 (aged 26)	loan from Krylia Sovetov	2017	17	0
31	Cédric Gogoua	(Ivory Coast)	DF	10 July 1994 (aged 23)	Riga	2017	0	0
32	Alibek Kassym	(Kazakhstan)	DF	27 May 1998 (aged 19)	Academy	2015	0	0
46	Yeskendir Kybyray	(Kazakhstan)	DF	14 August 1997 (aged 20)	Academy	2017	0	0
48	Dilshat Musayev	(Kazakhstan)	DF	9 January 1995 (aged 22)	Academy	2012	0	0
57	Aybol Abiken	(Kazakhstan)	DF	1 June 1996 (aged 21)	Academy	2015	5	1
Midfielders
3	Yan Vorogovskiy	(Kazakhstan)	MF	7 August 1996 (aged 21)	Kaisar	2016	26	0
7	Islambek Kuat	(Kazakhstan)	MF	12 January 1993 (aged 24)	Astana	2014	109	11
9	Bauyrzhan Islamkhan	(Kazakhstan)	MF	23 February 1993 (aged 24)	Kuban Krasnodar	2014	155	47
10	Isael	(Brazil)	MF	13 May 1988 (aged 29)	Krasnodar	2014	136	29
15	Baurzhan Turysbek	(Kazakhstan)	MF	15 October 1991 (aged 26)	Zhetysu	2016	33	6
16	Oybek Baltabaev	(Kazakhstan)	MF	13 June 1994 (aged 23)	Academy	2014	11	0
20	Ivo Iličević	(Croatia)	MF	14 November 1986 (aged 31)	Anzhi Makhachkala	2017	26	9
23	Georgy Zhukov	(Kazakhstan)	MF	19 November 1994 (aged 23)	Ural Yekaterinburg	2017	29	2
25	Ákos Elek	(Hungary)	MF	21 July 1988 (aged 29)	Diósgyőri	2017	35	0
28	Andrey Arshavin	(Russia)	MF	29 May 1981 (aged 36)	Kuban Krasnodar	2016	71	21
38	Ramazan Orazov	(Kazakhstan)	MF	30 January 1998 (aged 19)	Academy	2017	0	0
39	Zhandos Soltan	(Kazakhstan)	MF	10 September 1998 (aged 19)	Academy	2015	0	0
49	Akmal Bakhtiyarov	(Kazakhstan)	MF	2 June 1998 (aged 19)	Academy	2017	0	0
58	Aleksandr Sokolenko	(Kazakhstan)	MF	23 November 1996 (aged 21)	Academy	2017	7	0
61	Aleksandr Starodubov	(Kazakhstan)	MF	20 September 1997 (aged 20)	Academy	2017	0	0
64	Maksim Kotov	(Kazakhstan)	MF	9 February 1997 (aged 20)	Academy	2015	0	0
	Nurlan Dairov	(Kazakhstan)	MF	26 June 1995 (aged 22)	Academy	2012	3	0
Forwards
11	Gerard Gohou	(Ivory Coast)	FW	29 December 1988 (aged 28)	Krasnodar	2014	137	99
21	Chuma Anene	(Norway)	FW	14 May 1993 (aged 24)	Amkar Perm	2017	29	4
55	Artur Shushenachev	(Kazakhstan)	FW	7 April 1998 (aged 19)	Academy	2017	1	0
59	Samat Sarsenov	(Russia)	FW	19 August 1996 (aged 21)	Orenburg	2017	0	0
63	Magomed Paragulgov	(Kazakhstan)	FW	26 March 1994 (aged 23)	Academy	2012	9	1
	Rifat Nurmugamet	(Kazakhstan)	FW	22 May 1996 (aged 21)	Academy	2013	5	0
	Mohamed Konaté	(Ivory Coast)	FW	12 December 1997 (aged 19)	Babīte	2017	0	0

== Transfers ==
=== In ===
Date	Position	Nationality	Name	From	Fee	Ref.
18 November 2016	DF	(Kazakhstan)	Yeldos Akhmetov	Irtysh Pavlodar	Undisclosed	
5 December 2016	MF	(Kazakhstan)	Georgy Zhukov	Ural Yekaterinburg	Undisclosed	
13 December 2016	GK	(Kazakhstan)	Stas Pokatilov	Rostov	Undisclosed	
30 January 2017	MF	(Croatia)	Ivo Iličević	Anzhi Makhachkala	Undisclosed	
8 March 2017	MF	(Hungary)	Ákos Elek	Diósgyőr	Undisclosed	
13 March 2017	FW	(Norway)	Chuma Anene	Amkar Perm	Undisclosed	
27 March 2017	FW	(Russia)	Samat Sarsenov	Orenburg	Undisclosed	
11 July 2017	DF	(Ivory Coast)	Cédric Gogoua	Riga	Undisclosed	
11 July 2017	FW	(Ivory Coast)	Mohamed Konaté	Babīte	Undisclosed	

=== Out ===
Date	Position	Nationality	Name	To	Fee	Ref.
26 November 2016	FW	(Cameroon)	Léandre Tawamba	Partizan Belgrade	Undisclosed	
29 December 2016	MF	(Kazakhstan)	Aslan Darabayev	Irtysh Pavlodar	Undisclosed	
29 August 2017	MF	(Russia)	Mikhail Bakayev	Anzhi Makhachkala	Undisclosed	

=== Loans in ===
Date from	Position	Nationality	Name	From	Date to	Ref.
27 June 2017	DF	(Trinidad and Tobago)	Sheldon Bateau	Krylia Sovetov	End of season	

=== Loans out ===
Date from	Position	Nationality	Name	To	Date to	Ref.
11 February 2017	DF	(Kazakhstan)	Nurlan Dairov	Okzhetpes	End of season	
1 March 2017	FW	(Kazakhstan)	Rifat Nurmugamet	Zhetysu	End of season	

=== Released ===
Date	Position	Nationality	Name	Joined	Date	Ref.
5 March 2017	DF	(Brazil)	Bruno Soares	Haugesund	7 March 2017	
1 July 2017	MF	(Chile)	Gerson Acevedo	Deportes Iquique	1 July 2017	
13 November 2017	DF	(Serbia)	Žarko Marković	Inđija		
13 November 2017	FW	(Ivory Coast)	Gerard Gohou	Beijing Enterprises	5 February 2018	
21 November 2017	DF	(Spain)	César Arzo	Gimnàstic	29 December 2017	
31 December 2017	DF	(Kazakhstan)	Timur Rudoselskiy	Zhetysu		

== Friendlies ==
19 January 2017	Kukësi (Albania)	0 – 1	(Kazakhstan) Kairat	Antalya, Turkey
(UTC+6)		Summary	Gohou 49'

19 January 2017	Orenburg (Russia)	0 – 3	(Kazakhstan) Kairat	Antalya, Turkey
(UTC+6)		Summary	Gohou 21', 31'; Turysbek 80'

28 January 2017	DAC Dunajská Streda (Slovakia)	0 – 1	(Kazakhstan) Kairat	Antalya, Turkey
(UTC+6)		Summary	Vorogovskiy 73'

31 January 2017	Fastav Zlín (Czech Republic)	0 – 2	(Kazakhstan) Kairat	Antalya, Turkey
(UTC+6)		Summary	Islamkhan 76'; Zhukov 81'

5 February 2017	Lokomotiv Plovdiv (Bulgaria)	2 – 4	(Kazakhstan) Kairat	Antalya, Turkey
(UTC+6)	Kiki 73'; Hammoud 75'	Summary	Gohou 1', 65', 83'; Isael 59'

6 February 2017	Mladost Doboj Kakanj (Bosnia and Herzegovina)	2 – 1	(Kazakhstan) Kairat	Antalya, Turkey
(UTC+6)	Brkić 42'; Šišić 90+2'	Summary	Turysbek 86'

8 February 2017	RNK Split (Croatia)	0 – 0	(Kazakhstan) Kairat	Antalya, Turkey
(UTC+6)		Summary

17 February 2017	Dynamo Moscow (Russia)	1 – 0	(Kazakhstan) Kairat	Antalya, Turkey
20:00 (UTC+6)	Turysbek 48'	Summary

20 February 2017	Anzhi Makhachkala (Russia)	1 – 0	(Kazakhstan) Kairat	Antalya, Turkey
20:30 (UTC+6)	Katsayev	Summary

23 February 2017	Krylia Sovetov (Russia)	–	(Kazakhstan) Kairat	Antalya, Turkey
20:30 (UTC+6)		[ Summary]

== Competitions ==
=== Kazakhstan Super Cup ===
4 March 2017	Astana	0 – 2	Kairat	Almaty
15:00 (UTC+6)	Mayewski (yellow card) 57'; Logvinenko (yellow card) 84'	Summary	Kuat (yellow card) 28' (yellow-red card) 90+5' (goal) 90+4'; Arshavin (yellow card) 60'; Arzo 76'; Marković (yellow card) 90+3'	Stadium: Central Stadium; Referee: Artyom Kuchin

=== Kazakhstan Premier League ===
==== Results summary ====
Overall								Home						Away					
Pld	W	D	L	GF	GA	GD	Pts	W	D	L	GF	GA	GD	W	D	L	GF	GA	GD
33	23	9	1	74	17	+57	78	13	4	0	43	2	+41	10	5	1	31	15	+16

Last updated: 5 November 2017.
Source: See Results

==== Results by round ====
Round	1	2	3	4	5	6	7	8	9	10	11	12	13	14	15	16	17	18	19	20	21	22	23	24	25	26	27	28	29	30	31	32	33
Ground	H	H	A	H	H	A	A	H	A	H	A	A	A	H	H	A	H	H	A	A	H	A	A	H	A	H	A	H	H	A	H	A	H
Result	W	D	D	D	D	W	D	W	D	W	D	L	W	W	W	W	W	W	W	W	D	W	W	W	W	W	W	W	W	D	W	W	W
Position	5	5	4	6	6	6	6	3	4	2	2	4	3	3	2	2	2	2	2	2	2	2	2	2	2	2	2	1	1	1	2	2	2

Source: See Results
A = Away; H = Home; W = Win; D = Draw; L = Loss

==== Results ====
8 March 2017 1	Kairat	1 – 0	Aktobe	Almaty
16:00 (UTC+6)	Gohou 65'; Pokatilov (yellow card) 90+3'	Report	Volovyk (yellow card) 7'; Cassiano (yellow card) 15'; A.Shurigin (yellow card) 33'; Mamute (yellow card) 53'	Stadium: Central Stadium; Attendance: 10,000; Referee: Furkhat Atazhanov

12 March 2017 2	Kairat	2 – 2	Okzhetpes	Almaty
16:00 (UTC+6)	Marković 34' (yellow card) 90+1'; Akhmetov (yellow card) 45' (yellow-red card) 53'; Islamkhan (yellow card) 56'; Arshavin 83'; Suyumbayev (yellow card) 90+4'	Report	Kozlov 19' (yellow card) 58'; Chertov (yellow card) 35'; Volkov (yellow card) 81' (goal) 90+4' (pen.)	Stadium: Central Stadium; Attendance: 6,500; Referee: Aleksander Gauzer

17 March 2017 3	Taraz	0 – 0	Kairat	Taraz
15:00 (UTC+6)	Diarra (yellow card) 54'	Report	Arshavin (yellow card) 13'; Arzo (yellow card) 13'; Turysbek (yellow card) 54'	Stadium: Central Stadium; Attendance: 4,500; Referee: Denis Izmailov

31 March 2017 4	Kairat	1 – 1	Kaisar	Almaty
19:30 (UTC+6)	Gohou 11'; Arshavin (yellow card) 23'; Arzo (yellow card) 82'	Report	Graf (yellow card) 5'; Baizhanov 35'; Nikolić (yellow card) 46'; Arzhanov (yellow card) 55'; Kamara (yellow card) 74'	Stadium: Central Stadium; Attendance: 14,000; Referee: Denis Tevyashov

4 April 2017 18	Kairat	1 – 1	Irtysh Pavlodar	Almaty
19:30 (UTC+6)	Marković 48'	Report	Vorotnikov 80'	Stadium: Central Stadium; Attendance: 5,000; Referee: Anatolyi Vishnichenko

8 April 2017 5	Shakhter Karagandy	1 – 4	Kairat	Temirtau
15:00 (UTC+6)	Stanojević (yellow card) 62'; A.Allegria 81'; Szöke (yellow card) 82'	Report	Isael 12'; Gohou 17', 19', 65'; Marković (yellow card) 30'	Stadium: Metallurg Stadium; Attendance: 1,000; Referee: Viktor Antonov

12 April 2017 6	Tobol	2 – 2	Kairat	Kostanay
17:30 (UTC+6)	Despotović (yellow card) 46'; Shchotkin 52'; Malyi 83'; D.Miroshnichenko (yellow card) 85'	Report	Iličević 19'; Gohou 41'; Kuat (yellow card) 60'	Stadium: Central Stadium; Attendance: 4,000; Referee: Igor Chesnokov

16 April 2017 7	Kairat	3 – 0	Ordabasy	Almaty
18:00 (UTC+6)	Islamkhan 6'; Marković (yellow card) 40'; Gohou 43'; Iličević 70'; Kuat (yellow card) 75'	Report	Nusserbayev (yellow card) 55'; Nurgaliev (yellow card) 65'; E.Tungyshbaev (yellow card) 67'	Stadium: Central Stadium; Attendance: 15,000; Referee: Igor Aleshin

23 April 2017 8	Irtysh Pavlodar	3 – 3	Kairat	Pavlodar
14:00 (UTC+6)	Živković 13' (pen.); Darabayev 28'; Dja Djédjé 40' (yellow card) 48'; Dvali (yellow card) 59'; S.N'Ganbe (yellow card) 87'; Loria (yellow card) 88'	Report	Gohou 5'; Arzo (yellow card) 54' (yellow-red card) 58'; Zhukov (yellow card) 55'; Iličević 61'; Marković (yellow card) 81'; Kuat (yellow card) 87'; Islamkhan 88'	Stadium: Central Stadium; Attendance: 6,000; Referee: Artyom Kuchin

29 April 2017 9	Kairat	4 – 1	Akzhayik	Almaty
18:00 (UTC+6)	Islamkhan 2'; Gohou 32'; Valiullin 48' (o.g.); Suyumbayev 58'	Report	Valiullin 82'	Stadium: Central Stadium; Attendance: 7,000; Referee: Daniyar Sakhi

2 May 2017 10	Astana	1 – 1	Kairat	Astana
20:00 (UTC+6)	Twumasi (yellow card) 28'; Grahovac 87'; Mayewski (yellow card) 90+3'	Summary	Vorogovskiy (yellow card) 26'; Kuat 34'; Suyumbayev (yellow card) 62'; Gohou (yellow card) 76'	Stadium: Astana Arena; Attendance: 14,500; Referee: Anatoyli Vishnichenko

6 May 2017 11	Atyrau	2 – 1	Kairat	Atyrau
18:30 (UTC+6)	Vorogovskiy 26' (o.g.); Dvalishvili 49'; E.Abdrakhmanov (yellow card) 66'; D.Kayralliyev (yellow card) 86'; Maksimović (yellow card) 90'	Report	Kuat (yellow card) 49'; Isael (yellow card) 61'; Turysbek 90+6'	Stadium: Munaishy Stadium; Attendance: 3,500; Referee: Aleksei Bobrov

14 May 2017 12	Okzhetpes	2 – 3	Kairat	Astana
14:00 (UTC+6)	Strukov 29', 68'; Fedin (yellow card) 44'	Report	Zhukov (yellow card) 42'; Arshavin 74'; Isael 75'; Turysbek 79'	Stadium: Astana Arena; Attendance: 500; Referee: Timur Kumashev

20 May 2017 13	Kairat	4 – 0	Taraz	Almaty
17:00 (UTC+6)	Turysbek 55'; Gohou 58'; Isael 80'; Islamkhan 87' (pen.)	Report	M.Amirkhanov (yellow card) 55'	Stadium: Central Stadium; Attendance: 8,000; Referee: Bolat Karlibayev

28 May 2017 14	Kaisar	1 – 2	Kairat	Kyzylorda
18:00 (UTC+6)	E.Altynbekov (yellow card) 6'; Coureur 9'; Muldarov (yellow card) 31'; Korobkin (yellow card) 52'	Report	Islamkhan 32'; Gohou 36'	Stadium: Gani Muratbayev Stadium; Attendance: 2,500; Referee: Anatoliy Vishnichenko

31 May 2017 20	Kairat	3 – 0	Astana	Almaty
20:30 (UTC+6)	Arshavin 22' (yellow card) 40'; Logvinenko 61' (o.g.); Iličević 77'; Kuat (yellow card) 83'	Report	Logvinenko (yellow card) 29'; Mayewski (yellow card) 70'; Beisebekov (yellow card) 90+3'	Stadium: Central Stadium; Attendance: 19,000; Referee: Denis Izmailov

3 June 2017 15	Kairat	4 – 1	Shakhter Karagandy	Almaty
19:00 (UTC+6)	Gohou 1', 39'; Zhukov (yellow card) 31'; Islamkhan 37'; Turysbek 82'	Report	Stojanović 86'	Stadium: Central Stadium; Attendance: 6,500; Referee: Bagdat Abdullaev

17 June 2017 16	Kairat	2 – 0	Tobol	Almaty
18:30 (UTC+6)	Islamkhan 64' (pen.); Isael 85'	Report		Stadium: Central Stadium; Attendance: 7,100; Referee: Denis Tevyashov

24 June 2017 17	Ordabasy	0 – 2	Kairat	Shymkent
19:00 (UTC+6)	Diakate (yellow card) 22'; S.Zhumahanov (yellow card) 51'; E.Tungyshbaev (yellow card) 55'	Report	Islamkhan (yellow card) 1'; Suyumbayev 7'; Gohou 18'; Kuat (yellow card) 32'; Arshavin (yellow card) 79'	Stadium: Kazhymukan Munaitpasov Stadium; Attendance: 4,500; Referee: Marat Iskakov

9 July 2017 19	Akzhayik	0 – 1	Kairat	Oral
19:00 (UTC+6)		Report	Isael 58'; Islamkhan (yellow card) 68'; Akhmetov (yellow card) 86'	Stadium: Petr Atoyan Stadium; Attendance: 4,000; Referee: Timur Kumashev

23 July 2017 21	Kairat	1 – 1	Atyrau	Almaty
20:00 (UTC+6)	Turysbek 75'	Report	Sikimić 71'; Khairullin (yellow card) 85'	Stadium: Central Stadium; Attendance: 6,800; Referee: Anatoyli Vishnichenko

29 July 2017 22	Aktobe	1 – 2	Kairat	Aktobe
21:00 (UTC+6)	Valiullin (yellow card) 2'; Shestakov (yellow card) 8' (goal) 50'; Sidelnikov (yellow card) 30'; Muarem (yellow card) 40'; Savić (yellow card) 45+2'	Report	Gohou 29' (pen.) (yellow card) 44'; Kuat (yellow card) 36'; Akhmetov (yellow card) 59'; Zhukov 78'	Stadium: Central Stadium; Attendance: 11,500; Referee: Furkat Atajanov

13 August 2017 23	Okzhetpes	0 – 1	Kairat	Shchuchinsk
17:00 (UTC+6)	N.Dairov (yellow card) 53'; Abdulin (yellow card) 59'	Report	Gohou 33'; Kuat (yellow card) 55'; Arzo (yellow card) 63'	Stadium: Zhaksy Stadium; Attendance: 250; Referee: Bagdat Abdullaev

20 August 2017 24	Kairat	3 – 1	Shakhter Karagandy	Almaty
20:00 (UTC+6)	Isael 53'; Gohou 68'; A.Sokolenko (yellow card) 78'; Akhmetov 85'	Report	Stanojević 42'; Y.Tarasov (yellow card) 82'	Stadium: Central Stadium; Attendance: 6,300; Referee: Daniyar Sakhi

26 August 2017 25	Atyrau	0 – 1	Kairat	Atyrau
19:00 (UTC+6)	Ablitarov (yellow card) 71'; Dvalishvili (yellow card) 71'	Report	Suyumbayev (yellow card) 71'; Bakayev (yellow card) 71'; Anene 74'	Stadium: Munaishy Stadium; Attendance: 3,500; Referee: Igor Aleshin

10 September 2017 26	Kairat	3 – 1	Kaisar	Almaty
18:00 (UTC+6)	Isael 14'; Islamkhan 18'; Plotnikov (yellow card) 25'; Arshavin 90+2'	Report	Bojović (yellow card) 22'; Coureur 40' (yellow card) 88'; Kamara (yellow card) 55'	Stadium: Central Stadium; Attendance: 9,000; Referee: Aleksei Bobrov

16 September 2017 27	Taraz	1 – 5	Kairat	Taraz
18:00 (UTC+6)	A.Taubay (yellow card) 22'; D.Babakhanov (yellow card) 64'; Kozhamberdi 83'	Report	Gohou 17'; Elek (yellow card) 38'; Bateau (yellow card) 44'; Islamkhan 52', 64' (pen.); Anene 87'; Arshavin 88'	Stadium: Central Stadium; Attendance: 3,500; Referee: Artyom Kuchin

20 September 2017 30	Kairat	5 – 1	Ordabasy	Almaty
20:00 (UTC+6)	Gohou 7', 55'; A.Sokolenko (yellow card) 47' (yellow-red card) 84'; Arshavin 64'; Paragulgov 67'; Elek (yellow card) 88'; Anene 89'	Report	Petrak (yellow card) 31'; Nurgaliev 48'; Nusserbayev (yellow card) 58'	Stadium: Central Stadium; Attendance: 8,300; Referee: Aleksander Gauzer

24 September 2017 28	Kairat	2 – 0	Tobol	Almaty
15:00 (UTC+6)	Gohou 3'; Suyumbayev (yellow card) 68'; Isael 79'	Report		Stadium: Central Stadium; Attendance: 5,500; Referee: Bagdat Abdullaev

30 September 2017 29	Irtysh Pavlodar	1 – 1	Kairat	Pavlodar
15:00 (UTC+6)	Fonseca 23' (yellow card) 35'; R.Yesimov (yellow card) 39'; Ohirya (yellow card) 73'	Report	Gohou 28'; Arshavin (yellow card) 29'; Arzo (yellow card) 29'; Akhmetov (yellow card) 45+1' (red card) 45+1'; Anene (yellow card) 90+2'	Stadium: Central Stadium; Attendance: 3,000; Referee: Denis Izmailov

21 October 2017 31	Kairat	2 – 1	Akzhayik	Almaty
15:00 (UTC+6)	Islamkhan 10' (pen.) (yellow card) 54'; A.Sokolenko (yellow card) 30'; Anene 67'; Kuat (yellow card) 89'	Report	Odibe (yellow card) 9'; Dudchenko 31' (pen.); Glavina (yellow card) 33'; Arenas (yellow card) 59'; Govedarica (yellow card) 88'	Stadium: Central Stadium; Attendance: 5,500; Referee: Furkat Atajanov

28 October 2017 32	Astana	0 – 2	Kairat	Astana
15:00 (UTC+6)	Twumasi (yellow card) 45'; Shomko (yellow card) 45+2'; Mayewski (yellow card) 67'	Report	Bateau (yellow card) 45+2'; Abiken 71'; Kuat (yellow card) 82'; Gohou 88'; Pokatilov (yellow card) 90+3'	Stadium: Astana Arena; Attendance: 12,000; Referee: Denis Izmailov

5 November 2017 33	Kairat	3 – 2	Aktobe	Almaty
15:00 (UTC+6)	Arzo (yellow card) 32' (goal) 44'; Kuat (yellow card) 33'; Gohou 53' (yellow card) 63'; Arshavin 70'	Report	Muarem (yellow card) 33'; Savić (yellow card) 35' (goal) 60'; Kolčák (yellow card) 70'; Šimkovič 90+7'	Stadium: Central Stadium; Attendance: 14,000

==== League table ====
Pos	Team	Pld	W	D	L	GF	GA	GD	Pts	Qualification or relegation
1	Astana (C)	33	25	4	4	74	21	+53	79	Qualification for the Champions League first qualifying round
2	Kairat	33	23	9	1	75	28	+47	78	Qualification for the Europa League first qualifying round (Note: Kairat qualified for the Europa League first qualifying round by winning the 2017 Kazakhstan Cup.)
3	Ordabasy	33	18	4	11	44	37	+7	58	
4	Irtysh Pavlodar	33	12	12	9	35	32	+3	48	Qualification for the Europa League first qualifying round (Note: Ordabasy would have qualified too, but they failed to obtain a licence, so Tobol took their place.)
5	Tobol	33	12	11	10	36	26	+10	47	Qualification for the Europa League first qualifying round

Source: UEFA, Soccerway
Rules for classification: 1) Points; 2) Head-to-head points; 3) Head-to-head matches won; 4) Head-to-head goal difference; 5) Head-to-head goals scored; 6) Head-to-head away goals scored; 7) Goal difference; 8) Matches won; 9) Goals scored; 10) Away goals scored; 11) Draw.
(C) Champions

=== Kazakhstan Cup ===
19 April 2017 Last 16	Kairat	2 – 0	Taraz	Almaty
19:30 (UTC+6)	Zhukov 33' (yellow card) 50'; Iličević 45+1'	Summary	Kozhamberdi (yellow card) 19' (yellow-red card) 29'; Shipitsin (yellow card) 45+1'	Stadium: Central Stadium; Attendance: 6,000; Referee: Denis Izmailov

10 May 2017 Quarterfinal	Kairat	2 – 0	Irtysh Pavlodar	Almaty
20:00 (UTC+6)	Gohou 8'; Iličević 44'; Kuat (red card) 89'; Suyumbayev (yellow card) 89'	Report	Dja Djédjé (yellow card) 41'; Fonseca (red card) 89'	Stadium: Central Stadium; Attendance: 6,500; Referee: Marat Iskakov

24 May 2017 Semifinal	Ordabasy	0 – 0	Kairat	Shymkent
17:30 (UTC+6)	Simčević (yellow card) 84'	Report	Elek (yellow card) 42'; Akhmetov (yellow card) 45+2' (yellow-red card) 72'; Anene (yellow card) 90+3'	Stadium: Kazhymukan Munaitpasov Stadium; Attendance: 3,000; Referee: Igor Aleshin

21 June 2017 Semifinal	Kairat	3 – 1 (3 – 1 agg.)	Ordabasy	Almaty
19:00 (UTC+6)	Islamkhan 23'; Arshavin 30'; Gohou 37'	Report	T.Erlanov (yellow card) 50' (yellow-red card) 84'; Diakate (yellow card) 80'; Fontanello (yellow card) 85'; V.Li 90+2' (pen.)	Stadium: Central Stadium; Attendance: 6,800; Referee: Artyom Kuchin

==== Final ====
14 October 2017	Kairat	1 – 0	Atyrau	Aktobe
19:00 (UTC+6)	Gohou 70' (red card) 87'	Report		Stadium: Central Stadium; Attendance: 10,400; Referee: Artyom Kuchin

=== UEFA Europa League ===
==== Qualifying rounds ====
29 June 2017 First qualifying round 1st leg	Kiarat (Kazakhstan)	6 – 0	(Lithuania) Atlantas	Almaty, Kazakhstan
20:45 (UTC+6)	Gohou 21', 50' (pen.); Arshavin 26' (pen.), 42'; Iličević 30', 73' (yellow card) 81'	Report	Beneta (yellow card) 67'	Stadium: Central Stadium; Attendance: 15,000; Referee: Omar Pashayev (Azerbaijan)

6 July 2017 First qualifying round 2nd leg	Atlantas (Lithuania)	1 – 2 (1 – 8 agg.)	(Kazakhstan) Kairat	Klaipėda, Lithuania
20:00 (UTC+6)	Ciofu 12'; J.Raziūnas (yellow card) 20'	Report	Iličević 35' (pen.); Gohou 39'; Abiken (yellow card) 88'	Stadium: Klaipėdos centrinis stadionas Attendance: 1,450; Referee: Nicolas Laforge (Belgium)

13 July 2017 Second qualifying round 1st leg	Kiarat (Kazakhstan)	1 – 1	(Albania) Skënderbeu Korçë	Almaty, Kazakhstan
20:45 (UTC+6)	Gohou 9'; Isael (yellow card) 45+2'; Bakayev (yellow card) 50'; Akhmetov (yellow card) 90+3'	Report	Radas (yellow card) 50'; Mici (yellow card) 63'; Nimaga 72'; Vangjeli (yellow card) 76'	Stadium: Central Stadium; Attendance: 7,054; Referee: Leontios Trattou (Cyprus)

20 July 2017 Second qualifying round 2nd leg	Skënderbeu Korçë (Albania)	2 – 0 (3 – 1 agg.)	(Kazakhstan) Kairat	Korçë, Albania
23:00 (UTC+6)	Lilaj (yellow card) 28' (yellow-red card) 75' (goal) 50'; Plaku 83'	Report	Elek (yellow card) 59'; Arzo (red card) 86'; Kuat (yellow card) 90'	Stadium: Skënderbeu Stadium; Attendance: 4,800; Referee: Jens Maae (Denmark)

== Squad statistics ==
As of match played 5 November 2017

=== Appearances and goals ===
No.	Pos	Nat	Player	Total		Premier League		Kazakhstan Cup		Super Cup		Europa League	
No.	Pos	Nat	Player	Apps	Goals	Apps	Goals	Apps	Goals	Apps	Goals	Apps	Goals
1	GK	(Kazakhstan) KAZ	Vladimir Plotnikov	21	0	15	0	3	0	1	0	2	0
2	DF	(Kazakhstan) KAZ	Timur Rudoselskiy	7	0	1+3	0	0+1	0	0+1	0	1	0
3	MF	(Kazakhstan) KAZ	Yan Vorogovskiy	18	0	10+3	0	4	0	0	0	1	0
4	DF	(Kazakhstan) KAZ	Yeldos Akhmetov	30	1	21+2	1	2+1	0	1	0	3	0
5	DF	(Kazakhstan) KAZ	Gafurzhan Suyumbayev	41	2	32	2	4	0	1	0	4	0
6	DF	(Serbia) SRB	Žarko Marković	11	2	9	2	1	0	1	0	0	0
7	MF	(Kazakhstan) KAZ	Islambek Kuat	37	2	30	1	1+1	0	1	1	4	0
9	MF	(Kazakhstan) KAZ	Bauyrzhan Islamkhan	34	12	24+3	11	4	1	1	0	2	0
10	MF	(Brazil) BRA	Isael	40	8	29+2	8	4	0	1	0	3+1	0
11	FW	(Ivory Coast) CIV	Gerard Gohou	40	31	30+2	24	3	3	1	0	4	4
13	DF	(Kazakhstan) KAZ	Yermek Kuantayev	7	0	4+1	0	2	0	0	0	0	0
14	DF	(Spain) ESP	César Arzo	33	2	24+3	1	3	0	1	1	2	0
15	MF	(Kazakhstan) KAZ	Bauyrzhan Turysbek	21	5	3+11	5	1+3	0	0	0	1+2	0
16	MF	(Kazakhstan) KAZ	Oybek Baltabaev	11	0	1+6	0	1+3	0	0	0	0	0
19	DF	(Kazakhstan) KAZ	Stanislav Lunin	3	0	2+1	0	0	0	0	0	0	0
20	MF	(Croatia) CRO	Ivo Iličević	26	9	10+8	4	3+1	2	0+1	0	2+1	3
21	FW	(Norway) NOR	Chuma Anene	29	4	4+16	4	1+3	0	0+1	0	1+3	0
23	MF	(Kazakhstan) KAZ	Georgy Zhukov	29	2	13+10	1	4	1	0+1	0	1	0
25	MF	(Hungary) HUN	Ákos Elek	35	0	27+1	0	3	0	0	0	4	0
27	GK	(Kazakhstan) KAZ	Stas Pokatilov	21	0	17	0	2	0	0	0	2	0
28	MF	(Russia) RUS	Andrey Arshavin	34	10	19+6	7	3+1	1	1	0	4	2
29	DF	(Trinidad and Tobago) TTO	Sheldon Bateau	17	0	14	0	1	0	0	0	2	0
30	GK	(Kazakhstan) KAZ	Oleg Grubov	1	0	1	0	0	0	0	0	0	0
51	GK	(Kazakhstan) KAZ	Vladimir Groshev	1	0	0+1	0	0	0	0	0	0	0
54	FW	(Kazakhstan) KAZ	Artur Shushenachev	1	0	0+1	0	0	0	0	0	0	0
57	DF	(Kazakhstan) KAZ	Aybol Abiken	5	1	0+4	1	0	0	0	0	0+1	0
58	MF	(Kazakhstan) KAZ	Aleksandr Sokolenko	7	0	3+3	0	0+1	0	0	0	0	0
63	FW	(Kazakhstan) KAZ	Magomed Paragulgov	9	1	7+1	1	1	0	0	0	0	0
Players away from Kairat on loan:
Players who left Kairat during the season:
8	MF	(Russia) RUS	Mikhail Bakayev	25	0	12+5	0	4	0	1	0	3	0

=== Goal scorers ===
Place	Position	Nation	Number	Name	Premier League	Kazakhstan Cup	Super Cup	Champions League	Total
1	FW	(Ivory Coast)	11	Gerard Gohou	24	3	0	4	31
2	MF	(Kazakhstan)	9	Bauyrzhan Islamkhan	11	1	0	0	12
3	MF	(Russia)	28	Andrey Arshavin	7	1	0	2	10
4	MF	(Croatia)	20	Ivo Iličević	4	2	0	3	9
5	MF	(Brazil)	10	Isael	8	0	0	0	8
6	MF	(Kazakhstan)	15	Bauyrzhan Turysbek	5	0	0	0	5
7	FW	(Norway)	21	Chuma Anene	4	0	0	0	4
8	DF	(Serbia)	6	Žarko Marković	2	0	0	0	2
8	DF	(Kazakhstan)	5	Gafurzhan Suyumbayev	2	0	0	0	2
8	MF	(Kazakhstan)	23	Georgy Zhukov	1	1	0	0	2
8	MF	(Kazakhstan)	7	Islambek Kuat	1	0	1	0	2
8	DF	(Spain)	14	César Arzo	1	0	1	0	2
8				Own goal	2	0	0	0	2
14	DF	(Kazakhstan)	4	Yeldos Akhmetov	1	0	0	0	1
14	FW	(Kazakhstan)	63	Magomed Paragulgov	1	0	0	0	1
14	DF	(Kazakhstan)	57	Aybol Abiken	1	0	0	0	1
				TOTALS	75	8	2	9	94

=== Disciplinary record ===
Number	Nation	Position	Name	Premier League		Kazakhstan Cup		Super Cup		Champions League		Total	
Number	Nation	Position	Name	Yellow card	Red card	Yellow card	Red card	Yellow card	Red card	Yellow card	Red card	Yellow card	Red card
1	(Kazakhstan)	GK	Vladimir Plotnikov	1	0	0	0	0	0	0	0	1	0
3	(Kazakhstan)	MF	Yan Vorogovskiy	1	0	0	0	0	0	0	0	1	0
4	(Kazakhstan)	DF	Yeldos Akhmetov	5	2	2	1	0	0	1	0	8	3
5	(Kazakhstan)	DF	Gafurzhan Suyumbayev	4	0	1	0	0	0	0	0	5	0
6	(Serbia)	DF	Žarko Marković	4	0	0	0	1	0	0	0	5	0
7	(Kazakhstan)	MF	Islambek Kuat	11	0	0	1	2	1	1	0	14	2
8	(Russia)	MF	Mikhail Bakayev	2	0	0	0	0	0	1	0	3	0
9	(Kazakhstan)	MF	Bauyrzhan Islamkhan	4	0	0	0	0	0	0	0	4	0
10	(Brazil)	MF	Isael	1	0	0	0	0	0	1	0	2	0
11	(Ivory Coast)	FW	Gerard Gohou	3	0	0	1	0	0	0	0	3	1
14	(Spain)	DF	César Arzo	7	1	0	0	0	0	0	1	7	2
15	(Kazakhstan)	MF	Bauyrzhan Turysbek	1	0	0	0	0	0	0	0	1	0
20	(Croatia)	MF	Ivo Iličević	0	0	0	0	0	0	1	0	1	0
21	(Norway)	FW	Chuma Anene	1	0	1	0	0	0	0	0	2	0
23	(Kazakhstan)	MF	Georgy Zhukov	3	0	1	0	0	0	0	0	4	0
25	(Hungary)	MF	Ákos Elek	2	0	1	0	0	0	1	0	4	0
27	(Kazakhstan)	GK	Stas Pokatilov	2	0	0	0	0	0	0	0	2	0
28	(Russia)	MF	Andrey Arshavin	5	0	0	0	1	0	0	0	6	0
29	(Trinidad and Tobago)	DF	Sheldon Bateau	2	0	0	0	0	0	0	0	2	0
57	(Kazakhstan)	DF	Aybol Abiken	0	0	0	0	0	0	1	0	1	0
58	(Kazakhstan)	MF	Aleksandr Sokolenko	4	1	0	0	0	0	0	0	4	1
			TOTALS	63	4	4	2	4	1	7	1	78	8
