= Gerard Gohou =

Association football player

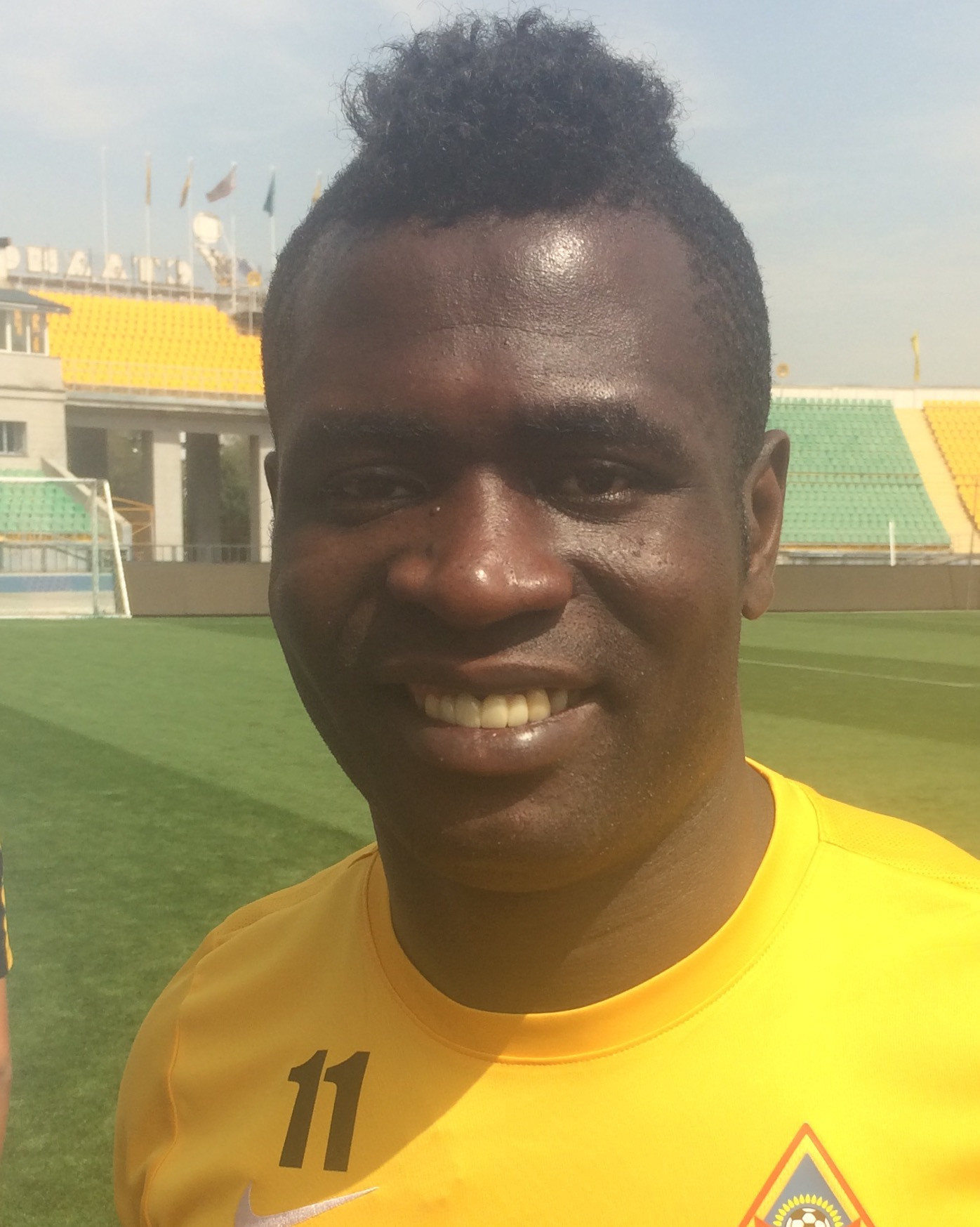
- Gohou with Kairat in 2017

Personal information
- Full name: Gerard Bi Goua Gohou
- Date of birth: 29 December 1988 (age 37)
- Place of birth: Gagnoa, Ivory Coast
- Height: 1.84 m (6 ft 0 in)
- Position: Striker

Team information
- Current team: Penang FC

Youth career
- 2004–2007: JC Abidjan

Senior career*
Years	Team	Apps	(Gls)
2007–2008	JC Abidjan	21	(14)
2008–2009	Hassania Agadir	28	(15)
2010–2011	Neuchâtel Xamax	41	(9)
2011–2012	Denizlispor	27	(7)
2012–2013	Kayseri Erciyesspor	31	(19)
2013–2014	Krasnodar	6	(1)
2014–2017	Kairat	102	(80)
2018–2019	Beijing Enterprises Group	48	(31)
2020–2021	Kasımpaşa	9	(0)
2022	Aktobe	21	(8)

International career
2010–2013	Ivory Coast U23	5	(3)
2022–	Rwanda	1	(0)
- * Club domestic league appearances and goals as of 30 January 2023

Gerard Bi Goua Gohou (born 29 December 1988) is a professional footballer who plays as a striker. Born in the Ivory Coast, he plays for the Rwanda national team.

== Club career ==
=== JC Abidjan ===
Gohou began his career 2004 with JC Abidjan and in 2008 appeared in the first team which played in the Ivory Coast's top tier. He served a total of four years with JC Abidjan.

=== Hassania Agadir ===
In summer 2008 Gohou signed for Moroccan club HUS d'Agadir. Gohou scored nine goals in 17 matches for the club.

=== Neuchâtel Xamax ===
On 15 February 2010, Swiss Super League club Neuchâtel Xamax announced the signing of Gohou. Shortly afterwards, Moroccan media suggested his contract with former side Hassania Agadir had not been terminated. On 27 February 2017, he arrived in Neuchâtel and was presented by his new club. Hassania Agadir contested the termination of the contract with Gohou and reported the case to FIFA. Moroccan authorities had arrested Gohou at the airport and held him in custody for three days before being acquitted of a theft charge, according to the player.

Gohou played the second half of the 2010–11 and after failing to score in the first ten matches, he scored a brace in the last match of his first season at the club.

He netted six goals in the first 13 league matches of the 2011–12 season. In the following 17 league matches he played he scored two goals.

Across one and a half seasons Gohou totalled nine goals in 41 league matches.

=== Denizlispor ===
In July 2011, Gohou joined Turkish second-tier side Denizlispor on a three-year contract.

=== FC Krasnodar ===
On 5 July 2013, Gohou signed a three-year contract with Russian Premier League club FC Krasnodar.

=== FC Kairat ===
On 24 June 2014, Krasnodar announced that Gohou had left the club to sign for FC Kairat of the Kazakhstan Premier League, on a six-month contract. On 30 July 2015, Gohou extended his stay at Kairat until December 2017.

On 13 November 2017, Kairat announced that Gohou would be leaving the club at the end of his contract.

=== Beijing Enterprises Group ===
On 5 February 2018, Gohou joined China League One club Beijing Enterprises Group.

=== Kasımpaşa ===
On 20 January 2020, Kasımpaşa announced the signing of Gohou on an initial 18-month contract, with the option of an additional two-years.

== International career ==
Gohou was born in the Ivory Coast and is of Ivorian descent. He was a member of the Ivory Coast national under-23 football team and scored twice on his debut on 20 May 2010 against Colombia national under-23 football team in the 2010 Toulon Tournament.

In 2017, Gohou was coached by Spanish manager Carlos Alós in Kazakhstani club FC Kairat. Five years later, the Spaniard took the Rwanda national team and contacted him to represent Rwanda. After being given a Rwandan passport, he was called up for a set of friendlies in September 2022. He debuted with Rwanda in a friendly 0–0 tie with Equatorial Guinea on 23 September 2022. He had previously rejected to represent Benin.

== Statistics ==
=== Club ===
As of match played 6 November 2022

Appearances and goals by club, season and competition
Club	Season	League			National cup (Note: Includes Swiss Cup, Russian Cup, Kazakhstan Cup)		Continental		Other		Total	
Club	Season	Division	Apps	Goals	Apps	Goals	Apps	Goals	Apps	Goals	Apps	Goals
Neuchâtel Xamax	2009–10	Swiss Super League	11	2	0	0	—		—		11	2
Neuchâtel Xamax	2010–11	Swiss Super League	30	7	4	0	—		—		34	7
Neuchâtel Xamax	Total		41	9	4	0	—		—		45	9
Denizlispor	2011–12	TFF 1. Lig	27	7	0	0	—		—		27	7
Erciyesspor	2012–13	TFF 1. Lig	31	19	0	0	—		—		31	19
Krasnodar	2013–14	Russian Premier League	6	1	1	1	—		—		7	2
Kairat	2014	Kazakhstan Premier League	13	12	3	2	4 (Note: Appearances in UEFA Europa League)	0	—		20	14
Kairat	2015	Kazakhstan Premier League	28	22	4	3	7	4	1 (Note: Appearance in Kazakhstan Super Cup)	0	40	29
Kairat	2016	Kazakhstan Premier League	29	22	3	0	4	3	1	0	37	25
Kairat	2017	Kazakhstan Premier League	32	24	3	3	4	4	1	0	40	31
Kairat	Total		102	80	14	9	19	11	3	0	137	99
Beijing Enterprises Group	2018	China League One	21	10	0	0	—		—		21	10
Beijing Enterprises Group	2019	China League One	27	21	0	0	—		—		27	21
Beijing Enterprises Group	Total		48	31	0	0	—		—		48	31
Kasımpaşa	2019–20	Süper Lig	8	0	0	0	—		—		8	0
Kasımpaşa	2020–21	Süper Lig	1	0	0	0	—		—		1	0
Kasımpaşa	Total		9	0	0	0	—		—		9	0
Aktobe	2022	Kazakhstan Premier League	21	8	3	0	—		—		24	8
Career total			285	155	21	9	19	11	3	0	328	175

== Honours ==
=== Club ===
FC Kairat

- Kazakhstan Cup: 2014, 2015, 2017
- Kazakhstan Super Cup: 2016, 2017

=== Individual ===
- Botola Top Scorer: 2008–09
- TFF First League Top Scorer: 2012–13
- Kazakhstan Premier League Top Scorer: 2015, 2016, 2017
