= Stanislav Lunin =

Kazakh footballer (1993–2021)

Personal information
- Full name: Stanislav Olegovich Lunin
- Date of birth: 2 May 1993
- Place of birth: Kazakhstan
- Date of death: 2 June 2021 (aged 28)
- Height: 1.80 m (5 ft 11 in)
- Position: Right-back

Senior career*
| Years | Team | Apps | (Gls) |
| 2011 | Vostok | 4 | (3) |
| 2012–2014 | Shakhter Karagandy | 40 | (3) |
| 2014–2018 | Kairat | 68 | (2) |
| 2019 | Irtysh Pavlodar | 4 | (0) |
| 2019 | Shakhter Karagandy | 4 | (0) |

International career^{‡}
| 2011 | Kazakhstan U19 | 3 | (0) |
| 2011–2014 | Kazakhstan U21 | 5 | (1) |
| 2014 | Kazakhstan | 2 | (0) |
- * Club domestic league appearances and goals as of 13:21, 10 May 2021 (UTC) ‡ National team caps and goals as of 21:55, 22 February 2015 (UTC)

Stanislav Olegovich Lunin (Russian: Станислав Олегович Лунин; 2 May 1993 – 2 June 2021), also known as Islam Dalaev, was a Kazakh professional footballer who played as a right-back.

== Career ==
On 20 June 2014, Lunin moved from Shakhter Karagandy to FC Kairat, on a 2.5-year contract. Lunin left Kairat on 29 December 2018 at the end of his contract.

On 29 December 2018, Lunin signed with Irtysh Pavlodar.

On 21 August 2019, Lunin returned to FC Shakhter Karagandy.

== Death ==
On 2 June 2021, Lunin died after a cardiac arrest.

== Career statistics ==
=== Club ===
As of match played 3 November 2019

Appearances and goals by club, season and competition
| Club | Season | League | | | National Cup | | Continental | | Other | | Total | |
| Club | Season | Division | Apps | Goals | Apps | Goals | Apps | Goals | Apps | Goals | Apps | Goals |
|---|---|---|---|---|---|---|---|---|---|---|---|---|
| Shakhter Karagandy | 2012 | Kazakhstan Premier League | 15 | 3 | 4 | 0 | 0 | 0 | 1 | 0 | 20 | 3 |
| Shakhter Karagandy | 2013 | Kazakhstan Premier League | 13 | 0 | 3 | 0 | 2 | 0 | 1 | 0 | 19 | 0 |
| Shakhter Karagandy | 2014 | Kazakhstan Premier League | 12 | 0 | 1 | 0 | 0 | 0 | 1 | 0 | 14 | 0 |
| Shakhter Karagandy | Total | | 40 | 3 | 8 | 0 | 2 | 0 | 3 | 0 | 53 | 3 |
| Kairat | 2014 | Kazakhstan Premier League | 15 | 0 | 3 | 0 | 3 | 0 | - | | 21 | 0 |
| Kairat | 2015 | Kazakhstan Premier League | 16 | 0 | 2 | 0 | 6 | 0 | 0 | 0 | 24 | 0 |
| Kairat | 2016 | Kazakhstan Premier League | 21 | 0 | 2 | 1 | 4 | 0 | 0 | 0 | 27 | 1 |
| Kairat | 2017 | Kazakhstan Premier League | 3 | 0 | 0 | 0 | 0 | 0 | 0 | 0 | 3 | 0 |
| Kairat | 2018 | Kazakhstan Premier League | 13 | 2 | 1 | 0 | 3 | 0 | 1 | 0 | 18 | 2 |
| Kairat | Total | | 68 | 2 | 8 | 1 | 16 | 0 | 1 | 0 | 93 | 3 |
| Irtysh Pavlodar | 2019 | Kazakhstan Premier League | 4 | 0 | 1 | 1 | - | | - | | 5 | 1 |
| Shakhter Karagandy | 2019 | Kazakhstan Premier League | 4 | 0 | 0 | 0 | - | | - | | 4 | 0 |
| Career total | | | 116 | 5 | 17 | 2 | 18 | 0 | 4 | 0 | 155 | 7 |

=== International ===
As of match played 16 November 2014

Appearances and goals by national team and year
| National team | Year | Apps | Goals |
|---|---|---|---|
| Kazakhstan | 2014 | 2 | 0 |
| Total | | 2 | 0 |

== Honours ==
Shakhter Karagandy

- Kazakhstan Premier League: 2012
- Kazakhstan Cup: 2013, 2014
- Kazakhstan Super Cup: 2013

Kairat

- Kazakhstan Cup: 2014, 2015, 2017
