= Sheldon Bateau =

Trinidadian footballer (born 1991)

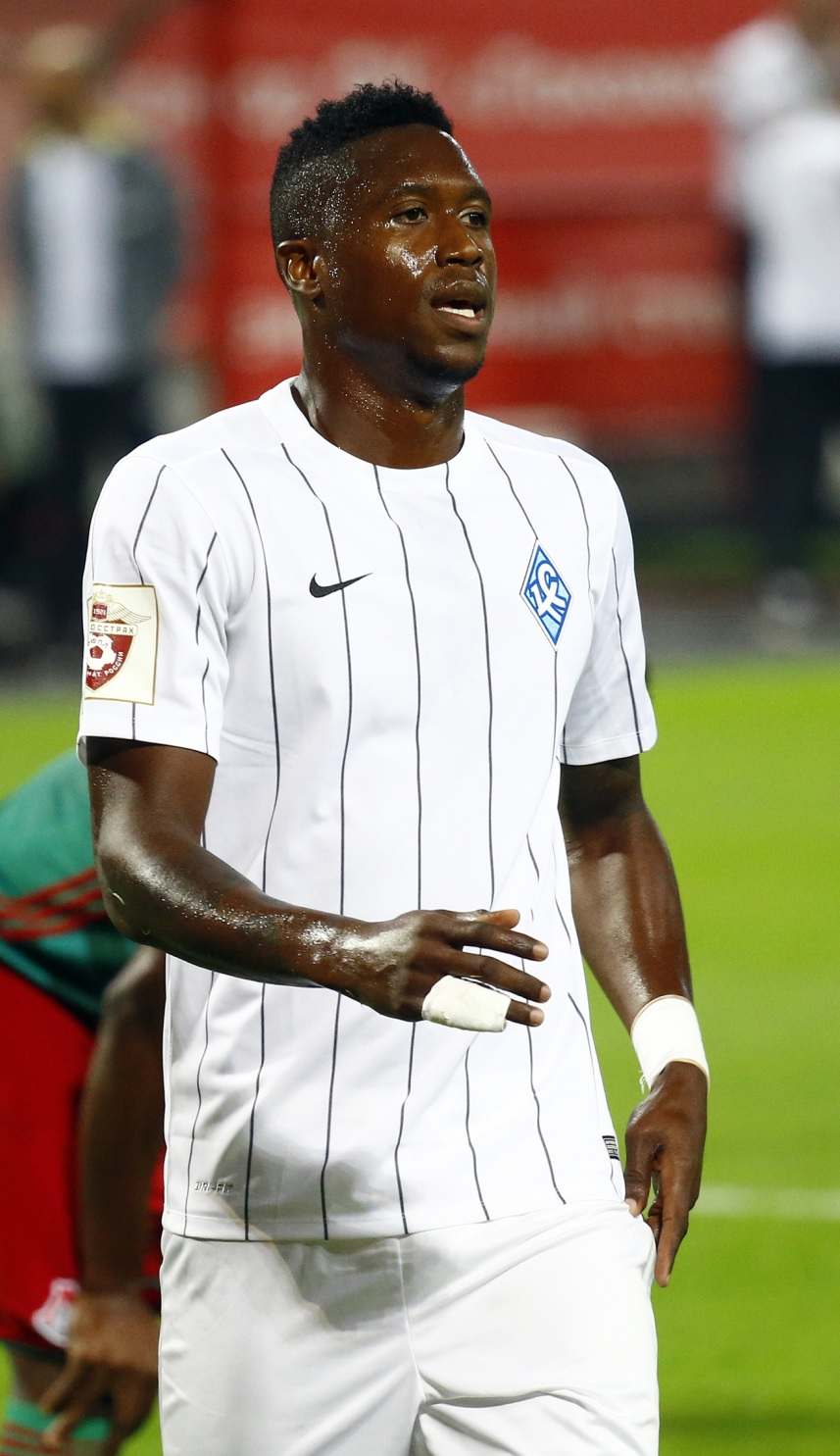
- Bateau with Krylia Sovetov in 2016

Personal information
- Full name: Sheldon Bateau
- Date of birth: 29 January 1991 (age 35)
- Place of birth: Port of Spain, Trinidad and Tobago
- Height: 1.86 m (6 ft 1 in)
- Position: Centre back

Team information
- Current team: Nakhon Si United

Youth career
- 2008: Fatima College
- 2008–2009: San Juan Jabloteh

Senior career*
Years	Team	Apps	(Gls)
2009–2012	San Juan Jabloteh	16	(4)
2012	North East Stars	0	(0)
2012–2016	K.V. Mechelen	79	(5)
2015–2016	→ Krylia Sovetov Samara (loan)	18	(0)
2016–2018	Krylia Sovetov Samara	20	(0)
2017–2018	→ Kairat (loan)	39	(0)
2019	Sarpsborg 08	13	(2)
2019–2022	K.V. Mechelen	36	(0)
2022–2023	Samsunspor	14	(0)
2022–2023	→ Beveren (loan)	32	(0)
2023–2025	Beveren	41	(3)
2025–2026	Defence Force	0	(0)
2026–	Nakhon Si United	0	(0)

International career^{‡}
2008–2011	Trinidad and Tobago U20	3	(0)
2011–2012	Trinidad and Tobago U23	9	(0)
2013–	Trinidad and Tobago	49	(4)
- * Club domestic league appearances and goals as of 20 April 2025 ‡ National team caps and goals as of 13 June 2023

Sheldon Bateau (born 29 January 1991) is a Trinidadian professional footballer who plays as a central defender for Thai League 3 club Nakhon Si United. Bateau represents the Trinidad and Tobago national team.

Bateau began his professional football career in 2009, at the age of 18, with San Juan Jabloteh in his native Trinidad and Tobago. After three seasons with the San Juan Kings, Bateau made a switch to fellow Pro League club North East Stars. However, Bateau later made a transfer after one month to K.V. Mechelen of the Belgian Pro League prior to the 2012–13 season.

== Club career ==
=== Early career ===
Bateau spent his early career in his native Trinidad and Tobago with San Juan Jabloteh of the TT Pro League. In his three seasons with the San Juan Kings, Bateau appeared in 16 matches and scored four goals. However, after the club dissolved due to financial difficulties following the 2011–12 season, Bateau switched to North East Stars.

In August 2012, before playing a match for his new club, Bateau received a trial with FC Twente of the Eredivisie. Since Bateau is not a European Union player, his salary became a block for a transfer to the Eredivisie club.

=== KV Mechelen ===
On 13 September 2012, Bateau signed a one-year contract with an option for two additional years with K.V. Mechelen of the Belgian Pro League. Sheldon made his league debut on 6 October coming on as a substitute in the 59th minute in a 0–2 defeat to Kortrijk.

On 31 October, Sheldon made his first start for the club against OH Leuven that resulted in a 1–3 loss. Afterwards, Bateau solidified a place in the starting line-up as a centre back and appeared in 11 league matches, including five consecutive starts, prior to the 2012–13 winter break. His consistent form resulted in Sheldon signing a two-year contract extension, on 18 January 2013, keeping him at Mechelen until the end of the 2014–15 season.

On 27 April, Bateau scored his first two league goals during a play-off match against Waasland-Beveren that provided his club a vital 2–0 win. Bateau concluded his first season in Belgium with 22 league appearances and two goals. Sheldon started the 2013–14 season as a regular in defence for Mechelen.

=== Kairat ===
On 27 June 2017, Bateau signed for Kazakhstan Premier League side FC Kairat on loan for the remainder of Kairat's 2017 season. On 29 December 2017, Krylia Sovetov Samara announced that they had agreed to extend Bateau's loan to Kairat for an additional year.

=== Sarpsborg 08 ===
On 14 February 2019, Sarpsborg 08 announced that they had signed Bateau for the 2019 season.

=== Samsunspor ===
On 9 January 2022, Bateau signed a 2.5-year contract with Samsunspor in Turkey.

=== SK Beveren ===
On 12 August 2022, Bateau joined Beveren on a one-year loan. He made his debut on the next day against Beerschot, coming off in the 75th minute for Derrick Tshimanga. On 21 July 2023, he moved to Beveren on a permanent basis and signed a two-year contract.

== International career ==
Bateau has been capped at under-17, under-20, under-23 Olympic team, and the Trinidad and Tobago national team.

Bateau made his debut for the Trinidad and Tobago national team on 6 February 2013 in a match against Peru playing the entire match which ended in a 0–2 loss for the Soca Warriors. On 5 September, Bateau made a substitute appearance in a 3–3 draw against the United Arab Emirates.

In the following match, Bateau started and led the Soca Warriors to a 3–1 win over Saudi Arabia to claim third place in the 2013 OSN Cup. Sheldon continued as a starter in Stephen Hart's back-line during the next two international matches against New Zealand and Jamaica.

On 4 June 2014, Bateau started in a 3–0 loss during a send-off series match for Argentina at Estadio Monumental prior to the 2014 FIFA World Cup. Four days later, Bateau made an additional start in centre defence before being replaced by Gavin Hoyte in the 72nd minute for the Soca Warriors in a 2–0 loss to Iran in Arena Corinthians.

== Career statistics ==
=== Club ===
As of match played 5 July 2019

Appearances and goals by club, season and competition
Club	Season	League			National Cup		League Cup		Continental		Other		Total	
Club	Season	Division	Apps	Goals	Apps	Goals	Apps	Goals	Apps	Goals	Apps	Goals	Apps	Goals
San Juan Jabloteh	2009	TT Pro League	5	2	0	0	–		1	0	4	0	10	2
San Juan Jabloteh	2010–11	TT Pro League	7	0	0	0	–		2	0	5	0	14	0
San Juan Jabloteh	2011–12	TT Pro League	4	2	0	0	–		0	0	0	0	4	2
San Juan Jabloteh	Total		16	4	0	0	-	-	3	0	9	0	28	4
North East Stars	2012–13	TT Pro League	0	0	0	0	–		–		–		0	0
K.V. Mechelen	2012–13	Jupiler Pro League	22	2	1	0	–		–		–		23	2
K.V. Mechelen	2013–14	Jupiler Pro League	35	1	0	0	–		–		–		35	1
K.V. Mechelen	2014–15	Jupiler Pro League	20	2	4	1	–		–		–		24	3
K.V. Mechelen	2015–16	Jupiler Pro League	2	0	0	0	–		–		–		2	0
K.V. Mechelen	Total		79	5	5	1	-	-	-	-	-	-	84	6
Krylia Sovetov Samara (loan)	2015–16	Russian Premier League	18	0	1	0	–		–		–		19	0
Krylia Sovetov Samara	2016–17	Russian Premier League	20	0	2	0	–		–		–		22	0
Krylia Sovetov Samara	2017–18	FNL	0	0	0	0	–		–		–		0	0
Krylia Sovetov Samara	2018–19	Russian Premier League	0	0	0	0	–		–		–		0	0
Krylia Sovetov Samara	Total		20	0	2	0	-	-	-	-	-	-	22	0
Kairat (loan)	2017	Kazakhstan Premier League	14	0	1	0	–		2	0	0	0	17	0
Kairat (loan)	2018	Kazakhstan Premier League	25	0	0	0	–		5	0	1	0	31	0
Kairat (loan)	Total		39	0	1	0	-	-	7	0	1	0	48	0
Sarpsborg 08	2019	Eliteserien	13	2	3	0	–		–		–		16	2
Sarpsborg 08	Total		13	2	3	0	-	-	-	-	-	-	16	2
Career total			185	11	12	1	-	-	10	0	10	0	217	12

=== International ===
Updated 25 March 2021

National team	Year	Friendly		Competitive		Total	
National team	Year	Apps	Goals	Apps	Goals	Apps	Goals
Trinidad and Tobago	2013	5	0	0	0	5	0
Trinidad and Tobago	2014	2	0	3	0	5	0
Trinidad and Tobago	2015	4	0	6	2	10	2
Trinidad and Tobago	2016	0	0	7	1	7	1
Trinidad and Tobago	2017	1	0	4	0	5	0
Trinidad and Tobago	2018	3	0	0	0	3	0
Trinidad and Tobago	2019	3	0	4	0	7	0
Trinidad and Tobago	2020	0	0	0	0	0	0
Trinidad and Tobago	2021	0	0	1	1	1	1
Total		18	0	25	4	43	4

=== International goals ===
Scores and results list Trinidad and Tobago's goal tally first.

No.	Date	Venue	Opponent	Score	Result	Competition
1.	9 July 2015	Soldier Field, Chicago, United States	Guatemala	1–0	3–1	2015 CONCACAF Gold Cup
2.	12 July 2015	University of Phoenix Stadium, Glendale, United States	Cuba	1–0	2–0	2015 CONCACAF Gold Cup
3.	29 March 2016	Hasely Crawford Stadium, Port of Spain, Trinidad and Tobago	Saint Vincent and the Grenadines	1–0	6–0	2018 FIFA World Cup qualification
4.	25 March 2021	Estadio Panamericano, San Cristóbal, Dominican Republic	Guyana	2–0	3–0	2022 FIFA World Cup qualification
