= Magomed Paragulgov =

Kazakh footballer

Personal information
- Full name: Magomed Abukarovich Paragulgov
- Date of birth: 26 March 1994 (age 32)
- Place of birth: Almaty, Kazakhstan
- Height: 1.86 m (6 ft 1 in)
- Position: Midfielder

Youth career
- Rupel Boom
- Royal Antwerp
- Alma-Ata
- 2009–2012: Olé Brasil
- 2012–2014: Kairat

Senior career*
Years	Team	Apps	(Gls)
2014–2015	Kairat II		
2015–2019	Kairat	25	(4)
2015	→ Spartak Semey (loan)	6	(1)
2019	→ Irtysh (loan)	24	(0)
2020	Kaisar	2	(0)
2020–2021	Ermis Aradippou	7	(0)
2021	Akzhayik	4	(0)
2021	Torpedo Kutaisi	8	(0)
2022	Atyrau	7	(0)

International career^{‡}
2018–	Kazakhstan	2	(0)
- * Club domestic league appearances and goals as of 22 February 2024 ‡ National team caps and goals as of 26 March 2018

Magomed Abukarovich Paragulgov (Russian: Магомед Абукарович Парагульгов; born 26 March 1994) is a Kazakh footballer. Besides Kazakhstan, he has played in Brazil, Cyprus and Georgia.

== Career ==
=== Club ===
On 27 February 2019, Irtysh Pavlodar announced the signing of Paragulgov.

17 February 2020, FC Kaisar announced the signing of Paragulgov.

== Career statistics ==
=== Club ===
As of match played 26 June 2022

Club	Season	League			National Cup		Continental		Other		Total	
Club	Season	Division	Apps	Goals	Apps	Goals	Apps	Goals	Apps	Goals	Apps	Goals
Kairat	2012	Kazakhstan Premier League	0	0	0	0	–		–		0	0
Kairat	2013	Kazakhstan Premier League	0	0	0	0	–		–		0	0
Kairat	2014	Kazakhstan Premier League	0	0	0	0	0	0	–		0	0
Kairat	2015	Kazakhstan Premier League	0	0	0	0	0	0	0	0	0	0
Kairat	2016	Kazakhstan Premier League	0	0	0	0	0	0	0	0	0	0
Kairat	2017	Kazakhstan Premier League	8	1	1	0	0	0	0	0	9	1
Kairat	2018	Kazakhstan Premier League	17	3	4	1	2	0	1	0	24	4
Kairat	2019	Kazakhstan Premier League	0	0	0	0	0	0	0	0	0	0
Kairat	Total		25	4	5	0	2	0	1	0	33	5
Spartak Semey (loan)	2015	Kazakhstan First Division	6	1	0	0	–		–		6	1
Irtysh Pavlodar (loan)	2019	Kazakhstan Premier League	24	0	2	1	–		–		26	1
Kaisar	2020	Kazakhstan Premier League	2	0	0	0	–		1	0	3	0
Ermis Aradippou	2020–21	Cypriot First Division	3	0	0	0	–		–		3	0
Akzhayik	2021	Kazakhstan Premier League	4	0	0	0	–		–		4	0
Torpedo Kutaisi	2021	Erovnuli Liga	8	0	0	0	–		–		8	0
Atyrau	2022	Kazakhstan Premier League	7	0	0	0	–		–		7	0
Career total			79	5	7	1	2	0	2	0	90	7

=== International ===
Kazakhstan national team
Year	Apps	Goals
2018	2	0
Total	2	0

Statistics accurate as of match played 26 March 2018
