= Yeldos Akhmetov =

Kazakh footballer

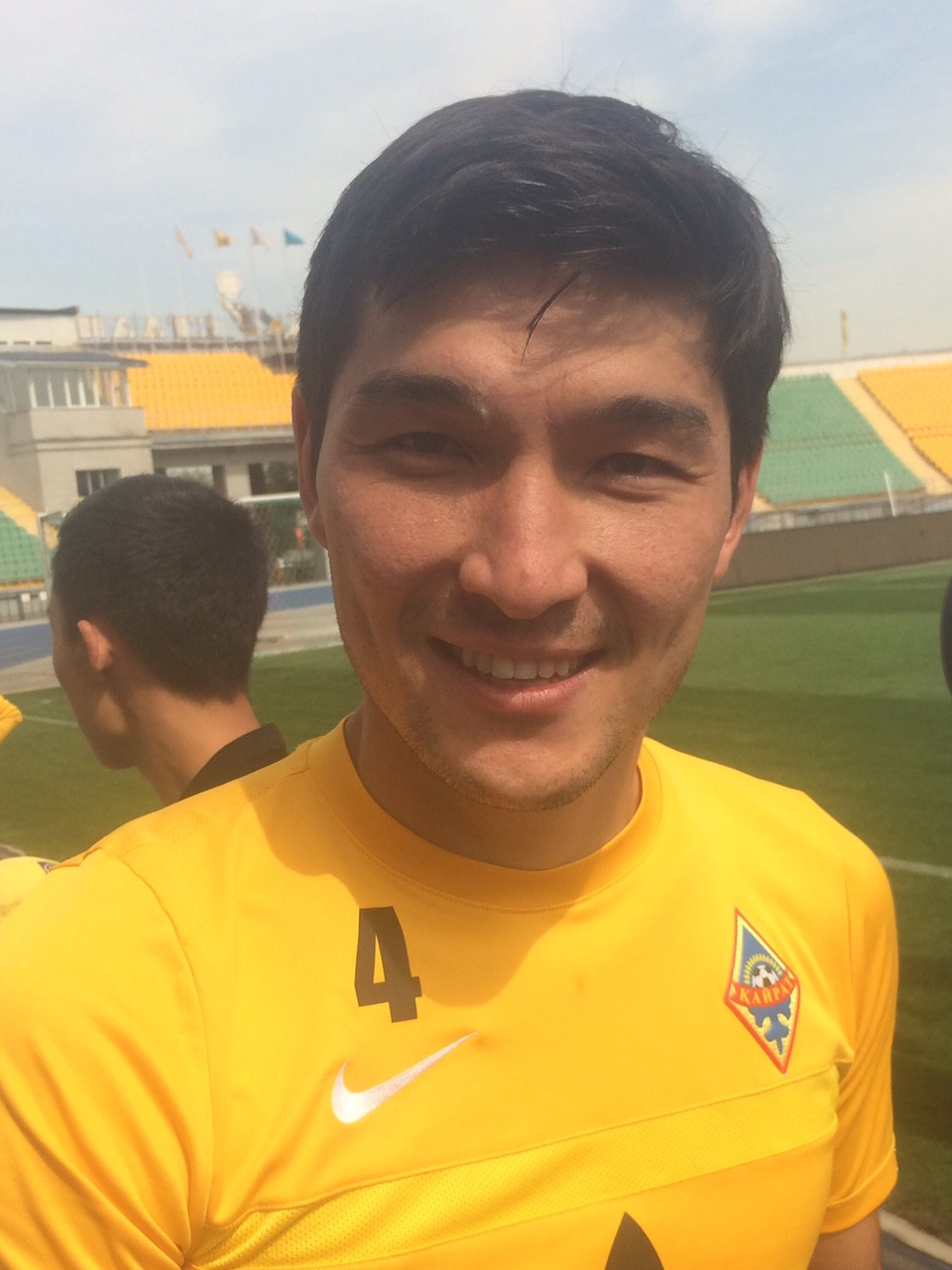
- Akhmetov in September 2017

Personal information
- Full name: Yeldos Kuanyshuly Akhmetov
- Date of birth: 1 June 1990 (age 36)
- Place of birth: Taraz, Kazakhstan
- Height: 1.85 m (6 ft 1 in)
- Position: Defender

Team information
- Current team: Kazakhstan (interim coach)

Senior career*
Years	Team	Apps	(Gls)
2009–2011	Irtysh Pavlodar	55	(0)
2012–2013	Taraz	17	(0)
2013–2015	Astana	29	(1)
2016	Irtysh Pavlodar	23	(4)
2016–2019	Kairat	41	(1)
2020–2021	Kaisar	3	(0)
2021–2023	Taraz	37	(2)
2023–	Aksu	7	(0)

International career^{‡}
2010–2012	Kazakhstan U21	11	(1)
2012–2022	Kazakhstan	17	(0)

Managerial career
- 2025–: Kazakhstan (interim coach)
- * Club domestic league appearances and goals as of 6 July 2023 ‡ National team caps and goals as of 17 April 2023

Yeldos Kuanyshuly Akhmetov (Kazakh: Елдос Қуанышұлы Ахметов, Eldos Quanyşūly Ahmetov; born 1 June 1990) is a Kazakh football coach and former player who played as a defender is the current interim coach of the Kazakhstan national team.

== Career ==
On 18 November 2016, Akhmetov signed a three-year contract with Kairat. On 11 January 2020, Kaisar announced the signing of Akhmetov.

== Career statistics ==
=== Club ===
As of match played 17 October 2020

Appearances and goals by club, season and competition
Club	Season	League			National Cup		Continental		Other		Total	
Club	Season	Division	Apps	Goals	Apps	Goals	Apps	Goals	Apps	Goals	Apps	Goals
Irtysh Pavlodar	2009	Premier League	7	0	—		—		—		7	0
Irtysh Pavlodar	2010	Premier League	22	0	—		—		—		22	0
Irtysh Pavlodar	2011	Premier League	23	0	2	0	—		—		25	0
Irtysh Pavlodar	Total		52	0	2	0	—	—	—	—	54	0
Taraz	2012	Premier League	7	0	1	0	—		—		8	0
Taraz	2013	Premier League	3	0	1	0	—		—		4	0
Taraz	Total		10	0	2	0	—	—	—	—	12	0
Astana	2013	Premier League	9	1	0	0	0	0	0	0	9	1
Astana	2014	Premier League	13	0	3	0	4	0	—		20	0
Astana	2015	Premier League	16	0	4	0	1	0	0	0	21	0
Astana	Total		38	1	7	0	5	0	0	0	50	1
Irtysh Pavlodar	2016	Premier League	23	4	2	0	—		—		25	4
Kairat	2017	Premier League	23	1	4	0	3	0	1	0	31	1
Kairat	2018	Premier League	11	0	2	0	0	0	0	0	13	0
Kairat	2019	Premier League	7	0	1	0	4	0	1	0	13	0
Kairat	Total		41	1	7	0	7	0	2	0	57	1
Kaisar	2020	Premier League	3	0	0	0	0	0	0	0	3	0
Career total			167	6	20	0	12	0	2	0	201	6

=== International ===
Kazakhstan
Year	Apps	Goals
2012	1	0
2013	0	0
2014	0	0
2015	0	0
2016	6	0
Total	7	0

Statistics accurate as of match played 11 November 2016
