= Ákos Elek =

Hungarian footballer

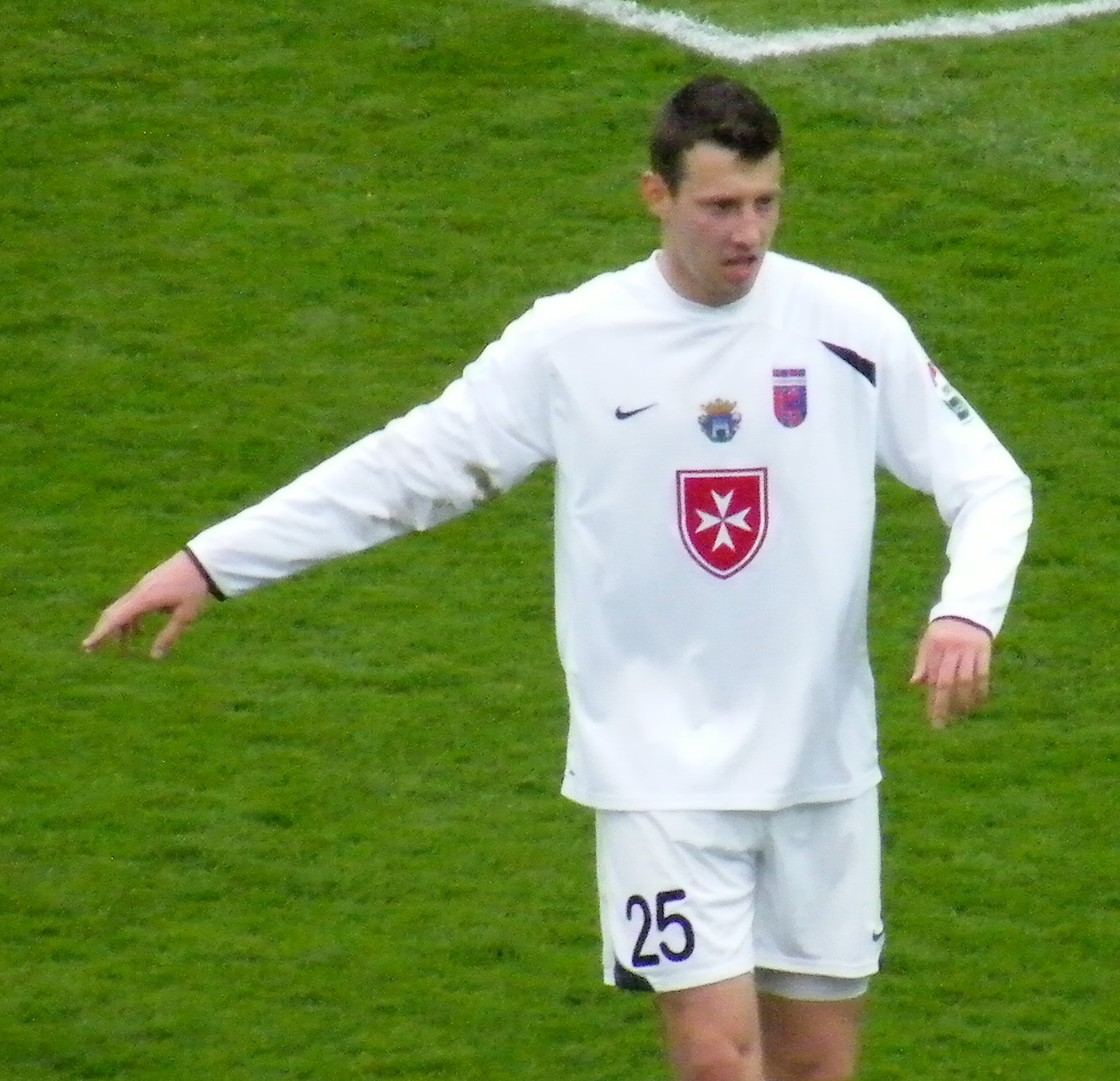
- Elek playing for Videoton in 2010

Personal information
- Date of birth: 21 July 1988 (age 38)
- Place of birth: Ózd, Hungary
- Height: 1.91 m (6 ft 3 in)
- Position: Defensive midfielder

Youth career
- Putnok
- 2003–2005: Kazincbarcika

Senior career*
Years	Team	Apps	(Gls)
2004–2008	Kazincbarcika	64	(13)
2008–2012	Videoton	78	(10)
2012	→ Eskişehirspor (loan)	3	(0)
2012–2015	Diósgyőr	67	(5)
2015	Changchun Yatai	28	(2)
2016–2017	Diósgyőr	29	(5)
2017–2018	Kairat	50	(1)
2019–2021	Fehérvár	35	(1)
2020	→ Fehérvár II	3	(0)

International career^{‡}
2009–2010	Hungary U21	2	(0)
2010–2018	Hungary	48	(1)
- * Club domestic league appearances and goals as of 26 February 2021 ‡ National team caps and goals as of 25 September 2026

Ákos Elek (born 21 July 1988) is a retired Hungarian professional footballer who played as a defensive midfielder for last time un MOL Vidi FC in the Nemzeti Bajnokság I.

== Club career ==
=== Kazincbarcika ===
Elek started his career in the Kazincbarcikai SC in 2005. The team played in the Hungarian Second Division. He scored his only goal against Makó FC.

=== Videoton FC ===
In 2008 Elek signed a contract with the Videoton FC. He played his first match against Siófok on 26 July 2006. In 2010-11 Nemzeti Bajnokság I Elek won the Hungarian League with his club.

=== Diósgyőr ===
On 25 July 2012, Elek was signed by Hungarian League club Diósgyőr.

=== Changchun Yatai ===
On 18 January 2015, Elek signed a two-year contract with Changchun Yatai F.C.

=== Kairat ===
On 8 March 2017, Kairat announced the singing of Elek on a two-year contract, with the option of an additional third year.

=== MOL Vidi ===
On 8 January 2019, Elek returned to MOL Vidi FC.

== International career ==
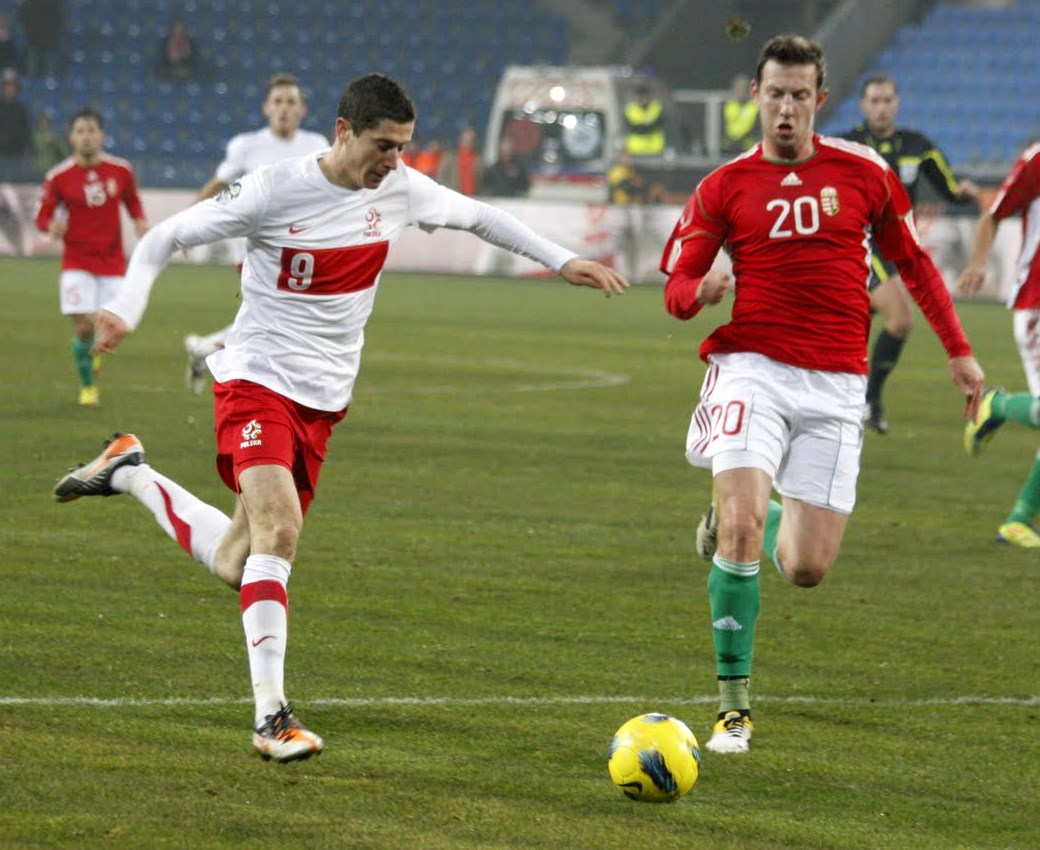
Elek playing for Hungary against Poland

Being a permanent member of his club in Videoton Elek was invited to join the Hungary national team by Hungarian coach Sándor Egervári. Elek scored his first international goal against Iceland at the Puskás Ferenc Stadium. The match finished 4–0.

Elek was selected for Hungary's Euro 2016 squad.

He played in the last group match in a 3–3 draw against Portugal at the Parc Olympique Lyonnais, Lyon on 22 June 2016.

== Career statistics ==
=== Club ===
As of match played 20 June 2020

Appearances and goals by club, season and competition
Club	Season	League			National Cup		League Cup		Continental		Other		Total	
Club	Season	Division	Apps	Goals	Apps	Goals	Apps	Goals	Apps	Goals	Apps	Goals	Apps	Goals
Fehérvár/Videoton	2008–09	Nemzeti Bajnokság I	11	0					–		–		11	0
Fehérvár/Videoton	2009–10	Nemzeti Bajnokság I	28	5	2	0			–		–		30	5
Fehérvár/Videoton	2010–11	Nemzeti Bajnokság I	26	4	3	1	2	0	2	0	1	0	34	5
Fehérvár/Videoton	2011–12	Nemzeti Bajnokság I	13	1	1	0	1	0	2	1	–		17	2
Fehérvár/Videoton	Total		78	10	6	1	3	0	4	1	1	0	97	12
Eskişehirspor (loan)	2011–12	Süper Lig	3	0	0	0	–		–		–		3	0
Diósgyőri	2012–13	Nemzeti Bajnokság I	27	1	2	0	0	0	–		–		29	1
Diósgyőri	2013–14	Nemzeti Bajnokság I	25	3	8	1	2	0	–		–		35	4
Diósgyőri	2014–15	Nemzeti Bajnokság I	15	1	1	0	1	0	5	1	–		22	2
Diósgyőri	Total		67	5	11	1	3	0	5	1	-	-	86	7
Changchun Yatai	2015	Chinese Super League	28	2			–		–		–		28	2
Diósgyőri	2015–16	Nemzeti Bajnokság I	11	4	0	0	–		–		–		11	4
Diósgyőri	2016–17	Nemzeti Bajnokság I	18	1	2	0	–		–		–		20	1
Diósgyőri	Total		29	5	2	0	-	-	-	-	-	-	31	5
Kairat	2017	Kazakhstan Premier League	28	0	3	0	–		4	0	0	0	35	0
Kairat	2018	Kazakhstan Premier League	22	1	0	0	–		5	0	1	0	28	1
Kairat	Total		50	1	3	0	-	-	9	0	1	0	63	1
Fehérvár	2018–19	Nemzeti Bajnokság I	12	0	4	1	–		0	0	0	0	16	1
Fehérvár	2019–20	Nemzeti Bajnokság I	23	1	6	0	–		4	0	0	0	33	1
Fehérvár	Total		35	1	10	1	-	-	4	0	-	-	49	2
Career total			290	24	32	3	6	0	22	2	2	0	352	29

=== International ===
As of match played 6 June 2018

Appearances and goals by national team and year
National team	Year	Apps	Goals
Hungary	2010	7	0
Hungary	2011	10	1
Hungary	2012	7	0
Hungary	2013	5	0
Hungary	2014	3	0
Hungary	2015	6	0
Hungary	2016	5	0
Hungary	2017	3	0
Hungary	2018	3	0
Total		49	1

Scores and results list Hungary's goal tally first, score column indicates score after each Elek goal.

List of international goals scored by Ákos Elek
No.	Date	Venue	Opponent	Score	Result	Competition
1	10 August 2011	Puskas Ferenc Stadium, Budapest	Iceland	4–0	4–0	Friendly

== Honours ==
Videoton

- Nemzeti Bajnokság I: 2010–11
- Hungarian Cup: 2018-19

Diósgyőr

- Hungarian League Cup: 2013–14

Individual

- Nemzeti Sport Team of the Season: 2009–10, 2010–11 Autumn Season, 2010–11, 2014–15 Autumn Season
