= Hugo Silveira =

Uruguayan footballer (born 1993)

Personal information
- Full name: Hugo Gabriel Silveira Pereira
- Date of birth: 23 May 1993 (age 33)
- Place of birth: Montevideo, Uruguay
- Height: 1.87 m (6 ft 1 1/2 in)
- Position: Forward

Team information
- Current team: Racing de Montevideo
- Number: 9

Youth career
- –2013: Cerro

Senior career*
Years	Team	Apps	(Gls)
2013–2016	Cerro	65	(18)
2016–2018	Nacional	43	(9)
2018	→ Kairat (loan)	15	(4)
2018–2019	Tigre	7	(3)
2019–2020	Patronato	10	(2)
2020–2021	Querétaro	29	(9)
2021	Ñublense	8	(0)
2022	Rentistas	24	(7)
2023–2024	Cerro Largo	46	(15)
2024–	Racing de Montevideo	16	(1)
- * Club domestic league appearances and goals as of 1 October 2025

Hugo Gabriel Silveira Pereira (born 23 May 1993) is a Uruguayan footballer who plays for Racing de Montevideo as a forward.

== Career ==
=== Club ===
On 13 February 2018, FC Kairat announced the signing of Silveira on a season-long loan deal.

== Career statistics ==
=== Club ===
As of match played 11 December 2018

Club	Season	League			National Cup		Continental		Other		Total	
Club	Season	Division	Apps	Goals	Apps	Goals	Apps	Goals	Apps	Goals	Apps	Goals
Cerro	2012–13	Primera División	6	0	–		–		–		6	0
Cerro	2013–14	Primera División	28	6	–		–		–		28	6
Cerro	2014–15	Primera División	26	7	–		–		–		26	7
Cerro	2015–16	Primera División	25	5	–		–		–		25	5
Cerro	Total		65	18	-	-	-	-	-	-	65	18
Nacional	2016	Primera División	14	2	–		0	0	–		14	2
Nacional	2017	Primera División	29	7	–		8	2	–		37	9
Nacional	2018	Primera División	0	0	–		0	0	0	0	0	0
Nacional	Total		43	9	-	-	8	2	0	0	51	11
Kairat (loan)	2018	Kazakhstan Premier League	15	4	0	0	0	0	1	0	16	4
Tigre	2018–19	Superliga Argentina	2	1	0	0	–		–		2	1
Career total			125	32	-	-	8	2	1	0	134	34
