= Carlos Alós =

Spanish footballer and manager

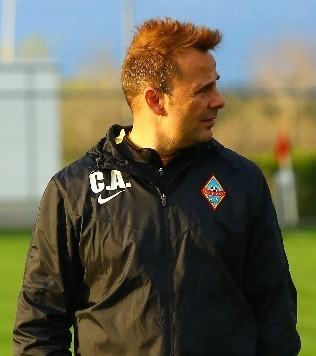
- Alós with Kairat in 2017

Personal information
- Full name: Carlos Alós Ferrer
- Date of birth: 21 July 1975 (age 51)
- Place of birth: Tortosa, Spain
- Position: Goalkeeper

Youth career
- Perelló
- Tortosa

Senior career*
Years	Team	Apps	(Gls)
1993–1995	Tortosa		
1995–1996	La Sénia		
1996–1997	Alavés B		
1997–1998	Don Benito		
1998–2001	Tortosa		
2001–2003	Amposta		
2003–2005	Remolins-Bítem		
2005–2007	Roquetenc		
2007–2008	Jesús Catalonia		

Managerial career
- 2003–2005: Amposta (youth)
- 2005–2007: Roquetenc (player-manager)
- 2008–2009: Tortosa
- 2010–2011: Kitchee (assistant)
- 2015: Pogoń Siedlce
- 2017: Kazakhstan U17
- 2017–2018: Kairat
- 2019: FAR Rabat
- 2019: Qatar SC
- 2020–2021: Enosis Neon Paralimni
- 2022–2023: Rwanda
- 2023–2025: Belarus
- 2026: Juventud Torremolinos
- * Club domestic league appearances and goals

Carlos Alós Ferrer (born 21 July 1975) is a Spanish professional football manager and former player.

== Playing career ==
Alós was born in Tortosa, Tarragona, Spain, and started his career with his hometown club CD Tortosa in 1993. A goalkeeper, he never appeared in any higher than Tercera División during his playing days, representing CF La Sénia, Deportivo Alavés B, CD Don Benito, Tortosa, CF Amposta, UE Remolins-Bítem, CD Roquetenc and CF Jesús Catalonia, retiring with the latter in 2008 at the age of 33.

== Managerial career ==
Alós started his managerial career in 2003, with CF Amposta's youth categories. In 2005 he was named player-manager at Roquetenc, achieving promotion from Primera Regional in his second season.

In 2008, Alós was appointed manager of another club he represented as a player, Tortosa, but resigned on 11 February of the following year and immediately joined the club's board. In January 2010, he moved abroad for the first time in his career, joining Hong Kong Premier League side Kitchee SC as Josep Gombau's assistant.

Alós left Hong Kong in 2011 and joined Escola Varsovia, FC Barcelona's academy in Warsaw, Poland. On 16 January 2015, he took over Pogoń Siedlce in the same country, but left the club in May.

In August 2015, Alós moved to Kazakhstan, helping the national team in their project of development of youth football before being appointed manager of the under-17s in January 2017. On 26 July of that year, he was announced as the new manager of FC Kairat, agreeing a deal until the end of the season.

Alós extended his contract with Kairat for another two years on 28 November 2017. He left by mutual consent the following 15 October.

On 20 January 2019, Alós was appointed FAR Rabat manager. He left by mutual accord on 10 June, only a month after signing a two-year extension, with the team from the capital city having finished 13th.

Qatar SC signed Alós on a two-year deal on 14 June 2019. He was replaced by Wesam Rizik during the first half of the season, due to poor form.

Alós was hired by Enosis Neon Paralimni FC of the Cypriot First Division in September 2020, starting at a team with no points from four games.

In March 2022, Alós was appointed manager of Rwanda. He resigned on 8 August 2023 after failing to qualify for the 2023 Africa Cup of Nations following a 2–0 loss to Mozambique, and took charge of Belarus the same day. His debut on 9 September was a goalless draw away to Andorra in UEFA Euro 2024 qualification.

== Manager statistics ==
As of match played 10 May 2026

Managerial record by team and tenure
Team	Nat	From	To	Record								Ref
Team	Nat	From	To	G	W	D	L	GF	GA	GD	Win %	Ref
Roquetenc	(Spain)	1 July 2005	30 June 2007	68	40	12	16	137	72	+65	58.82	
Tortosa	(Spain)	1 July 2008	11 February 2009	23	7	3	13	25	30	−5	30.43	
Pogoń Siedlce	(Poland)	9 January 2015	12 May 2015	10	1	2	7	7	19	−12	10.00	
Kairat	(Kazakhstan)	26 July 2017	16 October 2018	52	36	5	11	111	53	+58	69.23	
FAR Rabat	(Morocco)	21 January 2019	10 June 2019	16	4	6	6	18	19	−1	25.00	
Qatar SC	(Qatar)	14 June 2019	22 September 2019	4	0	0	4	2	8	−6	0.00	
Paralimni	(Cyprus)	21 September 2020	26 March 2021	27	7	6	14	25	40	−15	25.93	
Rwanda	(Rwanda)	29 March 2022	7 August 2023	7	0	4	3	3	7	−4	0.00	
Belarus	(Belarus)	8 August 2023	4 December 2025	26	6	10	10	24	40	−16	23.08	
Juventud Torremolinos	(Spain)	9 April 2026	Present	5	2	1	2	6	5	+1	40.00	
Total				238	103	49	86	358	293	+65	43.28	—

== Honours ==
=== Manager ===
Kairat

- Kazakhstan Cup: 2017
