= Ivo Iličević =

Croatian footballer (born 1986)

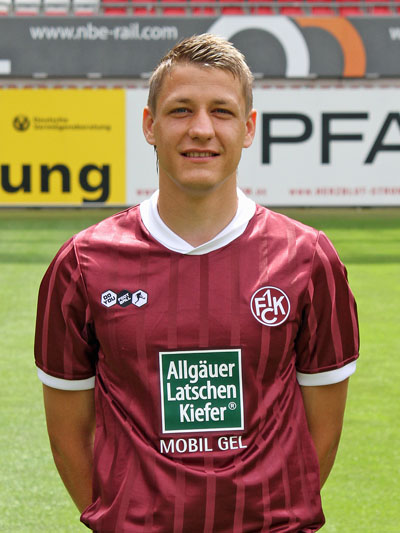
- Iličević in 2010

Personal information
- Date of birth: 14 November 1986 (age 39)
- Place of birth: Aschaffenburg, West Germany
- Height: 1.74 m (5 ft 9 in)
- Position: Winger

Youth career
- 1994–1996: 1. FC Südring Aschaffenburg
- 1996–2004: Viktoria Aschaffenburg

Senior career*
Years	Team	Apps	(Gls)
2004–2006	Darmstadt 98	44	(8)
2006–2008	VfL Bochum II	12	(7)
2006–2010	VfL Bochum	25	(2)
2008–2009	→ Greuther Fürth (loan)	38	(4)
2009–2010	→ 1. FC Kaiserslautern (loan)	30	(4)
2010–2011	1. FC Kaiserslautern	25	(6)
2011–2016	Hamburger SV	89	(11)
2016–2017	Anzhi Makhachkala	12	(2)
2017–2018	Kairat	32	(7)
2019	1. FC Nürnberg	3	(0)
Total		310	(53)

International career
2007–2008	Croatia U21	11	(5)
2010–2013	Croatia	8	(1)
- * Club domestic league appearances and goals

Ivo Iličević (born 14 November 1986) is a retired professional footballer. Born in Germany, he represented Croatia at international level.

== Club career ==
=== Early days ===
Iličević was born in Aschaffenburg, West Germany to Bosnian Croat parents. His father emigrated to West Germany from a small village near Odžak, Bosnia and Herzegovina, then part of the SFR Yugoslavia). He began his career in the youth ranks of Viktoria Aschaffenburg, before joining Regionalliga Süd side Darmstadt 98 in January 2005. At the club, he quickly became a first-team regular under former Bundesliga star Bruno Labbadia and scored eight goals in 44 league matches. As a youth-team player, he played as a forward, but later became mainly deployed as an attacking midfielder.

=== VfL Bochum ===
In the summer of 2006, Iličević joined Bundesliga side VfL Bochum and made his top-flight debut in the club's opening match of the 2006–07 league season, a 2–1 defeat at Mainz 05 on 12 August 2006. On 24 September 2006, he scored his first Bundesliga goal, netting the match-winning goal in a 2–1 win at home to Arminia Bielefeld. He made a total of 19 Bundesliga appearances in his first season with Bochum, scoring two goals.

In January 2008, he was loaned to Greuther Fürth of the 2. Bundesliga, after making just six Bundesliga appearances (without scoring a goal) with Bochum in the first half of the 2007–08 league season. He went on to spend a season and a half with Greuther Fürth, scoring 4 goals in 38 league appearances.

=== 1. FC Kaiserslautern ===
In the summer of 2009, Bochum loaned Iličević to another 2. Bundesliga side, 1. FC Kaiserslautern, for the entire 2009–10 season. He scored 4 goals in 30 league appearances, helping the team to secure promotion to the Bundesliga for the 2010–11 season. He eventually signed a contract with Kaiserslautern in the summer of 2010.

He had a great start to the 2010–11 Bundesliga season with Kaiserslautern, scoring two goals and recording two assists in the club's opening two matches, a 3–1 win at 1. FC Köln and a 2–0 win at home to Bayern Munich. In November 2010, he scored a goal in three consecutive Bundesliga matches. On 20 November 2010, he participated in all of his team's three goals in a 3–1 win at 1. FC Nürnberg, scoring their second goal and setting up the remaining two.

=== Hamburger SV ===
On 31 August 2011, on the last day of summer transfer window, Iličević signed a four-year contract with Hamburger SV. He made his debut for Hamburg in a match against SC Freiburg coming in as a substitute in 66th minute. He scored his first goal only seven minutes later by scoring a winning goal for Hamburg. In his first season, his playing period was not consistent due to various injuries, including a torn muscle. He made 18 appearances and scored two goals.

In the 2012–13 season, he suffered a hamstring injury in the match against Hannover 96 at the end of September 2012 which sidelined him for almost seven weeks. After recovery, Iličević made his comeback 15 December 2012 (matchday 17) in the match against Bayer Leverkusen (0–3). In the second part of the season, he was sidelined due to a stomach muscle injury for more than ten weeks. Due to all these injuries, the season was disappointing for Iličević, as he made only eight appearances and scored one goal.

Previously, he worn kit number 11 for Hamburg, but after Ivica Olić's departure from the club, he changed his number to 7. Number 11 was then handed back to Olić when he returned for a second stint with the club.

=== Anzhi Makhachkala ===
On 24 August 2016, Iličević signed a three-year contract with the Russian side FC Anzhi Makhachkala.

=== Kairat ===
On 30 January 2017, FC Kairat announced the signing of Iličević on a two-year contract, with the option of an additional year.

=== 1. FC Nürnberg ===
On 30 January 2019, Iličević returned to Germany, joining 1. FC Nürnberg on a short-term deal. He left at the end of the season.

== International career ==
In May 2007, Iličević received his first call-up to the Croatia national under-21 team, made his international U21 debut on 2 June 2007 in a 2–0 win against the Faroe Islands in Varaždin. In his second appearance for the team, on 6 June 2007, he scored a brace to help them to a 3–2 win against Greece in Zaprešić. He won a total of 11 international caps and scored five goals for the Croatian U21s, with his last appearance coming on 9 September 2008 in a 1–1 draw against Italy in Varaždin.

On 29 September 2008, he received his first full international call-up for Croatia's 2010 FIFA World Cup qualifiers against Ukraine and Andorra the following October, but did not feature in any of the two matches.

He eventually made his full international debut on 12 October 2010, coming on as a half-time substitute for Luka Modrić in a friendly match against Norway in Zagreb, which Croatia won 2–1. On 17 November 2010, he made his competitive debut in a 3–0 win at home to Malta in the UEFA Euro 2012 qualifying, replacing Ivan Rakitić in the 69th minute. On 9 February 2011, he scored his first goal in his third appearance as a full international, netting the final goal in a 4–2 win against the Czech Republic, in a friendly match played in Pula. He came on as substitute of Niko Kranjčar in the 64th minute in the match against Republic of Ireland.

Iličević was initially listed amongst the 23 Croatian players selected for Euro 2012 in Poland and Ukraine, but was forced to withdraw due to an injury he suffered during practice with the national team, just one week before the tournament. He also missed the 2014 World Cup finals in Brazil due to injury. His final international was a November 2013 World Cup qualification match away against Iceland.

== Honours ==
1. FC Kaiserslautern

- 2. Bundesliga: 2009–10
