= 2014 FC Kairat season =

FC Kairat
2014 season
- Chairman: Kairat Boranbayev
- Manager: Vladimír Weiss
- Stadium: Central Stadium
- Kazakhstan Premier League: 3rd
- Kazakhstan Cup: Winners
- Europa League: Second qualifying round vs Esbjerg
- Top goalscorer: League: Gerard Gohou (12); All: Gerard Gohou (14)
Home colours	Away colours	Third colours

The 2014 FC Kairat season was the 4th successive season that the club playing in the Kazakhstan Premier League, the highest tier of association football in Kazakhstan, since their promotion back to the top flight in 2009. Kairat finished the season in 3rd place, winning the Kazakhstan Cup and reaching the Second qualifying round of the Europa League, being knocked out by Esbjerg.

== Squad ==
As of match played 22 November 2014

No.	Name	Nationality	Position	Date of birth (age)	Signed from	Signed in	Apps.	Goals
Goalkeepers
16	Dmitri Khomich	(Russia)	GK	27 July 1989 (aged 25)	Alania Vladikavkaz	2014	33	0
24	Serhiy Tkachuk	(Kazakhstan)	GK	15 February 1992 (aged 22)	Shakhter Karagandy	2014	6	0
	Vladimir Groshev	(Kazakhstan)	GK	4 January 1995 (aged 19)	Academy	2012	0	0
	Ilya Karavaev	(Kazakhstan)	GK	4 May 1995 (aged 19)	Academy	2014	0	0
Defenders
2	Zaurbek Pliyev	(Russia)	DF	27 September 1991 (aged 23)	Alania Vladikavkaz	2014	31	3
3	Mark Gorman	(Kazakhstan)	DF	9 February 1989 (aged 25)	Lokomotiv Astana	2012	86	1
5	Aleksandr Kislitsyn	(Kazakhstan)	DF	8 March 1986 (aged 28)	Tobol	2013	65	7
6	Žarko Marković	(Serbia)	DF	28 January 1987 (aged 27)	Gaz Metan Mediaș	2014	21	3
8	Samat Smakov	(Kazakhstan)	DF	8 December 1978 (aged 35)	Çaykur Rizespor	2013	40	0
13	Yermek Kuantayev	(Kazakhstan)	DF	13 October 1990 (aged 24)	Tobol	2014	32	3
18	Timur Rudoselskiy	(Kazakhstan)	DF	21 December 1994 (aged 19)	Academy	2012	7	0
20	Ľubomír Michalík	(Slovakia)	DF	13 August 1983 (aged 31)	Portsmouth	2013	52	0
50	Bauyrzhan Tanirbergenov	(Kazakhstan)	MF	11 February 1995 (aged 19)	Academy	2012	1	0
	Nurbol Askar	(Kazakhstan)	DF	19 February 1995 (aged 19)	Academy	2014	0	0
	Yernar Kydyrali	(Kazakhstan)	DF	15 December 1995 (aged 18)	Academy	2012	0	0
	Dilshat Musayev	(Kazakhstan)	DF	9 January 1995 (aged 19)	Academy	2012	0	0
	Ravil Saurambaev	(Kazakhstan)	DF	16 May 1993 (aged 21)	Academy	2012	0	0
	Kasymzhan Taipov	(Kazakhstan)	DF	19 February 1995 (aged 19)	Academy	2012	0	0
	Anuar Umashov	(Kazakhstan)	DF	30 August 1995 (aged 19)	Academy	2012	0	0
	Argen Zhumateev	(Kazakhstan)	DF	21 October 1994 (aged 20)	Academy	2012	1	0
Midfielders
7	Zhambyl Kukeyev	(Kazakhstan)	MF	20 September 1988 (aged 26)	Shakhter Karagandy	2013	15	2
9	Bauyrzhan Islamkhan	(Kazakhstan)	MF	23 February 1993 (aged 21)	Kuban Krasnodar	2014	41	6
10	Josip Knežević	(Croatia)	MF	3 October 1988 (aged 26)	Amkar Perm	2013	69	25
17	Aslan Darabayev	(Kazakhstan)	MF	21 January 1989 (aged 25)	Shakhter Karagandy	2014	32	12
19	Mikhail Bakayev	(Russia)	MF	5 August 1987 (aged 27)	Alania Vladikavkaz	2014	37	0
22	Aslan Orazaev	(Kazakhstan)	MF	7 May 1992 (aged 22)	Academy	2013	1	0
27	Artur Yedigaryan	(Armenia)	MF	26 June 1987 (aged 27)	Hoverla Uzhhorod	2013	42	2
28	Stanislav Lunin	(Kazakhstan)	MF	13 March 1994 (aged 20)	Shakhter Karagandy	2014	21	0
29	Vitali Li	(Kazakhstan)	MF	13 March 1994 (aged 20)	Shakhter Karagandy	2013	18	4
31	Isael	(Brazil)	MF	13 May 1988 (aged 26)	Krasnodar	2014	21	6
32	Islambek Kuat	(Kazakhstan)	MF	12 January 1993 (aged 21)	Astana	2014	7	0
80	Rifat Nurmagamet	(Kazakhstan)	MF	22 May 1996 (aged 18)	Academy	2014	3	0
	Yusuf Azizov	(Kazakhstan)	MF	24 October 1995 (aged 19)	Academy	2014	0	0
	Oybek Baltabaev	(Kazakhstan)	MF	13 June 1994 (aged 20)	Academy	2012	0	0
	Nurlan Dairov	(Kazakhstan)	MF	26 June 1995 (aged 19)	Academy	2012	0	0
	Anuar Jagippar	(Kazakhstan)	MF	2 January 1995 (aged 19)	Academy	2013	0	0
	Arman Nyusup	(Kazakhstan)	MF	22 January 1994 (aged 20)	Academy	2012	0	0
	Dosim Ocasov	(Kazakhstan)	MF	5 February 1993 (aged 21)	Academy	2013	0	0
	Madiyar Raimbek	(Kazakhstan)	MF	15 August 1995 (aged 19)	Academy	2012	0	0
	Kuanysh Sovetov	(Kazakhstan)	MF	11 May 1995 (aged 19)	Academy	2014	1	0
Forwards
14	Bauyrzhan Baytana	(Kazakhstan)	FW	6 May 1992 (aged 22)	Taraz	2014	11	1
21	Momodou Ceesay	(The Gambia)	FW	24 December 1988 (aged 25)	MŠK Žilina	2013	40	18
23	Miloš Lačný	(Slovakia)	FW	4 March 1988 (aged 26)	MFK Ružomberok	2014	13	3
26	Sito Riera	(Spain)	FW	5 January 1987 (aged 27)	Chornomorets Odesa	2014	16	2
30	Gerard Gohou	(Ivory Coast)	FW	29 December 1988 (aged 25)	Krasnodar	2014	20	14
	Zhanserik Kohhanat	(Kazakhstan)	FW	9 April 1995 (aged 19)	Academy	2014	0	0
	Georgy Makaev	(Kazakhstan)	FW	12 August 1994 (aged 20)	Tsesna	2012	1	0
	Magomed Paragulgov	(Kazakhstan)	FW	27 March 1994 (aged 20)	Olé Brasil	2012	0	0
Players away on loan
	Sergey Keyler	(Kazakhstan)	DF	8 November 1994 (aged 20)	Tsesna	2012	18	1
	Ilya Kalinin	(Kazakhstan)	MF	3 February 1992 (aged 22)	Tsesna	2012	35	2
	Nurzharyk Kunov	(Kazakhstan)	MF	22 October 1993 (aged 21)	Sunkar	2012	1	0
Players that left during the season
1	David Loria	(Kazakhstan)	GK	31 October 1981 (aged 33)	Çaykur Rizespor	2013	16	0
11	Sherkhan Bauyrzhan	(Kazakhstan)	MF	28 August 1992 (aged 22)	Taraz	2014	12	0
15	Vladimir Sedelnikov	(Kazakhstan)	DF	15 October 1991 (aged 23)	Denizlispor	2014	9	0
25	Vladyslav Nekhtiy	(Ukraine)	MF	19 December 1991 (aged 22)	Shakhtar Donetsk	2013	16	0
	Denis Shchipkov	(Kazakhstan)	GK	27 July 1994 (aged 20)	Academy	2012	0	0

== Transfers ==
=== Winter ===
In: Note: Flags indicate national team as defined under FIFA eligibility rules; some limited exceptions apply. Players may hold more than one non-FIFA nationality.

No.	Pos.	Nation	Player
2	DF	RUS	Zaurbek Pliyev (from (Russia) Alania Vladikavkaz)
6	DF	SRB	Žarko Marković (from (Romania) Gaz Metan Mediaș)
9	MF	KAZ	Bauyrzhan Islamkhan (from (Russia) Kuban Krasnodar, previously on loan to (Kazakhstan) Astana)
13	DF	KAZ	Yermek Kuantayev (from (Kazakhstan) Tobol)
16	GK	RUS	Dmitri Khomich (from (Russia) Alania Vladikavkaz)
17	MF	KAZ	Aslan Darabayev (from (Kazakhstan) Shakhter Karagandy)
19	MF	RUS	Mikhail Bakayev (from (Russia) Alania Vladikavkaz)
23	FW	CZE	Miloš Lačný (from (Slovakia) MFK Ružomberok)

Out: Note: Flags indicate national team as defined under FIFA eligibility rules; some limited exceptions apply. Players may hold more than one non-FIFA nationality.

No.	Pos.	Nation	Player
2	DF	GHA	Daniel Addo (loan return to (Ukraine) Zorya Luhansk)
4	DF	KAZ	Sergey Keyler (loan to (Kazakhstan) Kyzylzhar)
7	MF	KAZ	Ruslan Sakhalbaev (to (Kazakhstan) Spartak Semey)
8	MF	SCO	Stuart Duff
9	FW	KAZ	Timur Baizhanov (to (Kazakhstan) Irtysh Pavlodar)
11	MF	KAZ	Ilya Kalinin (loan to (Kazakhstan) Kaisar)
13	MF	KAZ	Vitali Li (loan return to (Kazakhstan) Shakhter Karagandy)
14	MF	KAZ	Vladimir Vyatkin (to (Kazakhstan) Caspiy)
16	GK	KAZ	Ildar Shaikheslamov (to (Kazakhstan) Makhtaaral)
17	MF	KAZ	Oleg Nedashkovsky (to (Kazakhstan) Taraz)
18	MF	FIN	Alexei Eremenko (to (Scotland) Kilmarnock)
22	MF	KAZ	Kirill Shestakov (to (Kazakhstan) Kaisar)
23	MF	KAZ	Nikita Utrobin
24	MF	KGZ	Anton Zemlianukhin (to (Kazakhstan) Kaisar)
29	FW	KAZ	Rauan Sariev (to (Kazakhstan) Zhetysu)
30	GK	KAZ	Daniil Rikhard (to (Kazakhstan) Spartak Semey)
33	MF	KAZ	Kazbek Geteriev (to (Kazakhstan) Ordabasy)
41	GK	KAZ	Andrey Andreev
44	FW	KAZ	Galym Rayshanov
45	FW	KAZ	Magamed Uzdenov
46	DF	KAZ	Galymzhan Bersugurov
55	DF	KAZ	Alikhan Shabdenov
60	DF	KAZ	Ruslan Zununov
63	FW	KAZ	Boris Donchenko
65	DF	KAZ	Kanat Dauletbakov
66	MF	KAZ	Nurzharyk Kunov (loan to (Kazakhstan) Kaisar)

=== Summer ===
In: Note: Flags indicate national team as defined under FIFA eligibility rules; some limited exceptions apply. Players may hold more than one non-FIFA nationality.

No.	Pos.	Nation	Player
14	MF	KAZ	Bauyrzhan Baytana (from (Kazakhstan) Taraz)
26	FW	ESP	Sito Riera
28	MF	KAZ	Stanislav Lunin (from (Kazakhstan) Shakhter Karagandy)
29	MF	KAZ	Vitali Li (from (Kazakhstan) Shakhter Karagandy)
30	FW	CIV	Gerard Gohou (from (Russia) Krasnodar)
31	MF	BRA	Isael (from (Russia) Krasnodar)
32	MF	KAZ	Islambek Kuat (from (Kazakhstan) Astana)

Out: Note: Flags indicate national team as defined under FIFA eligibility rules; some limited exceptions apply. Players may hold more than one non-FIFA nationality.

No.	Pos.	Nation	Player
1	GK	KAZ	David Loria (to (Turkey) Karşıyaka)
11	MF	KAZ	Sherkhan Bauyrzhan (to (Kazakhstan) Shakhter Karagandy)
25	MF	UKR	Vladyslav Nekhtiy (to (Kazakhstan) Kaisar)

== Competitions ==
=== Kazakhstan Premier League ===
==== First round ====
===== Results summary =====
Overall								Home						Away					
Pld	W	D	L	GF	GA	GD	Pts	W	D	L	GF	GA	GD	W	D	L	GF	GA	GD
22	13	3	6	41	20	+21	42	8	1	2	24	8	+16	5	2	4	17	12	+5

Last updated: 2 December 2014.
Source: Soccerway

===== Results by round =====
Round	1	2	3	4	5	6	7	8	9	10	11	12	13	14	15	16	17	18	19	20	21	22
Ground																						
Result																						
Position																						

Source: Soccerway
A = Away; H = Home; W = Win; D = Draw; L = Loss

===== Results =====
15 March 2014 1	Kairat	0 – 1	Atyrau	Almaty
18:00 (UTC+6)	Marković (yellow card) 5'; Pliyev (yellow card) 59'	Summary	Karpovich (yellow card) 29'; Savio 31' (yellow card) 41'; E.Kostrub (yellow card) 50'; Afanasyev (yellow card) 83'	Stadium: Central Stadium; Attendance: 8,000; Referee: Denis Izmailov

22 March 2014 2	Zhetysu	1 – 0	Kairat	Taldykorgan
18:00 (UTC+6)	S.Schaff 20'; T.Adilkhanov (yellow card) 43'; Putinčanin (yellow card) 81'	Summary	Ceesay (yellow card) 23'; Nekhtiy (yellow card) 81'; Yedigaryan (yellow card) 90+2'	Stadium: Zhetysu Stadium; Attendance: 4,500; Referee: Igor Aleshin

29 March 2014 3	Kairat	0 – 1	Ordabasy	Almaty
17:00 (UTC+6)	Yedigaryan (yellow card) 42'	Summary	Junuzović 84'	Stadium: Central Stadium; Attendance: 9,500; Referee: Ruslan Duzmambetov

5 April 2014 4	Kaisar	0 – 1	Kairat	Kyzylorda
16:00 (UTC+6)	R.Rozybakiev (yellow card) 25'; D.Dautov (yellow card) 38'; Klein (yellow card) 89'	Summary	Marković (yellow card) 56'; Darabayev 89'	Stadium: Gany Muratbayev Stadium; Attendance: 4,000; Referee: Igor Khisamutdinov

9 April 2014 5	Kairat	0 – 0	Astana	Almaty
19:00 (UTC+6)	Kislitsyn (yellow card) 57'; Yedigaryan (yellow card) 52' (red card) 90'; Pliyev (yellow card) 83' (red card) 90'; Bakayev (yellow card) 90'	Summary	Kéthévoama (yellow card) 2'; Nurdauletov (yellow card) 62'; Cañas (yellow card) 90'	Stadium: Central Stadium; Attendance: 5,500; Referee: Artyom Kuchin

13 April 2014 6	Kairat	3 – 1	Taraz	Almaty
18:00 (UTC+6)	Marković 36'; Knežević 41'; Kuantayev (yellow card) 52'; Kislitsyn 90+3'	Summary	I.Vorotnikov (yellow card) 55'; Shchetkin 70'; Roj (yellow card) 79'	Stadium: Central Stadium; Attendance: 3,000; Referee: Marat Iskakov

19 April 2014 7	Tobol	2 – 2	Kairat	Kostanay
16:00 (UTC+6)	Bogdanov (yellow card) 19' (goal) 69'; Volkov (yellow card) 28'; Jeslínek (yellow card) 38'; Kučera (yellow card) 54'; O.Krasić 73'	Summary	Ceesay 27'; Knežević 43' (yellow card) 89'; Kislitsyn (yellow card) 45'	Stadium: Central Stadium; Attendance: 2,000; Referee: Igor Chesnokov

27 April 2014 8	Kairat	2 – 1	Irtysh	Almaty
18:00 (UTC+6)	Kuantayev 39'; Darabayev 41'	Summary	Mukhutdinov (yellow card) 16'; Govedarica (yellow card) 57' (goal) 89'	Stadium: Central Stadium; Attendance: 5,500; Referee: Askhat Abdanbayev

1 May 2014 9	Aktobe	1 – 0	Kairat	Aktobe
18:00 (UTC+6)	Khairullin 25' (yellow card) 60'; Danilo Neco (yellow card) 54'; P.Badlo (yellow card) 58'	Summary	Islamkhan (yellow card) 12'; Yedigaryan (yellow card) 57'; Marković (yellow card) 60'	Stadium: Central Stadium; Attendance: 3,000; Referee: Aleksandr Gauzer

6 May 2014 10	Kairat	2 – 0	Shakhter Karagandy	Almaty
19:00 (UTC+6)	Knežević 9'; Ceesay 67'; Khomich (yellow card) 78'	Summary	Yago (yellow card) 51'; Murzoev (yellow card) 67'	Stadium: Central Stadium; Attendance: 9,000; Referee: Denis Izmailov

10 May 2014 11	Spartak Semey	2 – 5	Kairat	Semey
16:00 (UTC+6)	Čović 20'; Jovanović 59'; Azovskiy (yellow card) 70'; B.Turysbek (yellow card) 72'	Summary	Ceesay 17' (pen.), 69'; Marković 22' (yellow card) 39'; Knežević 52'; Darabayev 55'	Stadium: Spartak Stadium; Attendance: 5,000; Referee: Bolat Karlibayev

18 May 2014 12	Kairat	2 – 1	Zhetysu	Almaty
19:00 (UTC+6)	Ceesay 19'; Kislitsyn (yellow card) 50'; Lačný 85'; Knežević (yellow card) 90+1'	Summary	B.Shaikhov (yellow card) 21'; Rodionov (yellow card) 49'; S.Sariyev 90+2'	Stadium: Central Stadium; Attendance: 7,500; Referee: Marat Iskakov

24 May 2014 13	Ordabasy	1 – 0	Kairat	Shymkent
18:00 (UTC+6)	Nurgaliev (yellow card) 10'; Aliev (yellow card) 63'; Kasyanov (yellow card) 81'; Bakayev 86' (o.g.); Grigorenko (yellow card) 90+3'	Summary	Kislitsyn (yellow card) 13'; Michalík (yellow card) 90+3'	Stadium: Kazhimukan Munaitpasov Stadium; Attendance: 3,500; Referee: Akmalkhan Kholmatov

28 May 2014 14	Kairat	1 – 0	Kaisar	Almaty
19:00 (UTC+6)	Darabayev 10' (yellow card) 39'; V.Sedelnikov (yellow card) 64'; Pliyev (yellow card) 79'; Kuantayev (yellow card) 82'	Summary	R.Rozybakiev (yellow card) 18'; A.Baltaev (yellow card) 32'; Maruško (yellow card) 70'; N.Kunov (yellow card) 72'	Stadium: Central Stadium; Attendance: 9,000; Referee: Anatolyi Vishnichenko

1 June 2014 15	Astana	2 – 2	Kairat	Astana
17:00 (UTC+6)	Bressan 29'; Dzholchiev 34'; Muzhikov (yellow card) 83'	Summary	Pliyev 39' (yellow card) 76'; Gorman (yellow card) 63'; Darabayev 65'; Bakayev (yellow card) 71'	Stadium: Astana Arena; Attendance: 2,000; Referee: Igor Aleshin

14 June 2014 16	Taraz	2 – 3	Kairat	Taraz
18:00 (UTC+6)	Tleshev 15'; Skorykh 55'; Shchetkin (yellow card) 73'; Dosmagambetov (yellow card) 80'	Summary	Islamkhan 7', 64' (yellow card) 15'; Marković 54' (yellow card) 73'	Stadium: Central Stadium; Attendance: 3,850; Referee: Igor Chesnokov

22 June 2014 17	Kairat	3 – 1	Tobol	Almaty
19:00 (UTC+6)	Pliyev 5'; Smakov (yellow card) 25'; Kislitsyn (yellow card) 51'; Kuantayev 76'; Islamkhan 89'	Summary	Kušnír (yellow card) 25'; Volkov 51'; Irismetov (yellow card) 64'	Stadium: Central Stadium; Attendance: 7,000; Referee: Bolat Karlibayev

27 June 2014 18	Irtysh	0 – 1	Kairat	Pavlodar
18:30 (UTC+6)	Bulgaru (yellow card) 84'	Summary	Islamkhan (yellow card) 55'; B.Baytana 62'	Stadium: Central Stadium; Attendance: 2,000; Referee: Anatolyi Vishnichenko

6 July 2014 19	Kairat	7 – 1	Aktobe	Almaty
20:00 (UTC+6)	Gohou 8', 76', 83' (yellow card) 69'; Knežević 25', 56' (pen.); Pliyev 46'; Islamkhan 52'	Summary	Muldarov (yellow card) 48'; Shabalin (yellow card) 56'; Khairullin (yellow card) 59'; Antonov 87'	Stadium: Central Stadium; Attendance: 12,000; Referee: Artyom Kuchin

13 July 2014 20	Shakhter Karagandy	1 – 0	Kairat	Karaganda
16:30 (UTC+6)	Topcagić 21' (yellow card) 69'; Finonchenko (yellow card) 63'	Summary	Michalík (yellow card) 65'; Khomich (yellow card) 72'	Stadium: Shakhter Stadium; Attendance: 4,000; Referee: Igor Aleshin

27 July 2014 21	Kairat	4 – 1	Spartak Semey	Almaty
20:00 (UTC+6)	Kutsov 6' (o.g.); Isael (yellow card) 39'; Gohou 56', 84'; Kislitsyn 86'	Summary	Jovanović 17'; Genev (yellow card) 19'; A.Yersalimov (yellow card) 77'	Stadium: Central Stadium; Attendance: 7,300; Referee: Viktor Antonov

3 August 2014 22	Atyrau	0 – 3	Kairat	Atyrau
18:00 (UTC+6)		Summary	Gohou 23'; Abdulin 83' (o.g.); Darabayev 90+3'	Stadium: Munaishy Stadium; Attendance: 3,000; Referee: Igor Khisamutdinov

===== League table =====
Pos	Team	Pld	W	D	L	GF	GA	GD	Pts	Qualification
1	Aktobe	22	12	7	3	34	17	+17	43	Qualification for the championship round
2	Kairat	22	13	3	6	41	20	+21	42	Qualification for the championship round
3	Astana	22	10	9	3	34	17	+17	39	Qualification for the championship round
4	Shakhter Karagandy	22	11	3	8	33	27	+6	36	Qualification for the championship round
5	Ordabasy	22	10	5	7	24	22	+2	35	Qualification for the championship round

Source: Soccerway (in Russian)
Rules for classification: 1st points;
Two team tiebreak: 1st overall wins; 2nd head-to-head record; 3rd goals difference; 4th goals scored; 5th away goals scored;
Multiple teams tiebreak: 1st overall wins; 2nd goals difference; 3rd goals scored; 4th away goals scored

==== Championship Round ====
===== Results summary =====
Overall								Home						Away					
Pld	W	D	L	GF	GA	GD	Pts	W	D	L	GF	GA	GD	W	D	L	GF	GA	GD
10	5	2	3	17	11	+6	17	3	1	1	13	5	+8	2	1	2	4	6	−2

Last updated: 1 December 2014.
Source: Soccerway

===== Results by round =====
Round	1	2	3	4	5	6	7	8	9	10
Ground	H	A	A	H	A	H	A	H	A	H
Result	W	W	W	W	D	D	L	W	L	L
Position	2	1	1	1	1	1	2	2	2	2

Source: Soccerway
A = Away; H = Home; W = Win; D = Draw; L = Loss

===== Results =====
22 August 2014 1	Astana	Postponed	Kairat	Astana
(UTC+6)		Summary		Stadium: Astana Arena

28 August 2014 2	Kairat	6 – 1	Shakhter Karagandy	Almaty
20:00 (UTC+6)	Kislitsyn 44'; Isael 46', 69'; Gohou 57', 59'; Darabayev 68'	Summary	Vičius 21'; Pokrivač (yellow card) 75'; Maslo (yellow card) 85'	Stadium: Central Stadium; Attendance: 7,500; Referee: Ruslan Duzmambetov

14 September 2014 3	Kaisar	0 – 2	Kairat	Kyzylorda
17:00 (UTC+6)	Coulibaly (yellow card) 52'; Jablan (yellow card) 71'	Summary	Islamkhan (yellow card) 43'; Gohou 62', 83'	Stadium: Gany Muratbayev Stadium; Attendance: 3,000; Referee: Denis Izmailov

20 September 2014 4	Ordabasy	0 – 1	Kairat	Shymkent
14:00 (UTC+6)	Ashirbekov (red card) 34'; Mwesigwa (yellow card) 55'	Summary	Michalík (red card) 34'; Yedigaryan (red card) 34'; Isael 72'	Stadium: Kazhimukan Munaitpasov Stadium; Attendance: 3,000; Referee: Igor Aleshin

28 September 2014 5	Kairat	2 – 0	Aktobe	Almaty
18:00 (UTC+6)	Isael 21'; Islamkhan 53'; Khomich (yellow card) 62'; Marković (yellow card) 62'; Darabayev (yellow card) 64'	Summary	Korobkin (yellow card) 18'; Pizzelli (yellow card) 62'; Anderson Mineiro (yellow card) 62'; Muldarov (yellow card) 80'	Stadium: Central Stadium; Attendance: 10,000; Referee: Artyom Kuchin

4 October 2014 6	Shakhter Karagandy	0 – 0	Kairat	Karaganda
16:00 (UTC+6)	Paryvaew (yellow card) 61'; Murzoev (yellow card) 82'	Summary	Kislitsyn (yellow card) 5'; Lunin (yellow card) 32'; Kuantayev (yellow card) 44'; Yedigaryan (yellow card) 84'	Stadium: Shakhter Stadium; Attendance: 2,000; Referee: Igor Khisamutdinov

18 October 2014 7	Kairat	1 – 1	Kaisar	Almaty
18:00 (UTC+6)	Smakov (yellow card) 65'; Coulibaly 75' (o.g.)	Summary	D.Dautov (yellow card) 37'; Nekhtiy 53'; K.Pryadkin (yellow card) 90+4'	Stadium: Central Stadium; Attendance: 7,500; Referee: Askhat Abdanbayev

22 October 2014 1	Astana	5 – 1	Kairat	Astana
19:30 (UTC+6)	Cañas 44', 45'; Nusserbayev 47' (yellow card) 61'; Aničić (yellow card) 81'; Twumasi 85', 87'	Summary	Isael 5'; Gohou (yellow card) 49'; Pliyev (yellow card) 61'; Islamkhan (yellow card) 83'	Stadium: Astana Arena; Attendance: 4,500; Referee: Akmalkhan Kholmatov

26 October 2014 8	Kairat	2 – 0	Ordabasy	Almaty
18:00 (UTC+6)	Darabayev 13'; Riera 21'; Kuantayev (yellow card) 25'; V.Li (yellow card) 80'	Summary	Diakate (yellow card) 89'	Stadium: Central Stadium; Attendance: 9,000; Referee: Denis Izmailov

1 November 2014 9	Aktobe	1 – 0	Kairat	Aktobe
18:00 (UTC+6)	Muldarov (yellow card) 62'; Arzumanyan (yellow card) 63'; Khairullin (yellow card) 63'; D.Zhalmukan (yellow card) 83' (goal) 83'	Summary	Yedigaryan (yellow card) 25'; Darabayev (yellow card) 42'; Kuat (yellow card) 42'; Michalík (yellow card) 63'	Stadium: Central Stadium; Attendance: 8,000; Referee: Igor Aleshin

9 November 2014 10	Kairat	2 – 3	Astana	Almaty
15:00 (UTC+6)	Islamkhan (yellow card) 19'; Gohou 60', 90+4' (yellow card) 70'; Marković (yellow card) 63'; Yedigaryan (yellow card) 65'	Summary	Twumasi 4'; Cañas (yellow card) 21'; Muzhikov 36'; Kéthévoama 53'	Stadium: Central Stadium; Attendance: 6,000; Referee: Igor Khisamutdinov

===== Table =====
Pos	Team	Pld	W	D	L	GF	GA	GD	Pts	Qualification
1	Astana (C)	32	18	10	4	63	26	+37	45	Qualification for the Champions League second qualifying round
2	Aktobe	32	17	10	5	52	31	+21	40	Qualification for the Europa League first qualifying round
3	Kairat	32	18	5	9	58	31	+27	38	Qualification for the Europa League first qualifying round
4	Ordabasy	32	13	5	14	34	44	−10	27	Qualification for the Europa League first qualifying round
5	Kaisar	32	10	13	9	30	34	−4	27	

Source: Soccerway (in Russian)
Rules for classification: 1st points;
Two team tiebreak: 1st overall wins; 2nd head-to-head record; 3rd goals difference; 4th goals scored; 5th away goals scored;
Multiple teams tiebreak: 1st overall wins; 2nd goals difference; 3rd goals scored; 4th away goals scored.
Team start with half number of points from first round.
(C) Champions

=== Kazakhstan Cup ===
23 April 2014 First Round	Okzhetpes	1 – 3	Kairat	Kokshetau
14:00 (UTC+6)	Buleshev (yellow card) 52' (goal) 90'; Abduscheev (yellow card) 61'	Summary	Lačný 4', 26'; Nekhtiy 89'	Stadium: Okzhetpes Stadium; Attendance: 2,000; Referee: Timur Kumasev

14 May 2014 Second Round	Kairat	3 – 1	Gefest	Almaty
19:00 (UTC+6)	Ceesay 19'; Yedigaryan 37'; Islamkhan (yellow card) 50'; Kuantayev 78'	Summary	M.Muzhikov 51'; D.Karpov (yellow card) 59'; Ablakimov (yellow card) 65'	Stadium: Central Stadium; Attendance: 4,000; Referee: Timur Kumashev

18 June 2014 Quarter-final	Atyrau	1 – 3	Kairat	Atyrau
19:30 (UTC+6)	Trifunović 38'	Summary	Darabayev 59'; Islamkhan 66'; Knežević 70'	Stadium: Munaishy Stadium; Attendance: 4,000; Referee: Igor Khisamutdinov

16 August 2014 Semi Final 1st leg	Kairat	2 – 0	Shakhter Karagandy	Almaty
20:00 (UTC+6)	Riera 20'; Darabaev 86'; Michalík (yellow card) 90+3'; Smakov (yellow card) 90+3'	Summary	Z.Zhangylyshbai (yellow card) 90+3' (yellow-red card) 90+4'	Stadium: Central Stadium; Attendance: 8,000; Referee: Igor Aleshin

24 September 2014 Semi Final 2nd leg	Shakhter Karagandy	0 – 2 (0 – 4 agg.)	Kairat	Karagandy
18:00 (UTC+6)		Summary	Marković (yellow card) 68'; Isael 83'; Kislitsyn 87'	Stadium: Shakhtyor Stadium; Attendance: 5,000; Referee: Ruslan Duzmambetov

22 November 2014 Final	Kairat	4 – 1	Aktobe	Astana
15:00 (UTC+6)	Arzumanyan 19' (o.g.); Gohou 30', 64'; Michalík (yellow card) 57'; Darabayev 89'; Sito Riera (red card) 89'	Summary	Anderson Mineiro (yellow card) 25'; Logvinenko 29'; Korobkin (yellow card) 59'	Stadium: Astana Arena; Attendance: 7,500; Referee: Ruslan Duzmambetov

=== UEFA Europa League ===
==== Qualifying rounds ====
3 July 2014 First qualifying round 1st leg	Kairat (Kazakhstan)	1 – 0	(Albania) Kukësi	Almaty, Kazakhstan
20:00 (UTC+6)	Pliyev (yellow card) 32'; Kislitsyn (yellow card) 88'; Darabayev 89'; Bakayev (yellow card) 90+5'	Report	Halili (yellow card) 88'	Stadium: Almaty Central Stadium; Attendance: 14,000; Referee: Rahim Hasanov (Azerbaijan)

10 July 2014 First qualifying round 2nd leg	Kukësi (Albania)	0 – 0 (0 – 1 agg.)	(Kazakhstan) Kairat	Tirana, Albania
23:30 (UTC+6)	Dushku (yellow card) 73'; Cikalleshi (yellow card) 90+4'	Report	Kislitsyn (yellow card) 29'	Stadium: Stadiumi Qemal Stafa; Attendance: 2,000; Referee: Neil Doyle (Republic of Ireland)

17 July 2014 Second qualifying round 1st leg	Kairat (Kazakhstan)	1 – 1	(Denmark) Esbjerg	Almaty, Kazakhstan
20:00 (UTC+6)	Smakov (yellow card) 36'; Knežević 50' (pen.); Lunin (yellow card) 89'	Report	van Buren (yellow card) 36'; Fellah (yellow card) 76' (goal) 90+2'; Nielsen (yellow card) 90+4'	Stadium: Almaty Central Stadium; Attendance: 19,000; Referee: Oleksandr Derdo (Ukraine)

24 July 2014 Second qualifying round 2nd leg	Esbjerg (Denmark)	1 – 0 (2 – 1 agg.)	(Kazakhstan) Kairat	Esbjerg, Denmark
23:00 (UTC+6)	Ankersen 38'; Andersen (yellow card) 80'	Report	Pliyev (yellow card) 3'	Stadium: Blue Water Arena; Attendance: 5,522; Referee: Dennis Antamo (Finland)

== Squad statistics ==
As of Match played 22 November 2014

=== Appearances and goals ===
No.	Pos	Nat	Player	Total		Premier League		Kazakhstan Cup		UEFA Europa League	
No.	Pos	Nat	Player	Apps	Goals	Apps	Goals	Apps	Goals	Apps	Goals
2	DF	(Russia) RUS	Zaurbek Pliyev	31	3	24	3	3	0	4	0
3	DF	(Kazakhstan) KAZ	Mark Gorman	31	0	18+5	0	5	0	2+1	0
5	DF	(Kazakhstan) KAZ	Aleksandr Kislitsyn	36	4	26+2	3	4	1	4	0
6	DF	(Serbia) SRB	Žarko Marković	21	3	17+1	3	3	0	0	0
8	DF	(Kazakhstan) KAZ	Samat Smakov	34	0	24+1	0	5	0	4	0
7	MF	(Kazakhstan) KAZ	Zhambyl Kukeyev	1	0	0+1	0	0	0	0	0
9	MF	(Kazakhstan) KAZ	Bauyrzhan Islamkhan	41	6	28+3	5	6	1	4	0
10	MF	(Croatia) CRO	Josip Knežević	23	8	14+3	6	2	1	2+2	1
13	DF	(Kazakhstan) KAZ	Yermek Kuantayev	32	3	23+2	2	4+1	1	2	0
14	FW	(Kazakhstan) KAZ	Bauyrzhan Baitana	11	1	5+3	1	0+1	0	1+1	0
16	GK	(Russia) RUS	Dmitri Khomich	33	0	26	0	3	0	4	0
17	MF	(Kazakhstan) KAZ	Aslan Darabayev	32	12	16+9	8	5+1	3	0+1	1
18	DF	(Kazakhstan) KAZ	Timur Rudoselskiy	7	0	3+2	0	1+1	0	0	0
19	MF	(Russia) RUS	Mikhail Bakayev	37	0	27+1	0	5	0	4	0
20	DF	(Slovakia) SVK	Ľubomír Michalík	24	0	14+3	0	2+1	0	4	0
21	FW	(The Gambia) GAM	Momodou Ceesay	14	6	13	5	1	1	0	0
22	MF	(Kazakhstan) KAZ	Aslan Orazaev	1	0	0+1	0	0	0	0	0
23	FW	(Slovakia) SVK	Miloš Lačný	13	3	8+3	1	2	2	0	0
24	GK	(Kazakhstan) KAZ	Serhiy Tkachuk	6	0	3	0	3	0	0	0
26	FW	(Spain) ESP	Sito Riera	16	2	9+3	1	2+1	1	0+1	0
27	MF	(Armenia) ARM	Artur Yedigaryan	32	1	20+5	0	2+2	1	3	0
28	MF	(Kazakhstan) KAZ	Stanislav Lunin	21	0	5+10	0	0+3	0	0+3	0
29	MF	(Kazakhstan) KAZ	Vitali Li	6	0	0+5	0	0	0	0+1	0
30	FW	(Ivory Coast) CIV	Gerard Gohou	20	14	9+4	12	3	2	4	0
31	MF	(Brazil) BRA	Isael	21	6	13+1	5	3	1	2+2	0
32	MF	(Kazakhstan) KAZ	Islambek Kuat	7	0	3+3	0	1	0	0	0
50	DF	(Kazakhstan) KAZ	Bauyrzhan Tanirbergenov	1	0	0	0	0+1	0	0	0
60	MF	(Kazakhstan) KAZ	Kuanysh Sovetov	1	0	0	0	0+1	0	0	0
80	MF	(Kazakhstan) KAZ	Rifat Nurmugamet	3	0	0+1	0	0+2	0	0	0
Players away from Kairat on loan:
Players who appeared for Kairat that left during the season:
1	GK	(Kazakhstan) KAZ	David Loria	3	0	3	0	0	0	0	0
11	MF	(Kazakhstan) KAZ	Sherkhan Bauyrzhan	12	0	1+9	0	0+2	0	0	0
15	DF	(Kazakhstan) KAZ	Vladimir Sedelnikov	9	0	0+9	0	0	0	0	0
25	MF	(Ukraine) UKR	Vladyslav Nekhtiy	7	1	0+5	0	1+1	1	0	0

=== Goal scorers ===
Place	Position	Nation	Number	Name	Premier League	Kazakhstan Cup	UEFA Europa League	Total
1	FW	(Ivory Coast)	30	Gerard Gohou	12	2	0	14
2	MF	(Kazakhstan)	17	Aslan Darabayev	8	3	1	12
3	MF	(Croatia)	10	Josip Knežević	6	1	1	8
4	FW	(The Gambia)	21	Momodou Ceesay	5	1	0	6
4	MF	(Kazakhstan)	9	Bauyrzhan Islamkhan	5	1	0	6
4	MF	(Brazil)	31	Isael	5	1	0	6
7	DF	(Kazakhstan)	5	Aleksandr Kislitsyn	3	1	0	4
7				Own goal	3	1	0	4
9	DF	(Serbia)	6	Žarko Marković	3	0	0	3
9	DF	(Russia)	2	Zaurbek Pliyev	3	0	0	3
9	MF	(Kazakhstan)	13	Yermek Kuantayev	2	1	0	3
9	FW	(Czech Republic)	23	Miloš Lačný	1	2	0	3
13	FW	(Spain)	26	Sito Riera	1	1	0	2
14	FW	(Kazakhstan)	14	Bauyrzhan Baitana	1	0	0	1
14	MF	(Ukraine)	25	Vladyslav Nekhtiy	0	1	0	1
14	MF	(Armenia)	27	Artur Yedigaryan	0	1	0	1
				TOTALS	58	17	2	77

=== Disciplinary record ===
Number	Nation	Position	Name	Premier League		Kazakhstan Cup		UEFA Europa League		Total	
Number	Nation	Position	Name	Yellow card	Red card	Yellow card	Red card	Yellow card	Red card	Yellow card	Red card
2	(Russia)	DF	Zaurbek Pliyev	6	1	0	0	2	0	8	1
3	(Kazakhstan)	DF	Mark Gorman	1	0	0	0	0	0	1	0
5	(Kazakhstan)	DF	Aleksandr Kislitsyn	6	0	0	0	2	0	8	0
6	(Serbia)	DF	Žarko Marković	7	0	1	0	0	0	8	0
8	(Kazakhstan)	DF	Samat Smakov	2	0	1	0	1	0	4	0
9	(Kazakhstan)	MF	Bauyrzhan Islamkhan	6	0	1	0	0	0	7	0
10	(Croatia)	MF	Josip Knežević	2	0	0	0	0	0	2	0
13	(Kazakhstan)	DF	Yermek Kuantayev	4	0	0	0	0	0	4	0
16	(Russia)	GK	Dmitri Khomich	3	0	0	0	0	0	3	0
17	(Kazakhstan)	MF	Aslan Darabayev	4	0	0	0	0	0	4	0
19	(Russia)	MF	Mikhail Bakayev	2	0	0	0	1	0	3	0
20	(Slovakia)	DF	Ľubomír Michalík	3	1	2	0	0	0	5	1
21	(The Gambia)	FW	Momodou Ceesay	1	0	0	0	0	0	1	0
26	(Spain)	FW	Sito Riera	0	0	0	1	0	0	0	1
27	(Armenia)	MF	Artur Yedigaryan	8	2	0	0	0	0	8	2
28	(Kazakhstan)	MF	Stanislav Lunin	1	0	0	0	1	0	2	0
29	(Kazakhstan)	MF	Vitali Li	1	0	0	0	0	0	1	0
30	(Ivory Coast)	FW	Gerard Gohou	3	0	0	0	0	0	3	0
31	(Brazil)	MF	Isael	1	0	0	0	0	0	1	0
32	(Kazakhstan)	MF	Islambek Kuat	1	0	0	0	0	0	1	0
Players who left Kairat during the season:
15	(Kazakhstan)	DF	Vladimir Sedelnikov	1	0	0	0	0	0	1	0
25	(Ukraine)	MF	Vladyslav Nekhtiy	1	0	0	0	0	0	1	0
			TOTALS	64	4	5	1	7	0	76	5
