= 2016 FC Kairat season =

FC Kairat
2016 season
- Chairman: Kairat Boranbayev
- Manager: Aleksandr Borodyuk (until 5 April); Kakhaber Tskhadadze (from 7 April)
- Stadium: Central Stadium
- Kazakhstan Premier League: 2nd
- Kazakhstan Cup: Runners-up
- Kazakhstan Super Cup: Winners
- Europa League: Second qualifying round vs Maccabi Tel Aviv
- Top goalscorer: League: Gerard Gohou (22); All: Gerard Gohou (25)
- Average home league attendance: 10,319
| Home colours | Away colours | Third colours |

The 2016 FC Kairat season was the sixth successive season that the club played in the Kazakhstan Premier League, the highest tier of association football in Kazakhstan, since their promotion back to the top flight in 2009. As reigning Kazakhstan Cup champions, Kairat participated in the Kazakhstan Super Cup and the Europa League.

Aleksandr Borodyuk replaced Vladimír Weiss as the club's manager at the start of the season, but resigned as manager on 5 April following a poor start to the season. On 7 April, Kakhaber Tskhadadze was announced as the club's new manager.

== Squad ==
As of match played 19 November 2016

| No. | Name | Nationality | Position | Date of birth (age) | Signed from | Signed in | Apps. | Goals |
Goalkeepers
| 1 | Vladimir Plotnikov | (Kazakhstan) | GK | 3 April 1986 (aged 30) | Zhetysu | 2015 | 73 | 0 |
| 16 | Andrei Sidelnikov | (Kazakhstan) | GK | 8 March 1980 (aged 36) | Ordabasy | 2016 | 1 | 0 |
| 25 | Vladimir Groshev | (Kazakhstan) | GK | 4 January 1995 (aged 21) | Academy | 2012 | 0 | 0 |
| 27 | Stas Pokatilov | (Kazakhstan) | GK | 8 December 1992 (aged 23) | loan from Rostov | 2016 | 11 | 0 |
Defenders
| 2 | Timur Rudoselskiy | (Kazakhstan) | DF | 21 December 1994 (aged 21) | Academy | 2012 | 69 | 0 |
| 4 | Bruno Soares | (Brazil) | DF | 21 August 1988 (aged 28) | Fortuna Düsseldorf | 2015 | 27 | 1 |
| 6 | Žarko Marković | (Serbia) | DF | 28 January 1987 (aged 29) | Gaz Metan Mediaș | 2014 | 99 | 7 |
| 13 | Yermek Kuantayev | (Kazakhstan) | DF | 13 October 1990 (aged 26) | Tobol | 2014 | 89 | 6 |
| 14 | César Arzo | (Spain) | DF | 21 January 1986 (aged 30) | AEK Athens | 2016 | 16 | 1 |
| 23 | Gafurzhan Suyumbayev | (Kazakhstan) | DF | 19 August 1999 (aged 17) | Ordabasy | 2016 | 18 | 3 |
| 26 | Dilshat Musayev | (Kazakhstan) | DF | 9 January 1995 (aged 21) | Academy | 2012 | 0 | 0 |
Midfielders
| 3 | Yan Vorogovskiy | (Kazakhstan) | MF | 7 August 1996 (aged 20) | Kaisar | 2016 | 9 | 0 |
| 7 | Islambek Kuat | (Kazakhstan) | MF | 12 January 1993 (aged 23) | Astana | 2014 | 72 | 9 |
| 8 | Mikhail Bakayev | (Russia) | MF | 5 August 1987 (aged 29) | Alania Vladikavkaz | 2014 | 112 | 2 |
| 9 | Bauyrzhan Islamkhan | (Kazakhstan) | MF | 23 February 1993 (aged 23) | Kuban Krasnodar | 2014 | 123 | 35 |
| 10 | Isael | (Brazil) | MF | 13 May 1988 (aged 28) | Krasnodar | 2014 | 99 | 21 |
| 15 | Bauyrzhan Turysbek | (Kazakhstan) | MF | 15 October 1991 (aged 25) | Zhetysu | 2016 | 12 | 1 |
| 17 | Aslan Darabayev | (Kazakhstan) | MF | 21 January 1989 (aged 27) | Shakhter Karagandy | 2014 | 74 | 15 |
| 19 | Stanislav Lunin | (Kazakhstan) | MF | 13 March 1994 (aged 22) | Shakhter Karagandy | 2014 | 71 | 1 |
| 21 | Nurlan Dairov | (Kazakhstan) | MF | 26 June 1995 (aged 21) | Academy | 2012 | 3 | 0 |
| 22 | Madiyar Raimbek | (Kazakhstan) | MF | 15 August 1995 (aged 21) | Academy | 2012 | 1 | 0 |
| 24 | Rifat Nurmagamet | (Kazakhstan) | MF | 22 May 1996 (aged 20) | Academy | 2014 | 6 | 0 |
| 28 | Andrey Arshavin | (Russia) | MF | 29 May 1981 (aged 35) | Kuban Krasnodar | 2016 | 37 | 11 |
| 30 | Gerson Acevedo | (Chile) | MF | 5 April 1988 (aged 28) | Ural | 2016 | 16 | 3 |
| 44 | Anatoliy Tymoshchuk | (Ukraine) | MF | 30 March 1979 (aged 37) | Zenit St.Petersburg | 2015 | 50 | 1 |
Forwards
| 11 | Gerard Gohou | (Ivory Coast) | FW | 29 December 1988 (aged 27) | Krasnodar | 2014 | 98 | 68 |
| 20 | Léandre Tawamba | (Cameroon) | FW | 20 December 1989 (aged 26) | ViOn Zlaté Moravce | 2016 | 28 | 6 |
| | Magomed Paragulgov | (Kazakhstan) | FW | 26 March 1994 (aged 22) | Academy | 2012 | 0 | 0 |
Players away on loan
| 18 | Vitali Li | (Kazakhstan) | MF | 13 March 1994 (aged 22) | Shakhter Karagandy | 2013 | 48 | 6 |
Players that left during the season
| 5 | Lukáš Tesák | (Slovakia) | MF | 8 March 1985 (aged 31) | Arsenal Tula | 2016 | 21 | 1 |
| 15 | Sito Riera | (Spain) | FW | 5 January 1987 (aged 29) | Chornomorets Odesa | 2014 | 56 | 6 |

== Transfers ==
=== Winter ===
In: Note: Flags indicate national team as defined under FIFA eligibility rules; some limited exceptions apply. Players may hold more than one non-FIFA nationality.

| No. | Pos. | Nation | Player |
|---|---|---|---|
| 3 | MF | KAZ | Yan Vorogovskiy (from (Kazakhstan) Kaisar) |
| 5 | MF | SVK | Lukáš Tesák (from (Russia) Arsenal Tula) |
| 16 | GK | KAZ | Andrei Sidelnikov (from (Kazakhstan) Ordabasy) |
| 20 | MF | CMR | Léandre Tawamba (from (Slovakia) ViOn) |
| 28 | MF | RUS | Andrey Arshavin (from (Russia) Kuban Krasnodar) |

Out: Note: Flags indicate national team as defined under FIFA eligibility rules; some limited exceptions apply. Players may hold more than one non-FIFA nationality.

| No. | Pos. | Nation | Player |
|---|---|---|---|
| 3 | DF | RUS | Zaurbek Pliyev (to (Russia) Terek Grozny) |
| 5 | DF | KAZ | Mark Gorman (to (Kazakhstan) Astana) |
| 14 | FW | KAZ | Bauyrzhan Baitana (to (Kazakhstan) Taraz) |
| 15 | FW | ESP | Sito Riera |
| 16 | GK | KAZ | Sergey Tkachuk (to (Kazakhstan) Shakhter Karagandy) |
| 22 | MF | BRA | Serginho (to (Brazil) Ceará) |
| 25 | MF | KAZ | Oybek Baltabayev |
| 26 | DF | KAZ | Bauyrzhan Tanirbergenov |
| 27 | MF | KAZ | Ulan Konysbayev (loan return to (Kazakhstan) Astana) |
| 28 | FW | SRB | Đorđe Despotović (loan return to (Serbia) Red Star Belgrade) |
| 29 | FW | KAZ | Toktar Zhangylyshbay (loan return to (Kazakhstan) Astana) |

Trialists: Note: Flags indicate national team as defined under FIFA eligibility rules; some limited exceptions apply. Players may hold more than one non-FIFA nationality.

| No. | Pos. | Nation | Player |
|---|---|---|---|
| — | MF | CMR | Louise Parfait |
| — | MF | RUS | Aleksandr Pavlenko |

=== Summer ===
In: Note: Flags indicate national team as defined under FIFA eligibility rules; some limited exceptions apply. Players may hold more than one non-FIFA nationality.

| No. | Pos. | Nation | Player |
|---|---|---|---|
| 14 | DF | ESP | César Arzo (from (Greece) AEK Athens) |
| 15 | MF | KAZ | Bauyrzhan Turysbek (from (Kazakhstan) Zhetysu) |
| 23 | DF | KAZ | Gafurzhan Suyumbayev (from (Kazakhstan) Ordabasy) |
| 27 | GK | KAZ | Stas Pokatilov (loan from (Russia) Rostov) |
| 30 | MF | CHI | Gerson Acevedo (from (Russia) Ural) |

Out: Note: Flags indicate national team as defined under FIFA eligibility rules; some limited exceptions apply. Players may hold more than one non-FIFA nationality.

| No. | Pos. | Nation | Player |
|---|---|---|---|
| 5 | MF | SVK | Lukáš Tesák (to (Russia) Arsenal Tula) |
| 18 | MF | KAZ | Vitali Li (loan to (Kazakhstan) Irtysh Pavlodar) |

=== Released ===
| Date | Position | Nationality | Name | Joined | Date | Ref. |
|---|---|---|---|---|---|---|
| 21 November 2016 | MF | (Ukraine) | Anatoliy Tymoshchuk | Retired | | |
| 1 January 2017 | GK | (Kazakhstan) | Andrei Sidelnikov | Aktobe | 1 January 2017 | |
| 1 January 2017 | MF | (Kazakhstan) | Vitali Li | Atyrau | 1 January 2017 | |
| 1 January 2017 | MF | (Kazakhstan) | Madiyar Raimbek | Taraz | 1 January 2018 | |

== Friendlies ==
| 25 January 2016 | SG Wattenscheid 09 (Germany) | 1 – 1 | (Kazakhstan) Kairat | Antalya, Turkey |
| (UTC+6) | Taşkin | Summary | Islamkhan |

| 25 January 2016 | Nyíregyháza Spartacus (Hungary) | 2 – 3 | (Kazakhstan) Kairat | Antalya, Turkey |
| (UTC+6) | Törtei; Rezes (pen.) | Summary | Gohou 30'; Bakayev; V.Li |

| 28 January 2016 | Karlstad (Sweden) | 3 – 4 | (Kazakhstan) Kairat | Antalya, Turkey |
| (UTC+6) | Yasven; Eriksen; Marcus | Summary | Gohou; Pavlenko; V.Li |

| 8 February 2016 | ViOn Zlaté Moravce (Slovakia) | 1 – 1 | (Kazakhstan) Kairat | Antalya, Turkey |
| (UTC+6) | Tawamba | Summary | Islamkhan (pen.) |

| 12 February 2016 | Zimbru Chișinău (Moldova) | 0 – 2 | (Kazakhstan) Kairat | Antalya, Turkey |
| 21:00 (UTC+6) | | Summary | Gohou; Islamkhan |

| 16 February 2016 | Sarajevo (Bosnia and Herzegovina) | 1 – 3 | (Kazakhstan) Kairat | Antalya, Turkey |
| (UTC+6) | Goal | Summary | Isael; Gohou (pen.) |

| 20 February 2016 | Milsami Orhei (Moldova) | – | (Kazakhstan) Kairat | Antalya, Turkey |
| (UTC+6) | | [ Summary] |

== Competitions ==
=== Kazakhstan Super Cup ===
| 8 March 2016 | Astana | 0 – 0 (a.e.t.) (4 – 5 p) | Kairat | Astana |
| 15:00 (UTC+6) | Cañas (yellow card) 46'; Twumasi (yellow card) 69' | Summary | Marković (yellow card) 22'; Tesák (yellow card) 90'; Tymoshchuk (yellow card) 103'; Gohou (yellow card) 106' | Stadium: Astana Arena; Attendance: 14,500; Referee: Ravshan Irmatov |
| | Penalties |
| | Cañas (penalty scored); Aničić (penalty scored); Shchotkin (penalty missed); Maksimović (penalty missed); Twumasi (penalty scored); Beisebekov (penalty scored); Postnikov (penalty missed) | | (penalty scored) Islamkhan; (penalty scored) Soares; (penalty scored) Riera; (penalty missed) V.Li; (penalty missed) Gohou; (penalty scored) Tymoshchuk; (penalty scored) Tesák |

=== Kazakhstan Premier League ===
==== Regular season ====
===== Results summary =====
| Overall | | | | | | | | Home | | | | | | Away | | | | | |
| Pld | W | D | L | GF | GA | GD | Pts | W | D | L | GF | GA | GD | W | D | L | GF | GA | GD |
|---|---|---|---|---|---|---|---|---|---|---|---|---|---|---|---|---|---|---|---|
| 22 | 14 | 3 | 5 | 50 | 22 | +28 | 45 | 9 | 1 | 1 | 29 | 9 | +20 | 5 | 2 | 4 | 21 | 13 | +8 |

Last updated: 25 July 2016.
Source: See Results

===== Results by round =====
| Round | 1 | 2 | 3 | 4 | 5 | 6 | 7 | 8 | 9 | 10 | 11 | 12 | 13 | 14 | 15 | 16 | 17 | 18 | 19 | 20 | 21 | 22 |
|---|---|---|---|---|---|---|---|---|---|---|---|---|---|---|---|---|---|---|---|---|---|---|
| Ground | A | A | A | A | H | A | H | A | H | A | H | H | H | H | A | H | A | H | A | H | A | H |
| Result | L | D | L | W | D | L | W | L | W | W | W | W | W | W | W | D | W | W | D | W | W | W |
| Position | 8 | 8 | 9 | 6 | 8 | 9 | 6 | 7 | 6 | 6 | 6 | 3 | 3 | 3 | 3 | 3 | 3 | 3 | 3 | 2 | 2 | 2 |

Source: See Results
A = Away; H = Home; W = Win; D = Draw; L = Loss

===== Results =====
| 12 March 2016 1 | Taraz | 2 – 1 | Kairat | Taraz |
| 15:00 (UTC+6) | B.Baitana (yellow card) 40'; Zyankovich 65'; Golić (yellow card) 77'; T.Danilyuk 86'; Grigorenko (yellow card) 87' | Summary | V.Li 88' | Stadium: Central Stadium; Attendance: 1,500; Referee: Igor Chesnokov |

| 19 March 2016 2 | Okzhetpes | 1 – 1 | Kairat | Astana |
| 16:00 (UTC+6) | Khairullin (yellow card) 39'; Buleshev 49' (yellow card) 59'; I.Mangutkin (yellow card) 65'; Z.Moldakaraev (yellow card) 79' | Summary | Bakayev (yellow card) 34'; Gohou 44' | Stadium: Astana Arena; Attendance: 4,000; Referee: Denis Tevyashov |

| 3 April 2016 3 | Akzhayik | 2 – 1 | Kairat | Oral |
| 16:00 (UTC+6) | Govedarica (yellow card) 3'; Hromțov (yellow card) 35'; Coronel 48' (pen.); Valiullin 62'; R.Bagautdinov (yellow card) 90+4' | Summary | Soares (yellow card) 22'; V.Li 57'; Kuat (yellow card) 90+4' | Stadium: Petr Atoyan Stadium; Attendance: 2,500; Referee: Artyom Kuchin |

| 9 April 2016 4 | Atyrau | 0 – 1 | Kairat | Atyrau |
| 16:00 (UTC+6) | | Summary | Gohou 58'; Rudoselskiy (yellow card) 69'; V.Li (yellow card) 78' | Stadium: Munaishy Stadium; Attendance: 1,500; Referee: Marat Iskakov |

| 13 April 2016 5 | Kairat | 0 – 0 | Shakhter Karagandy | Almaty |
| 19:30 (UTC+6) | Islamkhan (yellow card) 20' (yellow-red card) 75' | Summary | Yaghoubi (yellow card) 20' | Stadium: Central Stadium; Attendance: 14,500; Referee: Anatolyi Vishnichenko |

| 17 April 2016 6 | Ordabasy | 1 – 0 | Kairat | Shymkent |
| 14:00 (UTC+6) | Kasalica (yellow card) 30' (goal) 54'; E.Tungyshbaev (yellow card) 51'; Chatto (yellow card) 90+1' | Summary | Bakayev (yellow card) 23'; Marković (yellow card) 67'; Kuat (yellow card) 85' | Stadium: Kazhymukan Munaitpasov Stadium; Attendance: 7,000; Referee: Askhat Abdanbayev |

| 23 April 2016 7 | Kairat | 3 – 0 | Aktobe | Almaty |
| 18:00 (UTC+6) | Marković 42'; Arshavin 44' (yellow card) 53'; Tymoshchuk 90+2' | Summary | B.Kairov (yellow card) 17' (yellow-red card) 90+4' | Stadium: Central Stadium; Attendance: 13,000; Referee: Igor Aleshin |

| 1 May 2016 8 | Astana | 1 – 0 | Kairat | Astana |
| 15:00 (UTC+6) | Maksimović 6'; Shomko (yellow card) 29'; Muzhikov (yellow card) 43'; Despotović (yellow card) 82'; Haruna (yellow card) 90+2' | Summary | Tesák (yellow card) 47' | Stadium: Astana Arena; Attendance: 11,000; Referee: Igor Chesnokov |

| 5 May 2016 9 | Kairat | 2 – 0 | Zhetysu | Almaty |
| 19:30 (UTC+6) | Turysbek 25' (o.g.); Tawamba 72'; Bakayev (yellow card) 82' | Summary | Turysbek (yellow card) 90+2' | Stadium: Central Stadium; Attendance: 8,000; Referee: Bagdat Abdullaev |

| 10 May 2016 10 | Tobol | 1 – 2 | Kairat | Kostanay |
| 16:00 (UTC+6) | Šimkovič 8' (pen.); Žulpa (yellow card) 53' | Summary | Gohou 13', 56'; Darabayev (yellow card) 86' | Stadium: Central Stadium; Attendance: 5,000; Referee: Bolat Karlibayev |

| 15 May 2016 11 | Kairat | 1 – 0 | Irtysh Pavlodar | Almaty |
| 18:00 (UTC+6) | Isael 22'; Tymoshchuk (yellow card) 27'; V.Plotnikov (yellow card) 90+3' | Summary | Fonseca (yellow card) 25'; Malyi (yellow card) 45' (yellow-red card) 85'; Akhmetov (yellow card) 55'; Aliev (yellow card) 77' | Stadium: Central Stadium; Attendance: 12,500; Referee: Aryom Kuchin |

| 21 May 2016 12 | Kairat | 6 – 0 | Okzhetpes | Almaty |
| 18:00 (UTC+6) | Marković (yellow card) 21'; Arshavin 28', 52' (yellow card) 33'; Islamkhan (yellow card) 41' (goal) 54', 68' (pen.); Gohou 82', 85' | Summary | Stamenković (yellow card) 67'; Yurin (yellow card) 76'; A.Kuksin (yellow card) 80' | Stadium: Central Stadium; Attendance: 6,500; Referee: Denis Tevyashov |

| 29 May 2016 13 | Kairat | 3 – 2 | Akzhayik | Almaty |
| 18:00 (UTC+6) | Islamkhan 16' (pen.); Kuat (yellow card) 55'; Gohou 89'; Tawamba 90+2' | Summary | Valiullin 3'; Hromțov (yellow card) 22' (goal) 31'; B.Omarov (yellow card) 36'; A.Shurygin (yellow card) 37'; R.Bagautdinov (yellow card) 81'; A.Maltsev (yellow card) 85' | Stadium: Central Stadium; Attendance: 8,000; Referee: Furkat Atajanow |

| 2 June 2016 14 | Kairat | 5 – 2 | Atyrau | Almaty |
| 20:00 (UTC+6) | Rudoselskiy (yellow card) 19'; Islamkhan 22', 65'; Isael 28'; Arshavin 45+1'; Gohou 85' | Summary | Trytko (yellow card) 15'; Arzhanov 17'; R.Esatov (yellow card) 24'; Curtean 87'; A.Saparov (yellow card) 90+2' | Stadium: Central Stadium; Attendance: 8,500; Referee: Ruslan Duzmambetov |

| 11 June 2016 15 | Shakhter Karagandy | 0 – 5 | Kairat | Karaganda |
| 17:00 (UTC+6) | Ubbink (yellow card) 70'; Zeneli (yellow card) 70' | Summary | Isael 35'; Gohou 47'; Darabayev 58'; V.Plotnikov (yellow card) 70'; Kuat (yellow card) 70'; Islamkhan 90' (pen.), 90+2' | Stadium: Shakhter Stadium; Attendance: 4,500; Referee: Bagdat Abdullaev |

| 15 June 2016 16 | Kairat | 2 – 2 | Ordabasy | Almaty |
| 20:00 (UTC+6) | Arshavin (yellow card) 28'; Isael (yellow card) 39'; Marković (yellow card) 56' (goal) 85'; Gohou 68'; Islamkhan (yellow card) 72' | Summary | M.Tolebek 3'; Simčević 50' | Stadium: Central Stadium; Attendance: 9,500; Referee: Denis Izmailov |

| 19 June 2016 17 | Aktobe | 2 – 6 | Kairat | Aktobe |
| 20:00 (UTC+6) | Shestakov 43'; D.Zhalmukan 64' (pen.); Kouadja (yellow card) 85' | Summary | Tesák 4'; Islamkhan 17'; Gohou 25', 65'; Arshavin 38'; Isael 77' | Stadium: Central Stadium; Attendance: 6,000; Referee: Artyom Kuchin |

| 23 June 2016 18 | Kairat | 1 – 0 | Astana | Almaty |
| 20:00 (UTC+6) | Muzhikov (yellow card) 23'; Postnikov (yellow card) 68' | Summary | Gohou 11'; Arshavin (yellow card) 45+3'; Marković (yellow card) 81' | Stadium: Central Stadium; Attendance: 19,000; Referee: Ruslan Duzmambetov |

| 3 July 2016 19 | Zhetysu | 1 – 1 | Kairat | Taldykorgan |
| 18:00 (UTC+6) | Savić 37'; Kadio (yellow card) 73' | Summary | Tesák (yellow card) 77'; Isael (yellow card) 80'; Gohou 90' | Stadium: Zhetysu Stadium; Attendance: 2,000; Referee: Viktor Antonov |

| 10 July 2016 20 | Kairat | 3 – 2 | Tobol | Almaty |
| 20:00 (UTC+6) | Islamkhan 49'; Kuat 60'; Tymoshchuk (yellow card) 67'; Isael 72' | Summary | Žulpa 68'; Gorman (yellow card) 69'; Khizhnichenko 76'; Glavina (yellow card) 90+3' | Stadium: Central Stadium; Attendance: 6,500; Referee: Aleksandr Gauzer |

| 17 July 2016 21 | Irtysh Pavlodar | 2 – 3 | Kairat | Pavlodar |
| 19:00 (UTC+6) | Kerla 5'; R.Murtazayev 45+1'; R.Yesimov (yellow card) 51'; Aliev (yellow card) 75' | Summary | Kuat (yellow card) 6'; Islamkhan 16' (pen.); Tawamba 22', 39'; Pokatilov (yellow card) 45+1' | Stadium: Central Stadium; Attendance: 8,700; Referee: Artyom Kuchin |

| 24 July 2016 22 | Kairat | 3 – 1 | Taraz | Almaty |
| 20:00 (UTC+6) | Islamkhan 10'; Arshavin 41'; Marković (yellow card) 56'; Kuat (yellow card) 84'; Gohou 90+3' | Summary | Mera (yellow card) 9'; Tazhimbetov 19' | Stadium: Central Stadium; Attendance: 7,500; Referee: Marat Iskakov |

===== League table =====
| Pos | Team | Pld | W | D | L | GF | GA | GD | Pts | Qualification |
|---|---|---|---|---|---|---|---|---|---|---|
| 1 | Astana | 22 | 17 | 2 | 3 | 34 | 14 | +20 | 53 | Qualification for the championship round |
| 2 | Kairat | 22 | 14 | 4 | 4 | 50 | 22 | +28 | 46 | Qualification for the championship round |
| 3 | Irtysh Pavlodar | 22 | 12 | 5 | 5 | 37 | 18 | +19 | 41 | Qualification for the championship round |
| 4 | Okzhetpes | 22 | 11 | 4 | 7 | 33 | 23 | +10 | 37 | Qualification for the championship round |
| 5 | Ordabasy | 22 | 9 | 6 | 7 | 26 | 27 | −1 | 33 | Qualification for the championship round |

Source: UEFA.com, Soccerway
Rules for classification: 1) Points; 2) Head-to-head points; 3) Head-to-head matches won; 4) Head-to-head goal difference; 5) Head-to-head goals scored; 6) Head-to-head away goals scored; 7) Goal difference; 8) Matches won; 9) Goals scored; 10) Away goals scored; 11) Draw.

==== Championship round ====
===== Results summary =====
| Overall | | | | | | | | Home | | | | | | Away | | | | | |
| Pld | W | D | L | GF | GA | GD | Pts | W | D | L | GF | GA | GD | W | D | L | GF | GA | GD |
|---|---|---|---|---|---|---|---|---|---|---|---|---|---|---|---|---|---|---|---|
| 10 | 8 | 1 | 1 | 25 | 8 | +17 | 25 | 4 | 1 | 0 | 13 | 3 | +10 | 4 | 0 | 1 | 12 | 5 | +7 |

Last updated: 31 October 2016.
Source: See Results

===== Results by round =====
| Round | 1 | 2 | 3 | 4 | 5 | 6 | 7 | 8 | 9 | 10 |
|---|---|---|---|---|---|---|---|---|---|---|
| Ground | A | H | A | A | H | A | H | H | A | H |
| Result | W | W | L | W | W | W | D | W | W | W |
| Position | 2 | 2 | 2 | 2 | 2 | 2 | 2 | 2 | 2 | 2 |

Source: See Results
A = Away; H = Home; W = Win; D = Draw; L = Loss

===== Results =====
| 13 August 2016 1 | Okzhetpes | 1 – 3 | Kairat | Kokshetau |
| 17:00 (UTC+6) | Canales 45+1'; M.Tuliyev (yellow card) 90'; Kozhamberdi (yellow card) 90+3' | Summary | Islamkhan 17' (pen.); Gohou (yellow card) 28'; Arzo (yellow card) 43'; Isael 55'; Suyumbayev (yellow card) 75'; Acevedo 90+4' | Stadium: Okzhetpes Stadium; Attendance: 3,000; Referee: Artyom Kuchin |

| 20 August 2016 2 | Kairat | 3 – 1 | Aktobe | Almaty |
| 20:00 (UTC+6) | Islamkhan 48' (pen.); Suyumbayev 62'; Gohou 65' | Summary | Shchotkin 31' | Stadium: Central Stadium; Attendance: 10,000; Referee: Anatolyi Vishnichenko |

| 26 August 2016 3 | Ordabasy | 2 – 1 | Kairat | Shymkent |
| 17:30 (UTC+6) | E.Tungyshbaev (yellow card) 40'; Geynrikh 47'; Martsvaladze 64'; Gogua (yellow card) 84' | Summary | Kuat 55' | Stadium: Kazhymukan Munaitpasov Stadium; Attendance: 4,000; Referee: Igor Chesnokov |

| 10 September 2016 4 | Astana | 1 – 4 | Kairat | Astana |
| 17:00 (UTC+6) | Nurgaliev (yellow card) 54'; Aničić (yellow card) 59'; Despotović 71' (yellow card) 87'; Nusserbayev (yellow card) 74' | Summary | Acevedo 5'; Islamkhan 62'; Gohou 68'; Arshavin 76'; Suyumbayev (yellow card) 90+2' | Stadium: Astana Arena; Attendance: 6,000; Referee: Ruslan Duzmambetov |

| 17 September 2016 5 | Kairat | 2 – 1 | Irtysh Pavlodar | Almaty |
| 18:00 (UTC+6) | Gohou 23'; Islamkhan 81' | Summary | Fonseca (yellow card) 30'; Grigalashvili 78' (yellow card) 90' | Stadium: Central Stadium; Attendance: 8,800; Referee: Askhat Abdanbayev |

| 25 September 2016 6 | Aktobe | 0 – 1 | Kairat | Aktobe |
| 20:00 (UTC+6) | B.Kairov (yellow card) 9'; Sitdikov (yellow card) 70'; Sorokin (yellow card) 90' | Summary | Kuat (yellow card) 26'; Arshavin 35'; Darabayev (yellow card) 90' | Stadium: Central Stadium; Attendance: 7,500; Referee: Anatolyi Vishnichenko |

| 1 October 2016 7 | Kairat | 1 – 1 | Ordabasy | Almaty |
| 18:00 (UTC+6) | Gohou 19'; Arzo (yellow card) 36'; Tymoshchuk (yellow card) 45+2'; Suyumbayev (yellow card) 90+3' | Summary | E.Tungyshbaev 35' (yellow card) 55'; Chatto (yellow card) 90+3'; A.Bekbaev (yellow card) 90+4' | Stadium: Central Stadium; Attendance: 8,500; Referee: Denis Izmailov |

| 16 October 2016 8 | Kariat | 2 – 0 | Astana | Almaty |
| 18:00 (UTC+6) | Kuat (yellow card) 13' (goal) 35'; Arzo 29'; Marković 58' | Summary | A.Tagybergen (yellow card) 22'; Nurgaliev (yellow card) 25'; Malyi (yellow card) 72' | Stadium: Central Stadium; Attendance: 17,500; Referee: Ruslan Duzmambetov |

| 23 October 2016 9 | Irtysh Pavlodar | 1 – 3 | Kairat | Pavlodar |
| 15:00 (UTC+6) | Fonseca 85' | Summary | Islamkhan (yellow card) 24' (goal) 67'; Gohou 54', 90+3' (yellow card) 76'; Arshavin (yellow card) 62' | Stadium: Central Stadium; Attendance: 4,000; Referee: Bagdat Abdullaev |

| 29 October 2016 10 | Kairat | 5 – 0 | Okzhetpes | Almaty |
| 15:00 (UTC+6) | Gohou 1'; Tymoshchuk (yellow card) 35'; Isael (yellow card) 38' (goal) 46'; Islamkhan 49'; Suyumbayev (yellow card) 53' (goal) 86'; Kuat 67' | Summary | Chyzhov (yellow card) 73' | Stadium: Central Stadium; Attendance: 6,800; Referee: Artyom Kuchin |

===== League table =====
| Pos | Team | Pld | W | D | L | GF | GA | GD | Pts | Qualification |
|---|---|---|---|---|---|---|---|---|---|---|
| 1 | Astana (C) | 32 | 23 | 4 | 5 | 47 | 21 | +26 | 73 | Qualification for the Champions League second qualifying round (Note: Astana qualified for the Europa League first qualifying round by winning the 2016 Kazakhstan Cup. However, since they already qualified for European competition based on their league position, the spot awarded to the cup winners was passed down the league.) |
| 2 | Kairat | 32 | 22 | 5 | 5 | 75 | 30 | +45 | 71 | Qualification for the Europa League first qualifying round |
| 3 | Irtysh Pavlodar | 32 | 14 | 7 | 11 | 52 | 36 | +16 | 49 | Qualification for the Europa League first qualifying round |
| 4 | Ordabasy | 32 | 13 | 9 | 10 | 41 | 44 | −3 | 48 | Qualification for the Europa League first qualifying round |
| 5 | Okzhetpes | 32 | 13 | 6 | 13 | 42 | 44 | −2 | 45 | |
| 6 | Aktobe | 32 | 9 | 9 | 14 | 37 | 52 | −15 | 36 | |

Source: Soccerway
Rules for classification: 1) Points; 2) Play-off (only if deciding champion when two teams are tied); 3) Head-to-head points; 4) Head-to-head matches won; 5) Head-to-head goal difference; 6) Head-to-head goals scored; 7) Head-to-head away goals scored; 8) Goal difference; 9) Matches won; 10) Goals scored; 11) Away goals scored; 12) Draw.
(C) Champions

=== Kazakhstan Cup ===
| 27 April 2016 Last 16 | Kairat | 4 – 0 | Shakhter Karagandy | Almaty |
| 19:30 (UTC+6) | Marković (yellow card) 39'; Tawamba 77'; Kuat 83'; Isael 90+2'; Darabayev 90+3' | Summary | | Stadium: Central Stadium; Attendance: 8,700; Referee: Daniyar Sakhi |

| 25 May 2016 Quarterfinal | Zhetysu | 0 – 2 | Kairat | Taldykorgan |
| 17:30 (UTC+6) | Đalović (yellow card) 82' | Summary | Lunin 4'; Đalović 14' (o.g.) | Stadium: Zhetysu Stadium; Attendance: 3,000; Referee: Viktor Antonov |

| 21 September 2016 Semifinal 1st leg | Kairat | 1 – 0 | Atyrau | Almaty |
| 19:30 (UTC+6) | Kuat 72'; Marković (yellow card) 78' | Summary | A.Saparov (yellow card) 44' | Stadium: Central Stadium; Attendance: 7,000; Referee: Bolat Karlibayev |

| 5 November 2016 Semifinal 2nd leg | Atyrau | 0 – 3 (0 – 4 agg.) | Kairat | Atyrau |
| 15:00 (UTC+6) | Curtean (yellow card) 23'; Muldarov (yellow card) 40'; Essame (yellow card) 73'; R.Nurmukhametov (yellow card) 90+1' | Summary | Suyumbayev 2'; Arshavin 65'; Bakayev (yellow card) 84'; Turysbek (yellow card) 85' (yellow-red card) 88'; Acevedo 90+2' | Stadium: Munaishy Stadium; Attendance: 4,000; Referee: Igor Aleshin |

==== Final ====
| 19 November 2016 | Kairat | 0 – 1 | Astana | Almaty |
| 15:00 (UTC+6) | Marković (yellow card) 90+5' | Summary | Kabananga 47' | Stadium: Central Stadium; Referee: Ruslan Duzmambetov |

=== UEFA Europa League ===
==== Qualifying rounds ====
| 1 July 2016 First qualifying round 1st leg | Teuta Durrës (Albania) | 0 – 1 | (Kazakhstan) Kairat | Durrës, Albania |
| 01:00 (UTC+6) | Hoxha (yellow card) 57' | Report | Bakayev (yellow card) 32'; Arshavin 70' | Stadium: Niko Dovana Stadium; Attendance: 500; Referee: Vasilis Dimitriou (Cyprus) |

| 7 July 2016 First qualifying round 2nd leg | Kairat (Kazakhstan) | 5 – 0 (6 – 0 agg.) | (Albania) Teuta Durrës | Almaty, Kazakhstan |
| 20:45 (UTC+6) | Gohou 27', 61'; Bakayev 45+2'; Tawamba 72'; Turysbek 79' | Report | | Stadium: Central Stadium; Attendance: 20,700; Referee: Dag Vidar Hafsås (Norway) |

| 14 July 2016 Second qualifying round 1st leg | Kairat (Kazakhstan) | 1 – 1 | (Israel) Maccabi Tel Aviv | Almaty, Kazakhstan |
| 20:45 (UTC+6) | Arshavin 29'; Marković (yellow card) 59'; Islamkhan (red card) 90+4' | Report | Alberman (yellow card) 55'; Benayoun 90+1' | Stadium: Central Stadium; Referee: Antti Munukka (Finland) |

| 21 July 2016 Second qualifying round 2nd leg | Maccabi Tel Aviv (Israel) | 2 – 1 (3 – 2 agg.) | (Kazakhstan) Kairat | Netanya (Note: Maccabi Tel Aviv play their home matches at Netanya Stadium, Netanya, instead of their regular stadium Bloomfield Stadium, Tel Aviv, due to reconstruction.), Israel |
| 23:00 (UTC+6) | Ben Haim II 5' (yellow card) 22'; Igiebor (yellow card) 41'; Ben Haim (yellow card) 83'; Alberman 86'; Rajković (yellow card) 90+2'; Micha (yellow card) 90+3' | Report | Lunin (yellow card) 24'; Gohou (yellow card) 53' (goal) 64'; Kuat (yellow card) 59' | Stadium: Netanya Stadium; Referee: Tiago Martins (Portugal) |

== Squad statistics ==
As of Match played 19 November 2016

=== Appearances and goals ===
| No. | Pos | Nat | Player | Total | | Premier League | | Kazakhstan Cup | | Kazakhstan Super Cup | | UEFA Europa League | |
| No. | Pos | Nat | Player | Apps | Goals | Apps | Goals | Apps | Goals | Apps | Goals | Apps | Goals |
|---|---|---|---|---|---|---|---|---|---|---|---|---|---|
| 1 | GK | (Kazakhstan) KAZ | Vladimir Plotnikov | 31 | 0 | 23+1 | 0 | 2 | 0 | 1 | 0 | 4 | 0 |
| 2 | DF | (Kazakhstan) KAZ | Timur Rudoselskiy | 25 | 0 | 18+4 | 0 | 3 | 0 | 0 | 0 | 0 | 0 |
| 3 | MF | (Kazakhstan) KAZ | Yan Vorogovskiy | 9 | 0 | 1+5 | 0 | 0+2 | 0 | 0 | 0 | 1 | 0 |
| 4 | DF | (Brazil) BRA | Bruno Soares | 3 | 0 | 2 | 0 | 0 | 0 | 1 | 0 | 0 | 0 |
| 6 | DF | (Serbia) SRB | Žarko Marković | 37 | 2 | 28 | 2 | 4 | 0 | 1 | 0 | 4 | 0 |
| 7 | MF | (Kazakhstan) KAZ | Islambek Kuat | 36 | 6 | 20+7 | 4 | 3+1 | 2 | 1 | 0 | 1+3 | 0 |
| 8 | MF | (Russia) RUS | Mikhail Bakayev | 39 | 1 | 25+4 | 0 | 5 | 0 | 1 | 0 | 4 | 1 |
| 9 | MF | (Kazakhstan) KAZ | Bauyrzhan Islamkhan | 40 | 17 | 30+1 | 17 | 5 | 0 | 1 | 0 | 3 | 0 |
| 10 | MF | (Brazil) BRA | Isael | 39 | 8 | 27+2 | 7 | 5 | 1 | 1 | 0 | 4 | 0 |
| 11 | FW | (Ivory Coast) CIV | Gerard Gohou | 38 | 25 | 26+3 | 22 | 4 | 0 | 1 | 0 | 4 | 3 |
| 13 | DF | (Kazakhstan) KAZ | Yermek Kuantayev | 22 | 0 | 14+2 | 0 | 2 | 0 | 1 | 0 | 2+1 | 0 |
| 14 | DF | (Spain) ESP | César Arzo | 16 | 1 | 12 | 1 | 3 | 0 | 0 | 0 | 1 | 0 |
| 15 | MF | (Kazakhstan) KAZ | Bauyrzhan Turysbek | 12 | 1 | 0+9 | 0 | 0+2 | 0 | 0 | 0 | 0+1 | 1 |
| 16 | GK | (Kazakhstan) KAZ | Andrei Sidelnikov | 1 | 0 | 1 | 0 | 0 | 0 | 0 | 0 | 0 | 0 |
| 17 | MF | (Kazakhstan) KAZ | Aslan Darabayev | 19 | 2 | 6+10 | 1 | 1+1 | 1 | 1 | 0 | 0 | 0 |
| 19 | MF | (Kazakhstan) KAZ | Stanislav Lunin | 27 | 1 | 15+6 | 0 | 1+1 | 1 | 0 | 0 | 4 | 0 |
| 20 | FW | (Cameroon) CMR | Léandre Tawamba | 28 | 6 | 6+16 | 4 | 1+1 | 1 | 0 | 0 | 0+4 | 1 |
| 21 | MF | (Kazakhstan) KAZ | Nurlan Dairov | 3 | 0 | 1+2 | 0 | 0 | 0 | 0 | 0 | 0 | 0 |
| 22 | MF | (Kazakhstan) KAZ | Madiyar Raimbek | 1 | 0 | 0+1 | 0 | 0 | 0 | 0 | 0 | 0 | 0 |
| 23 | DF | (Kazakhstan) KAZ | Gafurzhan Suyumbayev | 18 | 3 | 13 | 2 | 3 | 1 | 0 | 0 | 2 | 0 |
| 24 | FW | (Kazakhstan) KAZ | Rifat Nurmugamet | 1 | 0 | 0 | 0 | 0+1 | 0 | 0 | 0 | 0 | 0 |
| 27 | GK | (Kazakhstan) KAZ | Stas Pokatilov | 11 | 0 | 8 | 0 | 3 | 0 | 0 | 0 | 0 | 0 |
| 28 | MF | (Russia) RUS | Andrey Arshavin | 37 | 11 | 25+3 | 8 | 5 | 1 | 0 | 0 | 4 | 2 |
| 30 | MF | (Chile) CHI | Gerson Acevedo | 16 | 3 | 6+5 | 2 | 0+2 | 1 | 0 | 0 | 1+2 | 0 |
| 44 | FW | (Ukraine) UKR | Anatoliy Tymoshchuk | 33 | 1 | 24 | 1 | 4 | 0 | 1 | 0 | 4 | 0 |
Players away from Kairat on loan:
| 18 | MF | (Kazakhstan) KAZ | Vitali Li | 13 | 2 | 2+9 | 2 | 0+1 | 0 | 0+1 | 0 | 0 | 0 |
Players who left Kairat during the season:
| 5 | MF | (Slovakia) SVK | Lukáš Tesák | 21 | 1 | 18 | 1 | 1 | 0 | 1 | 0 | 1 | 0 |
| 15 | FW | (Spain) ESP | Sito Riera | 3 | 0 | 1+1 | 0 | 0 | 0 | 0+1 | 0 | 0 | 0 |

=== Goal scorers ===
| Place | Position | Nation | Number | Name | Premier League | Kazakhstan Cup | Kazakhstan Super Cup | UEFA Europa League | Total |
|---|---|---|---|---|---|---|---|---|---|
| 1 | FW | (Ivory Coast) | 11 | Gerard Gohou | 22 | 0 | 0 | 3 | 25 |
| 2 | MF | (Kazakhstan) | 9 | Bauyrzhan Islamkhan | 17 | 0 | 0 | 0 | 17 |
| 3 | MF | (Russia) | 28 | Andrey Arshavin | 8 | 1 | 0 | 2 | 11 |
| 4 | MF | (Brazil) | 10 | Isael | 7 | 1 | 0 | 0 | 8 |
| 5 | FW | (Cameroon) | 20 | Léandre Tawamba | 4 | 1 | 0 | 1 | 6 |
| 6 | MF | (Kazakhstan) | 7 | Islambek Kuat | 4 | 2 | 0 | 0 | 6 |
| 7 | MF | (Chile) | 30 | Gerson Acevedo | 2 | 1 | 0 | 0 | 3 |
| 7 | DF | (Kazakhstan) | 23 | Gafurzhan Suyumbayev | 2 | 1 | 0 | 0 | 3 |
| 9 | FW | (Kazakhstan) | 18 | Vitali Li | 2 | 0 | 0 | 0 | 2 |
| 9 | DF | (Serbia) | 6 | Žarko Marković | 2 | 0 | 0 | 0 | 2 |
| 9 | MF | (Kazakhstan) | 17 | Aslan Darabayev | 1 | 1 | 0 | 0 | 2 |
| 9 | | | | Own goal | 1 | 1 | 0 | 0 | 2 |
| 13 | MF | (Ukraine) | 44 | Anatoliy Tymoshchuk | 1 | 0 | 0 | 0 | 1 |
| 13 | MF | (Slovakia) | 5 | Lukáš Tesák | 1 | 0 | 0 | 0 | 1 |
| 13 | DF | (Spain) | 14 | César Arzo | 1 | 0 | 0 | 0 | 1 |
| 13 | MF | (Kazakhstan) | 19 | Stanislav Lunin | 0 | 1 | 0 | 0 | 1 |
| 13 | MF | (Russia) | 8 | Mikhail Bakayev | 0 | 0 | 0 | 1 | 1 |
| 13 | MF | (Kazakhstan) | 15 | Bauyrzhan Turysbek | 0 | 0 | 0 | 1 | 1 |
| | | | | TOTALS | 75 | 10 | 0 | 8 | 93 |

=== Disciplinary record ===
| Number | Nation | Position | Name | Premier League | | Kazakhstan Cup | | Kazakhstan Super Cup | | UEFA Europa League | | Total | |
| Number | Nation | Position | Name | Yellow card | Red card | Yellow card | Red card | Yellow card | Red card | Yellow card | Red card | Yellow card | Red card |
| 1 | (Kazakhstan) | GK | Vladimir Plotnikov | 2 | 0 | 0 | 0 | 0 | 0 | 0 | 0 | 2 | 0 |
| 2 | (Kazakhstan) | DF | Timur Rudoselskiy | 2 | 0 | 0 | 0 | 0 | 0 | 0 | 0 | 2 | 0 |
| 4 | (Brazil) | DF | Bruno Soares | 1 | 0 | 0 | 0 | 0 | 0 | 0 | 0 | 1 | 0 |
| 5 | (Slovakia) | MF | Lukáš Tesák | 2 | 0 | 0 | 0 | 1 | 0 | 0 | 0 | 3 | 0 |
| 6 | (Serbia) | DF | Žarko Marković | 6 | 0 | 3 | 0 | 1 | 0 | 1 | 0 | 11 | 0 |
| 7 | (Kazakhstan) | MF | Islambek Kuat | 8 | 0 | 0 | 0 | 0 | 0 | 1 | 0 | 9 | 0 |
| 8 | (Russia) | MF | Mikhail Bakayev | 3 | 0 | 1 | 0 | 0 | 0 | 1 | 0 | 5 | 0 |
| 9 | (Kazakhstan) | MF | Bauyrzhan Islamkhan | 5 | 1 | 0 | 0 | 0 | 0 | 0 | 1 | 5 | 2 |
| 10 | (Kazakhstan) | MF | Isael | 3 | 0 | 0 | 0 | 0 | 0 | 0 | 0 | 3 | 0 |
| 11 | (Ivory Coast) | FW | Gerard Gohou | 2 | 0 | 0 | 0 | 1 | 0 | 1 | 0 | 4 | 0 |
| 14 | (Spain) | DF | César Arzo | 2 | 0 | 0 | 0 | 0 | 0 | 0 | 0 | 2 | 0 |
| 15 | (Kazakhstan) | MF | Bauyrzhan Turysbek | 0 | 0 | 2 | 1 | 0 | 0 | 0 | 0 | 2 | 1 |
| 17 | (Kazakhstan) | MF | Aslan Darabayev | 2 | 0 | 0 | 0 | 0 | 0 | 0 | 0 | 2 | 0 |
| 18 | (Kazakhstan) | MF | Vitali Li | 1 | 0 | 0 | 0 | 0 | 0 | 0 | 0 | 1 | 0 |
| 19 | (Kazakhstan) | MF | Stanislav Lunin | 0 | 0 | 0 | 0 | 0 | 0 | 1 | 0 | 1 | 0 |
| 23 | (Kazakhstan) | DF | Gafurzhan Suyumbayev | 4 | 0 | 0 | 0 | 0 | 0 | 0 | 0 | 4 | 0 |
| 27 | (Kazakhstan) | GK | Stas Pokatilov | 1 | 0 | 0 | 0 | 0 | 0 | 0 | 0 | 1 | 0 |
| 28 | (Russia) | FW | Andrey Arshavin | 5 | 0 | 0 | 0 | 0 | 0 | 0 | 0 | 5 | 0 |
| 44 | (Ukraine) | MF | Anatoliy Tymoshchuk | 4 | 0 | 0 | 0 | 1 | 0 | 0 | 0 | 5 | 0 |
| | | | TOTALS | 54 | 1 | 5 | 1 | 4 | 0 | 5 | 1 | 68 | 3 |
