= Bauyrzhan Islamkhan =

Kazakhstani footballer

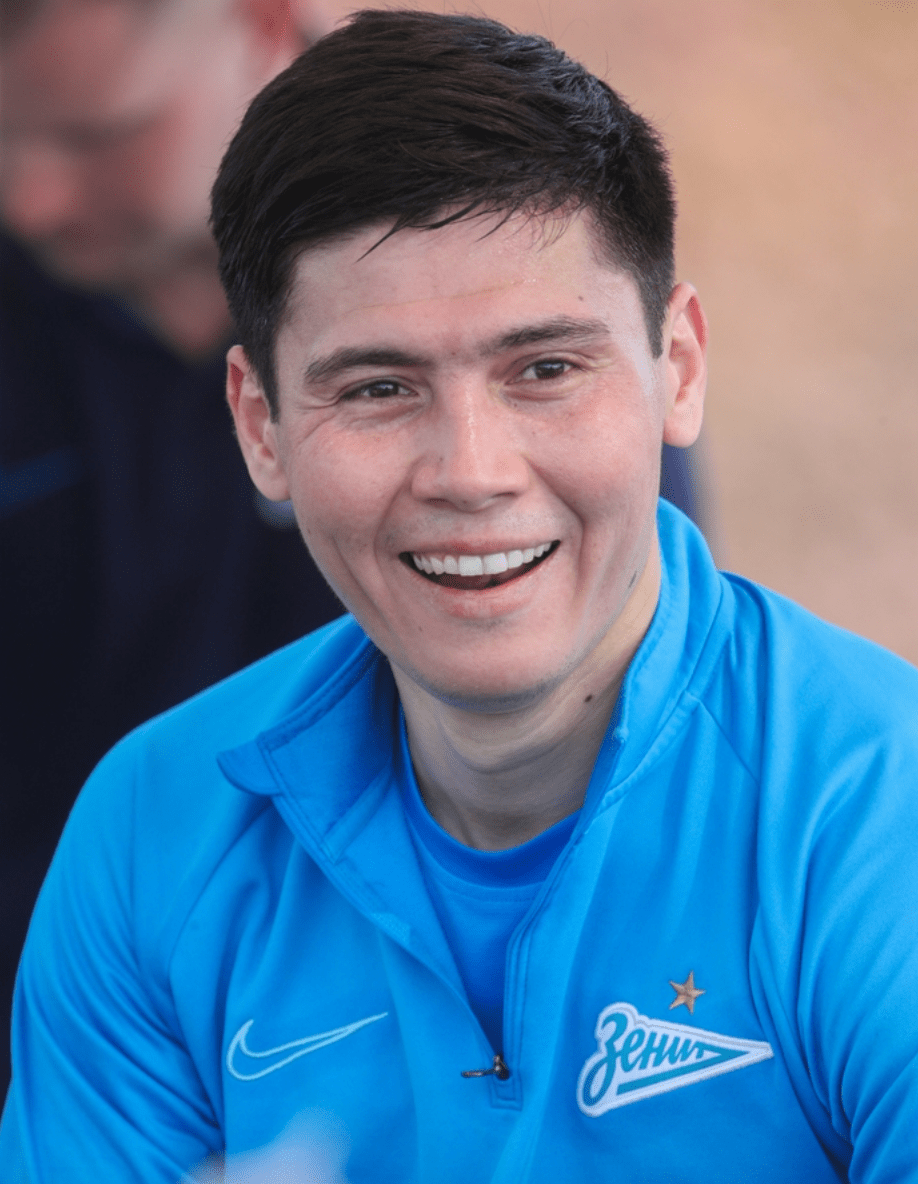
- Islamkhan in 2020

Personal information
- Full name: Bauyrzhan Yerbosynuly Islamkhan
- Date of birth: 23 February 1993 (age 33)
- Place of birth: Taraz, Kazakhstan
- Height: 1.74 m (5 ft 9 in)
- Position: Attacking midfielder

Team information
- Current team: Astana
- Number: 9

Youth career
- 2009–2011: Taraz

Senior career*
Years	Team	Apps	(Gls)
2011–2013	Taraz	49	(6)
2013–2014	Kuban Krasnodar	0	(0)
2013	→ Astana (loan)	7	(1)
2014–2019	Kairat	169	(50)
2020–2021	Al Ain	10	(0)
2023–2024	Ordabasy	30	(3)
2025	Turan	0	(0)
2025–	Astana	29	(3)

International career^{‡}
2011	Kazakhstan U19	1	(0)
2012–2014	Kazakhstan U21	24	(6)
2012–	Kazakhstan	60	(4)
- * Club domestic league appearances and goals as of 1 November 2026 ‡ National team caps and goals as of 18 November 2026

Bauyrzhan Yerbosynuly Islamkhan (Kazakh: Бауыржан Ербосынұлы Исламхан, romanized: Bauyrjan Erbosynūly İslamhan; born 23 February 1993) is a Kazakh professional footballer who plays as an attacking midfielder for Kazakhstan Premier League club Astana and the Kazakhstan national team. In the past he served as a captain for the Kazakhstan under-21 team. He is also a 6-time vice-champion of Kazakhstan and 4-time winner of the country cup.

== Club career ==
=== Taraz ===
Islamkhan came up through the youth academy of Taraz football club and impressed from an early age. He made his first team debut on 6 March 2011 in the Kazakhstan Premier League match against Irtysh, at the age of 18, and since then was a member of the Taraz's first-team squad. Next season he became the captain of the club when he was just 19 years old. He also scored six goals during his stay in Taraz. In 2012 season in the Premier League, Islamkhan recorded 22 appearances and scored 4 goals. Islamkhan has earned the Kazakhstan Football Federation's Young Player of the Year award as voted on by the coaches for his performances in his campaign for Taraz during the 2012 season.

=== Kuban Krasnodar ===
On his birthday in 2013, he signed a three-year deal with Kuban Krasnodar. He made his debut on 25 February 2013 in a friendly game against Torpedo Armavir. However, he did not play for them in the Russian Premier League and stayed there a half-year playing for their second team.

==== Loan to Astana ====
On 6 June 2013, he joined Astana on a season-long loan deal. During his playing for Astana, he appeared in seven matches and scored one goal. On 4 July 2013, he made his debut in the UEFA Europa League, coming on as a substitute in the 62nd minute in a first qualifying round match against Botev Plovdiv.

=== Kairat ===
On 11 February 2014, a transfer deal was made between the teams FC Kuban Krasnodar and FC Kairat after that he signed a three-year deal with Kairat. In the end of July, 2016 he got an offer from the champions and the leading team of Kazakhstan Premier League at that moment, FC Astana, to join the team when the contract with FC Kairat expires. However, it was rejected by the footballer. Islamkhan left Kairat at the end of the 2019 season after his contract expired. Following his release from Kairat, Islamkhan joined Zenit St.Petersburg on trial during their January training camp in Qatar.

=== Al Ain ===
On 31 January 2020, he signed for UAE side Al Ain until the end of 2019–20 season.

In December 2020, Islamkhan was handed a two-year ban from football after testing positive for a banned substance after an Al Ain game in the AFC Champions League during September 2020.

=== Astana ===
On 26 July 2025, Astana announced the signing of Islamkhan on a contract until the end of the 2025 season.

== International career ==
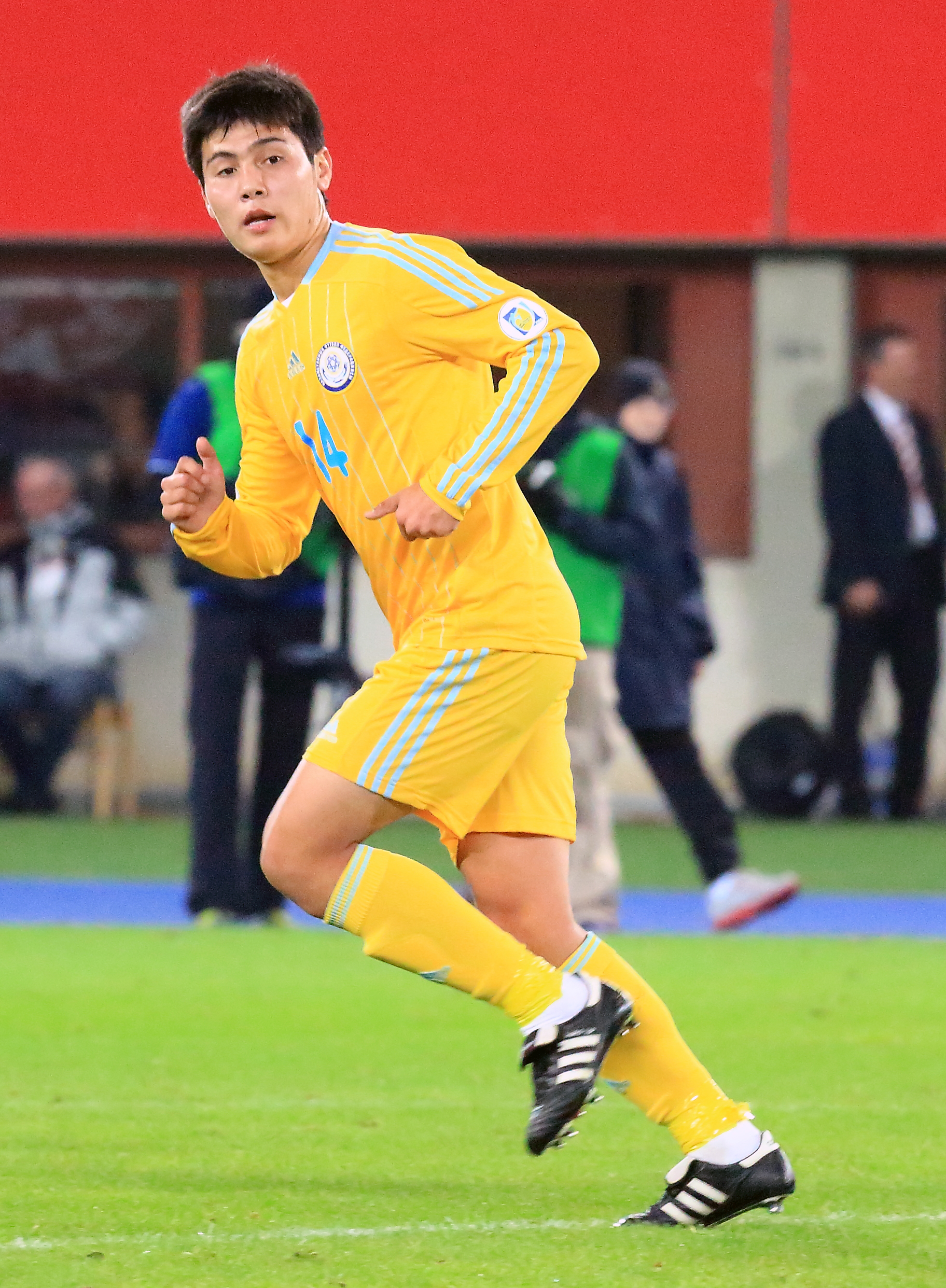
Islamkhan playing against Austria in a World Cup qualification game in 2012.

Islamkhan made his international debut for Kazakhstan in a friendly game against Latvia on 29 February 2012. During 2014 FIFA World Cup qualification tournament, Islamkhan played two times coming on as a substitute in matches against Sweden and Austria.

In November 2022, after completing a two-year suspension, Bauyrzhan Islamkhan received a call-up to the Kazakhstan national team for friendly matches against Uzbekistan and the UAE.

== Career statistics ==
=== Club ===
As of match played 11 February 2020.

Appearances and goals by club, season and competition
Club	Season	League			National Cup		Continental		Other		Total	
Club	Season	Division	Apps	Goals	Apps	Goals	Apps	Goals	Apps	Goals	Apps	Goals
Taraz	2011	Kazakhstan Premier League	27	2	5	2	–		–		32	4
Taraz	2012	Kazakhstan Premier League	22	4	3	0	–		–		25	4
Taraz	Total		49	6	8	2	-	-	-	-	57	8
Kuban Krasnodar	2012–13	Russian Premier League	0	0	0	0	–		–		0	0
Kuban Krasnodar	2013–14	Russian Premier League	0	0	0	0	–		–		0	0
Kuban Krasnodar	Total		0	0	0	0	-	-	-	-	0	0
Astana (loan)	2013	Kazakhstan Premier League	7	1	0	0	1	0	–		8	1
Kairat	2014	Kazakhstan Premier League	31	5	5	1	4	0	–		40	6
Kairat	2015	Kazakhstan Premier League	29	7	3	2	8	3	1	0	41	12
Kairat	2016	Kazakhstan Premier League	31	17	5	0	3	0	1	0	40	17
Kairat	2017	Kazakhstan Premier League	27	11	4	1	2	0	1	0	34	12
Kairat	2018	Kazakhstan Premier League	19	3	3	4	6	3	1	0	29	10
Kairat	2019	Kazakhstan Premier League	22	7	1	0	4	0	0	0	27	7
Kairat	Total		159	50	21	8	27	6	4	0	211	64
Al Ain	2019–20	UAE Pro League	6	0	0	0	6	0	–		12	0
Al Ain	2020–21	UAE Pro League	4	0	0	0	0	0	–		4	0
Al Ain	Total		10	0	0	0	6	0	0	0	16	0
Career total			225	57	29	10	34	6	4	0	292	73

=== International ===
As of match played 6 January 2023.

National team	Year	Apps	Goals
Kazakhstan	2012	5	0
Kazakhstan	2014	6	2
Kazakhstan	2015	8	0
Kazakhstan	2016	6	0
Kazakhstan	2017	4	0
Kazakhstan	2018	7	0
Kazakhstan	2019	8	1
Kazakhstan	2020	2	0
Kazakhstan	2022	2	0
Total		48	3

#	Date	Venue	Opponent	Score	Result	Competition
1	12 August 2014	Central Stadium, Almaty, Kazakhstan	Tajikistan	1–0	2–1	Friendly
2	5 September 2014	Astana Arena, Astana, Kazakhstan	Kyrgyzstan	4–0	7–1	Friendly
3	11 June 2019	Astana Arena, Nur-Sultan, Kazakhstan	San Marino	4–0	4–0	UEFA Euro 2020 qualification
4	7 June 2024	Vazgen Sargsyan Republican Stadium, Yerevan, Armenia	Armenia	1–0	1–2	Friendly

== Honours ==
Kairat

- Kazakhstan Cup: 2014, 2015

Individual

- Kazakh Footballer of the Year: 2014
