= Eduard Bakayev =

Russian footballer

Personal information
- Full name: Eduard Khazbiyevich Bakayev
- Date of birth: 10 September 1978 (age 48)
- Place of birth: Tskhinvali, Georgian SSR
- Height: 1.79 m (5 ft 10 1/2 in)
- Position: Forward

Senior career*
Years	Team	Apps	(Gls)
1995	FC Mozdok	23	(5)
1996–1997	FC Alania Vladikavkaz	3	(0)
1997	→ FC Alania-d Vladikavkaz (loan)	32	(11)
1998	FC Avtodor Vladikavkaz	20	(1)
1999	FC Chernomorets Novorossiysk	11	(0)
- * Club domestic league appearances and goals

Eduard Khazbiyevich Bakayev (Russian: Эдуард Хазбиевич Бакаев; born 10 September 1978) is a former Russian football player.

His younger brother Mikhail Bakayev is also a professional footballer.
