= Dmitri Khomich =

Russian footballer

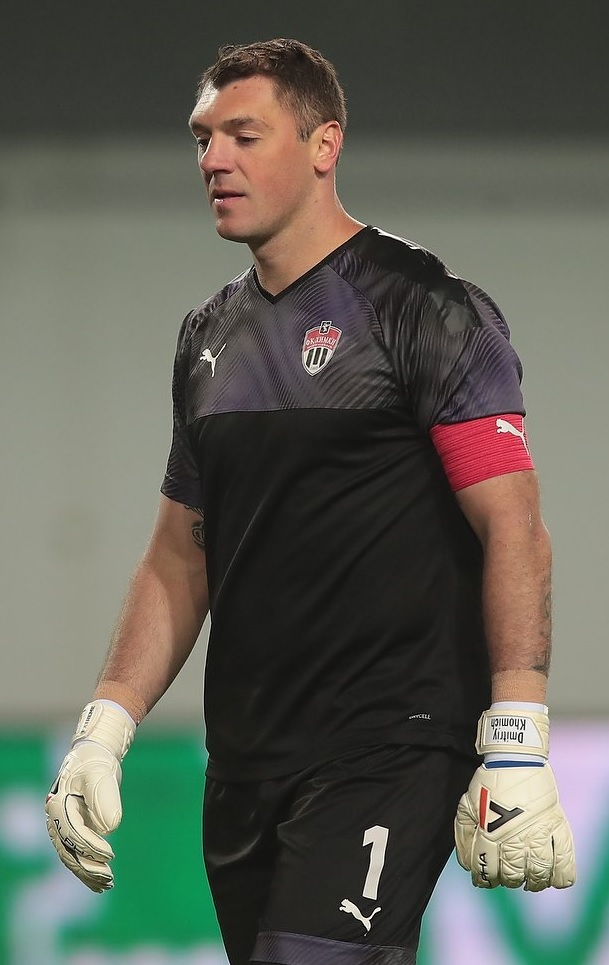
- Khomich with Khimki in 2020

Personal information
- Full name: Dmitri Nikolayevich Khomich
- Date of birth: 4 October 1984 (age 42)
- Place of birth: Vladikavkaz, USSR
- Height: 1.90 m (6 ft 3 in)
- Position: Goalkeeper

Team information
- Current team: Khimki-M (GK coach)

Senior career*
Years	Team	Apps	(Gls)
2000	Mozdok	8	(0)
2001–2004	Alania Vladikavkaz	23	(0)
2005–2010	Spartak Moscow	4	(0)
2008–2009	→ Spartak Nalchik (loan)	38	(0)
2010–2013	Alania Vladikavkaz	90	(0)
2014	Kairat	26	(0)
2015–2018	Amkar Perm	15	(0)
2018–2021	Khimki	23	(0)
2018	→ Khimki-M	5	(0)
2021	SKA-Khabarovsk	2	(0)

International career
2004–2007	Russia U-21	9	(0)

Managerial career
- 2022–2023: Khimki-M (GK coach)
- 2024–: Khimki-M (GK coach)
- * Club domestic league appearances and goals

Dmitri Nikolayevich Khomich (Russian: Дмитрий Николаевич Хомич, born 4 October 1984) is a Russian football coach and a former goalkeeper. He is a goalkeeping coach with Khimki-M.

== Career ==
He made his Russian Premier League debut for FC Alania Vladikavkaz on 16 August 2003 in a game against PFC Krylia Sovetov Samara, at the age of 18.

In February 2014, Khomich signed for a three-year contract with FC Kairat of the Kazakhstan Premier League. In October 2014, Khomich, along with Mikhail Bakayev, Zaurbek Pliyev, Aleksandr Kislitsyn and Samat Smakov, was banned from training with FC Kairat by the club. Khomich left FC Kairat in November 2014, following the conclusion of the 2014 season.

In February 2015, Khomich signed a contract with Amkar Perm till the end of the 2014–15 season.

== Career statistics ==
=== Club ===
As of 20 May 2018

Club	Season	League			Cup		Continental		Total	
Club	Season	Division	Apps	Goals	Apps	Goals	Apps	Goals	Apps	Goals
Mozdok	2000	PFL	8	0	0	0	–		8	0
Alania Vladikavkaz	2001	Russian Premier League	0	0	0	0	–		0	0
Alania Vladikavkaz	2002	Russian Premier League	0	0	0	0	–		0	0
Alania Vladikavkaz	2003	Russian Premier League	9	0	1	0	–		10	0
Alania Vladikavkaz	2004	Russian Premier League	14	0	1	0	–		15	0
Spartak Moscow	2005	Russian Premier League	0	0	1	0	–		1	0
Spartak Moscow	2006	Russian Premier League	3	0	1	0	0	0	4	0
Spartak Moscow	2007	Russian Premier League	1	0	2	0	3	0	6	0
Spartak Moscow	Total		4	0	4	0	3	0	11	0
Spartak Nalchik	2008	Russian Premier League	27	0	0	0	–		27	0
Spartak Nalchik	2009	Russian Premier League	11	0	0	0	–		11	0
Spartak Nalchik	Total		38	0	0	0	0	0	38	0
Alania Vladikavkaz	2010	Russian Premier League	16	0	2	0	–		18	0
Alania Vladikavkaz	2011–12	FNL	40	0	2	0	4	0	46	0
Alania Vladikavkaz	2012–13	Russian Premier League	17	0	0	0	–		17	0
Alania Vladikavkaz	2013–14	FNL	17	0	0	0	–		17	0
Alania Vladikavkaz	Total (2 spells)		113	0	6	0	4	0	123	0
Kairat	2014	Kazakhstan Premier League	26	0	3	0	4	0	33	0
Amkar Perm	2014–15	Russian Premier League	1	0	–		–		1	0
Amkar Perm	2015–16	Russian Premier League	0	0	1	0	–		1	0
Amkar Perm	2016–17	Russian Premier League	13	0	1	0	–		14	0
Amkar Perm	2017–18	Russian Premier League	1	0	1	0	–		2	0
Amkar Perm	Total		15	0	3	0	0	0	18	0
Career total			204	0	16	0	11	0	231	0
