= Ľubomír Michalík =

Slovak footballer

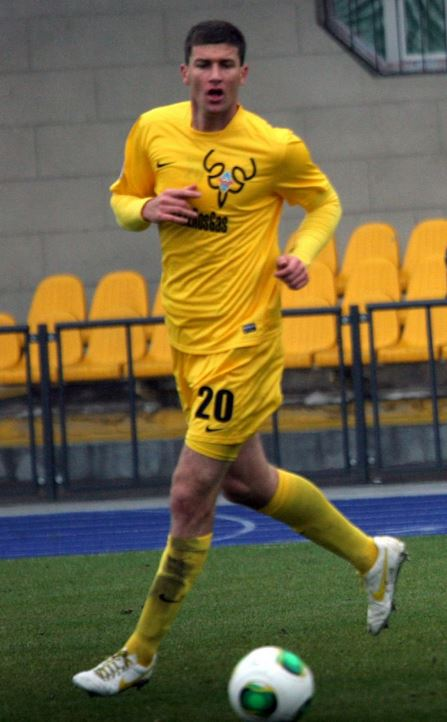
- Michalík playing for Kairat in 2013

Personal information
- Full name: Ľubomír Michalík
- Date of birth: 13 August 1983 (age 43)
- Place of birth: Čadca, Czechoslovakia
- Height: 2.00 m (6 ft 7 in)
- Position: Centre back

Team information
- Current team: OFK Matúškovo

Youth career
- –2000: Čadca

Senior career*
Years	Team	Apps	(Gls)
2000–2003	Čadca	?	(?)
2004	Žiar nad Hronom	?	(?)
2005–2006	Senec	20	(2)
2007–2008	Bolton Wanderers	11	(1)
2007	→ Leeds United (loan)	7	(1)
2008–2011	Leeds United	49	(1)
2010–2011	→ Carlisle United (loan)	13	(1)
2011–2012	Carlisle United	55	(2)
2012–2013	Portsmouth	18	(1)
2013–2014	Kairat Almaty	43	(0)
2015–2017	DAC Dunajská Streda	61	(2)
2017–2019	Sereď	62	(3)
2019	Slovan Galanta	13	(1)
2020–2021	Sereď	38	(0)
2022	Slovan Galanta	17	(1)
2022–2023	Nové Zámky	15	(0)
2024–	OFK Matúškovo	15	(0)

International career
2006–2015	Slovakia	8	(2)
- * Club domestic league appearances and goals as of 15:29, 6 January 2024 (UTC)

Ľubomír Michalík (born 13 August 1983) is a former Slovak professional footballer who plays as a centre-back for a semi-professional side OFK Matúškovo.

== Club career ==
=== Early career ===
Michalík was born in Čadca. He played for Čadca's youth teams before making his first team debut aged 17. He later had a spell at Žiar nad Hronom before joining Slovak Superliga club Senec in 2006.

=== Bolton Wanderers ===
He signed for Bolton Wanderers in January 2007 on a three-and-a-half-year contract for an undisclosed transfer fee. On 28 April 2007, Michalík scored his first and only goal for Bolton, in a 2–2 away draw against Chelsea at Stamford Bridge.

=== Leeds United ===
In March 2007, Michalík made a loan switch to Leeds United on a one-month loan deal. The defender's performances earned a great deal of credit from the Leeds faithful, particularly due to his match-winning goal on 7 April in a 2–1 victory over Plymouth Argyle. As a result of his strong performances, then Leeds manager Dennis Wise extended the Slovakian's loan deal until the end of the season, although Bolton recalled Michalik back due to a spate of injuries to their first choice centre-backs. Michalik played the rest of the season with Bolton and even managed to score against Chelsea at Stamford Bridge. During his spell back at Bolton, Leeds were relegated to League 1.

Wise continued to reiterate his liking for the player, and attempted to re-sign the defender in the January 2008 transfer window. A deal was reported to be closed, believed to be involving a £500,000 fee, when Wise left the manager's post to head for Newcastle United. However, upon the appointment of Gary McAllister as Leeds boss, the Yorkshire side remained insistent on their determination to sign the Slovak. On the final day of the transfer window, a deal was concluded and Michalik signed a three-and-a-half-year deal. Bolton seemed willing to sell having recruited Gary Cahill as a replacement. Michalik made 13 first-team appearances in the 2007–08 season.

Michalík managed to establish himself as one of Leeds' first-choice defenders, often partnering Paul Huntington. On 6 September 2008, Michalik was sent off in a match for Leeds against Crewe Alexandra for his second bookable offence. Leeds went on and won the match 5–2. During the middle of the 2008–09 season after a number of inconsistent performances Michalik was dropped from the Leeds team by new manager Simon Grayson in favour of new loan signing Richard Naylor. Michalik never regained a starting place and found himself on the bench for the remainder of the season. A role which has continued into the 2009–10 season.

Michalik scored his second goal for Leeds which was his first since signing a permanent deal against Stockport County on 5 September 2009. He started the 2009–10 season mainly as a substitute, but had been required to come off the bench on several occasions and play a vital role for Leeds. It has been said his form has greatly improved under manager Simon Grayson. Michalik had a goal wrongly ruled out for offside in the League Cup tie against Liverpool. Replays showed that Jermaine Beckford and Luciano Becchio were onside. Michalik started the game for Leeds against Brighton & Hove Albion, and with Richard Naylor still injured Michalik once again partnered Patrick Kisnorbo at centre back against Leyton Orient and kept consecutive clean sheets. Michalik started the game against Kettering Town and was judged to be at fault for the goal conceded with Casper Ankergren also sharing the blame. Despite the error Michalik started his 4th game in a row in the league game against Oldham Athletic. Michalik kept his place in the Leeds team for the game against Huddersfield Town and the FA Cup replay against Kettering Town. Michalik is one of the free-kick takers for Leeds United and is known to strike a ball at over 100 MPH, although he is yet to score one of these. With injuries to fellow centre back's Patrick Kisnorbo and Richard Naylor at various points, Michalik has been able to get a regular run of games for Leeds.

Michalik came on as a late substitute in Leeds 1–0 win against Manchester United at Old Trafford in the FA Cup 3rd round. Michalik came on as a half time substitute in Leeds' defeat to Swindon Town, he returned to Leeds' starting line-up against Colchester United and with Patrick Kisnorbo still out injured Michalik retained his place in the side for the matches against Tottenham Hotspur in the FA Cup replay, and also the league game against Hartlepool. With Kisnorbo still out injured Michalik retained his place in Leeds' JPT second leg game against Carlisle United but he was at fault for one of the goals conceded after a horrendous miskick gave the ball straight to Kevan Hurst who slotted the ball home, Leeds lost the tie 6–5 on penalties. The following game Michalik dropped to the bench against Leyton Orient. Michalik made scarce appearances from then until the end of the season, after a spell out the squad he returned to the bench against Bristol Rovers a game which Leeds won 2–1 and saw them promoted to the Championship as runners up. Following promotion United manager, Simon Grayson, transfer listed Michalik.

On 14 May 2010, after receiving a call up to Slovakia's provisional World Cup squad, Michalik was instructed by Leeds to find a new club and placed on the transfer list. He did not play a single game for Leeds' first team during the 2010–11 pre-season friendlies.

=== Carlisle United ===
On 31 August 2010, Michalik joined League One club Carlisle United on loan until 3 January 2011. Michalik made his debut in the 0–0 draw against Swindon Town after coming into Carlisle's starting 11 as a replacement for the recently departed Ian Harte. Michalik's second game for Carlisle came against League leaders Sheffield Wednesday with Carlisle picking up a clean sheet and earning a 1–0 away win. Michalik helped Carlisle keep a 3rd successive clean sheet in his third game for the club against Brighton.

Michalik scored his first goal for Carlisle against Hartlepool with a 40-yard freekick. After picking up a hamstring injury Michalik returned to Leeds to have his injury assessed. However, returned to Carlisle after only spending a few days having treatment at his parent club. After missing games with a hamstring injury, Michalik returned to the starting line-up against Bristol Rovers. Leeds refused permission for Michalik to play for Carlisle in the FA Cup against Tipton Town. Michalik was sent off in Carlisle's fixture against Rochdale for two bookable offences.

Michalik scored his second goal for Carlisle against Sheffield Wednesday in the Football League Trophy to help Carlisle reach the Northern Area final. In December 2010. Michalik revealed he was interested in extending his loan deal until the end of the season.

In January 2011, Michalik had the remaining six-months of his contract terminated by Leeds to allow him to find a new club. On 14 January, Michalik re-signed for Carlisle on a permanent deal. He is believed to be a transfer target of Hibernian and left Carlisle United in June after rejecting a new contract. Eventually, Michalik rejected a chance to move to Hibernian with the agreement couldn't be reached.

=== Portsmouth ===
On 14 September 2012, Michalik signed for League One side Portsmouth on a one-month deal. Michalik scored on his Portsmouth debut in a 2–1 loss at Fratton Park against Swindon Town. In a televised match on Sky Sports against Sheffield United on 30 October 2012, Michalik made a mistake when he tackled Chris Porter in the penalty box, resulting a penalty to an opposition team and was converted by Nick Blackman, to make it 1–0 and the score stayed the same until full-time. After the match, Manager Michael Appleton says Michalik learned his lesson over his action. Despite this, Michalik continued to be in the regular first team and was released alongside four players on 15 January 2013, having decided not to renewed his contract.

=== Kairat Almaty ===
Shortly being released by Portsmouth, Michalik joined Kazakhstan side FC Kairat, where he will be joined by former national manager Vladimír Weiss. Michalík was released by Kairat following the completion of the 2014 season, having won the 2014 Kazakhstan Cup with the club.

=== Later career ===
In January 2015, Michalík signed for Slovak First Football League club DAC Dunajská Streda on a two-and-a-half-year contract. He departed Dunajská Streda in summer 2017 at the end of his contract.

Michalík signed for 2. Liga club Sereď on a one-year deal in July 2017. Sereď were promoted to the Slovak First Football League in his first season with the club. In August 2019, it was announced that he had left Sereď.

He had a spell at Slovan Galanta before he re-signed for Sereď in January 2020. In December 2020, he extended his contract until the end of the 2020–21 season. He left Sereď and returned to Slovan Galanta in February 2022.

In January 2024, he joined Slovak seventh-tier club OFK Matúškovo.

=== Managerial career ===
In October 2024, Michalík began cooperation with ViOn Zlaté Moravce as a chief scout and opponent analyst. In 2025 and 2026, he repeatedly scouted players in The Gambia, in cooperation with former team-mate Momodou Ceesay.

== International career ==
Michalík's international debut came on 10 December 2006 in the second half of the Slovakia versus United Arab Emirates friendly game. His first international goal came in the same game. He played his second match against Republic of Ireland on 28 March 2007.

On 1 October 2009, Michalík received an international recall for the World Cup qualifiers against Slovenia and Poland. Michalik was an unused substitute in the World Cup Qualifier against Poland.

On 11 May 2010, Michalík was named in Slovakia's 29-man provisional squad for the 2010 FIFA World Cup in South Africa. He was, however, left out of the final 23-man Slovakia World Cup Squad when it was announced on 3 June.

On 11 October 2011, Michalík became the first Carlisle United player to play in a competitive international match since Eric Welsh who represented Northern Ireland team in 1967 (although teammate Peter Murphy did play in a friendly match for the Republic of Ireland in 2007). Michalík then played the full 90 minutes in a 1–1 draw with Macedonia in a Euro 2012 qualifier, Michalík was denied an 89th-minute winner by a Martin Bogatinov save.

== Personal life ==
His first son, Adamko, was born in 2014.

== Career statistics ==
=== Club ===
Appearances and goals by club, season and competition
Club	Season	League			National cup		League cup		Other^{[a]}		Total	
Club	Season	Division	Apps	Goals	Apps	Goals	Apps	Goals	Apps	Goals	Apps	Goals
FC Senec	2006–07	Slovak Superliga	20	2	—		—		—		20	2
Bolton Wanderers	2006–07	Premier League	4	1	—		—		—		4	1
Bolton Wanderers	2007–08	Premier League	7	0	1	0	2	0	3	0	13	0
Bolton Wanderers	Total		11	1	1	0	2	0	3	0	17	1
Leeds United (loan)	2006–07	Championship	7	1	—		—		—		7	1
Leeds United	2007–08	League One	20	0	—		—		—		20	0
Leeds United	2008–09	League One	19	0	3	0	3	0	1	0	26	0
Leeds United	2009–10	League One	13	1	4	0	2	0	4	0	23	1
Leeds United	Total		52	1	7	0	5	0	5	0	69	1
Carlisle United (loan)	2010–11	League One	32	2	—		—		5	2	37	4
Carlisle United	2011–12	League One	36	0	2	0	—		—		38	0
Portsmouth	2012–13	League One	18	1	1	0	—		1	0	20	1
Kairat	2013	Kazakhstan Premier League	26	1	2	0	—		—		28	1
Kairat	2014	Kazakhstan Premier League	17	0	3	0	—		4	0	24	0
Kairat	Total		43	1	5	0	0	0	4	0	52	1
DAC Dunajská Streda	2014–15	Slovak First Football League	13	1	3	0	—		—		16	1
DAC Dunajská Streda	2015–16	Slovak First Football League	25	0	3	0	—		—		28	0
DAC Dunajská Streda	2016–17	Slovak First Football League	23	1	3	0	—		—		26	1
DAC Dunajská Streda	Total		61	2	9	0	0	0	0	0	70	2
Sereď	2017–18	Slovak 2. Liga	29	3	1	0	—		—		30	3
Sereď	2018–19	Slovak First Football League	28	0	2	0	—		—		30	0
Sereď	2019–20	Slovak First Football League	5	0	0	0	—		—		5	0
Sereď	Total		62	3	3	0	0	0	0	0	65	3
Slovan Galanta	2019–20	Slovak 3. Liga Západ	13	1			—		—		13	1
Sereď	2019–20	Slovak First Football League	7	0	1	0	—		—		8	0
Sereď	2020–21	Slovak First Football League	27	0	1	0	—		—		28	0
Sereď	2021–22	Slovak First Football League	4	0	0	0	—		—		4	0
Sereď	Total		38	0	2	0	0	0	0	0	40	0
Nové Zámky	2022–23	Slovak 3. Liga Západ	18	0			—		—		18	0
Career total			411	15	30	0	7	0	18	2	466	17

a. Includes other competitive competitions, including the Football League Trophy, UEFA Cup and Europa League.

=== International goals ===
Appearances and goals by national team and year
National team	Year	Apps	Goals
Slovakia	2006	1	1
Slovakia	2007	3	1
Slovakia	2011	2	0
Slovakia	2012	1	0
Slovakia	2015	1	0
Total		8	2

Slovakia score listed first, score column indicates score after each Michalík goal

List of international goals scored by Ľubomír Michalík
No.	Date	Venue	Cap	Opponent	Score	Result	Competition	Ref.
1	10 December 2006	Sheikh Zayed Stadium, Abu Dhabi, UAE	1	United Arab Emirates	2–0	2–1	Friendly match	
2	21 November 2007	Stadio Olimpico, Serravalle, San Marino	4	San Marino	1–0	5–0	UEFA Euro 2008 qualifying	

== Honours ==
Leeds United

- Football League One runner-up: 2009–10

Carlisle United

- Football League Trophy: 2010–11

FC Kairat

- Kazakhstan Cup: 2014

ŠKF Sereď

- 2. Liga: 2017–18
