= Zaurbek Pliyev =

Russian-Ossetian footballer

Zaurbek Pliyev Заурбек Плиев
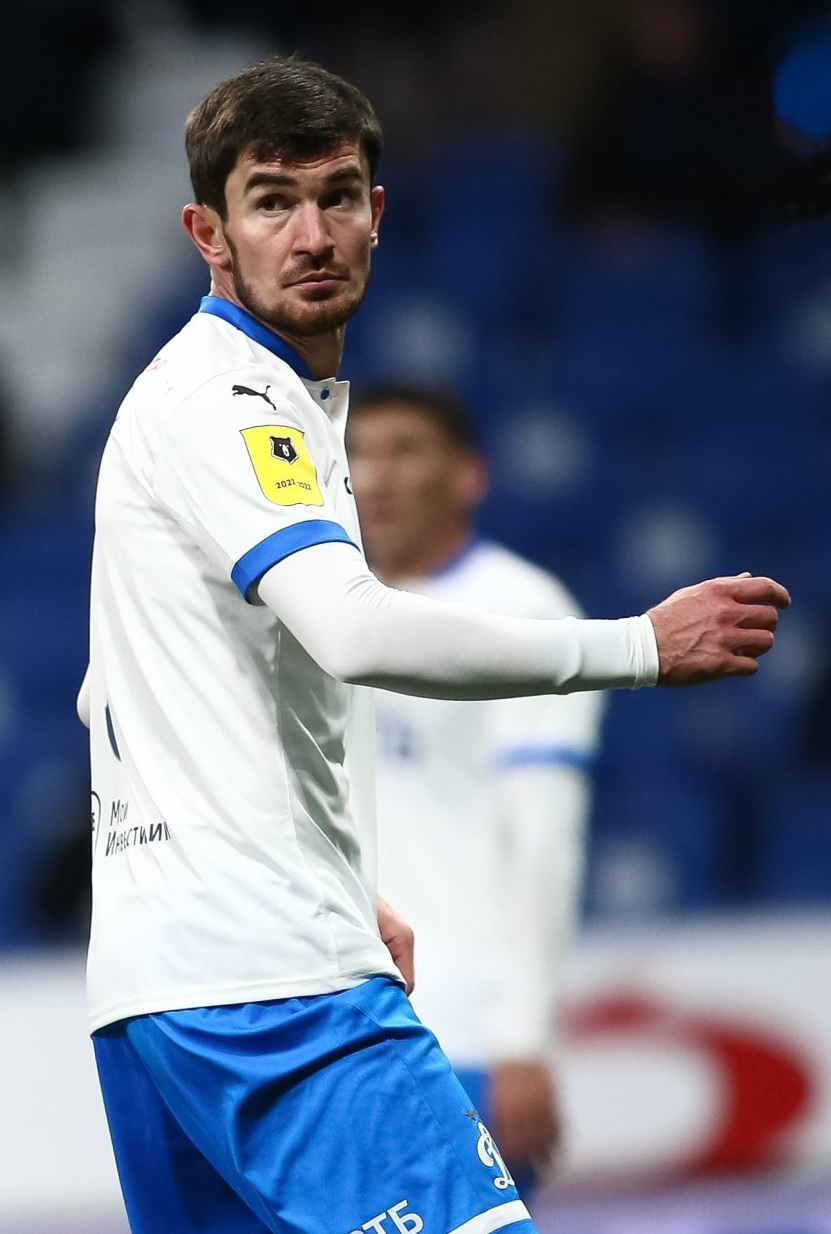
- Pliyev with Dynamo Moscow in 2021

Personal information
- Full name: Zaurbek Igorevich Pliyev
- Date of birth: 27 September 1991 (age 35)
- Place of birth: Vladikavkaz, Russian SFSR
- Height: 1.88 m (6 ft 2 in)
- Positions: Centre-back; left-back

Youth career
- –2008: Dynamo Moscow

Senior career*
Years	Team	Apps	(Gls)
2009–2010	Spartak Nalchik	4	(0)
2011	Lokomotiv Astana	21	(1)
2011–2013	Alania Vladikavkaz	59	(1)
2014–2015	Kairat	46	(4)
2016–2019	Akhmat Grozny	50	(0)
2019–2022	Dynamo Moscow	23	(0)
2022	Ufa	9	(0)
2023	Rodina Moscow	21	(1)
2024	Sokol Saratov	12	(0)
2024–2025	Rotor Volgograd	26	(0)
2025–2026	Chernomorets Novorossiysk	29	(2)

International career^{‡}
2009	Russia U-19	6	(1)
2012	Russia U-21	1	(0)
- * Club domestic league appearances and goals as of 16 May 2026 ‡ National team caps and goals as of 10 September 2012

Zaurbek Igorevich Pliyev (Russian: Заурбек Игоревич Плиев, Iron Ossetic: Плиты Игоры фырт Зауырбег; born 27 September 1991) is a Russian-Ossetian former football player.

== Career ==
=== Club ===
Pliyev made his professional debut for Spartak Nalchik on 15 July 2009 in the Russian Cup game against FC Nizhny Novgorod.

In October 2014, Pliyev, along with Dmitri Khomich, Mikhail Bakayev, Aleksandr Kislitsyn and Samat Smakov, was banned from training with FC Kairat by the club.

On 7 December 2015, Pliyev signed a three-and-a-half-year contract with FC Terek Grozny. After signing a new contract with Akhmat at the end of the 2018–19 season, Pliyev joined Dynamo Moscow on 9 June 2019, signing a three-year contract.

=== International ===
After representing Russia's U-19 team in 2009, he was called up to the Kazakhstan U-21 squad in 2011. In August 2012, he was called up to the Russia U-21 squad.

== Career statistics ==
As of 16 May 2026

Club	Season	League			Cup		Continental		Other		Total	
Club	Season	Division	Apps	Goals	Apps	Goals	Apps	Goals	Apps	Goals	Apps	Goals
Spartak Nalchik	2009	Russian Premier League	0	0	1	0	—		—		1	0
Spartak Nalchik	2010	Russian Premier League	4	0	1	0	—		—		5	0
Spartak Nalchik	Total		4	0	2	0	0	0	0	0	6	0
Lokomotiv Astana	2011	Kazakhstan Premier League	21	1	1	0	—		0	0	22	1
Alania Vladikavkaz	2011–12	Russian First League	24	1	—		2 (Note: Appearances in the UEFA Europa League)	0	—		26	1
Alania Vladikavkaz	2012–13	Russian Premier League	20	0	0	0	—		—		20	0
Alania Vladikavkaz	2013–14	Russian First League	15	0	1	0	—		—		16	0
Alania Vladikavkaz	Total		59	1	1	0	2	0	0	0	62	1
Kairat	2014	Kazakhstan Premier League	24	3	3	0	4	0	—		31	3
Kairat	2025	Kazakhstan Premier League	22	1	3	0	0	0	1 (Note: Appearance in Kazakhstan Super Cup)	0	26	1
Kairat	Total		46	4	6	0	4	0	1	0	57	4
Akhmat Grozny	2015–16	Russian Premier League	9	0	1	0	—		—		10	0
Akhmat Grozny	2016–17	Russian Premier League	10	0	2	0	—		—		12	0
Akhmat Grozny	2017–18	Russian Premier League	12	0	0	0	—		—		12	0
Akhmat Grozny	2018–19	Russian Premier League	19	0	1	0	—		—		20	0
Akhmat Grozny	Total		50	0	4	0	0	0	0	0	54	0
Dynamo Moscow	2019–20	Russian Premier League	14	0	0	0	—		—		14	0
Dynamo Moscow	2020–21	Russian Premier League	7	0	0	0	0	0	—		7	0
Dynamo Moscow	2021–22	Russian Premier League	2	0	1	0	—		—		3	0
Dynamo Moscow	Total		23	0	1	0	0	0	0	0	24	0
Ufa	2022–23	Russian First League	9	0	2	0	—		—		11	0
Rodina Moscow	2022–23	Russian First League	13	1	—		—		2 (Note: Appearances in promotion play-offs)	0	15	1
Rodina Moscow	2023–24	Russian First League	8	0	1	0	—		—		9	0
Rodina Moscow	Total		21	1	1	0	0	0	2	0	24	1
Sokol Saratov	2023–24	Russian First League	12	0	—		—		—		12	0
Rotor Volgograd	2024–25	Russian First League	26	0	0	0	—		—		26	0
Chernomorets	2025–26	Russian First League	29	2	0	0	—		—		29	2
Career total			300	9	18	0	6	0	3	0	327	9

== Personal life ==
His younger brother Konstantin Pliyev is also a football player.
