= Aleksandr Kislitsyn =

Kazakhstani footballer

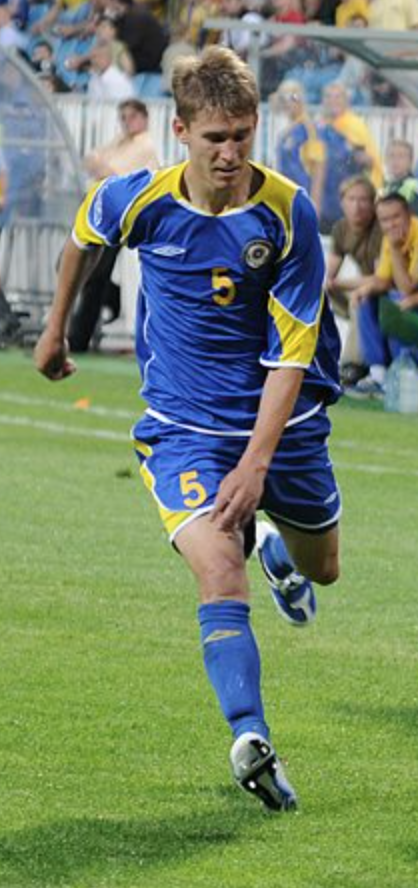

Personal information
- Date of birth: 8 March 1986 (age 40)
- Place of birth: Karaganda, Soviet Union
- Height: 1.82 m (5 ft 11 1/2 in)
- Position: Centre back

Senior career*
Years	Team	Apps	(Gls)
2006–2010	Shakhter Karagandy	101	(2)
2011–2012	Tobol	55	(4)
2013–2014	Kairat	59	(5)
2015–2016	Irtysh Pavlodar	28	(1)
2016	Okzhetpes	9	(1)
2017–2018	Irtysh Pavlodar	58	(2)
2019	Okzhetpes	31	(1)
2020	Shakhter Karagandy	1	(0)
2021	Zhetysu	9	(1)

International career
2008–	Kazakhstan	25	(0)
- * Club domestic league appearances and goals as of 9 May 2021

Aleksandr Kislitsyn (Russian: Александр Кислицын; born 8 March 1986) is a Kazakhstani football defender.

== Career ==
Born in Karaganda, Kislitsyn began playing football with the reserve team of local side FC Shakhter in 2004. He joined Shakhter's first team in 2006 at age 20, and would appear in more than 100 league matches during four seasons with Shakhter. In February 2011, Kislitsyn signed with FC Tobol.

In October 2014, Kislitsyn, along with Dmitri Khomich, Mikhail Bakayev, Zaurbek Pliyev and Samat Smakov, was banned from training with FC Kairat by the club. On 6 January 2015, Kislitsyn, along with Samat Smakov, moved to FC Irtysh Pavlodar.

On 30 September 2016, Kislitsyn had his contract with FC Okzhetpes terminated by mutual consent.

On 20 January 2019, Kislitsyn signed for Okzhetpes, before singing for Shakhter Karagandy on 8 February 2020.

=== International ===
Kislitsyn was called up for the Kazakhstan national football team for the first time in June 2008. He has made 14 appearances for the senior side since 2008.
