= Samat Smakov =

Kazakhstani footballer

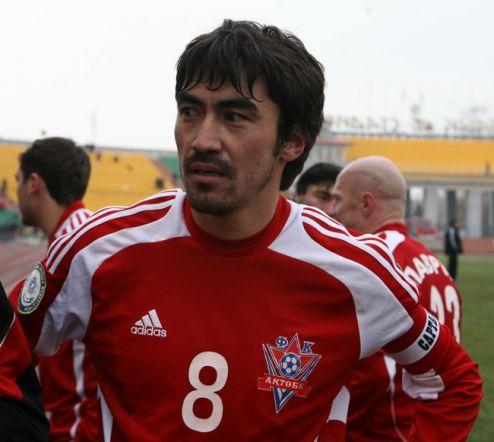
- Smakov with Aktobe in 2010

Personal information
- Full name: Samat Kabiruly Smakov
- Date of birth: 8 December 1978 (age 47)
- Place of birth: Semey, Kazakh SSR, Soviet Union
- Height: 1.77 m (5 ft 9 1/2 in)
- Positions: Centre back; right back

Team information
- Current team: Zhetysu (manager)

Youth career
- 1992–1997: Yelimay

Senior career*
Years	Team	Apps	(Gls)
1997–1998	Yelimay	33	(6)
1999–2000	Irtysh-Bastau	20	(1)
2000–2001	Rostov	39	(0)
2000–2001	Rostov reserves	8	(1)
2002	Zhenis Astana	11	(2)
2003	Yelimay	27	(4)
2004–2006	Kairat	91	(15)
2007–2013	Aktobe	171	(30)
2013	Çaykur Rizespor	16	(0)
2013–2014	Kairat	32	(0)
2015	Irtysh Pavlodar	26	(3)
2016	Aktobe	12	(5)
2016–2017	Ordabasy	30	(1)
Total		516	(68)

International career
2000–2016	Kazakhstan	76	(2)

Managerial career
- 2018–2019: Aktobe (sporting director)
- 2021–2022: Ordabasy (assistant)
- 2022: Zhenis (caretaker)
- 2022–2023: Elimai
- 2023: Elimai (assistant)
- 2023–2024: Astana (technical director)
- 2024–: Zhetysu
- * Club domestic league appearances and goals

Samat Qabırūly Smaqov (Kazakh: Самат Қабірұлы Смақов; (Note: Often transliterated through the Russified Romanization Samat Kabiruly Smakov, Russian: Самат Кабирулы Смаков) born 8 December 1978) is a Kazakhstani football manager and a former player who played as a defender. He is the manager of Zhetysu.

== Club career ==
Smakov started his career in his home town Semey playing for FC Elimay, and has since played for different teams, including FC Rostov in Russian Premier League. He is a four-time champion of Kazakhstan with four clubs. Having strong leadership qualities, he has captained most of his teams. He held FC Aktobe's club record for most Premier League appearances, before being surpassed by Yuri Logvinenko, in August 2013.

In October 2014, Smakov, along with Dmitri Khomich, Mikhail Bakayev, Zaurbek Pliyev and Aleksandr Kislitsyn, was banned from training with FC Kairat by the club. On 6 January 2015, Smakov, along with Aleksandr Kislitsyn, moved to FC Irtysh Pavlodar.

On 4 August 2016, Smakov signed for FC Ordabasy until the end of the 2016 season.

== International career ==
Samat received his first cap for Kazakhstan on 31 March 2000 in an Asian Cup qualifier against Jordan at the age of 18. Since that time Smakov was capped in all major matches of Kazakhstan, including World Cup 2002, World Cup 2006 and Euro 2008 qualifiers. He played 76 international matches and scored two goals, his first goal a penalty against Belgium in September 2007. Many times he led the team as a captain. He held a record as the most capped player of the Kazakhstan national football team with 76 matches from June 2016 to October 2026, when his record was beaten by Serhiy Malyi.

== Post-playing career ==
On 7 January 2018, Ordabasy announced that Smakov had joined his former club Aktobe as their new General Director.

== Career statistics ==
=== International ===
Kazakhstan
Year	Apps	Goals
2000	5	0
2001	6	0
2002	0	0
2003	1	0
2004	8	0
2005	8	0
2006	7	0
2007	12	1
2008	8	0
2009	1	0
2010	0	0
2011	3	0
2012	0	0
2013	0	0
2014	3	1
2015	9	0
2016	5	0
Total	76	2

Statistics accurate as of match played 11 October 2016

Scores and results list Kazakhstan's goal tally first.

#	Date	Venue	Opponent	Score	Result	Competition	Ref
1.	12 September 2007	Almaty Central Stadium, Almaty	Belgium	2–2	2–2	Euro 2008 qualifier	
2.	16 November 2014	Türk Telekom Arena, Istanbul	Turkey	1–3	1–3	Euro 2016 qualifier	

== Honours ==
Yelimay

- Kazakhstan Premier League: 1998

Irtysh-Bastau

- Kazakhstan Premier League: 1999

Zhenis Astana

- Kazakhstan Cup: 2002

Kairat

- Kazakhstan Premier League: 2004

Aktobe

- Kazakhstan Premier League: 2007, 2008, 2009
- Kazakhstan Cup: 2010
- Kazakhstan Super Cup: 2008, 2010

Individual

- Kazakhstani Footballer of the Year: 2004, 2008
- GOAL Journal Player of the Year: 2004, 2007, 2008, 2009, 2010
