= Mikhail Bakayev =

Russian professional footballer

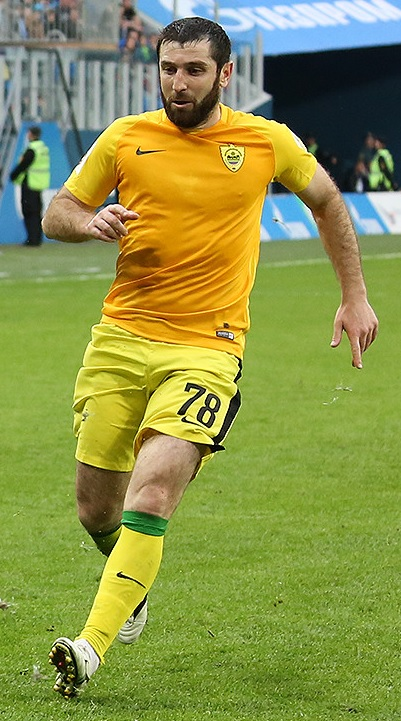
- Bakayev with Anzhi Makhachkala in 2018

Personal information
- Full name: Mikhail Khazbiyevich Bakayev
- Date of birth: 5 August 1987 (age 39)
- Place of birth: Tskhinvali, Georgian SSR
- Height: 1.78 m (5 ft 10 in)
- Position: Midfielder

Youth career
- Yunost Vladikavkaz

Senior career*
| Years | Team | Apps | (Gls) |
| 2003–2005 | Avtodor Vladikavkaz | 47 | (2) |
| 2006–2008 | Alania Vladikavkaz | 91 | (2) |
| 2009–2011 | Anzhi Makhachkala | 69 | (3) |
| 2011–2013 | Alania Vladikavkaz | 66 | (3) |
| 2014–2017 | Kairat | 100 | (0) |
| 2017–2018 | Anzhi Makhachkala | 16 | (0) |
| 2018–2019 | Orenburg | 0 | (0) |
| 2019–2020 | Shinnik Yaroslavl | 12 | (0) |
| 2020–2021 | Shakhter Karagandy | 32 | (0) |
| 2022 | Aksu | 16 | (0) |
| 2023 | Alania Vladikavkaz | 2 | (0) |
| 2024 | Alania-2 Vladikavkaz | 0 | (0) |

International career
| 2008 | Russia U-21 | 2 | (0) |
- * Club domestic league appearances and goals

Mikhail Khazbiyevich Bakayev (Russian: Михаил Хазбиевич Бакаев; born 5 August 1987) is a Russian former professional footballer who played as a defensive midfielder.

== Career ==
=== Club ===
Bakayev made his professional debut in the Russian Second Division in 2003 for Avtodor Vladikavkaz.

He made his Russian Premier League debut for Anzhi Makhachkala on 13 March 2010 in a game against Spartak Nalchik.

On 1 August 2011, Bakayev re-signed for Alania Vladikavkaz after two and a half years with Anzhi Makhachkala.

In March 2014, Bakayev signed a three-year contract with Kairat of the Kazakhstan Premier League. In October 2014, Bakayev, along with Dmitri Khomich, Zaurbek Pliyev, Aleksandr Kislitsyn and Samat Smakov, was banned from training with Kairat by the club. On 28 October 2016, Bakayev extended his contract with Kairat until 16 December 2019. On 29 August 2017, Kairat announced that Bakayev had left the club to join Anzhi Makhachkala, with Anzhi announcing the signing the following day.

On 2 July 2018, Orenburg announced the signing of Bakayev.

On 14 February 2020, Bakayev left Shinnik Yaroslavl by mutual consent.

On 26 February 2020, Shakhter Karagandy announced the signing of Bakayev. On 30 December 2021, Bakayev left Shakhter Karagandy after his contract expired.

=== International ===
In August 2008, Bakayev was called up to the Russia U21 squad.

== Personal life ==
His older brother Eduard Bakayev was also a professional footballer.

== Career statistics ==
As of match played 31 May 2024

| Club | Season | League | | | Cup | | Continental | | Other | | Total | |
| Club | Season | Division | Apps | Goals | Apps | Goals | Apps | Goals | Apps | Goals | Apps | Goals |
|---|---|---|---|---|---|---|---|---|---|---|---|---|
| Avtodor Vladikavkaz | 2003 | Russian Second League | 15 | 1 | 0 | 0 | – | | – | | 15 | 1 |
| Avtodor Vladikavkaz | 2004 | Russian Second League | 9 | 0 | 0 | 0 | – | | – | | 9 | 0 |
| Avtodor Vladikavkaz | 2005 | Russian Second League | 23 | 1 | 1 | 0 | – | | – | | 24 | 1 |
| Avtodor Vladikavkaz | Total | | 47 | 2 | 1 | 0 | 0 | 0 | 0 | 0 | 48 | 2 |
| Alania Vladikavkaz | 2006 | Russian Second League | 24 | 0 | 3 | 0 | – | | – | | 27 | 0 |
| Alania Vladikavkaz | 2007 | Russian First League | 36 | 0 | 1 | 0 | – | | – | | 37 | 0 |
| Alania Vladikavkaz | 2008 | Russian First League | 31 | 2 | 2 | 0 | – | | – | | 33 | 2 |
| Alania Vladikavkaz | Total | | 91 | 2 | 6 | 0 | 0 | 0 | 0 | 0 | 97 | 2 |
| Anzhi Makhachkala | 2009 | Russian First League | 33 | 2 | 1 | 0 | – | | – | | 34 | 2 |
| Anzhi Makhachkala | 2010 | Russian Premier League | 29 | 1 | 0 | 0 | – | | – | | 29 | 1 |
| Anzhi Makhachkala | 2011–12 | Russian Premier League | 7 | 0 | 1 | 0 | – | | – | | 8 | 0 |
| Anzhi Makhachkala | Total | | 69 | 3 | 2 | 0 | 0 | 0 | 0 | 0 | 71 | 3 |
| Alania Vladikavkaz | 2011–12 | Russian First League | 29 | 3 | – | | 2 (Note: Appearances in the UEFA Europa League) | 0 | – | | 31 | 3 |
| Alania Vladikavkaz | 2012–13 | Russian Premier League | 21 | 0 | 1 | 0 | – | | – | | 22 | 0 |
| Alania Vladikavkaz | 2013–14 | Russian First League | 16 | 0 | 1 | 1 | – | | – | | 17 | 1 |
| Alania Vladikavkaz | Total | | 66 | 3 | 2 | 1 | 2 | 0 | 0 | 0 | 70 | 4 |
| Kairat | 2014 | Kazakhstan Premier League | 28 | 0 | 5 | 0 | 4 | 0 | – | | 37 | 0 |
| Kairat | 2015 | Kazakhstan Premier League | 26 | 0 | 5 | 0 | 4 | 1 | 1 (Note: Appearances in the Kazakhstan Super Cup) | 0 | 36 | 1 |
| Kairat | 2016 | Kazakhstan Premier League | 29 | 0 | 5 | 0 | 4 | 1 | 1 | 0 | 39 | 1 |
| Kairat | 2017 | Kazakhstan Premier League | 17 | 0 | 4 | 0 | 3 | 0 | 1 | 0 | 25 | 0 |
| Kairat | Total | | 100 | 0 | 19 | 0 | 15 | 2 | 3 | 0 | 137 | 2 |
| Anzhi Makhachkala | 2017–18 | Russian Premier League | 16 | 0 | 0 | 0 | – | | 1 (Note: Appearance in the relegation play-offs) | 0 | 17 | 0 |
| Orenburg | 2018–19 | Russian Premier League | 0 | 0 | 0 | 0 | – | | – | | 0 | 0 |
| Shinnik Yaroslavl | 2019–20 | Russian First League | 12 | 0 | 2 | 0 | – | | – | | 14 | 0 |
| Shakhter Karagandy | 2020 | Kazakhstan Premier League | 17 | 0 | – | | – | | – | | 17 | 0 |
| Shakhter Karagandy | 2021 | Kazakhstan Premier League | 15 | 0 | 3 | 0 | 2 (Note: Appearances in the UEFA Europa Conference League) | 0 | 0 | 0 | 20 | 0 |
| Shakhter Karagandy | Total | | 32 | 0 | 3 | 0 | 2 | 0 | 0 | 0 | 37 | 0 |
| Aksu | 2022 | Kazakhstan Premier League | 16 | 0 | 4 | 0 | – | | – | | 20 | 0 |
| Alania Vladikavkaz | 2022–23 | Russian First League | 2 | 0 | – | | – | | – | | 2 | 0 |
| Alania Vladikavkaz | 2023–24 | Russian First League | 0 | 0 | 0 | 0 | – | | – | | 0 | 0 |
| Alania Vladikavkaz | Total | | 2 | 0 | 0 | 0 | 0 | 0 | 0 | 0 | 2 | 0 |
| Alania-2 Vladikavkaz | 2024 | Russian Second League B | 0 | 0 | – | | – | | – | | 0 | 0 |
| Career total | | | 451 | 10 | 39 | 1 | 19 | 2 | 4 | 0 | 513 | 13 |

== Honours ==
=== Club ===
FC Kairat

- Kazakhstan Cup (2): 2014, 2015
- Kazakhstan Super Cup (1): 2016
