= 2013 FC Kairat season =

FC Kairat
2013 season
- Chairman: Kairat Boranbayev
- Manager: Vladimír Weiss
- Stadium: Central Stadium
- Kazakhstan Premier League: 3rd
- Kazakhstan Cup: Second round vs Shakhter Karagandy
- Top goalscorer: League: Momodou Ceesay (12); All: Momodou Ceesay (12)
Home colours	Away colours	Third colours

The 2013 FC Kairat season was the third successive season that the club played in the Kazakhstan Premier League, the highest tier of association football in Kazakhstan, since their promotion back to the top flight in 2009. Kairat finished the season in 3rd place and reached the Second round of the Kazakhstan Cup.

== Squad ==
As of match played 2 November 2013

No.	Name	Nationality	Position	Date of birth (age)	Signed from	Signed in	Apps.	Goals
Goalkeepers
16	Ildar Shaikheslamov	(Kazakhstan)	GK	27 July 1989 (aged 24)	Tsesna	2012	1	0
30	Daniil Rikhard	(Kazakhstan)	GK	27 February 1974 (aged 39)	Tobol	2014		
31	David Loria	(Kazakhstan)	GK	31 October 1981 (aged 32)	Çaykur Rizespor	2013	13	0
41	Andrey Andreev	(Kazakhstan)	GK	14 March 1994 (aged 19)	Academy	2012	0	0
44	Vladimir Groshev	(Kazakhstan)	GK	4 January 1995 (aged 18)	Academy	2012	0	0
45	Denis Shchipkov	(Kazakhstan)	GK	27 July 1994 (aged 19)	Academy	2012	0	0
Defenders
2	Daniel Addo	(Ghana)	DF	3 September 1989 (aged 24)	loan from Zorya Luhansk	2013	20	0
3	Mark Gorman	(Kazakhstan)	DF	9 February 1989 (aged 24)	Lokomotiv Astana	2012	55	1
4	Sergey Keyler	(Kazakhstan)	DF	8 November 1994 (aged 18)	Tsesna	2012	18	1
5	Aleksandr Kislitsyn	(Kazakhstan)	DF	8 March 1986 (aged 27)	Tobol	2013	29	3
6	Argen Zhumateev	(Kazakhstan)	DF	21 October 1994 (aged 19)	Academy	2012	1	0
15	Kasymzhan Taipov	(Kazakhstan)	DF	19 February 1995 (aged 18)	Academy	2012	0	0
18	Timur Rudoselskiy	(Kazakhstan)	DF	21 December 1994 (aged 18)	Academy	2012	0	0
20	Ľubomír Michalík	(Slovakia)	DF	13 August 1983 (aged 30)	Portsmouth	2013	28	0
46	Galymzhan Bersugurov	(Kazakhstan)	DF	23 November 1993 (aged 19)	Academy	2013	0	0
48	Dilshat Musayev	(Kazakhstan)	DF	9 January 1995 (aged 18)	Academy	2012	0	0
49	Anuar Umashov	(Kazakhstan)	DF	30 August 1995 (aged 18)	Academy	2012	0	0
55	Alikhan Shabdenov	(Kazakhstan)	DF	19 June 1994 (aged 19)	Academy	2012	0	0
60	Ruslan Zununov	(Kazakhstan)	DF	31 December 1993 (aged 19)	Academy	2013	0	0
65	Kanat Dauletbakov	(Kazakhstan)	DF	3 May 1994 (aged 19)	Academy	2012	0	0
88	Samat Smakov	(Kazakhstan)	DF	8 December 1978 (aged 34)	Çaykur Rizespor	2013	6	0
Midfielders
7	Ruslan Sakhalbaev	(Kazakhstan)	MF	27 June 1984 (aged 29)	Aktobe	2012	38	3
8	Stuart Duff	(Scotland)	MF	23 January 1982 (aged 31)	Qormi	2012	53	1
10	Josip Knežević	(Croatia)	MF	3 October 1988 (aged 25)	Amkar Perm	2013	46	17
11	Ilya Kalinin	(Kazakhstan)	MF	3 February 1992 (aged 21)	Tsesna	2012	35	2
13	Vitali Li	(Kazakhstan)	MF	13 March 1994 (aged 19)	loan from Shakhter Karagandy	2013	12	4
18	Alexei Eremenko	(Finland)	MF	24 March 1983 (aged 30)	Rubin Kazan	2013	10	0
22	Kirill Shestakov	(Kazakhstan)	MF	19 June 1985 (aged 28)	Vostok	2011		
23	Nikita Utrobin	(Kazakhstan)	MF	3 January 1994 (aged 19)	Tsesna	2012	6	0
24	Anton Zemlianukhin	(Kyrgyzstan)	MF	11 December 1988 (aged 24)	Aktobe	2013	4	1
25	Vladyslav Nekhtiy	(Ukraine)	MF	19 December 1991 (aged 21)	Shakhtar Donetsk	2013	9	0
26	Anuar Jagippar	(Kazakhstan)	MF	2 January 1995 (aged 18)	Academy	2013	0	0
27	Artur Yedigaryan	(Armenia)	MF	26 June 1987 (aged 26)	Hoverla Uzhhorod	2013	10	1
33	Kazbek Geteriev	(Kazakhstan)	MF	30 June 1985 (aged 28)	Alania Vladikavkaz	2013	20	0
42	Bauyrzhan Tanirbergenov	(Kazakhstan)	MF	11 February 1995 (aged 18)	Academy	2012	0	0
47	Arman Nyusup	(Kazakhstan)	MF	22 January 1994 (aged 19)	Academy	2012	0	0
50	Kasymkhan Talasbayev	(Kazakhstan)	MF	27 February 1993 (aged 20)	Tsesna	2012	1	0
53	Nurlan Dairov	(Kazakhstan)	MF	26 June 1995 (aged 18)	Academy	2012	0	0
54	Dosim Ocasov	(Kazakhstan)	MF	5 February 1993 (aged 20)	Academy	2013	0	0
56	Madiyar Raimbek	(Kazakhstan)	MF	15 August 1995 (aged 18)	Academy	2012	0	0
59	Aslan Orazaev	(Kazakhstan)	MF	7 May 1992 (aged 21)	Academy	2013	0	0
66	Nurzharyk Kunov	(Kazakhstan)	MF	22 October 1993 (aged 20)	Sunkar	2012	1	0
67	Oybek Baltabaev	(Kazakhstan)	MF	13 June 1994 (aged 19)	Academy	2012	0	0
77	Zhambyl Kukeyev	(Kazakhstan)	MF	20 September 1988 (aged 25)	Shakhter Karagandy	2013	14	2
Forwards
9	Timur Baizhanov	(Kazakhstan)	FW	30 March 1990 (aged 23)	Irtysh Pavlodar	2013	15	3
21	Momodou Ceesay	(The Gambia)	FW	24 December 1988 (aged 24)	MŠK Žilina	2013	26	12
29	Rauan Sariev	(Kazakhstan)	FW	21 October 1994 (aged 19)	Botafogo	2013	7	0
44	Galym Rayshanov	(Kazakhstan)	FW	27 February 1992 (aged 21)	Academy	2013	0	0
45	Magamed Uzdenov	(Kazakhstan)	FW	25 February 1994 (aged 19)	Academy	2012	4	0
57	Magomed Paragulgov	(Kazakhstan)	FW	27 March 1994 (aged 19)	Olé Brasil	2012	0	0
63	Boris Donchenko	(Kazakhstan)	FW	5 June 1995 (aged 18)	Academy	2012	0	0
64	Georgy Makaev	(Kazakhstan)	FW	12 August 1994 (aged 19)	Tsesna	2012	1	0
Players away on loan
14	Vladimir Vyatkin	(Kazakhstan)	MF	30 April 1991 (aged 22)	Tsesna	2012	1	0
17	Oleg Nedashkovsky	(Kazakhstan)	MF	9 September 1987 (aged 26)	Taraz	2012	30	10
Players that left during the season
1	Andrei Shabanov	(Kazakhstan)	GK	17 November 1986 (aged 26)	Atyrau	2012	10	0
19	Jesús Rabanal	(Peru)	DF	25 December 1984 (aged 28)	Alianza Lima	2013	0	0

== Transfers ==
=== Winter ===
In: Note: Flags indicate national team as defined under FIFA eligibility rules; some limited exceptions apply. Players may hold more than one non-FIFA nationality.

No.	Pos.	Nation	Player
2	DF	GHA	Daniel Addo (loan from (Ukraine) Zorya Luhansk)
5	DF	KAZ	Aleksandr Kislitsyn (from (Kazakhstan) Tobol)
9	FW	KAZ	Timur Baizhanov (from (Kazakhstan) Irtysh)
19	DF	PER	Jesús Rabanal (from (Peru) Alianza Lima)
20	DF	SVK	Ľubomír Michalík (from (England) Portsmouth)
21	FW	GAM	Momodou Ceesay (from (Slovakia) MŠK Žilina)
25	MF	UKR	Vladyslav Nekhtiy
30	GK	KAZ	Daniil Rikhard (from (Kazakhstan) Tobol)
33	MF	KAZ	Kazbek Geteriev (from (Russia) Alania Vladikavkaz)

Out: Note: Flags indicate national team as defined under FIFA eligibility rules; some limited exceptions apply. Players may hold more than one non-FIFA nationality.

No.	Pos.	Nation	Player
4	DF	KAZ	Ilya Vorotnikov (to (Kazakhstan) Akzhayik)
6	MF	KAZ	Rakhimzhan Rozybakiyev
10	MF	KAZ	Ruslan Baltiev (Retired)
14	MF	KAZ	Nursayn Zholdasov
15	MF	KAZ	Yevgeni Lyovin
16	MF	ESP	Alberto Heredia
18	MF	KAZ	Dmitriy Mamonov (to (Kazakhstan) Zhetysu)
27	DF	SRB	Marko Đorđević (to (Kazakhstan) Okzhetpes)
35	GK	KAZ	Ramil Nurmukhametov (to (Kazakhstan) Taraz)
37	FW	KAZ	Kanat Akhmetov
43	FW	ESP	Souto (to (New Zealand) Auckland City)
44	FW	ESP	Óscar (to (Spain) Loja)
45	DF	BLR	Alyaksandr Bychanok (loan return to (Belarus) Dinamo Minsk)

=== Summer ===
In: Note: Flags indicate national team as defined under FIFA eligibility rules; some limited exceptions apply. Players may hold more than one non-FIFA nationality.

No.	Pos.	Nation	Player
13	MF	KAZ	Vitali Li (loan from (Kazakhstan) Shakhter Karagandy)
18	MF	FIN	Alexei Eremenko (from (Russia) Rubin Kazan)
27	MF	ARM	Artur Yedigaryan (from (Ukraine) Hoverla Uzhhorod)
31	GK	KAZ	David Loria (from (Turkey) Çaykur Rizespor)
77	MF	KAZ	Zhambyl Kukeyev (from (Kazakhstan) Shakhter Karagandy)
88	DF	KAZ	Samat Smakov (from (Turkey) Çaykur Rizespor)
—	MF	KGZ	Anton Zemlianukhin (from (Kazakhstan) Aktobe)

Out: Note: Flags indicate national team as defined under FIFA eligibility rules; some limited exceptions apply. Players may hold more than one non-FIFA nationality.

No.	Pos.	Nation	Player
14	MF	KAZ	Vladimir Vyatkin (loan to (Kazakhstan) Ak Bulak)
17	MF	KAZ	Oleg Nedashkovsky (loan to (Kazakhstan) Sunkar)
19	DF	PER	Jesús Rabanal (to (Peru) Universidad César Vallejo)

== Competitions ==
=== Kazakhstan Premier League ===
==== First round ====
===== Results summary =====
Overall								Home						Away					
Pld	W	D	L	GF	GA	GD	Pts	W	D	L	GF	GA	GD	W	D	L	GF	GA	GD
22	7	10	5	28	24	+4	31	6	4	1	19	12	+7	1	6	4	9	12	−3

Last updated: 2 October 2015.
Source: Soccerway

===== Results by round =====
Round	1	2	3	4	5	6	7	8	9	10	11	12	13	14	15	16	17	18	19	20	21	22
Ground																						
Result																						
Position																						

Source: Soccerway
A = Away; H = Home; W = Win; D = Draw; L = Loss

===== Results =====
9 March 2013 1	Kairat	3 – 3	Zhetysu	Almaty
15:00 (UTC+6)	Ceesay 38', 52'; Shestakov (yellow card) 63'; O.Nedashkovsky 88'	Summary	Z.Korobov (yellow card) 34'; A.Totay 46'; Salomov 48' (pen.); Averchenko 68'; Melziddinov (yellow card) 86'; Shchotkin (yellow card) 90+3'	Stadium: Central Stadium; Attendance: 3,000; Referee: Igor Aleshin

15 March 2013 2	Astana	0 – 0	Kairat	Astana
17:00 (UTC+6)	Korobkin (yellow card) 34'	Summary	Knežević (yellow card) 52'	Stadium: Astana Arena; Attendance: 2,000; Referee: Akmalkhan Kholmatov

30 March 2013 3	Kairat	0 – 0	Atyrau	Almaty
14:00 (UTC+6)	Kislitsyn (yellow card) 53'; O.Nedashkovsky (yellow card) 86'	Summary	Samchenko (yellow card) 58'; Milanković (yellow card) 88'; Boychenko (yellow card) 90+3'	Stadium: Central Stadium; Attendance: 6,000; Referee: Aleksandr Gauzer

6 April 2013 4	Taraz	2 – 1	Kairat	Taraz
16:30 (UTC+6)	Curto 12' (yellow card) 90+2'; Diakate 48'; Odita (yellow card) 70'; R.Nurmukhametov (yellow card) 90'	Summary	Michalík (yellow card) 70'; Baizhanov 71'; Kislitsyn (yellow card) 85'	Stadium: Central Stadium; Attendance: 8,300; Referee: Ruslan Duzmambetov

14 April 2013 5	Kairat	4 – 2	Tobol	Almaty
15:00 (UTC+6)	Ceesay 6', 44'; Gorman 27'; O.Nedashkovsky 59'	Summary	Bugaiov (yellow card) 25' (goal) 55'; Zhumaskaliyev 36'; B.Baytana (yellow card) 47'	Stadium: Central Stadium; Attendance: 7,000; Referee: Igor Khisamutdinov

20 April 2013 6	Kairat	2 – 1	Akzhayik	Almaty
17:00 (UTC+6)	Addo (yellow card) 9'; O.Nedashkovsky 31'; S.Keiler 90+4'	Summary	Černý (yellow card) 22'; B.Omarov (yellow card) 52'; Zyankovich 63'	Stadium: Central Stadium; Attendance: 7,000; Referee: Artyom Kuchin

24 April 2013 7	Ordabasy	1 – 0	Kairat	Shymkent
17:00 (UTC+6)	Nurgaliev (yellow card) 4'; Mukhtarov (yellow card) 31'; B.Kozhabayev (yellow card) 35'; Mansour 67'; Arouri (yellow card) 72'	Summary		Stadium: Kazhymukan Munaitpasov Stadium; Attendance: 4,500; Referee: Igor Aleshin

28 April 2013 8	Kairat	2 – 0	Vostok	Almaty
15:00 (UTC+6)	Knežević 18', 49' (pen.); Shestakov (yellow card) 35'; O.Nedashkovsky (yellow card) 39'	Summary	Sánchez (yellow card) 18'; Nesterenko (yellow card) 48'; Dosmagambetov (yellow card) 88'; I.Shevchenko (yellow card) 90'	Stadium: Central Stadium; Attendance: 4,500; Referee: Bolat Karlibayev

5 May 2013 9	Shakhter Karagandy	2 – 1	Kairat	Temirtau
17:30 (UTC+6)	Vasiljević (yellow card) 23'; Finonchenko 57'; Khizhnichenko 67'; Tarasov (yellow card) 72'	Summary	Kislitsyn (yellow card) 23'; Knežević (yellow card) 26'; R.Sariev (yellow card) 35'; Shestakov (yellow card) 53'; Gorman (yellow card) 75'; Baizhanov 83'	Stadium: Metallurg Stadium; Attendance: 3,000; Referee: Askhat Abdanbayev

11 May 2013 10	Kairat	1 – 0	Aktobe	Almaty
17:00 (UTC+6)	Baizhanov (yellow card) 7'; O.Nedashkovsky 47'	Summary	Muldarov (yellow card) 13'; Kharabara (yellow card) 31'; Geynrikh (yellow card) 82'; Khairullin (yellow card) 90+2'	Stadium: Central Stadium; Attendance: 11,000; Referee: Ruslan Duzmambetov

18 May 2013 11	Irtysh	2 – 1	Kairat	Pavlodar
18:00 (UTC+6)	Strukov 23'; A.Dauletkhanov; Govedarica 90+3'; T.Khalmuratov (yellow card) 90+4'	Summary	Gorman (yellow card) 38'; O.Nedashkovsky (yellow card) 59'; Baizhanov 77'; Michalík (yellow card) 78'; Knežević (yellow card) 90+4'; Ceesay (yellow card) 90+4'	Stadium: Central Stadium; Attendance: 4,800; Referee: Aleksandr Gauzer

22 May 2013 12	Kairat	1 – 2	Astana	Almaty
17:00 (UTC+6)	Knežević 36'; S.Keiler (yellow card) 90+2'	Summary	Nusserbayev 12'; Ostapenko (yellow card) 77'; Kojašević 78'; Nurdauletov (yellow card) 85'	Stadium: Central Stadium; Attendance: 6,500; Referee: Artyom Kuchin

26 May 2013 13	Atyrau	1 – 1	Kairat	Atyrau
17:00 (UTC+6)	Fomin (yellow card) 72'; T.Danilyuk 86' (yellow card) 86'	Summary	Shestakov (yellow card) 40'; Duff (yellow card) 57'; Ceesay (yellow card) 78' (goal) 90+4'	Stadium: Munaishy Stadium; Attendance: 3,000; Referee: Igor Khisamutdinov

30 May 2013 14	Kairat	2 – 1	Taraz	Almaty
17:00 (UTC+6)	Ceesay 15'; O.Nedashkovsky 28' (yellow card) 72'; Addo (yellow card) 45'; Geteriev (yellow card) 70'; Michalík (yellow card) 72'; Baizhanov (yellow card) 89'	Summary	Z.Konstantin 11'; D.Evstigneev (yellow card) 21'; A.Tsvetkov (yellow card) 58'	Stadium: Central Stadium; Attendance: 6,500; Referee: Anatolyi Vishnichenko

14 June 2013 15	Tobol	2 – 3	Kairat	Kostanay
19:00 (UTC+6)	Tonev 44'; Bugaiov 78'; E.Nurgaliyev (yellow card) 88'	Summary	Duff (yellow card) 15'; Ceesay 20'; Kukeyev 24'; Knežević 73' (pen.) (yellow card) 88'	Stadium: Central Stadium; Attendance: 4,500; Referee: Marat Iskakov

23 June 2013 16	Akzhayik	0 – 0	Kairat	Oral
20:00 (UTC+6)	S.Shevtsov (yellow card) 41'; B.Omarov (yellow card) 80'; E.Kostrub (yellow card) 85'	Summary	Ceesay (yellow card) 85'	Stadium: Petr Atoyan Stadium; Attendance: 6,000; Referee: Igor Aleshin

29 June 2013 17	Kairat	0 – 0	Ordabasy	Almaty
19:30 (UTC+6)	Kukeyev (yellow card) 15'	Summary	R.Pakholyuk (yellow card) 18'; Mukhtarov (yellow card) 44'; B.Beisenov (yellow card) 52'	Stadium: Central Stadium; Attendance: 9,000; Referee: Bolat Karlibayev

6 July 2013 18	Vostok	1 – 1	Kairat	Oskemen
19:30 (UTC+6)	Kostyuk 22'	Summary	V.Li (yellow card) 20' (goal) 72'; I.Kalinin (yellow card) 64'	Stadium: Vostok Stadium; Attendance: 1,300; Referee: Igor Khisamutdinov

13 July 2013 19	Kairat	1 – 1	Shakhter Karagandy	Almaty
19:30 (UTC+6)	Yedigaryan (yellow card) 70'; Kislitsyn 90' (yellow card) 90'	Summary	Khizhnichenko 15'; V.Borovskiy (yellow card) 40'; Finonchenko (yellow card) 73'; M.Gabyshev (yellow card) 81'	Stadium: Central Stadium; Attendance: 7,500; Referee: Anatolyi Vishnichenko

21 July 2013 20	Aktobe	1 – 1	Kairat	Aktobe
20:00 (UTC+6)	Khairullin 50'	Summary	Zemlianukhin 71'; Addo (yellow card) 90+4'	Stadium: Central Stadium; Attendance: 10,000; Referee: Igor Aleshin

28 July 2013 21	Kairat	3 – 2	Irtysh	Almaty
19:30 (UTC+6)	Kislitsyn 10'; V.Li 26'; Kukeyev 29'; Knežević (yellow card) 42'; Duff (yellow card) 65'	Summary	Shomko (yellow card) 42'; Strukov 64'; K.Begalyn 83'	Stadium: Central Stadium; Attendance: 9,800; Referee: Akmalkhan Kholmatov

4 August 2013 22	Zhetysu	0 – 0	Kairat	Taldykorgan
19:00 (UTC+6)	Klimavičius (yellow card) 53'	Summary	Knežević (yellow card) 44'; Shestakov (yellow card) 90+2'	Stadium: Zhetysu Stadium; Attendance: 3,000; Referee: Denis Tevyashov

===== League table =====
Pos	Team	Pld	W	D	L	GF	GA	GD	Pts	Qualification
3	Shakhter Karagandy	22	10	5	7	31	23	+8	35	Qualification for the championship round
4	Irtysh Pavlodar	22	9	7	6	24	20	+4	34	Qualification for the championship round
5	Kairat	22	7	10	5	28	24	+4	31	Qualification for the championship round
6	Ordabasy	22	8	6	8	20	20	0	30	Qualification for the championship round
7	Atyrau	22	7	6	9	18	28	−10	27	Qualification for the relegation round

Source: FFK (in Russian)
Rules for classification: 1st points;
Two team tiebreak: 1st overall wins; 2nd head-to-head record; 3rd goals difference; 4th goals scored; 5th away goals scored;
Multiple teams tiebreak: 1st overall wins; 2nd goals difference; 3rd goals scored; 4th away goals scored

==== Championship round ====
===== Results summary =====
Overall								Home						Away					
Pld	W	D	L	GF	GA	GD	Pts	W	D	L	GF	GA	GD	W	D	L	GF	GA	GD
10	5	2	3	16	14	+2	17	1	2	2	7	7	0	4	0	1	9	7	+2

Last updated: 1 October 2015.
Source: Soccerway

===== Results by round =====
Round	1	2	3	4	5	6	7	8	9	10
Ground	H	A	H	A	H	H	A	H	A	A
Result	W	D	D	W	D	L	W	D	W	W
Position										

Source: Soccerway
A = Away; H = Home; W = Win; D = Draw; L = Loss

===== Results =====
18 August 2013 23	Kairat	3 – 1	Irtysh	Almaty
19:30 (UTC+6)	Ceesay 7', 63'; R.Sakhalbaev 49'; Michalík (yellow card) 56'; Addo (yellow card) 70'	Summary	Chichulin (yellow card) 53'; Kučera (yellow card) 58'; Ceesay 77' (o.g.)	Stadium: Central Stadium; Attendance: 8,000; Referee: Ruslan Duzmambetov

25 August 2013 24	Aktobe	2 – 0	Kairat	Aktobe
20:00 (UTC+6)	Geynrikh 21'; Muldarov (yellow card) 38'; Kapadze 77'	Summary	V.Li (yellow card) 68'; Shestakov (yellow card) 73'; Kukeyev (yellow card) 88'	Stadium: Central Stadium; Attendance: 10,000; Referee: Artyom Kuchin

30 August 2013 25	Kairat	1 – 2	Astana	Almaty
19:30 (UTC+6)	Ceesay 79'	Summary	Kojašević 21'; Ostapenko 66' (yellow card) 74'; Igumanović (yellow card) 90+2'	Stadium: Central Stadium; Attendance: 9,000; Referee: Igor Khisamutdinov

15 September 2013 26	Ordabasy	1 – 2	Kairat	Shymkent
17:00 (UTC+6)	Junuzović 14'; Aliev (yellow card) 45'; Arouri (yellow card) 64'; Ashirbekov (yellow card) 63'	Summary	Ceesay 58'; Knežević 73'; Yedigaryan (yellow card) 76'	Stadium: Kazhymukan Munaitpasov Stadium; Attendance: 4,000; Referee: Bolat Karlibayev

22 September 2013 27	Kairat	3 – 3	Shakhter Karagandy	Almaty
18:00 (UTC+6)	Ceesay 33'; V.Li 36'; Yedigaryan 56'; Duff (yellow card) 69'; Loria (yellow card) 72'; Michalík (yellow card) 87'	Summary	A.Borantaev (yellow card) 16'; Finonchenko 83', 88'; Baizhanov (yellow card) 85'; Zyankovich 90+3'	Stadium: Central Stadium; Attendance: 11,000; Referee: Anatolyi Vishnichenko

29 September 2013 28	Kairat	0 – 1	Aktobe	Almaty
18:00 (UTC+6)	Yedigaryan (yellow card) 19'	Summary	Muldarov (yellow card) 79'; P.Badlo 90+1' (yellow card) 90+1'	Stadium: Central Stadium; Attendance: 12,000; Referee: Igor Aleshin

5 October 2013 29	Astana	1 – 2	Kairat	Astana
17:00 (UTC+6)	Twumasi 45+1'; Zelão (yellow card) 90+1'; Shakhmetov (yellow card) 90+5'; Erić (yellow card) 90+5'	Summary	Eremenko (yellow card) 23'; Kislitsyn (yellow card) 61'; Yedigaryan (yellow card) 61'; V.Li (yellow card) 77' (goal) 81'; Knežević 84'; Smakov (yellow card) 86'; Duff (yellow card) 86'; Kukeyev (yellow card) 90+5'	Stadium: Astana Arena; Attendance: 3,000; Referee: Artyom Kuchin

19 October 2013 30	Kairat	0 – 0	Ordabasy	Almaty
18:00 (UTC+6)		Summary	Irismetov (yellow card) 19'; R.Pakholyuk (yellow card) 75'; B.Beyssenov (yellow card) 88'; Aliev (yellow card) 90+4'	Stadium: Central Stadium; Attendance: 14,000; Referee: Marat Iskakov

27 October 2013 31	Shakhter Karagandy	1 – 2	Kairat	Karaganda
15:00 (UTC+6)	Zyankovich 25' (pen.); Malyi (yellow card) 46'	Summary	Knežević 19', 73'; Ceesay (yellow card) 25'; Yedigaryan (yellow card) 43'; Shestakov (yellow card) 72'	Stadium: Shakhter Stadium; Attendance: 3,500; Referee: Ruslan Duzmambetov

2 November 2013 32	Irtysh	2 – 3	Kairat	Pavlodar
15:00 (UTC+6)	K.Begalyn 51'; Averchenko 58'; Coulibaly (yellow card) 86'	Summary	Knežević 32' (pen.), 85' (pen.); V.Li (yellow card) 56'; R.Sakhalbaev 90+3'	Stadium: Central Stadium; Attendance: 1,800; Referee: Artyom Kuchin

===== Table =====
Pos	Team	Pld	W	D	L	GF	GA	GD	Pts	Qualification
1	Aktobe (C)	32	20	6	6	46	22	+24	43	Qualification for the Champions League second qualifying round
2	Astana	32	19	5	8	54	35	+19	42	Qualification for the Europa League first qualifying round
3	Kairat	32	12	12	8	44	38	+6	33	Qualification for the Europa League first qualifying round
4	Irtysh Pavlodar	32	12	8	12	41	39	+2	27	
5	Shakhter Karagandy	32	12	7	13	43	45	−2	26	Qualification for the Europa League first qualifying round (Note: Shakter qualified for the 2014–15 UEFA Europa League first qualifying round by winning the 2013 Kazakhstan Cup.)
6	Ordabasy	32	11	8	13	33	34	−1	23	

Source: Soccerway
Rules for classification: 1st points;
Two team tiebreak: 1st overall wins; 2nd head-to-head record; 3rd goals difference; 4th goals scored; 5th away goals scored;
Multiple teams tiebreak: 1st overall wins; 2nd goals difference; 3rd goals scored; 4th away goals scored.
(C) Champions

=== Kazakhstan Cup ===
10 April 2013 First Round	Okzhetpes	0 – 0 (a.e.t.) (3 – 4 p)	Kairat	Kokshetau
15:30 (UTC+6)	D.Peterson (yellow card) 42'; Buleshev (yellow card) 85'	Summary	Baizhanov (yellow card) 59'; Shestakov (yellow card) 90'; Nekhtiy (yellow card) 109'	Stadium: Okzhetpes Stadium; Referee: I.Filatov

2 May 2013 Second Round	Shakhter Karagandy	2 – 1	Kairat	Temirtau
17:30 (UTC+6)	Simčević (yellow card) 13'; Finonchenko 40'; Vasiljević (yellow card) 45'; Khizhnichenko (yellow card) 77'; Tazhimbetov (yellow card) 87'	Summary	Duff (yellow card) 54'; Shestakov (yellow card) 60'; Kislitsyn 74'; Michalík (yellow card) 90'	Stadium: Metallurg Stadium; Attendance: 1,500; Referee: Denis Tevyashov

== Squad statistics ==
As of Match played 2 November 2013

=== Appearances and goals ===
No.	Pos	Nat	Player	Total		Premier League		Kazakhstan Cup	
No.	Pos	Nat	Player	Apps	Goals	Apps	Goals	Apps	Goals
2	DF	(Ghana) GHA	Daniel Addo	20	0	14+4	0	2	0
3	DF	(Kazakhstan) KAZ	Mark Gorman	27	1	25	1	2	0
4	DF	(Kazakhstan) KAZ	Sergei Keiler	17	1	13+3	1	0+1	0
5	DF	(Kazakhstan) KAZ	Aleksandr Kislitsyn	29	3	27	2	2	1
6	DF	(Kazakhstan) KAZ	Argen Zhumataev	1	0	1	0	0	0
7	MF	(Kazakhstan) KAZ	Ruslan Sakhalbaev	20	2	12+7	2	0+1	0
8	MF	(Scotland) SCO	Stuart Duff	27	0	18+8	0	1	0
9	FW	(Kazakhstan) KAZ	Timur Baizhanov	15	3	4+10	3	1	0
10	MF	(Croatia) CRO	Josip Knežević	29	10	26+1	10	2	0
11	MF	(Kazakhstan) KAZ	Ilya Kalinin	14	0	5+8	0	1	0
13	MF	(Kazakhstan) KAZ	Vitali Li	12	4	10+2	4	0	0
18	MF	(Finland) FIN	Alexei Eremenko	10	0	5+5	0	0	0
20	DF	(Slovakia) SVK	Ľubomír Michalík	28	0	26	0	2	0
21	FW	(The Gambia) GAM	Momodou Ceesay	26	12	24+1	12	1	0
22	MF	(Kazakhstan) KAZ	Kirill Shestakov	24	0	15+7	0	2	0
24	MF	(Kyrgyzstan) KGZ	Anton Zemlianukhin	4	1	2+2	1	0	0
25	MF	(Ukraine) UKR	Vladyslav Nekhtiy	9	0	2+6	0	0+1	0
27	MF	(Armenia) ARM	Artur Yedigaryan	10	1	9+1	1	0	0
29	FW	(Kazakhstan) KAZ	Rauan Sariev	7	0	2+4	0	1	0
30	GK	(Kazakhstan) KAZ	Daniil Rikhard	18	0	16	0	2	0
31	GK	(Kazakhstan) KAZ	David Loria	12	0	12	0	0	0
33	MF	(Kazakhstan) KAZ	Kazbek Geteriev	20	0	15+3	0	2	0
77	MF	(Kazakhstan) KAZ	Zhambyl Kukeyev	14	2	11+3	2	0	0
88	DF	(Kazakhstan) KAZ	Samat Smakov	6	0	5+1	0	0	0
Players away from Kairat on loan:
14	MF	(Kazakhstan) KAZ	Vladimir Vyatkin	1	0	0	0	0+1	0
17	MF	(Kazakhstan) KAZ	Oleg Nedashkovsky	21	5	13+6	5	1+1	0
Players who appeared for Kairat that left during the season:

=== Goal scorers ===
Place	Position	Nation	Number	Name	Premier League	Kazakhstan Cup	Total
1	FW	(The Gambia)	21	Momodou Ceesay	12	0	12
2	MF	(Croatia)	10	Josip Knežević	10	0	10
3	MF	(Kazakhstan)	17	Oleg Nedashkovsky	5	0	5
4	MF	(Kazakhstan)	13	Vitali Li	4	0	4
5	FW	(Kazakhstan)	9	Timur Baizhanov	3	0	3
5	DF	(Kazakhstan)	5	Aleksandr Kislitsyn	2	1	3
7	MF	(Kazakhstan)	77	Zhambyl Kukeyev	2	0	2
7	MF	(Kazakhstan)	7	Ruslan Sakhalbaev	2	0	2
9	DF	(Kazakhstan)	3	Mark Gorman	1	0	1
9	DF	(Kazakhstan)	4	Sergei Keiler	1	0	1
9	MF	(Armenia)	27	Artur Yedigaryan	1	0	1
9	MF	(Kyrgyzstan)	24	Anton Zemlianukhin	1	0	1
				TOTALS	44	1	45

=== Disciplinary record ===
Number	Nation	Position	Name	Premier League		Kazakhstan Cup		Total	
Number	Nation	Position	Name	Yellow card	Red card	Yellow card	Red card	Yellow card	Red card
2	(Ghana)	DF	Daniel Addo	4	0	0	0	4	0
3	(Kazakhstan)	DF	Mark Gorman	2	0	0	0	2	0
4	(Kazakhstan)	DF	Sergei Keiler	1	0	0	0	1	0
5	(Kazakhstan)	DF	Aleksandr Kislitsyn	5	0	0	0	5	0
8	(Scotland)	MF	Stuart Duff	5	0	1	0	6	0
9	(Kazakhstan)	FW	Timur Baizhanov	2	0	1	0	3	0
10	(Croatia)	MF	Josip Knežević	6	0	0	0	6	0
11	(Kazakhstan)	MF	Ilya Kalinin	1	0	0	0	1	0
13	(Kazakhstan)	MF	Vitali Li	4	0	0	0	4	0
18	(Finland)	MF	Alexei Eremenko	1	0	0	0	1	0
20	(Slovakia)	DF	Ľubomír Michalík	5	0	1	0	6	0
21	(The Gambia)	FW	Momodou Ceesay	4	0	0	0	4	0
22	(Kazakhstan)	MF	Kirill Shestakov	7	0	2	0	9	0
25	(Ukraine)	MF	Vladyslav Nekhtiy	0	0	1	0	1	0
27	(Armenia)	MF	Artur Yedigaryan	5	0	0	0	5	0
29	(Kazakhstan)	FW	Rauan Sariev	1	0	0	0	1	0
31	(Kazakhstan)	GK	David Loria	1	0	0	0	1	0
33	(Kazakhstan)	MF	Kazbek Geteriev	1	0	0	0	1	0
77	(Kazakhstan)	MF	Zhambyl Kukeyev	3	0	0	0	3	0
88	(Kazakhstan)	DF	Samat Smakov	1	0	0	0	1	0
Players away on loan:
17	(Kazakhstan)	MF	Oleg Nedashkovsky	4	0	0	0	4	0
			TOTALS	63	0	6	0	69	0
