= 2012 FC Kairat season =

FC Kairat
2012 season
- Chairman: Kairat Boranbayev
- Manager: Dmitriy Ogai (until 6 June); José Pérez Serer (from 6 June)
- Stadium: Central Stadium
- Kazakhstan Premier League: 10th
- Kazakhstan Cup: Second Round vs Kaisar
- Top goalscorer: League: Josip Knežević (6); All: Josip Knežević (7)
Home colours	Away colours	Third colours

The 2012 FC Kairat season was the 2nd successive season that the club playing in the Kazakhstan Premier League, the highest tier of association football in Kazakhstan, since their promotion back to the top flight in 2009. Kairat finished the season in 10th place and reached the Second Round of the Kazakhstan Cup.

== Squad ==
As of match played 28 October 2012

No.	Name	Nationality	Position	Date of birth (age)	Signed from	Signed in	Apps.	Goals
Goalkeepers
1	Andrei Shabanov	(Kazakhstan)	GK	17 November 1986 (aged 25)	Atyrau	2012	10	0
31	Ildar Shaikheslamov	(Kazakhstan)	GK	27 July 1989 (aged 23)	Tsesna	2012	1	0
35	Ramil Nurmukhametov	(Kazakhstan)	GK	21 December 1987 (aged 24)	Taraz	2012	19	0
49	Vladimir Groshev	(Kazakhstan)	GK	1 April 1995 (aged 17)	Tsesna	2012	0	0
71	Denis Shchipkov	(Kazakhstan)	GK	27 July 1994 (aged 18)	Academy	2012	0	0
94	Andrey Andreev	(Kazakhstan)	GK	14 March 1994 (aged 18)	Academy	2012	0	0
Defenders
4	Ilya Vorotnikov	(Kazakhstan)	DF	1 February 1986 (aged 26)	Atyrau	2011	43	0
14	Nursayn Zholdasov	(Kazakhstan)	DF	11 May 1991 (aged 21)	Ordabasy	2011	9	0
27	Marko Đorđević	(Serbia)	DF	22 May 1983 (aged 29)	Jagodina	2011	45	3
29	Mark Gorman	(Kazakhstan)	DF	9 February 1989 (aged 23)	Lokomotiv Astana	2012	28	0
45	Alyaksandr Bychanok	(Belarus)	DF	30 May 1985 (aged 27)	loan from Dinamo Minsk	2012	7	0
47	Sergey Keyler	(Kazakhstan)	DF	8 November 1994 (aged 17)	Tsesna	2012	1	0
55	Kasymzhan Taipov	(Kazakhstan)	DF	19 February 1995 (aged 17)	Academy	2012	0	0
69	Kanat Dauletbakov	(Kazakhstan)	DF	3 May 1994 (aged 18)	Academy	2012	0	0
70	Timur Rudoselskiy	(Kazakhstan)	DF	21 December 1994 (aged 17)	Academy	2012	0	0
78	Dilshat Musayev	(Kazakhstan)	DF	9 January 1995 (aged 17)	Academy	2012	0	0
93	Alikhan Shabdenov	(Kazakhstan)	DF	19 June 1994 (aged 18)	Academy	2012	0	0
98	Anuar Umashov	(Kazakhstan)	DF	30 August 1995 (aged 17)	Academy	2012	0	0
Midfielders
6	Rakhimzhan Rozybakiyev	(Kazakhstan)	MF	2 January 1991 (aged 21)	Academy	2009		
7	Ruslan Sakhalbaev	(Kazakhstan)	MF	27 June 1984 (aged 28)	Aktobe	2012	18	1
10	Ruslan Baltiev	(Kazakhstan)	MF	16 September 1978 (aged 34)	Zhemchuzhina-Sochi	2011	25	2
15	Evgeni Levin	(Kazakhstan)	MF	12 July 1992 (aged 20)	loan from Ordabasy	2012	18	0
16	Alberto Heredia	(Spain)	MF	20 December 1982 (aged 29)	Lorca Atlético	2012	20	0
18	Dmitriy Mamonov	(Kazakhstan)	MF	26 April 1978 (aged 34)	Vostok	2012	15	1
20	Ilya Kalinin	(Kazakhstan)	MF	3 February 1992 (aged 20)	Tsesna	2012	21	2
21	Stuart Duff	(Scotland)	MF	23 January 1982 (aged 30)	Qormi	2012	26	1
22	Kirill Shestakov	(Kazakhstan)	MF	19 June 1985 (aged 27)	Vostok	2011	54	0
30	Josip Knežević	(Croatia)	MF	3 October 1988 (aged 24)	loan from Amkar Perm	2012	17	7
32	Nurzharyk Kunov	(Kazakhstan)	MF	22 October 1993 (aged 19)	Sunkar	2012	1	0
53	Nurlan Dairov	(Kazakhstan)	MF	26 June 1995 (aged 17)	Academy	2012	0	0
66	Rinat Dzhanlau	(Kazakhstan)	MF	18 March 1994 (aged 18)	Academy	2012	0	0
67	Oybek Baltabaev	(Kazakhstan)	MF	13 June 1994 (aged 18)	Academy	2012	0	0
77	Argen Zhumateev	(Kazakhstan)	MF	21 October 1994 (aged 18)	Academy	2012	0	0
80	Daniyar Kundakbaev	(Kazakhstan)	MF	21 March 1994 (aged 18)	Academy	2012	0	0
85	Alibek Anuarbek	(Kazakhstan)	MF	11 April 1995 (aged 17)	Academy	2012	0	0
89	Bauyrzhan Tanirbergenov	(Kazakhstan)	MF	11 February 1995 (aged 17)	Academy	2012	0	0
95	Anuar Jagippar	(Kazakhstan)	MF	2 January 1995 (aged 17)	Academy	2012	0	0
96	Madiyar Raimbek	(Kazakhstan)	MF	15 August 1995 (aged 17)	Academy	2012	0	0
99	Arman Nyusup	(Kazakhstan)	MF	22 January 1994 (aged 18)	Academy	2012	0	0
	Kasymkhan Talasbayev	(Kazakhstan)	MF	27 February 1993 (aged 19)	Tsesna	2012	1	0
	Vladimir Vyatkin	(Kazakhstan)	MF	30 April 1991 (aged 21)	Tsesna	2012	13	1
Forwards
11	Ruslan Mansurov	(Kazakhstan)	FW	23 November 1990 (aged 21)	Sunkar	2010		
37	Kanat Akhmetov	(Kazakhstan)	FW	11 April 1987 (aged 25)	Ak Bulak	2012	6	0
43	Souto	(Spain)	FW	29 April 1983 (aged 29)	loan from Teruel	2012	9	2
44	Óscar	(Spain)	FW	12 July 1988 (aged 24)	San Roque	2012	10	1
46	Georgy Makaev	(Kazakhstan)	FW	12 August 1994 (aged 18)	Tsesna	2012	1	0
57	Magomed Paragulgov	(Kazakhstan)	FW	27 March 1994 (aged 18)	Olé Brasil	2012	0	0
87	Boris Donchenko	(Kazakhstan)	FW	5 June 1995 (aged 17)	Academy	2012	0	0
88	Magamed Uzdenov	(Kazakhstan)	FW	25 February 1994 (aged 18)	Academy	2012	4	0
97	Ilyas Ilahunon	(Kazakhstan)	FW	4 February 1994 (aged 18)	Academy	2012	0	0
	Nikita Utrobin	(Kazakhstan)	FW	3 January 1994 (aged 18)	Tsesna	2012	6	0
Players away on loan
23	Oleg Nedashkovsky	(Kazakhstan)	MF	9 September 1987 (aged 25)	Taraz	2012	9	5
Players that left during the season
5	Burak Akyildiz	(Turkey)	DF	3 January 1985 (aged 27)	Denizlispor	2012	8	0
8	Andrei Kharabara	(Russia)	MF	1 September 1985 (aged 27)	Zhetysu	2012	9	0
9	Nemanja Jovanović	(Serbia)	FW	14 August 1984 (aged 28)	Taraz	2012	16	3
17	Vladimir Yakovlev	(Kazakhstan)	DF	2 August 1984 (aged 28)	Taraz	2012	5	0
19	Azamat Aubakirov	(Kazakhstan)	MF	10 November 1987 (aged 24)	Sunkar	2012	5	0
75	Serik Kalabaev	(Kazakhstan)	FW	7 March 1994 (aged 18)	Academy	2012	0	0
	Almat Abdramanov	(Kazakhstan)	FW	12 March 1990 (aged 22)	CSKA Almaty	2012	5	1

== Transfers ==
=== Winter ===
In: Note: Flags indicate national team as defined under FIFA eligibility rules; some limited exceptions apply. Players may hold more than one non-FIFA nationality.

No.	Pos.	Nation	Player
1	DF	KAZ	Andrei Shabanov (from (Kazakhstan) Atyrau)
5	DF	TUR	Burak Akyildiz (from (Turkey) Denizlispor)
7	MF	KAZ	Ruslan Sakhalbaev (from (Kazakhstan) Aktobe)
8	MF	KAZ	Andrei Kharabara (from (Kazakhstan) Zhetysu)
9	FW	SRB	Nemanja Jovanović (from (Kazakhstan) Taraz)
15	DF	KAZ	Yevgeni Lyovin (from (Kazakhstan) Ordabasy)
16	MF	ESP	Alberto Heredia (from (Spain) Lorca Atlético)
17	DF	KAZ	Vladimir Yakovlev (from (Kazakhstan) Taraz)
18	MF	KAZ	Dmitriy Mamonov
19	MF	KAZ	Azamat Aubakirov (from (Kazakhstan) Irtysh Pavlodar)
20	MF	KAZ	Ilya Kalinin (from (Kazakhstan) Tsesna)
21	MF	SCO	Stuart Duff (from (Malta) Qormi)
23	MF	KAZ	Oleg Nedashkovski (from (Kazakhstan) Taraz)
29	DF	KAZ	Mark Gorman (from (Kazakhstan) Astana)
30	MF	CRO	Josip Knežević (loan from (Russia) Amkar Perm)
31	GK	KAZ	Ildar Shaikheslamov
35	GK	KAZ	Ramil Nurmukhametov (from (Kazakhstan) Taraz)

Out: Note: Flags indicate national team as defined under FIFA eligibility rules; some limited exceptions apply. Players may hold more than one non-FIFA nationality.

No.	Pos.	Nation	Player
1	GK	KAZ	Daniil Rikhard (to (Kazakhstan) Tobol)
5	MF	BLR	Pavel Kirylchyk (to (Belarus) Gomel)
7	FW	KAZ	Artyom Fomin (to (Kazakhstan) Atyrau)
9	FW	KAZ	Murat Suyumagambetov (to (Kazakhstan) Taraz)
11	MF	KAZ	Chingiz Abugaliyev (to (Kazakhstan) Caspiy)
16	DF	KAZ	Yevgeni Goryachi (to (Kazakhstan) Astana)
17	MF	KAZ	Konstantin Golovskoy (to (Kazakhstan) Tobol)
18	FW	BUL	Deyan Hristov (to (Bulgaria) Botev Plovdiv)
21	MF	KAZ	Arman Khalykov (to (Kazakhstan) Sunkar)
23	MF	KAZ	Yevgeny Kostrub (to (Kazakhstan) Akzhayik)
30	GK	KAZ	Andrei Tsvetkov (to (Kazakhstan) Taraz)
44	DF	KAZ	Yevgeni Klimov (to (Kazakhstan) Bayterek)
54	GK	ISR	Yossi Shekel (to (Israel) Maccabi Yavne)
77	MF	CMR	Stéphane Kingue Mpondo (to (Cameroon) Coton Sport)
87	MF	KAZ	Rinat Khasenov
99	MF	GEO	Shevec Movtyanishvili

=== Summer ===
In: Note: Flags indicate national team as defined under FIFA eligibility rules; some limited exceptions apply. Players may hold more than one non-FIFA nationality.

No.	Pos.	Nation	Player
43	FW	ESP	Souto (from (Spain) Teruel)
44	FW	ESP	Óscar (from (Spain) San Roque)
45	DF	BLR	Alyaksandr Bychanok (loan from (Belarus) Dinamo Minsk)

Out: Note: Flags indicate national team as defined under FIFA eligibility rules; some limited exceptions apply. Players may hold more than one non-FIFA nationality.

No.	Pos.	Nation	Player
5	DF	TUR	Burak Akyildiz (to (Turkey) Adana Demirspor)
8	MF	RUS	Andrei Kharabara (to (Kazakhstan) Sunkar)
9	FW	SRB	Nemanja Jovanović (to (Kazakhstan) Tobol)
11	FW	KAZ	Ruslan Mansurov
17	DF	KAZ	Vladimir Yakovlev (to (Kazakhstan) Irtysh Pavlodar)
19	MF	KAZ	Azamat Aubakirov
23	MF	KAZ	Oleg Nedashkovsky (loan to (Kazakhstan) Sunkar)
75	FW	KAZ	Serik Kalabaev
—	FW	KAZ	Almat Abdramanov (to (Kazakhstan) Kairat Academy)

== Competitions ==
=== Kazakhstan Premier League ===
==== Results summary ====
Overall								Home						Away					
Pld	W	D	L	GF	GA	GD	Pts	W	D	L	GF	GA	GD	W	D	L	GF	GA	GD
26	7	8	11	23	34	−11	29	5	4	4	13	14	−1	2	4	7	10	20	−10

Last updated: 2 October 2015.
Source: Soccerway

==== Results by round ====
Round	1	2	3	4	5	6	7	8	9	10	11	12	13	14	15	16	17	18	19	20	21	22	23	24	25	26
Ground	A	H	A	H	A	H	A	H	A	H	A	A	H	A	H	A	H	A	A	H	A	H	H	A	H	H
Result	L	W	L	L	W	D	D	W	L	D	W	L	D	D	D	L	L	D	L	W	D	W	L	L	L	W
Position	14	10	12	11	9	10	9	9	9	9	8	10	10	10	10	10	12	11	11	12	11	11	10	10	10	10

Source: Soccerway
A = Away; H = Home; W = Win; D = Draw; L = Loss

==== Results ====
10 March 2012 1	Tobol	4 – 0	Kairat	Kostanay
15:00 (UTC+6)	Batak (yellow card) 14'; Dzholchiyev 34', 62'; Golovskoy 48' (pen.); Jhonnes 54'	Summary	R.Sakhalbaev (yellow card) 25'	Stadium: Central Stadium; Attendance: 4,000; Referee: Oleg Sokolov

18 March 2012 2	Kairat	3 – 0	Okzhetpes	Almaty
15:00 (UTC+6)	Knežević 22' (pen.) (yellow card) 74'; Jovanović 49'; Đorđević 71'; R.Rozybakiyev (yellow card) 90'	Summary	Bidnenko (yellow card) 23'; A.Mikhaylyuk (yellow card) 90'	Stadium: Central Stadium; Attendance: 6,500; Referee: Aleksei Bobrov

25 March 2012 3	Atyrau	2 – 0	Kairat	Atyrau
15:00 (UTC+6)	N.Saraev 4'; T.Danilyuk (yellow card) 32'; Samchenko (yellow card) 38'; Kutsov (yellow card) 52'; S.Shaff 73' (yellow card) 90'; S.Shalekenov (yellow card) 81'	Summary	Duff (yellow card) 19'; B.Akyildiz (yellow card) 31'; R.Rozybakiyev (yellow card) 59'	Stadium: Munaishy Stadium; Attendance: 1,500; Referee: Viktor Antonov

1 April 2012 4	Kairat	0 – 2	Astana	Almaty
17:00 (UTC+6)	Shestakov (yellow card) 14'; Y.Lyovin (yellow card) 35'	Summary	Konysbayev (yellow card) 41'; Mukhtarov (yellow card) 45+1'; Gridin 63'; Ostapenko 73'	Stadium: Central Stadium; Attendance: 7,000; Referee: Pavel Saliy

8 April 2012 5	Sunkar	0 – 2	Kairat	Almaty
16:30 (UTC+6)	T.Khalmuratov (yellow card) 64'	Summary	Duff 30'; Knežević (yellow card) 75' (goal) 85'	Stadium: Stadion KazEU im. T. Ryskulova; Attendance: 3,000; Referee: Aydin Rakhimbayev

15 April 2012 6	Kairat	1 – 1	Kaisar	Almaty
15:00 (UTC+6)	Knežević (yellow card) 9' (goal) 27' (pen.); O.Nedashkovski (yellow card) 57'; Heredia (yellow card) 79'	Summary	Sytnik (yellow card) 12'; Vagner 59'; Džodžo (yellow card) 90+2'	Stadium: Central Stadium; Attendance: 7,500; Referee: Anatolyi Vishnichenko

22 April 2012 7	Aktobe	1 – 1	Kairat	Aktobe
19:00 (UTC+6)	Maletić (yellow card) 61' (yellow-red card) 73'; Khairullin 69' (pen.); Vukajlović (yellow card) 90'	Summary	B.Akyildiz (yellow card) 18'; Mamonov 35'; Đorđević (yellow card) 68'; Kharabara (yellow card) 69'; Jovanović (yellow card) 87'; Heredia (yellow card) 88'	Stadium: Central Stadium; Attendance: 3,000; Referee: Oleg Sokolov

29 April 2012 8	Kairat	1 – 0	Zhetysu	Almaty
17:00 (UTC+6)	O.Nedashkovski 76'	Summary	Mukanov (yellow card) 30'; Đalović (yellow card) 65'; S.Sariyev (yellow card) 79'	Stadium: Central Stadium; Attendance: 5,000; Referee: Akmalkhan Kholmatov

6 May 2012 9	Taraz	2 – 1	Kairat	Taraz
17:30 (UTC+6)	Perić 16'; A.Tsvetkov (yellow card) 51' (goal) 51'	Summary	O.Nedashkovski (yellow card) 39'; Gorman (yellow card) 45+1'; Knežević 87'	Stadium: Central Stadium; Attendance: 5,500; Referee: Artyom Kuchin

12 May 2012 10	Kairat	1 – 1	Ordabasy	Almaty
17:00 (UTC+6)	Shestakov (yellow card) 34'; Y.Lyovin (yellow card) 66'; Knežević 68'	Summary	Mwesigwa (yellow card) 18'; Gorman 45' (o.g.); Irismetov (yellow card) 75'; R.Pakholyuk (yellow card) 79'	Stadium: Central Stadium; Attendance: 9,000; Referee: Aleksandr Gauzer

20 May 2012 11	Akzhayik	1 – 2	Kairat	Oral
20:00 (UTC+6)	Sadjo 60'; V.Erbes (yellow card) 70'; B.Omarov (yellow card) 82'	Summary	Knežević (yellow card) 67'; O.Nedashkovski 85'; Jovanović 86'; Kharabara (yellow card) 90'	Stadium: Petr Atoyan Stadium; Attendance: 6,000; Referee: Igor Khisamutdinov

27 May 2012 12	Shakhter Karagandy	4 – 1	Kairat	Karagandy
17:00 (UTC+6)	Khizhnichenko 1'; Finonchenko 38', 45+1'; Lunin 47'	Summary	O.Nedashkovski 9' (yellow card) 62'; Shestakov (yellow card) 44'; R.Rozybakiyev (yellow card) 82'	Stadium: Shakhter Stadium; Attendance: 6,000; Referee: Pavel Saliy

16 June 2012 13	Kairat	0 – 0	Irtysh Pavlodar	Almaty
17:00 (UTC+6)	Shestakov (yellow card) 54'	Summary	Chernyshov (yellow card) 69'; Coulibaly (yellow card) 75'	Stadium: Central Stadium; Attendance: 7,500; Referee: Aleksei Bobrov

24 June 2012 14	Okzhetpes	0 – 0	Kairat	Kokshetau
17:00 (UTC+6)		Summary	Đorđević (yellow card) 22'; A.Abdramanov (yellow card) 22'; K.Talasbayev (yellow card) 77'	Stadium: Okzhetpes Stadium; Attendance: 1,500; Referee: Aleksandr Gauzer

1 July 2012 15	Kairat	1 – 1	Atyrau	Almaty
19:30 (UTC+6)	Đorđević 12'; K.Akhmetov (yellow card) 64'	Summary	Sigurðsson 66'; Kutsov (yellow card) 85'; Milanković (yellow card) 87'	Stadium: Central Stadium; Attendance: 6,500; Referee: Bolat Karlibayev

8 July 2012 16	Astana	2 – 1	Kairat	Astana
17:00 (UTC+6)	Nusserbayev 53'; Ostapenko 61' (pen.)	Summary	R.Nurmukhametov (yellow card) 60'; A.Abdramanov 72'; Gorman (yellow card) 76'; Shestakov (yellow card) 88'	Stadium: Astana Arena; Attendance: 3,000; Referee: Igor Khisamutdinov

15 July 2012 17	Kairat	1 – 3	Sunkar	Almaty
19:00 (UTC+6)	Souto 4'; Đorđević (red card) 58'; Duff (yellow card) 61'	Summary	Đokić 36'; Savėnas 59' (pen.); A.Serikzhanov (yellow card) 60'; O.Nedashkovski 77'	Stadium: Central Stadium; Attendance: 5,000; Referee: Pavel Saliy

29 July 2012 18	Kaisar	1 – 1	Kairat	Kyzylorda
19:00 (UTC+6)	Z.Moldakaraev 77'	Summary	V.Vyatkin (yellow card) 27'; I.Kalinin 47'; Gorman (yellow card) 52'; R.Nurmukhametov (yellow card) 76'; R.Sakhalbaev (yellow card) 90+3'	Stadium: Gani Muratbayev Stadium; Attendance: 4,000; Referee: Askhat Abdanbayev

19 August 2012 20	Zhetysu	2 – 1	Kairat	Taldykorgan
18:00 (UTC+6)	Junuzović 37'; Mihajlov (yellow card) 56'; Dobrašinović 65'	Summary	I.Kalinin 58'; Bychanok (yellow card) 78' (yellow-red card) 85'	Stadium: Zhetysu Stadium; Attendance: 1,500; Referee: Viktor Antonov

26 August 2012 21	Kairat	2 – 1	Taraz	Almaty
19:00 (UTC+6)	Shestakov (yellow card) 19'; Souto (yellow card) 21' (goal) 61'; R.Rozybakiyev (yellow card) 30'; Knežević 46' (pen.); Óscar (yellow card) 57'; A.Shabanov (yellow card) 90+3'	Summary	Kuchma 29' (yellow card) 46'; M.Muminov (yellow card) 57'	Stadium: Central Stadium; Attendance: 6,000; Referee: Marat Iskakov

15 September 2012 22	Ordabasy	0 – 0	Kairat	Shymkent
17:00 (UTC+6)	B.Kozhabayev (yellow card) 63'; B.Beyssenov (yellow card) 90+3'	Summary	I.Vorotnikov (yellow card) 52'; Gorman (yellow card) 62'; Souto (yellow card) 78'	Stadium: Kazhymukan Munaitpasov Stadium; Attendance: 4,500; Referee: Igor Aleshin

23 September 2012 23	Kairat	2 – 1	Akzhayik	Almaty
15:00 (UTC+6)	Óscar 9'; R.Sakhalbaev 41'; V.Vyatkin (yellow card) 69'; Heredia (yellow card) 90'	Summary	B.Omarov (yellow card) 38'; Zyankovich 61'; E.Kostrub (yellow card) 76'	Stadium: Central Stadium; Attendance: 5,000; Referee: Igor Khisamutdinov

4 October 2012 24	Kairat	0 – 1	Shakhter Karagandy	Almaty
18:00 (UTC+6)	Souto (yellow card) 1'	Summary	Vasiljević (yellow card) 33' (goal) 63'; Paryvayew (yellow card) 85'; Gridin (yellow card) 90+2'	Stadium: Central Stadium; Attendance: 7,000; Referee: Ruslan Duzmambetov

21 October 2012 25	Irtysh Pavlodar	1 – 0	Kairat	Pavlodar
15:00 (UTC+6)	Chernyshov (yellow card) 46'; Bakayev 51'; Shomko (yellow card) 53'; V.Kotlyar (yellow card) 90+1'	Summary	Shestakov (yellow card) 29'; Bychanok (yellow card) 41'	Stadium: Central Stadium; Attendance: 3,000; Referee: Bolat Karlibayev

24 October 2012 19	Kairat	0 – 3	Aktobe	Almaty
19:00 (UTC+6)	Duff (yellow card) 45'	Summary	Bajer 38', 89'; Geynrikh (yellow card) 48'; Khairullin 85' (yellow card) 85'	Stadium: Central Stadium; Attendance: 6,500; Referee: Aleksei Bobrov

28 October 2012 26	Kairat	1 – 0	Tobol	Almaty
18:00 (UTC+6)	V.Vyatkin 19'	Summary	Kislitsyn (yellow card) 38'; Jovanović (yellow card) 49'	Stadium: Central Stadium; Attendance: 7,000; Referee: Ruslan Duzmambetov

==== League table ====
Pos	Team	Pld	W	D	L	GF	GA	GD	Pts
8	Akzhayik	26	10	4	12	34	39	−5	34
9	Kaisar	26	8	6	12	21	33	−12	30
10	Kairat	26	7	8	11	23	34	−11	29
11	Atyrau	26	7	6	13	16	32	−16	27
12	Zhetysu	26	6	5	15	27	45	−18	23

Source: FFK (in Russian)
Rules for classification: 1st points;
Two team tiebreak: 1st overall wins; 2nd head-to-head record; 3rd goals difference; 4th goals scored; 5th away goals scored;
Multiple teams tiebreak: 1st overall wins; 2nd goals difference; 3rd goals scored; 4th away goals scored

=== Kazakhstan Cup ===
16 May 2012 First Round	Kyran	2 – 4	Kairat	Shymkent
17:00 (UTC+6)	V.Prosekov 20'; Kozyulin (yellow card) 51'; S.Zhumahanov 75'	Report	O.Nedashkovski 40', 74' (yellow card) 62'; Jovanović 56'; Knežević 90+1'	Stadium: Lokomotive Stadium; Attendance: 200; Referee: Abdullaev

20 June 2012 Second Round 1st leg	Kaisar	2 – 0	Kairat	Kyzylorda
19:00 (UTC+6)	Parkhachev 63'; Z.Moldakaraev 75'	Summary	K.Akhmetov (yellow card) 60'	Stadium: Gani Muratbayev Stadium; Attendance: 3,500; Referee: Anatolyi Vishnichenko

27 June 2012 Second Round 2nd leg	Kairat	1 – 0 (1 – 2 agg.)	Kaisar	Almaty
19:00 (UTC+6)	R.Rozybakiyev 32' (yellow card) 47'; Y.Lyovin (yellow card) 45'	Summary	S.Sagyndykov (yellow card) 45'; A.Tagybergen (yellow card) 64'	Stadium: Central Stadium; Attendance: 6,000; Referee: Artyom Kuchin

== Squad statistics ==
As of Match played 28 October 2012

=== Appearances and goals ===
No.	Pos	Nat	Player	Total		Premier League		Kazakhstan Cup	
No.	Pos	Nat	Player	Apps	Goals	Apps	Goals	Apps	Goals
1	GK	(Kazakhstan) KAZ	Andrei Shabanov	10	0	7	0	3	0
4	DF	(Kazakhstan) KAZ	Ilya Vorotnikov	18	0	16	0	2	0
6	MF	(Kazakhstan) KAZ	Rakhimzhan Rozybakiyev	19	1	11+6	0	1+1	1
7	MF	(Kazakhstan) KAZ	Ruslan Sakhalbaev	18	1	6+10	1	2	0
10	MF	(Kazakhstan) KAZ	Ruslan Baltiev	4	0	0+3	0	1	0
14	DF	(Kazakhstan) KAZ	Nursayn Zholdasov	3	0	1+1	0	1	0
15	DF	(Kazakhstan) KAZ	Evgeni Levin	18	0	12+3	0	1+2	0
16	MF	(Spain) ESP	Alberto Heredia	20	0	11+7	0	2	0
18	MF	(Kazakhstan) KAZ	Dmitriy Mamonov	15	1	12+2	1	0+1	0
20	MF	(Kazakhstan) KAZ	Ilya Kalinin	21	2	10+9	2	2	0
21	MF	(Scotland) SCO	Stuart Duff	26	1	23+1	1	2	0
22	MF	(Kazakhstan) KAZ	Kirill Shestakov	24	0	22	0	2	0
27	DF	(Serbia) SRB	Marko Đorđević	22	2	19+1	2	2	0
29	DF	(Kazakhstan) KAZ	Mark Gorman	28	0	24+1	0	3	0
30	MF	(Croatia) CRO	Josip Knežević	17	7	14+2	6	1	1
31	GK	(Kazakhstan) KAZ	Ildar Shaikheslamov	1	0	0+1	0	0	0
32	MF	(Kazakhstan) KAZ	Nurzharyk Kunov	1	0	0	0	1	0
35	GK	(Kazakhstan) KAZ	Ramil Nurmukhametov	19	0	19	0	0	0
37	FW	(Kazakhstan) KAZ	Kanat Akhmetov	6	0	2+3	0	1	0
43	FW	(Spain) ESP	Souto	9	2	9	2	0	0
44	FW	(Spain) ESP	Óscar	10	1	9+1	1	0	0
45	DF	(Belarus) BLR	Alyaksandr Bychanok	7	0	2+5	0	0	0
46	FW	(Kazakhstan) KAZ	Georgiy Makayev	1	0	0	0	0+1	0
47	DF	(Kazakhstan) KAZ	Sergey Keyler	1	0	0	0	1	0
88	FW	(Kazakhstan) KAZ	Magomed Uzdenov	4	0	1+2	0	1	0
89	MF	(Kazakhstan) KAZ	Bauyrzhan Tanibergenov	1	0	0	0	0+1	0
	MF	(Kazakhstan) KAZ	Kassymkhan Talasbayev	1	0	0+1	0	0	0
	MF	(Kazakhstan) KAZ	Vladimir Vyatkin	13	1	11+2	1	0	0
	FW	(Kazakhstan) KAZ	Almat Abdramanov	5	1	2+3	1	0	0
	FW	(Kazakhstan) KAZ	Nikita Utrobin	6	0	2+4	0	0	0
Players away from Kairat on loan:
23	MF	(Kazakhstan) KAZ	Oleg Nedashkovsky	9	5	6+2	3	1	2
Players who appeared for Kairat that left during the season:
5	DF	(Turkey) TUR	Burak Akyildiz	8	0	8	0	0	0
8	MF	(Russia) RUS	Andrei Kharabara	9	0	9	0	0	0
9	FW	(Serbia) SRB	Nemanja Jovanović	16	3	13+1	2	1+1	1
11	MF	(Kazakhstan) KAZ	Ruslan Mansurov	1	0	0+1	0	0	0
17	MF	(Kazakhstan) KAZ	Vladimir Yakovlev	5	0	3+1	0	1	0
19	MF	(Kazakhstan) KAZ	Azamat Aubakirov	5	0	2+2	0	1	0

=== Goal scorers ===
Place	Position	Nation	Number	Name	Premier League	Kazakhstan Cup	Total
1	MF	(Croatia)	30	Josip Knežević	6	1	7
2	MF	(Kazakhstan)	23	Oleg Nedashkovski	3	2	5
3	FW	(Serbia)	9	Nemanja Jovanović	2	1	3
4	DF	(Serbia)	27	Marko Đorđević	2	0	2
4	MF	(Kazakhstan)	20	Ilya Kalinin	2	0	2
4	FW	(Spain)	43	Souto	2	0	2
7	FW	(Kazakhstan)		Vladimir Vyatkin	1	0	1
7	FW	(Kazakhstan)		Almat Abdramanov	1	0	1
7	MF	(Scotland)	21	Stuart Duff	1	0	1
7	MF	(Kazakhstan)	18	Dmitriy Mamonov	1	0	1
7	FW	(Spain)	44	Óscar	1	0	1
7	MF	(Kazakhstan)	7	Ruslan Sakhalbaev	1	0	1
7	MF	(Kazakhstan)	6	Rakhimzhan Rozybakiyev	0	1	1
				TOTALS	23	5	28

=== Disciplinary record ===
Number	Nation	Position	Name	Premier League		Kazakhstan Cup		Total	
Number	Nation	Position	Name	Yellow card	Red card	Yellow card	Red card	Yellow card	Red card
1	(Kazakhstan)	GK	Andrei Shabanov	1	0	0	0	1	0
4	(Kazakhstan)	DF	Ilya Vorotnikov	1	0	0	0	1	0
5	(Turkey)	DF	Burak Akyildiz	2	0	0	0	2	0
6	(Kazakhstan)	MF	Rakhimzhan Rozybakiyev	4	0	1	0	5	0
7	(Kazakhstan)	MF	Ruslan Sakhalbaev	2	0	0	0	2	0
8	(Kazakhstan)	MF	Andrei Kharabara	2	0	0	0	2	0
9	(Serbia)	FW	Nemanja Jovanović	1	0	0	0	1	0
15	(Kazakhstan)	MF	Evgeni Levin	2	0	1	0	3	0
16	(Spain)	MF	Alberto Heredia	3	0	0	0	3	0
21	(Scotland)	MF	Stuart Duff	3	0	0	0	3	0
22	(Kazakhstan)	MF	Kirill Shestakov	7	0	0	0	7	0
23	(Kazakhstan)	MF	Oleg Nedashkovski	3	0	1	0	4	0
27	(Serbia)	DF	Marko Đorđević	2	1	0	0	2	1
29	(Kazakhstan)	DF	Mark Gorman	4	0	0	0	4	0
30	(Croatia)	MF	Josip Knežević	4	0	0	0	4	0
35	(Kazakhstan)	GK	Ramil Nurmukhametov	2	0	0	0	2	0
37	(Kazakhstan)	FW	Kanat Akhmetov	1	0	1	0	2	0
43	(Spain)	FW	Souto	3	0	0	0	3	0
44	(Spain)	FW	Óscar	1	0	0	0	1	0
45	(Belarus)	DF	Alyaksandr Bychanok	3	1	0	0	3	1
	(Kazakhstan)	MF	Kassymkhan Talasbayev	1	0	0	0	1	0
	(Kazakhstan)	MF	Vladimir Vyatkin	2	0	0	0	2	0
	(Kazakhstan)	FW	Almat Abdramanov	2	0	0	0	2	0
			TOTALS	56	2	4	0	60	2
