= 2005–06 Dundee United F.C. season =

Dundee United
2005–06 season
- Chairman: Eddie Thompson
- Manager: Gordon Chisholm (until 10 January); Billy Dodds (Interim); Craig Brewster (from 16 January)
- Stadium: Tannadice Park
- SPL: Ninth place
- Scottish Cup: Third round
- League Cup: Third round
- UEFA Cup: Second qualifying round
- Top goalscorer: League: Lee Miller (8); All: Lee Miller & Collin Samuel (8)
- Highest home attendance: 12,404 vs. Aberdeen, SPL, 30 July 2005
- Lowest home attendance: 5,034 vs. Dunfermline Athletic, SPL, 2 May 2006
Home colours	Away colours

The 2005–06 season was the 97th year of football played by Dundee United, and covers the period from 1 July 2005 to 30 June 2006. United finished in ninth place for the second consecutive season and meant they had only finished in the top six once in the six seasons since the split was introduced.

United finished the 2005/06 SPL season in ninth place with 33 points, narrowly beating Falkirk (10th) and Dunfermline Athletic (11th) on goal difference. United exited all three cup competitions at the first stage. Between April and early-May, United lost six consecutive games, including losses to the three clubs which finished below them in the league.

The much-anticipated UEFA Cup campaign ended in disappointment with an away-goals defeat to Finnish side MyPa (after United surrendered a two-goal lead), and a Scottish League Cup defeat to Inverness CT followed, although an incredible 5–4 away win over Motherwell brought some early-season cheer. United also exited the Scottish Cup at the first hurdle, bowing out 3–2 to Aberdeen after again throwing away a two-goal lead.

Little league success followed, and the Terrors finished ninth on goal difference, thanks to a late Collin Samuel equaliser against Motherwell on the season's final day. In mid-January, Gordon Chisholm was sacked, with United favourite Craig Brewster leaving Inverness CT to take over. Brewster would go on to win just one league game all season and leave United before 2006 was out.

== Summary ==
Dundee United played a total of 42 competitive matches during the 2005–06 season, as well as four pre-season friendlies, making a total of nearly fifty games played. The team finished ninth in the Scottish Premier League.

In the cup competitions, United were knocked out of the Scottish Cup at the third round stage, losing 3–2 at home to Aberdeen, despite being two goals ahead at half time. The club also exited early in the League Cup, losing 2–0 away to Inverness CT in the third round. United fell to an early exit in the UEFA Cup after losing on away goals to Finnish team MyPa, completing an immediate exit in all three cup competitions.

The club signed six players during the season, as well as loaning one for the latter part. Only one player – Lee Miller – was signed for a fee of £225k. Six players left the club during the season with only one transfer involving a fee: Mark Wilson's £500k move to Celtic. The others were released before the end of their contracts.

Charlie Mulgrew would pick up the young player of the month award for February 2006.

The club's home strip remained unchanged from the previous season but the away kit was changed to a new white and black outfit, separated diagonally. As mentioned at the end of the previous season, the limited edition third kit would be used for the European campaign. The jerseys were sponsored by Morning, Noon and Night for the third and final season. Originally sponsored for the 2003–04 season, the firm – operating under the banner of Scotmid since August 2004 – sponsored the club for a final time. The sponsor logo was again displayed as a simple font across the chest, with white logo for the home and third tops and orange logo on the change strip.

== Season review ==
Pre-season preparations went well, with United winning the inaugural City of Discovery Cup. The league season started disappointingly, however, with the surprise UEFA Cup exit in August to MyPa a notable downpoint. After drawing the away leg 0–0, United threw away a 2–0 first-half home lead, and went out on away goals. An incredible 5–4 win at Motherwell – in which United were two goals behind on three occasions – was the only high point in a disappointing month. United also lost to Celtic and Hearts in August.

United lost at Hibernian and exited the Scottish League Cup in September, going out to Inverness Caledonian Thistle in the third round. Prior to the cup exit, a 2–0 win over Livingston had brought the first home win. Immediately after going out of the cup, United lost at Dunfermline, to close out September in disappointing fashion.

In October, United a three-game unbeaten run, indicating a small improvement. The spell – which included a televised draw against Rangers and a win at Falkirk – was unfortunately followed by three successive defeats, which saw nine goals conceded. United then avoided defeat in four of the next five matches.

Boxing Day saw a last-minute defeat at Kilmarnock and United also lost heavily at Ibrox to Rangers. Incredibly, United exited the third cup tournament immediately, throwing away a two-goal home lead to lose 3–2 to Aberdeen. In the game in which on-loan Charles Mulgrew debuted, David Fernández scored twice in the first half, only for ex-Tangerine Stevie Crawford to equalise. It proved to be the final straw and manager Gordon Chisholm left, with immediate rumours naming Craig Brewster as Eddie Thompson's man of choice for the hot seat. Brewster was appointed shortly after.

Caretaker-manager Billy Dodds took charge for his only game as United recovered to beat Falkirk 2–1, with newly appointed Brewster watching from the stands. It would also be Mark Wilson's final match, as he moved to Celtic for £500,000 shortly afterwards.

Brewster made his second United debut against Aberdeen but lasted under half an hour due to injury, which ended his playing season. He guided United to three draws in his first three matches but had to wait until his eighth match to secure his first win, at the expense of Livingston. During this time, on-loan Charlie Mulgrew won the Young Player of the Month award for February. United lost six of the final eight games to end a thoroughly disappointing season, which brought just one league win for the new manager.

== Fixtures and results ==
All results are written with Dundee United's score first.

=== Scottish Premier League ===
Date	Opponent	Venue	Result	Attendance	Scorers
30 July 2005	Aberdeen	H	1–1	12,404	Miller
6 August 2005	Celtic	A	0–2	56,532	
14 August 2005	Heart of Midlothian	H	0–3	11,654	
20 August 2005	Motherwell	A	5–4	4,706	Miller (2), Fernández, Brebner (2)
28 August 2005	Inverness CT	H	1–1	6,178	Miller
10 September 2005	Hibernian	A	1–2	12,062	Brebner
17 September 2005	Livingston	H	2–0	6,302	Fernández, Canero
24 September 2005	Dunfermline Athletic	A	1–2	5,361	McCracken
1 October 2005	Kilmarnock	H	0–0	6,915	
16 October 2005	Rangers	H	0–0	11,696	
22 October 2005	Falkirk	A	3–1	5,316	OG, Canero, Samuel
25 October 2005	Aberdeen	A	0–2	10,720	
30 October 2005	Celtic	H	2–4	11,942	OG, Samuel
5 November 2005	Heart of Midlothian	A	0–3	16,617	
19 November 2005	Motherwell	H	1–1	6,305	McIntyre
26 November 2005	Inverness CT	A	1–1	3,239	Miller
3 December 2005	Hibernian	H	1–0	7,976	Samuel
10 December 2005	Livingston	A	0–1	3,845	
20 December 2005	Dunfermline Athletic	H	2–1	5,889	Samuel, Robson
26 December 2005	Kilmarnock	A	1–2	5,749	Samuel
31 December 2005	Rangers	A	0–3	49,141	
15 January 2006	Falkirk	H	2–1	7,948	Fernández, McInnes
21 January 2006	Aberdeen	H	1–1	9,936	Archibald
28 January 2006	Celtic	A	3–3	59,875	Fernández (2), Miller
7 February 2006	Heart of Midlothian	H	1–1	10,584	Brebner
11 February 2006	Motherwell	A	0–2	5,257	
18 February 2006	Inverness CT	H	2–4	6,419	Mulgrew
25 February 2006	Dunfermline Athletic	A	1–1	4,694	Kenneth
4 March 2006	Hibernian	A	1–3	16,266	Goodwillie
11 March 2006	Livingston	H	3–1	5,730	Miller (2), Kerr
25 March 2006	Kilmarnock	H	2–2	5,830	McCracken, McInnes
2 April 2006	Rangers	H	1–4	11,213	Samuel
8 April 2006	Falkirk	A	0–1	4,473	
15 April 2006	Livingston	A	1–3	2,298	Robertson
22 April 2006	Inverness CT	A	0–1	3,609	
29 April 2006	Falkirk	H	0–2	5,798	
2 May 2006	Dunfermline Athletic	H	0–1	5,034	
6 May 2006	Motherwell	A	1–1	5,269	Samuel

=== Scottish Cup ===
Date	Opponent	Opponent	Venue	Result	Attendance	Scorers
7 January 2006	Third round	Aberdeen	H	2–3	8,218	Fernández (2)

=== Scottish League Cup ===
Date	Round	Opponent	Venue	Result	Attendance	Scorers
20 September 2005	Third round	Inverness CT	A	0–2	1,919	

=== UEFA Cup ===
Date	Round	Opponent	Venue	Result	Attendance	Scorers
11 August 2005	Second qualifying round 1st leg	(Finland) MyPa	A	0–0	1,820	
25 August 2005	Second qualifying round 2nd leg	(Finland) MyPa	H	2–2	9,600	Kerr, Samuel

== Player statistics ==
During the 2005–06 season, United used 27 different players, with a further seven named as unused substitutes. The table below shows the number of appearances and goals scored by each player.

No.	Pos	Nat	Player	Total		SPL		Scottish Cup		League Cup		UEFA Cup	
No.	Pos	Nat	Player	Apps	Goals	Apps	Goals	Apps	Goals	Apps	Goals	Apps	Goals
1	GK	(Scotland) SCO	Derek Stillie	34	0	30	0	1	0	1	0	2	0
2	DF	(Scotland) SCO	Mark Wilson	25	0	21	0	1	0	1	0	2	0
3	DF	(Scotland) SCO	David McCracken	37	2	34	2	1	0	1	0	1	0
4	MF	(Scotland) SCO	Derek McInnes	13	2	12	2	0	0	1	0	0	0
5	MF	(Scotland) SCO	Alan Archibald	38	1	34	1	2	0	2	0	0	0
6	MF	(Scotland) SCO	Peter Canero	12	2	11	2	0	0	1	0	0	0
6	DF	(Scotland) SCO	Charlie Mulgrew	14	2	13	2	1	0	0	0	0	0
7	MF	(Scotland) SCO	Mark Kerr	38	2	35	1	1	0	0	0	2	1
8	MF	(Scotland) SCO	Grant Brebner	29	4	26	4	0	0	1	0	2	0
9	FW	(Scotland) SCO	Lee Miller	38	8	34	8	1	0	1	0	2	0
10	FW	(Scotland) SCO	Jim McIntyre	29	1	25	1	1	0	1	0	2	0
11	MF	(Scotland) SCO	Barry Robson	35	1	31	1	1	0	1	0	2	0
12	MF	(Scotland) SCO	Stuart Duff	33	0	29	0	1	0	1	0	2	0
15	DF	(Scotland) SCO	Lee Mair	6	0	6	0	0	0	0	0	0	0
16	FW	(Scotland) SCO	Craig Brewster	1	0	1	0	0	0	0	0	0	0
17	GK	(Scotland) SCO	Craig Samson	8	0	8	0	0	0	0	0	0	0
18	DF	(Scotland) SCO	Garry Kenneth	16	1	16	1	0	0	0	0	0	0
19	FW	(Scotland) SCO	Stevie Crawford	5	0	4	0	0	0	0	0	1	0
20	FW	(Spain) ESP	David Fernández	32	7	30	5	1	2	1	0	0	0
20	FW	(Trinidad and Tobago) TTO	Collin Samuel	38	8	35	7	1	0	1	0	1	1
23	DF	(Scotland) SCO	Paul Ritchie	23	0	21	0	0	0	1	0	1	0
25	MF	(Scotland) SCO	David Robertson	11	1	11	1	0	0	0	0	0	0
26	MF	(Scotland) SCO	Greg Cameron	4	0	4	0	0	0	0	0	0	0
28	DF	(Scotland) SCO	Ross Gardiner	4	0	4	0	0	0	0	0	0	0
29	DF	(Scotland) SCO	Stuart Abbot	3	0	3	0	0	0	0	0	0	0
30	MF	(Scotland) SCO	William Easton	1	0	1	0	0	0	0	0	0	0
36	FW	(Scotland) SCO	David Goodwillie	10	1	10	1	0	0	0	0	0	0

=== Goalscorers ===
United had 15 players score with the team scoring 45 goals in total. The top goalscorers were Lee Miller and Collin Samuel, who finished the season with eight goals each.

Name	League	Cups	Total
Lee Miller	8		8
Collin Samuel	7	1	8
David Fernández	5	2	7
Grant Brebner	4		4
Peter Canero	2		2
Mark Kerr	1	1	2
David McCracken	2		2
Derek McInnes	2		2
Charlie Mulgrew	2		2
Alan Archibald	1		1
David Goodwillie	1		1
Garry Kenneth	1		1
Jim McIntyre	1		1
David Robertson	1		1
Barry Robson	1		1

=== Discipline ===
During the 2005–06 season, two United players were sent off, and 18 players received at least one yellow card. In total, the team received two dismissals and 64 cautions.

Name	Cautions	Dismissals
Barry Robson	(yellow card) 10	(red card) 1
Paul Ritchie	(yellow card) 4	(red card) 1
Mark Kerr	(yellow card) 9	
David McCracken	(yellow card) 7	
Grant Brebner	(yellow card) 6	
Alan Archibald	(yellow card) 5	
Stuart Duff	(yellow card) 5	
Lee Miller	(yellow card) 4	
David Fernández	(yellow card) 3	
Jim McIntyre	(yellow card) 3	
Peter Canero	(yellow card) 1	
Stevie Crawford	(yellow card) 1	
Lee Mair	(yellow card) 1	
Charles Mulgrew	(yellow card) 1	
David Robertson	(yellow card) 1	
Collin Samuel	(yellow card) 1	
Derek Stillie	(yellow card) 1	
Mark Wilson	(yellow card) 1	

== Competitions ==
=== League table ===
Pos	Team	Pld	W	D	L	GF	GA	GD	Pts	Qualification or relegation (Note: Teams played each other three times (33 matches), before the league split into two groups (the top six and the bottom six) for the last five matches.)
7	Inverness Caledonian Thistle	38	15	13	10	51	38	+13	58	
8	Motherwell	38	13	10	15	55	61	−6	49	
9	Dundee United	38	7	12	19	41	66	−25	33	
10	Falkirk	38	8	9	21	35	64	−29	33	
11	Dunfermline Athletic	38	8	9	21	33	68	−35	33	

Source: Scottish Professional Football League
Rules for classification: 1) Points; 2) Goal difference; 3) Goals scored

== Transfers ==
=== In ===
Date	Player	From	Fee
3 June 2005	(Scotland) Lee Miller	(England) Bristol City	£225,000
7 July 2005	(Scotland) Derek Stillie	(Scotland) Dunfermline Athletic	Undisclosed
29 July 2005	(Scotland) Craig Samson	(Scotland) Kilmarnock	Free
12 August 2005	(Spain) David Fernández	(Scotland) Celtic	Free
5 September 2005	(Scotland) Peter Canero	(England) Leicester City	Free
16 January 2006	(Scotland) Craig Brewster	(Scotland) Inverness CT	Free

=== Out ===
Date	Player	To	Fee
1 August 2005	(Scotland) James Grady	(Scotland) Gretna	Free
1 August 2005	(Trinidad and Tobago) Jason Scotland	(Scotland) St Johnstone	Free / Work permit expiry
31 August 2005	(Scotland) Stevie Crawford	(Scotland) Aberdeen	Free
31 August 2005	(Scotland) Graeme Holmes	(Scotland) Airdrie United	Free
16 January 2006	(Scotland) Billy Dodds	(Scotland) Partick Thistle	Free
16 January 2006	(Scotland) Mark Wilson	(Scotland) Celtic	£500,000

=== Loans in ===
Date	Player	From	Until
5 January 2006	(Scotland) Charlie Mulgrew	(Scotland) Celtic	End of season
