= Alberto Heredia =

Alberto Heredia may refer to:

- Alberto Heredia (footballer)
- Alberto Heredia (sculptor)
