= Evening Telegraph Challenge Cup =

The Evening Telegraph Challenge Cup (initially known as the City of Discovery Cup) was a pre-season football played in 2005 and 2006, based in Dundee, involving the two Dundee clubs - Dundee and Dundee United.

== Format ==
The 2006 format was a single match between the two Dundee clubs, although the inaugural competition (2005) was a standard four-team knock-out competition.

== History ==
The Cup's inaugural showing was a standard four-team cup format, which saw Dundee United beat Sheffield Wednesday 2–1 in the final. United beat rivals Dundee in the first semi-final, while Sheffield Wednesday saw off Wolverhampton Wanderers on penalties in the other.

On 29 March 2006, it was announced the 2006 tournament would be slimmed down to a single derby match between Dundee and Dundee United. On 22 June 2006, sponsorship was announced for the competition, which would see it renamed the Evening Telegraph Challenge Cup; Radio Tay would also sponsor the event. The match was preceded by celebrity and fans matches.

In 2007, the tournament was to be scheduled for an international weekend during the season, as Dundee United played Barcelona and did not wish to play a pre-season derby so close after that match. However, the season passed without the match being played. The fixture was not announced for the following season either and has not been contested since.

== Past tournaments/winners ==
=== 2005 ===
Semi-finals

23 July
13:00

Sheffield Wednesday (England)	0 – 0 (a.e.t.)	(England) Wolverhampton Wanderers
	Report

Tannadice Park, Dundee
Attendance: 6,659

23 July
16:00

Dundee United (Scotland)	3 – 0	(Scotland) Dundee
Kerr 43'; Duff 50'; Miller 51'	Report

Tannadice Park, Dundee
Attendance: 6,659
Referee: K Toner

3rd place play-off

24 July
13:00

Dundee (Scotland)	0 – 4	(England) Wolverhampton Wanderers
	Report	Cort 57' 75' 85'; Edwards 80'

Dens Park, Dundee

Final

24 July
16:00

Sheffield Wednesday (England)	1 – 2	(Scotland) Dundee United
	Report

Dens Park, Dundee
Attendance: 5,081

=== 2006 ===
Final

22 July
15:15

Dundee (Scotland)	1 – 0	(Scotland) Dundee United
Deasley 61'	Report

Dens Park, Dundee
Attendance: 6,277
Referee: M Ritchie

== Winners ==
1

- (Scotland) Dundee
- (Scotland) Dundee United

== Top goalscorers ==
Player	Club	Goal	Year
(England) Carl Cort	Wolverhampton Wanderers	3	2005
(Scotland) Bryan Deasley	Dundee	1	2006
(Scotland) Stuart Duff	Dundee United	1	2005
(Wales) Rob Edwards	Wolverhampton Wanderers	1	2005
(Scotland) James Grady	Dundee United	1	2005
(Scotland) Garry Kenneth	Dundee United	1	2005
(Scotland) Mark Kerr	Dundee United	1	2005
(Scotland) Lee Miller	Dundee United	1	2005
(Scotland) Lee Peacock	Sheffield Wednesday	1	2005

== Trivia ==
- Both finals were held at Dens Park.
