= Mark Kerr (footballer) =

Scottish footballer

Personal information
- Date of birth: 2 March 1982 (age 44)
- Place of birth: Coatbridge, Scotland
- Position: Midfielder

Youth career
- Moodiesburn Boys Club

Senior career*
Years	Team	Apps	(Gls)
1998–2003	Falkirk	107	(8)
2003–2008	Dundee United	164	(2)
2008–2010	Aberdeen	69	(1)
2010–2011	Asteras Tripolis	11	(0)
2012	Dunfermline Athletic	13	(0)
2012–2013	Dundee	8	(0)
2013–2014	Partick Thistle	0	(0)
2014	Queen of the South	23	(1)
2015–2018	Falkirk	98	(2)
2018–2021	Ayr United	41	(0)

International career
2001	Scotland Under-21	1	(0)
2005	Scotland B	1	(0)

Managerial career
- 2019–2021: Ayr United
- * Club domestic league appearances and goals

Mark Kerr (born 2 March 1982) is a Scottish professional football player and coach.

Kerr started his career with Falkirk in 1998, and later played for Dundee United (appearing in two major finals with the club) and Aberdeen before joining Asteras Tripolis in Greece. On Returning to Scotland, Kerr played for Dunfermline Athletic, Dundee, Partick Thistle and Queen of the South before rejoining Falkirk in 2015. He made one appearance for the Scotland B team in 2005.

In October 2019, Kerr was appointed player/manager of Ayr United. He left this position on 28 February 2021 by mutual consent.

== Club career ==
=== Falkirk ===
Raised in Coatbridge, Kerr started out at his football career at his boyhood club, Celtic. However, he was let go and joined Moodiesburn Boys Club. Kerr then joined Falkirk as a sixteen-year-old, and progressed through the Youth Development scheme at Brockville, so was well known to then-manager Ian McCall and his management team.

Kerr made his Falkirk debut towards the end of the 1998–99 season at the age of 17 against Clydebank. He made two appearances when the 1998–99 season was concluded. The following 1999–00 season, he turned out seven times and scored his first goal in a 3–3 draw at Ayr United.

At the 2000–01 season, Kerr quickly won his first team place at Falkirk, playing as a midfielder. On 21 August 2000, he scored his first goal of the season, in a 3–2 win against Inverness Caledonian Thistle. His performance attracted interests from English clubs, who were interested in signing him. Kerr was even offered a trial by West Ham United and Ipswich Town, but the Bairns didn't let him go halfway through the season. But he went on a trial with Leeds United that saw him out for one match. Amid the transfer speculation, Kerr scored his second goal of the season, in a 1–1 draw against Alloa Athletic on 16 September 2000. In a match against Livingston on 30 September 2000, he impressed throughout 90 minutes and was named Man of the Match. His performances earned him September's Young Player of the Month and October's Young Player of the Month. It was soon expected that Kerr would be leaving Falkirk in the summer after rejected a new contract offered by the Bairns. Despite this, he was named as the second tier's Young Player of the Year for the 2000–01 season. His performance from manager Alex Totten, commenting that Kerr was magnificent, who came a long way. At the end of the 2000–01 season, he made thirty–seven appearances and scoring two times in all competitions.

Ahead of the 2001–02 season, manager Alex Totten is determined to keep Kerr at Falkirk by trying to persuade to sign a contract with the Bairns. However, he rejected a new contract from Falkirk. Amid to his future at the Bairns, Kerr scored his first goal of the season, in a 4–1 win against Arbroath in the first round of the Scottish Challenge Cup. A week later, on 18 August 2001, he scored his first league goal of the season, in a 3–2 win against St Mirren. Kerr continued to regain his first team place at Falkirk. After receiving a red card in a 2–0 loss against Raith Rovers in the second round of the Scottish League Cup match, he scored on his return, in a 2–2 draw against Ayr United on 13 October 2001. However, the Bairns came under fire by the Scottish Football Association after it revealed that Kerr played while on suspension. Falkirk was eventually fined by the Scottish Football Association and Kerr, himself, was suspended once again. Despite this, he signed a contract extension with the Bairns, keeping him until 2003. On 2 March 2002, Kerr scored his fourth goal of the season, in a 3–2 win against Clyde. At the end of the 2001–02 season, he made thirty–five appearances and scoring four times in all competitions.

At the start of the 2002–03 season, Kerr continued to establish himself in the first team, playing in the midfield position. However, by this point, his promising career was stalled, with interests from English clubs declined. Despite this, he has become a key player to the Bairns becoming title contenders in Scottish First Division. On 26 October 2002, Kerr scored his first goal of the season, in a 4–4 draw against St Mirren. With his contract expiring at the end of the 2002–03 season, Aberdeen interested in signing Kerr. This prompted manager John Hughes to offer him a new contract in hopes of staying at Falkirk. In the quarter–final replay of the Scottish Cup replay against Dundee, he received a red card for a second bookable offence, in a 4–1 loss. On 19 April 2003, Kerr scored his second goal of the season, in a 4–1 win against Arbroath to help the Bairns secure the Scottish First Division title. At the end of the 2002–03 season, he made forty–six appearances and scoring two times in all competitions. Throughout his time at Falkirk, Kerr hardly missed a game for the Bairns and by the time he left, he had accumulated 125 appearances and scored nine times.

=== Dundee United ===
On 1 July 2003, Kerr moved to Dundee United on a Bosman transfer, signing a three–year contract. Their manager Ian McCall had been keeping tabs on the Scotland Under-21 player since he himself left Falkirk.

Kerr made his debut for the club, starting the whole game, in a 2–1 loss against Hibernian in the opening game of the season. He soon settled at Tannadice and became a regular in the side. Between mid–October and November, he appeared once for Dundee United, due to being on the substitute bench. On 29 February 2004, Kerr scored his first goal for the Tangerines, in a 2–0 win against Rangers. By the end of his first season, he had racked up 33 League and two cup appearances and scoring once in all competitions. His tenacity in midfield was a feature of the latter part of the campaign in which United finished strongly to take fifth place, their best finish since 1996–97 season.

Commencing the 2004–05 season in the starting eleven, Kerr scored his first goal of the season, in a 3–1 win against Stranraer in the second round of the Scottish League Cup at Tannadice. However, he suffered a dip in form and only appeared another four times before making his way back into the first team at the turn of the year. Kerr then scored his second goal of the season, in a 4–3 thrilling win against Gretna in the third round of the Scottish Cup. He went on to miss only one more match throughout the rest of the season, and became a vital part of the midfield as Gordon Chisholm became manager. Following the 1–1 draw against Inverness Caledonian Thistle on 19 February 2005, Kerr was subjected of abuse by Dundee United's supporters. Despite this, he came on as a 66th-minute substitute, and helped the Tangerines beat Hibernian 2–1 to reach the final. In the derby match against Dundee on 30 April 2005, Kerr produced a Man of the Match performance, in a 2–1 win. In the last game of the season against Inverness Caledonian Thistle, he helped Dundee United win 1–0 to secure the Scottish Premier League status. Kerr played the entirety of the final, as the match ended with the Tangerines loss 1–0 to Celtic. At the end of the 2004–05 season, he went on to make thirty–seven appearances and scoring two times in all competitions.

At the start of the 2005–06 season, Kerr made his European debut, starting the whole game, in a 0–0 draw against MyPa in the first leg of the UEFA Cup second qualifying round. On 19 August 2005, he signed a three–year contract with Dundee United, keeping him until 2008. In the return leg, Kerr scored his first European goal, in a 2–2 draw, as the Tangerines were eliminated from the tournament on away goal. He continued to regain his first team place in the midfield position. His performances was praised by manager Gordon Chisholm, saying: "he has started the season very well and I think his critics have finally been won over." On 11 March 2006, Kerr scored his first league goal of the season, in a 3–1 win against Livingston. At the end of the 2005–06 season, Kerr made thirty–eight appearances and scoring two times in all competitions.

At the start of the 2006–07 season, Kerr set up two goals for Dundee United in two separate matches, coming against Rangers and St Mirren. Since the start of the 2006–07 season, he continued to regain his first team place in the midfield position. During a match against Inverness Caledonian Thistle on 16 September 2006, Kerr was ill and was substituted in the 53rd minute, as the Tangerines drew 0–0. Shortly after, manager Craig Brewster revealed that he returned to training the next day despite his illness, saying: "Mark was ill during the Inverness game so we took him off but he's back in again now and has been training as hard as usual. His attitude is first-class and he's a great professional." When Dundee United meet Inverness Caledonian Thistle again in the fourth round of Scottish Cup on 3 February 2007, Kerr earned a Man of the Match award for his performance despite losing 1–0. After missing two matches through suspension (up until his suspension, he appeared in every match for the Tangerines), Kerr returned to the starting line–up, starting the whole game, in a 2–0 loss against St Mirren on 5 May 2007. At the end of the 2006–07 season, he made forty appearances in all competitions.

At the start of the 2007–08 season, Kerr suffered an injury that saw him not play in the first two league matches. He made his first appearance of the season, in a 0–0 draw against Hibernian on 18 August 2007. Following his return from injury, Kerr found his playing time, coming from the substitute bench. On 10 November 2007, he made his first league starts in three months, and gave his excellent performance, in a 2–0 win against Kilmarnock. Following this, Kerr won back his first team place in the starting eleven. In the 2008 Scottish League Cup Final, with his team 1–0 ahead in the closing minutes of normal time, he was responsible for a careless backpass pounced upon by Kris Boyd who equalised for Rangers; the game moved into extra time and a penalty shoot-out, which United lost. After the match, Kerr apologised to the team for letting them down. Despite this, he remained in the first team for the remainder of the season. At the end of the 2007–08 season, Kerr made thirty–eight appearances in all competitions. Kerr chose to leave when his contract expired at the end of June 2008.

=== Aberdeen ===
In July 2008, it was reported that Kerr was on the verge of a move to Dundee United's New Firm rivals Aberdeen, and he subsequently moved to Pittodrie on a Bosman transfer, taking over the number 8 shirt vacated by Barry Nicholson.

Kerr made his debut for the club, starting the match, in a 2–0 loss against Inverness Caledonian Thistle in the opening game of the season. Since joining Aberdeen, he quickly established himself in the midfield position, forming a partnership with Gary McDonald. Kerr then set up a goal for Andrew Considine to break the deadlock in the 80th minute, as the club won 2–0 against St Mirren on 11 November 2008. He then became Aberdeen's key player in the midfield position for his ability to take the ball down and pass it, as well as, covering huge areas looking for the ball all the time. A month later, on 20 December 2008, Kerr, set up a goal for McDonald, in a 3–0 win against Inverness Caledonian Thistle. In a match against Hibernian on 21 March 2009, however, he received a red card in the 83rd minute for having an altercation with Rob Jones, as the match finished in a 0–0 draw. After serving a three match suspension, Kerr made his return to the starting line–up, in a 3–1 loss against Celtic on 2 May 2009. In a follow–up match against Dundee United, he received a red card in the 75th minute for confronting the referee, as the match ended in a 1–1 draw. After serving one match suspension, Kerr made his return to the starting line–up, in a 1–1 draw against Rangers on 7 May 2009. At the end of the 2008–09 season, he made thirty–six appearances in all competitions.

At the start of the 2009–10 season, Kerr played in both legs of the UEFA Europa League third qualifying round against Sigma Olomouc, as Aberdeen loss 8–1 on aggregate and was eliminated from the tournament. Following this, he was made as the club's captain. Kerr also regained his first team place, playing in either the central midfield and defensive midfield positions. On 11 November 2009, he was among three players to be offered a new contract by manager Mark McGhee. However, Kerr said that he has not been offered a new contract yet. However, in a match against Rangers, on 28 November 2009, Kerr received a red card for a second bookable offence, in a 1–0 win. After serving a one match suspension, he returned to the starting line–up, in a 2–1 loss against Hamilton Academical on 12 December 2009. He scored once for Aberdeen, his goal coming in a 2–1 loss at home to Kilmarnock on 5 May 2010. At the end of the 2009–10 season, Kerr made forty–three appearances and scoring once in all competitions.

=== Asteras Tripolis ===
Kerr agreed to join Greek side Asteras Tripolis; the move was announced on 6 June 2010, signing a three–year contract. Upon joining the club, he was given a number seven shirt ahead of the new season.

Kerr made his debut for Asteras Tripolis, coming on as an 81st-minute substitute, in a 1–0 win against Ergotelis in the opening game of the season. In a match against AEK Athens on 19 September 2010, he set up the club's second goal of the game, in a 2–2 draw. However, Kerr's first team opportunities at Asteras Tripolis limited, due to suffering from a concussion that saw him out for a month. On 18 December 2010, he made his return from injury, coming on as a 70th-minute substitute, in a 0–0 draw against Panionios. Kerr then had to wait for a month to make another appearance for the club against Panserraikos on 27 February 2011, where he came on as a late substitute, in a 1–0 win. His contributions helped the club finish 13th in the 2010–11 Super League Greece. At the end of the 2010–11 season, Kerr made ten appearances in all competitions.

In the 2011–12 season, Kerr played two times for Asteras Tripolis. After months without playing, it was announced on 10 January 2012 that he left the club by mutual consent. Upon leaving Asteras Tripolis, Kerr spoke highly on his time in Greece and praised the club for helping him settle in the country.

=== Dunfermline Athletic ===
On 20 January 2012, Kerr signed for Dunfermline Athletic until the end of the 2011–12 Scottish Premier League season.

He made his debut for the club, starting the whole game, in a 3–0 win against Kilmarnock on 21 January 2012. However, in a match against Rangers on 11 February 2012, Kerr suffered ankle injury and was substituted in the 65th minute, as Dunfermline Athletic loss 4–1. On 24 March 2012, he made his return to the starting line–up, in a 1–1 draw against St Mirren. Despite returning from injury, Kerr was unable to help the club avoid relegation after losing 4–0 against Hibernian on 7 May 2012. At the end of the 2011–12 season, he made thirteen appearances in all competitions.

Following this, Kerr left Dunfermline Athletic despite manager being offered a new contract by Jim Jefferies.

=== Dundee ===
After trial spells with Hibernian and Carlisle United, Kerr signed for Dundee, Dundee United's city rival. Previously, he was on the verge of joining St Johnstone, after the club signed Steve MacLean, the duo having played together during their time at Aberdeen in 2010 while MacLean was on loan. However, the move collapsed despite Kerr having a medical; he was 'frustrated' with the inability to complete the deal. After joining Dundee, Kerr said he didn't know why his move to St Johnstone collapsed.

On 15 September 2012, Kerr made his debut for the club, playing in defensive midfield position, in a 2–1 loss against Motherwell. However, he damaged his cruciate ligament that affected most of the season. On 6 April 2013, Kerr made his return from injury, coming on as a late substitute, in a 2–1 win against Kilmarnock. He then came on as a late substitute, in a 1–1 draw against Aberdeen on 5 May 2013, a result that saw Dundee relegated. At the end of the 2012–13 season, Kerr made eight appearances in all competitions. Following this, he was released by the club.

=== Partick Thistle ===
Kerr began summer 2013 pre-season training with Partick Thistle. On 13 July 2013, he scored a goal from 35 yards in a pre-season friendly against Dumbarton at the Bet Butler Stadium in a 4–3 win. This led him to sign a short-term deal with the Jags.

However, Kerr found himself behind the pecking order in the first team and made no league appearances for Partick Thistle. He only made four appearances for the Jags in the cup competitions. On 30 January 2014, Kerr was released by Partick Thistle.

=== Queen of the South ===
Kerr signed for Queen of the South on 7 February 2014, having been released by Partick Thistle.

He made his debut for the club, coming on as a 62nd-minute substitute, and set up a goal for Gavin Reilly to score his second goal of the game, in a 2–0 win against Falkirk on 8 February 2014. Following his debut for Queen of the South, Kerr said his aim was to help the club earn a Premiership play-off spot. He then played in both legs of the quarter–final Premiership play-offs against Falkirk, as Queen of the South loss 4–3 on aggregate. At the end of the 2013–14 season, Kerr made thirteen appearances in all competitions. Following this, he signed a contract extension with Queen of the South.

The start of the 2014–15 season saw Kerr out, due to an injury. On 27 September 2014, he made his first appearance of the season, coming on as a 78th-minute substitute, in a 2–1 win against Cowdenbeath. Kerr then scored his first goal for Queen of the South, in a 3–0 win against Falkirk on 19 October 2014. Following his return from injury, he started in every match for the club. This lasted until on 30 December 2014, Kerr left the Dumfries club by mutual consent. He made thirteen appearances and scoring once in the first half of the season.

=== Falkirk (second spell) ===
Kerr signed for Falkirk for a second spell on 3 January 2015.

He made his second debut for the Bairns, coming on as a second–half substitute, in a 1–0 win against Alloa Athletic on 11 January 2015. In a follow–up match, Kerr set up the goal for Peter Grant to score an equalising goal, in a 3–3 draw against Hibernian. Two weeks later, on 24 January 2015, he set up the winning goal for Craig Sibbald, in a 3–2 win against Hearts. Since joining Falkirk, Kerr quickly became a first team regular, playing in the midfield position. However, he was cup-tied through the Bairns' Scottish Cup campaign, as Falkirk reached the final, which they loss 2–1 against Inverness Caledonian Thistle. At the end of the 2014–15 season, Kerr made eighteen appearances in all competitions.

At the start of the 2015–16 season, Kerr scored his first goal for Falkirk (his first goal for the Bairns in twelve years), in a 1–0 win against Raith Rovers on 15 August 2015. He continued to regain his first team place, playing in the midfield position. Kerr played a role when he set up a goal for John Baird, who scored a hat–trick, in a 5–0 win against Dumbarton on 24 October 2015. Three weeks later, on 14 November 2015, Kerr, once again, set up a goal for John Barid, who scored a hat–trick for the second time, in a 5–0 win against Alloa Athletic. His performance saw signed a contract extension with the Bairns. On 5 March 2016, he scored his second goal of the season, in a 2–0 win against Alloa Athletic. Kerr played in both legs in the Premiership play-offs semi–finals against Hibernian, as Falkirk won 5–4 on aggregate. Kerr also played in both legs in the Premiership play-offs final against Kilmarnock, as the Bairns loss 4–1 on aggregate. At the end of the 2015–16 season, he made forty–three appearances and scoring two times in all competitions.

At the start of the 2016–17 season, Kerr captained four times in Scottish League Cup, as Falkirk were eliminated from the group stage. He then made his 200th appearance for the Bairns, in a 3–1 win against Dundee United on 17 September 2016. Kerr continued to regain his first team place, playing in the midfield position and captained for Falkirk in the absence of David McCracken. He later helped the Bairns finish second place in the league after beating Dumbarton 1–0 in the last game of the season to earn a spot in the Premiership play-offs. Kerr captained in both legs of the Premiership play-offs against Dundee United, as Falkirk loss 4–2 on aggregate. At the end of the 2016–17 season, Kerr made thirty–nine appearances in all competitions. Following this, he signed a new one-year contract with the Bairns.

Ahead the 2017–18 season, Kerr was appointed as a new captain of Falkirk following the departure of McCracken. He started in the first team for the first five months to the season despite facing his own injury concerns along the way. However, Kerr soon have a fallen out with manager Paul Hartley. As a result, on 24 January 2018, he was released by the Bairns after the side's poor results in the first half of the 2017–18 season. By the time Kerr left Falkirk, he made twenty–two appearances in all competitions. One of his teammates during his return spell was Lee Miller, with whom Kerr had also played in his early years with the club (2000–03), as well as at Dundee United (2005–06) and Aberdeen (2008–10).

=== Ayr United ===
Shortly after leaving Falkirk, Kerr signed for Scottish League One club Ayr United, linking up with former manager Ian McCall for the third time.

He made his debut for the club, starting the whole game, and set up one of the goals, in a 4–1 win against Queen's Park on 27 January 2018. Since joining Ayr United, Kerr quickly became a first team regular for the side, playing in the midfield position. In the last game of the season, he celebrated promotion with the club as league champions after helping Ayr United beat Albion Rovers 2–0 in the last game of the season. At the end of the 2017–18 season, Kerr made fourteen appearances in all competitions. Following this, he signed a new contract with the club for another season.

At the start of the 2018–19 season, Kerr helped Ayr United go on a four match unbeaten run in the Scottish League Cup group stage that send the club through to the knockout stage. He helped Ayr United beat Dundee 3–0 in the second round of the Scottish League Cup before being eliminated by Rangers. Kerr continued to regain his first team place, playing in the midfield position once again. However, injuries and suspensions restricted his second season at the club. At the end of the 2018–19 season, he made thirty appearances in all competitions. Following this, Kerr signed a one–year contract extension with Ayr United.

At the start of the 2019–20 season, Kerr continued to remain in the first team in his third season at Ayr United. He was appointed player/manager of Ayr on 22 October 2019. Kerr's first match as the club's manager came on 25 October 2019, in a 2–1 loss against Dundee. In a follow–up match against Greenock Morton, he helped Ayr United get their first win, in 3–2 win. After sitting out for five matches since becoming manager, Kerr made himself available to the squad for a match against Inverness Caledonian Thistle following an injury crisis on 7 December 2019 and came on as a 78th-minute substitute, in a 2–0 loss. In a match against Dundee United on 21 December 2019 he received a red card for a second bookable offence, in a 4–0 loss. Kerr continued to combine his role as player and manager for the first three months of 2020. However, the season was curtailed because of the COVID-19 pandemic, with the club finishing fourth place. At the end of the 2019–20 season, he made twenty–two appearances in all competitions.

At the start of the 2020–21 season, Kerr said his target was to help Ayr United secure a place in the promotion play-offs and made ten signings in the summer transfer window. Due to spending time in the dugout, he made two appearances for the club. However, Kerr struggled with his second season as a manager of Ayr United with maintaining a positive run of results. After a run of one league win in ten games and with Ayr sitting second-bottom of the Championship, Kerr left Ayr by mutual consent on 28 February 2021.

== Post-playing career ==
In 2016, Kerr assisted with the Forth Valley Football Academy in the development of the young players. Following the sacking of Peter Houston, he assisted Alex Smith for two matches as interim manager of Falkirk.

After leaving Ayr United, Kerr retired from professional football and joined Edinburgh City following the appointment of Alan Maybury on 24 March 2022. Together with Maybury, his contributions helped the club seal promotion to Scottish League One. This led to Maybury taking a permanent job at Edinburgh City. Following the sacking of Maybury, he took charge for one match for the club, in a 4–1 loss against Kelty Hearts on 7 October 2023.

Following the appointment of Michael McIndoe, Kerr left Edinburgh City and joined Clyde as the club's first team coach under Ian McCall. Having committed his future with Clyde at the end of the 2023–24 season, he left the club in October. On 17 January 2025, Kerr was appointed as an assistant manager of Kelty Hearts following the appointment of manager Charlie Mulgrew. However, only after three months at the club, he left after Mulgrew was sacked.

== International career ==
For the rest of 2000, Kerr was featured for the Scotland under-18 side. In April 2001, he was called up to the Scotland under-21 side. His only appearance for the under-21 side came on 24 April 2001, in a 1–0 loss against Poland under-21.

In December 2005, Kerr was called up to the Scotland B team squad. He made an appearance, coming on as a substitute in the Future Cup competition, coincidentally also against Poland B team, playing alongside Lee Miller.

== Personal life ==
In May 2009, Kerr was charged in connection with a late-night brawl at a nightclub that saw him injured and prompted him to miss the last game of the 2008–09 season. He is married.

=== Championship Manager ===
Kerr's name became known around the world to fans of the Championship Manager video game series in the early 2000s, after some of its versions (produced around the time of his breakthrough at Falkirk) programmed his 'potential abilities' generously, whereby he would develop into one of the world's top players.

In an interview for a book based around the series, Kerr stated that he rarely played the games, but had been approached on several occasions by people wishing to share stories of how 'he' helped their team to glory; in the real world, his integration into the unfamiliar environment of Greek football was made easier by his elevated profile in the virtual universe, as some of his new teammates recognised his name from the game.

== Career statistics ==
=== Player ===
As of 18 May 2019

Appearances and goals by club, season and competition
Club	Season	League			Scottish Cup		League Cup		Other		Total	
Club	Season	Division	Apps	Goals	Apps	Goals	Apps	Goals	Apps	Goals	Apps	Goals
Falkirk	1998–99	Scottish First Division	2	0	0	0	0	0	0	0	2	0
Falkirk	1999–00	Scottish First Division	7	1	0	0	0	0	0	0	7	1
Falkirk	2000–01	Scottish First Division	32	2	2	0	2	0	1 (Note: Appearances in the Scottish Challenge Cup)	0	37	2
Falkirk	2001–02	Scottish First Division	30	3	1	0	2	0	2	1	35	4
Falkirk	2002–03	Scottish First Division	36	2	4	0	3	0	3	0	43	2
Falkirk	Total		107	8	7	0	7	0	6	1	127	9
Dundee United	2003–04	Scottish Premier League	33	1	0	0	2	0	—		35	1
Dundee United	2004–05	Scottish Premier League	30	0	5	1	2	1	—		37	2
Dundee United	2005–06	Scottish Premier League	35	1	1	0	0	0	2 (Note: Appearances in the UEFA Cup)	1	38	2
Dundee United	2006–07	Scottish Premier League	36	0	2	0	2	0	—		40	0
Dundee United	2007–08	Scottish Premier League	30	0	3	0	5	0	—		38	0
Dundee United	Total		164	2	11	1	11	1	2	1	188	5
Aberdeen	2008–09	Scottish Premier League	32	0	4	0	2	0	—		38	0
Aberdeen	2009–10	Scottish Premier League	37	1	3	0	1	0	2 (Note: Appearances in the Europa League)	0	43	1
Aberdeen	Total		69	1	7	0	3	0	2	0	81	1
Asteras Tripolis	2010–11	Super League Greece	9	0	1	0	—		—		10	0
Asteras Tripolis	2011–12	Super League Greece	2	0	0	0	—		—		2	0
Asteras Tripolis	Total		11	0	1	0	—		—		12	0
Dunfermline Athletic	2011–12	Scottish Premier League	13	0	0	0	0	0	—		13	0
Dundee	2012–13	Scottish Premier League	8	0	0	0	0	0	—		8	0
Partick Thistle	2013–14	Scottish Premiership	0	0	1	0	3	0	—		4	0
Queen of the South	2013–14	Scottish Championship	11	0	0	0	0	0	2 (Note: Appearances in the Premiership promotion play-offs)	0	13	0
Queen of the South	2014–15	Scottish Championship	12	1	1	0	0	0	0	0	13	1
Queen of the South	Total		23	1	1	0	0	0	2	0	26	1
Falkirk	2014–15	Scottish Championship	18	0	—		0	0	0	0	18	0
Falkirk	2015–16	Scottish Championship	35	2	1	0	2	0	5 (Note: One appearance in the Scottish Challenge Cup and four in the Premiership promotion play-offs)	0	43	2
Falkirk	2016–17	Scottish Championship	30	0	1	0	4	0	4 (Note: Two appearances in the Scottish Challenge Cup and two in the Premiership promotion play-offs)	0	39	0
Falkirk	2017–18	Scottish Championship	15	0	0	0	5	0	2	0	22	0
Falkirk	Total		98	2	2	0	11	0	11	0	122	2
Ayr United	2017–18	Scottish League One	14	0	0	0	0	0	0	0	14	0
Ayr United	2018–19	Scottish Championship	22	0	0	0	6	0	2 (Note: Two appearances in the Premiership promotion play-offs)	0	30	0
Ayr United	Total		36	0	0	0	6	0	2	0	44	0
Career total			515	14	30	1	41	1	25	2	611	18

=== Managerial record ===
As of match played 20 February 2021

Managerial record by team and tenure
Team	From	To	Record				
Team	From	To	G	W	D	L	Win %
Ayr United	22 October 2019	28 February 2021	41	13	11	17	31.71

== Honours ==
Falkirk

- Scottish First Division: 2002–03

Dundee United

- Scottish Cup: Runner-up 2004–05
- Scottish League Cup: Runner-up 2007–08

Ayr United

- Scottish League One: 2017–18
