= Marko Đorđević (footballer) =

Serbian footballer

Personal information
- Full name: Marko Đorđević
- Date of birth: 22 May 1983 (age 43)
- Place of birth: Kruševac, SFR Yugoslavia
- Height: 1.85 m (6 ft 1 in)
- Position: Centre-back

Team information
- Current team: Velež Mostar (assistant)

Youth career
- Napredak Kruševac

Senior career*
Years	Team	Apps	(Gls)
2001–2009	Napredak Kruševac	146	(5)
2001–2002	→ 14. Oktobar (loan)		
2009–2010	Jagodina	32	(0)
2011–2012	Kairat	41	(3)
2013	Okzhetpes		
2014	Amicale		
2014	Radnički Kragujevac	0	(0)
2014–2018	Auckland City	33	(4)
2018–2020	Central United		
2020	Jedinstvo Paraćin		
2020–2021	Kopaonik Brus		
2021	Blagotin Poljna		

Managerial career
- 2022–2023: Honvéd Budapest (assistant)
- 2023–2024: Velež Mostar (assistant)
- 2024–2026: Široki Brijeg (assistant)
- 2026–: Velež Mostar (assistant)
- * Club domestic league appearances and goals

Marko Đorđević (Serbian Cyrillic: Марко Ђорђевић; born 22 May 1983) is a Serbian retired footballer who played as a centre back.

== Career ==
In November 2014, Đorđević signed for Auckland City.

He joined Dean Klafurić as his assistant at Velež Mostar in August 2023, after leaving Hungarian side Honvéd Budapest alongside Klafurić three months earlier.

== Career statistics ==
As of match played 25 November 2017

Appearances and goals by club, season and competition
Club	Season	League			National Cup		Continental		Other		Total	
Club	Season	Division	Apps	Goals	Apps	Goals	Apps	Goals	Apps	Goals	Apps	Goals
Jagodina	2009–10	Serbian SuperLiga	23	0	1	0	—		—		24	0
Jagodina	2010–11	Serbian SuperLiga	9	0	0	0	—		—		9	0
Jagodina	Total		32	0	1	0	—		—		33	0
Kairat	2011	Kazakhstan Premier League	21	1			—		—		21	1
Kairat	2012	Kazakhstan Premier League	20	2	2	0	—		—		22	2
Kairat	Total		41	3	2	0	—		—		43	3
Okzhetpes	2013	Kazakhstan First Division					—		—			
Amicale	2013–14	TVL Premier League					7	1	—		7	1
Auckland City (loan)	2014–15	ASB Premiership	12	4			5	1	3	0	20	5
Auckland City (loan)	2015–16	ASB Premiership	9	0			0	0	1	0	10	0
Auckland City (loan)	2016–17	ASB Premiership	10	0			0	0	0	0	10	0
Auckland City (loan)	2017–18	ASB Premiership	2	0			5	0	0	0	7	0
Auckland City (loan)	Total		33	4			10	1	4	0	47	5
Career total			106	7	3	0	17	2	4	0	130	9

== Honours ==
Amicale

- Vanuatu Premia Divisen: 2013–14

Auckland City

- ASB Premiership (1): 2014–15
- OFC Champions League (1): 2014–15
