= Stuart Duff =

Scottish footballer

Personal information
- Date of birth: 23 January 1982 (age 44)
- Place of birth: Aberdeen, Scotland
- Positions: Midfielder; defender

Team information
- Current team: Aberdeen (Talent development manager)

Youth career
- 1998–1999: Dundee United

Senior career*
Years	Team	Apps	(Gls)
1999–2008	Dundee United	152	(3)
2008–2010	Aberdeen	47	(1)
2009	→ Inverness Caledonian Thistle (loan)	1	(0)
2010–2011	Inverness Caledonian Thistle	34	(1)
2011	Ayr United (trialist)	3	(0)
2011–2012	Qormi	6	(0)
2012–2013	Kairat	50	(1)
2014–2017	Cove Rangers		
2017–2019	Inverurie Loco Works		

International career
2002–2003	Scotland U21	10	(0)
- * Club domestic league appearances and goals

Stuart Duff (born 23 January 1982) is a Scottish professional football coach and former player who is currently the Talent development manager of Aberdeen. He was primarily a central midfielder, although his versatility saw him play in most defensive and midfield positions.

Duff began his career with Dundee United, going on to make 171 first team appearances in nine years at the club. He later played for Aberdeen and Inverness Caledonian Thistle, before leaving Scotland for spells with Qormi in Malta and Kairat in Kazakhstan. He joined Cove Rangers in 2014, then signed for Inverurie Loco Works in 2017.

He is a former Scotland under-21 internationalist, having made ten appearances between 2002 and 2003.

== Career ==
=== Dundee United ===
Having been developed as a player through Dundee United's youth scheme, he turned professional with the club in July 1999. He was given his debut by then-manager Alex Smith in December 2001, when he was used as a right wing back in a match at Kilmarnock, and went on to make nine appearances that season, collecting the April 'Young Player of the Month' award. In 2002–03, Duff had his best run of league games, playing 34 times. When Ian McCall was appointed at the start of the 2003–04 season, Duff found himself more often as a substitute, playing in just 18 league games. During that season, Duff was part of the Scotland under-21 side that narrowly missed out on qualifying for the 2004 UEFA European Under-21 Football Championship, with Scotland losing to Croatia in the play-off. The following season, Duff played 25 league games, earning him a new three-year contract in March 2005. Shortly afterwards, Duff was part of the United side that lost narrowly to Celtic in the Scottish Cup final, with his 83rd-minute substitute appearance earning him a runners-up medal.

In 2005–06, with Gordon Chisholm the new manager, Duff played more first team games, with 29 league appearances. During February 2006, Duff alleged he was spat on by Hearts midfielder Rudi Skacel, a claim repeated two months later by Celtic captain Neil Lennon. No action was taken against Skacel in either incident. Duff scored an important goal in the 1–0 win over Rangers at Ibrox during the season, which helped United avoid relegation. Duff started the 2006–07 season as an attacking midfielder under Craig Brewster and scored once, although was used in a variety of defensive roles under Craig Levein.

=== Aberdeen ===
In January 2008, Levein told Duff he was free to leave Tannadice and find himself a new club. He was released on 17 January, after playing 170 games for the club, scoring four times. Duff began training with fellow SPL side Aberdeen and a short-term move to his home town club was confirmed the following day, seeing him become the third player to move from Tannadice to Pittodrie in eighteen months, following Lee Miller and Lee Mair. Within six weeks of arriving, however, Duff was one of several players manager Jimmy Calderwood threatened to release at the end of the season, due to the club's poor performances. In May 2008, Duff instead signed a two-year contract extension with Aberdeen.

=== Inverness Caledonian Thistle ===
Duff was loaned to Inverness Caledonian Thistle for a month in December 2009.

After his release by Aberdeen, Duff had a trial spell with St Johnstone and turned down an approach from St Mirren before signing for Inverness Caledonian Thistle. Duff agreed a deal that was to run until the end of the 2010–11 season. Throughout the 2010/11 season he was a regular starter for Caley, and featured in most of their surprising results. These included a 1–1 draw against Rangers at Ibrox and a 2–2 draw with Celtic at Parkhead. His contract expired with ICT at the end of the 2010/11 season, and he stated his desire to stay with Inverness and said he would accept their contract offer after returning from holiday. In the summer of 2011, a contract was offered, but no deal was agreed and the contract offer was eventually withdrawn.

=== Playing Abroad ===
Duff played three games for Ayr United as a trialist in September 2011.

In November 2011, Duff agreed to join Qormi, in the Maltese Premier League, for the remainder of the season.

=== Kairat ===
In February 2012, Duff agreed to join Kazakhstan Premier League side FC Kairat on a lucrative one-year deal and was given the number 21 shirt. Duff scored his first goal for Kairat in their 2–0 victory over FC Sunkar on 8 April 2012. Kairat finished the season in 10th place. Duff had his contract extended for another year, keeping him at the club until the end of the 2013 season. Duff left Kairat at the end of the 2013 season, as Kazakhstan Premier League rules state that foreign players over the age of 30 must be playing for their national team in order to play in their league.

=== Highland League ===
On 14 October 2014, Duff signed a short-term deal with Highland Football League side Cove Rangers. In January 2015, Duff signed a new two-and-a-half-year contract with the club, despite interest from Scottish League Two side Montrose. In January 2017, he was transferred to another Highland League club, Inverurie Loco Works.

== Post-playing career ==
After returning from a two-year spell in Kazakhstan with FC Kairat, Duff began working in the Oil & Gas sector in his native Aberdeen for Halliburton. Duff also began scouting youngsters in Scotland for Manchester City youth in early 2016.

In September 2021 he rejoined Aberdeen as their Youth Phase Manager. He was made caretaker manager of the Aberdeen first team in November 2026, following the sacking of Stephen Robinson.

== Career statistics ==
=== Club ===
As of match played 2 November 2013

Appearances and goals by club, season and competition
Club	Season	League			National Cup		League Cup		Continental		Other		Total	
Club	Season	Division	Apps	Goals	Apps	Goals	Apps	Goals	Apps	Goals	Apps	Goals	Apps	Goals
Dundee United	1999–00	Scottish Premier League	0	0	0	0	0	0	-		-		0	0
Dundee United	2000–01	Scottish Premier League	0	0	0	0	0	0	-		-		0	0
Dundee United	2001–02	Scottish Premier League	9	0	0	0	0	0	-		-		9	0
Dundee United	2002–03	Scottish Premier League	34	0	0	0	4	0	-		-		38	0
Dundee United	2003–04	Scottish Premier League	18	0	1	0	1	0	-		-		20	0
Dundee United	2004–05	Scottish Premier League	25	2	4	1	3	0	-		-		32	3
Dundee United	2005–06	Scottish Premier League	29	0	1	0	1	0	1	0	-		32	0
Dundee United	2006–07	Scottish Premier League	28	1	2	0	0	0	-		-		30	1
Dundee United	2007–08	Scottish Premier League	9	0	0	0	0	0	-		-		20	0
Dundee United	Total		152	3	8	1	9	0	1	0	-	-	170	4
Aberdeen	2007–08	Scottish Premier League	10	0	1	0	0	0	-		-		11	0
Aberdeen	2008–09	Scottish Premier League	20	1	2	0	0	0	-		-		22	1
Aberdeen	2009–10	Scottish Premier League	17	0	0	0	0	0	2	0	-		22	1
Aberdeen	Total		47	1	3	0	0	0	2	0	-	-	52	1
Inverness Caledonian Thistle (loan)	2009–10	Scottish First Division	1	0	0	0	0	0	–		–		1	0
Inverness Caledonian Thistle	2010–11	Scottish Premier League	34	1	3	0	0	0	–		–		37	1
Ayr United (trialist)	2011–12	Scottish First Division	3	0	0	0	0	0	–		–		3	0
Qormi	2011–12	Maltese Premier League	6	0	0	0	–		–		–		6	0
Kairat	2012	Kazakhstan Premier League	24	1	2	0	–		–		–		26	1
Kairat	2013	Kazakhstan Premier League	26	0	1	0	–		–		–		27	0
Kairat	Total		50	1	3	0	-	-	-	-	-	-	53	1
Career total			293	6	17	1	9	0	3	0	-	-	322	7
