= Alberto Heredia (footballer) =

Spanish footballer

Personal information
- Full name: Alberto Heredia Ceballos-Zúñiga
- Date of birth: 20 December 1982 (age 43)
- Place of birth: Cádiz, Spain
- Height: 1.81 m (5 ft 11 in)
- Position: Forward

Team information
- Current team: Rota

Youth career
- Real Madrid

Senior career*
| Years | Team | Apps | (Gls) |
| 2006–2007 | Sevilla Atlético | 3 | (0) |
| 2007 | Marbella | 11 | (0) |
| 2008 | Burgos | 15 | (1) |
| 2008–2009 | Peña Deportiva | 33 | (4) |
| 2009 | Terrassa | 18 | (0) |
| 2010 | Getafe B | 6 | (0) |
| 2010–2011 | Roteña | 5 | (0) |
| 2011 | Chieti | 4 | (0) |
| 2012 | Lorca Atlético | 1 | (0) |
| 2012 | Kairat | 18 | (0) |
| 2014–2015 | Real Estelí | 13 | (0) |
| 2015 | Sanluqueño | 22 | (1) |
| 2015–2016 | Conquense | 36 | (0) |
| 2016 | Eldense | 8 | (0) |
| 2017 | Alcobendas | 6 | (1) |
| 2018 | Guadalajara | 23 | (1) |
| 2018–2019 | Conil | 24 | (1) |
| 2019 | Xerez Deportivo | 8 | (0) |
| 2019– | Rota | 40 | (3) |
- * Club domestic league appearances and goals as of 00:44, 28 May 2021 (UTC)

Alberto Heredia Ceballos-Zúñiga (born 2 March 1987) is a Spanish footballer who plays for Rota as a forward.

== Football career ==
Born in Cádiz, Andalusia, Heredia played youth football at Real Madrid, sharing teams with future Spanish international Juan Mata. He made his senior debuts with Sevilla Atlético, appearing rarely as the Andalusian side promoted to Segunda División for the first time ever.

In the following three years, Heredia continued in Segunda División B: in the 2007–08 season he represented UD Marbella and Burgos CF, being relegated with the former. Subsequently, he met the same fate with both Santa Eulàlia and Terrassa FC, finishing the latter campaign with Getafe CF's reserves in Tercera División.

In January 2012, after one 1/2 seasons in Italy with S.S. Chieti Calcio, Heredia returned to his country and signed for Lorca Atlético CF. He followed that with a stin in Kazakhstan with Kairat. He moved to the Nicaraguan side Real Estelí on 24 January 2013.

He returned to Spain in 2015, and has since has stints with Sanluqueño, Conquense, Eldense, Alcobendas, Guadalajara, Conil, Xerez Deportivo, and most recently Rota.

== Club statistics ==
As of match played 18 May 2014

Appearances and goals by club, season and competition
| Club | Season | League | | | National Cup | | Continental | | Total | |
| Club | Season | Division | Apps | Goals | Apps | Goals | Apps | Goals | Apps | Goals |
|---|---|---|---|---|---|---|---|---|---|---|
| Sevilla Atlético | 2006–07 | Segunda División B | 3 | 0 | – | | – | | 3 | 0 |
| Marbella | 2007–08 | Segunda División B | 11 | 0 | – | | – | | 11 | 0 |
| Burgos | 2007–08 | Segunda División B | 15 | 1 | – | | – | | 15 | 1 |
| Santa Eulàlia | 2008–09 | Segunda División B | 33 | 4 | – | | – | | 33 | 4 |
| Terrassa | 2009–10 | Segunda División B | 18 | 0 | – | | – | | 18 | 0 |
| Getafe B | 2009–10 | Tercera División | 6 | 0 | – | | – | | 6 | 0 |
| Roteña | 2010–11 | Primera División Andaluza | 5 | 0 | – | | – | | 5 | 0 |
| Chieti | 2011–12 | Lega Pro Seconda Divisione | 4 | 0 | – | | – | | 4 | 0 |
| Lorca Atlético | 2011–12 | Segunda División B | 1 | 0 | – | | – | | 1 | 0 |
| Kairat | 2012 | Kazakhstan Premier League | 18 | 0 | 2 | 0 | – | | 20 | 0 |
| Real Estelí | 2013–14 | Primera División de Nicaragua | 13 | 0 | – | | – | | 13 | 0 |
| Atlético Sanluqueño | 2014–15 | Tercera División | | | – | | – | | | |
| Conquense | 2015–16 | Tercera División | | | – | | – | | | |
| Career total | | | 127 | 5 | 2 | 0 | - | - | 129 | 5 |
