= Óscar García (footballer, born 1988) =

Spanish footballer

Personal information
- Full name: Óscar García Guerrero
- Date of birth: 12 July 1988 (age 38)
- Place of birth: Granada, Spain
- Height: 1.71 m (5 ft 7 in)
- Position: Striker

Youth career
- 2000–2002: Atlético La Zubia
- 2002–2006: Málaga

Senior career*
Years	Team	Apps	(Gls)
2006–2010	Málaga B	102	(33)
2010	Málaga	0	(0)
2010	Leganés	7	(1)
2011	Ontinyent	16	(7)
2011–2012	San Roque	32	(6)
2012	Kairat	10	(1)
2013	Loja	11	(3)
2013–2014	Birkebeineren	21	(15)
2014	Moss	11	(13)
2015	Auckland City	9	(5)
2015	Raufoss	11	(5)
2016	Egersunds	9	(4)
2016–2018	Leioa	66	(19)
2018–2019	Melilla	33	(14)
2019–2021	Marbella	40	(9)
2021–2022	El Ejido	23	(3)
2022–2023	Huétor Vega	19	(4)
2024–2025	Atlético La Zubia	17	(2)
- * Club domestic league appearances and goals as of 07:25, 12 November 2025 (UTC)

Óscar García Guerrero (born 12 July 1988) is a Spanish footballer who plays as a striker.

== Club career ==
García was born in Granada, Andalusia. A product of Málaga CF's youth ranks, he made his debut with the first team on 13 January 2010, in a Copa del Rey match against Getafe CF (5–1 away loss, 6–3 on aggregate). He spent nearly four full seasons with the reserves in the Tercera División, also playing six Segunda División B matches in 2006–07 and scoring twice in a relegation-ending campaign.

In the summer of 2010, after failing to appear in the league for Málaga during his four-year senior spell, García signed with CD Leganés of division three. He finished the season with another side in that tier, Ontinyent CF, then moved to CD San Roque de Lepe in the ensuing off-season.

García joined FC Kairat in Kazakhstan on 12 July 2012. One year later, after a brief stint in his country with lowly Loja CD, he moved abroad again, signing with IF Birkebeineren in Norway's third division alongside compatriot Jorge Pina. In July 2015 he transferred to another team in the latter competition, Raufoss IL, from Auckland City FC in the New Zealand Football Championship.

After another year in the Norwegian third division, now with Egersunds IK, García returned to his homeland and signed with SD Leioa also in that tier. For 2018–19, he agreed to a contract at UD Melilla.

== Career statistics ==
As of match played 8 March 2018

Appearances and goals by club, season and competition
Club	Season	League			National Cup		Continental		Total	
Club	Season	Division	Apps	Goals	Apps	Goals	Apps	Goals	Apps	Goals
Málaga	2009–10	La Liga	0	0	1	0	–		1	0
Leganés	2010–11	Segunda División B	7	1	1	0	–		8	1
Ontinyent	2010–11	Segunda División B	16	7	0	0	–		16	7
San Roque	2011–12	Segunda División B	32	6	4	0	–		36	6
Kairat	2012	Kazakhstan Premier League	10	1	0	0	–		10	1
Loja	2012–13	Segunda División B	11	3	0	0	–		11	3
Birkebeineren	2013	2. divisjon	8	8	0	0	–		8	8
Birkebeineren	2014	2. divisjon	12	7	1	1	–		13	8
Birkebeineren	Total		20	15	1	1	-	-	21	16
Moss	2014	2. divisjon	11	13	0	0	–		11	13
Auckland City	2014–15	Football Championship	9	5			2	0	11	5
Raufoss	2015	2. divisjon	11	5	0	0	–		11	5
Egersunds	2016	2. divisjon	9	4	2	1	–		11	5
Leioa	2016–17	Segunda División B	31	9	0	0	–		31	9
Leioa	2017–18	Segunda División B	26	8	1	0	–		27	8
Leioa	Total		57	17	1	0	-	-	58	17
Career total			193	78	10	2	2	0	205	80

== Honours ==
Auckland City

- New Zealand Football Championship: 2014–15
- OFC Champions League: 2014–15
