= Stuart Abbot =

Scottish footballer

Personal information
- Date of birth: 21 June 1986 (age 40)
- Place of birth: Dundee, Scotland
- Height: 5 ft 7 in (1.70 m)
- Position: Right back

Team information
- Current team: Banks O' Dee

Youth career
- Dundee United

Senior career*
Years	Team	Apps	(Gls)
2003–2006	Dundee United	3	(0)
2006	Forfar Athletic	1	(0)
2006–2008	Carnoustie Panmure		
2008–2009	Lochee United		
- Banks O' Dee
- * Club domestic league appearances and goals as of 13:52, 21 February 2009 (UTC)

Stuart Abbot (born 21 June 1986) is a Scottish footballer who plays in midfield for junior side Banks O' Dee. He began his career with Dundee United, making three appearances in the Scottish Premier League (SPL) in 2006. He has also played junior football for Carnoustie Panmure and Lochee United.

== Career ==
Abbot, born in Dundee, began his career with Dundee United, making his senior debut in April 2006 as a late substitute in a Scottish Premier League match at Inverness Caledonian Thistle. Offered a new one-year contract shortly afterwards, Abbot made his full debut at home the following week, although his third appearance ended early due to injury. It proved to be Abbot's last appearance in senior football; he quit professional football in September to pursue full-time university studies, and he was released from his United contract, subsequently joining local side Carnoustie Panmure. Abbot moved to Lochee United in July 2008. Having graduated from university, he relocated to Aberdeen. Abbot trained with junior side Banks O' Dee and after proving his fitness signed for the club.

== Career statistics ==
Club	Season	League		Cup		Lg Cup		Other		Total	
Club	Season	Apps	Goals	Apps	Goals	Apps	Goals	Apps	Goals	Apps	Goals
Dundee United	2003–04	0	0	0	0	0	0	0	0	0	0
Dundee United	2004–05	0	0	0	0	0	0	0	0	0	0
Dundee United	2005–06	3	0	0	0	0	0	0	0	3	0
Dundee United	Total	3	0	0	0	0	0	0	0	3	0
Career total		3	0	0	0	0	0	0	0	3	0
