= Lorca Atlético CF =

Lorca Atlético
- Full name: Lorca Atlético Club de Fútbol
- Founded: 1 July 2010; 15 years ago (relocation of Sangonera Atlético Club de Fútbol)
- Dissolved: 1 August 2012; 13 years ago
- Ground: Francisco Artés Carrasco, Lorca, Murcia, Spain
- Capacity: 8,120
- Chairman: Cristóbal Sánchez
- 2011–12: 2ªB – Group 4, 16th
Home colours	Away colours

Lorca Atlético Club de Fútbol was a Spanish football team based in Lorca, in the Region of Murcia. Founded in 2010, it held its home games at the Estadio Francisco Artés Carrasco, with a capacity of 8,120 seats. The club was relegated to Preferente Autonómica for not paying its players and disappeared in August 2012.

== History ==
In July 2010 Cristóbal Sánchez Arcas, an entrepreneur from Lorca, Spain, bought Murcia-based club Sangonera Atlético CF and moved it to his city. It started competing professionally in the third division.

In June 2012, Lorca Atlético was doubly relegated: after finishing the season in 16th position, it suffered a further drop to the regional championships for failing to pay its players.

== Season to season ==
Season	Tier	Division	Place	Copa del Rey
2010–11	3	2ª B	15th	
2011–12	3	2ª B	16th	

- 2 seasons in Segunda División B
