= Dmitry Mamonov =

Kazakhstani footballer and manager

Dmitriy Mamonov
Personal information
- Full name: Dmitriy Nikolayevich Mamonov
- Date of birth: 26 April 1978 (age 48)
- Height: 1.73 m (5 ft 8 in)
- Position: Midfielder

Team information
- Current team: FC Novosibirsk (conditioning coach)

Senior career*
Years	Team	Apps	(Gls)
1993–1996	FC Kainar	28	(0)
1997–1998	FC Chkalovets Novosibirsk	38	(2)
1999	FC Zhetysu	13	(2)
2000	FC CSKA Kairat	9	(1)
2001	FC Kairat	20	(3)
2002	FC Vostok-Altyn	18	(4)
2003	FC Aktobe-Lento	15	(1)
2003–2009	FC Zhetysu	164	(27)
2010	FC Atyrau	18	(0)
2011	FC Vostok	25	(1)
2012	FC Kairat	14	(1)
2013	FC Zhetysu	10	(0)

International career
2000–2001	Kazakhstan	4	(0)

Managerial career
- 2015–2016: FC Sibir-2 Novosibirsk
- 2016: FC Sibir-2 Novosibirsk (assistant)
- 2016–2018: LFK Sibir Novosibirsk (assistant)
- 2018–2019: FC Sibir-2 Novosibirsk (assistant)
- 2019: FC Sibir-2 Novosibirsk
- 2019–: FC Novosibirsk (conditioning coach)
- * Club domestic league appearances and goals

Dmitriy Nikolayevich Mamonov (Russian: Дмитрий Николаевич Мамонов; born 26 April 1978) is a Kazakhstani football manager and a former player. He is the conditioning coach of FC Novosibirsk.

== Honours ==
Kairat

- Kazakhstan Cup winner: 2001
