= Alyaksandr Bychanok =

Belarusian footballer

Personal information
- Date of birth: 30 May 1985 (age 41)
- Place of birth: Mogilev, Belarusian SSR, Soviet Union
- Height: 1.76 m (5 ft 9 in)
- Position: Midfielder

Youth career
- 2001–2003: Dnepr-Transmash Mogilev

Senior career*
Years	Team	Apps	(Gls)
2003–2005	Dnepr-Transmash Mogilev	75	(2)
2006–2008	Shakhtyor Soligorsk	66	(2)
2009–2010	Dnepr Mogilev	52	(8)
2011–2013	Dinamo Minsk	71	(9)
2012	→ Kairat Almaty (loan)	7	(0)
2014	Gomel	27	(0)
2015–2017	Trakai	84	(9)
2018–2020	Isloch Minsk Raion	61	(0)

International career^{‡}
2004–2006	Belarus U21	10	(0)
2011	Belarus Olympic	1	(0)
2011	Belarus	5	(0)
- * Club domestic league appearances and goals as of 31 December 2020 ‡ National team caps and goals as of 31 July 2012

Alyaksandr Bychanok (Belarusian: Аляксандр Бычанок; Russian: Александр Быченок; born 30 May 1985) is a Belarusian former footballer. He has been capped for the Belarus national football team in 2011.
