= 2016 FC Astana season =

FC Astana
2016 season
- Chairman: Kaisar Bekenov
- Manager: Stanimir Stoilov
- Stadium: Astana Arena
- Premier League: 1st
- Kazakhstan Cup: Winners
- Champions League: Third qualifying round vs Celtic
- Europa League: Group Stage
- Kazakhstan Super Cup: Runners-up
- Top goalscorer: League: Đorđe Despotović (8); All: Đorđe Despotović (13)
- Highest home attendance: 29,000 vs Celtic (27 July 2016)
- Lowest home attendance: 500 vs Caspiy (27 April 2016)
- Average home league attendance: 7,482 (24 November 2016)
Home colours	Away colours

The 2016 FC Astana season is the eighth successive season that the club will play in the Kazakhstan Premier League, the highest tier of association football in Kazakhstan. Astana are defending Kazakhstan Premier League Champions, having been crowned Champions for the second time the previous season. They will also participate in the Kazakhstan Cup and the Champions League, entering at the Second Qualifying Stage.

== Squad ==
As of match played 9 December 2016

No.	Name	Nationality	Position	Date of birth (age)	Signed from	Signed in	Apps.	Goals
Goalkeepers
1	Nenad Erić	(Serbia)	GK	26 May 1982 (aged 34)	Kairat	2011	202	0
35	Aleksandr Mokin	(Kazakhstan)	GK	19 June 1981 (aged 35)	Shakhter Karagandy	2016	8	0
40	Mikhail Golubnichi	(Kazakhstan)	GK	31 January 1995 (aged 21)	Bayterek	2015	7	0
47	Abylaikhan Duysen	(Kazakhstan)	GK	3 June 1994 (aged 22)	Bayterek	2016	0	0
51	Damil Podymsky	(Kazakhstan)	GK	5 June 1998 (aged 18)	Academy	2016	0	0
85	Oleg Medvedev	(Kazakhstan)	GK	21 March 2000 (aged 16)	Academy	2016	0	0
90	Sayenko Vladislav	(Kazakhstan)	GK	4 June 2000 (aged 16)	Academy	2016	0	0
Defenders
5	Marin Aničić	(Bosnia and Herzegovina)	DF	17 August 1989 (aged 27)	Zrinjski Mostar	2014	117	7
14	Igor Shitov	(Belarus)	DF	24 October 1986 (aged 30)	Mordovia Saransk	2016	23	0
22	Konstantin Engel	(Kazakhstan)	DF	27 July 1988 (aged 28)	Ingolstadt 04	2016	0	0
25	Serhiy Malyi	(Kazakhstan)	DF	5 June 1990 (aged 26)	Irtysh Pavlodar	2016	18	1
27	Yuriy Logvinenko	(Kazakhstan)	DF	22 July 1988 (aged 28)	Aktobe	2016	38	3
28	Birzhan Kulbekov	(Kazakhstan)	DF	22 April 1994 (aged 22)	Academy	2015	15	1
33	Alim Ilyasov	(Kazakhstan)	DF	22 June 2000 (aged 16)	Academy	2016	0	0
48	Alexandr Berg	(Kazakhstan)	DF	4 February 1997 (aged 19)	Academy	2016	0	0
57	Kashken Dinmuhammed	(Kazakhstan)	DF	4 January 2000 (aged 16)	Academy	2016	0	0
72	Sanzhar Aitym	(Kazakhstan)	DF	2 March 2000 (aged 16)	Academy	2016	0	0
74	Sagi Sovet	(Kazakhstan)	DF	15 March 2000 (aged 16)	Academy	2016	0	0
77	Dmitri Shomko	(Kazakhstan)	DF	19 March 1990 (aged 26)	Irtysh Pavlodar	2014	133	7
92	Danil Mikhailov	(Kazakhstan)	DF	29 February 2000 (aged 16)	Academy	2016	0	0
95	Amanbol Aliyev	(Kazakhstan)	DF	10 July 1995 (aged 21)	Academy	2014	3	0
99	Talgat Kussyapov	(Kazakhstan)	DF	14 February 1999 (aged 17)	Academy	2016	0	0
Midfielders
6	Nemanja Maksimović	(Serbia)	MF	26 January 1995 (aged 21)	Domžale	2015	81	12
7	Serikzhan Muzhikov	(Kazakhstan)	MF	17 June 1989 (aged 27)	Zhetysu	2014	88	5
8	Askhat Tagybergen	(Kazakhstan)	MF	9 August 1990 (aged 26)	Aktobe	2016	35	4
9	Agim Ibraimi	(North Macedonia)	MF	29 August 1988 (aged 28)	Maribor	2016	11	1
12	Gevorg Najaryan	(Kazakhstan)	MF	6 January 1998 (aged 18)	Shakhter Karagandy	2016	7	0
13	Azat Nurgaliev	(Kazakhstan)	MF	30 June 1986 (aged 30)	loan from Ordabasy	2016	18	7
15	Abzal Beisebekov	(Kazakhstan)	MF	30 November 1992 (aged 24)	Vostok	2012	169	4
31	Abay Zhunussov	(Kazakhstan)	MF	15 March 1995 (aged 21)	Academy	2016	5	0
37	Amir Kalabayev	(Kazakhstan)	MF	13 November 1996 (aged 20)	Academy	2015	2	0
54	Ardak Saulet	(Kazakhstan)	MF	12 January 1997 (aged 19)	Academy	2014	1	0
58	Alisher Saginov	(Kazakhstan)	MF	20 January 1998 (aged 18)	Academy	2016	0	0
66	Ruslan Mahan	(Kazakhstan)	MF	7 January 2000 (aged 16)	Academy	2016	0	0
70	Sultan Sagnayev	(Kazakhstan)	MF	14 January 2000 (aged 16)	Academy	2016	1	0
71	Madi Zhakipbayev	(Kazakhstan)	MF	14 January 2000 (aged 16)	Academy	2016	4	0
88	Roger Cañas	(Colombia)	MF	27 March 1990 (aged 26)	Shakhter Karagandy	2014	127	16
97	Daulet Zainetdinov	(Kazakhstan)	MF	15 May 1997 (aged 19)	Academy	2016	1	0
98	Zhaslan Kairkenov	(Kazakhstan)	MF	27 March 2000 (aged 16)	Academy	2016	0	0
Forwards
10	Đorđe Despotović	(Serbia)	FW	4 March 1992 (aged 24)	Red Star Belgrade	2016	47	13
17	Tanat Nusserbayev	(Kazakhstan)	FW	1 January 1987 (aged 29)	Ordabasy	2011	197	54
23	Patrick Twumasi	(Ghana)	FW	9 May 1994 (aged 22)	Spartaks Jūrmala	2015	109	38
30	Junior Kabananga	(Democratic Republic of the Congo)	FW	4 April 1989 (aged 27)	Cercle Brugge	2015	52	15
45	Victor Pron	(Kazakhstan)	FW	23 September 1997 (aged 19)	Academy	2015	0	0
80	Vladislav Prokopenko	(Kazakhstan)	FW	1 July 2000 (aged 16)	Academy	2016	0	0
89	Lev Skvortsov	(Kazakhstan)	FW	2 February 2000 (aged 16)	Academy	2016	0	0
Players away on loan
11	Aleksey Shchotkin	(Kazakhstan)	FW	21 May 1991 (aged 25)	Taraz	2015	50	4
21	Berik Shaikhov	(Kazakhstan)	DF	20 February 1994 (aged 22)	Zhetysu	2015	4	0
44	Yevgeny Postnikov	(Russia)	DF	16 April 1986 (aged 30)	Shakhtyor Soligorsk	2014	88	1
85	Vladimir Loginovsky	(Kazakhstan)	GK	8 October 1985 (aged 31)	Zhetysu	2013	27	0
Players that left during the season
4	Mark Gorman	(Kazakhstan)	DF	9 February 1989 (aged 27)	Kairat	2016	25	0
16	Besart Abdurahimi	(North Macedonia)	MF	31 July 1990 (aged 26)	loan from Lokeren	2016	6	0
20	Lukman Haruna	(Nigeria)	MF	4 December 1990 (aged 26)	Dynamo Kyiv	2016	12	1

== Transfers ==
=== Winter ===
In: Note: Flags indicate national team as defined under FIFA eligibility rules; some limited exceptions apply. Players may hold more than one non-FIFA nationality.

No.	Pos.	Nation	Player
3	DF	KAZ	Mark Gorman (from (Kazakhstan) Kairat)
8	MF	KAZ	Askhat Tagybergen (from (Kazakhstan) Aktobe)
10	FW	SRB	Đorđe Despotović (from (Serbia) Red Star Belgrade)
12	MF	KAZ	Gevorg Najaryan
13	DF	KAZ	Berik Shaikhov (from (Kazakhstan) Irtysh Pavlodar)
16	MF	MKD	Besart Abdurahimi (loan from (Belgium) Lokeren)
20	MF	NGR	Lukman Haruna (loan from (Ukraine) Dynamo Kyiv)
27	DF	KAZ	Yuriy Logvinenko (from (Kazakhstan) Aktobe)
35	GK	KAZ	Aleksandr Mokin (from (Kazakhstan) Shakhter Karagandy)
47	GK	KAZ	Abylaikhan Duysen (from (Kazakhstan) Bayterek)

Out: Note: Flags indicate national team as defined under FIFA eligibility rules; some limited exceptions apply. Players may hold more than one non-FIFA nationality.

No.	Pos.	Nation	Player
2	DF	KAZ	Yeldos Akhmetov (to (Kazakhstan) Irtysh Pavlodar)
8	MF	KAZ	Georgy Zhukov (loan return to (Belgium) Standard Liège)
10	MF	CAF	Foxi Kéthévoama (to (Turkey) Gaziantep B.B.)
12	DF	KAZ	Igor Pikalkin (to (Kazakhstan) Shakhter Karagandy)
19	MF	KAZ	Alexei Rodionov
20	MF	KAZ	Zhakyp Kozhamberdi (to (Kazakhstan) Okzhetpes)
22	FW	KAZ	Bauyrzhan Dzholchiyev
24	MF	UKR	Denys Dedechko (to (Ukraine) Oleksandriya)
26	FW	KAZ	Adil Balgabayev
29	FW	KAZ	Daulet Esbergenov
31	MF	KAZ	Islambek Kulekenov (to (Kazakhstan) Aktobe)
33	DF	SLO	Branko Ilić (to (Japan) Urawa Red Diamonds)
34	DF	KAZ	Adil Zhakipbaev
35	GK	KAZ	Aleksandr Konochkin
36	DF	KAZ	Erbol Zhaylaubekov
38	MF	KAZ	Zholaman Tabigat
42	DF	KAZ	Abilkair Ismailov
46	MF	KAZ	Madiyar Mukametzhanov
49	GK	KAZ	Dastan Dulatov
50	DF	KAZ	Ayhan Kozhabekov
51	MF	KAZ	Alexander Sharifullin
54	MF	KAZ	Aizat Bersembaev
57	DF	KAZ	Sanjar Umurzakov
66	MF	KAZ	Temirlanali Begimbay
69	FW	KAZ	Igor Aspendikov
80	MF	KAZ	Kuat Seksimbayev
89	FW	COD	Junior Kabananga (loan to (Turkey) Kardemir Karabükspor)
85	GK	KAZ	Vladimir Loginovsky (loan to (Kazakhstan) Tobol)
95	MF	KAZ	Madi Zamataev
99	MF	KAZ	Islam Akhmetov
—	MF	KAZ	Rinat Khayrullin (to (Latvia) Spartaks Jūrmala)
—	MF	KAZ	Ulan Konysbayev (to (Kazakhstan) Atyrau, previously on loan to (Kazakhstan) Kairat)
—	MF	KAZ	Toktar Zhangylyshbay (to (Kazakhstan) Aktobe, previously on loan to (Kazakhstan) Kairat)

=== Summer ===
In: Note: Flags indicate national team as defined under FIFA eligibility rules; some limited exceptions apply. Players may hold more than one non-FIFA nationality.

No.	Pos.	Nation	Player
9	MF	MKD	Agim Ibraimi (from (Slovenia) Maribor)
13	MF	KAZ	Azat Nurgaliev (loan from (Kazakhstan) Ordabasy)
14	DF	BLR	Igor Shitov (from (Russia) Mordovia Saransk)
22	DF	KAZ	Konstantin Engel (from (Germany) Ingolstadt 04)
25	DF	KAZ	Serhiy Malyi (from (Kazakhstan) Irtysh Pavlodar)
30	FW	COD	Junior Kabananga (loan return from (Turkey) Kardemir Karabükspor)

Out: Note: Flags indicate national team as defined under FIFA eligibility rules; some limited exceptions apply. Players may hold more than one non-FIFA nationality.

No.	Pos.	Nation	Player
4	DF	KAZ	Mark Gorman (to (Kazakhstan) Tobol)
11	FW	KAZ	Aleksey Shchotkin (loan to (Kazakhstan) Aktobe)
16	MF	MKD	Besart Abdurahimi (loan return to (Belgium) Lokeren)
20	MF	NGR	Lukman Haruna (loan return to (Ukraine) Dynamo Kyiv)
21	DF	KAZ	Berik Shaikhov (loan to (Kazakhstan) Zhetysu)
44	DF	RUS	Yevgeny Postnikov (loan to (Latvia) Ventspils)

== Friendlies ==
27 January 2016	Astana (Kazakhstan)	0 – 5	(Russia) Spartak Moscow	Abu Dhabi, United Arab Emirates
(UTC+6)		Report	Luís 55', 72'; Promes 79'; Popov 81'; Zuyev 85'	Stadium: Sheikh Zayed Sports Center; Referee: A. Al-Saadi Oman

6 February 2016	Astana (Kazakhstan)	1 – 1	(Ukraine) Zorya Luhansk	Belek Turkey
21:00 (UTC+6)	Despotović 72'	Report	Y.Kvasov 83'

9 February 2016	Astana (Kazakhstan)	3 – 0	(Bulgaria) Slavia Sofia	Belek Turkey
21:00 (UTC+6)	Despotović 7'; Twumasi 25'; Najaryan	Report

12 February 2016	Astana (Kazakhstan)	3 – 2	(Bosnia and Herzegovina) Sarajevo	Belek Turkey
(UTC+6)	Shchotkin 57'; Cañas 62'; Despotović 87'	Report	Benko 45'; Okić 49'

19 February 2016	Astana (Kazakhstan)	2 – 0	(Slovenia) Maribor	Belek Turkey
21:00 (UTC+6)	Muzhikov 12'; Despotović 24'	Report

18 February 2016	Astana (Kazakhstan)	3 – 6	(Ukraine) Olimpik Donetsk	Belek Turkey
(UTC+6)	Nusserbayev; Aničić; Twumasi 71' (pen.)	Report	13'; 15'

21 February 2016	Astana (Kazakhstan)	1 – 1	(Ukraine) Karpaty Lviv	Belek Turkey
(UTC+6)	Despotović 14'	Report	Kadymyan 31'

4 March 2016	Astana	5 – 1	Irtysh Pavlodar	Astana
15:00 (UTC+6)	Shchotkin; Maksimović; Twumasi; Despotović		Fonseca	Stadium: Astana Arena

4 December 2016	Baden (Switzerland)	0 – 7	(Kazakhstan) Astana	Fislisbach, Switzerland
(UTC+6)			Nurgaliev 10'; Kabananga 18', 35'; Murtazayev 47'; Twumasi 60'; Despotović 77'	Stadium: Esp Stadium

== Competitions ==
=== Kazakhstan Super Cup ===
8 March 2016	Astana	0 – 0 (a.e.t.) (4 – 5 p)	Kairat	Astana
15:00 (UTC+6)	Cañas (yellow card) 46'; Twumasi (yellow card) 69'	Report	Marković (yellow card) 22'; Tesák (yellow card) 90'; Tymoshchuk (yellow card) 103'; Gohou (yellow card) 106'	Stadium: Astana Arena; Attendance: 14,500; Referee: Ravshan Irmatov
	Penalties
	Cañas (penalty scored); Aničić (penalty scored); Shchotkin (penalty missed); Maksimović (penalty missed); Twumasi (penalty scored); Beisebekov (penalty scored); Postnikov (penalty missed)		(penalty scored) Islamkhan; (penalty scored) Soares; (penalty scored) Riera; (penalty missed) V.Li; (penalty missed) Gohou; (penalty scored) Tymoshchuk; (penalty scored) Tesák

=== Premier League ===
==== Regular season ====
===== Results summary =====
Overall								Home						Away					
Pld	W	D	L	GF	GA	GD	Pts	W	D	L	GF	GA	GD	W	D	L	GF	GA	GD
22	17	2	3	34	14	+20	53	10	1	0	17	5	+12	7	1	3	17	9	+8

Last updated: 8 August 2016.
Source: See Results

===== Results by round =====
Round	1	2	3	4	5	6	7	8	9	10	11	12	13	14	15	16	17	18	19	20	21	22
Ground	H	A	H	H	A	H	A	H	A	H	A	H	A	H	H	A	H	A	H	A	H	A
Result	W	W	W	W	W	W	D	W	W	W	L	W	W	W	W	W	D	L	W	W	W	L
Position	2	2	2	2	2	1	1	1	1	1	1	1	1	1	1	1	1	1	1	1	1	1

Source: See Results
A = Away; H = Home; W = Win; D = Draw; L = Loss

===== Results =====
12 March 2016 1	Astana	2 – 1	Shakhter Karagandy	Astana
16:00 (UTC+6)	Despotović 47'; Nusserbayev 65'	Report	D.Ubbink 7'; Baizhanov (yellow card) 61'	Stadium: Astana Arena; Attendance: 5,000; Referee: Bagdat Abdullaev

20 March 2016 2	Ordabasy	1 – 3	Astana	Shymkent
15:00 (UTC+6)	Junuzović 15'; Kasalica (yellow card) 48'; Mukhtarov (yellow card) 73' (yellow-red card) 90+5'; E.Tungyshbaev (yellow card) 73'	Report	Despotović 11'; Simčević 43' (o.g.); Aničić 45'; Postnikov (yellow card) 58'; Muzhikov (yellow card) 73' (yellow-red card) 89'	Stadium: Kazhymukan Munaitpasov Stadium; Attendance: 9,000; Referee: Bolat Karlibayev

3 April 2016 3	Astana	1 – 0	Aktobe	Astana
16:00 (UTC+6)	Shomko (yellow card) 59'; Twumasi 83'	Report	Zhangylyshbay (yellow card) 27'; B.Kairov (yellow card) 44'	Stadium: Astana Arena; Attendance: 7,500; Referee: Askhat Abdanbayev

9 April 2016 4	Astana	2 – 1	Taraz	Astana
15:00 (UTC+6)	Nusserbayev 21'; Shomko 81'; Cañas (yellow card) 90+2'	Report	Zyankovich 48'; D.Bayaliev (yellow card) 56'; K.Karaman (yellow card) 70'	Stadium: Astana Arena; Attendance: 2,358; Referee: Denis Tevyashov

13 April 2016 5	Zhetysu	0 – 1	Astana	Taldykorgan
16:00 (UTC+6)	T.Adilkhanov (yellow card) 76'; Turysbek (yellow card) 83'; Simonovski (yellow card) 86'; Kadio (yellow card) 90+4'	Report	Despotović (yellow card) 67'; Logvinenko 78'; Shchotkin (yellow card) 88' (yellow-red card) 89'; Muzhikov (yellow card) 90+4'	Stadium: Zhetysu Stadium; Attendance: 1,700; Referee: Daniyar Sakhi

17 April 2016 6	Astana	1 – 0	Tobol	Astana
16:00 (UTC+6)	Haruna 32'; Shomko (yellow card) 76'; Logvinenko (yellow card) 89'	Report	Y.Levin (yellow card) 24'; Šimkovič (yellow card) 32'; D.Miroshnichenko (yellow card) 61'; R.Jalilov (yellow card) 74'	Stadium: Astana Arena; Attendance: 3,500; Referee: Aydin Rakhimbayev

23 April 2016 7	Irtysh Pavlodar	2 – 2	Astana	Pavlodar
18:00 (UTC+6)	Akhmetov 2'; Fonseca 60'; Freidgeimas (yellow card) 81'; Kerla (yellow card) 87'; Gogua (yellow card) 90+2'	Report	Despotović 7'; Muzhikov 31'; Cañas (yellow card) 44'; Beisebekov (yellow card) 46'	Stadium: Central Stadium; Attendance: 9,200; Referee: Anatolyi Vishnichenko

1 May 2016 8	Astana	1 – 0	Kairat	Astana
15:00 (UTC+6)	Maksimović 6'; Shomko (yellow card) 29'; Muzhikov (yellow card) 43'; Despotović (yellow card) 82'; Haruna (yellow card) 90+2'	Report	Tesák (yellow card) 47'	Stadium: Astana Arena; Attendance: 11,000; Referee: Igor Chesnokov

5 May 2016 9	Okzhetpes	0 – 1	Astana	Shchuchinsk
17:00 (UTC+6)	Nane (yellow card) 66'	Report	Despotović 74'	Stadium: Zhaksy Stadium; Attendance: 500; Referee: Artyom Kuchin

10 May 2016 10	Astana	2 – 0	Akzhayik	Astana
16:00 (UTC+6)	Nusserbayev 45'; Twumasi 48'	Report		Stadium: Astana Arena; Attendance: 2,500; Referee: Viktor Antonov

15 May 2016 11	Atyrau	1 – 0	Astana	Atyrau
18:00 (UTC+6)	A.Saparov 22' (yellow card) 77'; Arzhanov (yellow card) 34'; V.Kuzmin (yellow card) 85'; Curtean (yellow card) 90+1'	Report	Muzhikov (yellow card) 14'	Stadium: Munaishy Stadium; Attendance: 3,000; Referee: Denis Izmailov

21 May 2016 12	Astana	3 – 1	Ordabasy	Astana
17:00 (UTC+6)	Aničić 7'; Cañas 21'; Nusserbayev 72'; Tagybergen (yellow card) 90'	Report	G.Suyumbaev (yellow card) 6'; Simčević 10'	Stadium: Astana Arena; Attendance: 1,700; Referee: Ruslan Duzmambetov

29 May 2016 13	Aktobe	0 – 1	Astana	Aktobe
20:00 (UTC+6)	Bocharov (yellow card) 22'	Report	Postnikov (yellow card) 38'; Maksimović 83'; Shchotkin (yellow card) 89'	Stadium: Central Stadium; Attendance: 8,000; Referee: Aleksandr Aliyev

2 June 2016 14	Taraz	0 – 2	Astana	Taraz
17:00 (UTC+6)	M.Nuraly (yellow card) 39'; V.Yevstigneyev (yellow card) 73'	Report	Postnikov (yellow card) 12'; Shomko (yellow card) 39'; Aničić (yellow card) 77'; Despotović 88'; Muzhikov 90'	Stadium: Central Stadium; Attendance: 3,500; Referee: Artyom Kuchin

11 June 2016 15	Astana	1 – 0	Zhetysu	Astana
16:00 (UTC+6)	Beisebekov (yellow card) 17' (yellow-red card) 65'; Nusserbayev 45'; Cañas (yellow card) 64'; Shchotkin (yellow card) 90+3'	Report	Klein (yellow card) 39'; Simonovski (yellow card) 65'	Stadium: Astana Arena; Attendance: 2,000; Referee: Anatolyi Vishnichenko

15 June 2016 16	Tobol	1 – 2	Astana	Kostanay
19:00 (UTC+6)	Y.Levin 45+1' (yellow card) 54'; Asildarov (yellow card) 82'	Report	Maksimović 17'; Tagybergen 58'; Twumasi (yellow card) 78'; Haruna (yellow card) 79'; Nusserbayev (yellow card) 82'	Stadium: Central Stadium; Attendance: 3,000; Referee: Aydin Rakhimbayev

19 June 2016 17	Astana	1 – 1	Irtysh Pavlodar	Astana
15:00 (UTC+6)	Twumasi (yellow card) 37'; Nusserbayev (yellow card) 50' (goal) 51'	Report	Jallow (yellow card) 36'; Kerla (yellow card) 59' (goal) 69'; R.Murtazayev (yellow card) 86'; Loria (yellow card) 90'	Stadium: Astana Arena; Attendance: 7,500; Referee: Sergey Gorokhovodatskiy

23 June 2016 18	Kairat	1 – 0	Astana	Almaty
20:00 (UTC+6)	Muzhikov (yellow card) 23'; Postnikov (yellow card) 68'	Report	Gohou 11'; Arshavin (yellow card) 45+3'; Marković (yellow card) 81'	Stadium: Central Stadium; Attendance: 19,000; Referee: Ruslan Duzmambetov

5 July 2016 19	Astana	1 – 0	Okzhetpes	Astana
19:00 (UTC+6)	Nusserbayev (yellow card) 22'; Nurgaliev (yellow card) 38'; Logvinenko (yellow card) 60'; Kabananga 86'; Cañas (yellow card) 90+3'	Report	Chichulin (yellow card) 24'; Khairullin (yellow card) 53'	Stadium: Astana Arena; Attendance: 3,500; Referee: Artyom Kuchin

8 July 2016 20	Akzhayik	1 – 5	Astana	Oral
20:00 (UTC+6)	Govedarica 20' (yellow card) 45+2'; Dudchenko (yellow card) 54'	Report	Nurgaliev 2', 90+1'; Kabananga 22'; Tagybergen 44'; Muzhikov 64'	Stadium: Petr Atoyan Stadium; Attendance: 3,000; Referee: Igor Aleshin

16 July 2016 21	Astana	2 – 1	Atyrau	Astana
17:00 (UTC+6)	Nurgaliev 20', 39'; Muzhikov (yellow card) 71'; Cañas (yellow card) 90'	Report	Arzhanov 7'; A.Saparov (yellow card) 86'	Stadium: Astana Arena; Attendance: 3,000; Referee: Askhat Abdanbayev

7 August 2016 22	Shakhter Karagandy	2 – 0	Astana	Karaganda
17:00 (UTC+6)	Simonovski (yellow card) 57'; Vasiljević 67'; Y.Goryachi 87' (yellow card) 87'	Report	Muzhikov (yellow card) 33'; Malyi (yellow card) 50'; Logvinenko (yellow card) 51'; Shomko (yellow card) 88'	Stadium: Shakhter Stadium; Attendance: 2,500; Referee: Aleksandr Gauzer

===== League table =====
Pos	Team	Pld	W	D	L	GF	GA	GD	Pts	Qualification
1	Astana	22	17	2	3	34	14	+20	53	Qualification for the championship round
2	Kairat	22	14	4	4	50	22	+28	46	Qualification for the championship round
3	Irtysh Pavlodar	22	12	5	5	37	18	+19	41	Qualification for the championship round
4	Okzhetpes	22	11	4	7	33	23	+10	37	Qualification for the championship round
5	Ordabasy	22	9	6	7	26	27	−1	33	Qualification for the championship round

Source: UEFA.com, Soccerway
Rules for classification: 1) Points; 2) Head-to-head points; 3) Head-to-head matches won; 4) Head-to-head goal difference; 5) Head-to-head goals scored; 6) Head-to-head away goals scored; 7) Goal difference; 8) Matches won; 9) Goals scored; 10) Away goals scored; 11) Draw.

==== Championship round ====
===== Results summary =====
Overall								Home						Away					
Pld	W	D	L	GF	GA	GD	Pts	W	D	L	GF	GA	GD	W	D	L	GF	GA	GD
10	6	2	2	13	7	+6	20	4	0	1	10	4	+6	2	2	1	3	3	0

Last updated: 31 October 2016.
Source: See Results

===== Results by round =====
Round	1	2	3	4	5	6	7	8	9	10
Ground	H	H	H	A	A	H	A	H	A	A
Result	W	W	L	W	W	W	L	W	D	D
Position	1	1	1	1	1	1	1	1	1	1

Source: See Results
A = Away; H = Home; W = Win; D = Draw; L = Loss

===== Results =====
11 August 2016 1	Astana	3 – 0	Irtysh Pavlodar	Astana
16:00 (UTC+6)	Logvinenko 11' (yellow card) 90+4'; Kabananga 32'; Despotović 90'	Report	Kerla (yellow card) 36'; Fonseca (yellow card) 90+4'	Stadium: Astana Arena; Attendance: 2,000; Referee: Denis Izmailov

21 August 2016 2	Astana	2 – 0	Ordabasy	Astana
19:00 (UTC+6)	Nurgaliev 2' (pen.); Twumasi 50'; Shitov (yellow card) 51'	Report	Diakate (yellow card) 65'; Smakov (yellow card) 87'; Trajković (yellow card) 89'	Stadium: Astana Arena; Attendance: 3,000; Referee: Denis Tevyashov

26 August 2016 3	Okzhetpes	Postponed	Astana	Kokshetau
(UTC+6)				Stadium: Okzhetpes Stadium

10 September 2016 4	Astana	1 – 4	Kairat	Astana
17:00 (UTC+6)	Nurgaliev (yellow card) 54'; Aničić (yellow card) 59'; Despotović 71' (yellow card) 87'; Nusserbayev (yellow card) 74'	Report	Acevedo 5'; Islamkhan 62'; Gohou 68'; Arshavin 76'; G.Suyumbayev (yellow card) 90+2'	Stadium: Astana Arena; Attendance: 6,000; Referee: Ruslan Duzmambetov

18 September 2016 5	Aktobe	1 – 2	Astana	Aktobe
20:00 (UTC+6)	Sorokin 66'; S.Otarbayev (yellow card) 88'; Nikolić (yellow card) 90+1'	Report	Kabananga 11'; Tagybergen (yellow card) 62'; Aničić 87'	Stadium: Central Stadium; Attendance: 7,000; Referee: Denis Izmailov

25 September 2016 6	Ordabasy	0 – 1	Astana	Shymkent
16:00 (UTC+6)	Smakov (yellow card) 69' (yellow-red card) 70'; Simčević (yellow card) 71'; Diakate (yellow card) 72'	Report	Kabananga 44' (yellow card) 78'; Beisebekov (yellow card) 75'; Maksimović (yellow card) 79'	Stadium: Kazhymukan Munaitpasov Stadium; Attendance: 5,500; Referee: Igor Aleshin

2 October 2016 7	Astana	3 – 0	Okzhetpes	Astana
19:00 (UTC+6)	Twumasi 2', 89'; Logvinenko (yellow card) 45'; Nurgaliev 56'	Report	Yurin (yellow card) 61'; Kozhamberdi (yellow card) 64'	Stadium: Astana Arena; Attendance: 2,200; Referee: Askhat Abdanbayev

16 October 2016 8	Kairat	2 – 0	Astana	Almaty
18:00 (UTC+6)	Kuat (yellow card) 13' (goal) 35'; Arzo 29'; Marković 58'	Report	Tagybergen (yellow card) 22'; Nurgaliev (yellow card) 25'; Malyi (yellow card) 72'	Stadium: Central Stadium; Attendance: 17,500; Referee: Ruslan Duzmambetov

23 October 2016 9	Astana	1 – 0	Aktobe	Astana
15:00 (UTC+6)	Despotović 12'	Report	Tsveiba (yellow card) 29'; Kouadja (yellow card) 58'; Sorokin (yellow card) 78' (yellow-red card) 89'	Stadium: Astana Arena; Attendance: 5,500; Referee: Aleksandr Gauzer

26 October 2016 3	Okzhetpes	0 – 0	Astana	Kokshetau
15:00 (UTC+6)		Report	Logvinenko (yellow card) 67'	Stadium: Okzhetpes Stadium; Referee: Igor Chesnokov

29 October 2016 10	Irtysh Pavlodar	0 – 0	Astana	Pavlodar
17:00 (UTC+6)	Kerla (yellow card) 45'; A.Ayaganov (yellow card) 51'	Report	Malyi (yellow card) 28'; A.Zhunussov (yellow card) 38' (yellow-red card) 85'; Nusserbayev (yellow card) 70'	Stadium: Central Stadium; Attendance: 3,500; Referee: Denis Tevyashov

===== League table =====
Pos	Team	Pld	W	D	L	GF	GA	GD	Pts	Qualification
1	Astana (C)	32	23	4	5	47	21	+26	73	Qualification for the Champions League second qualifying round (Note: Astana qualified for the Europa League first qualifying round by winning the 2016 Kazakhstan Cup. However, since they already qualified for European competition based on their league position, the spot awarded to the cup winners was passed down the league.)
2	Kairat	32	22	5	5	75	30	+45	71	Qualification for the Europa League first qualifying round
3	Irtysh Pavlodar	32	14	7	11	52	36	+16	49	Qualification for the Europa League first qualifying round
4	Ordabasy	32	13	9	10	41	44	−3	48	Qualification for the Europa League first qualifying round
5	Okzhetpes	32	13	6	13	42	44	−2	45	
6	Aktobe	32	9	9	14	37	52	−15	36	

Source: Soccerway
Rules for classification: 1) Points; 2) Play-off (only if deciding champion when two teams are tied); 3) Head-to-head points; 4) Head-to-head matches won; 5) Head-to-head goal difference; 6) Head-to-head goals scored; 7) Head-to-head away goals scored; 8) Goal difference; 9) Matches won; 10) Goals scored; 11) Away goals scored; 12) Draw.
(C) Champions

=== Kazakhstan Cup ===
27 April 2016 Last 16	Astana	1 – 0	Caspiy	Astana
16:00 (UTC+6)	B.Kulbekov (yellow card) 13'; Nusserbayev 90'	Report	R.Zhanysbayev (yellow card) 50'; A.Kyzyltaev (yellow card) 53'	Stadium: Astana Arena; Attendance: 500; Referee: Ruslan Omarov

25 May 2016 Quarterfinal	Kyzylzhar	2 – 3	Astana	Petropavl
18:00 (UTC+6)	A.Burtsev 69'; Stupić 80'; Hichri (yellow card) 90'	Report	Despotović 33', 65'; B.Shaikhov (yellow card) 63'; Tagybergen 73'	Stadium: Avangard Stadium; Attendance: 9,000; Referee: Bolat Karlibayev

21 September 2016 Semifinal 1st leg	Irtysh Pavlodar	1 – 2	Astana	Pavlodar
19:00 (UTC+6)	Murtazayev 33'	Report	Tagybergen 23'; Nusserbayev 37' (yellow card) 71'; Nurgaliev (yellow card) 89'; D.Zainetdinov (yellow card) 90+3'	Stadium: Central Stadium; Attendance: 5,500; Referee: Igor Chesnokov

6 November 2016 Semifinal 2nd leg	Astana	5 – 3 (7 – 4 agg.)	Irtysh Pavlodar	Astana
15:00 (UTC+6)	Despotović 19'; A.Aliyev (yellow card) 27'; Kabananga 35', 62'; B.Kulbekov (yellow card) 70'; Malyi 84'; Cañas 90+2'	Report	A.Smailov 37', 48'; Fonseca 45'; R.Bogdanov (yellow card) 57'; M.Ramazanov (yellow card) 83'	Stadium: Astana Arena; Attendance: 2,200; Referee: Denis Izmailov

==== Final ====
19 November 2016	Kairat	0 – 1	Astana	Almaty
15:00 (UTC+6)	Marković (yellow card) 90+5'	Report	Kabananga 47'	Stadium: Central Stadium; Referee: Ruslan Duzmambetov

=== UEFA Champions League ===
==== Qualifying rounds ====
13 July 2016 Second qualifying round 1st leg	Žalgiris Vilnius (Lithuania)	0 – 0	(Kazakhstan) Astana	Vilnius, Lithuania
23:15 (UTC+6)	Ljujić (yellow card) 71'	Report	Kabananga (yellow card) 85'	Stadium: LFF Stadium; Attendance: 4,100; Referee: Vlado Glođović (Serbia)

20 July 2016 Second qualifying round 2nd leg	Astana (Kazakhstan)	2 – 1 (2 – 1 agg.)	(Lithuania) Žalgiris Vilnius	Astana, Kazakhstan
20:00 (UTC+6)	Aničić 31', 90+3' (yellow card) 90+3'; Muzhikov (yellow card) 65'; Shomko (yellow card) 80'	Report	Kuklys (yellow card) 31'; Klimavičius (yellow card) 42'; Elivelto 57'	Stadium: Astana Arena; Attendance: 18,449; Referee: Sandro Schärer (Switzerland)

27 July 2016 Third qualifying round 1st leg	Astana (Kazakhstan)	1 – 1	(Scotland) Celtic	Astana, Kazakhstan
20:00 (UTC+6)	Logvinenko 19'; Nurgaliev (yellow card) 28'; Ibraimi (yellow card) 90+6'	Report	Griffiths (yellow card) 76' (goal) 78'; Brown (yellow card) 90+6'	Stadium: Astana Arena; Attendance: 29,000; Referee: Paolo Mazzoleni (Italy)

4 August 2016 Third qualifying round 2nd leg	(Scotland) Celtic	2 – 1 (3 – 2 agg.)	(Kazakhstan) Astana	Glasgow, Scotland
00:45 (UTC+6)	Griffiths 45+2' (pen.); Johansen (yellow card) 58'; O'Connell (yellow card) 76'; Dembélé 90+2' (pen.)	Report	Shitov (yellow card) 21' (yellow-red card) 90+1'; Shomko (yellow card) 45+2' (yellow-red card) 90+2'; Kabananga (yellow card) 45+3'; Ibraimi 62' (yellow card) 90+1'; Muzhikov (yellow card) 67'; Erić (yellow card) 89'; Cañas (yellow card) 90+1'	Stadium: Celtic Park; Referee: István Kovács (Romania)

=== UEFA Europa League ===
==== Qualifying rounds ====
18 August 2016 Play-off round 2nd leg	Astana (Kazakhstan)	2 – 0	(Belarus) BATE Borisov	Astana, Kazakhstan
20:00 (UTC+6)	Beisebekov (yellow card) 47'; Kabananga 70'; Aničić (yellow card) 79'; Nurgaliev 80' (yellow card) 90+6'; Tagybergen (yellow card) 89'	Report		Stadium: Astana Arena; Attendance: 17,536; Referee: Sébastien Delferière (Belgium)

26 August 2016 Play-off round 2nd leg	BATE Borisov (Belarus)	2 – 2 (2 – 4 agg.)	(Kazakhstan) Astana	Barysaw, Belarus
01:00 (UTC+6)	Gordeichuk 27'; Rodionov (yellow card) 49'; Kendysh (yellow card) 76'; Stasevich (yellow card) 82' (goal) 90' (pen.); Rios (red card) 83'	Report	Maksimović (yellow card) 35' (goal) 50'; Mokin (yellow card) 72'; Twumasi 76'; Muzhikov (yellow card) 86'; Shomko (yellow card) 90+3'	Stadium: Borisov Arena; Attendance: 9,516; Referee: Tony Chapron (France)

==== Group stage ====
Pos	Team	Pld	W	D	L	GF	GA	GD	Pts	Qualification	APO	OLY	YB	AST
1	(Cyprus) APOEL	6	4	0	2	8	6	+2	12	Advance to knockout phase	—	2–0	1–0	2–1
2	(Greece) Olympiacos	6	2	2	2	7	6	+1	8	Advance to knockout phase	0–1	—	1–1	4–1
3	(Switzerland) Young Boys	6	2	2	2	7	4	+3	8		3–1	0–1	—	3–0
4	(Kazakhstan) Astana	6	1	2	3	5	11	−6	5		2–1	1–1	0–0	—

Source: UEFA

15 September 2016 1	APOEL (Cyprus)	2 – 1	(Kazakhstan) Astana	Nicosia, Cyprus
23:00 (UTC+6)	Morais (yellow card) 60'; Vinícius (yellow card) 63' (goal) 75' de Camargo 87'; Vander (yellow card) 90+4'	Report	Cañas (yellow card) 29'; Shomko (yellow card) 33'; Maksimović 45+1'; Twumasi (yellow card) 66'; Muzhikov (yellow card) 72'; Tagybergen (yellow card) 85'; Shitov (yellow card) 90+1'	Stadium: GSP Stadium; Attendance: 12,008; Referee: Aleksandar Stavrev (Macedonia)

29 September 2016 2	Astana (Kazakhstan)	0 – 0	(Switzerland) Young Boys	Astana, Kazakhstan
21:00 (UTC+6)		Report	Nuhu (yellow card) 30'; Sutter (yellow card) 73'	Stadium: Astana Arena; Attendance: 21,328; Referee: Simon Lee Evans (Wales)

21 October 2016 3	Olympiacos (Greece)	4 – 1	(Kazakhstan) Astana	Piraeus Greece
01:05 (UTC+6)	Figueiras 25'; Botía (yellow card) 27'; Elyounoussi 33'; Sebá 34', 65'; Milivojević (yellow card) 72'	Report	Cañas (yellow card) 44' (yellow-red card) 58'; Kabananga 54' (yellow card) 60'; Tagybergen (yellow card) 48'; Shitov (yellow card) 77'; Muzhikov (yellow card) 80'; Twumasi (yellow card) 84'	Stadium: Karaiskakis Stadium; Attendance: 21,480; Referee: Tobias Stieler (Germany)

3 November 2016 4	Astana (Kazakhstan)	1 – 1	(Greece) Olympiacos	Astana, Kazakhstan
22:00 (UTC+6)	Despotović 8'; Twumasi (yellow card) 57'; Logvinenko (yellow card) 72'	Report	Sebá 30'; Bouchalakis (yellow card) 62'	Stadium: Astana Arena; Attendance: 12,158; Referee: Orel Grinfeeld (Israel)

24 November 2016 5	Astana (Kazakhstan)	2 – 1	(Cyprus) APOEL	Astana, Kazakhstan
22:00 (UTC+6)	Shomko (yellow card) 2'; Aničić 59' (yellow card) 89'; Despotović 84'; Maksimović (yellow card) 87'; Kabananga (yellow card) 90+4'	Report	Efrem 31'; Astiz (red card) 32'; Morais (yellow card) 75'	Stadium: Astana Arena; Attendance: 9,143; Referee: Kevin Blom (Netherlands)

9 December 2016 6	Young Boys (Switzerland)	3 – 0	(Kazakhstan) Astana	Bern, Switzerland
22:00 (UTC+6)	Frey 63'; Hoarau 66'; Schick 71'	Report		Stadium: Stade de Suisse; Referee: Clayton Pisani (Malta)

== Squad statistics ==
As of Match played 9 December 2016

=== Appearances and goals ===
No.	Pos	Nat	Player	Total		Premier League		Kazakhstan Cup		Super Cup		Champions League		Europa League	
No.	Pos	Nat	Player	Apps	Goals	Apps	Goals	Apps	Goals	Apps	Goals	Apps	Goals	Apps	Goals
1	GK	(Kazakhstan) KAZ	Nenad Erić	42	0	30	0	0	0	1	0	4	0	7	0
5	DF	(Bosnia and Herzegovina) BIH	Marin Aničić	40	6	27	3	1+1	0	1	0	4	2	6	1
6	MF	(Serbia) SRB	Nemanja Maksimović	43	5	28+3	3	1	0	1	0	3	0	7	2
7	MF	(Kazakhstan) KAZ	Serikzhan Muzhikov	44	3	26+1	3	2+2	0	1	0	2+2	0	7+1	0
8	MF	(Kazakhstan) KAZ	Askhat Tagybergen	35	4	9+17	2	3	2	0	0	0+1	0	1+4	0
9	MF	(North Macedonia) MKD	Agim Ibraimi	11	1	4+2	0	0	0	0	0	2+2	1	1	0
10	FW	(Serbia) SRB	Đorđe Despotović	47	13	21+10	8	2+2	3	1	0	0+4	0	5+2	2
12	MF	(Kazakhstan) KAZ	Gevorg Najaryan	6	0	1	0	4	0	0	0	0	0	0+1	0
13	MF	(Kazakhstan) KAZ	Azat Nurgaliev	18	7	10+1	6	1	0	0	0	2	0	1+3	1
14	DF	(Belarus) BLR	Igor Shitov	23	0	7+2	0	3	0	0	0	4	0	6+1	0
15	DF	(Kazakhstan) KAZ	Abzal Beisebekov	37	0	18+4	0	3	0	1	0	2+1	0	7+1	0
17	FW	(Kazakhstan) KAZ	Tanat Nusserbayev	35	8	18+7	6	1+2	2	1	0	2	0	1+3	0
23	FW	(Ghana) GHA	Patrick Twumasi	41	6	24+4	5	2	0	1	0	4	0	5+1	1
25	DF	(Kazakhstan) KAZ	Serhiy Malyi	18	1	7	0	2+1	1	0	0	0	0	5+3	0
27	DF	(Kazakhstan) KAZ	Yuriy Logvinenko	38	3	23+2	2	1+2	0	0	0	4	1	6	0
28	DF	(Kazakhstan) KAZ	Birzhan Kulbekov	6	0	1+1	0	3	0	0	0	0	0	0+1	0
30	FW	(Democratic Republic of the Congo) COD	Junior Kabananga	27	10	9+4	5	2	3	0	0	3+1	0	8	2
31	MF	(Kazakhstan) KAZ	Abay Zhunussov	5	0	1+1	0	2	0	0	0	0	0	0+1	0
35	GK	(Kazakhstan) KAZ	Aleksandr Mokin	8	0	2	0	5	0	0	0	0	0	1	0
37	MF	(Kazakhstan) KAZ	Amir Kalabayev	2	0	1	0	1	0	0	0	0	0	0	0
54	MF	(Kazakhstan) KAZ	Ardak Saulet	1	0	0	0	0+1	0	0	0	0	0	0	0
70	MF	(Kazakhstan) KAZ	Sultan Sagnayev	1	0	0	0	0+1	0	0	0	0	0	0	0
71	MF	(Kazakhstan) KAZ	Madi Zhakipbayev	4	0	1+1	0	1+1	0	0	0	0	0	0	0
77	DF	(Kazakhstan) KAZ	Dmitri Shomko	42	1	28+1	1	1	0	1	0	4	0	7	0
88	MF	(Colombia) COL	Roger Cañas	45	2	30+1	1	1+1	1	1	0	4	0	7	0
95	DF	(Kazakhstan) KAZ	Amanbol Aliyev	3	0	1	0	2	0	0	0	0	0	0	0
97	MF	(Kazakhstan) KAZ	Daulet Zainetdinov	1	0	0	0	0+1	0	0	0	0	0	0	0
Players away from Astana on loan:
11	FW	(Kazakhstan) KAZ	Aleksey Shchotkin	18	0	0+15	0	2	0	0+1	0	0	0	0	0
21	DF	(Kazakhstan) KAZ	Berik Shaikhov	3	0	0	0	2	0	0+1	0	0	0	0	0
44	DF	(Russia) RUS	Yevgeny Postnikov	18	0	16	0	1	0	1	0	0	0	0	0
Players who appeared for Astana that left during the season:
4	DF	(Kazakhstan) KAZ	Mark Gorman	9	0	2+4	0	2	0	0+1	0	0	0	0	0
16	MF	(North Macedonia) MKD	Besart Abdurahimi	6	0	1+3	0	2	0	0	0	0	0	0	0
20	MF	(Nigeria) NGR	Lukman Haruna	12	1	6+4	1	2	0	0	0	0	0	0	0

=== Goal scorers ===
Place	Position	Nation	Number	Name	Premier League	Kazakhstan Cup	Super Cup	Champions League	Europa League	Total
1	FW	(Serbia)	10	Đorđe Despotović	8	3	0	0	2	13
2	FW	(Democratic Republic of the Congo)	30	Junior Kabananga	5	3	0	0	2	10
3	FW	(Kazakhstan)	17	Tanat Nusserbayev	6	2	0	0	0	8
4	MF	(Kazakhstan)	13	Azat Nurgaliev	6	0	0	0	1	7
5	MF	(Ghana)	23	Patrick Twumasi	5	0	0	0	1	6
5	DF	(Bosnia and Herzegovina)	5	Marin Aničić	3	0	0	2	1	6
7	MF	(Serbia)	6	Nemanja Maksimović	3	0	0	0	2	5
8	MF	(Kazakhstan)	8	Askhat Tagybergen	2	2	0	0	0	4
9	MF	(Kazakhstan)	7	Serikzhan Muzhikov	3	0	0	0	0	3
9	DF	(Kazakhstan)	27	Yuriy Logvinenko	2	0	0	1	0	3
11	MF	(Colombia)	88	Roger Cañas	1	1	0	0	0	2
12	DF	(Kazakhstan)	77	Dmitri Shomko	1	0	0	0	0	1
12	MF	(Nigeria)	20	Lukman Haruna	1	0	0	0	0	1
12	MF	(North Macedonia)	9	Agim Ibraimi	0	0	0	1	0	1
12	DF	(Kazakhstan)	25	Serhiy Malyi	0	1	0	0	0	1
12				Own goal	1	0	0	0	0	1
				TOTALS	47	12	0	4	9	72

=== Clean sheets ===
Place	Position	Nation	Number	Name	Premier League	Kazakhstan Cup	Super Cup	Champions League	Europa League	Total
1	GK	(Kazakhstan)	1	Nenad Erić	15	0	1	1	2	19
2	GK	(Kazakhstan)	35	Aleksandr Mokin	2	2	0	0	0	4
				TOTALS	17	2	1	1	2	23

=== Disciplinary record ===
Number	Nation	Position	Name	Premier League		Kazakhstan Cup		Super Cup		Champions League		Europa League		Total	
Number	Nation	Position	Name	Yellow card	Red card	Yellow card	Red card	Yellow card	Red card	Yellow card	Red card	Yellow card	Red card	Yellow card	Red card
1	(Kazakhstan)	GK	Nenad Erić	0	0	0	0	0	0	1	0	0	0	1	0
5	(Bosnia and Herzegovina)	DF	Marin Aničić	2	0	0	0	0	0	1	0	2	0	5	0
6	(Serbia)	MF	Nemanja Maksimović	1	0	0	0	0	0	0	0	2	0	3	0
7	(Kazakhstan)	MF	Serikzhan Muzhikov	8	1	0	0	0	0	2	0	3	0	13	1
8	(Kazakhstan)	MF	Askhat Tagybergen	2	0	0	0	0	0	0	0	3	0	5	0
9	(North Macedonia)	MF	Agim Ibraimi	0	0	0	0	0	0	2	0	0	0	2	0
10	(Serbia)	FW	Đorđe Despotović	3	0	0	0	0	0	0	0	0	0	3	0
13	(Kazakhstan)	MF	Azat Nurgaliev	3	0	1	0	0	0	1	0	1	0	6	0
14	(Belarus)	DF	Igor Shitov	1	0	0	0	0	0	2	1	2	0	5	1
15	(Kazakhstan)	DF	Abzal Beisebekov	5	1	0	0	0	0	0	0	1	0	6	1
17	(Kazakhstan)	FW	Tanat Nusserbayev	5	0	1	0	0	0	0	0	0	0	6	0
23	(Ghana)	FW	Patrick Twumasi	2	0	0	0	1	0	0	0	3	0	6	0
25	(Kazakhstan)	DF	Serhiy Malyi	3	0	0	0	0	0	0	0	0	0	3	0
27	(Kazakhstan)	DF	Yuriy Logvinenko	5	0	1	0	0	0	0	0	1	0	7	0
28	(Kazakhstan)	DF	Birzhan Kulbekov	0	0	2	0	0	0	0	0	0	0	2	0
30	(Democratic Republic of the Congo)	FW	Junior Kabananga	1	0	0	0	0	0	2	0	2	0	5	0
31	(Kazakhstan)	MF	Abay Zhunussov	2	1	0	0	0	0	0	0	0	0	2	1
35	(Kazakhstan)	GK	Aleksandr Mokin	0	0	0	0	0	0	0	0	1	0	1	0
77	(Kazakhstan)	DF	Dmitri Shomko	5	0	0	0	0	0	3	1	3	0	11	1
88	(Colombia)	MF	Roger Cañas	5	0	0	0	1	0	1	0	3	1	10	1
95	(Kazakhstan)	DF	Amanbol Aliyev	0	0	1	0	0	0	0	0	0	0	1	0
97	(Kazakhstan)	MF	Daulet Zainetdinov	0	0	1	0	0	0	0	0	0	0	1	0
Players away on loan:
11	(Kazakhstan)	FW	Aleksey Shchotkin	4	1	0	0	0	0	0	0	0	0	4	1
21	(Kazakhstan)	DF	Berik Shaikhov	0	0	1	0	0	0	0	0	0	0	1	0
44	(Russia)	DF	Yevgeny Postnikov	4	0	0	0	0	0	0	0	0	0	4	0
Players who left Astana during the season:
20	(Nigeria)	MF	Lukman Haruna	2	0	0	0	0	0	0	0	0	0	2	0
			TOTALS	63	4	8	0	2	0	15	2	27	1	115	7
