= 2016 FC Irtysh Pavlodar season =

Irtysh
2016 season
- Chairman: Roman Skljar
- Manager: Dimitar Dimitrov
- Stadium: Central Stadium
- Kazakhstan Premier League: 3rd
- Kazakhstan Cup: Semifinal vs Astana
- Top goalscorer: League: Roman Murtazayev (18); All: Roman Murtazayev (19)
Home colours	Away colours

The 2016 FC Irtysh Pavlodar season is the 25th successive season that the club will play in the Kazakhstan Premier League, the highest tier of association football in Kazakhstan. Irtysh will also participate in the Kazakhstan Cup.

== Squad ==
As of 8 August 2016

Note: Flags indicate national team as defined under FIFA eligibility rules; some limited exceptions apply. Players may hold more than one non-FIFA nationality.

No.	Pos.	Nation	Player
1	GK	KAZ	David Loria
2	DF	KAZ	Yeldos Akhmetov
4	DF	LTU	Georgas Freidgeimas (loan from Žalgiris Vilnius)
8	DF	KAZ	Damir Dautov
9	FW	SEN	Baye Djiby Fall
10	FW	CHI	Ignacio Herrera
11	MF	GEO	Shota Grigalashvili
13	MF	KAZ	Alibek Ayaganov
15	DF	BIH	Semir Kerla
16	MF	CZE	Tomáš Jirsák
17	MF	KAZ	Vitali Li (loan from Kairat)

No.	Pos.	Nation	Player
19	DF	KAZ	Grigori Sartakov
20	GK	KAZ	Anton Tsirin
23	DF	KAZ	Piraliy Aliev
25	DF	KAZ	Ruslan Yesimov
33	MF	KAZ	Kazbek Geteriev
35	GK	KAZ	Serikbol Kapanov
40	MF	POR	Carlos Fonseca
45	FW	KAZ	Roman Murtazayev
57	MF	KAZ	Artem Popov
77	MF	KAZ	Vladimir Vomenko

=== Out on loan ===
Note: Flags indicate national team as defined under FIFA eligibility rules; some limited exceptions apply. Players may hold more than one non-FIFA nationality.

No.	Pos.	Nation	Player
22	FW	KAZ	Dmitri Rybalko (at Makhtaaral)
24	FW	KAZ	Kuanysh Begalin (at Akzhayik)
—	DF	KAZ	Igor Nazarov (at Kaisar)
—	DF	KAZ	Nursultan Alibayov (at Ekibastuz)

No.	Pos.	Nation	Player
—	DF	KAZ	Dauren Orymbay (at Ekibastuz)
—	MF	KAZ	Bagdat Urazaliev (at Ekibastuz)
—	MF	KAZ	Yuri Chifin (at Ekibastuz)
—	FW	KAZ	Muratkhan Zeynollin (at Shakhter Karagandy)

== Transfers ==
=== Winter ===
In: Note: Flags indicate national team as defined under FIFA eligibility rules; some limited exceptions apply. Players may hold more than one non-FIFA nationality.

No.	Pos.	Nation	Player
2	DF	KAZ	Yeldos Akhmetov (from (Kazakhstan) Astana)
4	DF	LTU	Georgas Freidgeimas (loan from (Lithuania) Žalgiris Vilnius)
6	DF	KAZ	Aleksandr Kirov (from (Kazakhstan) Shakhter Karagandy)
5	DF	BIH	Semir Kerla (from (Lithuania) Žalgiris Vilnius)
7	MF	GEO	Gogita Gogua (from (Georgia (country)) Dila Gori)
9	FW	SEN	Baye Djiby Fall (from (Turkey) Karşıyaka)
10	FW	CHI	Ignacio Herrera (from (Chile) Deportes Iquique)
27	DF	KAZ	Serhiy Malyi (from (Kazakhstan) Ordabasy)
40	MF	POR	Carlos Fonseca (from (Bulgaria) Slavia Sofia, previously on loan)
45	FW	KAZ	Roman Murtazayev (from (Kazakhstan) Shakhter Karagandy)
99	FW	GAM	Ousman Jallow (from (Finland) HJK)
—	FW	TTO	Lester Peltier (from (Slovakia) Slovan Bratislava)

Out: Note: Flags indicate national team as defined under FIFA eligibility rules; some limited exceptions apply. Players may hold more than one non-FIFA nationality.

No.	Pos.	Nation	Player
2	DF	KAZ	Vladimir Sedelnikov
3	DF	KAZ	Vladislav Chernyshov
8	MF	KAZ	Samat Smakov (to (Kazakhstan) Aktobe)
11	FW	KAZ	Yerkebulan Nurgaliyev
13	DF	KAZ	Berik Shaikhov (to (Kazakhstan) Astana)
14	MF	KAZ	Azat Ersalimov
17	MF	KAZ	Abylaykhan Totay (to (Kazakhstan) Aktobe)
21	GK	KAZ	Nikita Kalmykov
22	DF	KAZ	Dmitri Rybalko (loan to (Kazakhstan) Makhtaaral)
23	DF	KAZ	Zakhar Korobov (to (Kazakhstan) Akzhayik)
24	FW	KAZ	Kuanysh Begalin (loan to (Kazakhstan) Akzhayik)
30	FW	UKR	Kostyantyn Dudchenko (to (Kazakhstan) Tobol)
32	GK	KAZ	Denis Tolebayev
50	DF	CAF	Fernander Kassaï (loan return to (Bulgaria) Slavia Sofia)
60	FW	BRA	Evandro Roncatto (to (Brazil) Rio Branco)
80	MF	FRA	Alassane N'Diaye (to (Kazakhstan) Tobol)
90	DF	BRA	Antonio Ferreira (to (Brazil) Mirassol)
—	DF	KAZ	Igor Nazarov (loan to (Kazakhstan) Kaisar)
—	DF	KAZ	Nursultan Alibayov (loan to (Kazakhstan) Ekibastuz)
—	DF	KAZ	Dauren Orymbay (loan to (Kazakhstan) Ekibastuz)
—	MF	KAZ	Bagdat Urazaliev (loan to (Kazakhstan) Ekibastuz)
—	MF	KAZ	Yuri Chifin (loan to (Kazakhstan) Ekibastuz)
—	FW	KAZ	Muratkhan Zeynollin (loan to (Kazakhstan) Shakhter Karagandy)
—	FW	TTO	Lester Peltier

Trialists: Note: Flags indicate national team as defined under FIFA eligibility rules; some limited exceptions apply. Players may hold more than one non-FIFA nationality.

No.	Pos.	Nation	Player
—	DF	BRA	Junior Lopes
—	DF	CZE	Martin Klein
—	MF	BLR	Artsyom Rakhmanaw
—	MF	CMR	Njongo Priso
—	FW	BLR	Alyaksandr Makas
—	FW	CMR	Henri Belle
—	FW	CMR	Severin Bikoko
—	FW	CUW	Rihairo Meulens
—	FW	FRA	Joël Thomas

=== Summer ===
In: Note: Flags indicate national team as defined under FIFA eligibility rules; some limited exceptions apply. Players may hold more than one non-FIFA nationality.

No.	Pos.	Nation	Player
8	DF	KAZ	Damir Dautov (from (Kazakhstan) Kaisar)
11	MF	GEO	Shota Grigalashvili (from (Cyprus) Ethnikos Achna)
17	MF	KAZ	Vitali Li (loan from (Kazakhstan) Kairat)
—	FW	GHA	Kwame Karikari (loan from (Norway) Haugesund)

Out: Note: Flags indicate national team as defined under FIFA eligibility rules; some limited exceptions apply. Players may hold more than one non-FIFA nationality.

No.	Pos.	Nation	Player
5	DF	KAZ	Aleksandr Kislitsyn (to (Kazakhstan) Okzhetpes)
6	DF	KAZ	Aleksandr Kirov (to (Kazakhstan) Taraz)
7	MF	GEO	Gogita Gogua (to (Kazakhstan) Ordabasy)
27	DF	KAZ	Serhiy Malyi (to (Kazakhstan) Astana)
99	FW	GAM	Ousman Jallow (to (Finland) HJK)
—	FW	GHA	Kwame Karikari (loan return to (Norway) Haugesund)

== Friendlies ==
17 January 2016	Irtysh Pavlodar (Kazakhstan)	0 – 1	(Iran) Siahjamegan	Belek, Turkey
(UTC+6)		Summary

19 January 2016	Irtysh Pavlodar (Kazakhstan)	1 – 0	(Hungary) Szeged 2011	Belek, Turkey
(UTC+6)	A.Ayaganov 32'	Summary

3 February 2016	Irtysh Pavlodar (Kazakhstan)	3 – 2	(Georgia (country)) Dila Gori	Belek, Turkey
(UTC+6)	Meulens; Belle; Felipe Dos Santos	Summary

7 February 2016	Irtysh Pavlodar (Kazakhstan)	4 – 1	(Bulgaria) Slavia Sofia	Belek, Turkey
(UTC+6)	Murtazayev; Makas; Felipe Dos Santos	Summary	Goal

8 February 2016	Irtysh Pavlodar (Kazakhstan)	1 – 1	(Georgia (country)) Dinamo Batumi	Belek, Turkey
(UTC+6)	Makas	Summary	Goal

23 February 2016	Irtysh Pavlodar (Kazakhstan)	0 – 0	(Ukraine) Vorskla Poltava	Belek, Turkey
(UTC+6)		Summary

25 February 2016	Irtysh Pavlodar (Kazakhstan)	1 – 0	(Lithuania) Sūduva Marijampolė	Belek, Turkey
(UTC+6)	Slavickas (o.g.)	Summary

26 February 2016	Irtysh Pavlodar (Kazakhstan)	2 – 1	(Ukraine) Stal Dniprodzerzhynsk	Belek, Turkey
(UTC+6)	Gogua 34' (pen.); Fonseca 37'	Summary	Lazic 85'

28 February 2016	Irtysh Pavlodar	2 – 1	Kyzylzhar	Belek, Turkey
(UTC+6)	A.Ayaganov; Vomenko	Summary	Tleshev

1 March 2016	Irtysh Pavlodar (Kazakhstan)	2 – 0	(Denmark) AC Horsens	Belek, Turkey
(UTC+6)	Murtazayev; S.N'Ganbe	Summary

4 March 2016	Astana	5 – 1	Irtysh Pavlodar	Astana
15:00 (UTC+6)	Shchotkin; Maksimović; Twumasi; Despotović	Summary	Fonseca	Stadium: Astana Arena

== Competitions ==
=== Kazakhstan Premier League ===
==== Regular season ====
===== Results summary =====
Overall								Home						Away					
Pld	W	D	L	GF	GA	GD	Pts	W	D	L	GF	GA	GD	W	D	L	GF	GA	GD
22	12	5	5	37	18	+19	41	7	3	1	22	9	+13	5	2	4	15	9	+6

Last updated: 26 July 2016.
Source: See Results

===== Results by round =====
Round	1	2	3	4	5	6	7	8	9	10	11	12	13	14	15	16	17	18	19	20	21	22
Ground	H	A	H	A	H	A	H	A	H	H	A	H	A	H	A	H	A	H	A	A	H	A
Result	W	W	W	W	W	D	D	W	W	W	L	D	W	D	L	W	D	W	L	L	L	W
Position	4	1	1	1	1	2	2	2	2	2	2	2	2	2	2	2	2	2	2	3	3	3

Source: See results
A = Away; H = Home; W = Win; D = Draw; L = Loss

===== Results =====
13 March 2016 1	Irtysh Pavlodar	1 – 0	Okzhetpes	Pavlodar
15:00 (UTC+6)	Malyi 41'	Summary	Chertov (yellow card) 54'	Stadium: Central Stadium; Attendance: 5,500; Referee: Askhat Abdanbayev

19 March 2016 2	Akzhayik	0 – 3	Irtysh Pavlodar	Oral
16:00 (UTC+6)	M.Sapanov (yellow card) 58'; Sergienko (yellow card) 60'	Summary	Akhmetov 27'; Jallow 45+1'; Murtazayev 55' (yellow card) 70'; Fonseca (yellow card) 63'	Stadium: Petr Atoyan Stadium; Attendance: 2,000; Referee: Denis Izmailov

3 April 2016 3	Irtysh Pavlodar	3 – 0	Atyrau	Pavlodar
15:00 (UTC+6)	Loria (yellow card) 7'; R.Yesimov (yellow card) 30'; Murtazayev 50'; Malyi 59'; Gogua 82'	Summary	Trytko (yellow card) 7'; V.Kuzmin (yellow card) 29' (yellow-red card) 64'; Essame (yellow card) 64'; Muldarov (yellow card) 90'	Stadium: Central Stadium; Attendance: 5,000; Referee: Akmalkhan Kholmatov

9 April 2016 4	Shakhter Karagandy	0 – 2	Irtysh Pavlodar	Karaganda
15:00 (UTC+6)	Baizhanov (yellow card) 51'; Szöke (yellow card) 54'; Sadownichy (yellow card) 90+1'	Summary	Freidgeimas 26'; Kerla 58'; Fonseca (yellow card) 70'	Stadium: Shakhter Stadium; Attendance: 1,000; Referee: Igor Chesnokov

13 April 2016 5	Irtysh Pavlodar	2 – 0	Ordabasy	Pavlodar
18:00 (UTC+6)	Murtazayev 63'; Gogua 74' (pen.); Fonseca (yellow card) 78'; Herrera (yellow card) 87'	Summary	Abdulin (yellow card) 28'; B.Kozhabayev (yellow card) 74'; E.Tungyshbaev (yellow card) 80'	Stadium: Central Stadium; Attendance: 6,500; Referee: Ruslan Duzmambetov

17 April 2016 6	Aktobe	1 – 1	Irtysh Pavlodar	Aktobe
17:00 (UTC+6)	Kouadja (yellow card) 21'; Tleshev (yellow card) 69'; Smakov 87' (pen.); Zhangylyshbay (yellow card) 89'	Summary	Gogua 22' (pen.) (yellow card) 37'; Aliev (yellow card) 65'	Stadium: Central Stadium; Attendance: 9,000; Referee: Marat Iskakov

23 April 2016 7	Irtysh Pavlodar	2 – 2	Astana	Pavlodar
18:00 (UTC+6)	Akhmetov 2'; Fonseca 60'; Freidgeimas (yellow card) 81'; Kerla (yellow card) 87'; Gogua (yellow card) 90+2'	Summary	Despotović 7'; Muzhikov 31'; Cañas (yellow card) 44'; Beisebekov (yellow card) 46'	Stadium: Central Stadium; Attendance: 9,200; Referee: Anatolyi Vishnichenko

1 May 2016 8	Zhetysu	0 – 3	Irtysh Pavlodar	Taldykorgan
17:00 (UTC+6)		Summary	Murtazayev 39', 41'; Fonseca (yellow card) 69'; Gogua (yellow card) 80'; Herrera 90+3'	Stadium: Zhetysu Stadium; Attendance: 2,500; Referee: Bolat Karlibayev

5 May 2016 9	Irtysh Pavlodar	3 – 1	Tobol	Pavlodar
18:00 (UTC+6)	Fall 25'; Malyi (yellow card) 44'; Jirsák (yellow card) 58'; Murtazayev 74'; Gogua 76' (pen.)	Summary	Šimkovič (yellow card) 29'; Zhumaskaliyev 44'	Stadium: Central Stadium; Attendance: 7,500; Referee: Askhat Abdanbayev

9 May 2016 10	Irtysh Pavlodar	2 – 1	Taraz	Pavlodar
18:00 (UTC+6)	Murtazayev 16'; Malyi (yellow card) 20'; Akhmetov (yellow card) 52'; Fall 56'	Summary	Vorotnikov (yellow card) 29'; K.Karaman (yellow card) 31'; Mané 34'	Stadium: Central Stadium; Attendance: 6,500; Referee: Timur Kumashev

15 May 2016 11	Kairat	1 – 0	Irtysh Pavlodar	Almaty
18:00 (UTC+6)	Isael 22'; Tymoshchuk (yellow card) 27'; V.Plotnikov (yellow card) 90+3'	Summary	Fonseca (yellow card) 25'; Malyi (yellow card) 45' (yellow-red card) 85'; Akhmetov (yellow card) 55'; Aliev (yellow card) 77'	Stadium: Central Stadium; Attendance: 12,500; Referee: Aryom Kuchin

21 May 2016 12	Irtysh Pavlodar	0 – 0	Akzhayik	Pavlodar
18:00 (UTC+6)	Fall (yellow card) 70'; Akhmetov (red card) 78'	Summary	A.Shurygin (yellow card) 12'; Govedarica (yellow card) 44' (yellow-red card) 73'; R.Bagautdinov (yellow card) 87'	Stadium: Central Stadium; Attendance: 5,000; Referee: Daniyar Sakhi

29 May 2016 13	Atyrau	0 – 1	Irtysh Pavlodar	Atyrau
19:00 (UTC+6)	Korobkin (yellow card) 15'	Summary	Fonseca (yellow card) 40'; Murtazayev (yellow card) 44' (goal) 50'; Aliev (yellow card) 45'; Fall (yellow card) 71'; Loria (yellow card) 90+1'	Stadium: Munaishy Stadium; Attendance: 3,000; Referee: Igor Chesnokov

2 June 2016 14	Irtysh Pavlodar	0 – 0	Shakhter Karagandy	Pavlodar
19:30 (UTC+6)	Freidgeimas (yellow card) 23'; R.Yesimov (yellow card) 57'; Geteriev (yellow card) 69'	Summary	Y.Tarasov (yellow card) 21'; Y.Baginskiy (yellow card) 90'	Stadium: Central Stadium; Attendance: 4,800; Referee: Askhat Abdanbayev

11 June 2016 15	Ordabasy	2 – 0	Irtysh Pavlodar	Shymkent
18:00 (UTC+6)	Abdulin (yellow card) 19'; Nurgaliev 27', 59' (pen.); Gogua (yellow card) 48'; Trajković (yellow card) 51'; E.Tungyshbaev (yellow card) 85'; Boychenko (yellow card) 90+2'	Summary	Fonseca (yellow card) 41'; Jirsák (yellow card) 50'	Stadium: Kazhymukan Munaitpasov Stadium; Attendance: 5,000; Referee: Marat Iskakov

15 June 2016 16	Irtysh Pavlodar	4 – 1	Aktobe	Pavlodar
19:00 (UTC+6)	Herrera 2'; Murtazayev 35' (pen.); Akhmetov 48'; Aliev (yellow card) 50'; Jallow 82'	Summary	Azovskiy (yellow card) 35'; D.Zhalmukan 55'; V.Kryukov (yellow card) 65'; Sitdikov (yellow card) 67'	Stadium: Central Stadium; Attendance: 4,500; Referee: Denis Tevyashov

19 June 2016 17	Astana	1 – 1	Irtysh Pavlodar	Astana
17:00 (UTC+6)	Twumasi (yellow card) 37'; Nusserbayev (yellow card) 50' (goal) 51'	Summary	Jallow (yellow card) 36'; Kerla (yellow card) 59' (goal) 69'; Murtazayev (yellow card) 86'; Loria (yellow card) 90'	Stadium: Astana Arena; Attendance: 7,500; Referee: Sergey Gorokhovodatskiy

25 June 2016 18	Irtysh Pavlodar	3 – 1	Zhetysu	Pavlodar
19:00 (UTC+6)	Jallow 33'; Ignacio Herrera\Herrera 81'; Freidgeimas (yellow card) 85'; Murtazayev 87'; Fonseca (yellow card) 90+1'	Summary	V.Borovskiy 12' (yellow card) 23' (yellow-red card) 53'; Savić (yellow card) 82'	Stadium: Central Stadium; Attendance: 4,000; Referee: Bolat Karlibayev

3 July 2016 19	Tobol	3 – 2	Irtysh Pavlodar	Kostanay
19:00 (UTC+6)	Žulpa 18'; Šimkovič 23' (pen.) (yellow card) 40'; Asildarov 63' (pen.); Khizhnichenko (yellow card) 85'	Summary	Kerla (yellow card) 23'; Jirsák 54' (yellow card) 63'; Loria (yellow card) 57'; Jallow (yellow card) 65'; Grigalashvili 68'	Stadium: Central Stadium; Attendance: 4,000; Referee: Marat Iskakov

9 July 2016 20	Taraz	1 – 0	Irtysh Pavlodar	Taraz
19:00 (UTC+6)	Mera 40'; Grigoryev (yellow card) 51'; A.Taubay (yellow card) 60'; Kirov (yellow card) 76'; Ergashev (yellow card) 90+2'	Summary	Freidgeimas (yellow card) 7'; Aliev (yellow card) 21'; Jirsák (yellow card) 23'; R.Yesimov (yellow card) 27'; D.Dautov (yellow card) 90'	Stadium: Central Stadium; Attendance: 4,000; Referee: Denis Tevyashov

17 July 2016 21	Irtysh Pavlodar	2 – 3	Kairat	Pavlodar
19:00 (UTC+6)	Kerla 5'; Murtazayev 45+1'; R.Yesimov (yellow card) 51'; Aliev (yellow card) 75'	Summary	Kuat (yellow card) 6'; Islamkhan 16' (pen.); Tawamba 22', 39'; Pokatilov (yellow card) 45+1'	Stadium: Central Stadium; Attendance: 8,700; Referee: Artyom Kuchin

24 July 2016 22	Okzhetpes	0 – 2	Irtysh Pavlodar	Kokshetau
19:00 (UTC+6)	Buleshev (yellow card) 37' (yellow-red card) 89'; D.Babakhanov (yellow card) 73'; Z.Moldakaraev (yellow card) 79'; Chichulin (yellow card) 86'	Summary	Murtazayev 27'; Grigalashvili (yellow card) 36'; Geteriev (yellow card) 61' (goal) 67'	Stadium: Okzhetpes Stadium; Attendance: 3,500; Referee: Aydin Rakhimbayev

===== League table =====
Pos	Team	Pld	W	D	L	GF	GA	GD	Pts	Qualification
1	Astana	22	17	2	3	34	14	+20	53	Qualification for the championship round
2	Kairat	22	14	4	4	50	22	+28	46	Qualification for the championship round
3	Irtysh Pavlodar	22	12	5	5	37	18	+19	41	Qualification for the championship round
4	Okzhetpes	22	11	4	7	33	23	+10	37	Qualification for the championship round
5	Ordabasy	22	9	6	7	26	27	−1	33	Qualification for the championship round

Source: UEFA.com, Soccerway
Rules for classification: 1) Points; 2) Head-to-head points; 3) Head-to-head matches won; 4) Head-to-head goal difference; 5) Head-to-head goals scored; 6) Head-to-head away goals scored; 7) Goal difference; 8) Matches won; 9) Goals scored; 10) Away goals scored; 11) Draw.

==== Championship round ====
===== Results summary =====
Overall								Home						Away					
Pld	W	D	L	GF	GA	GD	Pts	W	D	L	GF	GA	GD	W	D	L	GF	GA	GD
10	2	2	6	15	18	−3	8	1	1	3	7	8	−1	1	1	3	8	10	−2

Last updated: 31 October 2016.
Source: See Results

===== Results by round =====
Round	1	2	3	4	5	6	7	8	9	10
Ground	A	H	A	H	A	A	H	A	H	H
Result	L	L	L	L	L	W	W	D	L	D
Position	3	3	3	3	4	3	3	3	3	3

Source: See results
A = Away; H = Home; W = Win; D = Draw; L = Loss

===== Results =====
12 August 2016 1	Astana	3 – 0	Irtysh Pavlodar	Astana
16:00 (UTC+6)	Logvinenko 11' (yellow card) 90+4'; Kabananga 32'; Despotović 90'	Summary	Kerla (yellow card) 36'; Fonseca (yellow card) 90+4'	Stadium: Astana Arena; Attendance: 2,000; Referee: Denis Izmailov

20 August 2016 2	Irtysh Pavlodar	0 – 2	Okzhetpes	Pavlodar
17:00 (UTC+6)		Summary	I.Mangutkin (yellow card) 11'; Canales 21'; Khairullin 88'	Stadium: Central Stadium; Attendance: 3,500; Referee: Askhat Abdanbayev

26 August 2016 3	Aktobe	1 – 0	Irtysh Pavlodar	Aktobe
20:00 (UTC+6)	Kouadja (yellow card) 56'; Bocharov 62'; B.Davlatov (yellow card) 65'	Summary		Stadium: Central Stadium; Attendance: 4,000; Referee: Furkat Atajanow

11 September 2016 4	Irtysh Pavlodar	1 – 2	Ordabasy	Pavlodar
19:00 (UTC+6)	Aliev (yellow card) 16'; V.Li (yellow card) 29'; A.Ayaganov (yellow card) 62'; Murtazayev 70'; R.Yesimov (yellow card) 85'; Fonseca (yellow card) 85'	Summary	Gogua (yellow card) 30'; Geynrikh 41' (pen.), 45+3'; Kasalica (yellow card) 88'; M.Tolebek (yellow card) 90'	Stadium: Central Stadium; Attendance: 4,500; Referee: Sergey Gorokhovodatskiy

17 September 2016 5	Kairat	2 – 1	Irtysh Pavlodar	Almaty
18:00 (UTC+6)	Gohou 23'; Islamkhan 81'	Summary	Fonseca (yellow card) 30'; Grigalashvili 78' (yellow card) 90'	Stadium: Central Stadium; Attendance: 8,800; Referee: Askhat Abdanbayev

25 September 2016 6	Okzhetpes	1 – 4	Irtysh Pavlodar	Kokshetau
16:00 (UTC+6)	Khairullin 37' (pen.) (red card) 59'	Summary	Fonseca 17'; Murtazayev 52', 55'; Geteriev 76'	Stadium: Okzhetpes Stadium; Attendance: 1,500; Referee: Aleksandr Aliyev

1 October 2016 7	Irtysh Pavlodar	5 – 1	Aktobe	Pavlodar
17:00 (UTC+6)	Grigalashvili 16'; Sartakov (yellow card) 29'; Fonseca 36', 41'; Murtazayev 44', 90+2'	Summary	B.Kairov (yellow card) 3'; Bocharov 76'	Stadium: Central Stadium; Attendance: 3,500; Referee: Aleksandr Gauzer

16 October 2016 8	Ordabasy	3 – 3	Irtysh Pavlodar	Shymkent
15:30 (UTC+6)	Trajković (yellow card) 4'; Gogua (yellow card) 18' Geynrikh 45+1' (pen.), 88' (pen.); Diakate 45+2'; Abdulin (yellow card) 57'; B.Kozhabayev (yellow card) 72'; Smakov (yellow card) 90+6'	Summary	Murtazayev 22' (pen.); Aliev (yellow card) 24'; Fonseca 27'; Kerla (yellow card) 45+1' (yellow-red card) 90+6'; Akhmetov 58' (yellow card) 68'	Stadium: Kazhymukan Munaitpasov Stadium; Attendance: 4,000; Referee: Artyom Kuchin

23 October 2016 9	Irtysh Pavlodar	1 – 3	Kairat	Pavlodar
15:00 (UTC+6)	Fonseca 85'	Summary	Islamkhan (yellow card) 24' (goal) 67'; Gohou 54', 90+3' (yellow card) 76'; Arshavin (yellow card) 62'	Stadium: Central Stadium; Attendance: 4,000; Referee: Bagdat Abdullaev

29 October 2016 10	Irtysh Pavlodar	0 – 0	Astana	Pavlodar
17:00 (UTC+6)	Kerla (yellow card) 45'; A.Ayaganov (yellow card) 51'	Summary	Malyi (yellow card) 28'; A.Zhunussov (yellow card) 38' (yellow-red card) 85'; Nusserbayev (yellow card) 70'	Stadium: Central Stadium; Attendance: 3,500; Referee: Denis Tevyashov

===== League table =====
Pos	Team	Pld	W	D	L	GF	GA	GD	Pts	Qualification
1	Astana (C)	32	23	4	5	47	21	+26	73	Qualification for the Champions League second qualifying round (Note: Astana qualified for the Europa League first qualifying round by winning the 2016 Kazakhstan Cup. However, since they already qualified for European competition based on their league position, the spot awarded to the cup winners was passed down the league.)
2	Kairat	32	22	5	5	75	30	+45	71	Qualification for the Europa League first qualifying round
3	Irtysh Pavlodar	32	14	7	11	52	36	+16	49	Qualification for the Europa League first qualifying round
4	Ordabasy	32	13	9	10	41	44	−3	48	Qualification for the Europa League first qualifying round
5	Okzhetpes	32	13	6	13	42	44	−2	45	
6	Aktobe	32	9	9	14	37	52	−15	36	

Source: Soccerway
Rules for classification: 1) Points; 2) Play-off (only if deciding champion when two teams are tied); 3) Head-to-head points; 4) Head-to-head matches won; 5) Head-to-head goal difference; 6) Head-to-head goals scored; 7) Head-to-head away goals scored; 8) Goal difference; 9) Matches won; 10) Goals scored; 11) Away goals scored; 12) Draw.
(C) Champions

=== Kazakhstan Cup ===
27 April 2016 Last 16	Akzhayik	0 – 1	Irtysh Pavlodar	Oral
18:00 (UTC+6)		Summary	Herrera 8'; Murtazayev (yellow card) 13'; A.Ayaganov (yellow card) 52'; Kerla (yellow card) 65'	Stadium: Petr Atoyan Stadium; Attendance: 1,500; Referee: Bagdat Abdullaev

25 May 2016 Quarterfinal	Okzhetpes	1 – 2	Irtysh Pavlodar	Astana
19:00 (UTC+6)	Ristović (yellow card) 27'; S.Zhumahanov (yellow card) 45'; Chertov 49' (yellow card) 86'	Summary	Fonseca 41' (yellow card) 90+3'; Akhmetov (yellow card) 69'; Fall 73' (yellow card) 86'; Tsirin (yellow card) 90'	Stadium: Astana Arena; Attendance: 1,000; Referee: Sergey Gorokhovodatskiy

21 September 2016 Semifinal 1st leg	Irtysh Pavlodar	1 – 2	Astana	Pavlodar
19:00 (UTC+6)	Murtazayev 33'	Summary	A.Tagybergen 23'; Nusserbayev 37' (yellow card) 71'; Nurgaliev (yellow card) 89'; D.Zainetdinov (yellow card) 90+3'	Stadium: Central Stadium; Attendance: 5,500; Referee: Igor Chesnokov

6 November 2016 Semifinal 2nd leg	Astana	5 – 3 (7 – 4 agg.)	Irtysh Pavlodar	Astana
15:00 (UTC+6)	Despotović 19'; A.Aliyev (yellow card) 27'; Kabananga 35', 62'; B.Kulbekov (yellow card) 70'; Malyi 84'; Cañas 90+2'	Summary	A.Smailov 37', 48'; Fonseca 45'; R.Bogdanov (yellow card) 57'; M.Ramazanov (yellow card) 83'	Stadium: Astana Arena; Attendance: 2,200; Referee: Denis Izmailov

== Squad statistics ==
As of Match played 6 November 2016

=== Appearances and goals ===
No.	Pos	Nat	Player	Total		Premier League		Kazakhstan Cup	
No.	Pos	Nat	Player	Apps	Goals	Apps	Goals	Apps	Goals
1	GK	(Kazakhstan) KAZ	David Loria	24	0	24	0	0	0
2	DF	(Kazakhstan) KAZ	Yeldos Akhmetov	25	4	23	4	2	0
4	DF	(Lithuania) LTU	Georgas Freidgeimas	31	1	28	1	1+2	0
8	DF	(Kazakhstan) KAZ	Damir Dautov	9	0	8	0	1	0
9	FW	(Senegal) SEN	Baye Djiby Fall	27	3	11+13	2	1+2	1
10	FW	(Chile) CHI	Ignacio Herrera	30	4	12+15	3	3	1
11	MF	(Georgia (country)) GEO	Shota Grigalashvili	13	3	8+4	3	0+1	0
13	MF	(Kazakhstan) KAZ	Alibek Ayaganov	13	0	3+7	0	3	0
14	DF	(Kazakhstan) KAZ	Igor Nazarov	1	0	0	0	0+1	0
15	DF	(Bosnia and Herzegovina) BIH	Semir Kerla	27	3	23+1	3	3	0
16	MF	(Czech Republic) CZE	Tomáš Jirsák	29	1	27	1	2	0
17	MF	(Kazakhstan) KAZ	Vitali Li	11	0	3+7	0	1	0
18	DF	(Kazakhstan) KAZ	Valeriy Lenkov	1	0	0	0	1	0
19	DF	(Kazakhstan) KAZ	Grigori Sartakov	17	0	10+4	0	2+1	0
20	GK	(Kazakhstan) KAZ	Anton Tsirin	10	0	7	0	3	0
23	DF	(Kazakhstan) KAZ	Piraliy Aliev	21	0	9+10	0	2	0
25	DF	(Kazakhstan) KAZ	Ruslan Yesimov	21	0	18+1	0	2	0
33	MF	(Kazakhstan) KAZ	Kazbek Geteriev	27	2	22+4	2	1	0
35	GK	(Kazakhstan) KAZ	Serikbol Kapanov	1	0	0	0	1	0
40	MF	(Portugal) POR	Carlos Fonseca	30	7	27	5	3	2
45	FW	(Kazakhstan) KAZ	Roman Murtazayev	34	19	29+2	18	3	1
57	MF	(Kazakhstan) KAZ	Artem Popov	7	0	1+4	0	0+2	0
67	FW	(Kazakhstan) KAZ	Batyr Kudayberdinov	1	0	0	0	1	0
77	MF	(Kazakhstan) KAZ	Vladimir Vomenko	5	0	0+4	0	1	0
78	MF	(Kazakhstan) KAZ	Magyar Ramazanov	1	0	0	0	1	0
88	MF	(Kazakhstan) KAZ	Yuriy Golofast	1	0	0	0	1	0
95	DF	(Kazakhstan) KAZ	Roman Bogdanov	1	0	0	0	1	0
97	FW	(Kazakhstan) KAZ	Arman Smailov	1	2	0	0	1	2
Players away from Irtysh Pavlodar on loan:
Players who appeared for Irtysh Pavlodar that left during the season:
5	DF	(Kazakhstan) KAZ	Aleksandr Kislitsyn	3	0	2+1	0	0	0
7	MF	(Georgia (country)) GEO	Gogita Gogua	12	4	11+1	4	0	0
27	DF	(Kazakhstan) KAZ	Serhiy Malyi	16	2	14	2	2	0
99	FW	(The Gambia) GAM	Ousman Jallow	22	3	21	3	1	0

=== Goal scorers ===
Place	Position	Nation	Number	Name	Premier League	Kazakhstan Cup	Total
1	FW	(Kazakhstan)	45	Roman Murtazayev	18	1	19
2	MF	(Portugal)	40	Carlos Fonseca	5	1	6
3	MF	(Georgia (country))	7	Gogita Gogua	4	0	4
3	DF	(Kazakhstan)	2	Yeldos Akhmetov	4	0	4
3	FW	(Chile)	10	Ignacio Herrera	3	1	4
6	FW	(The Gambia)	99	Ousman Jallow	3	0	3
6	DF	(Bosnia and Herzegovina)	15	Semir Kerla	3	0	3
6	FW	(Georgia (country))	11	Shota Grigalashvili	3	0	3
6	FW	(Senegal)	9	Baye Djiby Fall	2	1	3
10	DF	(Kazakhstan)	6	Serhiy Malyi	2	0	2
10	MF	(Kazakhstan)	35	Kazbek Geteriev	2	0	2
12	DF	(Lithuania)	4	Georgas Freidgeimas	1	0	1
12	MF	(Czech Republic)	16	Tomáš Jirsák	1	0	1
				TOTALS	51	4	55

=== Disciplinary record ===
Number	Nation	Position	Name	Premier League		Kazakhstan Cup		Total	
Number	Nation	Position	Name	Yellow card	Red card	Yellow card	Red card	Yellow card	Red card
1	(Kazakhstan)	GK	David Loria	4	0	0	0	4	0
2	(Kazakhstan)	DF	Yeldos Akhmetov	3	1	1	0	4	1
4	(Lithuania)	DF	Georgas Freidgeimas	4	0	0	0	4	0
7	(Georgia (country))	MF	Gogita Gogua	3	0	0	0	3	0
8	(Kazakhstan)	DF	Damir Dautov	2	0	1	0	3	0
9	(Senegal)	FW	Baye Djiby Fall	2	0	1	0	3	0
10	(Chile)	FW	Ignacio Herrera	1	0	0	0	1	0
11	(Georgia (country))	MF	Shota Grigalashvili	2	0	0	0	2	0
13	(Kazakhstan)	MF	Alibek Ayaganov	2	0	1	0	3	0
15	(Bosnia and Herzegovina)	DF	Semir Kerla	7	1	1	0	8	1
16	(Czech Republic)	MF	Tomáš Jirsák	4	0	0	0	4	0
17	(Kazakhstan)	MF	Vitali Li	1	0	0	0	1	0
19	(Kazakhstan)	DF	Grigori Sartakov	1	0	0	0	1	0
20	(Kazakhstan)	GK	Anton Tsirin	0	0	1	0	1	0
23	(Kazakhstan)	DF	Piraliy Aliev	8	0	0	0	8	0
25	(Kazakhstan)	DF	Ruslan Yesimov	5	0	0	0	5	0
27	(Kazakhstan)	DF	Serhiy Malyi	4	1	0	0	4	1
33	(Kazakhstan)	MF	Kazbek Geteriev	2	0	0	0	2	0
40	(Portugal)	MF	Carlos Fonseca	11	0	1	0	12	0
45	(Kazakhstan)	FW	Roman Murtazayev	3	0	1	0	4	0
78	(Kazakhstan)	MF	Magyar Ramazanov	0	0	1	0	1	0
95	(Kazakhstan)	DF	Roman Bogdanov	0	0	1	0	1	0
99	(The Gambia)	FW	Ousman Jallow	2	0	0	0	2	0
			TOTALS	70	3	9	0	79	3
