= Baye Djiby Fall =

Senegalese footballer

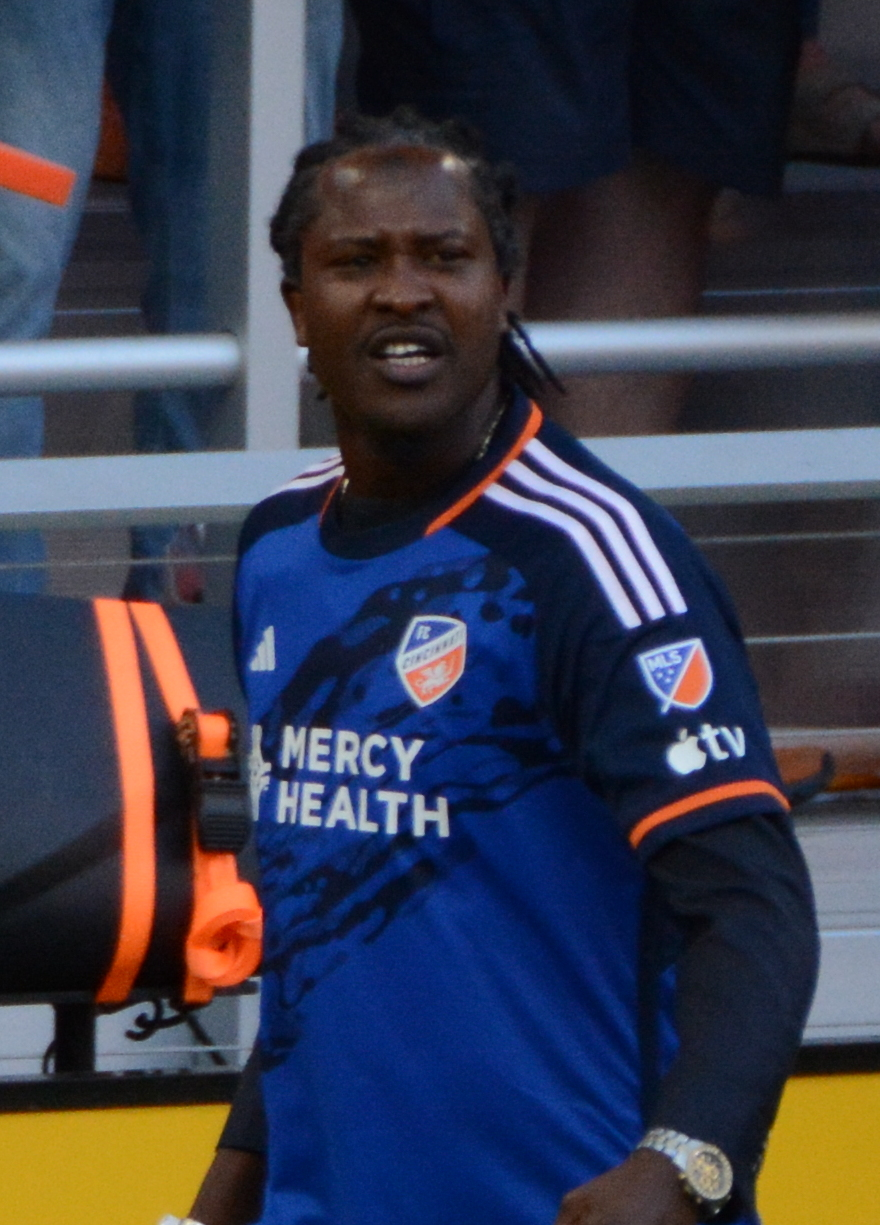
- Fall at a FC Cincinnati match in 2023

Personal information
- Date of birth: 20 April 1985 (age 41)
- Place of birth: Thiès, Senegal
- Height: 1.86 m (6 ft 1 in)
- Position: Forward

Team information
- Current team: Génération Foot (manager)

Youth career
- Saint-Louis Center
- Auxerre

Senior career*
Years	Team	Apps	(Gls)
–2006	Vitré	16	(8)
2006–2007	Randers	30	(14)
2007–2008	Al-Ain	3	(1)
2008–2009	OB	31	(18)
2009–2012	Lokomotiv Moscow	15	(0)
2010	→ Molde (loan)	28	(16)
2011–2012	→ OB (loan)	10	(2)
2012	Lokeren	7	(5)
2012–2013	Greuther Fürth	2	(0)
2013–2015	Randers	37	(10)
2015–2016	Karşıyaka	15	(1)
2016–2017	Irtysh Pavlodar	25	(2)
2017	FC Cincinnati	24	(12)
2018	Hobro	6	(0)
Total		249	(89)

International career
2009	Senegal	2	(0)

Managerial career
- 2019–: Génération Foot
- * Club domestic league appearances and goals

Baye Djiby Fall (born 20 April 1985), often referred to simply as Djiby, is a Senegalese professional football coach and a former forward. He is the manager of Génération Foot. Fall last played for Hobro IK in the 2018–19 Danish Superliga. Fall has previously played professionally for top-flight clubs in Denmark, the United Arab Emirates, Russia, Norway and Belgium. In Norway, he was the top goalscorer in Tippeligaen with his 16 goals for Molde FK.

== Career ==
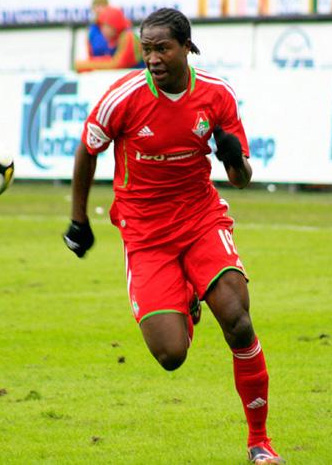
Fall playing for Lokomotiv Moscow in 2009

Born in Thiès, Senegal, Fall moved to France at the age of 18, where he joined Auxerre's academy. After spells at the French club AS Vitré, Danish club Randers and Emirati club Al Ain he joined Odense Boldklub in January 2008 where he was named the best player in the Danish Superliga. After 18 goals in 33 matches for OB the Senegalese top striker moved to Russian club Lokomotiv Moscow.

After playing 11 matches for Lokomotiv Moscow without scoring any goals, he was loaned out to Norwegian club Molde on 25 January 2010. Molde's head coach Kjell Jonevret said that even though Fall was bigger and stronger, and a different kind of player than Mame Biram Diouf, he was considered a replacement for the player who was transferred to Manchester United. Fall's loan deal lasted until 30 August 2010, with an option to buy. In July 2010, Molde extended the loan-deal to the end of the 2010-season and Fall went on to become top scorer of Tippeligaen (the Norwegian top division) for the 2010 season, despite a lower half finish for Molde. Fall became the first Molde player since Jan Fuglset in 1976 with this achievement. Fall was later loaned out to his old club OB, and in the 2011–12 UEFA Europa League, he scored with his final move in the 93rd minute to dump Fulham out of the competition following a 2–2 draw.

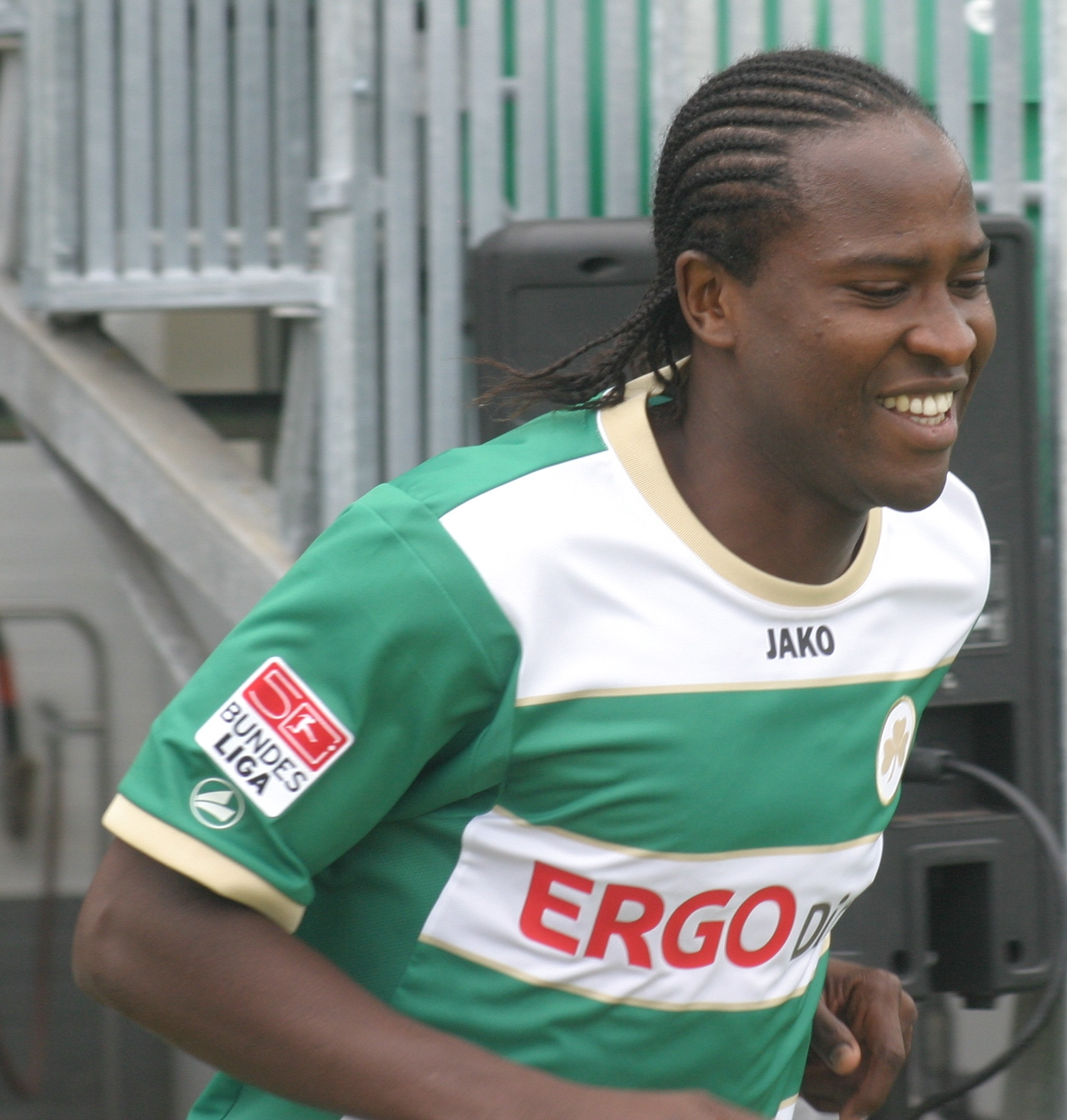
Fall with Greuther Fürth in 2012

In January 2012, Fall joined the Belgium club Lokeren. In August 2012, he was signed as a replacement for Olivier Occéan in the German club Greuther Fürth, who had been promoted to the Bundesliga for the first time. Germany became the eighth country Fall had been playing football in the last eight years. Fall played two matches without scoring a goal during his first season in Germany, and after the season Greuther Fürth was trying to sell Fall to another club. He returned to his old club Randers on the last day of the transfer window.

=== Irtysh Pavlodar ===
In February 2016, Fall went on trial with Kazakhstan Premier League side FC Irtysh Pavlodar, signing for them on 3 March 2016.

After initially announcing the release of Fall on 1 July 2016, FC Irtysh Pavlodar announced on 6 July 2016 that due to a ban imposed on them registering new players Fall would continue playing for the club.

Fall signed for Hobro IK in Denmark in the summer of 2018. He left the club again at the end of his contract, which was on 1 January 2019, after playing 6 games for the club.

=== FC Cincinnati ===
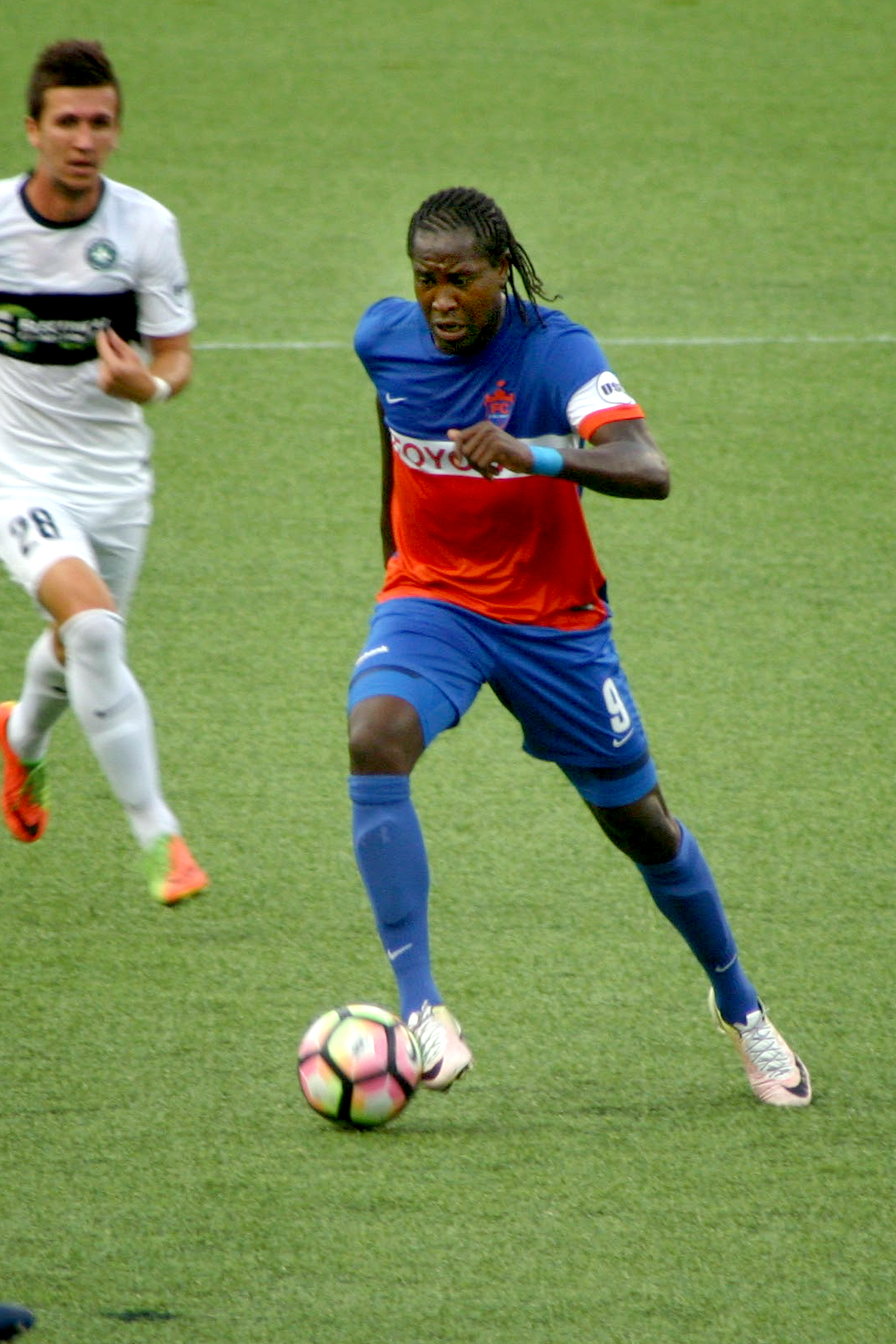
Fall competing for FC Cincinnati of the United Soccer League in a game against St. Louis FC in Cincinnati on 24 June 2017

On 13 February 2017, Fall signed for United Soccer League side FC Cincinnati. He scored four goals in FC Cincinnati's home opener on 15 April 2017. On 22 April 2017, Fall was shown a red card towards the end of a match against Louisville City FC at Nippert Stadium in Cincinnati. In an exchange that took place as he was exiting the pitch, Fall allegedly bit Louisville midfielder Niall McCabe on the cheek. This resulted in a six-game ban and an undisclosed fine handed down by the USL. Fall was released by Cincinnati at the end of their 2017 season.

== Career statistics ==
=== Club ===
As of match played 22 October 2017

Appearances and goals by club, season and competition
Club	Season	League			National Cup		Continental		Other		Total	
Club	Season	Division	Apps	Goals	Apps	Goals	Apps	Goals	Apps	Goals	Apps	Goals
Lokomotiv Moscow	2009	Russian Premier League	11	0	1	0	–		–		12	0
Lokomotiv Moscow	2010	Russian Premier League	0	0	0	0	0	0	–		0	0
Lokomotiv Moscow	2011–12	Russian Premier League	4	0	0	0	0	0	–		4	0
Lokomotiv Moscow	Total		15	0	1	0	0	0	0	0	16	0
Molde (loan)	2010	Tippeligaen	28	16	2	1	4	2	–		34	19
OB (loan)	2011–12	Danish Superliga	10	2	0	0	6	4	–		16	6
Lokeren	2011–12	Belgian Pro League	6	5	2	0	–		–		8	5
Lokeren	2012–13	Belgian Pro League	2	0	0	0	–		1	0	3	0
Lokeren	Total		8	5	2	0	0	0	1	0	11	5
Greuther Fürth	2012–13	Bundesliga	2	0	0	0	–		–		2	0
Greuther Fürth	2013–14	2. Bundesliga	0	0	0	0	–		–		0	0
Greuther Fürth	Total		2	0	0	0	0	0	0	0	2	0
Randers	2013–14	Danish Superliga	12	1	0	0	–		–		12	1
Randers	2014–15	Danish Superliga	25	9	2	0	–		–		27	9
Randers	Total		37	10	2	0	0	0	0	0	39	10
Karşıyaka	2015–16	TFF First League	14	1	2	1	–		–		16	2
Irtysh Pavlodar	2016	Kazakhstan Premier League	25	2	3	1	–		–		28	3
FC Cincinnati	2017	United Soccer League	25	12	4	4	–		–		29	16
Hobro	2018–19	Danish Superliga	0	0	0	0	–		–		0	0
Career total			160	48	16	7	10	6	1	0	187	61

=== International ===
Appearances and goals by national team and year
National team	Year	Apps	Goals
Senegal	2009	2	0
Total		2	0

== Honours ==
Lokeren

- Belgian Cup: 2011–12

Individual

- Danish Superliga Player of the Year: 2007–08
- Tippeligaen top scorer: 2010
- Molde top scorer: 19 goals in 2010
