= Konstantin Engel =

Kazakh footballer

Personal information
- Full name: Konstantin Engel
- Date of birth: 27 July 1988 (age 38)
- Place of birth: Karaganda, Kazakh SSR
- Height: 1.80 m (5 ft 11 in)
- Position: Right back

Team information
- Current team: SSV Jeddeloh
- Number: 5

Youth career
- 2002–2004: Viktoria Georgsmarienhütte
- 2004–2006: VfL Osnabrück

Senior career*
Years	Team	Apps	(Gls)
2006–2008	VfL Osnabrück II	58	(1)
2006–2011	VfL Osnabrück	67	(2)
2011–2013	Energie Cottbus	34	(0)
2011–2013	Energie Cottbus II	3	(0)
2013–2016	FC Ingolstadt	33	(0)
2013–2016	FC Ingolstadt II	3	(0)
2016	Astana	0	(0)
2017–2021	VfL Osnabrück	75	(5)
2021–	SSV Jeddeloh	70	(1)

International career^{‡}
2012–2015	Kazakhstan	11	(0)
- * Club domestic league appearances and goals as of 23 April 2024 ‡ National team caps and goals as of 12 August 2021

Konstantin Engel (Russian: Константин Энгель; born 27 July 1988) is a Kazakh professional footballer who plays as a defender for SSV Jeddeloh.

== Career ==
Engel was born in Karaganda, Kazakh SSR. He made his professional debut in the 2. Bundesliga for VfL Osnabrück on 15 August 2008 when he started a game against FC St. Pauli. He eventually became a constant member of the startup line and scored his first goal on 1 May 2009 with a winner against Wehen Wiesbaden.

On 5 August 2016, Engel signed for FC Astana in the Kazakhstan Premier League.

Engel returned to VfL Osnabrück on 27 January 2017, after six months with Astana, where he was unable to make an appearance.

== Career statistics ==
=== Club ===
As of match played 1 August 2020

Appearances and goals by club, season and competition
Club	Season	League			National Cup		Continental		Other		Total	
Club	Season	Division	Apps	Goals	Apps	Goals	Apps	Goals	Apps	Goals	Apps	Goals
VfL Osnabrück	2006–07	Regionalliga Nord	1	0			–		–		1	0
VfL Osnabrück	2008–09	2. Bundesliga	20	1			–		1	0	21	0
VfL Osnabrück	2009–10	3. Liga	23	1	3	0	–		–		26	1
VfL Osnabrück	2010–11	2. Bundesliga	23	0	0	0	–		2	0	25	0
VfL Osnabrück	Total		67	2	3	0	0	0	3	0	73	2
Energie Cottbus	2011–12	2. Bundesliga	14	0	0	0	–		–		14	0
Energie Cottbus	2012–13	2. Bundesliga	20	0	1	0	–		–		21	0
Energie Cottbus	Total		34	0	1	0	0	0	0	0	35	0
Ingolstadt 04	2013–14	2. Bundesliga	15	0	0	0	–		–		15	0
Ingolstadt 04	2014–15	2. Bundesliga	14	0	1	0	–		–		15	0
Ingolstadt 04	2015–16	Bundesliga	4	0	0	0	–		–		4	0
Ingolstadt 04	Total		33	0	1	0	0	0	0	0	34	0
Astana	2016	Kazakhstan Premier League	0	0	0	0	0	0	0	0	0	0
VfL Osnabrück	2016–17	3. Liga	16	2	0	0	–		–		16	2
VfL Osnabrück	2017–18	3. Liga	18	2	1	0	–		–		19	2
VfL Osnabrück	2018–19	3. Liga	24	1	0	0	–		–		24	1
VfL Osnabrück	2019–20	2. Bundesliga	4	0	0	0	–		–		4	0
VfL Osnabrück	2020–21	2. Bundesliga	0	0	0	0	–		–		0	0
VfL Osnabrück	Total		62	5	1	0	0	0	0	0	63	5
Career total			196	7	6	0	0	0	3	0	205	7

=== International ===
As of match played 13 October 2015

Appearances and goals by national team and year
National team	Year	Apps	Goals
Kazakhstan	2012	2	0
Kazakhstan	2013	4	0
Kazakhstan	2014	2	0
Kazakhstan	2015	3	0
Total		11	0
