= Serhiy Malyi =

Kazakhstani footballer (born 1990)

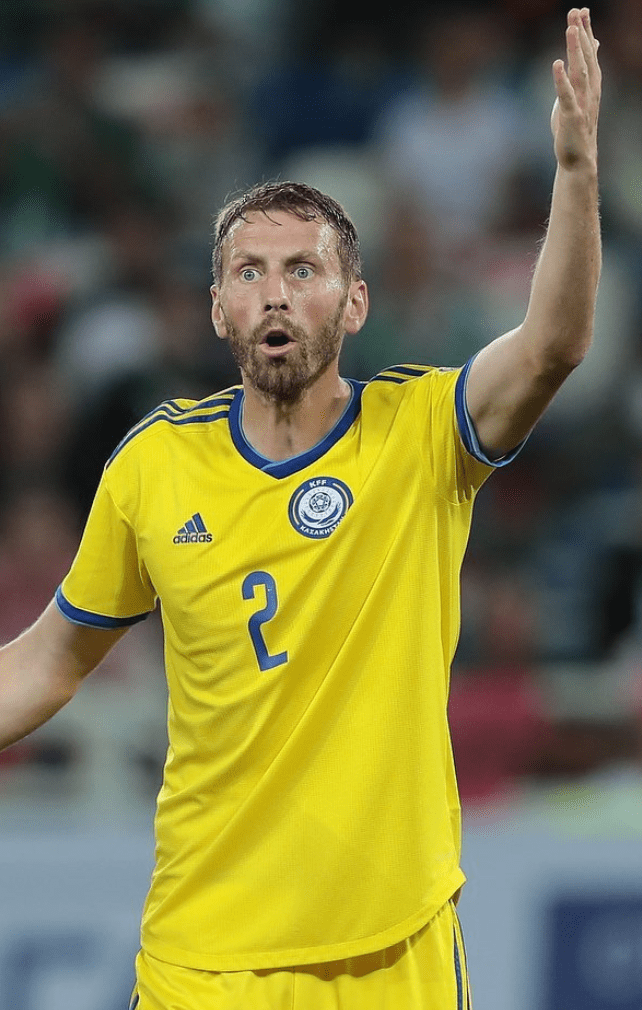
- Malyi with Kazakhstan in 2019

Personal information
- Full name: Serhiy Viktorovych Malyi
- Date of birth: 5 June 1990 (age 36)
- Place of birth: Luhansk, Ukrainian SSR, Soviet Union
- Height: 1.95 m (6 ft 5 in)
- Position: Defender

Team information
- Current team: Ordabasy
- Number: 25

Youth career
- 2003–2007: LVUFK Luhansk

Senior career*
Years	Team	Apps	(Gls)
2007–2008	Komunalnyk Luhansk	13	(0)
2008	→ Ros' Bila Tserkva (loan)	8	(1)
2008–2012	Zorya Luhansk	2	(0)
2010–2012	→ Arsenal Bila Tserkva (loan)	48	(5)
2012–2013	Arsenal Bila Tserkva	18	(1)
2013–2014	Shakhter Karagandy	46	(0)
2015	Ordabasy	22	(2)
2016	Irtysh Pavlodar	14	(2)
2016–2020	Astana	30	(2)
2017	→ Tobol (loan)	14	(2)
2019	→ Ordabasy (loan)	29	(1)
2020–2023	Tobol	69	(9)
2023–	Ordabasy	89	(16)

International career^{‡}
2011–2013	Ukraine (students)		
2014–	Kazakhstan	78	(3)
- * Club domestic league appearances and goals as of 24 October 2026 ‡ National team caps and goals as of 16:42, 16 November 2026 (UTC)

Serhiy Viktorovych Malyi (Ukrainian: Сергій Вікторович Малий; born 5 June 1990) is a professional footballer who plays as a defender for Kazakhstan Premier League club Ordabasy. Born in Ukraine, he plays for the Kazakhstan national team, for which he is the joint most capped player (Note: along with Islambek Kuat).

== Career ==
Malyi is the product of the Luhansk's sportive system. His first coach was Serhiy Kalitvintsev.

On 22 August 2011 Malyi scored a tying goal for Ukraine in the game against Thailand at the 2011 Summer Universiade in China.

During the winter of 2013 Malyi accepted Kazakh citizenship.

On 28 June 2016, Malyi moved to FC Astana.

On 11 January 2017, Malyi signed a one-year loan deal with FC Tobol. After playing for FC Ordabasy during the 2019 season, Malyi returned to Astana in January 2020. On 2 July 2020, Astana announced that Malyi had left the club after the expiration of his contract.

== Career statistics ==
=== Club ===
As of match played 15 March 2020

Appearances and goals by club, season and competition
Club	Season	League			Kazakhstan Cup		Continental		Other		Total	
Club	Season	Division	Apps	Goals	Apps	Goals	Apps	Goals	Apps	Goals	Apps	Goals
Shakhter Karagandy	2013	Kazakhstan Premier League	18	0	0	0	11 (Note: Five appearances in UEFA Champions League, six appearances in UEFA Europa League)	0	1 (Note: Appearance in Kazakhstan Super Cup)	0	30	0
Shakhter Karagandy	2014	Kazakhstan Premier League	28	0	3	0	6 (Note: Appearances in UEFA Europa League)	1	1	0	38	1
Shakhter Karagandy	Total		46	0	3	0	17	1	2	0	68	1
Ordabasy	2015	Kazakhstan Premier League	22	2	1	0	2	0	—		25	2
Irtysh Pavlodar	2016	Kazakhstan Premier League	14	2	2	0	—		—		16	2
Astana	2016	Kazakhstan Premier League	7	0	3	1	8	0	0	0	18	1
Astana	2017	Kazakhstan Premier League	3	0	0	0	2	0	0	0	5	0
Astana	2018	Kazakhstan Premier League	17	2	0	0	3 (Note: One appearance in UEFA Champions League, two appearances in UEFA Europa League)	0	0	0	20	2
Astana	2019	Kazakhstan Premier League	0	0	0	0	0	0	0	0	0	0
Astana	2020	Kazakhstan Premier League	3	0	0	0	0	0	1	0	4	0
Astana	Total		30	2	3	1	13	0	1	0	47	3
Tobol (loan)	2017	Kazakhstan Premier League	14	2	1	0	—		—		15	2
Ordabasy (loan)	2019	Kazakhstan Premier League	29	1	4	0	4	0	—		37	1
Career total			155	9	14	1	36	1	3	0	208	11

=== International ===
As of match played 16 November 2026

Appearances and goals by national team and year
National team	Year	Apps	Goals
Kazakhstan
Kazakhstan	2014	4	0
Kazakhstan	2015	8	0
Kazakhstan	2016	8	0
Kazakhstan	2017	3	0
Kazakhstan	2018	7	0
Kazakhstan	2019	11	0
Kazakhstan	2020	3	0
Kazakhstan	2021	8	0
Kazakhstan	2022	10	1
Kazakhstan	2023	5	0
Kazakhstan	2024	1	0
Kazakhstan	2025	4	0
Kazakhstan	2026	5	2
Total		78	3

Scores and results list Kazakhstan's goal tally first, score column indicates score after each Malyi goal.

List of international goals scored by Serhiy Malyi
No.	Date	Venue	Opponent	Score	Result	Competition
1	24 March 2022	Stadionul Zimbru, Chișinău, Moldova	Moldova	1–1	2–1	2020–21 UEFA Nations League C
2	9 June 2026	Nagyerdei Stadion, Debrecen, Hungary	Hungary	1–0	1–3	Friendly
3	6 October 2026	Astana Arena, Astana, Kazakhstan	Faroe Islands	1–2	2–2	2026–27 UEFA Nations League C

== Honours ==
Ordabasy

- Kazakhstan Premier League: 2026
- Kazakhstan Cup: 2026
