= Carlos Fonseca (footballer, born 1987) =

Portuguese footballer

Personal information
- Full name: Carlos Manuel Costa Fernandes Fonseca
- Date of birth: 23 August 1987 (age 39)
- Place of birth: Galegos, Portugal
- Height: 1.80 m (5 ft 11 in)
- Position: Winger

Team information
- Current team: Santa Maria

Youth career
- 1997–2003: Santa Maria
- 2003–2004: Gil Vicente
- 2004–2006: Santa Maria

Senior career*
Years	Team	Apps	(Gls)
2006–2008	Santa Maria		
2008–2010	Tirsense	56	(8)
2010–2013	Feirense	85	(7)
2013–2014	Chernomorets	24	(5)
2014–2015	Slavia Sofia	18	(5)
2015	→ Irtysh (loan)	14	(2)
2016–2020	Irtysh	113	(17)
2020–2021	Tobol	23	(0)
2021	Kyzylzhar	8	(1)
2023–	Santa Maria	84	(25)
- * Club domestic league appearances and goals as of 15:26, 29 September 2026 (UTC)

Carlos Manuel Costa Fernandes Fonseca (born 23 August 1987) is a Portuguese professional footballer who plays as a winger for Santa Maria.

== Club career ==
Born in Galegos (São Martinho), Barcelos, Fonseca played in every level of Portuguese football with the exception of the fourth division. He started with Santa Maria F.C. in the regional leagues, then moved to the third tier with F.C. Tirsense.

Fonseca signed with Segunda Liga club C.D. Feirense in summer 2010, achieving promotion and scoring one goal from 27 appearances in the process. He made his debut in the Primeira Liga on 14 August 2011, starting and being sent off at the hour-mark of a 0–0 home draw against C.D. Nacional.

Fonseca scored the first of three goals in the top flight on 6 November 2011, but in a 2–1 away loss to S.C. Beira-Mar where he again received his marching orders. The season ended in immediate relegation as second-bottom.

On 15 July 2013, Fonseca joined Bulgarian side PSFC Chernomorets Burgas following a successful one-week trial. In January 2016, he moved from PFC Slavia Sofia to Kazakhstan Premier League's FC Irtysh Pavlodar on a two-year contract after a six-month loan the previous campaign.

On 30 December 2018, Fonseca signed a new one-year deal with Irtysh. In November 2019, he agreed to a new extension.

Fonseca joined FC Tobol of the same country and league on 8 July 2020. On 2 July 2021, he left after his contract expired.

== Career statistics ==
As of match played 30 October 2021

Appearances and goals by club, season and competition
Club	Season	League			National Cup		Continental		Other		Total	
Club	Season	Division	Apps	Goals	Apps	Goals	Apps	Goals	Apps	Goals	Apps	Goals
Chernomorets	2013–14	A Group	24	5	3	1	–		–		27	6
Slavia Sofia	2014–15	A Group	18	5	1	1	–		–		19	6
Slavia Sofia	2015–16	A Group	0	0	0	0	–		–		0	0
Slavia Sofia	Total		18	5	1	1	-	-	-	-	19	6
Irtysh (loan)	2015	Kazakhstan Premier League	14	2	0	0	–		–		14	2
Irtysh	2016	Kazakhstan Premier League	28	6	3	2	–		–		31	8
Irtysh	2017	Kazakhstan Premier League	32	5	2	0	4	0	–		38	5
Irtysh	2018	Kazakhstan Premier League	26	3	1	2	2	0	2	0	31	5
Irtysh	2019	Kazakhstan Premier League	25	2	2	0	–		–		27	2
Irtysh	2020	Kazakhstan Premier League	2	1	0	0	–		–		2	1
Irtysh	Total		127	19	8	4	6	0	2	0	143	23
Tobol	2020	Kazakhstan Premier League	12	0	0	0	0	0	–		12	0
Tobol	2021	Kazakhstan Premier League	11	0	0	0	0	0	1	0	12	0
Tobol	Total		23	0	0	0	0	0	1	0	24	0
Kyzylzhar	2021	Kazakhstan Premier League	8	1	4	0	–		–		12	1
Career total			200	30	16	6	6	0	3	0	225	36

== Honours ==
Tobol

- Kazakhstan Super Cup: 2021
