= Georgas Freidgeimas =

Lithuanian footballer

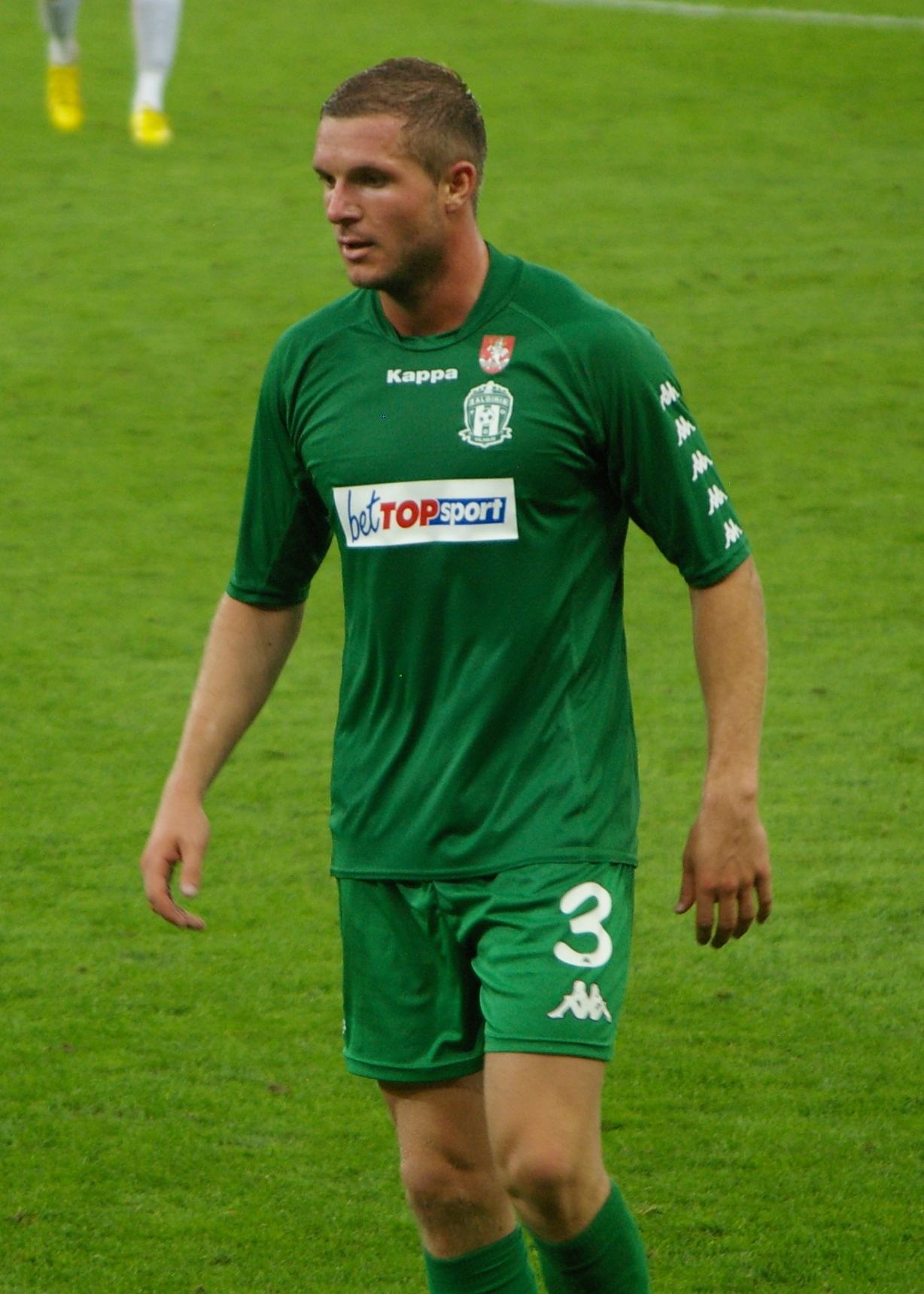
- Freidgeimas with Žalgiris Vilnius in 2013

Personal information
- Date of birth: 10 August 1987 (age 39)
- Place of birth: Kaišiadorys, Lithuanian SSR, Soviet Union
- Height: 1.85 m (6 ft 1 in)
- Position: Centre-back

Team information
- Current team: LFF (coach) & BFA (fitness coach)

Senior career*
Years	Team	Apps	(Gls)
2006–2008	Vilnius		
2008–2009	ŁKS Łódź	5	(0)
2010	Vėtra Vilnius	5	(0)
2010	Šiauliai	8	(0)
2011–2017	Žalgiris Vilnius	136	(3)
2016	→ Irtysh Pavlodar (loan)	29	(1)
2017	Okzhetpes	13	(1)
2018–2019	Žalgiris Vilnius	3	(0)
2020	Vilniaus Vytis	12	(0)

International career
2012–2017	Lithuania	28	(0)

Managerial career
- 2020–: BFA (fitness coach)
- 2021–: LFF (fitness coach)
- * Club domestic league appearances and goals

Georgas Freidgeimas (born 10 August 1987) is a Lithuanian former professional footballer who played as a centre-back.

== Playing career ==
Defender joined Žalgiris Vilnius before 2011 season and spent seven seasons in the club. On 8 February 2016, he was loaned out to Irtysh Pavlodar in the Kazakhstan Premier League.

On 15 June 2017, Freidgeimas signed for Okzhetpes Kokshetau. On 21 January 2018, he came back to Žalgiris. After 2019 season he left Žalgiris, and joined Vilniaus Vytis as a free agent.

== Coaching career ==
After a spell at Lithuanian amateur club Vilniaus Vytis, Freidgeimas retired as a player at the end of 2020. In September 2020, he was hired as an athletic coach at Baltijos Futbolo Akademija.

In February 2021, Freidgeimas also became responsible for all athletic training in the Lithuanian Football Federation, focusing mainly on work with youth teams, but also with the senior team.

== Honours ==
Žalgiris

- A Lyga: 2013, 2014, 2015
- Lithuanian Cup: 2011–12, 2012–13, 2013–14, 2014–15, 2015–16
- Lithuanian Supercup: 2013, 2017
