= Gogita Gogua =

Georgian footballer

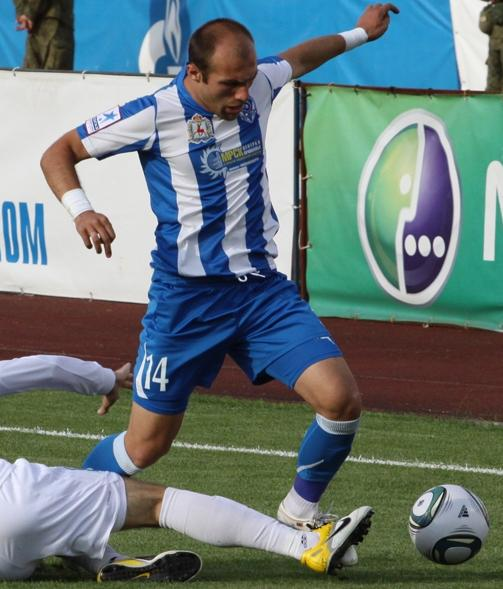
- Gogua with FC Volga Nizhny Novgorod in 2011

Personal information
- Date of birth: 4 October 1983 (age 43)
- Place of birth: Chkhorotsqu, Georgia
- Height: 1.72 m (5 ft 8 in)
- Position: Midfielder

Team information
- Current team: Samegrelo Chkhorotsku
- Number: 7

Senior career*
Years	Team	Apps	(Gls)
1999–2000	Guria Lanchkhuti	1	(0)
2001–2002	Dinamo-2 Tbilisi	12	(0)
2002–2003	Merani-91 Tbilisi	1	(0)
2003–2005	Tbilisi	41	(2)
2005	→ Dinamo Tbilisi (loan)	0	(0)
2005	Khimki	5	(0)
2006	Spartak Nalchik	23	(2)
2007	Saturn Ramenskoye	15	(0)
2008–2010	Spartak Nalchik	60	(5)
2009	→ Terek Grozny (loan)	5	(0)
2011	Volga Nizhny Novgorod	13	(1)
2012	Dinamo Tbilisi	14	(3)
2012–2013	Dila Gori	22	(2)
2013–2015	SKA-Energiya Khabarovsk	49	(9)
2015	Dila Gori	10	(1)
2016	Irtysh Pavlodar	12	(4)
2016–2017	Ordabasy	22	(2)
2017	Okzhetpes	16	(0)
2018	Kyzylzhar	11	(1)
2018	Dila Gori	14	(0)
2019	Samtredia	26	(5)
2020	Shevardeni	9	(3)
2021	Sioni Bolnisi	14	(2)
2021	Kolkheti-1913 Poti		
2022–	Samegrelo Chkhorotsku	17	(4)

International career
2004–2005	Georgia U21	4	(0)
2005–2011	Georgia	27	(1)
- * Club domestic league appearances and goals as of 18 June 2021

Gogita Gogua (Georgian: გოგიტა გოგუა; born 4 October 1983) is a Georgian footballer who plays for Samegrelo Chkhorotsku. While he mainly plays midfield, he can also play as a defender. Gogua has previously played for FC Tbilisi, Dinamo Tbilisi, FC Khimki and FC Saturn Ramenskoye. He signed in 2008 to try his second time in Spartak Nalchik, after playing 15 matches for Saturn Moscow Oblast.

== Career ==
=== Club ===
On 21 February 2016, Gogua signed for Kazakhstan Premier League side Irtysh Pavlodar, leaving Irtysh Pavlodar less than Five-months later on 7 June 2016. Three days later, on 10 June 2016, Gogua signed for fellow Kazakhstan Premier League side FC Ordabasy.

On 15 June 2017, Gogua left Ordabasy, signing for FC Okzhetpes the following day.
