= Semir Kerla =

Bosnian professional footballer (born 1987)

Personal information
- Date of birth: 26 September 1987 (age 39)
- Place of birth: Sarajevo, SFR Yugoslavia
- Height: 1.91 m (6 ft 3 in)
- Position: Centre-back

Youth career
- –2006: Radnik Hadžići

Senior career*
Years	Team	Apps	(Gls)
2006–2008	Radnik Hadžići		
2008–2010	Željezničar	17	(2)
2011	Panserraikos	6	(0)
2011	Žilina	2	(0)
2012–2014	Željezničar	42	(3)
2014–2015	Žalgiris	38	(5)
2016–2017	Irtysh Pavlodar	24	(3)
2017	Željezničar	10	(0)
2017–2021	Sūduva	93	(22)
2022–2024	Doxa Katokopias	26	(0)
2024	TOŠK Tešanj	10	(1)

International career
2010	Bosnia and Herzegovina	1	(0)
- * Club domestic league appearances and goals as of 1 June 2024

Semir Kerla (born 26 September 1987) is a Bosnian former professional footballer who played as a centre-back.

== International career ==
He made his debut for Bosnia and Herzegovina in a December 2010 friendly match against Poland in which he played the first half only. It remained his sole international appearance.

== Honours ==
Željezničar

- Bosnian Premier League: 2009–10, 2011–12, 2012–13
- Bosnian Cup: 2011–12

Žalgiris

- A Lyga: 2014, 2015
- Lithuanian Cup: 2014–15

Sūduva

- A Lyga: 2017, 2018, 2019
- Lithuanian Cup: 2019
- Lithuanian Supercup: 2018, 2019
