= 2021 Kazakhstan Super Cup =

Football tournament in Kazakhstan

Tournament details
- Host country: Kazakhstan
- City: Turkistan
- Dates: 2–6 March 2021
- Teams: 4

Tournament statistics
- Matches played: 4
- Goals scored: 13 (3.25 per match)
- Top scorer(s): Serhiy Malyi (2)

The 2021 Kazakhstan Super Cup is the 14th edition of the Kazakhstan Super Cup, an annual football competition for clubs in the Kazakh football league system that were successful in its major competitions in the preceding season.

It will be the first edition of the tournament to be played under the new format with four teams. As the 2020 Kazakhstan Cup was cancelled, the competition will feature the top four teams from the 2020 Kazakhstan Premier League season, these being champions Kairat, runners-up Tobol, third placed Astana and fourth placed Shakhter Karagandy.

== Qualification ==
=== Qualified teams ===
The following four teams qualified for the tournament.

| Team | Method of qualification | Appearance | Last appearance as | Years performance | | |
| Team | Method of qualification | Appearance | Last appearance as | Winner(s) | Runners-up | Semi-finalists |
|---|---|---|---|---|---|---|
| Kairat | 2020 Kazakhstan Premier League winners | 6th | 2018 Kazakhstan Cup winners | 2 | 3 | 1 |
| Tobol | 2020 Kazakhstan Premier League runners up | 3rd | 2010 Kazakhstan Premier League winners | 1 | 2 | – |
| Astana | 2020 Kazakhstan Premier League third place | 9th | 2019 Kazakhstan Premier League winners | 5 | 4 | – |
| Shakhter Karagandy | 2020 Kazakhstan Premier League fourth place | 4th | 2013 Kazakhstan Cup winners | 1 | 2 | 1 |

== Matches ==
=== Bracket ===
Semi-finals
2 March 2021 – Turkistan
Shakhter Karagandy | 0
Astana | 2
3 March 2021 – Turkistan
Tobol | 3(4)
Kairat | 3(2)

Final
6 March 2021 – Turkistan
Tobol | 1(5)
Astana | 1(4)
Third place
5 March 2021 – Turkistan
Kairat | 2
Shakhter Karagandy | 1

=== Semi-finals ===
2 March 2021
15:00 (UTC+6)

| Shakhter Karagandy | 0 – 2 | Astana |
|---|---|---|
| | Report | Tomašević 17'; Barseghyan 74' |

Turkistan Arena, Turkistan
Attendance: 0
Referee: Grigory Moskovchenko

3 March 2021
15:00 (UTC+6)

| Tobol | 3 – 3 | Kairat |
|---|---|---|
| Tagybergen 10'; Malyi 73'; Muzhikov 75' | Report | Kosović 40'; A.Shushenachev 67'; Alykulov 90+1' |
Penalties
| Muzhikov (penalty scored); Jovančić (penalty scored); Tagybergen (penalty scored); Lobjanidze (penalty scored) | 4 – 2 | (penalty missed) Dugalić; (penalty scored) Kosović; (penalty scored) Abiken; (penalty missed) Hovhannisyan |

Turkistan Arena, Turkistan
Attendance: 2,000
Referee: Igor Chesnokov

=== Match for third place ===
5 March 2021
15:00 (UTC+6)

| Kairat | 2 – 1 | Shakhter Karagandy |
|---|---|---|
| Palyakow 64'; Mamba 88' | Report | J-A.Payruz 52' |

Turkistan Arena, Turkistan
Attendance: 1,500
Referee: Furkat Atazhanov

=== Final ===
6 March 2021
15:00 (UTC+6)

| Tobol | 1 - 1 | Astana |
|---|---|---|
| Malyi 15' | Report | Tomasov 90+1' |
Penalties
| Muzhikov (penalty scored); Amanović (penalty scored); Tagybergen (penalty scored); Jovančić (penalty scored); Nurgaliev (penalty scored) | 5 - 4 | (penalty scored) Beisebekov; (penalty scored) Ciupercă; (penalty missed) Murtazayev; (penalty scored) Barseghyan; (penalty scored) Tomasov |

Turkistan Arena, Turkistan
Attendance: 2,000
Referee: Denis Izmailov

== See also ==
- 2021 Kazakhstan Premier League
