= 2021 FC Kairat season =

FC Kairat
2021 season
- Chairman: Kairat Boranbayev
- Manager: Aleksey Shpilevsky (until 7 June); Kirill Keker (Acting Head Coach) (7 June - 24 August); Kurban Berdyev (from 24 August)
- Stadium: Central Stadium
- Premier League: 3rd
- Kazakhstan Cup: Winners
- Super Cup: 3rd
- Champions League: Second qualifying round vs Red Star Belgrade
- Europa League: Third qualifying round vs Alashkert
- Europa Conference League: Group stage
- Top goalscorer: League: Artur Shushenachev (12); All: Artur Shushenachev (22)
- Highest home attendance: 9,500 vs Astana (24 October 2021)
- Lowest home attendance: wa0 vs Zhetysu (13 March 2021) 0 vs Taraz (5 April 2021); 0 vs Turan (10 April 2021); 0 vs Tobol (19 April 2021); 0 vs Ordabasy (29 April 2021); 0 vs Shakhter Karagandy (8 May 2021); 0 vs Atyrau (2 July 2021); 0 vs Alashkert (5 August 2021); 0 vs Zhetysu (8 August 2021) 0 vs Fola Esch (26 August 2021)
- Average home league attendance: 2,443 (25 November 2021)
Home colours	Away colours

The 2021 FC Kairat season was the 11th successive season that the club played in the Kazakhstan Premier League, the highest tier of association football in Kazakhstan, since their promotion back to the top flight in 2009. Kairat were defending Premier League Champions, and finished the season in Third place this time round. In the domestic cups, Kairat finished Third in the Super Cup and won the Kazakhstan Cup. In Europe, Kairat were knocked out of the UEFA Champions League in the Second qualifying round, the Europa League in the Third qualifying round and the Europa Conference League at the end of the group stage.

== Season events ==
On 19 January, Kairat announced the signing of Streli Mamba from SC Paderborn on a contract until 31 December 2022.

On 10 March, Kairat announced the signing of José Kanté from Legia Warsaw on a contract until 31 December 2022.

On 11 March, Kairat announced that they had extended the contract of Yerkebulan Seydakhmet until the summer of 2022, with the option of an additional year.

On 7 June, Head Coach Aleksey Shpilevsky left Kairat to join Erzgebirge Aue, with Kirill Keker being placed in temporary charge.

On 17 June, Kirill Kolesnichenko left Kairat to sign permanently for Ural Yekaterinburg.

On 6 July, Kairat announced the signing of João Paulo from Ordabasy on an 18-month contract.

On 11 July, Kairat announced the signing of Macky Bagnack on a contract until December 2023, from Partizan. Two days later, 13 July, Kairat announced the signing of Ricardo Alves on a contract until December 2022, from Krylia Sovetov.

On 24 August, Kurban Berdyev was appointed as Head Coach of Kairat, on a contract until the end of the year, with an option to extend it for an additional two-years.

== Squad ==
As of match played 10 December 2021

No.	Name	Nationality	Position	Date of birth (age)	Signed from	Signed in	Contract ends	Apps.	Goals
Goalkeepers
1	Stas Pokatilov	(Kazakhstan)	GK	8 December 1992 (aged 29)	Rostov	2017	2022	158	0
30	Danil Ustimenko	(Kazakhstan)	GK	8 August 2000 (aged 21)	Youth Team	2019	2024	14	0
72	Temirlan Anarbekov	(Kazakhstan)	GK	14 October 2003 (aged 18)	Youth Team	2020		3	0
Defenders
3	Sergey Keyler	(Kazakhstan)	DF	11 August 1994 (aged 27)	Okzhetpes	2018	2021	44	1
4	Nuraly Alip	(Kazakhstan)	DF	22 December 1999 (aged 21)	Academy	2018	2023	103	5
5	Gafurzhan Suyumbayev	(Kazakhstan)	DF	19 August 1990 (aged 31)	Ordabasy	2016		160	10
13	Kamo Hovhannisyan	(Armenia)	DF	5 October 1992 (aged 29)	Zhetysu	2020	2021	59	6
15	Macky Bagnack	(Cameroon)	DF	7 June 1995 (aged 26)	Partizan	2021	2023	21	1
20	Rade Dugalić	(Serbia)	DF	5 November 1992 (aged 29)	Yenisey Krasnoyarsk	2019	2022	95	12
24	Dino Mikanović	(Croatia)	DF	7 May 1994 (aged 27)	AGF	2019	2022	97	1
33	Dzyanis Palyakow	(Belarus)	DF	17 April 1991 (aged 30)	Ural Yekaterinburg	2020	2021	51	4
54	Lev Kurgin	(Kazakhstan)	DF	6 June 2002 (aged 19)	Academy	2020		0	0
57	Ravil Ibragimov	(Kazakhstan)	DF	25 December 2000 (aged 20)	Astana	2020		4	0
75	Alexandr Shirobokov	(Kazakhstan)	DF	2 January 2003 (aged 18)	Academy	2020		8	0
Midfielders
6	Jacek Góralski	(Poland)	MF	21 September 1992 (aged 29)	Ludogorets Razgrad	2020	2022	29	0
7	Gulzhigit Alykulov	(Kyrgyzstan)	MF	25 November 2000 (aged 21)	Neman Grodno	2020	2021(+1)	66	8
8	Aybol Abiken	(Kazakhstan)	MF	1 June 1996 (aged 25)	Academy	2015	2022	114	13
11	Yan Vorogovsky	(Kazakhstan)	MF	7 August 1996 (aged 25)	K Beerschot VA	2021		91	3
16	Ricardo Alves	(Portugal)	MF	25 March 1993 (aged 28)	Krylia Sovetov	2021	2022	22	3
22	Nebojša Kosović	(Montenegro)	MF	24 February 1995 (aged 26)	Partizan	2019	2022	71	9
23	Andrey Ulshin	(Kazakhstan)	MF	18 April 2000 (aged 21)	Academy	2020		22	3
29	Daniyar Usenov	(Kazakhstan)	MF	18 February 2001 (aged 20)	Academy	2020		33	3
36	Sagi Anet	(Kazakhstan)	MF	26 September 2002 (aged 19)	Academy	2021		5	0
46	Arsen Buranchiev	(Kazakhstan)	MF	12 September 2001 (aged 20)	Academy	2020		23	1
49	Darkhan Medelkhan	(Kazakhstan)	MF	14 August 2001 (aged 20)	Academy	2021		1	0
64	Vladislav Kravchenko	(Kazakhstan)	MF	15 April 2002 (aged 19)	Academy	2021		2	0
68	Adilet Sadybekov	(Kazakhstan)	MF	26 May 2002 (aged 19)	Academy	2021		3	0
74	Galymzhan Kenzhebek	(Kazakhstan)	MF	12 February 2003 (aged 18)	Academy	2020		3	0
81	Alexander Mrynsky	(Kazakhstan)	MF	15 July 2004 (aged 17)	Academy	2021		2	0
84	Nazar Al-Khadzh	(Kazakhstan)	MF		Academy	2021		1	0
85	Miras Omatay	(Kazakhstan)	MF		Academy	2021		2	0
Forwards
9	Vágner Love	(Brazil)	FW	11 June 1984 (aged 37)	Corinthians	2020	2021	58	27
18	José Kanté	(Guinea)	FW	27 September 1990 (aged 31)	Legia Warsaw	2021	2022	38	17
19	Artur Shushenachev	(Kazakhstan)	FW	7 April 1998 (aged 23)	Academy	2017	2022(+1)	65	27
25	João Paulo	(Brazil)	FW	2 June 1988 (aged 33)	Ordabasy	2021	2022	14	1
28	Yerkebulan Seydakhmet	(Kazakhstan)	FW	4 February 2000 (aged 21)	Ufa	2019	2022	32	1
47	Alisher Rakhimzhanov	(Kazakhstan)	FW	28 December 2003 (aged 17)	Academy	2021		3	0
Players away on loan
10	Streli Mamba	(Germany)	FW	17 June 1994 (aged 27)	SC Paderborn	2021	2022	13	2
17	Sultanbek Astanov	(Kazakhstan)	MF	23 March 1999 (aged 22)	Academy	2019		33	2
	Adam Adakhadzhiev	(Kazakhstan)	MF	23 November 1998 (aged 23)	Academy	2019	2023	10	0
	Vyacheslav Shvyrev	(Kazakhstan)	FW	7 January 2001 (aged 20)	Academy	2018		29	3
Players that left during the season
11	Aderinsola Eseola	(Ukraine)	FW	28 June 1991 (aged 30)	Zirka Kropyvnytskyi	2018	2021	84	38
21	Yerkebulan Tungyshbayev	(Kazakhstan)	MF	14 January 1995 (aged 26)	Ordabasy	2019	2021	27	0
25	Kirill Kolesnichenko	(Russia)	MF	31 January 2000 (aged 21)	Chertanovo Moscow	2020	2022	0	0
31	Dinmukhammed Zhomart	(Kazakhstan)	GK	6 December 2000 (aged 21)	Youth Team	2019		1	0
35	Denis Mitrofanov	(Kazakhstan)	FW	9 January 2002 (aged 19)	Academy	2021		6	0
	Aybar Abdulla	(Kazakhstan)	FW	22 January 2002 (aged 19)	Academy	2020		2	0

=== Out on loan ===
Note: Flags indicate national team as defined under FIFA eligibility rules; some limited exceptions apply. Players may hold more than one non-FIFA nationality.

No.	Pos.	Nation	Player
17	MF	KAZ	Sultanbek Astanov (at Ordabasy)
—	MF	KAZ	Adam Adakhadzhiev (at Zhetysu)

No.	Pos.	Nation	Player
—	FW	GER	Streli Mamba (at Hansa Rostock)
—	FW	KAZ	Vyacheslav Shvyrev (at Kairat Moscow)

== Transfers ==
=== In ===
Date	Position	Nationality	Name	From	Fee	Ref.
19 January 2021	FW	(Germany)	Streli Mamba	SC Paderborn	Undisclosed	
10 March 2021	FW	(Guinea)	José Kanté	Legia Warsaw	Free	
2 July 2021	MF	(Kazakhstan)	Yan Vorogovsky	K Beerschot VA	Undisclosed	
6 July 2021	FW	(Brazil)	João Paulo	Ordabasy	Undisclosed	
11 July 2021	DF	(Cameroon)	Macky Bagnack	Partizan	Undisclosed	
13 July 2021	MF	(Portugal)	Ricardo Alves	Krylia Sovetov	Undisclosed	

=== Out ===
Date	Position	Nationality	Name	To	Fee	Ref.
2 March 2021	FW	(Kazakhstan)	Vyacheslav Shvyrev	Akzhayik	Undisclosed	
12 March 2021	FW	(Kazakhstan)	Yerkebulan Tungyshbayev	Ordabasy	Undisclosed	
17 June 2021	MF	(Russia)	Kirill Kolesnichenko	Ural Yekaterinburg	Undisclosed	
14 July 2021	GK	(Kazakhstan)	Dinmukhammed Zhomart	Kairat Moscow	Undisclosed	
14 July 2021	FW	(Kazakhstan)	Aybar Abdulla	Kairat Moscow	Undisclosed	

=== Loans out ===
Date from	Position	Nationality	Name	To	Date to	Ref.
3 September 2020	MF	(Russia)	Kirill Kolesnichenko	Rotor Volgograd	30 June 2021	
27 February 2021	FW	(Kazakhstan)	Vyacheslav Shvyrev	Akzhayik	4 July 2022	
14 June 2021	FW	(Germany)	Streli Mamba	Hansa Rostock	30 June 2022	
10 July 2021	MF	(Kazakhstan)	Sultanbek Astanov	Ordabasy	31 December 2021	
14 July 2021	FW	(Kazakhstan)	Vyacheslav Shvyrev	Kairat Moscow	30 June 2022	

=== Released ===
Date	Position	Nationality	Name	Joined	Date	Ref.
30 June 2021	FW	(Ukraine)	Aderinsola Eseola	Vorskla Poltava	2 July 2021	
31 December 2021	DF	(Croatia)	Dino Mikanović	Hajduk Split	28 January 2022	
31 December 2021	DF	(Serbia)	Rade Dugalić	Meizhou Hakka		
31 December 2021	MF	(Montenegro)	Nebojša Kosović	Meizhou Hakka		
31 December 2021	FW	(Brazil)	Vágner Love	Midtjylland	20 January 2022	

== Friendlies ==
4 February 2021	Kairat (Kazakhstan)	0 – 2	(Russia) Dynamo Moscow	Belek, Turkey
16:00 (UTC+6)	Kosović (yellow card) 39'; Mikanović (yellow card) 51'; Polyakov (yellow card) 79'	Report	Yevgenyev (yellow card) 19'; Igboun 40'; Neustädter 48'; Moskvichyov (yellow card) 54'	Stadium: Regnum Carya

6 February 2021	Kairat (Kazakhstan)	2 – 3	(Russia) Krylia Sovetov	Belek, Turkey
14:30 (UTC+6)	Kosović 51'; Abiken 53' (pen.)	Report	Gorshkov 15'; Zinkovsky 29'; Sergeyev 47'

6 February 2021	Kairat (Kazakhstan)	–	(Ukraine) Oleksandriya	Belek, Turkey
(UTC+6)

9 February 2021	Kairat (Kazakhstan)	0 – 2	(Belarus) Rukh Brest	Belek, Turkey
14:00 (UTC+6)		Report	K.Chernook 57'; Sadovsky 89'

9 February 2021	Kairat (Kazakhstan)	2 – 2	(Montenegro) Budućnost Podgorica	Belek, Turkey
20:00 (UTC+6)	Shushenachev 50'; A.Abdulla 82'	Report	Božović 12'; Ivanović 76'

17 February 2021	Kairat (Kazakhstan)	3 – 1	(Russia) Chayka Peschanokopskoye	Belek, Turkey
20:00 (UTC+6)	Shushenachev 16', 75'; A.Ulshin (yellow card) 48'	Report	Orazov 79'

19 February 2021	Kairat (Kazakhstan)	0 – 2	(Russia) Nizhny Novgorod	Belek, Turkey
20:00 (UTC+6)		Report	Gorbunov 65'; Gotsuk 86'

21 February 2021	Kairat (Kazakhstan)	0 – 1	(Russia) Rubin Kazan	Belek, Turkey
18:00 (UTC+6)		Report	Kvaratskhelia 11'; Samoshnikov (red card) 42'; S.Surikov (red card) 86'

23 February 2021	Kairat (Kazakhstan)	4 – 0	(Russia) Rotor Volgograd	Belek, Turkey
20:00 (UTC+6)	Alykulov 2', 32'; Shushenachev 22'; A.Buranchiev 83'	Report

== Competitions ==
=== Overview ===
Competition	First match	Last match	Starting round	Final position	Record							
Competition	First match	Last match	Starting round	Final position	Pld	W	D	L	GF	GA	GD	Win %
Premier League	12 March 2021	29 October 2021	Matchday 1	3rd	26	14	9	3	52	21	+31	53.85
Kazakhstan Cup	10 July 2021	28 November 2021	Group Stage	Champions	11	7	1	3	25	12	+13	63.64
Super Cup	3 March 2021	5 March 2021	Semifinal	Third	2	1	1	0	5	4	+1	50.00
UEFA Champions League	7 July 2021	29 July 2021	First Qualifying Round	Second Qualifying Round	4	2	1	1	5	7	−2	50.00
UEFA Europa League	5 August 2021	12 August 2021	Third Qualifying Round	Third Qualifying Round	2	0	1	1	2	3	−1	0.00
UEFA Europa Conference League	19 August 2021	10 December 2021	Playoff Round	Group Stage	8	2	2	4	13	13	+0	25.00
Total					53	26	15	12	102	60	+42	49.06

Last updated: 10 December 2021
Source: Competitions

=== Super Cup ===
3 March 2021 Semi-final	Tobol	3–3 (4–2 p)	Kairat	Turkistan
15:00 (UTC+6)	Malyi (yellow card) 19' (goal) 73'; Tagybergen 10'; Muzhikov 75'	Report	Alip (yellow card) 32' (yellow-red card) 90+5'; Kosović 40'; Mikanović (yellow card) 59'; Shushenachev 67'; Usenov (yellow card) 78'; Alykulov 90+1'	Stadium: Turkistan Arena; Attendance: 2,000; Referee: Igor Chesnokov
	Penalties
	Muzhikov (penalty scored); Jovančić (penalty scored); Tagybergen (penalty scored); Lobjanidze (penalty scored)		(penalty missed) Dugalić; (penalty scored) Kosović; (penalty scored) Abiken; (penalty missed) Hovhannisyan

5 March 2021 Third place	Kairat	2–1	Shakhter Karagandy	Turkistan
15:00 (UTC+6)	Ustimenko (yellow card) 51'; Palyakow 64'; Mamba 88'; S.Keyler (yellow card) 90+3'	Report	J-A.Payruz (yellow card) 26' (goal) 52'; Y.Kybyray (yellow card) 61'; M.Gabyshev (yellow card) 90+3'	Stadium: Turkistan Arena; Attendance: 1,500; Referee: Furkat Atazhanov

=== Premier League ===
==== Results summary ====
Overall								Home						Away					
Pld	W	D	L	GF	GA	GD	Pts	W	D	L	GF	GA	GD	W	D	L	GF	GA	GD
26	14	9	3	52	21	+31	51	10	3	0	35	10	+25	4	6	3	17	11	+6

Last updated: 30 October 2021.
Source: See Results

==== Results by round ====
Round	1	2	3	4	5	6	7	8	9	10	11	12	13	14	15	16	17	18	19	20	21	22	23	24	25	26
Ground	H	A	H	H	A	H	A	H	A	H	A	H	A	H	A	A	H	A	H	A	H	A	H	A	H	A
Result	W	W	D	W	D	D	L	W	D	D	L	W	D	W	W	W	W	D	W	L	W	D	W	W	W	D
Position	1	1	1	1	2	3	5	3	4	3	4	4	3	3	3	3	3	3	3	3	3	3	3	3	3	3

Source: See Results
A = Away; H = Home; W = Win; D = Draw; L = Loss

==== League table ====
Pos	Team	Pld	W	D	L	GF	GA	GD	Pts	Qualification or relegation
1	Tobol (C)	26	18	7	1	54	18	+36	61	Qualification for the Champions League first qualifying round
2	Astana	26	17	6	3	53	25	+28	57	Qualification for the Europa Conference League second qualifying round
3	Kairat	26	14	9	3	52	21	+31	51	Qualification for the Europa Conference League second qualifying round
4	Kyzylzhar	26	11	6	9	32	24	+8	39	Qualification for the Europa Conference League second qualifying round
5	Ordabasy	26	10	8	8	36	35	+1	38	

Source: UEFA, Soccerway
Rules for classification: 1) Points; 2) Goal difference; 3) Matches won; 4) Goals scored; 5) Away goals scored; 6) Head-to-head points; 7) Head-to-head matches won; 8) Head-to-head goal difference; 9) Head-to-head goals scored; 10) Head-to-head away goals scored; 11) Draw.
(C) Champions

==== Results ====
13 March 2021 1	Kairat	2–0	Zhetysu	Almaty
15:00 (UTC+6)	Palyakow (red card) 49'; Kosović 69'; Alykulov 72'	Report	A.Dzhanuzakov (yellow card) 36'; P.Ipole (yellow card) 60'; Poyarkov (yellow card) 67'; Kislitsyn (yellow card) 81'	Stadium: Central Stadium; Attendance: 0 Referee: Timur Kumashev
Note: Match played behind closed doors due to the COVID-19 pandemic in Kazakhstan.

19 March 2021 2	Kaisar	0–3	Kairat	Kyzylorda
16:00 (UTC+6)	Narzildaev (yellow card) 6' (yellow-red card) 38'	Report	Vágner Love 45+3'; Hovhannisyan 62'; Usenov 77'	Stadium: Gani Muratbayev Stadium; Attendance: 1,300; Referee: Zhandos Abzhan

5 April 2021 3	Kairat	2–2	Taraz	Almaty
17:00 (UTC+6)	Abiken (yellow card) 42'; Kanté 55'; Vágner Love 66'; Dugalić (yellow card) 90+4'	Report	Eugénio 9'; B.Aitbayev (yellow card) 29'; B.Baytana 36' (yellow card) 79'; Akhmetov (yellow card) 56'	Stadium: Central Stadium; Attendance: 0 Referee: Grigory Moskovchenko
Note: Match played behind closed doors due to the COVID-19 pandemic in Kazakhstan.

10 April 2021 4	Kairat	5–1	Turan	Almaty
17:00 (UTC+6)	Abiken 2', 30'; Hovhannisyan 5'; Mikanović (yellow card) 12'; Kanté (yellow card) 33' (goal) 43'; Eseola 90+1'	Report	Janković (red card) 38'; B.Beysenov (yellow card) 60'; T.Amirov (yellow card) 82'; K.Taipov 90'	Stadium: Central Stadium; Attendance: 0 Referee: Bulat Sariev
Note: Match played behind closed doors due to the COVID-19 pandemic in Kazakhstan.

14 April 2021 5	Caspiy	1–1	Kairat	Aktau
15:00 (UTC+6)	Mingazow 33'; R.Sakhalbaev (yellow card) 37'; M.Taykenov (yellow card) 73'	Report	Alip (yellow card) 21'; Abiken (yellow card) 29' (yellow-red card) 36'; Pokatilov (yellow card) 37'; Alykulov (yellow card) 37'; Palyakow 41'; Kosović (yellow card) 90+5'	Stadium: Zhastar Stadium; Attendance: 1,000; Referee: Denis Tevyashov

19 April 2021 6	Kairat	2–2	Tobol	Almaty
19:00 (UTC+6)	Kanté 20', 68'; Hovhannisyan (yellow card) 25' (yellow-red card) 80'	Report	Nurgaliev 3'; S.Zharynbetov (yellow card) 54'; Valiullin (yellow card) 63'; Nikolić 70'; Tagybergen (yellow card) 72'	Stadium: Central Stadium; Attendance: 0 Referee: Igor Chesnokov
Note: Match played behind closed doors due to the COVID-19 pandemic in Kazakhstan.

23 April 2021 7	Atyrau	1–0	Kairat	Atyrau
18:00 (UTC+6)	A.Ersalimov (yellow card) 45+1'; Z.Kairkenov 47'; Kunić (yellow card) 60'; D.Kayralliev (yellow card) 73'	Report	Palyakow (yellow card) 90+1'	Stadium: Munaishy Stadium; Attendance: 0 Referee: Alexander Zatula
Note: Match played behind closed doors due to the COVID-19 pandemic in Kazakhstan.

29 April 2021 8	Kairat	3–0	Ordabasy	Almaty
19:00 (UTC+6)	S.Keyler (yellow card) 6'; Vágner Love (yellow card) 24' (yellow-red card) 24'; Eseola 61'; Abiken (yellow card) 65'; Pokatilov (yellow card) 85'; Mamba 88'; Kanté 90+4'	Report	Tungyshbayev 13'; Astanov 45'	Stadium: Central Stadium; Attendance: 0 Referee: Artem Kuchin
Note: Match played behind closed doors due to the COVID-19 pandemic in Kazakhstan.

3 May 2021 9	Kyzylzhar	1–1	Kairat	Petropavl
16:00 (UTC+6)	Murachyov (yellow card) 42'; Karshakevich (yellow card) 71'; Batyrkanov (yellow card) 73'; A.Kasym 78' (yellow card) 84'; Podio (yellow card) 90+2'	Report	Palyakow 28'	Stadium: Karasai Stadium; Attendance: 1,500; Referee: Denis Tevyashov

8 May 2021 10	Kairat	1-1	Shakhter Karagandy	Almaty
19:00 (UTC+6)	Shushenachev 51'	Report	D.Atanaskoski (yellow card) 29'; Najaryan (yellow card) 42'; Mitošević (yellow card) 74'; Alip 90+4' (o.g.)	Stadium: Central Stadium; Attendance: 0 Referee: Bolat Karlibaev
Note: Match played behind closed doors due to the COVID-19 pandemic in Kazakhstan.

14 May 2021 11	Akzhayik	1–0	Kairat	Oral
16:00 (UTC+6)	Nazarenko 53'	Report	Dugalić (yellow card) 55'; Suyumbayev (yellow card) 70'	Stadium: Petr Atoyan Stadium; Attendance: 0 Referee: Sergey Nozhenko
Note: Match played behind closed doors due to the COVID-19 pandemic in Kazakhstan.

18 May 2021 12	Kairat	4–2	Aktobe	Almaty
19:00 (UTC+6)	Shushenachev 7', 36'; Kanté 51'; Dugalić (yellow card) 73'; Kosović 86'	Report	Manucharyan (yellow card) 15'; A.Tanzharikov (yellow card) 30'; Moukam (yellow card) 40' (goal) 54'; Zhalmukan 41'; Nurgaliyev (yellow card) 52'	Stadium: Central Stadium; Attendance: 4,600; Referee: Bulat Sariev

23 May 2021 13	Astana	1–1	Kairat	Nur-Sultan
21:00 (UTC+6)	Haroyan (yellow card) 30'; Ciupercă (yellow card) 35'; Rukavina (yellow card) 36'; Beisebekov (yellow card) 40'; Tomasov (yellow card) 80'; Kuat (yellow card) 82'; Barseghyan 87'	Report	Abiken (yellow card) 25'; Alykulov (yellow card) 63'; Suyumbayev 90+1'	Stadium: Astana Arena; Attendance: 5,500; Referee: Denis Izmailov

28 May 2021 14	Kairat	1–0	Kaisar	Almaty
19:00 (UTC+6)	Kanté 33'; Seydakhmet (yellow card) 90+1'	Report	B.Kurmanbekuly (yellow card) 44'; B.Shadmanov (yellow card) 66'	Stadium: Central Stadium; Attendance: 4,000; Referee: Sergey Nozhenko

13 June 2021 15	Taraz	0–2	Kairat	Taraz
19:00 (UTC+6)	Akhmetov (yellow card) 14'; Baytana (yellow card) 33'; Shakhmetov (yellow card) 38'; Eugénio (yellow card) 45+3'	Report	Vágner Love 11'; Palyakow (yellow card) 18'; Abiken (yellow card) 33'; S.Astanov (yellow card) 45+1'; Shushenachev 67'; Seydakhmet (yellow card) 89'	Stadium: Central Stadium; Attendance: 3,500; Referee: Igor Chesnokov

19 June 2021 16	Turan	0–3	Kairat	Turkistan
21:00 (UTC+6)	B.Beysenov (yellow card) 38'; Janković (yellow card) 68'	Report	Vágner Love 13' (pen.); Kosović (yellow card) 45+1'; Palyakow (yellow card) 45+3'; Shushenachev 47'; A.Buranchiev 75'	Stadium: Turkistan Arena; Attendance: 1,400; Referee: Bayimbet Saken

23 June 2021 17	Kairat	5–1	Caspiy	Almaty
19:00 (UTC+6)	Shushenachev 8'; Vágner Love 25', 71'; Hovhannisyan 83'; Alykulov 90'	Report	Mingazow 73' (yellow card) 80'	Stadium: Central Stadium; Attendance: 6,000; Referee: Bolat Karlibaev

28 June 2021 18	Tobol	2–2	Kairat	Kostanay
19:00 (UTC+6)	Tagybergen (yellow card) 17'; Valiullin 53' (yellow card) 59'; Dugalić 66' (o.g.); Muzhikov (red card) 73'	Report	Shushenachev 23'; Abiken (yellow card) 52'; Kosović (yellow card) 54'; Kanté (yellow card) 75'; Vágner Love 76'	Stadium: Central Stadium; Attendance: 3,500; Referee: Artem Kuchin

2 July 2021 19	Kairat	5–0	Atyrau	Almaty
19:00 (UTC+6)	Shushenachev 29', 59'; Kanté 57'; Alykulov 69'; Hovhannisyan 90+2'	Report	Alex Bruno (yellow card) 52'; Ayrapetyan (yellow card) 78'	Stadium: Central Stadium; Attendance: 0 Referee: Alexander Gauser
Note: Match played behind closed doors due to the COVID-19 pandemic in Kazakhstan.

12 September 2021 20	Ordabasy	2–1	Kairat	Shymkent
19:00 (UTC+6)	Diakate 10'; Kleshchenko 31'; S.Shamshi (yellow card) 81'	Report	Abiken (red card) 36'; Kanté 73' (yellow card) 79'	Stadium: Kazhymukan Munaitpasov Stadium; Attendance: 1,500; Referee: Denis Tevyashov

19 September 2021 21	Kaiart	1–0	Kyzylzhar	Almaty
19:00 (UTC+6)	Mikanović (yellow card) 10'; Bagnack (yellow card) 46'; Shushenachev 77'; Vágner Love (yellow card) 79'; Alves (yellow card) 90+4'	Report	D.Shmidt (yellow card) 58'	Stadium: Central Stadium; Attendance: 900; Referee: Alexander Zatula

26 September 2021 22	Shakhter Karagandy	1–1	Kairat	Karaganda
20:00 (UTC+6)	Gabyshev (yellow card) 21'; Lamanje (yellow card) 69'; Umayev 77'	Report	Alip (yellow card) 41'; Bagnack (yellow card) 63'; Kanté (yellow card) 67'; Dugalić 89'	Stadium: Shakhter Stadium; Attendance: 2,500; Referee: Alexander Gauser

3 October 2021 2021 23	Kairat	3–1	Akzhayik	Almaty
18:00 (UTC+6)	João Paulo 17'; Kosović 30'; Shushenachev 62'	Report	Takulov (yellow card) 28'; L.Imnadze 89'	Stadium: Central Stadium; Attendance: 1,300; Referee: Saken Bayimbet

16 October 2021 24	Aktobe	1–2	Kairat	Aktobe
19:00 (UTC+6)	Logvinenko (yellow card) 52'; Shomko (yellow card) 59'; Jeřábek (yellow card) 70'; Alip 73' (o.g.)	Report	Shushenachev 31'; Alykulov 41'; Alip (yellow card) 45'; Dugalić (yellow card) 45+1' (yellow-red card) 90+3'; João Paulo (yellow card) 78'	Stadium: Central Stadium; Attendance: 8,200; Referee: Alexander Zatula

24 October 2021 25	Kairat	1–0	Astana	Almaty
15:00 (UTC+6)	Kosović 8'; Alves (yellow card) 20'; João Paulo (yellow card) 39'; Vágner Love (yellow card) 85'; Alip (yellow card) 90+3'	Report	Barseghyan (yellow card) 15'; Rukavina (yellow card) 37'; Tomašević (yellow card) 78'	Stadium: Central Stadium; Attendance: 9,500; Referee: Igor Chesnokov

30 October 2021 26	Zhetysu	0–0	Kairat	Taldıqorğan
14:00 (UTC+6)	Kavlinov (yellow card) 34'; Zhaksylykov (yellow card) 77'	Report		Stadium: Zhetysu Stadium; Attendance: 2,000; Referee: Danil Gorda

=== Kazakhstan Cup ===
==== Group stage ====
Pos	Team	Pld	W	D	L	GF	GA	GD	Pts	Qualification
1	Caspiy (A)	6	4	1	1	10	4	+6	13	Advanced to Quarterfinals
2	Kairat (A)	6	3	0	3	11	9	+2	9	Advanced to Quarterfinals
3	Zhetysu	6	2	1	3	3	5	−2	7	
4	Turan	6	2	0	4	5	11	−6	6	

Updated to match(es) played on 15 August 2021. Source: PFLK
(A) Advance to a further round

10 July 2021 1	Zhetysu	0 – 1	Kairat	Taldıqorğan
18:00 (UTC+6)	Ablitarov (yellow card) 51'	Report	A.Ulshin 10'; A.Buranchiev (yellow card) 25'; Alykulov (yellow card) 71'; S.Keiler (yellow card) 90+5'	Stadium: Zhetysu Stadium; Attendance: 0 Referee: Nariman Talapkerov
Note: Match played behind closed doors.

17 July 2021 2	Kairat	0 – 2	Caspiy	Almaty
19:00 (UTC+6)	Seydakhmet (yellow card) 30'; Ustimenko (red card) 32'; S.Keiler (yellow card) 65'; A.Buranchiev (yellow card) 73'	Report	Cuckić 39' (yellow card) 58'; T.Kusyapov (yellow card) 43'; Zaleski 54'; Tigroudja (yellow card) 82'; M.Tuliev (yellow card) 90+2'	Stadium: Central Stadium; Attendance: 1,500; Referee: Denis Izmailov

24 July 2021 3	Kairat	0 – 1	Turan	Almaty
19:00 (UTC+6)	A.Ulshin (yellow card) 24'; Seydakhmet (yellow card) 34'	Report	Chizh (yellow card) 38'; Stanley 68'; Zaleski (yellow card) 90+5'	Stadium: Central Stadium; Attendance: 1,5000; Referee: Danil Gorda

31 July 2021 4	Turan	4 – 3	Kairat	Turkistan
20:00 (UTC+6)	A.Buranchiev (yellow card) 6'; Shushenachev 12'; Alykulov 14'; A.Ulshin 19'; M.Omatay (yellow card) 83'	Report	M.Tolebek (yellow card) 41' (goal) 53'; D.Omarov 57'; Stanley 66', 86'; Musabekov (yellow card) 71'	Stadium: Turkistan Arena; Attendance: 0 Referee: Elvira Nurmustafina
Note: Match played behind closed doors due to the COVID-19 pandemic in Kazakhstan.

8 August 2021 5	Kairat	3 – 0	Zhetysu	Almaty
19:00 (UTC+6)	Shushenachev 4', 18' (yellow card) 38'; Dugalić 61'	Report		Stadium: Central Stadium; Attendance: 0 Referee: Bulat Sariev
Note: Match played behind closed doors due to the COVID-19 pandemic in Kazakhstan.

15 August 2021 6	Caspiy	2 – 4	Kairat	Aktau
20:00 (UTC+6)	Tigroudja 41' (yellow card) 54'; Karimov 45+1'; A.Nabikhanov (yellow card) 45+3'; Zaleski (yellow card) 68'; Mingazow (yellow card) 74'	Report	Dugalić 6', 34' (yellow card) 23'; Abiken 9'; Kanté 44'; Hovhannisyan (yellow card) 45+3'; A.Buranchiev (yellow card) 90+2'	Stadium: Zhastar Stadium; Attendance: 0 Referee: Maxim Bogdanov
Note: Match played behind closed doors due to the COVID-19 pandemic in Kazakhstan.

==== Knockout stages ====
22 September 2021 Quarterfinal 1st leg	Kairat	3 – 0	Kaisar	Almaty
19:00 (UTC+6)	Alves (yellow card) 12' (goal) 90+3'; Vágner Love 40'; Kanté 74'	Report	Kenesov (yellow card) 73'	Stadium: Central Stadium; Attendance: 1,000; Referee: Denis Izmailov

27 October 2021 Quarterfinal 2nd leg	Kaisar	0 – 2 (0 – 5 agg.)	Kairat	Kyzylorda
19:00 (UTC+6)	N.Salaidin (yellow card) 59'; O.Makhan (yellow card) 72'; Bimenyimana (yellow card) 83'	Report	Vorogovsky (yellow card) 38'; Vágner Love 76'; Shushenachev 88'	Stadium: Gani Muratbayev Stadium; Attendance: 1,500; Referee: Anton Kuchma

7 November 2021 Semifinal 1st leg	Astana	0 – 3	Kairat	Nur-Sultan
18:00 (UTC+6)	Tomašević (yellow card) 35'; Bećiraj (yellow card) 56'; A.Adilov (yellow card) 90+3'; Prokopenko (yellow card) 90+4'	Report	Dugalić 45+7'; Kanté 67'; Shushenachev 71'; Abiken (yellow card) 85'	Stadium: Astana Arena; Attendance: 3,000; Referee: Alexander Gauser

20 November 2021 Semifinal 2nd leg	Kairat	3 – 0 (6 – 0 agg.)	Astana	Almaty
15:00 (UTC+6)	Dugalić (yellow card) 22' (yellow-red card) 58'; M.Kalmyrza 64' (o.g.); Kanté 80'; Vágner Love 86'	Report	S.Sagnayev (yellow card) 39'; Bećiraj (yellow card) 41'; Kuat (yellow card) 56'; M.Kalmyrza (yellow card) 61' (red card) 69'; Bitri (yellow card) 64'	Stadium: Central Stadium; Attendance: 2,000; Referee: Artem Kuchin

==== Final ====
28 November 2021	Kairat	3 – 3 (9 – 8 p)	Shakhter Karagandy	Nur-Sultan
20:30 (UTC+6)	Vágner Love 6', 40'; Kanté (yellow card) 107'; Shushenachev 110'	Report	Gabyshev 48'; Bukorac (yellow card) 69'; Toshev 75'; Mawutor (yellow card) 82'; Y.Kybyrai (yellow card) 93'; Tattybayev 97' (pen.); Umayev (yellow card) 103'	Stadium: Astana Arena; Attendance: 4,000; Referee: Igor Chesnokov
	Penalties
	Abiken (penalty scored); Alykulov (penalty scored); Alves (penalty scored); Góralski (penalty scored); Alip (penalty missed); Shushenachev (penalty scored); Vorogovsky (penalty scored); Bagnack (penalty scored); Palyakow (penalty scored); Hovhannisyan (penalty scored)		(penalty scored) Graf; (penalty scored) Mawutor; (penalty missed) Y.Kybyrai; (penalty scored) Umayev; (penalty scored) Tattybayev; (penalty scored) Lamanje; (penalty scored) Najaryan; (penalty scored) Khozin; (penalty scored) Shatsky; (penalty missed) Nazimkhanov

=== UEFA Champions League ===
==== Qualifying rounds ====
7 July 2021 First Qualifying Round 1st leg	Maccabi Haifa (Israel)	1 – 1	(Kazakhstan) Kairat	Haifa, Israel
23:00 (UTC+6)	Donyoh (yellow card) 22'; Abu Fani (yellow card) 38'; Atzili 45'	Report	Alip 76'; Usenov (yellow card) 86'; Mikanović (yellow card) 90+1'; Alykulov (yellow card) 90+4'	Stadium: Sammy Ofer Stadium; Attendance: 25,200; Referee: Milovan Milačić (Montenegro)

14 July 2021 First Qualifying Round 2nd leg	Kairat (Kazakhstan)	2 – 0 (2 – 0 agg.)	(Israel) Maccabi Haifa	Almaty, Kazakhstan
20:00 (UTC+6)	Vágner Love 10' (yellow card) 90+7'; Hovhannisyan (yellow card) 38'; Suyumbayev (yellow card) 61'; Abiken 66' (yellow card) 73'; S.Keyler (red card) 90+2'	Report	Abu Fani (yellow card) 27'; Atzili (yellow card) 61'; Donyoh (yellow card) 90'; Mohamed (red card) 90+2'	Stadium: Central Stadium; Attendance: 7,952; Referee: Viktor Kopiievskyi (Ukraine)

21 July 2021 Second Qualifying Round 1st leg	Kairat (Kazakhstan)	2 – 1	(Serbia) Red Star Belgrade	Almaty, Kazakhstan
20:00 (UTC+6)	Kanté 24'; Shushenachev (yellow card) 42'; A.Buranchiev (yellow card) 51'; Bagnack 79' (yellow card) 90+3'	Report	Katai (yellow card) 20'; Mikanović 57' (o.g.); Borjan (yellow card) 81'	Stadium: Central Stadium; Attendance: 7,000; Referee: Halil Umut Meler (Turkey)

29 July 2021 Second Qualifying Round 2nd leg	Red Star Belgrade (Serbia)	5 – 0 (6 – 2 agg.)	(Kazakhstan) Kairat	Belgrade, Serbia
00:30 (UTC+6)	Katai 9', 42'; Diony 21'; Ivanić 49'; Gobeljić (yellow card) 50'; Falco 56'; Lazetić (yellow card) 90+4'	Report	Hovhannisyan (yellow card) 82'; Alip (yellow card) 90+4'	Stadium: Red Star Stadium; Attendance: 11,000; Referee: Andris Treimanis (Latvia)

=== UEFA Europa League ===
==== Qualifying rounds ====
5 August 2021 Third qualifying round 1st leg	Kairat (Kazakhstan)	0 – 0	(Armenia) Alashkert	Almaty, Kazakhstan
20:00 (UTC+6)	Dugalić (yellow card) 35'; Alykulov (yellow card) 45'; Alip (yellow card) 78'; Usenov (yellow card) 90'	Report	Glišić (penalty missed) 36'; Grigoryan (yellow card) 45'	Stadium: Central Stadium; Attendance: 0 Referee: Aleksei Kulbakov (Belarus)
Note: Match played behind closed doors due to the COVID-19 pandemic in Kazakhstan

12 August 2021 Third qualifying round 2nd leg	Alashkert (Armenia)	3 – 2 (a.e.t.) (3 – 2 agg.)	(Kazakhstan) Kairat	Yerevan, Armenia
21:00 (UTC+6)	Embaló 43', 50'; Boljević (yellow card) 59'; Grigoryan (yellow card) 90+4'; Glišić 103' (yellow card) 104'; Čančarević (yellow card) 120+1'	Report	Alip (yellow card) 33'; Abiken 45+1' (yellow card) 91' (red card) 91'; Dugalić (yellow card) 47'; Kanté (yellow card) 54'; Shushenachev 61'; Palyakow (red card) 62'; A.Buranchiev (yellow card) 115'	Stadium: Republican Stadium; Attendance: 7,000; Referee: Lawrence Visser (Belgium)
Note: Match played at the Vazgen Sargsyan Republican Stadium in Yerevan, instead of Alashkert's regular stadium Alashkert Stadium, Yerevan, which did not meet UEFA requirements.

=== UEFA Europa Conference League ===
==== Qualifying rounds ====
19 August 2021 Playoff round 1st leg	Fola Esch (Luxembourg)	1 – 4	(Kazakhstan) Kairat	Luxembourg City, Luxembourg
23:30 (UTC+6)	M.Mustafić 19'; B.Frere (yellow card) 33'	Report	Vorogovsky (yellow card) 25'; Shushenachev 28'; Vágner Love 37', 70' (pen.); Alves 43'; A.Buranchiev (yellow card) 66'; Mikanović (yellow card) 76'	Stadium: Stade Josy Barthel; Attendance: 880; Referee: Fábio Veríssimo (Portugal)

26 August 2021 Playoff round 2nd leg	Kairat (Kazakhstan)	3 – 1 (7 – 2 agg.)	(Luxembourg) Fola Esch	Almaty, Kazakhstan
20:00 (UTC+6)	Shushenachev 12', 36'; Vágner Love 28'; Abiken (yellow card) 46'	Report	B.Correia (yellow card) 4'; Ouassiero (yellow card) 14'; Mustafić 43'	Stadium: Central Stadium; Attendance: 0 Referee: Fran Jović (Croatia)
Note: Match played behind closed doors due to the COVID-19 pandemic in Kazakhstan

==== Group stage ====
Pos	Team	Pld	W	D	L	GF	GA	GD	Pts	Qualification
1	(Switzerland) Basel	6	4	2	0	14	6	+8	14	Advance to round of 16
2	(Azerbaijan) Qarabağ	6	3	2	1	10	8	+2	11	Advance to knockout round play-offs
3	(Cyprus) Omonia	6	0	4	2	5	10	−5	4	
4	(Kazakhstan) Kairat	6	0	2	4	6	11	−5	2	

Source: UEFA
Rules for classification: Group stage tiebreakers

16 September 2021 1	Kairat (Kazakhstan)	0 – 0	(Cyprus) Omonia	Almaty, Kazakhstan
20:30 (UTC+6)	Kanté (yellow card) 40'; Alves (yellow card) 49'; Bagnack (yellow card) 72'	Report	Gómez (yellow card) 35'; Yuste (yellow card) 68'	Stadium: Central Stadium; Attendance: 7,038; Referee: Serhiy Boiko (Ukraine)

1 October 2021 2	Basel (Switzerland)	4 – 2	(Kazakhstan) Kairat	Basel, Switzerland
01:00 (UTC+6)	Arthur 15'; Lang 21', 40'; Ndoye 49'; Frei (yellow card) 50'; Djiga (yellow card) 68'	Report	Dugalić (yellow card) 12'; Kanté 65'; Alves 69' (pen.)	Stadium: St. Jakob-Park; Attendance: 8,712; Referee: Stuart Attwell (England)

21 October 2021 3	Qarabağ (Azerbaijan)	2 – 1	(Kazakhstan) Kairat	Baku, Azerbaijan
22:45 (UTC+6)	Mahammadaliyev (yellow card) 18'; Wadji (yellow card) 27'; Sheydayev 79'; A.Huseynov 90+1'	Report	Kanté 19' (pen.); Alves (yellow card) 64'; Shushenachev (yellow card) 90+5'	Stadium: Republican Stadium; Attendance: 17,252; Referee: Yevhen Aranovskyi (Ukraine)
Note: Qarabağ play their home matches at the Republican Stadium, Baku, instead of their regular stadium Azersun Arena, Baku, which did not meet UEFA requirements.

4 November 2021 4	Kairat (Kazakhstan)	1 – 2	(Azerbaijan) Qarabağ	Almaty, Kazakhstan
21:30 (UTC+6)	Kanté (yellow card) 37' (goal) 68'; Góralski (yellow card) 45+1'; Kosović (yellow card) 60'	Report	Medina (yellow card) 5'; Wadji 58'; Zoubir 72'	Stadium: Central Stadium; Attendance: 2,638; Referee: Dumitri Muntean (Moldova)

25 November 2021 5	Kairat (Kazakhstan)	2 – 3	(Switzerland) Basel	Almaty, Kazakhstan
21:30 (UTC+6)	Vágner Love 23'; Góralski (yellow card) 44'; Hovhannisyan 56'; Alves (yellow card) 76'; Abiken (yellow card) 77'; Vorogovsky (yellow card) 89' (yellow-red card) 90+3'; Mikanović (yellow card) 90+6'	Report	Cabral 45' (pen.) (yellow card) 77'; Pelmard (yellow card) 54'; Stocker (yellow card) 61'; Kasami (yellow card) 62' (goal) 73'; Zhegrova 69'	Stadium: Central Stadium; Attendance: 4,159; Referee: Goga Kikacheishvili (Georgia)

10 December 2021 6	Omonia (Cyprus)	0 – 0	(Kazakhstan) Kairat	Nicosia, Cyprus
02:00 (UTC+6)		Report	Mikanović (yellow card) 15'; Góralski (yellow card) 23'; Dugalić (yellow card) 30'; Pokatilov (yellow card) 39'; João Paulo (penalty missed) 45+2'; Abiken (yellow card) 66'; Bagnack (yellow card) 72'; S.Keiler (yellow card) 90+4'	Stadium: GSP Stadium; Attendance: 3,239; Referee: Genc Nuza (Kosovo)

== Squad statistics ==
As of match played 10 December 2021

=== Appearances and goals ===
No.	Pos	Nat	Player	Total		Premier League		Kazakhstan Cup		Super Cup		UEFA Champions League		UEFA Europa League		UEFA Europa Conference League	
No.	Pos	Nat	Player	Apps	Goals	Apps	Goals	Apps	Goals	Apps	Goals	Apps	Goals	Apps	Goals	Apps	Goals
1	GK	(Kazakhstan) KAZ	Stas Pokatilov	46	0	25	0	7	0	1	0	3	0	2	0	8	0
3	DF	(Kazakhstan) KAZ	Sergey Keyler	14	0	2+2	0	3+3	0	1	0	0	0	0	0	1+2	0
4	DF	(Kazakhstan) KAZ	Nuraly Alip	45	1	24+1	0	6	0	1	0	4	1	2	0	7	0
5	DF	(Kazakhstan) KAZ	Gafurzhan Suyumbayev	17	1	11+3	1	0	0	0	0	3	0	0	0	0	0
6	MF	(Poland) POL	Jacek Góralski	11	0	1+2	0	4	0	0	0	0	0	0	0	3+1	0
7	MF	(Kyrgyzstan) KGZ	Gulzhigit Alykulov	46	6	17+6	4	6+3	1	0+2	1	0+4	0	1+1	0	0+6	0
8	MF	(Kazakhstan) KAZ	Aybol Abiken	40	5	16+5	2	6+2	1	1+1	0	3	1	2	1	2+2	0
9	FW	(Brazil) BRA	Vágner Love	42	17	18+4	7	3+3	5	1+1	0	4	1	2	0	6	4
11	MF	(Kazakhstan) KAZ	Yan Vorogovsky	21	0	5	0	5+1	0	0	0	1+1	0	2	0	5+1	0
13	DF	(Armenia) ARM	Kamo Hovhannisyan	44	5	23+2	4	6	0	1	0	4	0	2	0	5+1	1
15	DF	(Cameroon) CMR	Macky Bagnack	21	1	6	0	5	0	0	0	0+1	1	1	0	8	0
16	MF	(Portugal) POR	Ricardo Alves	22	3	6	0	6	1	0	0	0+1	0	0+2	0	7	2
18	FW	(Guinea) GUI	José Kanté	38	17	20+2	9	4+1	4	0	0	3	1	1	0	6+1	3
19	FW	(Kazakhstan) KAZ	Artur Shushenachev	43	23	12+7	12	6+2	6	2	1	4	0	1+1	1	3+5	3
20	DF	(Serbia) SRB	Rade Dugalić	42	5	21	1	6	4	1+1	0	4	0	2	0	7	0
22	MF	(Montenegro) MNE	Nebojša Kosović	36	5	23+1	4	1	0	1+1	1	3	0	0	0	5+1	0
23	MF	(Kazakhstan) KAZ	Andrey Ulshin	20	2	1+9	0	5+1	2	2	0	0+1	0	0+1	0	0	0
24	DF	(Croatia) CRO	Dino Mikanović	40	0	17+3	0	6+1	0	1	0	2+2	0	1	0	6+1	0
25	FW	(Brazil) BRA	João Paulo	14	1	2+3	1	4+1	0	0	0	0+1	0	0	0	3	0
28	FW	(Kazakhstan) KAZ	Yerkebulan Seydakhmet	16	0	0+7	0	4+3	0	0	0	0	0	0	0	0+2	0
29	MF	(Kazakhstan) KAZ	Daniyar Usenov	24	1	3+12	1	3+1	0	1+1	0	0+1	0	0+1	0	0+1	0
30	GK	(Kazakhstan) KAZ	Danil Ustimenko	6	0	1	0	3	0	1	0	1	0	0	0	0	0
33	DF	(Belarus) BLR	Dzyanis Palyakow	42	3	21+1	2	5+1	0	2	1	4	0	2	0	5+1	0
35	FW	(Kazakhstan) KAZ	Denis Mitrofanov	6	0	0+2	0	1+3	0	0	0	0	0	0	0	0	0
36	MF	(Kazakhstan) KAZ	Sagi Anet	5	0	0	0	2+3	0	0	0	0	0	0	0	0	0
46	MF	(Kazakhstan) KAZ	Arsen Buranchiev	21	1	1+4	1	3+4	0	1	0	1+3	0	1+1	0	1+1	0
47	FW	(Kazakhstan) KAZ	Alisher Rakhimzhanov	3	0	0	0	0+3	0	0	0	0	0	0	0	0	0
49	MF	(Kazakhstan) KAZ	Darkhan Medelkhan	1	0	0	0	0+1	0	0	0	0	0	0	0	0	0
57	DF	(Kazakhstan) KAZ	Ravil Ibragimov	3	0	0	0	2+1	0	0	0	0	0	0	0	0	0
64	MF	(Kazakhstan) KAZ	Vladislav Kravchenko	2	0	0	0	1+1	0	0	0	0	0	0	0	0	0
68	MF	(Kazakhstan) KAZ	Adilet Sadybekov	3	0	0	0	2+1	0	0	0	0	0	0	0	0	0
72	GK	(Kazakhstan) KAZ	Temirlan Anarbekov	2	0	0	0	1+1	0	0	0	0	0	0	0	0	0
74	FW	(Kazakhstan) KAZ	Galymzhan Kenzhebek	2	0	0	0	0+2	0	0	0	0	0	0	0	0	0
75	DF	(Kazakhstan) KAZ	Alexandr Shirobokov	6	0	0	0	3+1	0	1	0	0+1	0	0	0	0	0
81	DF	(Kazakhstan) KAZ	Alexander Mrynsky	2	0	0	0	2	0	0	0	0	0	0	0	0	0
84	MF	(Kazakhstan) KAZ	Nazar Al-Khadzh	1	0	0	0	0+1	0	0	0	0	0	0	0	0	0
85	MF	(Kazakhstan) KAZ	Miras Omatay	2	0	0	0	0+2	0	0	0	0	0	0	0	0	0
Players away from Kairat on loan:
10	FW	(Germany) GER	Streli Mamba	13	2	3+8	1	0	0	1+1	1	0	0	0	0	0	0
17	MF	(Kazakhstan) KAZ	Sultanbek Astanov	10	0	4+5	0	0	0	1	0	0	0	0	0	0	0
Players who left Kairat during the season:
11	FW	(Ukraine) UKR	Aderinsola Eseola	11	2	3+6	2	0	0	1+1	0	0	0	0	0	0	0

=== Goal scorers ===
Place	Position	Nation	Number	Name	Premier League	Kazakhstan Cup	Super Cup	UEFA Champions League	UEFA Europa League	UEFA Europa Conference League	Total
1	FW	(Kazakhstan)	19	Artur Shushenachev	12	6	1	0	1	3	23
2	FW	(Guinea)	18	José Kanté	9	4	0	1	0	3	17
2	FW	(Brazil)	9	Vágner Love	7	5	0	1	0	4	17
4	MF	(Kyrgyzstan)	7	Gulzhigit Alykulov	4	1	1	0	0	0	6
5	MF	(Montenegro)	22	Nebojša Kosović	4	0	1	0	0	0	5
5	DF	(Armenia)	13	Kamo Hovhannisyan	4	0	0	0	0	1	5
5	MF	(Kazakhstan)	8	Aybol Abiken	2	1	0	1	1	0	5
5	DF	(Serbia)	20	Rade Dugalić	1	4	0	0	0	0	5
9	DF	(Belarus)	33	Dzyanis Palyakow	2	0	1	0	0	0	3
9	MF	(Portugal)	16	Ricardo Alves	0	1	0	0	0	2	3
11	FW	(Ukraine)	11	Aderinsola Eseola	2	0	0	0	0	0	2
11	FW	(Germany)	10	Streli Mamba	1	0	1	0	0	0	2
11	MF	(Kazakhstan)	23	Andrey Ulshin	0	2	0	0	0	0	2
14	MF	(Kazakhstan)	29	Daniyar Usenov	1	0	0	0	0	0	1
14	DF	(Kazakhstan)	5	Gafurzhan Suyumbayev	1	0	0	0	0	0	1
14	MF	(Kazakhstan)	46	Arsen Buranchiev	1	0	0	0	0	0	1
14	FW	(Brazil)	25	João Paulo	1	0	0	0	0	0	1
14	DF	(Kazakhstan)	4	Nuraly Alip	0	0	0	1	0	0	1
14	DF	(Cameroon)	15	Macky Bagnack	0	0	0	1	0	0	1
14				Own goal	0	1	0	0	0	0	1
				TOTALS	52	25	5	5	2	13	102

=== Clean sheets ===
Place	Position	Nation	Number	Name	Premier League	Kazakhstan Cup	Super Cup	UEFA Champions League	UEFA Europa League	UEFA Europa Conference League	Total
1	GK	(Kazakhstan)	1	Stas Pokatilov	9	5	0	1	1	2	18
2	GK	(Kazakhstan)	30	Danil Ustimenko	1	1	0	0	0	0	2
				TOTALS	10	6	0	1	1	2	20

=== Disciplinary record ===
Number	Nation	Position	Name	Premier League		Kazakhstan Cup		Super Cup		UEFA Champions League		UEFA Europa League		UEFA Europa Conference League		Total	
Number	Nation	Position	Name	Booked	Sent off (straight red)	Booked	Sent off (straight red)	Booked	Sent off (straight red)	Booked	Sent off (straight red)	Booked	Sent off (straight red)	Booked	Sent off (straight red)	Booked	Sent off (straight red)
1	(Kazakhstan)	GK	Stas Pokatilov	1	0	0	0	0	0	0	0	0	0	1	0	2	0
3	(Kazakhstan)	DF	Sergey Keyler	1	0	2	0	1	0	0	1	0	0	1	0	5	1
4	(Kazakhstan)	DF	Nuraly Alip	4	0	0	0	2	1	1	0	2	0	0	0	9	1
5	(Kazakhstan)	DF	Gafurzhan Suyumbayev	1	0	0	0	0	0	1	0	0	0	0	0	2	0
6	(Poland)	MF	Jacek Góralski	0	0	0	0	0	0	0	0	0	0	3	0	3	0
7	(Kyrgyzstan)	MF	Gulzhigit Alykulov	2	0	1	0	0	0	1	0	1	0	0	0	5	0
8	(Kazakhstan)	MF	Aybol Abiken	7	2	1	0	1	0	1	0	1	1	3	0	14	3
9	(Brazil)	FW	Vágner Love	4	1	0	0	0	0	1	0	0	0	0	0	5	1
11	(Kazakhstan)	MF	Yan Vorogovsky	1	0	0	0	0	0	0	0	0	0	3	1	4	1
13	(Armenia)	DF	Kamo Hovhannisyan	2	1	1	0	0	0	2	0	0	0	0	0	5	1
15	(Cameroon)	DF	Macky Bagnack	2	0	0	0	0	0	1	0	0	0	2	0	5	0
16	(Portugal)	MF	Ricardo Alves	2	0	1	0	0	0	0	0	0	0	3	0	6	0
18	(Guinea)	FW	José Kanté	4	0	1	0	0	0	0	0	1	0	2	0	8	0
19	(Kazakhstan)	FW	Artur Shushenachev	0	0	1	0	0	0	1	0	0	0	1	0	3	0
20	(Serbia)	DF	Rade Dugalić	6	1	3	1	0	0	0	0	2	0	2	0	13	2
22	(Montenegro)	MF	Nebojša Kosović	4	0	0	0	0	0	0	0	0	0	1	0	5	0
23	(Kazakhstan)	MF	Andrey Ulshin	0	0	1	0	0	0	0	0	0	0	0	0	1	0
24	(Croatia)	DF	Dino Mikanović	2	0	1	0	1	0	1	0	0	0	3	0	8	0
25	(Brazil)	FW	João Paulo	2	0	0	0	0	0	0	0	0	0	0	0	2	0
28	(Kazakhstan)	FW	Yerkebulan Seydakhmet	2	0	2	0	0	0	0	0	0	0	0	0	4	0
29	(Kazakhstan)	MF	Daniyar Usenov	0	0	0	0	0	0	1	0	1	0	0	0	2	0
30	(Kazakhstan)	GK	Danil Ustimenko	0	0	0	1	1	0	0	0	0	0	0	0	1	1
33	(Belarus)	DF	Dzyanis Palyakow	3	1	0	0	0	0	0	0	0	1	0	0	3	2
46	(Kazakhstan)	MF	Arsen Buranchiev	0	0	4	0	0	0	1	0	1	0	1	0	7	0
85	(Kazakhstan)	MF	Miras Omatay	0	0	1	0	0	0	0	0	0	0	0	0	1	0
Players away on loan:
17	(Kazakhstan)	MF	Sultanbek Astanov	1	0	0	0	0	0	0	0	0	0	0	0	1	0
Players who left Kairat during the season:
			TOTALS	51	6	20	2	6	1	12	1	9	2	26	1	124	13
