= 2020 FC Kairat season =

FC Kairat
2020 season
- Chairman: Kairat Boranbayev
- Manager: Aleksey Shpilevsky
- Stadium: Central Stadium
- Premier League: 1st (champions)
- Kazakhstan Cup: Canceled due to the COVID-19 pandemic
- Europa League: Second qualifying round vs Maccabi Haifa
- Top goalscorer: League: Abat Aimbetov (10 goals); All: Abat Aimbetov; Vágner Love (10 each)
Home colours	Away colours	Third colours

The 2020 FC Kairat season is the 10th successive season that the club will play in the Kazakhstan Premier League, the highest tier of association football in Kazakhstan, since their promotion back to the top flight in 2009. Kairat will also play in the Kazakhstan Cup and the Europa League.

== Season events ==
On 11 January, Kairat announced the signing of Kamo Hovhannisyan to a two-year contract. On 19 January, Kairat announced the signing of Jacek Góralski to a three-year contract. On 27 January, Kairat announced the signing of Gulzhigit Alykulov on a two-year contract, with the option of a third, and the signing of Abat Aimbetov to a one-year contract, with the option of a second.

On 3 February, Danil Ustimenko extended his contract with Kairat until the end of the 2024 season, Adam Adakhadzhiev and Vyacheslav Shvyrev extended their contracts until the end of the 2023 season and Artur Shushenachev extended his contract until the end of the 2022 season.

On 13 March, the Football Federation of Kazakhstan announced all league fixtures would be played behind closed doors for the foreseeable future due to the COVID-19 pandemic. On 16 March the Football Federation of Kazakhstan suspended all football until 15 April.

On 26 March, Kairat announced the signing of Kirill Kolesnichenko to a three-year contract from Chertanovo Moscow.

After Ramazan Orazov left the club in March to join BFC Daugavpils, whilst still having a valid contract with Kairat, Kairat filled a grievance lawsuit with FIFA against the Latvian club, seeking compensation.

On 26 July, it was announced that the league would resume on 1 July, with no fans being permitted to watch the games. On 3 July, the Kazakhstan Premier League was suspended for two-weeks due to the COVID-19 pandemic.

On 8 July, Kairat announced the signing of Brazilian international Vágner Love on a six-month contract, with the option to extend it.

On 24 August, Kairat announced the signing of Dzyanis Palyakow to an 18-month contract after his release by Ural Yekaterinburg.

On 3 September, Kirill Kolesnichenko joined Rotor Volgograd.

On 5 November, Kairat extended their contract with Vágner Love until the end of the 2021 season, with Rade Dugalić extending his contract until the end of the 2022 season on 6 November, and Dino Mikanović also extending his contract for two year on 7 November.

On 20 November, Nebojša Kosović extended his contract with Kairat for an additional two-years, with the club confirming that Nuraly Alip is under contract with Kairat until the 2023 the following day.

On 2 December, Nurlan Dairov and Konrad Wrzesiński left the club after their contracts had expired.

== Squad ==
As of match played 30 November 2020

No.	Name	Nationality	Position	Date of birth (age)	Signed from	Signed in	Contract ends	Apps.	Goals
Goalkeepers
1	Stas Pokatilov	(Kazakhstan)	GK	8 December 1992 (aged 27)	Rostov	2017	2022	112	0
30	Danil Ustimenko	(Kazakhstan)	GK	8 August 2000 (aged 20)	Youth Team	2019	2024	8	0
31	Dinmukhammed Zhomart	(Kazakhstan)	GK	6 December 2000 (aged 19)	Youth Team	2019		1	0
72	Temirlan Anarbekov	(Kazakhstan)	GK	14 October 2003 (aged 17)	Youth Team	2020		1	0
Defenders
2	Sergey Keyler	(Kazakhstan)	DF	11 August 1994 (aged 26)	Okzhetpes	2018	2021	29	1
3	Dzyanis Palyakow	(Belarus)	DF	17 April 1991 (aged 29)	Ural Yekaterinburg	2020	2021	9	1
4	Nuraly Alip	(Kazakhstan)	DF	22 December 1999 (aged 20)	Academy	2018	2023	58	4
5	Gafurzhan Suyumbayev	(Kazakhstan)	DF	19 August 1990 (aged 30)	Ordabasy	2016		141	9
15	Nurlan Dairov	(Kazakhstan)	DF	26 June 1995 (aged 25)	Academy	2012		5	0
20	Rade Dugalić	(Serbia)	DF	5 November 1992 (aged 28)	Yenisey Krasnoyarsk	2019	2022	53	7
24	Dino Mikanović	(Croatia)	DF	7 May 1994 (aged 26)	AGF	2019	2022	57	1
37	Madi Aitore	(Kazakhstan)	DF	6 February 1998 (aged 22)	Academy	2019		2	0
75	Alexandr Shirobokov	(Kazakhstan)	DF	2 January 2003 (aged 17)	Academy	2020		2	0
Midfielders
6	Jacek Góralski	(Poland)	MF	21 September 1992 (aged 28)	Ludogorets Razgrad	2020	2022	18	0
8	Aybol Abiken	(Kazakhstan)	MF	1 June 1996 (aged 24)	Academy	2015	2022	74	8
13	Kamo Hovhannisyan	(Armenia)	MF	5 October 1992 (aged 28)	Zhetysu	2020	2021	15	1
14	Adam Adakhadzhiev	(Kazakhstan)	MF	23 November 1998 (aged 22)	Academy	2019	2023	10	0
18	Konrad Wrzesiński	(Poland)	MF	10 September 1993 (aged 27)	Zagłębie Sosnowiec	2019	2020	43	6
21	Yerkebulan Tungyshbayev	(Kazakhstan)	MF	14 January 1995 (aged 25)	Ordabasy	2019	2021	27	0
22	Nebojša Kosović	(Montenegro)	MF	24 February 1995 (aged 25)	Partizan	2019	2022	35	4
27	Gulzhigit Alykulov	(Kyrgyzstan)	MF	25 November 2000 (aged 20)	Neman Grodno	2020	2021(+1)	20	2
29	Daniyar Usenov	(Kazakhstan)	MF	18 February 2001 (aged 19)	Academy	2020		9	2
35	Aibarr Nurdaliyev	(Kazakhstan)	MF	12 August 1999 (aged 21)	Academy	2019		1	0
46	Arsen Buranchiev	(Kazakhstan)	MF	12 September 2001 (aged 19)	Academy	2020		2	0
57	Ravil Ibragimov	(Kazakhstan)	MF	25 December 2000 (aged 19)	Astana	2020		1	0
58	Andrey Ulshin	(Kazakhstan)	MF	18 April 2000 (aged 20)	Academy	2020		2	1
Forwards
7	Abat Aimbetov	(Kazakhstan)	FW	7 August 1995 (aged 25)	Aktobe	2020	2020 (+1)	22	10
9	Vágner Love	(Brazil)	FW	11 June 1984 (aged 36)	Corinthians	2020	2021	15	10
11	Aderinsola Eseola	(Ukraine)	FW	28 June 1991 (aged 29)	Zirka Kropyvnytskyi	2018	2021	73	36
17	Sultanbek Astanov	(Kazakhstan)	FW	23 March 1999 (aged 21)	Academy	2019		23	2
19	Artur Shushenachev	(Kazakhstan)	FW	7 April 1998 (aged 22)	Academy	2017	2022	22	4
23	Vyacheslav Shvyrev	(Kazakhstan)	FW	7 January 2001 (aged 19)	Academy	2018	2023	29	3
47	Damir Bitussupov	(Kazakhstan)	FW	21 March 2000 (aged 20)	Academy	2019		1	0
59	Aibar Abdulla	(Kazakhstan)	FW	22 January 2002 (aged 18)	Academy	2020		2	0
74	Galymzhan Kenzhebek	(Kazakhstan)	FW	12 February 2003 (aged 17)	Academy	2020		1	0
Players away on loan
10	Yerkebulan Seydakhmet	(Kazakhstan)	FW	4 February 2000 (aged 20)	Ufa	2019	2022	15	1
25	Kirill Kolesnichenko	(Russia)	MF	31 January 2000 (aged 20)	Chertanovo Moscow	2020	2022	0	0
Players that left during the season
26	Ramazan Orazov	(Kazakhstan)	MF	30 January 1998 (aged 22)	Academy	2017		31	1

=== Out on loan ===
Note: Flags indicate national team as defined under FIFA eligibility rules; some limited exceptions apply. Players may hold more than one non-FIFA nationality.

No. / Pos. / Nation / Player; 10 / FW / KAZ / Yerkebulan Seydakhmet (at (Kazakhstan) Zhetysu)	No. / Pos. / Nation / Player; 25 / MF / RUS / Kirill Kolesnichenko (at (Russia) Rotor Volgograd)

== Transfers ==
=== In ===
Date	Position	Nationality	Name	From	Fee	Ref.
11 January 2020	MF	(Armenia)	Kamo Hovhannisyan	Zhetysu	Undisclosed	
19 January 2020	MF	(Poland)	Jacek Góralski	Ludogorets Razgrad	Undisclosed	
27 January 2020	MF	(Kyrgyzstan)	Gulzhigit Alykulov	Neman Grodno	Undisclosed	
27 January 2020	FW	(Kazakhstan)	Abat Aimbetov	Aktobe	Undisclosed	
26 March 2020	MF	(Russia)	Kirill Kolesnichenko	Chertanovo Moscow	Undisclosed	
8 July 2020	FW	(Brazil)	Vágner Love	Corinthians	Free	
24 August 2020	DF	(Belarus)	Dzyanis Palyakow	Ural Yekaterinburg	Free	

=== Out ===
Date	Position	Nationality	Name	To	Fee	Ref.
6 February 2020	FW	(Kazakhstan)	Samat Sarsenov	Valmiera Glass ViA	Undisclosed	
11 February 2020	GK	(Kazakhstan)	Vladimir Plotnikov	Ordabasy	Undisclosed	
27 February 2020	FW	(Kazakhstan)	Rifat Nurmugamet	Aktobe	Undisclosed	
6 March 2020	DF	(Kazakhstan)	Aleksandr Sokolenko	Kyzylzhar	Undisclosed	

=== Loans out ===
Date from	Position	Nationality	Name	To	Date to	Ref.
6 August 2020	FW	(Kazakhstan)	Yerkebulan Seydakhmet	Zhetysu	End of season	
3 September 2020	MF	(Russia)	Kirill Kolesnichenko	Rotor Volgograd	30 June 2021	

=== Released ===
Date	Position	Nationality	Name	Joined	Date	Ref.
6 January 2020	MF	(South Korea)	Han Jeong-uh	Suwon	9 January 2020	
11 March 2020	MF	(Kazakhstan)	Ramazan Orazov	Daugavpils	11 March 2020	
2 December 2020	DF	(Kazakhstan)	Nurlan Dairov	Turan	20 January 2021	
2 December 2020	MF	(Poland)	Konrad Wrzesiński	Jagiellonia Białystok	16 March 2021	
31 December 2020	MF	(Kazakhstan)	Aibarr Nurdaliyev			
31 December 2020	FW	(Kazakhstan)	Abat Aimbetov	Krylia Sovetov	21 February 2021	

== Friendlies ==
26 January 2020	Kairat (Kazakhstan)	1 – 1	(Poland) Legia Warsaw	Belek, Turkey
14:00 (UTC+6)	Dugalić (yellow card) 13'; Seydakhmet (yellow card) 18'; Shushenachev 42' (red card) 70'	Report	Wieteska (penalty missed) 13' (yellow card) 71'; Stolarski (yellow card) 19'; K.Kostorz (yellow card) 47'; Rémy (red card) 70'; Gvilia (penalty missed) 75'

26 January 2020	Kairat (Kazakhstan)	2 – 0	(Poland) Legia Warsaw	Belek, Turkey
20:30 (UTC+6)		Report	Antolić 29' (pen.); Martins 82' (pen.)

28 January 2020	Kairat (Kazakhstan)	0 – 2	(Ukraine) Dynamo Kyiv	Belek, Turkey
12:00 (UTC+6)	Abiken (yellow card) 33'; Seydakhmet (yellow card) 43'	Report	Kargbo Jr. 52', 74'; Kadiri (yellow card) 77'

29 January 2020	Kairat (Kazakhstan)	0 – 6	(Bulgaria) Ludogorets Razgrad	Belek, Turkey
20:00 (UTC+6)		Report	Keșerü 2'; Jorginho 38'; Świerczok 66', 76'; Tchibota 68' (pen.); Bakalov 70'

13 February 2020	Kairat (Kazakhstan)	1 – 1	(Russia) Dynamo Moscow	Belek, Turkey
20:00 (UTC+6)	D.Usanov 57'	Report	Igboun 72'; Šunjić (red card) 80'

15 February 2020	Kairat (Kazakhstan)	4 – 2	(Ukraine) Dnipro-1	Belek, Turkey
17:00 (UTC+6)	Kosović 20'; Wrzesiński 37'; Dugalić 45+2'; Tungyshbayev 82'	Report	Supriaha 62'; Buletsa 83'}

17 February 2020	Kairat (Kazakhstan)	1 – 3	(Russia) Zenit St.Petersburg	Belek, Turkey
17:00 (UTC+6)	Tungyshbayev 34'	Report	Ozdoyev (red card) 8'; Malcom 25'; Douglas 67'; Azmoun 68'

19 February 2020	Kairat (Kazakhstan)	3 – 2	(Russia) Rubin Kazan	Belek, Turkey
18:00 (UTC+6)	Aimbetov 14'; Dugalić 16'; Wrzesiński 36'	Report	Davitashvili 77' (pen.); Abildgaard 90'

11 June 2020	Kairat	2 – 2	Taraz	Almaty
(UTC+6)	Usenov 2'; S.Astanov 45'	Report	Brkić 69'; A.Taubay 78'	Stadium: T.S. Segizbaeva; Attendance: 0
Note: Match played behind closed doors.

13 June 2020	Kairat	1 – 0	Taraz	Almaty
(UTC+6)	Abiken 79'	Report		Stadium: T.S. Segizbaeva; Attendance: 0
Note: Match played behind closed doors.

19 June 2020	Kairat	3 – 1	Okzhetpes	Almaty
(UTC+6)	Aimbetov 47', 63'; Kosović 78'	Report	Zorić 73'	Stadium: T.S. Segizbaeva; Attendance: 0
Note: Match played behind closed doors.

== Competitions ==
=== Premier League ===
==== Results summary ====
Overall								Home						Away					
Pld	W	D	L	GF	GA	GD	Pts	W	D	L	GF	GA	GD	W	D	L	GF	GA	GD
20	14	3	3	47	19	+28	45	8	1	1	26	9	+17	6	2	2	21	10	+11

Last updated: 30 November 2020.
Source: See Results

==== Results by round ====
Round	1	2	3	4	5	6	7	8	9	10	11	12	13	14	15	16	17	18	19	20	21	22
Ground	H	H	A	H	A	H	A	H	A	-	A	H	H	A	H	A	A	H	A	-	H	A
Result	W	W	L	W	W	W	W	W	W	-	D	D	W	W	W	W	W	W	D	-	L	L
Position	4	2	1	1	1	1	1	1	1	-	1	1	1	1	1	1	1	1	1	-	1	1

Source: See Results
A = Away; H = Home; W = Win; D = Draw; L = Loss

==== Results ====
7 March 2020 1	Kairat	2 – 1	Taraz	Almaty
15:00 (UTC+6)	Góralski (yellow card) 19'; Wrzesiński 24'; Aimbetov 83'	Report	Zatl 29'	Stadium: Central Stadium; Attendance: 2,400; Referee: Denis Tevyashov

11 March 2020 21	Kairat	5 – 0	Okzhetpes	Almaty
16:00 (UTC+6)	Alip 17' (pen.); Aimbetov 25', 51'; Shushenachev (penalty missed) 57' 57'; Abiken 66'	Report	Gian (yellow card) 5'; Stojanović (yellow card) 9'; Dimov (yellow card) 16'; Mischenko (red card) 45+1'	Stadium: Central Stadium; Attendance: 1,400; Referee: Zhandos Abzhan
Note: Match was originally scheduled for 2 August 2020.

15 March 2020 2	Shakhter Karagandy	1 – 0	Kairat	Karaganda
17:00 (UTC+6)	Turysbek 17'; T.Zakirov (yellow card) 51'; Usman (yellow card) 79'	Report	Alip (yellow card) 84'	Stadium: Shakhter Stadium; Attendance: 0 Referee: Daniyar Sakhi
Note: Match played behind closed doors due to the COVID-19 pandemic.

1 July 2020 3	Kairat	3 – 0	Zhetysu	Almaty
18:00 (UTC+6)	Hovhannisyan 11'; Mikanović (yellow card) 16'; Góralski (yellow card) 42'; Wrzesiński 56'; Shushenachev 90+1'	Report	M.Sapanov (yellow card) 66'	Stadium: Central Stadium; Attendance: 0 Referee: Anatolyi Vishnichenko
Note: Match originally scheduled for 20 March, but postponed on 16 March due to the COVID-19 pandemic. Match played behind closed doors due to the COVID-19 pandemic.

18 August 2020 4	Caspiy	0 – 3	Kairat	Talgar
17:00 (UTC+6)	A.Nabikhanov (yellow card) 52'; Shakhmetov (yellow card) 57'; Adams (yellow card) 87'	Report	Alip 8', 52'; Mikanović (yellow card) 75'; Shushenachev 80'	Stadium: UTB Talgar; Attendance: 0 Referee: Denis Tevyashov
Note: Match originally scheduled for 3 April and then 4 July, but postponed twice due to the COVID-19 pandemic. Match played at the UTB Talgar stadium in Talgar, instead of Caspiy's regular Zhastar Stadium in Aktau. Match played behind closed doors due to the COVID-19 pandemic.

21 August 2020 5	Kairat	3 – 1	Tobol	Almaty
19:00 (UTC+6)	Kosović 6', 48'; Dugalić 16'; Alip (yellow card) 41'; Mikanović (yellow card) 79'	Report	Avetisyan 66'	Stadium: Central Stadium; Attendance: 0 Referee: Askhat Abdanbayev
Note: Match originally scheduled for 11 April and then 10 July, but postponed twice due to the COVID-19 pandemic. Match played behind closed doors due to the COVID-19 pandemic.

30 August 2020 7	Ordabasy	1 – 3	Kairat	Talgar
16:00 (UTC+6)	João Paulo 34'; Simčević (yellow card) 38'	Report	Vágner Love 17', 22'; Aimbetov 40'; Alip (yellow card) 45'; Kosović (yellow card) 72'; Góralski (yellow card) 74'; Suyumbayev (yellow card) 86'; Pokatilov (yellow card) 87'	Stadium: UTB Talgar; Attendance: 0 Referee: Timur Kumashev
Note: Match played at the UTB Talgar stadium in Talgar, instead of Ordabasy's regular Kazhymukan Munaitpasov Stadium in Shymkent. Match played behind closed doors due to the COVID-19 pandemic.

12 September 2020 8	Kairat	2 – 1	Kaisar	Almaty
20:00 (UTC+6)	S.Keyler (yellow card) 8'; Góralski (yellow card) 26'; Alykulov (yellow card) 37'; Abiken 72'; Eseola 90+2' (yellow card) 90+2'	Report	Narzildaev (yellow card) 4'; Kolev (yellow card) 38'; Lobjanidze 44'; Stanisavljević (yellow card) 71'	Stadium: Central Stadium; Attendance: 0 Referee: Igor Chesnokov
Note: Match played behind closed doors due to the COVID-19 pandemic.

21 September 2020 9	Kyzylzhar	0 – 1	Kairat	Talgar
16:00 (UTC+6)	Markelov (yellow card) 18'; Plătică (yellow card) 29'; B.Shaikhov (yellow card) 68'; Gubanov (yellow card) 74'	Report	Aimbetov 28'; Alip (yellow card) 90+3'; Kosović (yellow card) 90+4'	Stadium: UTB Talgar; Attendance: 0 Referee: Denis Izmailov
Note: Match played at the UTB Talgar stadium in Talgar, instead of Kyzylzhar's regular Karasai Stadium in Petropavl. Match played behind closed doors due to the COVID-19 pandemic.

27 September 2020 11	Okzhetpes	3 – 3	Kairat	Talgar
16:00 (UTC+6)	Dimov 6' (yellow card) 85'; S.Zhumakhanov (yellow card) 27'; D.Shmidt (yellow card) 45'; Dmitrijev 45+2', 57'; Abubakar (yellow card) 90+1'	Report	Góralski (yellow card) 20'; Kosović 28'; Aimbetov 38'; Abiken (yellow card) 58'; Vágner Love 73'	Stadium: UTB Talgar; Attendance: 0 Referee: Aleksandr Gauzer
Note: Match played at the UTB Talgar stadium in Talgar, instead of Okzhetpes's regular Okzhetpes Stadium in Kokshetau. Match played behind closed doors due to the COVID-19 pandemic.

1 October 2020 12	Kairat	1 – 1	Shakhter Karagandy	Almaty
19:00 (UTC+6)	Vágner Love 64'; Dugalić (yellow card) 68'	Report	Baah (yellow card) 16'; Tkachuk (yellow card) 56'; A.Tattybaev 82'	Stadium: Central Stadium; Attendance: 0 Referee: Zhandos Abzhan
Note: Match played behind closed doors due to the COVID-19 pandemic.

4 October 2020 6	Kairat	3 – 0	Astana	Almaty
20:30 (UTC+6)	Alykulov 24' (yellow card) 55'; Abiken 47' (yellow card) 52'; Radaković 49' (o.g.)	Report	Barseghyan (yellow card) 29'; Beisebekov (yellow card) 70'; Sigurjónsson (yellow card) 78'; Postnikov (yellow card) 85'; Shomko (yellow card) 88'	Stadium: Central Stadium; Attendance: 0 Referee: Artyom Kuchin
Note: Match played behind closed doors due to the COVID-19 pandemic.

18 October 2020 13	Zhetysu	2 – 4	Kairat	Almaty
17:00 (UTC+6)	Eugénio 6'; Suyumbayev 17' (o.g.); M.Sapanov (yellow card) 28' (yellow-red card) 59'; Mawutor (yellow card) 49'; Darabayev (yellow card) 89' (yellow-red card) 90+3'	Report	Aimbetov 30', 56'; Palyakow 75'; Góralski (yellow card) 80'; Usenov 90+4'	Stadium: Jas Qyran Stadium; Attendance: 0 Referee: Bolat Saryev
Note: Match played at the Jas Qyran Stadium in Almaty, instead of Zhetysu's regular Zhetysu Stadium in Taldıqorğan. Match played behind closed doors due to the COVID-19 pandemic.

22 October 2020 14	Kairat	3 – 1	Caspiy	Almaty
19:00 (UTC+6)	Palyakow (yellow card) 23'; Eseola 32'; Adams 40' (o.g.); Vágner Love 80'	Report	Shakhmetov 14' (yellow card) 18'; Bukorac (yellow card) 35'; R.Aslan (yellow card) 58'; Adams (yellow card) 71'	Stadium: Central Stadium; Attendance: 0 Referee: Daniyar Sakhi
Note: Match played behind closed doors due to the COVID-19 pandemic.

26 October 2020 15	Tobol	0 – 4	Kairat	Talgar
14:00 (UTC+6)	Fonseca (yellow card) 7'; Manzorro (yellow card) 16'; Yerlanov (yellow card) 76'	Report	Aimbetov 8'; Suyumbayev 28'; Kosović (yellow card) 39' (goal) 44'; Vágner Love 67'; Eseola (yellow card) 90'	Stadium: UTB Talgar; Attendance: 0 Referee: Bakhyt Kyzlbaev
Note: Match played at the UTB Talgar stadium in Talgar, instead of Tobol's regular Central Stadium in Kostanay. Match played behind closed doors due to the COVID-19 pandemic.

30 October 2020 16	Astana	0 – 1	Kairat	Almaty
17:00 (UTC+6)	Ebong (yellow card) 4'; Barseghyan (yellow card) 6'; Tomasov (yellow card) 38'	Report	Aimbetov 31'; Eseola (yellow card) 84'	Stadium: Jas Qyran Stadium; Attendance: 0 Referee: Igor Chesnokov
Note: Match played at the Jas Qyran Stadium in Almaty, instead of Astana's regular Astana Arena in Nur-Sultan. Match played behind closed doors due to the COVID-19 pandemic.

3 November 2020 17	Kiarat	3 – 1	Ordabasy	Almaty
15:00 (UTC+6)	Vágner Love 36' (yellow card) 78'; Alip 39' (pen.); Góralski (yellow card) 75'; U.Zhaksybaev 80' (o.g.); Tungyshbayev (yellow card) 87'; Pokatilov (yellow card) 88'	Report	Badibanga (yellow card) 31'; Mehanović (yellow card) 65'; U.Zhaksybaev (yellow card) 68'; João Paulo 77'; Diakate (yellow card) 84'	Stadium: Central Stadium; Attendance: 0 Referee: Denis Tevyashov
Note: Match played behind closed doors due to the COVID-19 pandemic.

7 November 2020 18	Kaisar	2 – 2	Kairat	Almaty
15:00 (UTC+6)	Narzildaev (yellow card) 42'; Graf (yellow card) 44' (goal) 89'; Lobjanidze 70'; I.Amirseitov (yellow card) 82'	Report	Wrzesiński (yellow card) 37' (goal) 64'; S.Keyler 45'; Alip (yellow card) 71'; Eseola (yellow card) 88'; N.Dairov (yellow card) 90+5'	Stadium: Jas Qyran Stadium; Attendance: 0 Referee: Zhandos Abzhan
Note: Match played at the Jas Qyran Stadium in Almaty, instead of Kaisar's regular Gani Muratbayev Stadium in Kyzylorda. Match played behind closed doors due to the COVID-19 pandemic.

21 November 2020 19	Kairat	2 – 3	Kyzylzhar	Almaty
15:00 (UTC+6)	N.Dairov (yellow card) 2' (red card) 21'; R.Ibragimov (yellow card) 13'; Usenov 15'; A.Ulshin 33'; A.Adakhadzhiev (yellow card) 58'; Aimbetov (yellow card) 60'; Mikanović (yellow card) 66'; Hovhannisyan (red card) 90'	Report	Drachenko 22' (pen.); Grigalashvili 26'; Delić (yellow card) 32'; Gubanov (yellow card) 81'; T.Muldinov 90+2'	Stadium: Central Stadium; Attendance: 0 Referee: Georgiy Chek
Note: Match played behind closed doors due to the COVID-19 pandemic.

30 November 2020 22	Taraz	1 – 0	Kairat	Almaty
18:00 (UTC+6)	Batsuyev 62'; Brkić (yellow card) 69'; Silva (yellow card) 69'	Report	A.Adakhadzhiev (yellow card) 15'; S.Astanov (yellow card) 30'; Abiken (yellow card) 90'	Stadium: Jas Qyran Stadium; Attendance: 0 Referee: Denis Izmailov
Note: Match played at the Jas Qyran Stadium in Almaty, instead of Taraz's regular Central Stadium in Taraz. Match played behind closed doors due to the COVID-19 pandemic.

==== League table ====
Pos	Team	Pld	W	D	L	GF	GA	GD	Pts	Qualification or relegation
1	Kairat (C)	20	14	3	3	48	19	+29	45	Qualification for the Champions League first qualifying round
2	Tobol	20	12	2	6	26	16	+10	38	Qualification for the Europa Conference League second qualifying round
3	Astana	20	11	3	6	32	21	+11	36	Qualification for the Europa Conference League second qualifying round
4	Shakhter Karagandy	20	9	5	6	29	22	+7	32	Qualification for the Europa Conference League second qualifying round
5	Ordabasy	20	9	4	7	27	26	+1	31	

Source: UEFA, Soccerway
Rules for classification: 1) Points; 2) Goal difference; 3) Matches won; 4) Goals scored; 5) Away goals scored; 6) Head-to-head points; 7) Head-to-head matches won; 8) Head-to-head goal difference; 9) Head-to-head goals scored; 10) Head-to-head away goals scored; 11) Draw.
(C) Champions

=== Kazakhstan Cup ===
July 2020 Last 16	–
(UTC+6)

=== UEFA Europa League ===
==== Qualifying rounds ====
27 August 2020 First qualifying round	Kairat (Kazakhstan)	4 – 1	(Armenia) Noah	Almaty, Kazakhstan
20:00 (UTC+6)	Alykulov 12' (yellow card) 72'; Vágner Love 35', 70'; Dugalić (yellow card) 74'; Eseola 90+4'	Report	K.Bor 8' (yellow card) 90+2'; Dedechko (yellow card) 22'	Stadium: Central Stadium; Attendance: 0 Referee: Kristoffer Karlsson (Sweden)
Note: Match played behind closed doors due to the COVID-19 pandemic in Europe.

17 September 2020 Second qualifying round	Maccabi Haifa (Israel)	2 – 1	(Kazakhstan) Kairat	Haifa, Israel
23:00 (UTC+6)	Ashkenazi 30'; Menahem (yellow card) 42'; Rukavytsya 71'; Mabouka (yellow card) 78'; Abu Fani (yellow card) 81'; Cohen (yellow card) 90+2'	Report	Alykulov (yellow card) 2'; Góralski (yellow card) 37'; Vágner Love 45+1'	Stadium: Sammy Ofer Stadium; Attendance: 0 Referee: Mads-Kristoffer Kristoffersen (Denmark)
Note: Match played behind closed doors due to the COVID-19 pandemic in Europe.

== Squad statistics ==
As of match played 30 November 2020

=== Appearances and goals ===
No.	Pos	Nat	Player	Total		Premier League		Kazakhstan Cup		UEFA Europa League	
No.	Pos	Nat	Player	Apps	Goals	Apps	Goals	Apps	Goals	Apps	Goals
1	GK	(Kazakhstan) KAZ	Stas Pokatilov	15	0	12+1	0	0	0	2	0
2	DF	(Kazakhstan) KAZ	Sergey Keyler	6	1	4+2	1	0	0	0	0
3	DF	(Belarus) BLR	Dzyanis Palyakow	9	1	7+2	1	0	0	0	0
4	DF	(Kazakhstan) KAZ	Nuraly Alip	16	4	13+1	4	0	0	2	0
5	DF	(Kazakhstan) KAZ	Gafurzhan Suyumbayev	17	1	15+1	1	0	0	1	0
6	MF	(Poland) POL	Jacek Góralski	18	0	16	0	0	0	2	0
7	FW	(Kazakhstan) KAZ	Abat Aimbetov	22	10	19+1	10	0	0	2	0
8	MF	(Kazakhstan) KAZ	Aybol Abiken	18	3	12+4	3	0	0	1+1	0
9	FW	(Brazil) BRA	Vágner Love	16	10	12+2	7	0	0	2	3
11	FW	(Ukraine) UKR	Aderinsola Eseola	19	3	3+14	2	0	0	0+2	1
13	MF	(Armenia) ARM	Kamo Hovhannisyan	15	1	5+9	1	0	0	1	0
14	MF	(Kazakhstan) KAZ	Adam Adakhadzhiev	7	0	3+4	0	0	0	0	0
15	DF	(Kazakhstan) KAZ	Nurlan Dairov	2	0	1+1	0	0	0	0	0
17	FW	(Kazakhstan) KAZ	Sultanbek Astanov	11	0	2+9	0	0	0	0	0
18	MF	(Poland) POL	Konrad Wrzesiński	13	3	9+2	3	0	0	1+1	0
19	FW	(Kazakhstan) KAZ	Artur Shushenachev	14	3	4+10	3	0	0	0	0
20	DF	(Serbia) SRB	Rade Dugalić	18	1	16	1	0	0	2	0
21	MF	(Kazakhstan) KAZ	Yerkebulan Tungyshbayev	11	0	3+7	0	0	0	0+1	0
22	MF	(Montenegro) MNE	Nebojša Kosović	18	4	16	4	0	0	2	0
24	DF	(Croatia) CRO	Dino Mikanović	21	0	19	0	0	0	2	0
27	MF	(Kyrgyzstan) KGZ	Gulzhigit Alykulov	20	2	14+4	1	0	0	2	1
29	MF	(Kazakhstan) KAZ	Daniyar Usenov	9	2	4+4	2	0	0	0+1	0
30	GK	(Kazakhstan) KAZ	Danil Ustimenko	8	0	7+1	0	0	0	0	0
31	GK	(Kazakhstan) KAZ	Dinmukhammed Zhomart	1	0	1	0	0	0	0	0
46	MF	(Kazakhstan) KAZ	Arsen Buranchiev	2	0	0+2	0	0	0	0	0
57	MF	(Kazakhstan) KAZ	Ravil Ibragimov	1	0	1	0	0	0	0	0
58	MF	(Kazakhstan) KAZ	Andrey Ulshin	2	1	1+1	1	0	0	0	0
59	FW	(Kazakhstan) KAZ	Aibar Abdulla	2	0	0+2	0	0	0	0	0
72	GK	(Kazakhstan) KAZ	Temirlan Anarbekov	1	0	0+1	0	0	0	0	0
74	FW	(Kazakhstan) KAZ	Galymzhan Kenzhebek	1	0	1	0	0	0	0	0
75	DF	(Kazakhstan) KAZ	Alexandr Shirobokov	2	0	1+1	0	0	0	0	0
Players away from Kairat on loan:
Players who left Kairat during the season:

=== Goal scorers ===
Place	Position	Nation	Number	Name	Premier League	Kazakhstan Cup	UEFA Europa League	Total
1	FW	(Kazakhstan)	7	Abat Aimbetov	10	0	0	10
1	FW	(Brazil)	9	Vágner Love	7	0	3	10
3	MF	(Montenegro)	22	Nebojša Kosović	4	0	0	4
3	DF	(Kazakhstan)	4	Nuraly Alip	4	0	0	4
5	FW	(Kazakhstan)	19	Artur Shushenachev	3	0	0	3
5	MF	(Kazakhstan)	8	Aybol Abiken	3	0	0	3
5	MF	(Poland)	18	Konrad Wrzesiński	3	0	0	3
5	FW	(Ukraine)	11	Aderinsola Eseola	2	0	1	3
9	MF	(Kazakhstan)	29	Daniyar Usenov	2	0	0	2
9	MF	(Kyrgyzstan)	27	Gulzhigit Alykulov	1	0	1	2
9				Own goal	2	0	0	2
12	MF	(Armenia)	13	Kamo Hovhannisyan	1	0	0	1
12	DF	(Serbia)	20	Rade Dugalić	1	0	0	1
12	DF	(Belarus)	3	Dzyanis Palyakow	1	0	0	1
12	DF	(Kazakhstan)	5	Gafurzhan Suyumbayev	1	0	0	1
12	DF	(Kazakhstan)	2	Sergey Keyler	1	0	0	1
12	MF	(Kazakhstan)	58	Andrey Ulshin	1	0	0	1
				TOTALS	47	0	5	52

=== Clean sheet ===
Place	Position	Nation	Number	Name	Premier League	Kazakhstan Cup	UEFA Europa League	Total
1	GK	(Kazakhstan)	1	Stas Pokatilov	5	0	0	5
2	GK	(Kazakhstan)	30	Danil Ustimenko	2	0	0	2
				TOTALS	7	0	0	7

=== Disciplinary record ===
Number	Nation	Position	Name	Premier League		Kazakhstan Cup		UEFA Europa League		Total	
Number	Nation	Position	Name	Yellow card	Red card	Yellow card	Red card	Yellow card	Red card	Yellow card	Red card
1	(Kazakhstan)	GK	Stas Pokatilov	2	0	0	0	0	0	2	0
2	(Kazakhstan)	DF	Sergey Keyler	1	0	0	0	0	0	1	0
3	(Belarus)	DF	Dzyanis Palyakow	1	0	0	0	0	0	1	0
4	(Kazakhstan)	DF	Nuraly Alip	5	0	0	0	0	0	5	0
5	(Kazakhstan)	DF	Gafurzhan Suyumbayev	1	0	0	0	0	0	1	0
6	(Poland)	MF	Jacek Góralski	7	0	0	0	1	0	8	0
7	(Kazakhstan)	FW	Abat Aimbetov	1	0	0	0	0	0	1	0
8	(Kazakhstan)	MF	Aybol Abiken	3	0	0	0	0	0	3	0
9	(Brazil)	FW	Vágner Love	1	0	0	0	0	0	1	0
11	(Ukraine)	FW	Aderinsola Eseola	4	0	0	0	0	0	4	0
13	(Armenia)	MF	Kamo Hovhannisyan	0	1	0	0	0	0	0	1
14	(Kazakhstan)	MF	Adam Adakhadzhiev	2	0	0	0	0	0	2	0
15	(Kazakhstan)	DF	Nurlan Dairov	2	1	0	0	0	0	2	1
17	(Kazakhstan)	FW	Sultanbek Astanov	1	0	0	0	0	0	1	0
18	(Poland)	MF	Konrad Wrzesiński	1	0	0	0	0	0	1	0
20	(Serbia)	DF	Rade Dugalić	1	0	0	0	1	0	2	0
21	(Kazakhstan)	MF	Yerkebulan Tungyshbayev	1	0	0	0	0	0	1	0
22	(Montenegro)	MF	Nebojša Kosović	3	0	0	0	0	0	3	0
24	(Croatia)	DF	Dino Mikanović	4	0	0	0	0	0	4	0
27	(Kyrgyzstan)	MF	Gulzhigit Alykulov	2	0	0	0	2	0	4	0
57	(Kazakhstan)	MF	Ravil Ibragimov	1	0	0	0	0	0	1	0
Players away on loan:
Players who left Kairat during the season:
			TOTALS	44	2	0	0	4	0	48	2
