= Gulzhigit Alykulov =

Kyrgyzstani footballer

Personal information
- Full name: Gulzhigit Zhanybekovich Alykulov
- Date of birth: 25 November 2000 (age 25)
- Place of birth: Toktogul, Jalal-Abad Region, Kyrgyzstan
- Height: 1.70 m (5 ft 7 in)
- Position: Midfielder

Team information
- Current team: Dinamo Minsk
- Number: 11

Youth career
- 2011–2016: Dordoi Bishkek
- 2017: Antalyaspor

Senior career*
Years	Team	Apps	(Gls)
2018	Kara-Balta	18	(7)
2018	Alga Bishkek	10	(1)
2019	Neman Grodno	23	(4)
2020–2023	Kairat	65	(8)
2023–2025	Neman Grodno	41	(10)
2025	Torpedo Moscow	19	(1)
2026–	Dinamo Minsk	14	(3)

International career^{‡}
2019–	Kyrgyzstan	47	(6)
- * Club domestic league appearances and goals as of 4 July 2026 ‡ National team caps and goals as of 5 September 2025

Gulzhigit Zhanybekovich Alykulov (Kyrgyz: Гүлжигит Алыкулов; Russian: Гулжигит Жаныбекович Алыкулов; born 25 November 2000) is a Kyrgyzstani professional footballer who plays for Dinamo Minsk and for the Kyrgyzstan national football team.

== Career ==
Alykulov is a graduate of the football academy of Dordoi. Between 2017 and 2018, he played in the system of the Turkish club Antalyaspor.

=== Club ===
He made his senior football debut in 2018 with FC Kara-Balta, a club in the Kyrgyz Premier League. In the second half of the season, he joined FC Alga.

Since 2019, he has been playing for the Belarusian club Neman Grodno. He debuted in the team's main squad on March 29. On April 19, he scored his first goal against Gomel, securing a victory for his team.

On 27 January 2020, FC Kairat announced the signing of Alykulov on a two-year contract, with the option of a third. On 11 May 2023, Alykulov bought out the remainder of his contract with Kairat and left the club.

On 4 August 2023, Alykulov re-signed for Neman Grodno.

=== National team ===
He played for Kyrgyzstan's youth national teams. In 2016, as part of the U-17 national team, he participated in the final tournament of the 2016 AFC U-16 Championship. On 22 September 2016, he scored a goal against Vietnam.

He made his debut for the senior team on June 11, 2019, in a match against Palestine.

== Career statistics ==
=== Club ===
As of match played 24 May 2025

Appearances and goals by club, season and competition
Club	Season	League			National Cup		Continental		Other		Total	
Club	Season	Division	Apps	Goals	Apps	Goals	Apps	Goals	Apps	Goals	Apps	Goals
Kara-Balta	2018	Top League	18	7			-				18	7
Alga Bishkek	2018	Top League	10	1			-				10	1
Neman Grodno	2019	Belarusian Premier League	23	4	1	0	-				24	4
Kairat	2020	Kazakhstan Premier League	18	1	0	0	2 (Note: Appearances in UEFA Europa League)	1	-		20	2
Kairat	2021	Kazakhstan Premier League	23	4	9	1	12 (Note: Four appearances in UEFA Champions League, two appearances in UEFA Europa League, six appearances in UEFA Conference League)	0	2 (Note: Appearances in Kazakhstan Super Cup)	1	46	6
Kairat	2022	Kazakhstan Premier League	18	2	5	2	2 (Note: Appearances in UEFA Conference League)	0	1	0	26	4
Kairat	2023	Kazakhstan Premier League	6	1	2	0	0	0	0	0	8	1
Kairat	Total		65	8	16	3	16	1	3	1	100	13
Neman Grodno	2023	Belarusian Premier League	14	2	1	0	1	0	0	0	16	2
Neman Grodno	2024	Belarusian Premier League	27	8	5	2	2	0	0	0	34	10
Neman Grodno	Total		41	10	6	2	3	0	0	0	50	12
Torpedo Moscow	2024–25	Russian First League	11	0	0	0	–		–		11	0
Career total			168	30	23	5	19	1	3	1	213	37

=== International ===
As of match played 5 June 2025

Kyrgyzstan
Year	Apps	Goals
2019	6	2
2020	0	0
2021	6	1
2022	5	0
2023	10	1
2024	13	1
2025	3	1
Total	43	6

=== International goals ===
Scores and results list Kyrgyzstan's goal tally first.

No.	Date	Venue	Opponent	Score	Result	Competition
1.	10 October 2019	Dolen Omurzakov Stadium, Bishkek, Kyrgyzstan	Myanmar	4–0	7–0	2022 FIFA World Cup qualification
2.	15 October 2019	MFF Football Centre, Ulaanbaatar, Mongolia	Mongolia	1–0	2–1	2022 FIFA World Cup qualification
3.	11 June 2021	Yanmar Stadium Nagai, Osaka, Japan	Myanmar	2–0	8–1	2022 FIFA World Cup qualification
4.	11 September 2023	Dolen Omurzakov Stadium, Bishkek, Kyrgyzstan	Kuwait	1–1	3–1	Friendly
5.	6 June 2024	Dolen Omurzakov Stadium, Bishkek, Kyrgyzstan	Malaysia	1–0	1–1	2026 FIFA World Cup qualification
6.	5 June 2025	Prince Faisal bin Fahd Sports City Stadium, Riyadh, Saudi Arabia	North Korea	1–2	2–2	2026 FIFA World Cup qualification

== Honours ==
Kairat

- Kazakhstan Premier League: 2020
- Winner of the Kazakhstan Cup (2021)

FK Njoman Hrodna

- Silver medalist of the Belarusian Championship (2024)
- Winner of the Belarusian Cup (2024)

Individual

- Kyrgyzstan Footballer of the Year: 2019
