= Daniyar Usenov (footballer) =

Kazakhstani footballer

Personal information
- Full name: Daniyar Bekturuly Usenov
- Date of birth: 18 February 2001 (age 25)
- Place of birth: Aktau, Kazakhstan
- Height: 1.81 m (5 ft 11 in)
- Position: Midfielder

Team information
- Current team: Caspiy
- Number: 47

Senior career*
Years	Team	Apps	(Gls)
2020–2025	Kairat	46	(3)
2023	→ Caspiy (loan)	19	(3)
2024	→ Zhetysu (loan)	18	(2)
2025–2026	Tobol	3	(0)
2025	→ Aktobe (loan)	14	(1)
2025	→ Aktobe II (loan)	1	(0)
2026–	Caspiy	12	(0)

International career^{‡}
2020–2022	Kazakhstan U-21	6	(0)
- * Club domestic league appearances and goals as of 1 November 2026 ‡ National team caps and goals as of 10 June 2022

Daniyar Bekturuly Usenov (Kazakh: Данияр Бектұрұлы Үсенов, Daniiar Bektūrūly Üsenov; born 18 February 2001) is a Kazakhstani footballer who plays as a midfielder for Caspiy.

== Career statistics ==
=== Club ===
As of match played 30 October 2022.

Club	Season	League			Cup		Continental		Other		Total	
Club	Season	Division	Apps	Goals	Apps	Goals	Apps	Goals	Apps	Goals	Apps	Goals
Kairat	2020	Kazakhstan Premier League	8	2	0	0	1 (Note: Appearances in the UEFA Europa League)	0	0	0	9	2
Kairat	2021	Kazakhstan Premier League	15	1	4	0	3 (Note: One appearance each in the UEFA Champions League, UEFA Europa League and UEFA Europa Conference League)	0	2 (Note: Appearances in the Kazakhstan Super Cup)	0	4	1
Kairat	2022	Kazakhstan Premier League	23	0	5	1	2 (Note: Appearances in the UEFA Europa Conference League)	0	1	0	4	1
Kairat	Total		46	3	9	1	6	0	3	0	64	4
Career total			46	3	9	1	6	0	3	0	64	4
