= Kirill Kolesnichenko =

Russian footballer

Personal information
- Full name: Kirill Aleksandrovich Kolesnichenko
- Date of birth: 31 January 2000 (age 26)
- Place of birth: Kamyshin, Russia
- Height: 1.78 m (5 ft 10 in)
- Positions: Left winger; left-back

Team information
- Current team: Volgar Astrakhan
- Number: 19

Youth career
- –2011: SDYuSShOR-2 Kamyshin
- 2011–2016: Chertanovo Education Center

Senior career*
Years	Team	Apps	(Gls)
2015–2020	Chertanovo Moscow	41	(6)
2018	→ SKA-Khabarovsk (loan)	1	(0)
2018–2019	→ Chertanovo-2 Moscow	6	(0)
2020–2021	Kairat	0	(0)
2020	→ Rotor Volgograd (loan)	2	(0)
2021	→ SKA-Khabarovsk (loan)	15	(0)
2021–2022	Ural Yekaterinburg	18	(0)
2021–2022	Ural-2 Yekaterinburg	4	(0)
2023–2024	Rodina-2 Moscow	3	(0)
2023–2024	Rodina Moscow	11	(0)
2023–2024	→ Leningradetst (loan)	18	(1)
2024	Amkar Perm	6	(0)
2025	Surkhon	10	(1)
2025–	Volgar Astrakhan	38	(3)

International career^{‡}
2015–2016	Russia U-16	9	(3)
2016–2017	Russia U-17	20	(8)
2017–2018	Russia U-18	7	(2)
2018–2019	Russia U-19	3	(1)
- * Club domestic league appearances and goals as of 15 November 2026 ‡ National team caps and goals as of 22 February 2019

Kirill Aleksandrovich Kolesnichenko (Russian: Кирилл Александрович Колесниченко; born 31 January 2000) is a Russian football player who plays as a left winger or left-back for Volgar Astrakhan.

== Club career ==
Kolesnichenko made his debut in the Russian Professional Football League for Chertanovo Moscow on 30 May 2016 in a game against Lokomotiv Liski.

Kolesnichenko made his Russian Premier League debut for SKA-Khabarovsk on 17 March 2018 in a game against Ural Yekaterinburg.

On 26 March 2020, Kairat announced the signing of Kolesnichenko on a three-year contract.

On 3 September 2020, he joined Rotor Volgograd on loan. On 20 January 2021, Rotor and SKA-Khabarovsk reached a "sub-loan" agreement, according to which Kolesnichenko re-joined SKA until the end of the 2020–21 season.

On 17 June 2021, he signed a long-term contract with Ural Yekaterinburg. On 18 August 2022, Kolesnichenko's contract with Ural was terminated by mutual consent.

== Career statistics ==
As of 21 May 2022

Club	Season	League			Cup		Continental		Other		Total	
Club	Season	Division	Apps	Goals	Apps	Goals	Apps	Goals	Apps	Goals	Apps	Goals
Chertanovo Moscow	2015–16	PFL	1	0	–		–		–		1	0
Chertanovo Moscow	2017–18	PFL	10	0	1	0	–		4 (Note: Appearances in the FNL Cup)	0	15	0
Chertanovo Moscow	2018–19	FNL	30	6	1	0	–		4	2	35	8
Chertanovo Moscow	Total		41	6	2	0	0	0	8	2	51	8
SKA-Khabarovsk (loan)	2017–18	RPL	1	0	0	0	–		–		1	0
Chertanovo-2 Moscow	2018–19	PFL	6	0	–		–		–		6	0
Kairat	2020	KPL	0	0	–		0	0	–		0	0
Rotor Volgograd (loan)	2020–21	RPL	2	0	1	0	–		–		3	0
SKA-Khabarovsk (loan)	2020–21	FNL	15	0	1	0	–		–		16	0
SKA-Khabarovsk (loan)	Total (2 spells)		16	0	1	0	0	0	0	0	17	0
Ural Yekaterinburg	2021–22	RPL	18	0	1	0	–		–		19	0
Ural-2 Yekaterinburg	2021–22	FNL 2	1	0	–		–		–		1	0
Career total			84	6	5	0	0	0	8	2	97	8
