= Nebojša Kosović =

Montenegrin footballer (born 1995)

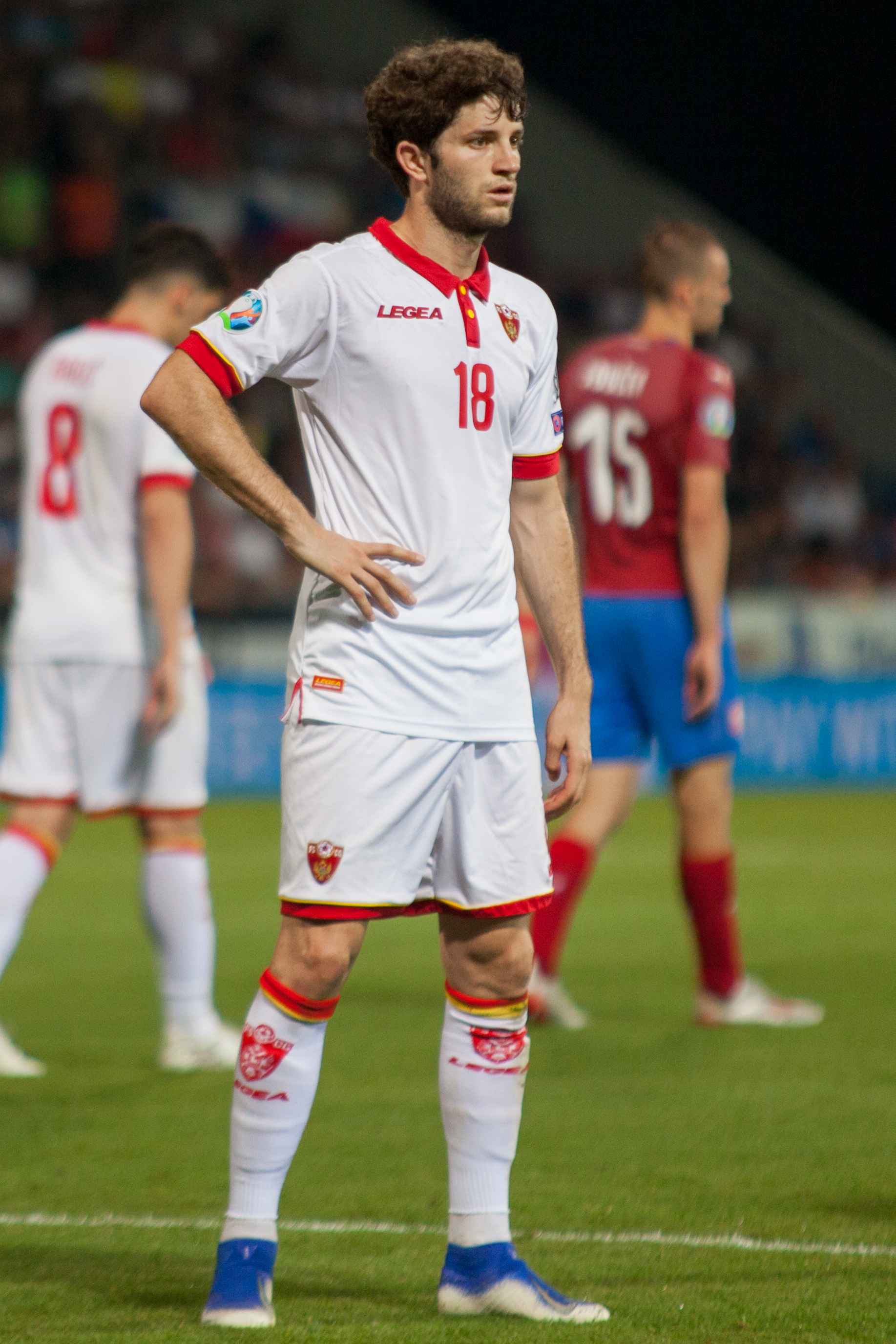
- Kosović with Montenegro in 2019

Personal information
- Date of birth: 24 February 1995 (age 31)
- Place of birth: Nikšić, Montenegro, FR Yugoslavia
- Height: 1.78 m (5 ft 10 in)
- Position: Midfielder

Team information
- Current team: Kerala Blasters

Youth career
- 2007–2011: Vojvodina

Senior career*
Years	Team	Apps	(Gls)
2011–2014	Vojvodina	30	(2)
2014–2015	Standard Liège	0	(0)
2014–2015	→ Újpest (loan)	21	(1)
2015–2019	Partizan	60	(5)
2019–2021	Kairat	57	(8)
2022–2024	Meizhou Hakka	73	(12)
2024–2025	Al-Tai	12	(0)
2025–2026	Bangkok United	12	(3)
2026–	Kerala Blasters	4	(0)

International career^{‡}
2010–2011	Montenegro U17 (Note: Only official UEFA matches included)	6	(1)
2014	Montenegro U19	3	(0)
2013–2016	Montenegro U21	15	(0)
2016–	Montenegro	34	(1)
- * Club domestic league appearances and goals as of 11 October 2026 ‡ National team caps and goals as of 16:26, 7 June 2024 (UTC)

Nebojša Kosović (Montenegrin: Небојша Косовић; born 24 February 1995) is a Montenegrin professional footballer who plays as a midfielder for Indian Super League club Kerala Blasters and the Montenegro national team.

== Club career ==
=== Vojvodina ===
Born in Nikšić, Kosović joined Vojvodina as a trainee. He made his first team debut for the club in a 3–1 home league victory over Sloboda Užice on 9 April 2011. Until the end of the 2010–11 season, Kosović recorded one more league appearance, as the club finished in third place. He subsequently signed his first professional contract with Vojvodina, penning a three-year deal in February 2012. Kosović also made one league appearance in the 2011–12 season. He scored his first senior goal for the club in a 3–3 away draw against BSK Borča on 9 March 2013. In the following 2013–14 season, Kosović scored his first goal in UEFA competitions, finding the back of the net in a 4–1 away win over Maltese club Hibernians on 4 July 2013. He also extended his contract with Vojvodina in September 2013, to last until the summer of 2017.

=== Standard Liège ===
In January 2014, Kosović was transferred to Belgian side Standard Liège. He signed a four-and-a-half-year contract with Les Rouches, before being immediately loaned to Hungarian club Újpest. Led by his former manager Nebojša Vignjević, Kosović was a member of the team that won two major trophies (Magyar Kupa and Szuperkupa). He eventually returned to Standard Liège in the 2015 winter transfer window, but failed to make any competitive appearance for their first team.

=== Partizan ===
On 7 August 2015, Kosović moved back to Serbia and signed with Partizan, penning a four-year deal. He made his debut for the club on 22 August 2015, coming on as a substitute in a 3–1 away league win over Borac Čačak. On 12 March 2016, Kosović scored his first goal for Partizan in a 3–0 home league win over Voždovac with a bicycle kick. He helped the side win the Serbian Cup in his first season with the Crno-beli. In the following 2016–17 campaign, Kosović recorded 22 appearances and scored three goals in all competitions (league and cup), as Partizan won the double. In November 2018, he extended his contract with Partizan to June 2021.

=== Kairat ===
In the spring of 2019, Kosović signed a two-year contract with Kazakh club Kairat in a €450,000 transfer from Partizan.

=== Meizhou Hakka ===
On 21 April 2022, Kosović joined Chinese Super League club Meizhou Hakka.

=== Al Tai ===
On 31 January 2025, Kosovic joined Saudi First League club Al Tai.

=== Kerala Blasters ===
Kosovic was signed by the Indian Super League club Kerala Blasters in October 2026. He made his debut for the club on 11 October 2026 against Inter Kashi FC in a 2–0 victory.

== International career ==
Kosović represented his country at the 2010 Summer Youth Olympics held in Singapore. He scored a brace in a 3–2 group stage lost against Singapore U16. Kosović also capped for Montenegro at under-17, under-19 and under-21 level.

On 29 May 2016, Kosović made his full international debut for Montenegro, coming on as a substitute in a 1–0 friendly lost away against Turkey.

On 5 September 2019, Kosović scored his first international goal in a 2–1 friendly win against Hungary.

== Personal life ==
His nickname is Kićo.

== Career statistics ==
=== Club ===
As of match played 3 June 2026

Appearances and goals by club, season and competition
Club	Season	League			National cup		League cup		Continental		Other		Total	
Club	Season	Division	Apps	Goals	Apps	Goals	Apps	Goals	Apps	Goals	Apps	Goals	Apps	Goals
Vojvodina	2010–11	Serbian SuperLiga	2	0	0	0	—		—		—		2	0
Vojvodina	2011–12	Serbian SuperLiga	1	0	0	0	—		0	0	—		1	0
Vojvodina	2012–13	Serbian SuperLiga	19	1	3	0	—		0	0	—		22	1
Vojvodina	2013–14	Serbian SuperLiga	8	1	2	0	—		3	1	—		13	2
Vojvodina	Total		30	2	5	0	—		3	1	—		38	3
Újpest (loan)	2013–14	Nemzeti Bajnokság I	8	1	4	0	0	0	—		—		12	1
Újpest (loan)	2014–15	Nemzeti Bajnokság I	13	0	3	0	5	1	—		—		21	1
Újpest (loan)	Total		21	1	7	0	5	1	—		—		33	2
Partizan	2015–16	Serbian SuperLiga	17	1	4	0	—		0	0	—		21	1
Partizan	2016–17	Serbian SuperLiga	16	3	6	0	—		0	0	—		22	3
Partizan	2017–18	Serbian SuperLiga	8	1	0	0	—		4	0	—		12	1
Partizan	2018–19	Serbian SuperLiga	19	0	1	0	—		6	0	—		26	0
Partizan	Total		60	5	11	0	—		10	0	—		81	5
Kairat	2019	Kazakhstan Premier League	17	0	0	0	—		1	0	—		18	0
Kairat	2020	Kazakhstan Premier League	16	4	0	0	—		2	0	—		18	4
Kairat	2021	Kazakhstan Premier League	24	4	2	1	—		8	0	—		34	5
Kairat	Total		57	8	2	1	—		11	0	—		70	9
Meizhou Hakka	2022	Chinese Super League	23	4	0	0	—		—		—		23	4
Meizhou Hakka	2023	Chinese Super League	23	3	0	0	—		—		—		23	3
Meizhou Hakka	2024	Chinese Super League	27	5	0	0	—		—		—		27	5
Meizhou Hakka	Total		73	12	0	0	—		—		—		73	12
Al-Tai	2024–25	Saudi First Division	12	0	0	0	—		—		1	0	13	0
Bangkok United	2025–26	Thai League 1	12	3	0	0	0	0	10	1	4	0	26	4
Career total			265	31	25	1	5	1	34	2	5	0	334	35

=== International ===
Appearances and goals by national team and year
National team	Year	Apps	Goals
Montenegro	2016	1	0
Montenegro	2017	3	0
Montenegro	2018	7	0
Montenegro	2019	7	1
Montenegro	2020	5	0
Montenegro	2021	9	0
Montenegro	2023	1	0
Montenegro	2024	1	0
Total		34	1

Scores and results list Montenegro's goal tally first.

No.	Date	Venue	Opponent	Score	Result	Competition
1.	5 September 2019	Podgorica City Stadium, Podgorica, Montenegro	Hungary	1–1	2–1	Friendly

== Honours ==
Újpest

- Magyar Kupa: 2013–14
- Szuperkupa: 2014

Partizan

- Serbian SuperLiga: 2016–17
- Serbian Cup: 2015–16, 2016–17, 2017–18

Kairat

- Kazakhstan Premier League: 2020
- Kazakhstan Cup: 2021
