= Aybol Abiken =

Kazakhstani footballer

Personal information
- Full name: Aybol Yerbolatuly Abiken
- Date of birth: 1 June 1996 (age 30)
- Place of birth: Almaty, Kazakhstan
- Height: 1.90 m (6 ft 3 in)
- Position: Defender

Team information
- Current team: Kyzylzhar

Youth career
- 2015–2017: Kairat

Senior career*
Years	Team	Apps	(Gls)
2017–2022	Kairat	79	(10)
2022	→ Aksu (loan)	7	(3)
2024	Ordabasy	15	(0)
2025–2026	Kaisar	37	(4)
2026–	Kyzylzhar	8	(1)

International career^{‡}
2017–2018	Kazakhstan U21	6	(0)
2019–	Kazakhstan	20	(1)
- * Club domestic league appearances and goals as of 1 November 2026 ‡ National team caps and goals as of 17:00, 18 November 2026 (UTC)

Aybol Yerbolatuly Abiken (Kazakh: Айбол Ерболатұлы Әбікен, Aibol Erbolatūly Äbıken; born 1 June 1996) is a Kazakhstani footballer who plays as a defender for Kyzylzhar.

== Career ==
=== Club ===
Abiken made his professional debut for FC Kairat in the Kazakhstan Premier League on 29 April 2017, coming on as a substitute in the 87th minute for Bauyrzhan Islamkhan in the match against FC Akzhayik, which finished as a 4–1 home win.

On 25 November 2019, Abiken signed a new three-year contract with FC Kairat.

On 27 February 2022, Abiken signed for Aksu on loan for the 2022 season.

In June 2022, Abiken was banned for three-years after being found to have taken Meldonium.

In January 2023, it became known that the player's suspension was reduced from 4 to 2 years. He is expected to enter the field in 2024.

=== International ===
Abiken made his Kazakhstan national football team debut on 9 September 2019 in a Euro 2020 qualifier against Russia. He started the game and played the whole match.

== Career statistics ==
=== Club ===
As of match played 9 December 2021

Club	Season	League			National Cup		Continental		Other		Total	
Club	Season	Division	Apps	Goals	Apps	Goals	Apps	Goals	Apps	Goals	Apps	Goals
Kairat	2017	Kazakhstan Premier League	4	1	0	0	1	0	0	0	21	0
Kairat	2018	Kazakhstan Premier League	10	0	5	0	1	0	0	0	21	0
Kairat	2019	Kazakhstan Premier League	28	4	2	0	4	0	1	0	21	0
Kairat	2020	Kazakhstan Premier League	16	3	-		2	0	-		15	3
Kairat	2021	Kazakhstan Premier League	21	2	8	1	9	2	2	0	40	5
Kairat	2022	Kazakhstan Premier League	0	0	0	0	0	0	0	0	0	0
Kairat	Total		79	10	15	1	17	2	3	0	114	13
Aksu (loan)	2022	Kazakhstan Premier League	7	3	0	0	-		-		7	3
Career total			86	13	15	1	17	2	3	0	121	16

=== International ===
Kazakhstan
Year	Apps	Goals
2019	4	0
2020	6	1
Total	10	1

Statistics accurate as of match played 15 November 2020

==== International goals ====
Scores and results list Kazakhstan's goal tally first.

No.	Date	Venue	Opponent	Score	Result	Competition
1.	15 November 2020	Arena Kombëtare, Tirana, Albania	Albania	1–2	1–3	2020–21 UEFA Nations League C
