= 2020 Kazakhstan Premier League =

Kazakhstan Premier League
- Season: 2020
- Champions: Kairat
- Relegated: Okzhetpes
- Champions League: Kairat
- Europa Conference League: Tobol; Astana; Shakhter Karagandy
- Matches: 78
- Goals: 195 (2.5 per match)
- Top goalscorer: João Paulo (11 goals)
- Biggest home win: Kairat 5–0 Okzhetpes (11 March 2020)
- Biggest away win: Tobol 0–4 Ordabasy (16 September 2020); Tobol 0–4 Kairat (26 October 2020); Okzhetpes 1–5 Astana (26 October 2020); Caspiy 0–4 Shakhter Karagandy (27 November 2020)
- Highest scoring: Okzhetpes 3–3 Kairat (27 September 2020); Zhetysu 2–4 Kairat (18 October 2020); Okzhetpes 1–5 Astana (26 October 2020); Taraz 2–4 Shakhter Karagandy (8 November 2020)
- Longest winning run: 6 matches Kairat
- Longest unbeaten run: 15 matches Kairat
- Longest winless run: 7 matches Okzhetpes
- Longest losing run: 5 matches Okzhetpes; Caspiy
- All statistics correct as of 23 December 2020.

The 2020 Kazakhstan Premier League was the 29th season of the Kazakhstan Premier League, the highest football league competition in Kazakhstan. FC Astana were the defending champions after winning their sixth title the previous season.

== Season events ==
=== COVID-19 ===
On 13 March, the Football Federation of Kazakhstan announced all league fixtures would be played behind closed doors for the foreseeable future due to the COVID-19 pandemic. On 16 March the Football Federation of Kazakhstan suspended all football until 15 April.

On 26 June, it was announced that the league would resume on 1 July, with no fans being permitted to watch the games. The league was suspended for a second time on 3 July, for an initial two weeks, due to an increase in COVID-19 cases in the country.

=== Irtysh Pavlodar ===
On 30 May, the Professional Football League of Kazakhstan announced that Irtysh Pavlodar had withdrawn from the league due to financial issues, with all their matches being excluded from the league results.

== Teams ==
FC Aktobe and FC Atyrau were relegated at the end of the 2019 season, and were replaced by FC Kyzylzhar and FC Caspiy.

=== Team overview ===
Locations of teams in the 2020 Kazakhstan Premier League

Team	Location	Venue	Capacity
Astana	Nur-Sultan	Nur-Sultan Arena	30,000
Caspiy	Aktau	Zhastar Stadium	5,000
Irtysh	Pavlodar	Pavlodar Central Stadium	15,000
Kairat	Almaty	Almaty Central Stadium	25,057
Kaisar	Kyzylorda	Gany Muratbayev Stadium	7,500
Kyzylzhar	Petropavl	Karasai Stadium	11,000
Okzhetpes	Kokshetau	Alisher Sagynbayev Stadium	4,158
Ordabasy	Shymkent	Kazhymukan Munaitpasov Stadium	20,000
Shakhter	Karaganda	Shakhter Stadium	20,000
Taraz	Taraz	Yerkebulan Babayev Stadium	11,525
Tobol	Kostanay	Bauyrzhan Sagintayev Stadium	10,500
Zhetysu	Taldykorgan	Samat Suyumbayev Stadium	4,000

=== Personnel and kits ===
Note: Flags indicate national team as has been defined under FIFA eligibility rules. Players and Managers may hold more than one non-FIFA nationality.

Team	Manager	Captain	Kit manufacturer	Shirt sponsor
Astana	(Russia) Andrey Tikhonov	(Kazakhstan) Dmitri Shomko	(Germany) Adidas	Samruk-Kazyna
Caspiy	(Serbia) Srđan Blagojević	(Kazakhstan) Ruslan Sakhalbaev	(United States) Nike	—
Irtysh	(Uzbekistan) Samvel Babayan	(Kazakhstan) Nikita Kalmykov	(Germany) Puma	ENRC
Kairat	(Kazakhstan) Talgat Baysufinov	(Kazakhstan) Bauyrzhan Islamkhan	(United States) Nike	1xBet
Kaisar	(Bulgaria) Stoycho Mladenov	(Kazakhstan) Maksat Baizhanov	(United States) Nike	—
Kyzylzhar	(Moldova) Veaceslav Rusnac	(Georgia (country)) Shota Grigalashvili	(United States) Nike	—
Okzhetpes	(Kazakhstan) Andrei Karpovich	(Kazakhstan) Yaroslav Baginsky	(Germany) Adidas	—
Ordabasy	(Georgia (country)) Kakhaber Tskhadadze	(Argentina) Pablo Fontanello	(United States) Nike	Aysu Mineral Water
Shakhter	(Kazakhstan) Konstantin Gorovenka	(Kazakhstan) Evgeniy Tarasov	(United States) Nike	BTL Kazakhstan
Taraz	(Kazakhstan) Vladimir Nikitenko	(Kazakhstan) Ilya Vorotnikov	(United States) Nike	—
Tobol	(Kazakhstan) Grigori Babayan	(Kazakhstan) Azat Nurgaliev	(Germany) Adidas	Polymetal
Zhetysu	(Kazakhstan) Dmitriy Ogai	(Kazakhstan) Almat Bekbaev	(Germany) Adidas	—

=== Foreign players ===
The number of foreign players was restricted to eight per KPL team. A team could use only five foreign players on the field in each game. For the 2020 season, the KFF announced that players from countries of the Eurasian Economic Union would not be counted towards a club's foreign player limit.

Club	Player 1	Player 2	Player 3	Player 4	Player 5	Player 6	Player 7	Player 8	Player 9
Astana	(Croatia) Luka Šimunović	(Croatia) **Marin Tomasov**	(Cyprus) **Pieros Sotiriou**	(Iceland) **Rúnar Már Sigurjónsson**	(Montenegro) **Žarko Tomašević**	(Romania) **Dorin Rotariu**	(Serbia) Uroš Radaković	(Serbia) **Antonio Rukavina**	
Caspiy	(Croatia) Branko Čubrilo	(France) Billal Sebaihi	(Serbia) Stefan Bukorac	(Serbia) Marko Milošević	(Ukraine) Maksym Marusych				
~~Irtysh~~									
Kairat	(Brazil) **Vágner Love**	(Croatia) Dino Mikanović	(Montenegro) **Nebojša Kosović**	(Poland) **Jacek Góralski**	(Poland) Konrad Wrzesiński	(Serbia) Rade Dugalić	(Ukraine) Aderinsola Eseola		
Kaisar	(Bulgaria) Aleksandar Kolev	(Cameroon) Clarence Bitang	(Cape Verde) **Alvin Fortes**	(Croatia) Ivan Graf	(Georgia (country)) **Elguja Lobjanidze**	(Mozambique) **Reginaldo**	(Serbia) Aleksandar Stanisavljević		
Kyzylzhar	(Argentina) Pablo Podio	(The Gambia) **Momodou Ceesay**	(Georgia (country)) **Shota Grigalashvili**	(Ivory Coast) **Moussa Koné**	(Lithuania) **Vytautas Andriuškevičius**	(Moldova) Mihai Plătică	(Montenegro) Uroš Delić	(Ukraine) Artem Baranovskyi	(Ukraine) Maksym Drachenko
Okzhetpes	(Brazil) Gian	(Estonia) **Artjom Dmitrijev**	(Moldova) Vsevolod Nihaev	(Montenegro) Marko Obradović	(Montenegro) **Darko Zorić**	(Nigeria) Aliyu Abubakar	(Serbia) Milan Stojanović	(Ukraine) Taras Bondarenko	
Ordabasy	(Argentina) Pablo Fontanello	(Belgium) Ziguy Badibanga	(Bosnia and Herzegovina) Mirzad Mehanović	(Brazil) João Paulo	(Portugal) Rúben Brígido	(South Africa) **May Mahlangu**	(Senegal) Abdoulaye Diakate	(Serbia) Aleksandar Simčević	
Shakhter	(Cameroon) Abdel Lamanje	(Estonia) **Sergei Zenjov**	(Ghana) **Gideon Baah**	(Ivory Coast) Cédric Kouadio	(Nigeria) Muhammed Usman	(Turkmenistan) **Ruslan Mingazow**	(Ukraine) Yevhen Tkachuk		
Taraz	(Guinea-Bissau) **Toni Silva**	(Lithuania) **Ovidijus Verbickas**	(Montenegro) Dejan Boljević	(Montenegro) Jovan Čađenović	(Serbia) Goran Brkić	(Serbia) Bratislav Punoševac	(Togo) **Serge Nyuiadzi**		
Tobol	(Georgia (country)) **Nika Kvekveskiri**	(Georgia (country)) **Jaba Kankava**	(Ivory Coast) Senin Sebai	(North Macedonia) Aleksa Amanović	(France) Jérémy Manzorro	(Portugal) Carlos Fonseca			
Zhetysu	(Bulgaria) Martin Toshev	(Ghana) David Mawutor	(Kosovo) Donjet Shkodra	(Lithuania) **Artūras Žulpa**	(Portugal) Pedro Eugénio	(Serbia) Nenad Adamović	(Serbia) Stefan Živković		

In bold: Players that have been capped for their national team.

=== Managerial changes ===
Team	Outgoing manager	Manner of departure	Date of vacancy	Position in table	Incoming manager	Date of appointment
Tobol	(Kazakhstan) Nurbol Zhumaskaliyev (Caretaker)	End of Caretaker Role	14 December 2019	Pre-Season	(Kazakhstan) Grigori Babayan	14 December 2019
Shakhter Karagandy	(Bulgaria) Nikolay Kostov	End of Contract	30 December 2019	Pre-Season	(Ukraine) Vyacheslav Hroznyi	30 December 2019
Taraz	(Kazakhstan) Nurken Mazbayev	End of Contract	31 December 2019	Pre-Season	(Kazakhstan) Vladimir Nikitenko	16 January 2020
Astana	(Ukraine) Roman Hryhorchuk	Mutual Termination	13 January 2020	Pre-Season	(Czech Republic) Michal Bílek	14 January 2020
Shakhter Karagandy	(Ukraine) Vyacheslav Hroznyi	Mutual Termination	17 June 2020	8th	(Kazakhstan) Konstantin Gorovenka	18 June 2020
Astana	(Czech Republic) Michal Bílek	Sacked	26 August 2020	2nd	(England) Paul Ashworth (Caretaker)	26 August 2020
Astana	(England) Paul Ashworth (Caretaker)	Mutual Termination	7 October 2020	2nd	(Russia) Andrey Tikhonov	16 October 2020

== Regular season ==
=== League table ===
Pos	Team	Pld	W	D	L	GF	GA	GD	Pts	Qualification or relegation
1	Kairat (C)	20	14	3	3	48	19	+29	45	Qualification for the Champions League first qualifying round
2	Tobol	20	12	2	6	26	16	+10	38	Qualification for the Europa Conference League second qualifying round
3	Astana	20	11	3	6	32	21	+11	36	Qualification for the Europa Conference League second qualifying round
4	Shakhter Karagandy	20	9	5	6	29	22	+7	32	Qualification for the Europa Conference League second qualifying round
5	Ordabasy	20	9	4	7	27	26	+1	31	
6	Zhetysu	20	9	1	10	27	28	−1	28	
7	Kaisar	20	6	6	8	20	23	−3	24	
8	Taraz	20	5	8	7	19	23	−4	23	
9	Kyzylzhar	20	6	5	9	15	24	−9	23	
10	Caspiy	20	5	2	13	15	34	−19	17	
11	Okzhetpes (R)	20	2	5	13	16	38	−22	11	Relegation to the Kazakhstan First Division
12	Irtysh Pavlodar (D, R)	0	0	0	0	0	0	0	0	Withdrawn, relegated to the Kazakhstan First Division

Source: UEFA, Soccerway
Rules for classification: 1) Points; 2) Goal difference; 3) Matches won; 4) Goals scored; 5) Away goals scored; 6) Head-to-head points; 7) Head-to-head matches won; 8) Head-to-head goal difference; 9) Head-to-head goals scored; 10) Head-to-head away goals scored; 11) Draw.
(C) Champions; (D) Disqualified; (R) Relegated

=== Results ===
==== Games 1–20 ====
Home \ Away	AST	CAS	KRT	KSR	KYZ	OKZ	ORD	SHA	TAR	TOB	ZHE
Astana		1–2	0–1	3–1	4–0	2–0	1–1	1–1	1–1	1–0	3–0
Caspiy	2–3		0–3	1–0	1–1	2–1	1–2	0–4	0–2	0–1	0–2
Kairat	3–0	3–1		2–1	2–3	5–0	3–1	1–1	2–1	3–1	3–0
Kaisar	0–1	0–1	2–2		1–2	0–0	1–1	2–0	1–1	2–1	1–0
Kyzylzhar	0–1	1–0	0–1	0–0		3–1	0–0	1–3	1–0	0–1	2–1
Okzhetpes	1–5	2–2	3–3	0–1	2–1		1–3	1–1	0–0	0–2	0–1
Ordabasy	1–2	1–0	1–3	0–3	1–0	1–0		0–1	1–1	0–3	3–1
Shakhter Karagandy	3–1	2–1	1–0	0–1	0–0	2–1	0–1		1–1	1–0	1–2
Taraz	1–0	0–1	1–0	2–2	0–0	2–3	3–2	2–4		0–0	0–2
Tobol	2–0	2–0	0–4	3–0	2–0	1–0	0–4	3–1	2–0		2–0
Zhetysu	1–2	3–0	2–4	3–1	3–0	1–0	2–3	3–2	0–1	0–0	

Source: Soccerway
Legend: Blue = home team win; Yellow = draw; Red = away team win.

== Statistics ==
=== Scoring ===
- First goal of the season: Pieros Sotiriou for Astana against Kyzylzhar (7 March 2020)

=== Top scorers ===
Rank	Player	Club	Goals
1	(Brazil) João Paulo	Ordabasy	12
2	(Kazakhstan) Abat Aimbetov	Kairat	10
3	(Georgia (country)) Elguja Lobjanidze	Kaisar	8
4	(Brazil) Vágner Love	Kairat	7
5	(Iceland) Rúnar Már Sigurjónsson	Astana	6
5	(Cyprus) Pieros Sotiriou	Astana	6
5	(Kazakhstan) Aybar Zhaksylykov	Zhetysu	6
8	(Estonia) Artjom Dmitrijev	Okzhetpes	5
8	(Portugal) Pedro Eugénio	Zhetysu	5
8	(Russia) Arsen Khubulov	Shakhter Karagandy	5
8	(France) Jérémy Manzorro	Tobol	5
8	(Kazakhstan) Azat Nurgaliev	Tobol	5
8	(Kazakhstan) Aydos Tattybaev	Shakhter Karagandy	5

=== Clean sheets ===
As of matches played on 4 October 2020.

Rank	Player	Club	Clean sheets
1	(Kazakhstan) Aleksandr Zarutskiy	Kaisar	3
1	(Russia) Miroslav Lobantsev	Kyzylzhar	3
1	(Kazakhstan) Vladimir Plotnikov	Ordabasy	3
1	(Kazakhstan) Igor Shatskiy	Tobol	3
1	(Kazakhstan) Aleksandr Mokin	Tobol	3
1	(Kazakhstan) Almat Bekbaev	Zhetysu	3
1	(Kazakhstan) Stas Pokatilov	Kairat	3
8	(Kazakhstan) Nenad Erić	Astana	2
8	(Kazakhstan) Dmytro Nepohodov	Astana	2
8	(Kazakhstan) Danil Ustimenko	Kairat	2
8	(Kyrgyzstan) Marsel Islamkulov	Kaisar	2
8	(Kazakhstan) Mukhammejan Seisen	Taraz	2
8	(Kazakhstan) Andrey Shabanov	Zhetysu	2
