= Rade Dugalić =

Serbian footballer

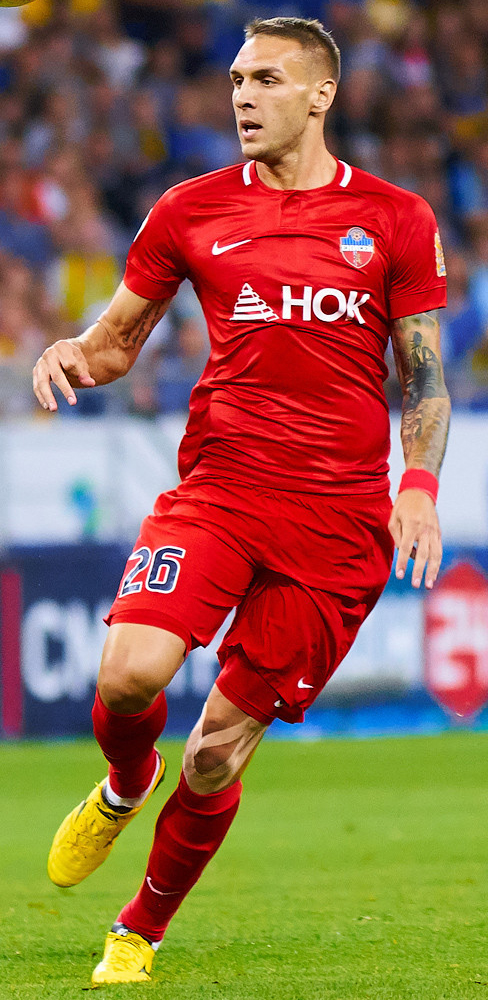
- Dugalić with Yenisey in 2018

Personal information
- Date of birth: 5 November 1992 (age 34)
- Place of birth: Prokuplje, FR Yugoslavia
- Height: 1.93 m (6 ft 4 in)
- Position: Centre-back

Team information
- Current team: Shenzhen Juniors

Youth career
- 2005–2010: Radnički Niš

Senior career*
Years	Team	Apps	(Gls)
2010–2013	Radnički Niš	3	(0)
2011	→ Olimpic Sarajevo (loan)	0	(0)
2011–2012	→ Radnik Surdulica (loan)	10	(0)
2012–2013	→ Car Konstantin (loan)	2	(0)
2013–2014	Sinđelić Niš	25	(0)
2014–2015	Ulisses	26	(2)
2015–2016	Torpedo Armavir	32	(0)
2016–2018	Tosno	64	(4)
2018–2019	Yenisey Krasnoyarsk	14	(1)
2019–2021	Kairat	67	(7)
2022–2023	Meizhou Hakka	58	(5)
2024–2025	Shenzhen Peng City	54	(8)
2026–	Shenzhen Juniors	8	(0)
- * Club domestic league appearances and goals as of 29 May 2026

Rade Dugalić (Serbian Cyrillic: Раде Дугалић, pronounced [rǎːde dǔɡalitɕ]; born 5 November 1992) is a Serbian professional footballer who plays as a centre-back for Shenzhen Juniors.

== Career ==
Born in Prokuplje, Serbia, back then within FR Yugoslavia, Dugalić started playing with FK Radnički Niš, however he spent much time on loan, first with Radnik Surdulica and then with Car Konstantin, both playing in Serbian League East, Serbian third level. In summer 2013 he moved to FK Sinđelić Niš and played with them one season.

In the season 2014–15 he played in Armenia with Ulisses.

Dugalić made his professional debut in the Russian Football National League for Torpedo Armavir on 12 July 2015 in a game against Zenit-2 St. Petersburg.

On 13 July 2018, Dugalić signed a 2-year contract with Yenisey Krasnoyarsk.

On 19 January 2019, Kairat announced the singing of Dugalić to a two-year contract.

On 21 April 2022, Dugalić joined Chinese Super League club Meizhou Hakka.

On 27 February 2024, Dugalić joined fellow Chinese Super League club Shenzhen Peng City. On 10 December 2025, the club annouanced Dugalić's departure after the 2025 season.

On 10 January 2026, Dugalić joined China League One club Shenzhen Juniors.

== Career statistics ==
As of match played 29 May 2026

Appearances and goals by club, season and competition
Club	Season	League			Cup		Continental		Other		Total	
Club	Season	Division	Apps	Goals	Apps	Goals	Apps	Goals	Apps	Goals	Apps	Goals
Ulisses	2014–15	Armenian Premier League	26	2	1	0	2	0	—		29	2
Torpedo Armavir	2015–16	Russian Football National League	32	0	2	0	—		—		34	0
Tosno	2016–17	Russian Football National League	36	4	4	0	—		—		40	4
Tosno	2017–18	Russian Premier League	28	0	3	0	—		—		31	0
Tosno	Total		64	4	7	0	10	0	0	0	71	4
Yenisey Krasnoyarsk	2018–19	Russian Premier League	14	1	1	0	6	0	—		21	1
Kairat	2019	Kazakhstan Premier League	30	5	0	0	4	1	1	0	35	6
Kairat	2020	Kazakhstan Premier League	16	1	—		2	0	—		18	1
Kairat	2021	Kazakhstan Premier League	21	1	6	4	13	0	2	0	42	5
Kairat	Total		67	7	6	4	19	1	3	0	95	12
Meizhou Hakka	2022	Chinese Super League	31	2	0	0	—		—		31	2
Meizhou Hakka	2023	Chinese Super League	27	3	0	0	—		—		27	3
Meizhou Hakka	Total		58	5	0	0	—		—		58	5
Shenzhen Peng City	2024	Chinese Super League	27	4	1	0	—		—		28	4
Shenzhen Peng City	2025	Chinese Super League	27	4	1	0	—		—		28	4
Shenzhen Peng City	Total		54	8	2	0	—		—		56	8
Shenzhen Juniors	2026	China League One	8	0	0	0	—		—		8	0
Career total			323	27	19	4	27	1	3	0	372	29

== Honours ==
Tosno

- Russian Cup: 2017–18
