= Denis Polyakov =

Belarusian footballer

Denis Polyakov Дзяніс Палякоў
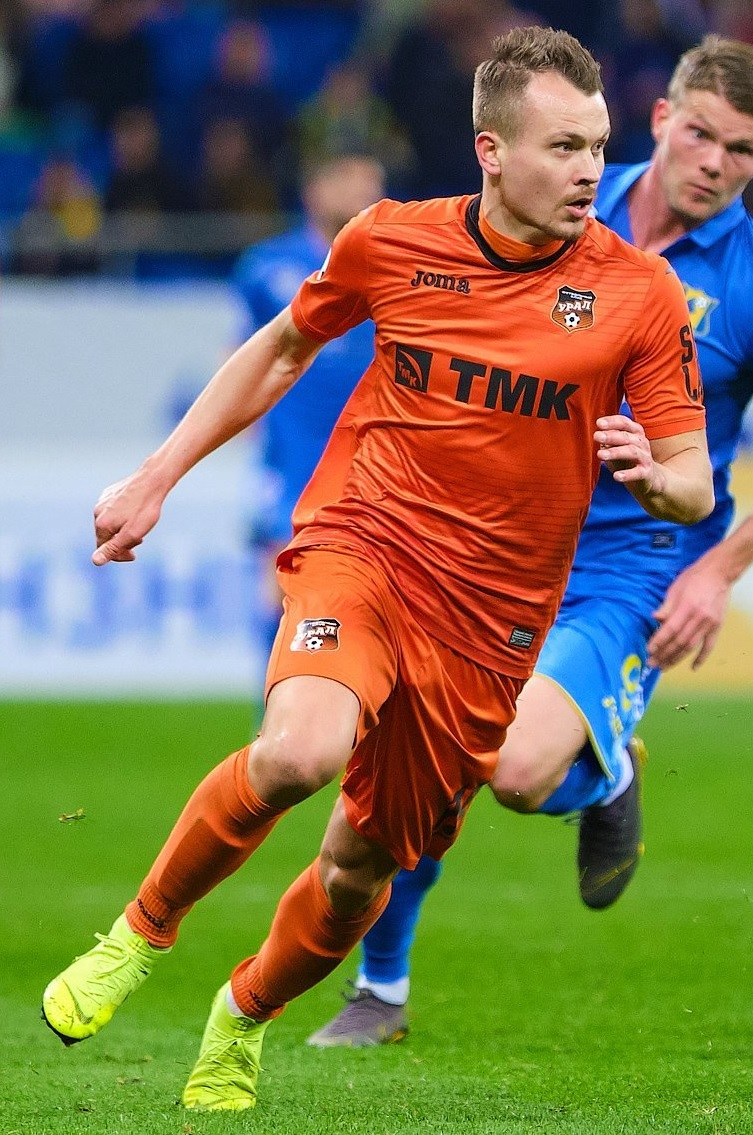
- Polyakov with FC Ural Yekaterinburg in 2019

Personal information
- Full name: Denis Aleksandrovich Polyakov
- Date of birth: 17 April 1991 (age 35)
- Place of birth: Minsk, Belarusian SSR, Soviet Union
- Height: 1.84 m (6 ft 0 in)
- Positions: Centre-back; defensive midfielder

Team information
- Current team: Arsenal Dzerzhinsk
- Number: 23

Youth career
- 2007–2009: Shakhtyor Soligorsk

Senior career*
Years	Team	Apps	(Gls)
2009–2011	Shakhtyor Soligorsk	55	(0)
2012–2017	BATE Borisov	134	(6)
2018	APOEL	16	(0)
2018	BATE Borisov	8	(1)
2019–2020	Ural Yekaterinburg	28	(0)
2020–2021	Kairat	31	(3)
2022	Astana	18	(1)
2023–2024	Hapoel Haifa	41	(0)
2024	Dinamo Minsk	7	(0)
2025	Dinamo Brest	19	(1)
2026–	Arsenal Dzerzhinsk	7	(0)

International career^{‡}
2011–2012	Belarus U21	14	(0)
2012	Belarus Olympic	5	(0)
2011–	Belarus	64	(2)
- * Club domestic league appearances and goals as of 3 July 2026 ‡ National team caps and goals as of 18 November 2024

Denis Aleksandrovich Polyakov (Belarusian: Дзяніс Аляксандравіч Палякоў, Dzyanis Alyaksandravіch Palyakow; Russian: Денис Александрович Поляков; born 17 April 1991) is a Belarusian professional footballer who plays as a centre-back or defensive midfielder for Belarusian Premier League club Arsenal Dzerzhinsk.

== Club career ==
On 28 December 2017, Polyakov moved to Cyprus, signing with APOEL.

On 25 December 2018 he signed a long-term contract with Russian Premier League club FC Ural Yekaterinburg.

On 24 August 2020, he signed a 1.5-year contract with Kazakhstani club Kairat. On 19 January 2022, Kairat announced that Polyakov had left the club at the end of his contract.

== International career ==
Polyakov was part of the Belarus U21 that finished in third place at the 2011 UEFA European Under-21 Football Championship. He was also a member of the Belarus Olympic side that participated in the 2012 Toulon Tournament and the 2012 Olympic tournament in London.

Polyakov has represented the Belarus senior national team since 2011. He was also part of the national team for the 2014 World Cup qualifiers.

== Career statistics ==
Scores and results list Belarus' goal tally first.

No	Date	Venue	Opponent	Score	Result	Competition
1.	12 June 2017	Traktor Stadium, Minsk, Belarus	New Zealand	1–0	1–0	Friendly
2.	15 October 2023	Kybunpark, St. Gallen, Switzerland	Switzerland	2–1	3–3	UEFA Euro 2024 qualifying

== Honours ==
BATE Borisov

- Belarusian Premier League: 2012, 2013, 2014, 2015, 2016, 2017, 2018
- Belarusian Cup: 2014–15
- Belarusian Super Cup: 2014, 2015, 2016, 2017

APOEL

- Cypriot First Division: 2017–18

Astana

- Kazakhstan Premier League: 2022

Belarus U21

- UEFA European Under-21 Championship bronze: 2011

== Extermanl links ==
- Denis Polyakov at Soccerway
- Denis Polyakov at FootballFacts.ru (in Russian)
