= Kryvovilka =

Rural locality in Khmelnytskyi Oblast, Ukraine

Kryvovilka Кривовілька
- Location in Khmelnytskyi Oblast Kryvovilka (Ukraine)
- Coordinates: 49°52′24″N 26°24′40″E
- Country: Ukraine
- Oblast: Khmelnytskyi Oblast
- Raion: Khmelnytskyi Raion
- Hromada: Teofipol settlement hromada
- Time zone: UTC+2 (EET)
  - Summer (DST): UTC+3 (EEST)
- Postal code: 30611

Kryvovilka (Ukrainian: Кривовілька) is a village in the Teofipol settlement hromada of the Khmelnytskyi Raion of Khmelnytskyi Oblast in Ukraine.

== History ==
The village was first mentioned as Kryva Volia in 1570.

On 19 July 2020, as a result of the administrative-territorial reform and liquidation of the Teofipol Raion, the village became part of the Khmelnytskyi Raion.

== Notable residents ==
- Borys Rudyi (1948–2017), Ukrainian sculptor
