= Serhiy Shevchuk =

Serhiy Shevchuk may refer to:

- Serhiy Shevchuk (footballer, born 1985), Ukrainian footballer
- Serhiy Shevchuk (footballer, born 1990), Ukrainian footballer
