= Volytsia-Polova =

Rural locality in Khmelnytskyi Oblast, Ukraine

Volytsia-Poliova Волиця-Польова
- Village
- Location of Volytsia-Poliova in Ukraine
- Coordinates: 49°49′40″N 26°36′36″E
- Country: Ukraine
- Oblast: Khmelnytskyi Oblast
- Raion: Khmelnytskyi Raion
- Village founded: 1593
- Council created: 1922

Government
  - Village Head: Volodymyr Shvets

Area
  - Total: 2.845 km^{2} (1.098 sq mi)
- Elevation: 295 m (968 ft)

Population (2011)
  - Total: 830 ▼
  - Density: 290/km^{2} (760/sq mi)
- Time zone: UTC+2 (EET)
  - Summer (DST): UTC+3 (EEST)
- Postal code: 30627
- Area code: +380 3844
- Website: http://rada.gov.ua/

Volytsia-Poliova (Ukrainian: Волиця-Польова) is a village and rural council (silska rada) in Khmelnytskyi Raion of Khmelnytskyi Oblast in western Ukraine. The village belongs to Teofipol settlement hromada, one of the hromadas of Ukraine. Its population was 830 as of the 2001 Ukrainian census.

== History ==
Volytsia-Poliova was first founded in 1593. The village was previously called Volytsia Khaietskoho (Ukrainian: Волиця Хаєцького). In 1922, the Volytsia-Poliova Village Council (Ukrainian: Волиця-Польова сільська рада) was created which administers the village of Volytsia-Poliova itself.

Until 18 July 2020, Volytsia-Polova belonged to Teofipol Raion. The raion was abolished in July 2020 as part of the administrative reform of Ukraine, which reduced the number of raions of Khmelnytskyi Oblast to three. The area of Teofipol Raion was merged into Khmelnytskyi Raion.

== See also ==
- Volytsia, a neighboring village in Teofipol Raion
