= Liubar =

Rural locality in Zhytomyr Oblast, Ukraine

- Rural settlement
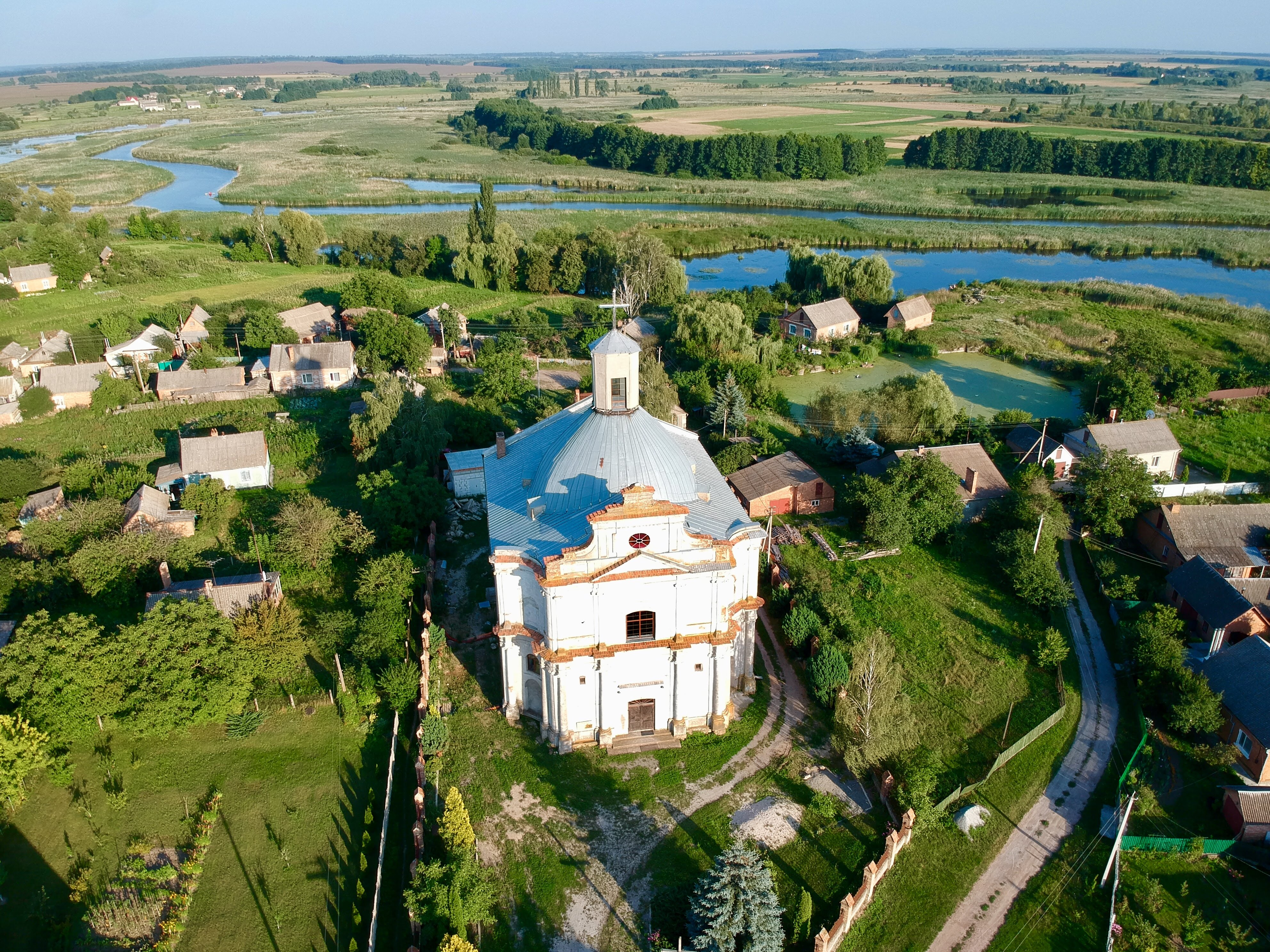
- Church of St. Michael and St. Dominic, Liubar

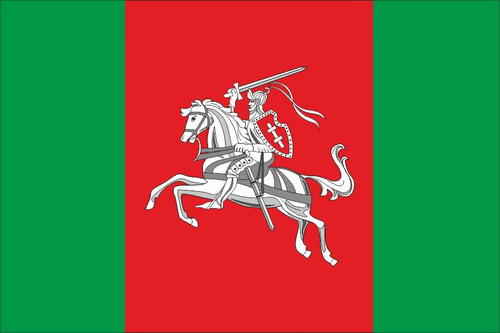
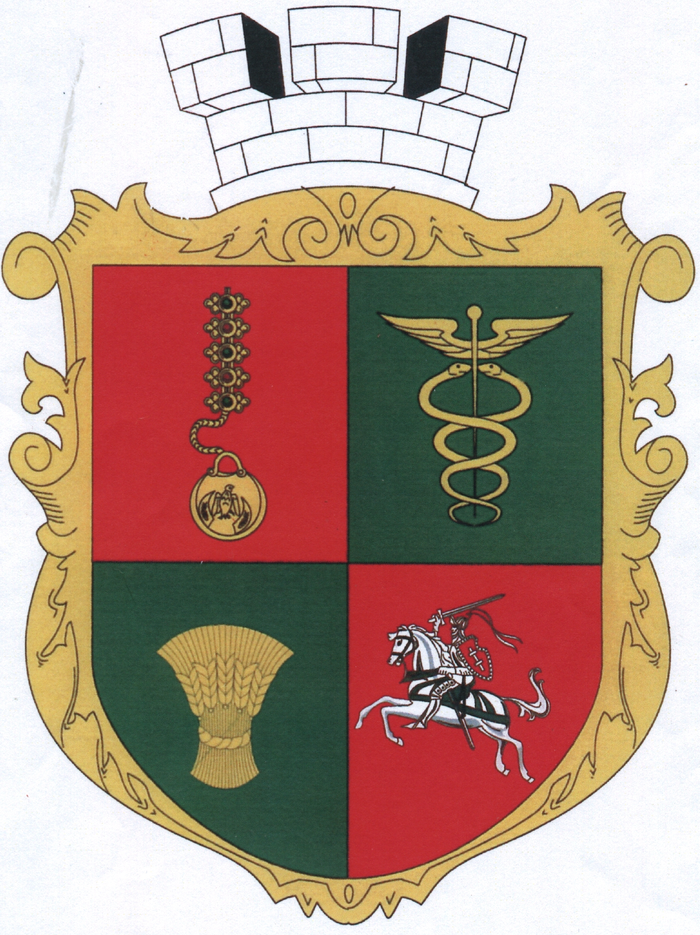
- Flag Coat of arms

- Location within Zhytomyr Oblast Location within Ukraine
- Coordinates: 49°55′22″N 27°45′40″E
- Country: Ukraine
- Oblast: Zhytomyr Oblast
- Raion: Zhytomyr Raion
- Hromada: Liubar settlement hromada

Area
  - Total: 222 km^{2} (86 sq mi)

Population (2022)
  - Total: 1,990
  - Density: 8.96/km^{2} (23.2/sq mi)
- Time zone: UTC+2 (EET)
  - Summer (DST): UTC+3 (EEST)
- Postal code: 13100

Liubar or Lyubar (Ukrainian: Любар, Polish: Lubar) is a rural settlement in Zhytomyr Raion, Zhytomyr Oblast, Ukraine. Population: 1,990 (2022 estimate) It is situated in the historic region of Volhynia.

== History ==
According to historical and archaeological data, Liubar is the possible location of the ancient Ruthenian city of Bolokhov. In the 13th century, the Bolokhov land was devastated by the military campaigns of Daniel of Galicia as well as Mongol raids.

In the 14th century, Lithuanian prince Lubart built a fortress on the Sluch River, which was named in his honour. Since 1387, the location belonged to the Grand Duchy of Lithuania. After 1569, the settlement, known in Polish as Lubartów, was divided between the Kyiv and Volhynian Voivodeship within the Lesser Poland Province of the Kingdom of Poland. At the time, it was controlled by prince Konstanty Wasyl Ostrogski and received Magdeburg rights. It was a royal town of Poland, and afterwards a private town after it was granted to the Lubomirski family in 1623. In 1630, Stanisław Lubomirski erected the Dominican Church of St. Michael. Later on, the town passed to the Walewski and Wodzicki families.

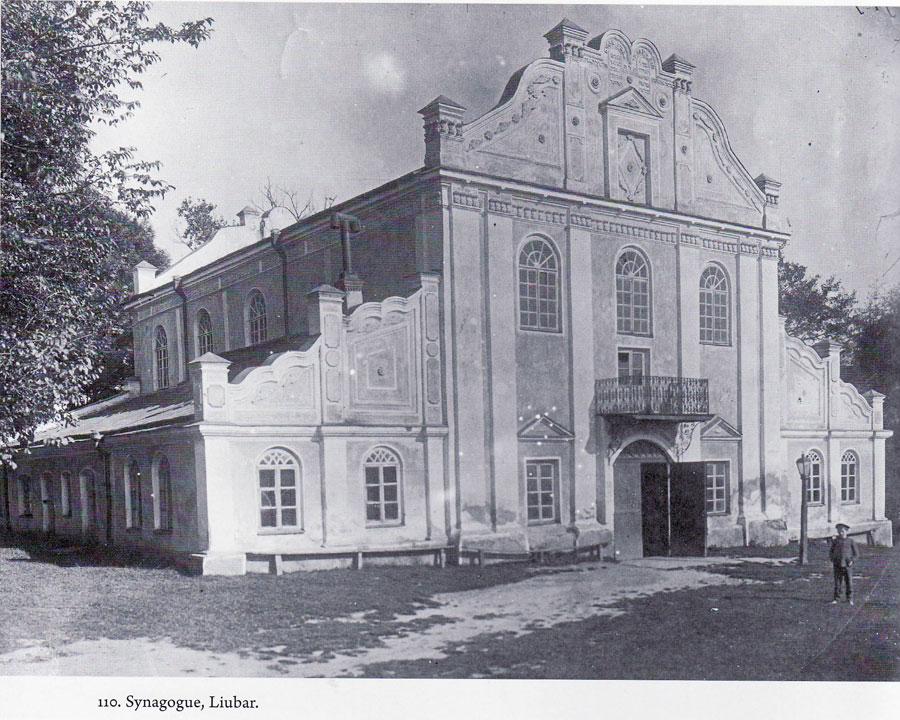
Synagogue of the town (around 1912/1914).

A Jewish community lived in Liubar for centuries. A wooden synagogue was erected in 1491. It was destroyed during pogroms perpetrated by the Cossacks in the middle of the 17th century.

In 1660, the Battle of Liubar took place between Polish-Tatar and Muscovite-Cossack forces. In 1775, the 10th Foot Grenadier Regiment of the Polish Crown Army was formed and stationed in Lubar, but was relocated to Kamieniec Podolski the following year. Cossacks destroyed the church, which was eventually rebuilt by Franciszek Ferdynant Lubomirski in the 18th century. In 1792, during the Polish-Russian War, the Battle of Boruszkowce took place near the town.

During the Second Partition of Poland, in 1793, Lubar was annexed by Russia, within which it was administratively located in the Novograd-Volynsky Uyezd in Volhynian Governorate. During the January Uprising, on May 9, 1863, it was the site of a battle between Polish insurgents led by General Edmund Różycki and the Russians, won by the Poles. In 1870, it had a population of 4,922. At the end of the 19th century, the Jewish inhabitants represented 43% of the total population. 9 synagogues, a Jewish theater, a Jewish hospital and many shops were Jewish-owned.

During the Ukrainian War of Independence in 1918, Liubar was occupied by the Red Army, which was later expelled by the German forces. In 1919, the town was fought over by Soviet forces and the Directory of Ukraine. In late 1919, Liubar was occupied by the Second Polish Republic, within which it was administered as part of the Volhynian District. In 1920, the soldiers of the 1st Cavalry Army (a formation of the Red Army) perpetrated a pogrom killing about 60 people and hurting 180. After the end of the war, the town became part of Soviet Ukraine.

A local newspaper was published in Liubar since August 1931. During the Holodomor of 1932–1933, numerous people died of hunger in the region.

On July 6, 1941, Wehrmacht occupied this town. Germans sent the Jews into a ghetto. In August 1941, mass executions killed around 300 people in the nearby forest. On September, around 1,300 Jews from the city and surroundings villages are murdered by an Einsatzgruppen including Ukrainians Hilfspolizei.

In January 1989 the population was 2656 people

After Liubar became part of independent Ukraine in 1991, an art school, a stadium and a youth sports school were opened in the settlement. Starting from 1994, the district was attached to gas pipeline

In January 2013 the population was 2179 people.

In 2016, a memorial plaque to the victims of the Holocaust was installed in Liubar. During a non-invasive archaeological survey in April 2017, the exact location of the burials could not be determined. The information stele was unveiled in June 2019.

Until 26 January 2024, Liubar was designated urban-type settlement. On this day, a new law entered into force which abolished this status, and Liubar became a rural settlement.

== Notable people ==
- Aron Vergelis (1918-1999), Soviet Yiddish writer and poet.
- Valeriy Kharchyshyn (1974), leader of the Druha Rika rock band.
