= Berezhyntsi =

Rural locality in Khmelnytskyi Oblast, Ukraine

Berezhyntsi Бережинці
- Village
- Interactive map of Berezhyntsi
- Coordinates: 49°55′06″N 26°31′03″E
- Country: Ukraine
- Oblast: Khmelnytskyi Oblast
- District: Khmelnytskyi Raion
- Village founded: 1579
- Council created: 2000

Government
  - Village Head: Yuriy Hrysiuk

Area
  - Total: 1.113 km^{2} (0.430 sq mi)
- Elevation: 271 m (889 ft)

Population (2011)
  - Total: 345 ▼
  - Density: 310/km^{2} (803/sq mi)
- Time zone: UTC+2 (EET)
  - Summer (DST): UTC+3 (EEST)
- Postal code: 30621
- Area code: +380 3844
- Website: http://rada.gov.ua/

Berezhyntsi (Ukrainian: Бережинці; Polish: Bereżyńce) is a village and village council (silska rada) in Khmelnytskyi Raion of Khmelnytskyi Oblast in western Ukraine. The village belongs to Teofipol settlement hromada, one of the hromadas of Ukraine. Its population was 537 as of the 2001 Ukrainian census.

== History ==
Berezhyntsi was first founded in 1579. In 2000, the Berezhyntsi Village Council (Ukrainian: Бережинецька сільська рада) was created, which also contains the village of Ridka within its jurisdiction.

Until 18 July 2020, Berezhyntsi belonged to Teofipol Raion. The raion was abolished in July 2020 as part of the administrative reform of Ukraine, which reduced the number of raions of Khmelnytskyi Oblast to three. The area of Teofipol Raion was merged into Khmelnytskyi Raion.
