= Bazaliia =

Rural locality in Khmelnytskyi Oblast, Ukraine

Bazaliia Базалія
- Rural settlement
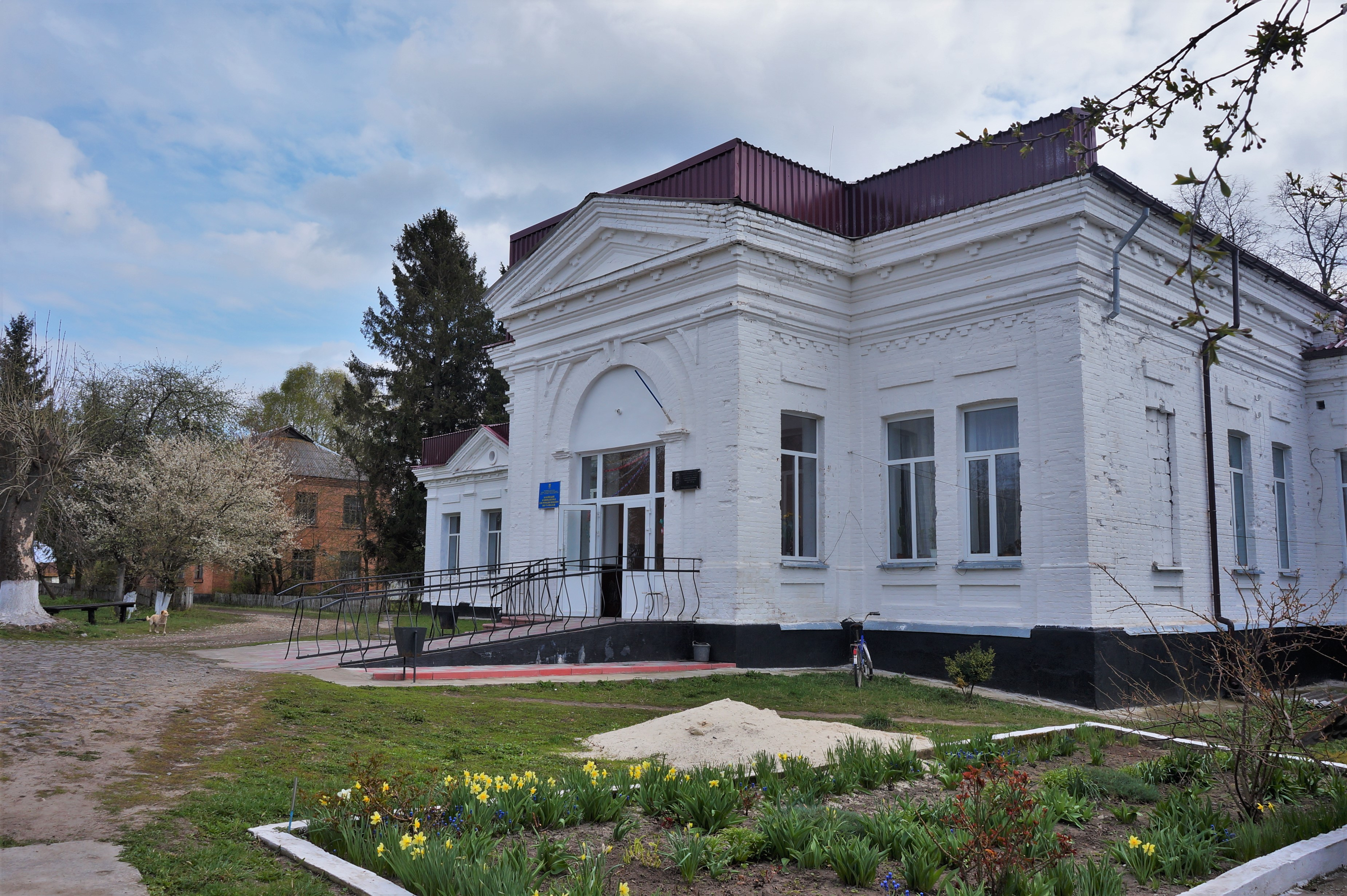
- Bazaliia hospital

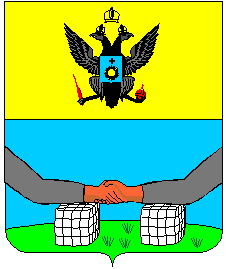
- Coat of arms

- Location within Khmelnytskyi Oblast Location within Ukraine
- Coordinates: 49.7178°N 26.4708°E
- Country: Ukraine
- Oblast: Khmelnytskyi Oblast
- Raion: Khmelnytskyi Raion
- Hromada: Teofipol settlement hromada

Population
  - Total: 1,484
- Time zone: UTC+2 (EET)
  - Summer (DST): UTC+3 (EEST)
- Postal Code: 30651

Bazaliia (Ukrainian: Базалія) is a rural settlement in Khmelnytskyi Raion, Khmelnytskyi Oblast, western Ukraine. It is located on the Sluch River. Bazaliia belongs to Teofipol settlement hromada, one of the hromadas of Ukraine. According to the 2001 census, its population was 2,114. Current population: 1,461 (2022 estimate).

== Geography ==
Bazaliia is located in the region of Eastern Podolia, in the upper flow of Sluch river.

== History ==
Bazaliia was founded in 1570. During the early 20th century it was a base of Free Cossacks. In June 1919 the village was the site of a major battle in which Sich Riflemen and 7th Zaporozhian Division of the Ukrainian People's Army fought against Bolsheviks.

In 1957 the village received the status of an urban-type settlement. Since 1924 until 1931 and since 1935 until 1959 it was the administrative centre of Bazaliia Raion.

Until 18 July 2020, Bazaliia belonged to Teofipol Raion. The raion was abolished in July 2020 as part of the administrative reform of Ukraine, which reduced the number of raions of Khmelnytskyi Oblast to three. The area of Teofipol Raion was merged into Khmelnytskyi Raion.

Until 26 January 2024, Bazaliia was designated urban-type settlement. On this day, a new law entered into force which abolished this status, and Bazaliia became a rural settlement.

== Gallery ==
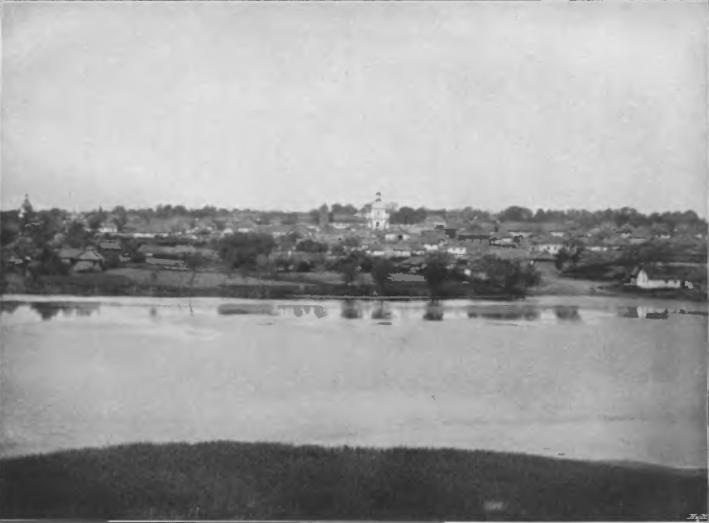
1910 view of Bazaliia

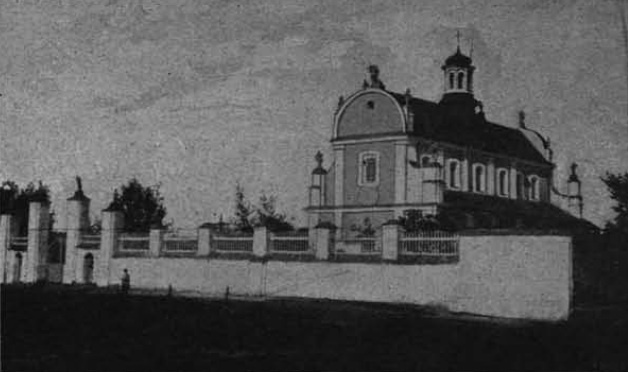
Catholic Church of Holy Trinity in Bazaliia

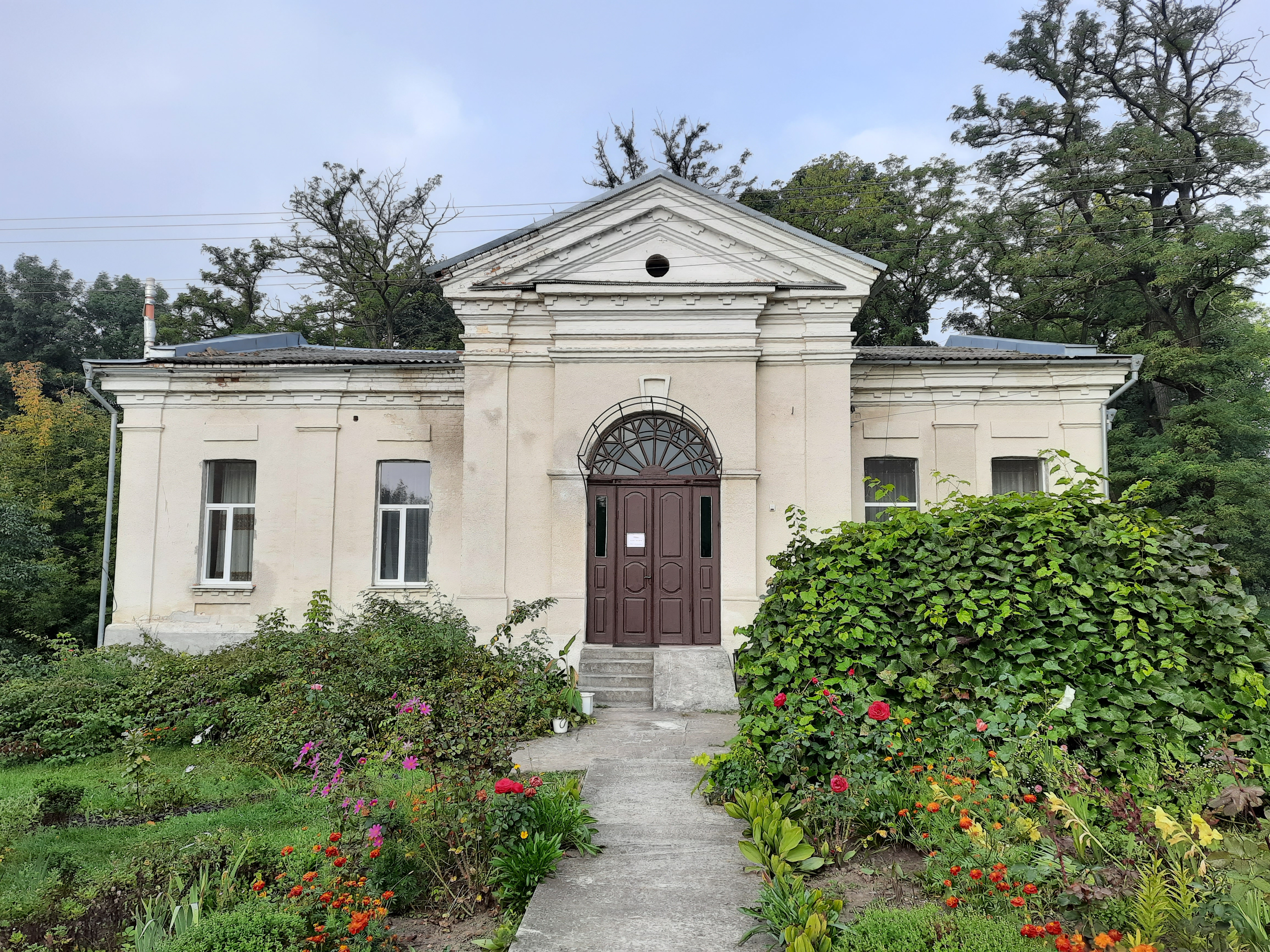
Hospital building

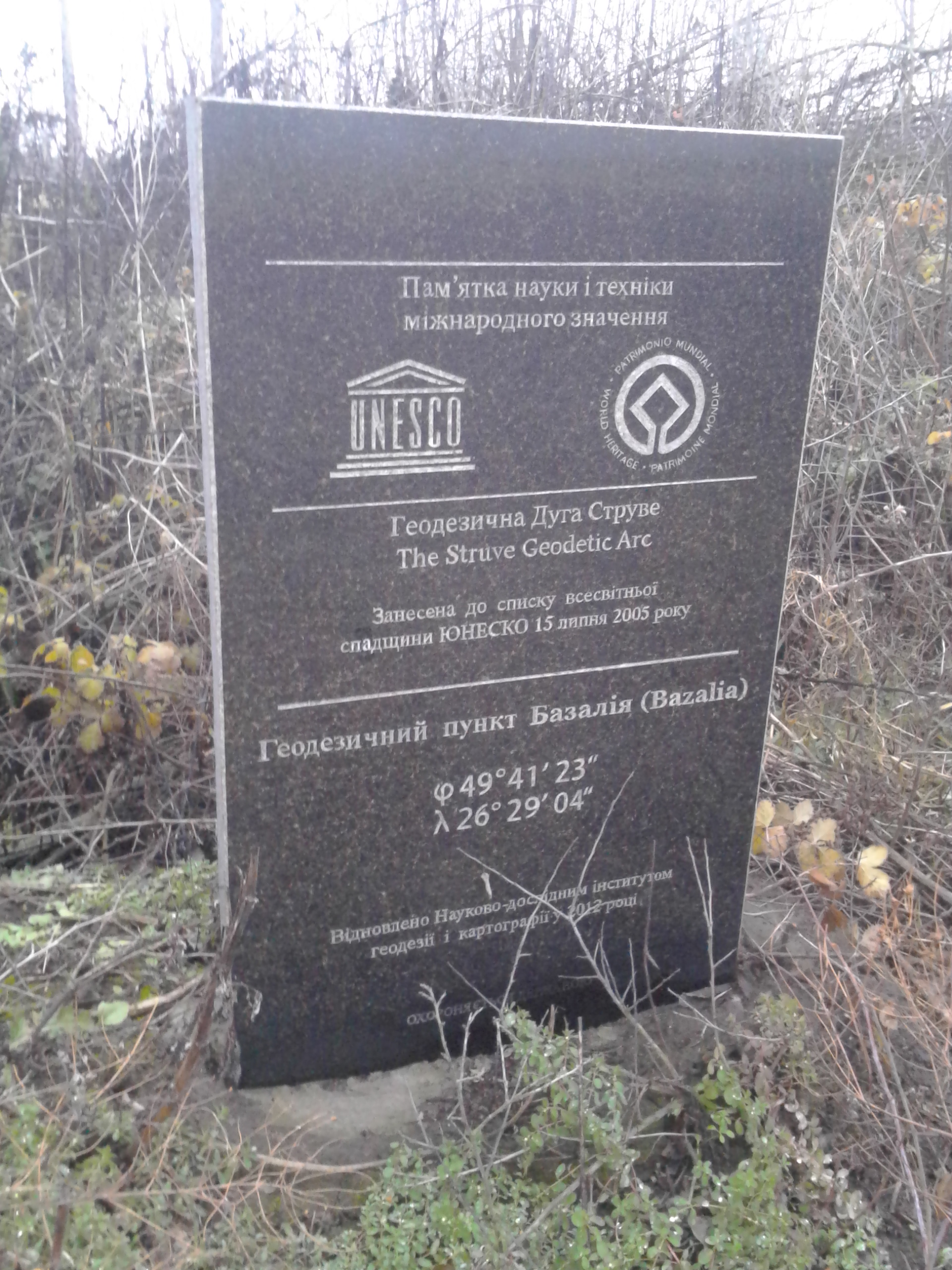
Section of the Struve Geodetic Arc in Bazaliia

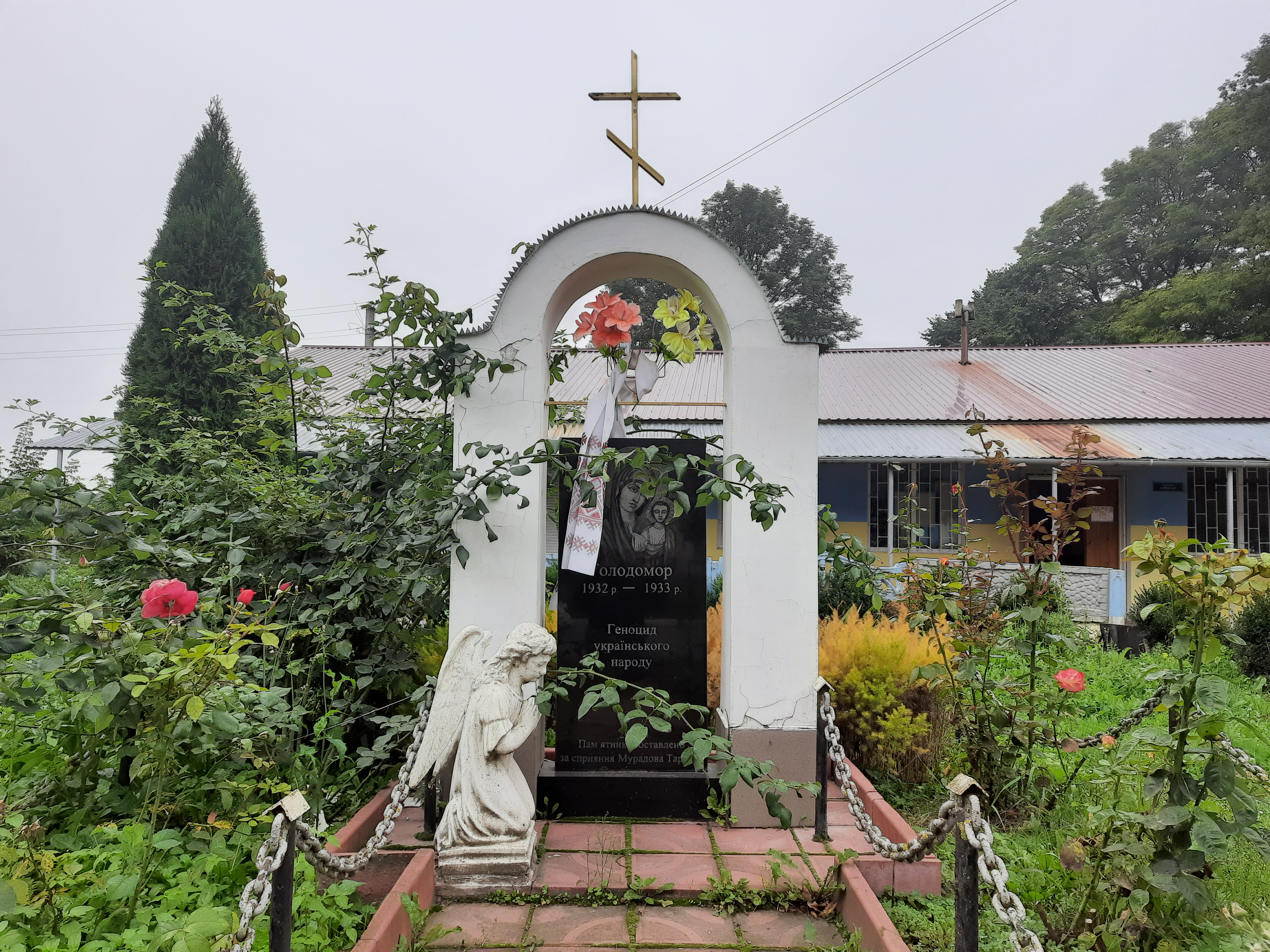
Monument to Holodomor victims

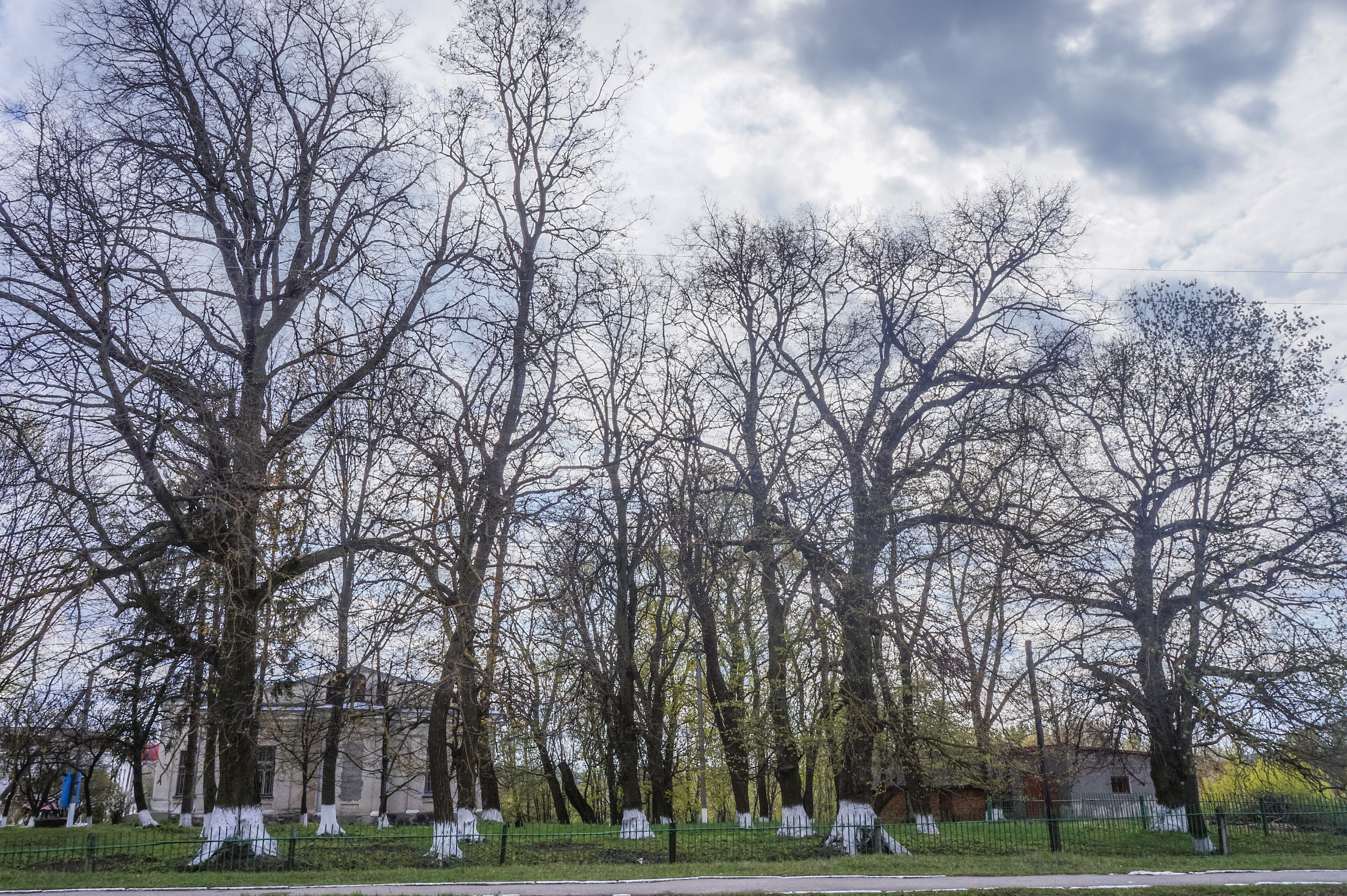
Hospital park
