= Zviahel =

City in Zhytomyr Oblast, Ukraine

Zviahel Звягель
- City
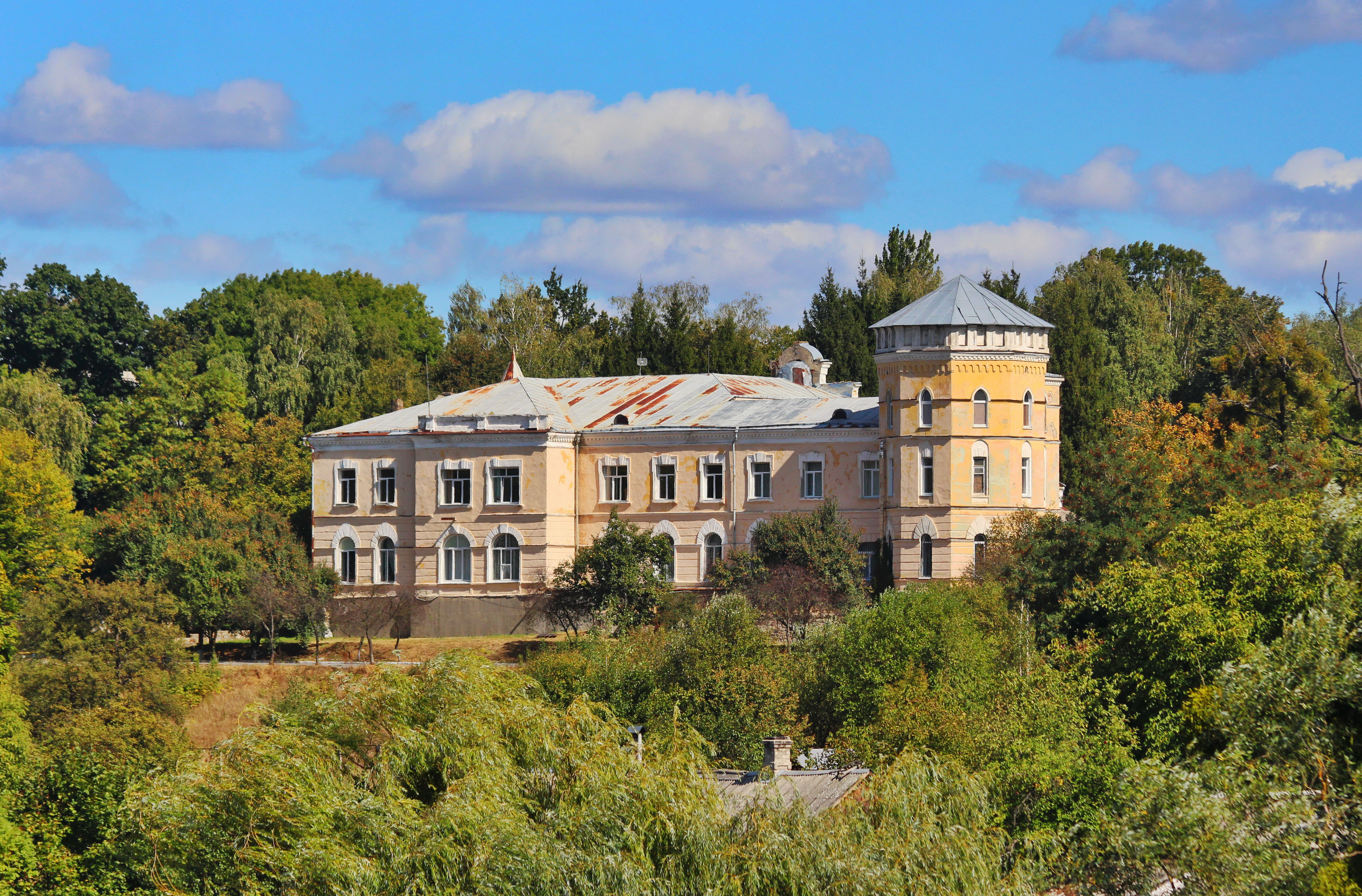
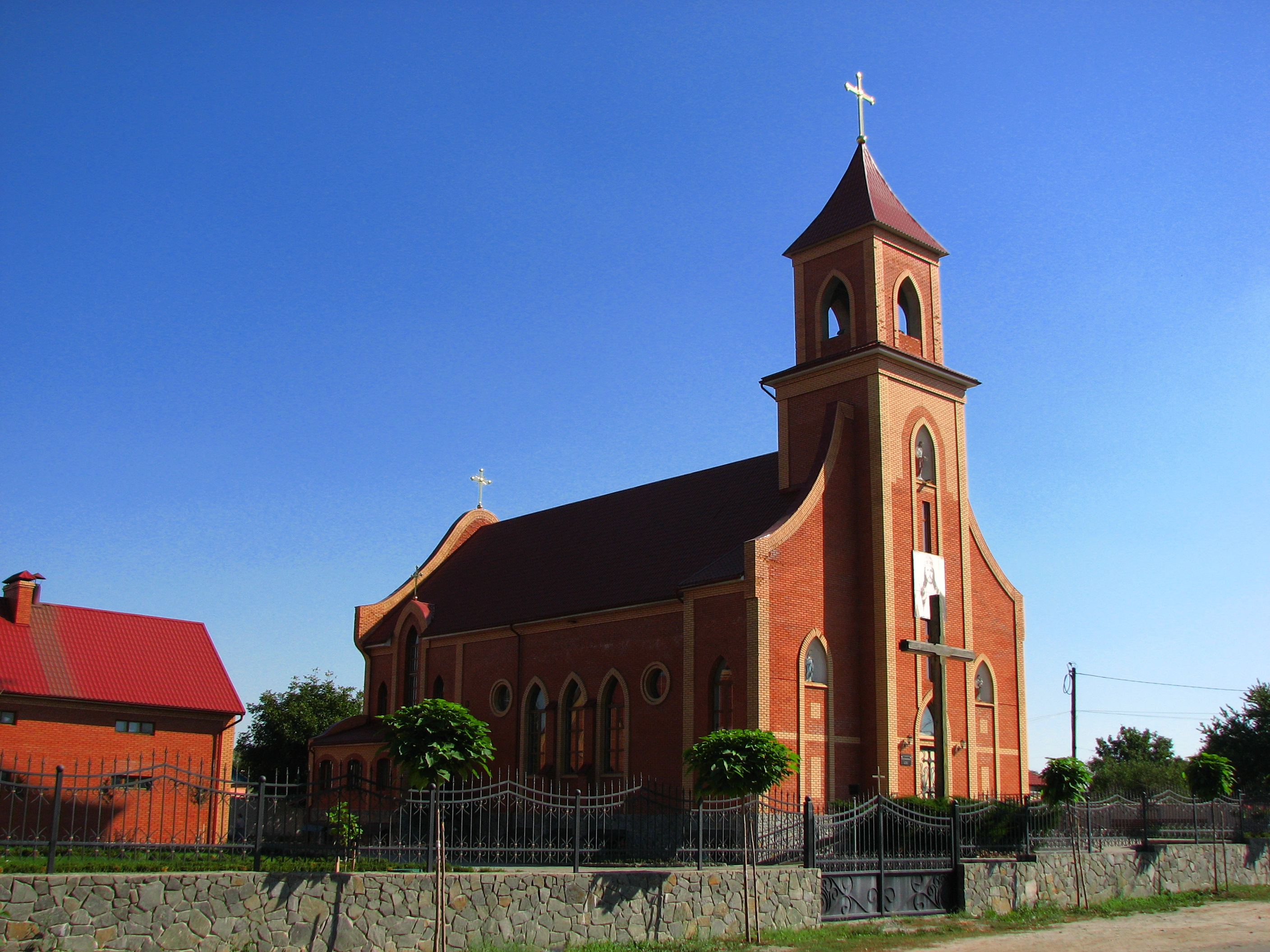
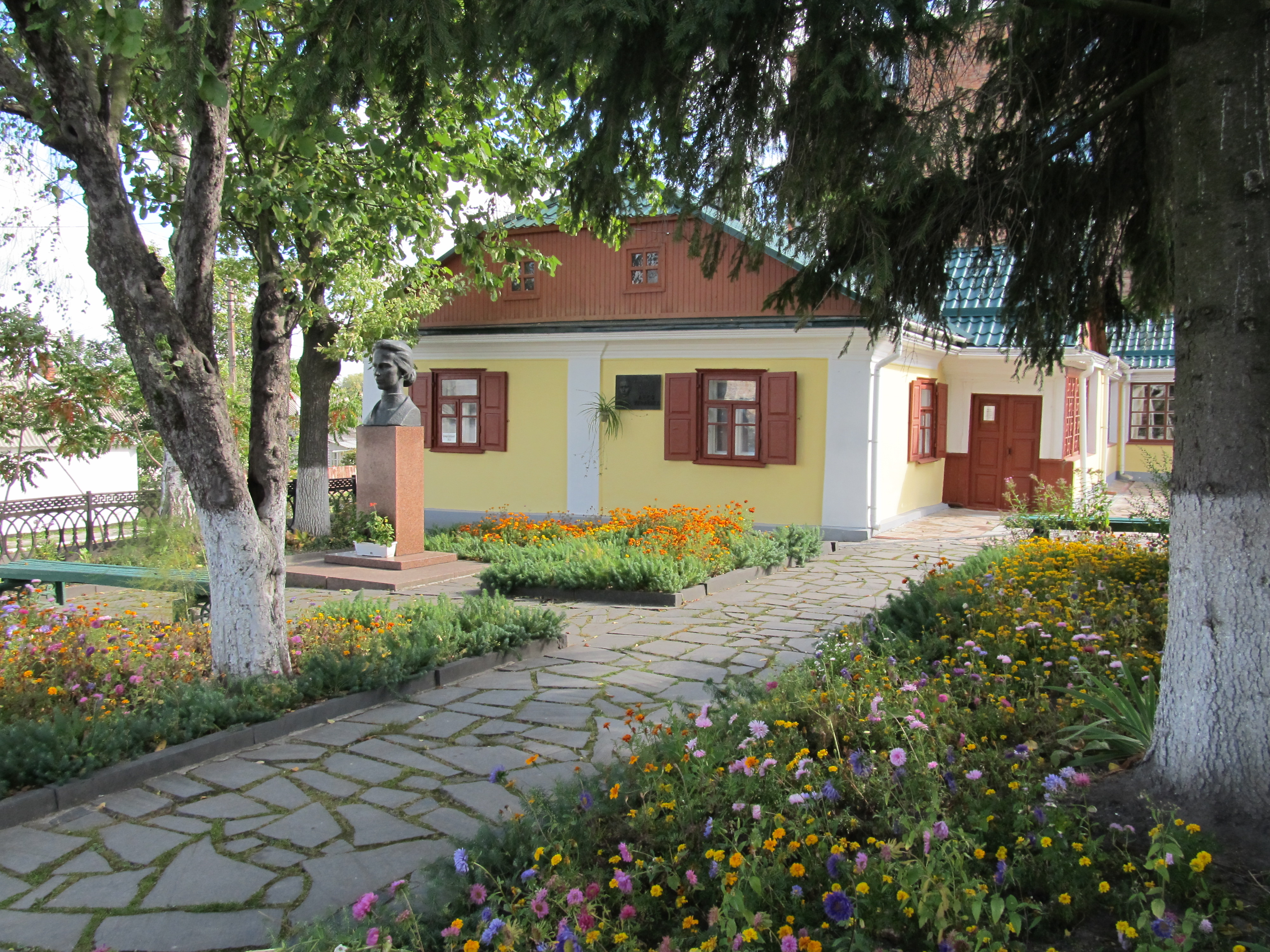
- Mezentsev Palace Church of Christ the King Museum of Lesya Ukrainka

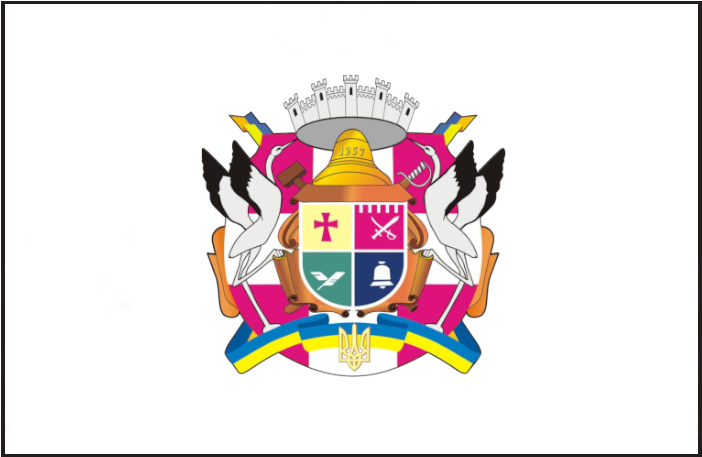
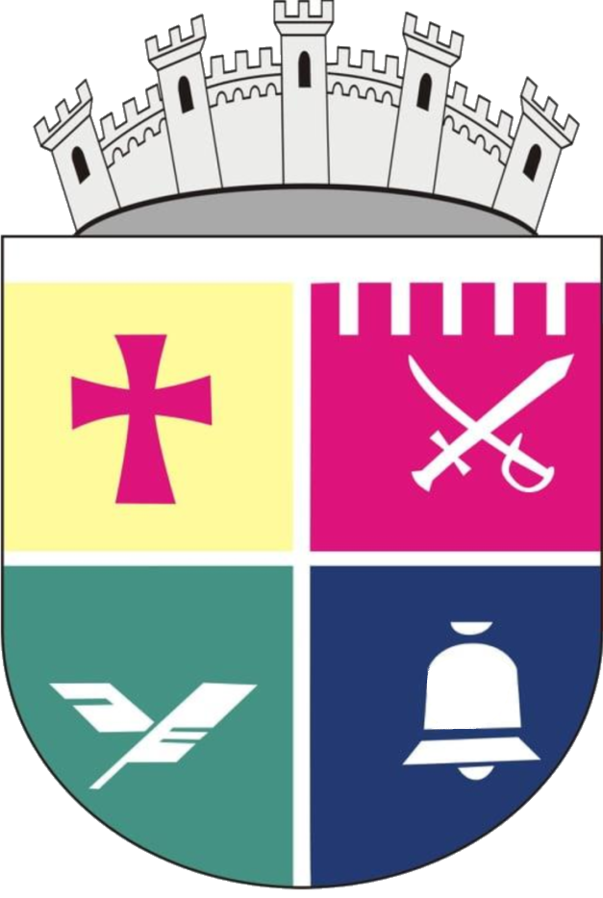
- Flag Coat of arms

- Location of Zviahel Zviahel (Ukraine)
- Coordinates: 50°35′0″N 27°38′0″E
- Country: Ukraine
- Oblast: Zhytomyr Oblast
- Raion: Zviahel Raion
- Hromada: Zviahel urban hromada
- First mentioned: 1256
- City status: 1795

Government
  - Mayor: Volodymyr Zahryvyi

Area
  - Total: 2,667 km^{2} (1,030 sq mi)
- Elevation: 218 m (715 ft)

Population (2022)
  - Total: 55,086
  - Density: 20.65/km^{2} (53.50/sq mi)
- Postal code: 11700—11709
- Area code: 1811000000
- Website: http://novograd.osp-ua.info/

Zviahel (Ukrainian: Звягель, IPA: [ˈzʲwʲɑɦelʲ]; Yiddish: זוויל, romanized: Zvil) is a city in Zhytomyr Oblast, northern Ukraine. The city serves as the administrative center of Zviahel Raion (district). According to a 2025 estimate, its population was approximately 54,3 thousand inhabitants.

The city is located on the main route that links Lviv to Kyiv (E40). It is located on the Sluch River, which forms the eastern border of Volhynia.

== Name ==
The city has previously been known as Vozviahel (Возвягель), Zviahol (Звяголь), Zviahal (Звягаль), Dzwihel and Novohrad-Volynskyi (Новоград-Волинський).

Originally known as Zviahel (from Polish: Zwiahel), the city was renamed to Novohrad-Volynskyi in 1795 after annexation of territories of Polish–Lithuanian Commonwealth by the Russian Empire soon after the Third Partition of Poland.

Since the 1991 Act of Declaration of Independence of Ukraine there have been several attempts to rename the city. Public discussions on renaming the city to Zviahel began in April 2022. On 16 June 2022 the city council renamed the city again to Zviahel. The decision was supported by 22 of the 30 deputies present, while four deputies opposed and abstained. The name change was then to be approved by the deputies of the Zhytomyr Oblast Council and the final decision on renaming the city had then to be made by the Ukrainian parliament, which took place on 16 November 2022.

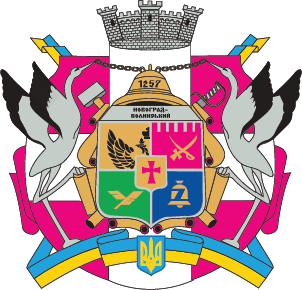
Former full coat of arms of Novohrad-Volynskyi (used 1994–2022)

On 31 March 2022, the city council decided to remove the letter Z (which was a reference to the name Zviahel) from its coat of arms (it was on the bell, in both the small and full version). This was done because the letter Z was widely used by the Russian army during the 2022 Russian invasion of Ukraine and has become a propaganda tool in Russia.

== History ==
The city was mentioned in the Galician–Volhynian Chronicle under the year of 1256 as the town of Zviahel. The original settlement was an Old Ruthenian town of Bolokhov Land located on the right bank of Sluch. In 1257 it was razed by Daniel of Galicia.

The next mentioning of the settlement is found in 1432 as a rebuilt one on the left bank upstream from the original site. Since 14th century it belonged to the Grand Duchy of Lithuania owned by Zwiahelski princely family. In 1501 to 1554 the town belonged to Ostrogski princely family. In 1507 Konstanty Ostrogski built here a castle. After formation of Volhynian Voivodeship, it was located in Lutsk County. Following the 1569 Union of Lublin it was passed on to the Crown of Poland.

During the Khmelnytsky Uprising, Cossacks destroyed portion of the city's fortification and burnt down the Catholic church (kosciol). In September 1648 in the city was formed an insurgency group of local peasants led by Mykhalo Tysha. In 1650s in Zwiahel existed Zwiahel Regiment.

In 18th century the city belonged to Lubomirski princely family.

The city had an important Jewish community. In the late 19th century it was home to 9,378 Jews, more than half the population of the town. Pogroms killed approximately 1,000 Jews in 1919. After the Treaty of Riga, Novohrad-Volynskyi became part of the Ukrainian Soviet Socialist Republic of the Soviet Union.

In 1936, part of the Polish population was expelled by the Soviets to Kazakhstan.

=== World War II ===
By the start of World War II only 6,840 Jews remained, (30% of the total population). Hundreds of Jews were murdered in mass executions perpetrated by an Einsatzgruppen in 1941. Many survivors were imprisoned in harsh conditions in a ghetto and murdered in November 1942, and an important part of the town was destroyed during the war.

A Yizkor book about Jewish life in Zviahel was published in 1962 in Tel Aviv, Israell. The book is available for purchase and for free online at yiddishbookcenter.org. It has been partially translated to English and is available online on JewishGen. Access to the book on JewishGen may require a free account.

=== 21st century ===
In February 2013, the Novohrad-Volynskyi city council decided to dismantle the monument to Lenin, which was installed in front of the city council building, and move it to Slavy Park with extra-budgetary funds. After that, the local communists sued, but the cases were lost in the first instance and in the Court of Appeal of the Zhytomyr Oblast. A sundial installation was installed instead of the Lenin monument.

In 2015, Viktor Veselskyi was elected to the post of mayor. In connection with the Law of Ukraine on decommunization in the city, the Soviet names of streets, alleys, squares and boulevards were renamed.

On 16 June 2022, the local council decided to return the historical name Zviahel to the city, and it was also proposed to change the name of the Novohrad-Volynskyi Raion (district) to Zviahel Raion. In November, the draft law was submitted to the Verkhovna Rada of Ukraine. By the resolution of the Verkhovna Rada of Ukraine dated 16 November 2022, the historical name of Zviahel was returned to the city.

== Demographics ==
=== Ethnicity ===
Distribution of the population by ethnicity according to the 2001 Ukrainian census:

Ethnic groups in Zviahel
| | percent |
| Ukrainians | 85.29% |
| Russians | 8.51% |
| Poles | 4.29% |
| Belarusians | 0.57% |
| Jews | 0.33% |
| Gypsies | 0.27% |
| Germans | 0.11% |
| Moldovans | 0.09% |
| Armenians | 0.08% |

=== Languages ===
Native language composition according to the 2001 Ukrainian census:

First languages in Zviahel
| | percent |
| Ukrainian | 54.4% |
| Russian | 45.0% |
| Romani | 0.2% |
| Belarusian | 0.1% |
| Polish | 0.1% |
| others | 0.1% |

== Geography ==
=== Climate ===
Climate data for Novohrad-Volynskyi (1981–2010)
| Month | Jan | Feb | Mar | Apr | May | Jun | Jul | Aug | Sep | Oct | Nov | Dec | Year |
|---|---|---|---|---|---|---|---|---|---|---|---|---|---|
| Mean daily maximum °C (°F) | −1.0 (30.2) | 0.3 (32.5) | 5.5 (41.9) | 14.0 (57.2) | 20.5 (68.9) | 23.0 (73.4) | 24.8 (76.6) | 24.3 (75.7) | 18.7 (65.7) | 12.5 (54.5) | 4.8 (40.6) | 0.1 (32.2) | 12.3 (54.1) |
| Daily mean °C (°F) | −3.3 (26.1) | −2.8 (27.0) | 1.5 (34.7) | 8.6 (47.5) | 14.6 (58.3) | 17.3 (63.1) | 19.1 (66.4) | 18.2 (64.8) | 13.2 (55.8) | 7.8 (46.0) | 2.0 (35.6) | −2.2 (28.0) | 7.8 (46.0) |
| Mean daily minimum °C (°F) | −5.9 (21.4) | −5.6 (21.9) | −1.8 (28.8) | 4.0 (39.2) | 9.1 (48.4) | 12.2 (54.0) | 14.1 (57.4) | 13.1 (55.6) | 8.9 (48.0) | 4.2 (39.6) | −0.3 (31.5) | −4.4 (24.1) | 4.0 (39.2) |
| Average precipitation mm (inches) | 37.8 (1.49) | 37.1 (1.46) | 37.4 (1.47) | 41.9 (1.65) | 52.6 (2.07) | 86.9 (3.42) | 92.4 (3.64) | 63.5 (2.50) | 56.6 (2.23) | 40.8 (1.61) | 44.3 (1.74) | 43.3 (1.70) | 634.6 (24.98) |
| Average precipitation days (≥ 1.0 mm) | 9.2 | 9.4 | 9.1 | 8.2 | 8.5 | 10.6 | 10.4 | 8.2 | 8.8 | 7.7 | 8.6 | 10.0 | 108.7 |
| Average relative humidity (%) | 83.6 | 81.7 | 77.2 | 68.3 | 67.9 | 72.8 | 74.1 | 74.1 | 78.4 | 79.9 | 84.4 | 85.4 | 77.3 |
Source: World Meteorological Organization

== Education ==
In Zviahel, there are 11 secondary specialized schools (including Lyceum No. 1, No. 4, and No. 11), 4 higher education institutions, 9 libraries, 3 museums, as well as music and art schools.

Among the most well-known higher education institutions are the Medical College, founded in September 1936, as well as the Zviahel Polytechnic Applied College and the Economic-humanitarian professional college.

== Notable people ==
- Lesya Ukrainka (1871–1913), poet and writer
- Peter Krasnow (1886–1979), artist
- Sam Muchnick (1905–1998), professional wrestling promoter (National Wrestling Alliance)
- Baruch Korff (1914–1995), Jewish activist known as "Nixon's rabbi"
- Elena Yakovleva (born 1961), actress
- Oleksandr Pavliuk (born 1965), general and commander of the Ukrainian Ground Forces
- Valerii Zaluzhnyi (1973), general and Commander-in-Chief of the Armed Forces of Ukraine
- Oleksandr Kovalchuk (1974), politician
- Oleh Mikats (born 1975), general and serving as the commander of the Operational Command East
- Dmytro Kostiuk (born 1993), Ukrainian journalist and politician
- Oleh Hychko (1996–2022), soldier

== Twin towns – sister cities ==
Zviahel is twinned with:

- Bełchatów, Poland
- Dolyna, Ukraine
- Halych, Ukraine
- (Georgia (country)) Khashuri, Georgia
- Łomża, Poland
- Ludwigshafen, Germany
- Myrhorod, Ukraine
- Rahachow, Belarus
- Suomussalmi, Finland

== Gallery ==
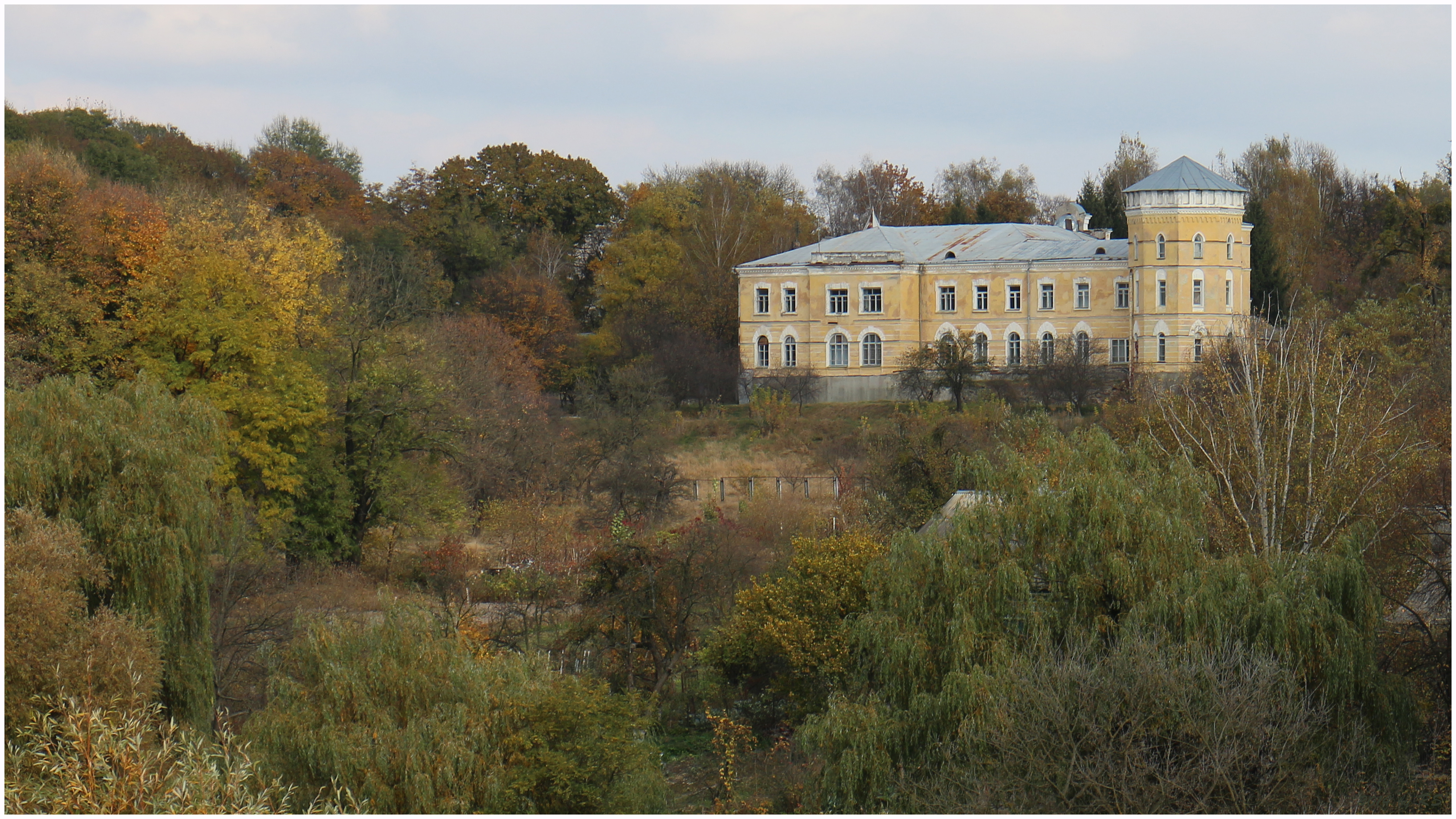
Mezentsev Palace

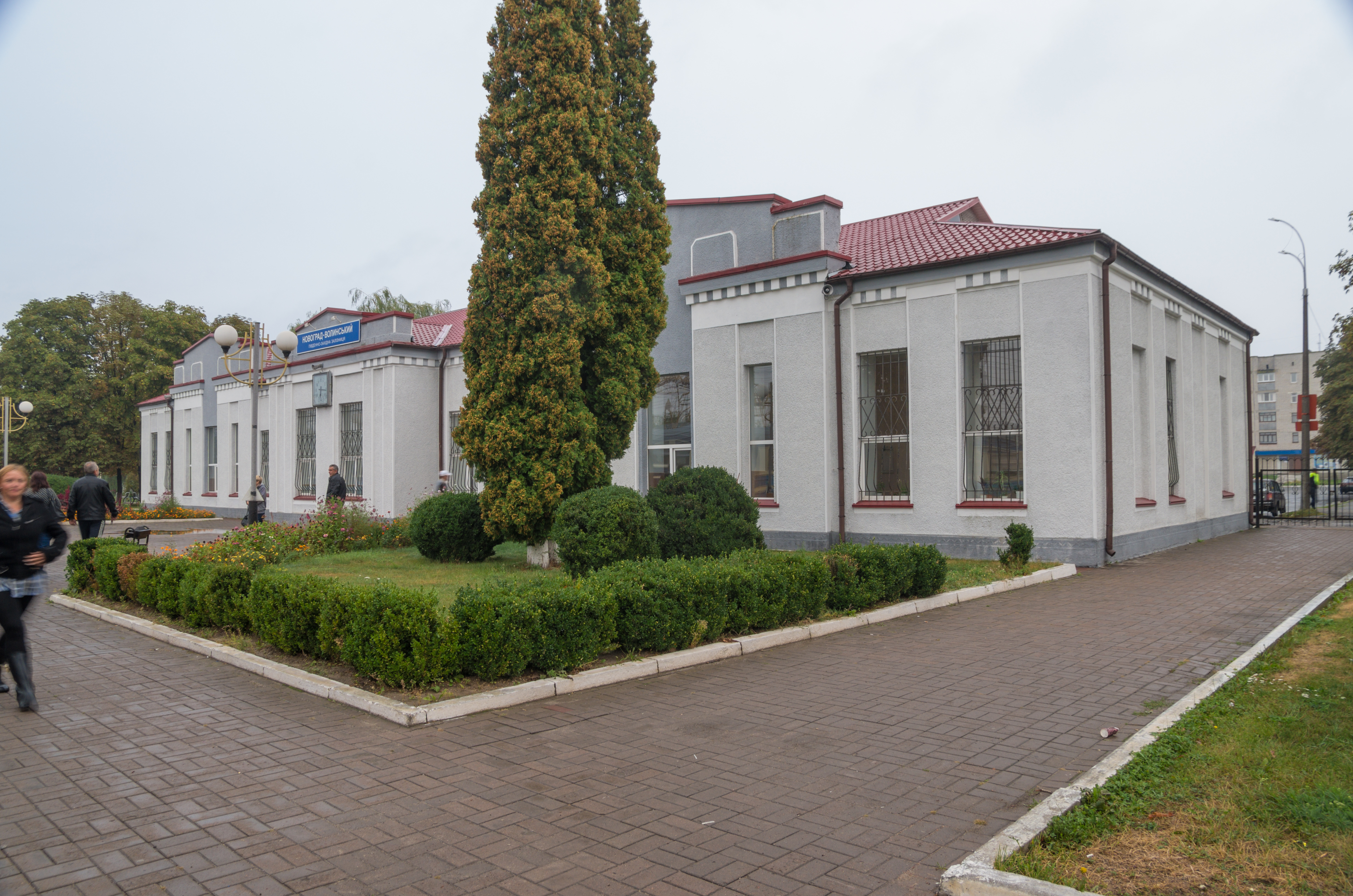
Zviahel railway station

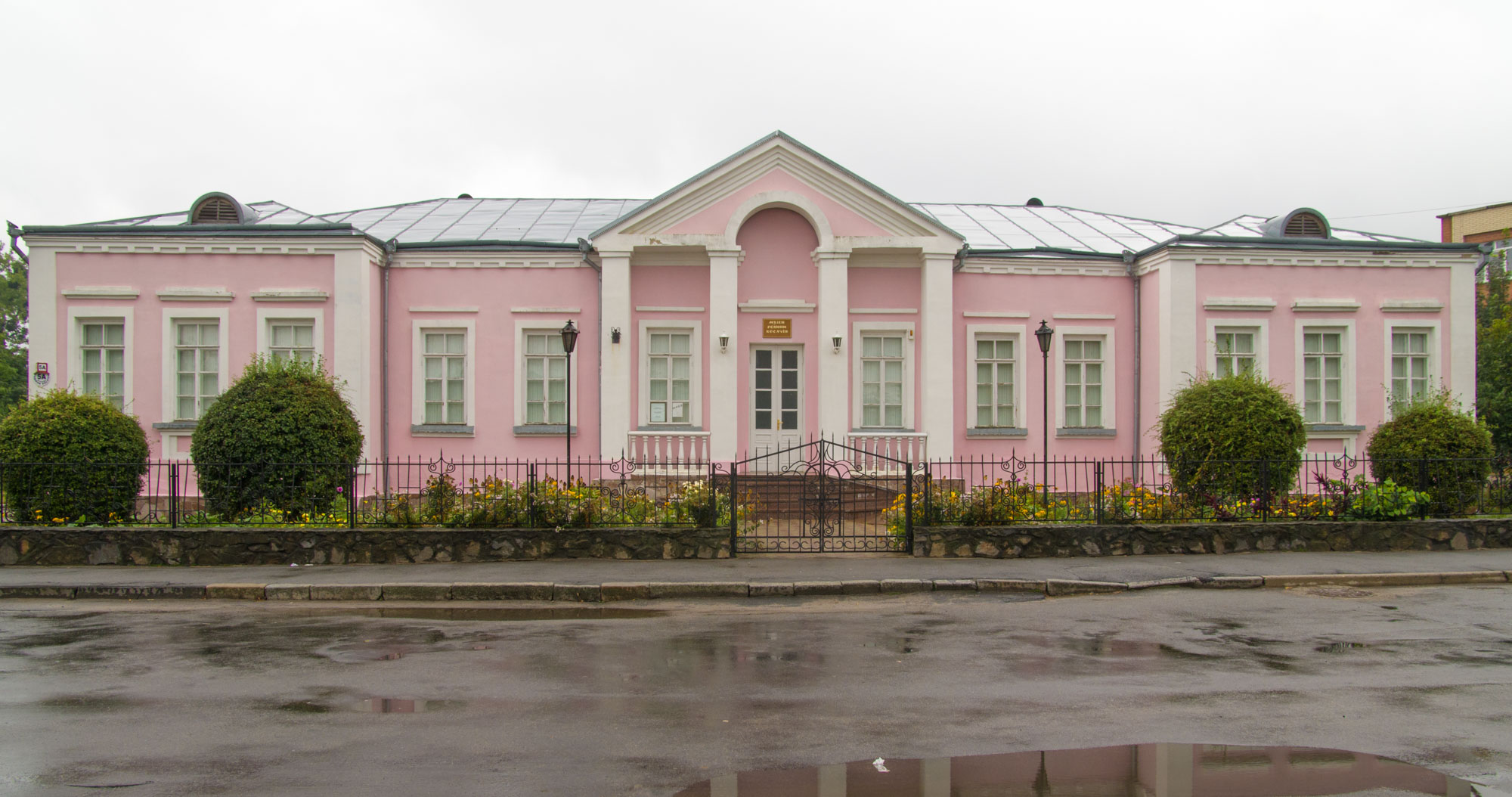
Lesya Ukrainka's House

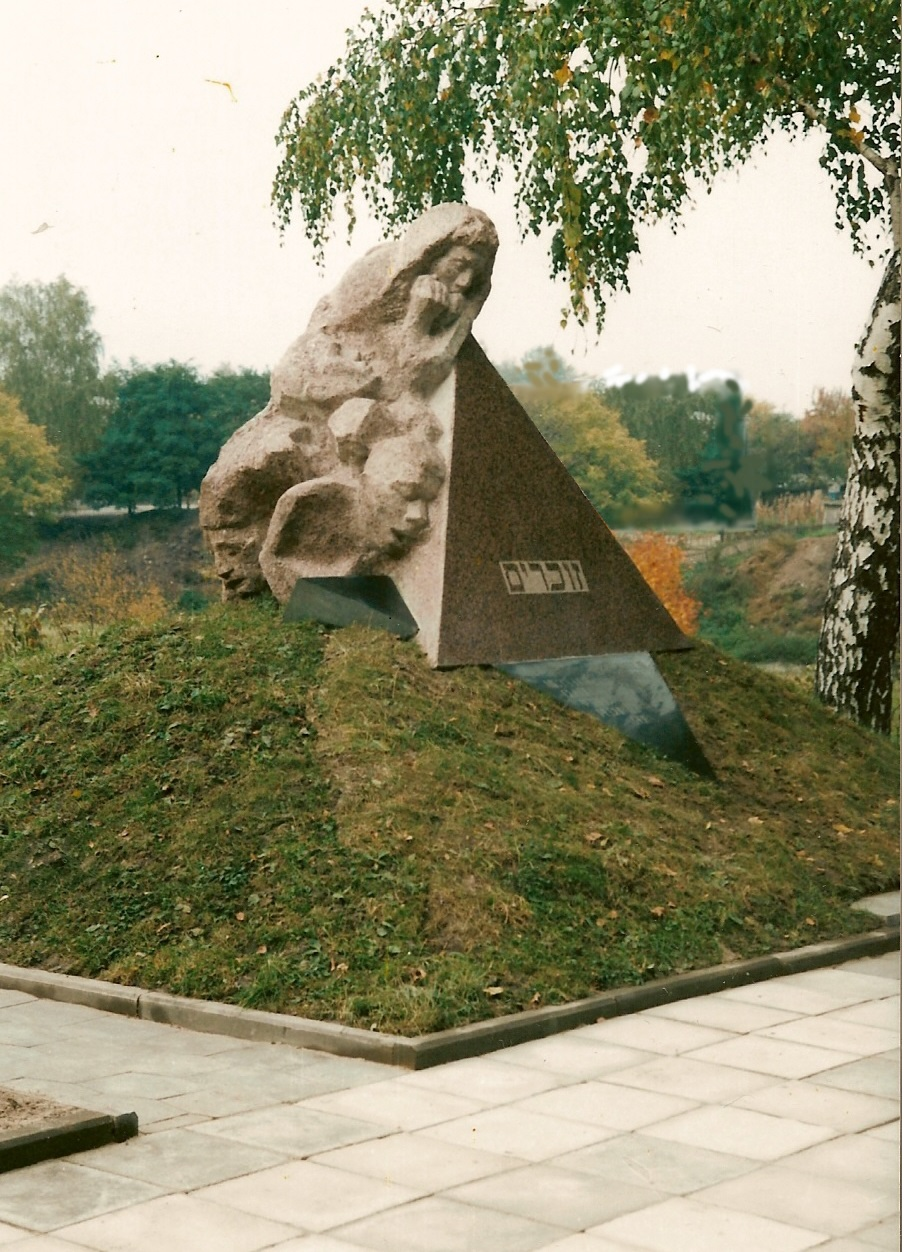
Holocaust monument

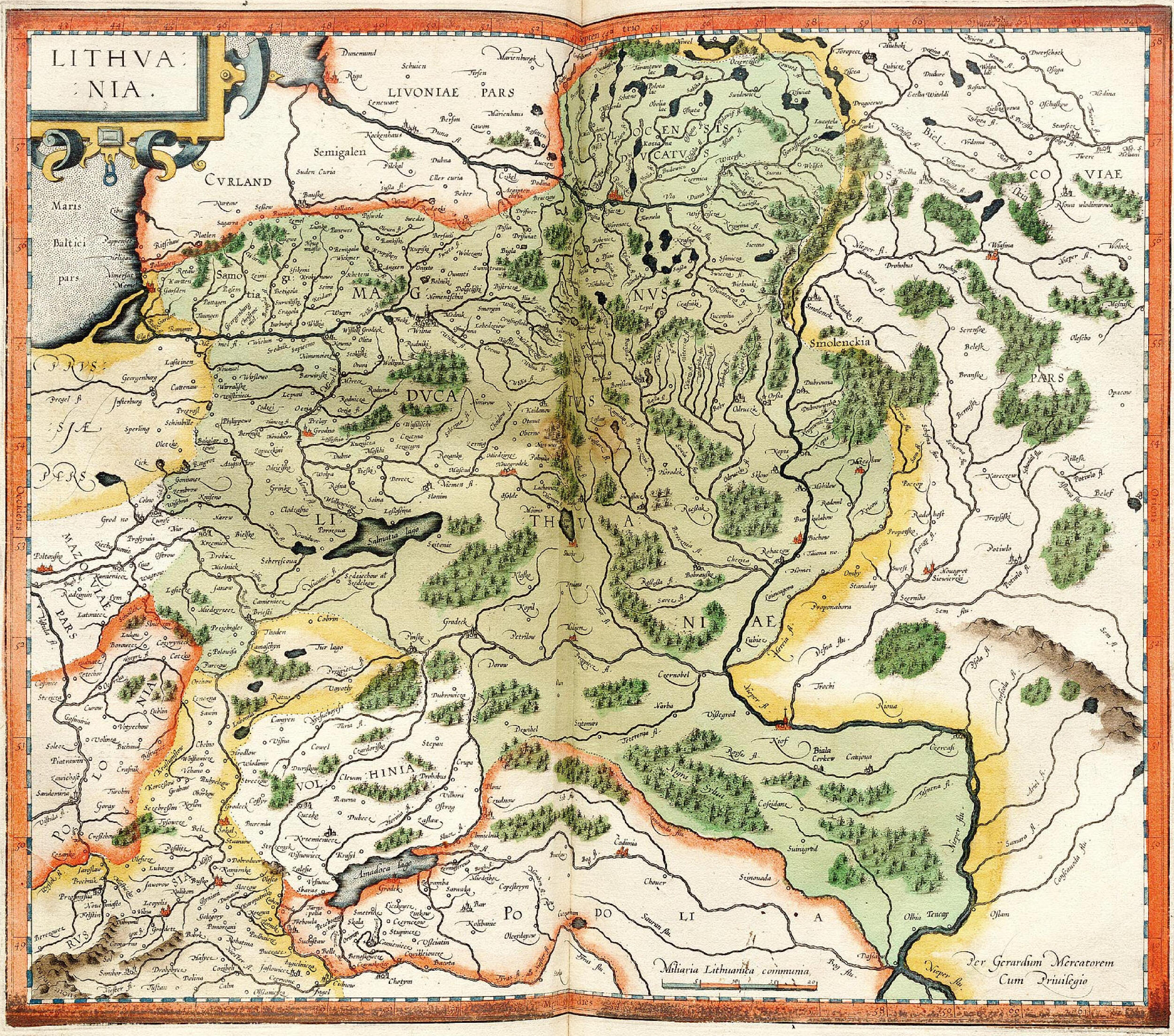
Dzwihel is between Teteriv and Sluch

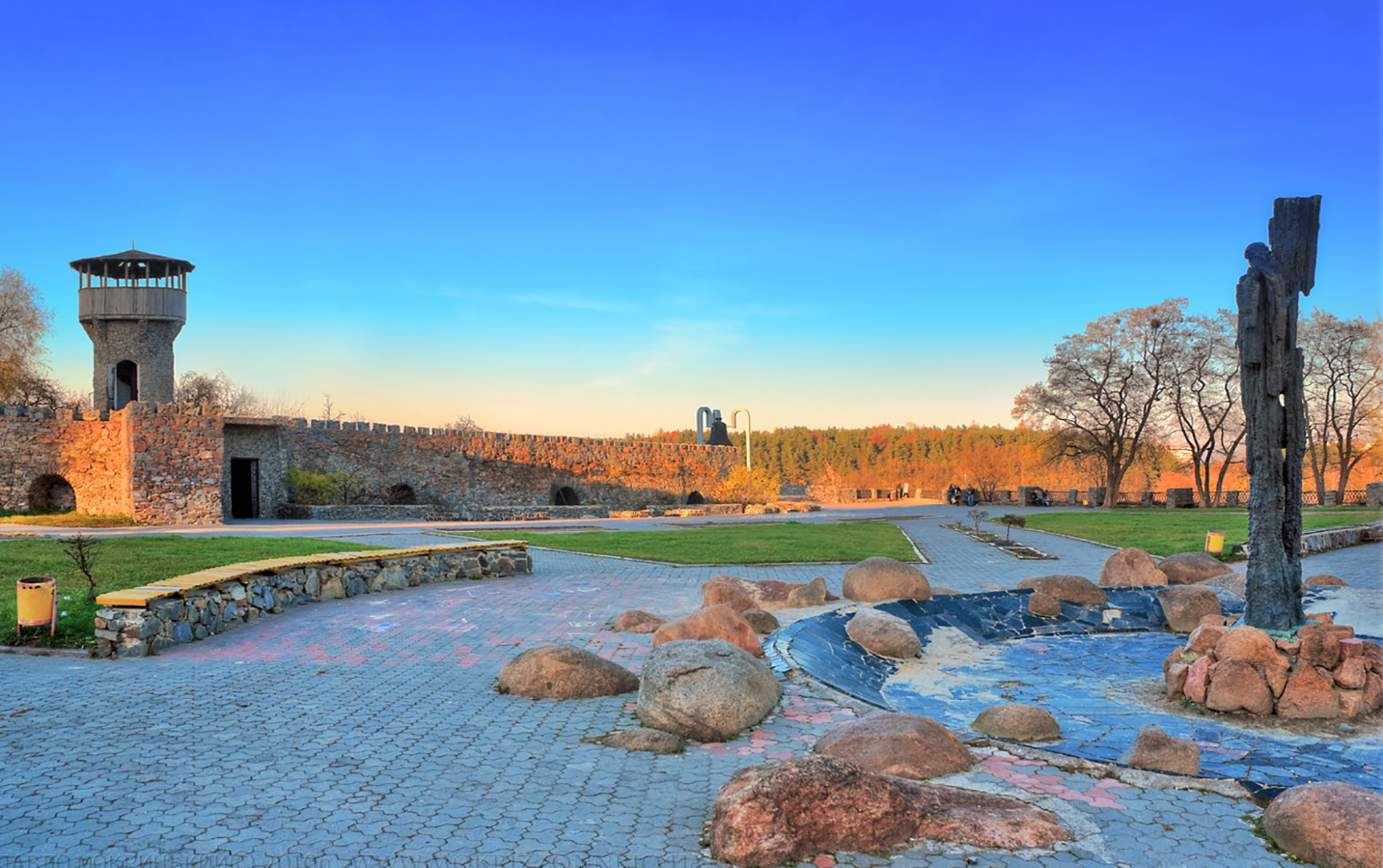
Zviahel Fortress

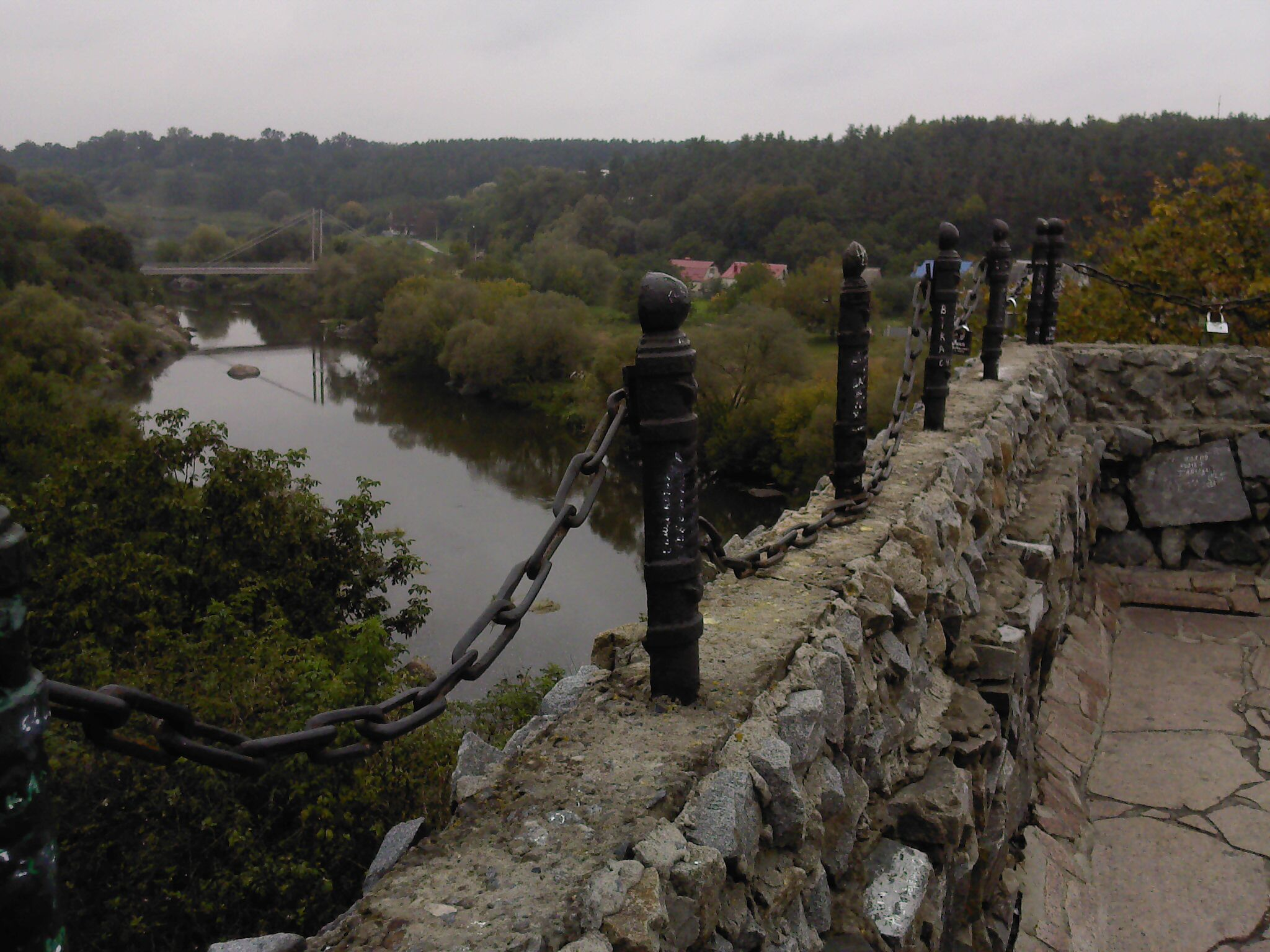
Zviahel Fortress over Sluch River

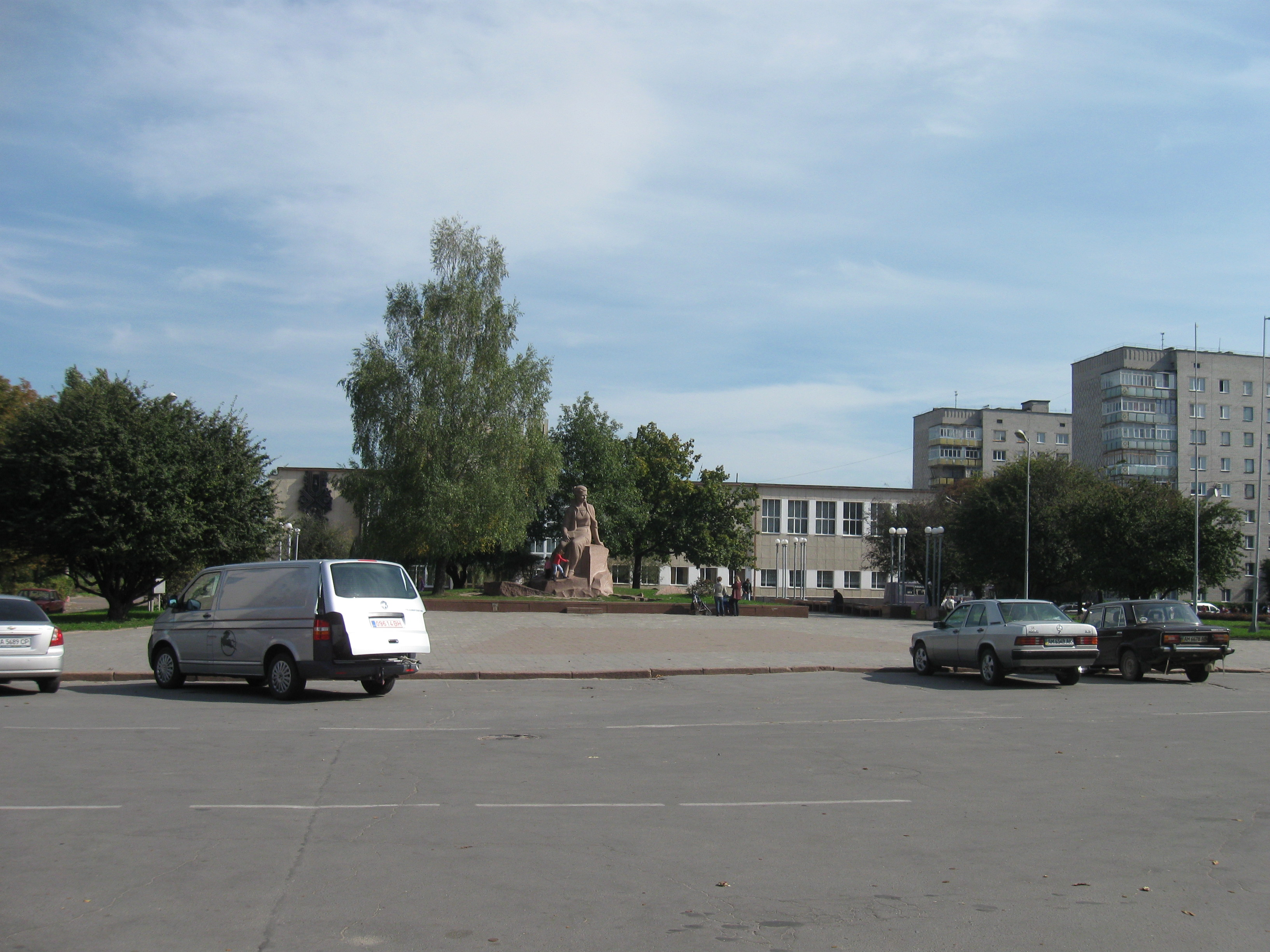
Lesya Ukrainka Square
