= Teofipol settlement hromada =

Hromada in Khmelnytskyi Oblast, Ukraine

Teofipol Теофіполь
- Hromada
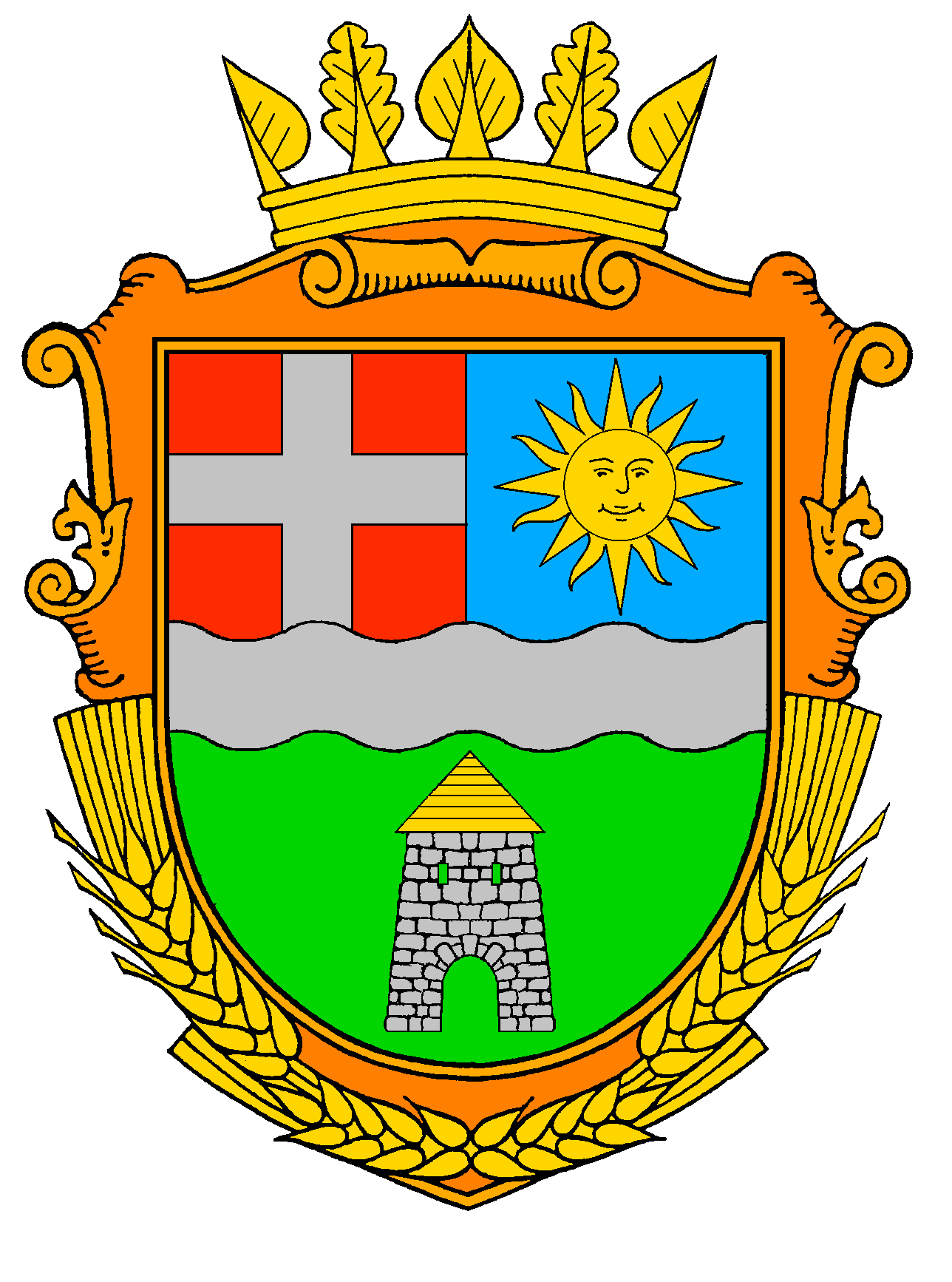
- Seal
- Interactive map of Teofipol
- Country: Ukraine
- Oblast: Khmelnytskyi Oblast
- Raion: Khmelnytskyi Raion

Area
  - Total: 716 km^{2} (276 sq mi)

Population
  - Total: 25,827
  - Density: 36.1/km^{2} (93.4/sq mi)

Teofipol settlement hromada is one of the hromadas of Khmelnytskyi Raion in Khmelnytskyi Oblast of Ukraine. Its administrative centre is the rural settlement of Teofipol.

== Creation ==
The hromada was established in its current borders in 2020 and corresponds to the territory of the former Teofipol Raion, which was abolished during the territorial reform in Ukraine.

== Composition ==
The hromada consists of two rural settlements (Teofipol and Bazaliia) and 53 villages:

- Antonivka
- Berezhyntsi
- Borshchivka
- Chervona Dubyna
- Chervone
- Chervonyi Sluch
- Chovhuziv
- Dmytrivka
- Halchyntsi
- Havrylivka
- Ilkivtsi
- Karabiivka
- Karaina
- Kolisets
- Kolky
- Korovie
- Kotiurzhyntsi
- Kryvovilka
- Kuzmyntsi
- Kuncha
- Lysohirska
- Lidykhivka
- Liutarivka
- Maidan-Petrivskyi
- Malyi Lazuchyn
- Mali Zherebky
- Marianivka
- Medysivka
- Mykhyryntsi
- Mykhnivka
- Nemyryntsi
- Novoivanivka
- Novostavtsi
- Oliinyky
- Ordyntsi
- Poliakhova
- Ridka
- Romaniv, Teofipol Raion
- Shybena
- Stroky
- Sviatets
- Troianivka
- Turivka
- Ulianove
- Valianivske
- Vasylivka
- Velykyi Lazuchyn
- Volytsia
- Volytsia-Polova
- Voronivtsi
- Vovkivtsi
- Yelyzavetpil
- Zaruddia
