= Borys Rudyi =

Ukrainian sculptor (1948–2017)

- Борис Іванович Рудий
- Born: 20 June 1948; Kryvovilka, now Khmelnytskyi Oblast, Ukraine
- Died: 6 June 2017 (aged 68); Ternopil, Ukraine
- Education: Vyzhnytsia School of Applied Arts
- Occupation: Sculptor

Borys Rudyi (Ukrainian: Борис Іванович Рудий; 20 June 1948 – 6 June 2017) was a Ukrainian sculptor. Member of National Union of Artists of Ukraine (from 1989), the art group "Khoruhva".

== Biography ==
Borys Rudy was born on 20 June 1948, in Kryvovilka (now Teofipol Hromada, Khmelnytskyi Raion, Khmelnytskyi Oblast, Ukraine).

In 1981, he graduated from the Vyzhnytsia School of Applied Arts. From 1972, he lived and worked in Ternopil.

He died on 6 June 2017, in Ternopil. He is survived by his wife, Iryna.

== Creativity ==
He worked in the fields of easel, monumental, and decorative sculpture. In his works, he used metal, stone, chamotte, and wood. From that same year, he presented his works in Ivano-Frankivsk, Dnipropetrovsk, Kyiv, Ternopil, and Chernivtsi.

In July 2018, a posthumous exhibition of the sculptor's work was held at the Gallery of the Ternopil Oblast Organization of the National Union of Artists of Ukraine. In October of the same year, the artist was posthumously honored with a solo exhibition, "Tse Moia Doroha", at the Andrey Sheptytsky National Museum in Lviv.

Among his important works:

- Sculptures: "Fleistyst" (1985), "Arkhitektor" (1986), "Dvoie" (1988), "Zvilnennia" (1992), "Bez nas" (1993), "Perekhrestia" (1995), "Karpaty" (2005).
- Memorial complex Molotkiv Tragedy in Molotkiv, Kremenets Raion (1985, co-author).
- Monuments: to the brothers Mykhailo and Tymofii Boichuk's in Romanivka, Ternopil Raion (1992, bronze); to Danylo Halytskyi in Ternopil (2002, chased copper, architect Oleksandr Mishchuk).
- Cross of Sorrow on Lysonia Hill (Ternopil Raion), a stone cross near the Cathedral of the Immaculate Conception of the Blessed Virgin Mary in Ternopil, and a stone composition "Mezha" (1989).
- He was the author of the iconostases and frescoes for over 20 churches.

Some of his works are preserved in the collections of Ukrainian museums.

== Awards ==
- Mykhailo Boichuk Prize (1990).

== Bibliography ==
- (in Ukrainian) Дуда І., Рудий Борис Іванович // Ternopil Encyclopedic Dictionary: in 4 v. / editorial board: H. Yavorskyi and other, Ternopil: "Zbruch", 2008, V. 3: П—Я, S. 203. — ISBN 978-966-528-279-2.
- Рудий Борис Іванович // Мистці Тернопільщини. Частина 1. Образотворче мистецтво: бібліографічний покажчик / департамент культури, релігій та національностей Тернопільської облдержадміністарації, Тернопільська обласна університецька наукова бібліотека; укладач Миськів В.; вступна стаття І. Дуда; керівник проєкту та науковий редактор Вітенко В.; редактор Жовтко Г. — Тернопіль : Підручники і посібники, 2015. — С. 376—377. — ISBN 978-966-07-2936-0.
- Борис Рудий [Текст]: [каталог] / Б. Рудий. — [Б. м. : б. в.], 201[?]. — 77 с. : фот. — [Світлій пам'яті скульптора Б. Рудого лауреата премії ім. М. Бойчука].
- Герета І. Сила і ніжність // Свобода. — 1998. — 20 черв. — С. 3. — (Ювілеї).
- Герета І. І сила, і ніжність // Наукові записки / Тернопільський обласний краєзнавчий музей. — Т., 2003. — Вип. 3. — С. 148—154. — (Мистецтво).
- Герета І. Сила і ніжність // Тернопілля'98—99 : реґіон. річник. — Т., 2002. — С. 544—547. — (Під мистецькі знамена).
- Данилюк Х. Самотній чоловік з клеймом «оригінала» // Західна Україна. — 1994. — 29 трав. — 4 черв.
- Дуда І. Борис Рудий // Тернопіль. — 1994. — № 2/3 : Художники Тернопільщини. — С. 79.
- Дуда І. Чотири кроки до вічності // Артес. — 2016. — 12 лип.
- Мороко-Довгалюк Х. Реальність загадкового // Вільне життя. — 1998. — 7 лип. — С. 4. — (Нотатки з виставки скульптур Бориса Рудого).
- День за днем — у скарбницю духовності // Літературний Тернопіль. — 2017. — № 4. — С. 151—163. — (Тернопілля у дзеркалі часу: події, факти, імена).
- Попович Ж. Захід Рудого сонця // Номер один. — 2017. — 14 черв. — С. 15.
