= Bolokhovians =

Uncertain 13th-century ethnic group

The Bolokhovians, Bolokhoveni or Bolokhovens (Romanian: Bolohoveni; Old Slavic: Болоховци, Bolokhovtsy) were a 13th-century ethnic group that resided in the vicinity of the principalities of Galicia, Volhynia and Kiev, in the territory known as the "Bolokhovian Land" centered at the city of Bolokhov or Bolokhovo (not identified yet). Their ethnic identity is uncertain. Archaeological evidence and the Hypatian Chronicle (which is the only primary source that documents their history) suggest that they were a Slavic people. Romanian scholars, basing on an interpretation of the ethnonym, identify them as Romanians (who were called Vlachs in the Middle Ages). Their princes, or knyazes, were in constant conflict with Daniel, the prince of Galicia–Volhynia, between 1231 and 1257. After the Mongols sacked Kiev in 1240, the Bolokhovians supplied them with troops, but the Bolokhovian princes fled to Poland. The Bolokhovians disappeared after Daniel defeated them in 1257.

== Etymology ==
The ethnonym seems to be connected to the place name "Bolokhovo" the Hypatian Codex – a source on the history of Kievan Rus' – mentioned around 1150. According to historian Victor Spinei, this town may have been the same town as Borokhov, which was recorded by the same chronicle in 1172. Alternatively, Spinei suggests, Bolokhovo may be the same town as Bolechow (now Bolekhiv, Ukraine), which was mentioned as the "town called 'the Vlachs'" in a Polish charter from 1472.

The historian Victor Spinei suggests that the name "Bolokhoveni" may have derived from Voloch, the East Slavic term for Romanians, or Vlachs. If this theory is correct, the Bolokhoveni were Romanians living in the western regions of Kievan Rus'. However the theory is contradicted by archaeological evidence, which indicates that the Bolokhovian material culture resembled that of its contemporaries in the western parts of Kievan Rus'. Furthermore, it is documented that the Bolokhovian princes had family ties with boyars of the Principality of Galicia.

== Bolokhovian Land ==
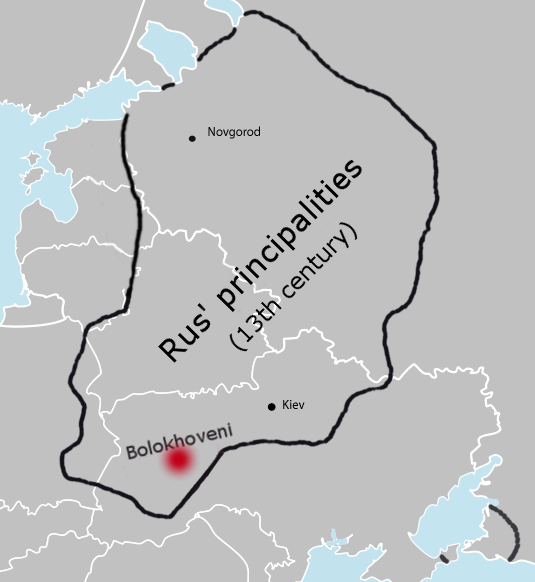
Opposing to Boldur's view, Martin Dimnik identifies the Bolokhovian Land as a small region to the north of the uppermost course of the river Bug.

The Hypatian Codex refers to the "Bolokhovian Land" once. Based on the chronicle, modern historians say that this land bordered the principalities of Galicia, Volhynia and Kiev. Bozhskyy, along with other Bolokhovian towns mentioned in the chronicle, were situated along the Buzhok and Sluch rivers. According to the Encyclopedia of the History Ukraine, the Bolokhovian Land occupied the region south of the river Khomora, a left tributary of Sluch around the upper reaches of Sluch with its tributaries, as well as parts of the Boh river basin. On the other hand, historian Alexandru Boldur believes that the Bolokhovian Land was located between the Dniester and Dnieper rivers. He also says that the Bolokhoveni were located southeast of the present-day town of Ushitsa (Romanian: Ușița).

== History ==
The Hypatian Chronicle first refers to "Bolokhovian princes" when documenting a war between Daniel Romanovich, the prince of Galicia–Volhynia, and the Hungarians in 1231. The Bolokhovian princes fought in alliance with the Hungarians. They supported a rebellion against Daniel Romanovich, and they besieged an important stronghold, Kamianets-Podilskyi, in 1233 or 1235 and also in 1236. (Note: See War of the Galician Succession (1205–1245)) However, the princes were captured and brought to the court of Daniel Romanovich in Vladimir. When Mikhail, the prince of Chernigov, and Iziaslav, the prince of Novgorod-Seversk, requested their release, they referred to Bolokhovian princes as their "brothers".

After the Mongols destroyed Kiev in 1240, the Mongols moving westward did not attack the "Bolokhovian Land". However, they did force the Bolokhovians to supply their army with crops. At the same time, the Bolokhovian princes fled to the Duchy of Masovia (now in Poland). They promised Duke Bolesław I of Masovia that they would accept his suzerainty, but the duke captured them. They were released after Daniil Romanovich and his brother, Vasylko Romanovich, promised to give Duke Bolesław I many gifts.

The Mongol invasion of Kievan Rus' did not end the conflicts among the local rulers. The Bolokhovian princes supported Rostislav Mikhailovich when he besieged Bakota, a major town held by Daniel Romanovich's officials, in 1241. In revenge for the attack, Daniel Romanovich invaded and pillaged the Bolokhovian Land and destroyed their fortified towns. Archaeological research at Gubin and Kudin, two supposedly Bolokhovian towns, shows that the town walls were dug up by Daniil's army. However, no corpses or traces of fire were found, implying that Daniel took the towns' inhabitants to his own principality. Their defeat by Daniel's troops in 1257 was the last recorded event of the history of the Bolokhovians.

== See also ==
- Blakumen

== Sources ==
- Boldur, Alexandru V. (1992). Istoria Basarabiei [History of Bessarabia] (in Romanian). Editura V. Frunza. ISBN 978-5-85886-027-3.
- Dimnik, Martin (1981). Mikhail, Prince of Chernigov and Grand Prince of Kiev, 1224–1246. Pontifical Institute of Mediaeval Studies. ISBN 0-88844-052-9.
- Spinei, Victor (1986). Moldavia in the 11th–14th Centuries. Editura Academiei Republicii Socialiste Româna.
- Spinei, Victor (2009). The Romanians and the Turkic Nomads North of the Danube Delta from the Tenth to the Mid-Thirteenth century. Koninklijke Brill NV. ISBN 978-90-04-17536-5.
