= Bolokhov =

Unidentified city

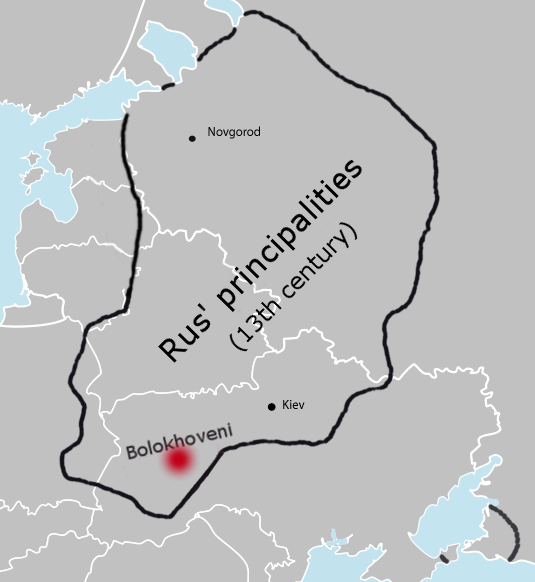
The Bolokhovian Land as identified by Martin Dimnik: a small region to the north of the uppermost course of the Southern Bug river.

Bolokhov (Note: Church Slavonic: Болохов; Polish: Bołochów; Romanian: Bolohov; Russian: Болохов; Ukrainian: Болохов.) was a city mentioned in the Kievan and Galician–Volhynian chronicles, which gave the name to the Bolokhovian Land, but that has not yet been found or identified. The currently known chronicle texts, like other historical sources, do not allow to determine the location of the city of Bolokhov with acceptable, sufficient archaeological accuracy. M. Dimnik claims that this land may have been located in the southwest corner of the Principality of Kiev and that it also shared borders with Volhynia and Galicia. According to Andrey Kuza, Bolokhov was located in modern-day Liubar.

== Mentions in chronicles ==
According to historians, Bolokhov was located in the upper reaches of the Southern Bug, in the basins of the Horyn River with the Sluch tributary and the Teteriv River. This follows the mention of it in the Galician-Volhynian Chronicle of the 13th century. The very first mention is associated with the year 1150, when Vladimirko Volodarovich, the prince of Galicia, went from Galicia to Kiev through Bolokhov. The second reference dates back to 1170, when Mstislav II, through Bolokhov, fled from Kiev to Volodymyr. The third reference is in 1231, the fourth, about the attack of Daniel of Galicia, in 1241, and finally the last in 1257. The Bolokhovs were allied with Rostislav Mikhailovich and they saw action when the latter besieged Bakota. An account described the capture of the princes of Bolokhov by Vladimirko after the attack on Daniel's lands.

The city of Bolokhov is also mentioned in the Kievan Chronicle. It tells about the 1150 war for the throne of the grand prince of Kiev between Iziaslav II of Kiev and his uncle Yuri Dolgorukiy.

== See also ==
- Bolokhovians
