= Pavlo Khudzik =

Ukrainian footballer

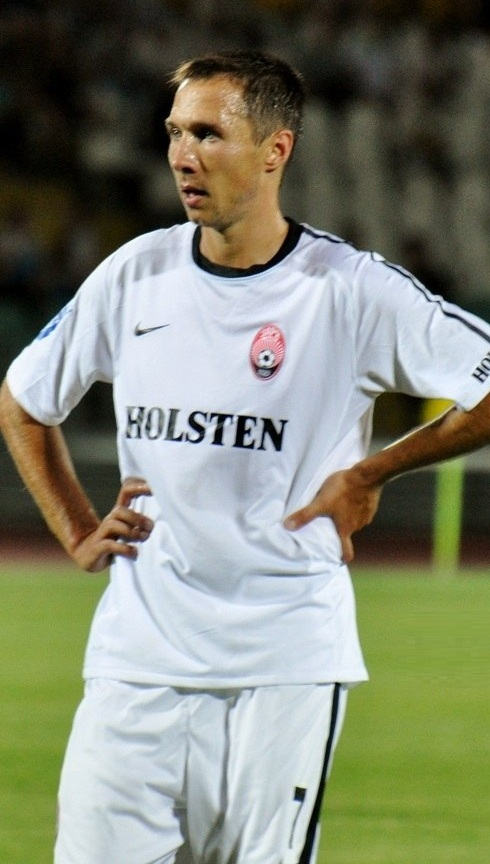

Personal information
- Full name: Pavlo Oleksandrovych Khudzik
- Date of birth: 29 April 1985
- Place of birth: Teofipol, Ukrainian SSR
- Date of death: 8 March 2015 (aged 29)
- Place of death: Zolotonosha, Ukraine
- Height: 1.79 m (5 ft 10 in)
- Position: Forward

Senior career*
Years	Team	Apps	(Gls)
2002–2003	Krasyliv	9	(0)
2003–2004	Krasyliv-Obolon Krasyliv	18	(0)
2004–2006	Enerhetyk Burshtyn	64	(9)
2007–2010	Lviv	30	(5)
2007	→ Knyazha Shchaslyve (loan)	15	(10)
2010–2011	Obolon Kyiv	26	(4)
2011–2015	Zorya Luhansk	42	(5)
Total		204	(33)
- * Club domestic league appearances and goals

Pavlo Oleksandrovych Khudzik (Ukrainian: Павло Олександрович Худзік; 29 April 1985 – 8 March 2015) was a Ukrainian professional footballer who played as a striker.

== Career ==
In 2002 he made is his debut for FC Krasyliv. In 2004, he signed a contract with FC Enerhetyk Burshtyn, and played one season with the club. The same year, he then started playing for FC Lviv.

== Death ==
He died in a Ukrainian hospital on 8 March, 2015, after a traffic accident.
