= Oleh Hychko =

Ukrainian soldier (1996–2022)

- Олег Гичко
- Born: Oleh Serhiiovych Hychko; 10 April 1996; Novohrad-Volynskyi, now Zviahel, Zhytomyr Oblast
- Died: 17 September 2022 (aged 26) near Bila Hora, Donetsk Oblast
- Alma mater: Hetman Petro Sahaidachnyi National Army Academy
- Military career
- Allegiance: Ukraine
- Branch: Armed Forces of Ukraine
- Rank: Major
- Nickname: Наглий (Nahlyi)
- Unit: 30th Mechanized Brigade
- Conflicts: Russo-Ukrainian War
- Awards: Order of Bohdan Khmelnytskyi

Oleh Serhiiovych Hychko (Ukrainian: Олег Сергійович Гичко; 10 April 1996 – 17 September 2022) was a Ukrainian soldier, Major of the 30th Mechanized Brigade of the Armed Forces of Ukraine, a participant in the Russian-Ukrainian war.

== Biograph ==
Oleh Hychko was born on 10 April 1996 in Novohrad-Volynskyi (now Zvyagel) in a family of military soldiers.

Hychko studied at Zvyaрel Lyceum No. 4. He graduated from the Hetman Petro Sahaidachnyi National Army Academy.

Hychko served in the 30th Mechanized Brigade. In March 2017, he went to the east of Ukraine, where he proved his professionalism in artillery competitions in a few months. At that time, Junior Lieutenant Hychko was awarded the title of the best fire platoon commander. For this, the Chief of the General Staff of the Armed Forces of Ukraine awarded Oleh with the honorary badge "For Achievements in Military Service" of the 2nd class.

During the full-scale Russian invasion, Captain Oleh Hychko's artillery battery took part in the battles near Bakhmut, later liberated Izium and returned to its old positions in eastern Ukraine. He died on 17 September 2022 near the village of Bila Hora in Donetsk Oblast.

He was buried in his hometown.

== Awards ==
- Order of Bohdan Khmelnytsky, 2nd (19 June 2023, posthumously) and 3rd (19 July 2022) class
- Defender of the Motherland Medal (28 March 2022)
- President's Award for Anti-Terrorist Operation Service
- Military Achievement Medal, 2nd class
- badge "Ukrainian Ground Forces" (2018)
- honorary citizen of Zvyahel
- For Merit to the Zvyahel Raion (2023, posthumously)

== Military ranks ==
- Major
- Captain (2022)
- Senior lieutenant
- Junior lieutenant
