= Teofipol =

Rural locality in Khmelnytskyi Oblast, Ukraine

Teofipol Теофіполь
- Rural settlement
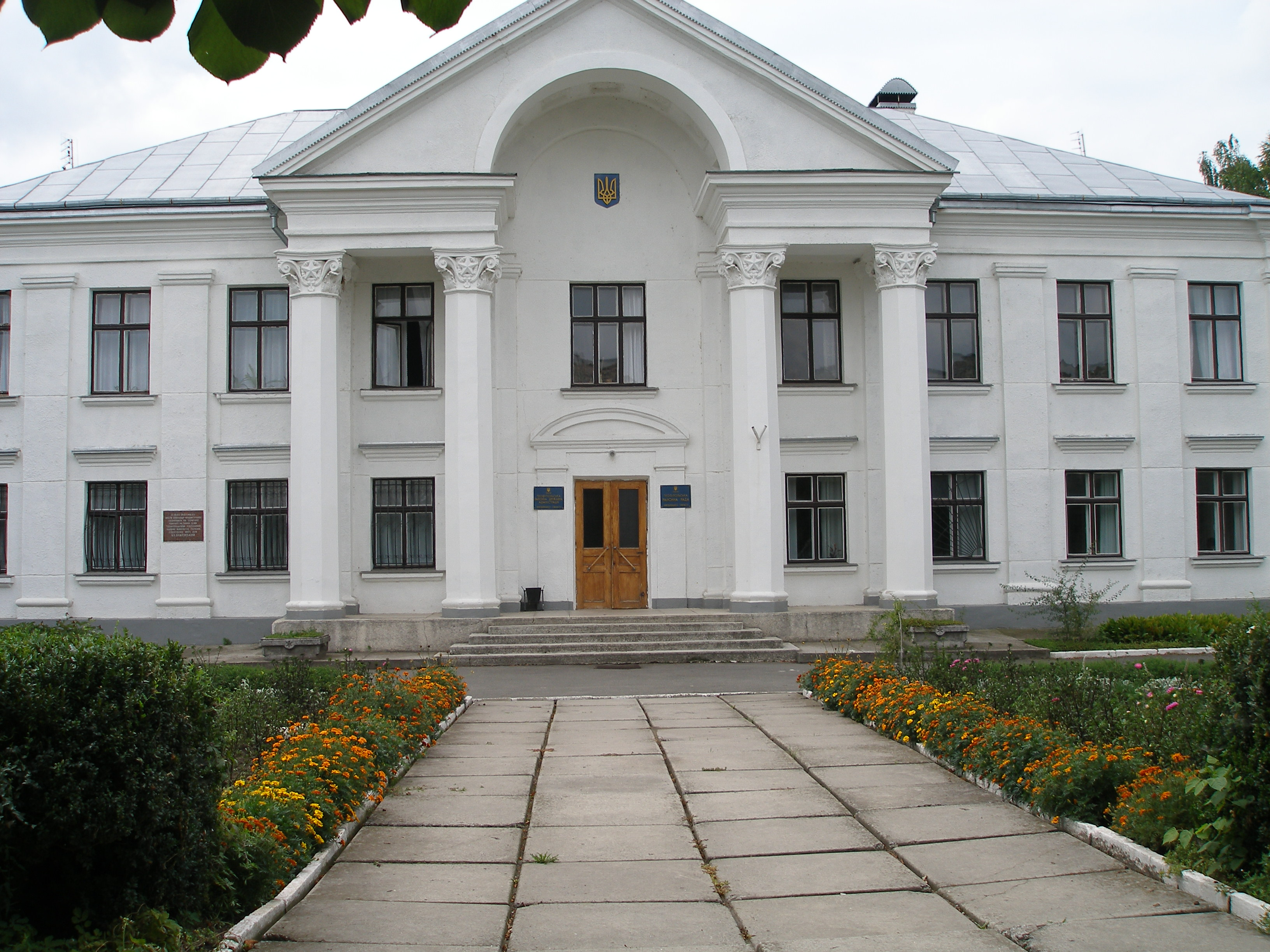
- City Hall

- Coat of arms

- Location of Teofipol in Khmelnytskyi Oblast Teofipol (Ukraine)
- Coordinates: 49°50′31″N 26°24′43″E
- Country: Ukraine
- Oblast: Khmelnytskyi Oblast
- Raion: Khmelnytskyi Raion
- Hromada: Teofipol settlement hromada
- Founded: 1420
- Town status: 1959

Government
  - Town Head: Serhiy Melnyk

Area
  - Total: 4.63 km^{2} (1.79 sq mi)
- Elevation: 268 m (879 ft)

Population (2022)
  - Total: 6,284 ▼
  - Density: 1,360/km^{2} (3,520/sq mi)
- Time zone: UTC+2 (EET)
  - Summer (DST): UTC+3 (EEST)
- Postal code: 30600—30608
- Area code: +380 3844
- Website: http://rada.gov.ua/

Teofipol (Ukrainian: Теофіполь) is a rural settlement in Khmelnytskyi Raion, Khmelnytskyi Oblast, western Ukraine. It hosts the administration of Teofipol settlement hromada, one of the hromadas of Ukraine. The settlement's population was 7,026 at the 2001 Ukrainian Census. Current population: 6,284 (2022 estimate).

== History ==
Until 18 July 2020, Teofipol was the administrative center of Teofipol Raion. The raion was abolished in July 2020 as part of the administrative reform of Ukraine, which reduced the number of raions of Khmelnytskyi Oblast to three. The area of Teofipol Raion was merged into Khmelnytskyi Raion.

Until 26 January 2024, Teofipol was designated urban-type settlement. On this day, a new law entered into force which abolished this status, and Teofipol became a rural settlement.

== Notable people ==
- Pavlo Khudzik, football striker for FC Zorya Luhansk
- Serhiy Shevchuk, football striker for FC Dynamo-2 Kyiv
- Art Shryer (born 1883), American klezmer musician
