= Serhiy Shevchuk (footballer, born 1990) =

Ukrainian footballer

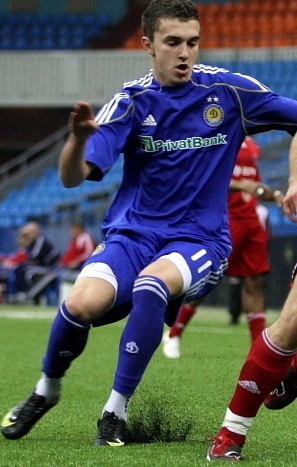

Personal information
- Full name: Serhiy Anatoliyovych Shevchuk
- Date of birth: 21 September 1990 (age 36)
- Place of birth: Teofipol, Khmelnytskyi Oblast, Ukrainian SSR
- Height: 1.75 m (5 ft 9 in)
- Position: Winger

Youth career
- 2003–2004: Sport School Ternopil
- 2005–2007: Dynamo Kyiv
- 2007: RVUFK Kyiv

Senior career*
Years	Team	Apps	(Gls)
2007–2013	Dynamo Kyiv	0	(0)
2007–2013	→ Dynamo-2 Kyiv	76	(9)
2007–2008	→ Dynamo-3 Kyiv	12	(1)
2013–2014	Volyn Lutsk	0	(0)
2014	Banga Gargždai	30	(5)
2015	Šiauliai	12	(2)
2015	Trakai	9	(2)
2016	Vitebsk	16	(0)
2017	Liepāja	6	(0)
2018	Ahrobiznes Volochysk	15	(1)
2019–2021	Chaika Petropavlivska Borshchahivka	42	(3)
2021–2023	Druzhba Myrivka (amateur)		

International career
2006	Ukraine U16	10	(5)
2006–2007	Ukraine U17	18	(11)
2007–2009	Ukraine U18	15	(4)
2008–2009	Ukraine U19	12	(0)
Medal record
Men's football
Representing Ukraine
UEFA European Under-19 Championship
Winner	2009 Ukraine
- * Club domestic league appearances and goals as of 10 July 2021

Serhiy Shevchuk (Ukrainian: Сергій Анатолійович Шевчук, born 21 September 1990) is a Ukrainian professional football winger.

== Honours ==
- 2009 UEFA European Under-19 Football Championship: Champion
- 2017 Latvian Football Cup: Winner
