= Teofipol Raion =

Former subdivision of Khmelnytskyi Oblast, Ukraine

Teofipol Raion Теофіпольський район
- Raion
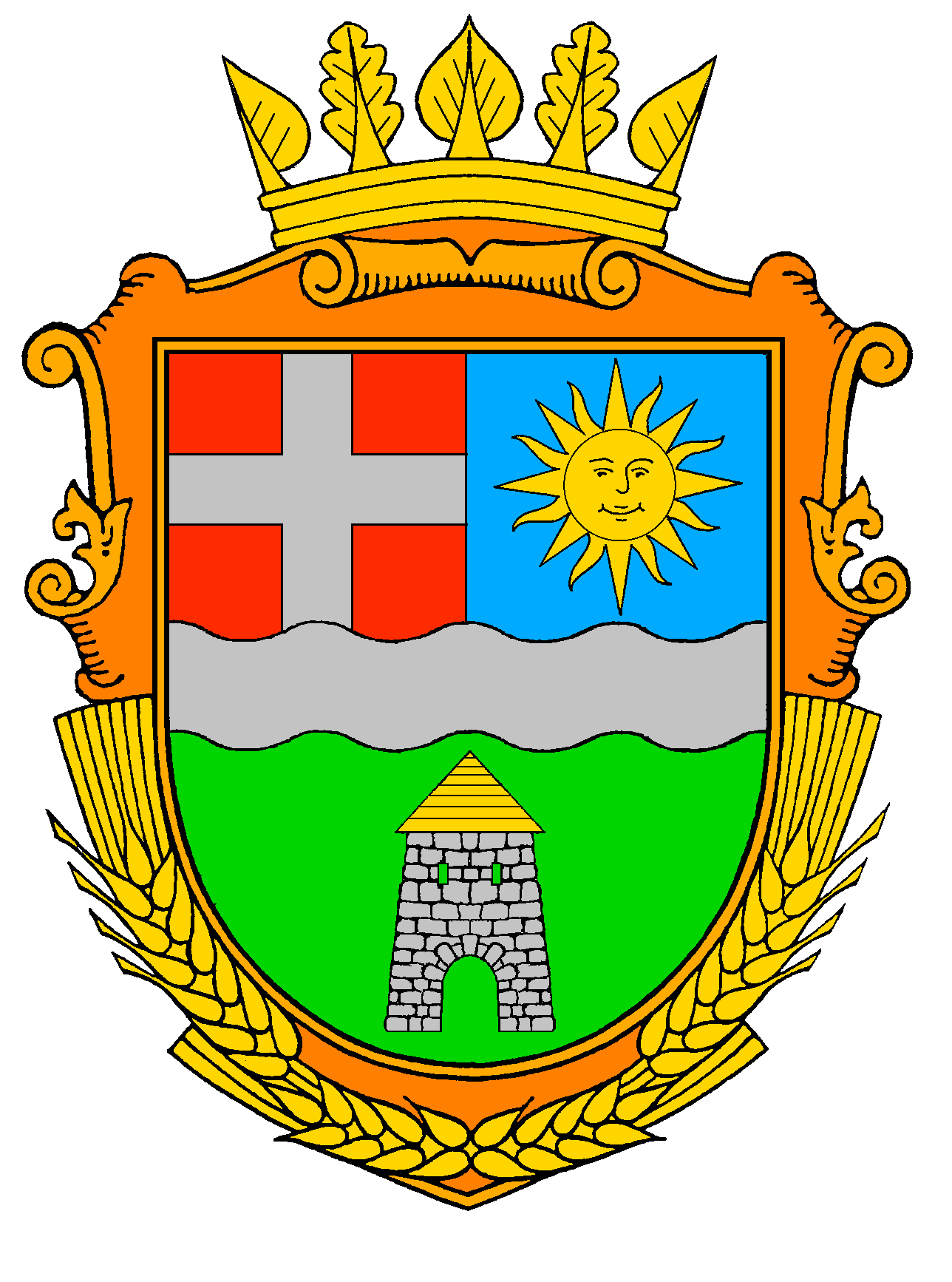
- Flag Coat of arms

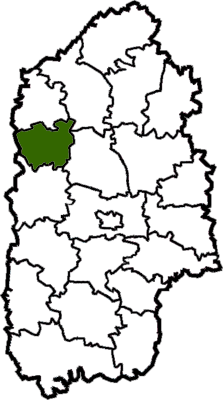
- Coordinates: 49°50′31″N 26°24′43″E
- Country: Ukraine
- Region: Khmelnytskyi Oblast
- Established: 7 March 1923
- Disestablished: 18 July 2020
- Admin. center: Teofipol
- Subdivisions: List: 0 — city councils; 2 — settlement councils; 22 — rural councils; Number of localities: 0 — cities; 2 — urban-type settlements; 53 — villages; 0 — rural settlements

Government
  - Governor: Viktor Lebedynskyi

Area
  - Total: 716 km^{2} (276 sq mi)

Population (2020)
  - Total: 25,353 ▼
  - Density: 35.4/km^{2} (91.7/sq mi)
- Time zone: UTC+02:00 (EET)
  - Summer (DST): UTC+03:00 (EEST)
- Postal index: 30600—30651
- Area code: +380 3844
- Website: http://rda.tf.km.ua

Teofipol Raion (Ukrainian: Теофіпольський район, Teofipol's'kyi raion) was one of the 20 administrative raions (a district) of Khmelnytskyi Oblast in western Ukraine. Its administrative center was located in the urban-type settlement of Teofipol. Its population was 32,247 as of the 2001 Ukrainian Census. The raion was abolished on 18 July 2020 as part of the administrative reform of Ukraine, which reduced the number of raions of Khmelnytskyi Oblast to three. The area of Teofipol Raion was merged into Khmelnytskyi Raion. The last estimate of the raion population was 25,353 (2020 est.)

== Geography ==
Teofipol Raion was located in the western part of Khmelnytskyi Oblast, corresponding to the modern-day boundaries of the Volhynia and Podolia historical regions. Its total area constituted 716 square kilometres (276 mi^{2}). To its east, it bordered upon Lanivtsi Raion of Ternopil Oblast. The Sluch River's origin began in the vicinity of Teofipol Raion.

== History ==
Teofipol Raion was first established on 7 March 1923 as part of a full-scale administrative reorganization of the Ukrainian Soviet Socialist Republic.

In February 1930, the raion was the centre of a quickly defeated anti-Soviet Union revolt.

On 23 February 1959, the raion was renamed to Manuilskyi Raion (Ukrainian: Мануїльський район) in honor of Dmitry Manuilsky, a prominent Ukrainian Soviet politician and leader of the Ukrainian Communist Party.

Manuilskyi Raion existed up until it was dissolved in 1962. After it was dissolved, its territory was at first annexed by neighboring Volochysk and Iziaslav Raions and later by Bilohiria Raion. A decree of the Presidium of the Supreme Soviet dated December 8, 1966 again re-established Teofipol Raion.

== Subdivisions ==
At the time of disestablishment, the raion consisted of one hromadas, Teofipol settlement hromada with the administration in Teofipol.

Teofipol Raion was divided in a way that followed the general administrative scheme in Ukraine. Local government was also organized along a similar scheme nationwide. Consequently, raions were subdivided into councils, which were the prime level of administrative division in the country.

Each of the raion's urban localities administered their own councils, often containing a few other villages within its jurisdiction. However, only a handful of rural localities were organized into councils, which also might contain a few villages within its jurisdiction.

Accordingly, the Teofipol Raion was divided into:

- 2 settlement councils—made up of the urban-type settlements of Teofipol (administrative center) and Bazaliia
- 22 village councils

Overall, the raion had a total of 55 populated localities, consisting of two urban-type settlements, and 53 villages.
