= Sluch (Ukraine) =

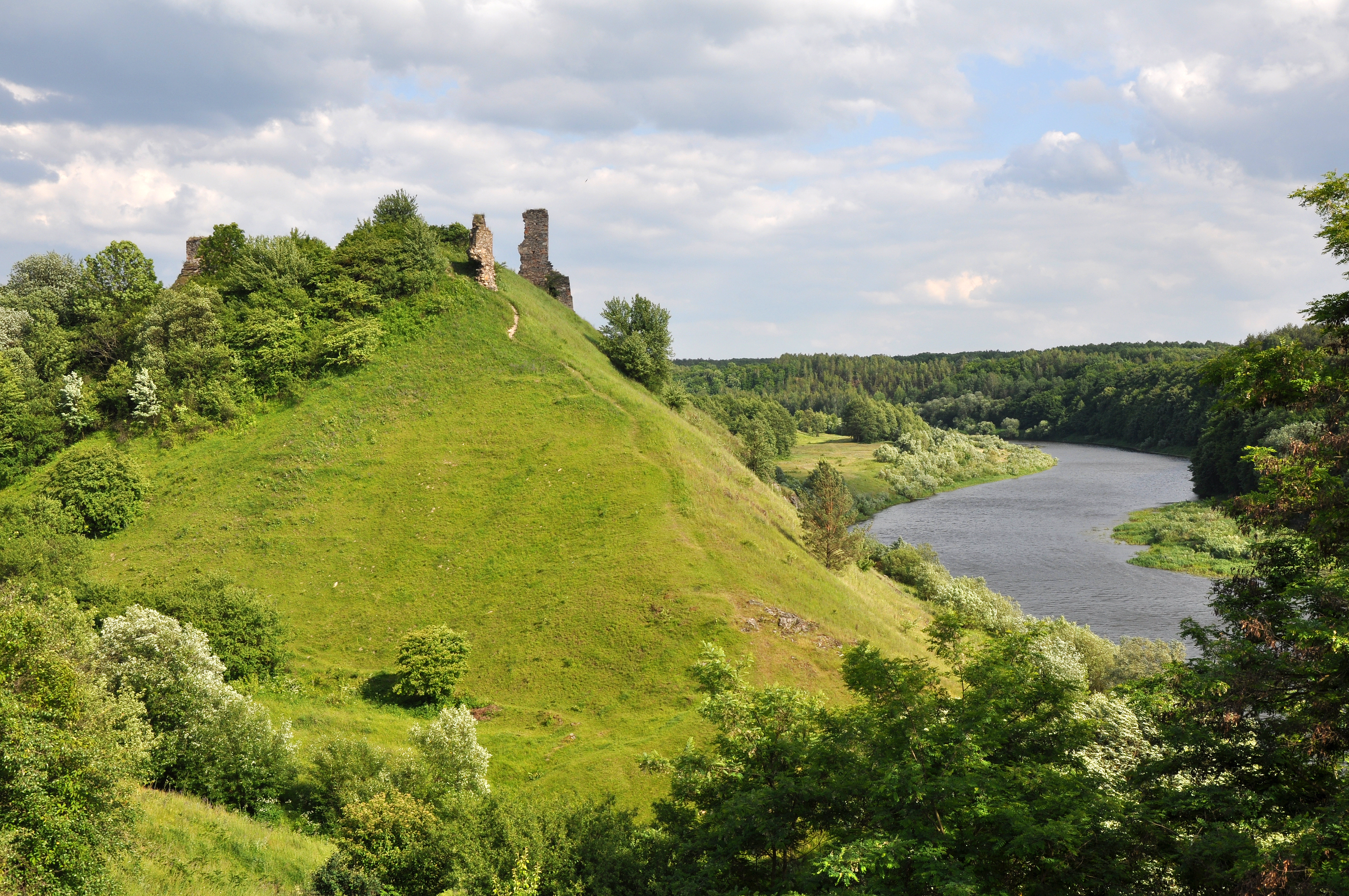
- Sluch River near Hubkiv

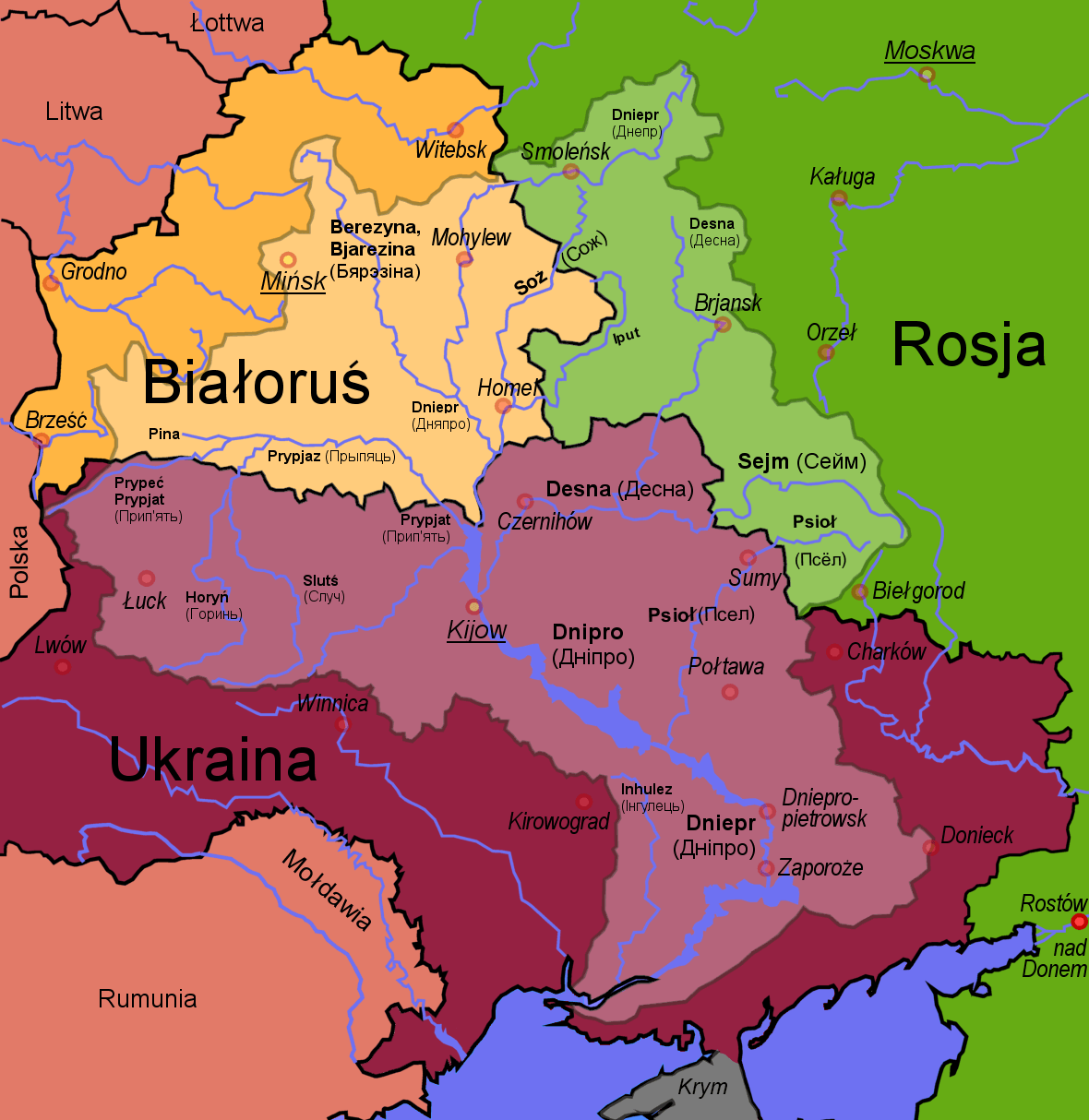
- Sluch River (shown crossing light purple region)
- Native name: Случ (Ukrainian)

Location
- Country: Ukraine

Physical characteristics
- Source
  - location: Khmelnytskyi Oblast, Ukraine
- Mouth: Horyn
  - coordinates: 51.6376°N 26.6457°E
- Length: 451 km (280 mi)
- Basin size: 13,800 km^{2} (5,300 sq mi)

Basin features
- Progression: Horyn→ Pripyat→ Dnieper→ Dnieper–Bug estuary→ Black Sea

The Sluch or Southern Sluch (Ukrainian: Случ; Russian: Случь, Южная Случь; Polish: Słucz; Czech: Sluč, Jižní Sluč) is a river in Ukraine. It is a right tributary of the Horyn. It has a length of 451 kilometres (280 mi) and a drainage basin of 13,800 square kilometres (5,300 sq mi). The Sluch takes its source in the Ukrainian oblast of Khmelnytskyi. It then flows through the Zhytomyr and Rivne oblasts, and briefly along the Ukrainian-Belarusian border before finally emptying into the Horyn.

Cities and towns located on the Sluch river include: Zviahel, Berezne, and Sarny.

== Geography ==
The source of the Sluch is situated near Hubkov, in the Podolian Upland. It flows from a small lake near the village of Chervony Sluch of Halchynetska village council of Theophyll district of the Khmelnytsky Oblast. In the lower reaches in the Podolian Lowland. First, it flows east, then gradually returns to the north, then to the northwest, and from the city of Sarny - again to the north. Falls to Horyn, south of Velyun village.

Large settlements on the Sluch: Krasyliv, Starokostiantyniv, Liubar, Myropil, Portselianove (1934–2024: Pershotravensk), Baranivka, Rohachiv, Zviahel, Berezne, and Sarny.

=== Tributaries ===
The main tributaries are

- Left: Ikopot, Osyra, Khomora, Smilka, Tserem, Korchyk, Stavy, Serehivka, Yazvynka, Mykhailivka
- Right: Rudnia (Lubianka), Tnia, Tiukelivka, Popivka, Bober, Polychna, Tustal.

== Ichthyofauna ==
The Ichthyofauna of the river is represented by 37 species of cyclostomes and fish, the largest number of species occurs near the village Marinin of Bereznovsky district (36 species). According to the Red Data Book of Ukraine, the conservation status of the ichthyofauna of the river is ordinary Leuciscus leuciscus, Linnaeus, Carassius carassius, Linnaeus and Lota lota, Linnaeus in the vulnerable category, as well as Russian albino (Alburnoides rossicus, Berg, 1924), lobster gulls (Eupallasella percnurus, Pallas, 1814), Drenier's Marsh (Barbus borysthenicus, Dybowski, 1862), Gymnochepus acerinus, Gueldenstaedt, 1774, Ukrainian Minogue (Eudontomyzon mariae, Berg, 1931) in the category fading The most numerous species are pike, gossip, redhead, verkhovka, ploskryk, beetle, wild boar, perch.

== Human history ==
Along the river bank in Zhytomyr oblast, on the 120th kilometer, there is the Novograd-Volynskyi "Stalin Line", built in 1932–1939. The most famous place of this church is the Gul Mine, located in the village of Gulsk. In April 2012, the small planet No. 251001 was named Sluch in honor of the river.

== Ecological catastrophe ==
April 14, 2016, in connection with the catastrophic environmental situation - the pollution of an unknown substance of the Khomor and Sluch rivers, which led to the mass death of living organisms: fish, crayfish and others - was banned the use of water from rivers, watering cattle, discharge to the rivers of the feathered bird, fish and crayfish. [2]

== See also ==
- Sluch (Belarus), or Northern Sluch

== Notes ==
Top ↑ Goryev LM, Peleshenko VI, Khilchevsky V.K. Hydrochemistry of Ukraine. K .: Higher school, 1995. - 307 pp. ISBN 5-11-004522-4 Top ↑ http://baranivkarda.org.ua/index.php/novyny/2800-uvaha-zabrudnena-voda

== Sources ==
- Geographical Encyclopedia of Ukraine: 3 t. / Editorial Board: O. M. Marinych (repl. Ed.) And others. - K.: "Ukrainian Soviet Encyclopedia" by them. M.P. Bazhana, 1989.
- Ichthyofauna cadastre of the Rivne region / Grohovskaya Yu.R., Volovik G.P., Konontsev S.V. and others; Ed. Moshinsky V. S. and Grohovskaya Yu. R. - Rivne: Doka-center, 2012. - 200 p
