= 2009 UEFA European Under-19 Championship squads =

Player listings in youth football competition

Players born on or after 1 January 1990 were eligible to participate in the tournament. Players' age as of 21 July 2009 – the tournament's opening day. Players in bold have later been capped at full international level.

== Group A ==
=== England ===
Head coach: Brian Eastick

No.	Pos.	Player	Date of birth (age)	Caps	Goals	Club
1	GK	Jason Steele	18 August 1990 (aged 18)	12	0	(The Football Association) Middlesbrough
2	DF	**Kieran Trippier**	19 September 1990 (aged 18)	8	0	(The Football Association) Manchester City
3	DF	Joe Mattock	15 May 1990 (aged 19)	9	0	(The Football Association) Leicester City
4	MF	Dan Gosling	2 February 1990 (aged 19)	4	0	(The Football Association) Everton
5	DF	**Kyle Walker**	28 May 1990 (aged 19)	2	0	(The Football Association) Sheffield United
6	DF	**Gavin Hoyte**	6 June 1990 (aged 19)	9	0	(The Football Association) Arsenal
7	FW	**Danny Welbeck**	26 November 1990 (aged 18)	5	0	(The Football Association) Manchester United
8	MF	**Danny Drinkwater**	5 March 1990 (aged 19)	9	1	(The Football Association) Manchester United
9	FW	Nile Ranger	11 April 1991 (aged 18)	4	4	(The Football Association) Newcastle United
10	FW	Nathan Delfouneso	2 February 1991 (aged 18)	9	3	(The Football Association) Aston Villa
11	MF	Henri Lansbury	12 October 1990 (aged 18)	7	4	(The Football Association) Arsenal
12	FW	Rhys Murphy	6 November 1990 (aged 18)	4	3	(The Football Association) Arsenal
13	GK	Declan Rudd	16 January 1991 (aged 18)	0	0	(The Football Association) Norwich City
14	MF	Matty James	22 July 1991 (aged 17)	3	0	(The Football Association) Manchester United
15	MF	**Andros Townsend**	16 July 1991 (aged 18)	0	0	(The Football Association) Tottenham Hotspur
16	DF	Joe Bennett	28 March 1990 (aged 19)	0	0	(The Football Association) Middlesbrough
17	MF	Andrew Tutte	21 September 1990 (aged 18)	3	0	(The Football Association) Manchester City
18	DF	**Matthew Briggs**	19 March 1991 (aged 18)	3	0	(The Football Association) Fulham

=== Slovenia ===
Head coach: Miloš Kostič

No.	Pos.	Player	Date of birth (age)	Caps	Goals	Club
1	GK	Matej Radan	13 May 1990 (aged 19)	5	0	(Football Association of Slovenia) Maribor
2	DF	**Boban Jović**	25 June 1990 (aged 19)	5	0	(Football Association of Slovenia) Aluminij
3	DF	Alen Vučkić	1 February 1990 (aged 19)	19	4	(Football Association of Slovenia) Domžale
4	MF	**Miha Mevlja**	12 June 1990 (aged 19)	5	0	(Football Association of Slovenia) Gorica
5	DF	Matej Rapnik	24 February 1990 (aged 19)	3	0	(Football Association of Slovenia) Interblock
6	DF	Anel Omerovič	21 July 1990 (aged 19)	12	3	(Football Association of the Czech Republic) Sparta Prague
7	MF	**Haris Vučkić**	21 August 1992 (aged 16)	4	0	(The Football Association) Newcastle United
8	DF	**Martin Milec**	20 September 1991 (aged 17)	10	1	(Football Association of Slovenia) Aluminij
9	FW	Armend Sprečo	27 May 1990 (aged 19)	7	1	(Football Association of Slovenia) Maribor
10	MF	**Dejan Lazarevič**	15 February 1990 (aged 19)	8	1	(Italian Football Federation) Genoa
11	FW	Dejan Zadnikar	2 November 1990 (aged 18)	4	0	(Football Association of Slovenia) Interblock
12	GK	Franci Biček	27 November 1990 (aged 18)	0	0	(Football Association of Slovenia) Domžale
13	FW	Leon Črnčič	2 March 1990 (aged 19)	2	0	(Football Association of Slovenia) Aluminij
14	MF	Rajko Rep	20 June 1990 (aged 19)	9	6	(Football Association of Slovenia) Celje
15	DF	David Jerkovič	3 May 1990 (aged 19)	3	0	(Football Association of Slovenia) Triglav Kranj
16	FW	Dejan Dimitrov	26 August 1990 (aged 18)	5	1	(Football Association of Slovenia) Triglav Kranj
17	MF	Matic Fink	27 February 1990 (aged 19)	3	0	(Football Association of Slovenia) Interblock
18	DF	Nejc Mevlja	12 June 1990 (aged 19)	3	0	(Football Association of Slovenia) Gorica

=== Switzerland ===
Head coach: Claude Ryf

No.	Pos.	Player	Date of birth (age)	Caps	Goals	Club
1	GK	Oliver Klaus	4 May 1990 (aged 19)			(Swiss Football Association) Basel
2	MF	**Michael Lang**	8 February 1991 (aged 18)			(Swiss Football Association) St. Gallen
3	DF	Raphael Koch	20 January 1990 (aged 19)			(Swiss Football Association) Zürich
4	DF	Philippe Koch	8 February 1991 (aged 18)			(Swiss Football Association) Zürich
5	DF	**Rolf Feltscher**	6 October 1990 (aged 18)			(Swiss Football Association) Grasshopper
6	MF	**Amir Abrashi**	27 March 1990 (aged 19)			(Swiss Football Association) Winterthur
7	FW	**Marco Schönbächler**	11 January 1990 (aged 19)			(Swiss Football Association) Zürich
8	MF	**Vullnet Basha**	11 July 1990 (aged 19)			(Swiss Football Association) Grasshopper
9	FW	Orhan Mustafi	4 April 1990 (aged 19)			(Swiss Football Association) Basel
10	FW	Daniel Ünal	18 January 1990 (aged 19)			(Swiss Football Association) Basel
11	MF	Sébastien Wüthrich	29 May 1990 (aged 19)			(Swiss Football Association) Neuchâtel Xamax
12	GK	Christopher Meylan	24 September 1990 (aged 18)			(Swiss Football Association) Yverdon-Sport
13	DF	Fabio Daprelà	19 February 1991 (aged 18)			(Swiss Football Association) Grasshopper
14	DF	**François Affolter**	13 March 1991 (aged 18)			(Swiss Football Association) Young Boys
15	MF	Bruce Lalombongo	29 April 1990 (aged 19)			(Swiss Football Association) Grasshopper
16	MF	**Alain Wiss**	21 August 1990 (aged 18)			(Swiss Football Association) Lucerne
17	MF	Alexandre Pasche	31 May 1991 (aged 18)			(Swiss Football Association) Young Boys
18	FW	**Admir Mehmedi**	16 March 1991 (aged 18)			(Swiss Football Association) Zürich

=== Ukraine ===
Head coach: Yuri Kalitvintsev

No.	Pos.	Player	Date of birth (age)	Caps	Goals	Club
1	GK	Ihor Levchenko	23 February 1991 (aged 18)			(Ukrainian Association of Football) Olimpik Donetsk
2	DF	Dmytro Kushnirov	1 April 1990 (aged 19)			(Ukrainian Association of Football) Dynamo Kyiv
3	DF	Temur Partsvaniya	6 July 1991 (aged 17)			(Ukrainian Association of Football) Dynamo Kyiv
4	DF	**Serhiy Kryvtsov**	15 March 1991 (aged 18)			(Ukrainian Association of Football) Metalurh Zaporizhya
5	DF	Maksym Bilyi	21 June 1990 (aged 18)			(Ukrainian Association of Football) Shakhtar Donetsk
6	FW	Vitaliy Vitsenets	3 August 1990 (aged 18)			(Ukrainian Association of Football) Shakhtar Donetsk
7	FW	Dmytro Korkishko	4 May 1990 (aged 19)			(Ukrainian Association of Football) Dynamo Kyiv
8	MF	Kyrylo Petrov	22 June 1990 (aged 18)			(Ukrainian Association of Football) Dynamo Kyiv
9	MF	**Denys Harmash**	19 April 1990 (aged 19)			(Ukrainian Association of Football) Dynamo Kyiv
10	MF	Artur Karnoza	2 August 1990 (aged 18)			(Ukrainian Association of Football) Dnipro Dnipropetrovsk
11	FW	Serhiy Shevchuk	21 September 1990 (aged 18)			(Ukrainian Association of Football) Dynamo Kyiv
12	GK	Vyacheslav Bazylevych	7 August 1990 (aged 18)			(Ukrainian Association of Football) Shakhtar Donetsk
13	DF	**Bohdan Butko**	13 January 1991 (aged 18)			(Ukrainian Association of Football) Shakhtar Donetsk
14	MF	**Yevhen Shakhov**	30 November 1990 (aged 18)			(Ukrainian Association of Football) Dnipro Dnipropetrovsk
15	MF	**Serhiy Rybalka**	1 April 1990 (aged 19)			(Ukrainian Association of Football) Dynamo Kyiv
16	GK	**Maksym Koval**	9 December 1992 (aged 16)			(Ukrainian Association of Football) Metalurh Zaporizhya
17	FW	Vitaliy Kaverin	4 September 1990 (aged 18)			(Ukrainian Association of Football) Dnipro Dnipropetrovsk
18	MF	Dmytro Yeremenko	20 June 1990 (aged 18)			(Ukrainian Association of Football) Dynamo Kyiv
19	MF	Ihor Chaykovskyi	7 October 1991 (aged 17)			(Ukrainian Association of Football) Shakhtar Donetsk
20	DF	Serhiy Lohinov	24 August 1990 (aged 18)			(Ukrainian Association of Football) Dynamo Kyiv
21	DF	Serhiy Lyulka	22 February 1990 (aged 19)			(Ukrainian Association of Football) Dynamo Kyiv

== Group B ==
=== France ===
Head coach: Jean Gallice

No.	Pos.	Player	Date of birth (age)	Caps	Goals	Club
1	GK	Franck L'Hostis	3 April 1990 (aged 19)	1	0	(French Football Federation) Monaco
2	DF	Mickaël Nelson	2 February 1990 (aged 19)	8	0	(French Football Federation) Montpellier
3	DF	**Sébastien Corchia**	1 November 1990 (aged 18)	16	0	(French Football Federation) Le Mans
4	MF	**Alfred N'Diaye**	6 March 1990 (aged 19)	11	0	(French Football Federation) Nancy
5	DF	**Abdelhamid El Kaoutari**	18 March 1990 (aged 19)	2	0	(French Football Federation) Montpellier
6	MF	Saïd Mehamha	4 September 1990 (aged 18)	5	0	(French Football Federation) Lyon
7	FW	Damien Le Tallec	19 April 1990 (aged 19)	12	6	(French Football Federation) Rennes
8	MF	**Yann M'Vila**	29 June 1990 (aged 19)	16	3	(French Football Federation) Rennes
9	FW	Emmanuel Rivière	3 March 1990 (aged 19)	2	2	(French Football Federation) Saint-Étienne
10	MF	**Frédéric Bulot**	27 September 1990 (aged 18)	14	1	(French Football Federation) Monaco
11	FW	Magaye Gueye	6 July 1990 (aged 19)	12	5	(French Football Federation) Strasbourg
12	DF	Tripy Makonda	24 January 1990 (aged 19)	7	1	(French Football Federation) Paris Saint-Germain
13	MF	**Ryad Boudebouz**	18 March 1990 (aged 19)	6	1	(French Football Federation) Sochaux
14	DF	Mathieu Peybernes	21 October 1990 (aged 18)	6	0	(French Football Federation) Sochaux
15	MF	**Josuha Guilavogui**	19 September 1990 (aged 18)	9	1	(French Football Federation) Saint-Étienne
16	GK	Rémi Pillot	27 July 1990 (aged 18)	4	0	(French Football Federation) Nancy
17	MF	Maxime Partouche	5 June 1990 (aged 19)	6	2	(French Football Federation) Paris Saint-Germain
18	MF	**Yacine Brahimi**	8 February 1990 (aged 19)	16	11	(French Football Federation) Rennes

=== Serbia ===
Head coach: Aleksandar Stanojević

No.	Pos.	Player	Date of birth (age)	Caps	Goals	Club
1	GK	Nikola Matek	5 October 1990 (aged 18)	0	0	(Football Association of Serbia) OFK Belgrade
2	DF	Aleksandar Miljković	26 February 1990 (aged 19)	3	0	(Football Association of Serbia) Teleoptik
3	DF	Dejan Blagojević	9 February 1990 (aged 19)	0	0	(Football Association of Serbia) Zemun
4	MF	Slobodan Medojević	20 November 1990 (aged 18)	3	1	(Football Association of Serbia) Vojvodina
5	DF	Nemanja Crnoglavac	13 January 1990 (aged 19)	3	0	(Football Association of Serbia) Zemun
6	DF	Gojko Ivković	20 May 1990 (aged 19)			(Norwegian Football Federation) Viking
7	FW	**Danijel Aleksić**	30 April 1991 (aged 18)	3	2	(Football Association of Serbia) Vojvodina
8	FW	**Filip Đuričić**	30 January 1992 (aged 17)			(Royal Dutch Football Association) Heerenveen
9	FW	Nemanja Milić	25 May 1990 (aged 19)	3	1	(Football Association of Serbia) OFK Belgrade
10	FW	**Adem Ljajić**	29 September 1991 (aged 17)	3	2	(Football Association of Serbia) Partizan
11	MF	Milan Pršo	29 June 1990 (aged 19)			(Football Association of Serbia) Rad
12	GK	Aleksandar Kirovski	25 December 1990 (aged 18)	3	0	(Football Association of Serbia) Zemun
13	DF	Miloš Cvetković	6 January 1990 (aged 19)	1	0	(Football Association of Serbia) Zemun
14	MF	Uroš Matić	23 May 1990 (aged 19)	1	0	(Slovak Football Association) Košice
15	DF	Milan Milanović	31 March 1991 (aged 18)	3	1	(Russian Football Union) Lokomotiv Moscow
16	DF	Filip Pjević	29 May 1991 (aged 18)			(Football Association of Serbia) OFK Belgrade
17	MF	Mihajlo Cakić	27 May 1990 (aged 19)			(Football Association of Serbia) Zemun
18	FW	Milan Bubalo	8 May 1990 (aged 19)	1	0	(Football Association of Serbia) Inđija

=== Spain ===
Head coach: Luis Milla

No.	Pos.	Player	Date of birth (age)	Caps	Goals	Club
1	GK	**David de Gea**	7 November 1990 (aged 18)	13	0	(Royal Spanish Football Federation) Atlético Madrid
2	DF	**Mario Gaspar**	24 November 1990 (aged 18)	10	2	(Royal Spanish Football Federation) Villarreal
3	DF	Alberto Morgado	10 May 1990 (aged 19)	8	0	(Royal Spanish Football Federation) Real Sociedad
4	DF	Jorge Pulido	8 March 1991 (aged 18)	9	0	(Royal Spanish Football Federation) Atlético Madrid
5	DF	David Rochela	19 February 1990 (aged 19)	10	1	(Royal Spanish Football Federation) Deportivo La Coruña
6	MF	Oriol Romeu	24 September 1991 (aged 17)	0	0	(Royal Spanish Football Federation) Barcelona
7	MF	Jordi Pablo	1 January 1990 (aged 19)	10	2	(Royal Spanish Football Federation) Villarreal
8	MF	Óscar Sielva	6 August 1991 (aged 17)	6	2	(Royal Spanish Football Federation) Espanyol
9	FW	**Joselu**	27 March 1990 (aged 19)	8	1	(Royal Spanish Football Federation) Celta Vigo
10	MF	Fran Mérida	4 March 1990 (aged 19)	15	7	(The Football Association) Arsenal
11	FW	Iago Falque	4 April 1990 (aged 19)	8	3	(Italian Football Federation) Juventus
12	DF	**Nacho**	18 January 1990 (aged 19)	8	2	(Royal Spanish Football Federation) Real Madrid
13	GK	Diego Mariño	9 May 1990 (aged 19)	5	0	(Royal Spanish Football Federation) Villarreal
14	MF	**Thiago**	11 April 1991 (aged 18)	2	1	(Royal Spanish Football Federation) Barcelona
15	DF	**Marcos Alonso**	28 December 1990 (aged 18)	2	0	(Royal Spanish Football Federation) Real Madrid
16	MF	**Sergio Canales**	16 February 1991 (aged 18)	0	0	(Royal Spanish Football Federation) Racing Santander
17	FW	Raúl Ruiz	25 March 1990 (aged 19)	3	1	(Royal Spanish Football Federation) Hércules
18	FW	Dani Aquino	27 July 1990 (aged 18)	16	5	(Royal Spanish Football Federation) Real Murcia

=== Turkey ===
Head coach: Ogün Temizkanoğlu

No.	Pos.	Player	Date of birth (age)	Caps	Goals	Club
1	GK	Emirhan Ergün	18 February 1990 (aged 19)			(Turkish Football Federation) Galatasaray
2	DF	Serkan Kurtuluş	1 January 1990 (aged 19)			(Turkish Football Federation) Galatasaray
3	DF	Özgür Çek	3 January 1991 (aged 18)			(Turkish Football Federation) Fenerbahçe
4	DF	**Serdar Aziz**	28 October 1990 (aged 18)			(Turkish Football Federation) Bursaspor
5	DF	Sinan Osmanoğlu	9 January 1990 (aged 19)			(Turkish Football Federation) Galatasaray
6	DF	**Soner Aydoğdu**	5 January 1991 (aged 18)			(Turkish Football Federation) Gençlerbirliği
7	MF	Uğur Parlak	27 January 1990 (aged 19)			(Turkish Football Federation) Dardanel Spor
8	FW	Onur Ayık	27 January 1990 (aged 19)			(German Football Association) Werder Bremen II
9	FW	**Sercan Yıldırım**	5 April 1990 (aged 19)			(Turkish Football Federation) Bursaspor
10	MF	Umut Sözen	27 January 1990 (aged 19)			(Turkish Football Federation) Ankaraspor
11	FW	**Tunay Torun**	21 April 1990 (aged 19)			(German Football Association) Hamburger SV
12	GK	Bayram Olgun	6 April 1990 (aged 19)			(Turkish Football Federation) Ankaragücü
13	DF	Çetin Güngör	7 June 1990 (aged 19)			(Turkish Football Federation) Galatasaray
14	MF	**Eren Albayrak**	23 April 1991 (aged 18)			(Turkish Football Federation) Bursaspor
15	DF	Yavuz Özsevim	13 July 1990 (aged 19)			(Turkish Football Federation) Dardanel Spor
16	MF	Rıdvan Şimşek	17 January 1991 (aged 18)			(Turkish Football Federation) Karşıyaka
17	DF	Murat Akça	13 July 1990 (aged 19)			(Turkish Football Federation) Galatasaray
18	DF	**Necip Uysal**	24 January 1991 (aged 18)			(Turkish Football Federation) Beşiktaş
