= 2007 UEFA European Under-17 Championship squads =

Football tournament squads

Below are the rosters for the UEFA U-17 Championship 2007 tournament in Belgium.

Players' ages as of the tournament's opening day (2 May 2007).

== Group A ==
=== France ===
Head coach: François Blaquart

| No. | Pos. | Player | Date of birth (age) | Caps | Goals | Club |
|---|---|---|---|---|---|---|
| 1 | GK | Joris Delle | 29 March 1990 (aged 17) | | | (French Football Federation) Metz |
| 2 | DF | Nicolas Seguin | 6 March 1990 (aged 17) | | | (French Football Federation) Lyon |
| 3 | DF | Abdelhamid El Kaoutari | 17 March 1990 (aged 17) | | | (French Football Federation) Montpellier |
| 4 | DF | Matthieu Saunier | 7 February 1990 (aged 17) | | | (French Football Federation) Bordeaux |
| 5 | MF | Alfred N'Diaye | 6 March 1990 (aged 17) | | | (French Football Federation) Nancy |
| 6 | MF | Omar Benzerga | 16 January 1990 (aged 17) | | | (French Football Federation) Lille |
| 7 | FW | Damien Le Tallec | 19 April 1990 (aged 17) | | | (French Football Federation) Rennes |
| 8 | FW | Martial Riff | 22 February 1990 (aged 17) | | | (French Football Federation) Sochaux |
| 9 | MF | Fabrice N'Sakala | 21 July 1990 (aged 16) | | | (French Football Federation) Troyes |
| 10 | FW | Vincent Acapandié | 9 February 1990 (aged 17) | | | (French Football Federation) Auxerre |
| 11 | FW | Thibaut Bourgeois | 5 January 1990 (aged 17) | | | (French Football Federation) Metz |
| 12 | MF | Yann M'Vila | 29 June 1990 (aged 16) | | | (French Football Federation) Rennes |
| 13 | DF | Aristote Lusinga | 20 February 1990 (aged 17) | | | (French Football Federation) Nantes |
| 14 | MF | Frédéric Duplus | 7 April 1990 (aged 17) | | | (French Football Federation) Sochaux |
| 15 | FW | Henri Saivet | 26 October 1990 (aged 16) | | | (French Football Federation) Bordeaux |
| 16 | GK | Mathieu Gorgelin | 5 August 1990 (aged 16) | | | (French Football Federation) Lyon |
| 17 | MF | Saïd Mehamha | 4 September 1990 (aged 16) | | | (French Football Federation) Lyon |
| 18 | DF | Mamadou Sakho | 13 February 1990 (aged 17) | | | (French Football Federation) Paris Saint-Germain |

=== Germany ===
Head coach: Paul Schomann

| No. | Pos. | Player | Date of birth (age) | Caps | Goals | Club |
|---|---|---|---|---|---|---|
| 1 | GK | Fabian Giefer | 17 May 1990 (aged 16) | | | (German Football Association) Bayer Leverkusen |
| 2 | FW | Markus Untch | 29 April 1990 (aged 17) | | | (German Football Association) 1. FC Nürnberg |
| 3 | DF | Nils Teixeira | 10 July 1990 (aged 16) | | | (German Football Association) Bayer Leverkusen |
| 4 | DF | Marvin Pachan | 11 April 1990 (aged 17) | | | (German Football Association) Schalke 04 |
| 5 | MF | Konstantin Rausch | 15 March 1990 (aged 17) | | | (German Football Association) Hannover 96 |
| 6 | MF | Kevin Wolze | 9 March 1990 (aged 17) | | | (The Football Association) Bolton Wanderers |
| 7 | FW | Henning Sauerbier | 6 January 1990 (aged 17) | | | (German Football Association) Bayer Leverkusen |
| 8 | MF | Patrick Funk | 11 February 1990 (aged 17) | | | (German Football Association) VfB Stuttgart |
| 9 | MF | Sascha Bigalke | 8 January 1990 (aged 17) | | | (German Football Association) Hertha BSC |
| 10 | MF | Toni Kroos | 4 January 1990 (aged 17) | | | (German Football Association) Bayern Munich |
| 11 | FW | Marvin Knoll | 5 December 1990 (aged 16) | | | (German Football Association) Hertha BSC |
| 12 | GK | René Vollath | 20 March 1990 (aged 17) | | | (German Football Association) 1. FC Nürnberg |
| 13 | DF | Kai-Bastian Evers | 4 April 1990 (aged 17) | | | (German Football Association) Borussia Dortmund |
| 14 | DF | Viktor Maier | 12 June 1990 (aged 16) | | | (German Football Association) Hamburger SV |
| 15 | MF | Tony Jantschke | 7 April 1990 (aged 17) | | | (German Football Association) Borussia Mönchengladbach |
| 16 | FW | Dennis Dowidat | 10 January 1990 (aged 17) | | | (German Football Association) Borussia Mönchengladbach |
| 17 | FW | Richard Sukuta-Pasu | 24 June 1990 (aged 16) | | | (German Football Association) Bayer Leverkusen |
| 18 | FW | Eric Tappiser | 1 February 1990 (aged 17) | | | (German Football Association) Borussia Mönchengladbach |

=== Spain ===
Head coach: Juan Santisteban

| No. | Pos. | Player | Date of birth (age) | Caps | Goals | Club |
|---|---|---|---|---|---|---|
| 1 | GK | Yelco Ramos | 23 February 1990 (aged 17) | | | (Royal Spanish Football Federation) Albacete |
| 2 | DF | Moisés Jiménez | 29 June 1990 (aged 16) | | | (Royal Spanish Football Federation) Sevilla |
| 3 | DF | Alberto Morgado | 10 May 1990 (aged 16) | | | (Royal Spanish Football Federation) Alavés |
| 4 | DF | David Rochela | 19 February 1990 (aged 17) | | | (Royal Spanish Football Federation) Deportivo La Coruña |
| 5 | DF | Nacho | 18 January 1990 (aged 17) | | | (Royal Spanish Football Federation) Real Madrid |
| 6 | MF | Ignacio Camacho | 4 May 1990 (aged 16) | | | (Royal Spanish Football Federation) Atlético Madrid |
| 7 | MF | Ximo Forner | 27 January 1990 (aged 17) | | | (Royal Spanish Football Federation) Valencia |
| 8 | MF | David González | 20 January 1990 (aged 17) | | | (Royal Spanish Football Federation) Barcelona |
| 9 | FW | Bojan | 28 August 1990 (aged 16) | | | (Royal Spanish Football Federation) Barcelona |
| 10 | MF | Fran Mérida | 4 March 1990 (aged 17) | | | (The Football Association) Arsenal |
| 11 | FW | Isma López | 29 January 1990 (aged 17) | | | (Royal Spanish Football Federation) Athletic Bilbao |
| 12 | FW | Lucas Porcar | 18 February 1990 (aged 17) | | | (Royal Spanish Football Federation) Espanyol |
| 13 | GK | David de Gea | 7 November 1990 (aged 16) | | | (Royal Spanish Football Federation) Atlético Madrid |
| 14 | FW | Iago Falque | 4 January 1990 (aged 17) | | | (Royal Spanish Football Federation) Barcelona |
| 15 | DF | Sergio Rodríguez | 22 August 1990 (aged 16) | | | (Royal Spanish Football Federation) Atlético Madrid |
| 16 | FW | Dani Aquino | 27 July 1990 (aged 16) | | | (Royal Spanish Football Federation) Real Murcia |
| 17 | DF | Pichu Atienza | 18 January 1990 (aged 17) | | | (Royal Spanish Football Federation) Atlético Madrid |
| 18 | FW | Ander Vitoria | 22 January 1990 (aged 17) | | | (Royal Spanish Football Federation) Athletic Bilbao |

=== Ukraine ===
Head coach: Yuriy Kalitvintsev

| No. | Pos. | Player | Date of birth (age) | Caps | Goals | Club |
|---|---|---|---|---|---|---|
| 1 | GK | Anton Sytnykov | 12 July 1991 (aged 15) | | | (Ukrainian Association of Football) Dynamo Kyiv |
| 2 | DF | Dmytro Kushnirov | 1 April 1990 (aged 17) | | | (Ukrainian Association of Football) RUFK Kyiv |
| 3 | DF | Oleksandr Stetsenko | 2 March 1990 (aged 17) | | | (Ukrainian Association of Football) FC Vidradnyi |
| 4 | DF | Maksym Maksymenko | 28 May 1990 (aged 16) | | | (Ukrainian Association of Football) Shakhtar Donetsk |
| 5 | DF | Volodymyr Pidvirnyi | 12 January 1990 (aged 17) | | | (Ukrainian Association of Football) Karpaty Lviv |
| 6 | FW | Vitaliy Vitsenets | 3 August 1990 (aged 16) | | | (Ukrainian Association of Football) Shakhtar Donetsk |
| 7 | FW | Dmytro Korkishko | 4 May 1990 (aged 16) | | | (Ukrainian Association of Football) Dynamo Kyiv |
| 8 | MF | Kyrylo Petrov | 22 June 1990 (aged 16) | | | (Ukrainian Association of Football) Dynamo Kyiv |
| 9 | MF | Ilya Mikhalyov | 31 July 1990 (aged 16) | | | (Ukrainian Association of Football) Shakhtar Donetsk |
| 10 | MF | Artur Karnoza | 2 August 1990 (aged 16) | | | (Ukrainian Association of Football) Dnipro Dnipropetrovsk |
| 11 | FW | Serhiy Shevchuk | 21 September 1990 (aged 16) | | | (Ukrainian Association of Football) Dynamo Kyiv |
| 12 | DF | Anatoliy Mudrak | 14 November 1990 (aged 16) | | | (Ukrainian Association of Football) Inter-Lilia Dnipropetrovsk |
| 13 | DF | Maksym Bilyi | 21 June 1990 (aged 16) | | | (Ukrainian Association of Football) Shakhtar Donetsk |
| 14 | MF | Yevhen Shakhov | 30 November 1990 (aged 16) | | | (Ukrainian Association of Football) Dnipro Dnipropetrovsk |
| 15 | DF | Dmytro Nyemchaninov | 27 January 1990 (aged 17) | | | (Ukrainian Association of Football) RUFK Kyiv |
| 16 | MF | Denys Harmash | 19 April 1990 (aged 17) | | | (Ukrainian Association of Football) RUFK Kyiv |
| 17 | FW | Dmytro Yeremenko | 20 June 1990 (aged 16) | | | (Ukrainian Association of Football) Volyn Lutsk |
| 18 | GK | Vyacheslav Bazylevych | 7 September 1990 (aged 16) | | | (Ukrainian Association of Football) Shakhtar Donetsk |

== Group B ==
=== Belgium ===
Head coach: Bob Browaeys

| No. | Pos. | Player | Date of birth (age) | Caps | Goals | Club |
|---|---|---|---|---|---|---|
| 1 | GK | Jo Coppens | 21 December 1990 (aged 16) | | | (Royal Belgian Football Association) Genk |
| 2 | DF | Dimitri Daeseleire | 18 May 1990 (aged 16) | | | (Royal Belgian Football Association) Genk |
| 3 | DF | Rudy Ngombo | 25 March 1990 (aged 17) | | | (Royal Belgian Football Association) Standard Liège |
| 4 | DF | Koen Hustinx | 30 January 1990 (aged 17) | | | (Royal Belgian Football Association) Genk |
| 5 | DF | Niels Ringoot | 22 April 1990 (aged 17) | | | (Royal Belgian Football Association) Anderlecht |
| 6 | MF | Laurens Spruyt | 5 January 1990 (aged 17) | | | (Royal Belgian Football Association) Genk |
| 7 | FW | Guillaume François | 3 June 1990 (aged 16) | | | (Royal Belgian Football Association) Mouscron |
| 8 | MF | Cédric Ciza | 2 February 1990 (aged 17) | | | (Royal Belgian Football Association) Anderlecht |
| 9 | FW | Christian Benteke | 3 December 1990 (aged 16) | | | (Royal Belgian Football Association) Genk |
| 10 | MF | Eden Hazard | 7 January 1991 (aged 16) | | | (French Football Federation) Lille |
| 11 | FW | Kevin Kis | 26 September 1990 (aged 16) | | | (Royal Belgian Football Association) Genk |
| 12 | GK | Stefan Deloose | 14 January 1990 (aged 17) | | | (Royal Belgian Football Association) Lokeren |
| 13 | DF | Maxim Geurden | 2 November 1990 (aged 16) | | | (Royal Belgian Football Association) Genk |
| 14 | MF | Sébastien Phiri | 1 July 1990 (aged 16) | | | (Royal Belgian Football Association) Brussels |
| 15 | MF | Kerem Zevne | 16 January 1990 (aged 17) | | | (Royal Belgian Football Association) Genk |
| 16 | FW | Guillaume Clinckemaillie | 7 October 1990 (aged 16) | | | (Royal Belgian Football Association) Anderlecht |
| 17 | FW | Nill De Pauw | 6 January 1990 (aged 17) | | | (Royal Belgian Football Association) Lokeren |
| 18 | FW | Maurizio Aquino | 1 March 1990 (aged 17) | | | (Royal Belgian Football Association) Genk |

=== England ===
Head coach: John Peacock

| No. | Pos. | Player | Date of birth (age) | Caps | Goals | Club |
|---|---|---|---|---|---|---|
| 1 | GK | Jason Steele | 18 August 1990 (aged 16) | | | (The Football Association) Middlesbrough |
| 2 | DF | Seth Ofori-Twumasi | 15 May 1990 (aged 16) | | | (The Football Association) Chelsea |
| 3 | DF | Joe Mattock | 15 May 1990 (aged 16) | | | (The Football Association) Leicester City |
| 4 | MF | Henri Lansbury | 12 October 1990 (aged 16) | | | (The Football Association) Arsenal |
| 5 | DF | Krystian Pearce | 5 January 1990 (aged 17) | | | (The Football Association) Birmingham City |
| 6 | DF | Jordan Spence | 24 May 1990 (aged 16) | | | (The Football Association) West Ham United |
| 7 | FW | Danny Welbeck | 26 November 1990 (aged 16) | | | (The Football Association) Manchester United |
| 8 | FW | Danny Rose | 2 July 1990 (aged 16) | | | (The Football Association) Leeds United |
| 9 | FW | Rhys Murphy | 6 November 1990 (aged 16) | | | (The Football Association) Arsenal |
| 10 | MF | Victor Moses | 12 December 1990 (aged 16) | | | (The Football Association) Crystal Palace |
| 11 | MF | Tristan Plummer | 30 January 1990 (aged 17) | | | (The Football Association) Bristol City |
| 12 | DF | Tom Taiwo | 27 February 1990 (aged 17) | | | (The Football Association) Chelsea |
| 13 | GK | Alex Smithies | 5 March 1990 (aged 17) | | | (The Football Association) Huddersfield Town |
| 14 | MF | Michael Woods | 6 April 1990 (aged 17) | | | (The Football Association) Chelsea |
| 15 | MF | Dan Gosling | 1 February 1990 (aged 17) | | | (The Football Association) Plymouth Argyle |
| 16 | MF | Nathan Porritt | 9 January 1990 (aged 17) | | | (The Football Association) Middlesbrough |
| 17 | MF | Jonathan Franks | 8 April 1990 (aged 17) | | | (The Football Association) Middlesbrough |
| 18 | DF | Gavin Hoyte | 6 June 1990 (aged 16) | | | (The Football Association) Arsenal |

=== Iceland ===
Head coach: Luka Kostić

| No. | Pos. | Player | Date of birth (age) | Caps | Goals | Club |
|---|---|---|---|---|---|---|
| 1 | GK | Vignir Jóhannesson | 6 September 1990 (aged 16) | | | (Football Association of Iceland) Breiðablik |
| 2 | DF | Jóhann Laxdal | 27 January 1990 (aged 17) | | | (Football Association of Iceland) Stjarnan |
| 3 | DF | Kristinn Jónsson | 4 August 1990 (aged 16) | | | (Football Association of Iceland) Breiðablik |
| 4 | MF | Frans Elvarsson | 14 August 1990 (aged 16) | | | (Football Association of Iceland) Njarðvík |
| 5 | MF | Eggert Rafn Einarsson | 28 January 1990 (aged 17) | | | (Football Association of Iceland) KR Reykjavík |
| 6 | MF | Hólmar Örn Eyjólfsson | 6 August 1990 (aged 16) | | | (Football Association of Iceland) HK Kopavogur |
| 7 | DF | Dofri Snorrason | 21 July 1990 (aged 16) | | | (Football Association of Iceland) KR Reykjavík |
| 8 | FW | Ragnar Gunnarsson | 6 June 1990 (aged 16) | | | (Football Association of Iceland) IA Akranes |
| 9 | FW | Viktor Illugason | 25 January 1990 (aged 17) | | | (The Football Association) Reading |
| 10 | MF | Bjorn Jónsson | 7 October 1990 (aged 16) | | | (Royal Dutch Football Association) Heerenveen |
| 11 | FW | Kolbeinn Sigþórsson | 14 March 1990 (aged 17) | | | (Football Association of Iceland) HK Kopavogur |
| 12 | GK | Trausti Sigurbjörnsson | 25 September 1990 (aged 16) | | | (Football Association of Iceland) IA Akranes |
| 13 | MF | Victor Pálsson | 30 April 1991 (aged 16) | | | (Football Association of Iceland) Fylkir |
| 14 | FW | Arnar Geirsson | 30 August 1991 (aged 15) | | | (Football Association of Iceland) Valur |
| 15 | FW | Aron Palomares | 9 March 1990 (aged 17) | | | (Football Association of Iceland) HK Kopavogur |
| 16 | DF | Þórarinn Ingi Valdimarsson | 23 April 1990 (aged 17) | | | (Football Association of Iceland) IBV Vestmannaeyar |
| 17 | FW | Brynjar Benediktsson | 7 February 1990 (aged 17) | | | (Football Association of Iceland) FH Hafnarfjarðar |
| 18 | DF | Finnur Margeirsson | 8 March 1991 (aged 16) | | | (Football Association of Iceland) Breiðablik |
| 19 | GK | Arnar Darri Pétursson | 16 March 1991 (aged 16) | | | (Football Association of Iceland) Stjarnan |

=== Netherlands ===
Head coach: Albert Stuivenberg

| No. | Pos. | Player | Date of birth (age) | Caps | Goals | Club |
|---|---|---|---|---|---|---|
| 1 | GK | Sergio Padt | 6 June 1990 (aged 16) | | | (Royal Dutch Football Association) Ajax |
| 2 | DF | Anthony Bentem | 19 March 1990 (aged 17) | | | (Royal Dutch Football Association) Sparta |
| 3 | DF | Timothy van der Meulen | 2 March 1990 (aged 17) | | | (Royal Dutch Football Association) Ajax |
| 4 | DF | Patrick van Aanholt | 29 August 1990 (aged 16) | | | (Royal Dutch Football Association) PSV |
| 5 | DF | Ridny Cairo | 9 February 1990 (aged 17) | | | (Royal Dutch Football Association) PSV |
| 6 | DF | Daley Blind | 9 March 1990 (aged 17) | | | (Royal Dutch Football Association) Ajax |
| 7 | MF | Nacer Barazite | 27 May 1990 (aged 16) | | | (The Football Association) Arsenal |
| 8 | MF | Leroy Fer | 5 January 1990 (aged 17) | | | (Royal Dutch Football Association) Feyenoord |
| 9 | FW | Género Zeefuik | 5 April 1990 (aged 17) | | | (Royal Dutch Football Association) PSV |
| 10 | MF | Georginio Wijnaldum | 11 November 1990 (aged 16) | | | (Royal Dutch Football Association) Feyenoord |
| 11 | FW | Luciano Narsingh | 13 September 1990 (aged 16) | | | (Royal Dutch Football Association) Heerenveen |
| 12 | DF | Johnny de Vries | 20 February 1990 (aged 17) | | | (Royal Dutch Football Association) Heerenveen |
| 13 | DF | Kaj Ramsteijn | 17 January 1990 (aged 17) | | | (Royal Dutch Football Association) Feyenoord |
| 14 | MF | Marko Vejinović | 3 February 1990 (aged 17) | | | (Royal Dutch Football Association) AZ |
| 15 | MF | Wouter de Vogel | 17 September 1990 (aged 16) | | | (Royal Dutch Football Association) AZ |
| 16 | GK | Jeroen Zoet | 6 January 1991 (aged 16) | | | (Royal Dutch Football Association) PSV |
| 17 | FW | Luís Pedro | 27 April 1990 (aged 17) | | | (Royal Dutch Football Association) Feyenoord |
| 18 | FW | Pepijn Kluin | 23 April 1990 (aged 17) | | | (Royal Dutch Football Association) AZ |
