= 2021 FC Aktobe season =

FC Aktobe
2021 season
- Chairman: Samat Smakov
- Manager: Alyaksey Baha (until 5 May); Vladimir Zelenovskiy (Caretaker) (5 May - 7 June); Vakhid Masudov (7 June - 26 July); Mukhtar Erimbetov (Caretaker) (26 July - 4 August); Vladimir Mukhanov (from 4 August)
- Stadium: Central Stadium
- Premier League: 7th
- Kazakhstan Cup: Group stage
- Top goalscorer: League: Igor Sergeyev (7); All: Igor Sergeyev (7)
- Highest home attendance: 8,200 vs Kairat (16 October 2021)
- Lowest home attendance: 0 vs Tobol (20 March 2021) 0 vs Ordabasy (9 April 2021); 0 vs Shakhter Karagandy (19 April 2021); 0 vs Astana (2 May 2021) 0 vs Astana (14 August 2021)
- Average home league attendance: 2,748 (30 October 2021)
Home colours	Away colours

The 2021 FC Aktobe season was Aktobe's 1st season back in the Kazakhstan Premier League, the highest tier of association football in Kazakhstan, following their relegation from the league in 2019.

== Season events ==
On 6 January, Aktobe announced the signings of Yerkebulan Nurgaliyev, Yury Pertsukh and Didar Zhalmukan.

On 7 January, Aktobe announced the signing of Bojan Dubajić. The following day, 8 January, Hervaine Moukam also joined Aktobe from BATE Borisov.

On 18 February, Aktobe announced the signings of Igor Sergeyev and Tongo Doumbia.

On 27 February, Aktobe announced the signings of Dinmukhamed Kashken, Lasha Totadze, Armen Manucharyan, Michal Jeřábek and Maxim Fedin.

On 10 March, Aktobe where deducted 3 points due to the unavailability of their nominated reserve stadium for their second match-day fixture. On 12 April, Aktobe had these 3 points reinstated after their stadium passed its next inspection and was deemed up to the required standard.

On 14 April, Aktobe announced the signing of Artūras Žulpa and Sergei Revyakin, whilst Esen Zhasanov joined Ekibastuz on loan.

On 5 May, Alyaksey Baha resigned as Head Coach of Aktobe, with Vladimir Zelenovskiy being placed in temporary charge. Later the same day, Aktobe announced the signing of Yury Logvinenko on a free transfer, after he'd left Rotor Volgograd in March 2021.

On 7 June, Vakhid Masudov was announced as Aktobes new Head Coach.

On 9 June, Aktobe announced the signing of Igor Gubanov on a free transfer, after he'd played for Kyzylzhar the previous season.

On 23 June, Aktobe announced that Armen Manucharyan and Lasha Totadze had left the club mutual consent.

On 2 July, Aktobe announced the signing of Dmitry Shomko from Rotor Volgograd.

On 3 July, Vitali Volkov left Aktobe.

On 8 July, Aktobe announced the signing of Zaza Tsitskishvili from Telavi.

On 11 July, Bojan Dubajić left Aktobe.

On 13 July, Aktobe announced the signing of Ramazan Orazov.

On 14 July, Aktobe announced the signing of Temirlan Yerlanov from Ordabasy, and the departure of Igor Gubanov.

On 19 July, Igor Sergeyev left Aktobe to sign for Tobol.

On 26 July, Vakhid Masudov left his role as Head Coach by mutual consent.

On 4 August, Vladimir Mukhanov was appointed as Head Coach of Aktobe for the second time.

On 7 August, Aktobe announced the signing of Nikita Laktionov from Rodina Moscow and Ihar Zyankovich from Minsk.

On 26 August, Aktobe announced the signing of Dmytro Korkishko from Chornomorets Odesa. The following day, 27 August, Vitaliy Balashov signed for Aktobe having left Shakhter Karagandy in June, whilst Joachim Adukor joined on 30 August from Sarajevo.

== Squad ==
As of match played 30 October 2021

No.	Name	Nationality	Position	Date of birth (age)	Signed from	Signed in	Contract ends	Apps.	Goals
Goalkeepers
1	Zhasur Narzikulov	(Kazakhstan)	GK	13 April 1984 (age 42)	Tobol	2020			
16	Sergei Revyakin	(Russia)	GK	2 April 1995 (age 31)	Youth team	2021		11	0
25	Evgeniy Sitdikov	(Kazakhstan)	GK	25 June 2001 (age 25)	Youth team	2020			
Defenders
2	Dinmukhamed Kashken	(Kazakhstan)	DF	4 January 2000 (age 26)	Astana	2021		11	0
6	Rustam Temirkhan	(Kazakhstan)	DF	10 August 1997 (age 29)	Youth Team	2017			
12	Alisher Azhimov	(Kazakhstan)	DF	29 May 2001 (age 25)	Youth Team	2019			
18	Michal Jeřábek	(Czech Republic)	DF	10 September 1993 (age 33)	Jablonec	2021		27	2
19	Ardak Saulet	(Kazakhstan)	DF	12 January 1997 (age 29)	Youth Team	2017			
27	Yury Logvinenko	(Kazakhstan)	DF	22 July 1988 (age 38)	Rotor Volgograd	2021			
31	Adilkhan Tanzharikov	(Kazakhstan)	DF	25 November 1996 (age 29)	Zhetysu	2018			
77	Dmitry Shomko	(Kazakhstan)	DF	19 March 1990 (age 36)	Rotor Volgograd	2021		8	0
80	Temirlan Yerlanov	(Kazakhstan)	DF	9 July 1993 (age 33)	Ordabasy	2021		11	2
Midfielders
7	Oleg Chernyshov	(Russia)	MF	23 December 1986 (age 39)	Tambov	2021			
10	Maksim Samorodov	(Kazakhstan)	MF	29 June 2002 (age 24)	Youth Team	2020			
14	Yury Pertsukh	(Kazakhstan)	MF	13 May 1996 (age 30)	Astana	2021		22	1
20	Yerkebulan Nurgaliyev	(Kazakhstan)	MF	12 September 1993 (age 33)	Caspiy	2021		15	1
23	Rifat Nurmugamet	(Kazakhstan)	MF	22 May 1996 (age 30)	Kairat	2020			
26	Ramazan Orazov	(Kazakhstan)	MF	30 January 1998 (age 28)	Chayka Peschanokopskoye	2021		10	0
29	Zaza Tsitskishvili	(Georgia (country))	MF	4 July 1995 (age 31)	Telavi	2021		5	0
39	Nikita Laktionov	(Russia)	MF	21 November 2000 (age 25)	Rodina Moscow	2021		3	0
44	Artūras Žulpa	(Lithuania)	MF	10 June 1990 (age 36)	Siena	2021		52	1
50	Joachim Adukor	(Ghana)	MF	2 May 1993 (age 33)	Sarajevo	2021		6	0
70	Dmytro Korkishko	(Ukraine)	MF	4 May 1990 (age 36)	Chornomorets Odesa	2021		6	1
73	Didar Zhalmukan	(Kazakhstan)	MF	22 May 1996 (age 30)	Astana	2021			
88	Anton Shurigin	(Kazakhstan)	MF	3 December 1988 (age 37)	Akzhayik	2017			
93	Tongo Doumbia	(Mali)	MF	6 August 1989 (age 37)	Unattached	2021		22	0
94	Hervaine Moukam	(Cameroon)	MF	24 May 1994 (age 32)	BATE Borisov	2021		28	4
96	Maxim Fedin	(Kazakhstan)	MF	8 June 1996 (age 30)	Tobol	2021		28	2
Forwards
33	Ihar Zyankovich	(Belarus)	FW	17 September 1987 (age 39)	Minsk	2021		74	17
79	Ornalin Tauipbek	(Kazakhstan)	FW	7 January 2001 (age 25)	Youth team	2020			
91	Vitaliy Balashov	(Ukraine)	FW	15 January 1991 (age 35)	Unattached	2021		7	2
Players away on loan
17	Esen Zhasanov	(Kazakhstan)	MF	24 April 1998 (age 28)	Youth Team	2020			
Players that left during the season
3	Lasha Totadze	(Georgia (country))	DF	24 August 1988 (age 38)	Samtredia	2021		9	0
4	Demiyat Slambekov	(Kazakhstan)	DF	13 January 1997 (age 29)	Hegelmann Litauen	2020			
5	Armen Manucharyan	(Armenia)	DF	3 February 1995 (age 31)	Rotor Volgograd	2021		11	0
9	Bojan Dubajić	(Serbia)	FW	1 September 1990 (age 36)	BATE Borisov	2021		15	3
11	Igor Sergeyev	(Uzbekistan)	FW	30 April 1993 (age 33)	Pakhtakor Tashkent	2021		20	7
22	Vitali Volkov	(Russia)	MF	22 March 1981 (age 45)	Okzhetpes	2018			
66	Igor Gubanov	(Russia)	DF	4 February 1992 (age 34)	Unattached	2021		5	0

=== Out on loan ===
Note: Flags indicate national team as defined under FIFA eligibility rules; some limited exceptions apply. Players may hold more than one non-FIFA nationality.

No. / Pos. / Nation / Player; 17 / MF / KAZ / Esen Zhasanov (at Ekibastuz)	No. / Pos. / Nation / Player

== Transfers ==
=== In ===
Date	Position	Nationality	Name	From	Fee	Ref.
6 January 2021	MF	(Kazakhstan)	Yerkebulan Nurgaliyev	Caspiy	Undisclosed	
6 January 2021	MF	(Kazakhstan)	Yury Pertsukh	Astana	Undisclosed	
6 January 2021	MF	(Kazakhstan)	Didar Zhalmukan	Astana	Undisclosed	
7 January 2021	FW	(Serbia)	Bojan Dubajić	BATE Borisov	Undisclosed	
8 January 2021	MF	(Cameroon)	Hervaine Moukam	BATE Borisov	Undisclosed	
18 February 2021	FW	(Uzbekistan)	Igor Sergeyev	Pakhtakor Tashkent	Undisclosed	
18 February 2021	MF	(Mali)	Tongo Doumbia	Unattached	Free	
27 February 2021	DF	(Armenia)	Armen Manucharyan	Rotor Volgograd	Undisclosed	
27 February 2021	DF	(Czech Republic)	Michal Jeřábek	Jablonec	Undisclosed	
27 February 2021	DF	(Georgia (country))	Lasha Totadze	Samtredia	Undisclosed	
27 February 2021	DF	(Kazakhstan)	Dinmukhamed Kashken	Astana	Undisclosed	
27 February 2021	DF	(Kazakhstan)	Maxim Fedin	Tobol	Undisclosed	
14 April 2021	GK	(Russia)	Sergei Revyakin	Unattached	Free	
14 April 2021	MF	(Lithuania)	Artūras Žulpa	Siena	Undisclosed	
5 May 2021	DF	(Kazakhstan)	Yury Logvinenko	Unattached	Free	
9 June 2021	DF	(Russia)	Igor Gubanov	Unattached	Free	
2 July 2021	DF	(Kazakhstan)	Dmitry Shomko	Rotor Volgograd	Undisclosed	
8 July 2021	MF	(Georgia (country))	Zaza Tsitskishvili	Telavi	Undisclosed	
13 July 2021	MF	(Kazakhstan)	Ramazan Orazov	Chayka Peschanokopskoye	Undisclosed	
14 July 2021	DF	(Kazakhstan)	Temirlan Yerlanov	Ordabasy	Undisclosed	
7 August 2021	MF	(Russia)	Nikita Laktionov	Rodina Moscow	Undisclosed	
7 August 2021	FW	(Belarus)	Ihar Zyankovich	Minsk	Undisclosed	
26 August 2021	MF	(Ukraine)	Dmytro Korkishko	Chornomorets Odesa	Undisclosed	
27 August 2021	FW	(Ukraine)	Vitaliy Balashov	Unattached	Free	
30 August 2021	MF	(Ghana)	Joachim Adukor	Sarajevo	Undisclosed	

=== Out ===
Date	Position	Nationality	Name	To	Fee	Ref.
19 July 2021	FW	(Uzbekistan)	Igor Sergeyev	Tobol	Undisclosed	

=== Loans out ===
Date from	Position	Nationality	Name	To	Date to	Ref.
9 April 2021	DF	(Kazakhstan)	Ardak Saulet	Akzhayik	28 July 2021	
14 April 2021	MF	(Kazakhstan)	Esen Zhasanov	Ekibastuz	End of season	

=== Released ===
Date	Position	Nationality	Name	Joined	Date	Ref.
23 June 2021	DF	(Armenia)	Armen Manucharyan	Urartu	18 August 2021	
23 June 2021	DF	(Georgia (country))	Lasha Totadze	Gagra		
3 July 2021	MF	(Russia)	Vitali Volkov			
11 July 2021	FW	(Serbia)	Bojan Dubajić	Enosis Neon		
12 July 2021	DF	(Kazakhstan)	Demiyat Slambekov	Aksu	12 July 2021	
14 July 2021	DF	(Russia)	Igor Gubanov	SKA Rostov-on-Don		

== Competitions ==
=== Overview ===
Competition	First match	Last match	Starting round	Final position	Record							
Competition	First match	Last match	Starting round	Final position	Pld	W	D	L	GF	GA	GD	Win %
Premier League	14 March 2021	30 October 2021	Matchday 1	7th	26	9	6	11	35	40	−5	34.62
Kazakhstan Cup	11 July 2021	14 August 2021	Group Stage	4th	6	0	1	5	5	11	−6	0.00
Total					32	9	7	16	40	51	−11	28.13

Last updated: 30 October 2021
Source: Competitions

=== Premier League ===
==== Results summary ====
Overall								Home						Away					
Pld	W	D	L	GF	GA	GD	Pts	W	D	L	GF	GA	GD	W	D	L	GF	GA	GD
26	9	6	11	35	40	−5	33	3	5	5	14	22	−8	6	1	6	21	18	+3

Last updated: 30 October 2021.
Source: See Results

==== Results by round ====
Round	1	2	3	4	5	6	7	8	9	10	11	12	13	14	15	16	17	18	19	20	21	22	23	24	25	26
Ground	A	H	A	H	A	H	A	A	H	A	H	A	H	A	H	A	H	A	H	H	A	H	A	H	A	H
Result	D	D	W	D	W	L	L	L	L	W	D	L	L	L	W	W	D	L	W	D	L	W	W	L	W	L
Position	13	14	9	9	7	6	8	9	10	9	9	10	11	11	10	10	10	10	10	10	11	8	6	7	6	7

Source: See Results
A = Away; H = Home; W = Win; D = Draw; L = Loss

==== Results ====
14 March 2021 1	Caspiy	1 – 1	Aktobe	Aktau
15:00 (UTC+6)	Karayev (yellow card) 49'; W.Sahli 52' (yellow card) 79'; M.Taykenov (yellow card) 90+2'	Report	Sergeyev (yellow card) 30'; Doumbia (yellow card) 40'; R.Temirkhan (yellow card) 43'; Fedin 61' (pen.); Jeřábek (yellow card) 74'	Stadium: Zhastar Stadium; Attendance: 900; Referee: Alexander Gauser

20 March 2021 2	Aktobe	1 – 1	Tobol	Aktobe
19:00 (UTC+6)	Pertsukh (yellow card) 19'; Sergeyev 54'; A.Azhimov (yellow card) 58'; Manucharyan (yellow card) 72'	Report	Lobjanidze (yellow card) 2'; Valiullin (yellow card) 10' (goal) 71'; Nurgaliev (yellow card) 45'; Tagybergen (yellow card) 51'	Stadium: Central Stadium; Attendance: 0 Referee: Igor Chesnokov
Note: Match played behind closed doors due to the COVID-19 pandemic in Kazakhstan.

3 April 2021 3	Atyrau	1 – 3	Aktobe	Atyrau
16:00 (UTC+6)	R.Ospanov 33' (yellow card) 33'; Junior (yellow card) 61'; Bryan (yellow card) 72'	Report	Fedin 45+1' (pen.); Pertsukh (yellow card) 61'; Moukam 73' (pen.); R.Nurmugamet 82'; Narzikulov (yellow card) 85'	Stadium: Munaishy Stadium; Attendance: 0 Referee: Anton Kuchma
Note: Match played behind closed doors due to the COVID-19 pandemic in Kazakhstan.

9 April 2021 4	Aktobe	4 – 4	Ordabasy	Aktobe
19:00 (UTC+6)	Doumbia (yellow card) 24'; Sergeyev 27'; R.Temirkhan (yellow card) 33'; Nurgaliyev 43'; Totadze (yellow card) 74'; R.Nurmugamet 86'; Jeřábek 90+4'	Report	Yerlanov 12'; João Paulo 36', 74' (pen.); S.Shamshi (yellow card) 39'; Khizhnichenko 90+1'	Stadium: Central Stadium; Attendance: 0 Referee: Sergey Gorokhovodatsky
Note: Match played behind closed doors due to the COVID-19 pandemic in Kazakhstan.

14 April 2021 5	Kyzylzhar	1 – 2	Aktobe	Petropavl
14:00 (UTC+6)	D.Shmidt (yellow card) 30'; A.Saparov (yellow card) 32'; Murachyov (yellow card) 52'; Karshakevich 66'	Report	R.Temirkhan (yellow card) 17'; Totadze (yellow card) 18'; Zhalmukan 90'; Samorodov (yellow card) 90+3'; R.Nurmugamet 90+4'	Stadium: Karasai Stadium; Attendance: 0 Referee: Denis Izmailov
Note: Match played behind closed doors due to the COVID-19 pandemic in Kazakhstan.

19 April 2021 6	Aktobe	0 – 3	Shakhter Karagandy	Aktobe
17:00 (UTC+6)	Doumbia (yellow card) 35'; Dubajić (yellow card) 72'	Report	Khubulov 5', 23' (yellow card) 75'; A.Tattybaev 73'; M.Gabyshev (yellow card) 81'; Najaryan (yellow card) 90+2'	Stadium: Central Stadium; Attendance: 0 Referee: Denis Tevyashov
Note: Match played behind closed doors due to the COVID-19 pandemic in Kazakhstan.

24 April 2021 7	Akzhayik	1 – 0	Aktobe	Oral
16:00 (UTC+6)	I.Antipov 12'; E.Abdrakhmanov (yellow card) 65'	Report	R.Nurmugamet (yellow card) 21'; Zhalmukan (yellow card) 34'; Totadze (yellow card) 54'; Manucharyan (yellow card) 66'; Jeřábek (red card) 78'; A.Azhimov (yellow card) 85'	Stadium: Petr Atoyan Stadium; Attendance: 0 Referee: Aydin Rakhimbaev
Note: Match played behind closed doors due to the COVID-19 pandemic in Kazakhstan.

28 April 2021 8	Taraz	3 – 1	Aktobe	Taraz
18:00 (UTC+6)	Baytana 11'; Eugénio 17' (pen.); Obilor (yellow card) 50'; D.Karaman 55'; A.Taubay (yellow card) 56'	Report	Žulpa (yellow card) 15'; Pertsukh (yellow card) 52'; Sergeyev 76'; A.Tanzharikov (yellow card) 82'; A.Shurigin (yellow card) 84'	Stadium: Central Stadium; Attendance: 1,000; Referee: Sergei Nozhenko

2 May 2021 9	Aktobe	0 – 2	Astana	Aktobe
17:00 (UTC+6)	A.Tanzharikov (yellow card) 24'	Report	Tomasov 9'; Ciupercă 27'; Barseghyan (yellow card) 73'	Stadium: Central Stadium; Attendance: 0 Referee: Igor Chesnokov
Note: Match played behind closed doors due to the COVID-19 pandemic in Kazakhstan.

9 May 2021 10	Zhetysu	1 – 5	Aktobe	Taldıqorğan
16:00 (UTC+6)	Dmitrijev (penalty missed) 6'; R.Atykhanov 6'; P.Ipole (yellow card) 25' (yellow-red card) 29'; Kislitsyn (yellow card) 37'; Kalpachuk (yellow card) 44'; D.Dautov (yellow card) 59'; A.Adil (yellow card) 64'	Report	Manucharyan (red card) 5'; Narzikulov (yellow card) 7'; A.Tanzharikov (yellow card) 7'; Pertsukh 10'; Sergeyev 31', 71', 74'; R.Temirkhan (yellow card) 45'; Dubajić 60'	Stadium: Zhetysu Stadium; Attendance: 0 Referee: Artem Kuchin
Note: Match played behind closed doors due to the COVID-19 pandemic in Kazakhstan.

14 May 2021 11	Aktobe	1 – 1	Kaisar	Aktobe
18:00 (UTC+6)	Sergeyev 43'; Moukam (yellow card) 48'; Pertsukh (yellow card) 65'	Report	Laukžemis 27' (yellow card) 51'; Narzildayev (yellow card) 55'; M.Islamkulov (yellow card) 90+3'	Stadium: Central Stadium; Attendance: 2,000; Referee: Alexander Zatula

18 May 2021 12	Kairat	4 – 2	Aktobe	Almaty
19:00 (UTC+6)	A.Shushenachev 7', 36'; Kanté 51'; Dugalić (yellow card) 73'; Kosović 86'	Report	Manucharyan (yellow card) 15'; A.Tanzharikov (yellow card) 30'; Moukam (yellow card) 40' (goal) 54'; Zhalmukan 41'; Nurgaliyev (yellow card) 52'	Stadium: Central Stadium; Attendance: 4,600; Referee: Bulat Sariev

23 May 2021 13	Aktobe	0 – 2	Turan	Aktobe
21:00 (UTC+6)		Report	S.Maksymkhan 22'; K.Taipov (yellow card) 44'; Nusserbayev 51'	Stadium: Central Stadium; Attendance: 1,900; Referee: Sergey Gorokhovodatsky

29 May 2021 14	Tobol	2 – 1	Aktobe	Kostanay
20:00 (UTC+6)	Nurgaliev 17' (pen.); Miroshnichenko 29'; Nikolić (yellow card) 65'; Manzorro (yellow card) 75'	Report	Samorodov (yellow card) 40'; Totadze (yellow card) 43'; Dubajić 87'	Stadium: Central Stadium; Attendance: 900; Referee: Saken Bayimbet

12 June 2021 15	Aktobe	1 – 0	Atyrau	Aktobe
19:00 (UTC+6)	Fedin (yellow card) 13'; Dubajić 30' (yellow card) 36'; A.Tanzharikov (yellow card) 85'; Revyakin (yellow card) 90+2'	Report	Dashyan (yellow card) 39'; Alex Bruno (yellow card) 85'	Stadium: Central Stadium; Attendance: 5,000; Referee: Aydin Rakhimbaev

18 June 2021 16	Ordabasy	0 – 1	Aktobe	Shymkent
21:00 (UTC+6)	Osuchukwu (yellow card) 26'; Dosmagambetov (yellow card) 40'; Diakate (yellow card) 69'	Report	Jeřábek (yellow card) 48'; Pertsukh (yellow card) 75'; Logvinenko 81'	Stadium: Kazhymukan Munaitpasov Stadium; Attendance: 3,700; Referee: Artem Kuchin

22 June 2021 17	Aktobe	1 – 1	Kyzylzhar	Aktobe
21:00 (UTC+6)	Gubanov (yellow card) 40'; Doumbia (yellow card) 50'; Pertsukh (yellow card) 56'; Moukam (yellow card) 62'; Samorodov (yellow card) 78'; Fedin (yellow card) 80'; Logvinenko 81' (yellow card) 88'	Report	Bushman (yellow card) 21'; N.Dairov (yellow card) 62' (yellow-red card) 79'; Zorić 69'	Stadium: Central Stadium; Attendance: 5,000; Referee: Bulat Sariev

27 June 2021 18	Shakhter Karagandy	1 – 0	Aktobe	Karaganda
19:00 (UTC+6)	Najaryan (yellow card) 25'; Bakayev (yellow card) 60'; Jean-Ali Payruz 67' (yellow card) 68'	Report	R.Nurmugamet (yellow card) 86'	Stadium: Shakhter Stadium; Attendance: 0 Referee: Alisher Azhimov
Note: Match played behind closed doors due to the COVID-19 pandemic in Kazakhstan.

2 July 2021 19	Aktobe	2 – 1	Akzhayik	Aktobe
21:00 (UTC+6)	Samorodov 58', 66'; R.Nurmugamet (yellow card) 88'; Revyakin (yellow card) 90+4'	Report	Kozlov 40'	Stadium: Central Stadium; Attendance: 4,200; Referee: Grigory Moskovchenko

12 September 2021 20	Aktobe	0 – 0	Taraz	Aktobe
18:00 (UTC+6)	Doumbia (yellow card) 90+5'	Report	Baytana (yellow card) 42'; Kódjo (yellow card) 90'; M.Amirkhanov (yellow card) 90+3'; Erivaldo (yellow card) 90+5'	Stadium: Central Stadium; Attendance: 3,285; Referee: Elvira Nurmustafina

18 September 2021 21	Astana	2 – 1	Aktobe	Nur-Sultan
17:00 (UTC+6)	Bećiraj 4'; Tomasov 15'; Kuat (yellow card) 50'	Report	Fedin (penalty missed) 12' (yellow card) 65'; Korkishko 19'; N.Laktionov (yellow card) 57'; Adukor (yellow card) 60'; Yerlanov (yellow card) 60'	Stadium: Astana Arena; Attendance: 2,500; Referee: Alexander Gauser

26 September 2021 22	Aktobe	2 – 0	Zhetysu	Aktobe
18:00 (UTC+6)	Balashov 17'; Moukam 28'; Adukor (yellow card) 45'; Žulpa (yellow card) 70'	Report	Partsvania (yellow card) 30'; Oduenyi (yellow card) 43'; D.Dautov (yellow card) 77'	Stadium: Central Stadium; Attendance: 4,000; Referee: Rustam Omarov

2 October 2021 23	Kaisar	0 – 2	Aktobe	Kyzylorda
20:00 (UTC+6)	Bitang (yellow card) 33'; Laukžemis (yellow card) 79'	Report	Yerlanov 57'; Logvinenko 90+1'	Stadium: Gani Muratbayev Stadium; Attendance: 1,000; Referee: Bulat Sariev

16 October 2021 24	Aktobe	1 – 2	Kairat	Aktobe
19:00 (UTC+6)	Logvinenko (yellow card) 52'; Shomko (yellow card) 59'; Jeřábek (yellow card) 70'; Alip 73' (o.g.)	Report	Shushenachev 31'; Alykulov 41'; Alip (yellow card) 45'; Dugalić (yellow card) 45+1' (yellow-red card) 90+3'; João Paulo (yellow card) 78'	Stadium: Central Stadium; Attendance: 8,200; Referee: Alexander Zatula

24 October 2021 25	Turan	1 – 2	Aktobe	Turkistan
15:00 (UTC+6)	Chizh (yellow card) 2'; T.Amirov 36' (yellow card) 69'; Živković (yellow card) 90+3'	Report	Moukam 18'; R.Temirkhan (yellow card) 62'; Balashov 66'; Žulpa (yellow card) 76'	Stadium: Turkistan Arena; Attendance: 250; Referee: Denis Izmailov

30 October 2021 26	Aktobe	1 – 5	Caspiy	Aktobe
16:00 (UTC+6)	Žulpa (yellow card) 19'; Logvinenko (yellow card) 27'; A.Tanzharikov (red card) 77'; Fedin (yellow card) 81'; Samorodov 85'; R.Temirkhan (yellow card) 90+1'	Report	Stanojević (yellow card) 15'; Darabayev (yellow card) 23' (goal) 33'; N.Ayazbaev (yellow card) 27'; Gavrić 45'; Karimov 50'; Tigroudja 60'; Zaleski 88'	Stadium: Central Stadium; Attendance: 5,700; Referee: Aydin Tasybaev

==== League table ====
Pos	Team	Pld	W	D	L	GF	GA	GD	Pts
5	Ordabasy	26	10	8	8	36	35	+1	38
6	Shakhter Karagandy	26	9	6	11	25	34	−9	33
7	Aktobe	26	9	6	11	35	40	−5	33
8	Caspiy	26	8	8	10	35	35	0	32
9	Akzhayik	26	9	5	12	25	31	−6	32

Source: UEFA, Soccerway
Rules for classification: 1) Points; 2) Goal difference; 3) Matches won; 4) Goals scored; 5) Away goals scored; 6) Head-to-head points; 7) Head-to-head matches won; 8) Head-to-head goal difference; 9) Head-to-head goals scored; 10) Head-to-head away goals scored; 11) Draw.

=== Kazakhstan Cup ===
==== Group stage ====
Pos	Team	Pld	W	D	L	GF	GA	GD	Pts	Qualification
1	Kaisar (A)	6	3	2	1	6	2	+4	11	Advanced to Quarterfinals
2	Astana (A)	6	3	2	1	6	6	0	11	Advanced to Quarterfinals
3	Akzhayik	6	3	1	2	7	5	+2	10	
4	Aktobe	6	0	1	5	5	11	−6	1	

Updated to match(es) played on 15 August 2021. Source: PFLK
(A) Advance to a further round

11 July 2021 1	Aktobe	0 – 2	Akzhayik	Aktobe
19:00 (UTC+6)	Doumbia (yellow card) 58'; A.Saulet (yellow card) 59'; Žulpa (yellow card) 62'; A.Tanzharikov (yellow card) 68'; Sergeyev (penalty missed) 75'	Report	Kozlov (penalty missed) 40' 40', 77'; Sicaci (yellow card) 87'	Stadium: Central Stadium; Attendance: 2,200; Referee: Saken Bayimbet

16 July 2021 2	Astana	3 – 2	Aktobe	Nur-Sultan
19:00 (UTC+6)	Tomasov 13'; A.Tanzharikov 48' (o.g.); Ebong (yellow card) 57'; Beisebekov (yellow card) 63'; Barseghyan 71'	Report	Žulpa (yellow card) 29'; A.Tanzharikov (yellow card) 30'; Chernyshov 45'; Orazov (yellow card) 53'; D.Kashken (yellow card) 73'; Logvinenko 80'; A.Azhimov (yellow card) 90'	Stadium: Astana Arena; Attendance: 2,000; Referee: Sergey Nozhenko

24 July 2021 3	Aktobe	1 – 2	Kaisar	Aktobe
21:00 (UTC+6)	Logvinenko (yellow card) 20'; Orazov (yellow card) 36'; Shomko (yellow card) 61'; Jeřábek (yellow card) 71' (goal) 90+6'	Report	Denković (penalty missed) 21' 84'; Čađenović (yellow card) 45'; Potapov 69'; Narzildayev (yellow card) 73'	Stadium: Central Stadium; Attendance: 2,485; Referee: Sayat Karabayev

31 July 2021 4	Kaisar	1 – 0	Aktobe	Kyzylorda
22:00 (UTC+6)	Bayzhanov (yellow card) 17'; Narzildayev (yellow card) 36'; Laukžemis 46'	Report		Stadium: Gani Muratbayev Stadium; Attendance: 1,200; Referee: Mikhail Bildinov

7 August 2021 5	Akzhayik	2 – 1	Aktobe	Oral
19:00 (UTC+6)	Kovtalyuk 3' (yellow card) 43'; Gashchenkov (yellow card) 41'; I.Antipov 53' (yellow card) 79'	Report	Logvinenko (yellow card) 43'; Jeřábek (yellow card) 61'; Yerlanov 78'; A.Tanzharikov (yellow card) 80'	Stadium: Petr Atoyan Stadium; Attendance: 1,500; Referee: Nikita Utrobin

14 August 2021 6	Aktobe	1 – 1	Astana	Aktobe
18:00 (UTC+6)	Samorodov 15' (yellow card) 19'; Orazov (yellow card) 25'; A.Tanzharikov (yellow card) 25'; Chernyshov (yellow card) 52'	Report	Ciupercă (yellow card) 13'; Tomasov 85'	Stadium: Central Stadium; Attendance: 0 Referee: Sergey Gorokhovodatsky
Note: Match played behind closed doors due to the COVID-19 pandemic in Kazakhstan.

== Squad statistics ==
As of match played 30 October 2021

=== Appearances and goals ===
No.	Pos	Nat	Player	Total		Premier League		Kazakhstan Cup	
No.	Pos	Nat	Player	Apps	Goals	Apps	Goals	Apps	Goals
1	GK	(Kazakhstan) KAZ	Zhasur Narzikulov	21	0	19	0	2	0
2	DF	(Kazakhstan) KAZ	Dinmukhamed Kashken	11	0	5+3	0	2+1	0
6	DF	(Kazakhstan) KAZ	Rustam Temirkhan	15	0	13+1	0	1	0
7	MF	(Russia) RUS	Oleg Chernyshov	22	1	8+9	0	4+1	1
10	MF	(Kazakhstan) KAZ	Maksim Samorodov	27	4	5+16	3	5+1	1
12	DF	(Kazakhstan) KAZ	Alisher Azhimov	10	0	6+1	0	0+3	0
14	MF	(Kazakhstan) KAZ	Yury Pertsukh	22	1	15+3	1	3+1	0
16	GK	(Russia) RUS	Sergei Revyakin	11	0	7	0	4	0
18	DF	(Czech Republic) CZE	Michal Jeřábek	27	2	21+1	1	5	1
19	DF	(Kazakhstan) KAZ	Ardak Saulet	5	0	0+2	0	3	0
20	MF	(Kazakhstan) KAZ	Yerkebulan Nurgaliyev	15	1	6+7	1	0+2	0
23	MF	(Kazakhstan) KAZ	Rifat Nurmugamet	17	3	3+11	3	0+3	0
25	GK	(Kazakhstan) KAZ	Evgeniy Sitdikov	1	0	0+1	0	0	0
26	MF	(Kazakhstan) KAZ	Ramazan Orazov	10	0	6	0	4	0
27	DF	(Kazakhstan) KAZ	Yury Logvinenko	18	4	10+3	3	4+1	1
29	MF	(Georgia (country)) GEO	Zaza Tsitskishvili	5	0	0	0	3+2	0
31	DF	(Kazakhstan) KAZ	Adilkhan Tanzharikov	19	0	14	0	5	0
33	FW	(Belarus) BLR	Ihar Zyankovich	6	0	1+3	0	1+1	0
39	MF	(Russia) RUS	Nikita Laktionov	3	0	0+1	0	0+2	0
44	MF	(Lithuania) LTU	Artūras Žulpa	17	0	11+1	0	5	0
50	MF	(Ghana) GHA	Joachim Adukor	6	0	6	0	0	0
70	MF	(Ukraine) UKR	Dmytro Korkishko	6	1	4+2	1	0	0
73	MF	(Kazakhstan) KAZ	Didar Zhalmukan	26	2	12+10	2	1+3	0
77	DF	(Kazakhstan) KAZ	Dmitry Shomko	8	0	5+1	0	0+2	0
80	DF	(Kazakhstan) KAZ	Temirlan Yerlanov	11	2	6	1	4+1	1
88	MF	(Kazakhstan) KAZ	Anton Shurigin	5	0	2+2	0	1	0
91	FW	(Ukraine) UKR	Vitaliy Balashov	7	2	7	2	0	0
93	MF	(Mali) MLI	Tongo Doumbia	22	0	19	0	3	0
94	MF	(Cameroon) CMR	Hervaine Moukam	28	4	18+7	4	3	0
96	MF	(Kazakhstan) KAZ	Maxim Fedin	28	2	17+7	2	3+1	0
Players away from Aktobe on loan:
Players who left Aktobe during the season:
3	DF	(Georgia (country)) GEO	Lasha Totadze	9	0	6+3	0	0	0
4	DF	(Kazakhstan) KAZ	Demiyat Slambekov	5	0	0+5	0	0	0
5	DF	(Armenia) ARM	Armen Manucharyan	11	0	11	0	0	0
9	FW	(Serbia) SRB	Bojan Dubajić	15	3	6+9	3	0	0
11	FW	(Uzbekistan) UZB	Igor Sergeyev	20	7	15+3	7	0+2	0
22	MF	(Russia) RUS	Vitali Volkov	4	0	0+4	0	0	0
66	DF	(Russia) RUS	Igor Gubanov	5	0	2+3	0	0	0

=== Goal scorers ===
Place	Position	Nation	Number	Name	Premier League	Kazakhstan Cup	Total
1	FW	(Uzbekistan)	11	Igor Sergeyev	7	0	7
2	MF	(Cameroon)	94	Hervaine Moukam	4	0	4
2	DF	(Kazakhstan)	27	Yury Logvinenko	3	1	4
2	MF	(Kazakhstan)	10	Maksim Samorodov	3	1	4
5	MF	(Kazakhstan)	23	Rifat Nurmugamet	3	0	3
5	FW	(Serbia)	9	Bojan Dubajić	3	0	3
7	MF	(Kazakhstan)	96	Maxim Fedin	2	0	2
7	MF	(Kazakhstan)	73	Didar Zhalmukan	2	0	2
7	FW	(Ukraine)	91	Vitaliy Balashov	2	0	2
7	DF	(Czech Republic)	16	Michal Jeřábek	1	1	2
7	DF	(Kazakhstan)	80	Temirlan Yerlanov	1	1	2
12	MF	(Kazakhstan)	20	Yerkebulan Nurgaliyev	1	0	1
12	MF	(Kazakhstan)	14	Yury Pertsukh	1	0	1
12	MF	(Ukraine)	70	Dmytro Korkishko	1	0	1
12				Own goal	1	0	1
12	MF	(Russia)	7	Oleg Chernyshov	0	1	1
				TOTALS	35	5	40

=== Clean sheets ===
Place	Position	Nation	Number	Name	Premier League	Kazakhstan Cup	Total
1	GK	(Kazakhstan)	1	Zhasur Narzikulov	3	0	3
2	GK	(Russia)	16	Sergei Revyakin	2	0	2
				TOTALS	5	0	5

=== Disciplinary record ===
Number	Nation	Position	Name	Premier League		Kazakhstan Cup		Total	
Number	Nation	Position	Name	Booked	Sent off (straight red)	Booked	Sent off (straight red)	Booked	Sent off (straight red)
1	(Kazakhstan)	GK	Zhasur Narzikulov	2	0	0	0	2	0
2	(Kazakhstan)	DF	Dinmukhamed Kashken	0	0	1	0	1	0
6	(Kazakhstan)	DF	Rustam Temirkhan	6	0	0	0	6	0
7	(Russia)	MF	Oleg Chernyshov	0	0	1	0	1	0
10	(Kazakhstan)	MF	Maksim Samorodov	3	0	1	0	4	0
12	(Kazakhstan)	DF	Alisher Azhimov	2	0	1	0	3	0
14	(Kazakhstan)	MF	Yury Pertsukh	6	0	0	0	6	0
16	(Russia)	GK	Sergei Revyakin	2	0	0	0	2	0
18	(Czech Republic)	DF	Michal Jeřábek	3	1	2	0	5	1
20	(Kazakhstan)	MF	Yerkebulan Nurgaliyev	1	0	0	0	1	0
23	(Kazakhstan)	MF	Rifat Nurmugamet	3	0	0	0	3	0
26	(Kazakhstan)	MF	Ramazan Orazov	0	0	3	0	3	0
27	(Kazakhstan)	DF	Yury Logvinenko	3	0	2	0	5	0
31	(Kazakhstan)	DF	Adilkhan Tanzharikov	5	1	4	0	9	1
39	(Russia)	MF	Nikita Laktionov	1	0	0	0	1	0
44	(Lithuania)	MF	Artūras Žulpa	4	0	2	0	6	0
50	(Ghana)	MF	Joachim Adukor	2	0	0	0	2	0
73	(Kazakhstan)	MF	Didar Zhalmukan	1	0	0	0	1	0
77	(Kazakhstan)	DF	Dmitry Shomko	1	0	1	0	2	0
80	(Kazakhstan)	DF	Temirlan Yerlanov	2	0	0	0	2	0
88	(Kazakhstan)	MF	Anton Shurigin	1	0	0	0	1	0
93	(Mali)	MF	Tongo Doumbia	5	0	1	0	6	0
94	(Cameroon)	MF	Hervaine Moukam	3	0	0	0	3	0
96	(Kazakhstan)	MF	Maxim Fedin	4	0	0	0	4	0
Players who left Aktobe during the season:
3	(Georgia (country))	DF	Lasha Totadze	4	0	0	0	4	0
5	(Armenia)	DF	Armen Manucharyan	3	1	0	0	3	1
9	(Serbia)	FW	Bojan Dubajić	2	0	0	0	2	0
11	(Uzbekistan)	FW	Igor Sergeyev	1	0	0	0	1	0
66	(Russia)	DF	Igor Gubanov	1	0	0	0	1	0
			TOTALS	72	3	19	0	91	3
