= Kushnirov =

Kushnirov, feminine: Kushnirova is a surname. Notable people with the surname include:

- Denys Kushnirov, Ukrainian sport shooter
- Dmytro Kushnirov, Ukrainian footballer
