= Ximo Forner =

Spanish footballer

Personal information
- Full name: Joaquín Forner Martín de Ojeda
- Date of birth: 27 January 1990 (age 36)
- Place of birth: Almenara, Spain
- Height: 1.80 m (5 ft 11 in)
- Position: Midfielder

Team information
- Current team: Vall de Uxó

Youth career
- 1999–2005: Villarreal
- 2005–2008: Valencia

Senior career*
| Years | Team | Apps | (Gls) |
| 2006–2013 | Valencia B | 67 | (0) |
| 2010–2010 | → Alcoyano (loan) | 19 | (1) |
| 2011–2012 | → Poli Ejido (loan) | 19 | (2) |
| 2012 | → Linense (loan) | 14 | (1) |
| 2013–2014 | Castellón | 30 | (2) |
| 2014 | AEL | 2 | (0) |
| 2015–2016 | Linense | 37 | (0) |
| 2016–2018 | Castellón | 62 | (3) |
| 2018–2023 | Atlético Saguntino | 129 | (13) |
| 2023– | Vall de Uxó | 6 | (0) |
- * Club domestic league appearances and goals as of 13 October 2024

Joaquín 'Ximo' Forner Martín de Ojeda (born 27 January 1990) is a Spanish professional footballer who plays for Vall de Uxó as a midfielder.

== International career ==
Forner was a member of the Spanish squad in the 2007 UEFA European Under-17 Football Championship.
