= Abdelhamid El Kaoutari =

Moroccan footballer (born 1990)

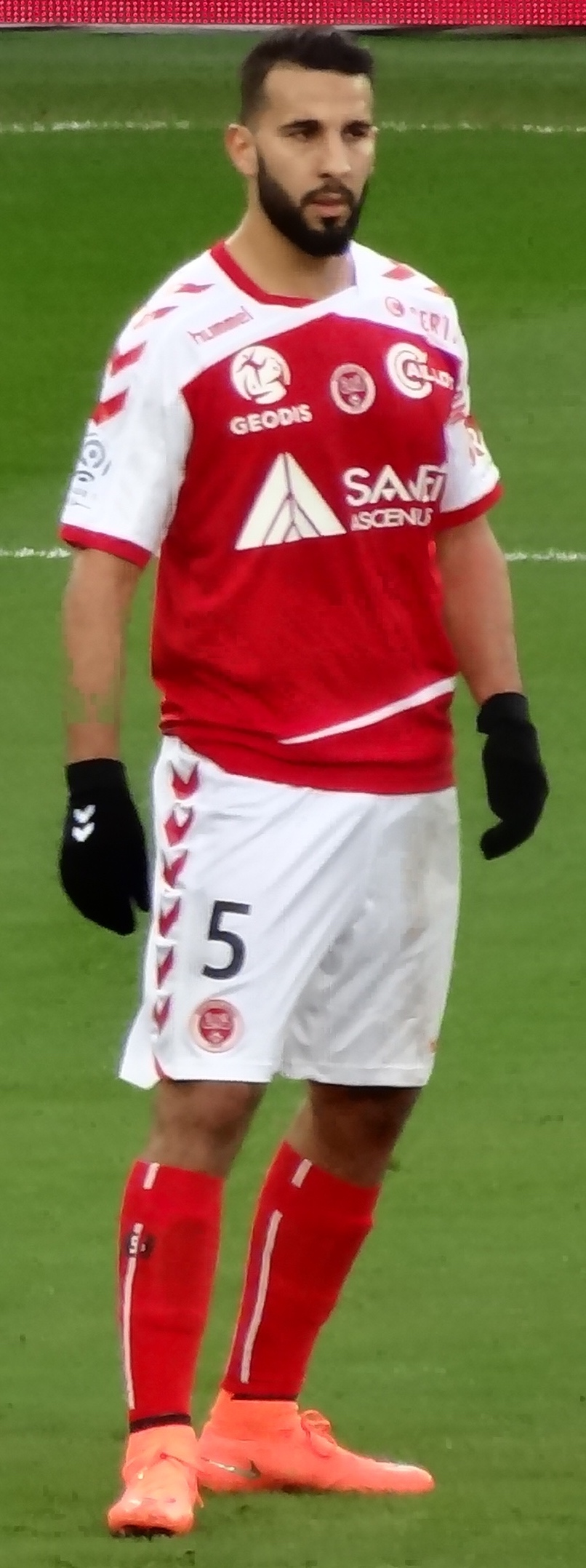
- El Kaoutari with Reims in 2016

Personal information
- Date of birth: 17 March 1990 (age 36)
- Place of birth: Montpellier, France
- Height: 1.80 m (5 ft 11 in)
- Position: Centre-back

Youth career
- 1998–2000: AS Grand
- 2000–2008: Montpellier

Senior career*
Years	Team	Apps	(Gls)
2008–2015	Montpellier	150	(1)
2012	Montpellier B	2	(0)
2015–2018	Palermo	7	(1)
2016	→ Reims (loan)	8	(0)
2016–2017	→ Bastia (loan)	18	(0)
2018	Wydad AC	4	(0)
2019–2022	Nancy	73	(0)

International career
2008–2009	France U19	6	(0)
2012	Morocco U23	2	(0)
2011–2018	Morocco	13	(0)
- * Club domestic league appearances and goals as of 5 June 2024

Abdelhamid El Kaoutari (Arabic: عبد الحميد الكوثري; born 17 March 1990) is a professional footballer who plays as a centre-back.

== Early life ==
El Kaoutari was born in Montpellier and played for his hometown club since childhood, having joined as a youth player. While in the club's youth academy, known as Centre de Formation de La Paillade, he helped the Montpellier 18 ans team win the 2008–09 edition of the Coupe Gambardella. After successfully passing through La Paillade, El Kaoutari was allowed to train with the senior team alongside fellow youth teammate Mickaël Nelson.

== Early career ==
He made his professional debut on 12 May 2008 in a Ligue 2 match against Gueugnon. El Kaoutari appeared as a substitute in the 65th minute. Montpellier won the match 2–1.

For the 2008–09 season, El Kaoutari featured regularly in the Coupe Gambardella and the Coupe de France. He started both Montpellier's Coupe de France victories over amateur club Saint-Flour and third-tier club Cannes. Both matches went into extra time. El Kaoutari also appeared in four league matches, which included three straight matches late in the season, while Montpellier were in the midst of a promotion battle. Montpellier did, indeed, achieve promotion to Ligue 1. El Kaoutari was given a more prominent role in the squad for the 2009–10 Ligue 1 season. After appearing early on as a substitute, by November, El Kaoutari became a staple in the starting 11, usually starting in the left-back position.

In July 2015, he moved to Italian Serie A club Palermo, when he signed a four-year contract.

On 1 February 2016, El Kaoutari signed a six-month loan deal with Ligue 1 club Reims.

In January 2019, he left Wydad AC for AS Nancy.

== International career ==
El Kaoutari played for the France under-19 team. He was a late addition to the team making his debut during the Elite Round portion of qualification for the 2009 UEFA European Under-19 Football Championship. He was later selected to play in the tournament and featured in all four matches with France suffering elimination in the semi-finals losing 3–1 to England.

El Kaoutari played his first match for Morocco on 4 June 2011 against Algeria (4–0). He was named in Pim Verbeek's 18-man squad for the Morocco U-23 football team to compete at the London 2012 Olympics.

== Honours ==
Montpellier

- Ligue 1: 2011–12
