= Matej Rapnik =

Slovenian footballer (born 1990)

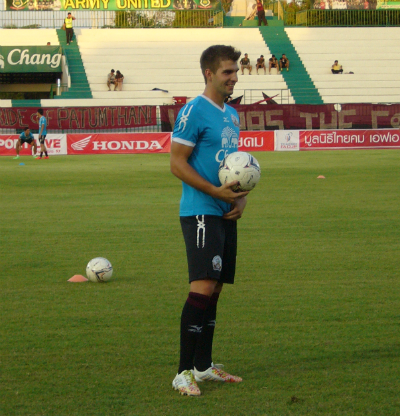

Personal information
- Date of birth: 24 February 1990 (age 36)
- Place of birth: Slovenj Gradec, SFR Yugoslavia
- Height: 1.90 m (6 ft 3 in)
- Position: Defender

Youth career
- 2000: MNK Fužinar
- 2000–2003: Korotan
- 2003–2007: Dravograd
- 2007: Bravo
- 2007–2009: Heart of Midlothian

Senior career*
Years	Team	Apps	(Gls)
2009–2012	Interblock	60	(7)
2012	Celje	5	(0)
2013–2015	Muangthong United	0	(0)
2013	→ Nakhon Nayok (loan)		
2013–2014	→ Police United (loan)	9	(0)
2015–2019	Dravograd		

International career
2006–2007	Slovenia U17	6	(0)
2007–2008	Slovenia U18	11	(4)
2008–2009	Slovenia U19	6	(0)
2008–2009	Slovenia U20	2	(0)
2010–2012	Slovenia U21	2	(0)
- * Club domestic league appearances and goals

Matej Rapnik (born 24 February 1990) is a Slovenian retired footballer who played as a defender. He captained Slovenia from under-15 level up to under-19 level and played for the under-21s.

== Club career ==
In July 2007, Rapnik signed for Scottish Premier League side Heart of Midlothian where he made the bench on several occasions but never made a first team appearance. On 30 January 2009 it was revealed that he had left Hearts to return to Slovenia.

On 9 February 2009 Rapnik joined Interblock in his home town of Ljubljana on a three-year contract. He made his debut against Koper on 21 February 2009 and scored his first goal a week later against Rudar Velenje in a 2–1 defeat. However, he could not help his new team to better than a ninth-place finish in the Slovenian PrvaLiga, which meant they had to face a relegation play-off. They were beaten 4–0 on aggregate by Triglav Kranj and were consigned to the Slovenian Second League for the 2010–11 season. After the 2011–12 season Interblock merged with Rapnik's former club NK Bravo to become Bravo1 Interblock and began to field only youth teams and therefore no longer had a senior squad, leading to Rapnik's departure after 67 appearances and seven goals in all competitions.

On 24 August 2012, Slovenian PrvaLiga club Celje announced that they had signed Rapnik. He made his competitive debut on 16 September 2012 in a 1–0 away defeat to Koper.

== International career ==
Rapnik has represented and captained his country at several youth levels, including under-19s. He featured in all three of their games as they finished bottom of their group at the 2009 UEFA European Under-19 Football Championship in Ukraine, which included a 7–1 defeat against England. He was a member of the under-21 team, having made his debut in a 2–1 defeat to Croatia on 16 November 2010.

== Honours ==
Interblock

- Slovenian Cup: 2008–09
