= Zakhidnyi Stadium =

Multi-purpose stadium in Mariupol, Ukraine

Coordinates: 47°07′13″N 37°30′55″E

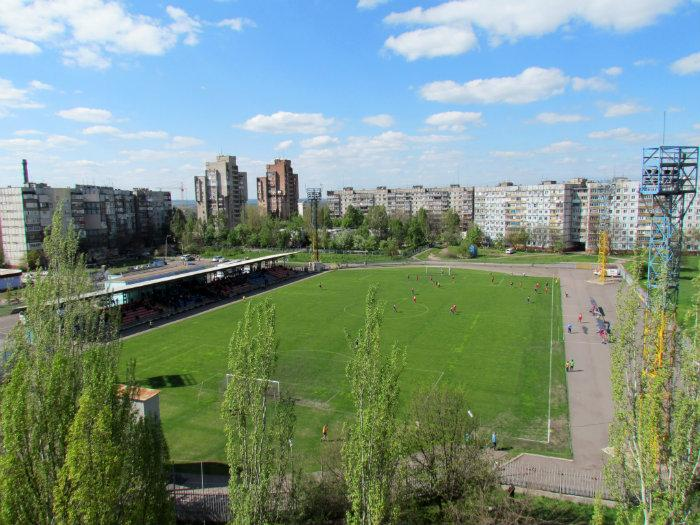
- Interactive map of Zakhidnyi Stadium
- Location: Mariupol, Ukraine
- Capacity: 3,206
- Surface: Grass
- Field size: 105m x 68m

Construction
- Opened: 2005
- Renovated: 2009

Tenants
- Illichivets-2 Mariupol (2005–2022); FC Feniks-Mariupol

Zakhidnyi Stadium (Ukrainian: Стадіон «Західний», lit. 'Western Stadium') is a multi-purpose stadium in Mariupol, Ukraine. It has been mostly used for football matches, and was the home of youth squad of Illichivets (Illichivets-2 Mariupol). The stadium holds 3,206 spectators. The stadium was used in 2009 UEFA European Under-19 Football Championship.
