= Alexandre Pasche =

Swiss footballer (born 1991)

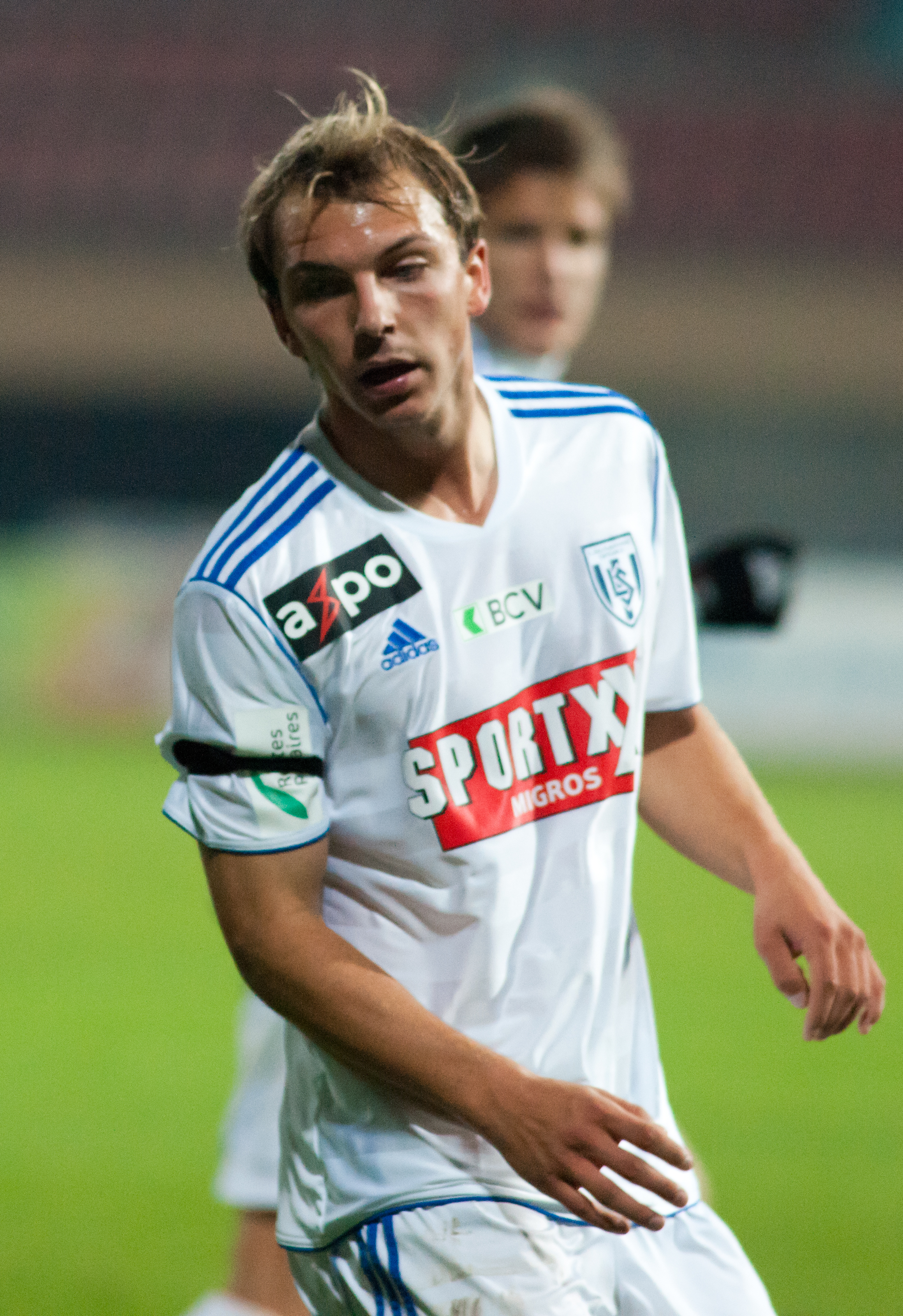
- Pasche in 2011

Personal information
- Date of birth: 31 May 1991 (age 35)
- Place of birth: Lausanne, Switzerland
- Height: 1.74 m (5 ft 9 in)
- Position: Midfielder

Team information
- Current team: Baden
- Number: 24

Youth career
- 1998–2002: Cugy
- 2002–2006: Lausanne-Sport

Senior career*
| Years | Team | Apps | (Gls) |
| 2006–2009 | Lausanne-Sport | 47 | (4) |
| 2009–2012 | Young Boys | 10 | (0) |
| 2009–2010 | Young Boys II | 7 | (0) |
| 2010–2012 | → Lausanne-Sport (loan) | 49 | (1) |
| 2011 | → Lausanne-Sport II (loan) | 2 | (0) |
| 2012–2015 | Servette | 97 | (6) |
| 2014 | Servette II | 1 | (0) |
| 2015–2020 | Lausanne-Sport | 128 | (10) |
| 2020–2023 | Neuchâtel Xamax | 35 | (2) |
| 2023 | Neuchâtel Xamax II | 1 | (0) |
| 2023– | Baden | 17 | (0) |

International career^{‡}
| 2007–2008 | Switzerland U17 | 10 | (0) |
| 2008–2010 | Switzerland U19 | 24 | (7) |
- * Club domestic league appearances and goals as of 28 May 2024 ‡ National team caps and goals as of 11 April 2012

Alexandre Pasche (born 31 May 1991) is a Swiss professional footballer who plays as a midfielder for Baden.

== Club career ==
Pasche played for Lausanne-Sport, his local club, from 2002 to 2009, when he moved on to Young Boys. He failed to make an impact at Young Boys, and was sent back to Lausanne-Sport on loan for the 2010–11 and 2011–12 seasons. On 20 June 2012, it was announced that Pasche had signed a three-year contract with Servette although he was still on loan from Young Boys.

On 8 July 2023, Pasche signed with Baden.

== International career ==
He represented Switzerland at the 2008 UEFA European Under-17 Football Championship and 2009 UEFA European Under-19 Football Championship.
