= Bojan Dubajić =

Serbian footballer

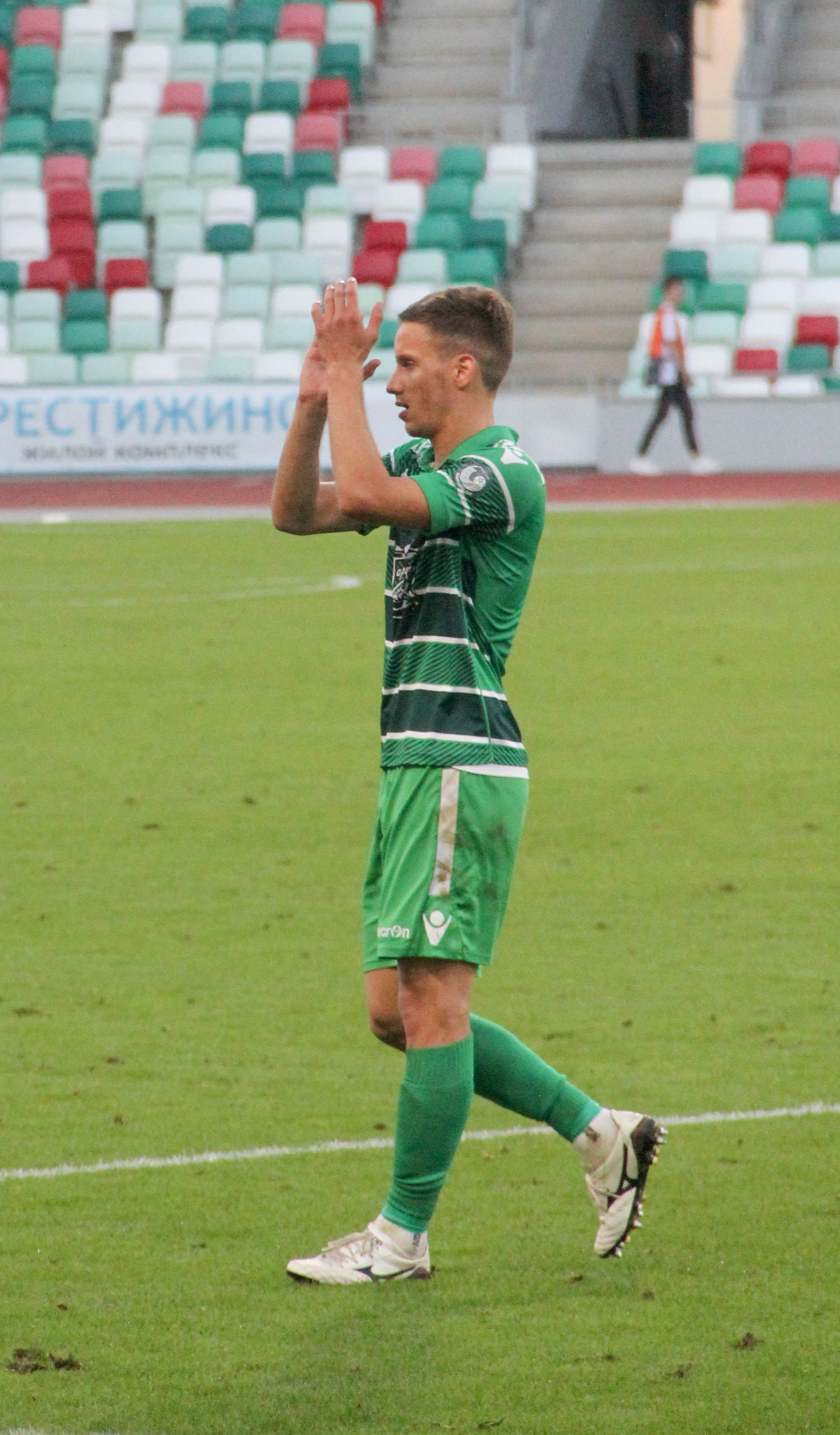

Personal information
- Date of birth: 1 September 1990 (age 36)
- Place of birth: Novi Sad, SFR Yugoslavia
- Height: 1.83 m (6 ft 0 in)
- Position: Forward

Senior career*
Years	Team	Apps	(Gls)
2007–2013	Inđija	78	(15)
2010	→ Radnički Sombor (loan)	29	(3)
2013–2015	Lugano	32	(7)
2015	→ Le Mont (loan)	16	(6)
2015–2016	Le Mont	28	(5)
2016	Sisaket	9	(0)
2017–2018	Gorodeya	45	(22)
2019–2020	BATE Borisov	29	(7)
2021	Aktobe	15	(3)
2021–2022	EN Paralimni	0	(0)
- * Club domestic league appearances and goals as of 12 July 2022

Bojan Dubajić (Serbian Cyrillic: Бојан Дубајић; born 1 September 1990) is a Serbian retired footballer.

== Career ==
On 7 January 2021, Kazakhstan Premier League club Aktobe announced the signing of Dubajić. Six months later, after 15 appearances and 3 goals, Dubajić left Aktobe.
