= Moisés Jiménez Sánchez =

Mexican politician

- Born: 24 December 1960 (age 65); Hidalgo, Mexico
- Occupation: Politician
- Political party: PANAL

Moisés Jiménez Sánchez (born 24 December 1960) is a Mexican politician affiliated with the New Alliance Party. He served as Deputy of the LIX Legislature of the Mexican Congress representing Hidalgo (as an independent).
