= Anthony Bentem =

Dutch footballer (born 1990)

Personal information
- Date of birth: 19 March 1990 (age 36)
- Place of birth: Rotterdam, Netherlands
- Height: 1.82 m (5 ft 11 1/2 in)
- Position: Rightback

Youth career
- VOB
- 2000–2009: Sparta

Senior career*
Years	Team	Apps	(Gls)
2009–2012	Sparta	20	(1)
2012–2014	XerxesDZB		
2014–2018	Quick Boys		
2018–2022	Spijkenisse		

International career
2006–2007	Netherlands U17	12	(1)
2011	Netherlands U21	1	(0)
- * Club domestic league appearances and goals as of 10:13, 20 October 2012 (UTC)

Anthony Bentem (born 19 March 1990) is a Dutch footballer.

== Club career ==
Bentem played professionally for hometown club Sparta. He left the club after 12 years when his contract expired and moved to amateur outfit XerxesDZB in 2012. In summer 2014 he joined Quick Boys and he later played for Spijkenisse.
