= Mickaël Nelson =

French footballer (born 1990)

Personal information
- Full name: Mickaël Nelson
- Date of birth: 2 February 1990 (age 36)
- Place of birth: Marseille, France
- Height: 6 ft 1 in (1.85 m)
- Position: Defender

Team information
- Current team: Agde

Youth career
- 1997–2004: Sport Club Caillols
- 2004–2008: Montpellier

Senior career*
Years	Team	Apps	(Gls)
2008–2011	Montpellier	1	(0)
2011–2012	SV Babelsberg 03	18	(1)
2012–2016	FC Sete	67	(1)
2016–2017	Paulhan-Pézenas	28	(0)
2017–	Agde	0	(0)

International career
2008–2009	France U19	10	(0)
- * Club domestic league appearances and goals as of 6 July 2017 (UTC)

Mickaël Nelson (born 2 February 1990) is a French footballer who plays for Agde. His family hails from the island of Réunion.

== Football career ==
In January 2008, Montpellier and Nelson agreed to a professional contract. He was given the number 13 shirt. He made his professional football debut on 12 May 2008 in a Ligue 2 match with Montpellier against FC Gueugnon coming on as a substitute in the 78th minute. Montpellier would win the match 2–1 with a late goal from Mapou Yanga-Mbiwa. He captained the Montpellier U-18 squad that won the 2008–09 Coupe Gambardella and the coveted Swan d'Or.

He has spent time on trial at Portsmouth FC and Standard Liège and signed for SV Babelsberg 03 in 2011. He was released by the Potsdam club after one season.

== International career ==
Nelson played on the France U-19 squad. He made his debut participating in the opening match of the 2008 Sendaï Cup. He participated in the 2009 UEFA European Under-19 Football Championship with the under-19 team. He played in all four of the squad's matches including the semi-final, where they suffered elimination losing 1–3 in extra time to England.
