= Michal Jeřábek =

Czech footballer (born 1993)

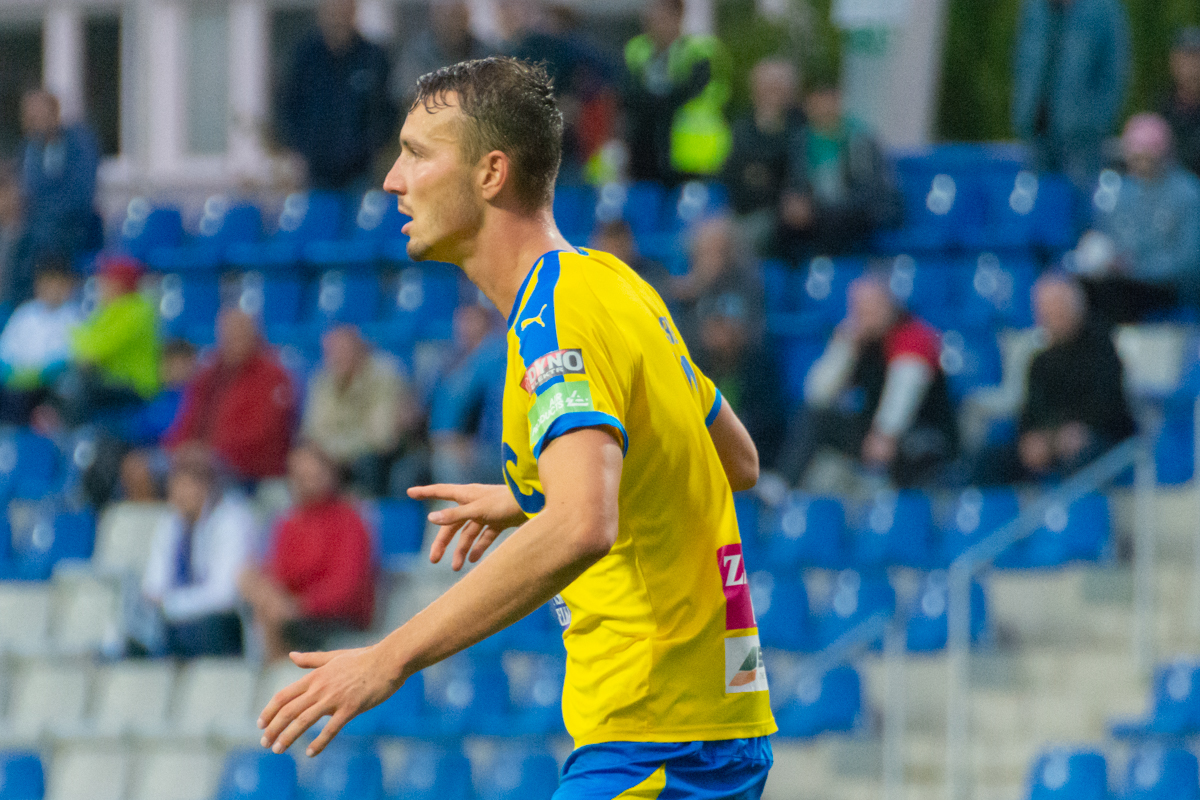

Personal information
- Date of birth: 10 September 1993 (age 33)
- Place of birth: Czech Republic
- Height: 1.88 m (6 ft 2 in)
- Position: Centre back

Team information
- Current team: Kelantan Darul Naim
- Number: 18

Youth career
- Dukla Prague

Senior career*
Years	Team	Apps	(Gls)
2014–2016	Dukla Prague	35	(0)
2016–2020	Teplice	92	(5)
2020–2021	Jablonec	14	(1)
2021	Aktobe	22	(1)
2022	Michalovce	17	(1)
2023	Trinity Zlín	0	(0)
2023–2024	Michalovce	4	(0)
2024–	Kelantan Darul Naim	13	(0)

International career
2013	Czech Republic U21	1	(0)
- * Club domestic league appearances and goals as of 4 December 2024

Michal Jeřábek (born 10 September 1993) is a Czech professional footballer who plays as a centre-back for Malaysian club Kelantan Darul Naim.

== Club career ==
Having played 35 games for Dukla Prague, Jeřábek signed for Teplice in January 2016. On 8 January 2023, he joined Trinity Zlín.
