= Hervaine Moukam =

French footballer (born 1994)

Personal information
- Full name: Hervaine Ferdin Moukam Mekontso
- Date of birth: 24 May 1994 (age 32)
- Place of birth: Manjo, Cameroon
- Height: 1.66 m (5 ft 5 in)
- Position: Midfielder

Team information
- Current team: Schifflange 95
- Number: 12

Youth career
- 2010–2012: Metz

Senior career*
Years	Team	Apps	(Gls)
2012–2014	Metz B	59	(8)
2014–2016	Asteras Tripolis	15	(0)
2016–2017	Olympiacos Volos		
2017–2018	Amnéville	13	(0)
2018	Neman Grodno	15	(3)
2018–2020	BATE Borisov	42	(3)
2021	Aktobe	25	(4)
2022	Qingdao Youth Island	16	(2)
2023	APM Metz		
2023–2024	US Rumelange	37	(17)
2025–	Schifflange 95		
- * Club domestic league appearances and goals as of 31 December 2024

Hervaine Moukam (born 24 May 1994) is a French professional footballer who plays for Schifflange 95.

== Career ==
=== Club ===
On 8 January 2021, Moukam signed for FC Aktobe.
