= Ihor Levchenko =

Ukrainian footballer

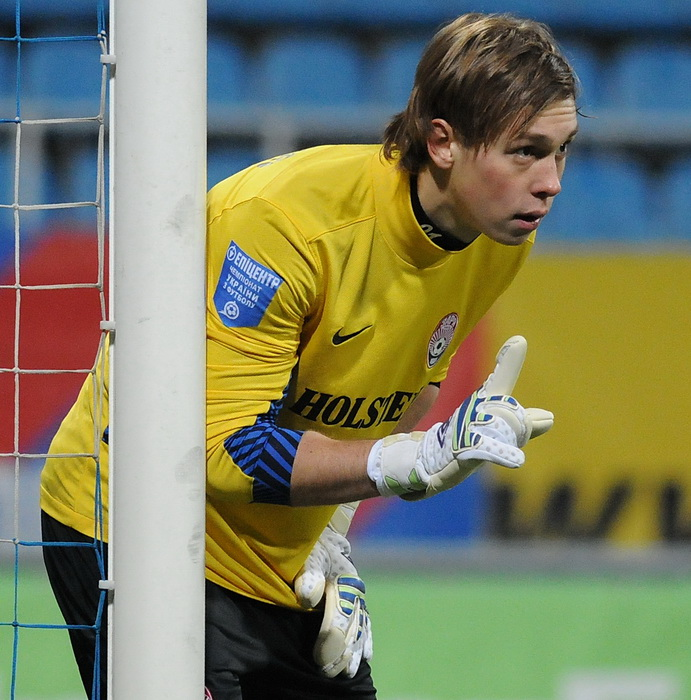

Personal information
- Full name: Ihor Oleksandrovych Levchenko
- Date of birth: 23 February 1991 (age 35)
- Place of birth: Donetsk, Ukrainian SSR, Soviet Union
- Height: 1.90 m (6 ft 3 in)
- Position: Goalkeeper

Team information
- Current team: Khust
- Number: 1

Youth career
- 2004–2007: Olimpik Donetsk

Senior career*
Years	Team	Apps	(Gls)
2007–2014	Olimpik Donetsk	49	(0)
2010	→ Metalurh Zaporizhia (loan)	0	(0)
2011–2013	→ Zorya Luhansk (loan)	2	(0)
2014–2017	Zorya Luhansk	10	(0)
2017–2018	Mariupol	1	(0)
2018	IFK Mariehamn	15	(0)
2019	AFC Eskilstuna	16	(0)
2020	Dinamo Batumi	2	(0)
2021–2023	Metalurh Zaporizhzhia	0	(0)
2023–	Khust	19	(0)

International career
2007	Ukraine U16	2	(0)
2007–2008	Ukraine U17	7	(0)
2008–2009	Ukraine U18	9	(0)
2009–2010	Ukraine U19	16	(0)
2010	Ukraine U20	2	(0)
Medal record
Men's football
Representing Ukraine
UEFA European Under-19 Championship
Winner	2009 Ukraine
- * Club domestic league appearances and goals as of 20 June 2024

Ihor Levchenko (Ukrainian: Ігор Олександрович Левченко; born 23 February 1991) is a Ukrainian professional footballer who plays as a goalkeeper for Khust.

== Career ==
Levchenko left IFK Mariehamn at the end of 2018. Levchenko signed for AFC Eskilstuna in March, 2019. Released from his contract in December 2019, Levchenko signed for Dinamo Batumi in January 2020.

== Honours ==
2009 UEFA European Under-19 Football Championship: Champion
