= Oleg Chernyshov =

Russian football player (born 1986)

Personal information
- Full name: Oleg Vladimirovich Chernyshov
- Date of birth: 23 December 1986 (age 39)
- Place of birth: Bugulma, Tatarstan, Russian SFSR
- Height: 1.73 m (5 ft 8 in)
- Positions: Defender; midfielder

Youth career
- DYuSSh-2 Bugulma

Senior career*
| Years | Team | Apps | (Gls) |
| 2006 | Rubin-2 Kazan | 10 | (0) |
| 2007 | Neftyanik Bugulma (amateur) | | |
| 2008–2009 | Neftekhimik Nizhnekamsk | 64 | (10) |
| 2010 | Bashinformsvyaz-Dynamo Ufa | 26 | (4) |
| 2011–2013 | Zvezda Ryazan | 66 | (8) |
| 2013–2014 | Vityaz Podolsk | 29 | (4) |
| 2014–2020 | Tambov | 156 | (26) |
| 2020 | → Aktobe (loan) | 10 | (3) |
| 2021 | Aktobe | 17 | (0) |
| 2022–2024 | Spartak Tambov | 61 | (3) |
- * Club domestic league appearances and goals

Oleg Vladimirovich Chernyshov (Russian: Олег Владимирович Чернышов; born 23 December 1986) is a Russian former professional football player.

== Club career ==
He made his Russian Premier League debut on 27 July 2019 for FC Tambov in a game against FC Spartak Moscow, as a 57th-minute substitute for Vladislav Kulik, at the age of 32.

On 21 February 2020, Chernyshov joined Aktobe on loan until the end of 2020.
