= Vyacheslav Bazylevych =

Ukrainian footballer

Personal information
- Full name: Vyacheslav Anatoliyovych Bazylevych
- Date of birth: 7 August 1990 (age 36)
- Place of birth: Simferopol, Ukrainian SSR, Soviet Union
- Height: 1.82 m (5 ft 11 1/2 in)
- Position: Goalkeeper

Youth career
- 2002: Tavriya Simferopol
- 2003–2007: Shakhtar Donetsk

Senior career*
Years	Team	Apps	(Gls)
2007–2011	Shakhtar Donetsk	0	(0)
2007–2008	→ Shakhtar-3 Donetsk	15	(0)
2012–2013	Krymteplytsia Molodizhne	28	(0)
2013–2014	Nyva Ternopil	5	(0)
2015–2017	TSK Simferopol	27	(0)
2018–2020	Krymteplytsia Molodizhne		

International career
2006	Ukraine U16	6	(0)
2005–2007	Ukraine U17	12	(0)
2008	Ukraine U18	8	(0)
2008–2009	Ukraine U19	7	(0)
Medal record
Men's football
Representing Ukraine
UEFA European Under-19 Championship
Winner	2009 Ukraine
- * Club domestic league appearances and goals

Vyacheslav Anatoliyovych Bazylevych (Ukrainian: В'ячеслав Анатолійович Базилевич), Vyacheslav Anatolevich Bazilevich (Russian: Вячеслав Анатольевич Базилевич; born 7 August 1990) is a Ukrainian-born Russian former football goalkeeper.

== Honours ==
Ukraine U19

- UEFA European Under-19 Football Championship: 2009
