= Dmytro Yeremenko =

Ukrainian footballer

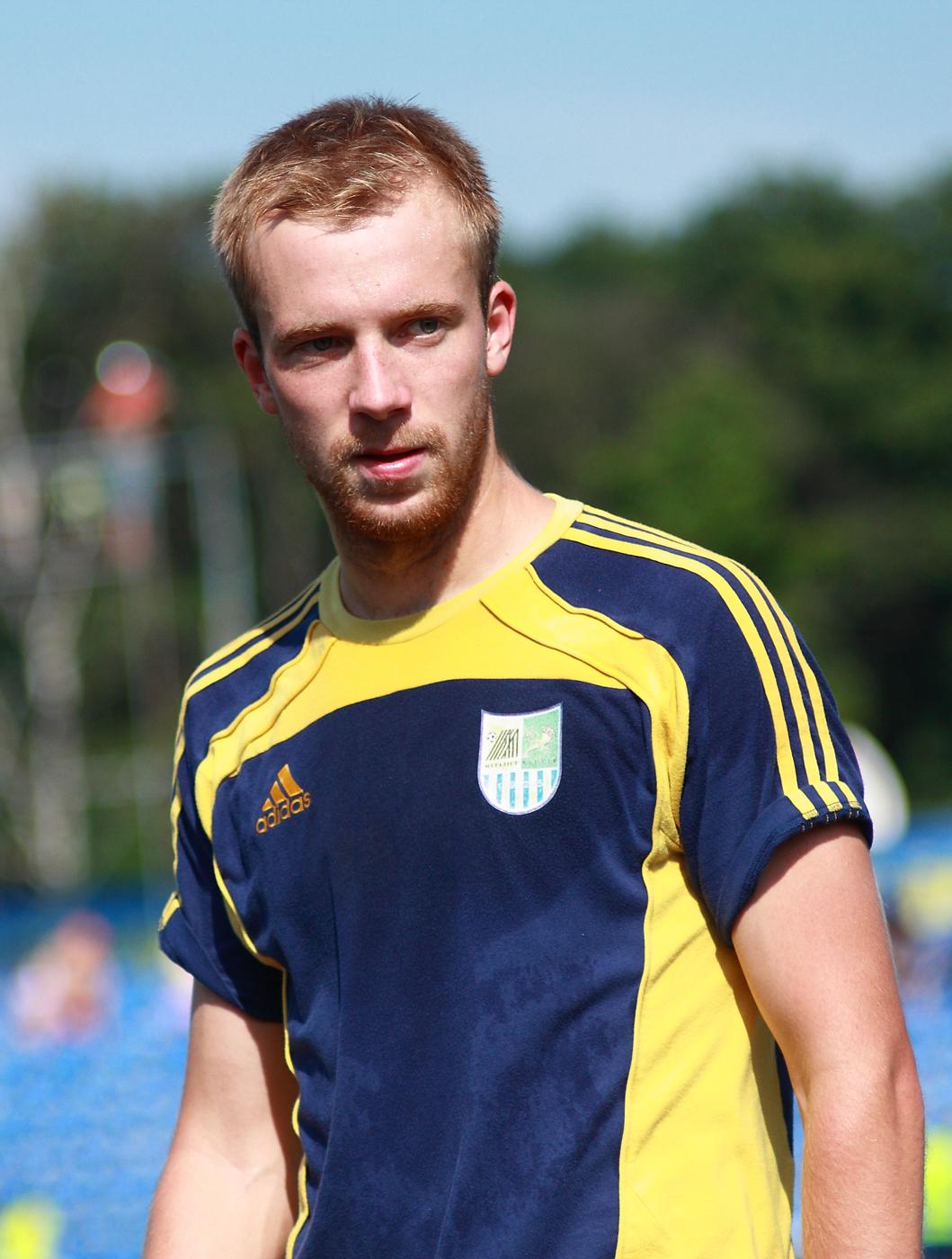

Personal information
- Full name: Dmytro Serhiyovych Yeremenko
- Date of birth: 20 June 1990 (age 36)
- Place of birth: Kharkiv, Ukrainian SSR
- Height: 1.84 m (6 ft 1/2 in)
- Position: Midfielder

Team information
- Current team: Dinaz Vyshhorod (youth coach)

Youth career
- 2002–2003: YS School #13 Kharkiv
- 2003–2006: UFK Kharkiv
- 2006–2007: Volyn Lutsk

Senior career*
| Years | Team | Apps | (Gls) |
| 2007 | Volyn Lutsk | 11 | (1) |
| 2007–2010 | Dynamo Kyiv | 0 | (0) |
| 2007–2009 | → Dynamo-2 Kyiv | 21 | (2) |
| 2009 | → Volyn Lutsk (loan) | 10 | (0) |
| 2010 | → Dynamo-2 Kyiv | 9 | (0) |
| 2010–2011 | Metalurh Zaporizhya | 19 | (0) |
| 2011–2014 | Metalist Kharkiv | 3 | (0) |
| 2012 | → Vorskla Poltava (loan) | 6 | (1) |
| 2013–2014 | → Bohemians 1905 (loan) | 11 | (0) |
| 2014 | Olimpik Donetsk | 7 | (0) |
| 2015 | Slutsk | 5 | (0) |
| 2015–2016 | Hoverla Uzhhorod | 9 | (0) |
| 2016–2018 | Obolon-Brovar Kyiv | 48 | (2) |
| 2018–2019 | Malynsk | 19 | (1) |
| 2019–2022 | Viktoriya Mykolaivka | 56 | (0) |
| 2022–2023 | Nyva Buzova | 3 | (0) |
| 2023 | Dinaz Vyshhorod | 12 | (0) |

International career^{‡}
| 2007 | Ukraine U17 | 4 | (0) |
| 2007–2009 | Ukraine U18 | 4 | (1) |
| 2008–2009 | Ukraine U19 | 11 | (0) |
| 2010 | Ukraine U20 | 1 | (0) |
| 2010–2011 | Ukraine U21 | 3 | (0) |
Medal record
Men's football
Representing Ukraine
UEFA European Under-19 Championship
| Winner | 2009 Ukraine |
- * Club domestic league appearances and goals as of 31 December 2023 ‡ National team caps and goals as of 10 January 2016

Dmytro Yeremenko (Ukrainian: Дмитро Сергійович Єременко, born 20 June 1990) is a Ukrainian former football midfielder.

== Honours ==
Viktoriya Mykolaivka

- Ukrainian Football Amateur League: 2019–20

Ukraine U19

- UEFA European Under-19 Championship: 2009
