= Dmytro Korkishko =

Ukrainian footballer (born 1990)

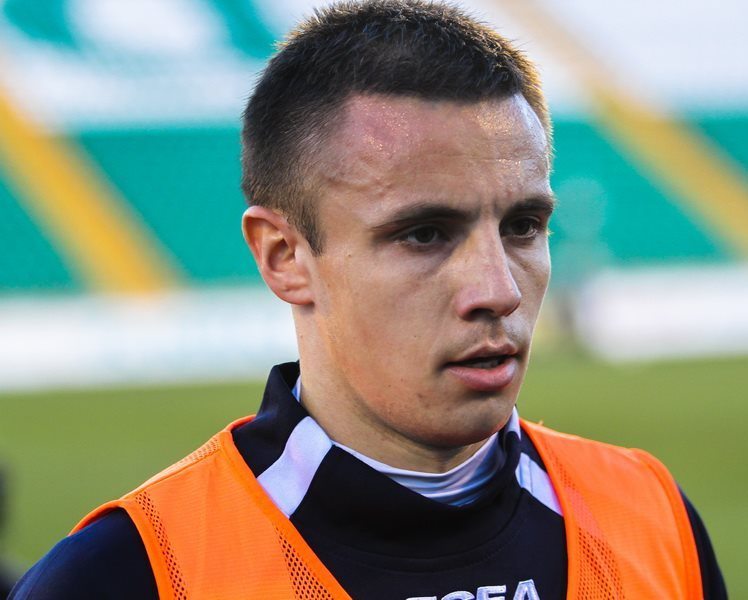

Personal information
- Full name: Dmytro Yuriyovych Korkishko
- Date of birth: 4 May 1990 (age 36)
- Place of birth: Cherkasy, Ukrainian SSR, Soviet Union
- Height: 1.75 m (5 ft 9 in)
- Position: Right winger

Team information
- Current team: Avanhard Lozova

Youth career
- 2003–2007: Dynamo Kyiv

Senior career*
Years	Team	Apps	(Gls)
2007–2014	Dynamo Kyiv	0	(0)
2007	→ Dynamo-3 Kyiv	3	(0)
2007–2009	→ Dynamo-2 Kyiv	51	(13)
2010	→ Arsenal Kyiv (loan)	3	(1)
2010–2013	→ Dynamo-2 Kyiv	40	(10)
2014	Minsk	7	(0)
2014–2015	Poltava	14	(0)
2015–2017	Chornomorets Odesa	43	(8)
2017–2018	Giresunspor	21	(6)
2018–2019	Hatayspor	25	(3)
2019–2020	Dnipro-1	30	(4)
2021	Chornomorets Odesa	10	(3)
2021–2022	Aktobe	6	(1)
2022–2023	Metalist Kharkiv	13	(1)
2024	Nyva Buzova	9	(2)
2024–2025	Kudrivka	20	(3)
2026–	Avanhard Lozova	0	(0)

International career^{‡}
2005–2006	Ukraine U16	12	(7)
2005–2007	Ukraine U17	23	(7)
2007–2008	Ukraine U18	15	(8)
2007–2009	Ukraine U19	18	(8)
2012	Ukraine U21	5	(2)

Managerial career
- 2026–: Kudrivka (Assistant coach)
Medal record
Men's football
Representing Ukraine
UEFA European Under-19 Championship
Winner	2009 Ukraine
- * Club domestic league appearances and goals as of 24 December 2025 ‡ National team caps and goals as of 18 January 2026

Dmytro Korkishko (Ukrainian: Дмитро Юрійович Коркішко, born 4 May 1990) is a Ukrainian professional footballer who plays as a right winger for Avanhard Lozova.

== Career ==
Korkishko began his playing career with FC Dynamo Kyiv's youth team. But than he not made his debut for main team. And went on loan in Arsenal Kyiv. Debut in Premier League's match against Karpaty Lviv on 13 March 2010. He played for different Ukrainian national youth teams.

In 2024 he signed for Kudrivka in Ukrainian First League. In January 2026 his contract was terminated by mutual agreement with the club.

In March 2026 he signed for Avanhard Lozova.

== Manager career ==
On 4 July 2026 he was appointed as Assistant coach of Kudrivka.

== International career ==
In 2009 he became champion in 2009 UEFA European Under-19 Football Championship.

== Honours ==
Ukraine U19

- UEFA European Under-19 Championship: 2009

Avanhard Lozova

- Ukrainian Amateur Cup: 2025–26
