= 2009 UEFA European Under-19 Championship =

Юнацький чемпіонат Європи з футболу (U-19) 2009
- 2009 UEFA Under-19 logo

Tournament details
- Host country: Ukraine
- Dates: 21 July – 2 August
- Teams: 8
- Venues: 4 (in Mariupol and Donetsk host cities)

Final positions
- Champions: Ukraine (1st title)
- Runners-up: England

Tournament statistics
- Matches played: 15
- Goals scored: 40 (2.67 per match)
- Attendance: 100,455 (6,697 per match)
- Top scorer: (England) Nathan Delfouneso (4)
- Best player: (Ukraine) Kyrylo Petrov

The UEFA European Under-19 Championship 2009 Final Tournament was held in Ukraine in the cities of Donetsk and Mariupol. Players born after 1 January 1990 were eligible to participate in this competition.

== Qualification ==
Qualification for the final tournament was played over two stages:

- 2009 UEFA European Under-19 Championship qualification – 2 October 2008 – 27 November 2008
- 2009 UEFA European Under-19 Championship elite qualification – 1 March 2009 – 31 May 2009

The following teams had qualified for the tournament:

- England
- France
- Serbia
- Slovenia
- Spain
- Switzerland
- Turkey
- Ukraine (host)

== Group A ==
Team	Pld	W	D	L	GF	GA	GD	Pts	Status
England	3	1	2	0	10	4	+6	5	Advanced to the semi-finals
Ukraine	3	1	2	0	3	2	+1	5	Advanced to the semi-finals
Switzerland	3	1	1	1	3	3	0	4	
Slovenia	3	0	1	2	2	9	−7	1	

21 July 2009
16:00 CET

England	1–1	Switzerland
Mattock 34'	Report	Wüthrich 90+2'

Metalurh Stadium, Donetsk
Attendance: 2,000
Referee: Manuel Gräfe (Germany)
21 July 2009
18:00 CET

Ukraine	0–0	Slovenia
	Report

RSC Olimpiyskiy, Donetsk
Attendance: 12,800
Referee: Jiří Jech (Czech Republic)

24 July 2009
16:00 CET

Slovenia	1–2	Switzerland
Fink 66'	Report	Pasche 79'; Mustafi 85'

Metalurh Stadium, Donetsk
Attendance: 1,100
Referee: Ovidiu Alin Hategan (Romania)
24 July 2009
18:00 CET

Ukraine	2–2	England
Petrov 2', 61'	Report	Lansbury 25' (pen.); Gosling 51'

RSC Olimpiyskiy, Donetsk
Attendance: 7,438
Referee: Bas Nijhuis (Netherlands)

27 July 2009
18:00 CET

Switzerland	0–1	Ukraine
	Report	Rybalka 85'

RSC Olimpiyskiy, Donetsk
Attendance: 4,300
Referee: István Vad (Hungary)
27 July 2009
18:00 CET

Slovenia	1–7	England
Dimitrov 50'	Report	Lansbury 10'; Briggs 19'; Welbeck 25', 32'; Delfouneso 38', 70'; Ranger 74'

Metalurh Stadium, Donetsk
Attendance: 300
Referee: Jérôme Efong Nzolo (Belgium)

== Group B ==
Team	Pld	W	D	L	GF	GA	GD	Pts	Status
Serbia	3	2	1	0	4	2	+2	7	Advanced to the semi-finals
France	3	1	2	0	3	2	+1	5	Advanced to the semi-finals
Spain	3	1	0	2	3	4	−1	3	
Turkey	3	0	1	2	2	4	−2	1	

21 July 2009
17:00 CET

France	1–1	Serbia
Brahimi 40'	Report	Aleksić 44'

Zakhidnyi Stadium, Mariupol
Attendance: 1,100
Referee: István Vad (Hungary)
21 July 2009
19:30 CET

Turkey	1–2	Spain
Albayrak 12'	Report	Falque 49' (pen.); Joselu 51'

Illichivets Stadium, Mariupol
Attendance: 9,200
Referee: Ovidiu Alin Hategan (Romania)

24 July 2009
15:30 CET

France	1–1	Turkey
N'Diaye 90'	Report	Yıldırım 64'

Zakhidnyi Stadium, Mariupol
Attendance: 1,000
Referee: Jérôme Efong Nzolo (Belgium)
24 July 2009
17:30 CET

Serbia	2–1	Spain
Milanović 36', 51'	Report	Joselu 6'

Illichivets Stadium, Mariupol
Attendance: 9,800
Referee: Jiří Jech (Czech Republic)

27 July 2009
16:00 CET

Spain	0–1	France
	Report	Brahimi 26'

Illichivets Stadium, Mariupol
Attendance: 8,500
Referee: Manuel Gräfe (Germany)
27 July 2009
16:00 CET

Serbia	1–0	Turkey
Aleksić 17'	Report

Zakhidnyi Stadium, Mariupol
Attendance: 1,017
Referee: Bas Nijhuis (Netherlands)

== Knock-out stage ==
=== Bracket ===
Semi-finals
30 July – Donetsk
England	3
France	1
30 July – Mariupol
Serbia	1
Ukraine	3

Final
2 August – Donetsk
England	0
Ukraine	2

=== Semi-finals ===
30 July 2009
16:30 CET

England	3–1 (a.e.t.)	France
Lansbury 37'; Delfouneso 92', 104'	Report	Gueye 8'

RSC Olimpiyskiy, Donetsk
Attendance: 4,200
Referee: Bas Nijhuis (Netherlands)

30 July 2009
19:00 CET

Serbia	1–3	Ukraine
Aleksić 22'	Report	Shakhov 1'; Harmash 39', 86'

Illichivets Stadium, Mariupol
Attendance: 12,600
Referee: Manuel Gräfe (Germany)

=== Final ===
2 August 2009
15:30 CET

England	0–2	Ukraine
	Report	Harmash 5'; Korkishko 50'

RSC Olimpiyskiy, Donetsk
Attendance: 25,100
Referee: Jiří Jech (Czech Republic)

England
GK	1	Jason Steele (c)
DF	2	Kieran Trippier
DF	3	Joe Mattock (yellow card) 45'
MF	4	Dan Gosling
DF	5	Kyle Walker
FW	7	Danny Welbeck (substituted off) 64'
MF	8	Danny Drinkwater (yellow card) 53' (substituted off) 55'
FW	10	Nathan Delfouneso
MF	11	Henri Lansbury
MF	16	Joe Bennett
DF	18	Matthew Briggs (substituted off) 56'
Substitutes
GK	13	Declan Rudd
DF	6	Gavin Hoyte (substituted on) 56'
FW	9	Nile Ranger (substituted on) 64'
FW	12	Rhys Murphy
MF	15	Andros Townsend
MF	17	Andrew Tutte (substituted on) 55'
Manager
(England) Brian Eastick

Ukraine
GK	1	Ihor Levchenko
DF	2	Dmytro Kushnirov
DF	3	Temur Partsvaniya
DF	4	Serhiy Kryvtsov
FW	7	Dmytro Korkishko 50'
MF	8	Kyrylo Petrov (c) (yellow card) 62' (substituted off) 90+6'
MF	9	Denys Harmash 5' (yellow card) 67'
MF	14	Yevhen Shakhov
MF	15	Serhiy Rybalka
FW	17	Valeriy Kaverin (substituted off) 80'
FW	19	Ihor Chaykovskyi
Substitutes
GK	12	Vyacheslav Bazylevych
DK	5	Maksym Bilyi
MF	10	Artur Karnoza
FW	11	Serhiy Shevchuk (substituted on) 80'
FW	18	Dmytro Yeremenko (substituted on) 90+6'
MF	20	Serhiy Lohinov
Manager
(Ukraine) Yuri Kalitvintsev

Assistant referees
(Sweden) Mathias Klasenius
(Lithuania) Saulius Dirda
Fourth official
(Hungary) Istvan Vad

2009 UEFA U-19 European champions

Ukraine
First title

== Goalscorers ==
4 goals

- (England) Nathan Delfouneso

3 goals

- (England) Henri Lansbury
- (Serbia) Danijel Aleksić
- (Ukraine) Denys Harmash

2 goals

- (England) Danny Welbeck
- (France) Yacine Brahimi
- (Serbia) Milan Milanović
- (Spain) Joselu
- (Ukraine) Kyrylo Petrov

1 goal

- (England) Matthew Briggs
- (England) Dan Gosling
- (England) Joseph Mattock
- (England) Nile Ranger
- (France) Magaye Gueye
- (France) Alfred N'Diaye
- (Slovenia) Dejan Dimitrov
- (Slovenia) Matic Fink
- (Spain) Iago Falque
- (Switzerland) Orhan Mustafi
- (Switzerland) Alexandre Pasche
- (Switzerland) Sébastien Wüthrich
- (Turkey) Eren Albayrak
- (Turkey) Sercan Yıldırım
- (Ukraine) Dmytro Korkishko
- (Ukraine) Serhiy Rybalka
- (Ukraine) Yevhen Shakhov
