= Dmytro Kushnirov =

Ukrainian footballer

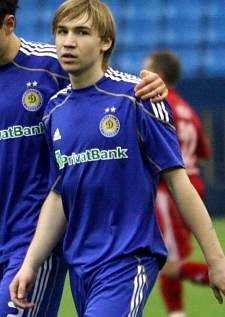
- Dmytro Kushnirov

Personal information
- Full name: Dmytro Oleksandrovych Kushnirov
- Date of birth: 1 April 1990 (age 36)
- Place of birth: Talne, Cherkasy Oblast, Ukrainian SSR
- Height: 1.79 m (5 ft 10 1/2 in)
- Position: Defender

Youth career
- 2003–2007: RVUFK Kyiv

Senior career*
Years	Team	Apps	(Gls)
2007–2008	Dynamo-3 Kyiv	5	(0)
2007–2013	Dynamo-2 Kyiv	142	(5)
2014	Daugava	1	(0)

International career^{‡}
2005–2006	Ukraine-16	5	(0)
2005–2007	Ukraine-17	21	(0)
2007–2008	Ukraine-18	16	(0)
2008–2009	Ukraine-19	10	(0)
2010–2012	Ukraine-21	15	(0)
Medal record
Men's football
Representing Ukraine
UEFA European Under-19 Championship
Winner	2009 Ukraine
- * Club domestic league appearances and goals as of 9 February 2016 ‡ National team caps and goals as of 9 February 2016

Dmytro Kushnirov (Ukrainian: Дмитро Олександрович Кушніров, born 1 April 1990) is a Ukrainian retired professional football defender who last played for Daugava Daugavpils in the Latvian Higher League and currently is retired from professional football career.

Kushnirov is product of RVUFK Kyiv sportive school.

He became the Champion of the European Under-19 Football Championship in 2009.

As for 2016 Kushnirov is working in the Ukrainian police and in February 2017 was promoted to the police rank of lieutenant.

== Honours ==
2009 UEFA European Under-19 Football Championship: Champion
