= 2021 Kazakhstan Premier League =

Kazakhstan Premier League
- Season: 2021
- Champions: Tobol
- Relegated: Kaisar; Zhetysu
- Champions League: Tobol
- Europa Conference League: Astana; Kairat; Kyzylzhar
- Matches: 182
- Goals: 448 (2.46 per match)
- Top goalscorer: Marin Tomasov (17 goals)
- Biggest home win: Tobol 5–0 Turan (23 April 2021); Kairat 5–0 Atyrau (2 July 2021)
- Biggest away win: Ordabasy 0–5 Kyzylzhar (26 August 2021)
- Highest scoring: Aktobe 4–4 Ordabasy (9 April 2021); Astana 6–2 Atyrau (10 April 2021)
- Longest winning run: 9 matches Astana
- Longest unbeaten run: 16 matches Astana
- Longest winless run: 11 matches Kaisar
- Longest losing run: 6 matches Zhetysu
- Highest attendance: 9,500- Kairat vs Aatana (24 October 2021)
- Lowest attendance: 0 - Many Matches COVID-19
- Total attendance: 232,645
- Average attendance: 1,939 (30 October 2021)
- All statistics correct as of 30 October 2021.

The 2021 Kazakhstan Premier League was the 30th season of the Kazakhstan Premier League, the highest football league competition in Kazakhstan. FC Kairat were the defending champions after winning their third title the previous season. FC Tobol won their second title.

== Teams ==
FC Okzhetpes (relegated after two years in the top flight) was relegated at the end of the 2020 season, whilst FC Irtysh Pavlodar withdrew from the league in May 2020, and as a result also dropped down into the Kazakhstan First Division. They were replaced by FC Aktobe and FC Atyrau after they had spent one season in the Kazakhstan First Division.

=== Team overview ===
Locations of teams in the 2021 Kazakhstan Premier League

Team	Location	Venue	Capacity
Aktobe	Aktobe	Central Stadium	13,200
Akzhayik	Oral	Petr Atoyan Stadium	8,320
Astana	Nur-Sultan	Astana Arena	30,000
Atyrau	Atyrau	Munaishy Stadium	8,690
Caspiy	Aktau	Zhastar Stadium	5,000
Kairat	Almaty	Central Stadium	25,057
Kaisar	Kyzylorda	Gani Muratbayev Stadium	7,500
Kyzylzhar	Petropavl	Karasai Stadium	11,000
Ordabasy	Shymkent	Kazhymukan Munaitpasov Stadium	20,000
Shakhter	Karaganda	Shakhter Stadium	20,000
Taraz	Taraz	Central Stadium	11,525
Tobol	Kostanay	Central Stadium	10,500
Turan	Turkistan	Turkistan Arena	7,000
Zhetysu	Taldykorgan	Samat Suyumbayev Stadium	4,000

=== Personnel and kits ===
Note: Flags indicate national team as has been defined under FIFA eligibility rules. Players and Managers may hold more than one non-FIFA nationality.

Team	Manager	Captain	Kit manufacturer	Shirt sponsor
Aktobe	(Russia) Vladimir Mukhanov	(Kazakhstan) Yury Logvinenko	Adidas	Parimatch
Akzhayik	(Ukraine) Volodymyr Mazyar		Adidas	
Astana	(Russia) Andrey Tikhonov	(Kazakhstan) Abzal Beisebekov	Adidas	Samruk-Kazyna
Atyrau	(Armenia) Aram Voskanyan		Adidas	GAZ Stroy Montazh KZ
Caspiy	(Serbia) Srdjan Blagojevic		Macron	XCOM (Back of shirt)
Kairat	(Turkmenistan) Kurban Berdyev	(Kazakhstan) Gafurzhan Suyumbayev	Nike	Halyk Bank
Kaisar	(Kazakhstan) Sultan Abildayev		Adidas	-
Kyzylzhar	(Kazakhstan) Andrei Karpovich		Nike	
Ordabasy	(Belarus) Aleksandr Sednyov	(Kazakhstan) Yerkebulan Tungyshbayev	Adidas	-
Shakhter	(Russia) Magomed Adiyev	(Russia) Arsen Khubulov	Adidas	Kazakhmys
Taraz	(Armenia) Vardan Minasyan		Puma	-
Tobol	(Kazakhstan) Alexander Moskalenko (Caretaker)	(Kazakhstan) Azat Nurgaliyev	Adidas	Polymetal
Turan	(Kazakhstan) Abdukhalik Buribayev		Adidas	-
Zhetysu	(Kazakhstan) Rinat Alyuetov		Adidas	

=== Foreign players ===
The number of foreign players is restricted to eight per KPL team. A team can use only five foreign players on the field in each game. For the 2020 season, the KFF announced that players from countries of the Eurasian Economic Union would not be counted towards a club's foreign player limit.

Club	Player 1	Player 2	Player 3	Player 4	Player 5	Player 6	Player 7	Player 8	Player 9
Aktobe	(Cameroon) Hervaine Moukam	(Czech Republic) Michal Jeřábek	(Lithuania) **Artūras Žulpa**	(Mali) **Tongo Doumbia**	(Ukraine) Dmytro Korkishko	(Ukraine) Vitaliy Balashov	(Georgia (country)) Zaza Tsitskishvili	(Ghana) Joachim Adukor	
Akzhayik	(Ukraine) Artem Baranovskyi	(Ukraine) Oleksiy Chychykov	(Ukraine) Mykola Kovtalyuk	(Ukraine) Serhiy Litovchenko	(Ukraine) Vitaliy Pryndeta	(Moldova) Ștefan Sicaci	(Mozambique) **Reginaldo**	(Georgia (country)) Luka Imnadze	
Astana	(Albania) Eneo Bitri	(Croatia) Luka Šimunović	(Croatia) **Marin Tomasov**	(Moldova) **Valeriu Ciupercă**	(Montenegro) **Žarko Tomašević**	(Serbia) **Antonio Rukavina**	(Spain) Cadete	(Portugal) Pedro Eugénio	(Montenegro) **Fatos Bećiraj**
Atyrau	(Serbia) Lazar Sajčić	(Brazil) Alex Bruno	(Brazil) Allef	(Brazil) Bryan	(Brazil) Gian	(Haiti) **Alex Junior Christian**	(Poland) Piotr Grzelczak	(Serbia) Danijel Stojković	
Caspiy	(France) Chafik Tigroudja	(Serbia) **Miloš Stanojević**	(Serbia) Nikola Cuckić	(Serbia) Marko Milošević	(Serbia) Nenad Gavrić	(Turkmenistan) **Ruslan Mingazow**	(Ukraine) Taras Bondarenko		
Kairat	(Brazil) **Vágner Love**	(Brazil) João Paulo	(Cameroon) **Macky Bagnack**	(Croatia) Dino Mikanović	(Guinea) **José Kanté**	(Montenegro) **Nebojša Kosović**	(Poland) **Jacek Góralski**	(Portugal) Ricardo Alves	(Serbia) Rade Dugalić
Kaisar	(Cameroon) **Clarence Bitang**	(Lithuania) **Karolis Laukžemis**	(Montenegro) Jovan Čađenović	(Montenegro) Stefan Denković	(Senegal) Ousmane N'Diaye	(Burundi) **Bonfils-Caleb Bimenyimana**			
Kyzylzhar	(Argentina) Pablo Podio	(Bosnia and Herzegovina) Semir Smajlagić	(Portugal) Carlos Fonseca	(Ivory Coast) **Moussa Koné**	(Montenegro) **Darko Zorić**	(Ukraine) Maksym Drachenko	(Ukraine) Yuriy Bushman		
Ordabasy	(Ukraine) Dmytro Khlyobas	(Nigeria) Chidi Osuchukwu	(Senegal) Abdoulaye Diakate	(Serbia) Aleksandar Simčević	(Tajikistan) **Muhammadjon Rakhimov**				
Shakhter	(Serbia) Stefan Bukorac	(Bosnia and Herzegovina) Edin Rustemović	(Bulgaria) Martin Toshev	(Croatia) Ivan Graf	(Ghana) David Mawutor	(North Macedonia) David Atanaskoski	(Serbia) Vuk Mitošević	(Cameroon) Abdel Lamanje	(Canada) Aramis Kouzine
Taraz	(Ivory Coast) Kódjo	(Nigeria) Faith Obilor	(Serbia) Nenad Adamović	(Serbia) Uroš Nenadović	(Portugal) Erivaldo	(Nigeria) Bruno Ibeh			
Tobol	(France) Jérémy Manzorro	(Georgia (country)) **Elguja Lobjanidze**	(Guinea-Bissau) **Toni Silva**	(North Macedonia) Aleksa Amanović	(Portugal) Rúben Brígido	(Serbia) Dušan Jovančić	(Serbia) **Zoran Tošić**	(Uzbekistan) **Igor Sergeev**	
Turan	(Montenegro) **Branislav Janković**	(Ukraine) Yevhen Chumak	(Serbia) Milan Stojanović	(Serbia) Stefan Živković	(Ukraine) Yevhen Smirnov	(North Macedonia) **Samir Fazli**	(Nigeria) Stanley		
Zhetysu	(Estonia) **Artjom Dmitrijev**	(Georgia (country)) Tengiz Tsikaridze	(Romania) **Gabriel Enache**	(Ukraine) Rizvan Ablitarov	(Ukraine) Temur Partsvania	(Ukraine) Vladyslav Okhronchuk	(Nigeria) Ugochukwu Oduenyi		

In bold: Players that have been capped for their national team.

=== Managerial changes ===
Team	Outgoing manager	Manner of departure	Date of vacancy	Position in table	Incoming manager	Date of appointment
Aktobe				Pre-Season	Alyaksey Baha	21 January 2021
Kyzylzhar	Veaceslav Rusnac			Pre-Season	Andrei Karpovich	8 January 2021
Ordabasy	Kakhaber Tskhadadze			Pre-Season	Aleksandr Sednyov	21 January 2021
Taraz	Vladimir Nikitenko			Pre-Season	Vardan Minasyan	3 February 2021
Shakhter Karagandy	Konstantin Gorovenka			Pre-Season	Ali Aliyev	20 January 2021
Zhetysu	Dmitry Ogai			Pre-Season	Rinat Alyuetov	15 January 2021
Shakhter Karagandy	Ali Aliyev	Resigned	10 April 2021	14th	Andrei Finonchenko (Caretaker)	10 April 2021
Shakhter Karagandy	Andrei Finonchenko (Caretaker)	End of role	16 April 2021	14th	Magomed Adiyev	16 April 2021
Aktobe	Alyaksey Baha	Resigned	5 May 2021	10th	Vladimir Zelenovskiy (Caretaker)	5 May 2021
Aktobe	Vladimir Zelenovskiy (Caretaker)	End of role	7 June 2021	10th	Vakhid Masudov	7 June 2021
Kairat	Aleksey Shpilevsky	Signed by Erzgebirge Aue	7 June 2021	3rd	Kirill Keker (Caretaker)	7 June 2021
Tobol	Grigori Babayan	Signed by CSKA Moscow	17 June 2021	2nd	Alexander Moskalenko (Caretaker)	18 June 2021
Aktobe	Vakhid Masudov	Resigned	26 July 2021	10th	Mukhtar Erimbetov (Caretaker)	26 July 2021
Aktobe	Mukhtar Erimbetov (Caretaker)	End of role	4 August 2021	10th	Vladimir Mukhanov	4 August 2021
Astana	Andrey Tikhonov	End of role	5 November 2021	End of season	Vladimir Yezhurov (Caretaker)	5 November 2021
Astana	Vladimir Yezhurov (Caretaker)	End of role	21 November 2021	End of season	Srdjan Blagojevic	21 November 2021
Caspiy	Srdjan Blagojevic	Signed by Astana	21 November 2021	End of season	Nikolay Kostov	31 December 2021

== Regular season ==
=== League table ===
Pos	Team	Pld	W	D	L	GF	GA	GD	Pts	Qualification or relegation
1	Tobol (C)	26	18	7	1	54	18	+36	61	Qualification for the Champions League first qualifying round
2	Astana	26	17	6	3	53	25	+28	57	Qualification for the Europa Conference League second qualifying round
3	Kairat	26	14	9	3	52	21	+31	51	Qualification for the Europa Conference League second qualifying round
4	Kyzylzhar	26	11	6	9	32	24	+8	39	Qualification for the Europa Conference League second qualifying round
5	Ordabasy	26	10	8	8	36	35	+1	38	
6	Shakhter Karagandy	26	9	6	11	25	34	−9	33	
7	Aktobe	26	9	6	11	35	40	−5	33	
8	Caspiy	26	8	8	10	35	35	0	32	
9	Akzhayik	26	9	5	12	25	31	−6	32	
10	Taraz	26	7	8	11	27	34	−7	29	
11	Atyrau	26	7	7	12	25	40	−15	28	
12	Turan	26	5	11	10	22	40	−18	26	
13	Kaisar (R)	26	4	7	15	24	44	−20	19	Relegation to the Kazakhstan First Division
14	Zhetysu (Note: Zhetysu had three points deducted on 10 March 2021 as a punishment for the unavailability of their nominated reserve stadium for their second match-day fixture.) (R)	26	5	4	17	23	47	−24	16	Relegation to the Kazakhstan First Division

Source: UEFA, Soccerway
Rules for classification: 1) Points; 2) Goal difference; 3) Matches won; 4) Goals scored; 5) Away goals scored; 6) Head-to-head points; 7) Head-to-head matches won; 8) Head-to-head goal difference; 9) Head-to-head goals scored; 10) Head-to-head away goals scored; 11) Draw.
(C) Champions; (R) Relegated

=== Results ===
==== Games 1–26 ====
Home \ Away	AKT	AKZ	AST	ATY	CAS	KRT	KSR	KYZ	ORD	SHA	TAR	TOB	TUR	ZHE
Aktobe		2–1	0–2	1–0	1–5	1–2	1–1	1–1	4–4	0–3	0–0	1–1	0–2	2–0
Akzhayik	1–0		0–1	1–0	0–3	1–0	1–1	0–1	0–1	1–1	3–0	0–2	1–1	3–2
Astana	2–1	1–0		6–2	2–0	1–1	2–0	3–1	0–2	4–3	3–0	1–1	1–1	1–0
Atyrau	1–3	2–0	0–2		2–1	1–0	1–1	0–0	0–0	0–1	1–0	0–1	2–2	2–2
Caspiy	1–1	2–2	2–2	2–1		1–1	2–4	1–2	0–0	3–0	1–0	2–1	0–0	2–0
Kairat	4–2	3–1	1–0	5–0	5–1		1–0	1–0	3–0	1–1	2–2	2–2	5–1	2–0
Kaisar	0–2	0–1	2–5	1–1	2–1	0–3		1–2	1–0	1–2	2–3	1–3	0–0	0–1
Kyzylzhar	1–2	0–1	3–2	0–1	2–0	1–1	2–0		3–2	2–0	2–2	0–2	0–1	3–0
Ordabasy	0–1	2–1	1–4	2–1	1–1	2–1	4–2	0–5		0–0	1–1	1–1	0–1	3–0
Shakhter Karagandy	1–0	1–2	0–1	3–1	1–0	1–1	1–1	0–1	0–2		1–0	0–3	0–1	3–1
Taraz	3–1	1–0	0–1	2–2	1–0	0–2	1–2	0–0	1–2	4–0		0–0	1–1	2–3
Tobol	2–1	2–0	1–1	2–0	2–1	2–2	1–0	2–0	3–1	4–1	3–0		5–0	2–1
Turan	1–2	0–2	2–2	1–2	2–2	0–3	1–1	1–0	1–1	0–0	0–1	2–4		0–2
Zhetysu	1–5	2–2	1–3	1–2	0–1	0–0	2–0	0–0	0–4	0–1	1–2	0–2	3–0	

Source: Soccerway
Legend: Blue = home team win; Yellow = draw; Red = away team win.

==== Results by match played ====
Team ╲ Round	1	2	3	4	5	6	7	8	9	10	11	12	13	14	15	16	17	18	19	20	21	22	23	24	25	26
Aktobe	D	D	W	D	W	L	L	L	L	W	D	L	L	L	W	W	D	L	W	D	L	W	W	L	W	L
Akzhayik	L	W	L	L	W	L	W	L	W	W	W	W	L	L	L	W	D	W	L	L	D	D	L	D	D	L
Astana	D	W	D	W	W	W	W	W	W	W	W	W	D	D	D	W	L	L	W	W	W	W	W	W	L	D
Atyrau	L	L	L	L	D	D	W	W	W	L	W	D	W	W	L	L	W	D	L	D	L	L	D	L	D	L
Caspiy	D	L	W	L	D	D	W	W	L	D	L	W	W	D	W	L	L	D	L	L	W	D	L	L	D	W
Kairat	W	W	D	W	D	D	L	W	D	D	L	W	D	W	W	W	W	D	W	L	W	D	W	W	W	D
Kaisar	L	L	D	W	L	D	L	L	D	L	D	L	L	L	D	W	L	D	W	L	L	D	L	L	L	W
Kyzylzhar	W	D	W	W	L	L	W	W	D	L	W	L	L	D	W	L	D	W	D	W	L	L	W	L	D	W
Ordabasy	L	W	W	D	L	W	W	L	L	D	D	D	D	D	W	L	W	W	L	W	D	D	L	W	W	L
Shakhter Karagandy	W	L	L	L	L	W	L	W	D	D	L	L	L	D	L	W	D	W	L	W	W	D	D	W	L	W
Taraz	W	D	D	W	W	W	L	W	L	L	L	L	D	D	L	L	D	L	W	D	D	L	D	W	L	L
Tobol	W	D	D	W	W	D	W	L	W	W	D	W	W	W	D	W	W	D	W	W	D	W	W	W	W	W
Turan	D	L	D	L	L	D	L	L	W	W	W	L	W	L	D	L	D	D	L	D	D	W	D	D	L	D
Zhetysu	L	W	L	L	D	L	L	L	L	L	L	W	W	W	L	L	L	L	D	L	D	L	L	L	W	D

W = Win; D = Draw; L = Loss; P = Postponed

=== Positions by round ===
Team ╲ Round	1	2	3	4	5	6	7	8	9	10	11	12	13	14	15	16	17	18	19	20	21	22	23	24	25	26
Tobol	2	3	5	4	4	4	2	4	2	2	2	2	2	2	2	2	1	1	1	1	2	2	2	2	1	1
Astana	5	2	4	2	1	1	1	1	1	1	1	1	1	1	1	1	2	2	2	2	1	1	1	1	2	2
Kairat	1	1	1	1	2	3	5	3	4	3	4	4	3	3	3	3	3	3	3	3	3	3	3	3	3	3
Kyzylzhar	9	10	7	6	6	7	6	5	5	6	5	5	9	9	6	7	8	6	4	4	4	4	4	4	5	4
Ordabasy	10	5	2	5	7	5	4	6	6	7	7	7	8	8	5	6	5	5	6	5	5	5	5	5	4	5
Akzhayik	13	7	10	11	8	9	9	9	8	5	3	3	4	5	8	4	4	4	5	6	6	6	7	6	7	9
Caspiy	8	11	8	8	9	8	7	7	7	8	10	8	5	6	4	5	7	8	8	8	7	7	8	10	9	8
Aktobe	7	9	3	7	5	6	8	8	11	9	9	10	11	11	10	10	10	10	10	10	11	8	6	7	6	7
Shakhter Karagandy	4	8	11	12	12	10	10	10	10	10	12	12	12	13	13	12	12	11	11	11	10	9	9	8	8	6
Atyrau	12	13	14	14	14	14	12	11	9	11	8	9	7	4	7	8	6	7	7	7	8	10	10	11	11	11
Taraz	3	4	6	3	3	2	3	2	3	4	6	6	6	7	9	9	9	9	9	9	9	11	11	9	10	10
Turan	6	12	12	13	13	13	14	14	13	12	11	11	10	10	11	11	11	12	12	12	12	12	12	12	12	12
Kaisar	11	14	13	9	11	11	11	12	12	13	13	13	14	14	14	14	14	14	13	13	13	13	13	13	13	13
Zhetysu	14	6	9	10	10	12	13	13	14	14	14	14	13	12	12	13	13	13	14	14	14	14	14	14	14	14

Leader
Europa Conference League second qualifying round
Relegation to 2022 Kazakhstan First Division

== Statistics ==
=== Scoring ===
- First goal of the season: Vitaliy Balashov for Shakhter Karagandy against Atyrau (13 March 2021)

=== Top scorers ===
As of matches played on 30 October 2021

Rank	Player	Club	Goals
1	(Croatia) Marin Tomasov	Astana	17
2	(Kazakhstan) Artur Shushenachev	Kairat	12
3	(Uzbekistan) Igor Sergeev	Aktobe/Tobol	11
4	(Guinea) José Kanté	Kairat	9
4	(Brazil) João Paulo	Ordabasy/Kairat	9
6	(Lithuania) Karolis Laukžemis	Kaisar	8
6	(Serbia) Nemanja Nikolić	Tobol	8
8	(Kazakhstan) Azat Nurgaliyev	Tobol	7
8	(Armenia) Tigran Barseghyan	Astana	7
8	(Portugal) Pedro Eugénio	Taraz/Astana	7
8	(Kazakhstan) Alibek Kasym	Kyzylzhar	7
8	(Brazil) Vágner Love	Kairat	7

== Attendance ==
Attendants who entered with free ticket are not counted.

Pos	Team	Total	High	Low	Average	Change
1	FC Aktobe	39,285	8,200	1,900	4,365	n/a
2	Taraz	30,500	3,500	1,000	2,346	n/a
3	Kairat	26,300	9,500	900	4,383	n/a
4	FC Astana	19,800	5,500	1,500	2,475	n/a
5	Kyzylzhar	19,300	2,000	700	1,608	n/a
6	FC Ordabasy	14,900	3,700	1,500	2,483	n/a
7	FC Shakhter Karagandy	14,200	4,000	1,000	2,366	n/a
8	FC Tobol	14,400	3,500	600	1,200	n/a
9	Turan	14,150	2,000	600	1,179	n/a
10	FC Akzhayik	9,560	2,000	560	1,365	n/a
11	FC Caspiy	8,850	1,300	700	885	n/a
12	Kaisar	8,650	1,500	950	1,235	n/a
13	Atyrau	6,400	1,500	700	1,066	n/a
14	Zhetysu	6,350	2,000	300	1,058	n/a
	League total	232,645	9,500	300	1,938	n/a

|u=30 October 2021|
