= 2019 FC Kairat season =

FC Kairat
2019 season
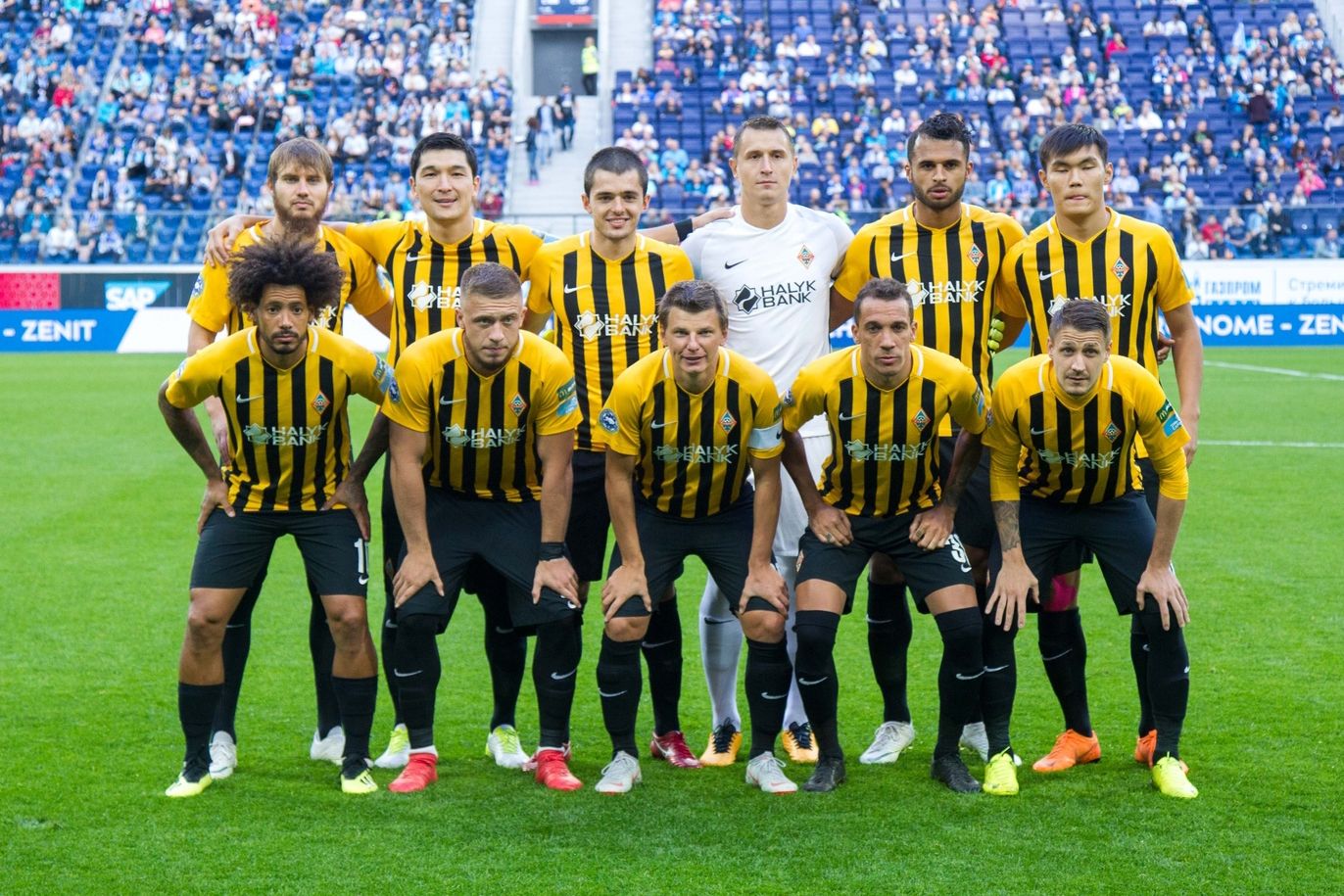
- Chairman: Kairat Boranbayev
- Manager: Aleksey Shpilevsky
- Stadium: Central Stadium
- Premier League: 2nd
- Kazakhstan Cup: Quarter-final
- Super Cup: Runners-up
- Europa League: Second qualifying round
- Top goalscorer: League: Aderinsola Eseola (19); All: Aderinsola Eseola (21)
Home colours	Away colours	Third colours

The 2019 FC Kairat season was the ninth successive season that the club playing in the Kazakhstan Premier League, the highest tier of association football in Kazakhstan, since their promotion back to the top flight in 2009. Kairat finished the season in 2nd place, 1 point behind champions Astana, reached the second qualifying round of the Europa League, where runners-up in the Kazakhstan Super Cup were knocked out of the Kazakhstan Cup at the quarter-final stage.

== Season events ==
On 25 November 2018, Kairat presented Aleksey Shpilevsky as their new manager.

Following the conclusion of the season, on 14 November, Aderinsola Eseola signed a new two-year contract with Kairat, whilst Sergey Keyler extended his contract for another two season with the option of an additional third season. On 25 November, Kairat announced that both Aybol Abiken and Stas Pokatilov had both signed new three-year contracts with the club.

== Squad ==
As of match played 10 November 2019

No.	Name	Nationality	Position	Date of birth (age)	Signed from	Signed in	Contract ends	Apps.	Goals
Goalkeepers
1	Vladimir Plotnikov	(Kazakhstan)	GK	26 May 1982 (aged 37)	Zhetysu	2015		113	0
27	Stas Pokatilov	(Kazakhstan)	GK	8 December 1992 (aged 26)	Rostov	2017	2022	97	0
30	Danil Ustimenko	(Kazakhstan)	GK	8 August 2000 (aged 19)	Youth Team	2019		0	0
Defenders
2	Yeldos Akhmetov	(Kazakhstan)	DF	1 June 1990 (aged 29)	Irtysh Pavlodar	2017		56	1
4	Nuraly Alip	(Kazakhstan)	DF	22 December 1999 (aged 19)	Academy	2018		42	0
5	Gafurzhan Suyumbayev	(Kazakhstan)	DF	19 August 1990 (aged 29)	Ordabasy	2016		124	8
6	Syarhey Palitsevich	(Belarus)	DF	9 April 1990 (aged 29)	Gençlerbirliği	2018		21	0
16	Sergey Keyler	(Kazakhstan)	DF	11 August 1994 (aged 25)	Okzhetpes	2018	2021	23	0
20	Rade Dugalić	(Serbia)	DF	5 November 1992 (aged 27)	Yenisey Krasnoyarsk	2019	2020	35	6
24	Dino Mikanović	(Croatia)	DF	7 May 1994 (aged 25)	AGF	2019	2020	36	1
37	Madi Aitore	(Kazakhstan)	DF	6 February 1998 (aged 21)	Academy	2019		2	0
Midfielders
7	Islambek Kuat	(Kazakhstan)	MF	12 January 1993 (aged 26)	Astana	2014		174	14
8	Georgy Zhukov	(Kazakhstan)	MF	19 November 1994 (aged 24)	Ural Yekaterinburg	2017		88	6
9	Bauyrzhan Islamkhan	(Kazakhstan)	MF	23 February 1993 (aged 26)	Kuban Krasnodar	2014		222	63
13	Han Jeong-uh	(South Korea)	MF	26 December 1998 (aged 20)	Sungsil University	2019	2020	6	0
14	Aybol Abiken	(Kazakhstan)	MF	1 June 1996 (aged 23)	Academy	2015	2022	56	5
17	Yerkebulan Tungyshbayev	(Kazakhstan)	MF	14 January 1995 (aged 24)	Ordabasy	2019	2021	16	0
18	Konrad Wrzesiński	(Poland)	MF	10 September 1993 (aged 26)	Zagłębie Sosnowiec	2019	2020	30	3
22	Nebojša Kosović	(Montenegro)	MF	24 February 1995 (aged 24)	Partizan	2019	2020	18	0
26	Ramazan Orazov	(Kazakhstan)	MF	30 January 1998 (aged 21)	Academy	2017		31	1
35	Aibarr Nurdaliyev	(Kazakhstan)	MF	12 August 1999 (aged 20)	Academy	2019		1	0
37	Adam Adakhadzhiev	(Kazakhstan)	MF	23 November 1998 (aged 20)	Academy	2019		3	0
Forwards
10	Yerkebulan Seydakhmet	(Kazakhstan)	FW	4 February 2000 (aged 19)	Ufa	2019	2022	15	1
11	Aderinsola Eseola	(Ukraine)	FW	28 June 1991 (aged 28)	Zirka Kropyvnytskyi	2018	2021	54	33
19	Márton Eppel	(Hungary)	FW	26 October 1991 (aged 28)	Budapest Honvéd	2018	2019	49	25
23	Vyacheslav Shvyrev	(Kazakhstan)	FW	7 January 2001 (aged 18)	Academy	2018		29	3
39	Sultanbek Astanov	(Kazakhstan)	FW	23 March 1999 (aged 20)	Academy	2019		12	2
47	Damir Bitussupov	(Kazakhstan)	FW	21 March 2000 (aged 19)	Academy	2019		1	0
54	Artur Shushenachev	(Kazakhstan)	FW	7 April 1998 (aged 21)	Academy	2017		8	1
Players away on loan
15	Aleksandr Sokolenko	(Kazakhstan)	DF	23 November 1996 (aged 22)	Kyzylzhar	2017		31	2
25	Samat Sarsenov	(Kazakhstan)	FW	19 August 1996 (aged 23)	Orenburg	2017		15	1
28	Rifat Nurmugamet	(Kazakhstan)	FW	22 May 1996 (aged 23)	Academy	2013		6	1
	Nurlan Dairov	(Kazakhstan)	MF	26 June 1995 (aged 24)	Academy	2012		3	0
	Magomed Paragulgov	(Kazakhstan)	FW	26 March 1994 (aged 25)	Academy	2012		33	5
Players that left during the season
3	Yan Vorogovskiy	(Kazakhstan)	DF	7 August 1996 (aged 23)	Kaisar	2016		70	3

=== Out on loan ===
Note: Flags indicate national team as defined under FIFA eligibility rules; some limited exceptions apply. Players may hold more than one non-FIFA nationality.

No.	Pos.	Nation	Player
15	DF	KAZ	Aleksandr Sokolenko (at Irtysh Pavlodar)
25	FW	KAZ	Samat Sarsenov (at Taraz)
28	FW	KAZ	Rifat Nurmugamet (at Zhetysu)

No.	Pos.	Nation	Player
—	MF	KAZ	Nurlan Dairov (at Okzhetpes)
—	FW	KAZ	Magomed Paragulgov (at Irtysh Pavlodar)

== Transfers ==
=== In ===
Date	Position	Nationality	Name	From	Fee	Ref.
7 January 2019	MF	(Kazakhstan)	Yerkebulan Tungyshbayev	Ordabasy	Undisclosed	
19 January 2019	DF	(Serbia)	Rade Dugalić	Yenisey Krasnoyarsk	Free	
22 January 2019	MF	(Poland)	Konrad Wrzesiński	Zagłębie Sosnowiec	Undisclosed	
26 January 2019	MF	(South Korea)	Han Jeong-uh	Gyeongnam	Undisclosed	
19 February 2019	DF	(Croatia)	Dino Mikanović	AGF	Undisclosed	
2 April 2019	MF	(Montenegro)	Nebojša Kosović	Partizan	Undisclosed	
25 June 2019	FW	(Kazakhstan)	Yerkebulan Seydakhmet	Ufa	Undisclosed	

=== Out ===
Date	Position	Nationality	Name	To	Fee	Ref.
29 June 2019	DF	(Kazakhstan)	Yan Vorogovskiy	K Beerschot VA	Undisclosed	

=== Loans out ===
Date from	Position	Nationality	Name	To	Date to	Ref.
24 January 2019	MF	(Kazakhstan)	Nurlan Dairov	Okzhetpes	End of season	
27 February 2019	FW	(Kazakhstan)	Magomed Paragulgov	Irtysh Pavlodar	End of season	
6 July 2019	DF	(Kazakhstan)	Aleksandr Sokolenko	Irtysh Pavlodar	End of season	
12 July 2019	FW	(Kazakhstan)	Rifat Nurmugamet	Zhetysu	End of season	
24 July 2019	FW	(Kazakhstan)	Samat Sarsenov	Taraz	End of season	

=== Released ===
Date	Position	Nationality	Name	Joined	Date	Ref.
30 December 2019	MF	(Kazakhstan)	Islambek Kuat	Orenburg	1 January 2020	
31 December 2019	DF	(Belarus)	Syarhey Palitsevich	Shakhtyor Soligorsk	16 January 2020	
31 December 2019	DF	(Kazakhstan)	Yeldos Akhmetov	Kaisar	11 January 2020	
31 December 2019	MF	(Kazakhstan)	Bauyrzhan Islamkhan	Al Ain	31 January 2020	
31 December 2019	MF	(Kazakhstan)	Georgy Zhukov	Wisła Kraków	1 January 2020	
31 December 2019	FW	(Hungary)	Márton Eppel	Cercle Brugge	14 January 2020	
31 December 2019	FW	(Kazakhstan)	Magomed Paragulgov			

=== Trial ===
Date From	Date To	Position	Nationality	Name	Last club	Ref.
January 2019		DF	(Greece)	Giannis Kargas	Dynamo Brest	

== Friendlies ==
17 January 2019	Kairat	4 – 0	Zhetysu-B	Almaty
(UTC+6)	Kuantayev; Islamkhan; Sarsenov; A.Sokolenko	Report		Stadium: Kariat Training Ground

30 January 2019	Kairat (Kazakhstan)	v	(Russia) Chayka Peschanokopskoye	Antalya, Turkey
(UTC+6)		Report

31 January 2019	Kairat (Kazakhstan)	1 – 0	(Russia) Chayka Peschanokopskoye	Antalya, Turkey
(UTC+6)	Dugalić; Eseola	Report	Podbeltsev 30'

1 February 2019	Kairat (Kazakhstan)	3 – 3	(Bosnia and Herzegovina) Velež Mostar	Antalya, Turkey
(UTC+6)	Islamkhan; Vorogovskiy; Eseola	Report	Dugalić (o.g.); Fajić; Brandão de Sousa	Referee: Krzysztof Jakubik

== Competitions ==
=== Super Cup ===
3 March 2019	Astana	2 – 0	Kairat	Almaty
15:00 (UTC+6)	Kabananga 7', 65'; Beisebekov (yellow card) 45'; Postnikov (yellow card) 56'	Report	Mikanović (yellow card) 57'; Kuat (yellow card) 61'; Eseola (red card) 84'	Stadium: Central Stadium; Attendance: 16,000; Referee: Igor Chesnokov

=== Premier League ===
==== Results summary ====
Overall								Home						Away					
Pld	W	D	L	GF	GA	GD	Pts	W	D	L	GF	GA	GD	W	D	L	GF	GA	GD
33	22	2	9	65	32	+33	68	12	1	4	38	11	+27	10	1	5	27	21	+6

Last updated: 10 November 2019.
Source: See Results

==== Results by round ====
Round	1	2	3	4	5	6	7	8	9	10	11	12	13	14	15	16	17	18	19	20	21	22	23	24	25	26	27	28	29	30	31	32	33
Ground	H	H	A	H	A	H	H	A	A	H	A	H	A	H	A	H	A	H	H	A	A	A	A	H	A	H	A	H	H	A	H	A	H
Result	W	W	W	W	L	L	W	D	L	L	L	W	W	W	W	D	W	L	W	W	W	W	W	L	W	W	W	W	W	L	W	L	W
Position	5	5	3	1	3	3	3	3	5	6	5	5	5	3	4	3	4	3	3	3	3	3	3	2	2	2	1	1	1	1	2	2	2

Source: See Results
A = Away; H = Home; W = Win; D = Draw; L = Loss

==== Results ====
10 March 2019 1	Kairat	2 – 0	Taraz	Almaty
15:00 (UTC+6)	R.Nurmugamet 26' (yellow card) 51'; Eppel (yellow card) 27'; Abiken 67'	Report	Gian (yellow card) 42'; Elivelto (yellow card) 50'; M.Amirkhanov (yellow card) 54'; R.Rozybakiev (yellow card) 83'	Stadium: Central Stadium; Attendance: 5,500; Referee: Anatolyi Vishnichenko

15 March 2019 2	Kairat	2 – 1	Shakhter Karagandy	Almaty
18:45 (UTC+6)	Eppel 28' (pen.); Kuat (yellow card) 45'; Shvyrev 76'; Abiken (yellow card) 80'; R.Orazov (yellow card) 88'	Report	Chichulin (yellow card) 24'; Zenjov 81'; Shakhmetov (yellow card) 89'	Stadium: Central Stadium; Attendance: 4,200; Referee: Bakhyt Kyzylbaev

31 March 2019 3	Aktobe	1 – 3	Kairat	Kostanay
14:00 (UTC+6)	A.Tanzharikov (yellow card) 43'; A.Shurigin 72'	Report	Wrzesiński 12' (yellow card) 31'; Mikanović 35'; Eseola 45+3'; S.Keyler (yellow card) 55'; Dugalić (yellow card) 82'; R.Orazov (yellow card) 85'; Sarsenov (yellow card) 89'	Stadium: Central Stadium; Attendance: 1,000; Referee: Zhandos Abzhan

6 April 2019 4	Kairat	4 – 1	Okzhetpes	Almaty
17:00 (UTC+6)	Vorogovskiy (yellow card) 2'; Eseola 11', 27'; Palitsevich (yellow card) 39'; Dugalić 44', 81'; S.Astanov (yellow card) 67'	Report	S.Zhumakhanov 2' (yellow card) 75'; Miller (yellow card) 30'	Stadium: Central Stadium; Attendance: 2,800; Referee: Bagdat Abdullaev

14 April 2019 5	Zhetysu	3 – 0	Kairat	Taldıqorğan
16:00 (UTC+6)	E.Altynbekov (yellow card) 15'; Naumov 25' (yellow card) 90+5'; Hromțov 88'; Hovhannisyan 90+5'	Report	Eseola (yellow card) 2'; Palitsevich (yellow card) 50'; S.Keyler (yellow card) 56'; Pokatilov (yellow card) 85'; Dugalić (yellow card) 89'; Abiken (yellow card) 90+2'	Stadium: Zhetysu Stadium; Attendance: 2,000; Referee: Artyom Kuchin

20 April 2019 6	Kairat	0 – 1	Astana	Almaty
17:00 (UTC+6)	Suyumbayev (yellow card) 61'; Kosović (yellow card) 87'	Report	Rotariu 21' (yellow card) 41'; Beisebekov (yellow card) 60'	Stadium: Central Stadium; Attendance: 10,500; Referee: Anatolyi Vishnichenko

24 April 2019 20	Kairat	2 – 0	Atyrau	Almaty
19:00 (UTC+6)	Eppel 17', 90'; Han (yellow card) 45+1'; Suyumbayev (yellow card) 63'; Dugalić (yellow card) 90+4'	Report	Filipović (yellow card) 39'; A.Nurybekov (yellow card) 45+1' (yellow-red card) 77'; Ablitarov (yellow card) 47'; D.Mazhitov (yellow card) 52'	Stadium: Central Stadium; Attendance: 2,500; Referee: Arman Ismuratov

27 April 2019 7	Ordabasy	0 – 0	Kairat	Shymkent
17:00 (UTC+6)	Diakate (yellow card) 49'; Malyi (yellow card) 62'	Report	Vorogovskiy (yellow card) 20' (yellow-red card) 85'; Pokatilov (yellow card) 36'; R.Orazov (yellow card) 46'; Suyumbayev (yellow card) 48'; Kuat (yellow card) 62'	Stadium: Kazhymukan Munaitpasov Stadium; Attendance: 5,000; Referee: Bulat Saryev

1 May 2019 8	Kaisar	2 – 1	Kairat	Kyzylorda
17:30 (UTC+6)	Tagybergen (yellow card) 45+1' (goal) 64'; Marochkin 52'; Gorman (yellow card) 81'	Report	Eppel 20'; Kuat (yellow card) 58'; Abiken (yellow card) 62'	Stadium: Gani Muratbayev Stadium; Attendance: 2,600; Referee: Denis Izmailov

5 May 2019 9	Kairat	0 – 1	Tobol	Almaty
18:00 (UTC+6)	Kuat (yellow card) 65'; Shvyrev (yellow card) 90+1'	Report	Bocharov (yellow card) 49'; Fedin (yellow card) 64'; Žulpa (yellow card) 69'; Turysbek 87'	Stadium: Central Stadium; Attendance: 5,000; Referee: Grigory Moskovchenko

12 May 2019 10	Atyrau	2 – 1	Kairat	Nur-Sultan
19:00 (UTC+6)	Žunić 35' (pen.); Ablitarov 69'; Loginovsky (yellow card) 90+2'	Report	Dugalić (yellow card) 34'; Eseola 36'; Abiken (yellow card) 65'	Stadium: Astana Arena; Attendance: 500; Referee: Saken Bayimbet

19 May 2019 11	Kairat	2 – 1	Irtysh Pavlodar	Almaty
19:00 (UTC+6)	Eseola 6', 41' (yellow card) 34'; Alip (yellow card) 62'; Sarsenov (yellow card) 87'	Report	D.Shmidt (yellow card) 30'; Cañas 34'	Stadium: Central Stadium; Attendance: 2,500; Referee: Furkat Atajanov

26 May 2019 12	Shakhter Karagandy	1 – 2	Kairat	Nur-Sultan
18:00 (UTC+6)	B.Shaikhov (yellow card) 26'; Shkodra 29'; Nurgaliyev (yellow card) 56'; Chichulin (yellow card) 90+4'	Report	Zhukov (yellow card) 32'; Eseola 74', 79'; Kuat (yellow card) 75'; Eppel (yellow card) 90+2'; Abiken (yellow card) 90+3'	Stadium: Astana Arena; Attendance: 1,000; Referee: Bolat Saryev

31 May 2019 13	Kairat	3 – 0	Aktobe	Almaty
(UTC+6)	Eseola (yellow card) 52' (goal) 60', 73'; Kuat (yellow card) 55'; Eppel 89'	Report		Stadium: Central Stadium; Attendance: 7,800; Referee: Georgiy Chekhovskiy

16 June 2019 14	Okzhetpes	1 – 2	Kairat	Kokshetau
17:00 (UTC+6)	Alves (yellow card) 46'; S.Zhumakhanov 90'; Dmitrijev (yellow card) 90+1'	Report	Islamkhan 9' (yellow card) 90+1'; Kuat (yellow card) 32'; Eseola (yellow card) 48' (goal) 75'	Stadium: Okzhetpes Stadium; Attendance: 3,000; Referee: Grigory Moskovchenko

23 June 2019 15	Kairat	0 – 0	Zhetysu	Almaty
19:00 (UTC+6)	Akhmetov (yellow card) 31'; Abiken (yellow card) 64'	Report		Stadium: Central Stadium; Attendance: 7,500; Referee: Aleksandr Gauzer

30 June 2019 16	Astana	0 – 2	Kairat	Pavlodar
20:00 (UTC+6)	Mayewski (yellow card) 50'	Report	Akhmetov (yellow card) 32'; Dugalić 68'; Abiken 70'; Kuat (yellow card) 90+2'	Stadium: Central Stadium; Attendance: 3,800; Referee: Igor Chesnokov
Note: Match was played at the Central Stadium in Pavlodar instead of Astana's normal home ground of the Astana Arena in Nur-Sultan.

5 July 2019 17	Kairat	0 – 1	Ordabasy	Almaty
19:00 (UTC+6)	Abiken (yellow card) 37'; R.Orazov (yellow card) 45+1'; Akhmetov (yellow card) 90+4'; Suyumbayev (yellow card) 90+4'; Kosović (yellow card) 90+4'	Report	Badibanga 90' (yellow card) 90'; Zhangylyshbay (yellow card) 90+4'	Stadium: Central Stadium; Attendance: 7,000; Referee: Denis Tevyashov

14 July 2019 18	Kairat	5 – 1	Kaisar	Almaty
20:00 (UTC+6)	Eppel 16', 59', 73' (yellow card) 38'; Palitsevich (yellow card) 27'; Alip (yellow card) 48'; Abiken (yellow card) 55' (goal) 62'; Islamkhan 80' (pen.)	Report	Marochkin (yellow card) 36'; Narzildaev (yellow card) 36'; Baizhanov (yellow card) 38'; Barseghyan 89'	Stadium: Central Stadium; Attendance: 6,500; Referee: Bolat Karlibayev

21 July 2019 19	Tobol	3 – 5	Kairat	Kostanay
18:00 (UTC+6)	Žulpa 14'; Kvekveskiri (yellow card) 24'; Fedin 31'; Kankava (yellow card) 40'; Valiullin (yellow card) 69'; Sebai 83'; Andriuškevičius (red card) 85'	Report	R.Orazov (yellow card) 30'; Seydakhmet 45+1'; Eppel 73', 79'; Eseola 82'; Islamkhan 87' (pen.)	Stadium: Central Stadium; Attendance: 4,000; Referee: Artyom Kuchin

4 August 2019 21	Irtysh Pavlodar	0 – 2	Kairat	Pavlodar
19:00 (UTC+6)	Fonseca (yellow card) 65'	Report	Kosović (yellow card) 11' (yellow-red card) 25'; S.Astanov 20'; Abiken 68'	Stadium: Central Stadium; Attendance: 3,600; Referee: Georgiy Chekhovskiy

11 August 2019 22	Taraz	0 – 1	Kairat	Taraz
19:30 (UTC+6)	Subotić (yellow card) 48'; R.Rozybakiev (yellow card) 59'; M.Amirkhanov (yellow card) 75'; M.Nuraly (yellow card) 79'	Report	Palitsevich (yellow card) 25'; Eppel (yellow card) 59'; Eseola (yellow card) 60'; Kuat (yellow card) 69'; Islamkhan 84' (pen.)	Stadium: Central Stadium; Attendance: 6,500; Referee: Bolat Saryev

17 August 2019 23	Taraz	0 – 2	Kairat	Taraz
19:00 (UTC+6)	Simčević (yellow card) 35'	Report	Dugalić (yellow card) 14'; Mikanović (yellow card) 40'; Eseola (yellow card) 55' (goal) 59'; Islamkhan 71'	Stadium: Central Stadium; Attendance: 3,800; Referee: Denis Izmailov

25 August 2019 24	Kairat	0 – 1	Okzhetpes	Almaty
20:00 (UTC+6)	Suyumbayev (yellow card) 45+2'; Kuat (yellow card) 53'; Eseola (yellow card) 54'	Report	Zorić 6'; Moldakaraev (yellow card) 54'; A.Saparov (yellow card) 76'; Y.Baginsky (yellow card) 90+3'	Stadium: Central Stadium; Attendance: 7,000; Referee: Daniyar Sakhi

31 August 2019 25	Shakhter Karagandy	0 – 4	Kairat	Karaganda
17:00 (UTC+6)	Nurgaliyev (yellow card) 12'; Kizito (yellow card) 67'	Report	Eppel 2' (yellow card) 88'; Islamkhan 52'; Eseola 69'; Wrzesiński 78'	Stadium: Shakhter Stadium; Attendance: 5,000; Referee: Askhat Abdanbayev

15 September 2019 26	Kairat	4 – 1	Zhetysu	Almaty
19:00 (UTC+6)	Eseola 13', 80'; Suyumbayev 19'; Abiken (yellow card) 24'; Eppel 31' (yellow card) 57'; Zhukov (yellow card) 34'	Report	Zhaksylykov 59'; Stepanyuk (yellow card) 64'; Kuantayev (yellow card) 70'	Stadium: Central Stadium; Attendance: 4,000; Referee: Igor Chesnokov

21 September 2019 27	Kaisar	0 – 1	Kairat	Kyzylorda
18:00 (UTC+6)	Lamanje (yellow card) 59'	Report	Kuat (yellow card) 25'; Dugalić 56'; Alip (yellow card) 57'; Suyumbayev (yellow card) 74'	Stadium: Gani Muratbayev Stadium; Attendance: 3,500; Referee: Aleksandr Gauzer

29 September 2019 28	Kairat	4 – 1	Ordabasy	Almaty
19:00 (UTC+6)	Eseola 41'; Eppel 45+2', 69'; Kuat (yellow card) 68'; Dugalić (yellow card) 71'; Shvyrev 90+1'	Report	Dosmagambetov 84'	Stadium: Central Stadium; Attendance: 10,000; Referee: Bakhyt Kyzylbaev

5 October 2019 29	Kairat	6 – 0	Aktobe	Almaty
17:00 (UTC+6)	Wrzesiński 4'; Eppel 6', 69' (yellow card) 86'; Zhukov (yellow card) 29'; Suyumbayev 54'; Eseola 58'; Islamkhan 60'	Report	A.Tanzharikov (yellow card) 15'; A.Azhimov (yellow card) 38'	Stadium: Central Stadium; Attendance: 7,500; Referee: Askhat Abdanbayev

20 October 2019 30	Astana	3 – 1	Kairat	Nur-Sultan
20:00 (UTC+6)	Tomasov 9'; Erić (yellow card) 55'; Rotariu (yellow card) 55'; Khizhnichenko 61'; Janga 90+5' (yellow card) 90+5'	Report	Eseola (yellow card) 39'; Islamkhan (yellow card) 55'; Plotnikov (yellow card) 55'; Dugalić 68'	Stadium: Astana Arena; Attendance: 16,200; Referee: Artyom Kuchin

26 October 2019 31	Kairat	2 – 0	Tobol	Almaty
17:00 (UTC+6)	Seydakhmet (yellow card) 43'; Zhukov 73'; Alip (yellow card) 79'; Abiken (yellow card) 89'; Shushenachev 90+3'	Report	Sebai (yellow card) 63'	Stadium: Central Stadium; Attendance: 12,000; Referee: Denis Izmailov

3 November 2019 32	Irtysh Pavlodar	5 – 0	Kairat	Pavlodar
15:00 (UTC+6)	Vitas (yellow card) 12'; S.Sagnayev 38'; Georgijević (yellow card) 64'; Manzorro 65' (yellow card) 68'; A.Kenesov (yellow card) 71' (goal) 86'; Stamenković 80'; Fonseca 90+2'	Report	Abiken (yellow card) 64'; Suyumbayev (yellow card) 71'; Mikanović (yellow card) 88'; Kuat (yellow card) 90+1'	Stadium: Central Stadium; Attendance: 1,500; Referee: Igor Chesnokov

10 November 2019 33	Kairat	2 – 1	Atyrau	Almaty
15:00 (UTC+6)	Zhukov 18'; Eseola 70'; Mikanović (yellow card) 80'; R.Orazov (yellow card) 85'	Report	E.Abdrakhmanov (yellow card) 31'; Grzelczak (yellow card) 33'; Dugalić 76' (o.g.)	Stadium: Central Stadium; Attendance: 2,500; Referee: Denis Tevyashov

==== League table ====
Pos	Team	Pld	W	D	L	GF	GA	GD	Pts	Qualification or relegation
1	Astana (C)	33	22	3	8	67	28	+39	69	Qualification for the Champions League first qualifying round
2	Kairat	33	22	2	9	65	32	+33	68	Qualification for the Europa League first qualifying round
3	Ordabasy	33	19	8	6	52	24	+28	65	Qualification for the Europa League first qualifying round
4	Tobol	33	19	6	8	45	27	+18	63	
5	Zhetysu	33	16	8	9	45	25	+20	56	

Source: UEFA, Soccerway
Rules for classification: 1) Points; 2) Goal difference; 3) Matches won; 4) Goals scored; 5) Away goals scored; 6) Head-to-head points; 7) Head-to-head matches won; 8) Head-to-head goal difference; 9) Head-to-head goals scored; 10) Head-to-head away goals scored; 11) Draw.
(C) Champions

=== Kazakhstan Cup ===
10 April 2019 Last 16	Caspiy	1 – 1 (a.e.t.) (5 – 6 p)	Kairat	Aktau
16:00 (UTC+6)	T.Kusyapov (yellow card) 19'; Vorotnikov (yellow card) 33'; R.Zhanysbaev (yellow card) 51'; R.Khayrullin 58'	Report	Alip (red card) 12'; S.Astanov 18'; Akhmetov (red card) 28'; Abiken (yellow card) 55'	Stadium: Zhastar Stadium; Attendance: 4,000; Referee: Denis Tevyashov
	Penalties
	K.Begalin (penalty missed); Čubrilo (penalty scored); R.Khayrullin (penalty scored); B.Kabylan (penalty scored); T.Kusyapov (penalty scored); K.Shestak (penalty scored); M.Gabyshev (penalty missed); O.Mukhanov (penalty missed)		(penalty scored) Abiken; (penalty scored) A.Adahajiev; (penalty scored) A.Sokolenko; (penalty missed) A.Sushenachev; (penalty scored) Suyumbayev; (penalty scored) M.Aytore; (penalty scored) Shvyrev; (penalty scored) A.Nurbaliev

8 May 2019 Quarterfinal	Kairat	1 – 5	Tobol	Almaty
19:00 (UTC+6)	Shvyrev (yellow card) 32'; Suyumbayev (yellow card) 45+5'; Sarsenov (yellow card) 64' (goal) 90+1'	Report	Turysbek 13'; Fedin 25'; Dmitrenko (yellow card) 36'; Gordeichuk 44'; Kuat 59' (o.g.); Nurgaliev 86'	Stadium: Central Stadium; Attendance: 2,000; Referee: Artem Kuchin

=== UEFA Europa League ===
==== Qualifying rounds ====
12 July 2019 First qualifying round 1st leg	Široki Brijeg (Bosnia and Herzegovina)	1 – 2	(Kazakhstan) Kairat	Široki Brijeg, Bosnia and Herzegovina
01:00 (UTC+6)	Yenin 34'; Bagarić (yellow card) 57'; D.Kovačić (yellow card) 59'; Marić (yellow card) 70'	Report	Akhmetov (yellow card) 6'; Abiken (yellow card) 26'; Eseola 29', 58'; R.Orazov (yellow card) 49'; Zhukov (yellow card) 54'; Kosović (yellow card) 71'	Stadium: Stadion Pecara; Attendance: 2,436; Referee: Sebastian Colțescu (Romania)

18 July 2019 First qualifying round 2nd leg	Kairat (Kazakhstan)	2 – 1 (4 – 2 agg.)	(Bosnia and Herzegovina) Široki Brijeg	Almaty, Kazakhstan
20:30 (UTC+6)	Suyumbayev (yellow card) 42'; Kuat (yellow card) 80' (goal) 90+3'; Mikanović (yellow card) 88'; Akhmetov (yellow card) 89'; Dugalić (yellow card) 89'; Orazov 90+2'	Report	D.Kovačić (yellow card) 35'; Bagarić (yellow card) 80' (goal) 90' (pen.)	Stadium: Central Stadium; Attendance: 18,500; Referee: Denys Shurman (Ukraine)

26 July 2019 Second qualifying round 1st leg	Hapoel Be'er Sheva (Israel)	2 – 0	(Kazakhstan) Kairat	Be'er Sheva, Israel
01:30 (UTC+6)	Ramzi 10' (pen.); Kabha (yellow card) 29'; Shamir (yellow card) 42' (goal) 63'; Vítor (yellow card) 48'; Marín (yellow card) 70'	Report	Akhmetov (yellow card) 50'; Dugalić (yellow card) 77'; Kuat (yellow card) 90+2'; Seydakhmet (yellow card) 90+2'	Stadium: Turner Stadium; Attendance: 8,167; Referee: Ricardo de Burgos Bengoetxea (Spain)

1 August 2019 Second qualifying round 2nd leg	Kairat (Kazakhstan)	1 – 1 (1 – 3 agg.)	(Israel) Hapoel Be'er Sheva	Almaty, Kazakhstan
20:30 (UTC+6)	Dugalić (yellow card) 31' (goal) 40'; Akhmetov (yellow card) 32' (yellow-red card) 55'; Mikanović (yellow card) 36'; Abiken (yellow card) 42'; Suyumbayev (yellow card) 66' (yellow-red card) 90+6'; Eppel (yellow card) 86'; Plotnikov (red card) 88'; Kuat (yellow card) 90+4'	Report	Kabha (yellow card) 45+2'; Hasselbaink (yellow card) 46'; Dugalić 63' (o.g.)	Stadium: Central Stadium; Attendance: 23,000; Referee: Ola Hobber Nilsen (Norway)

== Squad statistics ==
As of match played 10 November 2019

=== Appearances and goals ===
No.	Pos	Nat	Player	Total		Premier League		Kazakhstan Cup		Super Cup		Europa League	
No.	Pos	Nat	Player	Apps	Goals	Apps	Goals	Apps	Goals	Apps	Goals	Apps	Goals
1	GK	(Kazakhstan) KAZ	Vladimir Plotnikov	5	0	3	0	2	0	0	0	0	0
2	DF	(Kazakhstan) KAZ	Yeldos Akhmetov	13	0	7	0	1	0	1	0	4	0
4	DF	(Kazakhstan) KAZ	Nuraly Alip	21	0	19+1	0	1	0	0	0	0	0
5	DF	(Kazakhstan) KAZ	Gafurzhan Suyumbayev	30	2	22+2	2	2	0	0	0	4	0
6	DF	(Belarus) BLR	Syarhey Palitsevich	10	0	10	0	0	0	0	0	0	0
7	MF	(Kazakhstan) KAZ	Islambek Kuat	32	1	21+5	0	1	0	1	0	3+1	1
8	MF	(Kazakhstan) KAZ	Georgy Zhukov	30	2	25+1	2	0	0	0	0	4	0
9	MF	(Kazakhstan) KAZ	Bauyrzhan Islamkhan	27	7	18+4	7	1	0	0	0	4	0
10	FW	(Kazakhstan) KAZ	Yerkebulan Seydakhmet	16	1	10+3	1	0	0	0	0	2+1	0
11	FW	(Ukraine) UKR	Aderinsola Eseola	32	21	21+6	19	0	0	1	0	4	2
13	MF	(South Korea) KOR	Han Jeong-uh	6	0	2+3	0	0	0	1	0	0	0
14	MF	(Kazakhstan) KAZ	Aybol Abiken	35	4	22+6	4	2	0	1	0	4	0
16	DF	(Kazakhstan) KAZ	Sergey Keyler	16	0	9+4	0	0+1	0	0+1	0	0+1	0
17	MF	(Kazakhstan) KAZ	Yerkebulan Tungyshbayev	16	0	4+10	0	1	0	0+1	0	0	0
18	MF	(Poland) POL	Konrad Wrzesiński	30	3	23+2	3	0	0	1	0	2+2	0
19	FW	(Hungary) HUN	Márton Eppel	31	16	19+9	16	0	0	0	0	0+3	0
20	DF	(Serbia) SRB	Rade Dugalić	35	6	30	5	0	0	1	0	4	1
22	MF	(Montenegro) MNE	Nebojša Kosović	18	0	8+9	0	0	0	0	0	0+1	0
23	FW	(Kazakhstan) KAZ	Vyacheslav Shvyrev	13	2	0+10	2	2	0	1	0	0	0
24	DF	(Croatia) CRO	Dino Mikanović	36	1	31	1	0	0	1	0	4	0
26	MF	(Kazakhstan) KAZ	Ramazan Orazov	26	1	12+8	0	1	0	0+1	0	1+3	1
27	GK	(Kazakhstan) KAZ	Stas Pokatilov	35	0	30	0	0	0	1	0	4	0
35	MF	(Kazakhstan) KAZ	Aibarr Nurdaliyev	1	0	0	0	0+1	0	0	0	0	0
36	MF	(Kazakhstan) KAZ	Adam Adakhajiev	3	0	0+1	0	1+1	0	0	0	0	0
37	DF	(Kazakhstan) KAZ	Madi Aitore	2	0	0	0	1+1	0	0	0	0	0
39	FW	(Kazakhstan) KAZ	Sultanbek Astanov	12	2	6+4	1	1+1	1	0	0	0	0
47	FW	(Kazakhstan) KAZ	Damir Bitussupov	1	0	0	0	1	0	0	0	0	0
54	FW	(Kazakhstan) KAZ	Artur Shushenachev	4	1	0+3	1	0+1	0	0	0	0	0
Players away from Kairat on loan:
15	DF	(Kazakhstan) KAZ	Aleksandr Sokolenko	2	0	0	0	2	0	0	0	0	0
25	FW	(Kazakhstan) KAZ	Samat Sarsenov	7	1	1+4	0	1+1	1	0	0	0	0
28	FW	(Kazakhstan) KAZ	Rifat Nurmugamet	1	1	1	1	0	0	0	0	0	0
Players who left Kairat during the season:
3	DF	(Kazakhstan) KAZ	Yan Vorogovskiy	14	0	10+2	0	1	0	1	0	0	0

=== Goal scorers ===
Place	Position	Nation	Number	Name	Premier League	Kazakhstan Cup	Super Cup	Europa League	Total
1	FW	(Ukraine)	11	Aderinsola Eseola	19	0	0	2	21
2	FW	(Hungary)	19	Márton Eppel	16	0	0	0	16
3	MF	(Kazakhstan)	9	Bauyrzhan Islamkhan	7	0	0	0	7
4	DF	(Serbia)	20	Rade Dugalić	5	0	0	1	6
5	MF	(Kazakhstan)	14	Aybol Abiken	4	0	0	0	4
6	MF	(Poland)	18	Konrad Wrzesiński	3	0	0	0	3
7	FW	(Kazakhstan)	23	Vyacheslav Shvyrev	2	0	0	0	2
7	DF	(Kazakhstan)	5	Gafurzhan Suyumbayev	2	0	0	0	2
7	MF	(Kazakhstan)	8	Georgy Zhukov	2	0	0	0	2
7	FW	(Kazakhstan)	39	Sultanbek Astanov	1	1	0	0	2
11	FW	(Kazakhstan)	28	Rifat Nurmugamet	1	0	0	0	1
11	DF	(Croatia)	24	Dino Mikanović	1	0	0	0	1
11	FW	(Kazakhstan)	10	Yerkebulan Seydakhmet	1	0	0	0	1
11	FW	(Kazakhstan)	54	Artur Shushenachev	1	0	0	0	1
11	FW	(Kazakhstan)	25	Samat Sarsenov	0	1	0	0	1
11	MF	(Kazakhstan)	26	Ramazan Orazov	0	0	0	1	1
11	MF	(Kazakhstan)	7	Islambek Kuat	0	0	0	1	1
				TOTALS	65	2	0	5	72

=== Disciplinary record ===
Number	Nation	Position	Name	Premier League		Kazakhstan Cup		Super Cup		Europa League		Total	
Number	Nation	Position	Name	Yellow card	Red card	Yellow card	Red card	Yellow card	Red card	Yellow card	Red card	Yellow card	Red card
1	(Kazakhstan)	GK	Vladimir Plotnikov	1	0	0	0	0	0	0	1	1	1
2	(Kazakhstan)	DF	Yeldos Akhmetov	3	0	0	1	0	0	5	1	8	2
4	(Kazakhstan)	DF	Nuraly Alip	4	0	0	1	0	0	0	0	4	1
5	(Kazakhstan)	DF	Gafurzhan Suyumbayev	7	0	1	0	0	0	3	1	11	1
6	(Belarus)	DF	Syarhey Palitsevich	4	0	0	0	0	0	0	0	4	0
7	(Kazakhstan)	MF	Islambek Kuat	12	0	0	0	1	0	3	0	16	0
8	(Kazakhstan)	MF	Georgy Zhukov	3	0	0	0	0	0	1	0	4	0
9	(Kazakhstan)	MF	Bauyrzhan Islamkhan	2	0	0	0	0	0	0	0	2	0
10	(Kazakhstan)	FW	Yerkebulan Seydakhmet	1	0	0	0	0	0	1	0	2	0
11	(Ukraine)	FW	Aderinsola Eseola	8	0	0	0	0	1	0	0	8	1
13	(South Korea)	MF	Han Jeong-uh	1	0	0	0	0	0	0	0	1	0
14	(Kazakhstan)	MF	Aybol Abiken	12	0	1	0	0	0	2	0	15	0
16	(Kazakhstan)	DF	Sergey Keyler	2	0	0	0	0	0	0	0	2	0
18	(Poland)	MF	Konrad Wrzesiński	1	0	0	0	0	0	0	0	1	0
19	(Hungary)	FW	Márton Eppel	7	0	0	0	0	0	1	0	8	0
20	(Serbia)	DF	Rade Dugalić	6	0	0	0	0	0	3	0	9	0
22	(Montenegro)	MF	Nebojša Kosović	4	1	0	0	0	0	1	0	5	1
23	(Kazakhstan)	FW	Vyacheslav Shvyrev	1	0	1	0	0	0	0	0	2	0
24	(Croatia)	DF	Dino Mikanović	3	0	0	0	1	0	2	0	6	0
26	(Kazakhstan)	MF	Ramazan Orazov	6	0	0	0	0	0	1	0	7	0
27	(Kazakhstan)	GK	Stas Pokatilov	2	0	0	0	0	0	0	0	2	0
39	(Kazakhstan)	FW	Sultanbek Astanov	1	0	0	0	0	0	0	0	1	0
Players away on loan:
25	(Kazakhstan)	FW	Samat Sarsenov	2	0	1	0	0	0	0	0	3	0
28	(Kazakhstan)	FW	Rifat Nurmugamet	1	0	0	0	0	0	0	0	1	0
Players who left Kairat during the season:
3	(Kazakhstan)	DF	Yan Vorogovskiy	3	1	0	0	0	0	0	0	3	1
			TOTALS	97	2	4	2	2	1	23	3	126	8
