= List of FC Astana managers =

This is a list of all managers of FC Astana.

== Managerial history ==
As of match played 31 October 2026, Managers in italics were hired as caretakers.

Manager name	From	To	Duration	P	W	D	L	GF	GA	Win %	Honours
(Kazakhstan) Vakhid Masudov	1 January 2009	16 February 2009	46 days	0	0	0	0	0	0	0	-
(Russia) Sergei Yuran	16 February 2009	24 January 2010	342 days	26	20	0	6	54	24	76.92	-
(Germany) Holger Fach	24 January 2010	11 November 2011	1 year, 291 days	71	36	16	19	101	67	50.7	Kazakhstan Cup (1): 2010; Kazakhstan Super Cup (1): 2011
(Ukraine) Oleh Protasov	12 November 2011	27 April 2012	167 days	7	2	1	4	10	13	28.57	-
(Czech Republic) Miroslav Beránek	4 May 2012	13 July 2013	1 year, 70 days	40	27	11	12	73	47	67.5	Kazakhstan Cup (1): 2012
(Kazakhstan) Grigori Babayan	13 July 2013	21 July 2013	8 days	2	1	0	1	4	3	50	-
(Romania) Ioan Andone	22 July 2013	27 November 2013	128 days	12	8	1	3	21	12	66.67	-
(Uzbekistan) Vadim Abramov	28 November 2013	13 December 2013	15 days	0	0	0	0	0	0	0	-
(Kazakhstan) Grigori Babayan	1 January 2014	23 June 2014	173 days	19	10	6	3	30	15	52.63	-
(Bulgaria) Stanimir Stoilov	23 June 2014	1 March 2018	3 years, 250 days	174	102	39	33	301	175	58.29	Kazakhstan Premier League (4): 2014, 2015, 2016, 2017; Kazakhstan Cup (1): 2016; Kazakhstan Super Cup (1): 2015
(Kazakhstan) Grigori Babayan	1 March 2018	1 June 2018	92 days	19	13	2	4	39	17	68.42	Kazakhstan Super Cup (1): 2018
(Ukraine) Roman Hryhorchuk	1 June 2018	13 January 2020	1 year, 226 days	62	37	8	17	112	63	59.68	Kazakhstan Premier League (2): 2018, 2019; Kazakhstan Super Cup (1): 2019
(Kazakhstan) Grigori Babayan	17 August 2018	4 January 2019	140 days	19	10	4	5	29	17	52.63	Kazakhstan Premier League (1): 2018
(Czech Republic) Michal Bílek	14 January 2020	26 August 2020	225 days	7	4	1	2	14	11	57.14	Kazakhstan Super Cup (1): 2020
(England) Paul Ashworth	26 August 2020	7 October 2020	42 days	9	3	2	4	12	15	33.33	-
(Russia) Andrey Tikhonov	16 October 2020	5 November 2021	1 year, 20 days	45	25	11	9	82	50	55.56	-
(Kazakhstan) Nurken Mazbaev	23 April 2021	2 May 2021	9 days	3	3	0	0	4	0	100	-
(Russia) Vladimir Yezhurov	5 November 2021	20 November 2021	15 days	2	0	0	2	0	6	0	-
(Serbia) Srđan Blagojević	21 November 2021	13 September 2022	296 days	28	15	7	6	60	30	53.57	-
(Kazakhstan) Grigori Babayan	13 September 2022		4 years, 50 days	164	88	37	39	278	176	53.66	Kazakhstan Premier League (1): 2022; Kazakhstan Super Cup (1): 2023; Kazakhstan League Cup (1): 2024
