= 2019 Kazakhstan Super Cup =

Astana	Kairat
2	0
- Date: 3 March 2019
- Venue: Central Stadium, Almaty
- Referee: Igor Chesnokov
- Attendance: 16,000

2019 Kazakhstan Super Cup was a Kazakhstan football match that was played on 3 March 2019 between the champions of 2018 Kazakhstan Premier League, Astana, and the winner of the 2018 Kazakhstan Cup, Kairat.

== Match details ==
3 March 2019
15:00 UTC+06:00

Astana	2 – 0	Kairat
Kabananga 7', 65'	Report

Central Stadium, Almaty
Attendance: 16,000
Referee: Igor Chesnokov

Astana	Kairat

GK	1	(Kazakhstan) Nenad Erić
DF	2	(Serbia) Antonio Rukavina
DF	5	(Bosnia and Herzegovina) Marin Aničić
DF	15	(Kazakhstan) Abzal Beisebekov	(yellow card) 45'	(substituted off) 46'
DF	27	(Kazakhstan) Yuriy Logvinenko
DF	44	(Russia) Evgeni Postnikov	(yellow card) 56'
MF	14	(Croatia) Marin Tomasov
MF	18	(Belarus) Ivan Mayewski
FW	9	(Romania) Dorin Rotariu		(substituted off) 90+4'
FW	30	(Democratic Republic of the Congo) Junior Kabananga		(substituted off) 78'
FW	45	(Kazakhstan) Roman Murtazayev
Substitutes:
GK	31	(Kazakhstan) Danil Podymksy
GK	53	(Kazakhstan) Stanislav Pavlov
MF	7	(Kazakhstan) Serikzhan Muzhikov
DF	24	(Croatia) Luka Šimunović
MF	28	(Kazakhstan) Yuriy Pertsukh		(substituted in) 90+4'
FW	32	(Curaçao) Rangelo Janga		(substituted in) 78'
DF	77	(Kazakhstan) Dmitri Shomko		(substituted in) 46'
FW	80	(Kazakhstan) Vladislav Prokopenko
FW	91	(Kazakhstan) Sergei Khizhnichenko
Manager:
(Ukraine) Roman Hryhorchuk

GK	27	(Kazakhstan) Stas Pokatilov
DF	2	(Kazakhstan) Yeldos Akhmetov		(substituted off) 71'
DF	3	(Kazakhstan) Yan Vorogovskiy
DF	20	(Serbia) Rade Dugalić
DF	24	(Croatia) Dino Mikanović	(yellow card) 57'
MF	7	(Kazakhstan) Islambek Kuat	(yellow card) 61'
MF	13	(South Korea) Han Jeong-uh		(substituted off) 65'
MF	14	(Kazakhstan) Aybol Abiken		(substituted off) 50'
MF	18	(Poland) Konrad Wrzesiński
FW	11	(Ukraine) Aderinsola Eseola	(red card) 84'
FW	23	(Kazakhstan) Vyacheslav Shvyrev
Substitutes:
GK	1	(Kazakhstan) Vladimir Plotnikov
GK	30	(Kazakhstan) Danil Ustimenko
MF	8	(Kazakhstan) Georgy Zhukov
DF	15	(Kazakhstan) Aleksandr Sokolenko
DF	16	(Kazakhstan) Sergey Keyler		(substituted in) 71'
MF	17	(Kazakhstan) Yerkebulan Tungyshbayev		(substituted in) 65'
FW	19	(Hungary) Márton Eppel
MF	26	(Kazakhstan) Ramazan Orazov		(substituted in) 50'
FW	28	(Kazakhstan) Rifat Nurmugamet
Manager:
(Belarus) Aleksey Shpilevsky

== See also ==
- 2018 Kazakhstan Premier League
- 2018 Kazakhstan Cup
