= Yuri Utkulbayev =

Russian footballer

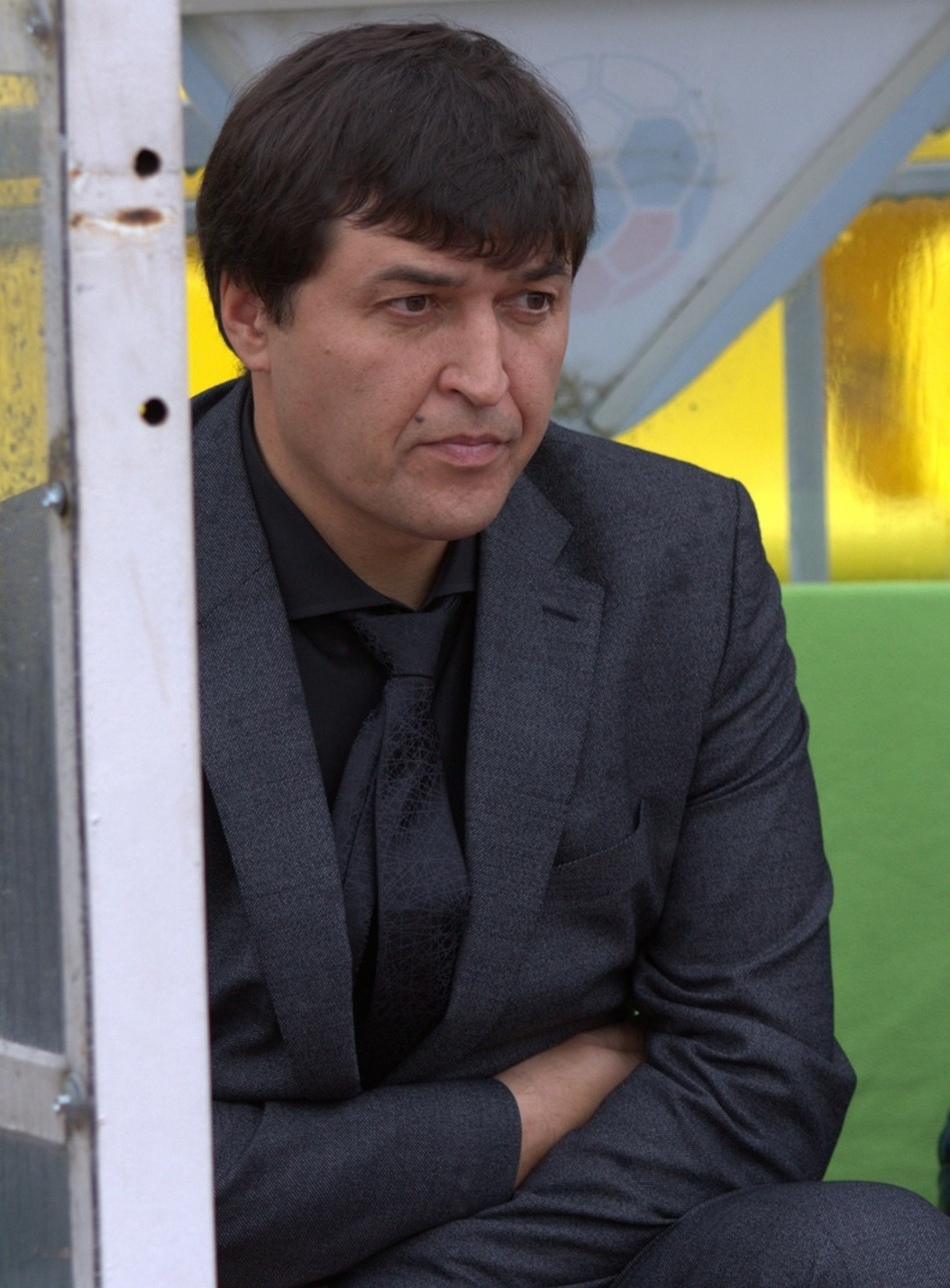
- Utkulbayev coaching Neftekhimik in 2017

Personal information
- Full name: Yuri Anvarovich Utkulbayev
- Date of birth: 16 December 1969 (age 56)
- Place of birth: Kazan, Russian SFSR
- Height: 1.87 m (6 ft 1 1/2 in)
- Position: Goalkeeper

Youth career
- Rubin Kazan
- DYuSSh Tasma Kazan

Senior career*
Years	Team	Apps	(Gls)
1989–1990	Torpedo-klubnaya Miass		
1991	Torpedo Miass	24	(0)
1992–1993	Neftekhimik Nizhnekamsk	50	(0)
1994	Irtysh Tobolsk	21	(0)
1995–1997	Rubin Kazan	75	(0)
1998–1999	Rubin-2 Kazan		
1999–2001	Privolzhanin Kazan (futsal)		

Managerial career
- 1995–2012: Rubin Kazan (assistant)
- 2012: KAMAZ (director of sports)
- 2014–2015: Rubin-2 Kazan
- 2015: Rubin Kazan (Under-21)
- 2015: Rubin Kazan (caretaker)
- 2015–2016: Aktobe
- 2016–2020: Neftekhimik Nizhnekamsk
- 2022–2023: Rubin Kazan
- * Club domestic league appearances and goals

Yuri Anvarovich Utkulbayev (Russian: Юрий Анварович Уткульбаев; born 16 December 1969) is a Russian football manager and a former player.

== Coaching career ==
Since December 2015 till 2016, he worked as a manager of Aktobe.

In late 2022, Utkulbayev was appointed head coach of Russian First League club Rubin Kazan. He left Rubin by mutual consent in April 2023.
