= Gafurzhan Suyumbayev =

Kazakhstani footballer

Personal information
- Full name: Gafurzhan Sabyrzhanuly Suyumbayev
- Date of birth: 19 August 1990 (age 36)
- Place of birth: Shymkent, Kazakh SSR, Soviet Union
- Height: 1.75 m (5 ft 9 in)
- Position: Defender

Senior career*
Years	Team	Apps	(Gls)
2010–2016	Ordabasy	113	(3)
2013	→ Irtysh Pavlodar (loan)	14	(0)
2016–2022	Kairat	126	(9)
2022–2023	Aksu	24	(1)
2023–2024	Ordabasy	37	(2)
2025	Irtysh Pavlodar	0	(0)
Total		314	(15)

International career
2014–2022	Kazakhstan	42	(4)
- * Club domestic league appearances and goals

Gafurzhan Sabyrzhanuly Suyumbayev (Kazakh: Ғафуржан Сабыржанұлы Сүйімбаев, Ğafurjan Sabyrjanūly Süiımbaev; born 19 August 1990) is a former Kazakh football player who played as a defender.

== Career ==
=== Club ===
In July 2016, Suyumbayev signed for FC Kairat. On 19 January 2022, Kairat announced that Suyumbayev had left the club.

== Career statistics ==
=== Club ===
As of match played 21 July 2021

Appearances and goals by club, season and competition
Club	Season	League			National Cup		Continental		Other		Total	
Club	Season	Division	Apps	Goals	Apps	Goals	Apps	Goals	Apps	Goals	Apps	Goals
Irtysh Pavlodar (loan)	2013	Kazakhstan Premier League	14	0	2	0	1 (Note: Appearances in the UEFA Europa League)	0	—		17	0
Kairat	2016	Kazakhstan Premier League	13	2	3	1	2	0	0 (Note: Appearances in the Kazakhstan Super Cup)	0	18	3
Kairat	2017	Kazakhstan Premier League	32	2	4	0	4	0	1	0	41	2
Kairat	2018	Kazakhstan Premier League	27	1	2	0	5	0	1	0	35	1
Kairat	2019	Kazakhstan Premier League	24	2	2	0	4	0	0	0	30	2
Kairat	2020	Kazakhstan Premier League	16	1	0	0	1	0	—		17	1
Kairat	2021	Kazakhstan Premier League	14	1	0	0	3 (Note: 3 appearances in the UEFA Champions League, 0 appearances in the UEFA Europa League, and 0 appearances in the UEFA Europa Conference League)	0	0	0	17	1
Kairat	Total		126	9	13	1	19	0	2	0	160	10
Career total			140	9	15	1	20	0	2	0	177	10

=== International ===
Kazakhstan national team
Year	Apps	Goals
2014	3	0
2015	6	0
2016	5	1
2017	2	0
Total	16	1

Statistics accurate as of match played 26 March 2017

=== International goals ===
Scores and results list Kazakhstan's goal tally first.

Goal	Date	Venue	Opponent	Score	Result	Competition
1.	11 November 2016	Parken Stadium, Copenhagen, Denmark	Denmark	1–1	1–4	2018 FIFA World Cup qualification
2.	15 November 2018	Astana Arena, Astana, Kazakhstan	Latvia	1–0	1–1	2018–19 UEFA Nations League D
3.	11 June 2019	Astana Arena, Nur-Sultan, Kazakhstan	San Marino	3–0	4–0	UEFA Euro 2020 qualification
4.	16 November 2019	Stadio Olimpico di Serravalle, San Marino	San Marino	2–0	3-1	UEFA Euro 2020 qualification
