= Han Jeong-woo =

South Korean footballer (born 1998)

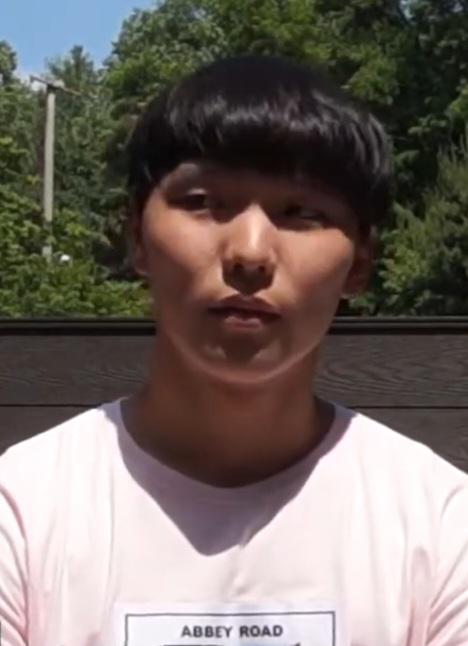

Personal information
- Date of birth: 26 December 1998 (age 27)
- Place of birth: South Korea
- Height: 1.72 m (5 ft 7 1/2 in)
- Position: Midfielder

Team information
- Current team: Namyangju

College career
Years	Team	Apps	(Gls)
2014–2016	Yongun High School		
2017–2018	Soongsil University		

Senior career*
Years	Team	Apps	(Gls)
2019	Gyeongnam	0	(0)
2019–2020	Kairat	5	(0)
2020	Suwon	18	(1)
2021	Dundalk	14	(1)
2022	Gimpo	18	(1)
2023	Veroskronos Tsuno	1	(0)
2024–	Namyangju	16	(5)

International career
2016	South Korea U20	1	(0)
2019–2020	South Korea U23	2 (Note: Includes one appearance against another KFA team.)	(0)
- * Club domestic league appearances and goals as of 29 December 2024

Han Jeong-woo (Korean: 한정우 also known as Han Jeong-uh; born 26 December 1998) is a South Korean footballer who plays as midfielder for Namyangju in the K4 League.

== Career ==
=== FC Kairat ===
On 26 January 2019, FC Kairat announced the signing of Han on a two-year contract. On 6 January 2020, Kairat announced via Instagram that Han had been released by the club.

=== Suwon FC ===
On 9 January 2020, Han was announced as a new signing for Suwon FC of the K League 2. Han made 18 appearances for Suwon FC over the season, scoring 1 goal, as they won promotion to the K League 1 by finishing second.

=== Dundalk ===
Han made the move to Europe on 25 March 2021, signing for League of Ireland Premier Division club Dundalk. He made his debut a day later, coming off the bench in a 2–1 defeat to Finn Harps at Oriel Park. Han scored his first goal in Ireland on 24 April 2021, scoring the winning goal in a 2–1 win at home to Drogheda United in the Louth Derby. He scored his first goal in European competition on 8 July 2021, scoring a late header in a 4–0 win over Welsh side Newtown in the UEFA Europa Conference League. He made a total of 18 appearances in all competitions during his time with the club, scoring 3 goals.

== Career statistics ==
=== Club ===
As of match played 5 October 2024.

Appearances and goals by club, season and competition
Club	Season	League			National Cup (Note: Includes Kazakhstan Cup, Korean FA Cup & FAI Cup)		Continental		Other		Total	
Club	Season	Division	Apps	Goals	Apps	Goals	Apps	Goals	Apps	Goals	Apps	Goals
Kairat	2019	Kazakhstan Premier League	5	0	0	0	0 (Note: Appearances in UEFA Europa League)	0	1 (Note: Appearances in Kazakhstan Super Cup)	0	6	0
Suwon	2020	K League 2	18	1	0	0	—		—		18	1
Dundalk	2021	League of Ireland Premier Division	14	1	2	1	2 (Note: Appearances in UEFA Europa Conference League)	1	—		18	3
Gimpo	2022	K League 2	18	1	0	0	—		—		18	1
Veroskronos Tsuno	2023	Kyushu Soccer League	1	0	0	0	—		—		1	0
Namyangju	2024	K4 League	16	5	0	0	—		—		16	5
Career total			72	8	2	1	2	1	1	0	77	10
