= Konrad Wrzesiński =

Polish footballer

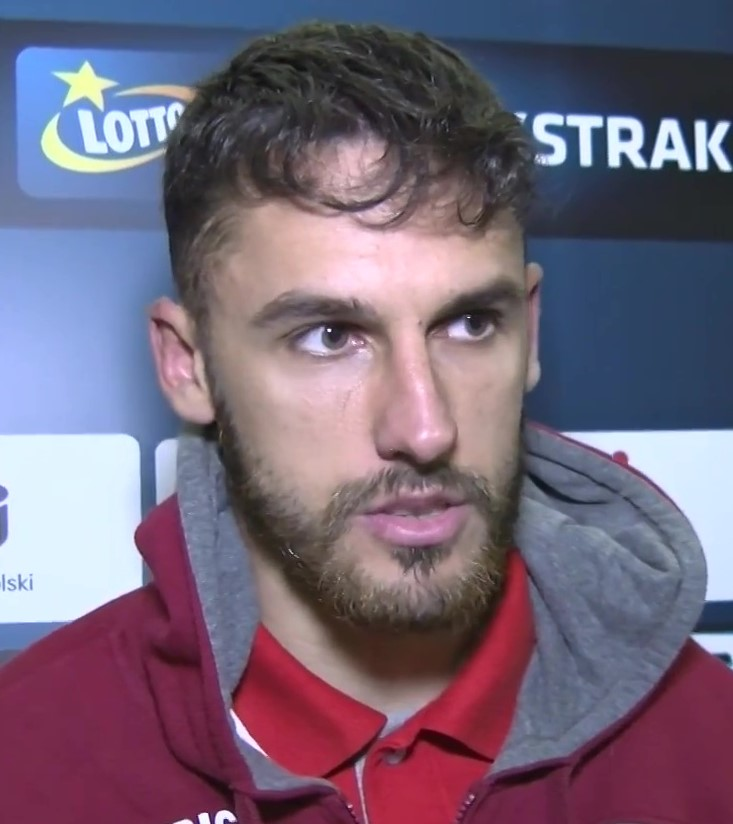

Personal information
- Date of birth: 10 September 1993 (age 33)
- Place of birth: Pułtusk, Poland
- Height: 1.77 m (5 ft 10 in)
- Position: Midfielder

Youth career
- –2009: Sokół Serock
- 2009–2011: Junior Ursynów

Senior career*
Years	Team	Apps	(Gls)
2011	UKS Łady		
2012	KP Piaseczno	12	(0)
2012–2013	Polonia Warsaw	3	(0)
2013–2014	Motor Lublin	28	(5)
2014–2015	Widzew Łódź	31	(2)
2015–2016	Podbeskidzie	0	(0)
2015–2016	→ Pogoń Siedlce (loan)	32	(3)
2016–2017	Pogoń Siedlce	27	(6)
2017–2018	Zagłębie Sosnowiec	53	(3)
2019–2020	Kairat	36	(6)
2021–2022	Jagiellonia Białystok	7	(0)
2021–2022	Jagiellonia Białystok II	14	(0)
2021–2022	→ Stal Mielec (loan)	18	(1)
2023–2024	Zagłębie Sosnowiec	37	(1)
2024–2025	Mazovia Mińsk Mazowiecki	22	(0)
- * Club domestic league appearances and goals as of 20:23, 20 June 2025 (UTC)

Konrad Wrzesiński (born 10 September 1993) is a Polish professional footballer playing as a midfielder. Besides Poland, he has played in Kazakhstan.

== Career ==
On 22 January 2019, Wrzesiński signed for Kazakhstan Premier League club Kairat. He won the national championship with this club.

On 16 March 2021, he signed for Ekstraklasa club Jagiellonia Białystok until June 2023.

On 1 September 2021, Wrzesiński was loaned to Stal Mielec for one year.

On 31 December 2022, he terminated his contract with Jagiellonia.

Shortly after, on 5 January 2023, I liga club Zagłębie Sosnowiec announced they have re-signed Wrzesiński on a deal until June 2024. After Zagłębie was relegated to the II liga at the end of the 2023–24 season, Wrzesiński left the club.

On 10 September 2024, his 31st birthday, he joined IV liga Masovia club Mazovia Mińsk Mazowiecki. He was released at the end of the 2024–25 season.

== Career statistics ==
As of match played 14 June 2025

Appearances and goals by club, season and competition
Club	Season	League			National cup (Note: Includes Polish Cup)		Europe		Other		Total	
Club	Season	Division	Apps	Goals	Apps	Goals	Apps	Goals	Apps	Goals	Apps	Goals
MKS Piaseczno	2011–12	III liga, gr. A	12	0	—		—		—		12	0
Polonia Warsaw	2012–13	Ekstraklasa	3	0	0	0	—		—		3	0
Motor Lublin	2013–14	II liga	28	5	0	0	—		—		28	5
Widzew Łódź	2014–15	I liga	31	2	0	0	—		—		31	2
Pogoń Siedlce (loan)	2015–16	I liga	32	3	2	1	—		—		34	4
Pogoń Siedlce	2016–17	I liga	27	6	2	0	—		—		29	6
Pogoń Siedlce	Total		59	9	4	1	—		—		63	10
Zagłębie Sosnowiec	2017–18	I liga	33	0	2	0	—		—		35	0
Zagłębie Sosnowiec	2018–19	Ekstraklasa	20	3	0	0	—		—		20	3
Zagłębie Sosnowiec	Total		53	3	2	0	—		—		55	3
Kairat	2019	Kazakhstan Premier League	25	3	0	0	4 (Note: Appearances in UEFA Europa League)	0	1 (Note: Appearance in Kazakhstan Super Cup)	0	30	3
Kairat	2020	Kazakhstan Premier League	11	3	0	0	2	0	—		13	3
Kairat	Total		36	6	0	0	6	0	1	0	43	6
Jagiellonia Białystok	2020–21	Ekstraklasa	7	0	—		—		—		7	0
Jagiellonia II	2020–21	III liga, gr. I	2	0	—		—		—		2	0
Jagiellonia II	2021–22	III liga, gr. I	3	0	—		—		—		3	0
Jagiellonia II	2022–23	III liga, gr. I	9	0	—		—		—		9	0
Jagiellonia II	Total		14	0	—		—		—		14	0
Stal Mielec (loan)	2021–22	Ekstraklasa	18	1	1	0	—		—		19	0
Zagłębie Sosnowiec	2022–23	I liga	13	1	—		—		—		13	1
Zagłębie Sosnowiec	2023–24	I liga	24	0	1	0	—		—		25	0
Zagłębie Sosnowiec	Total		37	1	1	0	—		—		38	1
Mazovia Mińsk Mazowiecki	2024–25	IV liga Masovia	22	0	—		—		—		22	0
Career total			320	27	8	1	6	0	1	0	335	28

== Honours ==
Kairat

- Kazakhstan Premier League: 2020

Mazovia Mińsk Mazowiecki

- Polish Cup (Siedlce regionals): 2024–25
