= Dorin Rotariu =

Romanian footballer (born 1995)

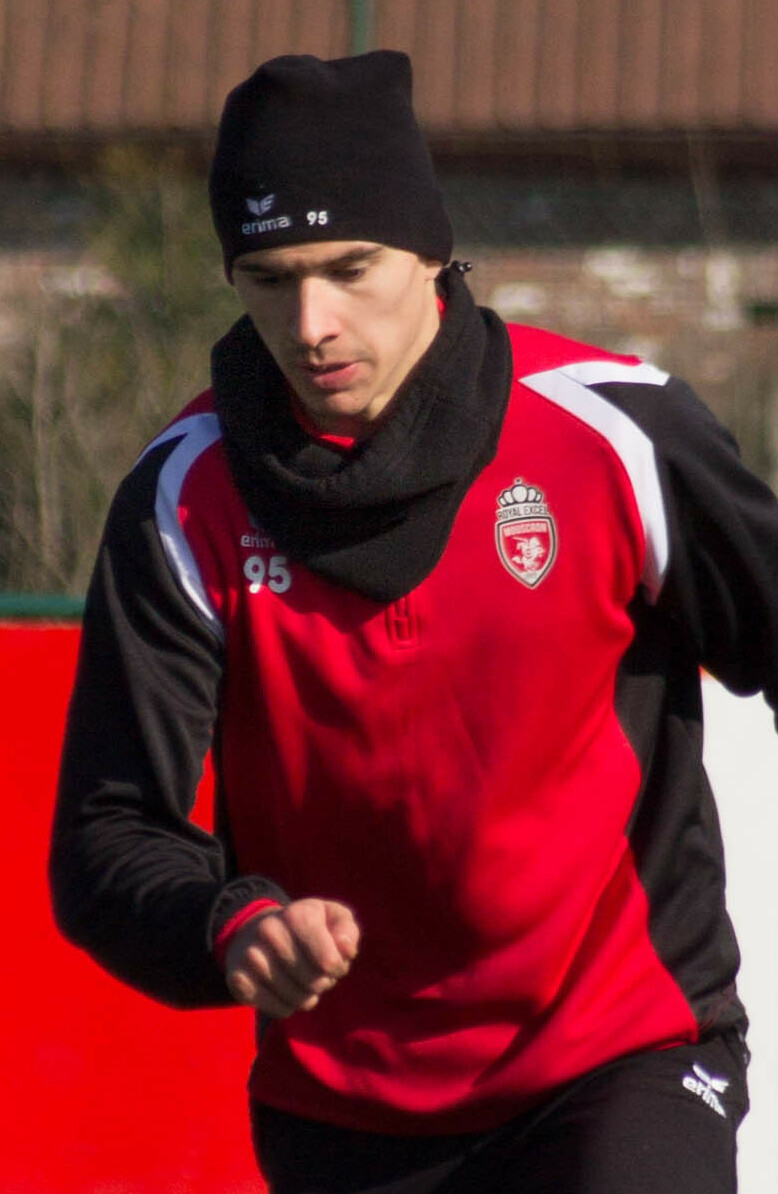
- Rotariu with Mouscron in 2018

Personal information
- Date of birth: 29 July 1995 (age 31)
- Place of birth: Timișoara, Romania
- Height: 1.80 m (5 ft 11 in)
- Positions: Right winger; forward

Youth career
- 2007–2012: Politehnica Timișoara

Senior career*
Years	Team	Apps	(Gls)
2012–2013	Politehnica Timișoara	0	(0)
2012–2013	→ Dinamo II București (loan)	5	(2)
2012–2013	→ Dinamo București (loan)	7	(0)
2013–2017	Dinamo București	115	(22)
2017–2019	Club Brugge	12	(1)
2017–2018	→ Mouscron (loan)	28	(9)
2018–2019	→ AZ Alkmaar (loan)	8	(0)
2019–2021	Astana	44	(8)
2021–2023	Ludogorets Razgrad	6	(1)
2021	Ludogorets Razgrad II	1	(0)
2022–2023	→ Atromitos (loan)	39	(4)
2023–2024	FCSB	5	(0)
2024–2025	Ankaragücü	30	(6)
2025–2026	Iğdır	17	(0)
2026	Eyüpspor	4	(0)

International career
2013–2014	Romania U19	8	(0)
2014–2016	Romania U21	14	(0)
2016–2019	Romania	10	(1)
- * Club domestic league appearances and goals as of 17 May 2026

Dorin Rotariu (Romanian pronunciation: [doˈrin roˈtarju, - rotaˈri.u]; born 29 July 1995) is a Romanian professional footballer who plays as a right winger or forward.

Rotariu moved from his boyhood club Politehnica Timișoara to Dinamo București in 2012, aged 17. He amassed over 120 Liga I appearances for "the White and Reds" over the course of several seasons, and in 2017 earned a transfer abroad to Club Brugge in Belgium. Two years later, after being loaned out to Mouscron and AZ Alkmaar, Rotariu joined Kazakh team Astana with which he won three domestic honours. He also competed professionally in Bulgaria and Greece, for Ludogorets Razgrad and Atromitos, respectively, before returning to Romania with FCSB in 2023.

Internationally, Rotariu made his full debut for Romania in a 5–0 FIFA World Cup qualifier victory over Armenia in October 2016, and scored his first goal in a 1–0 friendly win over Sweden in March 2018.

== Club career ==
=== Early career and Dinamo București ===
Rotariu played as a youngster for FC Politehnica Timișoara's academy, and in September 2012 was loaned to top-flight club Dinamo București. Several other teams had previously wished to sign him, including ACS Poli Timișoara—the supposed successor of FC Politehnica which was dissolved during the same month of the player's transfer. Rotariu chose to join Dinamo București in order to play alongside teammates from the national under-19 squad. He stayed with the reserve team before making his Liga I debut against Concordia Chiajna in March 2013, aged only 17 years and eight months.

After his loan expired in the summer of 2013, Dinamo București reached a full transfer agreement with the owner of the defunct FC Politehnica society, Marian Iancu, despite interest from fellow league side FC Vaslui. Rotariu was signed as a free agent, but the capital-based club promised to pay 50% of a future transfer fee to the businessman. On the eve of his 18th birthday, Rotariu recorded his first goal in a match against FC Vaslui, which ended 2–0. On 11 August 2013, he netted in a derby against FC Steaua București. Twelve days later, he scored again in a 6–0 victory over Universitatea Cluj.

Rotariu was the most efficient young player in the first part of the 2016–17 Liga I campaign, having scored six goals and offering one assist.

=== Club Brugge ===
On 31 January 2017, the last day of the winter transfer window in Belgium, it was announced that Rotariu signed a three-and-a-half-year deal for an undisclosed fee with defending champions Club Brugge. He made his Belgian Pro League debut five days later, entering the pitch as an 80th-minute substitute in a 1–0 home victory over Charleroi at the Jan Breydel Stadium. His first goal came in a 2–1 home success over Zulte Waregem, on 1 May.

==== Loans to Mouscron and AZ Alkmaar ====
Rotariu agreed to a season-long loan deal with Royal Excel Mouscron on 31 August 2017, rejoining his former Dinamo București coach Mircea Rednic. He recorded his first goals in a Belgian Cup match with Tubize on 20 September, netting twice in the 3–1 win. Rotariu was again loaned for the following campaign, this time to Dutch club AZ Alkmaar.

=== Astana ===
After a move to 2. Bundesliga side Arminia Bielefeld fell through, Kazakh team FC Astana announced the transfer of Rotariu on a four-year contract on 26 February 2019. He made his competitive debut on 3 March, as Astana won 2–0 over Kairat in the Kazakhstan Super Cup.

=== Ludogorets Razgrad ===
On 17 June 2021, Bulgarian First League club Ludogorets Razgrad announced the signing of Rotariu. He scored his first and only goal for the team on 31 July, in a 3–0 league defeat of CSKA 1948.

==== Loan to Atromitos ====
On 25 January 2022, Rotariu joined Greek side Atromitos on a short-term loan. On 4 July that year, his loan was extended until the summer of 2023. Rotariu scored his first goal in the Super League Greece on 4 September, in a 1–1 home draw with Panathinaikos.

=== FCSB ===
On 10 October 2023, Rotariu returned to Romania on a one-year contract with the option of another two years at FCSB, the cross-town rival of his former team Dinamo București.

== International career ==
Rotariu was called up by manager Christoph Daum to the Romania national team squad to face Montenegro in September 2016. He earned his first cap on 8 October that year, in a 5–0 2018 FIFA World Cup qualifier win over Armenia, in which he came on for Alexandru Chipciu in the 67th minute.

Rotariu scored his first goal for the full side on 27 March 2018, coming on as a 53rd-minute substitute for Alexandru Mitriță and netting the only goal in a friendly against Sweden.

== Style of play ==
Rotariu's main position is that of a winger, preferably on the right flank, but he can also be deployed as a supporting or a lone striker. Cristian Dulca, his coach at the Romania under-21 national team, stated that his best quality is ball control, and that he advances well while looking for spaces between lines.

== Personal life ==
Rotariu's father Ilie was a footballer who totalled two games in the Romanian top tier, and has an identical twin named Iosif. The latter also played for Politehnica Timișoara and the Romania national team, among others.

== Career statistics ==
=== Club ===
As of match played 17 May 2026.

Appearances and goals by club, season and competition
Club	Season	League			National cup (Note: Includes Cupa României, Belgian Cup, KNVB Cup, Kazakhstan Cup, Bulgarian Cup, Greek Cup, Turkish Cup)		League cup (Note: Includes Cupa Ligii)		Continental		Other		Total	
Club	Season	Division	Apps	Goals	Apps	Goals	Apps	Goals	Apps	Goals	Apps	Goals	Apps	Goals
Dinamo II București (loan)	2012–13	Liga II	5	2	—		—		—		—		5	2
Dinamo București (loan)	2012–13	Liga I	7	0	—		—		—		—		7	0
Dinamo București	2013–14	Liga I	31	7	4	2	—		—		—		35	9
Dinamo București	2014–15	Liga I	31	1	2	3	2	0	—		—		35	4
Dinamo București	2015–16	Liga I	32	8	5	1	3	1	—		—		40	10
Dinamo București	2016–17	Liga I	21	6	2	0	2	1	—		—		25	7
Dinamo București	Total		122	22	13	6	7	2	—		—		142	30
Club Brugge	2016–17	Belgian First Division A	12	1	—		—		—		—		12	1
Mouscron (loan)	2017–18	Belgian First Division A	28	9	2	2	—		—		—		30	11
Alkmaar (loan)	2018–19	Eredivisie	8	0	1	1	—		1 (Note: Appearance(s) in UEFA Europa League)	0	—		10	1
Astana	2019	Kazakhstan Premier League	31	7	1	0	—		14 (Note: Two appearances in UEFA Champions League, twelve appearances and one goal in UEFA Europa League)	1	1 (Note: Appearance in Kazakhstan Super Cup)	0	47	8
Astana	2020	Kazakhstan Premier League	12	1	0	0	—		2 (Note: One appearance in UEFA Champions League, one appearance in UEFA Europa League)	1	1	0	15	2
Astana	2021	Kazakhstan Premier League	1	0	—		—		—		0	0	1	0
Astana	Total		44	8	1	0	—		16	2	2	0	63	10
Ludogorets Razgrad	2021–22	Bulgarian First League	6	1	1	0	—		3 (Note: One appearance in UEFA Champions League, two appearances in UEFA Europa League)	0	0	0	10	1
Atromitos (loan)	2021–22	Super League Greece	12	0	—		—		—		—		12	0
Atromitos (loan)	2022–23	Super League Greece	27	4	3	0	—		—		—		30	4
Atromitos (loan)	Total		39	4	3	0	—		—		—		42	4
FCSB	2023–24	Liga I	5	0	2	0	—		—		—		7	0
Ankaragücü	2024–25	TFF 1. Lig	30	6	5	1	—		—		—		35	7
Iğdır	2025–26	TFF 1. Lig	17	0	5	3	—		—		—		22	3
Eyüpspor	2025–26	Süper Lig	4	0	1	0	—		—		—		5	0
Career total			320	54	33	13	7	2	20	2	2	0	383	70

=== International ===
As of match played 10 June 2019.

Appearances and goals by national team and year
National team	Year	Apps	Goals
Romania
Romania	2016	2	0
Romania	2017	2	0
Romania	2018	5	1
Romania	2019	1	0
Total		10	1

Scores and results list Romania's goal tally first, score column indicates score after each Rotariu goal.

List of international goals scored by Dorin Rotariu
No.	Date	Venue	Cap	Opponent	Score	Result	Competition
1	27 March 2018	Stadionul Ion Oblemenco, Craiova, Romania	5	Sweden	1–0	1–0	Friendly

== Honours ==
Dinamo București

- Cupa României runner-up: 2015–16

Astana

- Kazakhstan Premier League: 2019
- Kazakhstan Super Cup: 2019, 2020; runner-up: 2021

Ludogorets Razgrad

- Bulgarian First League: 2021–22
- Bulgarian Supercup: 2021

FCSB

- Liga I: 2023–24

Individual

- Digi Sport Liga I Player of the Month: August 2016
