= Vladimir Zelenovskiy =

Russian footballer and coach

Personal information
- Full name: Vladimir Viktorovich Zelenovskiy
- Date of birth: 20 June 1983 (age 43)
- Place of birth: Brezhnev, Russian SFSR
- Height: 1.78 m (5 ft 10 in)
- Position: Midfielder

Team information
- Current team: FC Arsenal Tula (conditioning coach)

Senior career*
Years	Team	Apps	(Gls)
1999–2000	FC Rotor-2 Volgograd	19	(4)
2000–2004	FC Rotor Volgograd	23	(1)
2005	FC Lada Togliatti	9	(0)
2006–2007	FC Nosta Novotroitsk	50	(7)
2008	FC Mordovia Saransk	26	(3)
2009	FC Tekstilshchik Ivanovo	31	(3)
2010	FC Tyumen	11	(1)
2011	FC Dynamo Kostroma	24	(6)

International career
2004	Russia U-21	3	(0)

Managerial career
- 2017–2019: FC Lokomotiv-Kazanka Moscow (conditioning)
- 2019–2020: FC Spartak-2 Moscow (conditioning)
- 2020: FC Aktobe (assistant)
- 2020: FC Aktobe (caretaker)
- 2021: FC Aktobe (caretaker)
- 2021–2025: PFC Krylia Sovetov Samara (conditioning)
- 2025–: FC Arsenal Tula (conditioning)
- * Club domestic league appearances and goals

Vladimir Viktorovich Zelenovskiy (Russian: Владимир Викторович Зеленовский; born 20 June 1983) is a Russian professional football coach and a former player. He is a conditioning coach for FC Arsenal Tula.

== Club career ==
He made his debut in the Russian Premier League in 2000 for FC Rotor Volgograd.
