= Vladimir Mukhanov =

Russian football coach (born 1954)

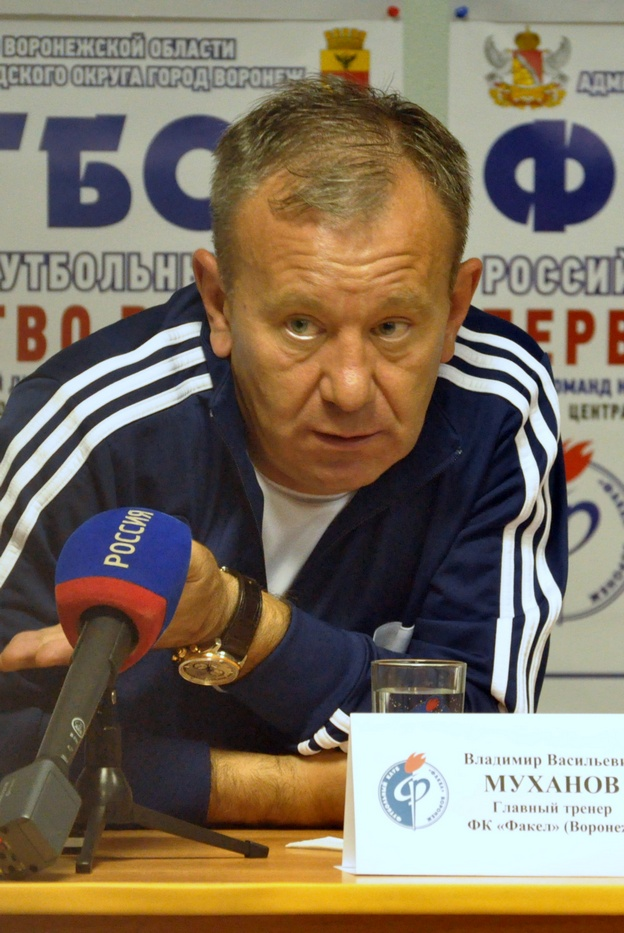
- Vladimir Mukhanov

Personal information
- Full name: Vladimir Vasilyevich Mukhanov
- Date of birth: 20 April 1954 (age 72)
- Place of birth: Ramenskoye, Russian SFSR
- Height: 1.72 m (5 ft 7 1/2 in)
- Position: Forward

Youth career
- SDYuSh Ramenskoye

Senior career*
Years	Team	Apps	(Gls)
1972–1975	CSKA Moscow	7	(1)
1976	SKA Rostov-on-Don	24	(4)
1977	Krylia Sovetov Kuybyshev	0	(0)
1977	SKA Rostov-on-Don	36	(8)
1978–1979	Fakel Voronezh	87	(62)
1980–1984	Lokomotiv Moscow	157	(55)
1987	Sokol Saratov	30	(13)
1988	Fakel Voronezh	40	(9)
1989	Nyva Vinnytsia	29	(3)
1992	Neftekhimik Nizhnekamsk	18	(4)

Managerial career
- 1992: Neftekhimik Nizhnekamsk
- 1995–1997: Leon Saturn Ramenskoye
- 1999: Lada-Simbirsk Dimitrovgrad (assistant)
- 1999: Lada-Simbirsk Dimitrovgrad
- 2000–2001: Fabus Bronnitsy
- 2002: Chernomorets Novorossiysk (assistant)
- 2002: Liepājas Metalurgs
- 2003–2004: Tobol
- 2005: Zhenis
- 2006–2012: Aktobe
- 2013: Fakel Voronezh
- 2013–2014: Khimki
- 2014–2017: Okzhetpes
- 2017–2018: Aktobe
- 2021–2022: Aktobe
- * Club domestic league appearances and goals

Vladimir Vasilyevich Mukhanov (Russian: Владимир Васильевич Муханов; born 20 April 1954) is a Russian football coach and a former player.

== Career ==
He played 37 games in Soviet Top League and scored 6 goals. He started his managerial career in 1992 and managed several Russian First Division teams until 2003, when he came in charge of Kazakhstan Premier League side Tobol. Later he won Kazakhstan Cup with Zhenis in 2005, and the league in 2007 with Aktobe. The year 2008 was the most successful season for him, when his team won all three home trophies: League, Cup and Supercup.

On 17 May 2017, Mukhanov resigned as manager of Okzhetpes. From 2017 till 2018 he managed Aktobe.

== Honours ==
Zhenis Astana

- Kazakhstan Cup (1): 2005

Aktobe

- Kazakhstan Premier League (3): 2007, 2008, 2009
- Kazakhstan Cup (1): 2008
- Kazakhstan Super Cup (2): 2008, 2010
