= FC Aktobe =

Association football club in Kazakhstan

Aktobe
- Full name: Football Club Aktobe; Ақтөбе футбол клубы
- Nicknames: Red and Whites
- Founded: 1967; 59 years ago as Aktyubinets
- Ground: Central Stadium
- Capacity: 13,200
- Owner: Akimat of Aktobe Region
- President: Askar Zhyrgalbekov
- Manager: Nikolay Kostov
- League: Kazakhstan Premier League
- 2025: 5th of 13
- Website: fc-aktobe.kz
Home colours	Away colours

FC Aktobe (Kazakh: Ақтөбе футбол клубы), commonly referred to as FC Aktobe or simply Aktobe, is a professional football club based in Aktobe. They last played in the Kazakhstan Premier League, the highest level of Kazakh football. Formed as Aktyubinets in 1967, they became Aktobemunai in 1996, Aktobe in 1997, Aktobe-Lento in 2000 and finally Aktobe again in 2005. Their home ground is the 13,500 seat Central Stadium.

Aktobe have won five league titles, two Kazakhstan Cups and three Kazakhstan Super Cups. The club has also won two Soviet Second League titles in 1981 and 1991.

== History ==
Aktobe was founded in 1967 as Aktyubinets. They played their first three seasons in the Class B Division, fourth tier of the Soviet League system. For the next 7 seasons, they were not active in official tournaments. In 1976, the club joined the Soviet Second League, to play in its Zone 7, and in 1981, they won the championship . In 1990, the team recorded a 10–0 victory over Bulat, which remains the club's biggest victory on record. In the 1991 season, the last year of Soviet League existence, the club won Zone 8 Championship.

Following the dissolution of the Soviet Union, the club joined the newly formed Kazakhstan Premier League. In 1994, Aktyubinets reached Kazakhstan Cup final, which they lost to Vostok with a score of 0–1. In 1996, the club changed name to Aktobemunai. However, after one season they renamed again to Aktobe. As the result of reduction of league teams in 1997, Aktobe was relegated to the Kazakhstan First Division. In the 2000 season, the club won Kazakhstan First Division and were promoted to the Kazakhstan Premier League.

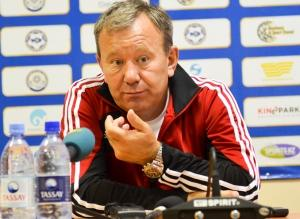
Vladimir Mukhanov managed the team between 2006 and 2012.

On 20 July 2015, Ioan Andone was appointed as the club's manager. After finishing Third in the league, on 10 November 2015, Andone left the club after his contract wasn't extended. On 22 December 2015, Yuri Utkulbayev was announced as Aktobe new manager. Ihor Rakhayev replaced Utkulbayev prior to the start of the 2017 season.

=== Names ===
- 1967 : Aktyubinets
- 1996 : Aktobemunay
- 1997 : Aktobe
- 2000 : Aktobe-Lento
- 2005 : Aktobe

=== Domestic history ===
Season	League									Kazakhstan Cup	Top goalscorer		Managers
Season	Div.	Pos.	Pl.	W	D	L	GS	GA	P	Kazakhstan Cup	Name	League	Managers
1992	1st	12	34	9	13	12	29	36	40	Round 2			(Kazakhstan) V.Baburin
1993	1st	9	46	16	13	17	60	55	61	Round 1	(Kazakhstan) Miroshnichenko	20	(Kazakhstan) V.Baburin (Kazakhstan) N.Akchurin
1994	1st	4	30	15	10	5	45	23	55	Runners-up	(Kazakhstan) Miroshnichenko	19	(Kazakhstan) N.Akchurin (Kazakhstan) Nikitenko
1995	1st	14	30	9	5	16	26	45	32	Round 2			(Kazakhstan) Lemenchuk
1996	1st	10	34	13	6	15	42	48	45	Round 2	(Kazakhstan) Korolev	17	(Kazakhstan) Lemenchuk
1997	1st	11	26	4	3	19	16	56	15	Round 2			(Kazakhstan) Lemenchuk (Kazakhstan) Pobirsky
2001	1st	8	32	13	6	13	33	40	45	Round 1			(Kazakhstan) Pobirsky (Kazakhstan) Linchevskiy
2002	1st	5	32	13	7	12	37	40	46	Quarter-finals	(Kazakhstan) Yurist	9	(Kazakhstan) Linchevskiy (Kazakhstan) Masudov
2003	1st	5	32	13	12	7	40	29	51	Quarter-finals			(Kazakhstan) Masudov (Kazakhstan) Miroshnichenko (Ukraine) Ishchenko
2004	1st	4	36	22	8	6	52	19	74	Quarter-finals			(Ukraine) Ishchenko
2005	1st	1	30	22	4	4	50	27	70	Round 2	(Kazakhstan) Ashirbekov	15	(Kazakhstan) Ramazanov
2006	1st	2	30	18	6	6	48	21	60	Quarter-finals	(Moldova) Rogaciov	16	(Russia) Mukhanov
2007	1st	1	30	22	6	2	55	12	72	Quarter-finals	(Moldova) Rogaciov	16	(Russia) Mukhanov
2008	1st	1	30	20	7	3	61	18	67	Winners	(Kazakhstan) Khairullin	11	(Russia) Mukhanov
2009	1st	1	26	21	2	3	65	19	65	Semi-finals	(Kazakhstan) Tleshev	18	(Russia) Mukhanov
2010	1st	2	32	19	6	7	56	30	63	Quarter-finals	(Kazakhstan) Tleshev	10	(Russia) Mukhanov
2011	1st	3	32	15	9	8	53	31	54	Round 2	(Senegal) Mané	12	(Russia) Mukhanov
2012	1st	3	32	15	5	6	44	22	50	Semi-finals	(Kazakhstan) Khairullin (Uzbekistan) Geynrikh	6	(Russia) Mukhanov (Kazakhstan) Nikitenko
2013	1st	1	32	20	6	6	46	22	66	Semi-finals	(Kazakhstan) Khairullin	7	(Kazakhstan) Nikitenko
2014	1st	2	32	17	10	5	52	31	40	Runners-up	(Kazakhstan) Khairullin	9	(Kazakhstan) Nikitenko (Russia) Gazzayev
2015	1st	3	32	15	9	8	35	25	32	Semi-finals	(Kazakhstan) Khizhnichenko	9	(Russia) Gazzayev (Romania) Andone
2016	1st	6	32	9	9	14	37	52	36	Last 16	(Russia) Bocharov	7	(Russia) Utkulbayev
2017	1st	9	33	8	9	16	38	46	33	Quarter-final	(Belarus) Zyankovich	9	(Ukraine) Rakhayev (Russia) Mukhanov
2018	1st	7	33	13	9	11	51	47	42	Last 16	(Armenia) Pizzelli	18	(Russia) Mukhanov
2019	1st	11	33	7	6	20	35	75	15	Last 16	(Kazakhstan) Aimbetov	16	(Belarus) Sednyov
2020	2nd	1	12	9	2	1	23	4	29	-			
2021	1st	7	26	9	6	11	35	40	33	Group Stage	(Uzbekistan) Sergeyev	7	(Belarus) Baha (Russia) Zelenovskiy (Caretaker) (Kazakhstan) Masudov (Kazakhstan) Mukhtar Erimbetov (Caretaker) (Russia) Mukhanov
2022	1st	2	26	16	4	6	43	28	52	Group Stage	(France) Vidémont	8	(Russia) Mukhanov (Ukraine) Badlo (Caretaker) (Kazakhstan) Karpovich
2023	1st	3	26	13	11	2	44	23	50	Round of 16	(Kazakhstan) Kenesov	6	(Kazakhstan) Karpovich
2024	1st	3	24	12	7	5	39	26	43	Winners	(Russia) Idris Umayev	6	(Ukraine) Parfyonov (Ukraine) Leonov
2025	1st	5	26	13	4	9	39	29	43	Round of 16	(Haiti) Jayro Jean	9	(Ukraine) Leonov (Belarus) Levchuk (Bulgaria) Kostov

=== European history ===
As of match played 11 July 2024

Competition	Pld	W	D	L	GF	GA
UEFA Champions League	16	7	4	5	22	18
UEFA Cup/UEFA Europa League	30	8	7	15	31	46
UEFA Conference League	5	1	1	3	6	6
Total	51	16	12	23	59	70

Season	Competition	Round	Opponent	Home	Away	Aggregate
2006–07	UEFA Champions League	1Q	(Latvia) Liepājas Metalurgs	1–1	0–1	1–2
2007–08	UEFA Cup	1Q	(Austria) SV Mattersburg	1–0	2–4	3–4
2008–09	UEFA Champions League	1Q	(Moldova) Sheriff Tiraspol	1–0	0–4	1–4
2009–10	UEFA Champions League	2Q	(Iceland) FH	2–0	4–0	6–0
2009–10	UEFA Champions League	3Q	(Israel) Maccabi Haifa	0–0	3–4	3–4
2009–10	UEFA Europa League	PO	(Germany) Werder Bremen	0–2	3–6	3–8
2010–11	UEFA Champions League	2Q	(Georgia (country)) Olimpi Rustavi	2–0	1–1	3–1
2010–11	UEFA Champions League	3Q	(Israel) Hapoel Tel Aviv	1–0	1–3	2–3
2010–11	UEFA Europa League	PO	(Netherlands) AZ	2–1	0–2	2–3
2011–12	UEFA Europa League	2Q	(Hungary) Kecskeméti	0–0	1–1	1–1(a)
2011–12	UEFA Europa League	3Q	(Russia) Alania Vladikavkaz	1–1	1–1	2–2(p)
2012–13	UEFA Europa League	1Q	(Georgia (country)) Torpedo Kutaisi	1–0	1–1	2–1
2012–13	UEFA Europa League	2Q	(Moldova) Milsami Orhei	3–0	2–4	5–4
2012–13	UEFA Europa League	3Q	(Belgium) Genk	1–2	1–2	2–4
2013–14	UEFA Europa League	1Q	(Armenia) Gandzasar	2–1	2–1	4–2
2013–14	UEFA Europa League	2Q	(Norway) Hødd	2–0	0–1	2–1
2013–14	UEFA Europa League	3Q	(Iceland) Breiðablik	1–0	0–1	1–1(p)
2013–14	UEFA Europa League	PO	(Ukraine) Dynamo Kyiv	2–3	1–5	3–8
2014–15	UEFA Champions League	2Q	(Georgia (country)) Dinamo Tbilisi	3–0	1–0	4–0
2014–15	UEFA Champions League	3Q	(Romania) Steaua București	2–2	1–2	3–4
2014–15	UEFA Europa League	PO	(Poland) Legia Warsaw	0–1	0–2	0–3
2015–16	UEFA Europa League	1Q	(Estonia) Nõmme Kalju	0–1	0–0	0–1
2016–17	UEFA Europa League	1Q	(Hungary) MTK Budapest	1–1	0–2	1–3
2023–24	UEFA Europa Conference League	2Q	(Georgia (country)) Torpedo Kutaisi	1–2	4–1	5–3
2023–24	UEFA Europa Conference League	3Q	(Romania) Sepsi OSK	0–1	1–1	1–2
2024–25	UEFA Conference League	1Q	(Bosnia and Herzegovina) Sarajevo	0–1	3–2	3–3 (p)
2025–26	UEFA Europa League	1Q	(Poland) Legia Warsaw	0–1	0–1	0–2
2025–26	UEFA Conference League	2Q	(Czech Republic) Sparta Prague	2–1	0–4	2–5

Notes

- 1Q: First qualifying round
- 2Q: Second qualifying round
- 3Q: Third qualifying round
- PO: Play-off round
- GS: Group stage

The following list ranks the current position of Aktobe in UEFA club ranking:

Rank	Team	Points
274	(Kazakhstan) Irtysh Pavlodar	3.625
275	(Kazakhstan) Ordabasy	3.625
276	(Kazakhstan) Aktobe	3.625
277	(Kazakhstan) Shakhter Karagandy	3.625
278	(North Macedonia) Shkëndija	3.500

As of 1 June 2018.

== Colours and crest ==
In March 2016, Aktobe announced Lotto as their new kit suppliers.

== Honours ==
- Kazakhstan Premier League
  - Champions (5): 2005, 2007, 2008, 2009, 2013
- Kazakhstan Cup
  - Champions: 2008, 2024
- Kazakhstan Super Cup
  - Champions (3): 2008, 2010, 2014

== Current squad ==
As of 13 August 2026

Note: Flags indicate national team as defined under FIFA eligibility rules; some limited exceptions apply. Players may hold more than one non-FIFA nationality.

No.	Pos.	Nation	Player
1	GK	KAZ	Igor Trofimets
4	DF	KAZ	Talgat Kusyapov
5	DF	KAZ	Bagdat Kairov
6	MF	MKD	Jani Atanasov
7	FW	NIG	Daniel Sosah
9	MF	ENG	Sheyi Ojo
11	FW	KAZ	Artur Shushenachev
12	DF	UKR	Dmytro Topalov
13	DF	BEL	Senna Miangue
14	MF	ARG	Pibe
16	GK	KAZ	Aleksandr Zarutsky
17	MF	POR	Nani

No.	Pos.	Nation	Player
18	DF	UKR	Ivan Ordets
19	FW	KAZ	Vitaliy Laturnus
20	MF	KAZ	Georgy Zhukov
21	MF	ESP	Pablo Álvarez
22	MF	KAZ	Yerkebulan Seydakhmet
23	DF	KAZ	Temirlan Erlanov
27	DF	KAZ	Timur Dosmagambetov
29	MF	KAZ	Miram Kikbaev
31	DF	KAZ	Adilkhan Tanzharikov
49	MF	KAZ	Nurdaulet Toregali
77	MF	GEO	Giorgi Zaria
95	FW	KAZ	Abat Aymbetov

=== Out on loan ===
Note: Flags indicate national team as defined under FIFA eligibility rules; some limited exceptions apply. Players may hold more than one non-FIFA nationality.

No.	Pos.	Nation	Player
42	MF	KAZ	Ayan Baydavletov (at Caspiy until 31 December 2026)
80	MF	KAZ	Arman Kenesov (at Turan until 31 December 2026)

No.	Pos.	Nation	Player
—	MF	KAZ	Darkhan Berdibek (at Caspiy until 31 December 2026)

== Managerial history ==
- (Kazakhstan) Vladimir Nikitenko (1 Jan 1994 – 31 Dec 1994)
- (Kazakhstan) Vakhid Masudov (2003)
- (Ukraine) Oleksandr Ishchenko (2003–04)
- (Russia) Vladimir Mukhanov (1 July 2006 – 31 Dec 2012)
- (Kazakhstan) Vladimir Nikitenko (1 Jan 2013 – 8 July 2014)
- (Russia) Vladimir Gazzayev (10 July 2014 – 16 July 2015)
- (Romania) Ioan Andone (20 July 2015 – 10 November 2015)
- (Russia) Yuri Utkulbayev (22 December 2015 – December 2016)
- (Ukraine) Ihor Rakhayev (December 2016 – May 2017)
- (Russia) Vladimir Mukhanov (May 2017 – December 2018)
- (Belarus) Aleksandr Sednyov (January 2019 – December 2019)
- (Russia) Vladimir Maminov (January – February 2020)
- (Russia) Aleksei Petrushin (February – September 2020)
- (Russia) Vladimir Zelenovskiy (October – December 2020)
- (Belarus) Alyaksey Baha (January 2021 – 5 May 2021)
- (Russia) Vladimir Zelenovskiy (Caretaker) (5 May 2021 – 7 June 2021)
- (Kazakhstan) Vakhid Masudov (7 June 2021 – 26 July 2021)
- (Kazakhstan) Mukhtar Erimbetov (Caretaker) (26 July 2021 – 4 August 2021)
- (Russia) Vladimir Mukhanov (4 August 2021 – 28 April 2022)
- (Kazakhstan) Petr Badlo (Caretaker) (28 April 2022 – 6 May 2022)
- (Kazakhstan) Andrei Karpovich (6 May 2022 – present)
