= Vladimir Yezhurov =

Russian footballer and manager

Personal information
- Full name: Vladimir Raimovich Yezhurov
- Date of birth: 24 March 1960 (age 66)

Team information
- Current team: Yenisey Krasnoyarsk (assistant manager)

Senior career*
Years	Team	Apps	(Gls)
1988	Yangiyer	1	(0)
1990	Avtomobilist Proletarsk		

Managerial career
- 1990–1994: Pakhtakor Proletarsk
- 1995–1996: Metallurg Bekabad (assistant)
- 1997–1999: Tajikistan (assistant)
- 1999–2000: Pakhtakor Proletarsk
- 2000–2002: Semurg Angren
- 2002: Khujand
- 2003–2005: Rubin-2 Kazan
- 2008: Rubin Kazan (scout)
- 2009–2013: Rubin Kazan (youth)
- 2011: Neftekhimik Nizhnekamsk
- 2014–2015: Yenisey Krasnoyarsk
- 2016: Belshina Bobruisk
- 2016–2017: Yenisey Krasnoyarsk (assistant)
- 2017–2018: Krylia Sovetov Samara (assistant)
- 2019–2020: Rubin Kazan (U21 assistant)
- 2020–2021: Astana (assistant)
- 2021: Astana (caretaker)
- 2022–2024: Neftchi Fergana (assistant)
- 2024–: Yenisey Krasnoyarsk (assistant)
- * Club domestic league appearances and goals

Vladimir Raimovich Yezhurov (Russian: Владимир Раимович Ежуров; born 24 March 1960) is a Russian football manager and a former player. He also holds Tajikistani citizenship. He is an assistant manager with Yenisey Krasnoyarsk.
