= Aleksey Shpilevsky =

Belarusian footballer and coach

Personal information
- Full name: Aleksey Nikolayeivch Shpilevsky
- Date of birth: 17 February 1988 (age 38)
- Place of birth: Minsk, Belarusian SSR, Soviet Union (now Belarus)
- Position: Defensive midfielder

Senior career*
Years	Team	Apps	(Gls)
2004–2006	VfB Stuttgart II		

International career
2005	Belarus U17		

Managerial career
- 2009–2010: Sonnenhof Großaspach (youth)
- 2010–2013: VfB Stuttgart (youth)
- 2013–2018: RB Leipzig (youth)
- 2018: Dinamo Brest
- 2018–2021: Kairat
- 2021: Erzgebirge Aue
- 2022–2025: Aris Limassol
- 2025–2026: Pari Nizhny Novgorod
- * Club domestic league appearances and goals

Aleksey Shpilevsky (Belarusian: Аляксей Шпілеўскі; Russian: Алексей Шпилевский; born 17 February 1988) is a Belarusian football manager.

== Youth career ==
Shpilevsky is the son of Belarusian football agent Nikolay Shpilevsky. He played as a defensive midfielder for youth teams of VfB Stuttgart and represented Belarus at 2005 UEFA European Under-17 Football Championship. In 2006, he had to end his playing career due to a serious back injury.

== Coaching career ==
After retirement, Shpilevsky started working as a coach for young players in Germany. From 2013 until 2018 he worked as a coach in the RB Leipzig youth system.

In June 2018, Shpilevsky joined Belarusian side Dinamo Brest as a head coach, and left the club in August, after misunderstandings with the club's management.

In November 2018, he was presented as the new head coach of FC Kairat, making him the youngest head coach ever in Kazakhstan.

On 7 June 2021, Shpilevsky left Kairat to become the new head coach of FC Erzgebirge Aue. He was sacked after seven matchdays, after recording three points, on 19 September 2021.

In February 2022, Shpilevsky joined Cypriot club Aris Limassol as their new head coach. He led them to a 4th-place finish in the league, tied for the club's highest ever placement. In the following campaign, he led them to the first league championship in the club's history.

On 16 June 2025, Shpilevsky signed a three-year contract with Pari Nizhny Novgorod of the Russian Premier League. On 27 April 2026, Shpilevsky left Pari by mutual consent, with the club in the relegation zone.

== Managerial statistics ==
As of match played 26 April 2026

Managerial record by team and tenure
Team	Nat	From	To	Record					Ref
Team	Nat	From	To	G	W	D	L	Win %	Ref
Dinamo Brest	(Belarus)	28 June 2018	11 August 2018	8	3	3	2	37.50	
Kairat	(Kazakhstan)	25 November 2018	7 June 2021	78	46	14	18	58.97	
Erzgebirge Aue	(Germany)	7 June 2021	19 September 2021	8	0	3	5	0.00	
Aris Limassol	(Cyprus)	26 February 2022	31 May 2025	139	74	32	33	53.24	
Pari Nizhny Novgorod	(Russia)	16 June 2025	Present	32	7	4	21	21.88	
Total				265	130	56	79	49.06	—

== Honours ==
Kairat

- Kazakhstan Premier League: 2020

Aris Limassol

- Cypriot First Division: 2022–23
- Cypriot Super Cup: 2023
