= List of Kazakhstan football transfers winter 2014 =

This is a list of Kazakh football transfers in the winter transfer window 2014 by club. Only clubs of the 2014 Kazakhstan Premier League are included.

== Kazakhstan Premier League 2014 ==
=== Aktobe ===
In: Note: Flags indicate national team as defined under FIFA eligibility rules; some limited exceptions apply. Players may hold more than one non-FIFA nationality.

No.	Pos.	Nation	Player
6	MF	RUS	Taras Tsarikayev (from (Russia) Alania Vladikavkaz)
8	FW	UKR	Artem Milevskyi (from (Turkey) Gaziantepspor)
9	FW	ARM	Marcos Pizzelli (loan from (Russia) Krasnodar)
11	FW	BRA	Danilo Neco (from (Russia) Alania Vladikavkaz)
18	MF	KAZ	Pavel Shabalin (from (Kazakhstan) Irtysh)
22	DF	KAZ	Valeri Korobkin (from (Kazakhstan) Astana)
40	GK	KAZ	Almat Bekbaev (from (Kazakhstan) Tobol)
78	FW	BLR	Ihar Zyankovich (from (Kazakhstan) Shakhter Karagandy)

Out: Note: Flags indicate national team as defined under FIFA eligibility rules; some limited exceptions apply. Players may hold more than one non-FIFA nationality.

No.	Pos.	Nation	Player
8	FW	RUS	Sergei Davydov (loan return to (Russia) Rubin Kazan)
8	FW	UKR	Artem Milevskyi
14	FW	KAZ	Sergey Gridin (to (Kazakhstan) Atyrau)
19	FW	KAZ	Sergei Lisenkov (to (Kazakhstan) Akzhayik)
22	DF	KAZ	Sanat Shalekenov (to (Kazakhstan) Akzhayik)
39	MF	MDA	Serghei Covalciuc (retired)
89	DF	KAZ	Aldan Baltaev (to (Kazakhstan) Kaisar)

=== Astana ===
In: Note: Flags indicate national team as defined under FIFA eligibility rules; some limited exceptions apply. Players may hold more than one non-FIFA nationality.

No.	Pos.	Nation	Player
5	DF	BIH	Marin Aničić (from (Bosnia and Herzegovina) Zrinjski Mostar)
19	MF	KAZ	Georgiy Zhukov (loan from (Belgium) Standard Liège)
20	MF	BLR	Renan Bressan (from (Kazakhstan) FC Aktobe)
22	FW	KAZ	Bauyrzhan Dzholchiev (from (Kazakhstan) Tobol)
33	FW	KAZ	Vitali Lee (from (Kazakhstan) Kairat)
44	DF	RUS	Yevgeny Postnikov (from (Belarus) Shakhtyor Soligorsk)
77	DF	KAZ	Dmitri Shomko (from (Kazakhstan) Irtysh)
76	FW	BUL	Atanas Kurdov (from (Bulgaria) Slavia Sofia)
88	MF	COL	Roger Cañas (from (Kazakhstan) Shakhter Karagandy)

Out: Note: Flags indicate national team as defined under FIFA eligibility rules; some limited exceptions apply. Players may hold more than one non-FIFA nationality.

No.	Pos.	Nation	Player
3	DF	KAZ	Valeri Korobkin (to (Kazakhstan) Aktobe)
5	DF	KAZ	Kirill Pasichnik (to (Kazakhstan) Atyrau)
7	MF	KAZ	Ulan Konysbayev (to (Kazakhstan) Shakhter Karagandy)
11	MF	KAZ	Bauyrzhan Islamkhan (loan return to (Russia) Kuban Krasnodar)
12	FW	GHA	Patrick Twumasi (loan return to (Latvia) Spartaks Jūrmala)
14	DF	MNE	Blažo Igumanović (to (Montenegro) Rudar)
21	DF	KAZ	Alexander Kirov (to (Kazakhstan) Shakhter Karagandy)
26	DF	BRA	Zelão
85	FW	KAZ	Daurenbek Tazhimbetov (loan return to (Kazakhstan) Shakhter Karagandy)

=== Atyrau ===
In: Note: Flags indicate national team as defined under FIFA eligibility rules; some limited exceptions apply. Players may hold more than one non-FIFA nationality.

No.	Pos.	Nation	Player
3	DF	BLR	Pavel Plaskonny (from (Belarus) Dinamo Minsk)
5	DF	KAZ	Kirill Pasichnik (from (Kazakhstan) Astana)
7	MF	CMR	Guy Essame (from (Belarus) Neman Grodno)
14	FW	SRB	Miloš Trifunović (from (China) Liaoning Whowin)
17	FW	KAZ	Sergey Gridin (from (Kazakhstan) Aktobe)
18	MF	BLR	Mikhail Afanasyev (from (Belarus) Gomel)
20	DF	NGA	Michael Odibe (from (Ukraine) Arsenal Kyiv)
21	MF	KAZ	Andrei Karpovich (from (Kazakhstan) Ordabasy)
22	MF	BLR	Filip Rudzik (from (Belarus) BATE Borisov)
27	MF	KAZ	Evgeny Kostrub (from (Kazakhstan) Akzhayik)
28	FW	BLR	Dmitri Parkhachev (from (Belarus) Slavia Mozyr)
30	GK	KAZ	Anton Tsirin (from (Kazakhstan) Zhetysu)
33	DF	RUS	Marat Butuyev (from (Russia) Alania Vladikavkaz)
46	MF	SRB	Marko Blažić (from (Uzbekistan) Bunyodkor)
77	MF	GER	Savio Nsereko (from (Germany) Viktoria Köln)
86	FW	BLR	Aliaksei Kuchuk (from (Portugal) Beira-Mar)

Out: Note: Flags indicate national team as defined under FIFA eligibility rules; some limited exceptions apply. Players may hold more than one non-FIFA nationality.

No.	Pos.	Nation	Player
2	DF	KAZ	Yevgeni Ovshinov (to (Kazakhstan) Spartak Semey)
4	MF	SRB	Jovan Golić (to (Kazakhstan) Taraz)
5	DF	KAZ	Maksim Samchenko (to (Kazakhstan) Spartak Semey)
9	FW	KAZ	Beibut Tatishev (to (Kazakhstan) Zhetysu)
12	MF	KAZ	Denis Rodionov (to (Kazakhstan) Zhetysu)
17	MF	RUS	Artyom Fomin
20	DF	KGZ	Sergey Kutsov (to (Kazakhstan) Spartak Semey)
22	MF	KAZ	Yerlan Turashbayev
24	DF	KAZ	Oleksandr Stakhiv
25	MF	MNE	Miloš Stojčev (to (Bosnia and Herzegovina) Sarajevo)
29	GK	KAZ	Sergey Boychenko (to (Kazakhstan) Spartak Semey)
33	GK	KAZ	Vladimir Plotnikov (to (Kazakhstan) Zhetysu)
41	DF	SRB	Đorđe Tutorić
55	FW	SRB	Nenad Injac (to (Serbia) Rad)
77	DF	KAZ	Vitali Goloveshkin
86	DF	CRO	Robert Alviž (to (Brunei) DPMM)
88	MF	SRB	Nikola Milanković (to (Serbia) Napredak Kruševac)
91	FW	KAZ	Aleksey Shchotkin (to (Kazakhstan) Taraz)

=== Irtysh ===
In: Note: Flags indicate national team as defined under FIFA eligibility rules; some limited exceptions apply. Players may hold more than one non-FIFA nationality.

No.	Pos.	Nation	Player
4	DF	MNE	Miodrag Džudović (from (Russia) Spartak Nalchik)
7	MF	TKM	Arslanmyrat Amanow (from (Turkmenistan) HTTU)
15	DF	CZE	Jakub Chleboun (from (Kazakhstan) Akzhayik)
19	DF	KAZ	Grigori Sartakov (from (Kazakhstan) Spartak Semey)
23	DF	KAZ	Zakhar Korobov (from (Kazakhstan) Zhetysu)
30	FW	UKR	Kostyantyn Dudchenko (from (Russia) Shinnik)
98	MF	MNE	Igor Burzanović (from (Montenegro) Budućnost Podgorica)

Out: Note: Flags indicate national team as defined under FIFA eligibility rules; some limited exceptions apply. Players may hold more than one non-FIFA nationality.

No.	Pos.	Nation	Player
4	MF	BLR	Alyaksandr Kulchy (Retired)
7	MF	KAZ	Pavel Shabalin (to (Kazakhstan) Aktobe)
8	DF	MLI	Mamoutou Coulibaly (to (Kazakhstan) Kaisar)
9	FW	RUS	Sergei Strukov (to (Kazakhstan) Kaisar)
15	DF	KAZ	Dmitri Shomko (to (Kazakhstan) Astana)
16	DF	KAZ	Timur Khalmuratov
22	DF	KAZ	Gafurzhan Suyumbayev (to (Kazakhstan) Ordabasy)
25	DF	CZE	Štěpán Kučera (to (Kazakhstan) Tobol)
87	MF	UZB	Kamoliddin Murzoev (to (Kazakhstan) Shakhter Karagandy)

=== Winter ===
In: Note: Flags indicate national team as defined under FIFA eligibility rules; some limited exceptions apply. Players may hold more than one non-FIFA nationality.

No.	Pos.	Nation	Player
2	DF	RUS	Zaurbek Pliyev (from (Russia) Alania Vladikavkaz)
6	DF	SRB	Žarko Marković (from (Romania) Gaz Metan Mediaș)
9	MF	KAZ	Bauyrzhan Islamkhan (from (Russia) Kuban Krasnodar, previously on loan to (Kazakhstan) Astana)
16	GK	RUS	Dmitri Khomich (from (Russia) Alania Vladikavkaz)
19	MF	RUS	Mikhail Bakayev (from (Russia) Alania Vladikavkaz)
23	FW	CZE	Miloš Lačný (from (Slovakia) MFK Ružomberok)

Out: Note: Flags indicate national team as defined under FIFA eligibility rules; some limited exceptions apply. Players may hold more than one non-FIFA nationality.

No.	Pos.	Nation	Player
2	DF	GHA	Daniel Addo
8	MF	SCO	Stuart Duff
18	MF	FIN	Alexei Eremenko (to (Scotland) Kilmarnock)

=== Kaisar ===
In: Note: Flags indicate national team as defined under FIFA eligibility rules; some limited exceptions apply. Players may hold more than one non-FIFA nationality.

No.	Pos.	Nation	Player
4	DF	MLI	Mamoutou Coulibaly (from (Kazakhstan) Irtysh)
5	DF	KAZ	Damir Dautov (from (Kazakhstan) Zhetysu)
7	MF	EST	Sergei Mošnikov (from (Poland) Górnik Zabrze)
9	FW	RUS	Sergei Strukov (from (Kazakhstan) Irtysh)
10	FW	KGZ	Anton Zemlianukhin (from (Kazakhstan) Kairat)
15	DF	SRB	Miljan Jablan (from (Belarus) Neman Grodno)
22	MF	KAZ	Kirill Shestakov (from (Kazakhstan) Kairat)
25	FW	MKD	Dušan Savić (from (Ukraine) Hoverla Uzhhorod)
28	FW	EST	Rimo Hunt (from (Estonia) Levadia Tallinn)
30	GK	UKR	Yevhen Shyryayev (from (Ukraine) Zirka Kirovohrad)
44	DF	CZE	Martin Klein (from (Czech Republic) Teplice)
90	MF	SVN	Matic Maruško (from (Slovenia) Spartak Trnava)

Out: Note: Flags indicate national team as defined under FIFA eligibility rules; some limited exceptions apply. Players may hold more than one non-FIFA nationality.

No.	Pos.	Nation	Player
3	DF	KAZ	Yegor Azovskiy (to (Kazakhstan) Okzhetpes)
29	DF	SVN	Mitja Mörec (to (Azerbaijan) Ravan Baku)

=== Ordabasy ===
In: Note: Flags indicate national team as defined under FIFA eligibility rules; some limited exceptions apply. Players may hold more than one non-FIFA nationality.

No.	Pos.	Nation	Player
2	DF	BRA	Freire (loan from (Portugal) Nacional)
5	DF	KAZ	Gafurzhan Suyumbayev (from (Kazakhstan) Irtysh Pavlodar)
18	FW	KAZ	Daurenbek Tazhimbetov (from (Kazakhstan) Shakhter Karagandy)
25	MF	SEN	Abdoulaye Diakate (from (Kazakhstan) Taraz)
38	MF	KAZ	Ali Aliyev (from (Kazakhstan) Vostok)
44	DF	SRB	Mladen Lazarević (from (Serbia) Novi Pazar)
89	FW	CZE	Pavel Černý (from (Kazakhstan) Akzhayik)
—	DF	KAZ	Kazbek Geteriev (from (Kazakhstan) Kairat)

Out: Note: Flags indicate national team as defined under FIFA eligibility rules; some limited exceptions apply. Players may hold more than one non-FIFA nationality.

No.	Pos.	Nation	Player
8	MF	KAZ	Andrei Karpovich (to (Kazakhstan) Atyrau)
9	FW	KAZ	Gleb Maltsev
11	FW	SEN	Gueye Mansour (to (Romania) Poli Timișoara)
21	FW	GEO	Davit Chagelishvili (to (Kazakhstan) Kyzylzhar)
85	FW	BRA	Andrezinho (to (Thailand) Phuket)
88	FW	NGA	Baba Collins
99	DF	TUN	Mohamed Larbi Arouri
—	FW	SRB	Danilo Belić (to (Kazakhstan) Akzhayik)

=== Shakhter Karagandy ===
In: Note: Flags indicate national team as defined under FIFA eligibility rules; some limited exceptions apply. Players may hold more than one non-FIFA nationality.

No.	Pos.	Nation	Player
6	DF	POR	Yago (from (Sweden) Häcken)
9	FW	BIH	Mihret Topcagić (from (Austria) Wolfsberger AC)
10	MF	KAZ	Ulan Konysbayev (from (Kazakhstan) Astana)
27	MF	UZB	Kamoliddin Murzoev (from (Kazakhstan) Irtysh Pavlodar)
29	MF	UZB	Shavkat Salomov (from (Kazakhstan) Zhetysu)
84	DF	KAZ	Aleksandr Kirov (from (Kazakhstan) Astana)
—	FW	KAZ	Daurenbek Tazhimbetov (loan return from (Kazakhstan) Astana)

Out: Note: Flags indicate national team as defined under FIFA eligibility rules; some limited exceptions apply. Players may hold more than one non-FIFA nationality.

No.	Pos.	Nation	Player
13	MF	KAZ	Vadim Borovskiy
21	MF	KAZ	Aslan Darabayev (to (Kazakhstan) Kairat)
21	GK	KAZ	Sergey Tkachuk
28	MF	ARM	Gevorg Ghazaryan (loan return to (Ukraine) Metalurh Donetsk)
78	FW	BLR	Ihar Zyankovich (to (Kazakhstan) Aktobe)
88	MF	COL	Roger Cañas (to (Kazakhstan) Astana)
91	FW	KAZ	Sergei Khizhnichenko (to (Poland) Korona Kielce)
—	FW	KAZ	Daurenbek Tazhimbetov (to (Kazakhstan) Ordabasy)

=== Spartak Semey ===
In: Note: Flags indicate national team as defined under FIFA eligibility rules; some limited exceptions apply. Players may hold more than one non-FIFA nationality.

No.	Pos.	Nation	Player
17	DF	KAZ	Yevgeni Ovshinov (from (Kazakhstan) Atyrau)
18	MF	KAZ	Maksim Azovskiy (from (Kazakhstan) Zhetysu)
20	DF	KGZ	Sergey Kutsov (from (Kazakhstan) Atyrau)
29	GK	KAZ	Sergey Boychenko (from (Kazakhstan) Atyrau)
31	MF	SRB	Goran Obradović
52	DF	BUL	Viktor Genev (from (Bulgaria) Slavia Sofia)
71	MF	BUL	Nikolay Dyulgerov (from (Bulgaria) CSKA Sofia)
77	MF	BUL	Daniel Peev (from (Bulgaria) Lokomotiv Sofia)
84	FW	SRB	Nemanja Jovanović (from (Norway) Sandnes Ulf)
—	MF	SRB	Nemanja Čović (from (Serbia) Donji Srem)

Out: Note: Flags indicate national team as defined under FIFA eligibility rules; some limited exceptions apply. Players may hold more than one non-FIFA nationality.

No.	Pos.	Nation	Player

=== Taraz ===
In: Note: Flags indicate national team as defined under FIFA eligibility rules; some limited exceptions apply. Players may hold more than one non-FIFA nationality.

No.	Pos.	Nation	Player
2	DF	SUR	Sigourney Bandjar (from (Netherlands) RKC Waalwijk)
12	FW	KAZ	Aleksey Shchetkin (from (Kazakhstan) Atyrau)
15	DF	SVN	Rok Roj (from (Slovenia) NK Zavrc)
18	MF	SRB	Jovan Golić (from (Kazakhstan) Atyrau)
19	FW	FRA	Richard Barroilhet (from (England) Nuneaton Town)
20	MF	NED	Desley Ubbink (from (Netherlands) RKC Waalwijk)

Out: Note: Flags indicate national team as defined under FIFA eligibility rules; some limited exceptions apply. Players may hold more than one non-FIFA nationality.

No.	Pos.	Nation	Player
4	DF	SRB	Ersin Mehmedović (to (Serbia) Novi Pazar)
15	MF	SEN	Abdoulaye Diakate (to (Kazakhstan) Ordabasy)
18	MF	RUS	Nikolai Nesterenko
19	FW	SRB	Miroslav Lečić
29	FW	NGA	Obiora Odita
50	FW	CMR	Titi Essomba (to (Finland) AC Oulu)

=== Tobol ===
In: Note: Flags indicate national team as defined under FIFA eligibility rules; some limited exceptions apply. Players may hold more than one non-FIFA nationality.

No.	Pos.	Nation	Player
3	DF	KAZ	Vladimir Pokatilov (from (Kazakhstan) Akzhayik)
13	DF	CZE	Ondřej Kušnír (from (Czech Republic) Slovan Liberec)
25	DF	CZE	Štěpán Kučera (from (Kazakhstan) Irtysh)
81	MF	AUT	Tomáš Šimkovič (from Austria Wien)
87	FW	POL	Łukasz Gikiewicz (from (Cyprus) AC Omonia)
99	FW	CZE	Jiří Jeslínek (from (Czech Republic) Mladá Boleslav)

Out: Note: Flags indicate national team as defined under FIFA eligibility rules; some limited exceptions apply. Players may hold more than one non-FIFA nationality.

No.	Pos.	Nation	Player
1	GK	KAZ	Almat Bekbaev (to (Kazakhstan) Aktobe)
4	DF	BRA	Jhonnes
7	FW	MKD	Mensur Kurtiši (to (North Macedonia) Shkëndija)
14	MF	ETH	Yussuf Saleh (to (Sweden) Syrianska)
16	FW	RUS	Aleksandr Alumona (to (Belarus) Belshina Bobruisk)
18	DF	KAZ	Daniyar Mukanov
22	FW	KAZ	Bauyrzhan Dzholchiev (to (Kazakhstan) Astana)

=== Zhetysu ===
In: Note: Flags indicate national team as defined under FIFA eligibility rules; some limited exceptions apply. Players may hold more than one non-FIFA nationality.

No.	Pos.	Nation	Player
4	DF	CIV	Didier Kadio (loan from (Armenia) Shirak)
6	MF	KAZ	Denis Rodionov (from (Kazakhstan) Atyrau)
21	FW	BIH	Mersudin Ahmetović (from (Russia) Salyut Belgorod)
77	MF	SRB	Marko Putinčanin (from (Serbia) Bežanija)
79	FW	CIV	Boti Goa (from (Armenia) Shirak)

Out: Note: Flags indicate national team as defined under FIFA eligibility rules; some limited exceptions apply. Players may hold more than one non-FIFA nationality.

No.	Pos.	Nation	Player
1	GK	KAZ	Anton Tsirin (to (Kazakhstan) Atyrau)
4	DF	BIH	Mehmedalija Čović (to (Bosnia and Herzegovina) Čelik Zenica)
5	DF	KAZ	Damir Dautov (to (Kazakhstan) Kaisar)
6	DF	TJK	Davron Ergashev (to (Azerbaijan) Gabala)
7	MF	KAZ	Serikzhan Muzhikov (to (Kazakhstan) Astana)
8	MF	KAZ	Dmitriy Mamonov
9	MF	UZB	Shavkat Salomov (to (Kazakhstan) Shakhter Karagandy)
13	MF	UZB	Ruslan Melziddinov (to (Uzbekistan) Neftchi)
16	GK	KAZ	Sergei Stepanenko
17	DF	KAZ	Vladimir Yakovlev
18	MF	KAZ	Maksim Azovskiy (to (Kazakhstan) Spartak Semey)
33	FW	SRB	Ivan Perić (to (Turkey) Mersin İdmanyurdu)
