= 2014 FC Atyrau season =

FC Atyrau
2014 season
- Chairman: Zheksenbai Kusainov
- Manager: Anatoliy Yurevich & Vladimir Belyavskiy (until July 2014); Vladimir Nikitenko (from July 2014)
- Stadium: Munaishy Stadium
- Kazakhstan Premier League: 9th
- Kazakhstan Cup: Quarter-final vs Kairat
- Top goalscorer: League: (13); Miloš Trifunović; All: (15); Miloš Trifunović
Home colours	Away colours

The 2014 FC Atyrau season was the 14th successive season that the club playing in the Kazakhstan Premier League, the highest tier of association football in Kazakhstan. Atyrau finished the season in 9th position and reached the Quarter-finals of the Kazakhstan Cup, where they lost to Kairat.

== Squad ==
As of 19 September 2014. Note: Flags indicate national team as defined under FIFA eligibility rules; some limited exceptions apply. Players may hold more than one non-FIFA nationality.

No.	Pos.	Nation	Player
1	GK	KAZ	Andrey Shabanov
3	DF	BLR	Pavel Plaskonny
6	MF	KAZ	Aleksey Shakin
8	DF	KAZ	Valentin Chureyev
10	MF	GEO	George Peikrishvili
13	MF	KAZ	Aibar Nurybekov
14	FW	SRB	Miloš Trifunović
18	DF	BLR	Mikhail Afanasyev
20	DF	NGR	Michael Odibe
21	MF	KAZ	Andrei Karpovich
23	DF	KAZ	Rinat Abdulin

No.	Pos.	Nation	Player
27	MF	KAZ	Evgeny Kostrub
28	MF	BLR	Dmitri Parkhachev
30	GK	KAZ	Anton Tsirin
32	MF	KAZ	Marat Shakhmetov (loan from Astana)
33	DF	RUS	Marat Butuyev
40	FW	GHA	Dominic Adiyiah
46	MF	SRB	Marko Blažić
50	MF	KAZ	Bekzhan Onzhan
90	GK	KAZ	Nurbolat Kalmenov
91	DF	KAZ	Azamat Izbasarov

=== Out on loan ===
Note: Flags indicate national team as defined under FIFA eligibility rules; some limited exceptions apply. Players may hold more than one non-FIFA nationality.

No.	Pos.	Nation	Player
7	MF	CMR	Guy Essame (at Astana)

== Transfers ==
=== Winter ===
In: Note: Flags indicate national team as defined under FIFA eligibility rules; some limited exceptions apply. Players may hold more than one non-FIFA nationality.

No.	Pos.	Nation	Player
3	DF	BLR	Pavel Plaskonny (from (Belarus) Dinamo Minsk)
5	DF	KAZ	Kirill Pasichnik (from (Kazakhstan) Astana)
7	MF	CMR	Guy Essame (from (Belarus) Neman Grodno)
14	FW	SRB	Miloš Trifunović (from (China) Liaoning Whowin)
17	FW	KAZ	Sergey Gridin (from (Kazakhstan) Aktobe)
18	MF	BLR	Mikhail Afanasyev (from (Belarus) Gomel)
20	DF	NGR	Michael Odibe (from (Ukraine) Arsenal Kyiv)
21	MF	KAZ	Andrei Karpovich (from (Kazakhstan) Ordabasy)
22	MF	BLR	Filip Rudzik (from (Belarus) BATE Borisov)
27	MF	KAZ	Evgeny Kostrub (from (Kazakhstan) Akzhayik)
28	FW	BLR	Dmitri Parkhachev (from (Belarus) Slavia Mozyr)
30	GK	KAZ	Anton Tsirin (from (Kazakhstan) Zhetysu)
33	DF	RUS	Marat Butuyev (from (Russia) Alania Vladikavkaz)
46	MF	SRB	Marko Blažić (from (Uzbekistan) Bunyodkor)
77	MF	GER	Savio Nsereko (from (Germany) Viktoria Köln)
86	FW	BLR	Aliaksei Kuchuk (from (Portugal) Beira-Mar)

Out: Note: Flags indicate national team as defined under FIFA eligibility rules; some limited exceptions apply. Players may hold more than one non-FIFA nationality.

No.	Pos.	Nation	Player
2	DF	KAZ	Yevgeni Ovshinov (to (Kazakhstan) Spartak Semey)
4	MF	SRB	Jovan Golić (to (Kazakhstan) Taraz)
5	DF	KAZ	Maksim Samchenko (to (Kazakhstan) Spartak Semey)
9	FW	KAZ	Beibut Tatishev (to (Kazakhstan) Zhetysu)
12	MF	KAZ	Denis Rodionov (to (Kazakhstan) Zhetysu)
17	MF	RUS	Artyom Fomin
20	DF	KGZ	Sergey Kutsov (to (Kazakhstan) Spartak Semey)
22	MF	KAZ	Yerlan Turashbayev
24	DF	KAZ	Oleksandr Stakhiv
25	MF	MNE	Miloš Stojčev (to (Bosnia and Herzegovina) Sarajevo)
29	GK	KAZ	Sergey Boychenko (to (Kazakhstan) Spartak Semey)
33	GK	KAZ	Vladimir Plotnikov (to (Kazakhstan) Zhetysu)
41	DF	SRB	Đorđe Tutorić
55	FW	SRB	Nenad Injac (to (Serbia) Rad)
77	DF	KAZ	Vitali Goloveshkin
86	DF	CRO	Robert Alviž (to (Brunei) DPMM)
88	MF	SRB	Nikola Milanković (to (Serbia) Napredak Kruševac)
91	FW	KAZ	Aleksey Shchotkin (to (Kazakhstan) Taraz)

=== Summer ===
In: Note: Flags indicate national team as defined under FIFA eligibility rules; some limited exceptions apply. Players may hold more than one non-FIFA nationality.

No.	Pos.	Nation	Player
32	MF	KAZ	Marat Shakhmetov (loan from (Kazakhstan) Astana)
40	FW	GHA	Dominic Adiyiah

Out: Note: Flags indicate national team as defined under FIFA eligibility rules; some limited exceptions apply. Players may hold more than one non-FIFA nationality.

No.	Pos.	Nation	Player
5	DF	KAZ	Kirill Pasichnik
7	MF	CMR	Guy Essame (loan to (Kazakhstan) Astana)
9	FW	KAZ	Aleksey Schetkin
17	FW	KAZ	Sergey Gridin (to (Kazakhstan) Ordabasy)
22	MF	BLR	Filip Rudzik (to (Kazakhstan) Spartak Semey)
77	MF	GER	Savio Nsereko
86	FW	BLR	Aliaksei Kuchuk

== Competitions ==
=== Kazakhstan Premier League ===
==== First round ====
===== Results summary =====
Overall								Home						Away					
Pld	W	D	L	GF	GA	GD	Pts	W	D	L	GF	GA	GD	W	D	L	GF	GA	GD
22	6	6	10	19	27	−8	24	4	3	4	12	13	−1	2	3	6	7	14	−7

Last updated: 20 November 2014.
Source: Soccerway

===== Results by round =====
Round	1	2	3	4	5	6	7	8	9	10	11	12	13	14	15	16	17	18	19	20	21	22
Ground																						
Result																						
Position																						

Source: Soccerway
A = Away; H = Home; W = Win; D = Draw; L = Loss

===== Results =====
15 March 2014 1	Kairat	0 – 1	Atyrau	Almaty
18:00 (UTC+6)	Marković (yellow card) 5'; Pliyev (yellow card) 59'	Summary	Karpovich (yellow card) 29'; Savio 31' (yellow card) 41'; E.Kostrub (yellow card) 50'; Afanasyev (yellow card) 83'	Stadium: Central Stadium; Attendance: 8,000; Referee: Denis Izmailov

22 March 2014 2	Atyrau	0 – 0	Tobol	Atyrau
16:00 (UTC+6)	Savio (yellow card) 59'	Summary	A.Malyshev (yellow card) 56'; Zhumaskaliyev (yellow card) 59'	Stadium: Munaishy Stadium; Attendance: 3,800; Referee: Aleksandr Gauzer

29 March 2014 3	Irtysh	0 – 1	Atyrau	Pavlodar
14:00 (UTC+6)	Mukhutdinov (yellow card) 20'; Govedarica (yellow card) 55'; Bakayev (yellow card) 88'	Summary	Trifunović 12'; Rudzik (yellow card) 72'; E.Kostrub (yellow card) 82'	Stadium: Central Stadium; Attendance: 4,500; Referee: Igor Chesnokov

5 April 2014 4	Atyrau	0 – 0	Aktobe	Atyrau
15:00 (UTC+6)	Karpovich (yellow card) 38'; Abdulin (yellow card) 90'	Summary	Logvinenko (yellow card) 48'; Korobkin (yellow card) 63' (red card) 64'; P.Badlo (yellow card) 82'	Stadium: Munaishy Stadium; Attendance: 3,500; Referee: Aydin Rakhimbayev

9 April 2014 5	Shakhter Karagandy	2 – 0	Atyrau	Karaganda
16:00 (UTC+6)	Konysbayev (yellow card) 51'; Finonchenko (yellow card) 54'; Odibe 57' (o.g.); Baizhanov (yellow card) 64'; Paryvaew (yellow card) 72' (goal) 90'; Simčević (yellow card) 85'	Summary	Essame (yellow card) 65'	Stadium: Shakhter Stadium; Attendance: 3,000; Referee: Akmalkhan Kholmatov

13 April 2014 6	Atyrau	2 – 1	Spartak Semey	Atyrau
16:00 (UTC+6)	Rudzik 8' (pen.); Savio (yellow card) 40'; Karpovich (yellow card) 61'; Essame (yellow card) 79'; Gridin 87'	Summary	S.Sagindikov (yellow card) 15'; Čović 61'; Dyulgerov (yellow card) 80'	Stadium: Munaishy Stadium; Attendance: 6,500; Referee: Bolat Karlibayev

19 April 2014 7	Taraz	3 – 3	Atyrau	Taraz
16:00 (UTC+6)	Dosmagambetov 56'; Tleshev 69' (yellow card) 90+2'; Sergienko (yellow card) 70'; Roj (yellow card) 75'; Golić 90' (yellow card) 90+2' (yellow-red card) 90+3'	Summary	Essame 30', 88'; Butuyev (yellow card) 33'; Parkhachev (yellow card) 55'; Trifunović 59'; Odibe (yellow card) 90+2'; Karpovich (yellow card) 90+4'	Stadium: Central Stadium; Attendance: 4,100; Referee: Artyom Kuchin

27 April 2014 8	Zhetysu	1 – 0	Atyrau	Taldykorgan
17:00 (UTC+6)	A.Totay (yellow card) 29'; Kovalev 33' (yellow card) 33' (yellow-red card) 71'; Rodionov (yellow card) 41'; R.Esatov (yellow card) 55'; Putinčanin (yellow card) 85'; V.Plotnikov (yellow card) 90+5'	Summary	Odibe (yellow card) 10'; Rudzik (yellow card) 41'; Savio (yellow card) 61'; A.Shakin (yellow card) 83'	Stadium: Zhetysu Stadium; Attendance: 3,000; Referee: Viktor Antonov

1 May 2014 9	Atyrau	1 – 1	Ordabasy	Atyrau
17:00 (UTC+6)	E.Kostrub (yellow card) 24'; Trifunović 25'	Summary	Kasyanov 15'; Y.Levin (yellow card) 30'; Aliev (yellow card) 58'	Stadium: Munaishy Stadium; Attendance: 3,000; Referee: Denis Tevyashov

6 May 2014 10	Kaisar	2 – 1	Atyrau	Kyzylorda
18:00 (UTC+6)	Klein (yellow card) 45'; Hunt 57', 78'	Summary	Parkhachev 13'; K.Pasichnik (yellow card) 45+1'	Stadium: Gany Muratbayev Stadium; Attendance: 5,500; Referee: Marat Iskakov

10 May 2014 11	Atyrau	1 – 0	Astana	Atyrau
17:00 (UTC+6)	Odibe (red card) 2'; Trifunović 30' (pen.); Blažić (yellow card) 61'; A.Shabanov (yellow card) 88'	Summary		Stadium: Munaishy Stadium; Attendance: 3,000; Referee: Akmalkhan Kholmatov

18 May 2014 12	Tobol	0 – 0	Atyrau	Kostanay
17:00 (UTC+6)		Summary	Karpovich (yellow card) 72'	Stadium: Central Stadium; Attendance: 2,000; Referee: Igor Khisamutdinov

24 May 2014 13	Atyrau	0 – 1	Irtysh	Atyrau
19:00 (UTC+6)		Summary	Chuchman (yellow card) 11'; Dudchenko 35'; A.Ayaganov (yellow card) 49'; Bakayev (yellow card) 64'; Chernyshov (yellow card) 86'; Amanow (yellow card) 87'	Stadium: Munaishy Stadium; Attendance: 2,500; Referee: Artyom Kuchin

28 May 2014 14	Aktobe	0 – 0	Atyrau	Aktobe
21:00 (UTC+6)	Danilo Neco (yellow card) 52'; Khairullin (yellow card) 85'	Summary	Karpovich (yellow card) 31'; Parkhachev (yellow card) 70'	Stadium: Central Stadium; Attendance: 13,500; Referee: Marat Iskakov

1 June 2014 15	Atyrau	3 – 2	Shakhter Karagandy	Atyrau
18:00 (UTC+6)	Karpovich 35'; Blažić 54'; Trifunović 85' (pen.)	Summary	Yago 61'; T.Zhangylyshbai 74'; Murzoev (yellow card) 74'; Simčević (yellow card) 85'	Stadium: Munaishy Stadium; Attendance: 5,000; Referee: Ruslan Duzmambetov

14 June 2014 16	Spartak Semey	2 – 1	Atyrau	Semey
18:00 (UTC+6)	Peev (yellow card) 37'; A.Yersalimov 49'; Azovskiy 63'; I.Amirseitov (yellow card) 75'; Genev (yellow card) 85'	Summary	Trifunović 8' (pen.); Plaskonny (yellow card) 62'; Savio (yellow card) 83'; Butuyev (yellow card) 86'	Stadium: Spartak Stadium; Attendance: 4,000; Referee: Denis Izmailov

22 June 2014 17	Atyrau	3 – 0	Taraz	Atyrau
20:00 (UTC+6)	Karpovich (yellow card) 8'; Trifunović 12' (pen.), 37'; Odibe 45' (yellow card) 89'; Plaskonny (yellow card) 51'; Abdulin (yellow card) 73'	Summary	D.Bashlay (yellow card) 62'	Stadium: Munaishy Stadium; Attendance: 2,500; Referee: Aleksandr Aliyev

28 June 2014 18	Atyrau	1 – 2	Zhetysu	Atyrau
20:00 (UTC+6)	Karpovich (yellow card) 36'; Rodionov 67' (o.g.)	Summary	Goa 10'; Kadio (yellow card) 37'; Rodionov (yellow card) 42' (goal) 85'; B.Tatishev (yellow card) 90'	Stadium: Munaishy Stadium; Attendance: 3,000; Referee: Denis Tevyashov

5 July 2014 19	Ordabasy	1 – 0	Atyrau	Shymkent
19:00 (UTC+6)	Diakate (yellow card) 37'; Kasyanov 76' (yellow card) 77'	Summary	Abdulin (yellow card) 37'; V.Chureyev (yellow card) 59'; Blažić (yellow card) 84'	Stadium: Kazhimukan Munaitpasov Stadium; Attendance: 2,500; Referee: Igor Chesnokov

13 July 2014 20	Atyrau	1 – 3	Kaisar	Atyrau
20:00 (UTC+6)	Trifunović 45+1' (pen.)	Summary	Hunt 8', 88'; Savić (yellow card) 58'; Coulibaly 63'	Stadium: Munaishy Stadium; Attendance: 3,000; Referee: Sergey Duzmambetov

27 July 2014 21	Astana	3 – 0	Atyrau	Astana
16:00 (UTC+6)	Kéthévoama 26', 56', 90+3' (yellow card) 90+4'	Summary	Adiyiah (yellow card) 54'	Stadium: Astana Arena; Attendance: 3,500; Referee: Askhat Abdanbayev

3 August 2014 22	Atyrau	0 – 3	Kairat	Atyrau
18:00 (UTC+6)		Summary	Gohou 23'; Abdulin 83' (o.g.); A.Darabayev 90+3'	Stadium: Munaishy Stadium; Attendance: 3,000; Referee: Igor Khisamutdinov

===== League table =====
Pos	Team	Pld	W	D	L	GF	GA	GD	Pts	Qualification
8	Tobol	22	6	8	8	22	29	−7	26	Qualification for the relegation round
9	Irtysh Pavlodar	22	6	6	10	28	35	−7	24 (Note: ATY 0–1 IRT; IRT 0-1 ATY)	Qualification for the relegation round
10	Atyrau	22	6	6	10	19	27	−8	24	Qualification for the relegation round
11	Taraz	22	5	4	13	21	34	−13	19	Qualification for the relegation round
12	Spartak Semey	22	3	5	14	16	41	−25	14	Qualification for the relegation round

Source: Soccerway (in Russian)
Rules for classification: 1st points;
Two team tiebreak: 1st overall wins; 2nd head-to-head record; 3rd goals difference; 4th goals scored; 5th away goals scored;
Multiple teams tiebreak: 1st overall wins; 2nd goals difference; 3rd goals scored; 4th away goals scored

==== Relegation Round ====
===== Results summary =====
Overall								Home						Away					
Pld	W	D	L	GF	GA	GD	Pts	W	D	L	GF	GA	GD	W	D	L	GF	GA	GD
10	4	1	5	11	16	−5	13	3	1	1	7	7	0	1	0	4	4	9	−5

Last updated: 9 November 2014.
Source: Soccerway

===== Results =====
23 August 2014 1	Tobol	1 – 2	Atyrau	Kostanay
19:00 (UTC+6)	Zhumaskaliyev 32'; Šimkovič (yellow card) 90'	Summary	Abdulin (yellow card) 49' (goal) 67'; A.Nurybekov 59' (yellow card) 61'; Plaskonny (yellow card) 70'	Stadium: Central Stadium; Attendance: 2,500; Referee: Bagdat Abdullaev

29 August 2014 2	Atyrau	2 – 1	Irtysh	Atyrau
18:30 (UTC+6)	Adiyiah 43'; Trifunović 51' (pen.)	Summary	Ivanov (yellow card) 9'; A.Ayaganov (yellow card) 50'; Z.Korobov (yellow card) 70'; Burzanović 78'	Stadium: Munaishy Stadium; Attendance: 1,500; Referee: Denis Izmailov

14 September 2014 3	Zhetysu	1 – 0	Atyrau	Taldykorgan
17:00 (UTC+6)	T.Danilyuk 15'; R.Sariyev (yellow card) 54'	Summary	Karpovich (yellow card) 13'; Abdulin (yellow card) 37'; E.Kostrub (yellow card) 83'	Stadium: Zhetysu Stadium; Attendance: 2,500; Referee: Ruslan Duzmambetov

20 September 2014 4	Taraz	2 – 1	Atyrau	Taraz
18:00 (UTC+6)	O.Yarovenko 61'; Dosmagambetov (yellow card) 78' (goal) 88'	Summary	Parkhachev (yellow card) 59'; Trifunović 79'	Stadium: Central Stadium; Attendance: 3,500; Referee: Denis Tevyashov

28 September 2014 5	Atyrau	1 – 1	Spartak Semey	Atyrau
17:00 (UTC+6)	E.Kostrub (yellow card) 5'; Trifunović 28'; Karpovich (yellow card) 76'	Summary	Jovanović 27' (yellow card) 43'; Peev (yellow card) 56'	Stadium: Munaishy Stadium; Attendance: 2,000; Referee: Askhat Abdanbayev

4 October 2014 6	Irtysh	2 – 0	Atyrau	Pavlodar
15:00 (UTC+6)	Chernyshov 49'; I.Yurin 79'	Summary	Butuyev (yellow card) 31'	Stadium: Central Stadium; Attendance: 1,500; Referee: Aleksandr Gauzer

19 October 2014 7	Atyrau	1 – 0	Zhetysu	Atyrau
17:00 (UTC+6)	Odibe 38'; Butuyev (yellow card) 90+2'	Summary	K.Zotov (yellow card) 49'; Klimavičius (yellow card) 61'	Stadium: Munaishy Stadium; Attendance: 800; Referee: Igor Aleshin

25 October 2014 8	Atyrau	3 – 2	Taraz	Atyrau
17:00 (UTC+6)	Adiyiah (yellow card) 10'; Trifunović 15' (pen.); A.Shakin 53'; Karpovich 55'; Blažić (yellow card) 71'	Summary	Dosmagambetov 19', 41'	Stadium: Munaishy Stadium; Attendance: 1,000; Referee: Anatolyi Vishnichenko

1 November 2014 9	Spartak Semey	3 – 1	Atyrau	Semey
15:00 (UTC+6)	B.Nurlibayev 5'; Rudzik (yellow card) 31'; Obradović (yellow card) 35'; Dyulgerov 84'; A.Sakenov 90+2'	Summary	A.Shakin (yellow card) 34'; Genev 64' (o.g.)	Stadium: Spartak Stadium; Attendance: 3,000; Referee: Aleksandr Gauzer

9 November 2014 10	Atyrau	0 – 3	Tobol	Atyrau
15:00 (UTC+6)	Trifunović (yellow card) 7'; Afanasyev (yellow card) 36'	Summary	Bogdanov (yellow card) 7' (yellow-red card) 64'; Zhumaskaliyev 20' (yellow card) 35'; O.Krasić 41'; R.Dzhalilov 90+2'	Stadium: Munaishy Stadium; Attendance: 1,500; Referee: Ruslan Duzmambetov

===== Table =====
Pos	Team	Pld	W	D	L	GF	GA	GD	Pts	Relegation
7	Tobol (Note: Tobol have had 3 point(s) deducted.)	32	10	12	10	35	35	0	26	
8	Zhetysu	32	10	8	14	21	31	−10	25	
9	Atyrau	32	10	7	15	30	43	−13	25	
10	Irtysh Pavlodar	32	9	10	13	39	44	−5	25	
11	Taraz (O)	32	9	7	16	32	45	−13	25	Qualification for the relegation play-off

Source: Soccerway (in Russian)
Rules for classification: 1st points;
Two team tiebreak: 1st overall wins; 2nd head-to-head record; 3rd goals difference; 4th goals scored; 5th away goals scored;
Multiple teams tiebreak: 1st overall wins; 2nd goals difference; 3rd goals scored; 4th away goals scored.
Team start with half number of points from first round.
(O) Play-off winners

=== Kazakhstan Cup ===
23 April 2014 First Round	Bolat	0 – 2	Atyrau	Temirtau
17:00 (UTC+6)		Summary; Report	Gridin 54'; Essame 71'	Stadium: Metallurg Stadium; Attendance: 150; Referee: Bagdat Abdulaiev

14 May 2014 Second Round	Vostok	1 – 2 (a.e.t.)	Atyrau	Oskemen
16:00 (UTC+6)	I.Shevchenko (yellow card) 15'; A.Shabaev (yellow card) 23'; S.Ibraev (yellow card) 42' (red card) 81'; Januzakov 85'; A.Moltussinov (yellow card) 98'	Summary	Trifunović 5'; A.Shakin (yellow card) 40'; Essame (yellow card) 50'; Parkhachev 118'	Stadium: Vostok Stadium; Attendance: 1,000; Referee: Ruslan Omarov

18 June 2014 Quarter-final	Atyrau	1 – 3	Kairat	Atyrau
19:30 (UTC+6)	Trifunović 38'	Summary	Darabayev 59'; Islamkhan 66'; Knežević 70'	Stadium: Munaishy Stadium; Attendance: 4,000; Referee: Igor Khisamutdinov

== Squad statistics ==
As of Match played 9 November 2014

=== Appearances and goals ===
No.	Pos	Nat	Player	Total		Premier League		Kazakhstan Cup	
No.	Pos	Nat	Player	Apps	Goals	Apps	Goals	Apps	Goals
1	GK	(Kazakhstan) KAZ	Andrey Shabanov	31	0	29	0	2	0
3	DF	(Belarus) BLR	Pavel Plaskonny	25	0	19+4	0	2	0
6	FW	(Kazakhstan) KAZ	Aleksey Shakin	14	1	4+9	1	1	0
8	DF	(Kazakhstan) KAZ	Valentin Chureyev	15	0	10+4	0	1	0
10	MF	(Georgia (country)) GEO	George Peikrishvili	10	0	3+6	0	0+1	0
13	MF	(Kazakhstan) KAZ	Aibar Nurybekov	16	1	5+10	1	0+1	0
14	FW	(Serbia) SRB	Miloš Trifunović	34	15	31+1	13	2	2
18	DF	(Belarus) BLR	Mikhail Afanasyev	30	0	22+5	0	1+2	0
20	DF	(Nigeria) NGR	Michael Odibe	27	2	27	2	0	0
21	MF	(Kazakhstan) KAZ	Andrei Karpovich	28	2	25	2	2+1	0
23	DF	(Kazakhstan) KAZ	Rinat Abdulin	34	1	31	1	3	0
27	MF	(Kazakhstan) KAZ	Evgeny Kostrub	29	0	22+4	0	3	0
28	MF	(Belarus) BLR	Dmitri Parkhachev	26	2	13+10	1	1+2	1
30	GK	(Kazakhstan) KAZ	Anton Tsirin	4	0	3	0	1	0
32	MF	(Kazakhstan) KAZ	Marat Shakhmetov	10	0	5+5	0	0	0
33	DF	(Russia) RUS	Marat Butuyev	34	0	29+2	0	3	0
40	FW	(Ghana) GHA	Dominic Adiyiah	14	1	10+4	1	0	0
46	MF	(Serbia) SRB	Marko Blažić	33	1	28+2	1	3	0
	DF	(Kazakhstan) KAZ	Zhaksylyk Khalelov	1	0	0+1	0	0	0
Players away from Atyrau on loan:
7	MF	(Cameroon) CMR	Guy Essame	21	3	17+1	2	3	1
Players who appeared for Atyrau that left during the season:
5	DF	(Kazakhstan) KAZ	Kirill Pasichnik	3	0	1	0	1+1	0
17	FW	(Kazakhstan) KAZ	Sergey Gridin	7	2	0+6	1	1	1
22	MF	(Belarus) BLR	Filip Rudzik	14	1	8+4	1	2	0
77	MF	(Germany) GER	Savio Nsereko	11	1	10	1	1	0
86	FW	(Belarus) BLR	Aliaksei Kuchuk	5	0	0+5	0	0	0
91	FW	(Kazakhstan) KAZ	Aleksey Shchetkin	2	0	0+2	0	0	0

=== Goal scorers ===
Place	Position	Nation	Number	Name	Premier League	Kazakhstan Cup	Total
1	FW	(Serbia)	14	Miloš Trifunović	13	2	15
2	MF	(Cameroon)	7	Guy Essame	2	1	3
3	MF	(Kazakhstan)	21	Andrei Karpovich	2	0	2
3	DF	(Nigeria)	20	Michael Odibe	2	0	2
3				Own goal	2	0	2
3	MF	(Belarus)	28	Dmitri Parkhachev	1	1	2
3	FW	(Kazakhstan)	17	Sergey Gridin	1	1	2
8	MF	(Germany)	77	Savio Nsereko	1	0	1
8	MF	(Belarus)	22	Filip Rudzik	1	0	1
8	MF	(Serbia)	46	Marko Blažić	1	0	1
8	DF	(Kazakhstan)	23	Rinat Abdulin	1	0	1
8	MF	(Kazakhstan)	13	Aibar Nurybekov	1	0	1
8	FW	(Ghana)	40	Dominic Adiyiah	1	0	1
8	MF	(Kazakhstan)	6	Aleksey Shakin	1	0	1
				TOTALS	30	5	35

=== Disciplinary record ===
Number	Nation	Position	Name	Premier League		Kazakhstan Cup		Total	
Number	Nation	Position	Name	Yellow card	Red card	Yellow card	Red card	Yellow card	Red card
1	(Kazakhstan)	GK	Andrey Shabanov	1	0	0	0	1	0
3	(Belarus)	DF	Pavel Plaskonny	3	0	0	0	3	0
5	(Kazakhstan)	DF	Kirill Pasichnik	1	0	0	0	1	0
6	(Kazakhstan)	MF	Aleksey Shakin	2	0	1	0	3	0
7	(Cameroon)	MF	Guy Essame	2	0	1	0	3	0
8	(Kazakhstan)	DF	Valentin Chureyev	1	0	0	0	1	0
13	(Kazakhstan)	MF	Aibar Nurybekov	1	0	0	0	1	0
14	(Serbia)	FW	Miloš Trifunović	1	0	0	0	1	0
18	(Belarus)	MF	Mikhail Afanasyev	2	0	0	0	2	0
20	(Nigeria)	DF	Michael Odibe	3	1	0	0	3	1
21	(Kazakhstan)	MF	Andrei Karpovich	10	0	0	0	10	0
22	(Belarus)	MF	Filip Rudzik	2	0	0	0	2	0
23	(Kazakhstan)	DF	Rinat Abdulin	5	0	0	0	5	0
27	(Kazakhstan)	MF	Evgeny Kostrub	5	0	0	0	5	0
28	(Belarus)	MF	Dmitri Parkhachev	3	0	0	0	3	0
33	(Russia)	DF	Marat Butuyev	4	0	0	0	4	0
40	(Ghana)	FW	Dominic Adiyiah	2	0	0	0	2	0
46	(Serbia)	MF	Marko Blažić	3	0	0	0	3	0
77	(Germany)	MF	Savio Nsereko	5	0	0	0	5	0
			TOTALS	56	1	2	0	58	1
