= 2015 FC Atyrau season =

FC Atyrau
2015 season
- Chairman: Zheksenbai Kusainov
- Manager: Vladimir Nikitenko
- Stadium: Munaishy Stadium
- Kazakhstan Premier League: 5th
- Kazakhstan Cup: Second round vs Zhetysu
- Top goalscorer: League: two players (5); All: goal scorers (5)
Home colours	Away colours

The 2015 FC Atyrau season is the 15th successive season that the club will play in the Kazakhstan Premier League, the highest tier of association football in Kazakhstan.

== Squad ==
As of 25 June 2015

Note: Flags indicate national team as defined under FIFA eligibility rules; some limited exceptions apply. Players may hold more than one non-FIFA nationality.

No.	Pos.	Nation	Player
1	GK	KAZ	Ilya Bayteryakov
5	MF	KAZ	Bekzhan Onzhan
7	MF	CMR	Guy Essame
8	DF	KAZ	Valentin Chureyev
9	MF	UKR	Volodymyr Arzhanov
10	MF	KAZ	Konstantin Zarechny
11	MF	KAZ	Maksat Baizhanov
12	DF	KAZ	Ruslan Esatov
20	DF	NGR	Michael Odibe
21	MF	KAZ	Aleksei Marov
22	MF	SEN	Abdoulaye Diakate

No.	Pos.	Nation	Player
23	DF	RUS	Anton Grigoryev
24	FW	UKR	Ruslan Fomin
28	DF	KAZ	Vladislav Kuzmin
29	DF	KAZ	Berik Aitbayev
34	GK	KAZ	Zhasur Narzikulov
39	FW	KAZ	Murat Tleshev
66	DF	KAZ	Anton Chichulin
85	MF	BLR	Dmitri Parkhachev
91	DF	KAZ	Azamat Izbasarov
99	FW	MNE	Ivan Ivanović

=== Reserve team ===
Note: Flags indicate national team as defined under FIFA eligibility rules; some limited exceptions apply. Players may hold more than one non-FIFA nationality.

No.	Pos.	Nation	Player
2	DF	KAZ	Dauren Mazhitov
3	DF	KAZ	Zhaksylyk Halel
4	DF	KAZ	Nauryzbek Kalybai
6	MF	KAZ	Altynbek Saparov
15	FW	KAZ	Baktiyar Gabdollin
17	FW	KAZ	Bauirzhan Kassymov
18	DF	KAZ	Kuanish Kalmuratov
19	FW	KAZ	Kasymhan Nakpaev
25	MF	KAZ	Islam Satiev
27	MF	KAZ	Abilmansur Rochet
30	MF	KAZ	Mohammed Saktash
32	MF	KAZ	Aidos Ershmanov
35	GK	KAZ	Azamat Zhomart

No.	Pos.	Nation	Player
37	DF	KAZ	Ruslan Muftolla
46	FW	KAZ	Aybolat Maku
47	MF	KAZ	Alikhan Otaraly
61	DF	KAZ	Vyacheslav Borovoy
63	GK	KAZ	Baibek Tusipov
74	MF	KAZ	Rinat Jumati
77	MF	KAZ	Meyrzhan Kupiev
79	MF	KAZ	Alisher akyns
88	MF	KAZ	Rafael Ospanov
97	DF	KAZ	Zharas Mellyatov
98	MF	KAZ	Nauryzbek Zhagora
95	DF	KAZ	Timur Sundetov

== Transfers ==
=== Winter ===
In: Note: Flags indicate national team as defined under FIFA eligibility rules; some limited exceptions apply. Players may hold more than one non-FIFA nationality.

No.	Pos.	Nation	Player
1	GK	KAZ	Ilya Bayteryakov
7	MF	CMR	Guy Essame (loan return from (Kazakhstan) Astana)
9	MF	UKR	Volodymyr Arzhanov (from (Ukraine) Chornomorets Odesa)
10	MF	KAZ	Konstantin Zarechny (from (Kazakhstan) Zhetysu)
11	MF	KAZ	Maksat Baizhanov (from (Kazakhstan) Shakhter Karagandy)
12	DF	KAZ	Ruslan Esatov (from (Kazakhstan) Zhetysu)
21	MF	KAZ	Aleksei Marov
22	MF	SEN	Abdoulaye Diakate (from (Kazakhstan) Ordabasy)
23	DF	RUS	Anton Grigoryev (from (Moldova) Veris Chișinău)
28	DF	KAZ	Vladislav Kuzmin (from (Kazakhstan) Zhetysu)
29	DF	KAZ	Berik Aitbayev (from (Kazakhstan) Taraz)
34	GK	KAZ	Zhasur Narzikulov (from (Kazakhstan) Taraz)
39	FW	KAZ	Murat Tleshev (from (Kazakhstan) Taraz)
66	DF	KAZ	Anton Chichulin (from (Turkey) Giresunspor)
99	FW	MNE	Ivan Ivanović (from (Montenegro) FK Rudar)

Out: Note: Flags indicate national team as defined under FIFA eligibility rules; some limited exceptions apply. Players may hold more than one non-FIFA nationality.

No.	Pos.	Nation	Player
1	GK	KAZ	Andrey Shabanov (to (Kazakhstan) Zhetysu)
3	DF	BLR	Pavel Plaskonny (to (Belarus) Vitebsk)
6	MF	KAZ	Aleksey Shakin
10	MF	GEO	George Peikrishvili
18	MF	BLR	Mikhail Afanasyev (to (Belarus) Shakhtyor Soligorsk)
21	MF	KAZ	Andrei Karpovich (to (Kazakhstan) Shakhter Karagandy)
23	DF	KAZ	Rinat Abdulin (to (Kazakhstan) Ordabasy)
27	MF	KAZ	Evgeny Kostrub (to (Kazakhstan) Shakhter Karagandy)
30	GK	KAZ	Anton Tsirin (to (Kazakhstan) Okzhetpes)
32	MF	KAZ	Marat Shakhmetov (loan return to (Kazakhstan) Astana)
33	DF	RUS	Marat Butuyev
40	FW	GHA	Dominic Adiyiah (to (Thailand) Nakhon Ratchasima)
46	MF	SRB	Marko Blažić
90	GK	KAZ	Nurbolat Kalmenov

=== Summer ===
In: Note: Flags indicate national team as defined under FIFA eligibility rules; some limited exceptions apply. Players may hold more than one non-FIFA nationality.

No.	Pos.	Nation	Player
24	FW	UKR	Ruslan Fomin (from (Azerbaijan) Gabala)

Out: Note: Flags indicate national team as defined under FIFA eligibility rules; some limited exceptions apply. Players may hold more than one non-FIFA nationality.

No.	Pos.	Nation	Player
13	MF	KAZ	Aibar Nurybekov (to (Kazakhstan) Shakhter Karagandy)
14	FW	SRB	Miloš Trifunović (to (Serbia) Radnički Niš)

== Competitions ==
=== Kazakhstan Premier League ===
==== First round ====
===== Results summary =====
Overall								Home						Away					
Pld	W	D	L	GF	GA	GD	Pts	W	D	L	GF	GA	GD	W	D	L	GF	GA	GD
22	8	10	4	23	21	+2	34	4	4	3	11	11	0	4	6	1	12	10	+2

Last updated: 28 July 2015.
Source: Soccerway

===== Results by round =====
Round	1	2	3	4	5	6	7	8	9	10	11	12	13	14	15	16	17	18	19	20	21	22
Ground	A	H	A	H	A	H	A	H	A	H	A	A	H	A	H	A	H	A	H	A	H	H
Result	D	W	L	D	D	L	W	W	W	W	W	W	D	D	W	D	L	D	D	D	D	L
Position	4	3	6	7	7	10	7	6	5	5	4	3	4	3	2	4	4	4	4	4	4	4

Source: Soccerway
A = Away; H = Home; W = Win; D = Draw; L = Loss

===== Results =====
7 March 2015 1	Aktobe	1–1	Atyrau	Aktobe
16:00 (UTC+6)	D.Zhalmukan 63'; Mineiro (yellow card) 66'; A.Tagybergen (yellow card) 90+3'	Summary	Baizhanov 42'; B.Kasymov (yellow card) 90+2'	Stadium: Central Stadium; Attendance: 3,000; Referee: Denis Tevyashov

11 March 2015 2	Atyrau	2–1	Taraz	Atyrau
15:00 (UTC+6)	Trifunović 28' (yellow card) 46'; Baizhanov 89'; Tleshev (yellow card) 90+1'; Ivanović (yellow card) 90+2'	Summary	Golić 6'; D.Vasiljev (yellow card) 17' (red card) 90+1'	Stadium: Munaishy Stadium; Attendance: 1,850; Referee: Anatolyi Vishnichenko

14 March 2015 3	Ordabasy	2–0	Atyrau	Shymkent
(UTC+6)	Petrov (yellow card) 23'; Nurgaliev 38' (yellow card) 85'; Simčević (yellow card) 58'; Tazhimbetov (yellow card) 74'; Malyi (yellow card) 81'	Summary		Stadium: Kazhimukan Munaitpasov Stadium; Attendance: 3,000; Referee: Aleksandr Aliyev

21 March 2015 4	Atyrau	1–1	Astana	Atyrau
16:00 (UTC+6)	Baizhanov 63'	Summary	Nusserbayev (yellow card) 54'; Grigoryev 56' (o.g.); Cañas (yellow card) 61'	Stadium: Munaishy Stadium; Attendance: 2,000; Referee: Aydin Rakhimbayev

5 April 2015 5	Kaisar	0–0	Atyrau	Kyzylorda
16:00 (UTC+6)	Shestakov (yellow card) 60'; Nekhtiy (yellow card) 68'	Summary	Essame (yellow card) 82'	Stadium: Gany Muratbayev Stadium; Attendance: 3,000; Referee: Aleksandr Gauzer

11 April 2015 6	Atyrau	1–2	Tobol	Atyrau
16:00 (UTC+6)	Arzhanov 70'; Odibe (yellow card) 74' (yellow-red card) 89'	Summary	Kalu 36'; O.Krasić (yellow card) 61'; Bugaiov 74' (pen.) (yellow card) 80'	Stadium: Munaishy Stadium; Attendance: 2,000; Referee: Denis Izmailov

15 April 2015 7	Zhetysu	1–2	Atyrau	Taldykorgan
17:00 (UTC+6)	S.Sariyev (yellow card) 23'; Ergashev (yellow card) 31'; Savić 57'; T.Adilkhanov (yellow card) 74'; Despotović (yellow card) 85'; Cvetković (yellow card) 90+4'	Summary	Arzhanov 15' (pen.); Baizhanov 67'; Narzikulov (yellow card) 90+4'	Stadium: Zhetysu Stadium; Attendance: 1,000; Referee: Bolat Karlibayev

19 April 2015 8	Atyrau	2–1	Okzhetpes	Atyrau
17:00 (UTC+6)	B.Aitbayev 36'; Chichulin (yellow card) 44'; Diakate 67'	Summary	Di Chiara 63'; Chyzhov (yellow card) 66'	Stadium: Munaishy Stadium; Attendance: 3,000; Referee: Askhat Abdanbayev

25 April 2015 9	Irtysh	1–2	Atyrau	Pavlodar
15:00 (UTC+6)	Smakov (yellow card) 15' (goal) 67'; Samsonov (yellow card) 54'	Summary	V.Kuzmin (yellow card) 31'; Chichulin (yellow card) 52'; Essame 57'; Tleshev 69' (pen.)	Stadium: Central Stadium; Attendance: 3,000; Referee: Artyom Kuchin

3 May 2015 10	Atyrau	1–0	Shakhter Karagandy	Atyrau
19:00 (UTC+6)	Essame 68' (pen.); Parkhachev (yellow card) 89'	Summary	David (yellow card) 49'; Đidić (yellow card) 72'; Pokrivač (yellow card) 88'	Stadium: Munaishy Stadium; Attendance: 5,500; Referee: Igor Chesnokov

7 May 2015 11	Kairat	0–1	Atyrau	Almaty
17:00 (UTC+6)	Marković (yellow card) 77'	Summary	Parkhachev 56'; K.Zarechny (yellow card) 70'; Arzhanov (yellow card) 77'; Narzikulov (yellow card) 90+3'	Stadium: Central Stadium; Attendance: 9,000; Referee: Bagdat Abdullaev

16 May 2015 12	Taraz	0–1	Atyrau	Taraz
18:00 (UTC+6)	D.Bashlay (yellow card) 52'; Z.Kozhamberdy (yellow card) 84'	Summary	B.Aitbayev 6'; Essame (yellow card) 44'	Stadium: Central Stadium; Attendance: 5,500; Referee: Daniyar Sakhi

24 May 2015 13	Atyrau	1–1	Ordabasy	Atyrau
19:00 (UTC+6)	Tleshev (yellow card) 69'; Diakate (red card) 74'; Chichulin (yellow card) 80'; Simčević 90' (o.g.)	Summary	Nurgaliev (yellow card) 25'; Petrov (yellow card) 32'; T.Adyrbekov (yellow card) 44'; Trajković 74'	Stadium: Munaishy Stadium; Attendance: 7,500; Referee: Viktor Antonov

29 May 2015 14	Astana	0–0	Atyrau	Astana
17:00 (UTC+6)	Akhmetov (yellow card) 37'	Summary	R.Esatov (yellow card) 22'; Essame (yellow card) 37'; V.Kuzmin (yellow card) 50'; Arzhanov (yellow card) 90+1'; Grigoryev (yellow card) 90+4'	Stadium: Astana Arena; Attendance: 2,500; Referee: Denis Tevyashov

6 June 2015 15	Atyrau	2–1	Kaisar	Atyrau
20:00 (UTC+6)	Ivanović 19'; Grigoryev 52'; R.Esatov (yellow card) 55'	Summary	Strukov (yellow card) 17'; Mitošević (yellow card) 32'; J.Vorogovsky 45+1'; Irismetov (yellow card) 51'; Muldarov (yellow card) 74'	Stadium: Munaishy Stadium; Attendance: 6,500; Referee: Bolat Karlibayev

20 June 2015 16	Tobol	2–2	Atyrau	Kostanay
18:00 (UTC+6)	Klimavičius (yellow card) 9'; Sadownichy 49'; Yavorskyi 58'; Bugaiov (yellow card) 88'	Summary	Parkhachev (yellow card) 4'; Essame (yellow card) 31'; V.Kuzmin (yellow card) 35'; Grigoryev 36'; K.Zarechny 72'	Stadium: Central Stadium; Attendance: 2,000; Referee: Timur Kumashev

24 June 2015 17	Atyrau	1–2	Zhetysu	Atyrau
20:00 (UTC+6)	Grigoryev 30'	Summary	Savić 27', 71'; S.Sagyndykov (yellow card) 47'; Ergashev (yellow card) 65'	Stadium: Munaishy Stadium; Attendance: 5,000; Referee: Akmalkhan Kholmatov

28 June 2015 18	Okzhetpes	2–2	Atyrau	Kokshetau
19:00 (UTC+6)	Pawlaw (yellow card) 51' (yellow-red card) 64'; Buleshev 53' (yellow card) 84'; Rotkovic 68'	Summary	Grigoryev 36'; Essame (yellow card) 67'; Chichulin (yellow card) 74'; Tleshev (yellow card) 88'; M.Tuliyev 90+3' (o.g.); Diakate (yellow card) 90+4'	Stadium: Okzhetpes Stadium; Attendance: 2,200; Referee: Marat Iskakov

4 July 2015 19	Atyrau	0–0	Irtysh	Atyrau
20:00 (UTC+6)	Grigoryev (yellow card) 47'; Parkhachev (yellow card) 85'	Summary	Smakov (yellow card) 33'; N'Diaye (yellow card) 65'	Stadium: Munaishy Stadium; Attendance: 5,000; Referee: Askhat Abdanbayev

11 July 2015 20	Shakhter Karagandy	1–1	Atyrau	Karaganda
18:00 (UTC+6)	Vasiljević 78'	Summary	Diakate (yellow card) 29'; Essame 84'	Stadium: Shakhter Stadium; Attendance: 2,500; Referee: Igor Aleshin

19 July 2015 21	Atyrau	0–0	Kairat	Atyrau
20:00 (UTC+6)	V.Kuzmin (yellow card) 71'; Essame (yellow card) 88'	Summary	T.Rudoselskiy (yellow card) 59'; Isael (yellow card) 62'; Soares (yellow card) 71'	Stadium: Munaishy Stadium; Attendance: 7,500; Referee: Igor Chesnokov

26 July 2015 22	Atyrau	0–2	Aktobe	Atyrau
20:00 (UTC+6)	Tleshev (yellow card) 54'	Summary	Khizhnichenko 10'; Žulpa (yellow card) 20'; Pizzelli 46'; D.Zhalmukan (yellow card) 58'	Stadium: Munaishy Stadium; Attendance: 6,000; Referee: Viktor Antonov

===== League table =====
Pos	Team	Pld	W	D	L	GF	GA	GD	Pts	Qualification
2	Aktobe	22	12	8	2	27	12	+15	44	Qualification for the championship round
3	Astana	22	12	7	3	40	19	+21	43	Qualification for the championship round
4	Atyrau	22	9	10	3	25	19	+6	37	Qualification for the championship round
5	Ordabasy	22	9	8	5	21	18	+3	35	Qualification for the championship round
6	Irtysh Pavlodar	22	7	9	6	26	23	+3	30	Qualification for the championship round

Source: UEFA.com, Soccerway
Rules for classification: 1) Points; 2) Matches won; 3) Head-to-head points; 4) Head-to-head matches won; 5) Head-to-head goal difference; 6) Head-to-head goals scored; 7) Head-to-head away goals scored; 8) Goal difference; 9) Goals scored; 10) Away goals scored; 11) Draw.

==== Championship round ====
===== Results summary =====
Overall								Home						Away					
Pld	W	D	L	GF	GA	GD	Pts	W	D	L	GF	GA	GD	W	D	L	GF	GA	GD
10	2	2	6	5	13	−8	8	1	1	3	3	6	−3	1	1	3	2	7	−5

Last updated: 2 November 2015.
Source: Soccerway

===== Results by round =====
Round	1	2	3	4	5	6	7	8	9	10
Ground	A	H	A	H	H	A	H	A	A	H
Result	L	L	L	L	L	D	D	L	W	W
Position	4	5	6	6	6	6	6	6	6	5

Source: Soccerway
A = Away; H = Home; W = Win; D = Draw; L = Loss

===== Results =====
15 August 2015 23	Irtysh	2–0	Atyrau	Pavlodar
19:00 (UTC+6)	Kassaï 37'; Smakov (yellow card) 74'; Roncatto (yellow card) 82', (goal) 87'; Kislitsyn (yellow card) 84'	Summary	R.Esatov (yellow card) 34'; V.Kuzmin (yellow card) 80'	Stadium: Central Stadium; Attendance: 4,500; Referee: Marat Iskakov

22 August 2015 24	Astana	Postponed	Atyrau	Astana
17:00 (UTC+6)		[ Summary]		Stadium: Astana Arena

12 September 2015 25	Atyrau	1–2	Kairat	Atyrau
18:00 (UTC+6)	Essame 17'	Summary	Islamkhan 64'; Gohou 79'	Stadium: Munaishy Stadium; Attendance: 4,500; Referee: Igor Aleshin

20 September 2015 26	Aktobe	1–0	Atyrau	Aktobe
17:00 (UTC+6)	Danilo 71'; Deac (yellow card) 82'	Summary	Odibe (yellow card) 53'; Essame (yellow card) 90+4'	Stadium: Central Stadium; Attendance: 7,800; Referee: Aydin Rakhimbayev

26 September 2015 27	Atyrau	1–3	Ordabasy	Atyrau
17:30 (UTC+6)	Arzhanov 16'; Grigoryev (yellow card) 60'; V.Kuzmin (yellow card) 90+4'	Summary	Simčević 30' (yellow card) 52'; Junuzović 38', 61'; Trajković (yellow card) 41'; Malyi (yellow card) 60'	Stadium: Munaishy Stadium; Attendance: 4,000; Referee: Marat Iskakov

4 October 2015 28	Atyrau	0–1	Astana	Atyrau
17:00 (UTC+6)	V.Kuzmin (yellow card) 23'; Odibe (yellow card) 53'; Diakate (yellow card) 76'; K.Zarechny (yellow card) 86'	Summary	Muzhikov (yellow card) 62'; Nusserbayev 80'	Stadium: Munaishy Stadium; Attendance: 2,200; Referee: Artyom Kuchin

17 October 2015 29	Kairat	0–0	Atyrau	Almaty
18:00 (UTC+6)		Summary	Fomin (yellow card) 89'; Narzikulov (yellow card) 90+2'	Stadium: Central Stadium; Attendance: 5,500; Referee: Bagdat Abdullaev

24 October 2015 30	Atyrau	1–1	Aktobe	Atyrau
17:00 (UTC+6)	Diakate 28'	Summary	Dmitrenko 15'; Khizhnichenko (yellow card) 74'; Adeleye (yellow card) 87'	Stadium: Munaishy Stadium; Attendance: 1,700; Referee: Denis Tevyashov

28 October 2015 24	Astana	4–1	Atyrau	Astana
18:00 (UTC+6)	Cañas 13'; Beisebekov 23'; Nusserbayev 74'; Kabananga 90+2'	Summary	Arzhanov 29'; Fomin (yellow card) 65'	Stadium: Astana Arena; Referee: Ruslan Duzmambetov

31 October 2015 31	Ordabasy	0–1	Atyrau	Shymkent
15:00 (UTC+6)	Junuzović (yellow card) 39'; Petrov (yellow card) 65'; Trajković (yellow card) 73'	Summary	Arzhanov 30'; Diakate (yellow card) 55'; R.Esatov (yellow card) 75'; Chichulin (yellow card) 90+4'	Stadium: Kazhymukan Munaitpasov Stadium; Attendance: 2,500; Referee: Denis Izmailov

8 November 2015 32	Atyrau	1–0	Irtysh	Atyrau
15:00 (UTC+6)	Baizhanov 40'	Summary		Stadium: Munaishy Stadium; Attendance: 2,500; Referee: Artyom Kuchin

===== League table =====
Pos	Team	Pld	W	D	L	GF	GA	GD	Pts	Qualification
1	Astana (C)	32	20	7	5	55	26	+29	46	Qualification for the Champions League second qualifying round
2	Kairat	32	20	7	5	60	19	+41	45	Qualification for the Europa League first qualifying round (Note: Kairat qualified for the UEFA Europa League first qualifying round by winning the 2015 Kazakhstan Cup.)
3	Aktobe	32	15	9	8	35	25	+10	32	Qualification for the Europa League first qualifying round
4	Ordabasy	32	12	10	10	32	31	+1	29	Qualification for the Europa League first qualifying round
5	Atyrau	32	11	12	9	31	33	−2	27	
6	Irtysh Pavlodar	32	10	10	12	37	39	−2	25	

Source: Soccerway
Rules for classification: 1) Points; 2) Play-off (only if deciding champion when two teams are tied); 3) Matches won; 4) Head-to-head points; 5) Head-to-head matches won; 6) Head-to-head goal difference; 7) Head-to-head goals scored; 8) Head-to-head away goals scored; 9) Goal difference; 10) Goals scored; 11) Away goals scored; 12) Play-off (only if deciding champion when three or teams are tied); 13) Draw.
(C) Champions

=== Kazakhstan Cup ===
29 April 2015 Second round	Atyrau	0–1	Zhetysu	Atyrau
18:00 (UTC+6)	A.Marov (yellow card) 69'; Diakate (yellow card) 88'; Essame (yellow card) 88'	Report	Savić (yellow card) 77'; Turysbek 79'	Stadium: Munaishy Stadium; Attendance: 4,000; Referee: Denis Tevyashov

== Squad statistics ==
As of Match played 8 November 2015

=== Appearances and goals ===
No.	Pos	Nat	Player	Total		Premier League		Kazakhstan Cup	
No.	Pos	Nat	Player	Apps	Goals	Apps	Goals	Apps	Goals
1	GK	(Kazakhstan) KAZ	Ilya Bayteryakov	5	0	4	0	1	0
6	MF	(Kazakhstan) KAZ	Altynbek Saparov	7	0	6+1	0	0	0
7	MF	(Cameroon) CMR	Guy Essame	32	4	31	4	1	0
8	DF	(Kazakhstan) KAZ	Valentin Chureyev	6	0	5	0	0+1	0
9	MF	(Ukraine) UKR	Volodymyr Arzhanov	33	5	30+2	5	1	0
10	MF	(Kazakhstan) KAZ	Konstantin Zarechny	19	1	6+13	1	0	0
11	MF	(Kazakhstan) KAZ	Maksat Baizhanov	26	5	24+2	5	0	0
12	DF	(Kazakhstan) KAZ	Ruslan Esatov	24	0	19+4	0	1	0
17	FW	(Kazakhstan) KAZ	Bauirzhan Kassymov	3	0	0+3	0	0	0
18	DF	(Kazakhstan) KAZ	Kuanish Kalmuratov	20	0	18+2	0	0	0
20	DF	(Nigeria) NGR	Michael Odibe	21	0	16+4	0	1	0
21	MF	(Kazakhstan) KAZ	Aleksei Marov	12	0	8+3	0	1	0
22	MF	(Senegal) SEN	Abdoulaye Diakate	25	2	23+1	2	1	0
23	DF	(Russia) RUS	Anton Grigoryev	32	4	31	4	1	0
24	FW	(Ukraine) UKR	Ruslan Fomin	12	0	6+6	0	0	0
28	DF	(Kazakhstan) KAZ	Vladislav Kuzmin	25	0	18+6	0	1	0
29	DF	(Kazakhstan) KAZ	Berik Aitbayev	20	2	18+2	2	0	0
34	GK	(Kazakhstan) KAZ	Zhasur Narzikulov	28	0	28	0	0	0
39	FW	(Kazakhstan) KAZ	Murat Tleshev	19	1	3+16	1	0	0
66	DF	(Kazakhstan) KAZ	Anton Chichulin	29	0	25+4	0	0	0
85	MF	(Belarus) BLR	Dmitri Parkhachev	20	1	14+5	1	1	0
99	FW	(Montenegro) MNE	Ivan Ivanović	25	1	12+12	1	0+1	0
Players away from Atyrau on loan:
Players who appeared for Atyrau that left during the season:
13	MF	(Kazakhstan) KAZ	Aibar Nurybekov	7	0	3+3	0	1	0
14	FW	(Serbia) SRB	Miloš Trifunović	10	1	4+5	1	1	0

=== Goal scorers ===
Place	Position	Nation	Number	Name	Premier League	Kazakhstan Cup	Total
1	MF	(Ukraine)	9	Volodymyr Arzhanov	5	0	5
1	MF	(Kazakhstan)	11	Maksat Baizhanov	5	0	5
3	DF	(Russia)	23	Anton Grigoryev	4	0	4
3	MF	(Cameroon)	7	Guy Essame	4	0	4
5	DF	(Kazakhstan)	29	Berik Aitbayev	2	0	2
5	MF	(Senegal)	22	Abdoulaye Diakate	2	0	2
5				Own goal	2	0	2
6	FW	(Serbia)	14	Miloš Trifunović	1	0	1
6	FW	(Kazakhstan)	39	Murat Tleshev	1	0	1
6	MF	(Belarus)	85	Dmitri Parkhachev	1	0	1
6	FW	(Montenegro)	99	Ivan Ivanović	1	0	1
6	MF	(Kazakhstan)	10	Konstantin Zarechny	1	0	1
				TOTALS	29	0	29

=== Disciplinary record ===
Number	Nation	Position	Name	Premier League		Kazakhstan Cup		Total	
Number	Nation	Position	Name	Yellow card	Red card	Yellow card	Red card	Yellow card	Red card
7	(Cameroon)	MF	Guy Essame	7	0	1	0	8	0
9	(Ukraine)	MF	Volodymyr Arzhanov	2	0	0	0	2	0
10	(Kazakhstan)	MF	Konstantin Zarechny	2	0	0	0	2	0
12	(Kazakhstan)	DF	Ruslan Esatov	4	0	0	0	4	0
14	(Serbia)	FW	Miloš Trifunović	1	0	0	0	1	0
17	(Kazakhstan)	FW	Bauyrzhan Kasymov	1	0	0	0	1	0
20	(Nigeria)	DF	Michael Odibe	4	1	0	0	4	1
21	(Kazakhstan)	MF	Aleksei Marov	0	0	1	0	1	0
22	(Senegal)	MF	Abdoulaye Diakate	4	1	1	0	5	1
23	(Russia)	DF	Anton Grigoryev	3	0	0	0	3	0
24	(Kazakhstan)	FW	Ruslan Fomin	2	0	0	0	2	0
28	(Kazakhstan)	DF	Vladislav Kuzmin	7	0	0	0	7	0
34	(Kazakhstan)	GK	Zhasur Narzikulov	3	0	0	0	3	0
39	(Kazakhstan)	FW	Murat Tleshev	4	0	0	0	4	0
66	(Kazakhstan)	DF	Anton Chichulin	5	0	0	0	5	0
85	(Belarus)	MF	Dmitri Parkhachev	3	0	0	0	3	0
99	(Montenegro)	FW	Ivan Ivanović	1	0	0	0	1	0
			TOTALS	53	2	3	0	56	2
