= Ruslan Fomin =

Ukrainian footballer

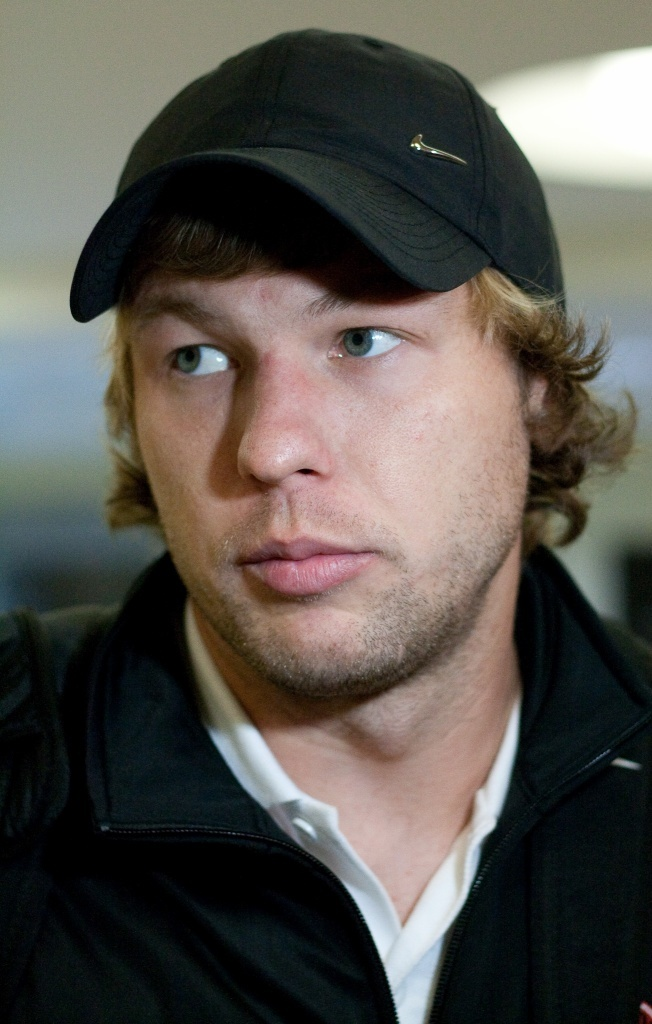

Personal information
- Full name: Ruslan Mykolayovych Fomin
- Date of birth: 2 March 1986 (age 40)
- Place of birth: Ruska Lozova, Soviet Union (now Ukraine)
- Height: 1.87 m (6 ft 2 in)
- Position: Forward

Team information
- Current team: Metalist Kharkiv (assistant)

Youth career
- 1999–2002: Arsenal Kharkiv

Senior career*
Years	Team	Apps	(Gls)
2002–2005	Arsenal Kharkiv	25	(4)
2005–2011	Shakhtar Donetsk	21	(2)
2005	→ Shakhtar-2 Donetsk	13	(2)
2005–2008	→ Metalist Kharkiv (loan)	56	(13)
2010–2011	→ Zorya Luhansk (loan)	14	(3)
2011–2014	Illichivets Mariupol	56	(11)
2014–2015	Chornomorets Odesa	13	(3)
2015	Gabala	16	(0)
2015	Atyrau	12	(0)
2016	Apollon Smyrnis	6	(0)
2016–2018	Mariupol	36	(14)
2018	Shakhtar Donetsk	0	(0)
2018–2020	Mariupol	33	(9)
2020–2022	Metalist Kharkiv	33	(11)
Total		334	(72)

International career^{‡}
2004	Ukraine U18	2	(0)
2004–2005	Ukraine U19	10	(5)
2005	Ukraine U20	1	(0)
2005–2008	Ukraine U21	20	(7)

Managerial career
- 2022–: Metalist Kharkiv (assistant)
Medal record
Men's football
Representing Ukraine
UEFA European Under-21 Championship
Runner-up	2006 Portugal
- * Club domestic league appearances and goals as of 9 July 2022 ‡ National team caps and goals as of 8 July 2018

Ruslan Fomin (Ukrainian: Руслан Миколайович Фомін; born 2 March 1986) is a Ukrainian retired footballer who played as a forward.

== Career ==
He was loaned to Metalist Kharkiv in 2007. Fomin was also a member of the Ukraine national under-21 football team, as well as a former member of the under-18 and under-19 national football teams.

On 16 January 2015, Fomin signed a six-month contract with Azerbaijan Premier League side Gabala FK. Fomin left Gabala at the end of his contract.

He played for Apollon Smyrnis in the Football League.

== Career statistics ==
=== Club ===
As of match played 28 August 2018

Club	Season	League		Cup		Europe		Total	
Club	Season	Apps	Goals	Apps	Goals	Apps	Goals	Apps	Goals
Arsenal	2002–03	1	0	0	0	0	0	1	0
Arsenal	2003–04	19	0	1	0	0	0	20	0
Arsenal	2004–05	5	4	1	0	0	0	6	4
Total		25	4	2	0	0	0	27	4
Shakhtar	2004–05	0	0	0	0	0	0	0	0
Shakhtar	2005–06	6	1	3	2	1	0	10	3
Shakhtar	2007–08	1	0	0	0	2	0	3	0
Shakhtar	2008–09	2	0	0	0	0	0	2	0
Shakhtar	2009–10	12	1	3	1	0	0	15	2
Shakhtar	2010–11	0	0	0	0	0	0	0	0
Shakhtar	2017–18	0	0	0	0	0	0	0	0
Total		21	2	6	3	3	0	30	5
Shakhtar-2 (loan)	2004–05	10	1	0	0	0	0	10	1
Shakhtar-2 (loan)	2005–06	3	1	0	0	0	0	3	1
Total		13	2	0	0	0	0	13	2
Metalist (loan)	2005–06	9	2	0	0	0	0	9	2
Metalist (loan)	2006–07	25	5	3	2	0	0	28	7
Metalist (loan)	2007–08	8	3	0	0	0	0	8	3
Metalist (loan)	2008–09	14	3	0	0	5	0	19	3
Total		56	13	3	2	5	0	64	15
Zorya (loan)	2010–11	14	3	2	1	0	0	16	4
Total		14	3	2	1	0	0	16	4
Illichivets (loan)	2011–12	24	5	1	0	0	0	25	5
Illichivets (loan)	2012–13	16	4	1	3	0	0	17	7
Illichivets (loan)	2013–14	16	2	1	0	0	0	17	2
Illichivets	2016–17	20	9	2	0	0	0	22	9
Illichivets	2017–18	16	5	1	0	0	0	17	5
Illichivets	2018–19	5	2	0	0	4	2	9	4
Total		97	27	6	3	4	2	107	32
Chornomorets	2014–15	13	3	2	0	2	0	17	3
Total		13	3	2	0	2	0	17	3
Gabala	2014–15	16	0	2	0	0	0	18	0
Total		16	0	2	0	0	0	18	0
Atyrau	2015	12	0	0	0	0	0	12	0
Total		12	0	0	0	0	0	12	0
Apollon Smyrnis	2015–16	6	0	0	0	0	0	6	0
Total		6	0	0	0	0	0	6	0
Career total		273	54	23	9	14	2	310	65

== Honours ==
=== Club ===
Shakhtar Donetsk

- Ukrainian Premier League: (4) 2005–06, 2007–08, 2009–10, 2017–18
- Ukrainian Cup: 2017–18

Illichivets Mariupol

- Ukrainian First League: 2016–17

Ukraine under-21

- UEFA Under-21 Championship: runner-up 2006
