= Vladimir Belyavskiy =

Belarusian footballer and manager

Personal information
- Full name: Vladimir Ivanovich Belyavskiy
- Date of birth: 27 June 1962 (age 64)
- Position: Defender

Team information
- Current team: Alania Vladikavkaz (assistant coach)

Senior career*
Years	Team	Apps	(Gls)
1992–1994	Shinnik Bobruisk	27	(2)

Managerial career
- 1997: Torpedo-Kadino Mogilev (assistant)
- 2005–2006: MTZ-RIPO Minsk (assistant)
- 2007: Belshina Bobruisk
- 2010: Ordabasy (assistant)
- 2011: Ordabasy
- 2012: Astana (academy coach)
- 2013–2014: Atyrau
- 2017–2022: Energetik-BGU Minsk
- 2022–: Alania Vladikavkaz (assistant)
- * Club domestic league appearances and goals

Vladimir Belyavskiy (Belarusian: Уладзімір Бяляўскі; Russian: Владимир Белявский; born 27 June 1962) is a Belarusian professional football coach and former player. He is an assistant coach with Alania Vladikavkaz.

Since 2010, Belyavskiy has been working closely with Anatoliy Yurevich as his assistant or co-coach.

== External sources ==
- Vladimir Belyavskiy at FootballFacts.ru (in Russian)
