= Miloš Trifunović (footballer) =

Serbian footballer

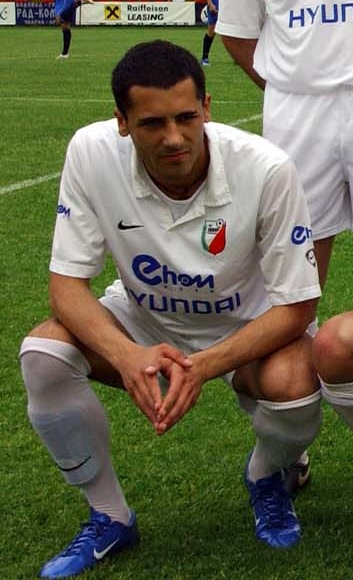
- Trifunović with Javor Ivanjica in 2008

Personal information
- Date of birth: 15 October 1984 (age 42)
- Place of birth: Belgrade, SFR Yugoslavia
- Height: 1.88 m (6 ft 2 in)
- Position: Forward

Youth career
- Red Star Belgrade

Senior career*
Years	Team	Apps	(Gls)
2002–2003	Ribnica Mionica	33	(19)
2003–2004	Beograd	20	(9)
2004–2005	Jedinstvo Bijelo Polje	45	(16)
2006	Carlstad United	1	(0)
2006-2007	Borac Čačak	9	(0)
2006	→ Javor Ivanjica(loan)	12	(7)
2007–2009	Javor Ivanjica	83	(27)
2010–2011	Red Star Belgrade	26	(8)
2011–2012	→ Bunyodkor (loan)	25	(22)
2012–2013	Liaoning Whowin	44	(13)
2014–2015	Atyrau	41	(14)
2015	Radnički Niš	7	(2)
2015–2016	Newcastle Jets	22	(9)
2016	Ordabasy	4	(0)
2016–2017	Vojvodina	12	(2)
2017	Radnik Surdulica	8	(5)
2017–2018	Mladost Lučani	29	(8)
2018–2019	AGMK	8	(1)
2019–2020	Rad	33	(4)

Managerial career
- 2020–2022: Rad (sporting director)
- * Club domestic league appearances and goals

Miloš Trifunović (Serbian Cyrillic: Милош Tpифунoвић, pronounced [mǐloʃ trifǔːnoʋitɕ]; born 15 October 1984) is a Serbian former footballer who played as a forward.

== Club career ==
After playing in the youth squad of the giants Red Star Belgrade, he started his senior career at minor clubs Ribnica Mionica and FK Beograd.

In summer 2004 he moved to Montenegrin club Jedinstvo Bijelo Polje where he will play for two years, playing the second, 2005–06, in the First League of Serbia and Montenegro.

In spring of 2006, he had a short spell at Swedish Carlstad United BK, before signing with Serbian SuperLiga club FK Borac Čačak, in the next season. After six months there, he was loaned for the rest of the season to FK Javor who will end up signing him permanently, and where he would stay until December 2009, when he transferred to Red Star, the club where he started playing.

Since begin of 2011 he played on loan for FC Bunyodkor in the season 2011. He transferred to Chinese club Liaoning Whowin F.C. at January 2012. In February 2014 the Trifunovic moved to Kazakh FC Atyrau. After two years spent in Kazakhstan, in July 2015 he returned to Serbian SuperLiga in uniform Radnički Niš. In September 2015, he signed for Newcastle Jets as a foreign player.

On 8 April 2016, Trifunović returned to the Kazakhstan Premier League, signing for FC Ordabasy. 2 months later, 8 June 2016, Trifunović left Ordabasy by mutual consent.

One month later, Trifunović signed a two-year deal with Serbian side Vojvodina. After a short spell with Radnik Surdulica in early 2017, Trifunović moved to Mladost Lučani in summer same year. In July 2018 moved to AGMK. In January 2019, Trifunović moved to Rad Belgrade on a free transfer.

=== Later career ===
After hanging up his boots in June 2020, Trifunović was immediately hired as sporting director of FK Rad. He was fired in March 2022.

== Career statistics ==
=== Club ===
As of 3 December 2017

Appearances and goals by club, season and competition
Club	Season	League			National Cup		Continental		Other		Total	
Club	Season	Division	Apps	Goals	Apps	Goals	Apps	Goals	Apps	Goals	Apps	Goals
Red Star Belgrade	2009–10	Serbian SuperLiga	11	2	2	3	—		—		13	5
Red Star Belgrade	2010–11	Serbian SuperLiga	15	6	3	2	2	1	—		20	9
Red Star Belgrade	Total		26	8	5	5	2	1	—		33	14
Bunyodkor (loan)	2011	Uzbek League	25	17	3	2	7	3	—		35	22
Liaoning Whowin	2012	Chinese Super League	24	8	4	4	—		—		28	12
Liaoning Whowin	2013	Chinese Super League	20	5	1	3	—		—		21	8
Liaoning Whowin	Total		44	13	5	7	—		—		49	20
Atyrau	2014	Kazakhstan Premier League	32	13	2	2	—		—		34	15
Atyrau	2015	Kazakhstan Premier League	9	1	1	0	—		—		10	1
Atyrau	Total		41	14	3	2	—		—		44	16
Radnički Niš	2015–16	Serbian SuperLiga	7	2	0	0	—		—		7	2
Newcastle Jets	2015–16	A-League	22	9	0	0	—		—		22	9
Ordabasy	2016	Kazakhstan Premier League	4	0	1	0	—		—		5	0
Vojvodina	2016–17	Serbian SuperLiga	12	2	0	0	4	0	—		16	2
Radnik Surdulica	2016–17	Serbian SuperLiga	8	5	0	0	—		—		8	5
Mladost Lučani	2017–18	Serbian SuperLiga	29	8	3	3	2	0	—		34	11
Career total			218	78	20	19	15	4	—		253	101

=== Club ===
Javor Ivanjica

- Serbian First League: 2007–08

Red Star Belgrade

- Serbian Cup (1): 2009–10

Bunyodkor

- Uzbek League (1): 2011

Mladost Lučani

- Serbian Cup runner up: 2017–18

FC AGMK

- Uzbek Cup (1): 2018

=== Individual ===
- Uzbek League Team of the Year (1): 2011
- Uzbek League Top Scorer (1): 2011
