= Savio Nsereko =

German footballer (born 1989)

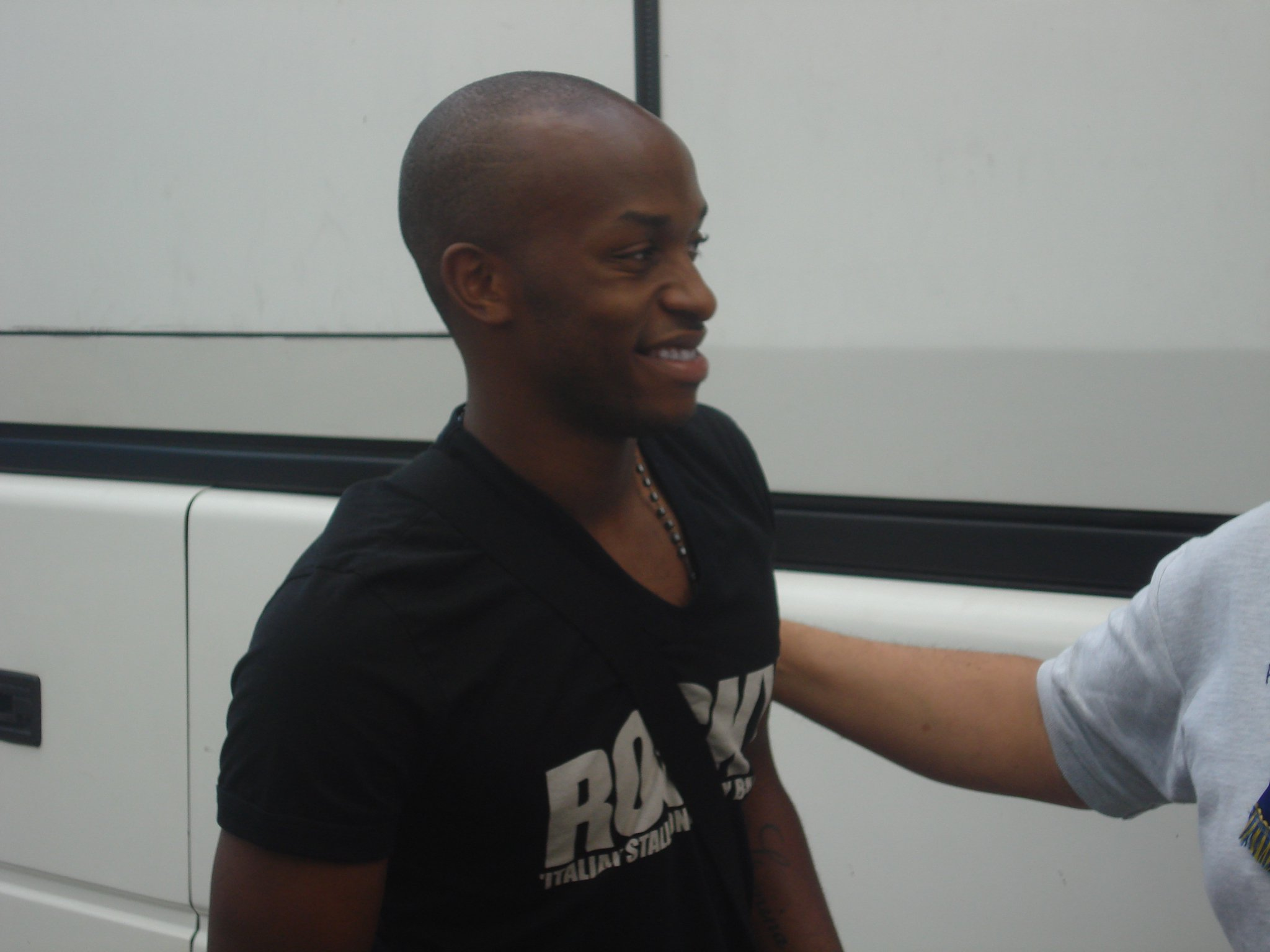
- Savio at Juve Stabia in 2011

Personal information
- Full name: Savio Magala Nsereko
- Date of birth: 27 July 1989 (age 37)
- Place of birth: Kampala, Uganda
- Height: 1.76 m (5 ft 9 in)
- Positions: Winger; forward

Team information
- Current team: BSC Sendling

Youth career
- 2004–2005: 1860 Munich
- 2005–2007: Brescia

Senior career*
Years	Team	Apps	(Gls)
2006–2009	Brescia	22	(3)
2009	West Ham United	10	(0)
2009–2012	Fiorentina	0	(0)
2010	→ Bologna (loan)	2	(0)
2010	→ 1860 Munich (loan)	2	(0)
2011	→ Chernomorets Burgas (loan)	11	(0)
2011	→ Juve Stabia (loan)	2	(0)
2012	→ Vaslui (loan)	2	(0)
2012	→ SpVgg Unterhaching (loan)	2	(0)
2013	Viktoria Köln	6	(0)
2013–2014	Atyrau	10	(1)
2015	Beroe	11	(0)
2016	Lietava Jonava	13	(0)
2017	Pipinsried	0	(0)
2018	Vereya	3	(0)
2019	Armin München	19	(21)
2020–	BSC Sendling	3	(0)

International career
2004–2005	Germany U16	7	(0)
2007–2008	Germany U19	11	(4)
2008–2010	Germany U20	3	(0)

Managerial career
- 2020–: BSC Sendling II
- * Club domestic league appearances and goals as of 19:49, 28 March 2021 (UTC)

Savio Magala Nsereko (born 27 July 1989) is a professional footballer who plays as a forward or winger for German club BSC Sendling.

Born in Uganda, Nsereko represented Germany internationally at youth level.

== Club career ==
=== Early career ===
Nsereko was born in Kampala and started his career at 1860 Munich. He was signed by Brescia in the summer of 2005, aged 16, the minimum age limit allowed by FIFA for international transfer among European Union nations.

He made his first team debut during 2005–06 Serie B season against Crotone, the last match of the season. He made 23 appearances for Brescia in all competitions, scoring three goals, before signing for West Ham.

=== West Ham United ===
On 26 January 2009, Nsereko signed for West Ham United for an undisclosed fee, thought to have been in the region of £9 million dependent on appearances and other factors, on a four-and-a-half-year contract. He was given the number 10 shirt, following the departure of Craig Bellamy to Manchester City, which bore the name "Savio". His English football, Premier League and West Ham debut came on 28 January 2009 in West Ham's 2–0 home win against Hull City. He played an important part in West Ham's win against Manchester City on 1 March 2009 by providing the assist for Jack Collison's 71st-minute goal.

=== Fiorentina and loans ===
He failed to settle at West Ham, making just one start and failing to score in any of his ten appearances. He was sold to Fiorentina for €2.7 million cash, with Manuel da Costa going the other way as part of the deal for free. West Ham retain the rights to 50 percent of the player's sell-on fee.

Nsereko never broke into the first team and in January 2010 was loaned out to Bologna, in what proved to be another disappointing experience, with only two appearances with the Rossoblu. In July 2010, he was sent back to Germany, joining 2. Bundesliga side TSV 1860 Munich on a season loan; the loan agreement was however cancelled unilaterally on 23 October 2010, after the player was reported missing for a week before being found at his sister's place. In January 2011, Nsereko joined Bulgarian A PFG side Chernomorets Burgas on loan until the end of the season. After this loan spell, he was loaned again this time to Serie B side Juve Stabia. After only one game with the club, Savio was reported missing once again in September 2011, leading his club to ask for unilateral rescission of the contract. He was successively reported being in London, and, after returning to Italy with a medical certificate only two weeks later, he was allowed to leave to Germany to deal with unspecified personal problems. In January 2012, Nsereko joined Romanian Liga I side FC Vaslui on loan until 31 December 2012. In July 2012, it was reported in Germany that Nsereko joined 3. Liga side SpVgg Unterhaching on loan for a season.

=== SpVgg Unterhaching ===
After months of speculation, Nsereko finally moved SpVgg Unterhaching of the third division in Germany on 3 September 2012 for free. In an interview on the club's website, Nsereko cited his desire to play in his home town of Munich as one of the motivating factors for his move. He was released by Unterhaching after 2 months with the club. Fiorentina also stated in its financial report ending on 31 December 2012, that Savio was released due to breach of contract on Savio's side. Fiorentina had rights to claim damages for Savio's residual contract which ending on 30 June 2016. It was reported that Savio faked his own kidnapping in Thailand.

=== FC Atyrau ===
On 24 December 2013, Savio signed an 18-month contract with Kazakhstan Premier League side FC Atyrau. On 15 March 2014, he made his Kazakhstan Premier League debut and scored the winning goal for his team in the 1:0 away victory over FC Kairat. In June 2014 after 10 appearances for the club, Savio executed a clause in his contract allowing him to leave Atyrau going on to have a trial with Anzhi Makhachkala at the end of the month. At the end of the 2014 season, Savio's only goal for Atyrau was voted as Goal of the Season by the club's fans.

Savio returned to Kazakhstan in December 2014, joining FC Irtysh Pavlodar on trial, but failed to win a contract, going on trial with Beroe of the Bulgarian A Group in late January 2015, eventually joining the club.

In February 2016, Savio went on trial with Kazakhstan Premier League side FC Shakhter Karagandy, but wasn't offered a contract.

=== Lietava Jonava ===
On 17 March 2016, Lietava announced the signing of Savio. Four months later, 18 July 2016, Savio's contract with Lietava was terminated by mutual consent.

=== Later years ===
In May 2017 it was unveiled Nsereko had been signed by German amateurs FC Pipinsried for the new season. His contract got terminated on 21 July 2017, because they couldn't agree on several terms.

In January 2018, Nsereko went on trial with FC Vereya, signing with the club shortly after. He left the club in April.

In the summer of 2018, Nsereko joined Armin München as a youth coach. During his time at SC Armin, Nsereko made two friendly appearances for the club, as well as training with the first team. On 10 March 2019, Nsereko made his debut for the club, scoring twice in a 5–0 win against Fürstenri II. Nsereko finished the 2018–19 season with seven goals in as many games. Following 14 further goals in 12 games the following season, Nsereko joined BSC Sendling. Nsereko also joined BSC Sendling's second team as manager.

== International career ==
At international level, Nsereko won the 2008 UEFA European Under-19 Football Championship with Germany. He made his U19 debut on 7 September 2007, beating the Netherlands. He has also featured for the Under-20 Germany youth team at 2008–09 and 2009–10 Four Nations Tournaments.

The Ugandan authorities wanted Savio to play for the Uganda national team after a new law allowed dual citizenship for Ugandans.

== Personal life ==
In October 2012, Nsereko was arrested by the police in the Thai resort of Pattaya on a false kidnap claim. He had reportedly attempted to extort €25,000 from his family by telling them he had been kidnapped and demanding a ransom.
