= Filipp Rudik =

Belarusian professional footballer (born 1987)

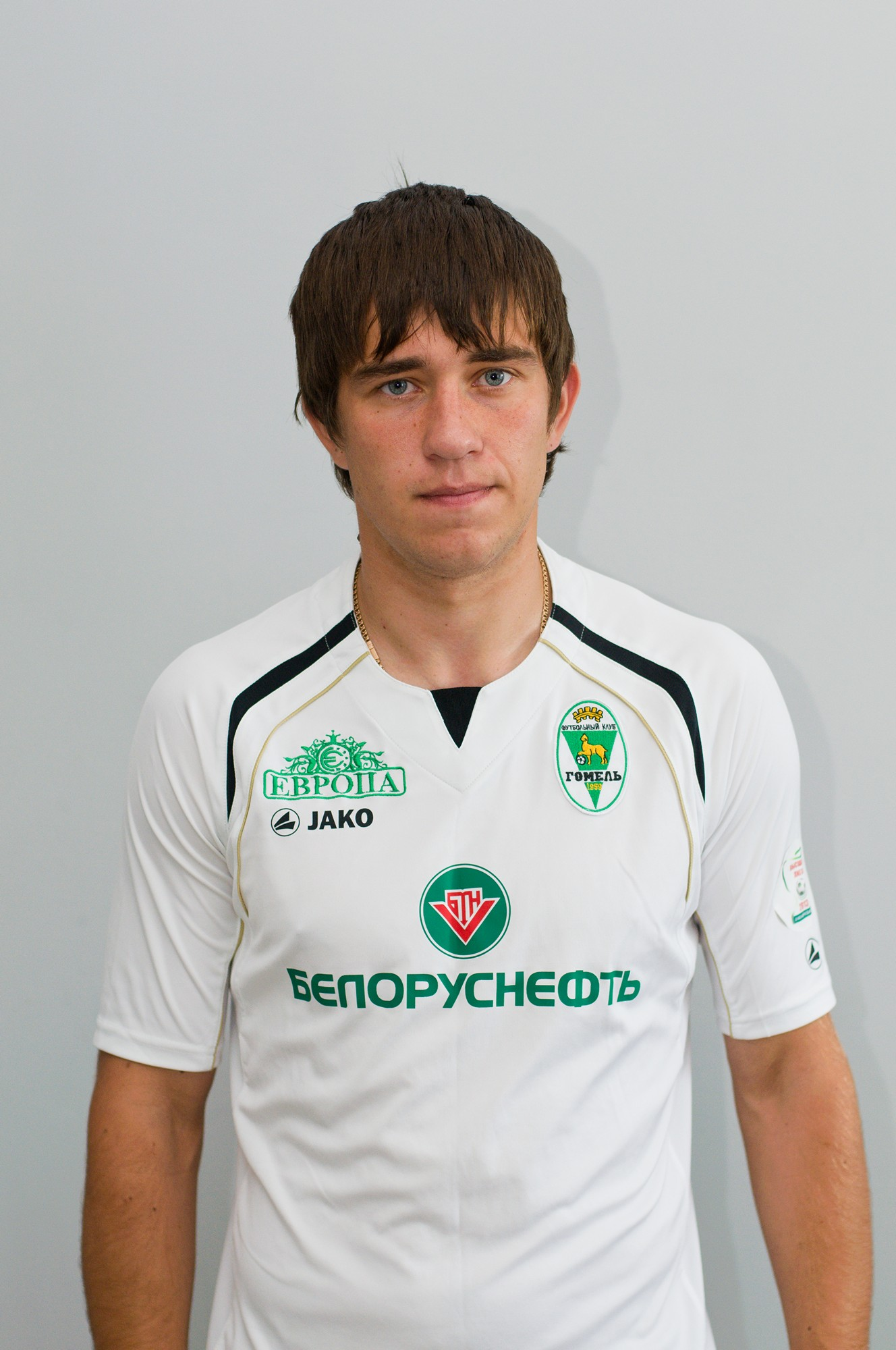

Personal information
- Full name: Filipp Sergeyevich Rudik
- Date of birth: 22 March 1987 (age 39)
- Place of birth: Leningrad, Russian SFSR
- Height: 1.84 m (6 ft 1/2 in)
- Position: Midfielder

Team information
- Current team: DMedia (amateur)

Youth career
- 2005–2006: Naftan Novopolotsk

Senior career*
| Years | Team | Apps | (Gls) |
| 2005–2010 | Naftan Novopolotsk | 100 | (22) |
| 2011–2013 | BATE Borisov | 53 | (6) |
| 2013 | → Gomel (loan) | 13 | (1) |
| 2014 | Atyrau | 12 | (1) |
| 2014 | → Spartak Semey (loan) | 12 | (1) |
| 2015 | Górnik Łęczna | 15 | (1) |
| 2015 | Shakhtyor Soligorsk | 9 | (0) |
| 2016 | Zhetysu | 7 | (0) |
| 2016–2019 | Neman Grodno | 52 | (6) |
| 2019 | Gorodeya | 7 | (0) |
| 2020 | Krumkachy Minsk | 5 | (0) |
| 2021 | Miory | 2 | (0) |
| 2022 | Smorgon | 12 | (4) |
| 2023 | Miory | 12 | (7) |
| 2024– | DMedia (amateur) | | |

International career
| 2008 | Belarus U21 | 4 | (0) |
| 2009–2011 | Belarus | 4 | (0) |
- * Club domestic league appearances and goals as of 31 December 2023

Filipp Sergeyevich Rudik (Belarusian: Філіп Сяргеевіч Рудзік; Russian: Филипп Сергеевич Рудик; born 22 March 1987) is a Belarusian professional footballer who plays as a midfielder for amateur club DMedia.

== Career ==
In June 2014, Rudik left Atyrau, going on to sign with Spartak Semey later in the month.

== Honours ==
Naftan Novopolotsk

- Belarusian Cup: 2008–09

BATE Borisov

- Belarusian Premier League: 2011, 2012, 2013
- Belarusian Super Cup: 2011, 2013
