= Anatoliy Yurevich =

Belarusian football coach (born 1957)

Personal information
- Date of birth: August 12, 1957 (age 69)
- Place of birth: Budenichi, Staryya Darohi Raion, Minsk Oblast, Belarusian SSR

Team information
- Current team: Energetik-BGU Minsk (supervisor coach)

Managerial career
- Years: Team
- 1990–1993: Vedrich Rechitsa
- 1993–1997: MPKC Mozyr
- 1997–2001: Torpedo-MAZ Minsk
- 2002–2003: Lokomotiv Minsk
- 2004: Metalurh Zaporizhzhia
- 2004–2006: Lokomotiv Minsk
- 2007–2008: Gomel
- 2010–2011: Ordabasy
- 2013–2014: Atyrau
- 2017–: Energetik-BGU Minsk (supervisor)

Anatoliy Yurevich (Belarusian: Анатоль Юрэвіч; Russian: Анатолий Юревич; born 12 August 1957) is a Belarusian football coach.

== Career ==
His playing career ended at the age of 17 due to a serious injury. Between 1974 and 1989 he studied to be a professional football coach, while also gaining coaching experience in FShM Minsk, various local Belarusian football academies and Belarusian SSR youth national teams.

In 1990, he joined Vedrich Rechitsa. In 1991, he led the team to winning the Belarusian SSR First League (second tier league). From 1993 till 1997 he managed MPKC Mozyr, whom he led to promotion to the top level in 1995 and winning a double in 1996. He continued working with various Belarusian and former-USSR clubs during 90s, 2000s and 2010s with various degrees of success. From 2010 till 2014 he coached in Kazakhstan, where he managed several clubs and worked in Football Federation of Kazakhstan.

Yurevich has mentored several notable younger Belarusian managers, such as Oleg Kononov and Leonid Kuchuk, who both started their coaching careers as Yurevich's assistants.
