= Sergey Gridin =

Kazakhstani footballer

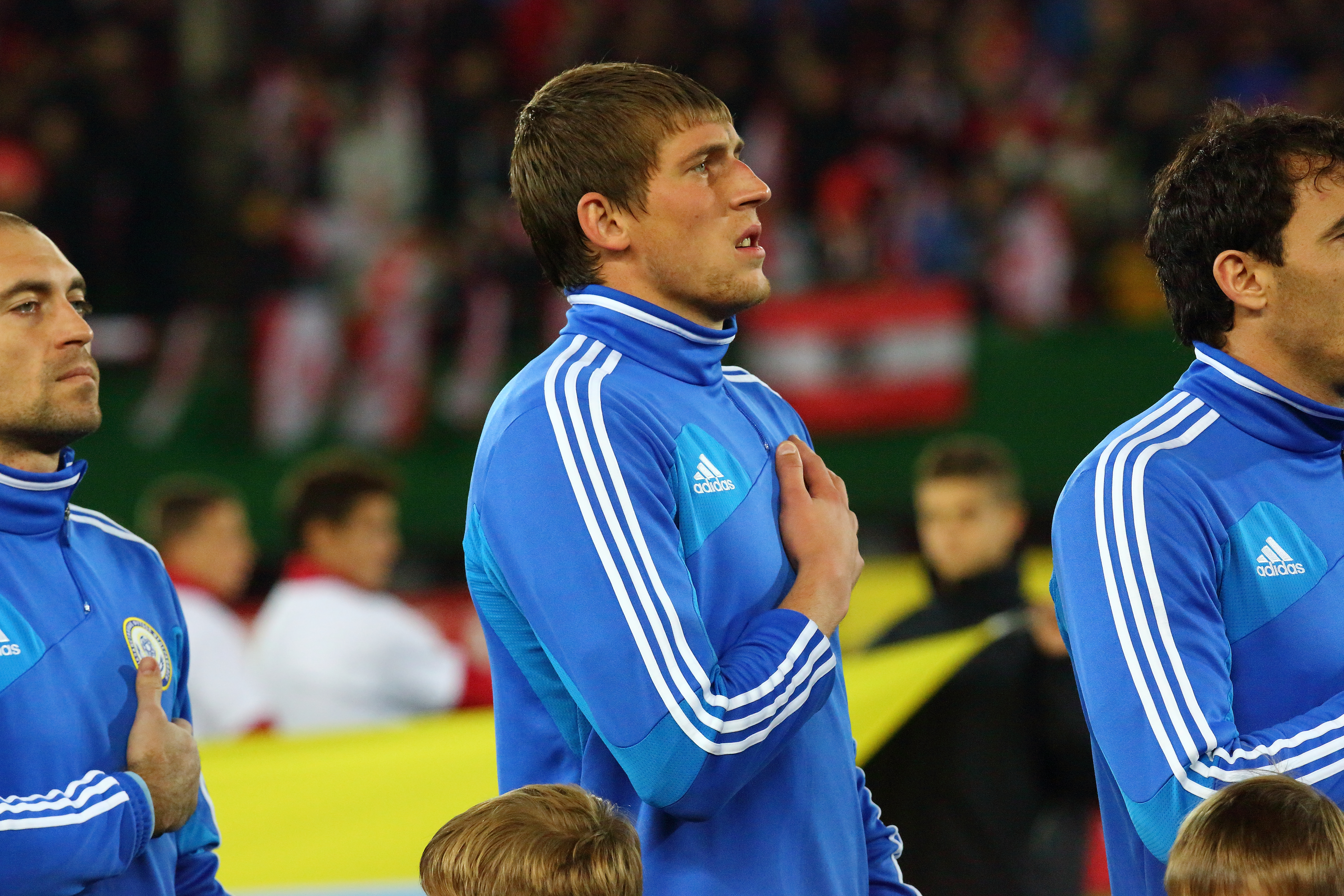

Personal information
- Full name: Sergey Nikolaevich Gridin
- Date of birth: 20 May 1987 (age 39)
- Place of birth: Kazakh SSR; Soviet Union
- Height: 1.94 m (6 ft 4 in)
- Position: Striker

Youth career
- –2004: Tsesna

Senior career*
Years	Team	Apps	(Gls)
2005–2010	Tsesna	?	(22)
2007	→ Caspiy (loan)	22	(13)
2009	→ Zhetysu (loan)	3	(0)
2011	Tobol	30	(12)
2012	Astana	12	(2)
2012	→ Shakhter Karagandy (loan)	10	(0)
2013	Aktobe	24	(3)
2014	Atyrau	6	(1)
2014	Ordabasy	7	(0)
2015	Spartaks Jūrmala	6	(2)
2015	Okzhetpes	13	(2)
2016	Akzhayik	5	(0)
2017	Zhetysu	?	(?)

International career
2011–2013	Kazakhstan	13	(2)
- * Club domestic league appearances and goals as of 25 February 2016

Sergey Gridin (Kazakh: Сергей Гридин; born 20 May 1987) is a Kazakh football player, who most recently played for FC Zhetysu.

== Career ==
=== Club ===
In March 2015, Gridin signed with Latvian Higher League side FK Spartaks Jūrmala. In July 2014, Gridin moved to FC Ordabasy on a six-month contract from FC Atyrau. In February 2016 Gridin signed for newly promoted FC Akzhayik.

=== International ===
Gridin scored twice on his national team debut, a 2–1 victory over Azerbaijan, in a Euro 2012 qualifier on 3 June 2011.

== Career stats ==
=== Club ===
As of 22 September 2014

Club	Season	Country	League		Cup		Europe		Total	
Club	Season	Country	Apps	Goals	Apps	Goals	Apps	Goals	Apps	Goals
Tsesna	2005	Kazakhstan	?	2	?	0	-	-	?	2
Tsesna	2006	Kazakhstan	?	6	?	0	-	-	?	6
Caspiy	2007	Kazakhstan	?	13	?	0	-	-	?	13
Almaty	2008	Kazakhstan	22	1	7	2	-	-	29	3
Zhetysu	2009	Kazakhstan	3	0	2	0	-	-	5	0
Tsesna	2010	Kazakhstan	30	14	3	3	-	-	33	17
Tobol	2011	Kazakhstan	30	12	6	4	2	0	38	16
Astana	2012	Kazakhstan	12	2	3	1	-	-	14	2
Shakhter	2012	Kazakhstan	10	0	3	0	2	0	15	0
Aktobe	2013	Kazakhstan	24	3	2	1	5	0	31	4
Atyrau	2014	Kazakhstan	6	1	0	0	-		6	1
Ordabasy	2014	Kazakhstan	4	0	0	0	-		4	0
Career Total			141	54	30	11	9	0	175	65

== International goals ==
#	Date	Venue	Opponent	Score	Result	Competition
1	3 June 2011	Astana Arena, Kazakhstan	Azerbaijan	1 – 0	2–1	Euro 2012 qualification
2	3 June 2011	Astana Arena, Kazakhstan	Azerbaijan	2 – 1	2–1	Euro 2012 qualification

== Honours ==
- Kazakhstan Cup Runner-up: 2 (2008, 2011)
