= Yevgeni Ovshinov =

Russian-Kazakhstani footballer

Personal information
- Full name: Yevgeni Valeryevich Ovshinov
- Date of birth: 17 October 1980 (age 46)
- Place of birth: Stavropol, Russia
- Height: 1.78 m (5 ft 10 in)
- Positions: Defender; striker

Senior career*
Years	Team	Apps	(Gls)
1997–2001	Uralan Elista	3	(0)
2001	Kavkazkabel Prokhladny	15	(0)
2002–2004	Uralan Elista	45	(0)
2005–2007	Irtysh	77	(1)
2008	Zhetysu	24	(0)
2009	Kaisar	25	(1)
2010	Kairat	25	(0)
2011	Tobol	28	(0)
2012–2013	Atyrau	28	(1)
2014–2015	Spartak Semey	24	(0)

International career
2000–2001	Kazakhstan U21	8	(1)
- * Club domestic league appearances and goals

Yevgeni Valeryevich Ovshinov (Russian: Евгений Валерьевич Овшинов; born 17 October 1980) is a Kazakhstani-Russian former professional footballer.
