= Denis Rodionov =

Kazakhstani footballer

Personal information
- Full name: Denis Rodionov
- Date of birth: 26 July 1985 (age 41)
- Place of birth: Soviet Union
- Height: 1.78 m (5 ft 10 in)
- Position: Midfielder

Team information
- Current team: Zhetysu
- Number: 6

Senior career*
Years	Team	Apps	(Gls)
2002	Atyrau	5	(0)
2003	Munayil Atyrau	4	(2)
2003–2006	Atyrau	88	(11)
2007–2008	Almaty	29	(2)
2009–2010	Zhetysu	18	(1)
2010	Aktobe		
2011–2013	Atyrau	53	(4)
2014–	Zhetysu	19	(1)

International career
2004–	Kazakhstan	13	(1)
- * Club domestic league appearances and goals as of 21 July 2015

Denis Rodionov (Kazakh: Денис Родионов; born 26 July 1985) is a Kazakh football midfielder who plays for the club Zhetysu.

Rodionov had made 11 appearances for the Kazakhstan national football team.
