= Nikola Milanković =

Serbian footballer (born 1986)

Personal information
- Full name: Nikola Milanković
- Date of birth: 24 April 1986 (age 40)
- Place of birth: Split, SFR Yugoslavia
- Height: 1.83 m (6 ft 0 in)
- Position: Central midfielder

Senior career*
Years	Team	Apps	(Gls)
2004–2007	Proleter Novi Sad		
2008	Zlatibor Voda Horgoš	12	(1)
2008–2011	Spartak Subotica	83	(3)
2012–2013	Atyrau	48	(2)
2014	Napredak Kruševac	8	(0)
2014–2017	Borussia Fulda	84	(6)
- * Club domestic league appearances and goals

Nikola Milanković (Serbian Cyrillic: Никола Миланковић; born 24 April 1986) is a Serbian retired football midfielder.

== Career ==
He started his career in Proleter Novi Sad. After 4 seasons, he moved in Zlatibor Voda Horgoš and then to Spartak Subotica, where he affirmed as a footballer. Later, he left to Kazakhstan, and stayed there for two seasons.

In 2014, he returned in Serbia, and signed with Napredak Kruševac.

At the end of the 2013/14 season Milankovic joined Borussia Fulda.
