= Anton Tsirin =

Kazakh international footballer (born 1987)

Personal information
- Date of birth: 10 August 1987 (age 39)
- Place of birth: Uzbek SSR
- Height: 1.96 m (6 ft 5 in)
- Position: Goalkeeper

Senior career*
Years	Team	Apps	(Gls)
2008–2012	Irtysh Pavlodar	25	(0)
2012	Akzhayik	23	(0)
2013	Zhetysu	11	(0)
2014	Atyrau	3	(0)
2015	Okzhetpes	21	(0)
2016	Irtysh Pavlodar	8	(0)
2017	Kaisar	0	(0)
2017	Irtysh Pavlodar	0	(0)
2018	Kyzylzhar	20	(0)
2019	Irtysh Pavlodar	12	(0)
2019–2020	Kyzylzhar	0	(0)

International career
2011–2012	Kazakhstan	2	(0)
- * Club domestic league appearances and goals

Anton Tsirin (born 10 August 1987) is a Kazakh former international footballer who played as a goalkeeper.

== Early and personal life ==
Tsirin was born in the Uzbek SSR, but moved to Pavlodar in Kazakhstan at the age of five.

== Club career ==
In January 2012, Tsirin moved to FC Akzhayik before signing with FC Zhetysu in January 2013, and FC Atyrau at the start of the 2014 season. On 24 November 2014, Tsirin moved back to Irtysh.

== International career ==
Tsirin made his international debut for Kazakhstan in 2011.
