= Pavel Plaskonny =

Belarusian footballer (born 1985)

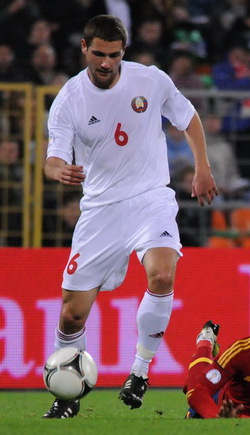
- Plaskonny in 2012

Personal information
- Full name: Pavel Sergeevich Plaskonny
- Date of birth: 29 January 1985 (age 41)
- Place of birth: Minsk, Soviet Union
- Height: 1.85 m (6 ft 1 in)
- Position: Defender

Youth career
- 2002–2004: Lokomotiv Moscow

Senior career*
| Years | Team | Apps | (Gls) |
| 2005–2007 | Shakhtyor Soligorsk | 67 | (5) |
| 2008 | Panionios | 4 | (0) |
| 2009–2010 | Shakhtyor Soligorsk | 23 | (0) |
| 2010–2011 | Neman Grodno | 36 | (0) |
| 2012–2013 | Dinamo Minsk | 43 | (2) |
| 2014 | Atyrau | 23 | (0) |
| 2015 | Vitebsk | 6 | (0) |
| 2015 | Belshina Bobruisk | 10 | (0) |
| 2016–2018 | Gorodeya | 66 | (1) |
| 2019 | NFK Minsk | 6 | (0) |

International career
| –2004 | Belarus U19 | | |
| 2004–2006 | Belarus U21 | 14 | (0) |
| 2006–2012 | Belarus | 16 | (1) |

Managerial career
- 2020–2022: Shakhtyor Soligorsk (academy)
- 2023–: Minsk (assistant)
- * Club domestic league appearances and goals

Pavel Syarheyevich Plaskonny (Belarusian: Павел Пласконны; Russian: Павел Серге́евич Пласконный; born 29 January 1985) is a Belarusian retired professional footballer who played as a defender.

== Club career ==
In July 2010, Plaskonny signed with Neman Grodno. In early December 2011, he moved to Dinamo Minsk, putting pen to paper on a three-year contract.

34-year-old Plaskonny announced his retirement in September 2019.

== International career ==
Plaskonny has appeared 16 times for the senior Belarus national team, his first call-up came in November 2005.

== Career statistics ==
| # | Date | Venue | Opponent | Score | Result | Competition |
|---|---|---|---|---|---|---|
| 1 | 2 February 2008 | Ta' Qali National Stadium, Attard, Malta | Iceland | 2 – 0 | 2–0 | Malta International Football Tournament |

== Honours ==
Shakhtyor Soligorsk

- Belarusian Premier League: 2005
