= Marko Blažić =

Serbian footballer

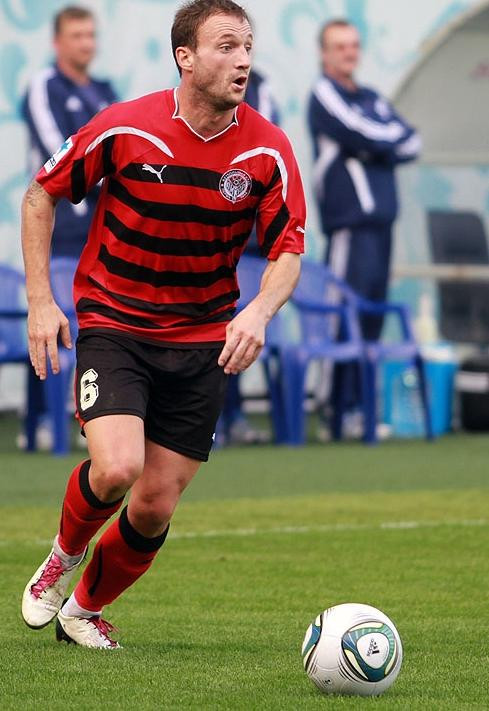
- Blažić with Amkar Perm in 2011

Personal information
- Date of birth: 2 August 1985 (age 41)
- Place of birth: Mladenovac, SFR Yugoslavia
- Height: 1.78 m (5 ft 10 in)
- Position: Midfielder

Team information
- Current team: Mladenovac

Youth career
- Red Star Belgrade

Senior career*
Years	Team	Apps	(Gls)
2002–2003	Mladenovac	22	(1)
2003–2004	Polet Mirosaljci	29	(7)
2004	Radnički Beograd	5	(0)
2005	Mladenovac	33	(6)
2006–2007	Čukarički	68	(11)
2008–2010	Red Star Belgrade	35	(4)
2011	Ružomberok	11	(3)
2011–2012	Amkar Perm	26	(1)
2013	Bunyodkor	20	(3)
2014	Atyrau	30	(1)
2015–2016	Radnički Niš	19	(0)
2016	AEL Kalloni	9	(0)
2016–2019	Lamia	75	(3)
2019–2020	Apollon Smyrnis	19	(2)
2020–2022	Rad	55	(1)
2022–2023	IMT	19	(0)
2023–2024	FK Ušće Novi Beograd		
2024–	Mladenovac		
- * Club domestic league appearances and goals as of 25 June 2023

Marko Blažić (Serbian Cyrillic: Марко Блажић; born 2 August 1985) is a Serbian professional footballer who plays as a midfielder for Mladenovac.

== Career ==
Blažić started out with his local club Mladenovac. He made a name for himself at Čukarički, before transferring to Red Star Belgrade in the winter of 2008, together with Pavle Ninkov. Blažić spent the following three years with the Red-Whites, before moving abroad to Slovak side Ružomberok in the winter of 2011. He subsequently played for Russian club Amkar Perm (2011–2012), as well as for Uzbekistani club Bunyodkor (2013), and Kazakhstani club Atyrau (2014).

In July 2015, Blažić returned to his homeland by signing a one-year deal with Radnički Niš.

== Honours ==
Red Star Belgrade

- Serbian Cup: 2009–10

Bunyodkor

- Uzbek League: 2013
- Uzbekistan Cup: 2013
