= Guy Stéphane Essame =

Cameroonian footballer (born 1984)

Guy Essame
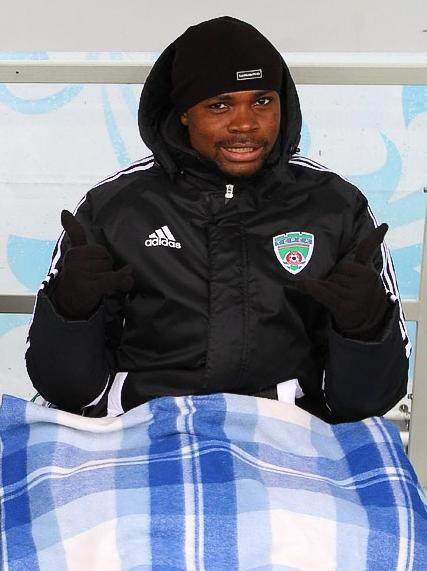
- Essame with Terek in 2011

Personal information
- Full name: Guy Stéphane Essame
- Date of birth: 25 November 1984 (age 41)
- Place of birth: Douala, Cameroon
- Height: 1.78 m (5 ft 10 in)
- Position: Midfielder

Youth career
- SC Union Brasseries du Cameroun

Senior career*
| Years | Team | Apps | (Gls) |
| 2004–2005 | Sportivo Luqueño | 13 | (0) |
| 2005–2007 | Boavista | 22 | (1) |
| 2008–2012 | Terek Grozny | 64 | (0) |
| 2009 | → Nizhny Novgorod (loan) | 16 | (0) |
| 2013 | Neman Grodno | 14 | (2) |
| 2013–2016 | Atyrau | 77 | (7) |
| 2014 | → Astana (loan) | 11 | (0) |

International career
| 2008–2009 | Cameroon | 3 | (0) |
- * Club domestic league appearances and goals

Guy Stéphane Essame (born 25 November 1984) is a Cameroonian former footballer who played as a midfielder.

== Career ==
=== Club ===
In 2008, he signed for the Chechen club Terek Grozny, before he played in Boavista where he has played since 2005, playing 22 matches but has yet to score a goal. On 27 July 2009 FC Nizhny Novgorod have signed the Cameroonian midfielder on loan from Terek Grozny.

==== Atyrau ====
In December 2013, Essame signed for Kazakhstan Premier League side FC Atyrau. On the last day of the 2014 Kazakhstan Premier League transfer window, 9 July 2014, Essame moved on loan to FC Astana, with Marat Shakhmetov going the opposite way, till the end of the season.

At the end of the 2016 season, Essame signed a new one-year contract with Atyrau. However the contract never reached the Kazakhstan Premier League, with the Director of Atyrau cancelling the contract in January 2017, after Essame had taken part in the club's first pre-season training camp.

=== International ===
After a long spell in the Brasseries football academy, also responsible for forming the likes of Rigobert Song and Geremi Njitap, he captained the U17 Cameroon's national team to two continental competitions. A brief stop in Paraguay was then followed by a departure for Portugal, in Boavista. He made his first cap for Cameroon national football team in the 2010 WCQ match against Mauritius on 11 October 2008.

== Career statistics ==
=== Club ===
As of match played 29 October 2016

Appearances and goals by club, season and competition
| Club | Season | League | | | National Cup | | Continental | | Other | | Total | |
| Club | Season | Division | Apps | Goals | Apps | Goals | Apps | Goals | Apps | Goals | Apps | Goals |
|---|---|---|---|---|---|---|---|---|---|---|---|---|
| Boavista | 2005–06 | Primeira Liga | 3 | 0 | | | - | | - | | 3 | 0 |
| Boavista | 2006–07 | Primeira Liga | 18 | 0 | | | - | | - | | 18 | 0 |
| Boavista | 2007–08 | Primeira Liga | 1 | 0 | | | - | | - | | 1 | 0 |
| Boavista | Total | | 22 | 0 | | | - | - | - | - | 22 | 0 |
| Terek Grozny | 2008 | Russian Premier League | 20 | 0 | 1 | 0 | - | | - | | 21 | 0 |
| Terek Grozny | 2009 | Russian Premier League | 6 | 0 | 0 | 0 | - | | - | | 6 | 0 |
| Terek Grozny | 2010 | Russian Premier League | 21 | 0 | 0 | 0 | - | | - | | 21 | 0 |
| Terek Grozny | 2011–12 | Russian Premier League | 17 | 0 | 0 | 0 | - | | - | | 17 | 0 |
| Terek Grozny | Total | | 64 | 0 | 1 | 0 | - | - | - | - | 65 | 0 |
| Nizhny Novgorod (loan) | 2009 | Russian National League | 15 | 0 | 1 | 0 | – | | – | | 16 | 0 |
| Neman Grodno | 2013 | Belarusian Premier League | 14 | 2 | 2 | 0 | – | | – | | 16 | 2 |
| Atyrau | 2014 | Kazakhstan Premier League | 18 | 2 | 3 | 1 | - | | - | | 21 | 3 |
| Atyrau | 2015 | Kazakhstan Premier League | 31 | 4 | 1 | 0 | - | | - | | 32 | 4 |
| Atyrau | 2016 | Kazakhstan Premier League | 28 | 1 | 3 | 0 | - | | - | | 31 | 1 |
| Atyrau | Total | | 77 | 7 | 7 | 1 | - | - | - | - | 84 | 8 |
| Astana (loan) | 2014 | Kazakhstan Premier League | 11 | 0 | 1 | 0 | 6 | 0 | – | | 18 | 0 |
| Career total | | | 203 | 9 | 12 | 1 | 6 | 0 | - | - | 221 | 10 |

=== International ===
Cameroon national team
| Year | Apps | Goals |
|---|---|---|
| 2008 | 2 | 0 |
| 2009 | 1 | 0 |
| Total | 3 | 0 |

Statistics accurate as of match played 11 February 2009

== Honours ==
Astana

- Kazakhstan Premier League (1): 2014

== Other activities ==
In 2009, Guy Stephane Essame founded FC Lotus-Terek Yaoundé in Cameroon coached by Thomas Libiih. In September 2010, it became a farm team of FC Terek Grozny.
