= Mikhail Afanasyev =

Belarusian footballer

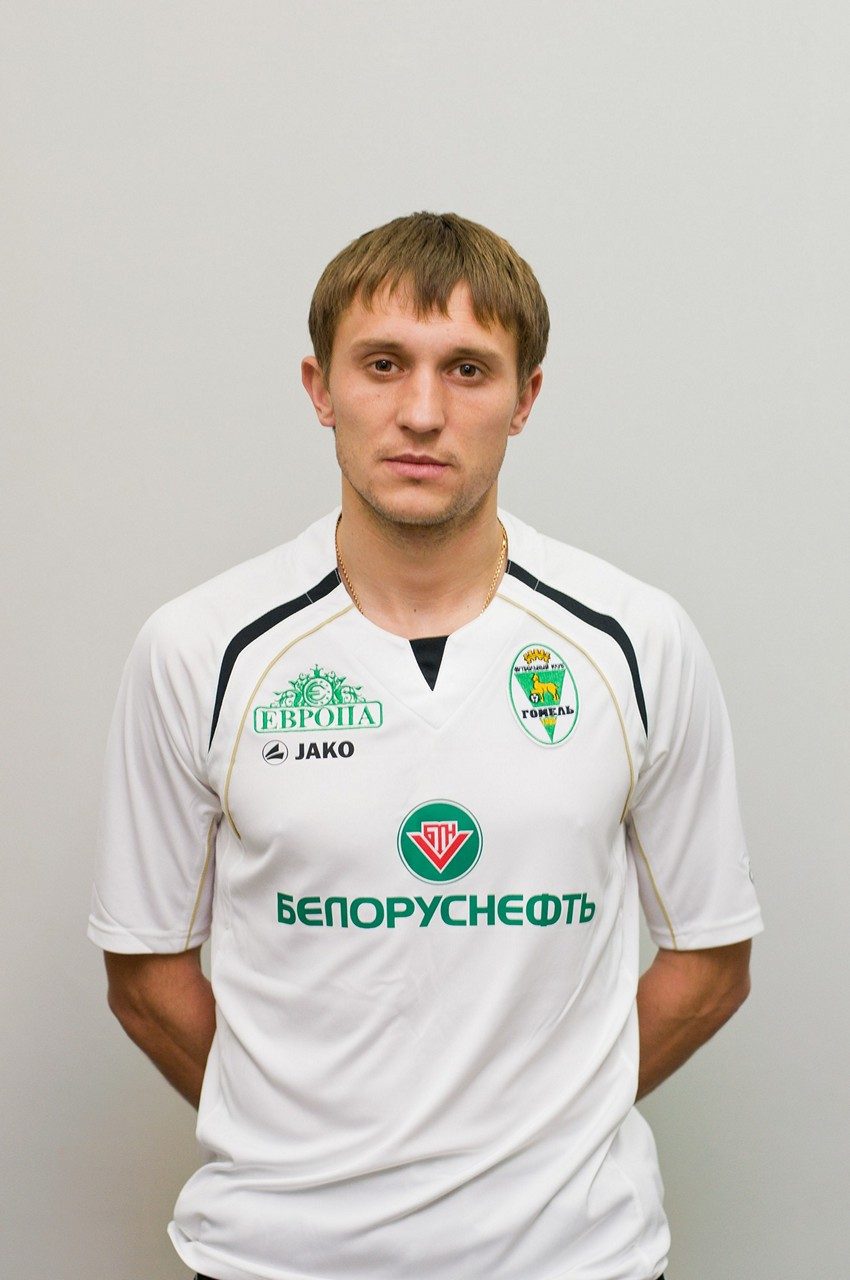
- Mikhail Afanasyev (2013)

Personal information
- Date of birth: 4 November 1986 (age 40)
- Place of birth: Minsk, Belarusian SSR, Soviet Union
- Height: 1.74 m (5 ft 8 1/2 in)
- Position: Midfielder

Youth career
- 2000–2001: Smena Minsk

Senior career*
Years	Team	Apps	(Gls)
2001	Smena Minsk	6	(0)
2002–2004	BATE Borisov	23	(5)
2005–2007	MTZ-RIPO Minsk	70	(9)
2008–2009	Amkar Perm	19	(2)
2010	Kuban Krasnodar	7	(0)
2010	Salyut Belgorod	19	(0)
2011–2012	Dinamo Minsk	53	(6)
2013	Gomel	29	(3)
2014	Atyrau	27	(0)
2015	Shakhtyor Soligorsk	17	(2)
2016	Belshina Bobruisk	9	(2)
2016–2017	Torpedo-BelAZ Zhodino	38	(5)
2018–2019	Fakel Voronezh	44	(5)
2019	Isloch Minsk Raion	10	(0)
2020–2021	Torpedo-BelAZ Zhodino	35	(1)

International career^{‡}
2004–2009	Belarus U21	47	(11)
2009	Belarus B	1	(0)
- * Club domestic league appearances and goals as of 31 December 2021 ‡ National team caps and goals as of 5 September 2010

Mikhail Afanasyev (Belarusian: Міхаіл Афанасьеў, Russian: Михаил Афанасьев; born 4 November 1986) is a Belarusian former professional footballer.

== Club career ==
He was signed by FC Amkar Perm in February 2008. Afanasyev joined Torpedo-BelAZ Zhodino in January 2020.

== International career ==
Afanasyev was the captain of the Belarus U21 team and participated in all three of the Belarusians' games at the 2009 UEFA European Under-21 Football Championship. He conceded a handball in the game against Italy U21, resulting in a penalty, which contributed to the 1–2 loss. Afanasyev holds the record for the most matches played and is also the highest goal scorer for the U-21 side. On 13 November 2009, he made his international debut for the Belarus B team, against Saudi Arabia B team in a friendly match.

== Honours ==
MTZ-RIPO Minsk

- Belarusian Cup winner: 2005
