= Andrey Karpovich =

Kazakhstani footballer

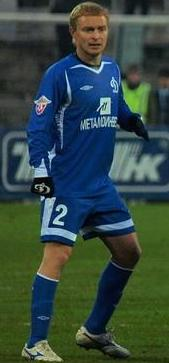

Personal information
- Full name: Andrey Vladimirovich Karpovich
- Date of birth: 18 January 1981 (age 45)
- Place of birth: Semipalatinsk, Kazakh SSR, Soviet Union
- Height: 1.77 m (5 ft 10 in)
- Position: Defensive midfielder

Team information
- Current team: Yelimay (manager)

Senior career*
Years	Team	Apps	(Gls)
1998–2000	Elimay	54	(6)
2001	Irtysh	24	(0)
2002–2003	Rostov	42	(1)
2004–2006	Kairat	68	(3)
2007–2008	Dynamo Moscow	23	(0)
2009	Lokomotiv Astana	23	(2)
2010	Aktobe	30	(2)
2011	Astana	9	(0)
2012–2013	Ordabasy	50	(3)
2014	Atyrau	25	(2)
2015	Shakhter Karagandy	21	(3)
2016	Altai Semey	26	(3)

International career
2001–2014	Kazakhstan	55	(3)

Managerial career
- 2018: Kairat (Caretaker)
- 2019–2020: Okzhetpes
- 2021–2022: Kyzylzhar
- 2022: Kazakhstan (Caretaker)
- 2022–2023: Aktobe
- 2023–: Yelimay
- * Club domestic league appearances and goals

Andrey Vladimirovich Karpovich (Russian: Андрей Владимирович Карпович; born 18 January 1981) is a Kazakh football manager and a former player who is the manager of Yelimay.

== Career ==
=== Club ===
Karpovich started his career in his home town Semey playing for FC Elimay, and has since played for a number of different teams, finally signing for Russian side FC Dinamo Moskva in 2007. In February 2009, he transferred to the Kazakh team FC Lokomotiv Astana.

=== International ===
Karpovich scored Kazakhstan's first-ever goal in a competitive match after entering UEFA. The game was against Ukraine in a 2006 FIFA World Cup qualification opener. He has made 49 international appearances for the Kazakhstan national team.

=== Managerial ===
On 15 October 2018, Karpovich was appointed as caretaker manager of FC Kairat after Carlos Alós left by mutual consent.

On 3 January 2019, Karpovich was announced as FC Okzhetpes manager for the 2019 Kazakhstan Premier League season.

== Career statistics ==
=== International goals ===
#	Date	Venue	Opponent	Score	Result	Competition
1.	28 April 2004	Central Stadium, Almaty, Kazakhstan	Azerbaijan	2–3	Loss	Friendly
2.	8 September 2004	Central Stadium, Almaty, Kazakhstan	Ukraine	1–2	Loss	2006 World Cup qualification
3.	11 August 2010	Astana Arena, Astana, Kazakhstan	Oman	3–1	Win	Friendly
Correct as of 13 January 2017
