= Marat Butuyev =

Russian professional football player

Personal information
- Full name: Marat Stanislavovich Butuyev
- Date of birth: 8 May 1992 (age 34)
- Height: 1.83 m (6 ft 0 in)
- Position: Defender

Senior career*
Years	Team	Apps	(Gls)
2010–2012	FC FAYUR Beslan	52	(1)
2012	FC Spartak Vladikavkaz	0	(0)
2013	FC Alania-d Vladikavkaz	14	(0)
2013	FC Spartak Vladikavkaz	5	(0)
2014	FC Atyrau	31	(0)
2015	FC Spartak Vladikavkaz	17	(0)
2016	FC Tskhinvali	3	(0)
2016	Alashkert FC	2	(0)
2017	FC Kolomna	8	(0)
2017–2018	FC Kubanskaya Korona Shevchenko		
2018	FC Kolos Beloglinsky District		
2019	FC Kuban-Holding Pavlovskaya (amateur)		
2020	FC Kuban-Holding Pavlovskaya	1	(0)
- * Club domestic league appearances and goals

Marat Stanislavovich Butuyev (Russian: Марат Станиславович Бутуев; born 8 May 1992) is a Russian former professional football player.

== Club career ==
He played for FC Alania Vladikavkaz in the 2012–13 Russian Cup game against FC Tyumen on 27 September 2012.

He made his Russian Football National League debut for Alania on 12 August 2013 in a game against FC Salyut Belgorod.
