= Michael Odibe =

Nigerian footballer

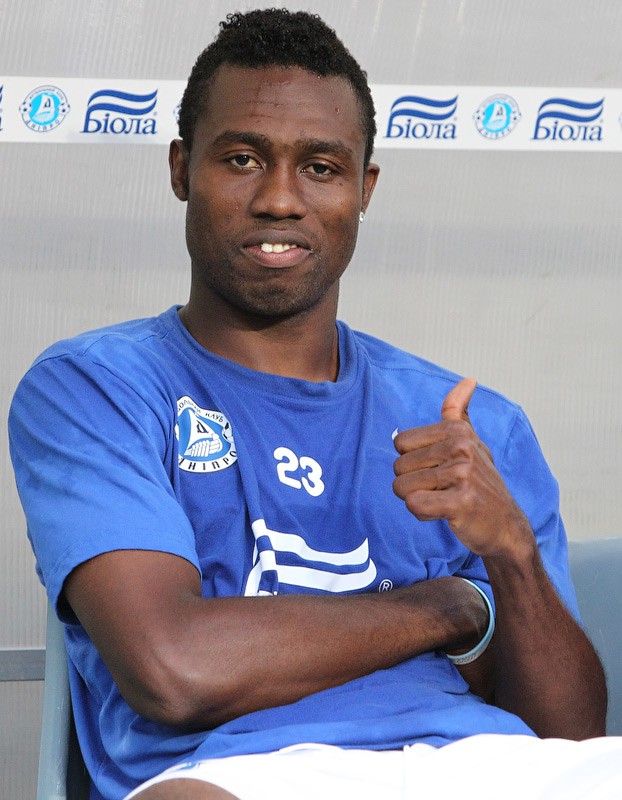

Personal information
- Full name: Michael Chukwuwike Odibe
- Date of birth: July 23, 1988 (age 38)
- Place of birth: Lagos, Nigeria
- Height: 1.91 m (6 ft 3 in)
- Position: Defender

Youth career
- 2005–2006: First Bank

Senior career*
Years	Team	Apps	(Gls)
2007–2008	First Bank	24	(1)
2008–2010	Union SG	11	(0)
2010–2012	Siena	5	(0)
2011	→ Südtirol (loan)	11	(1)
2011–2013	Arsenal Kyiv	26	(4)
2012	→ Dnipro Dnipropetrovsk (loan)	9	(1)
2014–2015	Atyrau	47	(2)
2016	Concordia Chiajna	14	(3)
2016–2018	Akzhayik	42	(1)
2018–2019	Mağusa Türk Gücü		
2019	Al-Minaa	0	(0)
2020–	Concordia Chiajna	0	(0)

International career^{‡}
2011	Nigeria	1	(0)
- * Club domestic league appearances and goals as of 14 March 2020 ‡ National team caps and goals as of 12 February 2011

Michael Chukwuwike Odibe (born July 23, 1988) is a Nigerian footballer who plays as a defender.

== Career ==
=== Siena ===
On 1 February 2010, Siena signed the defender on loan from the Belgian club Saint-Gilles.

=== Südtirol(loan) ===
On 31 January 2011 left AC Siena and joined on loan for six months to Südtirol.

=== Arsenal Kyiv(loan) ===
On 31 August 2011, Odibe joined the Ukrainian Premier League outfit Arsenal Kyiv on a season-long loan deal.

=== Atyrau ===
In January 2014, Odibe joined Atyrau in the Kazakhstan Premier League following the cancellation of his Arsenal Kyiv contract when they dissolved.

== International career ==
Odibe was called for the Super Eagles for the friendly game against Sierra Leone national football team in his hometown Lagos on 9 February 2011.

== Honours ==
=== Club ===
Mağusa Türk Gücü

- KTFF Süper Lig: 2018–19
