= Jovan Golić =

Serbian footballer (born 1986)

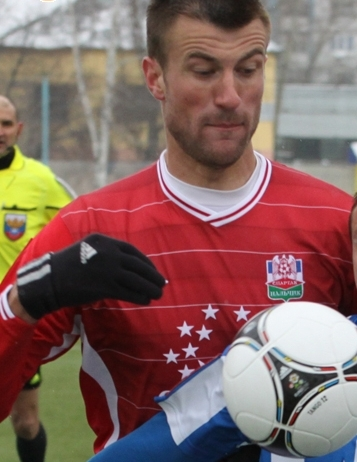
- Jovan Golić (2012)

Personal information
- Date of birth: 18 September 1986 (age 40)
- Place of birth: Vlasenica, Bosnia and Herzegovina, Yugoslavia
- Height: 1.93 m (6 ft 4 in)
- Position: Midfielder

Team information
- Current team: Smederevo (manager)

Youth career
- 1992–2001: Boksit Milići
- 2001–2002: Proleter Zrenjanin

Senior career*
Years	Team	Apps	(Gls)
2002–2004	Mladost Lukićevo	16	(0)
2004–2006	Bačka	39	(8)
2006–2011	Inđija	89	(17)
2010	→ Spartak Nalchik (loan)	15	(2)
2011–2012	Spartak Nalchik	12	(2)
2012	Turnu Severin	13	(0)
2013	Atyrau	18	(1)
2013–2016	Taraz	46	(3)
Total		248	(33)

Managerial career
- 2019–2020: Inđija (assistant)
- 2020: Caspiy (assistant)
- 2020–2021: Omladinac Novi Banovci
- 2021–2023: Inđija (assistant)
- 2023–2024: Inđija
- 2024–: Smederevo
- * Club domestic league appearances and goals

Jovan Golić (Serbian Cyrillic: Јован Голић; born 18 September 1986) is a Serbian football coach and former player. He is the manager of Smederevo.

== Career ==
Born in Vlasenica, SR Bosnia and Herzegovina, Golić joined the youth team of FK Boksit Milići in 1992 and played there till 2001 when he moved to Serbia and joined the youth team of FK Proleter Zrenjanin. After one season with Proleter, he joined FK Mladost Lukićevo playing in Serbian League (third tier) where he debuted as senior in the 2002–03 season. In summer 2005 he moved to FK Bačka from Bačka Palanka, and after a year and a half he moved to FK Inđija playing with them till summer 2010 when they achieved promotion to the Serbian SuperLiga. However Golić that summer capitalised this highlight and instead of getting a chance to play with the club in Serbian highest level, he accepted a lucrative offer from Russian Premier League side PFC Spartak Nalchik where he had already played half-season on loan from Inđija. He played two season in Russian top-flight with Nalchik and next he moved to Romania signing with CS Turnu Severin.

In December 2013, Golić was in Kazakhstan top league and he moved from FC Atyrau to FC Taraz.
