= Dmitri Parkhachev =

Belarusian footballer

Personal information
- Date of birth: 2 January 1985 (age 41)
- Place of birth: Kobrin, Brest Oblast, Belarusian SSR
- Height: 1.81 m (5 ft 11 in)
- Position: Midfielder

Youth career
- 2000–2002: RUOR Minsk

Senior career*
| Years | Team | Apps | (Gls) |
| 2000–2002 | RUOR Minsk | 30 | (3) |
| 2003–2006 | Dinamo Minsk | 26 | (7) |
| 2004 | → Dnepr-Transmash Mogilev (loan) | 5 | (0) |
| 2006–2007 | Dinamo Brest | 6 | (0) |
| 2007–2008 | Olimpik Baku | 25 | (0) |
| 2008 | Vostok | 9 | (4) |
| 2009 | Ordabasy | 25 | (9) |
| 2010 | Tobol | 12 | (1) |
| 2010–2011 | Zhetysu | 12 | (0) |
| 2011–2012 | Kapaz | 26 | (3) |
| 2012 | Kaisar | 13 | (1) |
| 2013 | Slavia Mozyr | 10 | (1) |
| 2013 | Kaisar | 20 | (3) |
| 2014–2015 | Atyrau | 42 | (2) |
| 2016–2018 | Gorodeya | 52 | (6) |
| 2018–2019 | NFK Minsk | 21 | (4) |
- * Club domestic league appearances and goals as of 31 May 2019

Dmitri Parkhachev (Russian: Дмитрий Пархачев; born 2 January 1985) is a Belarusian former footballer.

== Career ==
Parkhachev began his career playing for Belarusian Premier League sides Dnepr-Transmash Mogilev, Dinamo Minsk and Dinamo Brest. In the summer of 2007, he joined Azerbaijani club Olimpik Baku. The following summer he moved to Kazakhstan, where he would play for Vostok, Ordabasy and Tobol in successive seasons.

Parkhachev joined Zhetysu in July 2010.

== Honours ==
Dinamo Minsk

- Belarusian Premier League champion: 2004

Dinamo Brest

- Belarusian Cup winner: 2006–07

Tobol

- Kazakhstan Premier League champion: 2010
