= 2014 FC Taraz season =

FC Taraz
2014 season
- Manager: Arno Pijpers
- Stadium: Central Stadium
- Kazakhstan Premier League: 11th
- Kazakhstan Cup: Quarter-final vs Aktobe
- Top goalscorer: League: Two Players (7); All: Murat Tleshev (9)
| Home colours | Away colours |

The 2014 FC Taraz season was the sixth successive season that the club playing in the Kazakhstan Premier League, the highest tier of association football in Kazakhstan. Taraz finished the season in 11th position, beating FC Kyran on penalties in a relegation play-off whilst also reaching the quarter-finals of the Kazakhstan Cup, where they lost to Aktobe.

== Squad ==
As of 19 September 2014

Note: Flags indicate national team as defined under FIFA eligibility rules; some limited exceptions apply. Players may hold more than one non-FIFA nationality.

| No. | Pos. | Nation | Player |
|---|---|---|---|
| 1 | GK | KAZ | Ramil Nurmukhametov |
| 2 | DF | SUR | Sigourney Bandjar |
| 3 | DF | KAZ | Aleksandr Kuchma |
| 4 | DF | KAZ | Ilya Vorotnikov |
| 5 | DF | KAZ | Sergei Skorykh |
| 6 | MF | KAZ | Dmitri Yevstigneyev |
| 7 | MF | KAZ | Eduard Sergienko |
| 8 | MF | KAZ | Vitali Yevstigneyev |
| 9 | FW | KAZ | Murat Tleshev |
| 11 | MF | KAZ | Timur Dosmagambetov |
| 12 | FW | KAZ | Aleksey Shchetkin |
| 14 | DF | KAZ | Berik Aitbayev |

| No. | Pos. | Nation | Player |
|---|---|---|---|
| 15 | DF | SLO | Rok Roj |
| 17 | MF | KAZ | Oleg Nedashkovsky |
| 18 | MF | SRB | Jovan Golić |
| 20 | MF | NED | Desley Ubbink |
| 21 | DF | KAZ | Daniyar Bayaliev |
| 22 | MF | KAZ | Maksat Amirkhanov |
| 23 | MF | KAZ | Zhakyp Kozhamberdi |
| 24 | GK | KAZ | Dzhurakhon Babakhanov |
| 26 | DF | UKR | Denys Vasilyev |
| 27 | FW | UKR | Oleksandr Yarovenko |
| 28 | DF | UKR | Dmytro Bashlay |
| 77 | GK | KAZ | Zhasur Narzikulov |

== Transfers ==
=== Winter ===
In: Note: Flags indicate national team as defined under FIFA eligibility rules; some limited exceptions apply. Players may hold more than one non-FIFA nationality.

| No. | Pos. | Nation | Player |
|---|---|---|---|
| 2 | DF | SUR | Sigourney Bandjar (from (Netherlands) RKC Waalwijk) |
| 12 | FW | KAZ | Aleksey Shchetkin (from (Kazakhstan) Atyrau) |
| 15 | DF | SLO | Rok Roj (from (Slovenia) NK Zavrc) |
| 18 | MF | SRB | Jovan Golić (from (Kazakhstan) Atyrau) |
| 19 | FW | FRA | Richard Barroilhet (from (England) Nuneaton Town) |
| 20 | MF | NED | Desley Ubbink (from (Netherlands) RKC Waalwijk) |

Out: Note: Flags indicate national team as defined under FIFA eligibility rules; some limited exceptions apply. Players may hold more than one non-FIFA nationality.

| No. | Pos. | Nation | Player |
|---|---|---|---|
| 4 | DF | SRB | Ersin Mehmedović (to (Serbia) Novi Pazar) |
| 15 | MF | SEN | Abdoulaye Diakate (to (Kazakhstan) Ordabasy) |
| 18 | MF | RUS | Nikolai Nesterenko |
| 19 | FW | SRB | Miroslav Lečić |
| 29 | FW | NGR | Obiora Odita |
| 50 | FW | CMR | Titi Essomba (to (Finland) AC Oulu) |

=== Summer ===
In: Note: Flags indicate national team as defined under FIFA eligibility rules; some limited exceptions apply. Players may hold more than one non-FIFA nationality.

| No. | Pos. | Nation | Player |
|---|---|---|---|
| 26 | DF | UKR | Denys Vasilyev (from (Ukraine) Naftovyk-Ukrnafta Okhtyrka) |
| 27 | FW | UKR | Oleksandr Yarovenko (from (Ukraine) Naftovyk-Ukrnafta Okhtyrka) |
| 28 | DF | UKR | Dmytro Bashlay (from (Ukraine) Naftovyk-Ukrnafta Okhtyrka) |
| 77 | GK | KAZ | Zhasur Narzikulov (from (Kazakhstan) Aktobe) |

Out: Note: Flags indicate national team as defined under FIFA eligibility rules; some limited exceptions apply. Players may hold more than one non-FIFA nationality.

| No. | Pos. | Nation | Player |
|---|---|---|---|
| 10 | MF | KAZ | Baūyrzhan Baytana (to (Kazakhstan) Kairat) |
| 19 | FW | FRA | Richard Barroilhet (to (France) Étoile Fréjus Saint-Raphaël) |

== Competitions ==
=== Kazakhstan Premier League ===
==== First round ====
===== Results summary =====
| Overall | | | | | | | | Home | | | | | | Away | | | | | |
| Pld | W | D | L | GF | GA | GD | Pts | W | D | L | GF | GA | GD | W | D | L | GF | GA | GD |
|---|---|---|---|---|---|---|---|---|---|---|---|---|---|---|---|---|---|---|---|
| 22 | 5 | 4 | 13 | 21 | 34 | −13 | 19 | 4 | 2 | 5 | 18 | 19 | −1 | 1 | 2 | 8 | 3 | 15 | −12 |

Last updated: 27 January 2015.
Source: Soccerway

===== Results =====
| 15 March 2014 1 | Taraz | 0 – 2 | Aktobe | Taraz |
| 16:00 (UTC+6) | Kozhamberdi (yellow card) 27'; Dosmagambetov (yellow card) 70'; M.Amirkhanov (yellow card) 73' | Summary | Khairullin 41' (pen.); Bandjar 43' (o.g.) | Stadium: Central Stadium; Attendance: 2,000; Referee: Igor Khisamutdinov |

| 22 March 2014 2 | Kaisar | 0 – 0 | Taraz | Kyzylorda |
| 16:00 (UTC+6) | A.Baltaev (yellow card) 46' | Summary | Barroilhet (yellow card) 14' | Stadium: Gany Muratbayev Stadium; Attendance: 4,000; Referee: Anatolyi Vishnichenko |

| 29 March 2014 3 | Taraz | 1 – 5 | Shakhter Karagandy | Taraz |
| 15:00 (UTC+6) | Barroilhet (yellow card) 31'; Vorotnikov (yellow card) 75'; Roj 80' | Summary | Vičius 15'; Konysbayev 44'; Salomov 53', 68'; Finonchenko 70'; Paryvaew (yellow card) 89' | Stadium: Central Stadium; Attendance: 3,000; Referee: Bolat Karlibayev |

| 5 April 2014 4 | Astana | 1 – 0 | Taraz | Astana |
| 16:00 (UTC+6) | Y.Akhmetov (yellow card) 19'; Dzholchiev 65' | Summary | V.Yevstigneyev (yellow card) 26'; Shchetkin (yellow card) 28'; Barroilhet (yellow card) 35'; M.Amirkhanov (yellow card) 50' | Stadium: Astana Arena; Attendance: 4,000; Referee: Denis Izmailov |

| 9 April 2014 5 | Taraz | 2 – 0 | Spartak Semey | Taraz |
| 16:00 (UTC+6) | Skorykh 58'; Shchetkin 71' | Summary | | Stadium: Central Stadium; Attendance: 2,600; Referee: Viktor Antonov |

| 13 April 2014 6 | Kairat | 3 – 1 | Taraz | Almaty |
| 18:00 (UTC+6) | Marković 36'; Knežević 41'; E.Kuantayev (yellow card) 52'; Kislitsyn 90+3' | Summary | Vorotnikov (yellow card) 55'; Shchetkin 70'; Roj (yellow card) 79' | Stadium: Central Stadium; Attendance: 3,000; Referee: Marat Iskakov |

| 19 April 2014 7 | Taraz | 3 – 3 | Atyrau | Taraz |
| 16:00 (UTC+6) | Dosmagambetov 56'; Tleshev 69' (yellow card) 90+2'; Sergienko (yellow card) 70'; Roj (yellow card) 75'; Golić 90' (yellow card) 90+2' (yellow-red card) 90+3' | Summary | Essame 30', 88'; Butuyev (yellow card) 33'; Parkhachev (yellow card) 55'; Trifunović 59'; Odibe (yellow card) 90+2'; Karpovich (yellow card) 90+4' | Stadium: Central Stadium; Attendance: 4,100; Referee: Artyom Kuchin |

| 27 April 2014 8 | Tobol | 1 – 0 | Taraz | Kostanay |
| 16:00 (UTC+6) | Bogdanov 51' (yellow card) 80'; Kurgulin (yellow card) 78'; O.Krasić (yellow card) 90+3' | Summary | D.Yevstigneyev (yellow card) 39'; Shchetkin (yellow card) 58'; Vorotnikov (yellow card) 72' | Stadium: Central Stadium; Attendance: 2,500; Referee: Aydin Rakhimbayev |

| 1 May 2014 9 | Taraz | 1 – 0 | Zhetysu | Taraz |
| 15:00 (UTC+6) | Dosmagambetov (yellow card) 32'; Tleshev (yellow card) 71'; Shchetkin 88' | Summary | Đalović (yellow card) 45' (yellow-red card) 55'; Rodionov (yellow card) 83' (yellow-red card) 89' | Stadium: Central Stadium; Attendance: 4,000; Referee: Aleksandr Aliyev |

| 6 May 2014 10 | Irtysh | 2 – 0 | Taraz | Pavlodar |
| 18:00 (UTC+6) | Govedarica (yellow card) 11'; Dudchenko 19'; Bakayev 73' | Summary | | Stadium: Central Stadium; Attendance: 2,500; Referee: Timur Kumashev |

| 10 May 2014 11 | Taraz | 2 – 1 | Ordabasy | Taraz |
| 17:00 (UTC+6) | Shchetkin 9'; V.Yevstigneyev (yellow card) 36'; Vorotnikov 43' | Summary | Nurgaliev (yellow card) 18' (goal) 90+2'; Diakate (yellow card) 52'; Kasyanov (yellow card) 63' | Stadium: Central Stadium; Attendance: 3,800; Referee: Igor Aleshin |

| 18 May 2014 12 | Taraz | 0 – 1 | Kaisar | Taraz |
| 17:00 (UTC+6) | M.Amirkhanov (yellow card) 70' | Summary | R.Rozybakiev (yellow card) 62'; Hunt 89' (pen.) | Stadium: Central Stadium; Attendance: 3,000; Referee: Aleksandr Gauzer |

| 24 May 2014 13 | Shakhter Karagandy | 1 – 0 | Taraz | Karagandy |
| 17:30 (UTC+6) | Vasiljević (yellow card) 84'; Baizhanov (yellow card) 84'; Topcagić 90+2' | Summary | Vorotnikov (yellow card) 30'; Sergienko (yellow card) 84'; Skorykh (yellow card) 88'; D.Babakhanov (yellow card) 90+1' | Stadium: Shakhter Stadium; Attendance: 5,000; Referee: Aleksandr Gauzer |

| 28 May 2014 14 | Taraz | 1 – 2 | Astana | Taraz |
| 18:00 (UTC+6) | Tleshev 68' | Summary | Y.Akhmetov (yellow card) 30'; Dzholchiev 63'; Shakhmetov (yellow card) 66'; Kurdov 84'; Cañas (yellow card) 90+4' | Stadium: Central Stadium; Attendance: 3,800; Referee: Igor Khisamutdinov |

| 1 June 2014 15 | Spartak Semey | 0 – 1 | Taraz | Semey |
| 17:00 (UTC+6) | Čović (yellow card) 25'; S.Sagindikov (yellow card) 55'; A.Yersalimov (yellow card) 73' | Summary | Tleshev 57'; Baytana (yellow card) 59'; Ubbink (yellow card) 82' | Stadium: Spartak Stadium; Attendance: 3,000; Referee: Aydin Rakhimbayev |

| 14 June 2014 16 | Taraz | 2 – 3 | Kairat | Taraz |
| 18:00 (UTC+6) | Tleshev 15'; Skorykh 55'; Shchetkin (yellow card) 73'; Dosmagambetov (yellow card) 80' | Summary | Islamkhan 7', 64' (yellow card) 15'; Marković 54' (yellow card) 73' | Stadium: Central Stadium; Attendance: 3,850; Referee: Igor Chesnokov |

| 22 June 2014 17 | Atyrau | 3 – 0 | Taraz | Atyrau |
| 20:00 (UTC+6) | Karpovich (yellow card) 8'; Trifunović 12' (pen.), 37'; Odibe 45' (yellow card) 89'; Plaskonny (yellow card) 51'; Abdulin (yellow card) 73' | Summary | Bashlay (yellow card) 62' | Stadium: Munaishy Stadium; Attendance: 2,500; Referee: Aleksandr Aliyev |

| 28 June 2014 18 | Taraz | 1 – 1 | Tobol | Taraz |
| 18:00 (UTC+6) | Tleshev 74' | Summary | O.Krasić (yellow card) 62'; Bugaiov (yellow card) 83' | Stadium: Central Stadium; Attendance: 1,500; Referee: Marat Iskakov |

| 5 July 2014 19 | Zhetysu | 1 – 0 | Taraz | Taldykorgan |
| 18:00 (UTC+6) | V.Kuzmin (yellow card) 69'; Ahmetović 90+2' (yellow card) 90+3' | Summary | Roj (yellow card) 51'; Shchetkin (yellow card) 69' | Stadium: Zhetysu Stadium; Attendance: 3,500; Referee: Akmalkhan Kholmatov |

| 12 July 2014 20 | Taraz | 5 – 1 | Irtysh | Taraz |
| 18:00 (UTC+6) | Tleshev 16', 40'; Ubbink (yellow card) 45+1' (goal) 80'; O.Nedashkovsky (yellow card) 65'; Kozhamberdi 74'; O.Yarovenko 90+1' | Summary | Mukhutdinov 36' (yellow card) 45+1'; A.Ayaganov (yellow card) 52'; Chichulin (yellow card) 79'; Starokin (yellow card) 90' | Stadium: Central Stadium; Attendance: 1,100; Referee: Denis Izmailov |

| 26 July 2014 21 | Ordabasy | 1 – 1 | Taraz | Shymkent |
| 18:00 (UTC+6) | T.Adyrbekov (yellow card) 30'; Nurgaliev (yellow card) 47'; Mukhtarov (yellow card) 62'; Kasyanov 71'; B.Beisenov (yellow card) 88' | Summary | O.Yarovenko 80' (yellow card) 83' | Stadium: Kazhimukan Munaitpasov Stadium; Attendance: 4,000; Referee: Anatolyi Vishnichenko |

| 2 August 2014 22 | Aktobe | 2 – 0 | Taraz | Aktobe |
| 20:00 (UTC+6) | Arzumanyan 32'; Khairullin 43'; Logvinenko (yellow card) 43'; Shabalin (yellow card) 77' | Summary | Kuchma (yellow card) 41'; Ubbink (yellow card) 56'; Kozhamberdi (yellow card) 88' | Stadium: Central Stadium; Attendance: 8,000; Referee: Ruslan Duzmambetov |

===== League table =====
| Pos | Team | Pld | W | D | L | GF | GA | GD | Pts | Qualification |
|---|---|---|---|---|---|---|---|---|---|---|
| 8 | Tobol | 22 | 6 | 8 | 8 | 22 | 29 | −7 | 26 | Qualification for the relegation round |
| 9 | Irtysh Pavlodar | 22 | 6 | 6 | 10 | 28 | 35 | −7 | 24 (Note: ATY 0–1 IRT; IRT 0-1 ATY) | Qualification for the relegation round |
| 10 | Atyrau | 22 | 6 | 6 | 10 | 19 | 27 | −8 | 24 | Qualification for the relegation round |
| 11 | Taraz | 22 | 5 | 4 | 13 | 21 | 34 | −13 | 19 | Qualification for the relegation round |
| 12 | Spartak Semey | 22 | 3 | 5 | 14 | 16 | 41 | −25 | 14 | Qualification for the relegation round |

Source: Soccerway (in Russian)
Rules for classification: 1st points;
Two team tiebreak: 1st overall wins; 2nd head-to-head record; 3rd goals difference; 4th goals scored; 5th away goals scored;
Multiple teams tiebreak: 1st overall wins; 2nd goals difference; 3rd goals scored; 4th away goals scored

==== Relegation round ====
===== Results summary =====
| Overall | | | | | | | | Home | | | | | | Away | | | | | |
| Pld | W | D | L | GF | GA | GD | Pts | W | D | L | GF | GA | GD | W | D | L | GF | GA | GD |
|---|---|---|---|---|---|---|---|---|---|---|---|---|---|---|---|---|---|---|---|
| 10 | 4 | 3 | 3 | 11 | 11 | 0 | 15 | 3 | 1 | 1 | 6 | 5 | +1 | 1 | 2 | 2 | 5 | 6 | −1 |

Last updated: 21 January 2015.
Source: Soccerway

===== Results =====
| 23 August 2014 1 | Spartak Semey | 0 – 0 | Taraz | Semey |
| 17:00 (UTC+6) | Genev (yellow card) 58'; Rudzik (red card) 90+2' | Summary | O.Nedashkovsky (yellow card) 41'; D.Yevstigneyev (yellow card) 59'; Golić (yellow card) 75'; Bashlay (yellow card) 79' | Stadium: Spartak Stadium; Attendance: 1,500; Referee: Artyom Kuchin |

| 29 August 2014 2 | Taraz | 2 – 0 | Zhetysu | Taraz |
| 19:00 (UTC+6) | Kozhamberdi 40'; O.Nedashkovsky 43'; Kuchma (yellow card) 58' | Summary | Ergashev (yellow card) 81'; S.Schaff (yellow card) 85' | Stadium: Central Stadium; Attendance: 3,200; Referee: Akmalkhan Kholmatov |

| 14 September 2014 3 | Tobol | 3 – 0 | Taraz | Kostanay |
| 17:00 (UTC+6) | Zhumaskaliyev 9'; Volkov (yellow card) 49'; Kušnír (yellow card) 53' (goal) 69'; Jeslínek 58'; R.Dzhalilov (yellow card) 90+3' | Summary | O.Nedashkovsky (yellow card) 60' | Stadium: Central Stadium; Attendance: 2,500; Referee: Igor Aleshin |

| 20 September 2014 4 | Taraz | 2 – 1 | Atyrau | Taraz |
| 18:00 (UTC+6) | O.Yarovenko 61'; Dosmagambetov (yellow card) 78' (goal) 88' | Summary | Parkhachev (yellow card) 59'; Trifunovic 79' | Stadium: Central Stadium; Attendance: 3,500; Referee: Denis Tevyashov |

| 28 September 2014 5 | Irtysh | 0 – 0 | Taraz | Pavlodar |
| 15:00 (UTC+6) | Džudović (yellow card) 74'; Amanow (yellow card) 87' | Summary | O.Yarovenko (yellow card) 62' | Stadium: Central Stadium; Attendance: 3,000; Referee: Akmalkhan Kholmatov |

| 3 October 2014 6 | Zhetysu | 0 – 3 | Taraz | Taldykorgan |
| 16:00 (UTC+6) | Ergashev (yellow card) 45'; S.Sariyev (yellow card) 90+3' | Summary | O.Nedashkovsky (yellow card) 42'; Shchetkin 63'; Kozhamberdi 76'; O.Yarovenko 79' | Stadium: Zhetysu Stadium; Attendance: 2,000; Referee: Aydin Rakhimbayev |

| 19 October 2014 7 | Taraz | 1 – 1 | Tobol | Taraz |
| 17:00 (UTC+6) | D.Yevstigneyev (yellow card) 19'; D.Bayaliev (yellow card) 38'; Shchetkin 74' | Summary | O.Krasić 39'; Kurgulin (yellow card) 71' | Stadium: Central Stadium; Attendance: 2,800; Referee: Igor Khisamutdinov |

| 25 October 2014 8 | Atyrau | 3 – 2 | Taraz | Atyrau |
| 17:00 (UTC+6) | Adiyiah (yellow card) 10'; Trifunović 15' (pen.); A.Shakin 53'; Karpovich 55'; Blažić (yellow card) 71' | Summary | Dosmagambetov 19', 41' | Stadium: Munaishy Stadium; Attendance: 1,000; Referee: Anatolyi Vishnichenko |

| 1 November 2014 9 | Taraz | 0 – 3 | Irtysh | Taraz |
| 17:00 (UTC+6) | O.Nedashkovsky (yellow card) 14'; Sergienko (yellow card) 26' (red card) 35'; Bashlay (yellow card) 81'; Dosmagambetov (yellow card) 81' | Summary | Bulgaru (yellow card) 26'; Valeyev 34' (yellow card) 74'; Ivanov (yellow card) 60' (goal) 77'; K.Begalyn 67'; Burzanović (yellow card) 82' | Stadium: Central Stadium; Attendance: 3,600; Referee: Ruslan Duzmambetov |

| 9 November 2014 10 | Taraz | 1 – 0 | Spartak Semey | Taraz |
| 15:00 (UTC+6) | Vasilyev (yellow card) 32'; Shchetkin 45+1' (pen.); Kuchma (yellow card) 63'; Kozhamberdi (yellow card) 69'; Ubbink (yellow card) 90+3' | Summary | Jovanović (yellow card) 32'; Kutsov (yellow card) 61'; Y.Nurgaliyev (yellow card) 66'; Dyulgerov (yellow card) 90+1' | Stadium: Central Stadium; Attendance: 4,300; Referee: Akmalkhan Kholmatov |

===== Table =====
| Pos | Team | Pld | W | D | L | GF | GA | GD | Pts | Relegation |
|---|---|---|---|---|---|---|---|---|---|---|
| 8 | Zhetysu | 32 | 10 | 8 | 14 | 21 | 31 | −10 | 25 | |
| 9 | Atyrau | 32 | 10 | 7 | 15 | 30 | 43 | −13 | 25 | |
| 10 | Irtysh Pavlodar | 32 | 9 | 10 | 13 | 39 | 44 | −5 | 25 | |
| 11 | Taraz (O) | 32 | 9 | 7 | 16 | 32 | 45 | −13 | 25 | Qualification for the relegation play-off |
| 12 | Spartak Semey (R) | 32 | 7 | 7 | 18 | 30 | 52 | −22 | 21 | Relegation to the Kazakhstan First Division |

Source: Soccerway (in Russian)
Rules for classification: 1st points;
Two team tiebreak: 1st overall wins; 2nd head-to-head record; 3rd goals difference; 4th goals scored; 5th away goals scored;
Multiple teams tiebreak: 1st overall wins; 2nd goals difference; 3rd goals scored; 4th away goals scored.
Team start with half number of points from first round.
(O) Play-off winners; (R) Relegated

==== Relegation play-off ====
| 16 November 2014 Second round | Taraz | 1 – 1 (3 – 1 p) | Kyran | Astana |
| 15:00 (UTC+6) | Bashlay (yellow card) 54'; D.Yevstigneyev (yellow card) 58'; Yarovenko 59' | Summary | A.Mynbayev (yellow card) 20'; Zhumakhanov 21' (yellow card) 104' (yellow-red card) 120'; Önal (yellow card) 74'; G.Ermurzaev (yellow card) 90+1'; P.Pishchulin (yellow card) 101' | Stadium: Astana Arena; Attendance: 500; Referee: Aydin Rakhimbayev |

=== Kazakhstan Cup ===
| 14 May 2014 Second round | Taraz | 3 – 0 | Ordabasy | Taraz |
| 17:00 (UTC+6) | Kozhamberdi 15'; Ubbink 55'; Tleshev 63' (pen.) | Summary | Mukhtarov (yellow card) 36'; Irismetov; D.Tungyshbayev (yellow card) 89' | Stadium: Taraz Central Stadium; Attendance: 4,200; Referee: Igor Khisamutdinov |

| 18 June 2014 Quarter-final | Aktobe | 2 – 1 | Taraz | Aktobe |
| 20:00 (UTC+6) | Antonov 22', 88' (yellow card) 25'; E.Levin (yellow card) 90+1' | Summary | M.Amirkhanov (yellow card) 25'; Tleshev 62' (yellow card) 71' (red card) 90+5' | Stadium: Central Stadium; Attendance: 10,000; Referee: Viktor Antonov |

== Squad statistics ==
As of Match played 16 November 2014

=== Appearances and goals ===
| No. | Pos | Nat | Player | Total | | Premier League | | Relegation Playoff | | Kazakhstan Cup | |
| No. | Pos | Nat | Player | Apps | Goals | Apps | Goals | Apps | Goals | Apps | Goals |
|---|---|---|---|---|---|---|---|---|---|---|---|
| 1 | GK | (Kazakhstan) KAZ | Ramil Nurmukhametov | 7 | 0 | 7 | 0 | 0 | 0 | 0 | 0 |
| 2 | DF | (Suriname) SUR | Sigourney Bandjar | 12 | 0 | 9+2 | 0 | 0 | 0 | 0+1 | 0 |
| 3 | DF | (Kazakhstan) KAZ | Aleksandr Kuchma | 14 | 0 | 12 | 0 | 0+1 | 0 | 1 | 0 |
| 4 | DF | (Kazakhstan) KAZ | Ilya Vorotnikov | 24 | 1 | 23 | 1 | 0 | 0 | 1 | 0 |
| 5 | DF | (Kazakhstan) KAZ | Sergey Skorykh | 30 | 2 | 23+4 | 2 | 1 | 0 | 1+1 | 0 |
| 6 | MF | (Kazakhstan) KAZ | Dmitri Yevstigneyev | 24 | 0 | 18+4 | 0 | 1 | 0 | 1 | 0 |
| 7 | MF | (Kazakhstan) KAZ | Eduard Sergienko | 28 | 0 | 24+2 | 0 | 0 | 0 | 2 | 0 |
| 8 | MF | (Kazakhstan) KAZ | Vitali Yevstigneyev | 6 | 0 | 4+1 | 0 | 0 | 0 | 1 | 0 |
| 9 | FW | (Kazakhstan) KAZ | Murat Tleshev | 26 | 9 | 6+17 | 7 | 1 | 0 | 1+1 | 2 |
| 11 | MF | (Kazakhstan) KAZ | Timur Dosmagambetov | 25 | 4 | 12+10 | 4 | 1 | 0 | 1+1 | 0 |
| 12 | FW | (Kazakhstan) KAZ | Aleksey Shchetkin | 26 | 7 | 17+7 | 7 | 0 | 0 | 1+1 | 0 |
| 14 | DF | (Kazakhstan) KAZ | Berik Aitbayev | 16 | 0 | 10+3 | 0 | 1 | 0 | 2 | 0 |
| 15 | DF | (Slovenia) SLO | Rok Roj | 26 | 1 | 24 | 1 | 0 | 0 | 2 | 0 |
| 17 | MF | (Kazakhstan) KAZ | Oleg Nedashkovsky | 15 | 1 | 12+1 | 1 | 1 | 0 | 1 | 0 |
| 18 | MF | (Serbia) SRB | Jovan Golić | 26 | 1 | 25+1 | 1 | 0 | 0 | 0 | 0 |
| 20 | MF | (Netherlands) NED | Desley Ubbink | 21 | 2 | 17+3 | 1 | 0 | 0 | 0+1 | 1 |
| 21 | DF | (Kazakhstan) KAZ | Daniyar Bayaliev | 11 | 0 | 6+5 | 0 | 0 | 0 | 0 | 0 |
| 22 | MF | (Kazakhstan) KAZ | Maksat Amirkhanov | 18 | 0 | 10+7 | 0 | 0 | 0 | 1 | 0 |
| 23 | MF | (Kazakhstan) KAZ | Zhakyp Kozhamberdi | 26 | 4 | 14+10 | 3 | 1 | 0 | 1 | 1 |
| 24 | GK | (Kazakhstan) KAZ | Dzhurakhon Babakhanov | 13 | 0 | 12 | 0 | 0 | 0 | 1 | 0 |
| 26 | DF | (Ukraine) UKR | Denys Vasilyev | 16 | 0 | 15 | 0 | 1 | 0 | 0 | 0 |
| 27 | FW | (Ukraine) UKR | Oleksandr Yarovenko | 15 | 5 | 7+7 | 4 | 1 | 1 | 0 | 0 |
| 28 | DF | (Ukraine) UKR | Dmytro Bashlay | 16 | 0 | 15 | 0 | 1 | 0 | 0 | 0 |
| 77 | GK | (Kazakhstan) KAZ | Zhasur Narzikulov | 15 | 0 | 13 | 0 | 1 | 0 | 1 | 0 |
| | MF | (Kazakhstan) KAZ | Abzal Taubay | 1 | 0 | 0 | 0 | 0+1 | 0 | 0 | 0 |
Players who appeared for Taraz that left during the season:
| 10 | MF | (Kazakhstan) KAZ | Baūyrzhan Baytana | 16 | 0 | 12+2 | 0 | 0 | 0 | 2 | 0 |
| 19 | FW | (France) FRA | Richard Barroilhet | 9 | 0 | 5+4 | 0 | 0 | 0 | 0 | 0 |

=== Goal scorers ===
| Place | Position | Nation | Number | Name | Premier League | Relegation Playoff | Kazakhstan Cup | Total |
|---|---|---|---|---|---|---|---|---|
| 1 | FW | (Kazakhstan) | 9 | Murat Tleshev | 7 | 0 | 2 | 9 |
| 2 | FW | (Kazakhstan) | 12 | Aleksey Shchetkin | 7 | 0 | 0 | 7 |
| 3 | FW | (Ukraine) | 27 | Oleksandr Yarovenko | 4 | 1 | 0 | 5 |
| 4 | MF | (Kazakhstan) | 11 | Timur Dosmagambetov | 4 | 0 | 0 | 4 |
| 4 | MF | (Kazakhstan) | 23 | Zhakyp Kozhamberdi | 3 | 0 | 1 | 4 |
| 6 | MF | (Kazakhstan) | 5 | Sergei Skorykh | 2 | 0 | 0 | 2 |
| 6 | MF | (Netherlands) | 20 | Desley Ubbink | 1 | 0 | 1 | 2 |
| 8 | DF | (Slovenia) | 15 | Rok Roj | 1 | 0 | 0 | 1 |
| 8 | MF | (Serbia) | 18 | Jovan Golić | 1 | 0 | 0 | 1 |
| 8 | DF | (Kazakhstan) | 4 | Ilya Vorotnikov | 1 | 0 | 0 | 1 |
| 8 | MF | (Kazakhstan) | 17 | Oleg Nedashkovsky | 1 | 0 | 0 | 1 |
| | | | | TOTALS | 32 | 1 | 4 | 37 |

=== Disciplinary record ===
| Number | Nation | Position | Name | Premier League | | Relegation Playoff | | Kazakhstan Cup | | Total | |
| Number | Nation | Position | Name | Yellow card | Red card | Yellow card | Red card | Yellow card | Red card | Yellow card | Red card |
| 3 | (Kazakhstan) | DF | Aleksandr Kuchma | 3 | 0 | 0 | 0 | 0 | 0 | 3 | 0 |
| 4 | (Kazakhstan) | DF | Ilya Vorotnikov | 4 | 0 | 0 | 0 | 0 | 0 | 4 | 0 |
| 5 | (Kazakhstan) | DF | Sergey Skorykh | 1 | 0 | 0 | 0 | 0 | 0 | 1 | 0 |
| 6 | (Kazakhstan) | MF | Dmitri Yevstigneyev | 6 | 0 | 1 | 0 | 0 | 0 | 7 | 0 |
| 7 | (Kazakhstan) | MF | Eduard Sergienko | 4 | 1 | 0 | 0 | 0 | 0 | 4 | 1 |
| 9 | (Kazakhstan) | FW | Murat Tleshev | 2 | 0 | 0 | 0 | 2 | 1 | 4 | 1 |
| 10 | (Kazakhstan) | MF | Baūyrzhan Baytana | 1 | 0 | 0 | 0 | 0 | 0 | 1 | 0 |
| 11 | (Kazakhstan) | MF | Timur Dosmagambetov | 5 | 0 | 0 | 0 | 0 | 0 | 5 | 0 |
| 12 | (Kazakhstan) | FW | Aleksey Shchetkin | 4 | 0 | 0 | 0 | 0 | 0 | 4 | 0 |
| 15 | (Slovenia) | DF | Rok Roj | 3 | 0 | 0 | 0 | 0 | 0 | 3 | 0 |
| 17 | (Kazakhstan) | MF | Oleg Nedashkovsky | 5 | 0 | 0 | 0 | 0 | 0 | 5 | 0 |
| 18 | (Serbia) | MF | Jovan Golić | 3 | 1 | 0 | 0 | 0 | 0 | 3 | 1 |
| 19 | (France) | FW | Richard Barroilhet | 3 | 0 | 0 | 0 | 0 | 0 | 3 | 0 |
| 20 | (Netherlands) | MF | Desley Ubbink | 4 | 0 | 0 | 0 | 0 | 0 | 4 | 0 |
| 22 | (Kazakhstan) | MF | Maksat Amirkhanov | 3 | 0 | 0 | 0 | 1 | 0 | 4 | 0 |
| 23 | (Kazakhstan) | MF | Zhakyp Kozhamberdi | 3 | 0 | 0 | 0 | 0 | 0 | 3 | 0 |
| 24 | (Kazakhstan) | GK | Dzhurakhon Babakhanov | 1 | 0 | 0 | 0 | 0 | 0 | 1 | 0 |
| 26 | (Ukraine) | DF | Denys Vasilyev | 1 | 0 | 0 | 0 | 0 | 0 | 1 | 0 |
| 27 | (Ukraine) | FW | Oleksandr Yarovenko | 2 | 0 | 0 | 0 | 0 | 0 | 2 | 0 |
| 28 | (Ukraine) | DF | Dmytro Bashlay | 4 | 0 | 1 | 0 | 0 | 0 | 5 | 0 |
| | | | TOTALS | 62 | 2 | 2 | 0 | 3 | 1 | 67 | 3 |
