= 2015 FC Taraz season =

FC Taraz
2015 season
- Manager: Evgeny Yarovenko
- Stadium: Central Stadium
- Kazakhstan Premier League: 9th
- Kazakhstan Cup: Quarter Final vs Kairat
- Top goalscorer: League: Oleksandr Pyschur (9); All: Oleksandr Pyschur (9)
Home colours	Away colours

The 2015 FC Taraz season is the seventh successive season that the club will play in the Kazakhstan Premier League, the highest tier of association football in Kazakhstan, and 22nd in total. Taraz will play in the Kazakhstan Premier League as well as the Kazakhstan Cup.

== Squad ==
As of 26 February 2015

Note: Flags indicate national team as defined under FIFA eligibility rules; some limited exceptions apply. Players may hold more than one non-FIFA nationality.

No.	Pos.	Nation	Player
1	GK	KAZ	Aleksandr Grigorenko
2	DF	KAZ	Daniyar Bayaliev
3	MF	UKR	Dmytro Bashlay
4	DF	KAZ	Ilya Vorotnikov
5	MF	SRB	Jovan Golić
6	MF	KAZ	Abzal Taubay
7	MF	KAZ	Eduard Sergienko
9	FW	KAZ	Sanat Zhumahanov
11	FW	KAZ	Sherkhan Bauyrzhan
12	DF	ROU	Ioan Mera
13	FW	NGR	Izu Azuka
14	DF	UKR	Denys Vasilyev
16	GK	KAZ	Azat Bitabarov

No.	Pos.	Nation	Player
17	FW	UKR	Oleksandr Pyschur
18	MF	KAZ	Alisher Suley
19	MF	KAZ	Dmitri Yevstigneyev
21	DF	KAZ	Maksat Amirkhanov
22	DF	KAZ	Madiyar Nuraly
23	MF	KAZ	Timur Dosmagambetov
24	GK	KAZ	Dzhurakhon Babakhanov
27	FW	UKR	Oleksandr Yarovenko
30	MF	KAZ	Evgeniy Averchenko
39	MF	KAZ	Yelzhan Toktybayev
44	MF	KAZ	Adilet Abdenabi
74	MF	RUS	Alan Gatagov
77	MF	RUS	Almir Mukhutdinov

=== Reserve team ===
Note: Flags indicate national team as defined under FIFA eligibility rules; some limited exceptions apply. Players may hold more than one non-FIFA nationality.

No.	Pos.	Nation	Player
28	MF	KAZ	Nurdaulet Seidikhanov
29	MF	KAZ	Bakdaulet Daribayev
31	MF	KAZ	Zhambyl Moldashbayev
32	MF	KAZ	Ruslan Islamov
34	MF	KAZ	Meirzhan Balken
35	MF	KAZ	Dauren Amirkhanov

No.	Pos.	Nation	Player
36	MF	KAZ	Sundet Barat
37	MF	KAZ	Dinmukhamed Oralov
38	MF	KAZ	Mukhamedzhan Baimakhanov
39	MF	KAZ	Yelzhan Toktybayev
—	DF	KAZ	Vitali Kachagin
—	FW	KAZ	Yerbol Ondashev

== Transfers ==
=== Winter ===
In: Note: Flags indicate national team as defined under FIFA eligibility rules; some limited exceptions apply. Players may hold more than one non-FIFA nationality.

No.	Pos.	Nation	Player
1	GK	KAZ	Aleksandr Grigorenko (from (Kazakhstan) Ordabasy)
9	FW	KAZ	Sanat Zhumahanov
11	FW	KAZ	Sherkhan Bauyrzhan (from (Kazakhstan) Shakhter Karagandy)
12	DF	ROU	Ioan Mera (from (Romania) Rapid București)
17	FW	UKR	Oleksandr Pyschur (from (Uzbekistan) Bunyodkor)
22	DF	KAZ	Madiyar Nuraly
30	MF	KAZ	Evgeniy Averchenko (from (Kazakhstan) Irtysh)
77	MF	RUS	Almir Mukhutdinov (from (Kazakhstan) Irtysh)

Out: Note: Flags indicate national team as defined under FIFA eligibility rules; some limited exceptions apply. Players may hold more than one non-FIFA nationality.

No.	Pos.	Nation	Player
1	GK	KAZ	Ramil Nurmukhametov (to (Kazakhstan) Kaisar)
2	DF	SUR	Sigourney Bandjar
3	DF	KAZ	Aleksandr Kuchma
5	MF	KAZ	Sergei Skorykh (to (Kazakhstan) Kaisar)
9	FW	KAZ	Murat Tleshev (to (Kazakhstan) Atyrau)
12	FW	KAZ	Aleksey Shchetkin (to (Kazakhstan) Astana)
13	DF	KAZ	Berik Aitbayev (to (Kazakhstan) Atyrau)
15	DF	SLO	Rok Roj (to (Uzbekistan) Nasaf)
17	MF	KAZ	Oleg Nedashkovsky (to (Kazakhstan) Tobol)
77	DF	KAZ	Zhasur Narzikulov (to (Kazakhstan) Atyrau)

=== Summer ===
In: Note: Flags indicate national team as defined under FIFA eligibility rules; some limited exceptions apply. Players may hold more than one non-FIFA nationality.

No.	Pos.	Nation	Player
13	FW	NGR	Izu Azuka (from (Kazakhstan) Irtysh Pavlodar)
18	MF	KAZ	Alisher Suley (from (Kazakhstan) Irtysh Pavlodar)
74	MF	RUS	Alan Gatagov (from (Kazakhstan) Irtysh Pavlodar)

Out: Note: Flags indicate national team as defined under FIFA eligibility rules; some limited exceptions apply. Players may hold more than one non-FIFA nationality.

No.	Pos.	Nation	Player
10	MF	KAZ	Zhakyp Kozhamberdy (to (Kazakhstan) Astana)
18	MF	KAZ	Vitali Yevstigneyev
20	MF	NED	Desley Ubbink (to (Kazakhstan) Shakhter Karagandy)

== Competitions ==
=== Kazakhstan Premier League ===
==== First round ====
===== Results summary =====
Overall								Home						Away					
Pld	W	D	L	GF	GA	GD	Pts	W	D	L	GF	GA	GD	W	D	L	GF	GA	GD
22	7	3	12	18	24	−6	24	5	3	3	10	4	+6	2	0	9	8	20	−12

Last updated: 28 July 2015.
Source: Soccerway

===== Results by round =====
Round	1	2	3	4	5	6	7	8	9	10	11	12	13	14	15	16	17	18	19	20	21	22
Ground	H	A	H	H	A	H	A	H	A	H	A	H	A	A	H	A	H	A	H	A	H	A
Result	D	L	L	W	L	W	W	W	L	D	W	L	L	L	L	L	W	L	W	L	D	L
Position	9	8	11	8	9	7	6	5	6	6	6	6	7	7	7	9	7	9	8	8	8	8

Source: Soccerway
A = Away; H = Home; W = Win; D = Draw; L = Loss

===== Results =====
7 March 2015 1	Taraz	0 – 0	Shakhter Karagandy	Taraz
15:00 (UTC+6)	D.Yevstigneyev (yellow card) 57'; Ubbink (yellow card) 87'	Summary	Paryvaew (yellow card) 56'; M.Gabyshev (yellow card) 87'; David (yellow card) 87'	Stadium: Central Stadium; Attendance: 1,500; Referee: Bolat Karlibayev

11 March 2015 2	Atyrau	2 – 1	Taraz	Atyrau
15:00 (UTC+6)	Trifunović 28' (yellow card) 46'; Baizhanov 89'; Tleshev (yellow card) 90+1'; Ivanović (yellow card) 90+2'	Summary	Golić 6'; Vasilyev (yellow card) 17' (red card) 90+1'	Stadium: Munaishy Stadium; Attendance: 1,850; Referee: Anatolyi Vishnichenko

15 March 2015 3	Taraz	0 – 1	Aktobe	Taraz
15:00 (UTC+6)		Summary	Khizhnichenko 32'; Mineiro (yellow card) 40'; D.Miroshnichenko (yellow card) 55'	Stadium: Central Stadium; Attendance: 2,000; Referee: Viktor Antonov

21 March 2015 4	Taraz	1 – 0	Kairat	Taraz
14:00 (UTC+6)	Pyschur 28'; Mera (yellow card) 53'	Summary	Marković (yellow card) 58'; Bakayev (yellow card) 73'	Stadium: Central Stadium; Attendance: 3,000; Referee: Akmalkhan Kholmatov

5 April 2015 5	Ordabasy	1 – 0	Taraz	Shymkent
14:00 (UTC+6)	E.Tungyshbaev 51'; Boychenko (yellow card) 65'; Petrov (yellow card) 67'; Ashirbekov (yellow card) 90+2'	Summary	Mera (yellow card) 43'; Mukhutdinov (yellow card) 90+2'; Vasilyev (red card)	Stadium: Kazhimukan Munaitpasov Stadium; Attendance: 3,000; Referee: Denis Izmailov

10 April 2015 6	Taraz	2 – 0	Astana	Taraz
15:00 (UTC+6)	Pyschur 28'; Bashlay (yellow card) 45' (yellow-red card) 74'; Sergienko 68'	Summary	Y.Akhmetov (yellow card) 41'	Stadium: Central Stadium; Attendance: 5,000; Referee: Artyom Kuchin

15 April 2015 7	Kaisar	1 – 3	Taraz	Kyzylorda
16:00 (UTC+6)	Muzhikov (yellow card) 43'; Muldarov 69'	Summary	Mera 24'; Pyschur 31', 57' (pen.); A.Taubay (yellow card) 69'	Stadium: Gany Muratbayev Stadium; Attendance: 2,000; Referee: Aydin Rakhimbayev

19 April 2015 8	Taraz	1 – 0	Tobol	Taraz
18:00 (UTC+6)	Mukhutdinov 55'; S.Zhumahanov (yellow card) 75'	Summary	A.Agaysin (yellow card) 77'; Šljivić (red card) 90+2'	Stadium: Central Stadium; Attendance: 5,500; Referee: Aleksandr Aliyev

25 April 2015 9	Zhetysu	1 – 0	Taraz	Taldykorgan
17:00 (UTC+6)	Cvetković (yellow card) 74'; Despotović 90' (yellow card) 90+1'	Summary	Bashlay (yellow card) 46'; Mukhutdinov (yellow card) 74'	Stadium: Zhetysu Stadium; Attendance: 1,500; Referee: Igor Aleshin

3 May 2015 10	Taraz	1 – 1	Okzhetpes	Taraz
14:00 (UTC+6)	A.Taubay 13'; Mukhutdinov (yellow card) 37'; A.Abdenabi (yellow card) 50'	Summary	Buleshev 31'; Chertov (yellow card) 45+1'; Di Chiara (yellow card) 52'; R.Sakhalbayev (yellow card) 79'; I.Asovskiy (yellow card) 81'; Tsirin (yellow card) 90+3'	Stadium: Central Stadium; Attendance: 4,500; Referee: Marat Iskakov

7 May 2015 11	Irtysh	0 – 1	Taraz	Pavlodar
17:00 (UTC+6)	A.Ersalimov (yellow card) 55'	Summary	O.Yarovenko 35'; Golić (yellow card) 55'	Stadium: Central Stadium; Attendance: 2,500; Referee: Akmalkhan Kholmatov

16 May 2015 12	Taraz	0 – 1	Atyrau	Taraz
18:00 (UTC+6)	Bashlay (yellow card) 52'; Z.Kozhamberdy (yellow card) 84'	Summary	B.Aitbayev 6'; Essame (yellow card) 44'	Stadium: Central Stadium; Attendance: 5,500; Referee: Daniyar Sakhi

24 May 2015 13	Aktobe	3 – 1	Taraz	Aktobe
18:00 (UTC+6)	Aimbetov 19'; D.Miroshnichenko (yellow card) 58'; A.Tagybergen (yellow card) 61' (goal) 67'; Dmitrenko (yellow card) 74' (goal) 87'	Summary	D.Yevstigneyev (yellow card) 8' (goal) 64'; Z.Kozhamberdy (yellow card) 58'	Stadium: Central Stadium; Attendance: 3,000; Referee: Timur Kumashev

29 May 2015 14	Kairat	2 – 0	Taraz	Almaty
19:00 (UTC+6)	Gohou (yellow card) 58' (goal) 69', 86'; Marković (yellow card) 73'	Summary	Dosmagambetov (yellow card) 43'; M.Togyzbay (yellow card) 48'	Stadium: Central Stadium; Attendance: 8,500; Referee: Denis Izmailov

6 June 2015 15	Taraz	0 – 1	Ordabasy	Taraz
19:00 (UTC+6)	Bashlay (yellow card) 47'; S.Zhumahanov (yellow card) 65'; Mera (yellow card) 80'; Z.Kozhamberdy (yellow card) 89'; Pyschur (yellow card) 90+4'	Summary	E.Tungyshbaev 5' (yellow card) 87'; Kasyanov (yellow card) 12'; Nurgaliev (yellow card) 46'	Stadium: Central Stadium; Attendance: 6,000; Referee: Ruslan Duzmambetov

19 June 2015 16	Astana	4 – 1	Taraz	Astana
17:30 (UTC+6)	Nusserbayev 21' (yellow card) 52'; Twumasi (yellow card) 35'; Shchetkin 62'; Dedechko (yellow card) 70'; Postnikov (yellow card) 72'; Zhukov 75'; Kéthévoama 87'; Cañas (yellow card) 90+2'; Aničić (yellow card) 90+4'	Summary	Mukhutdinov (yellow card) 19'; S.Zhumahanov (yellow card) 65'; D.Yevstigneyev (yellow card) 76'; Dosmagambetov 80' (pen.); M.Togyzbay (yellow card) 83'	Stadium: Astana Arena; Attendance: 2,000; Referee: Viktor Antonov

24 June 2015 17	Taraz	3 – 0	Kaisar	Taraz
19:00 (UTC+6)	Pyschur 3'; S.Zhumahanov 31'; Golić 71'	Summary	Shestakov (yellow card) 21'; Hunt (yellow card) 47'; R.Rozybakiev (yellow card) 76'; Strukov (yellow card) 81'	Stadium: Central Stadium; Attendance: 4,000; Referee: Denis Izmailov

28 June 2015 18	Tobol	3 – 0	Taraz	Kostanay
18:00 (UTC+6)	I.Yurin 11', 40'; Zyankovich 21'; A.Agaysin (yellow card) 33'; Matulevičius (yellow card) 45+1'	Summary	Z.Kozhamberdy (red card) 77'	Stadium: Central Stadium; Attendance: 3,000; Referee: Igor Aleshin

4 July 2015 19	Taraz	2 – 0	Zhetysu	Taraz
19:00 (UTC+6)	Dosmagambetov (yellow card) 30'; A.Suley 61'; Pyschur 84'	Summary	Shakhmetov (yellow card) 27'; Vičius (yellow card) 32'	Stadium: Central Stadium; Attendance: 3,000; Referee: Marat Iskakov

11 July 2015 20	Okzhetpes	2 – 0	Taraz	Kokshetau
19:00 (UTC+6)	Volkov (yellow card) 39'; Rotkovic 41' (pen.); Gridin 85'	Summary	M.Amirkhanov (yellow card) 45+1'	Stadium: Okzhetpes Stadium; Attendance: 2,500; Referee: Aydin Rakhimbayev

18 July 2015 21	Taraz	0 – 0	Irtysh	Taraz
18:00 (UTC+6)	Mukhutdinov (yellow card) 13'; M.Amirkhanov (yellow card) 49'; Vasilyev (yellow card) 66'; S.Zhumahanov (yellow card) 90+2'	Summary	Fonseca (yellow card) 40'	Stadium: Central Stadium; Attendance: 3,500; Referee: Denis Izmailov

26 July 2015 22	Shakhter Karagandy	2 – 0	Taraz	Karaganda
19:00 (UTC+6)	Vasiljević (yellow card) 17'; Vošahlík (yellow card) 50'; Karpovich (yellow card) 60'; Feshchuk 76'; Đidić (yellow card) 81'; R.Murtazayev 90+4'	Summary	Pyschur (yellow card) 38'; Mera (yellow card) 42'; D.Yevstigneyev (yellow card) 52'; Vasilyev (yellow card) 59'; Dosmagambetov (yellow card) 70'	Stadium: Shakhter Stadium; Attendance: 3,000; Referee: Sergey Gorokhovodatskiy

===== League table =====
Pos	Team	Pld	W	D	L	GF	GA	GD	Pts	Qualification
7	Okzhetpes	22	8	2	12	24	33	−9	26	Qualification for the relegation round
8	Tobol	22	7	4	11	22	32	−10	25	Qualification for the relegation round
9	Taraz	22	7	3	12	17	25	−8	24	Qualification for the relegation round
10	Shakhter Karagandy	22	5	3	14	16	38	−22	18	Qualification for the relegation round
11	Zhetysu	22	4	5	13	17	32	−15	17	Qualification for the relegation round

Source: UEFA.com, Soccerway
Rules for classification: 1) Points; 2) Matches won; 3) Head-to-head points; 4) Head-to-head matches won; 5) Head-to-head goal difference; 6) Head-to-head goals scored; 7) Head-to-head away goals scored; 8) Goal difference; 9) Goals scored; 10) Away goals scored; 11) Draw.

==== Relegation round ====
===== Results summary =====
Overall								Home						Away					
Pld	W	D	L	GF	GA	GD	Pts	W	D	L	GF	GA	GD	W	D	L	GF	GA	GD
10	3	5	2	8	8	0	14	3	2	0	8	4	+4	0	3	2	0	4	−4

Last updated: 10 November 2015.
Source: Soccerway

===== Results by round =====
Round	1	2	3	4	5	6	7	8	9	10
Ground	A	A	H	A	H	H	A	H	A	H
Result	D	L	D	D	W	W	D	W	L	D
Position	8	10	10	9	9	9	9	9	9	9

Source: Soccerway
A = Away; H = Home; W = Win; D = Draw; L = Loss

===== Results =====
15 August 2015 23	Kaisar	–	Taraz	Kyzylorda
18:00 (UTC+6)	S.Keiler (red card) 26'; R.Rozybakiev (yellow card) 41'; Knežević (yellow card) 62'	[ Summary]	Azuka (red card) 26'; M.Amirkhanov (yellow card) 26'; Bashlay (yellow card) 36'	Stadium: Gani Muratbayev Stadium; Attendance: 3,500; Referee: Denis Tevyashov

23 August 2015 24	Zhetysu	1 – 0	Taraz	Taldykorgan
17:00 (UTC+6)	Turysbek (yellow card) 19'; Samigullin (yellow card) 21'; Savić 67'; A.Pasechenko (yellow card) 90+3'	Summary	S.Zhumahanov (yellow card) 70'; Gatagov (yellow card) 77'; Pyschur (yellow card) 89'; Mukhutdinov (yellow card) 90'	Stadium: Zhetysu Stadium; Attendance: 2,500; Referee: Aleksandr Aliyev

12 September 2015 25	Taraz	3 – 3	Okzhetpes	Taraz
18:00 (UTC+6)	Mera (yellow card) 6'; D.Yevstigneyev (yellow card) 11'; A.Suley 30'; Dosmagambetov 53'; S.Zhumahanov 74'; Mukhutdinov (yellow card) 90+3'	Summary	Pawlaw 79'; Gridin 90'; Cvetković 90+3' (pen.)	Stadium: Central Stadium; Attendance: 3,500; Referee: Daniyar Sakhi

19 September 2015 26	Tobol	0 – 0	Taraz	Kostanay
17:00 (UTC+6)	Šimkovič (yellow card) 43'	Summary	Averchenko (yellow card) 40'; Vasilyev (yellow card) 49'; D.Yevstigneyev (yellow card) 55'	Stadium: Central Stadium; Attendance: 1,000; Referee: Sergey Gorokhovodatskiy

27 September 2015 27	Taraz	2 – 0	Shakhter Karagandy	Taraz
16:00 (UTC+6)	Azuka 13' (pen.); Bashlay (yellow card) 14'; Mera (yellow card) 52'; Pyschur 79'	Summary	Dimov (red card) 12'	Stadium: Central Stadium; Attendance: 2,000; Referee: Igor Aleshin

3 October 2015 28	Taraz	1 – 0	Zhetysu	Taraz
16:00 (UTC+6)	Mukhutdinov 3' (yellow card) 71'; Sergienko (yellow card) 30'; M.Amirkhanov (yellow card) 89'	Summary	Turysbek (yellow card) 7'; Galiakberov (yellow card) 23'	Stadium: Central Stadium; Attendance: 1,500; Referee: Denis Tevyashov

18 October 2015 29	Okzhetpes	0 – 0	Taraz	Kokshetau
17:00 (UTC+6)	Khokhlov (yellow card) 85'	Summary	Bashlay (yellow card) 50'; Dosmagambetov (yellow card) 90'	Stadium: Okzhetpes Stadium; Attendance: 2,000; Referee: Aleksandr Gauzer

24 October 2015 30	Taraz	1 – 0	Tobol	Taraz
17:00 (UTC+6)	Mera (yellow card) 57'; D.Yevstigneyev (yellow card) 64'; Pyschur 90+2'	Summary	T.Elmurzayev (yellow card) 31'; O.Nedashkovsky (yellow card) 78'	Stadium: Central Stadium; Attendance: 1,000; Referee: Furkat Atajanow

31 October 2015 31	Shakhter Karagandy	3 – 0	Taraz	Karaganda
15:00 (UTC+6)	Topčagić 5' (yellow card) 25'; Karpovich 57'; V.Vasiliev 60' (yellow card) 90+2'; Ubbink (yellow card) 69'	Summary	Mera (yellow card) 41'; O.Yarovenko (yellow card) 68'; Dosmagambetov (yellow card) 73'	Stadium: Shakhter Stadium; Attendance: 1,000; Referee: Igor Aleshin

8 November 2015 32	Taraz	1 – 1	Kaisar	Taraz
15:00 (UTC+6)	Pyschur 32' (pen.); Gatagov (yellow card) 61' (yellow-red card) 90+3'; Bashlay (yellow card) 69'; S.Zhumahanov (yellow card) 71' (yellow-red card) 72'	Summary	Z.Moldakaraev 24'; R.Nurmukhametov (yellow card) 90+3'	Stadium: Central Stadium; Attendance: 2,000; Referee: Timur Kumashev

===== League table =====
Pos	Team	Pld	W	D	L	GF	GA	GD	Pts	Relegation
7	Tobol	32	12	6	14	32	42	−10	30	
8	Okzhetpes	32	12	6	14	36	41	−5	29	
9	Taraz	32	10	8	14	25	33	−8	26	
10	Shakhter Karagandy	32	9	5	18	27	47	−20	23	
11	Zhetysu (O)	32	8	6	18	28	46	−18	22	Qualification for the relegation play-off
12	Kaisar (R)	32	4	12	16	20	36	−16	16	Relegation to the Kazakhstan First Division

Source: Soccerway
Rules for classification: 1) Points; 2) Matches won; 3) Head-to-head points; 4) Head-to-head matches won; 5) Head-to-head goal difference; 6) Head-to-head goals scored; 7) Head-to-head away goals scored; 8) Goal difference; 9) Goals scored; 10) Away goals scored; 11) Draw.
(O) Play-off winners; (R) Relegated

=== Kazakhstan Cup ===
29 April 2015 Second Round	Ordabasy	0 – 1	Taraz	Shymkent
17:00 (UTC+6)	Trajković (yellow card) 19'; Kozhabayev (yellow card) 27'	Report	Toktybayev (yellow card) 24' (goal) 63'; V.Yevstigneyev (yellow card) 53'	Stadium: Kazhimukan Munaitpasov Stadium; Attendance: 2,000; Referee: Ruslan Duzmambetov

20 May 2015 Quarterfinal	Kairat	4 – 1	Taraz	Almaty
19:00 (UTC+6)	Gohou 6', 58'; Islamkhan 13'; Kukeyev 87'	Summary	S.Zhumahanov (yellow card) 16'; A.Taubay (yellow card) 28'; Mukhutdinov 62' (pen.)	Stadium: Central Stadium; Attendance: 7,500; Referee: Igor Aleshin

== Squad statistics ==
As of Match played 8 November 2015

=== Appearances and goals ===
No.	Pos	Nat	Player	Total		Premier League		Kazakhstan Cup	
No.	Pos	Nat	Player	Apps	Goals	Apps	Goals	Apps	Goals
1	GK	(Kazakhstan) KAZ	Aleksandr Grigorenko	22	0	21	0	1	0
2	DF	(Kazakhstan) KAZ	Daniyar Bayaliev	4	0	4	0	0	0
3	MF	(Ukraine) UKR	Dmytro Bashlay	25	0	23+1	0	0+1	0
4	DF	(Kazakhstan) KAZ	Ilya Vorotnikov	25	0	23+1	0	1	0
5	MF	(Serbia) SRB	Jovan Golić	20	2	16+2	2	2	0
6	MF	(Kazakhstan) KAZ	Abzal Taubay	15	1	8+6	1	1	0
7	MF	(Kazakhstan) KAZ	Eduard Sergienko	24	1	12+11	1	0+1	0
9	FW	(Kazakhstan) KAZ	Sanat Zhumahanov	28	2	16+11	2	1	0
11	FW	(Kazakhstan) KAZ	Sherkhan Bauyrzhan	6	0	1+3	0	1+1	0
12	DF	(Romania) ROU	Ioan Mera	31	1	30	1	1	0
13	FW	(Nigeria) NGR	Izu Azuka	8	1	7+1	1	0	0
14	DF	(Ukraine) UKR	Denys Vasilyev	17	0	15+1	0	1	0
16	GK	(Kazakhstan) KAZ	Azat Bitabarov	4	0	2+2	0	0	0
17	FW	(Ukraine) UKR	Oleksandr Pyschur	34	9	23+9	9	1+1	0
18	MF	(Kazakhstan) KAZ	Alisher Suley	14	2	14	2	0	0
19	MF	(Kazakhstan) KAZ	Dmitri Yevstigneyev	27	1	25	1	2	0
21	DF	(Kazakhstan) KAZ	Maksat Amirkhanov	16	0	14+1	0	1	0
22	DF	(Kazakhstan) KAZ	Madiyar Nuraly	4	0	4	0	0	0
23	MF	(Kazakhstan) KAZ	Timur Dosmagambetov	30	2	21+8	2	1	0
24	GK	(Kazakhstan) KAZ	Dzhurakhon Babakhanov	9	0	8	0	1	0
27	FW	(Ukraine) UKR	Oleksandr Yarovenko	22	1	8+13	1	1	0
30	MF	(Kazakhstan) KAZ	Evgeniy Averchenko	21	0	18+2	0	1	0
32	DF	(Kazakhstan) KAZ	Marat Togyzbay	2	0	2	0	0	0
39	MF	(Kazakhstan) KAZ	Yelzhan Toktybayev	1	1	0	0	1	1
44	MF	(Kazakhstan) KAZ	Adilet Abdenabi	5	0	3+2	0	0	0
74	MF	(Russia) RUS	Alan Gatagov	6	0	0+6	0	0	0
77	MF	(Russia) RUS	Almir Mukhutdinov	25	3	24	2	1	1
	DF	(Kazakhstan) KAZ	Adilet Rymtaev	1	0	0+1	0	0	0
	MF	(Kazakhstan) KAZ	Bakhytzhan Rymtaev	1	0	0+1	0	0	0
	MF	(Kazakhstan) KAZ	Alibek Satybaldy	1	0	1	0	0	0
Players away from Taraz on loan:
Players who appeared for Taraz that left during the season:
10	MF	(Kazakhstan) KAZ	Zhakyp Kozhamberdy	14	0	6+6	0	0+2	0
18	MF	(Kazakhstan) KAZ	Vitali Yevstigneyev	2	0	0+1	0	1	0
20	MF	(Netherlands) NED	Desley Ubbink	10	0	1+7	0	2	0

=== Goal scorers ===
Place	Position	Nation	Number	Name	Premier League	Kazakhstan Cup	Total
1	FW	(Ukraine)	17	Oleksandr Pyschur	9	0	9
2	MF	(Russia)	77	Almir Mukhutdinov	2	1	3
3	MF	(Serbia)	5	Jovan Golić	2	0	2
3	FW	(Kazakhstan)	9	Sanat Zhumahanov	2	0	2
3	MF	(Kazakhstan)	18	Alisher Suley	2	0	2
3	MF	(Kazakhstan)	23	Timur Dosmagambetov	2	0	2
7	MF	(Kazakhstan)	7	Eduard Sergienko	1	0	1
7	DF	(Romania)	12	Ioan Mera	1	0	1
7	MF	(Kazakhstan)	6	Abzal Taubay	1	0	1
7	FW	(Ukraine)	27	Oleksandr Yarovenko	1	0	1
7	MF	(Kazakhstan)	19	Dmitri Yevstigneyev	1	0	1
7	FW	(Nigeria)	13	Izu Azuka	1	0	1
7	MF	(Kazakhstan)	39	Yelzhan Toktybayev	0	1	1
				TOTALS	25	2	27

=== Disciplinary record ===
Number	Nation	Position	Name	Premier League		Kazakhstan Cup		Total	
Number	Nation	Position	Name	Yellow card	Red card	Yellow card	Red card	Yellow card	Red card
3	(Ukraine)	MF	Dmytro Bashlay	9	1	0	0	9	1
5	(Serbia)	MF	Jovan Golić	1	0	0	0	1	0
6	(Kazakhstan)	MF	Abzal Taubay	1	0	1	0	2	0
7	(Kazakhstan)	MF	Eduard Sergienko	1	0	0	0	1	0
9	(Kazakhstan)	FW	Sanat Zhumahanov	7	1	1	0	8	1
10	(Kazakhstan)	MF	Zhakyp Kozhamberdy	3	1	0	0	3	1
12	(Romania)	DF	Ioan Mera	8	0	0	0	8	0
14	(Ukraine)	DF	Denys Vasilyev	4	2	0	0	4	2
17	(Ukraine)	FW	Oleksandr Pyschur	3	0	0	0	3	0
18	(Kazakhstan)	MF	Vitali Yevstigneyev	0	0	1	0	1	0
19	(Kazakhstan)	MF	Dmitri Yevstigneyev	7	0	0	0	7	0
20	(Netherlands)	MF	Desley Ubbink	1	0	0	0	1	0
21	(Kazakhstan)	DF	Maksat Amirkhanov	4	0	0	0	4	0
23	(Kazakhstan)	MF	Timur Dosmagambetov	5	0	0	0	5	0
27	(Ukraine)	FW	Oleksandr Yarovenko	1	0	0	0	1	0
30	(Kazakhstan)	MF	Evgeniy Averchenko	1	0	0	0	1	0
39	(Kazakhstan)	MF	Yelzhan Toktybayev	0	0	1	0	1	0
74	(Russia)	MF	Alan Gatagov	3	1	0	0	3	1
77	(Russia)	MF	Almir Mukhutdinov	8	0	0	0	8	0
89	(Nigeria)	FW	Izu Azuka	0	1	0	0	0	1
	(Kazakhstan)	MF	Adilet Abdenabi	2	0	0	0	2	0
	(Kazakhstan)	DF	Marat Togyzbay	1	0	0	0	1	0
			TOTALS	71	7	4	0	75	7
