= 2014 Kazakhstan Premier League =

Kazakhstan Premier League
- Season: 2014
- Champions: Astana (1st title)
- Relegated: Spartak Semey
- Champions League: Astana
- Europa League: Kairat; Aktobe; Ordabasy
- Matches: 192
- Goals: 465 (2.42 per match)
- Top goalscorer: Foxi Kéthévoama (15)
- Biggest home win: Kairat 7–1 Aktobe (R19)
- Biggest away win: Taraz 1–5 Shakhter (R3)
- Highest scoring: Astana 5–3 Irtysh (R17); Kairat 7–1 Aktobe (R19)

The 2014 Kazakhstan Premier League was the 23rd season of the Kazakhstan Premier League, the highest football league competition in Kazakhstan. The season began on 15 March 2014 and was finished in November. Aktobe were the defending champions having won their fifth league championship the previous year.

== Teams ==
FC Vostok and FC Akzhayik were relegated at the end of the 2013 season, and were replaced by FC Kaisar and Spartak Semey.

=== Team overview ===
Locations of teams in the 2014 Kazakhstan Premier League

Team	Location	Venue	Capacity
Aktobe	Aktobe	Aktobe Central Stadium	15,000
Astana	Astana	Astana Arena	30,000
Atyrau	Atyrau	Munaishy Stadium	9,500
Irtysh	Pavlodar	Pavlodar Central Stadium	15,000
Kairat	Almaty	Almaty Central Stadium	25,057
Kaisar	Kyzylorda	Gany Muratbayev Stadium	7,500
Ordabasy	Shymkent	Kazhimukan Munaitpasov Stadium	35,000
Shakhter	Karagandy	Shakhter Stadium	20,000
Spartak Semey	Semey	Spartak Stadium	8,000
Taraz	Taraz	Taraz Central Stadium	11,525
Tobol	Kostanay	Kostanay Central Stadium	10,500
Zhetysu	Taldykorgan	Zhetysu Stadium	4,000

=== Personnel and kits ===
Note: Flags indicate national team as has been defined under FIFA eligibility rules. Players and Managers may hold more than one non-FIFA nationality.

Team	Manager	Captain	Kit manufacturer	Shirt sponsor
Aktobe	(Kazakhstan) Vladimir Nikitenko	(Kazakhstan) Petr Badlo	Adidas	—
Astana	(Bulgaria) Stanimir Stoilov	(Kazakhstan) Kairat Nurdauletov	Adidas	Samruk-Kazyna
Atyrau	(Belarus) Anatoliy Yurevich	(Kazakhstan) Valentin Chureev	Adidas,	—
Irtysh	(Kazakhstan) Talgat Baisufinov	(Kazakhstan) Sergei Ivanov	Adidas	ENRC
Kairat	(Slovakia) Vladimír Weiss	(Kazakhstan) Kyril Shestakov	Nike	KazRosGaz
Kaisar	(Kazakhstan) Dmitriy Ogai		Nike	—
Ordabasy	(Ukraine) Viktor Pasulko	(Kazakhstan) Kairat Ashirbekov	Adidas	TAU
Shakhter	(Russia) Viktor Kumykov	(Kazakhstan) Andrey Finonchenko	Lotto	—
Spartak Semey	(Kazakhstan) Almas Kulshinbayev		Adidas	—
Taraz	(Ukraine) Evgeny Yarovenko	(Kazakhstan) Vitali Yevstigneyev	Adidas	—
Tobol	(Kazakhstan) Timur Urazov	(Kazakhstan) Nurbol Zhumaskaliyev	Adidas	—
Zhetysu	(Russia) Omari Tetradze	(Kazakhstan) Zahar Korobov	Adidas	—

=== Managerial changes ===
Team	Outgoing manager	Manner of departure	Date of vacancy	Position in table	Replaced by	Date of appointment
Atyrau	(Montenegro) Miodrag Radulović		8 November 2013	Pre Season	(Belarus) Anatoliy Yurevich	4 December 2013
Kaisar	(Kazakhstan) Sergei Volgin		17 November 2013	Pre Season	(Kazakhstan) Dmitriy Ogai	30 November 2013
Astana	(Romania) Ioan Andone	End of contract	27 November 2013	Pre Season	(Uzbekistan) Vadim Abramov	28 November 2013
Astana	(Uzbekistan) Vadim Abramov	Contract canceled	13 December 2013	Pre Season	(Kazakhstan) Grigori Babayan	1 January 2014
Taraz	(Netherlands) Arno Pijpers		10 June 2014		(Ukraine) Evgeny Yarovenko	10 June 2014
Astana	(Kazakhstan) Grigori Babayan	End of caretaker spell	21 June 2014		(Bulgaria) Stanimir Stoilov	21 June 2014

=== Foreign players ===
The number of foreign players is restricted to seven per KPL team. A team can use only five foreign players on the field in each game.

Club	Player 1	Player 2	Player 3	Player 4	Player 5	Player 6	Player 7
Aktobe	(Trinidad and Tobago) **Robert Primus**	(Armenia) **Robert Arzumanyan**	(Armenia) **Marcos Pizzelli**	(Uzbekistan) **Timur Kapadze**	(Brazil) Danilo Neco	(Brazil) Anderson Mineiro	(Ukraine) **Oleksiy Antonov**
Astana	(Bosnia and Herzegovina) Marin Aničić	(Montenegro) Damir Kojašević	(Colombia) Roger Cañas	(Cameroon) **Guy Essame**	(Ghana) **Patrick Twumasi**	(Bulgaria) Atanas Kurdov	(Central African Republic) **Foxi Kéthévoama**
Atyrau	(Nigeria) **Michael Odibe**	(Serbia) Marko Blažić	(Georgia (country)) Giorgi Peikrishvili	(Serbia) Miloš Trifunović	(Ghana) **Dominic Adiyiah**		
Irtysh	(Montenegro) **Miodrag Dzudovic**	(Montenegro) **Igor Burzanovic**	(Ukraine) Kostyantyn Dudchenko	(Bulgaria) Orlin Starokin	(Moldova) **Simeon Bulgaru**	(Ukraine) Rinar Valeyev	
Kairat	(Slovakia) **Ľubomír Michalík**	(Serbia) Žarko Marković	(Croatia) Josip Knežević	(Armenia) **Artur Yedigaryan**	(Spain) Sito Riera	(Brazil) Isael da Silva Barbosa	(Ivory Coast) Gerard Gohou
Kaisar	(Czech Republic) **Martin Klein**	(Serbia) Miljan Jablan	(Mali) **Mamoutou Coulibaly**	(Slovenia) Matic Maruško	(Estonia) **Rimo Hunt**	(North Macedonia) **Dušan Savić**	(Moldova) Valentin Furdui
Ordabasy	(Uganda) **Andrew Mwesigwa**	(Brazil) Freire	(Ukraine) Artem Kasyanov	(Senegal) Abdoulaye Diakate	(Czech Republic) Ondřej Kúdela		
Shakhter	(Serbia) Aleksandar Simčević	(Lithuania) **Gediminas Vičius**	(Uzbekistan) **Shavkat Salomov**	(Uzbekistan) **Kamoliddin Murzoev**	(Austria) Mihret Topcagić	(Croatia) **Nikola Pokrivač**	(Slovakia) Ján Maslo
Spartak Semey	(Bulgaria) Viktor Genev	(Serbia) Nemanja Čović	(Bulgaria) Nikolay Dyulgerov	(Bulgaria) Daniel Peev	(Serbia) Nemanja Jovanović	(Armenia) Artur Avagyan	(Serbia) Goran Obradović
Taraz	(Netherlands) Sigourney Bandjar	(Slovenia) Rok Roj	(Serbia) Jovan Golić	(Netherlands) Desley Ubbink	(Ukraine) Denys Vasilyev	(Ukraine) Oleksandr Yarovenko	(Ukraine) Dmytro Bashlay
Tobol	(Czech Republic) Štěpán Kučera	(Czech Republic) **Ondřej Kušnír**	(Serbia) Ognjen Krasić	(Austria) Tomáš Šimkovič	(Serbia) Nenad Šljivić	(Czech Republic) Jiří Jeslínek	(Belarus) Ivan Sadownichy
Zhetysu	(Ivory Coast) Didier Kadio	(Lithuania) **Arūnas Klimavičius**	(Serbia) Marko Putinčanin	(Serbia) Marko Đalović	(Ivory Coast) Boti Demel	(Bosnia and Herzegovina) Mersudin Ahmetović	(Tajikistan) **Davron Ergashev**

In bold: Players that have been capped for their national team.

== First round ==
=== League table ===
Pos	Team	Pld	W	D	L	GF	GA	GD	Pts	Qualification
1	Aktobe	22	12	7	3	34	17	+17	43	Qualification for the championship round
2	Kairat	22	13	3	6	41	20	+21	42	Qualification for the championship round
3	Astana	22	10	9	3	34	17	+17	39	Qualification for the championship round
4	Shakhter Karagandy	22	11	3	8	33	27	+6	36	Qualification for the championship round
5	Ordabasy	22	10	5	7	24	22	+2	35	Qualification for the championship round
6	Kaisar	22	8	8	6	23	23	0	32	Qualification for the championship round
7	Zhetysu	22	7	6	9	15	18	−3	27	Qualification for the relegation round
8	Tobol	22	6	8	8	22	29	−7	26	Qualification for the relegation round
9	Irtysh Pavlodar	22	6	6	10	28	35	−7	24 (Note: ATY 0–1 IRT; IRT 0-1 ATY)	Qualification for the relegation round
10	Atyrau	22	6	6	10	19	27	−8	24	Qualification for the relegation round
11	Taraz	22	5	4	13	21	34	−13	19	Qualification for the relegation round
12	Spartak Semey	22	3	5	14	16	41	−25	14	Qualification for the relegation round

Source: Soccerway (in Russian)
Rules for classification: 1st points;
Two team tiebreak: 1st overall wins; 2nd head-to-head record; 3rd goals difference; 4th goals scored; 5th away goals scored;
Multiple teams tiebreak: 1st overall wins; 2nd goals difference; 3rd goals scored; 4th away goals scored

=== Results ===
Home \ Away	AKT	AST	ATY	IRT	KRT	KSR	ORD	SHA	SEM	TAR	TOB	ZHE
Aktobe		1–1	0–0	3–0	1–0	3–0	1–1	4–0	3–0	2–0	3–1	1–0
Astana	1–2		3–0	5–3	2–2	1–0	1–1	4–0	5–0	1–0	1–0	0–0
Atyrau	0–0	1–0		0–1	0–3	1–3	1–1	3–2	2–1	3–0	0–0	1–2
Irtysh Pavlodar	1–1	3–4	0–1		0–1	1–1	2–0	1–0	5–0	2–0	0–3	1–0
Kairat	7–1	0–0	0–1	2–1		1–0	0–1	2–0	4–1	3–1	3–1	2–1
Kaisar	2–2	1–0	2–1	4–2	0–1		1–0	1–0	1–1	0–0	0–0	0–0
Ordabasy	1–0	0–1	1–0	2–1	1–0	2–1		2–1	2–1	1–1	3–0	1–1
Shakhter Karagandy	1–1	0–0	2–0	2–2	1–0	4–1	3–1		1–0	1–0	4–1	3–0
Spartak Semey	0–1	1–1	2–1	0–0	2–5	1–1	2–0	0–1		0–1	2–1	1–1
Taraz	0–2	1–1	3–3	5–1	2–3	0–1	2–1	1–5	2–0		1–1	1–0
Tobol	0–2	1–1	0–0	1–1	2–2	1–1	2–1	2–0	2–1	1–0		0–2
Zhetysu	1–0	0–0	1–0	0–0	1–0	1–2	0–1	1–2	1–0	1–0	1–2	

Legend: Blue = home team win; Yellow = draw; Red = away team win.

== Second round ==
=== Championship round ===
==== League table ====
Pos	Team	Pld	W	D	L	GF	GA	GD	Pts	Qualification
1	Astana (C)	32	18	10	4	63	26	+37	45	Qualification for the Champions League second qualifying round
2	Aktobe	32	17	10	5	52	31	+21	40	Qualification for the Europa League first qualifying round
3	Kairat	32	18	5	9	58	31	+27	38	Qualification for the Europa League first qualifying round
4	Ordabasy	32	13	5	14	34	44	−10	27	Qualification for the Europa League first qualifying round
5	Kaisar	32	10	13	9	30	34	−4	27	
6	Shakhter Karagandy	32	11	6	15	41	49	−8	21	

Source: Soccerway (in Russian)
Rules for classification: 1st points;
Two team tiebreak: 1st overall wins; 2nd head-to-head record; 3rd goals difference; 4th goals scored; 5th away goals scored;
Multiple teams tiebreak: 1st overall wins; 2nd goals difference; 3rd goals scored; 4th away goals scored.
Team start with half number of points from first round.
(C) Champions

==== Results ====
Home \ Away	AKT	AST	KRT	KSR	ORD	SHA
Aktobe		3–0	1–0	0–0	4–1	3–1
Astana	6–1		5–1	3–0	5–0	2–0
Kairat	2–0	2–3		1–1	2–0	6–1
Kaisar	2–2	1–1	0–2		0–1	2–1
Ordabasy	1–3	1–2	0–1	0–1		3–2
Shakhter Karagandy	1–1	0–2	0–0	0–0	2–3	

Legend: Blue = home team win; Yellow = draw; Red = away team win.

=== Relegation round ===
==== League table ====
Pos	Team	Pld	W	D	L	GF	GA	GD	Pts	Relegation
7	Tobol (Note: Tobol have had 3 point(s) deducted.)	32	10	12	10	35	35	0	26	
8	Zhetysu	32	10	8	14	21	31	−10	25	
9	Atyrau	32	10	7	15	30	43	−13	25	
10	Irtysh Pavlodar	32	9	10	13	39	44	−5	25	
11	Taraz (O)	32	9	7	16	32	45	−13	25	Qualification for the relegation play-off
12	Spartak Semey (R)	32	7	7	18	30	52	−22	21	Relegation to the Kazakhstan First Division

Source: Soccerway (in Russian)
Rules for classification: 1st points;
Two team tiebreak: 1st overall wins; 2nd head-to-head record; 3rd goals difference; 4th goals scored; 5th away goals scored;
Multiple teams tiebreak: 1st overall wins; 2nd goals difference; 3rd goals scored; 4th away goals scored.
Team start with half number of points from first round.
(O) Play-off winners; (R) Relegated

==== Results ====
Home \ Away	ATY	IRT	SEM	TAR	TOB	ZHE
Atyrau		2–1	1–1	3–2	0–3	1–0
Irtysh Pavlodar	2–0		3–2	0–0	1–1	1–1
Spartak Semey	3–1	2–0		0–0	2–1	3–1
Taraz	2–1	0–3	1–0		1–1	2–0
Tobol	1–2	0–0	1–0	3–0		2–0
Zhetysu	1–0	1–0	2–1	0–3	0–0	

Legend: Blue = home team win; Yellow = draw; Red = away team win.

== Relegation play-offs ==
16 November 2014
11:00 (UTC+6)

Taraz	1–1 (a.e.t.)	Kyran
Yarovenko 59'	Summary	Zhumakhanov 24'
Penalties
Dosmagambetov (penalty missed); Evstigneev (penalty scored); Kuchma (penalty missed); Bashlay (penalty scored); Kozhamberdy (penalty scored)	3–1	Kozyulin (penalty missed); Önal (penalty missed); Pishchulin (penalty missed); Amirseitov (penalty scored)

Astana Arena
Attendance: 500
Referee: Aidyn Rahinbaev

== Season statistics ==
=== Top scorers ===
As of Match played 9 November 2014

Rank	Player	Club	Goals
1	(Central African Republic) Foxi Kéthévoama	Astana	15
2	(Serbia) Miloš Trifunović	Atyrau	13
3	(Ivory Coast) Gerard Gohou	Kairat	12
4	(Ukraine) Kostyantyn Dudchenko	Irtysh	11
4	(Ghana) Patrick Twumasi	Astana	11
6	(Bosnia and Herzegovina) Mihret Topcagić	Shakhter	10
7	(Kazakhstan) Marat Khairullin	Aktobe	9
8	(Estonia) Rimo Hunt	Kaisar	8
8	(Kazakhstan) Aslan Darabayev	Kairat	8
8	(Ukraine) Oleksiy Antonov	Aktobe	8
8	(Armenia) Marcos Pizzelli	Aktobe	8

=== Hat-tricks ===
Player	For	Against	Result	Date
(Bulgaria) Atanas Kurdov	Astana	Irtysh	4–3	19 April 2014
(Ivory Coast) Gerard Gohou	Kairat	Aktobe	7–1	6 July 2014
(Central African Republic) Foxi Kéthévoama	Astana	Atyrau	3–0	27 July 2014
(Ghana) Patrick Twumasi	Astana	Aktobe	6–1	4 October 2014

=== Scoring ===
- First goal of the season: Maksim Azovskiy for Spartak Semey against Tobol (15 March 2014)
- Fastest goal of the season: 2nd minute,
  - Edin Junuzović for Ordabasy against Aktobe (13 April 2014)
- Latest goal of the season: 94th minute,
  - Damir Kojašević for Astana against Kaisar (29 March 2014)
  - Dmitri Miroshnichenko for Aktobe against Kaisar (19 April 2014)

== Attendances ==
#	Club	Average
1	Kairat	7,706
2	Aktobe	6,906
3	Kaysar	4,000
4	Shakhter	3,575
5	Astana	3,488
6	Ordabasy	3,406
7	Taraz	3,172
8	Tobol	3,156
9	Altay	3,044
10	Atyrau	2,850
11	Zhetysu	2,719
12	Irtysh	2,700
