= 2016 FC Taraz season =

FC Taraz
2016 season
- Manager: Evgeny Yarovenko (until 15 May); Yuriy Maksymov (from 15 May)
- Stadium: Central Stadium
- Kazakhstan Premier League: 11th
- Kazakhstan Cup: Last 16 vs Okzhetpes
- Top goalscorer: League: Malick Mané (13); All: Malick Mané (13)
Home colours	Away colours

The 2016 FC Taraz season is the eighth successive season that the club will play in the Kazakhstan Premier League, the highest tier of association football in Kazakhstan, and 23rd in total. Taraz will play in the Kazakhstan Premier League as well as the Kazakhstan Cup.

== Squad ==
As of 11 July 2016

Note: Flags indicate national team as defined under FIFA eligibility rules; some limited exceptions apply. Players may hold more than one non-FIFA nationality.

No.	Pos.	Nation	Player
1	GK	KAZ	Aleksandr Grigorenko
2	DF	KAZ	Daniyar Bayaliev
3	MF	KAZ	Abzal Taubay
4	DF	KAZ	Ilya Vorotnikov
7	MF	KAZ	Alisher Suley
8	MF	KAZ	Vitali Yevstigneyev
9	MF	KAZ	Sherkhan Bauyrzhan
10	MF	KAZ	Bauyrzhan Baitana
11	FW	SEN	Malick Mané
12	DF	ROU	Ioan Mera
13	MF	KAZ	Kanat Karimolla
15	MF	KAZ	Ardak Karpyk
19	DF	KAZ	Dmitri Yevstigneyev

No.	Pos.	Nation	Player
20	DF	KAZ	Maksat Amirkhanov
22	DF	KAZ	Madiyar Nuraly
23	MF	KAZ	Kurmet Karaman
25	MF	KAZ	Taras Danilyuk
67	FW	UKR	Andriy Yakovlyev
70	GK	KAZ	Kirill Korotkevich
71	MF	KAZ	Daurenbek Tazhimbetov
75	FW	UKR	Oleksandr Pyschur
84	DF	TJK	Davron Ergashev
85	DF	RUS	Anton Grigoryev
99	DF	KAZ	Aleksandr Kirov
—	MF	KAZ	Farukh Mirsalimbaev
—	FW	KAZ	Denis Andreev

=== Reserve team ===
Note: Flags indicate national team as defined under FIFA eligibility rules; some limited exceptions apply. Players may hold more than one non-FIFA nationality.

No.	Pos.	Nation	Player
28	MF	KAZ	Nurdaulet Seidikhanov
29	MF	KAZ	Bakdaulet Daribayev
31	MF	KAZ	Zhambyl Moldashbayev
32	MF	KAZ	Ruslan Islamov
34	MF	KAZ	Meirzhan Balken
35	MF	KAZ	Dauren Amirkhanov

No.	Pos.	Nation	Player
36	MF	KAZ	Sundet Barat
37	MF	KAZ	Dinmukhamed Oralov
38	MF	KAZ	Mukhamedzhan Baimakhanov
39	MF	KAZ	Yelzhan Toktybayev
—	DF	KAZ	Vitali Kachagin
—	FW	KAZ	Yerbol Ondashev

== Transfers ==
=== Winter ===
In: Note: Flags indicate national team as defined under FIFA eligibility rules; some limited exceptions apply. Players may hold more than one non-FIFA nationality.

No.	Pos.	Nation	Player
6	MF	KAZ	Marat Shakhmetov (from (Kazakhstan) Zhetysu)
8	MF	KAZ	Vitali Yevstigneyev
10	FW	KAZ	Bauyrzhan Baitana (from (Kazakhstan) Kairat)
13	FW	SEN	Malick Mané (from (Sweden) IFK Göteborg)
14	DF	KAZ	Berik Aitbayev (from (Kazakhstan) Atyrau)
16	GK	SRB	Dušan Đokić
17	DF	KAZ	Oleg Nedashkovsky (from (Kazakhstan) Tobol)
78	FW	BLR	Ihar Zyankovich (from (Kazakhstan) Tobol)
—	MF	KAZ	Farukh Mirsalimbaev (from (Kazakhstan) Bayterek)
—	FW	KAZ	Denis Andreev (from (Kazakhstan) CSKA Almaty)

Out: Note: Flags indicate national team as defined under FIFA eligibility rules; some limited exceptions apply. Players may hold more than one non-FIFA nationality.

No.	Pos.	Nation	Player
3	MF	UKR	Dmytro Bashlay (to (Ukraine) Olimpik Donetsk)
7	MF	KAZ	Eduard Sergienko (to (Kazakhstan) Akzhayik)
9	FW	KAZ	Sanat Zhumahanov (to (Kazakhstan) Okzhetpes)
13	FW	NGR	Izu Azuka (to (Turkey) Yeni Malatyaspor)
14	DF	UKR	Denys Vasilyev
17	FW	UKR	Oleksandr Pyschur (to (Uzbekistan) Metallurg Bekabad)
23	MF	KAZ	Timur Dosmagambetov (to (Kazakhstan) Tobol)
24	GK	KAZ	Dzhurakhon Babakhanov (to (Kazakhstan) Okzhetpes)
27	FW	UKR	Oleksandr Yarovenko (to (Autonomous Republic of Crimea) Rubin Yalta)
30	MF	KAZ	Evgeniy Averchenko (to (Kazakhstan) Kyzylzhar)
71	MF	RUS	Alan Gatagov (to (Estonia) Levadia Tallinn)
77	MF	RUS	Almir Mukhutdinov (to (Kazakhstan) Tobol)
—	MF	NED	Desley Ubbink (to (Kazakhstan) Shakhter Karagandy)

=== Summer ===
In: Note: Flags indicate national team as defined under FIFA eligibility rules; some limited exceptions apply. Players may hold more than one non-FIFA nationality.

No.	Pos.	Nation	Player
67	FW	UKR	Andriy Yakovlyev (from (Ukraine) Zaria Bălți)
70	GK	KAZ	Kirill Korotkevich (from (Kazakhstan) Ordabasy)
71	MF	KAZ	Daurenbek Tazhimbetov (from (Kazakhstan) Ordabasy)
75	FW	UKR	Oleksandr Pyschur (from (Uzbekistan) Navbahor Namangan)
84	MF	TJK	Davron Ergashev (from (Tajikistan) Istiklol)
85	DF	RUS	Anton Grigoryev
88	MF	UKR	Oleksandr Aliyev (from (Ukraine) Katandzaro Kyiv)
99	FW	KAZ	Aleksandr Kirov (from (Kazakhstan) Irtysh Pavlodar)

Out: Note: Flags indicate national team as defined under FIFA eligibility rules; some limited exceptions apply. Players may hold more than one non-FIFA nationality.

No.	Pos.	Nation	Player
5	MF	SRB	Jovan Golić
6	MF	KAZ	Marat Shakhmetov (to (Kazakhstan) Akzhayik)
14	DF	KAZ	Berik Aitbayev (to (Kazakhstan) Atyrau)
16	GK	SRB	Dušan Đokić
17	MF	KAZ	Oleg Nedashkovsky
21	MF	KAZ	Bakhytzhan Rymtaev
44	MF	KAZ	Adilet Abdenabi
78	FW	BLR	Ihar Zyankovich
88	MF	UKR	Oleksandr Aliyev

== Friendlies ==
6 February 2016	Istiklol (Tajikistan)	2 – 2	(Kazakhstan) Taraz	Antalya, Turkey
(UTC+5)	Nazarov 7' (pen.); Dzhalilov 56' (red card) 82'; Fatkhuloev (red card) 88'	Summary	Rymtaev 19'; Shakhmetov 85'

10 February 2016	Jagodina (Serbia)	2 – 1	(Kazakhstan) Taraz	Antalya, Turkey
(UTC+5)	Goal	[ Summary]	Zyankovich

== Competitions ==
=== Kazakhstan Premier League ===
==== Regular season ====
===== Results summary =====
Overall								Home						Away					
Pld	W	D	L	GF	GA	GD	Pts	W	D	L	GF	GA	GD	W	D	L	GF	GA	GD
22	5	4	13	22	30	−8	19	3	2	6	11	15	−4	2	2	7	11	15	−4

Last updated: 25 July 2016.
Source: See Results

===== Results by round =====
Round	1	2	3	4	5	6	7	8	9	10	11	12	13	14	15	16	17	18	19	20	21	22
Ground	H	H	H	A	H	A	H	A	H	A	A	A	A	H	A	H	A	H	A	H	A	A
Result	W	D	L	L	L	L	D	L	L	L	L	D	D	L	L	L	L	W	W	W	W	L
Position	3	4	6	8	9	10	10	12	12	12	12	12	12	12	12	12	12	12	11	11	10	11

Source: See results
A = Away; H = Home; W = Win; D = Draw; L = Loss

===== Results =====
12 March 2016 1	Taraz	2 – 1	Kairat	Taraz
15:00 (UTC+6)	B.Baitana (yellow card) 40'; Zyankovich 65'; Golić (yellow card) 77'; T.Danilyuk 86'; Grigorenko (yellow card) 87'	Summary	V.Li 88'	Stadium: Central Stadium; Attendance: 1,500; Referee: Igor Chesnokov

19 March 2016 2	Taraz	1 – 1	Aktobe	Taraz
16:00 (UTC+6)	Golić (yellow card) 23'; Mera (yellow card) 38'; Zyankovich 45'; O.Nedashkovsky (red card) 69'	Summary	Smakov 11' (pen.); B.Kairov (yellow card) 69'; Sorokin (yellow card) 74'; Azovskiy (yellow card) 77'; Kouadja (yellow card) 88'	Stadium: Central Stadium; Attendance: 6,500; Referee: Aleksandr Gauzer

3 April 2016 3	Taraz	1 – 3	Okzhetpes	Taraz
16:00 (UTC+6)	M.Amirkhanov (yellow card) 37'; Shakhmetov 44'	Summary	Buleshev 25' (pen.); Nane (yellow card) 43'; Chertov (yellow card) 50'; Kozhamberdi (yellow card) 55'; Chichulin 75'; S.N'Ganbe 78'	Stadium: Central Stadium; Attendance: 2,500; Referee: Aydin Rakhimbayev

9 April 2016 4	Astana	2 – 1	Taraz	Astana
15:00 (UTC+6)	Nusserbayev 21'; Shomko 81'; Cañas (yellow card) 90+2'	Summary	Zyankovich 48'; D.Bayaliev (yellow card) 56'; K.Karaman (yellow card) 70'	Stadium: Astana Arena; Attendance: 2,358; Referee: Denis Tevyashov

13 April 2016 5	Taraz	0 – 1	Akzhayik	Taraz
18:00 (UTC+6)	M.Amirkhanov (yellow card) 58'; T.Danilyuk (yellow card) 60'; Vorotnikov (yellow card) 71'; B.Baitana (yellow card) 72'	Summary	A.Shurygin (yellow card) 49'; Z.Korobov (yellow card) 53'; K.Begalin 81'	Stadium: Central Stadium; Attendance: 3,500; Referee: Igor Aleshin

17 April 2016 6	Zhetysu	2 – 1	Taraz	Taldykorgan
15:00 (UTC+6)	Savić 47'; Rudzik (yellow card) 60'; Mojsov 90+1' (yellow card) 90+1'	Summary	M.Amirkhanov (yellow card) 24'; Mané 65'; Shakhmetov (yellow card) 89'	Stadium: Zhetysu Stadium; Attendance: 1,200; Referee: Artyom Kuchin

23 April 2016 7	Taraz	0 – 0	Atyrau	Taraz
17:00 (UTC+6)		Summary	Muldarov (yellow card) 70'	Stadium: Central Stadium; Attendance: 3,500; Referee: Bolat Karlibayev

1 May 2016 8	Tobol	1 – 0	Taraz	Kostanay
16:00 (UTC+6)	Dosmagambetov (yellow card) 53'; N'Diaye 90+4' (yellow card) 90+5'	Summary	Vorotnikov (yellow card) 42'; Shakhmetov (yellow card) 55'; D.Yevstigneyev (yellow card) 82'; Grigorenko (yellow card) 89'; D.Bayaliev (yellow card) 90+3'	Stadium: Central Stadium; Attendance: 3,000; Referee: Ruslan Duzmambetov

5 May 2016 9	Taraz	1 – 2	Shakhter Karagandy	Taraz
18:00 (UTC+6)	D.Yevstigneyev (yellow card) 86'; B.Baitana 90+3'	Summary	K.Ermekov (yellow card) 51'; Szöke (yellow card) 56'; A.Nurybekov (yellow card) 61'; Skorykh 71'; Finonchenko 76'	Stadium: Central Stadium; Attendance: 4,200; Referee: Marat Iskakov

9 May 2016 10	Irtysh Pavlodar	2 – 1	Taraz	Pavlodar
18:00 (UTC+6)	R.Murtazayev 16'; Malyi (yellow card) 20'; Akhmetov (yellow card) 52'; Fall 56'	Summary	Vorotnikov (yellow card) 29'; K.Karaman (yellow card) 31'; Mané 34'	Stadium: Central Stadium; Attendance: 6,500; Referee: Timur Kumashev

14 May 2016 11	Taraz	1 – 2	Ordabasy	Taraz
18:00 (UTC+6)	V.Yevstigneyev (yellow card) 24'; Shakhmetov (yellow card) 76'; Mané 85'	Summary	Abdulin (yellow card) 20'; Kasalica 21', 29'; B.Kozhabayev (yellow card) 81'	Stadium: Central Stadium; Attendance: 4,300; Referee: Sergey Gorokhovodatskiy

21 May 2016 12	Aktobe	2 – 2	Taraz	Aktobe
20:00 (UTC+6)	Smakov 44' (pen.); D.Zhalmukan 45+1'; Tsveiba (yellow card) 57'; Tleshev (yellow card) 90+4'	Summary	Mera (yellow card) 5'; V.Yevstigneyev (yellow card) 30' (goal) 38'; Grigorenko (yellow card) 42'; Mané 50'; B.Baitana (yellow card) 90+6'	Stadium: Central Stadium; Attendance: 5,000; Referee: Igor Chesnokov

29 May 2016 13	Okzhetpes	0 – 0	Taraz	Astana
18:00 (UTC+6)	Chertov (yellow card) 40' (yellow-red card) 85'	Summary	B.Baitana (yellow card) 28'; O.Nedashkovsky (yellow card) 81'; A.Taubay (yellow card) 90'	Stadium: Astana Arena; Attendance: 1,500; Referee: Akmalkhan Kholmatov

2 June 2016 14	Taraz	0 – 2	Astana	Taraz
17:00 (UTC+6)	M.Nuraly (yellow card) 39'; V.Yevstigneyev (yellow card) 73'	Summary	Postnikov (yellow card) 12'; Shomko (yellow card) 39'; Aničić (yellow card) 77'; Despotović 88'; Muzhikov 90'	Stadium: Central Stadium; Attendance: 3,500; Referee: Artyom Kuchin

11 June 2016 15	Akzhayik	2 – 1	Taraz	Oral
19:30 (UTC+6)	Nikolić (yellow card) 12'; Coronel 16', 54'; R.Rozybakiev (yellow card) 43'; Lečić (yellow card) 57'	Summary	Yevstigneyev (yellow card) 15'; Vorotnikov (yellow card) 16'; T.Danilyuk (yellow card) 27'; A.Taubay (yellow card) 40'; Mera (yellow card) 57'; D.Bayaliev (yellow card) 59'; Aliyev 75'; Grigoryev (yellow card) 90+3'	Stadium: Petr Atoyan Stadium; Attendance: 2,500; Referee: Aleksandr Aliyev

15 June 2016 16	Taraz	2 – 3	Zhetysu	Taraz
19:00 (UTC+6)	M.Nuraly (yellow card) 23'; T.Danilyuk (yellow card) 31'; Mera (yellow card) 52' (goal) 90'; B.Baitana (yellow card) 82' (yellow-red card) 90+2'; S.Bauyrzhan (yellow card) 82'; Mané 84'	Summary	Savić 28', 53', 67'; A.Pasechenko (yellow card) 58'; Đalović (yellow card) 82'	Stadium: Central Stadium; Attendance: 2,000; Referee: Furkat Atajanow

19 June 2016 17	Atyrau	1 – 0	Taraz	Atyrau
20:00 (UTC+6)	Damčevski 57'; Arzhanov (yellow card) 76'	Summary	K.Karaman (yellow card) 29'	Stadium: Munaishy Stadium; Attendance: 5,000; Referee: Marat Iskakov

25 June 2016 18	Taraz	2 – 0	Tobol	Taraz
19:00 (UTC+6)	Ergashev (yellow card) 17'; Tazhimbetov 29'; Mané (yellow card) 29' (goal) 79'; A.Taubay (yellow card) 72'; Grigoryev (yellow card) 76'	Summary	Yavorskyi (yellow card) 22'; Mukhutdinov (yellow card) 63'; D.Miroshnichenko (yellow card) 72'	Stadium: Central Stadium; Attendance: 3,000; Referee: Denis Izmailov

2 July 2016 19	Shakhter Karagandy	0 – 1	Taraz	Karaganda
17:00 ALMT (UTC+6)	Szöke (yellow card) 59'	Summary	Mané 33'; Grigoryev (yellow card) 87'	Stadium: Shakhter Stadium; Attendance: 2,000; Referee: Aleksandr Gauzer

9 July 2016 20	Taraz	1 – 0	Irtysh Pavlodar	Taraz
19:00 (UTC+6)	Mera 40'; Grigoryev (yellow card) 51'; A.Taubay (yellow card) 60'; Kirov (yellow card) 76'; Ergashev (yellow card) 90+2'	Summary	Freidgeimas (yellow card) 7'; Aliev (yellow card) 21'; Jirsák (yellow card) 23'; R.Yesimov (yellow card) 27'; D.Dautov (yellow card) 90'	Stadium: Central Stadium; Attendance: 4,000; Referee: Denis Tevyashov

17 July 2016 21	Ordabasy	0 – 3	Taraz	Shymkent
18:30 (UTC+6)	M.Tolebek (yellow card) 70'	Summary	Yakovlyev 4' (yellow card) 76'; A.Suley 13', 40'; D.Yevstigneyev (yellow card) 90+2'	Stadium: Kazhymukan Munaitpasov Stadium; Attendance: 3,500; Referee: Bolat Karlibayev

24 July 2016 22	Kairat	3 – 1	Taraz	Almaty
20:00 (UTC+6)	Islamkhan 10'; Arshavin 41'; Marković (yellow card) 56'; Kuat (yellow card) 84'; Gohou 90+3'	Summary	Mera (yellow card) 9'; Tazhimbetov 19'	Stadium: Central Stadium; Attendance: 7,500; Referee: Marat Iskakov

===== League table =====
Pos	Team	Pld	W	D	L	GF	GA	GD	Pts	Qualification
8	Tobol	22	8	4	10	28	26	+2	28 (Note: Head-to-head record: Aktobe (7 points), Atyrau (5 points), Tobol (4 points).)	Qualification for the relegation round
9	Zhetysu	22	6	5	11	22	32	−10	23	Qualification for the relegation round
10	Shakhter Karagandy	22	5	6	11	10	27	−17	21	Qualification for the relegation round
11	Taraz	22	5	4	13	22	30	−8	19	Qualification for the relegation round
12	Akzhayik	22	3	2	17	12	44	−32	11	Qualification for the relegation round

Source: UEFA.com, Soccerway
Rules for classification: 1) Points; 2) Head-to-head points; 3) Head-to-head matches won; 4) Head-to-head goal difference; 5) Head-to-head goals scored; 6) Head-to-head away goals scored; 7) Goal difference; 8) Matches won; 9) Goals scored; 10) Away goals scored; 11) Draw.

==== Relegation round ====
===== Results summary =====
Overall								Home						Away					
Pld	W	D	L	GF	GA	GD	Pts	W	D	L	GF	GA	GD	W	D	L	GF	GA	GD
10	5	1	4	11	10	+1	16	5	0	0	10	3	+7	0	1	4	1	7	−6

Last updated: 1 November 2016.
Source: See Results

===== Results by round =====
Round	1	2	3	4	5	6	7	8	9	10
Ground	A	H	A	H	A	A	H	A	H	H
Result	L	W	L	W	L	L	W	D	W	W
Position	11	11	11	11	12	12	11	12	11	11

Source: See results
A = Away; H = Home; W = Win; D = Draw; L = Loss

===== Results =====
14 August 2016 1	Shakhter Karagandy	1 – 0	Taraz	Karaganda
18:00 (UTC+6)	Ubbink 66'	Summary	Mera (yellow card) 83'	Stadium: Shakhter Stadium; Attendance: 2,000; Referee: Sergey Gorokhovodatskiy

21 August 2016 2	Taraz	1 – 0	Atyrau	Taraz
19:00 (UTC+6)	Mera (yellow card) 27'; Mané 70'; A.Taubay (yellow card) 83'	Summary	Muldarov (yellow card) 75'	Stadium: Central Stadium; Attendance: 2,800; Referee: Bolat Karlibayev

26 August 2016 3	Akzhayik	2 – 0	Taraz	Oral
19:00 (UTC+6)	B.Omarov (yellow card) 35'; Dudchenko 55' (yellow card) 72'; Lečić 80'	Summary	Mera (yellow card) 39'; Ergashev (yellow card) 56'	Stadium: Petr Atoyan Stadium; Attendance: 2,000; Referee: Ruslan Duzmambetov

10 September 2016 4	Taraz	3 – 2	Zhetysu	Taraz
19:00 (UTC+6)	Mané 2', 16' (pen.), 48'; A.Taubay (yellow card) 18'; Vorotnikov (yellow card) 22'; A.Suley (yellow card) 80'	Summary	S.Sagyndykov (yellow card) 25'; V.Borovskiy 28'; Wague (yellow card) 39' (yellow-red card) 90'; Zhangylyshbay 43'; Klein (yellow card) 78'	Stadium: Central Stadium; Attendance: 4,000; Referee: Aleksandr Aliyev

18 September 2016 5	Tobol	3 – 1	Taraz	Kostanay
19:00 (UTC+6)	Glavina 39'; Šimkovič 53' (pen.); Khizhnichenko (yellow card) 81'; Asildarov 88'	Summary	Yakovlyev 2'; T.Danilyuk (yellow card) 53'	Stadium: Central Stadium; Attendance: 1,500; Referee: Denis Tevyashov

25 September 2016 6	Atyrau	1 – 0	Taraz	Atyrau
16:00 (UTC+6)	Curtean 63'; V.Chureyev (yellow card) 73'	Summary	Ergashev (yellow card) 24'; Vorotnikov (yellow card) 41'; D.Yevstigneyev (yellow card) 77'	Stadium: Munaishy Stadium; Attendance: 2,000; Referee: Furkhat Atazhanov

1 October 2016 7	Taraz	2 – 1	Akzhayik	Taraz
18:00 (UTC+6)	Mané 19' (pen.); Tazhimbetov (yellow card) 30'; Yakovlyev (yellow card) 45+1'; Pyshchur (yellow card) 49'; Mera (yellow card) 60'; A.Suley 90+1'	Summary	Sergienko (yellow card) 45+1'; I.Antipov (yellow card) 68'; Lečić (yellow card) 73'; Shakhmetov 87'	Stadium: Central Stadium; Attendance: 3,000; Referee: Artyom Kuchin

16 October 2016 8	Zhetysu	0 – 0	Taraz	Taldykorgan
16:30 (UTC+6)	Klein (yellow card) 54'; Beglaryan (yellow card) 87'; Zhangylyshbay (yellow card) 90+1'	Summary	Yevstigneyev (yellow card) 54'; Pyschur (yellow card) 54'; Tazhimbetov (yellow card) 54'; Mané (yellow card) 87'; A.Taubay (yellow card) 87'; Yakovlyev (yellow card) 90'	Stadium: Zhetysu Stadium; Attendance: 1,200; Referee: Denis Tevyashov

22 October 2016 9	Taraz	2 – 1	Tobol	Taraz
15:00 (UTC+6)	Mané 20'; Mera 23'; A.Taubay (yellow card) 72'; Grigoryev (yellow card) 79'	Summary	R.Jalilov (yellow card) 42'; Khizhnichenko (yellow card) 47'; Mukhutdinov (yellow card) 58'; Deac 88'	Stadium: Central Stadium; Attendance: 2,500; Referee: Grigory Moskovchenko

29 October 2016 10	Taraz	2 – 1	Shakhter Karagandy	Taraz
15:00 (UTC+6)	Ergashev 54'; Kirov 77'; Mera (yellow card) 90+1'	Summary	Ubbink 73'; G.Dubkov (yellow card) 86'	Stadium: Central Stadium; Attendance: 2,800; Referee: Aydin Rakhimbayev

===== League table =====
Pos	Team	Pld	W	D	L	GF	GA	GD	Pts	Relegation
7	Tobol	32	12	5	15	40	40	0	41	
8	Atyrau	32	10	9	13	35	39	−4	39	
9	Shakhter Karagandy	32	10	6	16	25	40	−15	36	
10	Akzhayik	32	11	2	19	27	50	−23	35 (Note: Head-to-head record; Taraz–Akzhayik 0–1, Akzhayik–Taraz 2–1, Akzhayik–Taraz 2–0, Taraz–Akzhayik 2–1.)	
11	Taraz	32	10	5	17	33	42	−9	35	Qualification for the relegation play-offs (Note: Despite finishing 11th and losing the relegation playoffs, Taraz were readmitted because only one team was given a license.)
12	Zhetysu (R)	32	8	7	17	37	53	−16	31	Relegation to the Kazakhstan First Division

Source: Soccerway
Rules for classification: 1) Points; 2) Head-to-head points; 3) Head-to-head matches won; 4) Head-to-head goal difference; 5) Head-to-head goals scored; 6) Head-to-head away goals scored; 7) Goal difference; 8) Matches won; 9) Goals scored; 10) Away goals scored; 11) Draw.
(R) Relegated

==== Relegation play-off ====
5 November 2016	Taraz	0 – 3	Altai Semey	Astana
14:00 (UTC+6)	T.Danilyuk (yellow card) 38'; A.Taubay (yellow card) 66'	Summary	Shakin 4'; Dimov (yellow card) 28'; Karpovich (yellow card) 40'; Shaff 45' (pen.); Nurgaliyev 51'	Stadium: Astana Arena; Attendance: 2,500; Referee: Artyom Kuchin

=== Kazakhstan Cup ===
27 April 2016 Last 16	Okzhetpes	2 – 1	Taraz	Kokshetau
20:00 (UTC+6)	Bogdanov (yellow card) 36'; Khairullin 45', 90'; Chichulin (red card) 79'; Chertov (yellow card) 81'; Chyzhov (yellow card) 88'	Summary	A.Abdenabi (yellow card) 19'; D.Yevstigneyev (yellow card) 70'; A.Suley 75'; D.Bayaliev (yellow card) 80'; K.Karaman (yellow card) 81'	Stadium: Okzhetpes Stadium; Attendance: 1,000; Referee: Furkat Atajanow

== Squad statistics ==
As of Match played 5 November 2016

=== Appearances and goals ===
No.	Pos	Nat	Player	Total		Premier League		Playoff		Kazakhstan Cup	
No.	Pos	Nat	Player	Apps	Goals	Apps	Goals	Apps	Goals	Apps	Goals
1	GK	(Kazakhstan) KAZ	Aleksandr Grigorenko	30	0	30	0	0	0	0	0
2	DF	(Kazakhstan) KAZ	Daniyar Bayaliev	16	0	12+3	0	0	0	1	0
3	MF	(Kazakhstan) KAZ	Abzal Taubay	20	0	11+8	0	1	0	0	0
4	DF	(Kazakhstan) KAZ	Ilya Vorotnikov	28	0	27+1	0	0	0	0	0
7	MF	(Kazakhstan) KAZ	Alisher Suley	31	4	20+9	3	1	0	0+1	1
8	MF	(Kazakhstan) KAZ	Vitali Yevstigneyev	13	1	8+4	1	0	0	1	0
9	MF	(Kazakhstan) KAZ	Sherkhan Bauyrzhan	3	0	0+3	0	0	0	0	0
10	MF	(Kazakhstan) KAZ	Bauyrzhan Baitana	15	1	11+4	1	0	0	0	0
11	FW	(Senegal) SEN	Malick Mané	31	13	30	13	1	0	0	0
12	DF	(Romania) ROU	Ioan Mera	26	3	24+1	3	1	0	0	0
13	MF	(Kazakhstan) KAZ	Kanat Karimolla	3	0	0+2	0	0	0	1	0
15	MF	(Kazakhstan) KAZ	Ardak Karpyk	3	0	1+2	0	0	0	0	0
19	DF	(Kazakhstan) KAZ	Dmitri Yevstigneyev	21	0	14+5	0	0+1	0	0+1	0
20	DF	(Kazakhstan) KAZ	Maksat Amirkhanov	17	0	9+6	0	0+1	0	1	0
22	DF	(Kazakhstan) KAZ	Madiyar Nuraly	18	0	9+8	0	0+1	0	0	0
23	MF	(Kazakhstan) KAZ	Kurmet Karaman	9	0	7+1	0	0	0	1	0
25	MF	(Kazakhstan) KAZ	Taras Danilyuk	32	1	28+3	1	1	0	0	0
67	FW	(Ukraine) UKR	Andriy Yakovlyev	17	2	14+2	2	1	0	0	0
70	GK	(Kazakhstan) KAZ	Kirill Korotkevich	4	0	2+1	0	1	0	0	0
71	MF	(Kazakhstan) KAZ	Daurenbek Tazhimbetov	16	2	15	2	1	0	0	0
75	FW	(Ukraine) UKR	Oleksandr Pyschur	12	0	9+2	0	1	0	0	0
84	DF	(Tajikistan) TJK	Davron Ergashev	14	1	14	1	0	0	0	0
85	DF	(Russia) RUS	Anton Grigoryev	16	0	14+1	0	1	0	0	0
99	DF	(Kazakhstan) KAZ	Aleksandr Kirov	14	1	13	1	1	0	0	0
	DF	(Kazakhstan) KAZ	Adilet Kenesbek	1	0	0	0	0	0	1	0
	MF	(Kazakhstan) KAZ	Alibek Satybaldy	1	0	0	0	0	0	1	0
Players away from Taraz on loan:
Players who appeared for Taraz that left during the season:
5	MF	(Serbia) SRB	Jovan Golić	2	0	2	0	0	0	0	0
6	MF	(Kazakhstan) KAZ	Marat Shakhmetov	15	1	11+4	1	0	0	0	0
14	DF	(Kazakhstan) KAZ	Berik Aitbayev	11	0	6+5	0	0	0	0	0
16	GK	(Serbia) SRB	Dušan Đokić	1	0	0	0	0	0	1	0
17	MF	(Kazakhstan) KAZ	Oleg Nedashkovsky	5	0	3+2	0	0	0	0	0
21	MF	(Kazakhstan) KAZ	Bakhytzhan Rymtaev	6	0	1+4	0	0	0	1	0
32	DF	(Kazakhstan) KAZ	Marat Togyzbay	1	0	0	0	0	0	1	0
44	MF	(Kazakhstan) KAZ	Adilet Abdenabi	3	0	0+2	0	0	0	1	0
78	FW	(Belarus) BLR	Ihar Zyankovich	6	3	6	3	0	0	0	0
88	MF	(Ukraine) UKR	Oleksandr Aliyev	9	1	3+6	1	0	0	0	0

=== Goal scorers ===
Place	Position	Nation	Number	Name	Premier League	Playoff	Kazakhstan Cup	Total
1	FW	(Senegal)	13	Malick Mané	13	0	0	13
2	MF	(Kazakhstan)	7	Alisher Suley	3	0	1	4
3	FW	(Belarus)	78	Ihar Zyankovich	3	0	0	3
3	DF	(Romania)	12	Ioan Mera	3	0	0	3
5	FW	(Kazakhstan)	71	Daurenbek Tazhimbetov	2	0	0	2
5	MF	(Ukraine)	67	Andriy Yakovlyev	2	0	0	2
7	MF	(Kazakhstan)	25	Taras Danilyuk	1	0	0	1
7	MF	(Kazakhstan)	6	Marat Shakhmetov	1	0	0	1
7	MF	(Kazakhstan)	10	Bauyrzhan Baitana	1	0	0	1
7	MF	(Kazakhstan)	8	Vitali Yevstigneyev	1	0	0	1
7	MF	(Ukraine)	88	Oleksandr Aliyev	1	0	0	1
7	DF	(Tajikistan)	84	Davron Ergashev	1	0	0	1
7	DF	(Kazakhstan)	99	Aleksandr Kirov	1	0	0	1
				TOTALS	33	0	1	34

=== Disciplinary record ===
Number	Nation	Position	Name	Premier League		Playoffs		Kazakhstan Cup		Total	
Number	Nation	Position	Name	Yellow card	Red card	Yellow card	Red card	Yellow card	Red card	Yellow card	Red card
1	(Kazakhstan)	GK	Aleksandr Grigorenko	3	0	0	0	0	0	3	0
2	(Kazakhstan)	DF	Daniyar Bayaliev	3	0	0	0	1	0	4	0
3	(Kazakhstan)	MF	Abzal Taubay	7	0	1	0	0	0	8	0
4	(Kazakhstan)	DF	Ilya Vorotnikov	6	0	0	0	0	0	6	0
5	(Serbia)	MF	Jovan Golić	2	0	0	0	0	0	2	0
6	(Kazakhstan)	MF	Marat Shakhmetov	3	0	0	0	0	0	3	0
7	(Kazakhstan)	MF	Alisher Suley	1	0	0	0	0	0	1	0
8	(Kazakhstan)	MF	Vitali Yevstigneyev	5	0	0	0	0	0	5	0
9	(Kazakhstan)	MF	Sherkhan Bauyrzhan	1	0	0	0	0	0	1	0
10	(Kazakhstan)	MF	Bauyrzhan Baitana	6	1	0	0	0	0	6	1
12	(Romania)	DF	Ioan Mera	10	0	0	0	0	0	10	0
13	(Senegal)	FW	Malick Mané	2	0	0	0	0	0	2	0
17	(Kazakhstan)	MF	Oleg Nedashkovsky	1	1	0	0	0	0	1	1
19	(Kazakhstan)	MF	Dmitri Yevstigneyev	4	0	0	0	1	0	5	0
20	(Kazakhstan)	DF	Maksat Amirkhanov	3	0	0	0	0	0	3	0
22	(Kazakhstan)	DF	Madiyar Nuraly	2	0	0	0	0	0	2	0
23	(Kazakhstan)	MF	Kurmet Karaman	3	0	0	0	1	0	4	0
25	(Kazakhstan)	MF	Taras Danilyuk	4	0	1	0	0	0	5	0
44	(Kazakhstan)	MF	Adilet Abdenabi	0	0	0	0	1	0	1	0
67	(Ukraine)	FW	Andriy Yakovlyev	3	0	0	0	0	0	3	0
71	(Kazakhstan)	MF	Daurenbek Tazhimbetov	2	0	0	0	0	0	2	0
75	(Ukraine)	FW	Oleksandr Pyschur	2	0	0	0	0	0	2	0
84	(Tajikistan)	DF	Davron Ergashev	4	0	0	0	0	0	4	0
85	(Russia)	DF	Anton Grigoryev	5	0	0	0	0	0	5	0
99	(Kazakhstan)	DF	Aleksandr Kirov	1	0	0	0	0	0	1	0
			TOTALS	84	2	2	0	4	0	90	2
