= Barroilhet =

Barroilhet is a surname. Notable people with the surname include:

- Gonzalo Barroilhet (born 1986), Chilean decathlete
- Jordan Barroilhet (born 1998), French footballer
- Paul Barroilhet (1810–1871), French opera singer
- Richard Barroilhet (born 1992), English-born French footballer
