= Ilya Vorotnikov (footballer, born 1986) =

Kazakhstani footballer

Personal information
- Full name: Ilya Vorotnikov
- Date of birth: 1 February 1986 (age 40)
- Place of birth: Almaty, Kazakh SSR
- Height: 1.86 m (6 ft 1 in)
- Position: Centre back

Team information
- Current team: Caspiy
- Number: 33

Senior career*
| Years | Team | Apps | (Gls) |
| 2005 | Irtysh Pavlodar | 3 | (0) |
| 2006–2008 | Alma-Ata | 67 | (0) |
| 2009–2010 | Atyrau | 53 | (0) |
| 2011–2012 | Kairat | 38 | (0) |
| 2013 | Akzhayik | 14 | (0) |
| 2013–2016 | Taraz | 88 | (4) |
| 2017 | Irtysh | 14 | (1) |
| 2017–2018 | Taraz | | |
| 2019– | Caspiy | | |

International career^{‡}
| 2014– | Kazakhstan | 6 | (0) |
- * Club domestic league appearances and goals as of 14:39, 6 June 2019 (UTC) ‡ National team caps and goals as of 11 February 2016

Ilya Vorotnikov (born 1 February 1986) is a Kazakh footballer who plays as a centre back for FC Caspiy and has been a former international for Kazakhstan.

== Career statistics ==
=== Club ===
As of match played 28 October 2017

Appearances and goals by club, season and competition
| Club | Season | League | | | National Cup | | Continental | | Other | | Total | |
| Club | Season | Division | Apps | Goals | Apps | Goals | Apps | Goals | Apps | Goals | Apps | Goals |
|---|---|---|---|---|---|---|---|---|---|---|---|---|
| Irtysh Pavlodar | 2005 | Kazakhstan Premier League | 3 | 0 | | | – | | – | | 3 | 0 |
| Alma-Ata | 2006 | Kazakhstan Premier League | 13 | 0 | | | - | | - | | 13 | 0 |
| Alma-Ata | 2007 | Kazakhstan Premier League | 26 | 0 | | | - | | - | | 26 | 0 |
| Alma-Ata | 2008 | Kazakhstan Premier League | 28 | 0 | | | - | | - | | 28 | 0 |
| Alma-Ata | Total | | 67 | 0 | | | - | - | - | - | 67 | 0 |
| Atyrau | 2009 | Kazakhstan Premier League | 25 | 0 | | | - | | - | | 25 | 0 |
| Atyrau | 2010 | Kazakhstan Premier League | 28 | 0 | | | 2 | 0 | 1 | 0 | 31 | 0 |
| Atyrau | Total | | 53 | 0 | | | 2 | 0 | 1 | 0 | 56 | 0 |
| Kairat | 2011 | Kazakhstan Premier League | 22 | 0 | 2 | 0 | - | | - | | 24 | 0 |
| Kairat | 2012 | Kazakhstan Premier League | 16 | 0 | 1 | 0 | - | | - | | 17 | 0 |
| Kairat | Total | | 38 | 0 | 3 | 0 | - | - | - | - | 41 | 0 |
| Akzhayik | 2013 | Kazakhstan Premier League | 14 | 0 | 1 | 0 | – | | – | | 15 | 0 |
| Taraz | 2013 | Kazakhstan Premier League | 13 | 3 | 0 | 0 | - | | - | | 13 | 3 |
| Taraz | 2014 | Kazakhstan Premier League | 23 | 1 | 1 | 0 | - | | - | | 24 | 1 |
| Taraz | 2015 | Kazakhstan Premier League | 24 | 0 | 1 | 0 | - | | - | | 25 | 0 |
| Taraz | 2016 | Kazakhstan Premier League | 28 | 0 | 0 | 0 | - | | - | | 28 | 0 |
| Taraz | Total | | 88 | 4 | 2 | 0 | - | - | - | - | 90 | 4 |
| Irtysh Pavlodar | 2017 | Kazakhstan Premier League | 14 | 1 | 1 | 0 | – | | – | | 15 | 1 |
| Taraz | 2017 | Kazakhstan Premier League | 9 | 0 | 0 | 0 | – | | – | | 9 | 0 |
| Career total | | | 296 | 5 | 7 | 0 | 2 | 0 | 1 | 0 | 306 | 5 |

=== International ===
As of match played 28 March 2015

Kazakhstan national team
| Year | Apps | Goals |
|---|---|---|
| 2014 | 4 | 0 |
| 2015 | 2 | 0 |
| Total | 6 | 0 |

== Honours ==
Alma-Ata

- Kazakhstan Cup (1): 2006

Atyrau

- Kazakhstan Cup (1): 2009
