= Jordan Barroilhet =

French footballer (born 1998)

Personal information
- Full name: Jordan Barroilhet Bloomfield
- Date of birth: 23 January 1998 (age 28)
- Place of birth: Saint-Raphaël, France
- Height: 1.96 m (6 ft 5 in)
- Position: Defender

Senior career*
Years	Team	Apps	(Gls)
–2018	Montpellier B	22	(1)
2018–2019	Peralada	14	(0)
2019	Girona	0	(0)
2019–2020	Girona B	0	(0)
2020–2021	Puerto Montt	11	(0)
2021	Curicó Unido	3	(0)
2022–	AS Maximoise		
- * Club domestic league appearances and goals

Jordan Barroilhet Bloomfield (born 23 January 1998) is a French professional footballer who plays as a defender for AS Maximoise.

== Club career ==
Barroilhet started his career with French fifth tier side Montpellier B. In 2018, he signed for Peralada in the Spanish third tier. Before the 2020 season, Barroilhet signed for Chilean second-tier club Puerto Montt. In 2021, he signed for Curicó Unido in the Chilean top flight, where he made four appearances. On 4 April 2021, Barroilhet debuted for Curicó Unido in a 2–0 loss to La Serena.

== International career ==
He is eligible to represent Chile internationally through his father.

== Personal life ==
Barroilhet has two relatives who are professional footballers: his older brother, Richard, who came to Chile on 2017 to join Deportes Puerto Montt and his Chilean cousin Clemente Montes Barroilhet, who began his career playing for Universidad Católica.
