= Richard Barroilhet =

Footballer (born 1992)

Personal information
- Full name: Richard Michael Barroilhet
- Date of birth: 29 August 1992 (age 34)
- Place of birth: Westminster, England
- Height: 1.88 m (6 ft 2 in)
- Position: Forward

Youth career
- 1998–2004: AS Maximoise
- 2004–2008: Stade Raphaëlois
- 2008–2010: Nice
- 2010–2012: Fulham

Senior career*
Years	Team	Apps	(Gls)
2011–2012	Fulham	0	(0)
2011	→ VPS (loan)	7	(0)
2012–2013	RKC Waalwijk	0	(0)
2013–2014	Nuneaton Town	1	(0)
2014	Taraz	9	(0)
2014–2015	Fréjus Saint-Raphaël	8	(0)
2015–2016	Magreb '90	11	(0)
2017	Montpellier II	18	(2)
2017–2019	O'Higgins	0	(0)
2017	→ Barnechea (loan)	13	(6)
2018	→ Magallanes (loan)	29	(5)
2019	→ Puerto Montt (loan)	24	(4)
2020	Deportes Temuco	16	(1)
2021	U. de Concepción	23	(2)

International career
2011	France U19	3	(0)
- * Club domestic league appearances and goals as of 21 November 2021

Richard Michael Barroilhet (born 29 August 1992) is a professional footballer who plays as a forward. Born in England, he represented France at youth international level.

== Club career ==
Born in Westminster, England, but grew up in France, Barroilhet joined Nice, where he came through the youth system and after two years at the club, Barroilhet went to England, where he was invited to join Fulham youth system.

He was offered his first professional contract at Fulham and following injury he went on loan to Finnish side VPS to get some game time.

In July 2012, Barroilhet moved to RKC Waalwijk in the Eredivisie. After injury and treatment during 2013, Barroilhet joined Nuneaton Town in November 2013. Just 25 days after signing for Nuneaton Town, Barroilhet left the club. Barroilhet went on trial with FC Taraz of the Kazakhstan Premier League in January 2014, going on to sign for the club in March of the same year. In May, the Dutch manager Arno Piipers, who took some players including Barroilhet to Taraz for his project, was dismissed. At the beginning of June, following changes in management, conditions, playing time, Barroilhet negotiated a mutual release. Following play time in Fréjus Saint-Raphaël in France and Utrecht-based Magreb '90 side in the Netherlands, Barroilhet joined the reserves of Montpellier HSC.

In July 2017, Barroilhet joined Chilean Primera División side O'Higgins. In January 2020, after three loans spells, the forward joined Primera B de Chile side Deportes Temuco on a permanent deal.

== International career ==
Barroilhet was born in England to a Chilean father and English mother, and moved to France at a young age. Barroilhet has three caps for the France U-19 team.

== Personal life ==
He has two relatives who are professional footballers: his younger brother, Jordan, who came to Chile on 2020 to join Deportes Puerto Montt and his Chilean cousin Clemente Montes Barroilhet, who began his career playing for Universidad Católica.

== Career statistics ==
As of 1 July 2015

Appearances and goals by club, season and competition
Club	Season	League			Cup		Continental		Total	
Club	Season	Division	Apps	Goals	Apps	Goals	Apps	Goals	Apps	Goals
Fulham	2011–12	Premier League	0	0	0	0	–		0	0
VPS (loan)	2012	Veikkausliiga	7	0	0	0	–		7	0
RKC Waalwijk	2012–13	Eredivisie	0	0	0	0	–		0	0
Nuneaton Town	2013–14	Conference Premier	1	0	0	0	–		1	0
Taraz	2014	Kazakhstan Premier League	9	0	0	0	–		9	0
EFC Fréjus Saint-Raphaël	2014–15	Championnat National	8	0	1	0	–		9	0
Career total			25	0	1	0	0	0	26	0
