= Oleksandr Yarovenko =

Ukrainian footballer

Personal information
- Full name: Oleksandr Yevheniyovych Yarovenko
- Date of birth: 19 December 1987 (age 38)
- Place of birth: Alma-Ata, Soviet Union (now Kazakhstan)
- Height: 1.83 m (6 ft 0 in)
- Position: Forward

Team information
- Current team: VPK-Ahro Shevchenkivka
- Number: 7

Youth career
- 2001–2003: DYuSSh-12 Dnipropetrovsk
- 2004: Shakhtar Donetsk

Senior career*
| Years | Team | Apps | (Gls) |
| 2004–2006 | Shakhtar-3 Donetsk | 20 | (0) |
| 2006 | Shakhtar-2 Donetsk | 3 | (0) |
| 2006 | Kryvbas Kryvyi Rih | 0 | (0) |
| 2007–2008 | Esil Bogatyr | 24 | (0) |
| 2009 | Stal Dniprodzerzhynsk | 1 | (0) |
| 2009 | Dnipro-75 Dnipropetrovsk | 15 | (5) |
| 2010 | Helios Kharkiv | 14 | (1) |
| 2010–2011 | Tytan Armiansk | 44 | (4) |
| 2012–2013 | Naftovyk-Ukrnafta Okhtyrka | 56 | (9) |
| 2014–2015 | Taraz | 35 | (5) |
| 2016 | Rubin Yalta | 14 | (1) |
| 2017 | Sumy | 13 | (6) |
| 2017 | Kolos Kovalivka | 11 | (1) |
| 2018 | Mykolaiv | 2 | (0) |
| 2018–2019 | Metalurh Zaporizhzhia | 23 | (7) |
| 2019 | Kom | 2 | (0) |
| 2021 | Dinaz Vyshhorod | 3 | (0) |
| 2021– | VPK-Ahro Shevchenkivka | 7 | (0) |
- * Club domestic league appearances and goals as of 13 February 2022

Oleksandr Yevheniyovych Yarovenko (Ukrainian: Олександр Євгенійович Яровенко; born 19 December 1987) is a Ukrainian professional footballer who plays as a forward for Ukrainian club VPK-Ahro Shevchenkivka.

== Personal life ==
He is the son of football manager and former footballer Yevhen Yarovenko.
