= Evgeniy Averchenko =

Kazakh football midfielder (born 1982)

Personal information
- Full name: Evgeniy Nikolayevich Averchenko
- Date of birth: 6 April 1982 (age 44)
- Place of birth: Petropavl, Russian SFSR, Soviet Union
- Height: 1.72 m (5 ft 7 1/2 in)
- Position: Midfielder

Team information
- Current team: Taraz
- Number: 30

Senior career*
Years	Team	Apps	(Gls)
2001–2005	Esil Bogatyr	48	(4)
2006	Avangard	22	(14)
2007–2009	Esil Bogatyr	51	(10)
2009–2011	Aktobe	63	(8)
2012	Tobol	10	(0)
2012–2013	Zhetysu	24	(2)
2013–2014	Irtysh	41	(3)
2015–	Taraz	20	(0)

International career^{‡}
2009–	Kazakhstan	9	(0)
- * Club domestic league appearances and goals as of 10 November 2015 ‡ National team caps and goals as of 23 January 2015

Evgeniy Nikolayevich Averchenko (Russian: Евгений Николаевич Аверченко; born 6 April 1982) is a Kazakh football midfielder who plays for FC Taraz.

Averchenko began his career playing for FC Esil Bogatyr in 2001. He moved to FC Aktobe in 2009.

Averchenko has made two appearances for the Kazakhstan national football team.
