= Sigourney Bandjar =

Surinamese footballer

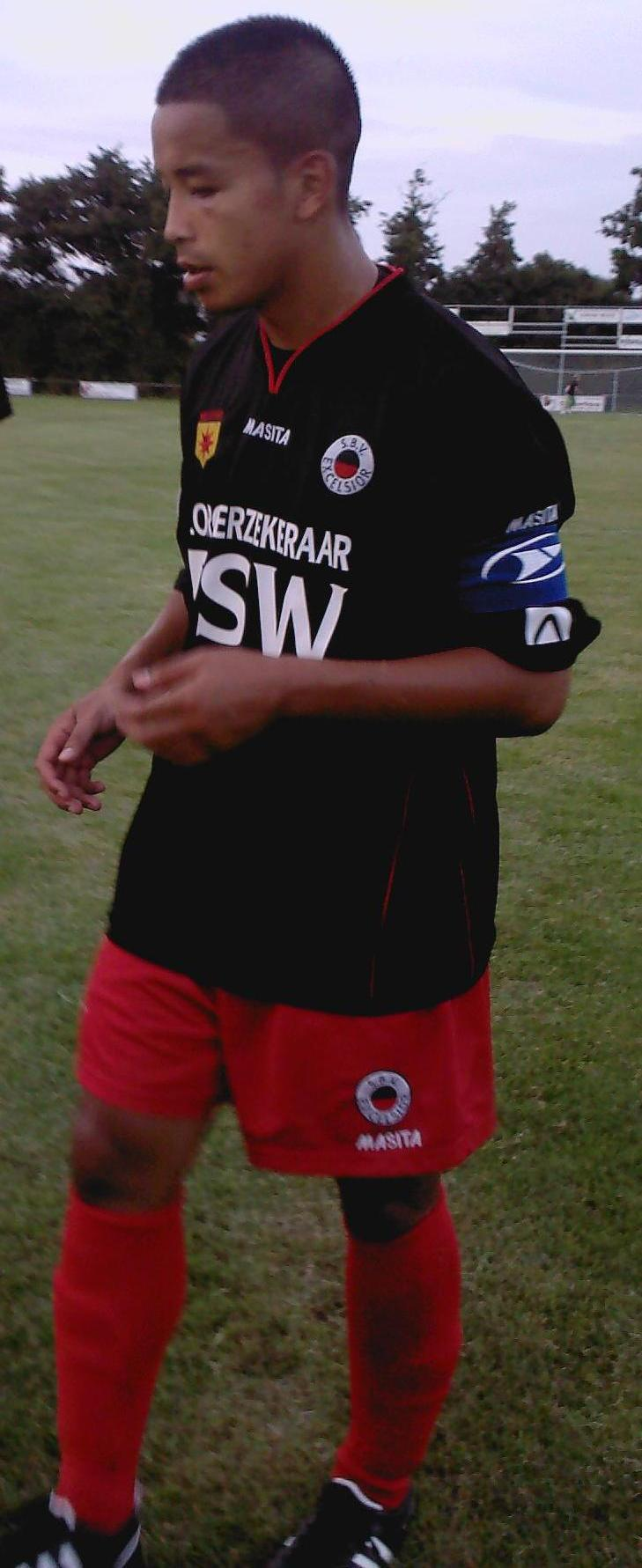

Personal information
- Date of birth: 18 August 1984 (age 42)
- Place of birth: Paramaribo, Suriname
- Height: 1.76 m (5 ft 9 in)
- Position: Right back

Youth career
- Overmaas
- Feyenoord

Senior career*
Years	Team	Apps	(Gls)
2004–2005	Feyenoord	0	(0)
2005	→ Excelsior (loan)	17	(0)
2005–2010	Excelsior	125	(1)
2010–2013	RKC	62	(0)
2014	Taraz	11	(0)
2015–2019	Halsteren		
Total		215	(1)
- * Club domestic league appearances and goals

Sigourney Bandjar (born 18 August 1984) is a Dutch former professional footballer. He previously played five years for Excelsior.

== Career ==
=== Club ===
In August 2010, Bandjar signed a one-year contract with RKC Waalwijk, before renewing it for another year the following summer. After leaving RKC Waalwijk in the summer of 2013, Bandjar spent six-months without a club before signing a one-year contract with Kazakhstan Premier League club FC Taraz in February 2014. Bandjar left Taraz upon the completion of his contract. He returned to the Netherlands the following year, playing for amateur club RKSV Halsteren until his retirement in 2019.

== Career statistics ==
=== Club ===
As of 3 November 2014

Club	Season	Division	League		Cup		Europe		Other (Note: Includes other competitive competitions, including the Eredivisie Relegation Play-off)		Total	
Club	Season	Division	Apps	Goals	Apps	Goals	Apps	Goals	Apps	Goals	Apps	Goals
2004–05	Excelsior (loan)	Eerste Divisie	17	0			–		–		17	0
2005–06	Excelsior	Eerste Divisie	12	0			–		–		28	0
2006–07	Excelsior	Eredivisie	27	0			–		–		30	0
2007–08	Excelsior	Eredivisie	30	0			–		–		30	0
2008–09	Excelsior	Eerste Divisie	28	0	1	0	–		2	0	33	0
2009–10	Excelsior	Eerste Divisie	28	0	1	0	–		–		29	0
2010–11	RKC Waalwijk	Eerste Divisie	26	0	2	0	–		–		28	0
2011–12	RKC Waalwijk	Eredivisie	26	0	4	0	–		–		30	0
2012–13	RKC Waalwijk	Eredivisie	10	0	2	0	–		–		12	0
2014	Taraz	Kazakhstan Premier League	11	0	1	0	–		–		12	0
Total	Netherlands		204	1	10	0	–		2	0	216	1
Total	Kazakhstan		11	0	1	0	–		–		12	0
Career total			215	0	11	0	–		2	0	228	1

== Honours ==
=== Club ===
Excelsior

- Eerste Divisie (1): 2005–06

RKC Waalwijk

- Eerste Divisie (1): 2010–11
