= Rok Roj =

Slovenian footballer (born 1986)

Personal information
- Full name: Rok Roj
- Date of birth: 10 August 1986 (age 40)
- Place of birth: Maribor, SFR Yugoslavia
- Height: 1.76 m (5 ft 9 1/2 in)
- Position: Defender

Youth career
- Maribor

Senior career*
Years	Team	Apps	(Gls)
2005–2007	Maribor	3	(0)
2005	→ Dravograd	12	(1)
2006	→ Malečnik (loan)	7	(0)
2006-2007	→ Dravinja (loan)	23	(3)
2007–2008	Wolfsberger AC	20	(2)
2008	WAC St. Andrä	4	(0)
2008–2009	MU Šentjur	19	(2)
2009–2010	Olimpija	32	(3)
2010–2011	Rudar Velenje	24	(1)
2011–2013	Volendam	36	(0)
2013	Zavrč	12	(0)
2014	Taraz	24	(1)
2015	Nasaf	12	(1)
2016	Drava Ptuj	9	(0)
Total		237	(14)
- * Club domestic league appearances and goals as of 12 January 2024

Rok Roj (born 10 August 1986) is a Slovenian footballer. He started his career in Maribor and later played for Malečnik, WAC St. Andrä, MU Šentjur, Olimpija, Rudar Velenje, Volendam and Zavrč.

== Career ==
In February 2014, Roj signed a one-year contract with FC Taraz of the Kazakhstan Premier League, leaving them in December 2014 following the conclusion of his contract. In February 2015, Roj signed a one-year contract with Uzbek League side FC Nasaf.
