= Aleksandr Kuchma =

Kazakhstani footballer

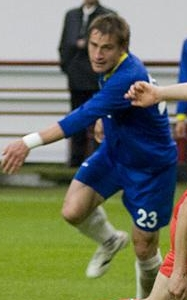
- Kuchma in 2008

Personal information
- Full name: Aleksandr Vasilyevich Kuchma
- Date of birth: 9 December 1980 (age 45)
- Place of birth: Taraz, Kazakh SSR, Soviet Union
- Height: 1.83 m (6 ft 0 in)
- Position: Defender

Team information
- Current team: Ordabasy (fitness coach)

Senior career*
Years	Team	Apps	(Gls)
1997–1998	Taraz	1	(0)
1999	CSKA-Kayrat Almaty	23	(0)
2000–2002	Rastatt 04		(2)
2002–2004	SG Sonnenhof Großaspach	55	(3)
2004	1. FC Pforzheim		
2005	Ruch Chorzów	19	(0)
2006–2008	Astana	77	(5)
2009	Ordabasy	25	(0)
2010	Okzhetpes	10	(1)
2011	Irtysh	11	(0)
2012	Taraz	24	(1)
2013	Tobol	6	(0)
2013–2014	Taraz	25	(0)

International career
2005–2008	Kazakhstan	37	(2)

Managerial career
- 2022: Turan (caretaker)
- 2024: Ordabasy (caretaker)
- * Club domestic league appearances and goals

Alexander Vasilyevich Kuchma (Russian: Александр Васильевич Кучма; born 9 December 1980) is a Kazakh football coach and former professional player who played as a defender. He is currently the fitness coach of Ordabasy.

== Career ==
In December 2014, Kuchma left FC Taraz.

== Career statistics ==
=== International goals ===
#	Date	Venue	Opponent	Score	Result	Competition
1.	12 October 2005	Central Stadium, Almaty, Kazakhstan	Denmark	1–2	Loss	2006 FIFA World Cup qual.
2.	2 July 2006	Central Stadium, Almaty, Kazakhstan	Tajikistan	4–1	Win	Friendly
Correct as of 13 January 2017

== Honours ==
Astana

- Kazakhstan Premier League: 2006
