= Dmytro Bashlay =

Ukrainian football midfielder

Personal information
- Full name: Dmytro Oleksandrovych Bashlay
- Date of birth: 25 April 1990 (age 36)
- Place of birth: Kyiv, Ukrainian SSR
- Height: 1.85 m (6 ft 1 in)
- Positions: Centre-back; defensive midfielder

Team information
- Current team: Broń Radom
- Number: 3

Youth career
- 2003–2005: Lokomotyv Kyiv
- 2005–2006: Obolon-Zmina Kyiv
- 2007: Dynamo Kyiv

Senior career*
Years	Team	Apps	(Gls)
2007–2014	Naftovyk-Ukrnafta Okhtyrka	125	(8)
2014–2015	Taraz	39	(0)
2016	Olimpik Donetsk	0	(0)
2016	Obolon-Brovar Kyiv	10	(1)
2017	Dnepr Mogilev	22	(1)
2018	Poltava	11	(2)
2018	Dnipro-1	8	(1)
2019	Arsenal Kyiv	12	(0)
2019–2021	Podbeskidzie Bielsko-Biała	38	(2)
2021–2024	Radunia Stężyca	73	(3)
2024–	Broń Radom	49	(4)
- * Club domestic league appearances and goals as of 22:20, 3 June 2026 (UTC)

Dmytro Bashlay (Ukrainian: Дмитро Олександрович Башлай; born 25 April 1990) is a Ukrainian professional footballer who plays as a centre-back or defensive midfielder for IV liga Masovia club Broń Radom. His older brother Andrey is also a professional footballer.

== Career ==
Bashlay is a product of different youth sport school systems in Kyiv. After playing 7 years for Naftovyk-Ukrnafta Okhtyrka in the Ukrainian First League, he played in Kazakhstan.

In February 2019, Bashlay moved to Arsenal Kyiv on a free transfer. He made his league debut for the club on 24 February 2019 in a 2–0 home defeat to FC Desna.
