= Vitali Yevstigneyev =

Kazakhstani footballer (born 1985)

Personal information
- Full name: Vitali Yevstigneyev
- Date of birth: 8 August 1985 (age 41)
- Place of birth: Soviet Union
- Height: 1.83 m (6 ft 0 in)
- Position: Midfielder

Team information
- Current team: Taraz
- Number: 8

Senior career*
Years	Team	Apps	(Gls)
2003–2009	Taraz	111	(13)
2010–2011	Ordabasy	26	(1)
2012	Aktobe	7	(0)
2012–	Taraz	25	(1)

International career^{‡}
2011	Kazakhstan	3	(1)
- * Club domestic league appearances and goals as of 1 November 2016 ‡ National team caps and goals as of 24 May 2016

Vitali Yevstigneyev (Kazakh: Виталий Евстигнеев; born 8 August 1985) is a Kazakh football player, who plays for FC Taraz in the Kazakhstan Premier League.

== Career statistics ==
=== International ===
Kazakhstan national team
Year	Apps	Goals
2011	3	1
Total	3	1

Statistics accurate as of match played 11 October 2011

=== International goals ===
As of 6 September 2011

#	Date	Venue	Opponent	Score	Result	Competition	Ref
1.	6 September 2011	Tofiq Bahramov Stadium, Baku, Azerbaijan	Azerbaijan	2–3	2–3	UEFA Euro 2012 Qualifiers	
