= Denys Vasilyev =

Ukrainian footballer

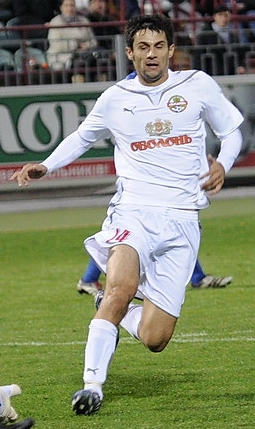

Personal information
- Full name: Denys Oleksandrovych Vasilyev
- Date of birth: 8 May 1987 (age 39)
- Place of birth: Bakhmach, Ukrainian SSR
- Height: 1.87 m (6 ft 1 1/2 in)
- Position: Centre back

Youth career
- 2001–2003: Knyazha Schaslyve
- 2003–2004: RVUFK Kyiv

Senior career*
Years	Team	Apps	(Gls)
2004–2009	CSKA Kyiv	135	(3)
2009–2010	Obolon Kyiv	17	(0)
2010–2013	Kryvbas Kryvyi Rih	24	(0)
2012–2013	→ Naftovyk-Ukrnafta (loan)	23	(0)
2013–2014	Naftovyk-Ukrnafta	23	(0)
2014–2015	Taraz	31	(0)
2016	Helios Kharkiv	4	(0)
2016	Sioni Bolnisi	1	(0)
2018	Naftovyk-Ukrnafta	12	(0)
2018–2019	Vereya	16	(0)
2019	Chornomorets Odesa	6	(0)
2020	Mash'al Mubarek	17	(0)
- * Club domestic league appearances and goals as of 18:44, 16 April 2021 (UTC)

Denys Vasilyev (Ukrainian: Денис Васільєв; born 8 May 1987) is a Ukrainian professional footballer who plays as a centre back.

== Career ==
Vasilyev is a product of FC Knyazhe Schaslyve and RVUFK Kyiv Youth Sportive Schools.

After playing for Ukrainian clubs in the different levels, in June 2014 he signed a contract with Kazakhstani FC Taraz from the Kazakhstan Premier League.

He played for Ukrainian Naftovyk-Ukrnafta Okhtyrka from the Ukrainian First League.
