= Taraz Central Stadium =

Multi-purpose stadium in Taraz, Kazakhstan

Coordinates: 42°54′06″N 71°22′56″E

Central Stadium
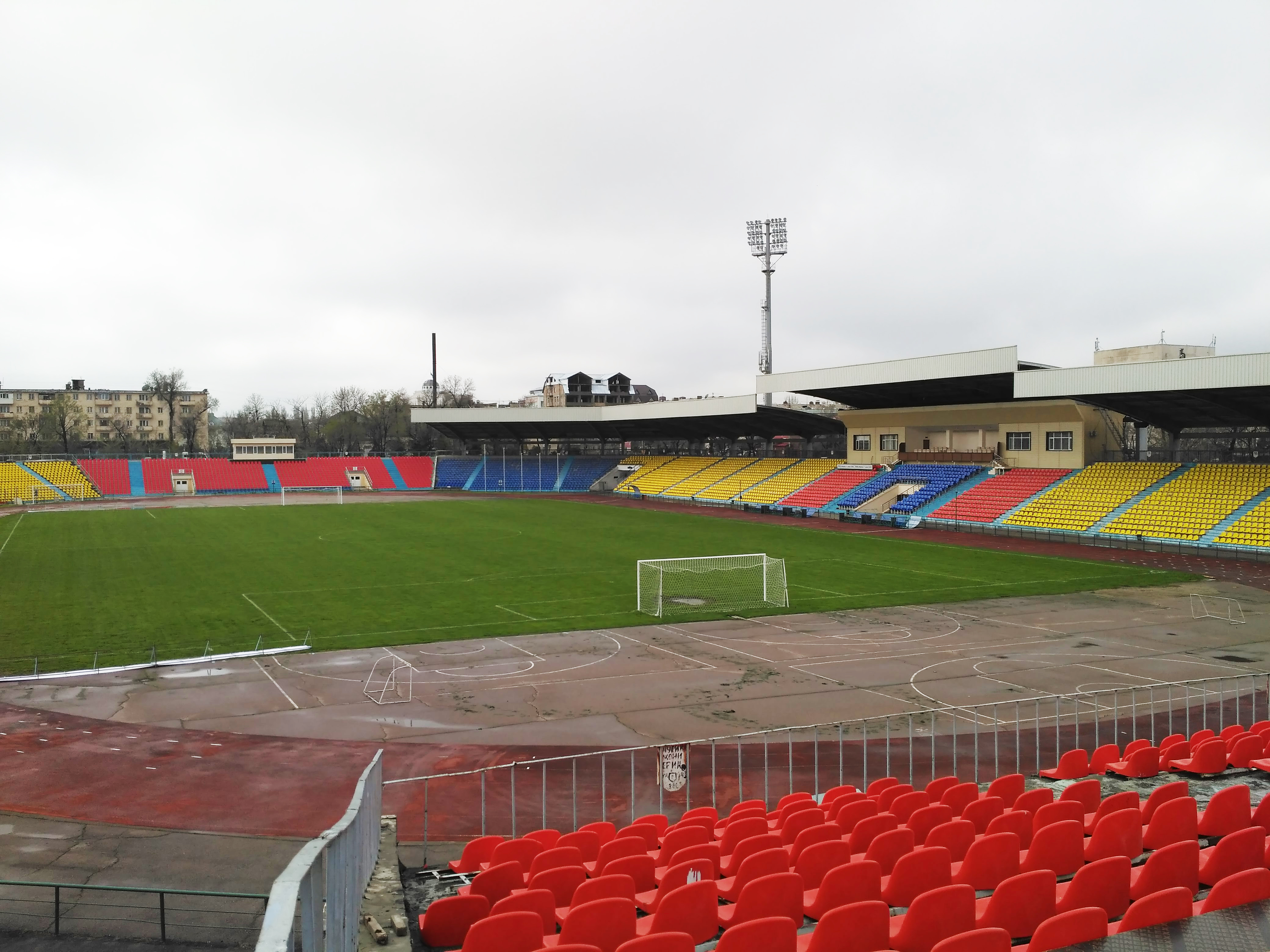
- Interactive map of Central Stadium
- Location: Taraz, Kazakhstan
- Owner: Municipality of Taraz
- Operator: KSU "Central Stadium"
- Capacity: 12,525
- Surface: Grass; 106m x 68m

Construction
- Opened: 1936
- Renovated: 1948, 1975, 2002

Tenant
- FC Taraz

Central Stadium is a multi-purpose stadium in Taraz, Kazakhstan. It is currently used mostly for football matches and is the home stadium of FC Taraz.

== History ==
The stadium was inaugurated in 1936. In 1948 running track and wooden stands were built around the pitch. These were replaced by two reinforced concrete stands during the 1975 reconstruction, which increased the then bench seating made capacity of the stadium to approximately 40,000.

In 2002 individual seats were installed, reducing capacity of the venue to 12,525.
