= Desley Ubbink =

Dutch footballer

Personal information
- Full name: Desley Petrus Cornelis Ubbink
- Date of birth: 15 June 1993 (age 33)
- Place of birth: Roosendaal, Netherlands
- Height: 1.83 m (6 ft 0 in)
- Position: Midfielder

Team information
- Current team: RBC Roosendaal
- Number: 9

Youth career
- RKSV BSC
- –2007: Feyenoord
- 2007–2008: RKSV BSC
- 2008–2009: RBC Roosendaal
- 2009–2011: RKSV BSC
- 2011–2012: RJO Willem II / RKC

Senior career*
| Years | Team | Apps | (Gls) |
| 2012–2014 | Jong RKC Waalwijk | 31 | (1) |
| 2014–2015 | Taraz | 28 | (1) |
| 2015–2016 | Shakhter Karagandy | 40 | (6) |
| 2017–2019 | Trenčín | 63 | (11) |
| 2019–2021 | Podbeskidzie | 22 | (2) |
| 2021–2023 | UTA Arad | 71 | (6) |
| 2023–2024 | Emmen | 31 | (5) |
| 2024 | Corvinul Hunedoara | 0 | (0) |
| 2025 | Bihor Oradea | 10 | (1) |
| 2025 | Metaloglobus București | 19 | (1) |
| 2026– | RBC Roosendaal | 3 | (1) |
- * Club domestic league appearances and goals as of 31 January 2026

Desley Petrus Cornelis Ubbink (born 15 June 1993) is a Dutch professional footballer who played as a midfielder for Derde Divisie club RBC Roosendaal.

== Career ==
=== Club ===
In February 2014, Ubbink signed a three-year contract with Kazakhstan Premier League side FC Taraz. Halfway through his Taraz contract, Ubbink moved to fellow Kazakhstan Premier League side FC Shakhter Karagandy.

On 29 November 2016, Ubbink signed a three-year contract with Fortuna liga club AS Trenčín, to start from the clubs winter break. On 30 July 2019 he was released from his contract.

On 25 November 2019, he joined Polish side Podbeskidzie.

On 7 August 2022, Ubbink joined Emmen on a one-year contract.

On 12 June 2024, Ubbink returned to Romania and joined Corvinul Hunedoara.

== Controversy ==
On 5 October 2015, Ubbink was sentenced to 160 hours of community service, for the sexual abuse of a 14-year-old girl.

In August 2023, after Ubbink's signing with Eerste Divisie club FC Emmen, controversy arose after an FC Emmen communications staff member was caught attempting to erase Ubbink's 2015 conviction from his Wikipedia page.

== Honours ==
Corvinul Hunedoara

- Supercupa României runner-up: 2024
