= 2018 FC Atyrau season =

FC Atyrau
2018 season
- Chairman: Zheksenbai Kusainov
- Manager: Vakhid Masudov (until 9 April); Adrian Sosnovschi (11 April-1 July); Viktor Kumykov (from 4 July)
- Stadium: Munaishy Stadium
- Kazakhstan Premier League: 9th
- Kazakhstan Cup: Runners-Up
- Top goalscorer: League: Tunde Adeniji (8); All: Tunde Adeniji (8)
Home colours	Away colours	Third colours

The 2018 FC Atyrau season is the 18th successive season that the club will play in the Kazakhstan Premier League, the highest tier of association football in Kazakhstan.

== Season events ==
On 8 January 2018, Vakhid Masudov was appointed as FC Atyrau's new manager. On 9 April, Masudov left Atyrau by mutual consent, with Adrian Sosnovschi being appointed as Atyrau's new manager on 11 April. Adrian Sosnovschi and his coaching team resigned on 1 July, with Viktor Kumykov being appointed as Atyrau's third manager of the season on 4 July.

== Squad ==
As of 30 July 2018

Note: Flags indicate national team as defined under FIFA eligibility rules; some limited exceptions apply. Players may hold more than one non-FIFA nationality.

No.	Pos.	Nation	Player
1	GK	KAZ	Vladimir Loginovsky
2	DF	KAZ	Dauren Mazhitov
3	MF	CMR	Joseph Nane
4	DF	CRO	Tomislav Barbarić
5	DF	UKR	Rizvan Ablitarov
6	MF	KAZ	Altynbek Saparov
8	MF	KAZ	Dauren Kayralliyev
7	MF	SVK	František Kubík
9	FW	KAZ	Alexey Rodionov
10	MF	KAZ	Marat Khairullin
11	DF	KAZ	Ruslan Zhanysbaev
13	MF	KAZ	Aibar Nurybekov

No.	Pos.	Nation	Player
17	FW	NGA	Tunde Adeniji
18	DF	KAZ	Kuanish Kalmuratov
20	GK	KAZ	Andrey Pasechenko
22	MF	SRB	Novica Maksimović
23	MF	KAZ	Didar Zhalmukan (loan from Astana)
24	MF	KAZ	Yuriy Pertsukh (loan from Astana)
35	GK	KAZ	Azamat Zhomartov
44	MF	CRO	Jure Obšivač
75	DF	KAZ	Kuanysh Eltzerov
77	DF	KAZ	Eldar Abdrakhmanov
81	FW	SRB	Predrag Sikimić
83	MF	KAZ	Eduard Sergienko

== Transfers ==
=== Winter ===
In: Note: Flags indicate national team as defined under FIFA eligibility rules; some limited exceptions apply. Players may hold more than one non-FIFA nationality.

No.	Pos.	Nation	Player
1	GK	KAZ	Vladimir Loginovsky (from (Kazakhstan) Taraz)
3	MF	CMR	Joseph Nane (from (Kazakhstan) Aktobe)
4	DF	CRO	Tomislav Barbarić (from (Croatia) Rudeš)
7	MF	KGZ	Anton Zemlianukhin
9	FW	KAZ	Alexey Rodionov
11	DF	KAZ	Ruslan Zhanysbayev (from (Kazakhstan) Caspiy)
17	FW	NGA	Tunde Adeniji (from (Bulgaria) Levski Sofia)
23	MF	KAZ	Piraliy Aliev (from (Kazakhstan) Irtysh Pavlodar)
30	DF	SRB	Stefan Živković (from (Kazakhstan) Irtysh Pavlodar)
32	DF	KAZ	Rafkat Aslan (from (Kazakhstan) Aktobe)
75	DF	KAZ	Kuanysh Eltzerov
78	FW	BLR	Ihar Zyankovich (from (Kazakhstan) Aktobe)

Out: Note: Flags indicate national team as defined under FIFA eligibility rules; some limited exceptions apply. Players may hold more than one non-FIFA nationality.

No.	Pos.	Nation	Player
3	DF	GEO	Ucha Lobjanidze (to (Georgia (country)) Samtredia)
4	MF	CRO	Jure Obšivač (to (Romania) Sepsi Sfântu Gheorghe)
7	MF	KAZ	Alisher Suley (to (Kazakhstan) Ordabasy)
8	MF	UZB	Shavkat Salomov (to (Uzbekistan) Buxoro)
9	FW	GEO	Vladimir Dvalishvili (to (Israel) Hapoel Ashkelon)
11	MF	KAZ	Aleksei Marov
17	MF	KAZ	Almas Armenov
19	MF	SRB	Jovan Đokić (to (Uzbekistan) AGMK)
21	MF	KAZ	Nauryzbek Zhagorov
26	GK	KAZ	Nurbolat Kalmenov
27	FW	KAZ	Bekzhan Abdrakhman (to (Kazakhstan) Ordabasy)
28	DF	KAZ	Zakhar Korobov
32	FW	KAZ	Daurenbek Tazhimbetov (to (Kazakhstan) Kaisar)
34	GK	KAZ	Zhasur Narzikulov (to (Kazakhstan) Ordabasy)
95	DF	KAZ	Zhaksylyk Halelov

=== Summer ===
In: Note: Flags indicate national team as defined under FIFA eligibility rules; some limited exceptions apply. Players may hold more than one non-FIFA nationality.

No.	Pos.	Nation	Player
7	MF	SVK	František Kubík (from (Slovakia) MŠK Žilina)
23	DF	CRO	Ivica Žunić (from (Ukraine) Chornomorets Odesa)
23	MF	KAZ	Didar Zhalmukan (loan from (Kazakhstan) Astana)
24	MF	KAZ	Yuriy Pertsukh (loan from (Kazakhstan) Astana)
44	MF	CRO	Jure Obšivač (from (Romania) Sepsi Sfântu Gheorghe)

Out: Note: Flags indicate national team as defined under FIFA eligibility rules; some limited exceptions apply. Players may hold more than one non-FIFA nationality.

No.	Pos.	Nation	Player
7	MF	KGZ	Anton Zemlianukhin
12	DF	KAZ	Ruslan Esatov (to (Kazakhstan) Makhtaaral)
23	MF	KAZ	Piraliy Aliev (to (Kazakhstan) Irtysh Pavlodar)
23	DF	CRO	Ivica Žunić
30	DF	SRB	Stefan Živković (to (Serbia) Zemun)
32	DF	KAZ	Rafkat Aslan (to (Kazakhstan) Irtysh Pavlodar)
66	MF	KAZ	Anton Chichulin (to (Kazakhstan) Shakhter Karagandy)
78	FW	BLR	Ihar Zyankovich (to (Kazakhstan) Kaisar)
—	DF	KAZ	Yerasen Amanzhol (loan to (Kazakhstan) Caspiy)

== Competitions ==
=== Premier League ===
==== Results summary ====
Overall								Home						Away					
Pld	W	D	L	GF	GA	GD	Pts	W	D	L	GF	GA	GD	W	D	L	GF	GA	GD
33	9	9	15	34	47	−13	36	8	3	5	19	16	+3	1	6	10	15	31	−16

Last updated: 11 November 2018.
Source: See Results

==== Results by round ====
Round	1	2	3	4	5	6	7	8	9	10	11	12	13	14	15	16	17	18	19	20	21	22	23	24	25	26	27	28	29	30	31	32	33
Ground	A	A	A	A	H	A	H	H	A	H	A	H	H	H	A	H	A	A	H	A	H	H	H	A	A	H	H	A	A	H	A	H	A
Result	L	L	L	L	D	D	W	D	D	L	D	L	W	L	L	D	D	L	W	L	W	W	W	L	L	W	L	L	D	W	D	W	L
Position	7	11	12	12	12	11	9	10	10	12	10	11	11	12	12	12	12	12	12	12	12	9	9	9	9	9	9	10	11	8	9	8	9

Source: See Results
A = Away; H = Home; W = Win; D = Draw; L = Loss

==== Results ====
11 March 2018 1	Irtysh Pavlodar	2 – 1	Atyrau	Pavlodar
15:00 (UTC+6)	Shabalin 5'; Popadiuc 21'; R.Rozybakiev (yellow card) 57'; Salami (yellow card) 83'; Fonseca (yellow card) 90+2'; Kislyak (yellow card) 90+3'	Report	Nane (yellow card) 28'; E.Abdrakhmanov (yellow card) 50'; Khairullin (yellow card) 75'; Kislitsyn 88' (o.g.)	Stadium: Central Stadium; Attendance: 4,500; Referee: Aydin Rakhimbayev

17 March 2018 2	Kairat	2 – 0	Atyrau	Almaty
15:00 (UTC+6)	Akhmetov (yellow card) 2'; Silveira 56'; Vorogovskiy 86'	Report	Adeniji (yellow card) 4' (yellow-red card) 34'	Stadium: Central Stadium; Attendance: 7,900; Referee: Denis Izmailov

31 March 2018 3	Atyrau	0 – 1	Ordabasy	Atyrau
16:00 (UTC+6)	Ablitarov (yellow card) 70'	Report	Nagaev (yellow card) 15'; M.Tolebek (yellow card) 40'; Diakate 71' (pen.) (yellow card) 78'	Stadium: Tomarly Stadium; Attendance: 2,000; Referee: Sergey Gorokhovodatskiy

7 April 2018 4	Tobol	3 – 2	Atyrau	Kostanay
15:00 (UTC+6)	Shynder 22', 64'; Kankava 68'; Fedin (yellow card) 71'	Report	Barbarić (yellow card) 11'; Khairullin (yellow card) 13' (goal) 27'; Nane 40'; Loginovsky (yellow card) 69'	Stadium: Stadion Zatobolets; Attendance: 3,000; Referee: Furkhat Atazhanov

14 April 2018 5	Atyrau	0 – 0	Shakhter Karagandy	Atyrau
17:00 (UTC+6)		Report	Y.Tarasov (yellow card) 22'; I.Pikalkin (yellow card) 35'	Stadium: Tomarly Stadion; Attendance: 1,200; Referee: Aleksandr Gauzer

22 April 2018 6	Kyzylzhar	1 – 1	Atyrau	Petropavl
15:00 (UTC+6)	Grigalashvili 24' (pen.); I.Aitov (yellow card) 55'; Muldarov (yellow card) 83'	Report	Khairullin (yellow card) 41'; Nane (yellow card) 44'; A.Nurybekov (yellow card) 73'; E.Abdrakhmanov 77'	Stadium: Karasay Stadium; Attendance: 4,000; Referee: Daniyar Sakhi

28 April 2018 7	Atyrau	1 – 0	Zhetysu	Atyrau
17:30 (UTC+6)	Khairullin 68'; Adeniji (yellow card) 90'	Report	L.Kasradze (yellow card) 40'	Stadium: Tomarly Stadion; Attendance: 1,000; Referee: Igor Chesnokov

5 May 2018 8	Atyrau	1 – 1	Aktobe	Atyrau
17:30 (UTC+6)	Sergienko (yellow card) 14'; R.Aslan (yellow card) 29'; K.Kalmuratov (yellow card) 63'; Sikimić 84'	Report	Fabrício (yellow card) 31'; Marjanović 37'	Stadium: Tomarly Stadion; Attendance: 1,000; Referee: Aleksei Bobrov

9 May 2018 9	Akzhayik	1 – 1	Atyrau	Oral
15:00 (UTC+6)	Eseola 64'; M.Sapanov (yellow card) 78'; Khudobyak (yellow card) 80'	Report	E.Abdrakhmanov 10'; Živković (yellow card) 28'; R.Dzumatov (yellow card) 77'; R.Esatov (red card) 78'	Stadium: Petr Atoyan Stadium; Attendance: 3,000; Referee: Aydin Rakhimbayev

13 May 2018 10	Atyrau	0 – 2	Astana	Atyrau
18:30 (UTC+6)	Khairullin (yellow card) 32'; A.Saparov (yellow card) 32'	Report	Kleinheisler (yellow card) 32'; Malyi (yellow card) 36'; Twumasi 61' (pen.); Tomasov 64'; Despotović (yellow card) 70'	Stadium: Tomarly Stadion; Attendance: 2,000; Referee: Bolat Karlibayev

19 May 2018 11	Kaisar	0 – 0	Atyrau	Kyzylorda
17:00 (UTC+6)	Narzildaev (yellow card) 67'; Tagybergen (yellow card) 90+1'; Arzhanov (yellow card) 90+2'	Report	A.Nurybekov (yellow card) 52'; R.Dzumatov (yellow card) 59' (yellow-red card) 86'; A.Saparov (yellow card) 67'; A.Pasechenko (yellow card) 90+7'	Stadium: Gani Muratbayev Stadium; Attendance: 2,500; Referee: Saken Bayimbet

26 May 2018 12	Atyrau	1 – 3	Kairat	Atyrau
19:00 (UTC+6)	Živković (yellow card) 15'; R.Aslan (yellow card) 79'; Adeniji 69'	Report	Arshavin 28'; Isael 33'; Anene 68' (yellow card) 81'	Stadium: Tomarly Stadion; Attendance: 1,000; Referee: Artyom Kuchin

31 May 2018 13	Ordabasy	0 – 2	Atyrau	Shymkent
19:00 (UTC+6)	Dosmagambetov (yellow card) 15'; Nagaev (yellow card) 59'; Spahija (yellow card) 74'	Report	Khairullin (yellow card) 17'; Zyankovich 25'; Chichulin (yellow card) 54'; A.Nurybekov (yellow card) 79'; Adeniji 89'; A.Saparov (yellow card) 90+1'	Stadium: Kazhymukan Munaitpasov Stadium; Attendance: 2,500; Referee: Igor Aleshin

17 June 2018 14	Atyrau	0 – 2	Tobol	Atyrau
19:00 (UTC+6)	A.Saparov (yellow card) 5' (yellow-red card) 87'; R.Esatov (yellow card) 90'	Report	Nurgaliev 64', 85'; Šikov (yellow card) 90+1'	Stadium: Tomarly Stadion; Attendance: 1,000; Referee: Bakhyt Kyzylbaev

23 June 2018 15	Shakhter Karagandy	3 – 0	Atyrau	Karaganda
18:00 (UTC+6)	Kojašević 35'; Shakhmetov 74'; Y.Tarasov 87'	Report	R.Aslan (yellow card) 45'	Stadium: Shakhter Stadium; Attendance: 1,000; Referee: Denis Izmailov

1 July 2018 16	Atyrau	0 – 0	Kyzylzhar	Atyrau
19:30 (UTC+6)	Ablitarov (yellow card) 20'; K.Kalmuratov (yellow card) 90'	Report	Coronel (yellow card) 90+5'	Stadium: Munaishy Stadium; Attendance: 1,000; Referee: Timur Kumashev

7 July 2018 17	Zhetysu	2 – 2	Atyrau	Taldıqorğan
18:00 (UTC+6)	Malakyan (yellow card) 27'; Mawutor 74'; Hromțov 87'	Report	Khairullin 5' (pen.); Barbarić 47'	Stadium: Zhetysu Stadium; Attendance: 1,000; Referee: Ruslan Omarov

14 July 2018 18	Aktobe	5 – 1	Atyrau	Aktobe
21:00 (UTC+6)	Z.Kukeyev 27'; A.Shurigin (yellow card) 30'; Radin 60', 82'; Pizzelli 65', 79'	Report	A.Saparov (yellow card) 17'; A.Nurybekov (yellow card) 26'; Maksimović (yellow card) 69'; Barbarić (yellow card) 75'; Sikimić 83'; Khairullin (yellow card) 90+3'	Stadium: Central Stadium; Attendance: 7,500; Referee: Aleksandr Aliyev

21 July 2018 19	Atyrau	2 – 0	Akzhayik	Atyrau
20:30 (UTC+6)	Zyankovich 24'; Sergienko (yellow card) 43'; Barbarić (yellow card) 49'; Sikimić 55'; Adeniji (yellow card) 62'; D.Kayralliyev (yellow card) 82'	Report	Mané (yellow card) 43'; B.Shaikhov (yellow card) 64'; Khudobyak (yellow card) 67'	Stadium: Munaishy Stadium; Attendance: 2,500; Referee: Denis Izmailov

28 July 2018 20	Astana	2 – 0	Atyrau	Astana
19:00 (UTC+6)	Logvinenko 2'; Malyi 62'	Report	Ablitarov (yellow card) 49'	Stadium: Astana Arena; Attendance: 2,500; Referee: Bolat Saryev

4 August 2018 21	Atyrau	2 – 1	Kaisar	Atyrau
20:00 (UTC+6)	Adeniji 22' (yellow card) 70'; Khairullin (yellow card) 64' (goal) 90+5'; Barbarić (yellow card) 66'	Report	Narzildaev (yellow card) 68'; Graf (yellow card) 86'; Punoševac 88'	Stadium: Munaishy Stadium; Attendance: 3,000; Referee: Zhandos Abzhan

12 August 2018 22	Atyrau	2 – 0	Irtysh Pavlodar	Atyrau
20:00 (UTC+6)	Khairullin 38' (pen.); Adeniji 46'; Kubík (yellow card) 90+3'	Report	Shestakov (yellow card) 32'; Seco (yellow card) 90+2'	Stadium: Munaishy Stadium; Attendance: 2,500; Referee: Daniyar Sakhi

18 August 2018 23	Atyrau	2 – 1	Tobol	Atyrau
20:00 (UTC+6)	Khairullin (yellow card) 45+2' (goal) 51'; Sikimić (yellow card) 48'; K.Kalmuratov (yellow card) 55'; Obšivač (yellow card) 66' (goal) 85'; Sergienko (yellow card) 90+2'	Report	S.Zharynbetov (yellow card) 28'; Miroshnichenko (yellow card) 38'; Nusserbayev (yellow card) 39' (yellow-red card) 90+2'; Bystrov 75'; Dmitrenko (yellow card) 90+2'	Stadium: Munaishy Stadium; Attendance: 3,500; Referee: Sergey Gorokhovodatskiy

26 August 2018 24	Kairat	4 – 2	Atyrau	Almaty
19:00 (UTC+6)	A.Sokolenko 16'; Isael (yellow card) 59'; Eseola 73', 90+2'; Arshavin 71'	Report	Adeniji 46', 55'; A.Saparov (yellow card) 72'; Sikimić (yellow card) 80'	Stadium: Central Stadium; Attendance: 2,000; Referee: Bagdat Abdullaev

16 September 2018 25	Shakhter Karagandy	2 – 1	Atyrau	Karaganda
18:00 (UTC+6)	S.Shaff 39'; Tkachuk (yellow card) 41'; Kojašević 85'	Report	Obšivač 9'; Ablitarov (yellow card) 85'	Stadium: Shakhter Stadium; Attendance: 3,000; Referee: Saken Bayimbet

22 September 2018 27	Atyrau	3 – 2	Kyzylzhar	Atyrau
18:30 (UTC+6)	Pertsukh 11'; Khairullin 55' (pen.); A.Rodionov 88'	Report	Lečić 27'; K.Sultanov (yellow card) 54'; O.Altayev (yellow card) 58' (yellow-red card) 58'; Grigalashvili 70'	Stadium: Munaishy Stadium; Attendance: 2,500; Referee: Bakhyt Kyzylbaev

26 September 2018 25	Atyrau	0 – 1	Astana	Atyrau
18:30 (UTC+6)	E.Abdrakhmanov (yellow card) 50'; Kubík (yellow card) 54'; A.Nurybekov (yellow card) 84'; Obšivač (yellow card) 85'	Report	Henrique (yellow card) 48'; Shchotkin 87' (pen.)	Stadium: Munaishy Stadium; Attendance: 4,000; Referee: Bagdat Abdullaev

30 September 2018 28	Irtysh Pavlodar	1 – 0	Atyrau	Pavlodar
15:00 (UTC+6)	Obšivač 50' (o.g.); Seco (yellow card) 58'	Report	A.Nurybekov (yellow card) 33'; Ablitarov (yellow card) 83'	Stadium: Central Stadium; Attendance: 1,500; Referee: Aydin Rakhimbayev

6 October 2018 29	Kaisar	2 – 2	Atyrau	Kyzylorda
16:00 (UTC+6)	Graf (yellow card) 16'; Narzildaev (yellow card) 21'; Punoševac (yellow card) 52'; Djédjé (yellow card) 55'; I.Amirseitov (yellow card) 73'; Tagybergen 78' (pen.); Lamanje 85'	Report	K.Kalmuratov (yellow card) 17'; Zhangylyshbay 67'; Barbarić (yellow card) 73'; A.Rodionov 87' (yellow card) 90+2'	Stadium: Gani Muratbayev Stadium; Attendance: 3,000; Referee: Georgiy Chekhovskiy

21 October 2018 30	Atyrau	2 – 1	Akzhayik	Atyrau
16:00 (UTC+6)	Kubík (yellow card) 38'; Adeniji 40', 58'; D.Zhalmukan (yellow card) 54'; A.Rodionov (yellow card) 87'	Report	Mané 30'; E.Tapalov (yellow card) 45'; M.Sapanov (yellow card) 50'; Chachua (yellow card) 67'; Basov (yellow card) 84'	Stadium: Munaishy Stadium; Attendance: 3,000; Referee: Daniyar Sakhi

27 October 2018 31	Zhetysu	0 – 0	Atyrau	Taldıqorğan
15:00 (UTC+6)		Report	Sikimić (yellow card) 42'; K.Kalmuratov (yellow card) 71'; Sergienko (yellow card) 73'; Loginovsky (yellow card) 90+2'; Ablitarov (yellow card) 90+4'	Stadium: Zhetysu Stadium; Attendance: 1,500; Referee: Arman Ismuratov

3 November 2018 32	Atyrau	3 – 1	Aktobe	Atyrau
15:00 (UTC+6)	Sikimić 16', 58'; Ablitarov (yellow card) 53'; K.Kalmuratov 65'	Report	Pertsukh 21' (o.g.); B.Kairov (yellow card) 47'; A.Shurigin (yellow card) 57'; S.Zhumagali (yellow card) 79'	Stadium: Munaishy Stadium; Attendance: 3,000; Referee: Georgiy Chekhovskiy

11 November 2018 33	Ordabasy	1 – 0	Atyrau	Shymkent
15:00 (UTC+6)	Mehanović 15'	Report	A.Rodionov (yellow card) 86'; Adeniji (yellow card) 87'	Stadium: Kazhymukan Munaitpasov Stadium; Attendance: 2,700; Referee: Grigory Moskovchenko

==== League table ====
Pos	Team	Pld	W	D	L	GF	GA	GD	Pts	Qualification or relegation
7	Aktobe (Note: Aktobe had six points deducted on 27 April 2018 as a punishment for unpaid debts to former player Danilo Neco.)	33	13	9	11	51	47	+4	42	
8	Shakhter Karagandy	33	8	12	13	29	36	−7	36	
9	Atyrau	33	9	9	15	34	47	−13	36	
10	Irtysh Pavlodar (O)	33	10	5	18	28	45	−17	35	Qualification for the relegation play-offs
11	Kyzylzhar (R)	33	10	5	18	27	48	−21	35	Relegation to the Kazakhstan First Division

Source: UEFA, Soccerway
Rules for classification: 1) Points; 2) Goal difference; 3) Matches won; 4) Goals scored; 5) Away goals scored; 6) Head-to-head points; 7) Head-to-head matches won; 8) Head-to-head goal difference; 9) Head-to-head goals scored; 10) Head-to-head away goals scored; 11) Draw.
(O) Play-off winners; (R) Relegated

=== Kazakhstan Cup ===
18 April 2018 Last 16	Akzhayik	0 – 1	Atyrau	Aksay
17:00 (UTC+6)	E.Tapalov (yellow card) 65'; M.Sapanov (yellow card) 71'	Report	Ablitarov (yellow card) 27'; Maksimović 66' (pen.); Chichulin (yellow card) 74'	Stadium: Karaşıganak Stadium; Attendance: 1,000; Referee: Askhat Abdanbayev

23 May 2018 Quarterfinal	Atyrau	2 – 1	Tobol	Atyrau
19:00 (UTC+6)	Zyankovich 7', 66'; R.Aslan (yellow card) 81'; D.Kayralliyev (yellow card) 88'	Report	Nusserbayev 56' Dmitrenko (yellow card) 90'	Stadium: Munaishy Stadium; Attendance: 800; Referee: Bagdat Abdullaev

14 June 2018 Semifinal 1st leg	Shakhter Karagandy	0 – 0	Atyrau	Karaganda
18:30 (UTC+6)	Mihunov (yellow card) 38'; Najaryan (yellow card) 72'; Y.Tarasov (yellow card) 77'	Report	Ablitarov (yellow card) 77'	Stadium: Shakhter Stadium; Attendance: 2,500; Referee: Daniyar Sakhi

27 June 2018 Semifinal 2nd leg	Atyrau	3 – 1 (3 – 1 agg.)	Shakhter Karagandy	Atyrau
20:00 (UTC+6)	Sikimić 3'; Zyankovich 36'; Ruslan Esatov (yellow card) 53'; Rafkat Aslan (yellow card) 58'; Khairullin 62' (pen.); Dauren Kayralliyev (yellow card) 81'; Kuanish Kalmuratov (yellow card) 83'	Report	Vůch 16'; Shakhmetov (yellow card) 77'	Stadium: Munaishy Stadium; Attendance: 2,000; Referee: Saken Bayimbet

==== Final ====
24 November 2018	Atyrau	0 – 1	Kairat	Astana
15:00 (UTC+6)	Obšivač (yellow card) 53'; A.Saparov (yellow card) 83'; Khairullin (red card) 90+5'	Report	A.Sokolenko 16'; S.Keyler (yellow card) 41'; Shvyrev (yellow card) 90+3'	Stadium: Astana Arena; Attendance: 4,500; Referee: Bakhyt Kyzylbaev

== Squad statistics ==
As of Match played 24 November 2018

=== Appearances and goals ===
No.	Pos	Nat	Player	Total		Premier League		Kazakhstan Cup	
No.	Pos	Nat	Player	Apps	Goals	Apps	Goals	Apps	Goals
1	GK	(Kazakhstan) KAZ	Vladimir Loginovsky	20	0	17	0	3	0
2	DF	(Kazakhstan) KAZ	Dauren Mazhitov	2	0	2	0	0	0
3	MF	(Cameroon) CMR	Joseph Nane	27	1	23+1	1	3	0
4	DF	(Croatia) CRO	Tomislav Barbarić	23	1	21	1	1+1	0
5	DF	(Ukraine) UKR	Rizvan Ablitarov	32	0	27+1	0	4	0
6	MF	(Kazakhstan) KAZ	Altynbek Saparov	18	0	9+5	0	1+3	0
7	MF	(Slovakia) SVK	František Kubík	9	0	5+3	0	1	0
8	MF	(Kazakhstan) KAZ	Dauren Kayralliyev	15	0	3+9	0	2+1	0
9	FW	(Kazakhstan) KAZ	Alexey Rodionov	14	2	1+12	2	0+1	0
10	MF	(Kazakhstan) KAZ	Marat Khairullin	29	8	24	7	5	1
11	DF	(Kazakhstan) KAZ	Ruslan Zhanysbaev	1	0	0+1	0	0	0
13	MF	(Kazakhstan) KAZ	Aibar Nurybekov	20	0	11+6	0	3	0
17	FW	(Nigeria) NGA	Tunde Adeniji	34	8	25+5	8	1+3	0
18	DF	(Kazakhstan) KAZ	Kuanish Kalmuratov	29	1	24+1	1	2+2	0
20	GK	(Kazakhstan) KAZ	Andrey Pasechenko	18	0	16	0	2	0
22	MF	(Serbia) SRB	Novica Maksimović	25	1	20+3	0	2	1
23	MF	(Kazakhstan) KAZ	Didar Zhalmukan	11	0	2+8	0	0+1	0
24	MF	(Kazakhstan) KAZ	Yuriy Pertsukh	10	1	9+1	1	0	0
44	MF	(Croatia) CRO	Jure Obšivač	13	2	9+3	2	1	0
74	MF	(Kazakhstan) KAZ	Rinat Dzumatov	19	0	12+4	0	1+2	0
77	DF	(Kazakhstan) KAZ	Eldar Abdrakhmanov	19	2	16+2	2	1	0
81	FW	(Serbia) SRB	Predrag Sikimić	33	6	23+6	5	4	1
83	MF	(Kazakhstan) KAZ	Eduard Sergienko	30	0	21+4	0	5	0
Players away from Atyrau on loan:
Players who left Atyrau during the season:
7	MF	(Kyrgyzstan) KGZ	Anton Zemlianukhin	4	0	0+4	0	0	0
12	DF	(Kazakhstan) KAZ	Ruslan Esatov	6	0	3+2	0	1	0
23	MF	(Kazakhstan) KAZ	Piraliy Aliev	2	0	2	0	0	0
24	DF	(Kazakhstan) KAZ	Yersayl Amanzholov	1	0	0+1	0	0	0
30	DF	(Serbia) SRB	Stefan Živković	16	0	8+5	0	3	0
32	DF	(Kazakhstan) KAZ	Rafkat Aslan	16	0	9+3	0	4	0
66	DF	(Kazakhstan) KAZ	Anton Chichulin	12	0	10	0	2	0
78	FW	(Belarus) BLR	Ihar Zyankovich	19	5	10+5	2	3+1	3

=== Goal scorers ===
Place	Position	Nation	Number	Name	Premier League	Kazakhstan Cup	Total
1	FW	(Nigeria)	17	Tunde Adeniji	8	0	8
1	MF	(Kazakhstan)	10	Marat Khairullin	7	1	8
3	FW	(Serbia)	81	Predrag Sikimić	5	1	6
4	FW	(Belarus)	78	Ihar Zyankovich	2	3	5
5	DF	(Kazakhstan)	77	Eldar Abdrakhmanov	2	0	2
5	MF	(Croatia)	44	Jure Obšivač	2	0	2
5	FW	(Kazakhstan)	9	Alexey Rodionov	2	0	2
5				Own goal	2	0	2
9	MF	(Cameroon)	3	Joseph Nane	1	0	1
9	DF	(Croatia)	4	Tomislav Barbarić	1	0	1
9	MF	(Kazakhstan)	24	Yuriy Pertsukh	1	0	1
9	DF	(Kazakhstan)	18	Kuanish Kalmuratov	1	0	1
9	MF	(Serbia)	22	Novica Maksimović	0	1	1
				TOTALS	34	6	40

=== Disciplinary record ===
Number	Nation	Position	Name	Premier League		Kazakhstan Cup		Total	
Number	Nation	Position	Name	Booked	Sent off (straight red)	Booked	Sent off (straight red)	Booked	Sent off (straight red)
1	(Kazakhstan)	GK	Vladimir Loginovsky	2	0	0	0	2	0
3	(Cameroon)	MF	Joseph Nane	2	0	0	0	2	0
4	(Croatia)	DF	Tomislav Barbarić	5	0	0	0	5	0
5	(Ukraine)	DF	Rizvan Ablitarov	7	0	2	0	9	0
6	(Kazakhstan)	MF	Altynbek Saparov	7	1	1	0	8	1
7	(Slovakia)	MF	František Kubík	3	0	0	0	3	0
8	(Kazakhstan)	MF	Dauren Kayralliyev	1	0	2	0	3	0
9	(Kazakhstan)	FW	Alexey Rodionov	3	0	0	0	3	0
10	(Kazakhstan)	MF	Marat Khairullin	8	0	0	1	8	1
12	(Kazakhstan)	DF	Ruslan Esatov	1	1	1	0	2	1
13	(Kazakhstan)	MF	Aibar Nurybekov	6	0	0	0	6	0
17	(Nigeria)	FW	Tunde Adeniji	6	1	0	0	6	1
18	(Kazakhstan)	DF	Kuanish Kalmuratov	5	0	1	0	6	0
20	(Kazakhstan)	GK	Andrey Pasechenko	1	0	0	0	1	0
22	(Serbia)	MF	Novica Maksimović	1	0	0	0	1	0
23	(Kazakhstan)	MF	Didar Zhalmukan	1	0	0	0	1	0
44	(Croatia)	MF	Jure Obšivač	2	0	1	0	3	0
74	(Kazakhstan)	MF	Rinat Dzumatov	3	1	0	0	3	1
77	(Kazakhstan)	DF	Eldar Abdrakhmanov	2	0	0	0	2	0
81	(Serbia)	FW	Predrag Sikimić	3	0	0	0	3	0
83	(Kazakhstan)	MF	Eduard Sergienko	4	0	0	0	4	0
Players who left Atyrau during the season:
30	(Serbia)	DF	Stefan Živković	2	0	0	0	2	0
32	(Kazakhstan)	DF	Rafkat Aslan	3	0	2	0	5	0
66	(Kazakhstan)	DF	Anton Chichulin	1	0	1	0	2	0
			TOTALS	74	4	11	1	85	5
