= 2017 Kazakhstan Cup final =

- Event: 2017 Kazakhstan Cup
Kairat	Atyrau
1	0
- Date: 14 October 2017
- Venue: Central Stadium, Aktobe
- Referee: Artyom Kuchin
- Attendance: 10,400

The 2017 Kazakhstan Cup final was the 26th final of the Kazakhstan Cup since the countries independence. The match was contested between FC Kairat and FC Atyrau.

== Match ==
=== Details ===
14 October 2017
19:00 (UTC+6)

Kairat	1–0	Atyrau
Gohou 70'	Report

Central Stadium, Aktobe
Attendance: 10,400
Referee: Artyom Kuchin

Kairat	Atyrau

GK	1	(Kazakhstan) Vladimir Plotnikov
DF	4	(Kazakhstan) Yeldos Akhmetov		(substituted off) 65'
DF	5	(Kazakhstan) Gafurzhan Suyumbayev
DF	14	(Spain) César Arzo
DF	29	(Trinidad and Tobago) Sheldon Bateau
MF	25	(Hungary) Ákos Elek
MF	10	(Brazil) Isael
MF	63	(Kazakhstan) Magomed Paragulgov		(substituted off) 90+2'
MF	9	(Kazakhstan) Bauyrzhan Islamkhan (c)
MF	28	(Russia) Andrey Arshavin
FW	11	(Ivory Coast) Gerard Gohou	(red card) 87'	(substituted off) 86'
Substitutes:
GK	27	(Kazakhstan) Stas Pokatilov
DF	2	(Kazakhstan) Timur Rudoselskiy
MF	3	(Kazakhstan) Jan Vorogovsky
DF	13	(Kazakhstan) Ermek Kuantayev
MF	16	(Kazakhstan) Oybek Baltabaev		(substituted on) 90+1'
DF	19	(Kazakhstan) Stanislav Lunin
FW	21	(Norway) Chuma Anene		(substituted on) 86'
MF	58	(Kazakhstan) Aleksandr Sokolenko		(substituted on) 65'
Manager:
(Spain) Carlos Ferrer

GK	34	(Kazakhstan) Zhasur Narzikulov
DF	3	(Georgia (country)) Ucha Lobjanidze
DF	5	(Ukraine) Rizvan Ablitarov
DF	66	(Kazakhstan) Anton Chichulin	(substituted off) 86'
DF	77	(Kazakhstan) Eldar Abdrakhmanov
MF	10	(Kazakhstan) Marat Khairullin
MF	22	(Serbia) Novica Maksimović
MF	82	(Kazakhstan) Eduard Sergienko	(substituted off) 80'
MF	19	(Serbia) Jovan Đokić
FW	81	(Serbia) Predrag Sikimić
FW	9	(Georgia (country)) Vladimir Dvalishvili	(substituted off) 80'
Substitutes:
GK	20	(Kazakhstan) Andrey Pasechenko
MF	4	(Croatia) Jure Obšivač
MF	7	(Kazakhstan) Alisher Suley	(substituted on) 80'
MF	8	(Uzbekistan) Shavkat Salomov	(substituted on) 80'
DF	12	(Kazakhstan) Ruslan Esatov
MF	14	(Kazakhstan) Kuanish Kalmuratov
DF	28	(Kazakhstan) Zakhar Korobov
FW	32	(Kazakhstan) Daurenbek Tazhimbetov	(substituted on) 86'
MF	49	(Kazakhstan) Dauren Kayralliyev
Manager:
(Kazakhstan) Kuanysh Kabdulov
