= 2017 FC Atyrau season =

FC Atyrau
2017 season
- Chairman: Zheksenbai Kusainov
- Manager: Zoran Vulić (until 11 April); Sergei Pavlov (18 April-21 September) Kuanysh Kabdulov (from 21 September)
- Stadium: Munaishy Stadium
- Kazakhstan Premier League: 8th
- Kazakhstan Cup: Runners Up
- Top goalscorer: League: Novica Maksimović (7); All: Novica Maksimović (9)
Home colours	Away colours

The 2017 FC Atyrau season is the 17th successive season that the club will play in the Kazakhstan Premier League, the highest tier of association football in Kazakhstan.

== Season events ==
Prior top the start of the season, Zoran Vulić replaced Stoycho Mladenov as manager.

Vulić resigned from his position on 11 April citing family reasons, with Sergei Pavlov being announced as his replacement on 13 April 2017. Atyrau's away game against Aktobe on 16 April, was postponed as Aktobe's pitch at their stadium was not ready after an extended period of winter weather. Sergei Pavlov resigned as manager on 21 September with the club in 11th position.

== Squad ==
As of 11 July 2017

Note: Flags indicate national team as defined under FIFA eligibility rules; some limited exceptions apply. Players may hold more than one non-FIFA nationality.

No.	Pos.	Nation	Player
1	GK	KAZ	Azamat Zhomartov
2	DF	KAZ	Dauren Mazhitov
3	DF	GEO	Ucha Lobjanidze
4	MF	CRO	Jure Obšivač
5	DF	UKR	Rizvan Ablitarov
6	MF	KAZ	Altynbek Saparov
7	MF	KAZ	Alisher Suley
8	MF	UZB	Shavkat Salomov
9	FW	GEO	Vladimir Dvalishvili
10	MF	KAZ	Marat Khairullin
11	MF	KAZ	Aleksei Marov
12	DF	KAZ	Ruslan Esatov
13	MF	KAZ	Aibar Nurybekov
14	MF	KAZ	Kuanish Kalmuratov
17	MF	KAZ	Almas Armenov
18	DF	KAZ	Alibek Sakenov

No.	Pos.	Nation	Player
19	MF	SRB	Jovan Đokić
20	GK	KAZ	Andrey Pasechenko
21	MF	KAZ	Nauryzbek Zhagorov
22	MF	SRB	Novica Maksimović
24	DF	KAZ	Kuanish Eltezerov
26	GK	KAZ	Nurbolat Kalmenov
27	FW	KAZ	Bekzhan Abdrakhmanov
28	DF	KAZ	Zakhar Korobov
32	FW	KAZ	Daurenbek Tazhimbetov
34	GK	KAZ	Zhasur Narzikulov
49	MF	KAZ	Dauren Kayralliyev
66	DF	KAZ	Anton Chichulin
77	DF	KAZ	Eldar Abdrakhmanov
81	FW	SRB	Predrag Sikimić
82	MF	KAZ	Eduard Sergienko
95	DF	KAZ	Zhaksylyk Halelov

== Transfers ==
=== Winter ===
In: Note: Flags indicate national team as defined under FIFA eligibility rules; some limited exceptions apply. Players may hold more than one non-FIFA nationality.

No.	Pos.	Nation	Player
3	DF	GEO	Ucha Lobjanidze (from (Georgia (country)) Dinamo Tbilisi)
5	DF	KAZ	Vukašin Tomić (from (Serbia) Jagodina)
7	MF	KAZ	Alisher Suley (from (Kazakhstan) Taraz)
8	MF	UZB	Shavkat Salomov (from (Uzbekistan) Buxoro)
9	FW	GEO	Vladimir Dvalishvili (from (Georgia (country)) Dinamo Tbilisi)
10	MF	KAZ	Marat Khairullin
13	MF	KAZ	Aibar Nurybekov (from (Kazakhstan) Shakhter Karagandy)
14	DF	KAZ	Kuanish Kalmuratov (from (Kazakhstan) Kaisar)
17	MF	KAZ	Almas Armenia (from (Kazakhstan) Caspiy)
19	MF	SRB	Jovan Đokić (from (Serbia) Javor Ivanjica)
20	GK	KAZ	Andrey Pasechenko (from (Kazakhstan) Zhetysu)
23	DF	KAZ	Miras Tuliyev (from (Kazakhstan) Okzhetpes)
26	GK	KAZ	Nurbolat Kalmenov (from (Kazakhstan) Zhetysu)
27	MF	KAZ	Bekzhan Onzhan
28	DF	KAZ	Zakhar Korobov (from (Kazakhstan) Akzhayik)
49	MF	KAZ	Dauren Kayralliev (from (Kazakhstan) Caspiy)
55	FW	CRO	Ivan Rodić (from (Ukraine) Metalist Kharkiv)
66	MF	KAZ	Anton Chichulin
77	DF	KAZ	Eldar Abdrakhmanov (from (Kazakhstan) Akzhayik)
81	MF	KAZ	Vitali Li (from (Kazakhstan) Kairat)
85	DF	KAZ	Zhaksylyk Halel (from (Kazakhstan) Altai Semey)

Out: Note: Flags indicate national team as defined under FIFA eligibility rules; some limited exceptions apply. Players may hold more than one non-FIFA nationality.

No.	Pos.	Nation	Player
5	DF	KAZ	Aleksei Muldarov (to (Kazakhstan) Kaisar)
7	MF	CMR	Guy Essame
8	DF	KAZ	Valentin Chureyev (to (Kazakhstan) Kaisar)
9	MF	UKR	Volodymyr Arzhanov (to (Kazakhstan) Kaisar)
10	MF	KAZ	Pavel Shabalin (to (Kazakhstan) Irtysh Pavlodar)
11	MF	UKR	Vyacheslav Sharpar (to (Ukraine) Vorskla Poltava)
13	FW	BLR	Alyaksandr Makas (to (Belarus) Torpedo-BelAZ Zhodino)
17	MF	KAZ	Ulan Konysbayev
19	MF	KAZ	Valeri Korobkin (to (Kazakhstan) Kaisar)
21	DF	MKD	Aleksandar Damčevski (to (Hungary) Mezőkövesd-Zsóry)
26	FW	POL	Przemysław Trytko (to (Poland) Arka Gdynia)
28	DF	KAZ	Vladislav Kuzmin
29	DF	KAZ	Berik Aitbayev (to (Kazakhstan) Aktobe)
30	MF	ROU	Alexandru Curtean (to (Romania) Gaz Metan Mediaș)
33	DF	CMR	Abdel Lamanje (to (Kazakhstan) Kaisar)
35	GK	KAZ	Ramil Nurmukhametov (to (Kazakhstan) Ordabasy)
77	FW	KAZ	Kasymkhan Nakpayev
96	FW	KAZ	Maxim Fedin (to (Kazakhstan) Okzhetpes)

=== Summer ===
In: Note: Flags indicate national team as defined under FIFA eligibility rules; some limited exceptions apply. Players may hold more than one non-FIFA nationality.

No.	Pos.	Nation	Player
5	DF	UKR	Rizvan Ablitarov (from (Ukraine) Chornomorets Odesa)
18	DF	KAZ	Alibek Sakenov
24	DF	KAZ	Kuanish Eltezerov (from (Kazakhstan) Aktobe)
32	FW	KAZ	Daurenbek Tazhimbetov (from (Kazakhstan) Shakhter Karagandy)
81	FW	SRB	Predrag Sikimić (from (Serbia) Red Star Belgrade)
82	MF	KAZ	Eduard Sergienko (from (Kazakhstan) Akzhayik)

Out: Note: Flags indicate national team as defined under FIFA eligibility rules; some limited exceptions apply. Players may hold more than one non-FIFA nationality.

No.	Pos.	Nation	Player
5	DF	SRB	Vukašin Tomić
18	MF	KAZ	Vitali Li (to (Kazakhstan) Ordabasy)
23	MF	KAZ	Miras Tuliyev (to (Kazakhstan) Irtysh Pavlodar)
55	FW	CRO	Ivan Rodić

== Competitions ==
=== Kazakhstan Premier League ===
==== Results summary ====
Overall								Home						Away					
Pld	W	D	L	GF	GA	GD	Pts	W	D	L	GF	GA	GD	W	D	L	GF	GA	GD
33	10	8	15	33	54	−21	38	8	4	4	23	18	+5	2	4	11	10	36	−26

Last updated: 5 November 2017.
Source: See Results

==== Results by round ====
Round	1	2	3	4	5	6	7	8	9	10	11	12	13	14	15	16	17	18	19	20	21	22	23	24	25	26	27	28	29	30	31	32	33
Ground	A	A	H	A	H	H	A	H	H	H	A	A	H	A	A	H	A	H	A	A	H	H	H	A	H	A	H	A	A	H	A	H	A
Result	L	D	L	D	L	D	W	W	W	D	L	D	W	L	L	W	L	L	L	D	W	W	D	L	L	L	D	L	W	W	L	W	L
Position	12	12	12	12	12	12	12	12	9	9	9	8	7	7	9	7	9	10	10	10	9	8	9	9	9	9	9	11	8	8	8	8	8

Source: See Results
A = Away; H = Home; W = Win; D = Draw; L = Loss

==== Results ====
8 March 2017 1	Tobol	3 – 0	Atyrau	Kostanay
14:00 (UTC+6)	Shchotkin 14', 58', 64'	Summary	Lobjanidze (yellow card) 33'	Stadium: Stadion Zatobolets; Attendance: 3,500; Referee: Bagdat Abdullaev

12 March 2017 2	Ordabasy	1 – 1	Atyrau	Shymkent
15:00 (UTC+6)	B.Kozhabayev (yellow card) 50'; Kovalchuk (yellow card) 80'; M.Tolebek (yellow card) 83' (goal) 90+4'	Summary	Obšivač 83'	Stadium: Kazhymukan Munaitpasov Stadium; Attendance: 8,500; Referee: Bolat Karlibayev

18 March 2017 3	Atyrau	0 – 1	Irtysh Pavlodar	Atyrau
16:00 (UTC+6)	Z.Korobov (yellow card) 20'; Chichulin (yellow card) 50'	Summary	Tkachuk (yellow card) 59'; R.Yesimov (yellow card) 64'; António 88'	Stadium: Munaishy Stadium; Attendance: 3,000; Referee: Marat Iskakov

1 April 2017 4	Akzhayik	2 – 2	Atyrau	Oral
16:00 (UTC+6)	A.Shabaev (yellow card) 34'; M.Sapanov 64'; Arenas 70'; D.Tolebaev (yellow card) 84'	Summary	A.Marov (yellow card) 30'; Rodić (yellow card) 45+1'; Obšivač 57'; Đokić (yellow card) 60'; Maksimović 88' (pen.)	Stadium: Petr Atoyan Stadium; Attendance: 3,000; Referee: Bagdat Abdullaev

8 April 2017 5	Atyrau	0 – 1	Astana	Atyrau
16:00 (UTC+6)	Chichulin (yellow card) 10'	Summary	D.Zhalmukan (yellow card) 60'; Logvinenko 84'	Stadium: Munaishy Stadium; Attendance: 1,500; Referee: Daniyar Sakhi

12 April 2017 6	Atyrau	3 – 3	Shakhter Karagandy	Atyrau
16:00 (UTC+6)	Salomov 28' (yellow card) 65'; Đokić (yellow card) 56'; Obšivač 77'; Skorykh 83' (o.g.)	Summary	Tazhimbetov 11'; R.Khairullin 30'; O.Omirtaev 90+1'	Stadium: Munaishy Stadium; Attendance: 1,500; Referee: Furkhat Atazhanov

16 April 2017 7	Aktobe	–	Atyrau	Aktobe
(UTC+6)		[ Summary]		Stadium: Central Stadium

21 April 2017 8	Atyrau	–	Okzhetpes	Atyrau
(UTC+6)				Stadium: Munaishy Stadium

29 April 2017 9	Taraz	1 – 2	Atyrau	Taraz
18:00 (UTC+6)	Maurice (yellow card) 9'; Gorbanets (yellow card) 23'; B.Zaynutdinov (yellow card) 33' (goal) 72'; D.Babakhanov (yellow card) 62'	Report	Đokić (yellow card) 45+1'; V.Li 64'; Lobjanidze (yellow card) 75'; Chichulin (yellow card) 82'; Maksimović 87' (yellow card) 88'	Stadium: Central Stadium; Attendance: 3,200; Referee: Timur Kumashev

2 May 2017 10	Atyrau	1 – 0	Kaisar	Atyrau
18:00 (UTC+6)	Maksimović 49' (pen.); D.Kayralliyev (yellow card) 90+4'	Report	Graf (yellow card) 78'; V.Chureyev (yellow card) 89'	Stadium: Munaishy Stadium; Attendance: 2,500; Referee: Marat Iskakov

6 May 2017 11	Atyrau	2 – 1	Kairat	Atyrau
18:30 (UTC+6)	J.Vorogovsky 26' (o.g.); Dvalishvili 49'; E.Abdrakhmanov (yellow card) 66'; D.Kayralliyev (yellow card) 86'; Maksimović (yellow card) 90'	Report	Kuat (yellow card) 49'; Isael (yellow card) 61'; Turysbek 90+6'	Stadium: Munaishy Stadium; Attendance: 3,500; Referee: Aleksei Bobrov

14 May 2017 12	Atyrau	2 – 2	Ordabasy	Atyrau
19:00 (UTC+6)	E.Abdrakhmanov 52' (yellow card) 55'; Salomov 59' (yellow card) 75'; A.Pasechenko (yellow card) 84'	Report	Nusserbayev 14' (yellow card) 84'; E.Tungyshbaev (yellow card) 37'; Kovalchuk (yellow card) 44'; Nurgaliev 85' (pen.); T.Erlanov (yellow card) 90+1'	Stadium: Munaishy Stadium; Attendance: 7,500; Referee: Anatolyi Vishnichenko

17 May 2017 7	Aktobe	1 – 0	Atyrau	Aktobe
20:00 (UTC+6)	B.Baitana (yellow card) 7'; Shestakov (yellow card) 72'; Mamute 80' (pen.) (yellow card) 80'	Report	Obšivač (yellow card) 79'; Lobjanidze (yellow card) 85'; A.Marov (yellow card) 90+1'	Stadium: Central Stadium; Attendance: 5,500; Referee: Marat Iskakov

20 May 2017 13	Irtysh Pavlodar	1 – 1	Atyrau	Pavlodar
19:00 (UTC+6)	Kislitsyn 27'; Vorotnikov (yellow card) 72'	Report	Rodić (yellow card) 44'; Obšivač 68'; V.Li (yellow card) 69'; A.Saparov (yellow card) 80'; A.Pasechenko (yellow card) 90'	Stadium: Central Stadium; Attendance: 3,500; Referee: Aleksandr Aliyev

28 May 2017 14	Atyrau	2 – 0	Akzhayik	Atyrau
19:00 (UTC+6)	Maksimović (yellow card) 16'; Dvalishvili 30', 59'; E.Abdrakhmanov (yellow card) 73'	Report	B.Omarov (yellow card) 53'; Arenas (yellow card) 60'; K.Zarechny (yellow card) 69'; Govedarica (yellow card) 75'	Stadium: Munaishy Stadium; Attendance: 6,000; Referee: Askhat Abdanbayev

3 June 2017 15	Astana	4 – 0	Atyrau	Astana
18:00 (UTC+6)	Kabananga 22', 73'; Grahovac 62' (pen.); Twumasi 66'	Report	Khairullin (yellow card) 41'; A.Suley (yellow card) 79'; A.Saparov (yellow card) 87'	Stadium: Astana Arena; Attendance: 4,500; Referee: Aleksei Bobrov

17 June 2017 16	Shakhter Karagandy	2 – 0	Atyrau	Temirtau
19:00 (UTC+6)	Stanojević 1', 89'	Report	R.Esatov (yellow card) 81'	Stadium: Metallurg Stadium; Attendance: 300; Referee: Grigory Moskovchenko

25 June 2017 17	Atyrau	2 – 0	Aktobe	Atyrau
19:00 (UTC+6)	Sikimić (yellow card) 6'; Obšivač 81'; Maksimović 84' (pen.)	Report	B.Kairov (yellow card) 44'; Šimkovič (yellow card) 52'; S.Zhumagali (yellow card) 84'; Mamute (yellow card) 86'	Stadium: Munaishy Stadium; Attendance: 4,000; Referee: Aydin Rakhimbayev

1 July 2017 18	Okzhetpes	1 – 0	Atyrau	Shchuchinsk
18:00 (UTC+6)	Kozlov 55'; O.Nedashkovsky (yellow card) 85'	Report	D.Mazhitov (yellow card) 6'	Stadium: Zhaksy Stadium; Attendance: 300; Referee: Bagdat Abdullaev

8 July 2017 19	Atyrau	1 – 3	Taraz	Atyrau
20:00 (UTC+6)	E.Abdrakhmanov (yellow card) 25'; Obšivač (yellow card) 57'; Khairullin 64'	Report	Maurice 21', 71'; A.Taubay 75'	Stadium: Munaishy Stadium; Attendance: 4,500; Referee: Daniyar Sakhi

15 July 2017 20	Kaisar	2 – 0	Atyrau	Kyzylorda
19:00 (UTC+6)	Graf 33'; Arzhanov (yellow card) 51'; Coureur 90+3' (pen.)	Report	Tazhimbetov (yellow card) 58'; Sikimić (yellow card) 78'; D.Mazhitov (yellow card) 89'	Stadium: Gani Muratbayev Stadium; Attendance: 1,300; Referee: Artyom Kuchin

23 July 2017 21	Kairat	1 – 1	Atyrau	Almaty
20:00 (UTC+6)	Turysbek 75'	Report	Sikimić 71'; Khairullin (yellow card) 85'	Stadium: Central Stadium; Attendance: 6,800; Referee: Anatoyli Vishnichenko

26 July 2017 8	Atyrau	2 – 1	Okzhetpes	Atyrau
20:00 (UTC+6)	Khairullin 12'; Chichulin (yellow card) 37'; Lobjanidze (yellow card) 64'; E.Abdrakhmanov 77'; Maksimović (yellow card) 88'	Report	Horvat (yellow card) 35'; Gogua (yellow card) 37'; Freidgeimas (yellow card) 49'; T.Adyrbekov (yellow card) 61'; Buleshev 80'; Yurin (yellow card) 84'	Stadium: Munaishy Stadium; Attendance: 3,000; Referee: Georgiy Chekhovskiy

29 July 2017 22	Atyrau	1 – 0	Tobol	Atyrau
20:00 (UTC+6)	Ablitarov (yellow card) 7'; Dvalishvili (yellow card) 13'; Sikimić 28' (yellow card) 62'; Narzikulov (yellow card) 45'; Đokić (yellow card) 47' (yellow-red card) 80'	Report	Mukhutdinov (yellow card) 13'; G.Sartakov (yellow card) 41'	Stadium: Munaishy Stadium; Attendance: 3,500; Referee: Aleksandr Aliyev

13 August 2017 23	Atyrau	0 – 0	Irtysh Pavlodar	Atyrau
19:00 (UTC+6)	E.Abdrakhmanov (yellow card) 90+1'	Report	A.Darabayev (yellow card) 61'; Kislitsyn (yellow card) 67'	Stadium: Munaishy Stadium; Attendance: 2,500; Referee: Artyom Kuchin

20 August 2017 24	Ordabasy	2 – 0	Atyrau	Shymkent
18:30 (UTC+6)	E.Tungyshbaev (yellow card) 29' (goal) 68'; Nusserbayev 86'	Report	Sikimić (yellow card) 5'; A.Nurybekov (yellow card) 45+2'; Maksimović (yellow card) 66'; Khairullin (yellow card) 77'	Stadium: Kazhymukan Munaitpasov Stadium; Attendance: 3,200; Referee: Aydin Rakhimbayev

26 August 2017 25	Atyrau	0 – 1	Kairat	Atyrau
19:00 (UTC+6)	Ablitarov (yellow card) 71'; Dvalishvili (yellow card) 71'	Report	Suyumbayev (yellow card) 71'; Bakayev (yellow card) 71'; Anene 74'	Stadium: Munaishy Stadium; Attendance: 3,500; Referee: Igor Aleshin

9 September 2017 26	Astana	7 – 0	Atyrau	Astana
17:00 (UTC+6)	Muzhikov 28', 38'; Murtazayev 44'; Tomasov 60', 89'; Grahovac 69'; Twumasi 87'	Report	A.Suley (yellow card) 43'	Stadium: Astana Arena; Attendance: 2,500; Referee: Aleksandr Gauzer

16 September 2017 27	Atyrau	2 – 2	Aktobe	Atyrau
18:30 (UTC+6)	Sikimić 21'; Khairullin (yellow card) 33'; Maksimović 43'; Đokić (yellow card) 45'; Chichulin (yellow card) 60'; Salomov (yellow card) 80'	Report	Valiullin 13'; Šimkovič 30' (yellow card) 59'; Kolčák (yellow card) 56'; B.Kairov (yellow card) 85'	Stadium: Munaishy Stadium; Attendance: 3,000; Referee: Daniyar Sakhi

20 September 2017 30	Akzhayik	1 – 0	Atyrau	Oral
18:00 (UTC+6)	Y.Pertsukh 79'	Report		Stadium: Petr Atoyan Stadium; Attendance: 3,000; Referee: Aydin Rakhimbayev

24 September 2017 28	Okzhetpes	1 – 2	Atyrau	Shchuchinsk
15:30 (UTC+6)	Freidgeimas 45'; Buleshev (yellow card) 60'	Report	Sikimić 15'; Ablitarov 53'; A.Pasechenko (yellow card) 90+2'	Stadium: Zhaksy Stadium; Attendance: 200; Referee: Marat Iskakov

30 September 2017 29	Atyrau	3 – 1	Shakhter Karagandy	Atyrau
17:00 (UTC+6)	Ablitarov 14'; Maksimović 55'; E.Abdrakhmanov 71'; Đokić (yellow card) 75'; Dvalishvili (yellow card) 76'	Report	I.Pikalkin 22'; Shakhmetov (yellow card) 54'; Y.Tarasov (yellow card) 84'	Stadium: Munaishy Stadium; Attendance: 3,000; Referee: Georgiy Chekhovskiy

22 October 2017 31	Kaisar	4 – 1	Atyrau	Kyzylorda
15:00 (UTC+6)	M.Bayzhanov 54'; Arzhanov 62'; Graf (yellow card) 83'; Coureur 86'; Lamanje 90'	Report	Maksimović 45+1'; D.Kayralliev (yellow card) 64'	Stadium: Gani Muratbayev Stadium; Attendance: 2,000; Referee: Aleksandr Gauzer

28 October 2017 32	Atyrau	3 – 2	Taraz	Atyrau
15:00 (UTC+6)	Sikimić 71'; Khairullin 77'; Ablitarov 81'	Report	Mané (yellow card) 11'; Kozhamberdi (yellow card) 68'; B.Zaynutdinov 69', 79'	Stadium: Munaishy Stadium; Attendance: 2,500; Referee: Artyom Kuchin

5 November 2017 33	Tobol	2 – 0	Atyrau	Kostanay
15:00 (UTC+6)	Shchotkin 10'; Moldakaraev (yellow card) 14'; Žulpa 62'	Report		Stadium: Central Stadium; Attendance: 7,000; Referee: Timur Kumashev

==== League table ====
Pos	Team	Pld	W	D	L	GF	GA	GD	Pts	Qualification or relegation
6	Kaisar	33	11	9	13	30	36	−6	42	
7	Shakhter Karagandy	33	12	4	17	36	50	−14	40	
8	Atyrau (Note: Atyrau started the season with –9 points as a punishment for unpaid debts to former manager Zoran Filipović. On 24 April 2017, Atyrau had six points returned to after they cleared their debt to Filipović, with three points retained due to debts to Jonathas.)	33	10	8	15	34	54	−20	35	
9	Aktobe	33	8	9	16	38	46	−8	33	
10	Akzhayik (O)	33	7	9	17	29	47	−18	30	Qualification for the relegation play-offs

Source: UEFA, Soccerway
Rules for classification: 1) Points; 2) Head-to-head points; 3) Head-to-head matches won; 4) Head-to-head goal difference; 5) Head-to-head goals scored; 6) Head-to-head away goals scored; 7) Goal difference; 8) Matches won; 9) Goals scored; 10) Away goals scored; 11) Draw.
(O) Play-off winners

=== Kazakhstan Cup ===
19 April 2017 Last 16	Kyran	1 – 2	Atyrau	Shymkent
14:00 (UTC+6)	A.Alipbek (yellow card) 30'; A.Zhaksybek 26' (yellow card) 37'; A.Abutov (yellow card) 46'; A.Suleymanov (yellow card) 73'; B.Boribay (yellow card) 90'	Report	Obšivač (yellow card) 41'; E.Abdrakhmanov (yellow card) 45'; Maksimović 45+3' (pen.); Lobjanidze (yellow card) 58'; D.Kayralliyev 84'	Stadium: Lokomotive Stadium; Attendance: 700; Referee: Stanislav Lesiv

10 May 2017 Quarterfinal	Atyrau	1 – 0 (a.e.t.)	Aktobe	Atyrau
18:30 (UTC+6)	Dvalishvili (yellow card) 18'; D.Kayralliev (yellow card) 74'; A.Nurybekov (yellow card) 104'; Rodić 119' (yellow card) 120'; E.Abdrakhmanov (yellow card) 121'	Report	A.Shurigin (yellow card) 13'; Volovyk (yellow card) 69'; A.Totay (yellow card) 80'; Gueye (yellow card) 106'	Stadium: Munaishy Stadium; Attendance: 4,000; Referee: Artyom Kuchin

24 May 2017 Semifinal 1st leg	Shakhter Karagandy	1 – 0	Atyrau	Temirtau
17:00 (UTC+6)	Tazhimbetov 17'; M.Gabyshev (yellow card) 64'	Report		Stadium: Metallurg Stadium; Attendance: 1,000; Referee: Aydin Rakhimbayev

21 June 2017 Semifinal 2nd leg	Atyrau	3 – 0 (3 – 1 agg.)	Shakhter Karagandy	Atyrau
19:00 (UTC+6)	Maksimović 47' (pen.); Dvalishvili 68' (yellow card) 71'; E.Abdrakhmanov (yellow card) 72'; Salomov (yellow card) 81'; D.Mazhitov (yellow card) 84'; A.Nurybekov 90'	Report	Szöke (yellow card) 47'; Shakhmetov (yellow card) 59'	Stadium: Munaishy Stadium; Attendance: 4,500; Referee: Aleksandr Aliyev

==== Final ====
14 October 2017	Kairat	1 – 0	Atyrau	Aktobe
19:00 (UTC+6)	Gohou 70' (red card) 87'	Report		Stadium: Central Stadium; Attendance: 10,400; Referee: Artyom Kuchin

== Squad statistics ==
As of Match played 5 November 2017

=== Appearances and goals ===
No.	Pos	Nat	Player	Total		Premier League		Kazakhstan Cup	
No.	Pos	Nat	Player	Apps	Goals	Apps	Goals	Apps	Goals
2	DF	(Kazakhstan) KAZ	Dauren Mazhitov	16	0	12+2	0	2	0
3	DF	(Georgia (country)) GEO	Ucha Lobjanidze	27	0	23	0	4	0
4	MF	(Croatia) CRO	Jure Obšivač	32	5	28	5	4	0
5	DF	(Ukraine) UKR	Rizvan Ablitarov	17	3	15	3	2	0
6	MF	(Kazakhstan) KAZ	Altynbek Saparov	9	0	6+2	0	1	0
7	MF	(Kazakhstan) KAZ	Alisher Suley	31	0	7+19	0	1+4	0
8	MF	(Uzbekistan) UZB	Shavkat Salomov	29	2	15+10	2	2+2	0
9	FW	(Georgia (country)) GEO	Vladimir Dvalishvili	35	4	26+5	3	4	1
10	MF	(Kazakhstan) KAZ	Marat Khairullin	35	3	29+2	3	4	0
11	MF	(Kazakhstan) KAZ	Aleksei Marov	7	0	4+2	0	0+1	0
12	DF	(Kazakhstan) KAZ	Ruslan Esatov	6	0	4+2	0	0	0
13	MF	(Kazakhstan) KAZ	Aibar Nurybekov	13	1	6+4	0	1+2	1
14	MF	(Kazakhstan) KAZ	Kuanish Kalmuratov	21	0	11+7	0	2+1	0
19	MF	(Serbia) SRB	Jovan Đokić	34	0	25+5	0	4	0
20	GK	(Kazakhstan) KAZ	Andrey Pasechenko	27	0	24	0	3	0
21	MF	(Kazakhstan) KAZ	Nauryzbek Zhagorov	3	0	0+3	0	0	0
22	MF	(Serbia) SRB	Novica Maksimović	32	9	26+1	7	5	2
27	FW	(Kazakhstan) KAZ	Bekzhan Abdrakhmanov	1	0	0+1	0	0	0
28	DF	(Kazakhstan) KAZ	Zakhar Korobov	16	0	9+4	0	2+1	0
32	FW	(Kazakhstan) KAZ	Daurenbek Tazhimbetov	10	0	4+5	0	0+1	0
34	GK	(Kazakhstan) KAZ	Zhasur Narzikulov	11	0	9	0	2	0
49	MF	(Kazakhstan) KAZ	Dauren Kayralliyev	18	1	6+9	0	1+2	1
66	DF	(Kazakhstan) KAZ	Anton Chichulin	17	0	16	0	1	0
77	DF	(Kazakhstan) KAZ	Eldar Abdrakhmanov	31	3	24+3	3	4	0
81	FW	(Serbia) SRB	Predrag Sikimić	16	5	13+2	5	1	0
82	MF	(Kazakhstan) KAZ	Eduard Sergienko	14	0	11+1	0	2	0
Players away from Atyrau on loan:
Players who left Atyrau during the season:
5	DF	(Serbia) SRB	Vukašin Tomić	2	0	2	0	0	0
18	MF	(Kazakhstan) KAZ	Vitali Li	12	1	6+4	1	2	0
55	FW	(Croatia) CRO	Ivan Rodić	7	1	2+3	0	0+2	1

=== Goal scorers ===
Place	Position	Nation	Number	Name	Premier League	Kazakhstan Cup	Total
1	MF	(Serbia)	22	Novica Maksimović	7	2	9
2	MF	(Croatia)	4	Jure Obšivač	5	0	5
2	FW	(Serbia)	81	Predrag Sikimić	5	0	5
4	FW	(Georgia (country))	9	Vladimir Dvalishvili	3	1	4
5	DF	(Kazakhstan)	77	Eldar Abdrakhmanov	3	0	3
5	MF	(Kazakhstan)	10	Marat Khairullin	3	0	3
5	DF	(Ukraine)	5	Rizvan Ablitarov	3	0	3
8	MF	(Uzbekistan)	8	Shavkat Salomov	2	0	2
8				Own goal	2	0	2
10	MF	(Kazakhstan)	18	Vitali Li	1	0	1
10	MF	(Kazakhstan)	49	Dauren Kayralliyev	0	1	1
10	FW	(Croatia)	55	Ivan Rodić	0	1	1
10	MF	(Kazakhstan)	13	Aibar Nurybekov	0	1	1
				TOTALS	34	6	40

=== Disciplinary record ===
Number	Nation	Position	Name	Premier League		Kazakhstan Cup		Total	
Number	Nation	Position	Name	Yellow card	Red card	Yellow card	Red card	Yellow card	Red card
2	(Kazakhstan)	DF	Dauren Mazhitov	2	0	1	0	3	0
3	(Georgia (country))	DF	Ucha Lobjanidze	4	0	1	0	5	0
4	(Croatia)	MF	Jure Obšivač	2	0	1	0	3	0
5	(Ukraine)	DF	Rizvan Ablitarov	2	0	0	0	2	0
6	(Kazakhstan)	DF	Altynbek Saparov	2	0	0	0	2	0
7	(Kazakhstan)	MF	Alisher Suley	2	0	0	0	2	0
8	(Uzbekistan)	MF	Shavkat Salomov	3	0	1	0	4	0
9	(Georgia (country))	FW	Vladimir Dvalishvili	3	0	2	0	5	0
10	(Kazakhstan)	MF	Marat Khairullin	4	0	0	0	4	0
11	(Kazakhstan)	MF	Aleksei Marov	2	0	0	0	2	0
12	(Kazakhstan)	DF	Ruslan Esatov	1	0	0	0	1	0
13	(Kazakhstan)	MF	Aibar Nurybekov	1	0	1	0	2	0
18	(Kazakhstan)	MF	Vitali Li	1	0	0	0	1	0
19	(Serbia)	MF	Jovan Đokić	6	1	0	0	6	1
20	(Kazakhstan)	GK	Andrey Pasechenko	3	0	0	0	3	0
22	(Serbia)	MF	Novica Maksimović	5	0	0	0	5	0
28	(Kazakhstan)	DF	Zakhar Korobov	2	0	0	0	2	0
32	(Kazakhstan)	FW	Daurenbek Tazhimbetov	1	0	0	0	1	0
34	(Uzbekistan)	GK	Zhasur Narzikulov	1	0	0	0	1	0
49	(Kazakhstan)	MF	Dauren Kayralliyev	3	0	1	0	4	0
55	(Croatia)	FW	Ivan Rodić	2	0	1	0	3	0
66	(Kazakhstan)	DF	Anton Chichulin	5	0	0	0	5	0
77	(Kazakhstan)	DF	Eldar Abdrakhmanov	5	0	3	0	8	0
81	(Serbia)	FW	Predrag Sikimić	4	0	0	0	4	0
			TOTALS	65	1	12	0	77	1
