= 2017 Kazakhstan Cup =

Tournament details
- Country: Kazakhstan
- Teams: 21

Final positions
- Champions: Kairat
- Runners-up: Atyrau

Tournament statistics
- Matches played: 24
- Goals scored: 56 (2.33 per match)
- Top goal scorer: Gerard Gohou (3)

The 2017 Kazakhstan Cup was the 26th season of the Kazakhstan Cup, the annual nationwide football cup competition of Kazakhstan since the independence of the country.

== Participating clubs ==
The following 21 teams qualified for the competition:

Premier League all clubs of season 2017	First Division; Seven clubs of season 2017	Second Division; Two clubs of season 2017
Aktobe; Akzhayik; Astana; Atyrau; Taraz; Irtysh Pavlodar; Kairat; Kaisar; Okzhetpes; Ordabasy; Shakhter Karagandy; Tobol	~~Altai Semey~~; Caspiy Aktau; Ekibastuz; Kyran Shymkent; Kyzylzhar; Makhtaaral; Zhetysu	Ruzaevka; Sports School №7

=== Schedule ===
The rounds of the 2017 competition are scheduled as follows:

- Group Stages: 28 March - 6 April 2017
- Last 16:
- Quarterfinal:
- Semifinal:
- Final:

== Group stages ==
The following groups stages were announced on 22 February 2017.

=== Group A ===
Pos	Team	Pld	W	D	L	GF	GA	GD	Pts	Qualification
1	Makhtaaral	2	1	1	0	5	3	+2	4	Advanced to Last 16
2	Kyzylzhar	2	1	1	0	3	2	+1	4	Advanced to Last 16
3	Sports School №7	2	0	0	2	3	6	−3	0	

Updated to match(es) played on 28 March 2017. Source: PFLK

28 March 2017	Makhtaaral	4 – 2	Sports School №7	Atakent
15:00 (UTC+6)	E.Oralbai 22', 41'; A.Makhambetov 51'; T.Bakhtiari (yellow card) 53' (goal) 75'	Summary	R.Zhakudaev 2' (yellow card) 81'; A.Temirlan 12'; A.Sattar (yellow card) 18'; A.Pazylhan (yellow card) 69'	Attendance: 2,200; Referee: Bulat Sariyev

1 April 2017	Kyzylzhar	1 – 1	Makhtaaral	Shymkent
16:00 (UTC+6)	A.Sokolenko 81'; T.Zakirov (yellow card) 31'; M.Aubakirov (yellow card) 80'	Summary	G.Alekperzade 39'; D.Aripov (yellow card) 15'; B.Aulabaev (yellow card) 56'	Stadium: Ulan; Attendance: 100; Referee: Mikhail Bildinov

4 April 2017	Sports School №7	1 – 2	Kyzylzhar	Shymkent
15:00 (UTC+6)	R.Zhakudaev 45' (pen.); M.Abdesh (yellow card) 33' (yellow-red card) 86'; A.Pazylhan (yellow card) 90+2'	Summary	A.Sokolenko 52'; T.Muldinov 76'	Stadium: BIIK; Attendance: 50; Referee: Saken Bayimbet

=== Group B ===
Pos	Team	Pld	W	D	L	GF	GA	GD	Pts	Qualification
1	Kyran	1	1	0	0	2	0	+2	3	Advanced to Last 16
2	Ekibastuz	1	0	0	1	0	2	−2	0	
3	Altai Semey	0	0	0	0	0	0	0	0	

Updated to match(es) played on 29 March 2017. Source: PFLK

29 March 2017	Ekibastuz	0 – 2	Kyran	Shymkent
15:00 (UTC+6)	G.Bersugurov (yellow card) 34'; A.Bralin (yellow card) 55'	Summary	A.Abutov 29', 86' (yellow card) 84'	Stadium: BIIK; Attendance: 200; Referee: Askhat Abdanbaev

2 April 2017	Altai Semey	Cancelled	Ekibastuz
17:00 (UTC+6)		[Summary]

5 April 2017	Kyran	Cancelled	Altai Semey
15:00 (UTC+6)		[Summary]

On March 30, Altai Semey withdrew from Cup.

=== Group C ===
Pos	Team	Pld	W	D	L	GF	GA	GD	Pts	Qualification
1	Zhetysu	2	2	0	0	3	1	+2	6	Advanced to Last 16
2	Caspiy	2	1	0	1	1	1	0	3	
3	FC Ruzaevka	2	0	0	2	1	3	−2	0	

Updated to match(es) played on 30 March 2017. Source: PFLK

30 March 2017	Caspiy	1 – 0	Ruzaevka	Shymkent
15:00 (UTC+6)	E.Eshenkul 5'; E.Kadyrbaev (yellow card) 75'	Summary	S.Kulmaganbetov (yellow card) 30'; M.Muhametkozhin (yellow card) 77' (yellow-red card) 89'	Stadium: BIIK; Attendance: 100; Referee: Viktor Antonov

3 April 2017	Zhetysu	1 – 0	Caspiy	Shymkent
15:00 (UTC+6)	Kasyanov 7'; V.Serdykov (yellow card) 29'; Burghiu (yellow card) 80'	Summary	Limane (yellow card) 17'; B.Rymtaev (yellow card) 31'; M.Chalkin (yellow card) 51'	Stadium: BIIK; Attendance: 100; Referee: Stanislav Lesiv

6 April 2017	Ruzaevka	1 – 2	Zhetysu	Shymkent
14:00 (UTC+6)	V.Pokatilov 45' (o.g.); D.Suyunov (yellow card) 69'	Summary	Hromțov 10'; O.Kerimzhanov (yellow card) 79'; V.Serdykov 90+3'	Stadium: Ulan; Attendance: 50; Referee: Ivan Filatov

== Last 16 ==
19 April 2017	Kyran	1 – 2	Atyrau	Shymkent
14:00 (UTC+6)	A.Alipbek (yellow card) 30'; A.Zhaksybek 26' (yellow card) 37'; A.Abutov (yellow card) 46'; A.Suleymanov (yellow card) 73'; B.Boribay (yellow card) 90'	Summary	Obšivač (yellow card) 41'; E.Abdrakhmanov (yellow card) 45'; Maksimović 45+3' (pen.); Lobjanidze (yellow card) 58'; D.Kayralliyev 84'	Stadium: Lokomotive Stadium; Attendance: 700; Referee: Stanislav Lesiv

19 April 2017	Makhtaaral	1 – 4	Okzhetpes	Atakent
15:00 (UTC+6)	D.Zverev (yellow card) 20'; E.Oralbay (yellow card) 40'; E.Nabiev 59'; A.Makhambetov (yellow card) 80'; R.Saurambaev (yellow card) 80'; K.Shubaev (yellow card) 90+1'	Summary	Marochkin 14'; Fedin 21' (pen.); Yurin 26'; Chertov 43'; Genkov (yellow card) 80'	Stadium: Stadion Alpamis Batyr; Attendance: 1,500; Referee: Ruslan Omarov

19 April 2017	Kyzylzhar	0 – 1	Ordabasy	Petropavl
16:00 (UTC+6)	I.Aitov (yellow card) 44'	Summary	Gogua (yellow card) 22' (goal) 59' (pen.); S.Zhumahanov (yellow card) 90'; Ashirbekov (yellow card) 90+3'	Stadium: Avangard Stadium; Attendance: 8,000; Referee: Bolat Saryev

19 April 2017	Zhetysu	2 – 1	Astana	Taldykorgan
16:00 (UTC+6)	S.Ibraev (yellow card) 43'; Hromțov 75'; A.Shakin 86'; A.Shabanov (yellow card) 90+3'	Summary	Beisebekov 5'	Stadium: Zhetysu Stadium; Attendance: 1,500; Referee: Dmitiry Bystrov

19 April 2017	Tobol	1 – 2	Shakhter Karagandy	Kostanay
17:30 (UTC+6)	Kassaï (yellow card) 37'; Zhangylyshbay 85'	Summary	Szöke 15'; A.Tattybaev 39'; Skorykh (yellow card) 83'	Stadium: Central Stadium; Attendance: 2,000; Referee: Bagdat Abdullaev

19 April 2017	Akzhayik	0 – 0 (a.e.t.) (4 –5 p)	Aktobe	Oral
18:00 (UTC+6)	S.Chulagov (yellow card) 9'; Rubio (yellow card) 17'; I.Antipov (yellow card) 35'; B.Omarov (yellow card) 37'	Summary	Torres (yellow card) 19'; R.Rozybakiyev (yellow card) 112'	Stadium: Petr Atoyan Stadium; Attendance: 2,300; Referee: Marat Iskakov
	Penalties
	A.Shabaev (penalty scored); Y.Pertsukh (penalty scored); E.Tapalov (penalty scored); Valiullin (penalty missed); B.Omarov (penalty scored)		Juninho (penalty scored); Cassiano (penalty scored); A.Kakimov (penalty scored); Zyankovich (penalty scored); Volovyk (penalty scored)

19 April 2017	Irtysh Pavlodar	3 – 2 (a.e.t.)	Kaisar	Pavlodar
19:00 (UTC+6)	Fofana 31'; Chernyshov (yellow card) 65'; Dja Djédjé 82'; António 110'; Kislitsyn (yellow card) 119'	Summary	Kukeyev (yellow card) 30' (red card) 120+3'; R.Sakhalbayev (yellow card) 63' (yellow-red card) 73'; Narzildaev 66'; E.Goryachi (yellow card) 73'; E.Altynbekov 79'; A.Zhakhayev (yellow card) 82'; E.Seitkanov (yellow card) 87'; Muldarov (yellow card) 115'; Grigorenko (yellow card) 115'; O.Altaev (yellow card) 116'	Stadium: Central Stadium; Attendance: 6,000; Referee: Aleksandr Aliyev

19 April 2017	Kairat	2 – 0	Taraz	Almaty
19:30 (UTC+6)	Zhukov 33' (yellow card) 50'; Iličević 45+1'	Summary	Kozhamberdi (yellow card) 19' (yellow-red card) 29'; Shipitsin (yellow card) 45+1'	Stadium: Central Stadium; Attendance: 6,000; Referee: Denis Izmailov

== Quarterfinal ==
10 May 2017	Okzhetpes	1 – 2	Shakhter Karagandy	Astana
17:00 (UTC+6)	Chertov (yellow card) 47'; S.Shaff 74'; Kozlov (yellow card) 90+4'	Report	Kadio 51'; Stanojević 54'; R.Khairullin (yellow card) 68'; Aiyegbusi (yellow card) 90+5'	Stadium: Astana Arena; Attendance: 700

10 May 2017	Zhetysu	0 – 1	Ordabasy	Taldykorgan
17:00 (UTC+6)	S.Sagyndykov (yellow card) 69'	Report	S.Zhumahanov (yellow card) 59'; B.Beisenov 64'	Stadium: Zhetysu Stadium; Attendance: 1,500

10 May 2017	Atyrau	1 – 0 (a.e.t.)	Aktobe	Atyrau
18:30 (UTC+6)	Dvalishvili (yellow card) 18'; D.Kayralliev (yellow card) 74'; A.Nurybekov (yellow card) 104'; Rodić 119' (yellow card) 120'; E.Abdrakhmanov (yellow card) 121'	Report	A.Shurigin (yellow card) 13'; Volovyk (yellow card) 69'; A.Totay (yellow card) 80'; Gueye (yellow card) 106'	Stadium: Munaishy Stadium; Attendance: 4,000; Referee: Artyom Kuchin

10 May 2017	Kairat	2 – 0	Irtysh Pavlodar	Almaty
20:00 (UTC+6)	Gohou 8'; Iličević 44'; Kuat (red card) 89'; Suyumbayev (yellow card) 89'	Report	Dja Djédjé (yellow card) 41'; Fonseca (red card) 89'	Stadium: Central Stadium; Attendance: 6,500

== Semifinals ==
The four winners from the quarterfinals were drawn into two two-legged ties.

24 May 2017	Ordabasy	0 – 0	Kairat	Shymkent
17:30 (UTC+6)	Simčević (yellow card) 84'	Report	Elek (yellow card) 42'; Akhmetov (yellow card) 45+2' (yellow-red card) 72'; Anene (yellow card) 90+3'	Stadium: Kazhymukan Munaitpasov Stadium; Attendance: 3,000; Referee: Igor Aleshin

21 June 2017	Kairat	3 – 1 (3 – 1 agg.)	Ordabasy	Almaty
19:00 (UTC+6)	Islamkhan 23'; Arshavin 30'; Gohou 37'	Report	T.Erlanov (yellow card) 50' (yellow-red card) 84'; Diakate (yellow card) 80'; Fontanello (yellow card) 85'; V.Li 90+2' (pen.)	Stadium: Central Stadium; Attendance: 6,800; Referee: Artyom Kuchin

24 May 2017	Shakhter Karagandy	1 – 0	Atyrau	Temirtau
17:00 (UTC+6)	Tazhimbetov 17'; M.Gabyshev (yellow card) 64'	Report		Stadium: Metallurg Stadium; Attendance: 1,000; Referee: Aydin Rakhimbayev

21 June 2017	Atyrau	3 – 0 (3 – 1 agg.)	Shakhter Karagandy	Atyrau
19:00 (UTC+6)	Maksimović 47' (pen.); Dvalishvili 68' (yellow card) 71'; E.Abdrakhmanov (yellow card) 72'; Salomov (yellow card) 81'; D.Mazhitov (yellow card) 84'; A.Nurybekov 90'	Report	Szöke (yellow card) 47'; Shakhmetov (yellow card) 59'	Stadium: Munaishy Stadium; Attendance: 4,500; Referee: Aleksandr Aliyev

== Final ==
14 October 2017
19:00 (UTC+6)

Kairat	1 – 0	Atyrau
Gohou 70' (red card) 87'	Report

Central Stadium, Aktobe
Attendance: 10,400
Referee: Artyom Kuchin

== Scorers ==
As of match played 14 October 2017

3 goals:

- (Ivory Coast) Gerard Gohou, Kairat

2 goals:

- (Serbia) Novica Maksimović, Atyrau
- (Croatia) Ivo Iličević, Kairat
- (Kazakhstan) Askar Abutov, Kyran
- (Kazakhstan) Aleksandr Sokolenko, Kyzylzhar
- (Kazakhstan) Edige Oralbai, Makhtaaral
- (Kazakhstan) Rahmatulla Zhakudaev, Sports School №7
- (Moldova) Oleg Hromțov, Zhetysu

1 goals:

- (Kazakhstan) Abzal Beisebekov, Astana
- (Croatia) Ivan Rodić, Atyrau
- (Georgia (country)) Vladimir Dvalishvili, Atyrau
- (Kazakhstan) Dauren Kayralliyev, Atyrau
- (Kazakhstan) Aibar Nurybekov, Atyrau
- (Kazakhstan) Erkasym Eshenkul, Caspiy
- (Brazil) Rodrigo António, Irtysh Pavlodar
- (Ivory Coast) Franck Dja Djédjé, Irtysh Pavlodar
- (Ivory Coast) Béko Fofana, Irtysh Pavlodar
- (Kazakhstan) Elzhas Altynbekov, Kaisar
- (Kazakhstan) Duman Narzildaev, Kaisar
- (Kazakhstan) Bauyrzhan Islamkhan, Kairat
- (Russia) Andrey Arshavin, Kairat
- (Kazakhstan) Georgy Zhukov, Kairat
- (Kazakhstan) Aydar Zhaksybek, Kyran
- (Kazakhstan) Timur Muldinov, Kyzylzhar
- (Kazakhstan) Geysar Alekperzade, Makhtaaral
- (Kazakhstan) Tokhtar Bakhtiari, Makhtaaral
- (Kazakhstan) Ablayhan Makhambetov, Makhtaaral
- (Kazakhstan) Elmar Nabiev, Makhtaaral
- (Kazakhstan) Aleksandr Marochkin, Okzhetpes
- (Kazakhstan) Maxim Fedin, Okzhetpes
- (Kazakhstan) Sergey Shaff, Okzhetpes
- (Kazakhstan) Igor Yurin, Okzhetpes
- (Russia) Daniil Chertov, Okzhetpes
- (Georgia (country)) Gogita Gogua, Ordabasy
- (Kazakhstan) Bekzat Beisenov, Ordabasy
- (Kazakhstan) Vitali Li, Ordabasy
- (Kazakhstan) Amir Temirlan, Sports School №7
- (Ivory Coast) Didier Kadio, Shakhter Karagandy
- (Kazakhstan) Aidos Tattybaev, Shakhter Karagandy
- (Kazakhstan) Daurenbek Tazhimbetov, Shakhter Karagandy
- (Serbia) Marko Stanojević, Shakhter Karagandy
- (Slovakia) Július Szöke, Shakhter Karagandy
- (Kazakhstan) Toktar Zhangylyshbay, Tobol
- (Kazakhstan) Vyacheslav Serdyukov, Zhetysu
- (Kazakhstan) Aleksey Shakin, Zhetysu
- (Ukraine) Artem Kasyanov, Zhetysu

Own goal

- (Kazakhstan) Vladimir Pokatilov, Zhetysu (vs Ruzaevka)
