= Joseph Nane =

Cameroonian footballer

Personal information
- Full name: Joseph Nane Fils Eone
- Date of birth: March 12, 1987 (age 39)
- Place of birth: Yaoundé, Cameroon
- Height: 6 ft 2 in (1.88 m)
- Position: Midfielder

College career
Years	Team	Apps	(Gls)
2006–2009	Old Dominion Monarchs		

Senior career*
Years	Team	Apps	(Gls)
2007–2008	Hampton Roads Piranhas	31	(1)
2010	Toronto FC	11	(0)
2011–2012	Colorado Rapids	19	(1)
2013–2014	New York Cosmos	30	(0)
2015	San Antonio Scorpions	23	(1)
2016–2017	Okzhetpes	39	(0)
2017	Aktobe	19	(2)
2018	Atyrau	24	(1)
2019–2020	P.O. Xylotymbou		
2020–2021	ASIL Lysi		
2021–2023	Oakland Roots	50	(1)

Managerial career
- 2023: Project 51O (assistant)
- 2024–: Oakland Roots (assistant)
- * Club domestic league appearances and goals as of October 22, 2023

Joseph Nane Fils Eone (born March 12, 1987) is a Cameroonian football manager and former player who is the assistant manager of USL Championship club Oakland Roots.

== Career ==
=== College and amateur ===
Joseph attended the Catholic University of Cameroon prior to coming to the United States to play college soccer at Old Dominion University in 2006. He was a Second Team All-CAA selection in his junior year in 2008.

During his college years he also played with the Hampton Roads Piranhas in the USL Premier Development League.

=== Professional ===
Joseph was drafted in the fourth round (53rd overall) of the 2010 MLS SuperDraft by Toronto FC. Joseph signed a developmental contract with Toronto FC on April 5, 2010.

Joseph made his professional debut on April 10, 2010 in a game against New England Revolution.

Joseph was traded to Colorado Rapids on November 30, 2010 in exchange for a third-round selection in the 2012 MLS SuperDraft.

Nane was released by Colorado on November 16, 2012. He entered the 2012 MLS Re-Entry Draft and became a free agent after going undrafted in both rounds of the draft.

On March 12, 2013, Nane signed with New York Cosmos, and made 10 appearances and five starts in his first season with the team, which culminated in winning the 2013 NASL Soccer Bowl over Atlanta Silverbacks. The Cosmos announced on January 25, 2014 that they had signed Nane to a contract extension.

During the 2014 Spring season, Nane made eight appearances and six starts and recorded his first assist with the Cosmos in the team's 3-0 win over the Fort Lauderdale Strikers on May 31, 2014 at Fort Lauderdale, as the Cosmos finished in second place with a record of 6-1-2 (W-D-L).

Nane finished the 2014 regular season with 13 starts and 21 appearances. He recorded one assist on the season. He failed to reach a new contract agreement with New York at the end of 2014 and was released by the club.

Nane spent the 2015 season with San Antonio Scorpions, before the club ceased operations in December 2015.

==== Kazakhstan ====
In February 2016 Nane moved to the Kazakhstan Premier League, signing for FC Okzhetpes on a one-year contract. After suffering a recurrence of an old knee injury, Nane was ruled out for three months, subsequently Nane left Okzhetpes by mutual consent on 6 June 2017. The following June, having played an additional six-months with Okzhetpes, Nane signed for FC Aktobe on 18 June 2017. On 28 February 2018, Nane signed for FC Atyrau.

== Personal ==
Nane holds a U.S. green card which qualifies him as a domestic player for MLS roster purposes.

== Career statistics ==
=== Club ===
As of match played 11 November 2018

Appearances and goals by club, season and competition
Club	Season	League			National Cup		Continental		Other		Total	
Club	Season	Division	Apps	Goals	Apps	Goals	Apps	Goals	Apps	Goals	Apps	Goals
Toronto	2010	Major League Soccer	11	0	1	0	5	0	-		17	0
Colorado Rapids	2011	Major League Soccer	10	0	0	0	3	0	1	0	14	0
Colorado Rapids	2012	Major League Soccer	9	1	0	0	-		1	0	10	1
Colorado Rapids	Total		19	1	0	0	3	0	2	0	23	1
New York Cosmos	2013	North American Soccer League	9	0	0	0	-		1	0	10	0
New York Cosmos	2014	North American Soccer League	21	0	3	0	-		1	0	25	0
New York Cosmos	Total		30	0	3	0	-	-	2	0	35	0
San Antonio Scorpions	2015	North American Soccer League	23	1	0	0	-		-		23	1
Okzhetpes	2016	Kazakhstan Premier League	30	0	1	0	-		-		31	0
Okzhetpes	2017	Kazakhstan Premier League	9	0	1	0	-		-		10	0
Okzhetpes	Total		39	0	2	0	-	-	-	-	41	0
Aktobe	2017	Kazakhstan Premier League	19	2	0	0	-		-		19	2
Atyrau	2018	Kazakhstan Premier League	24	1	2	0	-		-		26	1
Career total			165	5	8	0	8	0	4	0	185	5

== Honours ==
Toronto FC

- Canadian Championship: 2010

New York Cosmos

- NASL Soccer Bowl: 2013
