= Eduard Sergienko =

Ukrainian-born Kazakhstani footballer

Personal information
- Full name: Eduard Vladimirovich Sergienko
- Date of birth: 18 February 1983 (age 43)
- Place of birth: Khartsyzk, Ukrainian SSR
- Height: 1.81 m (5 ft 11 in)
- Position: Midfielder

Youth career
- 1998: FC Kanatnyk Khartsyzsk
- 1999–2000: Shakhtar Donetsk

Senior career*
Years	Team	Apps	(Gls)
2000–2001	Shakhtar-3 Donetsk	16	(0)
2002	Caspiy	23	(3)
2003–2004	Ordabasy	39	(3)
2004–2007	Astana	68	(4)
2008	Shakhter Karagandy	12	(0)
2008	Atyrau	13	(0)
2009	Gomel	26	(0)
2010	Nizhny Novgorod	13	(0)
2011	Irtysh Pavlodar	23	(0)
2012–2015	Taraz	101	(1)
2016–2017	Akzhayik	38	(2)
2017–2019	Atyrau	64	(1)
2021	Zhenis	10	(1)

International career
2004–2005	Kazakhstan U21	4	(0)
2006–2007	Kazakhstan	19	(0)
- * Club domestic league appearances and goals as of 31 December 2021

Eduard Sergienko (Ukrainian: Едуард Володимирович Сергієнко; born 18 February 1983) is a Ukrainian-born Kazakhstani former football midfielder. He has been capped for the Kazakhstan national football team 19 times.

== Career ==
In January 2016, Sergienko signed for FC Akzhayik.

== Career statistics ==
=== Club ===
As of match played 10 November 2019

Appearances and goals by club, season and competition
Club	Season	League			National Cup		Continental		Total	
Club	Season	Division	Apps	Goals	Apps	Goals	Apps	Goals	Apps	Goals
Shakhtar-3 Donetsk	2000–01	Ukrainian Second League	14	0			-		14	0
Shakhtar-3 Donetsk	2001–02	Ukrainian Second League	2	0			-		2	0
Shakhtar-3 Donetsk	Total		16	0			-	-	16	0
Caspiy	2002	Kazakhstan First Division	23	3			–		23	3
Ordabasy	2003	Kazakhstan Premier League	22	0			-		22	0
Ordabasy	2004	Kazakhstan Premier League	17	3			-		17	3
Ordabasy	Total		39	3			-	-	39	3
Zhenis Astana	2004	Kazakhstan Premier League	11	1			-		11	1
Zhenis Astana	2005	Kazakhstan Premier League	13	1			-		13	1
Zhenis Astana	Total		24	2			-	-	24	2
Astana	2006	Kazakhstan Premier League	27	2			-		27	2
Astana	2007	Kazakhstan Premier League	17	0			4	0	21	0
Astana	Total		44	2			4	0	45	0
Shakhter Karagandy	2008	Kazakhstan Premier League	12	0			–		12	0
Atyrau	2009	Kazakhstan Premier League	13	0			–		13	0
Gomel	2009	Vysheyshaya Liga	26	0			–		26	0
Nizhny Novgorod	2010	Russian First Division	13	0			–		13	0
Irtysh Pavlodar	2011	Kazakhstan Premier League	31	3	2	0	4	0	37	3
Taraz	2012	Kazakhstan Premier League	23	0	2	0	–		25	0
Taraz	2013	Kazakhstan Premier League	28	0	4	0	–		32	0
Taraz	2014	Kazakhstan Premier League	27	0	2	0	–		29	0
Taraz	2015	Kazakhstan Premier League	23	1	1	0	–		24	1
Taraz	Total		101	1	9	0	-	-	110	1
Akzhayik	2016	Kazakhstan Premier League	29	1	0	0	–		29	1
Akzhayik	2017	Kazakhstan Premier League	9	1	0	0	–		9	1
Akzhayik	Total		38	2	0	0	-	-	38	2
Atyrau	2017	Kazakhstan Premier League	12	0	2	0	-		14	0
Atyrau	2018	Kazakhstan Premier League	25	0	5	0	-		30	0
Atyrau	2019	Kazakhstan Premier League	27	1	4	1	-		31	2
Atyrau	Total		64	1	11	1	-	-	75	2
Career total			444	17	22	1	8	0	470	18

=== International ===
As of match played 2 June 2007.

National team	Year	Apps	Goals
Kazakhstan	2006	13	0
Kazakhstan	2007	6	0
Total		19	0
