= Igor Zenkovich =

Belarusian professional football player

Personal information
- Full name: Igor Viktorovich Zenkovich
- Date of birth: 17 September 1987 (age 39)
- Place of birth: Minsk, Belarusian SSR, Soviet Union
- Height: 1.85 m (6 ft 1 in)
- Position: Forward

Youth career
- 2003–2006: BATE Borisov

Senior career*
Years	Team	Apps	(Gls)
2005–2007	BATE Borisov	0	(0)
2006	→ Neman Grodno (loan)	10	(1)
2007	→ Khimik Svetlogorsk (loan)	12	(5)
2007–2008	Darida Minsk Raion	37	(3)
2009–2011	Dinamo Minsk	2	(0)
2010–2011	→ Dnepr Mogilev (loan)	55	(19)
2012–2013	Akzhayik	39	(19)
2013	Shakhter Karagandy	17	(6)
2014	Aktobe	27	(6)
2015	Elazığspor	7	(2)
2015	Tobol	15	(4)
2016	Taraz	6	(3)
2017	Aktobe	30	(9)
2018	Atyrau	15	(2)
2018–2019	Kaisar	28	(3)
2020	Kyzylzhar	3	(0)
2021	Minsk	7	(1)
2021	Aktobe	4	(0)
Total		314	(83)
- * Club domestic league appearances and goals as of 31 December 2021

Igor Viktorovich Zenkovich (Belarusian: Ігар Віктаравіч Зяньковіч; Russian: Игорь Викторович Зенькович; born 17 September 1987) is a Belarusian professional football player.

== Career ==
=== Club ===
Zenkovich moved to Aktobe for the 2014 season, signing a one-year contract, with his contract not being renewed in December of the same year. In June 2015, Zenkovich returned to Kazakhstan, signing for FC Tobol, moving to FC Taraz in January 2016.

In January 2017, Zenkovich signed for FC Aktobe.

On 11 January 2018, FC Atyrau announced the signing of Zenkovich.

=== International ===
In May 2018, Zenkovich was called up to the Kazakhstan national team for the first time.

== Honours ==
Shakhter Karagandy

- Kazakhstan Cup winner: 2013

Kaisar

- Kazakhstan Cup winner: 2019
