= Zhasur Narzikulov =

Kazakhstani footballer

Personal information
- Date of birth: 13 April 1984 (age 42)
- Place of birth: Uzbek SSR, Soviet Union
- Height: 1.89 m (6 ft 2 in)
- Position: Goalkeeper

Senior career*
Years	Team	Apps	(Gls)
2005	Ordabasy	13	(0)
2006–2007	Aktobe	29	(0)
2008–2009	Andijon	24	(0)
2010	Mash'al Mubarek	15	(0)
2011	Qizilqum Zarafshon	5	(0)
2011	Kaisar	15	(0)
2012–2013	Aktobe	4	(0)
2014	Taraz	13	(0)
2015–2017	Atyrau	69	(0)
2018	Ordabasy	22	(0)
2019	Tobol	1	(0)
2020–2022	Aktobe	31	(0)
2023	Turan	7	(0)

International career
2006–2007	Kazakhstan	3	(0)
- * Club domestic league appearances and goals

Zhasur Narzikulov (Kazakh: Жасұр Нәрзіқұлов; born 13 April 1984) is a Kazakhstani former football goalkeeper.

He was previously known as Zhasulan Dekkhanov and was suspended from playing football in Kazakhstan for some time.

== Career ==
=== Club ===
Narzikulov started his career with Ordabasy.

On 26 June 2019, Narzikulov signed for FC Tobol until the end of the 2019 season. On 12 December 2019, Tobol announced that Narzikulov had left the club at the end of his contract. He left the club at the end of the year and then returned to FC Aktobe for the 2020 season.

In February 2023, it became known that Narzikulov was at the disposal of the Turan club.

== Involvement in Passport scandal ==
In March 2008, a campaign for passports clean-up was conducted by Football Federation of Kazakhstan. As a result, Narzikulov was found to be involved in Identity document forgery. He changed his original date of birth from 1984 to 1987, as well as his original name to Zhasulan Dekkhanov while getting Kazakhstani citizenship in 2005. As a result, he was suspended from playing football in Kazakhstan throughout season of 2008.

== Career statistics ==
=== Club ===
As of match played 30 October 2021

Appearances and goals by club, season and competition
Club	Season	League			National Cup		Continental		Other		Total	
Club	Season	Division	Apps	Goals	Apps	Goals	Apps	Goals	Apps	Goals	Apps	Goals
Ordabasy-2	2004	Kazakhstan First League		0	—							0
Ordabasy-2	2005	Kazakhstan First League	11	0	—						11	0
Ordabasy-2	Total			0	—							0
Ordabasy	2006	Kazakhstan Premier League	13	0			—				13	0
Aktobe	2007	Kazakhstan Premier League	25	0			—				25	0
Aktobe	2008	Kazakhstan Premier League	14	0			—				14	0
Aktobe	Total		39	0			—				39	0
Andijon	2008	Uzbek League	10	0			—				10	0
Andijon	2009	Uzbek League	14	0			—				14	0
Andijon	Total		24	0			—				24	0
Mash'al Mubarek	2010	Uzbek League	15	0			—				15	0
Qizilqum Zarafshon	2011	Uzbek League	5	0			—				5	0
Kaisar	2011	Kazakhstan Premier League	15	0			—				15	0
Aktobe	2012	Kazakhstan Premier League	0	0			—				0	0
Aktobe	2013	Kazakhstan Premier League	4	0			—				4	0
Aktobe	Total		4	0			—				4	0
Taraz	2014	Kazakhstan Premier League	13	0	1	0	—		1 (Note: Appearances in the Relegation play-offs)	0	15	0
Atyrau	2015	Kazakhstan Premier League	28	0	0	0	—				28	0
Atyrau	2016	Kazakhstan Premier League	32	0	3	0	—				35	0
Atyrau	2017	Kazakhstan Premier League	9	0	2	0	—				11	0
Atyrau	Total		69	0	5	0	—				74	0
Ordabasy	2018	Kazakhstan Premier League	22	0	2	0	—				24	0
Tobol	2019	Kazakhstan Premier League	1	0	0	0	0 (Note: Appearances in the Kazakhstan Super Cup)	0	—		1	0
Aktobe	2012	Kazakhstan First League	12	0	—						12	0
Aktobe	2021	Kazakhstan Premier League	19	0	2	0	—				21	0
Aktobe	Total		31	0	2	0	—				33	0
Career total			262	0	10	0	0	0	1	0	273	0

=== International ===
As of match played 7 March 2007

Appearances and goals by national team and year
National team	Year	Apps	Goals
Kazakhstan	2006	2	0
Kazakhstan	2007	1	0
Total		3	0

== Honours ==
=== Aktobe ===
- Kazakhstan Premier League(1): 2007
- Kazakhstan Super Cup (2): 2008, 2014
