= Rizvan Ablitarov =

Ukrainian footballer

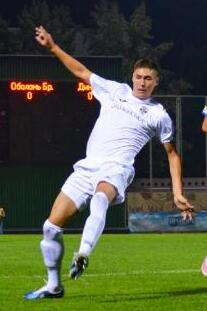
- Ablitarov playing for Obolon-Brovar Kyiv in 2015

Personal information
- Full name: Rizvan Reshatovych Ablitarov
- Date of birth: 18 April 1989 (age 37)
- Place of birth: Shahrisabz, Uzbek SSR Soviet Union
- Height: 1.93 m (6 ft 4 in)
- Position: Defender

Team information
- Current team: Kyzyltash Bakhchisaray
- Number: 33

Youth career
- Youth Sportive School Sudak
- 2003–2006: UOR Simferopol

Senior career*
Years	Team	Apps	(Gls)
2006–2009	Dnipro Dnipropetrovsk	0	(0)
2009–2011	Illichivets Mariupol	0	(0)
2012–2014	Sevastopol	0	(0)
2012	→ Sevastopol-2 (loan)	4	(0)
2012–2013	→ Bukovyna Chernivtsi (loan)	26	(2)
2013–2014	→ Tytan Armyansk (loan)	23	(0)
2014–2015	Daugava Daugavpils	9	(0)
2015–2016	Obolon-Brovar Kyiv	47	(1)
2017	Chornomorets Odesa	12	(0)
2017–2019	Atyrau	73	(5)
2020	Kaisar	0	(0)
2020	Olimpik Donetsk	2	(0)
2021–2022	Zhetysu	15	(0)
2022	Bukhara	11	(0)
2024	Inkomsport Yalta		
2024–2025	Kyzyltash Bakhchisaray		
2026–	Kyzyltash Bakhchisaray	2	(0)

International career^{‡}
2006	Crimean Tatars	5	(0)
2007	Ukraine U18	1	(0)
2007–2008	Ukraine U19	8	(0)
- * Club domestic league appearances and goals as of 31 October 2026 ‡ National team caps and goals as of 14 February 2018

Rizvan Reshatovych Ablitarov (Ukrainian: Різван Решатович Аблітаров; born 18 April 1989) is a Ukrainian professional footballer who plays as a defender for Russian Second League club Kyzyltash Bakhchisaray.

== Early life ==
Ablitarov was born on 18 April 1989 in the city of Shahrisabz, which was then part of the Uzbek SSR in the Soviet Union. After relocating to Ukraine following the collapse of the Soviet Union, he first began playing football under coach Reshat Ablitarov at the Sudak Youth Sports School.

== Career ==
=== Club ===
Ablitarov is product of the UOR Simferopol youth system. In 2006, he began playing for the reserve team of Dnipro Dnipropetrovsk until 2009. In September 2009, he signed a contract with Illichivets Mariupol reserve team, which he stayed at until 2011. In 2012, he returned to Crimea to play for Sevastopol. After going on loan, he played for various clubs in Latvia and Ukraine, and in 2017 was brought on as a defender for Chornomorets Odesa.

Soon after in late 2017, he signed on as a player for Atyrau in Kazakhstan. At Atyrau, he helped them reach the final of the Kazakhstan Cup in 2017 for the first time in several years. At the end of 2019, he left Atyrau as a free agent, and in January 2020 it was announced that FC Kaisar was reviewing him as a potential new signing. On 15 January 2020, Ablitarov signed for FC Kaisar. In 2021, he signed for Zhetysu. In 2024, he returned to the now Russian-occupied Crimea to join PFC Inkomsport and later FC Kyzyltash, both local clubs based in Yalta.

== Honours ==
Sevastopol

- Ukrainian First League: 2012–13

Atyrau

- Kazakhstan Cup runner-up: 2017, 2018, 2019
