= Jovan Đokić =

Serbian footballer (born 1992)

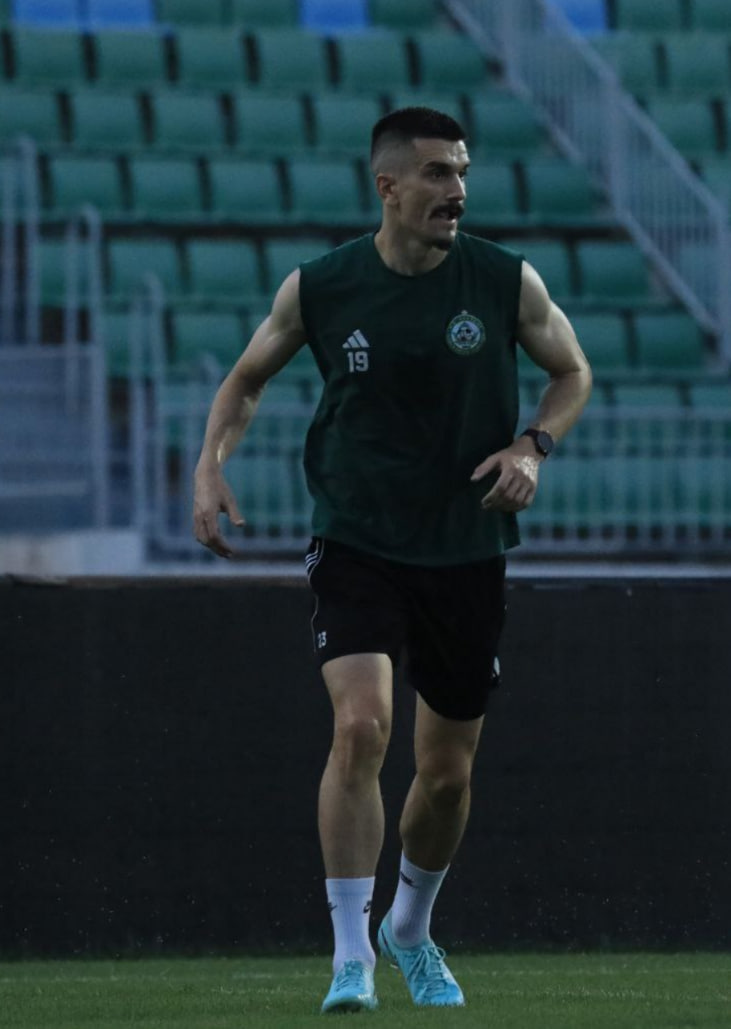

Personal information
- Full name: Jovan Đokić
- Date of birth: 13 August 1992 (age 34)
- Place of birth: Brus, FR Yugoslavia
- Height: 1.86 m (6 ft 1 in)
- Position: Defensive midfielder

Team information
- Current team: Neftchi Fergana
- Number: 23

Senior career*
Years	Team	Apps	(Gls)
2011–2016	Javor Ivanjica	117	(6)
2012	→ Rudar Kostolac (loan)	10	(1)
2017	Atyrau	30	(0)
2018	AGMK	31	(11)
2019	Lokomotiv Tashkent	24	(1)
2020–2021	AGMK	48	(6)
2022–2024	Navbahor	72	(9)
2025–	Neftchi Fergana	37	(6)

International career^{‡}
2017	Serbia	1	(0)
- * Club domestic league appearances and goals as of 20:22, 28 July 2026 (UTC) ‡ National team caps and goals as of 29 January 2017

Jovan Đokić (Serbian Cyrillic: Јован Ђокић; born 13 August 1992) is a Serbian footballer who plays as a midfielder for Neftchi Fergana.

== Club career ==
On 21 January 2017, Đokić signed for Kazakhstan Premier League side FC Atyrau.

=== Neftchi Fergana ===
On 9 December 2024, he signed a two-year contract with Neftchi.

== International career ==
Đokić was called up to the Serbia national football team by coach Slavoljub Muslin in January 2017. On 29 January 2017, Đokić made his international debut for Serbia in a friendly match against the United States in a 0–0 away draw in San Diego.
