= Shavkat Salomov =

Uzbekistani footballer (born 1985)

Personal information
- Date of birth: 13 November 1985 (age 40)
- Place of birth: Bukhoro, Uzbek SSR, Soviet Union
- Height: 1.74 m (5 ft 9 in)
- Position: Midfielder

Team information
- Current team: FK Surkhan
- Number: 10

Youth career
- Quruvchi Tashkent

Senior career*
| Years | Team | Apps | (Gls) |
| 2000–2006 | Buxoro | 141 | (18) |
| 2007–2012 | Bunyodkor | 160 | (30) |
| 2010 | → Nasaf Qarshi (loan) | 5 | (2) |
| 2013 | Zhetysu | 27 | (3) |
| 2014 | Shakhter Karagandy | 28 | (3) |
| 2015 | Olmaliq | 29 | (8) |
| 2016 | Buxoro | 29 | (3) |
| 2017 | Atyrau | 25 | (2) |
| 2018 | Buxoro | 27 | (3) |
| 2019–2021 | Surkhon Termez | 47 | (4) |
| 2021–2022 | Buxoro | 0 | (0) |
| 2022 | FC Sogdiana Jizzakh | 11 | (0) |

International career
| 2007–2012 | Uzbekistan | 12 | (1) |
- * Club domestic league appearances and goals as of 2 December 2019 (UTC)

Shavkat Salomov (born 13 November 1985) is an Uzbekistani footballer who plays as a midfielder.

== Club career ==
In February 2013 Salomov moved to Zhetysu, after playing 6 seasons for Bunyodkor. On 9 March 2013 Salomov in his debut match in Kazakhstan Premier League against Kairat, ended with draw 3:3, scored his first goal for club. In February 2014, he signed a contract with Shakhter Karagandy, another Kazakh club.

On 8 January 2018, Salomov signed for FK Buxoro.

== International career ==
Salomov made two appearances for the national team in the 2010 FIFA World Cup qualifying rounds.

== Career statistics ==
=== Club ===
As of match played 5 November 2017

Appearances and goals by club, season and competition
| Club | Season | League | | | National cup | | Continental | | Other | | Total | |
| Club | Season | Division | Apps | Goals | Apps | Goals | Apps | Goals | Apps | Goals | Apps | Goals |
|---|---|---|---|---|---|---|---|---|---|---|---|---|
| Bunyodkor | 2010 | Uzbek League | 1 | 0 | | | 3 | 0 | 0 | 0 | 4 | 0 |
| Bunyodkor | 2011 | Uzbek League | 23 | 2 | 4 | 0 | 5 | 0 | 0 | 0 | 32 | 2 |
| Bunyodkor | 2012 | Uzbek League | 23 | 6 | 7 | 4 | 11 | 1 | 0 | 0 | 41 | 11 |
| Bunyodkor | Total | | 47 | 8 | 11 | 4 | 19 | 1 | 0 | 0 | 77 | 13 |
| Nasaf (loan) | 2010 | Uzbek League | 5 | 2 | | | – | | 0 | 0 | 5 | 2 |
| Zhetysu | 2013 | Kazakhstan Premier League | 27 | 3 | 0 | 0 | 0 | 0 | 0 | 0 | 27 | 3 |
| Shakhter Karagandy | 2014 | Kazakhstan Premier League | 28 | 3 | 2 | 0 | 2 | 0 | 1 | 0 | 33 | 3 |
| Olmaliq | 2015 | Uzbek League | 29 | 8 | 0 | 0 | – | | – | | 29 | 8 |
| Buxoro | 2016 | Uzbek League | 29 | 3 | 6 | 1 | – | | – | | 35 | 4 |
| Atyrau | 2017 | Kazakhstan Premier League | 25 | 2 | 4 | 0 | – | | – | | 29 | 2 |
| Buxoro | 2018 | Uzbekistan Super League | 0 | 0 | 0 | 0 | – | | – | | 0 | 0 |
| Career total | | | 190 | 29 | 23 | 5 | 21 | 1 | 1 | 0 | 235 | 35 |

=== International ===
Appearances and goals by national team and year
| National team | Year | Apps | Goals |
|---|---|---|---|
| Uzbekistan | 2007 | 2 | 1 |
| Uzbekistan | 2008 | 0 | 0 |
| Uzbekistan | 2009 | 0 | 0 |
| Uzbekistan | 2010 | 3 | 0 |
| Uzbekistan | 2011 | 3 | 0 |
| Uzbekistan | 2012 | 2 | 0 |
| Uzbekistan | 2013 | 1 | 0 |
| Uzbekistan | 2015 | 1 | 0 |
| Total | | 12 | 1 |

Statistics accurate as of match played 31 March 2015

| # | Date | Venue | Opponent | Score | Result | Competition |
|---|---|---|---|---|---|---|
| 1 | 13 October 2007 | Tashkent, Uzbekistan | Chinese Taipei | 9–0 | 9–0 | 2010 FIFA World Cup Qualification |

== Honours ==
Bunyodkor

- Uzbek League (3): 2008, 2009, 2011
- Uzbek Cup (1): 2012

Uzbekistan

- AFC Asian Cup 4th: 2011
