= Anton Chichulin =

Kazakh football midfielder

Personal information
- Date of birth: 27 November 1984 (age 41)
- Place of birth: Astana, Kazakhstan
- Height: 1.82 m (6 ft 0 in)
- Position: Midfielder

Senior career*
Years	Team	Apps	(Gls)
2001–2008	Astana-64	124	(8)
2009–2011	Aktobe	60	(0)
2012–2014	Irtysh	57	(3)
2014	Giresunspor	7	(1)
2015	Atyrau	28	(0)
2016	Okzhetpes	21	(1)
2017–2018	Atyrau	26	(0)
2018–2019	Shakhter Karagandy	25	(1)

International career
2004–2011	Kazakhstan	24	(1)
- * Club domestic league appearances and goals

Anton Chichulin (born 27 November 1984) is a Kazakh former football midfielder.

== Career ==
=== Club ===
In January 2015, Chichulin returned to Kazakhstan, signing with FC Atyrau. A year later, in February 2016, Chichulin signed for FC Okzhetpes. On 30 September 2016, Chichulin had his contract with FC Okzhetpes terminated by mutual consent.

=== International ===
Chichulin has made 24 appearances for the Kazakhstan national football team.
