= Munaishy Stadium =

Sports venue in Atyrau, Kazakhstan

Coordinates: 47°05′39″N 51°54′30″E

Munayshy Stadium
- Interactive map of Munayshy Stadium
- Location: Atyrau, Kazakhstan
- Owner: Municipality of Atyrau
- Capacity: 8,900
- Surface: Grass; 105m x 70m
- Record attendance: 8,600 Atyrau-Matador Púchov, 15 August 2002

Construction
- Opened: 1954

Tenant
- FC Atyrau

Munayshy Stadium is a multi-use stadium in Atyrau, Kazakhstan. It is currently used mostly for football matches and is the home stadium of FC Atyrau.

== History ==
The stadium was opened on 1 May 1950. Its capacity is 8900 spectators. The pitch measures 105 by 70 metres. In 1999, "Munashy" stadium was completely overhauled and as a new modern sport complex rebuilt. In 2008, a modern swimming pool was put into operation in the "Munaishy" complex.

== Features ==
- Three stands - West, North and East
- Capacity - 8 900 spectators
- Field size - 105 x 70 metres
- Artificial turf (2019)
- Seats - Plastic
- VIP seats
- Electronic scoreboard
