= Predrag Sikimić =

Serbian footballer

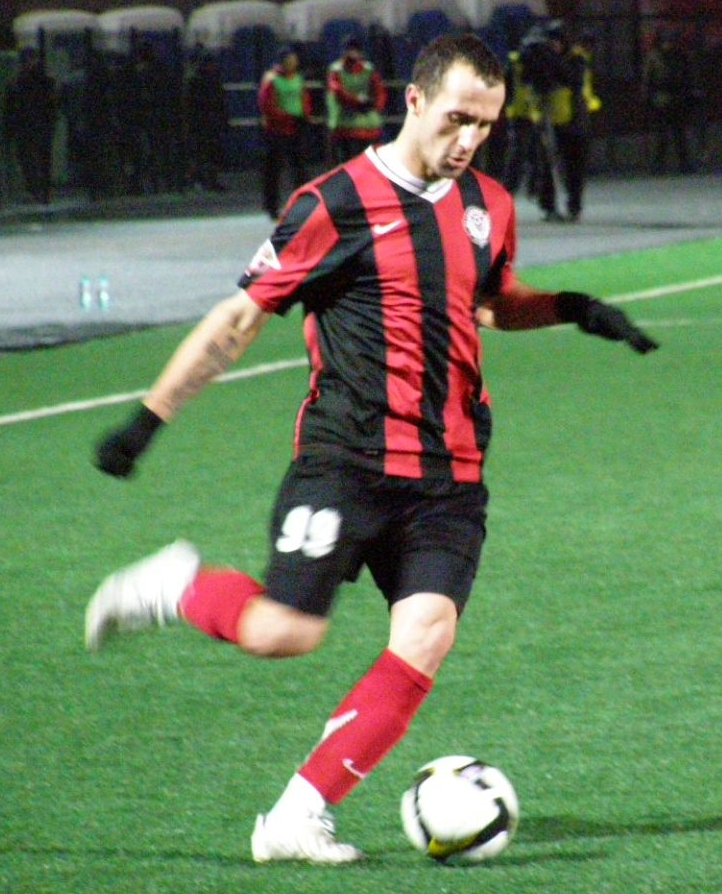
- Sikimić with Amkar Perm

Personal information
- Date of birth: 29 August 1982 (age 44)
- Place of birth: Smederevo, SFR Yugoslavia
- Height: 1.89 m (6 ft 2 in)
- Position: Forward

Youth career
- 1999–2000: Sartid Smederevo
- 2000–2001: Lierse

Senior career*
Years	Team	Apps	(Gls)
2001–2002	Lierse	18	(3)
2002	Timok	8	(3)
2003–2006	Rad	107	(39)
2006–2007	Vojvodina	20	(4)
2007–2009	Amkar Perm	52	(6)
2010–2011	Ural Yekaterinburg	68	(10)
2012	Radnički Kragujevac	11	(0)
2013	Smederevo	14	(5)
2013	Aiginiakos	10	(4)
2014	Kerkyra	16	(1)
2014	Singhtarua	15	(4)
2015	Voždovac	17	(4)
2015–2017	Red Star Belgrade	46	(10)
2017–2018	Atyrau	44	(10)
2019	Voždovac	11	(3)
2019	Tabor Sežana	20	(12)
2020	Domžale	25	(2)
2021	Železničar Pančevo	25	(9)
Total		527	(129)
- * Club domestic league appearances and goals

Predrag Sikimić (Serbian Cyrillic: Предраг Сикимић; born 29 August 1982) is a Serbian former professional footballer who played as a forward.

He is the younger brother of Milovan Sikimić.

== Career ==
On 11 January 2019, Sikimic signed with FK Voždovac.

== Honours ==
Red Star Belgrade

- Serbian SuperLiga: 2015–16
