= Marat Khayrullin =

Russian-born Kazakhstani footballer

Personal information
- Full name: Marat Nailyevich Khayrullin
- Date of birth: April 26, 1984 (age 42)
- Place of birth: Kazan, Russian SFSR
- Height: 1.77 m (5 ft 10 in)
- Position: Midfielder

Senior career*
Years	Team	Apps	(Gls)
2002	Rubin Kazan	0	(0)
2003	Rubin Kazan (reserves)		
2004–2005	Rubin Kazan 2	62	(14)
2006	Rubin Kazan (reserves)		
2007–2009	Aktobe	83	(22)
2010	Volga Nizhny Novgorod	7	(0)
2010–2015	Aktobe	142	(39)
2016	Okzhetpes	27	(7)
2017–2018	Atyrau	56	(10)
2019	Kaisar	16	(0)
2019	Baikonur	1	(0)

International career
2011–	Kazakhstan	13	(0)
- * Club domestic league appearances and goals

Marat Nailyevich Khayrullin (Russian: Марат Наильевич Хайруллин; Tatar: Марат Наил улы Хәйруллин; born 26 April 1984) is a Russian-born Kazakh former football attacking midfielder/forward.

== Career ==
=== Club ===
Khayrullin previously played for FC Rubin Kazan's B team.

On 30 September 2016, Khayrullin had his contract with FC Okzhetpes terminated by mutual consent.

== Career statistics ==
=== International ===
Kazakhstan
Year	Apps	Goals
2011	5	0
2012	3	0
2013	4	0
2014	1	0
Total	13	0

Statistics accurate as of match played 7 June 2014

== Honours ==
Aktobe

- Kazakhstan Premier League (4): 2007, 2008, 2009, 2013
- Kazakhstan Cup (1): 2008
- Kazakhstan Super Cup (2): 2008, 2014
