= Novica Maksimović =

Serbian footballer

Personal information
- Full name: Novica Maksimović
- Date of birth: 4 April 1988 (age 38)
- Place of birth: Crvenka, SR Serbia, SFR Yugoslavia
- Height: 1.86 m (6 ft 1 in)
- Position: Defensive midfielder

Senior career*
Years	Team	Apps	(Gls)
2005–2006	Crvenka	16	(1)
2008–2012	Hajduk Kula	88	(0)
2012–2013	Novi Sad	14	(3)
2013	Pápa	11	(0)
2014	Sloboda Užice	13	(0)
2014–2015	Spartak Subotica	26	(2)
2015–2016	Vojvodina	45	(0)
2017–2018	Atyrau	50	(7)
2019–2020	Panionios	23	(4)
2020–2022	Vojvodina	43	(1)
2022–2023	Mladost Novi Sad	31	(6)
2023–2024	Zvijezda 09	24	(6)
- * Club domestic league appearances and goals as of 13 March 2024

Novica Maksimović (Serbian Cyrillic: Новица Максимовић; born 4 April 1988) is a Serbian professional footballer who plays as a defensive midfielder.
