= Vladimir Dvalishvili =

Georgian footballer (born 1986)

Vladimer Dvalishvili ვლადიმერ დვალიშვილი
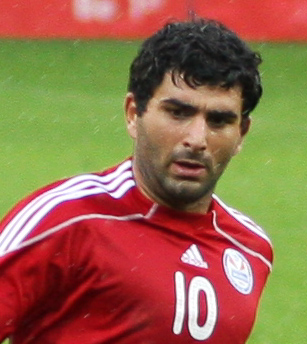

Personal information
- Full name: Vladimer Dvalishvili
- Date of birth: 20 April 1986 (age 40)
- Place of birth: Tbilisi, Georgia
- Height: 1.82 m (6 ft 0 in)
- Position: Forward

Senior career*
Years	Team	Apps	(Gls)
2004–2006	Dinamo Tbilisi	15	(5)
2006	→ Dinamo Batumi (loan)	15	(9)
2006–2007	Olimpi Rustavi	34	(9)
2008–2009	Skonto Riga	42	(22)
2009–2012	Maccabi Haifa	76	(35)
2012–2013	Polonia Warsaw	27	(10)
2013–2014	Legia Warsaw	35	(15)
2014–2015	OB	13	(2)
2015–2016	Pogoń Szczecin	28	(3)
2016–2017	Dinamo Tbilisi	7	(2)
2017–2018	Atyrau	31	(3)
2018	Hapoel Ashkelon	9	(7)
2018–2019	Saburtalo Tbilisi	24	(4)
2019–2020	Dinamo Batumi	23	(4)

International career
2002	Georgia U17	3	(0)
2003	Georgia U19	3	(0)
2004–2005	Georgia U21	5	(0)
2009–2020	Georgia	44	(6)
- * Club domestic league appearances and goals

Vladimir "Lado" Dvalishvili (Georgian: ვლადიმერ დვალიშვილი; born 20 April 1986) is a retired Georgian former professional footballer who played as a forward. He was most recently the sporting director of Dinamo Batumi.

== Career ==
Dvalishvili was signed by Olimpi Rustavi in June 2006.

On 7 July 2009, Dvalishvili signed a two-year contract with the Israeli champions Maccabi Haifa.

Dvalishvili made his debut on 2009–10 UEFA Champions League Second qualifying round, 15 July 2009, against Glentoran and scored two goals. In the next round, against Aktobe, Dvalishvili scored the last two goals in Maccabi Haifa's great comeback – scoring four straight goals after falling down 3–0 in the first 15 minutes of the match.

In January 2012, Dvalishvili joined Polish club Polonia Warsaw in the Ekstraklasa on a two-and-a-half-year contract.

Dvalishvili joined Legia Warsaw on 15 February 2013 on a two-and-a-half-year contract. The club finished the 2012–13 season with the double (cup and championship).

On 12 August 2014, "Lado" left Legia under mutual agreement and, a day later, he signed a two-year contract with Odense BK. On 27 August 2015 29-year-old Dvalishvili signed 3-year contract with Pogon.

In July 2016, Dvalishvili returned to Georgia, after agreeing to a half-year contract with FC Dinamo Tbilisi.

Dvalishvili ended his playing career at Dinamo Batumi in 2020. He stayed on at the club as Sports manager until May 2024 when he was appointed on one of the managerial positions in the Georgia national team.

== International career ==
He made his Georgia debut on 6 June 2009. On 9 September 2009, Dvalishvili scored a goal in a friendly match his country lost 2–1 to Iceland. On 10 October 2009, he scored a goal against Montenegro, in the 2010 FIFA World Cup qualifiers. On 14 October 2009, he scored a goal against Bulgaria, in a 2010 FIFA World Cup qualifiers 6–2 defeat.

== Career statistics ==
Updated 1 August 2014

Club	Season	Umaglesi Liga		–		Europe		Total
Club	Season	App	Goals	App	Goals	App	Goals	App	Goals
FC Dinamo Tbilisi	2004–05	10	4	–		–		10	4
FC Dinamo Tbilisi	2005–06	5	1	–		–		5	1
FC Dinamo Tbilisi	Total	15	5	0	0	0	0	15	5
FC Dinamo Batumi	2005–06	15	9	–		–		15	9
FC Olimpi Rustavi	2006–07	22	8	–		–		22	8
FC Olimpi Rustavi	2007–08	12	1	–		2	0	14	1
FC Olimpi Rustavi	Total	34	9	0	0	2	0	36	9
Club	Season	Virslīga		–		Europe		Total
Skonto FC	2008	27	9	–		–		27	9
Skonto FC	2009	15	13	–		–		15	13
Skonto FC	Total	42	22	0	0	0	0	42	22
Club	Season	Ligat HaAl		Israel State Cup/ Toto Cup		Europe		Total
Maccabi Haifa	2009–10	35	16	8	3	12	5	55	24
Maccabi Haifa	2010–11	30	12	5	2	2	2	37	16
Maccabi Haifa	2011–12	11	7	0	0	10	4	21	11
Maccabi Haifa	Total	76	35	13	5	24	11	113	51
Club	Season	Ekstraklasa		Polish Cup		Europe		Total
Polonia Warsaw	2011–12	12	3	–		–		12	3
Polonia Warsaw	2012–13	15	7	–		–		15	7
Polonia Warsaw	Total	27	10	0	0	0	0	27	10
Legia Warsaw	2012–13	13	5	6	4	–		19	9
Legia Warsaw	2013–14	21	10	2	0	10	2	33	12
Legia Warsaw	2014–15	1	0	0	0	0	0	1	0
Legia Warsaw	Total	35	15	8	4	10	2	53	21
Career Total		244	105	21	9	36	13	300	127

=== International goals ===
Scores and results list Georgia's goal tally first.

#	Date	Venue	Opponent	Score	Result	Competition
1.	10 June 2009	Qemal Stafa Stadium, Tirana, Albania	Albania	1–0	1–1	Friendly
2.	9 September 2009	Laugardalsvöllur, Reykjavík, Iceland	Iceland	1–2	1–3	Friendly
3.	10 October 2009	Podgorica City Stadium, Podgorica, Montenegro	Montenegro	1–1	1–2	2010 FIFA World Cup qualification
4.	14 October 2009	Vasil Levski National Stadium, Sofia, Bulgaria	Bulgaria	1–4	2–6	2010 FIFA World Cup qualification
5.	29 May 2014	Estadio Municipal de Chapin, Jerez de la Frontera, Spain	Saudi Arabia	2–0	2–0	Friendly
6.	7 June 2017	Mikheil Meskhi Stadium, Tbilisi, Georgia	Saint Kitts and Nevis	3–0	3–0	Friendly
Correct as of 7 June 2017

== Honours ==
Dinamo Tbilisi

- Erovnuli Liga: 2004–05
- Georgian Super Cup: 2005

Olimpi Rustavi

- Erovnuli Liga: 2006–07

Maccabi Haifa

- Israeli Premier League: 2010–11

Legia Warsaw

- Ekstraklasa: 2012–13, 2013–14
- Polish Cup: 2012–13

Saburtalo Tbilisi

- Erovnuli Liga: 2018
- Georgian Cup: 2019
