= Jure Obšivač =

Croatian footballer (born 1990)

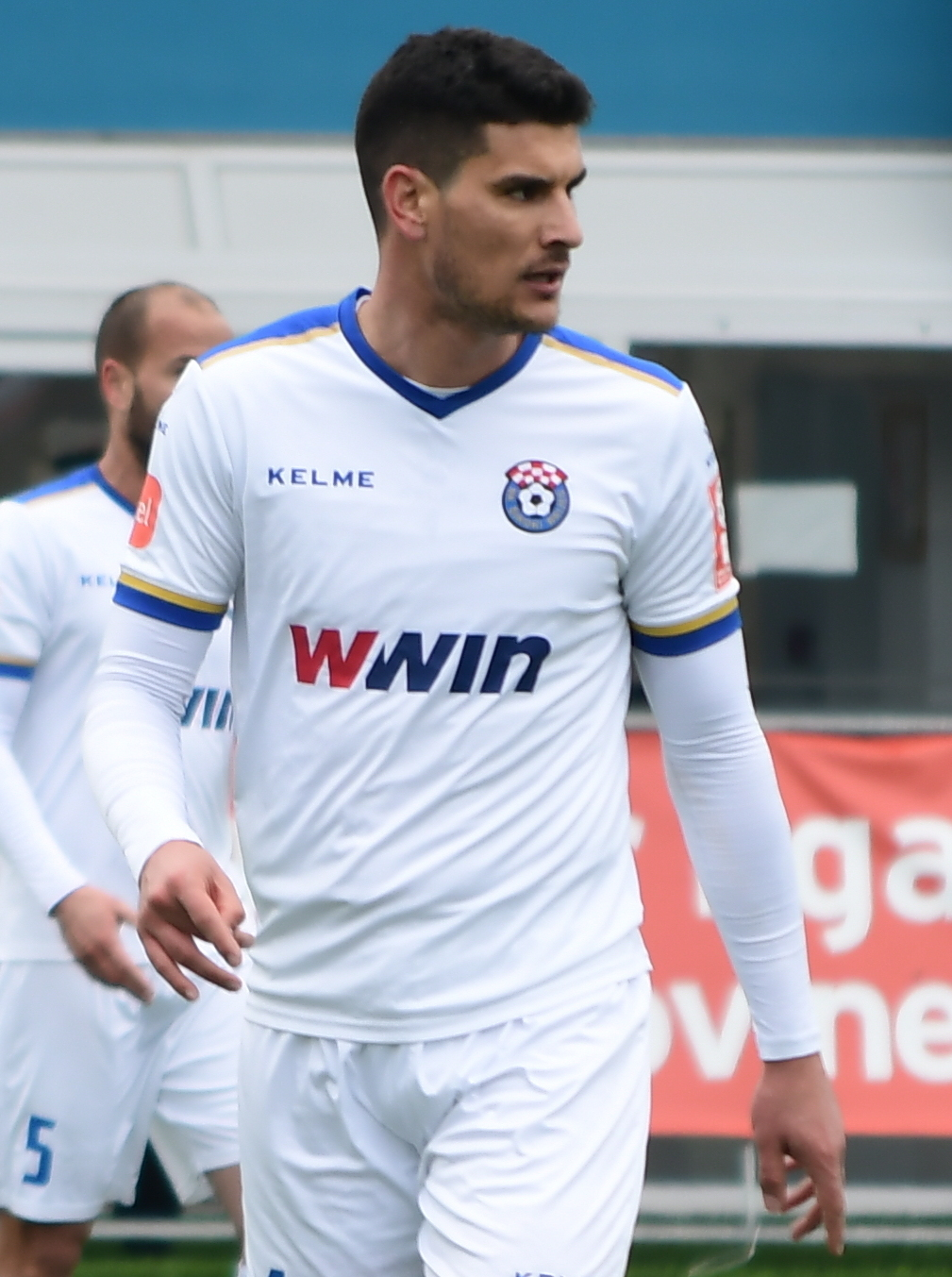
- Obšivač playing for Široki Brijeg in 2021

Personal information
- Date of birth: 28 May 1990 (age 36)
- Place of birth: Metković, SFR Yugoslavia
- Height: 1.86 m (6 ft 1 in)
- Positions: Defender; midfielder

Youth career
- 1996–2005: Neretva
- 2005–2009: Hajduk Split

Senior career*
Years	Team	Apps	(Gls)
2008–2012	Hajduk Split	7	(0)
2008–2009	→ GOŠK Kaštel Gomilica (loan)	9	(0)
2010–2012	→ Dugopolje (loan)	56	(1)
2013–2015	Istra 1961	81	(3)
2015–2017	RNK Split	31	(0)
2017	Atyrau	28	(5)
2018	Sepsi OSK	11	(0)
2018–2019	Atyrau	12	(2)
2019	Domžale	1	(0)
2020–2021	Široki Brijeg	37	(1)
2022	Sogdiana Jizzakh	20	(0)
2023	Croatia Zmijavci	16	(2)
2023–2024	GOŠK Gabela	12	(1)
Total		321	(15)

Managerial career
- 2025–2026: GOŠK Gabela
- * Club domestic league appearances and goals

Jure Obšivač (born 28 May 1990) is a Croatian professional football manager and former player who was most recently the manager of First League of FBiH club GOŠK Gabela.

== Managerial statistics ==
As of match played 12 April 2026

Managerial record by team and tenure
Team	From	To	Record							
Team	From	To	G	W	D	L	GF	GA	GD	Win %
GOŠK Gabela	27 August 2025	13 April 2026	21	9	5	7	28	19	+9	42.86
Total			21	9	5	7	28	19	+9	42.86
