= Ucha Lobjanidze =

Georgian footballer

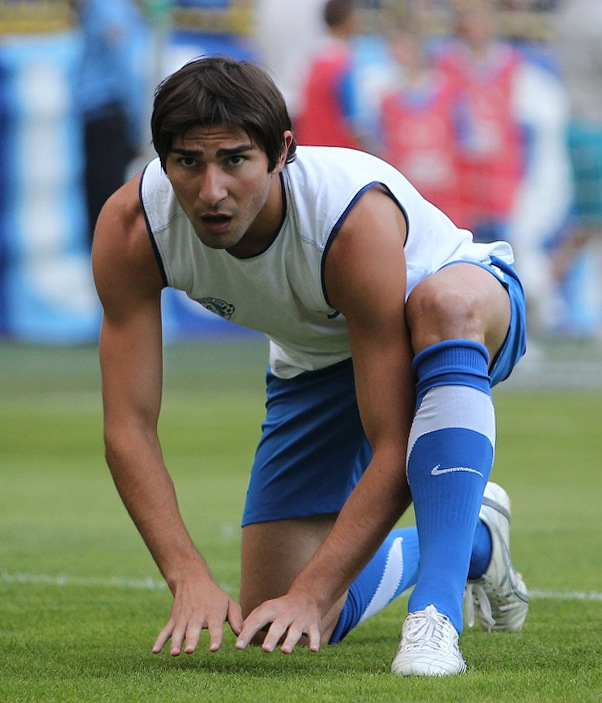

Personal information
- Date of birth: 23 February 1987 (age 39)
- Place of birth: Tbilisi, Georgian SSR
- Height: 1.84 m (6 ft 0 in)
- Positions: Right back; centre back

Senior career*
Years	Team	Apps	(Gls)
2003–2006	Dinamo-2 Tbilisi	38	(0)
2005–2006	Dinamo Tbilisi	4	(0)
2007	Dinamo Batumi	19	(0)
2007–2010	Zestaponi	62	(0)
2010–2014	Dnipro Dnipropetrovsk	27	(0)
2011–2013	→ Kryvbas Kryvyi Rih (loan)	47	(0)
2014–2016	Omonia	35	(1)
2016–2017	Dinamo Tbilisi	23	(0)
2017	Atyrau	23	(0)
2018	Samtredia	3	(0)
2018	Locomotive Tbilisi	18	(1)

International career^{‡}
2007–2009	Georgia U21	6	(0)
2008–2017	Georgia	53	(1)
- * Club domestic league appearances and goals as of 27 September 2018 ‡ National team caps and goals as of 9 September 2017

Ucha Lobjanidze (Georgian: უჩა ლობჟანიძე, romanized: ucha lobzhanidze, pronounced [utʃʰa lobʒanidze]; born 23 February 1987) is a retired Georgian footballer who played as a defender for several clubs in Georgia and abroad as well as for the national team.

== Career ==
=== Club ===
Lobjanidze started his career at Dinamo Tbilisi junior team. In the late 2000s, he spent three seasons at the ascending Zestaponi before his move to Dnipro at estimated €2 mln.

He returned in 2016 to play for Dinamo Tbilisi and won both Umaglesi Liga and the national Cup with this club.

Following his one-year tenure in Kazakhstan, in early 2018 Lobjanidze returned to Georgia, but in the autumn he suffered a long-term injury, which hastened his retirement in March 2019 at the age of 32.

=== International ===
Lobjanidze made his Georgia debut on 27 May 2008, a friendly match against Estonia. With 53 appearances during the next ten years, he was a regular member of the starting lineup.

== Honours ==
Ukraine Premier League

• Runner-up 2013–2014

Erovnuli Liga

• Winner 2015–2016

• Runner-up 2006–2007

David Kipiani Cup

• Winner 2015–2016

Kazakhstan Cup

• Runner-up 2017
