= 2021 FC Zhetysu season =

FC Zhetysu
2021 season
- Chairman: Zheksenbai Kusainov
- Manager: Rinat Alyuetov
- Stadium: Zhetysu Stadium
- Premier League: 14th
- Kazakhstan Cup: Group stage
- Top goalscorer: League: Two Players (4); All: Artjom Dmitrijev (5)
Home colours	Away colours

The 2021 FC Zhetysu season was the club's fourth season back in the Kazakhstan Premier League following their relegation at the end of the 2016 season, and 24th season in total.

== Season events ==
On 10 March, Zhetysu had three points deducted as a punishment for the unavailability of their nominated reserve stadium for their second match-day fixture.

== Squad ==
As of match played 30 October 2020

No.	Name	Nationality	Position	Date of birth (age)	Signed from	Signed in	Contract ends	Apps.	Goals
Goalkeepers
1	Andrey Shabanov	(Kazakhstan)	GK	17 November 1986 (aged 34)	Atyrau	2015			
21	Mikhail Golubnichy	(Kazakhstan)	GK	31 January 1995 (aged 26)	Aksu	2021		11	0
70	Denis Kavlinov	(Russia)	GK	10 January 1995 (aged 26)	Caspiy	2021		12	0
Defenders
2	Temirlan Adilkhanov	(Kazakhstan)	DF	28 March 1994 (aged 27)	Youth Team	2021			
3	Sanjar Batyrkhanov	(Kazakhstan)	DF	10 November 1999 (aged 21)	Youth Team	2021		12	0
4	Maxim Chalkin	(Kazakhstan)	DF	9 March 1996 (aged 25)	Youth Team	2021		1	0
14	Rafkat Aslan	(Kazakhstan)	DF	2 February 1994 (aged 27)	Caspiy	2021		6	0
15	Rauan Orynbasar	(Kazakhstan)	DF	1 March 1998 (aged 23)	Youth Team	2018		19	0
26	Damir Dautov	(Kazakhstan)	DF	3 March 1990 (aged 31)	Ordabasy	2021		13	0
48	Dilshat Musaev	(Kazakhstan)	DF	9 January 1995 (aged 26)	Altai Semey	2019			
55	Rizvan Ablitarov	(Ukraine)	DF	18 April 1989 (aged 32)	Olimpik Donetsk	2021		20	0
59	Illya Kalpachuk	(Belarus)	DF	9 October 1990 (aged 31)	Rukh Brest	2021		16	0
77	Temur Partsvania	(Ukraine)	DF	6 July 1991 (aged 30)	Mykolaiv	2021		13	0
Midfielders
5	Vladyslav Okhronchuk	(Ukraine)	MF	14 July 1997 (aged 24)	Mykolaiv	2021		10	0
6	Adam Adakhadzhiev	(Kazakhstan)	MF	23 November 1998 (aged 22)	loan from Kairat	2021		27	2
7	Aslan Adil	(Kazakhstan)	MF	13 January 1998 (aged 23)	Youth Team	2021		29	4
8	Artjom Dmitrijev	(Estonia)	MF	21 January 1989 (aged 32)	Okzhetpes	2021		30	5
10	Raul Jalilov	(Kyrgyzstan)	MF	20 July 1994 (aged 27)	Oñtüstik Akademia	2021			
17	Nurbol Nurbergen	(Kazakhstan)	MF	26 December 2000 (aged 20)	Youth Team	2021		22	1
20	Tengiz Tsikaridze	(Georgia (country))	MF	21 December 1995 (aged 25)	Tom Tomsk	2021		4	0
22	Aslan Dzhanuzakov	(Kazakhstan)	MF	6 January 1993 (aged 28)	SDYuSShOR-8	2021		23	0
23	Askhat Baltabekov	(Kazakhstan)	MF	6 November 1993 (aged 27)	Youth Team	2010			
44	Gabriel Enache	(Romania)	MF	18 August 1990 (aged 31)	FCSB	2021		25	1
73	Aibar Aidarbekuly	(Kazakhstan)	MF	2 March 2002 (aged 19)	Youth Team	2021		1	0
Forwards
9	Aybar Zhaksylykov	(Kazakhstan)	FW	16 January 1993 (aged 28)	Youth Team	2019		59	16
25	Ugochukwu Oduenyi	(Nigeria)	FW	3 February 1996 (aged 25)	Mynai	2021		7	1
29	Dias Kalybayev	(Kazakhstan)	FW	25 August 1999 (aged 22)	Youth Team	2020		21	1
67	Ravil Atykhanov	(Kazakhstan)	FW	25 November 1999 (aged 21)	Youth Team	2021		28	1
79	Aleksey Mikhaylov	(Kazakhstan)	FW	21 July 2001 (aged 20)	Youth Team	2021		11	2
Players away on loan
Left during the season
5	Aleksandr Kislitsyn	(Kazakhstan)	DF	8 March 1986 (aged 35)	Unattached	2021		9	1
11	Edige Oralbay	(Kazakhstan)	FW	11 March 1997 (aged 24)	Youth Team	2021		4	0
12	Philip Ipole	(Nigeria)	DF	6 June 2001 (aged 20)	Sochi	2021		7	0
20	Aliyu Abubakar	(Nigeria)	DF	15 June 1996 (aged 25)	Okzhetpes	2021		3	0
25	Denis Poyarkov	(Russia)	MF	16 October 1989 (aged 32)	Tom Tomsk	2021		14	0
77	Akmal Bakhtiyarov	(Kazakhstan)	MF	2 June 1998 (aged 23)	Sochi	2021		5	0
88	Madi Khaseyn	(Kazakhstan)	DF	17 December 2000 (aged 20)	Youth Team	2021		5	0
99	Bauyrzhan Turysbek	(Kazakhstan)	FW	15 October 1991 (aged 30)	Taraz	2021		8	2

== Transfers ==
=== In ===
Date	Position	Nationality	Name	From	Fee	Ref.
8 May 2021	DF	(Kazakhstan)	Damir Dautov	Ordabasy	Undisclosed	
8 May 2021	DF	(Ukraine)	Rizvan Ablitarov	Olimpik Donetsk	Undisclosed	
2 July 2021	DF	(Ukraine)	Temur Partsvania	Mykolaiv	Undisclosed	
30 July 2021	MF	(Georgia (country))	Tengiz Tsikaridze	Tom Tomsk	Undisclosed	
25 August 2021	FW	(Nigeria)	Ugochukwu Oduenyi	Mynai	Undisclosed	

=== Out ===
Date	Position	Nationality	Name	To	Fee	Ref.
1 July 2021	MF	(Russia)	Denis Poyarkov	Metallurg Lipetsk	Undisclosed	
9 July 2021	MF	(Kazakhstan)	Akmal Bakhtiyarov	Olimp-Dolgoprudny	Undisclosed	
16 July 2021	DF	(Nigeria)	Philip Ipole	Olimp-Dolgoprudny	Undisclosed	
21 July 2021	MF	(Kazakhstan)	Madi Khaseyn	Makhtaaral	Undisclosed	

=== Released ===
Date	Position	Nationality	Name	Joined	Date	Ref.
30 June 2021	DF	(Kazakhstan)	Aleksandr Kislitsyn			
30 June 2021	DF	(Kazakhstan)	Andrey Shabaev			
30 June 2021	DF	(Nigeria)	Aliyu Abubakar			
30 June 2021	FW	(Kazakhstan)	Bauyrzhan Turysbek			

== Competitions ==
=== Overview ===
Competition	First match	Last match	Starting round	Final position	Record							
Competition	First match	Last match	Starting round	Final position	Pld	W	D	L	GF	GA	GD	Win %
Premier League	14 March 2021	29 October 2021	Matchday 1	12th	26	5	4	17	23	47	−24	19.23
Kazakhstan Cup	10 July 2021	14 August 2021	Group stage	Group stage	6	2	1	3	3	5	−2	33.33
Total					32	7	5	20	26	52	−26	21.88

Last updated: 30 October 2021
Source: Competitions

=== Premier League ===
==== Results summary ====
Overall								Home						Away					
Pld	W	D	L	GF	GA	GD	Pts	W	D	L	GF	GA	GD	W	D	L	GF	GA	GD
26	5	4	17	23	47	−24	16	2	3	8	11	22	−11	3	1	9	12	25	−13

Last updated: 30 October 2021.
Source: See Results

==== Results by round ====
Round	1	2	3	4	5	6	7	8	9	10	11	12	13	14	15	16	17	18	19	20	21	22	23	24	25	26
Ground	A	H	A	H	A	H	A	H	A	H	A	A	H	A	H	A	H	A	H	A	H	A	H	H	A	H
Result	L	W	L	L	D	L	L	L	L	L	L	W	W	W	L	L	L	L	D	L	D	L	L	L	W	D
Position	14	6	9	10	10	12	13	13	14	14	14	14	13	12	12	13	13	13	14	14	14	14	14	14	14	14

Source: See Results
A = Away; H = Home; W = Win; D = Draw; L = Loss

==== Results ====
13 March 2021 1	Kairat	2 – 0	Zhetysu	Almaty
15:00 (UTC+6)	Palyakow (red card) 49'; Kosović 69'; Alykulov 72'	Report	A.Dzhanuzakov (yellow card) 36'; Ipole (yellow card) 60'; Poyarkov (yellow card) 67'; Kislitsyn (yellow card) 81'	Stadium: Central Stadium; Attendance: 0 Referee: Timur Kumashev
Note: Match played behind closed doors due to the COVID-19 pandemic in Kazakhstan.

20 March 2021 2	Zhetysu	3 – 0	Turan	Taldıqorğan
14:00 (UTC+6)	Dmitrijev 4'; A.Adil (yellow card) 53' (goal) 68'; A.Baltabekov 76'	Report	B.Alipbekov (yellow card) 84'	Stadium: Zhetysu Stadium; Attendance: 0 Referee: Alexander Zatula
Note: Match played behind closed doors due to the COVID-19 pandemic in Kazakhstan.

4 April 2021 3	Caspiy	2 – 0	Zhetysu	Aktau
16:00 (UTC+6)	Mingazow (yellow card) 8' (goal) 83'; Sahli 12' (pen.); Vorotnikov (yellow card) 35'	Report	Dmitrijev (yellow card) 81'	Stadium: Zhastar Stadium; Attendance: 900; Referee: Saken Bayimbet

10 April 2021 4	Zhetysu	0 – 2	Tobol	Taldıqorğan
15:00 (UTC+6)	A.Adil (yellow card) 57'; R.Aslan (yellow card) 76'	Report	Amanović 25'; S.Zharynbetov (yellow card) 33'; Jovančić (yellow card) 63'; Lobjanidze 74'; Muzhikov (yellow card) 85'	Stadium: Zhetysu Stadium; Attendance: 0 Referee: Alexander Gauser
Note: Match played behind closed doors due to the COVID-19 pandemic in Kazakhstan.

14 April 2021 5	Atyrau	2 – 2	Zhetysu	Atyrau
18:00 (UTC+6)	Stojković (yellow card) 64'; D.Mazhitov (yellow card) 67' (yellow-red card) 71'; Kunić 76' (pen.); A.Baltabekov 90+3' (o.g.)	Report	Turysbek 37', 68' (pen.) (yellow card) 75'; E.Oralbay (yellow card) 41'; Dmitrijev (yellow card) 71'; Kavlinov (yellow card) 85'	Stadium: Munaishy Stadium; Attendance: 0 Referee: Rustam Omarov
Note: Match played behind closed doors due to the COVID-19 pandemic in Kazakhstan.

19 April 2021 6	Zhetysu	0 – 4	Ordabasy	Taldıqorğan
15:00 (UTC+6)	Orynbasar (yellow card) 45'	Report	Simčević 27'; Astanov 57'; João Paulo 60'; Z.Sultaniyazov (yellow card) 85'; Mehanović 90+4' (pen.)	Stadium: Zhetysu Stadium; Attendance: 0 Referee: Grigory Moskovchenko
Note: Match played behind closed doors due to the COVID-19 pandemic in Kazakhstan.

24 April 2021 7	Kyzylzhar	3 – 0	Zhetysu	Petropavl
15:00 (UTC+6)	Karshakevich 20'; A.Kasym (yellow card) 44'; Danilo 80'	Report	A.Adakhadzhiev (yellow card) 38'	Stadium: Karasai Stadium; Attendance: 1,800; Referee: Bolat Karlibaev

29 April 2021 8	Zhetysu	0 – 1	Shakhter Karagandy	Taldıqorğan
16:00 (UTC+6)	A.Dzhanuzakov (yellow card) 26'	Report	R.Aslan 34' (o.g.); M.Gabyshev (yellow card) 56'	Stadium: Zhetysu Stadium; Attendance: 0 Referee: Alexander Gauser
Note: Match played behind closed doors due to the COVID-19 pandemic in Kazakhstan.

3 May 2021 9	Akzhayik	3 – 2	Zhetysu	Oral
18:00 (UTC+6)	Kovtalyuk 23', 51', 86'; Tapalov (yellow card) 49'; Takulov (yellow card) 90+1'	Report	Turysbek (yellow card) 30'; Kislitsyn 42'; R.Jalilov (yellow card) 80'; A.Adakhadzhiev 73'; Zhaksylykov (yellow card) 90'	Stadium: Petr Atoyan Stadium; Attendance: 0 Referee: Alexander Zatula
Note: Match played behind closed doors due to the COVID-19 pandemic in Kazakhstan.

9 May 2021 10	Zhetysu	1 – 5	Aktobe	Taldıqorğan
16:00 (UTC+6)	Dmitrijev (penalty missed) 6'; R.Atykhanov 6'; Ipole (yellow card) 25' (yellow-red card) 29'; Kislitsyn (yellow card) 37'; Kalpachuk (yellow card) 44'; D.Dautov (yellow card) 59'; A.Adil (yellow card) 64'	Report	Manucharyan (red card) 5'; Narzikulov (yellow card) 7'; A.Tanzharikov (yellow card) 7'; Pertsukh 10'; Sergeyev 31', 71', 74'; R.Temirkhan (yellow card) 45'; Dubajić 60'	Stadium: Zhetysu Stadium; Attendance: 0 Referee: Artem Kuchin
Note: Match played behind closed doors due to the COVID-19 pandemic in Kazakhstan.

14 May 2021 11	Astana	1 – 0	Zhetysu	Nur-Sultan
20:00 (UTC+6)	Tomasov 4'; Ebong (yellow card) 44'; Barseghyan (yellow card) 57'; Nepohodov (yellow card) 71'; Murtazayev (yellow card) 86'; Beisebekov (yellow card) 90'	Report	Dmitrijev (yellow card) 36'; S.Batyrkhanov (yellow card) 51'	Stadium: Astana Arena; Attendance: 2,500; Referee: Denis Tevyashov

19 May 2021 12	Taraz	2 – 3	Zhetysu	Taraz
18:00 (UTC+6)	Eugénio 2' (yellow card) 58'; Baytana 70'	Report	Dmitrijev 32'; Poyarkov (yellow card) 44'; Enache 47'; Zhaksylykov 72'; Ablitarov (yellow card) 82'	Stadium: Central Stadium; Attendance: 2,000; Referee: Sayat Karabayev

23 May 2021 13	Zhetysu	2 – 0	Kaisar	Taldıqorğan
17:00 (UTC+6)	A.Adakhadzhiev 31'; A.Adil (yellow card) 45' (goal) 59'; Kalpachuk (yellow card) 90'	Report	Narzildayev (yellow card) 51'	Stadium: Zhetysu Stadium; Attendance: 0 Referee: Bulat Sariev
Note: Match played behind closed doors due to the COVID-19 pandemic in Kazakhstan.

28 May 2021 14	Turan	0 – 2	Zhetysu	Turkistan
20:00 (UTC+6)	Zaleski (yellow card) 20'; Adams (yellow card) 58' (yellow-red card) 74'; A.Mukhamed (yellow card) 60'; Kerimzhanov (yellow card) 90+5'	Report	N.Nurbergen 51'; Zhaksylykov 64' (pen.); M.Khaseyn (yellow card) 83'	Stadium: Turkistan Arena; Attendance: 1,400; Referee: Raul Jalilov

12 June 2021 15	Zhetysu	0 – 1	Caspiy	Taldıqorğan
18:00 (UTC+6)	Zhaksylykov (penalty missed) 64'; Dmitrijev (yellow card) 71'; D.Kalybaev (yellow card) 90'	Report	Tigroudja 18'; Darabayev (yellow card) 42'; B.Kabylan (yellow card) 49'	Stadium: Zhetysu Stadium; Attendance: 750; Referee: Alexander Zatula

19 June 2021 16	Tobol	2 – 1	Zhetysu	Kostanay
19:00 (UTC+6)	Nikolić 36' (pen.); Nurgaliyev 48' (pen.); Amanović (yellow card) 62'; Silva (yellow card) 67'; Valiullin (yellow card) 82'	Report	A.Adil 19'; A.Adakhadzhiev (yellow card) 38'; Ablitarov (yellow card) 44'; M.Golubnichy (yellow card) 47'; N.Nurbergen (yellow card) 66'	Stadium: Central Stadium; Attendance: 3,000; Referee: Grigory Moskovchenko

23 June 2021 17	Zhetysu	1 – 2	Atyrau	Taldıqorğan
18:00 (UTC+6)	Kalpachuk (yellow card) 23'; A.Baltabekov (yellow card) 56'; Dmitrijev 75'	Report	Grzelczak 63'; K.Kalmuratov (yellow card) 69'; Bryan 82'	Stadium: Zhetysu Stadium; Attendance: 0 Referee: Denis Tevyashov
Note: Match played behind closed doors due to the COVID-19 pandemic in Kazakhstan.

27 June 2021 18	Ordabasy	3 – 0	Zhetysu	Shymkent
20:00 (UTC+6)	Khizhnichenko 13'; Mehanović 44', 67' Diakate (yellow card) 62'	Report	Poyarkov (yellow card) 48'	Stadium: Kazhymukan Munaitpasov Stadium; Attendance: 2,000; Referee: Aydin Rakhimbaev

3 July 2021 19	Zhetysu	0 – 0	Kyzylzhar	Taldıqorğan
18:00 (UTC+6)	D.Dautov (yellow card) 46'; S.Batyrkhanov (yellow card) 70'	Report	Drachenko (yellow card) 60'; Murachyov (yellow card) 82'	Stadium: Zhetysu Stadium; Attendance: 1,500; Referee: Elvira Nurmustafina

12 September 2021 20	Shakhter Karagandy	3 – 1	Zhetysu	Karaganda
17:00 (UTC+6)	Omirtayev 7', 20'; A.Nazimkhanov (yellow card) 30'; Shikavka 41'	Report	Oduenyi 33'; A.Baltabekov (yellow card) 83'	Stadium: Shakhter Stadium; Attendance: 0 Referee: Igor Chesnokov
Note: Match played behind closed doors due to the COVID-19 pandemic in Kazakhstan.

18 September 2021 21	Zhetysu	2 – 2	Akzhayik	Taldıqorğan
15:00 (UTC+6)	Zhaksylykov 57'; R.Jalilov 74'	Report	E.Abdrakhmanov (yellow card) 53'; I.Antipov (yellow card) 63'; Kozlov 64'; Tapalov 80'	Stadium: Zhetysu Stadium; Attendance: 300; Referee: Danil Gorda

26 September 2021 22	Aktobe	2 – 0	Zhetysu	Aktobe
18:00 (UTC+6)	Balashov 17'; Moukam 28'; Adukor (yellow card) 45'; Žulpa (yellow card) 70'	Report	Partsvania (yellow card) 30'; Oduenyi (yellow card) 43'; D.Dautov (yellow card) 77'	Stadium: Central Stadium; Attendance: 4,000; Referee: Rustam Omarov

2 October 2021 23	Zhetysu	1 – 3	Astana	Taldıqorğan
15:00 (UTC+6)	V.Okhronchuk (yellow card) 17'; S.Batyrkhanov (yellow card) 29'; Zhaksylykov 37'; D.Kalybaev (yellow card) 90+2'	Report	Tomasov 21', 39' (yellow card) 43'; Bećiraj 56'	Stadium: Zhetysu Stadium; Attendance: 800; Referee: Grigory Moskovchenko

17 October 2021 24	Zhetysu	1 – 2	Taraz	Taldıqorğan
14:00 (UTC+6)	Dmitrijev (yellow card) 12'; D.Kalybayev 86'	Report	A.Taubay (yellow card) 15'; Adamović 67'; Dosmagambetov 90+2'; B.Shaykhov (yellow card) 90+5'	Stadium: Zhetysu Stadium; Attendance: 1,00; Referee: Aydin Rakhimbaev

24 October 2021 25	Kaisar	0 – 1	Zhetysu	Kyzylorda
19:00 (UTC+6)	I.Amirseitov (yellow card) 55' (yellow-red card) 59'; N'Diaye (yellow card) 60'; Kenesov (yellow card) 61'; Bayzhanov (yellow card) 74'	Report	N.Nurbergen (yellow card) 18'; Dmitrijev 38'; Partsvania (yellow card) 60'	Stadium: Gani Muratbayev Stadium; Attendance: 950; Referee: Sergey Gorokhovodatsky

30 October 2021 26	Zhetysu	0 – 0	Kairat	Taldıqorğan
14:00 (UTC+6)	Kavlinov (yellow card) 34'; Zhaksylykov (yellow card) 77'	Report		Stadium: Zhetysu Stadium; Attendance: 2,000; Referee: Danil Gorda

==== League table ====
Pos	Team	Pld	W	D	L	GF	GA	GD	Pts	Qualification or relegation
10	Taraz	26	7	8	11	27	34	−7	29	
11	Atyrau	26	7	7	12	25	40	−15	28	
12	Turan	26	5	11	10	22	40	−18	26	
13	Kaisar (R)	26	4	7	15	24	44	−20	19	Relegation to the Kazakhstan First Division
14	Zhetysu (Note: Zhetysu had three points deducted on 10 March 2021 as a punishment for the unavailability of their nominated reserve stadium for their second match-day fixture.) (R)	26	5	4	17	23	47	−24	16	Relegation to the Kazakhstan First Division

Source: UEFA, Soccerway
Rules for classification: 1) Points; 2) Goal difference; 3) Matches won; 4) Goals scored; 5) Away goals scored; 6) Head-to-head points; 7) Head-to-head matches won; 8) Head-to-head goal difference; 9) Head-to-head goals scored; 10) Head-to-head away goals scored; 11) Draw.
(R) Relegated

=== Kazakhstan Cup ===
==== Group stage ====
Pos	Team	Pld	W	D	L	GF	GA	GD	Pts	Qualification
1	Caspiy (A)	6	4	1	1	10	4	+6	13	Advanced to Quarterfinals
2	Kairat (A)	6	3	0	3	11	9	+2	9	Advanced to Quarterfinals
3	Zhetysu	6	2	1	3	3	5	−2	7	
4	Turan	6	2	0	4	5	11	−6	6	

Updated to match(es) played on 15 August 2021. Source: PFLK
(A) Advance to a further round

10 July 2021 1	Zhetysu	0 – 1	Kairat	Taldıqorğan
18:00 (UTC+6)	Ablitarov (yellow card) 51'	Report	A.Ulshin 10'; A.Buranchiev (yellow card) 25'; Alykulov (yellow card) 71'; S.Keiler (yellow card) 90+5'	Stadium: Zhetysu Stadium; Attendance: 0 Referee: Nariman Talapkerov
Note: Match played behind closed doors due to the COVID-19 pandemic in Kazakhstan.

18 July 2021 2	Turan	0 – 2	Zhetysu	Turkistan
21:00 (UTC+6)	Stanley (yellow card) 52'; T.Amirov (yellow card) 80'	Report	Dmitrijev 8'; Kalpachuk (yellow card) 32'; N.Nurbergen (yellow card) 75'; D.Kalybaev (yellow card) 81'; A.Adil 90+3'	Stadium: Turkistan Arena; Attendance: 1,400; Referee: Sergey Gorokhovodatsky

25 July 2021 3	Caspiy	1 – 0	Zhetysu	Aktau
20:00 (UTC+6)	Cuckić (yellow card) 44'; Sahli 76'; R.Zhanysbaev (yellow card) 90+1'	Report	A.Baltabekov (yellow card) 49'; Kalpachuk (yellow card) 52'	Stadium: Zhastar Stadium; Attendance: 0 Referee: Alexander Zatula
Note: Match played behind closed doors due to the COVID-19 pandemic in Kazakhstan.

1 August 2021 4	Zhetysu	0 – 0	Caspiy	Taldıqorğan
18:00 (UTC+6)	Enache (penalty missed) 57'	Report	N.Ayazbaev (yellow card) 56'	Stadium: Zhetysu Stadium; Attendance: 0 Referee: Bolat Karlibaev
Note: Match played behind closed doors due to the COVID-19 pandemic in Kazakhstan.

8 August 2021 5	Kairat	3 – 0	Zhetysu	Almaty
19:00 (UTC+6)	Shushenachev 4', 18' (yellow card) 38'; Dugalić 61'	Report		Stadium: Central Stadium; Attendance: 0 Referee: Bulat Sariev
Note: Match played behind closed doors due to the COVID-19 pandemic in Kazakhstan.

14 August 2021 6	Zhetysu	1 – 0	Turan	Taldıqorğan
18:00 (UTC+6)	A.Mikhaylov 8'; A.Baltabekov (yellow card) 44'; R.Atykhanov (yellow card) 47'	Report	Zaleski (yellow card) 79'	Stadium: Zhetysu Stadium; Attendance: 0 Referee: Alexander Gauser
Note: Match played behind closed doors due to the COVID-19 pandemic in Kazakhstan.

== Squad statistics ==
As of match played 30 October 2021

=== Appearances and goals ===
No.	Pos	Nat	Player	Total		Premier League		Kazakhstan Cup	
No.	Pos	Nat	Player	Apps	Goals	Apps	Goals	Apps	Goals
1	GK	(Kazakhstan) KAZ	Andrey Shabanov	10	0	8+1	0	1	0
2	DF	(Kazakhstan) KAZ	Temirlan Adilkhanov	10	0	1+4	0	2+3	0
3	DF	(Kazakhstan) KAZ	Sanjar Batyrkhanov	12	0	9+2	0	0+1	0
4	DF	(Kazakhstan) KAZ	Maxim Chalkin	1	0	1	0	0	0
5	MF	(Ukraine) UKR	Vladyslav Okhronchuk	10	0	7	0	2+1	0
6	MF	(Kazakhstan) KAZ	Adam Adakhadzhiev	27	2	20+4	2	3	0
7	MF	(Kazakhstan) KAZ	Aslan Adil	29	4	17+6	3	5+1	1
8	MF	(Estonia) EST	Artjom Dmitrijev	30	5	23+1	4	5+1	1
9	FW	(Kazakhstan) KAZ	Aybar Zhaksylykov	19	4	14+4	4	0+1	0
10	MF	(Kyrgyzstan) KGZ	Raul Jalilov	14	1	4+8	1	2	0
14	DF	(Kazakhstan) KAZ	Rafkat Aslan	6	0	3+2	0	0+1	0
15	DF	(Kazakhstan) KAZ	Rauan Orynbasar	18	0	11+5	0	1+1	0
17	MF	(Kazakhstan) KAZ	Nurbol Nurbergen	22	1	4+13	1	3+2	0
20	MF	(Georgia (country)) GEO	Tengiz Tsikaridze	4	0	2+2	0	0	0
21	GK	(Kazakhstan) KAZ	Mikhail Golubnichy	11	0	11	0	0	0
22	MF	(Kazakhstan) KAZ	Aslan Dzhanuzakov	23	0	6+11	0	6	0
23	MF	(Kazakhstan) KAZ	Askhat Baltabekov	32	1	21+5	1	5+1	0
25	FW	(Nigeria) NGR	Ugochukwu Oduenyi	7	1	7	1	0	0
26	DF	(Kazakhstan) KAZ	Damir Dautov	13	0	9+1	0	3	0
29	FW	(Kazakhstan) KAZ	Dias Kalybayev	20	1	9+9	1	0+2	0
44	MF	(Romania) ROU	Gabriel Enache	25	1	12+7	1	5+1	0
48	DF	(Kazakhstan) KAZ	Dilshat Musaev	5	0	2+3	0	0	0
55	DF	(Ukraine) UKR	Rizvan Ablitarov	20	0	14+1	0	5	0
59	DF	(Belarus) BLR	Illya Kalpachuk	16	0	7+5	0	4	0
67	FW	(Kazakhstan) KAZ	Ravil Atykhanov	28	1	10+12	1	3+3	0
70	GK	(Russia) RUS	Denis Kavlinov	12	0	7	0	5	0
73	MF	(Kazakhstan) KAZ	Aibar Aidarbekuly	1	0	0	0	0+1	0
77	DF	(Ukraine) UKR	Temur Partsvania	13	0	7	0	6	0
79	FW	(Kazakhstan) KAZ	Aleksey Mikhaylov	11	2	0+7	1	0+4	1
Players away from Zhetysu on loan:
Players who left Zhetysu during the season:
5	DF	(Kazakhstan) KAZ	Aleksandr Kislitsyn	9	1	9	1	0	0
11	FW	(Kazakhstan) KAZ	Edige Oralbay	4	0	1+3	0	0	0
12	DF	(Nigeria) NGR	Philip Ipole	7	0	7	0	0	0
20	DF	(Nigeria) NGR	Aliyu Abubakar	3	0	3	0	0	0
25	MF	(Russia) RUS	Denis Poyarkov	14	0	11+3	0	0	0
27	DF	(Kazakhstan) KAZ	Andrey Shabaev	2	0	2	0	0	0
77	MF	(Kazakhstan) KAZ	Akmal Bakhtiyarov	5	0	2+3	0	0	0
88	DF	(Kazakhstan) KAZ	Madi Khaseyn	5	0	0+4	0	0+1	0
99	FW	(Kazakhstan) KAZ	Bauyrzhan Turysbek	8	2	5+3	2	0	0

=== Goal scorers ===
Place	Position	Nation	Number	Name	Premier League	Kazakhstan Cup	Total
1	MF	(Estonia)	8	Artjom Dmitrijev	4	1	5
2	FW	(Kazakhstan)	9	Aybar Zhaksylykov	4	0	4
2	MF	(Kazakhstan)	7	Aslan Adil	3	1	4
4	FW	(Kazakhstan)	99	Bauyrzhan Turysbek	2	0	2
4	MF	(Kazakhstan)	6	Adam Adakhadzhiev	2	0	2
6	MF	(Kazakhstan)	23	Askhat Baltabekov	1	0	1
6	DF	(Kazakhstan)	5	Aleksandr Kislitsyn	1	0	1
6	FW	(Kazakhstan)	67	Ravil Atykhanov	1	0	1
6	MF	(Kyrgyzstan)	10	Raul Jalilov	1	0	1
6	FW	(Kazakhstan)	29	Dias Kalybayev	1	0	1
6	MF	(Kazakhstan)	17	Nurbol Nurbergen	1	0	1
6	FW	(Nigeria)	25	Ugochukwu Oduenyi	1	0	1
6	MF	(Romania)	44	Gabriel Enache	1	0	1
6	FW	(Kazakhstan)	79	Aleksey Mikhaylov	0	1	1
				TOTALS	23	3	26

=== Clean sheets ===
Place	Position	Nation	Number	Name	Premier League	Kazakhstan Cup	Total
1	GK	(Russia)	70	Denis Kavlinov	2	3	5
2	GK	(Kazakhstan)	21	Mikhail Golubnichy	3	0	3
3	GK	(Kazakhstan)	1	Andrey Shabanov	1	0	1
				TOTALS	6	3	9

=== Disciplinary record ===
Number	Nation	Position	Name	Premier League		Kazakhstan Cup		Total	
Number	Nation	Position	Name	Booked	Sent off (straight red)	Booked	Sent off (straight red)	Booked	Sent off (straight red)
3	(Kazakhstan)	DF	Sanjar Batyrkhanov	3	0	0	0	3	0
5	(Ukraine)	MF	Vladyslav Okhronchuk	1	0	0	0	1	0
6	(Kazakhstan)	MF	Adam Adakhadzhiev	2	0	0	0	2	0
7	(Kazakhstan)	MF	Aslan Adil	4	0	0	0	4	0
8	(Estonia)	MF	Artjom Dmitrijev	5	0	0	0	5	0
9	(Kazakhstan)	FW	Aybar Zhaksylykov	2	0	0	0	2	0
10	(Kyrgyzstan)	MF	Raul Jalilov	1	0	0	0	1	0
14	(Kazakhstan)	DF	Rafkat Aslan	1	0	0	0	1	0
15	(Kazakhstan)	DF	Rauan Orynbasar	1	0	0	0	1	0
17	(Kazakhstan)	MF	Nurbol Nurbergen	2	0	1	0	3	0
21	(Kazakhstan)	GK	Mikhail Golubnichy	1	0	0	0	1	0
22	(Kazakhstan)	MF	Aslan Dzhanuzakov	2	0	0	0	2	0
23	(Kazakhstan)	MF	Askhat Baltabekov	2	0	2	0	4	0
25	(Nigeria)	FW	Ugochukwu Oduenyi	1	0	1	0	2	0
26	(Kazakhstan)	DF	Damir Dautov	3	0	0	0	3	0
29	(Kazakhstan)	FW	Dias Kalybayev	2	0	1	0	3	0
55	(Ukraine)	DF	Rizvan Ablitarov	2	0	1	0	3	0
59	(Belarus)	DF	Illya Kalpachuk	3	0	2	0	5	0
67	(Kazakhstan)	FW	Ravil Atykhanov	0	0	1	0	1	0
70	(Russia)	GK	Denis Kavlinov	2	0	0	0	2	0
77	(Ukraine)	DF	Temur Partsvania	2	0	0	0	2	0
Players who left Zhetysu during the season:
5	(Kazakhstan)	DF	Aleksandr Kislitsyn	2	0	0	0	2	0
11	(Kazakhstan)	FW	Edige Oralbay	1	0	0	0	1	0
12	(Nigeria)	DF	Philip Ipole	3	1	0	0	3	1
25	(Russia)	MF	Denis Poyarkov	3	0	0	0	3	0
88	(Kazakhstan)	MF	Madi Khaseyn	1	0	0	0	1	0
99	(Kazakhstan)	FW	Bauyrzhan Turysbek	2	0	0	0	2	0
			TOTALS	54	1	8	0	62	1
