= 2014 FC Zhetysu season =

FC Zhetysu
2014 season
- Chairman: Evgeniy Nam
- Manager: Omari Tetradze (until September 2014); Askar Kozhabergenov (from September 2014)
- Stadium: Zhetysu Stadium
- Kazakhstan Premier League: 8th
- Kazakhstan Cup: First round vs Gefest
- Top goalscorer: League: Sergei Schaff (4); All: Sergei Schaff (4)
Home colours	Away colours

The 2014 FC Zhetysu season was the 8th successive season that the club playing in the Kazakhstan Premier League, the highest tier of association football in Kazakhstan, and 18th in total. Zhetysu finished the season in 8th position, whilst also being knocked out of the Kazakhstan Cup at the First-Round by Gefest.

In September 2014, Omari Tetradze and his coaching staff left Zhetysu by mutual consent.

== Squad ==
Note: Flags indicate national team as defined under FIFA eligibility rules; some limited exceptions apply. Players may hold more than one non-FIFA nationality.

No.	Pos.	Nation	Player
2	DF	KAZ	Temirlan Adilkhanov
4	DF	CIV	Didier Kadio (loan from Shirak)
7	FW	KAZ	Sergei Schaff
9	FW	KAZ	Beibut Tatishev
10	MF	KAZ	Konstantin Zarechny
11	MF	KAZ	Konstantin Zotov
12	DF	KAZ	Ruslan Esatov
14	DF	KAZ	Nurzhan Nusipzhanov
16	GK	KAZ	Erik Duysenbekuly
19	MF	KAZ	Taras Danilyuk
20	GK	KAZ	Andrey Pasechenko

No.	Pos.	Nation	Player
21	FW	BIH	Mersudin Ahmetović
22	MF	KAZ	Sayat Sariyev
23	DF	KAZ	Berik Shaikhov
24	DF	KAZ	Viktor Kovalev
28	DF	KAZ	Vladislav Kuzmin
29	DF	LTU	Arūnas Klimavičius
33	GK	KAZ	Vladimir Plotnikov
50	MF	KAZ	Alisher Yesimkhanov
77	MF	SRB	Marko Putinčanin
79	FW	CIV	Boti Goa
—	DF	TJK	Davron Ergashev
—	FW	KAZ	Rauan Sariyev

== Transfers ==
=== Winter ===
In: Note: Flags indicate national team as defined under FIFA eligibility rules; some limited exceptions apply. Players may hold more than one non-FIFA nationality.

No.	Pos.	Nation	Player
4	DF	CIV	Didier Kadio (loan from (Armenia) Shirak)
6	MF	KAZ	Denis Rodionov (from (Kazakhstan) Atyrau)
21	FW	BIH	Mersudin Ahmetović (from (Russia) Salyut Belgorod)
77	MF	SRB	Marko Putinčanin (from (Serbia) Bežanija)
79	FW	CIV	Boti Goa (from (Armenia) Shirak)

Out: Note: Flags indicate national team as defined under FIFA eligibility rules; some limited exceptions apply. Players may hold more than one non-FIFA nationality.

No.	Pos.	Nation	Player
1	GK	KAZ	Anton Tsirin (to (Kazakhstan) Atyrau)
4	DF	BIH	Mehmedalija Čović (to (Bosnia and Herzegovina) Čelik Zenica)
5	DF	KAZ	Damir Dautov (to (Kazakhstan) Kaisar)
6	DF	TJK	Davron Ergashev (to (Azerbaijan) Gabala)
7	MF	KAZ	Serikzhan Muzhikov (to (Kazakhstan) Astana)
8	MF	KAZ	Dmitriy Mamonov
9	MF	UZB	Shavkat Salomov (to (Kazakhstan) Shakhter Karagandy)
13	MF	UZB	Ruslan Melziddinov (to (Uzbekistan) Neftchi)
16	GK	KAZ	Sergei Stepanenko
17	DF	KAZ	Vladimir Yakovlev
18	MF	KAZ	Maksim Azovskiy (to (Kazakhstan) Spartak Semey)
33	FW	SRB	Ivan Perić (to (Turkey) Mersin İdmanyurdu)

=== Summer ===
In: Note: Flags indicate national team as defined under FIFA eligibility rules; some limited exceptions apply. Players may hold more than one non-FIFA nationality.

No.	Pos.	Nation	Player
—	DF	TJK	Davron Ergashev (from (Azerbaijan) Gabala)

Out: Note: Flags indicate national team as defined under FIFA eligibility rules; some limited exceptions apply. Players may hold more than one non-FIFA nationality.

No.	Pos.	Nation	Player
6	MF	KAZ	Denis Rodionov
17	MF	KAZ	Abylaikhan Totay (to (Kazakhstan) Irtysh)
86	MF	SRB	Marko Đalović

== Friendlies ==
26 January 2014	CSKA Sofia (Bulgaria)	0 – 0	(Kazakhstan) Zhetysu	Turkey
(UTC+6)		Summary

28 January 2014	Rotor Volgograd (Russia)	2 – 4	(Kazakhstan) Zhetysu	Turkey
(UTC+6)	Goal	Summary	K.Zarechny; Khmaladze; A.Thoth; N.Nusipzhanov

1 February 2014	Wisła Kraków (Poland)	2 – 2	(Kazakhstan) Zhetysu	Turkey
(UTC+6)	Goal	Summary	B.Tatishev (.)

5 February 2014	Suwon Samsung Bluewings (South Korea)	1 – 0	(Kazakhstan) Zhetysu	Turkey
(UTC+6)	Goal	Summary

9 February 2014	Milsami Orhei (Moldova)	0 – 0	(Kazakhstan) Zhetysu	Turkey
(UTC+6)		Summary

16 February 2014	Oleksandriya (Ukraine)	1 – 1	(Kazakhstan) Zhetysu	Turkey
(UTC+6)	Goal	Summary	S.Schaff 63'

25 February 2014	Dynamo Saint Petersburg (Russia)	2 – 1	(Kazakhstan) Zhetysu	Turkey
(UTC+6)	Goal	Summary	S.Sariyev

== Competitions ==
=== Kazakhstan Premier League ===
==== First round ====
===== Results summary =====
Overall								Home						Away					
Pld	W	D	L	GF	GA	GD	Pts	W	D	L	GF	GA	GD	W	D	L	GF	GA	GD
22	7	6	9	15	18	−3	27	5	2	4	8	7	+1	2	4	5	7	11	−4

Last updated: 17 February 2015.
Source: Soccerway

===== Results =====
15 March 2014 1	Astana	0 – 0	Zhetysu	Astana
17:00 (UTC+6)	Aničić (yellow card) 84'	Summary	Klimavičius (yellow card) 90+5'	Stadium: Astana Arena; Attendance: 5,000; Referee: Bolat Karlibayev

22 March 2014 2	Zhetysu	1 – 0	Kairat	Taldykorgan
18:00 (UTC+6)	S.Schaff 20'; T.Adilkhanov (yellow card) 43'; Putinčanin (yellow card) 81'	Summary	Ceesay (yellow card) 23'; Nekhtiy (yellow card) 81'; Yedigaryan (yellow card) 90+2'	Stadium: Zhetysu Stadium; Attendance: 4,500; Referee: Igor Aleshin

29 March 2014 3	Tobol	0 – 2	Zhetysu	Kostanay
15:00 (UTC+6)	Petukhov (red card) 72'; Kučera (yellow card) 77'	Summary	T.Adilkhanov (yellow card) 6'; K.Zarechny 45' (yellow card) 68'; Rodionov (yellow card) 69'; S.Schaff 74' (pen.); Kovalev (yellow card) 90+4'	Stadium: Central Stadium; Attendance: 3,000; Referee: Artyom Kuchin

5 April 2014 4	Zhetysu	0 – 0	Irtysh	Taldykorgan
13:00 (UTC+6)	K.Zarechny (yellow card) 38'	Summary	Z.Korobov (yellow card) 11'; Mukhutdinov (yellow card) 24'; Džudović (yellow card) 42'; Burzanović (yellow card) 66'	Stadium: Zhetysu Stadium; Attendance: 3,000; Referee: Denis Tevyashov

9 April 2014 5	Aktobe	1 – 0	Zhetysu	Aktobe
17:00 (UTC+6)	Pizzelli 74'; A.Tagybergen (yellow card) 82'	Summary	Klimavičius (yellow card) 38'; K.Zarechny (red card) 82'	Stadium: Central Stadium; Attendance: 3,000; Referee: Igor Chesnokov

13 April 2014 6	Zhetysu	1 – 2	Shakhter Karagandy	Taldykorgan
16:00 (UTC+6)	S.Schaff 16'; Putinčanin (yellow card) 33'; Rodionov (yellow card) 46'	Summary	Baizhanov 21'; T.Zhangylyshbai 28'; Salomov (yellow card) 34'; Vičius (yellow card) 49'; Simčević (yellow card) 83'	Stadium: Zhetysu Stadium; Attendance: 2,500; Referee: Askhat Abdanbayev

19 April 2014 7	Spartak Semey	1 – 1	Zhetysu	Semey
16:00 (UTC+6)	Genev (yellow card) 65'; Kovačević 68'	Summary	B.Tatishev 5'; Kovalev (yellow card) 76'	Stadium: Spartak Stadium; Attendance: 1,000; Referee: Bagdat Abdullaev

27 April 2014 8	Zhetysu	1 – 0	Atyrau	Taldykorgan
17:00 (UTC+6)	A.Totay (yellow card) 29'; Kovalev 33' (yellow card) 33' (yellow-red card) 71'; Rodionov (yellow card) 41'; R.Esatov (yellow card) 55'; Putinčanin (yellow card) 85'; Plotnikov (yellow card) 90+5'	Summary	Odibe (yellow card) 10'; Rudzik (yellow card) 41'; Savio (yellow card) 61'; A.Shakin (yellow card) 83'	Stadium: Zhetysu Stadium; Attendance: 3,000; Referee: Viktor Antonov

1 May 2014 9	Taraz	1 – 0	Zhetysu	Taraz
15:00 (UTC+6)	Dosmagambetov (yellow card) 32'; Tleshev (yellow card) 71'; Shchetkin 88'	Summary	Đalović (yellow card) 45' (yellow-red card) 55'; Rodionov (yellow card) 83' (yellow-red card) 89'	Stadium: Central Stadium; Attendance: 4,000; Referee: Aleksandr Aliyev

6 May 2014 10	Ordabasy	1 – 1	Zhetysu	Shymkent
17:30 (UTC+6)	Nurgaliev 45' (pen.); Y.Levin (yellow card) 68'; G.Suyumbaev (yellow card) 71'	Summary	Z.Zarechny 31'; Ahmetović (yellow card) 58'; Kadio (yellow card) 60'; Shaikhov (yellow card) 62'	Stadium: Kazhimukan Munaitpasov Stadium; Attendance: 4,000; Referee: Artyom Kuchin

10 May 2014 11	Zhetysu	1 – 2	Kaisar	Taldykorgan
17:00 (UTC+6)	S.Sariyev 50'; K.Zarechny (yellow card) 84'	Summary	Hunt 12'; Strukov 82'	Stadium: Zhetysu Stadium; Attendance: 3,000; Referee: Aleksandr Gauzer

18 May 2014 12	Kairat	2 – 1	Zhetysu	Almaty
19:00 (UTC+6)	Ceesay 19'; Kislitsyn (yellow card) 50'; Lačný 85'; Knežević (yellow card) 90+1'	Summary	Shaikhov (yellow card) 21'; Rodionov (yellow card) 49'; S.Sariyev 90+2'	Stadium: Central Stadium; Attendance: 7,500; Referee: Marat Iskakov

24 May 2014 13	Zhetysu	1 – 2	Tobol	Taldykorgan
17:00 (UTC+6)	K.Zotov (yellow card) 35'; S.Sariyev (yellow card) 44'; Putinčanin (yellow card) 45+2'; Goa 63'	Summary	Šimkovič 36' (yellow card) 66'; Bugaiov 52'; Volkov (yellow card) 62'; Jeslínek (yellow card) 90+1'	Stadium: Zhetysu Stadium; Attendance: 2,500; Referee: Ruslan Duzmambetov

28 May 2014 14	Irtysh	1 – 0	Zhetysu	Pavlodar
19:00 (UTC+6)	Dudchenko 61'	Summary		Stadium: Central Stadium; Attendance: 2,500; Referee: Bagdat Abdullaev

1 June 2014 15	Zhetysu	1 – 0	Aktobe	Taldykorgan
17:00 (UTC+6)	Goa 26'; Putinčanin (yellow card) 84'	Summary	D.Miroshnichenko (yellow card) 15'; Shabalin (yellow card) 48'; Geynrikh (yellow card) 84'	Stadium: Zhetysu Stadium; Attendance: 3,000; Referee: Aleksandr Gauzer

14 June 2014 16	Shakhter Karagandy	3 – 0	Zhetysu	Karagandy
18:30 (UTC+6)	Vasiljević 4' (yellow card) 89'; Topcagić 13', 40'; Kirov (yellow card) 25'; Salomov (yellow card) 45+1'; Vičius (yellow card) 68'	Summary	Kovalev (yellow card) 48' (yellow-red card) 73'; Klimavičius (yellow card) 67'; Putinčanin (yellow card) 79'	Stadium: Shakhter Stadium; Attendance: 3,500; Referee: Anatolyi Vishnichenko

22 June 2014 17	Zhetysu	1 – 0	Spartak Semey	Taldykorgan
18:30 (UTC+6)	S.Schaff 16' (yellow card) 90+4'; K.Zotov (yellow card) 45+1'	Summary	Kutsov (yellow card) 44'	Stadium: Zhetysu Stadium; Attendance: 1,500; Referee: Timur Kumashev

28 June 2014 18	Atyrau	1 – 2	Zhetysu	Atyrau
20:00 (UTC+6)	Karpovich (yellow card) 36'; Rodionov 67' (o.g.)	Summary	Goa 10'; Kadio (yellow card) 37'; Rodionov (yellow card) 42' (goal) 85'; B.Tatishev (yellow card) 90'	Stadium: Munaishy Stadium; Attendance: 3,000; Referee: Denis Tevyashov

5 July 2014 19	Zhetysu	1 – 0	Taraz	Taldykorgan
18:00 (UTC+6)	V.Kuzmin (yellow card) 69'; Ahmetović 90+2' (yellow card) 90+3'	Summary	Roj (yellow card) 51'; Shchetkin (yellow card) 69'	Stadium: Zhetysu Stadium; Attendance: 3,500; Referee: Akmalkhan Kholmatov

12 July 2014 20	Zhetysu	0 – 1	Ordabasy	Taldykorgan
18:30 (UTC+6)	Goa (yellow card) 45+1'; Kadio (yellow card) 62'; Rodionov (yellow card) 81'	Summary	Kúdela (yellow card) 60'; Kasyanov 63'; Junuzović (yellow card) 81'; G.Suyumbaev (yellow card) 90+1'	Stadium: Zhetysu Stadium; Attendance: 3,500; Referee: Igor Khisamutdinov

26 July 2014 21	Kaisar	0 – 0	Zhetysu	Kyzylorda
19:00 (UTC+6)	Narzildaev (yellow card) 56'; Savić (yellow card) 71'	Summary		Stadium: Gany Muratbayev Stadium; Attendance: 3,500; Referee: Aleksandr Aliyev

3 August 2014 22	Zhetysu	0 – 0	Astana	Taldykorgan
18:00 (UTC+6)	Kovalev (yellow card) 47'; R.Esatov (yellow card) 55'; Goa (yellow card) 88'	Summary	Dmitrenko (yellow card) 27'; Nusserbayev (yellow card) 89'	Stadium: Zhetysu Stadium; Attendance: 3,000; Referee: Igor Aleshin

===== League table =====
Pos	Team	Pld	W	D	L	GF	GA	GD	Pts	Qualification
5	Ordabasy	22	10	5	7	24	22	+2	35	Qualification for the championship round
6	Kaisar	22	8	8	6	23	23	0	32	Qualification for the championship round
7	Zhetysu	22	7	6	9	15	18	−3	27	Qualification for the relegation round
8	Tobol	22	6	8	8	22	29	−7	26	Qualification for the relegation round
9	Irtysh Pavlodar	22	6	6	10	28	35	−7	24 (Note: ATY 0–1 IRT; IRT 0-1 ATY)	Qualification for the relegation round

Source: Soccerway (in Russian)
Rules for classification: 1st points;
Two team tiebreak: 1st overall wins; 2nd head-to-head record; 3rd goals difference; 4th goals scored; 5th away goals scored;
Multiple teams tiebreak: 1st overall wins; 2nd goals difference; 3rd goals scored; 4th away goals scored

==== Relegation Round ====
===== Results summary =====
Overall								Home						Away					
Pld	W	D	L	GF	GA	GD	Pts	W	D	L	GF	GA	GD	W	D	L	GF	GA	GD
10	3	2	5	6	13	−7	11	3	1	1	4	4	0	0	1	4	2	9	−7

Last updated: 17 February 2015.
Source: Soccerway

===== Results =====
23 August 2014 1	Irtysh	1 – 1	Zhetysu	Pavlodar
17:00 (UTC+6)	Chuchman (yellow card) 76'; Burzanović 89'	Summary	R.Sariyev (yellow card) 24'; R.Esatov 34'; S.Sariyev (yellow card) 46' (yellow-red card) 59'; Goa (yellow card) 90+3'; A.Pasechenko (yellow card) 90+4' (yellow-red card) 90+4'	Stadium: Central Stadium; Attendance: 1,500; Referee: Anatolyi Vishnichenko

29 August 2014 2	Taraz	2 – 0	Zhetysu	Taraz
19:00 (UTC+6)	Z.Kozhamberdy 40'; O.Nedashkovsky 43'; Kuchma (yellow card) 58'	Summary	Ergashev (yellow card) 81'; S.Schaff (yellow card) 85'	Stadium: Central Stadium; Attendance: 3,200; Referee: Akmalkhan Kholmatov

14 September 2014 3	Zhetysu	1 – 0	Atyrau	Taldykorgan
17:00 (UTC+6)	T.Danilyuk 15'; R.Sariyev (yellow card) 54'	Summary	Karpovich (yellow card) 13'; Abdulin (yellow card) 37'; E.Kostrub (yellow card) 83'	Stadium: Zhetysu Stadium; Attendance: 2,500; Referee: Ruslan Duzmambetov

20 September 2014 4	Spartak Semey	3 – 1	Zhetysu	Semey
16:30 (UTC+6)	Azovskiy 6'; Peev 24'; Jovanović 63' (pen.)	Summary	Kadio (yellow card) 17'; T.Danilyuk (yellow card) 45+1' (yellow-red card) 62'; Ahmetović 90+3'	Stadium: Spartak Stadium; Attendance: 1,500; Referee: Igor Khisamutdinov

28 September 2014 5	Zhetysu	0 – 0	Tobol	Taldykorgan
16:00 (UTC+6)	Ergashev (yellow card) 25'; S.Schaff (yellow card) 67'	Summary		Stadium: Zhetysu Stadium; Attendance: 2,000; Referee: Marat Iskakov

3 October 2014 6	Zhetysu	0 – 3	Taraz	Taldykorgan
16:00 (UTC+6)	Ergashev (yellow card) 45'; S.Sariyev (yellow card) 90+3'	Summary	O.Nedashkovsky (yellow card) 42'; Shchetkin 63'; Z.Kozhamberdy 76'; O.Yarovenko 79'	Stadium: Zhetysu Stadium; Attendance: 2,000; Referee: Aydin Rakhimbayev

19 October 2014 7	Atyrau	1 – 0	Zhetysu	Atyrau
17:00 (UTC+6)	Odibe 38'; Butuyev (yellow card) 90+2'	Summary	K.Zotov (yellow card) 49'; Klimavičius (yellow card) 61'	Stadium: Munaishy Stadium; Attendance: 800; Referee: Igor Aleshin

26 October 2014 8	Zhetysu	2 – 1	Spartak Semey	Taldykorgan
14:00 (UTC+6)	S.Sariyev (yellow card) 6'; Shaikhov (yellow card) 24' (goal) 74'; T.Danilyuk 58'; Ergashev (yellow card) 67'	Summary	S.Sagindikov (yellow card) 24'; Y.Nurgaliyev (yellow card) 40'; Kutsov 90+1'	Stadium: Zhetysu Stadium; Attendance: 3,000; Referee: Igor Khisamutdinov

1 November 2014 9	Tobol	2 – 0	Zhetysu	Kostanay
15:00 (UTC+6)	Šljivić (yellow card) 28'; A.Suley 31'; Zhumaskaliyev 78'	Summary	Shaikhov (yellow card) 86'	Stadium: Central Stadium; Attendance: 1,800; Referee: Artyom Kuchin

9 November 2014 10	Zhetysu	1 – 0	Irtysh	Taldykorgan
15:00 (UTC+6)	Ergashev (yellow card) 19'; K.Zotov (yellow card) 39'; R.Sariyev 65'	Summary	Bulgaru (yellow card) 14'; Džudović (yellow card) 38'	Stadium: Zhetysu Stadium; Attendance: 1,000; Referee: Aleksandr Gauzer

===== Table =====
Pos	Team	Pld	W	D	L	GF	GA	GD	Pts	Relegation
7	Tobol (Note: Tobol have had 3 point(s) deducted.)	32	10	12	10	35	35	0	26	
8	Zhetysu	32	10	8	14	21	31	−10	25	
9	Atyrau	32	10	7	15	30	43	−13	25	
10	Irtysh Pavlodar	32	9	10	13	39	44	−5	25	
11	Taraz (O)	32	9	7	16	32	45	−13	25	Qualification for the relegation play-off

Source: Soccerway (in Russian)
Rules for classification: 1st points;
Two team tiebreak: 1st overall wins; 2nd head-to-head record; 3rd goals difference; 4th goals scored; 5th away goals scored;
Multiple teams tiebreak: 1st overall wins; 2nd goals difference; 3rd goals scored; 4th away goals scored.
Team start with half number of points from first round.
(O) Play-off winners

=== Kazakhstan Cup ===
23 April 2014 First Round	Gefest	5 – 1	Zhetysu	Karagandy
17:00 (UTC+6)	E.Antonenko 46', 68'; Yegor Levin 82'; Ablakimov 85'; V.Serdiukov 90'	Report	A.Esimkhanov 77'	Stadium: Stadium Sunkar; Attendance: 500; Referee: Igor Aleshin

== Squad statistics ==
As of Match played 9 November 2014

=== Appearances and goals ===
No.	Pos	Nat	Player	Total		Premier League		Kazakhstan Cup	
No.	Pos	Nat	Player	Apps	Goals	Apps	Goals	Apps	Goals
2	DF	(Kazakhstan) KAZ	Temirlan Adilkhanov	13	0	8+5	0	0	0
4	DF	(Ivory Coast) CIV	Didier Kadio	24	0	24	0	0	0
7	FW	(Kazakhstan) KAZ	Sergei Schaff	32	4	24+8	4	0	0
9	FW	(Kazakhstan) KAZ	Beibut Tatishev	21	1	7+14	1	0	0
10	MF	(Kazakhstan) KAZ	Konstantin Zarechny	16	2	13+3	2	0	0
11	MF	(Kazakhstan) KAZ	Konstantin Zotovt	14	0	14	0	0	0
12	DF	(Kazakhstan) KAZ	Ruslan Esatov	15	1	9+6	1	0	0
19	MF	(Kazakhstan) KAZ	Taras Danilyuk	21	2	20+1	2	0	0
20	GK	(Kazakhstan) KAZ	Andrey Pasechenko	17	0	17	0	0	0
21	FW	(Bosnia and Herzegovina) BIH	Mersudin Ahmetović	16	2	6+10	2	0	0
22	MF	(Kazakhstan) KAZ	Sayat Sariyev	15	2	4+11	2	0	0
23	DF	(Kazakhstan) KAZ	Berik Shaikhov	24	1	19+5	1	0	0
24	DF	(Kazakhstan) KAZ	Viktor Kovalev	22	1	17+5	1	0	0
28	DF	(Kazakhstan) KAZ	Vladislav Kuzmin	21	0	20+1	0	0	0
29	DF	(Lithuania) LTU	Arūnas Klimavičius	25	0	25	0	0	0
33	GK	(Kazakhstan) KAZ	Vladimir Plotnikov	15	0	15	0	0	0
50	MF	(Kazakhstan) KAZ	Alisher Yesimkhanov	1	0	0+1	0	0	0
77	MF	(Serbia) SRB	Marko Putinčanin	30	0	30	0	0	0
79	FW	(Ivory Coast) CIV	Boti Goa	22	3	12+10	3	0	0
	DF	(Tajikistan) TJK	Davron Ergashev	12	0	11+1	0	0	0
	FW	(Kazakhstan) KAZ	Rauan Sariyev	25	1	21+4	1	0	0
Players who appeared for Zhetysu that left during the season:
6	MF	(Kazakhstan) KAZ	Denis Rodionov	15	1	13+2	1	0	0
17	MF	(Kazakhstan) KAZ	Abylaikhan Totay	12	0	9+3	0	0	0
86	MF	(Serbia) SRB	Marko Đalović	14	0	14	0	0	0

=== Goal scorers ===
Place	Position	Nation	Number	Name	Premier League	Kazakhstan Cup	Total
1	MF	(Kazakhstan)	7	Sergei Schaff	4	0	4
2	FW	(Ivory Coast)	79	Boti Goa	3	0	3
3	MF	(Kazakhstan)	10	Konstantin Zarechny	2	0	2
3	MF	(Kazakhstan)	22	Sayat Sariyev	2	0	2
3	FW	(Bosnia and Herzegovina)	21	Mersudin Ahmetović	2	0	2
3	MF	(Kazakhstan)	19	Taras Danilyuk	2	0	2
7	FW	(Kazakhstan)	9	Beibut Tatishev	1	0	1
7	DF	(Kazakhstan)	24	Viktor Kovalev	1	0	1
7	MF	(Kazakhstan)	6	Denis Rodionov	1	0	1
7	DF	(Kazakhstan)	12	Ruslan Esatov	1	0	1
7	MF	(Kazakhstan)	23	Berik Shaikhov	1	0	1
7	FW	(Kazakhstan)		Rauan Sariyev	1	0	1
7	MF	(Kazakhstan)	50	Alisher Yesimkhanov	0	1	1
				TOTALS	21	1	22

=== Disciplinary record ===
Number	Nation	Position	Name	Premier League		Kazakhstan Cup		Total	
Number	Nation	Position	Name	Yellow card	Red card	Yellow card	Red card	Yellow card	Red card
2	(Kazakhstan)	DF	Temirlan Adilkhanov	2	0	0	0	2	0
4	(Ivory Coast)	DF	Didier Kadio	4	0	0	0	4	0
6	(Kazakhstan)	MF	Denis Rodionov	8	1	0	0	8	1
7	(Kazakhstan)	FW	Sergei Schaff	3	0	0	0	3	0
9	(Kazakhstan)	FW	Beibut Tatishev	1	0	0	0	1	0
10	(Kazakhstan)	MF	Konstantin Zarechny	3	1	0	0	3	1
11	(Kazakhstan)	MF	Konstantin Zotov	4	0	0	0	4	0
12	(Kazakhstan)	DF	Ruslan Esatov	2	0	0	0	2	0
17	(Kazakhstan)	MF	Abylaikhan Totay	1	0	0	0	1	0
19	(Kazakhstan)	MF	Taras Danilyuk	2	1	0	0	2	1
20	(Kazakhstan)	GK	Andrey Pasechenko	2	1	0	0	2	1
21	(Bosnia and Herzegovina)	FW	Mersudin Ahmetović	2	0	0	0	2	0
22	(Kazakhstan)	MF	Sayat Sariyev	5	1	0	0	5	1
23	(Kazakhstan)	MF	Berik Shaikhov	4	0	0	0	4	0
24	(Kazakhstan)	DF	Viktor Kovalev	7	2	0	0	7	2
28	(Kazakhstan)	DF	Vladislav Kuzmin	1	0	0	0	1	0
29	(Lithuania)	DF	Arūnas Klimavičius	4	0	0	0	4	0
33	(Kazakhstan)	GK	Vladimir Plotnikov	1	0	0	0	1	0
77	(Serbia)	MF	Marko Putinčanin	6	0	0	0	6	0
79	(Ivory Coast)	FW	Boti Goa	3	0	0	0	3	0
86	(Serbia)	MF	Marko Đalović	2	1	0	0	2	1
	(Tajikistan)	DF	Davron Ergashev	5	0	0	0	5	0
	(Kazakhstan)	FW	Rauan Sariyev	2	0	0	0	2	0
			TOTALS	74	8	0	0	74	8
