= 2021 FC Ordabasy season =

FC Ordabasy
2021 season
- Chairman: Kaysar Abdraymov
- Manager: Aleksandr Sednyov
- Stadium: Kazhymukan Munaitpasov Stadium
- Premier League: 5th
- Kazakhstan Cup: Group stage
- Top goalscorer: League: João Paulo (8); All: João Paulo (8)
- Highest home attendance: 3,700 vs Aktobe (18 June 2021); 3,700 vs Atyrau (16 October 2021)
- Lowest home attendance: 0 vs Akzhayik (5 April 2021) 0 vs Astana (14 April 2021); 0 vs Kaisar (24 April 2021); 0 vs Turan (3 May 2021); 0 vs Tobol (15 May 2021) 0 vs Kyzylzhar (1 August 2021) 0 vs SDYuShOR 8 (18 August 2021) 0 vs Kyzylzhar (26 August 2021)
- Average home league attendance: 1,044 (16 October 2021)
Home colours	Away colours

The 2021 FC Ordabasy season was the 19th successive season that Ordabasy played in the Kazakhstan Premier League, the highest tier of association football in Kazakhstan.

== Season events ==
On 26 February, Ordabasy announced the signing of Bagdat Kairov from Kaisar, with Chidi Osuchukwu joining from Tom Tomsk the following day, and Temirlan Yerlanov from Tobol on 28 February. and

On 12 March, Ordabasy announced the signing of Yerkebulan Tungyshbayev from Kairat.

On 19 July, Ordabasy signed Muhammadjon Rakhimov from Istiklol.

On 4 August, Ordabasy announced the signing of Dmytro Khlyobas from Kolos Kovalivka.

== Squad ==
As of match played 30 October 2021

No.	Name	Nationality	Position	Date of birth (age)	Signed from	Signed in	Contract ends	Apps.	Goals
Goalkeepers
1	Bekkhan Shayzada	(Kazakhstan)	GK	28 February 1998 (aged 23)	Youth Team	2016		40	0
80	Timurbek Zakirov	(Kazakhstan)	GK	1 March 1996 (aged 25)	Unattached	2021		1	0
86	Vladimir Plotnikov	(Kazakhstan)	GK	3 April 1986 (aged 35)	Kairat	2020		22	0
Defenders
4	Kanat Ashirbay	(Kazakhstan)	DF	9 April 1994 (aged 27)	Kyran	2021		3	1
6	Karam Sultanov	(Kazakhstan)	DF	15 April 1996 (aged 25)	Sumgayit	2021		7	2
12	Aidos Mamirbayev	(Kazakhstan)	DF	23 December 2001 (aged 19)	Academy	2021		1	0
13	Sagadat Tursynbay	(Kazakhstan)	DF	26 March 1999 (aged 22)	Youth Team	2018		27	1
16	Rakhat Usipkhanov	(Kazakhstan)	DF	19 April 2001 (aged 20)	Academy	2021		1	0
24	Aleksandr Kleshchenko	(Russia)	DF	2 November 1995 (aged 25)	Yenisey Krasnoyarsk	2020		43	1
87	Aleksandar Simčević	(Serbia)	DF	3 March 1990 (aged 31)	Taraz	2020		125	11
Midfielders
7	Muhammadjon Rakhimov	(Tajikistan)	MF	15 October 1998 (aged 23)	Istiklol	2021		10	1
11	Maksim Vaganov	(Kazakhstan)	MF	8 August 2000 (aged 21)	Makhtaaral	2021		8	1
14	Samat Shamshi	(Kazakhstan)	MF	5 December 1996 (aged 24)	Kyran	2018		57	0
15	Erik Zharylkasyn	(Kazakhstan)	MF	23 August 2001 (aged 20)	Academy	2021		2	1
17	Sultanbek Astanov	(Kazakhstan)	MF	23 March 1999 (aged 22)	loan from Kairat	2021	2021	14	4
18	Bagdat Zhienbai	(Kazakhstan)	MF	26 October 2000 (aged 21)	Youth Team	2021		0	0
20	Elkhan Astanov	(Kazakhstan)	MF	21 May 2000 (aged 21)	Youth Team	2019		45	2
21	Yerkebulan Tungyshbayev	(Kazakhstan)	MF	14 January 1995 (aged 26)	Kairat	2021		173	26
22	Abdoulaye Diakate	(Senegal)	MF	16 January 1988 (aged 33)	Atyrau	2016		207	28
23	Chidi Osuchukwu	(Nigeria)	MF	11 August 1993 (aged 28)	Tom Tomsk	2021		22	0
25	Zikrillo Sultaniyazov	(Kazakhstan)	MF	15 October 2003 (aged 18)	Youth Team	2021		4	0
27	Timur Dosmagambetov	(Kazakhstan)	MF	1 May 1989 (aged 32)	Okzhetpes	2018		106	6
28	Asludin Khadzhiev	(Kazakhstan)	MF	24 October 2000 (aged 21)	Youth Team	2019		29	1
30	Zhavlanbek Babanazarov	(Kazakhstan)	MF	12 February 2001 (aged 20)	Academy	2021		3	0
72	Batyrkhan Tazhibay	(Kazakhstan)	MF	7 August 2001 (aged 20)	Academy	2021		10	1
77	Shadman Bakirov	(Kazakhstan)	MF	23 July 2001 (aged 20)	Academy	2021		1	0
78	Murodzhon Khalmatov	(Kazakhstan)	MF	20 July 2003 (aged 18)	Kairat Academy	2021		5	0
Forwards
9	Toktar Zhangylyshbay	(Kazakhstan)	FW	25 May 1993 (aged 28)	Tobol	2019		62	9
18	Bagdat Zhienbay	(Kazakhstan)	FW	26 October 2000 (aged 21)	Academy	2021		1	0
19	Madizhan Aytbaev	(Kazakhstan)	FW	18 February 1997 (aged 24)	Youth Team	2020		0	0
91	Sergei Khizhnichenko	(Kazakhstan)	FW	17 July 1991 (aged 30)	Astana	2020		52	8
94	Dmytro Khlyobas	(Ukraine)	FW	9 May 1994 (aged 27)	Kolos Kovalivka	2021		8	1
Players away on loan
Players that left during the season
5	Damir Dautov	(Kazakhstan)	DF	3 March 1990 (aged 31)	Irtysh Pavlodar	2018		45	0
7	May Mahlangu	(South Africa)	MF	1 May 1989 (aged 32)	Ludogorets Razgrad	2020		58	4
8	Temirlan Yerlanov	(Kazakhstan)	DF	9 July 1993 (aged 28)	Tobol	2021		98	11
10	Mirzad Mehanović	(Bosnia and Herzegovina)	MF	5 January 1993 (aged 28)	Fastav Zlín	2020		78	8
11	Rúben Brígido	(Portugal)	MF	23 June 1991 (aged 30)	Beroe Stara Zagora	2020		38	4
17	Bagdat Kairov	(Kazakhstan)	DF	27 April 1993 (aged 28)	Kaisar	2021		14	1
29	Pablo Fontanello	(Argentina)	DF	25 February 1984 (aged 37)	Ural Yekaterinburg	2017		139	5
37	João Paulo	(Brazil)	FW	2 June 1988 (aged 33)	Ludogorets Razgrad	2020		72	35
42	Igor Trofimets	(Kazakhstan)	GK	20 August 1996 (aged 25)	Aktobe	2020		0	0

== Transfers ==
=== In ===
Date	Position	Nationality	Name	From	Fee	Ref.
26 February 2021	DF	(Kazakhstan)	Bagdat Kairov	Kaisar	Undisclosed	
27 February 2021	MF	(Nigeria)	Chidi Osuchukwu	Tom Tomsk	Undisclosed	
28 February 2021	DF	(Kazakhstan)	Temirlan Yerlanov	Tobol	Free	
12 March 2021	MF	(Kazakhstan)	Yerkebulan Tungyshbayev	Kairat	Undisclosed	
9 July 2021	DF	(Kazakhstan)	Kanat Ashirbay	Kyran	Undisclosed	
19 July 2021	MF	(Tajikistan)	Muhammadjon Rakhimov	Istiklol	Undisclosed	
28 July 2021	DF	(Kazakhstan)	Karam Sultanov	Unattached	Free	
30 July 2021	GK	(Kazakhstan)	Timurbek Zakirov	Unattached	Free	
4 August 2021	FW	(Ukraine)	Dmytro Khlyobas	Kolos Kovalivka	Undisclosed	

=== Loans in ===
Date from	Position	Nationality	Name	From	Date to	Ref.
10 July 2021	MF	(Kazakhstan)	Sultanbek Astanov	Kairat	End of season	

=== Released ===
Date	Position	Nationality	Name	Joined	Date	Ref.
8 May 2021	DF	(Kazakhstan)	Damir Dautov	Zhetysu	8 May 2021	
30 June 2021	MF	(South Africa)	May Mahlangu	Aksu	23 April 2022	
30 June 2021	DF	(Kazakhstan)	Bagdat Kairov	Tobol	1 July 2021	
30 June 2021	MF	(Kazakhstan)	Timur Dosmagambetov	Taraz	8 July 2021	
30 June 2021	MF	(Portugal)	Rúben Brígido	Tobol	2 July 2021	
30 June 2021	FW	(Brazil)	João Paulo	Kairat	6 July 2021	
30 June 2021	GK	(Kazakhstan)	Igor Trofimets	Shakhter Karagandy	9 July 2021	
12 July 2021	MF	(Bosnia and Herzegovina)	Mirzad Mehanović	Tuzla City	21 July 2021	
14 July 2021	DF	(Kazakhstan)	Temirlan Yerlanov	Aktobe	14 July 2021	
4 August 2021	DF	(Argentina)	Pablo Fontanello	Torrijos	4 August 2021	

== Competitions ==
=== Overview ===
Competition	First match	Last match	Starting round	Record							
Competition	First match	Last match	Starting round	Pld	W	D	L	GF	GA	GD	Win %
Premier League	14 March 2021	30 October 2021	Matchday 1	26	10	8	8	36	35	+1	38.46
Kazakhstan Cup	11 July 2021	18 August 2021	Group stage	6	3	1	2	14	7	+7	50.00
Total				32	13	9	10	50	42	+8	40.63

Last updated: 30 October 2021
Source: Competitions

=== Premier League ===
==== Results summary ====
Overall								Home						Away					
Pld	W	D	L	GF	GA	GD	Pts	W	D	L	GF	GA	GD	W	D	L	GF	GA	GD
26	10	8	8	36	33	+3	38	5	4	4	17	19	−2	5	4	4	19	14	+5

Last updated: 30 October 2021.
Source: See Results

==== Results by round ====
Round	1	2	3	4	5	6	7	8	9	10	11	12	13	14	15	16	17	18	19	20	21	22	23	24	25	26
Ground	A	H	A	H	A	H	A	H	A	H	A	H	H	A	H	A	H	A	H	H	A	H	A	H	A	A
Result	W	W	D	L	W	W	L	L	D	D	D	D	D	W	L	W	W	L	L	W	D	D	L	W	W	L
Position	5	2	5	6	5	4	6	6	7	7	7	9	9	6	7	5	5	5	6	5	5	5	5	5	4	5

Source: See Results
A = Away; H = Home; W = Win; D = Draw; L = Loss

==== Results ====
20 March 2021 2	Shakhter Karagandy	0 – 2	Ordabasy	Nur-Sultan
16:00 (UTC+6)	Baah (yellow card) 14'; Udo (yellow card) 19'; Pavlov (yellow card) 26'; Buyvolov (yellow card) 49'; Mitošević (yellow card) 60'	Report	Simčević 50'; João Paulo (yellow card) 82'; Khizhnichenko 88'	Stadium: Astana Arena; Attendance: 0 Referee: Denis Izmailov
Note: Match played at the Astana Arena in Nur-Sultan instead of Shakhter's regular Shakhter Stadium in Karaganda. Match played behind closed doors due to the COVID-19 pandemic in Kazakhstan.

5 April 2021 3	Ordabasy	2 – 1	Akzhayik	Shymkent
17:00 (UTC+6)	S.Shamshi (yellow card) 76'; João Paulo 90+3' (pen.); Tungyshbayev 90+6'	Report	Fontanello 51' (o.g.); Shustikov (yellow card) 63'; Michurenkov (yellow card) 85'; B.Omarov (yellow card) 90+3'	Stadium: Kazhymukan Munaitpasov Stadium; Attendance: 0 Referee: Sergey Nozhenko
Note: Match played behind closed doors due to the COVID-19 pandemic in Kazakhstan.

9 April 2021 4	Aktobe	4 – 4	Ordabasy	Aktobe
19:00 (UTC+6)	Doumbia (yellow card) 24'; Sergeev 27'; R.Temirkhan (yellow card) 33'; Nurgaliyev 43'; Totadze (yellow card) 74'; R.Nurmugamet 86'; Jeřábek 90+4'	Report	Yerlanov 12'; João Paulo 36', 74' (pen.); S.Shamshi (yellow card) 39'; Khizhnichenko 90+1'	Stadium: Central Stadium; Attendance: 0 Referee: Sergey Gorokhovodatsky
Note: Match played behind closed doors due to the COVID-19 pandemic in Kazakhstan.

14 April 2021 5	Ordabasy	1 – 4	Astana	Shymkent
15:00 (UTC+6)	Tungyshbayev 22'; Dosmagambetov (yellow card) 48'; Simčević (yellow card) 51'; B.Kairov (yellow card) 80'	Report	Aimbetov 19', 60'; Ciupercă (yellow card) 26'; Tomasov (yellow card) 36' (goal) 78'; Barseghyan 53' (pen.); Nepohodov (yellow card) 87'	Stadium: Kazhymukan Munaitpasov Stadium; Attendance: 0 Referee: Igor Chesnokov
Note: Match played behind closed doors due to the COVID-19 pandemic in Kazakhstan.

19 April 2021 6	Zhetysu	0 – 4	Ordabasy	Taldıqorğan
15:00 (UTC+6)	Orynbasar (yellow card) 45'	Report	Simčević 27'; Astanov 57'; João Paulo 60'; Z.Sultaniyazov (yellow card) 85'; Mehanović 90+4' (pen.)	Stadium: Zhetysu Stadium; Attendance: 0 Referee: Grigory Moskovchenko
Note: Match played behind closed doors due to the COVID-19 pandemic in Kazakhstan.

24 April 2021 7	Ordabasy	4 – 2	Kaisar	Shymkent
17:00 (UTC+6)	Simčević (yellow card) 14'; João Paulo 21', 63'; Dosmagambetov 61'; Brígido 88'	Report	Laukžemis 25', 36' (yellow card) 41'; Rudoselskiy (yellow card) 50'	Stadium: Kazhymukan Munaitpasov Stadium; Attendance: 0 Referee: Rustam Omarov
Note: Match played behind closed doors due to the COVID-19 pandemic in Kazakhstan.

29 April 2021 8	Kairat	3 – 0	Ordabasy	Almaty
19:00 (UTC+6)	S.Keyler (yellow card) 6'; Vágner Love (yellow card) 24' (yellow-red card) 24'; Eseola 61'; Abiken (yellow card) 65'; Pokatilov (yellow card) 85'; Mamba 88'; Kanté 90+4'	Report	Tungyshbayev 13'; Astanov 45'	Stadium: Central Stadium; Attendance: 0 Referee: Artem Kuchin
Note: Match played behind closed doors due to the COVID-19 pandemic in Kazakhstan.

3 May 2021 9	Ordabasy	0 – 1	Turan	Shymkent
18:00 (UTC+6)	Simčević (yellow card) 28'; B.Kairov (red card) 79'	Report	Kerimzhanov (yellow card) 17'; B.Beysenov (yellow card) 22'; T.Amirov 30'; A.Mukhamed (yellow card) 59'	Stadium: Kazhymukan Munaitpasov Stadium; Attendance: 0 Referee: Aidyn Rakhimbaev
Note: Match played behind closed doors due to the COVID-19 pandemic in Kazakhstan.

8 May 2021 10	Caspiy	0 – 0	Ordabasy	Aktau
18:00 (UTC+6)	Bukorac (yellow card) 71'	Report	Yerlanov (yellow card) 32'; Kleshchenko (yellow card) 72'	Stadium: Zhastar Stadium; Attendance: 950; Referee: Sergei Nozhenko

15 May 2021 11	Ordabasy	1 – 1	Tobol	Shymkent
17:00 (UTC+6)	Yerlanov (yellow card) 36'; Dosmagambetov (yellow card) 42'; Kleshchenko (red card) 80'; Tungyshbayev 87'	Report	Nurgaliev (yellow card) 40'; Malyi (yellow card) 49'; Jovančić (yellow card) 54'; Tagybergen (yellow card) 62'; S.Zharynbetov 67'	Stadium: Kazhymukan Munaitpasov Stadium; Attendance: 0 Referee: Igor Chesnokov
Note: Match played behind closed doors due to the COVID-19 pandemic in Kazakhstan.

19 May 2021 12	Atyrau	0 – 0	Ordabasy	Atyrau
20:00 (UTC+6)	Guz (yellow card) 40'; Grzelczak (yellow card) 45+1'; Shkodra (penalty missed) 61'; Gian (yellow card) 65'	Report		Stadium: Munaishy Stadium; Attendance: 1,200; Referee: Grigory Moskovchenko

24 May 2021 13	Ordabasy	1 – 1	Taraz	Shymkent
18:00 (UTC+6)	Fontanello (yellow card) 65'; Tungyshbayev 83'	Report	B.Shaykhov (yellow card) 62'; Kódjo (yellow card) 70'; Akhmetov 77'; A.Sapargaliyev (yellow card) 85'	Stadium: Kazhymukan Munaitpasov Stadium; Attendance: 2,500; Referee: Denis Tevyashov

29 May 2021 14	Ordabasy	0 – 0	Shakhter Karagandy	Shymkent
18:00 (UTC+6)	João Paulo (penalty missed) 58'	Report	Bakayev (yellow card) 57'; T.Nurseitov (yellow card) 60'; Gapon (yellow card) 87'	Stadium: Kazhymukan Munaitpasov Stadium; Attendance: 1,500; Referee: Alexander Gauzer

12 June 2021 15	Akzhayik	0 – 1	Ordabasy	Oral
20:00 (UTC+6)	E.Tapalov (yellow card) 32'; Chychykov (yellow card) 64'; Kovtalyuk (yellow card) 87'	Report	Diakate (yellow card) 42'; João Paulo (yellow card) 76' (goal) 90+2'	Stadium: Petr Atoyan Stadium; Attendance: 1,600; Referee: Sergey Gorokhovodatsky

18 June 2021 16	Ordabasy	0 – 1	Aktobe	Shymkent
21:00 (UTC+6)	Osuchukwu (yellow card) 26'; Dosmagambetov (yellow card) 40'; Diakate (yellow card) 69'	Report	Jeřábek (yellow card) 48'; Pertsukh (yellow card) 75'; Logvinenko 81'	Stadium: Kazhymukan Munaitpasov Stadium; Attendance: 3,700; Referee: Artem Kuchin

22 June 2021 17	Astana	0 – 2	Ordabasy	Nur-Sultan
19:00 (UTC+6)	Haroyan (yellow card) 26'	Report	B.Kairov 22' (yellow card) 77'; João Paulo 24'; Fontanello (yellow card) 40'; Kleshchenko (yellow card) 56'; Astanov (yellow card) 82'; B.Shayzada (yellow card) 90+2'	Stadium: Astana Arena; Attendance: 1,500; Referee: Denis Izmailov

27 June 2021 18	Ordabasy	3 – 0	Zhetysu	Shymkent
20:00 (UTC+6)	Khizhnichenko 13'; Mehanović 44', 67' Diakate (yellow card) 62'	Report	Poyarkov (yellow card) 48'	Stadium: Kazhymukan Munaitpasov Stadium; Attendance: 2,000; Referee: Aydin Rakhimbaev

3 July 2021 19	Kaisar	1 – 0	Ordabasy	Kyzylorda
21:00 (UTC+6)	Potapov (yellow card) 22'; Bayzhanov 42'; Narzildayev (yellow card) 84'	Report	Diakate (yellow card) 86'	Stadium: Gani Muratbayev Stadium; Attendance: 0 Referee: Artem Kuchin
Note: Match played behind closed doors due to the COVID-19 pandemic in Kazakhstan.

26 August 2021 1	Ordabasy	0 – 5	Kyzylzhar	Shymkent
18:00 (UTC+6)	Rakhimov (yellow card) 19' (yellow-red card) 21'; E.Astanov (yellow card) 23'; Sultanov (yellow card) 45+2'; Simčević (yellow card) 60'	Report	Bushman 2'; Karshakevich 9'; A.Saparov (yellow card) 57'; Zorić 58'; Simčević 62' (o.g.); Yakovlev 80'	Stadium: Kazhymukan Munaitpasov Stadium; Attendance: 0 Referee: Artem Kuchin
Note: Match originally scheduled for 14 March, but postponed the same day due to bad weather. Match played behind closed doors due to the COVID-19 pandemic in Kazakhstan.

12 September 2021 20	Ordabasy	2 – 1	Kairat	Shymkent
19:00 (UTC+6)	Diakate 10'; Kleshchenko 31'; S.Shamshi (yellow card) 81'	Report	Abiken (red card) 36'; Kanté 73' (yellow card) 79'	Stadium: Kazhymukan Munaitpasov Stadium; Attendance: 1,500; Referee: Denis Tevyashov

18 September 2021 21	Turan	1 – 1	Ordabasy	Turkistan
20:00 (UTC+6)	Fazli (yellow card) 15'; Kerimzhanov (yellow card) 23'; Živković 35' (pen.) (penalty missed) 66'; Chizh (yellow card) 57'; Musabekov (yellow card) 70'; Stanley (yellow card) 79'	Report	Simčević (yellow card) 34'; Diakate (yellow card) 65'; Rakhimov (yellow card) 74' (goal) 90+4'	Stadium: Turkistan Arena; Attendance: 1,200; Referee: Sayat Karabayev

27 September 2021 22	Ordabasy	1 – 1	Caspiy	Shymkent
19:00 (UTC+6)	Khlyobas 28'; S.Astanov (yellow card) 49'	Report	Darabayev 32' (yellow card) 74'; B.Kabylan (yellow card) 39'; Mingazow (yellow card) 79'	Stadium: Kazhymukan Munaitpasov Stadium; Attendance: 800; Referee: Daniyar Sakhi

2 October 2021 23	Tobol	3 – 1	Ordabasy	Kostanay
17:00 (UTC+6)	Jovančić (yellow card) 6'; Sergeyev 25'; Nurgaliyev (yellow card) 52'; Tošić 74'; R.Asrankulov 86'	Report	S.Astanov 30'; S.Tursynbay (yellow card) 31'; S.Shamshi (yellow card) 62'; Kleshchenko (yellow card) 77'	Stadium: Central Stadium; Attendance: 1,000; Referee: Denis Izmailov

16 October 2021 24	Ordabasy	2 – 1	Atyrau	Shymkent
19:00 (UTC+6)	S.Tursynbay (yellow card) 43'; Astanov 56'; Diakate 73'	Report	R.Ospanov (yellow card) 33'; Allef 47'; Dashyan (yellow card) 69'; Gian (yellow card) 83'; Alex Bruno (yellow card) 90+2'	Stadium: Kazhymukan Munaitpasov Stadium; Attendance: Denis Tevyashov; Referee: 3,700

24 October 2021 25	Taraz	1 – 2	Ordabasy	Taraz
15:00 (UTC+6)	A.Nusip 77'	Report	Diakate 27'; Sultanov 33' (yellow card) 69'	Stadium: Central Stadium; Attendance: 3,000; Referee: Alexander Gauser

30 October 2021 26	Kyzylzhar	3 – 2	Ordabasy	Petropavl
14:00 (UTC+6)	Drachenko 10' (yellow card) 53'; Fonseca 46'; Yakovlev (yellow card) 65'; Podio 90+2'	Report	Simčević (yellow card) 10' (goal) 89'; Sultanov 74'	Stadium: Karasai Stadium; Attendance: 2,000; Referee: Daniyar Sakhi

==== League table ====
Pos	Team	Pld	W	D	L	GF	GA	GD	Pts	Qualification or relegation
3	Kairat	26	14	9	3	52	21	+31	51	Qualification for the Europa Conference League second qualifying round
4	Kyzylzhar	26	11	6	9	32	24	+8	39	Qualification for the Europa Conference League second qualifying round
5	Ordabasy	26	10	8	8	36	35	+1	38	
6	Shakhter Karagandy	26	9	6	11	25	34	−9	33	
7	Aktobe	26	9	6	11	35	40	−5	33	

Source: UEFA, Soccerway
Rules for classification: 1) Points; 2) Goal difference; 3) Matches won; 4) Goals scored; 5) Away goals scored; 6) Head-to-head points; 7) Head-to-head matches won; 8) Head-to-head goal difference; 9) Head-to-head goals scored; 10) Head-to-head away goals scored; 11) Draw.

=== Kazakhstan Cup ===
==== Group stage ====
Pos	Team	Pld	W	D	L	GF	GA	GD	Pts	Qualification
1	Shakhter Karagandy (A)	6	4	0	2	18	14	+4	12	Advanced to Quarterfinals
2	Kyzylzhar (A)	6	3	2	1	16	8	+8	11	Advanced to Quarterfinals
3	Ordabasy	6	3	1	2	14	7	+7	10	
4	SDYuShOR 8	6	0	1	5	6	25	−19	1	

Updated to match(es) played on 18 August 2021. Source: PFLK
(A) Advance to a further round

11 July 2021 1	Ordabasy	1 – 0	Shakhter Karagandy	Shymkent
21:00 (UTC+6)	Diakate 90' (pen.)	Report	I.Sviridov (yellow card) 52'; E.Alishauskas (yellow card) 84'; Chochiyev (yellow card) 88'	Stadium: Kazhymukan Munaitpasov Stadium; Attendance: 1,000; Referee: Anton Kuchma

18 July 2021 2	SDYuShOR 8	1 – 3	Ordabasy	Nur-Sultan
19:00 (UTC+6)	O.Saylybayev (yellow card) 25'; A.Dadakhanov (yellow card) 54'; E.Nabiev 77' (pen.)	Report	S.Astanov 6', 28'; Khizhnichenko 64'	Stadium: Astana Arena; Attendance: 0 Referee: Maxim Bogdanov
Note: Match played behind closed doors due to the COVID-19 pandemic in Kazakhstan. Match played at the Astana Arena in Nur-Sultan instead of regular BIIK Stadium in Shymkent.

24 July 2021 3	Kyzylzhar	1 – 1	Ordabasy	Petropavl
18:00 (UTC+6)	Zorić 43'; Fonseca (yellow card) 59'	Report	S.Astanov 17'; Kleshchenko (yellow card) 45'; E.Astanov (yellow card) 83'	Stadium: Karasai Stadium; Attendance: 1,000; Referee: Bulat Sariev

1 August 2021 4	Ordabasy	0 – 1	Kyzylzhar	Shymkent
21:00 (UTC+6)	B.Shayzada (red card) 2'; Osuchukwu (yellow card) 39'; Z.Babanazarov (yellow card) 82'; Diakate (yellow card) 87'	Report	Bushman (yellow card) 39' (goal) 75'; Koné (yellow card) 56'; T.Muldinov (yellow card) 80'	Stadium: Kazhymukan Munaitpasov Stadium; Attendance: 0 Referee: Igor Chesnokov
Note: Match played behind closed doors due to the COVID-19 pandemic in Kazakhstan.

14 August 2021 5	Shakhter Karagandy	3 – 2	Ordabasy	Karaganda
19:00 (UTC+6)	A.Nazimkhanov 12'; A.Tattybaev 38', 45'; T.Nurseitov (yellow card) 40'; Umayev (yellow card) 90+2'; Mawutor (yellow card) 90+3'	Report	A.Khadzhiev (yellow card) 25'; Simčević 56' (yellow card) 90+3'; S.Tursynbay (yellow card) 68'; Graf 90' (o.g.)	Stadium: Shakhter Stadium; Attendance: 0 Referee: Alexander Zatula
Note: Match played behind closed doors due to the COVID-19 pandemic in Kazakhstan.

18 August 2021 6	Ordabasy	7 – 1	SDYuShOR 8	Shymkent
20:00 (UTC+6)	K.Ashirbay 3'; S.Tursynbay (yellow card) 47' (goal) 55'; B.Tazhibay 58'; Khizhnichenko 62'; A.Hadzhiev 73'; M.Vaganov 77'; E.Zharylkasyn 85'	Report	A.Ismailov (yellow card) 50'; A.Tuleev 82'	Stadium: Kazhymukan Munaitpasov Stadium; Attendance: 0 Referee: Anton Moltusinov
Note: Match played behind closed doors due to the COVID-19 pandemic in Kazakhstan.

== Squad statistics ==
As of match played 30 October 2021

=== Appearances and goals ===
No.	Pos	Nat	Player	Total		Premier League		Kazakhstan Cup	
No.	Pos	Nat	Player	Apps	Goals	Apps	Goals	Apps	Goals
1	GK	(Kazakhstan) KAZ	Bekkhan Shayzada	22	0	20	0	2	0
4	DF	(Kazakhstan) KAZ	Kanat Ashirbay	3	1	1	0	2	1
6	DF	(Kazakhstan) KAZ	Karam Sultanov	7	2	5+1	2	1	0
7	MF	(Tajikistan) TJK	Muhammadjon Rakhimov	10	1	5+2	1	3	0
11	MF	(Kazakhstan) KAZ	Maksim Vaganov	8	1	0+4	0	0+4	1
12	DF	(Kazakhstan) KAZ	Aidos Mamirbayev	1	0	0	0	0+1	0
13	DF	(Kazakhstan) KAZ	Sagadat Tursynbay	27	1	11+10	0	6	1
14	MF	(Kazakhstan) KAZ	Samat Shamshi	16	0	8+3	0	3+2	0
15	MF	(Kazakhstan) KAZ	Erik Zharylkasyn	2	1	0+1	0	0+1	1
16	DF	(Kazakhstan) KAZ	Rakhat Usipkhanov	1	0	0	0	1	0
17	MF	(Kazakhstan) KAZ	Sultanbek Astanov	14	4	8	1	6	3
18	FW	(Kazakhstan) KAZ	Bagdat Zhienbay	1	0	0	0	0+1	0
20	MF	(Kazakhstan) KAZ	Elkhan Astanov	30	2	17+7	2	6	0
21	MF	(Kazakhstan) KAZ	Yerkebulan Tungyshbayev	19	4	15+4	4	0	0
22	MF	(Senegal) SEN	Abdoulaye Diakate	20	4	15+1	3	4	1
23	MF	(Nigeria) NGR	Chidi Osuchukwu	22	0	18	0	4	0
24	DF	(Russia) RUS	Aleksandr Kleshchenko	28	1	22	1	6	0
25	MF	(Kazakhstan) KAZ	Zikrillo Sultaniyazov	4	0	0+3	0	1	0
27	MF	(Kazakhstan) KAZ	Timur Dosmagambetov	17	1	15+2	1	0	0
28	MF	(Kazakhstan) KAZ	Asludin Khadzhiev	14	1	0+9	0	1+4	1
30	MF	(Kazakhstan) KAZ	Zhavlanbek Babanazarov	3	0	0+1	0	0+2	0
72	MF	(Kazakhstan) KAZ	Batyrkhan Tazhibay	10	1	0+5	0	1+4	1
77	MF	(Kazakhstan) KAZ	Shadman Bakirov	1	0	0	0	0+1	0
80	GK	(Kazakhstan) KAZ	Timurbek Zakirov	1	0	1	0	0	0
86	GK	(Kazakhstan) KAZ	Vladimir Plotnikov	10	0	5	0	4+1	0
87	DF	(Serbia) SRB	Aleksandar Simčević	28	4	22+2	3	4	1
91	FW	(Kazakhstan) KAZ	Sergei Khizhnichenko	28	5	8+14	3	5+1	2
94	FW	(Ukraine) UKR	Dmytro Khlyobas	8	1	8	1	0	0
Players away from Ordabasy on loan:
Players who left Ordabasy during the season:
5	DF	(Kazakhstan) KAZ	Damir Dautov	5	0	1+4	0	0	0
7	MF	(South Africa) RSA	May Mahlangu	3	0	1+2	0	0	0
8	DF	(Kazakhstan) KAZ	Temirlan Yerlanov	17	1	16	1	1	0
10	MF	(Bosnia and Herzegovina) BIH	Mirzad Mehanović	17	2	10+7	2	0	0
11	MF	(Portugal) POR	Rúben Brígido	17	1	14+3	1	0	0
17	DF	(Kazakhstan) KAZ	Bagdat Kairov	14	1	12+2	1	0	0
29	DF	(Argentina) ARG	Pablo Fontanello	19	0	15+1	0	3	0
37	FW	(Brazil) BRA	João Paulo	14	8	14	8	0	0
80	MF	(Kazakhstan) KAZ	Murodzhon Khalmatov	5	0	0+2	0	2+1	0

=== Goal scorers ===
Place	Position	Nation	Number	Name	Premier League	Kazakhstan Cup	Total
1	FW	(Brazil)	37	João Paulo	8	0	8
2	FW	(Kazakhstan)	91	Sergei Khizhnichenko	3	2	5
3	MF	(Kazakhstan)	21	Yerkebulan Tungyshbayev	4	0	4
3	MF	(Senegal)	22	Abdoulaye Diakate	3	1	4
3	DF	(Serbia)	87	Aleksandar Simčević	3	1	4
3	MF	(Kazakhstan)	17	Sultanbek Astanov	1	3	4
7	MF	(Bosnia and Herzegovina)	10	Mirzad Mehanović	3	0	3
8	MF	(Kazakhstan)	20	Elkhan Astanov	2	0	2
8	DF	(Kazakhstan)	6	Karam Sultanov	2	0	2
10	DF	(Kazakhstan)	8	Temirlan Yerlanov	1	0	1
10	MF	(Kazakhstan)	27	Timur Dosmagambetov	1	0	1
10	MF	(Portugal)	11	Rúben Brígido	1	0	1
10	DF	(Kazakhstan)	17	Bagdat Kairov	1	0	1
10	DF	(Russia)	24	Aleksandr Kleshchenko	1	0	1
10	MF	(Tajikistan)	7	Muhammadjon Rakhimov	1	0	1
10	FW	(Ukraine)	94	Dmytro Khlyobas	1	0	1
10	DF	(Kazakhstan)	4	Kanat Ashirbay	0	1	1
10	DF	(Kazakhstan)	13	Sagadat Tursynbay	0	1	1
10	MF	(Kazakhstan)	72	Batyrkhan Tazhibay	0	1	1
10	MF	(Kazakhstan)	28	Asludin Khadzhiev	0	1	1
10	MF	(Kazakhstan)	11	Maksim Vaganov	0	1	1
10	MF	(Kazakhstan)	15	Erik Zharylkasyn	0	1	1
10				Own goal	0	1	1
				TOTALS	36	14	50

=== Clean sheets ===
Place	Position	Nation	Number	Name	Premier League	Kazakhstan Cup	Total
1	GK	(Kazakhstan)	1	Bekkhan Shayzada	6	0	6
2	GK	(Kazakhstan)	86	Vladimir Plotnikov	2	1	3
				TOTALS	8	1	9

=== Disciplinary record ===
Number	Nation	Position	Name	Premier League		Kazakhstan Cup		Total	
Number	Nation	Position	Name	Booked	Sent off (straight red)	Booked	Sent off (straight red)	Booked	Sent off (straight red)
1	(Kazakhstan)	GK	Bekkhan Shayzada	1	0	0	1	1	1
6	(Kazakhstan)	DF	Karam Sultanov	2	0	0	0	2	0
7	(Tajikistan)	MF	Muhammadjon Rakhimov	3	1	0	0	3	1
13	(Kazakhstan)	DF	Sagadat Tursynbay	2	0	2	0	4	0
14	(Kazakhstan)	MF	Samat Shamshi	4	0	0	0	4	0
17	(Kazakhstan)	MF	Sultanbek Astanov	1	0	0	0	1	0
20	(Kazakhstan)	MF	Elkhan Astanov	3	0	1	0	4	0
21	(Kazakhstan)	MF	Yerkebulan Tungyshbayev	1	0	0	0	1	0
22	(Senegal)	MF	Abdoulaye Diakate	5	0	1	0	6	0
23	(Nigeria)	MF	Chidi Osuchukwu	1	0	1	0	2	0
24	(Russia)	DF	Aleksandr Kleshchenko	3	1	1	0	4	1
25	(Kazakhstan)	MF	Zikrillo Sultaniyazov	1	0	0	0	1	0
27	(Kazakhstan)	MF	Timur Dosmagambetov	3	0	0	0	3	0
28	(Kazakhstan)	MF	Asludin Khadzhiev	0	0	1	0	1	0
30	(Kazakhstan)	MF	Zhavlanbek Babanazarov	0	0	1	0	1	0
87	(Serbia)	DF	Aleksandar Simčević	6	0	1	0	7	0
Players who left Ordabasy during the season:
8	(Kazakhstan)	DF	Temirlan Yerlanov	2	0	0	0	2	0
17	(Kazakhstan)	DF	Bagdat Kairov	2	1	0	0	2	1
29	(Argentina)	DF	Pablo Fontanello	2	0	0	0	2	0
37	(Brazil)	FW	João Paulo	2	0	0	0	2	0
			TOTALS	45	3	9	1	54	4
