= Vladimir Plotnikov (footballer) =

Kazakhstani footballer

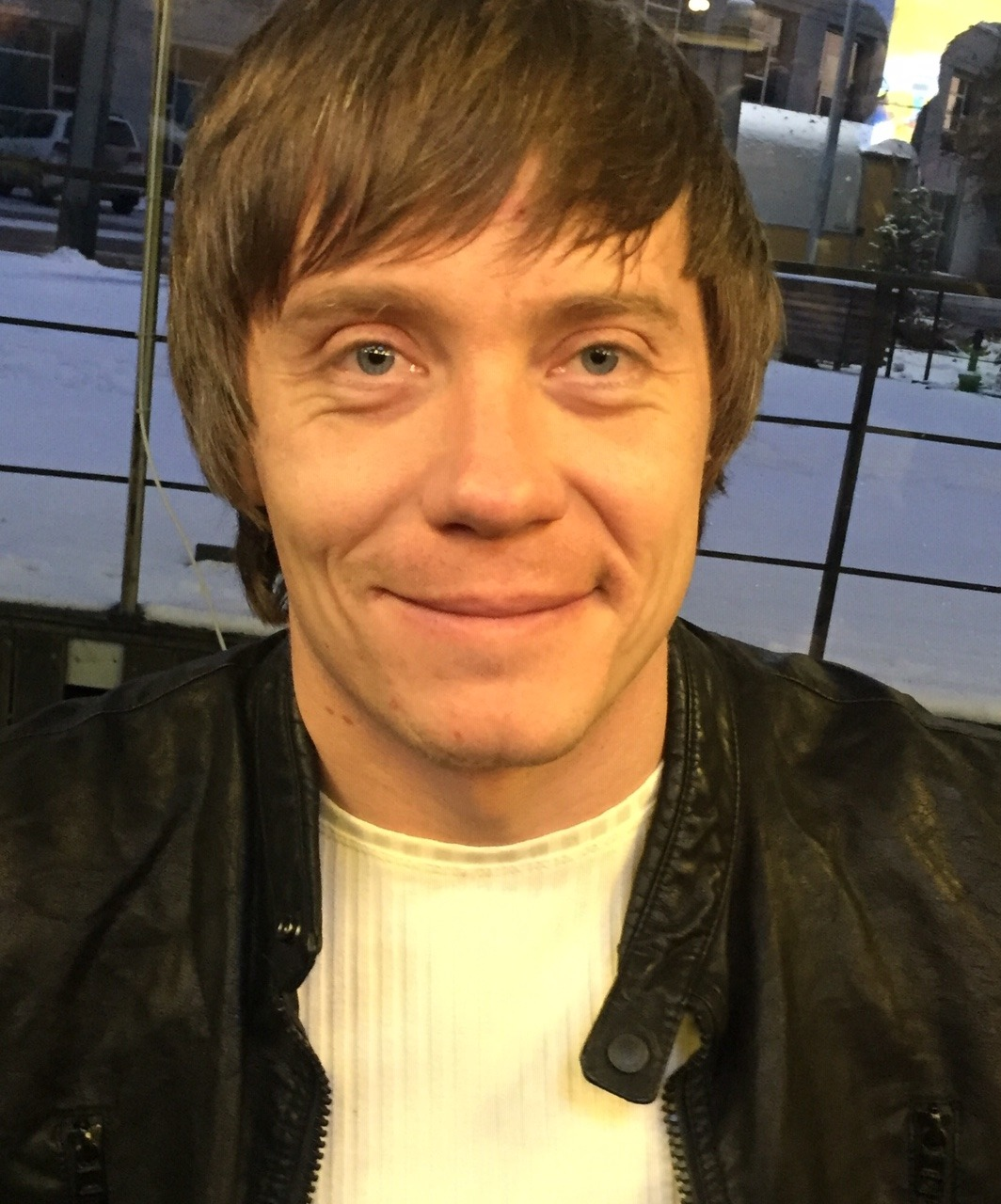

Personal information
- Full name: Vladimir Aleksandrovich Plotnikov
- Date of birth: 3 April 1986 (age 40)
- Place of birth: Almaty, Kazakhstan
- Height: 1.91 m (6 ft 3 in)
- Position: Goalkeeper

Senior career*
Years	Team	Apps	(Gls)
2006–2008	Taraz	18	(0)
2009	Kairat	0	(0)
2010–2011	Alma-Ata	56	(0)
2012–2013	Atyrau	7	(0)
2014	Zhetysu	15	(0)
2015–2019	Kairat	77	(0)
2020–2021	Ordabasy	17	(0)

International career^{‡}
2016–	Kazakhstan	1	(0)
- * Club domestic league appearances and goals as of 1 April 2022 ‡ National team caps and goals as of 16 July 2016

Vladimir Aleksandrovich Plotnikov (Russian: Владимир Александрович Плотников; born 3 April 1986) is a Kazakhstani professional footballer who last played for FC Ordabasy, and the Kazakhstan national team.

== Club career ==
Plotnikov started his club career in FC Taraz in 2006. Prior to joining FC Kairat in January 2015, he played for FC Taraz, FC Kairat, FC Alma-Ata, FC Atyrau and FC Zhetysu.

On 24 November 2017, Kairat announced that Plotnikov had extended his contract with the club until the end of 2020.

On 11 February 2020, FC Ordabasy announced the signing of Plotnikov from FC Kairat.

== International career ==
On 29 March 2016, Plotnikov debuted for Kazakhstan in a friendly match against Georgia.

== Career statistics ==
=== Club ===
As of match played 7 March 2020

Appearances and goals by club, season and competition
Club	Season	League			National Cup		Continental		Other		Total	
Club	Season	Division	Apps	Goals	Apps	Goals	Apps	Goals	Apps	Goals	Apps	Goals
Atyrau	2012	Kazakhstan Premier League	2	0	0	0	-		-		2	0
Atyrau	2013	Kazakhstan Premier League	5	0	0	0	-		-		5	0
Atyrau	Total		7	0	0	0	-	-	-	-	7	0
Zhetysu	2014	Kazakhstan Premier League	15	0	0	0	–		–		15	0
Kairat	2015	Kazakhstan Premier League	29	0	4	0	8	0	1	0	42	0
Kairat	2016	Kazakhstan Premier League	24	0	2	0	4	0	1	0	31	0
Kairat	2017	Kazakhstan Premier League	15	0	3	0	2	0	1	0	21	0
Kairat	2018	Kazakhstan Premier League	6	0	2	0	5	0	1	0	14	0
Kairat	2019	Kazakhstan Premier League	3	0	2	0	0	0	0	0	5	0
Kairat	Total		77	0	13	0	19	0	4	0	113	0
Ordabasy	2020	Kazakhstan Premier League	12	0	0	0	0	0	–		12	0
Ordabasy	2021	Kazakhstan Premier League	5	0	5	0	–		–		10	0
Ordabasy	Total		17	0	5	0	-	-	-	-	22	0
Career total			116	0	18	0	19	0	4	0	157	0

=== International ===
Kazakhstan national team
Year	Apps	Goals
2016	1	0
Total	1	0

Statistics accurate as of match played 29 March 2016
