= Ugochukwu Oduenyi =

Nigerian footballer

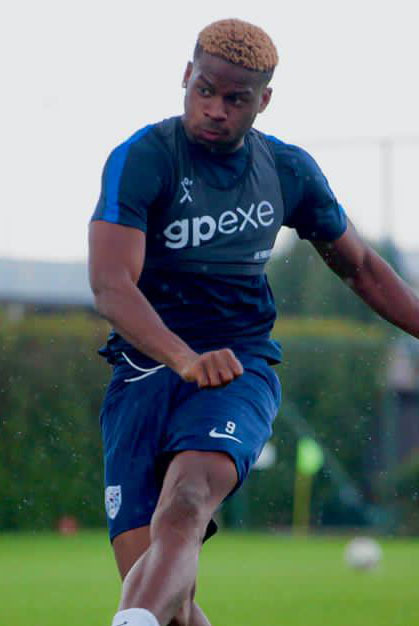
- Oduenyi in 2021

Personal information
- Full name: Ugochukwu Ogbonnaya Oduenyi
- Date of birth: 3 February 1996 (age 30)
- Place of birth: Lagos, Nigeria
- Height: 1.92 m (6 ft 4 in)
- Position: Forward

Team information
- Current team: Becamex HCMC
- Number: 94

Youth career
- Emmanuel Amunike Academy

Senior career*
Years	Team	Apps	(Gls)
2018–2019	LASK	0	(0)
2018–2019	→ Sesvete (loan)	3	(0)
2019	→ SV Horn (loan)	6	(1)
2019–2020	SV Ried	1	(0)
2021	Mynai	9	(0)
2021	Zhetysu	7	(1)
2022	Javor Ivanjica	12	(0)
2023	Hegelmann	25	(3)
2024	Sūduva	20	(1)
2025	Quang Nam	16	(3)
2025–	Becamex HCMC	25	(5)
- * Club domestic league appearances and goals as of 7 June 2026

Ugochukwu Ogbonnaya Oduenyi (born 3 February 1996) is a Nigerian professional footballer who plays as a forward for V.League 1 club Becamex HCMC.

== Career ==
Oduenyi started his career at famous Emmanuel Amuneke academy in Lagos, Nigeria.

=== Austria and Croatia ===
In August 2018, Oduenyi left the shores of Nigeria and signed with Austrian Bundesliga club LASK. He penned two-year deal with the Austrian club but was loaned to Croatian Second Football League club NK Sesvete.

In October 2018 he made his debut for Sesvete in the Croatian Second Football League when he came on as a substitute for Mario Vasilj in the 60th minute against NK BSK Bijelo Brdo on matchday eight of the 2018–19 season. The loan ended during the winter break of that season.

Oduenyi moved on loan to 2. Liga club SV Horn in January 2019. He made his debut in the second division with SV Horn in February 2019, when he was in the starting line-up against FC Liefering on matchday 16 of that season and was replaced by Kelvin Arase in the 58th minute.

In September 2019, Oduenyi signed permanently with another Austrian club SV Ried in the second division. He was part of the team success to gain promotion to the Austrian Bundesliga in 2020 and was released after contract expiration.

=== Ukraine and Kazakhstan ===
In January 2021, Oduenyi signed for Mynai to join Ukraine Premier League team as a free player and was handed a famous No. 9 jersey. Oduenyi made his debut for Mynai on 13 February 2021.

On 25 August 2021, Zhetysu announced the signing of Oduenyi.

=== Lithuania ===
In April 2023 it was announced that he had signed with Lithuanian Hegelmann Club. On 23 April 2023 he made his debut in A Lyga against DFK Dainava.

=== Vietnam ===
Following his departure from Quang Nam, Oduenyi joined Becamex HCMC in August 2025.
