= Philip Ipole =

Nigerian footballer

Personal information
- Full name: Philip Orite Ipole
- Date of birth: 6 June 2001 (age 25)
- Place of birth: Otukpo, Nigeria
- Height: 1.87 m (6 ft 1 1/2 in)
- Position: Centre-back

Team information
- Current team: Hapoel Afula
- Number: 4

Youth career
- –2019: NUB Kaduna
- 2019–2021: PFC Sochi

Senior career*
Years	Team	Apps	(Gls)
2021–2023	Sochi	0	(0)
2021	→ Zhetysu (loan)	7	(0)
2021–2022	→ Olimp-Dolgoprudny (loan)	16	(1)
2022–2023	→ Hapoel Hadera (loan)	28	(0)
2023–2024	Hapoel Hadera	54	(0)
2024	Hapoel Acre	4	(0)
2025–	Hapoel Afula	21	(1)
- * Club domestic league appearances and goals as of 24 June 2026

Philip Orite Ipole (born 6 June 2001) is a Nigerian footballer who plays for Israeli club Hapoel Afula.

== Club career ==
He made his debut in the Russian Football National League for FC Olimp-Dolgoprudny on 17 July 2021 in a game against FC Rotor Volgograd.

== Career statistics ==
=== Club ===
As of match played 17 July 2021

Appearances and goals by club, season and competition
Club	Season	League			National Cup		Continental		Other		Total	
Club	Season	Division	Apps	Goals	Apps	Goals	Apps	Goals	Apps	Goals	Apps	Goals
Zhetysu	2021	Kazakhstan Premier League	7	0	0	0	—		—		7	0
Olimp-Dolgoprudny	2021–22	Russian FNL	16	1	1	0	—		—		17	1
Hapoel Hadera	2022–23	Israeli Premier League	28	0	0	0	—		5	0	33	0
Hapoel Hadera	2023–24	Israeli Premier League	26	0	1	0	—		4	0	31	0
Hapoel Acre	2024–25	Liga Leumit	0	0	0	0	—		—		0	0
Career total			77	1	2	0	-	-	9	0	88	1
