= Illya Kalpachuk =

Belarusian footballer

Personal information
- Date of birth: 9 October 1990 (age 36)
- Place of birth: Biaroza, Brest Oblast, Belarusian SSR
- Height: 1.84 m (6 ft 1/2 in)
- Position: Defender

Team information
- Current team: Legionovia Legionowo
- Number: 4

Youth career
- 2005–2007: Dinamo Minsk

Senior career*
Years	Team	Apps	(Gls)
2010–2011	Dinamo Brest	5	(0)
2012–2013	Volna Pinsk	52	(4)
2014	Gomel	0	(0)
2014	→ Granit Mikashevichi (loan)	25	(1)
2015–2017	Gorodeya	30	(0)
2017	Atlantas	13	(1)
2018	Kauno Žalgiris	10	(1)
2019–2020	Rukh Brest	42	(2)
2021	Zhetysu	12	(0)
2022–2024	Dinamo Brest	56	(3)
2025–	Legionovia Legionowo	14	(2)
- * Club domestic league appearances and goals as of 10:18, 24 June 2025 (UTC)

Illya Kalpachuk (Belarusian: Ілля Калпачук; Russian: Илья Колпачук; born 9 October 1990) is a Belarusian professional footballer who plays as a defender for IV liga Masovia club Legionovia Legionowo.

== Career ==
In 2017, he joined Atlantas, before moving to Kauno Žalgiris the following year. After two seasons in Lithuania, he returned to Belarus and joined Rukh Brest.
