= Viktor Kovalev =

Kazakhstani footballer

Personal information
- Full name: Viktor Kovalev
- Date of birth: 25 August 1980 (age 46)
- Place of birth: Kazakhstan
- Position: Defender

Youth career
- –1997: Zhetysu

Senior career*
Years	Team	Apps	(Gls)
1997–2002	Zhetysu		
2002–2004	Aktobe		
2004	Ordabasy		
2005–2008	Alma-Ata		
2009–2015	Zhetysu		
Total		259	(9)
- * Club domestic league appearances and goals as of 2 July 2015

Viktor Kovalev (25 August 1980) is a retired Kazakhstani professional footballer.

== Career ==
Kovalev appeared in 19 Kazakhstan Premier League matches for FC Alma-Ata during the 2008 season.

Kovalev retired on 1 July 2015, joining the coaching staff of FC Zhetysu.
