= Marko Putinčanin =

Serbian footballer

Personal information
- Full name: Marko Putinčanin
- Date of birth: 16 December 1987 (age 38)
- Place of birth: Belgrade, SFR Yugoslavia
- Height: 1.85 m (6 ft 1 in)
- Positions: Midfielder; right-back

Youth career
- 1993–2004: Zemun

Senior career*
| Years | Team | Apps | (Gls) |
| 2004–2006 | Radnički Nova Pazova | | |
| 2006–2007 | Zemun | 19 | (0) |
| 2007–2009 | Bežanija | 43 | (2) |
| 2009–2011 | Dinamo Tirana | 46 | (1) |
| 2011–2012 | Bežanija | 26 | (3) |
| 2012 | Donji Srem | 13 | (1) |
| 2013 | Bežanija | 27 | (4) |
| 2014 | Zhetysu | 30 | (0) |
| 2015–2016 | Radnik Surdulica | 33 | (0) |
| 2016–2018 | Voždovac | 54 | (3) |
| 2018 | Vojvodina | 15 | (1) |
| 2018–2020 | Olimpija Ljubljana | 38 | (4) |
| 2020 | Voždovac | 19 | (5) |
| 2021 | Navbahor Namangan | 8 | (0) |
| 2021–2022 | FCI Levadia | 33 | (4) |
| 2022–2023 | Napredak Kruševac | 28 | (3) |
| Total | | 432 | (31) |
- * Club domestic league appearances and goals as of 27 December 2023

Marko Putinčanin (Serbian Cyrillic: Марко Путинчанин; born 16 December 1987) is a Serbian footballer who most recently played for FK Napredak Kruševac. He can play either as a midfielder or a right-back.

== Club career ==
Putinčanin has played in his home country clubs Radnički Nova Pazova, Zemun, and Bežanija, before joining Albanian club Dinamo Tirana in 2009.

In December 2014, Putinčanin left Zhetysu after one season with the club.

In January 2018, Putinčanin signed an 18-month-deal with Serbian club Vojvodina.

In late June 2018, Putinčanin signed for Slovenian club Olimpija Ljubljana.

== Honours ==
FCI Levadia

- Meistriliiga:2021
- Estonian Supercup: 2022

Olimpija Ljubljana

- Slovenian Cup: 2018–19, 2020–21

Dinamo Tirana

- Kategoria Superiore: 2009–10
