= Denis Poyarkov =

Russian footballer

Personal information
- Full name: Denis Vladimirovich Poyarkov
- Date of birth: 16 October 1989 (age 37)
- Place of birth: Yefremov, Russian SFSR
- Height: 1.78 m (5 ft 10 in)
- Position: Midfielder

Youth career
- Master-Saturn Yegoryevsk

Senior career*
Years	Team	Apps	(Gls)
2007–2009	FC Moscow	0	(0)
2010–2012	FC Metallurg Lipetsk	57	(6)
2012–2013	FC Sokol Saratov	14	(2)
2013–2014	FC Metallurg Lipetsk	46	(9)
2015–2017	FC Tambov	63	(7)
2018	FC Khimki	13	(0)
2018–2020	FC Mordovia Saransk	54	(3)
2020	FC Tom Tomsk	10	(0)
2021	FC Zhetysu	14	(0)
2021–2023	FC Metallurg Lipetsk	60	(0)
- * Club domestic league appearances and goals

Denis Vladimirovich Poyarkov (Russian: Денис Владимирович Поярков; born 16 October 1989) is a Russian former professional football player.

== Club career ==
He made his Russian Football National League debut for FC Tambov on 11 July 2016 in a game against FC SKA-Khabarovsk.
