= Rauan Orynbasar =

Kazakhstani footballer

Personal information
- Full name: Rauan Talgatuly Orynbasar
- Date of birth: 1 March 1998 (age 28)
- Place of birth: Taldykorgan, Kazakhstan
- Height: 1.83 m (6 ft 0 in)
- Position: Defender

Team information
- Current team: Zhetysu
- Number: 5

Senior career*
Years	Team	Apps	(Gls)
2017–2024	Zhetysu	57	(3)
2025	Irtysh Pavlodar	10	(2)
2025	Turan	11	(0)
2026–	Zhetysu	24	(0)

International career
2016–2020	Kazakhstan U21	14	(0)
2019–	Kazakhstan	1	(0)
- * Club domestic league appearances and goals as of 1 November 2026

Rauan Talgatuly Orynbasar (Kazakh: Рауан Талғатұлы Орынбасар; born 1 March 1998) is a Kazakhstani footballer who plays as a centre-back or defensive midfielder for Zhetysu. He made one appearance for the Kazakhstan national team in 2019.

== Career ==
Orynbasar made his international debut for Kazakhstan national team on 21 February 2019 in a friendly international match against Moldova, which finished as 1–0 victory for Kazakhstan.
