= FC Zhetysu =

Association football club in Kazakhstan

Jetisu Taldykorgan
- Full name: Football Club Jetisu Taldykorgan; Жетісу Талдықорған Футбол Клубы
- Founded: 1981; 45 years ago
- Ground: Zhetysu Stadium; Taldykorgan, Kazakhstan
- Capacity: 4,000
- Chairman: Donsebaev Kalmuhamet
- Manager: Samat Smakov
- League: Kazakhstan First League
- 2025: 12th
Home colours	Away colours

Jetisu Taldykorgan (Kazakh: Жетісу Талдықорған футбол клубы, Jetisu Taldyqorǵan Futbol Kluby) is a Kazakh professional football club based at the Zhetysu stadium in Taldykorgan. They are a founding member of the Kazakhstan Premier League, having missed five seasons because of relegations.

== History ==
=== Names ===
- 1981 : Founded as Jetisu
- 1993 : Renamed Taldykorgan
- 1994 : Renamed Kainar
- 1998 : Renamed Jetisu Promservice for sponsorship reasons
- 1999 : Renamed Jetisu

=== Domestic history ===
Season	League									Kazakhstan Cup	Top goalscorer		Managers
Season	Div.	Pos.	Pl.	W	D	L	GS	GA	P	Kazakhstan Cup	Name	League	Managers
1992	1st	21	18	8	3	7	32	20	27	First round			
1993	1st	25	24	2	3	19	16	55	7	Withdrew			
1994	2nd	2	36	26	7	3	64	21	59	Withdrew			
1995	1st	6	30	13	6	11	33	32	45	First round			
1996	1st	9	34	14	6	14	35	40	48	Second round			
1997	2nd	5	4	1	0	3	7	16	3	-			
1998	2nd	4	3	0	0	3	2	14	0	-			
1999	1st	15	30	3	4	23	18	68	13	First round			
2000	1st	14	28	4	2	22	15	73	14	Withdrew			
2001	1st	14	32	7	5	20	38	57	26	Withdrew			
2002	2nd	5	24	11	3	10	50	30	36	Quarter-final			
2003	1st	8	32	14	6	12	46	38	48	Last 16			
2004	1st	13	36	11	7	18	34	55	40	Quarter-final			
2005	1st	15	30	4	7	19	28	60	19	First round			
2006	2nd	1	26	25	1	0	119	14	76	Last 16			
2007	1st	5	30	13	7	10	33	32	46	Last 16			
2008	1st	6	30	11	8	11	28	27	41	Quarter-final			
2009	1st	5	26	13	5	8	33	26	44	Semi-final	(Serbia) Danilo Belić	13	
2010	1st	7	32	13	10	9	36	26	49	Semi-final	(Serbia) Danilo Belić	13	
2011	1st	2	32	19	5	8	51	27	38	First round	(Uzbekistan) Ulugbek Bakayev	18	(Kazakhstan) Serik Abdualiyev
2012	1st	12	26	6	5	15	27	45	23	Quarter-final	(Croatia) Edin Junuzović	8	(Kazakhstan) Serik Abdualiyev (Serbia) Slobodan Krčmarević
2013	1st	9	32	6	17	9	22	32	22	First round	(Croatia) Edin Junuzović (Kazakhstan) Murat Tleshev	4	(Russia) Omari Tetradze
2014	1st	8	32	10	8	14	21	31	25	First round	(Kazakhstan) Sergei Schaff	4	(Russia) Omari Tetradze (Kazakhstan) Askar Kozhabergenov
2015	1st	11	32	8	6	18	28	46	22	Quarter-final	(North Macedonia) Dušan Savić	12	(Kazakhstan) Askar Kozhabergenov (Kazakhstan) Ivan Azovskiy
2016	1st	12	32	8	7	17	37	53	31	Quarter-final	(North Macedonia) Dušan Savić	10	(Kazakhstan) Almas Kulshinbaev
2017	2nd	1	24	20	2	2	53	10	62	Quarter-final			
2018	1st	6	33	11	10	12	36	40	43	Last 16	(Moldova) Oleg Hromțov (Lithuania) Mantas Kuklys	5	(Kazakhstan) Dmitry Ogai
2019	1st	5	33	16	8	9	45	25	56	Last 16	(Bulgaria) Martin Toshev	9	(Kazakhstan) Dmitry Ogai
2020	1st	6	20	9	1	10	27	28	28	-	(Kazakhstan) Aybar Zhaksylykov	6	(Kazakhstan) Dmitry Ogai
2021	1st	14	26	5	4	17	23	47	16	Group Stage	(Estonia) Artjom Dmitrijev (Kazakhstan) Aybar Zhaksylykov	4	(Kazakhstan) Rinat Alyuetov

=== Continental ===
As of match played 12 July 2012

Competition	Pld	W	D	L	GF	GA	GD
UEFA Intertoto Cup	2	0	0	2	3	6	-3
UEFA Europa League	2	0	1	1	1	3	-2
Total	4	0	1	3	4	9	-5

Season	Competition	Round	Club	Home	Away	Aggregate
2008	UEFA Intertoto Cup	R1	(Hungary) Budapest Honvéd	1–2	2–4	3–6
2012–13	UEFA Europa League	1QR	(Poland) Lech Poznań	1–1	0–2	1–3

== Honours ==
- Kazakhstan First Division
  - Champions (1): 2006

== Current squad ==
As of 3 August 2026

Note: Flags indicate national team as defined under FIFA eligibility rules; some limited exceptions apply. Players may hold more than one non-FIFA nationality.

No.	Pos.	Nation	Player
1	GK	KAZ	Artur Egorov
2	DF	KAZ	Rafkat Aslan
3	DF	VEN	Diego Luna
4	DF	KAZ	Dinmukhammed Kashken
5	DF	KAZ	Rauan Orynbasar
7	MF	KAZ	Serikzhan Muzhikov
8	MF	KAZ	Adam Adakhadzhiev
9	FW	KAZ	Shokhan Abzalov
10	MF	GEO	Tsotne Mosiashvili
11	DF	KAZ	Adilkhan Dobay
15	DF	MNE	Jovan Pajovic

No.	Pos.	Nation	Player
17	FW	KAZ	Nurbergen Nurbol
18	MF	KAZ	Vyacheslav Shvyryov
20	FW	KAZ	Shyngys Anuarbek
21	MF	KAZ	Madi Zhakipbayev
22	GK	KAZ	Danil Podymskiy
23	DF	KAZ	Askhat Baltabekov
27	FW	SRB	Marko Zivanovic
73	FW	KAZ	Erbol Kurmanakhan
77	FW	KAZ	Nurbol Anuarbekov
88	GK	MDA	Ștefan Sicaci
90	FW	SRB	Strahinja Jovanović

== Managers ==
- (Kazakhstan) Vladimir Stepanov (2001)
- (Kazakhstan) Vakhid Masudov (2004)
- (Ukraine) Igor Svechnikov (2005)
- (Moldova) Ilie Carp (27 July 2008 – 26 September 2008)
- (Kazakhstan) Yuri Konkov (1 January 2010 – 5 September 2010)
- (Kazakhstan) Serik Abdualiyev (1 January 2011 – 10 May 2012)
- (Serbia) Slobodan Krčmarević (1 June 2012 – 1 February 2013)
- (Russia) Omari Tetradze (10 February, 2013–23 Sep 2014)
- (Kazakhstan) Askar Kozhabergenov (Sep 2014–20 Apr 2015)
- (Kazakhstan) Ivan Azovskiy (20 April 2015 – 5 January 2016)
- (Kazakhstan) Almas Kulshinbaev (5 January, 2016–2017)
- (Kazakhstan) Kayrat Nurdauletov (20 December 2023–)
