= 2014 FC Aktobe season =

FC Aktobe
2014 season
- Chairman: Sagat Yensegenuly
- Manager: Vladimir Nikitenko until 8 July 2014; Vladimir Gazzayev from 10 July 2014
- Stadium: Central Stadium
- Kazakhstan Premier League: 2nd
- Kazakhstan Cup: Runner-Up vs Kairat
- Kazakhstan Super Cup: Winners
- Champions League: Third Qualifying Round vs Steaua București
- Europa League: Play-off Round vs Legia Warsaw
- Top goalscorer: League: Marat Khairullin (9); All: Oleksiy Antonov (11)
Home colours	Away colours

The 2014 FC Aktobe season was the 14th successive season that the club playing in the Kazakhstan Premier League, the highest tier of association football in Kazakhstan. Aktobe were the reigning Champions, having won the 2013 title, but failed to retain their crowning, finishing second behind Champions FC Astana . They reached the final of the Kazakhstan Cup and the Play-off Round of the Europa League before falling to Legia Warsaw.

== Squad ==
As of 31 July 2014

Note: Flags indicate national team as defined under FIFA eligibility rules; some limited exceptions apply. Players may hold more than one non-FIFA nationality.

No.	Pos.	Nation	Player
1	GK	KAZ	Igor Trofimets
3	DF	KAZ	Aleksei Muldarov
5	DF	KAZ	Petr Badlo (captain)
6	MF	RUS	Taras Tsarikayev
7	DF	KAZ	Dmitri Miroshnichenko
9	FW	ARM	Marcos Pizzelli (on loan from FC Krasnodar)
10	FW	KAZ	Marat Khairullin
11	FW	BRA	Danilo Neco
12	DF	TTO	Robert Primus
16	DF	ARM	Robert Arzumanyan
17	MF	KAZ	Askhat Tagybergen
18	MF	KAZ	Pavel Shabalin
20	DF	KAZ	Evgeni Levin
22	DF	KAZ	Valeri Korobkin

No.	Pos.	Nation	Player
23	DF	KAZ	Yuriy Logvinenko
25	DF	KAZ	Sayat Zhumagali
35	GK	KAZ	Stanislav Pavlov
40	GK	KAZ	Almat Bekbaev
55	GK	KAZ	Andrei Sidelnikov
70	DF	BRA	Anderson Mineiro
75	MF	KAZ	Didar Zhalmukan
78	FW	BLR	Ihar Zyankovich
80	MF	UZB	Timur Kapadze
86	FW	UKR	Oleksiy Antonov
95	FW	KAZ	Abat Aimbetov
96	MF	KAZ	Anuarbek Sadykov
—	DF	KGZ	Emil Kenzhesariev

== Transfers ==
=== Winter ===
In: Note: Flags indicate national team as defined under FIFA eligibility rules; some limited exceptions apply. Players may hold more than one non-FIFA nationality.

No.	Pos.	Nation	Player
6	MF	RUS	Taras Tsarikayev (from (Russia) Alania Vladikavkaz)
8	FW	UKR	Artem Milevskyi (from (Turkey) Gaziantepspor)
9	FW	ARM	Marcos Pizzelli (loan from (Russia) Krasnodar)
11	FW	BRA	Danilo Neco (from (Russia) Alania Vladikavkaz)
18	MF	KAZ	Pavel Shabalin (from (Kazakhstan) Irtysh)
22	DF	KAZ	Valeri Korobkin (from (Kazakhstan) Astana)
40	GK	KAZ	Almat Bekbaev (from (Kazakhstan) Tobol)
78	FW	BLR	Ihar Zyankovich (from (Kazakhstan) Shakhter Karagandy)

Out: Note: Flags indicate national team as defined under FIFA eligibility rules; some limited exceptions apply. Players may hold more than one non-FIFA nationality.

No.	Pos.	Nation	Player
8	FW	RUS	Sergei Davydov (loan return to (Russia) Rubin Kazan)
8	FW	UKR	Artem Milevskyi
14	FW	KAZ	Sergey Gridin (to (Kazakhstan) Atyrau)
19	FW	KAZ	Sergei Lisenkov (to (Kazakhstan) Akzhayik)
22	DF	KAZ	Sanat Shalekenov (to (Kazakhstan) Akzhayik)
39	MF	MDA	Serghei Covalciuc (retired)
89	DF	KAZ	Aldan Baltaev (to (Kazakhstan) Kaisar)

=== Summer ===
In: Note: Flags indicate national team as defined under FIFA eligibility rules; some limited exceptions apply. Players may hold more than one non-FIFA nationality.

No.	Pos.	Nation	Player
20	DF	KAZ	Yevhen Levin (from (Kazakhstan) Ordabasy)
70	DF	BRA	Anderson Mineiro (from (Ukraine) Chornomorets Odesa)
86	FW	UKR	Oleksiy Antonov (from (Ukraine) Chornomorets Odesa)

Out: Note: Flags indicate national team as defined under FIFA eligibility rules; some limited exceptions apply. Players may hold more than one non-FIFA nationality.

No.	Pos.	Nation	Player
4	MF	RUS	Andrei Kharabara
13	MF	KAZ	Evgeni Dyadenko
34	GK	KAZ	Zhasur Narzikulov (to (Kazakhstan) Taraz)
50	FW	UZB	Alexander Geynrikh (to (Uzbekistan) Lokomotiv Tashkent)

== Competitions ==
=== Kazakhstan Super Cup ===
9 March 2014	Aktobe	1 – 0	Shakhter Karagandy	Astana
14:00 (UTC+6)	Logvinenko (yellow card) 32'; Neco 68'	Summary	Simčević (yellow card) 38'; Konysbayev (yellow card) 58'	Stadium: Astana Arena; Attendance: 14,000; Referee: Ruslan Duzmambetov

=== Kazakhstan Premier League ===
==== First round ====
===== Results summary =====
Overall								Home						Away					
Pld	W	D	L	GF	GA	GD	Pts	W	D	L	GF	GA	GD	W	D	L	GF	GA	GD
22	12	7	3	34	17	+17	43	8	3	0	22	3	+19	4	4	3	12	14	−2

Last updated: 19 November 2014.
Source: Soccerway

===== Results by round =====
Round	1	2	3	4	5	6	7	8	9	10	11	12	13	14	15	16	17	18	19	20	21	22
Ground	A	A	H	A	H	A	H	A	H	A	H	H	A	H	A	H	A	H	A	H	A	H
Result	W	D	W	D	W	L	W	W	W	W	W	W	W	D	L	D	D	D	L	W	D	W
Position	1	1	1	2	1	3	3	1	1	1	1	1	1	1	1	1	1	1	2	1	1	1

Source: Soccerway
A = Away; H = Home; W = Win; D = Draw; L = Loss

===== Results =====
15 March 2014 1	Taraz	0 – 2	Aktobe	Taraz
16:00 (UTC+6)	Z.Kozhamberdy (yellow card) 27'; Dosmagambetov (yellow card) 70'; M.Amirkhanov (yellow card) 73'	Summary	Khairullin 41' (pen.); Bandjar 43' (o.g.)	Stadium: Central Stadium; Attendance: 2,000; Referee: Igor Khisamutdinov

22 March 2014 2	Shakhter Karagandy	1 – 1	Aktobe	Karaganda
15:00 (UTC+6)	Malyi (yellow card) 17'; Simčević (yellow card) 27'; Vasiljević (yellow card) 35'; T.Zhangylyshbai 65' (yellow card) 85'	Summary	Logvinenko (yellow card) 32' (goal) 45'; Khairullin (red card) 85'	Stadium: Shakhter Stadium; Attendance: 4,000; Referee: Viktor Antonov

29 March 2014 3	Aktobe	3 – 0	Spartak Semey	Aktobe
16:00 (UTC+6)	Zyankovich 17', 58'; Shabalin 47'; Miroshnichenko (yellow card) 89'	Summary	S.Sagindikov (yellow card) 34'; I.Amirseitov (yellow card) 59'; M.Samchenko (yellow card) 64'	Stadium: Central Stadium; Attendance: 5,000; Referee: Aleksandr Aliyev

5 April 2014 4	Atyrau	0 – 0	Aktobe	Atyrau
15:00 (UTC+6)	Karpovich (yellow card) 38'; Abdulin (yellow card) 90'	Summary	Logvinenko (yellow card) 48'; Korobkin (yellow card) 63' (red card) 64'; P.Badlo (yellow card) 82'	Stadium: Munaishy Stadium; Attendance: 3,500; Referee: Aydin Rakhimbayev

9 April 2014 5	Aktobe	1 – 0	Zhetysu	Aktobe
17:00 (UTC+6)	Pizzelli 74'; A.Tagybergen (yellow card) 82'	Summary	Klimavičius (yellow card) 38'; K.Zarechny (red card) 82'	Stadium: Central Stadium; Attendance: 3,000; Referee: Igor Chesnokov

13 April 2014 6	Ordabasy	1 – 0	Aktobe	Shymkent
16:00 (UTC+6)	Junuzović 2'; Geteriev (yellow card) 61'; Ashirbekov (yellow card) 86'; Grigorenko (yellow card) 90+2'	Summary	Muldarov (yellow card) 5'	Stadium: Kazhimukan Munaitpasov Stadium; Attendance: 4,500; Referee: Igor Aleshin

19 April 2014 7	Aktobe	3 – 0	Kaisar	Aktobe
17:00 (UTC+6)	Geynrikh 45+1'; Danilo Neco 49'; Korobkin (yellow card) 84'; Miroshnichenko 90+4'	Summary		Stadium: Central Stadium; Attendance: 5,000; Referee: Denis Izmailov

27 April 2014 8	Astana	1 – 2	Aktobe	Astana
15:00 (UTC+6)	Kéthévoama 15'; Cañas (yellow card) 84'; Kuat (yellow card) 88'	Summary	Zyankovich 4' (yellow card) 88'; Khairullin 45'; A.Tagybergen (yellow card) 70'; P.Badlo (yellow card) 90+1'	Stadium: Astana Arena; Attendance: 8,800; Referee: Ruslan Duzmambetov

1 May 2014 9	Aktobe	1 – 0	Kairat	Aktobe
18:00 (UTC+6)	Khairullin 25' (yellow card) 60'; Danilo Neco (yellow card) 54'; P.Badlo (yellow card) 58'	Summary	Islamkhan (yellow card) 12'; Yedigaryan (yellow card) 57'; Marković (yellow card) 60'	Stadium: Central Stadium; Attendance: 3,000; Referee: Aleksandr Gauzer

6 May 2014 10	Tobol	0 – 2	Aktobe	Kostanay
19:00 (UTC+6)		Summary	Danilo Neco 14'; A.Tagybergen (yellow card) 24'; Kapadze 70'	Stadium: Kostanay Central Stadium; Attendance: 5,500; Referee: Askhat Abdanbayev

10 May 2014 11	Aktobe	3 – 0	Irtysh	Aktobe
19:00 (UTC+6)	Khairullin (yellow card) 53' (goal) 69'; Geynrikh 83'; Pizzelli 83' (pen.)	Summary		Stadium: Central Stadium; Attendance: 3,000; Referee: Igor Chesnokov

18 May 2014 12	Aktobe	4 – 0	Shakhter Karagandy	Aktobe
19:30 (UTC+6)	P.Badlo (yellow card) 20'; Danilo Neco 30' (yellow card) 83'; Zyankovich (yellow card) 36'; Miroshnichenko 63'; Geynrikh 65'; Pizzelli 87'	Summary	Vičius (yellow card) 33'; Finonchenko (yellow card) 77'; T.Zhangylyshbai (yellow card) 85'	Stadium: Central Stadium; Attendance: 3,000; Referee: Aydin Rakhimbayev

24 May 2014 13	Spartak Semey	0 – 1	Aktobe	Semey
14:00 (UTC+6)		Summary	Arzumanyan (yellow card) 8'; Pizzelli 68'; Shabalin (yellow card) 88'	Stadium: Spartak Stadium; Attendance: 3,000; Referee: Igor Aleshin

28 May 2014 14	Aktobe	0 – 0	Atyrau	Aktobe
21:00 (UTC+6)	Danilo Neco (yellow card) 52'; Khairullin (yellow card) 85'	Summary	Karpovich (yellow card) 31'; Parkhachev (yellow card) 70'	Stadium: Central Stadium; Attendance: 13,500; Referee: Marat Iskakov

1 June 2014 15	Zhetysu	1 – 0	Aktobe	Taldykorgan
17:00 (UTC+6)	Goa 26'; Putinčanin (yellow card) 84'	Summary	Miroshnichenko (yellow card) 15'; Shabalin (yellow card) 48'; Geynrikh (yellow card) 84'	Stadium: Zhetysu Stadium; Attendance: 3,000; Referee: Aleksandr Gauzer

14 June 2014 16	Aktobe	1 – 1	Ordabasy	Aktobe
20:00 (UTC+6)	Anderson Mineiro (yellow card) 15'; Zyankovich 29' (pen.) (yellow card) 45+1'	Summary	Nurgaliev (yellow card) 26'; Kasyanov (yellow card) 66'; Ashirbekov 69'; Grigorenko (yellow card) 90+2'	Stadium: Central Stadium; Attendance: 11,000; Referee: Artyom Kuchin

22 June 2014 17	Kaisar	2 – 2	Aktobe	Kyzylorda
19:00 (UTC+6)	Zemlianukhin 14'; Hunt 90+2'	Summary	Primus (yellow card) 45+1'; Zyankovich 50' (pen.); Pizzelli 72'	Stadium: Gany Muratbayev Stadium; Attendance: 4,500; Referee: Igor Aleshin

27 June 2014 18	Aktobe	1 – 1	Astana	Aktobe
21:00 (UTC+6)	Korobkin 3'; Antonov (yellow card) 65'; Neco (yellow card) 79'	Summary	Cícero 32'; Kéthévoama (yellow card) 38'	Stadium: Central Stadium; Attendance: 11,000; Referee: Aydin Rakhimbayev

6 July 2014 19	Kairat	7 – 1	Aktobe	Almaty
20:00 (UTC+6)	Gohou 8', 76', 83' (yellow card) 69'; Knežević 25', 56' (pen.); Pliyev 46'; Islamkhan 52'	Summary	Muldarov (yellow card) 48'; Shabalin (yellow card) 56'; Khairullin (yellow card) 59'; Antonov 87'	Stadium: Central Stadium; Attendance: 12,000; Referee: Artyom Kuchin

11 July 2014 20	Aktobe	3 – 1	Tobol	Aktobe
21:00 (UTC+6)	Logvinenko 43'; Antonov 58'; Zyankovich 62'; Shabalin (yellow card) 90+2'	Summary	Šimkovič 5'; Irismetov (yellow card) 35'	Stadium: Central Stadium; Attendance: 10,000; Referee: Askhat Abdanbayev

26 July 2014 21	Irtysh	1 – 1	Aktobe	Pavlodar
19:00 (UTC+6)	Dudchenko 26'; Chuchman (yellow card) 29'; Burzanović (yellow card) 59'	Summary	A.Tagybergen (yellow card) 11'; Kapadze (yellow card) 61'; Anderson Mineiro 79'	Stadium: Pavlodar Central Stadium; Attendance: 2,200; Referee: Aleksandr Gauzer

2 August 2014 22	Aktobe	2 – 0	Taraz	Aktobe
20:00 (UTC+6)	Arzumanyan 32'; Khairullin 43'; Logvinenko (yellow card) 43'; Shabalin (yellow card) 77'	Summary	Kuchma (yellow card) 41'; D.Ubbink (yellow card) 56'; Z.Kozhamberdy (yellow card) 88'	Stadium: Central Stadium; Attendance: 8,000; Referee: Ruslan Duzmambetov

===== League table =====
Pos	Team	Pld	W	D	L	GF	GA	GD	Pts	Qualification
1	Aktobe	22	12	7	3	34	17	+17	43	Qualification for the championship round
2	Kairat	22	13	3	6	41	20	+21	42	Qualification for the championship round
3	Astana	22	10	9	3	34	17	+17	39	Qualification for the championship round
4	Shakhter Karagandy	22	11	3	8	33	27	+6	36	Qualification for the championship round
5	Ordabasy	22	10	5	7	24	22	+2	35	Qualification for the championship round

Source: Soccerway (in Russian)
Rules for classification: 1st points;
Two team tiebreak: 1st overall wins; 2nd head-to-head record; 3rd goals difference; 4th goals scored; 5th away goals scored;
Multiple teams tiebreak: 1st overall wins; 2nd goals difference; 3rd goals scored; 4th away goals scored

==== Championship Round ====
===== Results summary =====
Overall								Home						Away					
Pld	W	D	L	GF	GA	GD	Pts	W	D	L	GF	GA	GD	W	D	L	GF	GA	GD
10	5	3	2	18	14	+4	18	4	1	0	11	2	+9	1	2	2	7	12	−5

Last updated: 18 November 2014.
Source: Soccerway

===== Results by round =====
Round	1	2	3	4	5	6	7	8	9	10
Ground	1	2	3	4	5	6	7	8	9	10
Result	D	D	L	L	W	W	D	W	W	W
Position	3	3	3	3	3	3	3	3	3	2

Source: Soccerway
A = Away; H = Home; W = Win; D = Draw; L = Loss

===== Results =====
22 August 2014 1	Aktobe	Postponed	Ordabasy	Aktobe
(UTC+6)		[ Summary]		Stadium: Central Stadium

28 August 2014 2	Aktobe	Postponed	Astana	Aktobe
(UTC+6)		Summary		Stadium: Central Stadium

14 September 2014 3	Shakhter Karagandy	1 – 1	Aktobe	Karaganda
17:30 (UTC+6)	Paryvaew (yellow card) 24'; Simčević (yellow card) 45'; Topcagić (yellow card) 75' (yellow-red card) 85'; Mokin (yellow card) 80'; Finonchenko 90+1' (yellow card) 90+1'	Summary	Miroshnichenko (yellow card) 43'; Khairullin (yellow card) 45' (goal) 88'; Korobkin (yellow card) 52'; Muldarov (yellow card) 90'	Stadium: Shakhter Stadium; Attendance: 4,200; Referee: Viktor Antonov

20 September 2014 4	Aktobe	0 – 0	Kaisar	Aktobe
18:00 (UTC+6)		Summary	E.Altynbekov (yellow card) 61'	Stadium: Central Stadium; Attendance: 7,000; Referee: Aydin Rakhimbayev

28 September 2014 5	Kairat	2 – 0	Aktobe	Almaty
18:00 (UTC+6)	Isael 21'; Islamkhan 53'; Khomich (yellow card) 62'; Marković (yellow card) 62'; A.Darabayev (yellow card) 64'	Summary	Korobkin (yellow card) 18'; Pizzelli (yellow card) 62'; Anderson Mineiro (yellow card) 62'; Muldarov (yellow card) 80'	Stadium: Central Stadium; Attendance: 10,000; Referee: Artyom Kuchin

4 October 2014 6	Astana	6 – 1	Aktobe	Astana
18:30 (UTC+6)	Twumasi 41', 52', 75'; Kéthévoama 51', 65'; Dzholchiev (yellow card) 71'; Kojašević 87' (pen.)	Summary	Tsarikayev (yellow card) 4'; P.Badlo (yellow card) 35'; Antonov 57'	Stadium: Astana Arena; Attendance: 4,000; Referee: Denis Izmailov

18 October 2014 7	Aktobe	3 – 1	Shakhter Karagandy	Aktobe
18:00 (UTC+6)	Antonov 11', 42'; A.Tagybergen (yellow card) 56'; Pizzelli 67'	Summary	Kirov (yellow card) 44'; Finonchenko 77'; Vičius (yellow card) 78'	Stadium: Central Stadium; Attendance: 7,000; Referee: Akmalkhan Kholmatov

22 October 2014 1	Aktobe	4 – 1	Ordabasy	Aktobe
19:00 (UTC+6)	Danilo Neco 30', 64'; Antonov (yellow card) 65'; Pizzelli 73'; Khairullin 86' (yellow card) 90+1'; A.Tagybergen (yellow card) 89'	Summary	G.Suyumbaev (yellow card) 33'; Ashirbekov 44'	Stadium: Central Stadium; Attendance: 5,000; Referee: Ruslan Duzmambetov

26 October 2014 8	Kaisar	2 – 2	Aktobe	Kyzylorda
16:00 (UTC+6)	Zemlianukhin 45+1' (pen.); Furdui (yellow card) 53' (goal) 87'	Summary	Antonov 20', 40' (yellow card) 35'; Miroshnichenko (red card) 45'; Arzumanyan (yellow card) 83'; A.Tagybergen (yellow card) 86'; Logvinenko (yellow card) 87'	Stadium: Gany Muratbayev Stadium; Attendance: 2,000; Referee: Artyom Kuchin

1 November 2014 9	Aktobe	1 – 0	Kairat	Aktobe
18:00 (UTC+6)	Muldarov (yellow card) 62'; Arzumanyan (yellow card) 63'; Khairullin (yellow card) 63'; D.Zhalmukan (yellow card) 83' (goal) 83'	Summary	Yedigaryan (yellow card) 25'; A.Darabayev (yellow card) 42'; Kuat (yellow card) 42'; Michalík (yellow card) 63'	Stadium: Central Stadium; Attendance: 8,000; Referee: Igor Aleshin

5 November 2014 2	Aktobe	3 – 0	Astana	Aktobe
18:00 (UTC+6)	Antonov 41'; A.Tagybergen 45'; Arzumanyan (yellow card) 69'; Khairullin 90+3'	Summary	R.Khairullin (yellow card) 29'; Beisebekov (yellow card) 29'; Y.Akhmetov (yellow card) 60'	Stadium: Central Stadium

9 November 2014 10	Ordabasy	1 – 3	Aktobe	Shymkent
15:00 (UTC+6)	Kasyanov (yellow card) 14'; Freire (yellow card) 36'; Mwesigwa (yellow card) 85'; Ashirbekov 87'	Summary	Anderson Mineiro (yellow card) 31'; A.Tagybergen (yellow card) 42'; Pizzelli 61'; Khairullin 67'; Korobkin 78'; Aimbetov (yellow card) 83'; Antonov (yellow card) 88'; Miroshnichenko (yellow card) 90+1'	Stadium: Kazhimukan Munaitpasov Stadium; Attendance: 2,000; Referee: Aleksandr Aliyev

===== Table =====
Pos	Team	Pld	W	D	L	GF	GA	GD	Pts	Qualification
1	Astana (C)	32	18	10	4	63	26	+37	45	Qualification for the Champions League second qualifying round
2	Aktobe	32	17	10	5	52	31	+21	40	Qualification for the Europa League first qualifying round
3	Kairat	32	18	5	9	58	31	+27	38	Qualification for the Europa League first qualifying round
4	Ordabasy	32	13	5	14	34	44	−10	27	Qualification for the Europa League first qualifying round
5	Kaisar	32	10	13	9	30	34	−4	27	

Source: Soccerway (in Russian)
Rules for classification: 1st points;
Two team tiebreak: 1st overall wins; 2nd head-to-head record; 3rd goals difference; 4th goals scored; 5th away goals scored;
Multiple teams tiebreak: 1st overall wins; 2nd goals difference; 3rd goals scored; 4th away goals scored.
Team start with half number of points from first round.
(C) Champions

=== Kazakhstan Cup ===
14 May 2014 Second Round	Kaisar	0 – 3	Aktobe	Kyzylorda
18:00 (UTC+6)	O.Altaev (yellow card) 55'; Coulibaly (yellow card) 71'	Summary	Zyankovich 56'; Aimbetov 59'; Muldarov (yellow card) 71'; Korobkin 85'; Arzumanyan (yellow card) 90+1'	Stadium: Gany Muratbayev Stadium; Attendance: 4,000; Referee: Artyom Kuchin

18 June 2014 Quarter-final	Aktobe	2 – 1	Taraz	Aktobe
20:00 (UTC+6)	Antonov 22', 88' (yellow card) 25'; E.Levin (yellow card) 90+1'	Summary	M.Amirkhanov (yellow card) 25'; Tleshev 62' (yellow card) 71' (red card) 90+5'	Stadium: Central Stadium; Attendance: 10,000; Referee: Viktor Antonov

16 August 2014 Semi Final 1st leg	Aktobe	1 – 1	Astana	Aktobe
21:00 (UTC+6)	Tsarikayev (yellow card) 49'; Pizzelli 63'	Summary	Y.Akhmetov (yellow card) 24'; Kéthévoama 26' (yellow card) 39'	Stadium: Central Stadium; Attendance: 9,000; Referee: Aydin Rakhimbayev

24 September 2014 Semi Final 2nd leg	Astana	1 – 1 (a.e.t.) (2 – 2 agg.) (3 – 4 p)	Aktobe	Astana
18:00 (UTC+6)	Loginovskiy (yellow card) 19'; Nusserbayev 41'; Y.Goryachi (yellow card) 62'	Summary	Pizzelli 20' (pen.) (yellow card) 90+1'; Khairullin (yellow card) 28'	Stadium: Astana Arena; Attendance: 4,000; Referee: Akmalkhan Kholmatov

22 November 2014 Final	Kairat	4 – 1	Aktobe	Astana
15:00 (UTC+6)	Arzumanyan 19' (o.g.); Gohou 30', 64'; Michalík (yellow card) 57'; Darabayev 89'; Sito Riera (red card) 89'	Summary	Anderson Mineiro (yellow card) 25'; Logvinenko 29'; Korobkin (yellow card) 59'	Stadium: Astana Arena; Attendance: 7,500; Referee: Ruslan Duzmambetov

=== UEFA Champions League ===
==== Qualifying rounds ====
16 July 2014 Second qualifying round 1st Leg	Dinamo Tbilisi (Georgia (country))	0 – 1	(Kazakhstan) Aktobe	Tbilisi, Georgia
23:00 (UTC+6)	Dosoudil (yellow card) 59'	Summary	Tsarikayev (yellow card) 49'; Danilo Neco 51'; Khairullin (yellow card) 55'; Logvinenko (yellow card) 61'; Anderson Mineiro (yellow card) 83'	Stadium: Dinamo Arena; Attendance: 10,100; Referee: Paweł Raczkowski (Poland)

23 July 2014 Second qualifying round 2nd Leg	Aktobe (Kazakhstan)	3 – 0 (4 – 0 agg.)	(Georgia (country)) Dinamo Tbilisi	Aktobe, Kazakhstan
21:00 (UTC+6)	Antonov (yellow card) 15' (goal) 75'; Muldarov (yellow card) 45+2'; Zyankovich 82'; Aimbetov 90+4'	Summary	Xisco (yellow card) 45+2'; Totadze (yellow card) 57'; Khurtsilava (yellow card) 61'; Loria (yellow card) 65'; Vouho (yellow card) 90+1'	Stadium: Central Stadium; Attendance: 12,100; Referee: Aliyar Ağayev (Azerbaijan)

30 July 2014 Third qualifying round 1st Leg	Aktobe (Kazakhstan)	2 – 2	(Romania) Steaua București	Aktobe, Kazakhstan
21:00 (UTC+6)	Muldarov (yellow card) 18'; Korobkin 58'; Antonov (yellow card) 65'; Arzumanyan 87'	Summary	Latovlevici (yellow card) 20'; Keșerü 44'; Filip (yellow card) 45'; Prepeliță 78'; Iancu (yellow card) 90'	Stadium: Central Stadium; Attendance: 12,200; Referee: Hüseyin Göçek (Turkey)

6 August 2014 Third qualifying round 2nd Leg	Steaua București (Romania)	2 – 1 (4 – 3 agg.)	(Kazakhstan) Aktobe	Bucharest, Romania
23:30 (UTC+6)	Chipciu 3'; Stanciu 39'	Summary	Anderson Mineiro (yellow card) 11'; Logvinenko (yellow card) 24' (yellow-red card) 57'; Korobkin (yellow card) 35'; Kapadze 85'	Stadium: Arena Națională; Attendance: 24,386; Referee: Miroslav Zelinka (Czech Republic)

=== UEFA Europa League ===
==== Qualifying rounds ====
21 August 2014 Play-off round 1st Leg	Aktobe (Kazakhstan)	0 – 1	(Poland) Legia Warsaw	Aktobe, Kazakhstan
21:00 (UTC+6)	Korobkin (yellow card) 72'	Summary	Duda 48'	Stadium: Central Stadium; Attendance: 11,500; Referee: Sergei Karasev (Russia)

29 August 2014 Play-off round 2nd Leg	Legia Warsaw (Poland)	2 – 0 (3 – 0 agg.)	(Kazakhstan) Aktobe	Warsaw, Poland
01:00 (UTC+6)	Kucharczyk 26'; Vrdoljak 66' (pen.); Kosecki (yellow card) 69'	Summary	Korobkin (yellow card) 22'; Logvinenko (yellow card) 65'	Stadium: Pepsi Arena; Attendance: 18,549; Referee: Mattias Gestranius (Finland)

== Squad statistics ==
As of Match played 22 November 2014

=== Appearances and goals ===
No.	Pos	Nat	Player	Total		Premier League		Kazakhstan Cup		Europe		Kazakhstan Super Cup		
No.	Pos	Nat	Player	Apps	Goals	Apps	Goals	Apps	Goals	Apps	Goals	Apps	Goals	
3	DF	(Kazakhstan) KAZ	Aleksei Muldarov	30	0	23	0	2	0	4	0	1	0	
5	DF	(Kazakhstan) KAZ	Petr Badlo	13	0	11	0	0+1	0	0	0	1	0	
6	MF	(Russia) RUS	Taras Tsarikayev	33	0	18+5	0	3+1	0	5+1	0	0	0	
7	DF	(Kazakhstan) KAZ	Dmitri Miroshnichenko	37	2	26	2	4	0	6	0	1	0	
9	FW	(Armenia) ARM	Marcos Pizzelli	39	10	17+11	8	5	2	5	0	0+1	0	
10	MF	(Kazakhstan) KAZ	Marat Khairullin	40	9	25+3	9	4+1	0	6	0	1	0	
11	FW	(Brazil) BRA	Danilo Neco	34	7	21+4	5	2	0	6	1	1	1	
12	DF	(Trinidad and Tobago) TTO	Robert Primus	1	0	1	0	0	0	0	0	0	0	
16	DF	(Armenia) ARM	Robert Arzumanyan	37	2	26	1	4+1	0	5	1	1	0	
17	MF	(Kazakhstan) KAZ	Askhat Tagybergen	35	1	14+13	1	4	0	2+1	0	0+1	0	
18	MF	(Kazakhstan) KAZ	Pavel Shabalin	26	1	8+13	1	1+1	0	0+2	0	0+1	0	
20	DF	(Kazakhstan) KAZ	Evgeni Levin	6	0	3+2	0	1	0	0	0	0	0	
22	DF	(Kazakhstan) KAZ	Valeri Korobkin	42	4	30	2	3+2	1	6	1	1	0	
23	DF	(Kazakhstan) KAZ	Yuriy Logvinenko	30	3	21+1	2	4	1	3	0	1	0	
35	GK	(Kazakhstan) KAZ	Stanislav Pavlov	1	0	1	0	0	0	0	0	0	0	
40	GK	(Kazakhstan) KAZ	Almat Bekbaev	1	0	1	0	0	0	0	0	0	0	
55	GK	(Kazakhstan) KAZ	Andrei Sidelnikov	42	0	30	0	5	0	6	0	1	0	
70	DF	(Brazil) BRA	Anderson Mineiro	24	1	15	1	3	0	6	0	0	0	
75	MF	(Kazakhstan) KAZ	Didar Zhalmukan	4	1	0+3	1	0+1	0	0	0	0	0	
78	FW	(Belarus) BLR	Ihar Zyankovich	36	8	16+11	6	4	1	0+5	1	0	0	0
80	MF	(Uzbekistan) UZB	Timur Kapadze	33	3	21+6	1	1+1	0	0+4	1	0	1	0
86	FW	(Ukraine) UKR	Oleksiy Antonov	28	11	13+3	8	2+2	2	6	1	2	0	
95	FW	(Kazakhstan) KAZ	Abat Aimbetov	20	2	2+11	0	1+2	1	0+4	1	0	0	0
Players who appeared for Aktobe that left during the season:
4	MF	(Russia) RUS	Andrei Kharabara	1	0	0	0	1	0	0	0	0	0	
50	FW	(Uzbekistan) UZB	Alexander Geynrikh	15	3	9+4	3	1	0	0	0	1	0	

=== Goal scorers ===
Place	Position	Nation	Number	Name	Premier League	Kazakhstan Cup	UEFA Champions League	UEFA Europa League	Kazakhstan Super Cup	Total
1	FW	(Ukraine)	86	Oleksiy Antonov	8	2	1	0	0	11
2	FW	(Armenia)	9	Marcos Pizzelli	8	2	0	0	0	10
3	MF	(Kazakhstan)	10	Marat Khairullin	9	0	0	0	0	9
4	FW	(Belarus)	78	Ihar Zyankovich	6	1	1	0	0	8
5	FW	(Brazil)	11	Danilo Neco	5	0	1	0	1	7
6	DF	(Kazakhstan)	21	Valeri Korobkin	2	1	1	0	0	4
7	FW	(Uzbekistan)	50	Alexander Geynrikh	3	0	0	0	0	3
7	DF	(Kazakhstan)	23	Yuriy Logvinenko	2	1	0	0	0	3
9	DF	(Kazakhstan)	7	Dmitri Miroshnichenko	2	0	0	0	0	2
9	DF	(Armenia)	16	Robert Arzumanyan	1	0	1	0	0	2
9	FW	(Kazakhstan)	95	Abat Aimbetov	0	1	1	0	0	2
12	MF	(Uzbekistan)	80	Timur Kapadze	1	0	1	0	0	1
12	MF	(Kazakhstan)	18	Pavel Shabalin	1	0	0	0	0	1
12	DF	(Brazil)	70	Anderson Mineiro	1	0	0	0	0	1
12	MF	(Kazakhstan)	75	Didar Zhalmukan	1	0	0	0	0	1
12	MF	(Kazakhstan)	17	Askhat Tagybergen	1	0	0	0	0	1
12				Own goal	1	0	0	0	0	1
				TOTALS	52	8	7	0	1	68

=== Disciplinary record ===
Number	Nation	Position	Name	Premier League		Kazakhstan Cup		UEFA Champions League		UEFA Europa League		Kazakhstan Super Cup		Total	
Number	Nation	Position	Name	Yellow card	Red card	Yellow card	Red card	Yellow card	Red card	Yellow card	Red card	Yellow card	Red card	Yellow card	Red card
3	(Kazakhstan)	DF	Aleksei Muldarov	5	0	1	0	2	0	0	0	0	0	6	0
5	(Kazakhstan)	DF	Petr Badlo	5	0	0	0	0	0	0	0	0	0	1	0
6	(Russia)	MF	Taras Tsarikayev	1	0	1	0	1	0	0	0	0	0	3	0
7	(Kazakhstan)	DF	Dmitri Miroshnichenko	4	1	0	0	0	0	0	0	0	0	2	1
9	(Armenia)	FW	Marcos Pizzelli	1	0	1	0	0	0	0	0	0	0	2	0
10	(Kazakhstan)	MF	Marat Khairullin	7	1	1	0	1	0	0	0	0	0	5	0
11	(Brazil)	FW	Danilo Neco	4	0	0	0	0	0	0	0	0	0	1	0
12	(Trinidad and Tobago)	DF	Robert Primus	1	0	0	0	0	0	0	0	0	0	1	0
16	(Armenia)	DF	Robert Arzumanyan	4	0	1	0	0	0	0	0	0	0	4	0
17	(Kazakhstan)	MF	Askhat Tagybergen	8	0	0	0	0	0	0	0	0	0	4	0
18	(Kazakhstan)	MF	Pavel Shabalin	5	0	0	0	0	0	0	0	0	0	1	0
20	(Kazakhstan)	DF	Evgeni Levin	0	0	1	0	0	0	0	0	0	0	1	0
22	(Kazakhstan)	DF	Valeri Korobkin	4	1	1	0	1	0	2	0	0	0	6	0
23	(Kazakhstan)	DF	Yuriy Logvinenko	4	0	0	0	3	1	1	0	1	0	6	1
50	(Uzbekistan)	FW	Alexander Geynrikh	1	0	0	0	0	0	0	0	0	0	1	0
70	(Brazil)	DF	Anderson Mineiro	3	0	1	0	2	0	0	0	0	0	6	0
75	(Kazakhstan)	MF	Didar Zhalmukan	1	0	0	0	0	0	0	0	0	0	1	0
78	(Belarus)	FW	Ihar Zyankovich	3	0	0	0	0	0	0	0	0	0	1	0
80	(Uzbekistan)	MF	Timur Kapadze	1	0	0	0	0	0	0	0	0	0	1	0
86	(Ukraine)	FW	Oleksiy Antonov	4	0	1	0	2	0	0	0	0	0	6	0
95	(Kazakhstan)	FW	Abat Aimbetov	1	0	0	0	0	0	0	0	0	0	1	0
			TOTALS	67	3	9	0	12	1	3	0	1	0	92	4
