= 2015 FC Kairat season =

FC Kairat
2015 season
- Chairman: Kairat Boranbayev
- Manager: Vladimír Weiss
- Stadium: Central Stadium
- Kazakhstan Premier League: 2nd
- Kazakhstan Cup: Winners
- Kazakhstan Super Cup: Runners-up
- Europa League: Play-off round vs Bordeaux
- Top goalscorer: League: Gerard Gohou (22); All: Gerard Gohou (29)
Home colours	Away colours	Third colours

The 2015 FC Kairat season was the fifth successive season that the club played in the Kazakhstan Premier League, the highest tier of association football in Kazakhstan, since their promotion back to the top flight in 2009. As reigning Kazakhstan Cup champions, Kairat participated in the Kazakhstan Super Cup, where they lost to FC Astana on penalties. They also competed in the Europa League.

== Squad ==
As of match played 21 November 2015

No.	Name	Nationality	Position	Date of birth (age)	Signed from	Signed in	Apps.	Goals
Goalkeepers
1	Vladimir Plotnikov	(Kazakhstan)	GK	3 April 1986 (aged 29)	Zhetysu	2015	42	0
16	Serhiy Tkachuk	(Kazakhstan)	GK	15 February 1992 (aged 23)	Shakhter Karagandy	2014	10	0
30	Vladimir Groshev	(Kazakhstan)	GK	4 January 1995 (aged 20)	Academy	2012	0	0
31	Oleg Grubov	(Kazakhstan)	GK	4 March 1997 (aged 18)	Academy	2015	0	0
31	Khamit Nigmetov	(Kazakhstan)	GK	30 April 1996 (aged 19)	Academy	2014	0	0
33	Birzhan Nuradil	(Kazakhstan)	GK	24 June 1996 (aged 19)	Academy	2014	0	0
Defenders
2	Timur Rudoselskiy	(Kazakhstan)	DF	21 December 1994 (aged 20)	Academy	2012	44	0
3	Zaurbek Pliyev	(Russia)	DF	27 September 1991 (aged 24)	Alania Vladikavkaz	2014	57	4
4	Bruno Soares	(Brazil)	DF	21 August 1988 (aged 27)	Fortuna Düsseldorf	2015	24	1
5	Mark Gorman	(Kazakhstan)	DF	9 February 1989 (aged 26)	Lokomotiv Astana	2012	127	2
6	Žarko Marković	(Serbia)	DF	28 January 1987 (aged 28)	Gaz Metan Mediaș	2014	62	5
13	Yermek Kuantayev	(Kazakhstan)	DF	13 October 1990 (aged 25)	Tobol	2014	67	6
34	Islam Abidov	(Kazakhstan)	DF	13 September 1996 (aged 19)	Academy	2015	0	0
35	Aybol Abiken	(Kazakhstan)	DF	1 June 1996 (aged 19)	Academy	2015	0	0
36	Alibek Kassym	(Kazakhstan)	DF	27 May 1998 (aged 17)	Academy	2015	0	0
36	Nurbol Askar	(Kazakhstan)	DF	19 February 1995 (aged 20)	Academy	2014	0	0
42	Islam Iminov	(Kazakhstan)	DF	29 April 1996 (aged 19)	Academy	2015	0	0
43	Elzhas Kambarov	(Kazakhstan)	DF	23 May 1996 (aged 19)	Academy	2015	0	0
46	Yernar Kydyrali	(Kazakhstan)	DF	15 December 1995 (aged 19)	Academy	2012	0	0
48	Dilshat Musayev	(Kazakhstan)	DF	9 January 1995 (aged 20)	Academy	2012	0	0
52	Anuar Umashov	(Kazakhstan)	DF	30 August 1995 (aged 20)	Academy	2012	0	0
Midfielders
7	Zhambyl Kukeyev	(Kazakhstan)	MF	20 September 1988 (aged 27)	Shakhter Karagandy	2013	30	5
8	Mikhail Bakayev	(Russia)	MF	5 August 1987 (aged 28)	Alania Vladikavkaz	2014	73	1
9	Bauyrzhan Islamkhan	(Kazakhstan)	MF	23 February 1993 (aged 22)	Kuban Krasnodar	2014	83	18
10	Isael	(Brazil)	MF	13 May 1988 (aged 27)	Krasnodar	2014	60	13
17	Aslan Darabayev	(Kazakhstan)	MF	21 January 1989 (aged 26)	Shakhter Karagandy	2014	55	13
18	Vitali Li	(Kazakhstan)	MF	13 March 1994 (aged 21)	Shakhter Karagandy	2013	35	4
19	Stanislav Lunin	(Kazakhstan)	MF	13 March 1994 (aged 21)	Shakhter Karagandy	2014	44	0
20	Islambek Kuat	(Kazakhstan)	MF	12 January 1993 (aged 22)	Astana	2014	36	3
22	Serginho	(Brazil)	MF	3 December 1990 (aged 24)	Oeste	2015	22	3
24	Rifat Nurmagamet	(Kazakhstan)	MF	22 May 1996 (aged 19)	Academy	2014	5	0
25	Oybek Baltabaev	(Kazakhstan)	MF	13 June 1994 (aged 21)	Academy	2012	0	0
27	Ulan Konysbayev	(Kazakhstan)	MF	28 May 1989 (aged 26)	loan from Astana	2015	9	0
32	Zhandos Soltan	(Kazakhstan)	MF	10 September 1998 (aged 17)	Academy	2015	0	0
34	Maksim Kotov	(Kazakhstan)	MF	9 February 1997 (aged 18)	Academy	2015	0	0
37	Yusuf Azizov	(Kazakhstan)	MF	24 October 1995 (aged 20)	Academy	2014	0	0
38	Sulimzhan Bakiyev	(Kazakhstan)	MF	22 July 1996 (aged 19)	Academy	2015	0	0
39	Nurlan Dairov	(Kazakhstan)	MF	26 June 1995 (aged 20)	Academy	2012	0	0
40	Anuar Jagippar	(Kazakhstan)	MF	2 January 1995 (aged 20)	Academy	2013	0	0
44	Anatoliy Tymoshchuk	(Ukraine)	MF	30 March 1979 (aged 36)	Zenit St.Petersburg	2015	17	0
47	Rashid Lyukhay	(Kazakhstan)	MF	30 July 1997 (aged 18)	Academy	2015	0	0
49	Madiyar Raimbek	(Kazakhstan)	MF	15 August 1995 (aged 20)	Academy	2012	0	0
50	Nurzhigit Smatov	(Kazakhstan)	MF	11 July 1996 (aged 19)	Academy	2015	0	0
51	Kuanysh Sovetov	(Kazakhstan)	MF	11 May 1995 (aged 20)	Academy	2014	2	0
54	Mikhail Kharun-Zade	(Kazakhstan)	MF	2 February 1996 (aged 19)	Academy	2015	0	0
Forwards
11	Gerard Gohou	(Ivory Coast)	FW	29 December 1988 (aged 26)	Krasnodar	2014	60	43
14	Bauyrzhan Baytana	(Kazakhstan)	FW	6 May 1992 (aged 23)	Taraz	2014	16	1
15	Sito Riera	(Spain)	FW	5 January 1987 (aged 28)	Chornomorets Odesa	2014	53	6
28	Đorđe Despotović	(Serbia)	FW	4 March 1992 (aged 23)	loan from Red Star Belgrade	2015	17	11
29	Toktar Zhangylyshbay	(Kazakhstan)	FW	25 May 1993 (aged 22)	loan Astana	2015	2	0
41	Alikhan Zholberisov	(Kazakhstan)	FW	10 February 1997 (aged 18)	Academy	2015	0	0
44	Zhanserik Kohhanat	(Kazakhstan)	FW	9 April 1995 (aged 20)	Academy	2014	0	0
53	Salman Khabaev	(Kazakhstan)	FW	11 October 1995 (aged 20)	Academy	2015	0	0
Players away on loan
26	Bauyrzhan Tanirbergenov	(Kazakhstan)	MF	11 February 1995 (aged 20)	Academy	2012	1	0
	Ilya Karavaev	(Kazakhstan)	GK	4 May 1995 (aged 20)	Academy	2014	0	0
	Magomed Paragulgov	(Kazakhstan)	FW	26 March 1994 (aged 21)	Academy	2012	0	0
Players that left during the season
21	Momodou Ceesay	(The Gambia)	FW	24 December 1988 (aged 26)	MŠK Žilina	2013	48	19
23	Ilya Kalinin	(Kazakhstan)	MF	3 February 1992 (aged 23)	Tsesna	2012	38	2
	Ibrahim Moro	(Ghana)	MF	10 November 1993 (aged 22)	AIK	2015	0	0
	Paulo César	(Brazil)	MF	13 February 1995 (aged 20)	Corinthians	2015	0	0

== Transfers ==
=== Winter ===
In: Note: Flags indicate national team as defined under FIFA eligibility rules; some limited exceptions apply. Players may hold more than one non-FIFA nationality.

No.	Pos.	Nation	Player
1	GK	KAZ	Vladimir Plotnikov (from (Kazakhstan) Zhetysu)
4	MF	GHA	Ibrahim Moro (from (Sweden) AIK)
22	MF	BRA	Serginho (from (Brazil) Oeste, previously on loan at (Brazil) Palmeiras)
23	MF	KAZ	Ilia Kalinin (from (Kazakhstan) Kaisar)
—	MF	BRA	Paulo César (loan from (Brazil) Corinthians)

Out: Note: Flags indicate national team as defined under FIFA eligibility rules; some limited exceptions apply. Players may hold more than one non-FIFA nationality.

No.	Pos.	Nation	Player
5	DF	KAZ	Aleksandr Kislitsyn (to (Kazakhstan) Irtysh)
8	MF	KAZ	Samat Smakov (to (Kazakhstan) Irtysh)
10	MF	CRO	Josip Knežević
16	GK	RUS	Dmitri Khomich (to (Russia) Amkar Perm)
20	DF	SVK	Ľubomír Michalík (to (Slovakia) DAC Dunajská Streda)
23	FW	SVK	Miloš Lačný (to (Poland) Śląsk Wrocław)
27	MF	ARM	Artur Yedigaryan (to (Belarus) Dinamo Minsk)
—	GK	KAZ	Ilya Karavaev (loan to (Kazakhstan) CSKA Almaty)
—	MF	KAZ	Vladimir Sedelnikov (to (Kazakhstan) Irtysh)

=== Summer ===
In: Note: Flags indicate national team as defined under FIFA eligibility rules; some limited exceptions apply. Players may hold more than one non-FIFA nationality.

No.	Pos.	Nation	Player
4	DF	BRA	Bruno Soares (from (Germany) Fortuna Düsseldorf)
27	MF	KAZ	Ulan Konysbayev (loan from (Kazakhstan) Astana)
28	FW	SRB	Đorđe Despotović (loan from (Kazakhstan) Red Star Belgrade)
29	FW	KAZ	Toktar Zhangylyshbay (loan from (Kazakhstan) Astana)
44	MF	UKR	Anatoliy Tymoshchuk (from (Russia) Zenit St.Petersburg)

Out: Note: Flags indicate national team as defined under FIFA eligibility rules; some limited exceptions apply. Players may hold more than one non-FIFA nationality.

No.	Pos.	Nation	Player
21	FW	GAM	Momodou Ceesay
23	MF	KAZ	Ilia Kalinin (to (Kazakhstan) Kaisar)
—	MF	BRA	Paulo César (loan return to (Brazil) Corinthians)
—	MF	GHA	Ibrahim Moro (to (Turkey) Adana Demirspor)
—	FW	KAZ	Magomed Paragulgov (loan to (Kazakhstan) Spartak Semey)

== Competitions ==
=== Kazakhstan Super Cup ===
1 March 2015	Astana	0 – 0 (a.e.t.) (3 – 2 p)	Kairat	Astana
16:00 (UTC+6)	Aničić (yellow card) 87'; Konysbayev (yellow card) 111'	Summary; Report		Stadium: Astana Arena; Attendance: 20,000; Referee: Jonas Eriksson
	Penalties
	Shomko (penalty missed); Aničić (penalty scored); Cañas (penalty scored); Konysbayev (penalty missed); Kéthévoama (penalty missed); Beisebekov (penalty scored)		Darabayev (penalty missed); Marković (penalty missed); Riera (penalty scored); Pliyev (penalty missed); Rudoselskiy (penalty scored); I.Kalinin (penalty missed)

=== Kazakhstan Premier League ===
==== First round ====
===== Results summary =====
Overall								Home						Away					
Pld	W	D	L	GF	GA	GD	Pts	W	D	L	GF	GA	GD	W	D	L	GF	GA	GD
22	13	5	4	43	14	+29	44	9	0	2	23	4	+19	4	5	2	20	10	+10

Last updated: 28 July 2015.
Source: Soccerway

===== Results by round =====
Round	1	2	3	4	5	6	7	8	9	10	11	12	13	14	15	16	17	18	19	20	21	22
Ground	H	A	H	A	H	H	A	A	H	A	H	A	A	H	A	H	A	H	A	H	A	A
Result	W	D	W	L	W	W	D	L	W	D	L	L	W	W	W	W	D	W	W	W	D	W
Position	1	2	2	4	3	1	1	2	1	2	5	5	5	5	4	2	3	2	2	2	1	1

Source: Soccerway
A = Away; H = Home; W = Win; D = Draw; L = Loss

===== Results =====
7 March 2015 1	Kairat	4 – 0	Tobol	Almaty
17:00 (UTC+6)	Pliyev (yellow card) 15' (yellow-red card) 79'; Gohou 16', 35' (pen.), 90'; Marković (yellow card) 43'; Islamkhan 56' (pen.)	Summary	Kucera (yellow card) 23'; R.Aslan (yellow card) 24'; Kurgulin (yellow card) 64'	Stadium: Central Stadium; Attendance: 7,000; Referee: Viktor Antonov

11 March 2015 2	Aktobe	0 – 0	Kairat	Aktobe
16:00 (UTC+6)	A.Tagybergen (yellow card) 39'; Neco (yellow card) 90+2'	Summary		Stadium: Central Stadium; Attendance: 3,000; Referee: Askhat Abdanbayev

15 March 2015 3	Kairat	2 – 0	Zhetysu	Almaty
17:00 (UTC+6)	B.Baitana (yellow card) 50'; Kuantayev 59'; Gohou 90+3'	Summary	Despotović (yellow card) 45'; Cvetković (yellow card) 68'; Azovskiy (yellow card) 71'; A.Pasechenko (yellow card) 90+2'	Stadium: Central Stadium; Attendance: 6,500; Referee: Igor Chesnokov

21 March 2015 4	Taraz	1 – 0	Kairat	Taraz
14:00 (UTC+6)	Pyschur 28'; Mera (yellow card) 53'	Summary	Marković (yellow card) 58'; Bakayev (yellow card) 73'	Stadium: Central Stadium; Attendance: 3,000; Referee: Akmalkhan Kholmatov

5 April 2015 5	Kairat	4 – 0	Okzhetpes	Almaty
17:00 (UTC+6)	Gohou 41'; Isael 45', 76'; Riera 50'; Bakayev (yellow card) 70'	Summary	Buleshev (yellow card) 70'	Stadium: Central Stadium; Attendance: 8,000; Referee: Igor Aleshin

8 April 2015 7	Kairat	1 – 0	Irtysh	Almaty
19:00 (UTC+6)	Gohou 24'; Riera (yellow card) 86'	Summary	R.Yesimov (yellow card) 40'; I.Graf (yellow card) 68'	Stadium: Central Stadium; Attendance: 6,800; Referee: Denis Tevyashov

11 April 2015 6	Ordabasy	2 – 2	Kairat	Shymkent
14:00 (UTC+6)	Nurgaliev (yellow card) 10'; Malyi (yellow card) 15' (goal) 28'; Tazhimbetov 42'; G.Suyumbaev (yellow card) 62'; Simčević (yellow card) 88'; Petrov (yellow card) 90+1'	Summary	Gohou 15'; V.Li (yellow card) 22'; Pliyev (yellow card) 32'; Riera (yellow card) 87'; Marković 90+3'	Stadium: Kazhimukan Munaitpasov Stadium; Attendance: 4,000; Referee: Anatoyli Vishnichenko

19 April 2015 8	Astana	4 – 3	Kairat	Astana
18:00 (UTC+6)	Zhukov 11'; Maksimović 41'; Beisebekov (yellow card) 45+1'; Aničić (yellow card) 52'; Dzholchiev 69'; Nusserbayev (yellow card) 72' (goal) 82'	Summary	Gohou 20', 67' (yellow card) 45+1'; Islamkhan 38'	Stadium: Astana Arena; Attendance: 3,500; Referee: Denis Izmailov

25 April 2015 9	Kairat	4 – 0	Shakhter Karagandy	Almaty
17:00 (UTC+6)	Marković 10'; Isael 57'; Islamkhan 80'; Gohou 85'; Rudoselskiy (yellow card) 87'	Summary		Stadium: Central Stadium; Attendance: 8,000; Referee: Ruslan Duzmambetov

3 May 2015 10	Kaisar	0 – 0	Kairat	Kyzylorda
17:00 (UTC+6)	Irismetov (yellow card) 8'; D.Choi (yellow card) 28'; Klein (yellow card) 64'	Summary	Kuat (yellow card) 41'; Marković (yellow card) 86'	Stadium: Gany Muratbayev Stadium; Attendance: 4,800; Referee: Viktor Antonov

7 May 2015 11	Kairat	0 – 1	Atyrau	Almaty
17:00 (UTC+6)	Marković (yellow card) 77'	Summary	Parkhachev 56'; K.Zarechny (yellow card) 70'; Arzhanov (yellow card) 77'; Narzikulov (yellow card) 90+3'	Stadium: Central Stadium; Attendance: 9,000; Referee: Bagdat Abdullaev

16 May 2015 12	Kairat	1 – 2	Aktobe	Almaty
17:00 (UTC+6)	Islamkhan (yellow card) 33'; Kuat (yellow card) 45'; Pliyev (yellow card) 45'; Vladimir Plotnikov (yellow card) 45'; Bakayev (yellow card) 83'; Gohou 90+2'	Summary	Žulpa (yellow card) 21'; Mineiro (yellow card) 45'; Khizhnichenko 68'; Antonov 73'; A.Tagybergen (yellow card) 90+1'	Stadium: Central Stadium; Attendance: 12,500; Referee: Artyom Kuchin

24 May 2015 13	Zhetysu	0 – 3	Kairat	Taldykorgan
17:00 (UTC+6)		Summary	Islamkhan 17'; Pliyev (yellow card) 41'; Isael (yellow card) 76'; Gorman (yellow card) 81'; Gohou 83'; Kukeyev 89'	Stadium: Zhetysu Stadium; Attendance: 2,000; Referee: Bolat Karlibayev

29 May 2015 14	Kairat	2 – 0	Taraz	Almaty
19:00 (UTC+6)	Gohou (yellow card) 58' (goal) 69', 86'; Marković (yellow card) 73'	Summary	Dosmagambetov (yellow card) 43'; M.Togyzbay (yellow card) 48'	Stadium: Central Stadium; Attendance: 8,500; Referee: Denis Izmailov

6 June 2015 15	Okzhetpes	1 – 3	Kairat	Kokshetau
16:00 (UTC+6)	Rotkovic 23'; Smejkal (yellow card) 83'	Summary	Gohou 28', 37', 65'; Riera (yellow card) 71'	Stadium: Okzhetpes Stadium; Attendance: 1,500; Referee: Askhat Abdanbayev

20 June 2015 16	Kairat	2 – 1	Ordabasy	Almaty
19:30 (UTC+6)	Pliyev 35'; Islamkhan 60' (pen.); Gorman (yellow card) 70'; Isael (yellow card) 86'	Summary	Nurgaliev 32'; Malyi (yellow card) 54' (yellow-red card) 59'; G.Suyumbaev (yellow card) 87'; Božić (yellow card) 90+2'	Stadium: Central Stadium; Attendance: 9,500; Referee: Igor Aleshin

24 June 2015 17	Irtysh	1 – 1	Kairat	Pavlodar
19:00 (UTC+6)	Dudchenko 61'	Summary	Serginho (yellow card) 9'; Lunin (yellow card) 17'; Riera (yellow card) 20'; Gohou 79'	Stadium: Central Stadium; Attendance: 4,200; Referee: Ruslan Duzmambetov

28 June 2015 18	Kairat	2 – 0	Astana	Almaty
19:30 (UTC+6)	Kuat (yellow card) 14'; Isael 45+1'; Islamkhan 51' (pen.); Serginho (yellow card) 90+1'	Summary	Nusserbayev (yellow card) 58'; Postnikov (yellow card) 80'	Stadium: Central Stadium; Attendance: 9,500; Referee: Artyom Kuchin

5 July 2015 19	Shakhter Karagandy	0 – 5	Kairat	Karaganda
18:00 (UTC+6)	Vošahlík (yellow card) 5'	Summary	Serginho 6' (pen.); Riera 13', 59'; Isael (yellow card) 21'; Kukeyev (yellow card) 47' (goal) 83'; Ceesay 72'	Stadium: Shakhter Stadium; Attendance: 3,000; Referee: Viktor Antonov

12 July 2015 20	Kairat	1 – 0	Kaisar	Almaty
19:30 (UTC+6)	Despotović 17'	Summary	Matsveenka (yellow card) 90'	Stadium: Central Stadium; Attendance: 6,000; Referee: Bagdat Abdullaev

19 July 2015 21	Atyrau	0 – 0	Kairat	Atyrau
20:00 (UTC+6)	V.Kuzmin (yellow card) 71'; Essame (yellow card) 88'	Summary	Rudoselskiy (yellow card) 59'; Isael (yellow card) 62'; Soares (yellow card) 71'	Stadium: Munaishy Stadium; Attendance: 7,500; Referee: Igor Chesnokov

26 July 2015 22	Tobol	1 – 3	Kairat	Kostanay
19:00 (UTC+6)	Yavorskyi (yellow card) 42'; Zhumaskaliyev 73'	Summary	Despotović 20', 48'; Darabayev 58'	Stadium: Central Stadium; Attendance: 3,500; Referee: Bolat Karlibayev

===== League table =====
Pos	Team	Pld	W	D	L	GF	GA	GD	Pts	Qualification
1	Kairat	22	13	5	4	43	14	+29	44	Qualification for the championship round
2	Aktobe	22	12	8	2	27	12	+15	44	Qualification for the championship round
3	Astana	22	12	7	3	40	19	+21	43	Qualification for the championship round
4	Atyrau	22	9	10	3	25	19	+6	37	Qualification for the championship round
5	Ordabasy	22	9	8	5	21	18	+3	35	Qualification for the championship round

Source: UEFA.com, Soccerway
Rules for classification: 1) Points; 2) Matches won; 3) Head-to-head points; 4) Head-to-head matches won; 5) Head-to-head goal difference; 6) Head-to-head goals scored; 7) Head-to-head away goals scored; 8) Goal difference; 9) Goals scored; 10) Away goals scored; 11) Draw.

==== Championship round ====
===== Results summary =====
Overall								Home						Away					
Pld	W	D	L	GF	GA	GD	Pts	W	D	L	GF	GA	GD	W	D	L	GF	GA	GD
10	7	2	1	17	5	+12	23	3	1	1	9	4	+5	4	1	0	8	1	+7

Last updated: 8 November 2015.
Source: Soccerway

===== Results by round =====
Round	1	2	3	4	5	6	7	8	9	10
Ground	A	H	A	A	H	A	H	H	A	H
Result	D	W	W	W	W	W	D	L	W	W
Position	2	1	1	1	1	1	1	2	2	2

Source: Soccerway
A = Away; H = Home; W = Win; D = Draw; L = Loss

===== Results =====
14 August 2015 23	Ordabasy	0 – 0	Kairat	Shymkent
18:00 (UTC+6)	Nurgaliev (yellow card) 29'; Ashirbekov (yellow card) 45'; Tazhimbetov (yellow card) 77'; E. Tungyshbaev (yellow card) 86'	Summary	Zhangylyshbay (yellow card) 81'	Stadium: Kazhimukan Munaitpasov Stadium; Attendance: 3,500; Referee: Artyom Kuchin

24 August 2015 24	Kairat	5 – 2	Irtysh	Almaty
20:00 (UTC+6)	Kuat 15' (yellow card) 72'; Gohou 67', 75'; Kuantayev 78'; Despotović 87'	Summary	Roncatto 7'; N'Diaye (yellow card) 32' (goal) 56'; Fonseca (yellow card) 71'; Kassaï (yellow card) 83'	Stadium: Central Stadium; Attendance: 6,000; Referee: Askhat Abdanbayev

12 September 2015 25	Atyrau	1 – 2	Kairat	Atyrau
18:00 (UTC+6)	Essame 17'	Summary	Islamkhan 64'; Gohou 79'	Stadium: Munaishy Stadium; Attendance: 4,500; Referee: Igor Aleshin

20 September 2015 26	Astana	0 – 1	Kairat	Astana
20:00 (UTC+6)	Twumasi (yellow card) 37'	Summary	V.Li (yellow card) 29'; Isael 58'; Marković (yellow card) 77'	Stadium: Astana Arena; Attendance: 11,500; Referee: Askhat Abdanbayev

27 September 2015 27	Kairat	2 – 1	Aktobe	Almaty
18:00 (UTC+6)	Isael 10'; Gohou 13' (yellow card) 67'; Soares (yellow card) 25'	Summary	Mineiro (yellow card) 17'; Korobkin (yellow card) 55'; Danilo 59'; Logvinenko (red card) 60'; D.Miroshnichenko (yellow card) 63'	Stadium: Central Stadium; Attendance: 11,000; Referee: Viktor Antonov

3 October 2015 28	Irtysh	0 – 2	Kairat	Pavlodar
15:00 (UTC+6)	Aliev (yellow card) 70'	Summary	Despotović 2'; Bakayev (yellow card) 60'; Soares 78' (yellow card) 82'	Stadium: Central Stadium; Attendance: 4,200; Referee: Bolat Karlibayev

17 October 2015 29	Kairat	0 – 0	Atyrau	Almaty
18:00 (UTC+6)		Summary	Fomin (yellow card) 89'; Narzikulov (yellow card) 90+2'	Stadium: Central Stadium; Attendance: 5,500; Referee: Bagdat Abdullaev

25 October 2015 30	Kairat	0 – 1	Astana	Almaty
18:00 (UTC+6)		Summary	Nusserbayev 45+2' (yellow card) 90+6'; Dzholchiev (yellow card) 56'	Stadium: Central Stadium; Attendance: 16,000; Referee: Igor Aleshin

31 October 2015 31	Aktobe	0 – 3	Kairat	Aktobe
15:00 (UTC+6)	Žulpa (yellow card) 50'; Logvinenko (yellow card) 59'; Mineiro (yellow card) 81'	Summary	Konysbayev (yellow card) 12'; Serginho 53' (pen.), 85'; Kuat (yellow card) 58'; Marković (yellow card) 61'; Rudoselskiy (yellow card) 73'; Despotović 88'	Stadium: Central Stadium; Attendance: 8,000; Referee: Artyom Kuchin

8 November 2015 32	Kairat	2 – 0	Ordabasy	Almaty
15:00 (UTC+6)	Soares (yellow card) 45'; Kuat (yellow card) 54'; Despotović 64', 83'	Summary	Petrov (yellow card) 30'; B.Kozhabayev (yellow card) 52' (yellow-red card) 62'	Stadium: Central Stadium; Attendance: 9,000; Referee: Askhat Abdanbayev

===== League table =====
Pos	Team	Pld	W	D	L	GF	GA	GD	Pts	Qualification
1	Astana (C)	32	20	7	5	55	26	+29	46	Qualification for the Champions League second qualifying round
2	Kairat	32	20	7	5	60	19	+41	45	Qualification for the Europa League first qualifying round (Note: Kairat qualified for the UEFA Europa League first qualifying round by winning the 2015 Kazakhstan Cup.)
3	Aktobe	32	15	9	8	35	25	+10	32	Qualification for the Europa League first qualifying round
4	Ordabasy	32	12	10	10	32	31	+1	29	Qualification for the Europa League first qualifying round
5	Atyrau	32	11	12	9	31	33	−2	27	
6	Irtysh Pavlodar	32	10	10	12	37	39	−2	25	

Source: Soccerway
Rules for classification: 1) Points; 2) Play-off (only if deciding champion when two teams are tied); 3) Matches won; 4) Head-to-head points; 5) Head-to-head matches won; 6) Head-to-head goal difference; 7) Head-to-head goals scored; 8) Head-to-head away goals scored; 9) Goal difference; 10) Goals scored; 11) Away goals scored; 12) Play-off (only if deciding champion when three or teams are tied); 13) Draw.
(C) Champions

=== Kazakhstan Cup ===
29 April 2015 Second Round	Kairat	0 – 0 (a.e.t.) (4 – 1 p)	Irtysh	Almaty
19:00 (UTC+6)	Isael (yellow card) 15'; Pliyev (yellow card) 56'	Summary	Chernyshov (yellow card) 15'; Aliev (yellow card) 33'; I.Graf (yellow card) 66'; G.Sartakov (yellow card) 80'; Gatagov (yellow card) 116'; N.Kalmykov (yellow card) 120'	Stadium: Central Stadium; Attendance: 6,500; Referee: Igor Shesnokov
	Penalties
	Gohou (penalty scored); Isael (penalty scored); Islamkhan (penalty scored); Darabayev (penalty scored)		Bance (penalty missed); Bulgaru (penalty missed); Azuka (penalty scored)

20 May 2015 Quarterfinal	Kairat	4 – 1	Taraz	Almaty
19:00 (UTC+6)	Gohou 6', 58'; Islamkhan 13'; Kukeyev 87'	Summary	S.Zhumahanov (yellow card) 16'; A.Taubay (yellow card) 28'; Mukhutdinov 62' (pen.)	Stadium: Central Stadium; Attendance: 7,500; Referee: Igor Aleshin

2 June 2015 Semifinal 1st leg	Tobol	0 – 3	Kairat	Kostanay
20:00 (UTC+6)	Sadownichy (yellow card) 45'	Summary	Gohou 18'; Marković (yellow card) 31'; Rudoselskiy (yellow card) 47'; Islamkhan 59'; Isael 76'	Stadium: Central Stadium; Attendance: 4,000; Referee: Marat Iskakov

23 September 2015 Semifinal 2nd leg	Kairat	2 – 1 (5 – 1 agg.)	Tobol	Almaty
20:00 (UTC+6)	Riera 8'; Gorman 19'	Summary	Kurgulin (yellow card) 75'; Zhumaskaliyev 89'	Stadium: Central Stadium; Attendance: 7,000; Referee: Denis Tevyashov

==== Final ====
21 November 2015	Astana	1 – 2	Kairat	Astana
15:00 (UTC+6)	Shomko (yellow card) 15'; Twumasi 28'	Summary	Despotović (yellow card) 44' (goal) 48', 70'; Marković (yellow card) 64'	Stadium: Astana Arena; Attendance: 10,500; Referee: Cüneyt Çakır (Turkey)

=== UEFA Europa League ===
==== Qualifying rounds ====
3 July 2015 First qualifying round 1st leg	Red Star Belgrade (Serbia)	0 – 2	(Kazakhstan) Kairat	Belgrade, Serbia
00:45 (UTC+6)	Pavićević (red card) 3'; Katai (yellow card) 62'	Report	Marković (yellow card) 37'; Gohou 45' (yellow card) 87'; Kuantayev 64'	Stadium: Red Star Stadium; Attendance: 25,211; Referee: Bartosz Frankowski (Poland)

9 July 2015 First qualifying round 2nd leg	Kairat (Kazakhstan)	2 – 1 (4 – 1 agg.)	(Serbia) Red Star Belgrade	Almaty, Kazakhstan
20:00 (UTC+6)	Islamkhan 29'; Kuat 47'; Marković (yellow card) 63'; Gohou (yellow card) 89'	Report	Stojanović (yellow card) 8'; Mbodj (yellow card) 74'; Savićević 85' (pen.)	Stadium: Central Stadium; Attendance: 21,550; Referee: Barış Şimşek (Turkey)

16 July 2015 Second qualifying round 1st leg	Kairat (Kazakhstan)	3 – 0	(Armenia) Alashkert	Almaty, Kazakhstan
19:45 (UTC+6)	Islamkhan 14' (pen.); Soares (yellow card) 28'; Gohou 55'; Despotović 69'; Riera (yellow card) 90+1'	Report	Grigoryan (yellow card) 50'	Stadium: Central Stadium; Attendance: 22,100; Referee: Sergey Ivanov (Russia)

23 July 2015 Second qualifying round 2nd leg	Alashkert (Armenia)	2 – 1 (2 – 4 agg.)	(Kazakhstan) Kairat	Yerevan (Note: Alashkert play their home matches at Vazgen Sargsyan Republican Stadium, Yerevan, instead of their regular stadium Alashkert Stadium, Yerevan.), Armenia
21:00 (UTC+6)	Arakelyan 28'; Grigoryan (yellow card) 70'; Manasyan (yellow card) 77'; Minasyan (yellow card) 84'; Héber 90+4'	Report	Gohou 45+3'	Stadium: Vazgen Sargsyan Republican Stadium; Attendance: 2,500; Referee: João Capela (Portugal)

30 July 2015 Third qualifying round 1st leg	Kairat (Kazakhstan)	2 – 1	(Scotland) Aberdeen	Almaty, Kazakhstan
20:45 (UTC+6)	Bakayev 13'; Islamkhan 22'	Report	McLean 69'	Stadium: Central Stadium; Attendance: 23,500; Referee: Tamás Bognár (Hungary)

7 August 2015 Third qualifying round 2nd leg	Aberdeen (Scotland)	1 – 1 (3 – 2 agg.)	(Kazakhstan) Kairat	Aberdeen, Scotland
00:45 (UTC+6)	McLean 84'; Taylor (yellow card) 90+1'	Report	Marković (yellow card) 12'; Tymoshchuk (yellow card) 17'; Bakayev (yellow card) 43'; Gohou 59'; Lunin (yellow card) 84'; Vladimir Plotnikov (yellow card) 90+1'	Stadium: Pittodrie Stadium; Attendance: 20,317; Referee: Miroslav Zelinka (Czech Republic)

21 August 2015 Playoff round 1st leg	Bordeaux (France)	1 – 0	(Kazakhstan) Kairat	Bordeaux, France
00:30 (UTC+6)	Khazri 27'; Crivelli (yellow card) 89'	Report	Islamkhan (yellow card) 45'; Riera (yellow card) 79'; Tymoshchuk (yellow card) 84'	Stadium: Nouveau Stade de Bordeaux; Attendance: 24,795; Referee: Arnold Hunter (Northern Ireland)

27 August 2015 Playoff round 2nd leg	Kairat (Kazakhstan)	2 – 1 (2 – 2(a) agg.)	(France) Bordeaux	Almaty, Kazakhstan
20:45 (UTC+6)	Yambéré 1' (o.g.); Tymoshchuk (yellow card) 38'; Kuat 66'	Report	Traoré (yellow card) 21'; Khazri (yellow card) 39'; Yambéré (yellow card) 63'; Crivelli 77' (yellow card) 85'	Stadium: Central Stadium; Referee: Bas Nijhuis (Netherlands)

== Squad statistics ==
As of Match played 21 November 2015

=== Appearances and goals ===
No.	Pos	Nat	Player	Total		Premier League		Kazakhstan Cup		Kazakhstan Super Cup		UEFA Europa League	
No.	Pos	Nat	Player	Apps	Goals	Apps	Goals	Apps	Goals	Apps	Goals	Apps	Goals
1	GK	(Kazakhstan) KAZ	Vladimir Plotnikov	42	0	29	0	4	0	1	0	8	0
2	DF	(Kazakhstan) KAZ	Timur Rudoselskiy	37	0	23+7	0	4+1	0	1	0	0+1	0
3	DF	(Russia) RUS	Zaurbek Pliyev	26	1	20+2	1	3	0	1	0	0	0
4	DF	(Brazil) BRA	Bruno Soares	24	1	11+3	1	2	0	0	0	8	0
5	DF	(Kazakhstan) KAZ	Mark Gorman	41	1	24+4	0	4+1	1	1	0	5+2	0
6	DF	(Serbia) SRB	Žarko Marković	41	2	26+3	2	4	0	1	0	7	0
7	MF	(Kazakhstan) KAZ	Zhambyl Kukeyev	15	3	4+4	2	0+3	1	0	0	0+4	0
8	MF	(Russia) RUS	Mikhail Bakayev	36	1	26	0	5	0	1	0	4	1
9	MF	(Kazakhstan) KAZ	Bauyrzhan Islamkhan	42	12	22+7	7	4	2	1	0	8	3
10	MF	(Brazil) BRA	Isael	39	7	26+1	6	3	1	1	0	8	0
11	FW	(Ivory Coast) CIV	Gerard Gohou	40	29	23+5	22	2+2	3	1	0	7	4
13	DF	(Kazakhstan) KAZ	Yermek Kuantayev	35	3	23+2	2	2	0	1	0	7	1
14	MF	(Kazakhstan) KAZ	Bauyrzhan Baytana	5	0	2+1	0	0+1	0	0	0	1	0
15	FW	(Spain) ESP	Sito Riera	37	4	21+6	3	3	1	1	0	6	0
16	GK	(Kazakhstan) KAZ	Serhiy Tkachuk	4	0	3	0	1	0	0	0	0	0
17	MF	(Kazakhstan) KAZ	Aslan Darabayev	23	1	7+10	1	1+2	0	0+1	0	0+2	0
18	MF	(Kazakhstan) KAZ	Vitali Li	17	0	8+7	0	1+1	0	0	0	0	0
19	FW	(Kazakhstan) KAZ	Stanislav Lunin	23	0	7+8	0	2	0	0	0	6	0
20	MF	(Kazakhstan) KAZ	Islambek Kuat	29	3	17+2	1	2+1	0	0	0	6+1	2
22	MF	(Brazil) BRA	Serginho	22	3	7+7	3	3	0	0	0	0+5	0
23	MF	(Kazakhstan) KAZ	Ilya Kalinin	3	0	0+2	0	0	0	0+1	0	0	0
24	MF	(Kazakhstan) KAZ	Rifat Nurmugamet	2	0	0	0	0+2	0	0	0	0	0
27	MF	(Kazakhstan) KAZ	Ulan Konysbayev	9	0	5+1	0	1	0	0	0	0+2	0
28	FW	(Serbia) SRB	Đorđe Despotović	17	11	5+4	8	2	2	0	0	1+5	1
29	FW	(Kazakhstan) KAZ	Toktar Zhangylyshbay	2	0	1+1	0	0	0	0	0	0	0
44	MF	(Ukraine) UKR	Anatoliy Tymoshchuk	17	0	10	0	1	0	0	0	6	0
51	MF	(Kazakhstan) KAZ	Kuanysh Sovetov	1	0	1	0	0	0	0	0	0	0
Players away from Kairat on loan:
Players who appeared for Kairat that left during the season:
21	FW	(The Gambia) GAM	Momodou Ceesay	8	1	0+5	1	1+1	0	0+1	0	0	0

=== Goal scorers ===
Place	Position	Nation	Number	Name	Premier League	Kazakhstan Cup	Kazakhstan Super Cup	UEFA Europa League	Total
1	FW	(Ivory Coast)	11	Gerard Gohou	22	3	0	4	29
2	MF	(Kazakhstan)	9	Bauyrzhan Islamkhan	7	2	0	3	12
3	FW	(Serbia)	28	Đorđe Despotović	8	2	0	1	11
4	MF	(Brazil)	10	Isael	6	1	0	0	7
5	FW	(Spain)	15	Sito Riera	3	1	0	0	4
6	MF	(Brazil)	22	Serginho	3	0	0	0	3
6	MF	(Kazakhstan)	7	Zhambyl Kukeyev	2	1	0	0	3
6	DF	(Kazakhstan)	13	Yermek Kuantayev	2	0	0	1	3
6	MF	(Kazakhstan)	20	Islambek Kuat	1	0	0	2	3
10	DF	(Serbia)	6	Žarko Marković	2	0	0	0	2
11	DF	(Russia)	3	Zaurbek Pliyev	1	0	0	0	1
11	FW	(The Gambia)	21	Momodou Ceesay	1	0	0	0	1
11	MF	(Kazakhstan)	17	Aslan Darabayev	1	0	0	0	1
11	DF	(Brazil)	4	Bruno Soares	1	0	0	0	1
11	DF	(Kazakhstan)	5	Mark Gorman	0	1	0	0	1
11	MF	(Russia)	8	Mikhail Bakayev	0	0	0	1	1
11				Own goal	0	0	0	1	1
				TOTALS	60	11	0	13	84

=== Disciplinary record ===
Number	Nation	Position	Name	Premier League		Kazakhstan Cup		Kazakhstan Super Cup		UEFA Europa League		Total	
Number	Nation	Position	Name	Yellow card	Red card	Yellow card	Red card	Yellow card	Red card	Yellow card	Red card	Yellow card	Red card
1	(Kazakhstan)	GK	Vladimir Plotnikov	1	0	0	0	0	0	1	0	2	0
2	(Kazakhstan)	DF	Timur Rudoselskiy	3	0	1	0	0	0	0	0	4	0
3	(Russia)	DF	Zaurbek Pliyev	5	1	1	0	0	0	0	0	6	1
4	(Brazil)	DF	Bruno Soares	5	0	0	0	0	0	0	0	5	0
5	(Kazakhstan)	DF	Mark Gorman	2	0	0	0	0	0	0	0	2	0
6	(Serbia)	DF	Žarko Marković	7	0	2	0	0	0	3	0	12	0
7	(Kazakhstan)	MF	Zhambyl Kukeyev	1	0	0	0	0	0	0	0	1	0
8	(Russia)	MF	Mikhail Bakayev	4	0	0	0	0	0	1	0	5	0
9	(Kazakhstan)	MF	Bauyrzhan Islamkhan	1	0	0	0	0	0	1	0	2	0
10	(Brazil)	MF	Isael	4	0	1	0	0	0	0	0	5	0
11	(Ivory Coast)	FW	Gerard Gohou	3	0	0	0	0	0	2	0	5	0
14	(Kazakhstan)	MF	Bauyrzhan Baytana	1	0	0	0	0	0	0	0	1	0
15	(Spain)	FW	Sito Riera	4	0	0	0	0	0	2	0	6	0
18	(Kazakhstan)	MF	Vitali Li	2	0	0	0	0	0	0	0	2	0
19	(Kazakhstan)	FW	Stanislav Lunin	1	0	0	0	0	0	1	0	2	0
20	(Kazakhstan)	MF	Islambek Kuat	6	0	0	0	0	0	0	0	6	0
22	(Brazil)	MF	Serginho	2	0	0	0	0	0	0	0	2	0
27	(Kazakhstan)	MF	Ulan Konysbayev	1	0	0	0	0	0	0	0	1	0
28	(Serbia)	FW	Đorđe Despotović	0	0	1	0	0	0	0	0	1	0
29	(Kazakhstan)	FW	Toktar Zhangylyshbay	1	0	0	0	0	0	0	0	1	0
44	(Ukraine)	MF	Anatoliy Tymoshchuk	0	0	0	0	0	0	3	0	4	0
			TOTALS	53	1	6	0	0	0	15	0	74	1
