= 2015 FC Aktobe season =

FC Aktobe
2015 season
- Chairman: Sagat Yensegenuly
- Manager: Vladimir Gazzayev (until 20 July 2015); Ioan Andone (from 20 July 2015)
- Stadium: Central Stadium
- Kazakhstan Premier League: 3rd
- Kazakhstan Cup: Semi Final vs Astana
- Europa League: First Qualifying Round vs Nõmme Kalju
- Top goalscorer: League: Sergei Khizhnichenko (9); All: Sergei Khizhnichenko (9)
Home colours	Away colours

The 2015 FC Aktobe season is the 15th successive season that the club will play in the Kazakhstan Premier League, the highest tier of association football in Kazakhstan. Aktobe will also play in the Kazakhstan Cup and the Europa League.

== Squad ==
As of 28 June 2015

Note: Flags indicate national team as defined under FIFA eligibility rules; some limited exceptions apply. Players may hold more than one non-FIFA nationality.

No.	Pos.	Nation	Player
1	GK	KAZ	Stas Pokatilov
2	DF	NGR	Dele Adeleye
3	DF	KAZ	Valeri Korobkin
4	DF	KAZ	Evgeni Levin
5	MF	LTU	Artūras Žulpa
7	DF	KAZ	Dmitri Miroshnichenko
8	DF	KAZ	Viktor Dmitrenko
10	FW	KAZ	Marat Khairullin
11	FW	BRA	Danilo Neco
12	DF	TTO	Robert Primus
16	GK	KAZ	Almat Bekbaev
17	MF	KAZ	Askhat Tagybergen

No.	Pos.	Nation	Player
20	MF	ROU	Ciprian Deac
23	DF	KAZ	Yuriy Logvinenko
25	DF	KAZ	Sayat Zhumagali
33	FW	KAZ	Rustam Sakhibov
34	FW	ARM	Marcos Pizzelli
35	GK	KAZ	Stanislav Pavlov
55	DF	BRA	Anderson Mineiro
73	MF	KAZ	Didar Zhalmukan
88	MF	KAZ	Alexander Wolf
91	FW	KAZ	Sergei Khizhnichenko
95	FW	KAZ	Abat Aimbetov
99	FW	BRA	Danilo

== Transfers ==
=== Winter ===
In: Note: Flags indicate national team as defined under FIFA eligibility rules; some limited exceptions apply. Players may hold more than one non-FIFA nationality.

No.	Pos.	Nation	Player
1	GK	KAZ	Stas Pokatilov (from (Kazakhstan) Shakhter Karagandy)
3	DF	NGR	Dele Adeleye (from (Greece) OFI)
8	MF	LTU	Artūras Žulpa (from (Lithuania) Žalgiris Vilnius)
91	FW	KAZ	Sergei Khizhnichenko (from (Poland) Korona Kielce)
99	FW	BRA	Danilo (from (Ukraine) Zorya Luhansk)

Out: Note: Flags indicate national team as defined under FIFA eligibility rules; some limited exceptions apply. Players may hold more than one non-FIFA nationality.

No.	Pos.	Nation	Player
3	DF	KAZ	Aleksei Muldarov (to (Kazakhstan) Kaisar)
5	DF	KAZ	Petr Badlo
6	MF	RUS	Taras Tsarikayev
15	DF	ARM	Robert Arzumanyan (to (Russia) Amkar Perm)
25	DF	KAZ	Sayat Zhumagali
55	GK	KAZ	Andrei Sidelnikov (to (Kazakhstan) Ordabasy)
78	FW	BLR	Ihar Zyankovich (to (Turkey) Elazığspor)
80	MF	UZB	Timur Kapadze (to (Uzbekistan) Lokomotiv Tashkent)
96	MF	KAZ	Anuarbek Sadykov
—	DF	KGZ	Emil Kenzhesariev

=== Summer ===
In: Note: Flags indicate national team as defined under FIFA eligibility rules; some limited exceptions apply. Players may hold more than one non-FIFA nationality.

No.	Pos.	Nation	Player
20	MF	ROU	Ciprian Deac (from (Romania) CFR Cluj)

Out: Note: Flags indicate national team as defined under FIFA eligibility rules; some limited exceptions apply. Players may hold more than one non-FIFA nationality.

No.	Pos.	Nation	Player
29	MF	KAZ	Pavel Shabalin (to (Kazakhstan) Okzhetpes)
69	FW	UKR	Oleksiy Antonov (to (Azerbaijan) Gabala)

== Competitions ==
=== Kazakhstan Premier League ===
==== First round ====
===== Results summary =====
Overall								Home						Away					
Pld	W	D	L	GF	GA	GD	Pts	W	D	L	GF	GA	GD	W	D	L	GF	GA	GD
22	12	8	2	27	13	+14	44	5	5	1	14	8	+6	7	3	1	13	5	+8

Last updated: 28 July 2015.
Source: Soccerway

===== Results by round =====
Round	1	2	3	4	5	6	7	8	9	10	11	12	13	14	15	16	17	18	19	20	21	22
Ground	H	H	A	H	A	H	A	H	A	H	A	A	H	A	H	A	H	A	H	A	H	A
Result	D	D	W	D	D	D	W	W	W	W	W	W	W	W	D	D	W	D	W	L	L	W
Position	3	6	5	5	5	5	5	3	3	1	1	1	1	1	1	1	1	1	1	1	1	2

Source: Soccerway
A = Away; H = Home; W = Win; D = Draw; L = Loss

===== Results =====
7 March 2015 1	Aktobe	1 – 1	Atyrau	Aktobe
16:00 (UTC+6)	D.Zhalmukan 63'; Mineiro (yellow card) 66'; Tagybergen (yellow card) 90+3'	Summary	Baizhanov 42'; B.Kasymov (yellow card) 90+2'	Stadium: Central Stadium; Attendance: 3,000; Referee: Denis Tevyashov

11 March 2015 2	Aktobe	0 – 0	Kairat	Aktobe
16:00 (UTC+6)	Tagybergen (yellow card) 39'; Neco (yellow card) 90+2'	Summary		Stadium: Central Stadium; Attendance: 3,000; Referee: Askhat Abdanbayev

15 March 2015 3	Taraz	0 – 1	Aktobe	Taraz
15:00 (UTC+6)		Summary	Khizhnichenko 32'; Mineiro (yellow card) 40'; Miroshnichenko (yellow card) 55'	Stadium: Central Stadium; Attendance: 2,000; Referee: Viktor Antonov

21 March 2015 4	Aktobe	0 – 0	Ordabasy	Aktobe
16:00 (UTC+6)	Žulpa (yellow card) 47'; Tagybergen (yellow card) 77'	Summary	Nurgaliev (yellow card) 44'; Tazhimbetov (yellow card) 61'; B.Beisenov (yellow card) 85'; R.Sariev (yellow card) 86'	Stadium: Central Stadium; Attendance: 3,000; Referee: Artyom Kuchin

5 April 2015 5	Astana	0 – 0	Aktobe	Astana
16:00 (UTC+6)	Konysbayev (yellow card) 41'; Postnikov (yellow card) 49'; Kéthévoama (yellow card) 57'; Cañas (yellow card) 72'	Summary	Žulpa (yellow card) 39'; Khayrullin (yellow card) 45+1'; Shabalin (yellow card) 90+3'	Stadium: Astana Arena; Attendance: 3,000; Referee: Igor Chesnokov

11 April 2015 6	Aktobe	0 – 0	Kaisar	Aktobe
17:00 (UTC+6)		Summary	Muzhikov (yellow card) 60'	Stadium: Central Stadium; Referee: Ruslan Duzmambetov

15 April 2015 7	Tobol	0 – 2	Aktobe	Kostanay
18:00 (UTC+6)	Bogdanov (yellow card) 21'; Sadownichy (yellow card) 38'; Kurgulin (yellow card) 67' (yellow-red card) 71'	Summary	Korobkin (yellow card) 31'; Danilo 42'; Mineiro (yellow card) 58'; Neco (yellow card) 71'; E.Levin (yellow card) 74'; Khizhnichenko 83'	Stadium: Central Stadium; Attendance: 5,000; Referee: Igor Aleshin

19 April 2015 8	Aktobe	2 – 0	Zhetysu	Aktobe
17:00 (UTC+6)	D.Zhalmukan (yellow card) 41' (goal) 75'; E.Levin (yellow card) 57'; Khizhnichenko 65'	Summary	Ergashev (yellow card) 17'	Stadium: Central Stadium; Attendance: 3,000; Referee: Aydin Rakhimbayev

25 April 2015 9	Okzhetpes	2 – 3	Aktobe	Kokshetau
14:00 (UTC+6)	Rotković 46'; Sychev 76'; Buleshev (yellow card) 84'	Summary	Khairullin 23'; Korobkin (yellow card) 59'; Žulpa (yellow card) 66'; Pizzelli 83'; Neco 87'; Mineiro (yellow card) 89'	Stadium: Okzhetpes Stadium; Attendance: 1,500; Referee: Bolat Karlibayev

3 May 2015 10	Aktobe	2 – 1	Irtysh	Aktobe
17:00 (UTC+6)	Danilo (yellow card) 30'; Adeleye 53'; Logvinenko (yellow card) 67'; Tagybergen (yellow card) 77'; Mineiro (yellow card) 82'; Pizzelli 90+3' (pen.)	Summary	Bancé 34'; R.Yesimov (yellow card) 90'; Chernyshov (red card) 90+2'	Stadium: Central Stadium; Referee: Denis Izmailov

7 May 2015 11	Shakhter Karagandy	0 – 1	Aktobe	Karaganda
14:00 (UTC+6)	Pokrivač (yellow card) 3'; Paryvaew (yellow card) 24'; Vošahlík (yellow card) 75'	Summary	Miroshnichenko (yellow card) 24'; Danilo 37'	Stadium: Shakhter Stadium; Attendance: 3,000; Referee: Askhat Abdanbayev

16 May 2015 12	Kairat	1 – 2	Aktobe	Almaty
17:00 (UTC+6)	Islamkhan (yellow card) 33'; Kuat (yellow card) 45'; Pliyev (yellow card) 45'; V.Plotnikov (yellow card) 45'; Bakayev (yellow card) 83'; Gohou 90+2'	Summary	Žulpa (yellow card) 21'; Mineiro (yellow card) 45'; Khizhnichenko 68'; Antonov 73'; Tagybergen (yellow card) 90+1'	Stadium: Central Stadium; Attendance: 12,500; Referee: Artyom Kuchin

24 May 2015 13	Aktobe	3 – 1	Taraz	Aktobe
18:00 (UTC+6)	Aimbetov 19'; Miroshnichenko (yellow card) 58'; Tagybergen (yellow card) 61' (goal) 67'; Dmitrenko (yellow card) 74' (goal) 87'	Summary	D.Evstigneev (yellow card) 8' (goal) 64'; Z.Kozhamberdy (yellow card) 58'	Stadium: Central Stadium; Attendance: 3,000; Referee: Timur Kumashev

29 May 2015 14	Ordabasy	0 – 1	Aktobe	Shymkent
18:00 (UTC+6)	E.Tungyshbaev (yellow card) 32'; Božić (yellow card) 72'; Nurgaliev (yellow card) 81'; Ashirbekov (yellow card) 85'; Malyi (yellow card) 90+1'	Summary	Tagybergen (yellow card) 27'; D.Zhalmukan 49'; Logvinenko (yellow card) 62'; Khairullin (yellow card) 88'	Stadium: Kazhimukan Munaitpasov Stadium; Attendance: 4,000; Referee: Akmalkhan Kholmatov

6 June 2015 15	Aktobe	0 – 0	Astana	Aktobe
19:30 (UTC+6)	Miroshnichenko (yellow card) 21'; Mineiro (red card) 89'; Danilo (yellow card) 90+2'	Summary	Akhmetov (yellow card) 55'; Dzholchiev (yellow card) 59'; Erić (yellow card) 89'; Aničić (yellow card) 89'; Nusserbayev (yellow card) 89'	Stadium: Central Stadium; Attendance: 3,000; Referee: Denis Izmailov

20 June 2015 16	Kaisar	0 – 0	Aktobe	Kyzylorda
19:00 (UTC+6)	Nurdauletov (yellow card) 24'; Irismetov (yellow card) 78'; Klein (yellow card) 80'	Summary	D.Zhalmukan (yellow card) 26'; Dmitrenko (yellow card) 28'; Danilo (red card) 58'; Logvinenko (yellow card) 80'	Stadium: Gany Muratbayev Stadium; Attendance: 2,500; Referee: Artyom Kuchin

24 June 2015 17	Aktobe	2 – 1	Tobol	Aktobe
19:30 (UTC+6)	Miroshnichenko (yellow card) 60'; Pizzelli 77'; Neco 79'; Dmitrenko (yellow card) 90'; D.Zhalmukan (yellow card) 90+1'	Summary	I.Yurin 6'; Klimavičius (yellow card) 38'	Stadium: Central Stadium; Attendance: 3,000; Referee: Bagdat Abdullaev

27 June 2015 18	Zhetysu	1 – 1	Aktobe	Taldykorgan
18:30 (UTC+6)	Ergashev (yellow card) 11'; Turysbek (yellow card) 22' (yellow-red card) 77'; Despotović 65'	Summary	Miroshnichenko (yellow card) 48'; Logvinenko (yellow card) 64'; Korobkin (yellow card) 76'; Pokatilov (yellow card) 77'; D.Zhalmukan 90+1'	Stadium: Zhetysu Stadium; Attendance: 2,000; Referee: Igor Chesnokov

5 July 2015 19	Aktobe	4 – 2	Okzhetpes	Aktobe
20:00 (UTC+6)	Korobkin 48'; Khizhnichenko 50', 64', 84'; Deac (yellow card) 62'; Dmitrenko (yellow card) 77'	Summary	R. Sakhalbayev 20'; Rotkovic 67'	Stadium: Central Stadium; Attendance: 3,000; Referee: Akmalkhan Kholmatov

12 July 2015 20	Irtysh	1 – 0	Aktobe	Pavlodar
19:00 (UTC+6)	Chernyshov (yellow card) 67'; Kislitsyn (yellow card) 80'; Fonseca 90+1'	Summary	Žulpa (yellow card) 30'; D.Zhalmukan (yellow card) 73'; Pizzelli (yellow card) 90+4'	Stadium: Central Stadium; Referee: Artyom Kuchin

19 July 2015 21	Aktobe	0 – 1	Shakhter Karagandy	Aktobe
20:00 (UTC+6)	Aimbetov (yellow card) 84'	Summary	Sass (yellow card) 71'; S.Vetrov 86'; Y.Tarasov (yellow card) 90+5'	Stadium: Central Stadium; Attendance: 8,000; Referee: Askhat Abdanbayev

26 July 2015 22	Atyrau	0 – 2	Aktobe	Atyrau
20:00 (UTC+6)	Tleshev (yellow card) 54'	Summary	Khizhnichenko 10'; Žulpa (yellow card) 20'; Pizzelli 46'; D.Zhalmukan (yellow card) 58'	Stadium: Munaishy Stadium; Attendance: 6,000; Referee: Viktor Antonov

===== League table =====
Pos	Team	Pld	W	D	L	GF	GA	GD	Pts	Qualification
1	Kairat	22	13	5	4	43	14	+29	44	Qualification for the championship round
2	Aktobe	22	12	8	2	27	12	+15	44	Qualification for the championship round
3	Astana	22	12	7	3	40	19	+21	43	Qualification for the championship round
4	Atyrau	22	9	10	3	25	19	+6	37	Qualification for the championship round
5	Ordabasy	22	9	8	5	21	18	+3	35	Qualification for the championship round

Source: UEFA.com, Soccerway
Rules for classification: 1) Points; 2) Matches won; 3) Head-to-head points; 4) Head-to-head matches won; 5) Head-to-head goal difference; 6) Head-to-head goals scored; 7) Head-to-head away goals scored; 8) Goal difference; 9) Goals scored; 10) Away goals scored; 11) Draw.

==== Championship round ====
===== Results summary =====
Overall								Home						Away					
Pld	W	D	L	GF	GA	GD	Pts	W	D	L	GF	GA	GD	W	D	L	GF	GA	GD
10	3	1	6	8	12	−4	10	3	0	2	5	6	−1	0	1	4	3	6	−3

Last updated: 9 November 2015.
Source: Soccerway

===== Results by round =====
Round	1	2	3	4	5	6	7	8	9	10
Ground	H	H	A	H	A	A	H	A	H	A
Result	L	W	L	W	L	L	W	D	L	L
Position	3	3	3	3	3	3	3	3	3	3

Source: Soccerway
A = Away; H = Home; W = Win; D = Draw; L = Loss

===== Results =====
13 August 2015 23	Aktobe	0 – 1	Astana	Aktobe
20:00 (UTC+6)	Tagybergen (yellow card) 51'; Korobkin (yellow card) 77'	Summary	Zhukov (yellow card) 27'; Shomko (yellow card) 65'; Cañas 81'	Stadium: Central Stadium; Attendance: 12,000; Referee: Igor Aleshin

23 August 2015 24	Aktobe	1 – 0	Ordabasy	Aktobe
20:30 (UTC+6)	Dmitrenko (yellow card) 26'; Deac 53' (pen.); Miroshnichenko (yellow card) 56'; Neco (yellow card) 63'; Logvinenko (yellow card) 83'	Summary	Geynrikh (yellow card) 23'	Stadium: Central Stadium; Attendance: 11,000; Referee: Denis Izmailov

12 September 2015 25	Irtysh	1 – 0	Aktobe	Pavlodar
17:00 (UTC+6)	N'Diaye (yellow card) 67'; Geteriev 83'	Summary	Adeleye (yellow card) 13'	Stadium: Central Stadium; Attendance: 3,200; Referee: Bolat Karlibayev

20 September 2015 26	Aktobe	1 – 0	Atyrau	Aktobe
17:00 (UTC+6)	Danilo 71'; Deac (yellow card) 82'	Summary	Odibe (yellow card) 53'; Essame (yellow card) 90+4'	Stadium: Central Stadium; Attendance: 7,800; Referee: Aydin Rakhimbayev

27 September 2015 27	Kairat	2 – 1	Aktobe	Almaty
18:00 (UTC+6)	Isael 10'; Gohou 13' (yellow card) 67'; Soares (yellow card) 25'	Summary	Mineiro (yellow card) 17'; Korobkin (yellow card) 55'; Danilo 59'; Logvinenko (red card) 60'; Miroshnichenko (yellow card) 63'	Stadium: Central Stadium; Attendance: 11,000; Referee: Viktor Antonov

3 October 2015 28	Ordabasy	2 – 1	Aktobe	Shymkent
15:00 (UTC+6)	Junuzović 39'; G.Suyumbaev (yellow card) 67'; Simčević 90+4'	Summary	Khizhnichenko (yellow card) 15' (goal) 57'; Žulpa (yellow card) 22'; Dmitrenko (yellow card) 81'	Stadium: Kazhymukan Munaitpasov Stadium; Attendance: 2,300; Referee: Askhat Abdanbayev

17 October 2015 29	Aktobe	3 – 2	Irtysh	Aktobe
17:00 (UTC+6)	Pizzelli (yellow card) 45+1' (goal) 49'; Khizhnichenko (yellow card) 53'; Danilo 59', 90+3'	Summary	Smakov (yellow card) 14' (goal) 65' (pen.); Dudchenko 69'	Stadium: Central Stadium; Attendance: 8,000; Referee: Denis Izmailov

24 October 2015 30	Atyrau	1 – 1	Aktobe	Atyrau
17:00 (UTC+6)	Diakate 28'	Summary	Dmitrenko 15'; Khizhnichenko (yellow card) 74'; Adeleye (yellow card) 87'	Stadium: Munaishy Stadium; Attendance: 1,700; Referee: Denis Tevyashov

31 October 2015 31	Aktobe	0 – 3	Kairat	Aktobe
15:00 (UTC+6)	Žulpa (yellow card) 50'; Logvinenko (yellow card) 59'; Mineiro (yellow card) 81'	Summary	Konysbayev (yellow card) 12'; Serginho 53' (pen.), 85'; Kuat (yellow card) 58'; Marković (yellow card) 61'; T.Rudoselskiy (yellow card) 73'; Despotović 88'	Stadium: Central Stadium; Attendance: 8,000; Referee: Artyom Kuchin

8 November 2015 32	Astana	1 – 0	Aktobe	Astana
15:00 (UTC+6)	Zhukov (yellow card) 20'; Kabananga 88'	Summary	D.Zhalmukan (yellow card) 27'; Adeleye (yellow card) 53'; Mineiro (yellow card) 60'; Korobkin (yellow card) 60'; Khizhnichenko (red card) 85'	Stadium: Astana Arena; Attendance: 8,200; Referee: Viktor Antonov

===== League table =====
Pos	Team	Pld	W	D	L	GF	GA	GD	Pts	Qualification
1	Astana (C)	32	20	7	5	55	26	+29	46	Qualification for the Champions League second qualifying round
2	Kairat	32	20	7	5	60	19	+41	45	Qualification for the Europa League first qualifying round (Note: Kairat qualified for the UEFA Europa League first qualifying round by winning the 2015 Kazakhstan Cup.)
3	Aktobe	32	15	9	8	35	25	+10	32	Qualification for the Europa League first qualifying round
4	Ordabasy	32	12	10	10	32	31	+1	29	Qualification for the Europa League first qualifying round
5	Atyrau	32	11	12	9	31	33	−2	27	
6	Irtysh Pavlodar	32	10	10	12	37	39	−2	25	

Source: Soccerway
Rules for classification: 1) Points; 2) Play-off (only if deciding champion when two teams are tied); 3) Matches won; 4) Head-to-head points; 5) Head-to-head matches won; 6) Head-to-head goal difference; 7) Head-to-head goals scored; 8) Head-to-head away goals scored; 9) Goal difference; 10) Goals scored; 11) Away goals scored; 12) Play-off (only if deciding champion when three or teams are tied); 13) Draw.
(C) Champions

=== Kazakhstan Cup ===
29 April 2015 Second Round	Akzhayik	0 – 5	Aktobe	Oral
18:00 (UTC+6)		Summary	Korobkin 11'; D.Zhalmukan 21', 46'; Dmitrenko 42'; Antonov 78'	Stadium: Petr Atoyan Stadium; Attendance: 2,500; Referee: Timur Kumashev

20 May 2015 Quarter Final	Okzhetpes	2 – 3	Aktobe	Kokshetau
18:00 (UTC+6)	Rotković 25' (pen.); Azovskiy 90'	Report	Pizzelli 20'; Pokatilov (yellow card) 24'; Žulpa 41' (yellow card) 81'; Neco 45+1'; Dmitrenko (yellow card) 49'	Stadium: Okzhetpes Stadium; Attendance: 3,000; Referee: Ruslan Duzmambetov

2 June 2015 Semi Final 2nd leg	Aktobe	0 – 2	Astana	Aktobe
19:00 (UTC+6)	Tagybergen (yellow card) 28'	Summary	Dzholchiev 19'; B.Kulbekov 33'; Twumasi (yellow card) 72'; Shomko (yellow card) 90+1'	Stadium: Central Stadium; Attendance: 3,000; Referee: Igor Aleshin

23 September 2015 Semi Final 2nd leg	Astana	1 – 1 (3 – 1 agg.)	Aktobe	Astana
18:00 (UTC+6)	Shomko (yellow card) 66'; Twumasi 68'	Summary	Mineiro (yellow card) 35'; Khizhnichenko 40'	Stadium: Astana Arena; Attendance: 4,500; Referee: Ruslan Duzmambetov

=== UEFA Europa League ===
==== Qualifying rounds ====
2 July 2015 First qualifying round 1st leg	Aktobe (Kazakhstan)	0 – 1	(Estonia) Nõmme Kalju	Aktobe, Kazakhstan
22:00 (UTC+6)	Danilo (yellow card) 19'; Žulpa (yellow card) 69'; Pokatilov (red card) 77'	Report	Bärengrub (yellow card) 21'; Rodrigues (yellow card) 27'; Kallaste (yellow card) 44'; Puri (yellow card) 63'; Purje 72'	Stadium: Central Stadium; Attendance: 10,870; Referee: Yuriy Mozharovskyy (Ukraine)

9 July 2015 First qualifying round 2nd leg	Nõmme Kalju (Estonia)	0 – 0 (1 – 0 agg.)	(Kazakhstan) Aktobe	Tallinn, Estonia
22:00 (UTC+6)	Wakui (yellow card) 4'; Purje (yellow card) 59'; Puri (yellow card) 90+2'	Report	Korobkin (yellow card) 67'; Khairullin (yellow card) 79'	Stadium: Hiiu Stadium; Attendance: 844; Referee: Danilo Grujić (Serbia)

== Squad statistics ==
As of Match played 8 November 2015

=== Appearances and goals ===
No.	Pos	Nat	Player	Total		Premier League		Kazakhstan Cup		UEFA Europa League	
No.	Pos	Nat	Player	Apps	Goals	Apps	Goals	Apps	Goals	Apps	Goals
1	GK	(Kazakhstan) KAZ	Stas Pokatilov	37	0	32	0	4	0	1	0
2	DF	(Nigeria) NGR	Dele Adeleye	34	1	29	1	3	0	2	0
3	DF	(Kazakhstan) KAZ	Valeri Korobkin	29	2	25+2	1	1	1	1	0
4	DF	(Kazakhstan) KAZ	Evgeni Levin	16	0	12+2	0	2	0	0	0
5	MF	(Lithuania) LTU	Artūras Žulpa	35	1	29+1	0	3	1	2	0
7	DF	(Kazakhstan) KAZ	Dmitri Miroshnichenko	21	0	15+2	0	2	0	2	0
8	DF	(Kazakhstan) KAZ	Viktor Dmitrenko	20	3	12+4	2	3	1	1	0
10	FW	(Kazakhstan) KAZ	Marat Khairullin	26	1	13+7	1	4	0	1+1	0
11	FW	(Brazil) BRA	Danilo Neco	28	2	18+6	2	1+1	0	2	0
16	GK	(Kazakhstan) KAZ	Almat Bekbaev	2	0	0	0	0	0	1+1	0
17	MF	(Kazakhstan) KAZ	Askhat Tagybergen	30	1	21+5	1	4	0	0	0
20	MF	(Romania) ROU	Ciprian Deac	18	1	13+2	1	0+1	0	2	0
23	DF	(Kazakhstan) KAZ	Yuri Logvinenko	33	0	27	0	3+1	0	2	0
25	DF	(Kazakhstan) KAZ	Sayat Zhumagali	1	0	1	0	0	0	0	0
33	FW	(Kazakhstan) KAZ	Rustam Sakhibov	2	0	0+2	0	0	0	0	0
34	FW	(Armenia) ARM	Marcos Pizzelli	32	6	17+10	5	2+1	1	2	0
55	DF	(Brazil) BRA	Anderson Mineiro	26	0	23	0	3	0	0	0
73	MF	(Kazakhstan) KAZ	Didar Zhalmukan	35	6	20+9	4	3+1	2	0+2	0
88	MF	(Kazakhstan) KAZ	Alexander Wolf	2	0	0+2	0	0	0	0	0
91	FW	(Kazakhstan) KAZ	Sergei Khizhnichenko	33	10	18+9	9	2+2	1	1+1	0
95	FW	(Kazakhstan) KAZ	Abat Aimbetov	24	1	12+11	1	1	0	0	0
99	FW	(Brazil) BRA	Danilo	28	7	14+9	6	3	1	2	0
Players away from Aktobe on loan:
Players who appeared for Aktobe that left during the season:
29	MF	(Kazakhstan) KAZ	Pavel Shabalin	5	0	1+3	0	1	0	0	0
69	FW	(Ukraine) UKR	Oleksiy Antonov	5	2	0+3	1	0+2	1	0	0

=== Goal scorers ===
Place	Position	Nation	Number	Name	Premier League	Kazakhstan Cup	Kazakhstan Super Cup	UEFA Europa League	Total
1	FW	(Kazakhstan)	91	Sergei Khizhnichenko	9	1	0	0	10
2	FW	(Brazil)	99	Danilo	6	1	0	0	7
3	FW	(Armenia)	34	Marcos Pizzelli	5	1	0	0	6
3	MF	(Kazakhstan)	73	Didar Zhalmukan	4	2	0	0	6
5	DF	(Kazakhstan)	8	Viktor Dmitrenko	2	1	0	0	3
6	FW	(Brazil)	11	Danilo Neco	2	0	0	0	2
6	FW	(Ukraine)	69	Oleksiy Antonov	1	1	0	0	2
6	DF	(Kazakhstan)	3	Valeri Korobkin	1	1	0	0	2
9	FW	(Kazakhstan)	10	Marat Khairullin	1	0	0	0	1
9	DF	(Nigeria)	2	Dele Adeleye	1	0	0	0	1
9	FW	(Kazakhstan)	95	Abat Aimbetov	1	0	0	0	1
9	MF	(Kazakhstan)	17	Askhat Tagybergen	1	0	0	0	1
9	MF	(Romania)	20	Ciprian Deac	1	0	0	0	1
9	MF	(Lithuania)	5	Artūras Žulpa	0	1	0	0	1
				TOTALS	35	9	0	0	44

=== Disciplinary record ===
Number	Nation	Position	Name	Premier League		Kazakhstan Cup		Kazakhstan Super Cup		UEFA Europa League		Total	
Number	Nation	Position	Name	Yellow card	Red card	Yellow card	Red card	Yellow card	Red card	Yellow card	Red card	Yellow card	Red card
1	(Kazakhstan)	GK	Stas Pokatilov	1	0	1	0	0	0	0	1	2	1
2	(Nigeria)	DF	Dele Adeleye	3	0	0	0	0	0	0	0	3	0
3	(Kazakhstan)	DF	Valeri Korobkin	6	0	0	0	0	0	1	0	7	0
4	(Kazakhstan)	DF	Evgeni Levin	2	0	0	0	0	0	0	0	2	0
5	(Lithuania)	MF	Artūras Žulpa	8	0	1	0	0	0	1	0	10	0
7	(Kazakhstan)	DF	Dmitri Miroshnichenko	0	0	0	0	0	0	0	8	0	
8	(Kazakhstan)	DF	Viktor Dmitrenko	6	0	1	0	0	0	0	0	7	0
10	(Kazakhstan)	MF	Marat Khairullin	2	0	0	0	0	0	1	0	3	0
11	(Brazil)	FW	Danilo Neco	2	0	0	0	0	0	0	0	2	0
17	(Kazakhstan)	MF	Askhat Tagybergen	8	0	1	0	0	0	0	0	9	0
20	(Romania)	MF	Ciprian Deac	2	0	0	0	0	0	0	0	2	0
23	(Ukraine)	DF	Yuriy Logvinenko	6	1	0	0	0	0	0	0	6	1
29	(Kazakhstan)	MF	Pavel Shabalin	1	0	0	0	0	0	0	0	1	0
34	(Armenia)	FW	Marcos Pizzelli	2	0	0	0	0	0	0	0	2	0
55	(Brazil)	DF	Anderson Mineiro	9	1	1	0	0	0	0	0	10	1
73	(Kazakhstan)	MF	Didar Zhalmukan	6	0	0	0	0	0	0	0	6	0
91	(Kazakhstan)	FW	Sergei Khizhnichenko	3	1	0	0	0	0	0	0	3	1
95	(Kazakhstan)	FW	Abat Aimbetov	1	0	0	0	0	0	0	0	1	0
99	(Brazil)	FW	Danilo	2	1	0	0	0	0	1	0	3	1
			TOTALS	78	4	5	0	0	0	4	1	87	5
