= Dele Adeleye =

Nigerian footballer (born 1988)

Personal information
- Full name: Ayodele Adeleye
- Date of birth: 25 December 1988 (age 37)
- Place of birth: Lagos, Nigeria
- Height: 1.89 m (6 ft 2 in)
- Position: Defender

Senior career*
Years	Team	Apps	(Gls)
2005–2006	Shooting Stars		
2007–2010	Sparta Rotterdam	72	(3)
2010–2011	Metalurh Donetsk	26	(3)
2011–2013	Tavriya Simferopol	20	(1)
2013	Kuban Krasnodar	0	(0)
2013–2014	Anzhi Makhachkala	9	(0)
2014	Ergotelis	8	(0)
2014–2015	OFI	14	(0)
2015	Aktobe	29	(1)
2018	SKA-Khabarovsk	2	(0)
Total		180	(8)

International career
2005	Nigeria U-20	3	(0)
2007–2008	Nigeria U-23	6	(0)
2009–2011	Nigeria	10	(0)
Medal record
Representing Nigeria
Men's Football
Silver medal – second place	2008 Beijing	Team competition
- * Club domestic league appearances and goals

Ayodele "Dele" Adeleye (born 25 December 1988) is a Nigerian former professional footballer who played as a centre-back.

== Club career ==
Adeleye is a defender who was born in Lagos and made his debut in professional football as part of the Shooting Stars FC squad before joining Sparta Rotterdam. Reports had linked him to English Premier League clubs Everton, West Ham United and Blackburn Rovers. After Sparta's relegation Adeleye went to FC Metalurh Donetsk on a free transfer in June 2010. On 2 September 2011: Tavria have officially announced the signing of two Nigerian international players – Dele Adeleye and Sani Kaita- through a statement on their official website, FC Tavria, Dele Adeleye, in the Nigeria squad for two live-wire games against Madagascar on Sunday, comes from Donetsk Metallurg, where he scored three goals in 26 appearances from central defense. In August 2013, Adeleye signed for Anzhi Makhachkala. In January 2014 Adeleye moved to Greek side Ergotelis on a Five-month contract, with the option of another year.

In February 2015, Adeleye signed a two-year-contract with Kazakhstan Premier League side FC Aktobe. Following the conclusion of the 2015 season, Adeleye was transfer listed by Aktobe.

On 20 February 2018, after two years of free agency, he joined Russian club FC SKA-Khabarovsk. He only made two appearances for the club, before leaving again as the club were relegated Russian First League and eventually retired from football.

== International career ==
A tall central defender, Adeleye caught the eye of Sparta when playing 3 matches for the Nigeria U-20 at the 2005 FIFA Youth World Cup in the Netherlands. He made his first senior cap in a friendly against Ireland on 29 May 2009.

== Career statistics ==
=== Club ===
Appearances and goals by club, season and competition
Club	Season	League			National Cup		League Cup		Continental		Other		Total	
Club	Season	Division	Apps	Goals	Apps	Goals	Apps	Goals	Apps	Goals	Apps	Goals	Apps	Goals
Sparta Rotterdam	2006–07	Eredivisie	5	1			–		–		–		5	1
Sparta Rotterdam	2007–08	Eredivisie	22	0			–		–		–		22	0
Sparta Rotterdam	2008–09	Eredivisie	17	2			–		–		–		17	2
Sparta Rotterdam	2009–10	Eredivisie	28	1	2	0	–		–		3	0	33	1
Sparta Rotterdam	Total		72	4	2	0	-	-	-	-	3	0	77	4
Metalurh Donetsk	2010–11	Ukrainian Premier League	26	3	1	0	–		–		–		27	3
Metalurh Donetsk	2011–12	Ukrainian Premier League	0	0	0	0	–		–		–		0	0
Metalurh Donetsk	Total		26	3	1	0	-	-	-	-	-	-	27	3
Tavriya Simferopol	2011–12	Ukrainian Premier League	18	1	1	0	–		–		–		19	1
Tavriya Simferopol	2012–13	Ukrainian Premier League	2	0	0	0	–		–		–		2	0
Tavriya Simferopol	Total		20	1	1	0	-	-	-	-	-	-	21	1
Kuban Krasnodar	2012–13	Russian Premier League	0	0	0	0	–		–		–		0	0
Anzhi Makhachkala	2013–14	Russian Premier League	9	0	0	0	–		4	0	–		13	0
Ergotelis	2013–14	Super League	8	0	0	0	–		–		–		8	0
OFI	2014–15	Super League	14	0	2	0	–		–		–		16	0
Aktobe	2015	Kazakhstan Premier League	29	1	3	0	–		2	0	–		34	1
SKA-Khabarovsk	2017–18	Russian Premier League	2	0	0	0	–		–		–		2	0
Career total			180	9	9	0	-	-	6	0	3	0	198	9

=== International ===
As of match played 15 November 2011.

National team	Year	Apps	Goals
Nigeria	2009	5	0
Nigeria	2010	2	0
Nigeria	2011	3	0
Total		10	0
