= Dmitry Miroshnichenko =

Kazakhstani footballer

Personal information
- Full name: Dmitry Andreyevich Miroshnichenko
- Date of birth: 26 February 1992 (age 34)
- Place of birth: Aktobe, Kazakhstan
- Height: 1.83 m (6 ft 0 in)
- Position: Defender

Team information
- Current team: Kyzylzhar
- Number: 77

Senior career*
Years	Team	Apps	(Gls)
2009–2010	Kuban Krasnodar	0	(0)
2011–2015	Aktobe	70	(4)
2016–2022	Tobol	145	(7)
2022–2023	Chernomorets Novorossiysk	14	(0)
2023	Ufa	6	(1)
2023–2024	Spartak Kostroma	4	(0)
2024	Okzhetpes	27	(4)
2025–	Kyzylzhar	11	(0)

International career^{‡}
2014–	Kazakhstan	11	(0)
- * Club domestic league appearances and goals as of 2 November 2025 ‡ National team caps and goals as of 28 September 2022

Dmitry Andreyevich Miroshnichenko (Russian: Дмитрий Андреевич Мирошниченко; born 26 February 1992) is a Kazakh footballer who plays as a defender for Kyzylzhar.

== Career ==
In January 2016, Miroshnichenko moved from FC Aktobe to FC Tobol. On 12 January 2020, Miroshnichenko renewed his contract with Tobol until the end of 2020.

== Career statistics ==
=== Club ===
As of match played 25 September 2022

Appearances and goals by club, season and competition
Club	Season	League			National Cup		Continental		Other		Total	
Club	Season	Division	Apps	Goals	Apps	Goals	Apps	Goals	Apps	Goals	Apps	Goals
Aktobe	2011	Kazakhstan Premier League	3	0	0	0	0	0	–		8	0
Aktobe	2012	Kazakhstan Premier League	2	0	0	0	0	0	–		0	0
Aktobe	2013	Kazakhstan Premier League	22	2	1	0	1	0	–		4	0
Aktobe	2014	Kazakhstan Premier League	26	2	4	0	6	0	1	0	37	0
Aktobe	2015	Kazakhstan Premier League	17	0	2	0	2	0	–		21	0
Aktobe	Total		70	4	7	0	9	0	1	0	87	4
Tobol	2016	Kazakhstan Premier League	30	0	0	0	-		-		30	0
Tobol	2017	Kazakhstan Premier League	22	0	1	0	-		-		23	0
Tobol	2018	Kazakhstan Premier League	30	1	2	0	4	0	-		36	1
Tobol	2019	Kazakhstan Premier League	24	2	1	0	1	0	-		26	2
Tobol	2020	Kazakhstan Premier League	16	1	-		0	0	-		16	1
Tobol	2021	Kazakhstan Premier League	17	3	2	0	1	0	2	0	22	3
Tobol	2022	Kazakhstan Premier League	6	0	0	0	0	0	-		6	0
Tobol	Total		145	7	6	0	6	0	2	0	159	7
Chernomorets Novorossiysk	2022–23	Russian Second League	4	0	0	0	–		–		4	0
Career total			219	11	13	0	15	0	3	0	250	11

=== International ===
Kazakhstan
Year	Apps	Goals
2014	5	0
2015	0	0
2016	0	0
2017	2	0
2018	1	0
2019	2	0
2020	1	0
Total	11	0

Statistics accurate as of match played 18 November 2020
