= Artūras Žulpa =

Lithuanian footballer

Personal information
- Date of birth: 10 June 1990 (age 36)
- Place of birth: Vilnius, Lithuania
- Height: 1.88 m (6 ft 2 in)
- Position: Midfielder

Team information
- Current team: TransINVEST
- Number: 44

Senior career*
Years	Team	Apps	(Gls)
2007–2008	Vilnius	4	(0)
2009–2010	Vėtra	10	(1)
2010–2012	Kruoja Pakruojis	66	(15)
2013–2014	Žalgiris Vilnius	57	(3)
2015	Aktobe	30	(0)
2016–2019	Tobol	107	(6)
2020	Zhetysu	12	(1)
2021	Siena	1	(0)
2021–2023	Aktobe	44	(1)
2024–	TransINVEST	60	(1)

International career^{‡}
2010–2012	Lithuania U21	22	(2)
2013–	Lithuania	38	(1)
- * Club domestic league appearances and goals as of 2 March 2026 ‡ National team caps and goals as of 19:57, 10 November 2019 (UTC)

Artūras Žulpa (born 10 June 1990) is a Lithuanian footballer who plays for TransINVEST as a midfielder.

== Career ==
=== Club ===
On 27 December 2014, Žulpa signed a three-year contract with FC Aktobe. Following the conclusion of the 2015 season, Žulpa was transfer listed by Aktobe.

==== Tobol ====
In January 2016, Žulpa signed for FC Tobol, signing a new one-year contract with Tobol on 17 January 2018, and another one-year contract on 18 January 2019. On 5 January 2020, Tobol announced the departure of Žulpa from the club.

==== Siena ====
Žulpa started the 2020–21 season with Italian Serie D fallen giants Siena, following the club's refoundation by an Armenian businessgroup. However, he was released in March 2021 after having played only once with the Tuscanians.

==== Aktobe ====
On 14 April 2021, FC Aktobe announced the return of Žulpa.

== Career statistics ==
=== Club ===
As of match played 10 November 2019

Appearances and goals by club, season and competition
Club	Season	League			National Cup		Continental		Other		Total	
Club	Season	Division	Apps	Goals	Apps	Goals	Apps	Goals	Apps	Goals	Apps	Goals
Aktobe	2015	Kazakhstan Premier League	30	0	3	1	2	0	–		35	1
Tobol	2016	Kazakhstan Premier League	23	3	1	0	–		–		24	3
Tobol	2017	Kazakhstan Premier League	24	1	1	0	–		–		25	1
Tobol	2018	Kazakhstan Premier League	31	0	2	0	4	0	–		37	0
Tobol	2019	Kazakhstan Premier League	30	2	3	1	2	0	–		35	3
Tobol	Total		108	6	7	1	6	0	-	-	121	7
Zhetysu	2020	Kazakhstan Premier League	14	1	0	0	–		–		14	1
Siena	2020–21	Serie D	1	0	0	0	–		–		1	0
Aktobe	2021	Kazakhstan Premier League	1	0	0	0	–		–		1	0
Career total			154	7	10	2	8	0	-	-	172	9

=== International ===
Lithuania
Year	Apps	Goals
2013	1	0
2014	7	0
2015	6	0
2016	7	0
2017	3	0
2018	9	1
2019	5	0
Total	38	1

Statistics accurate as of match played 14 October 2019

=== International goals ===
Scores and results list Lithuania's goal tally first.

#	Date	Venue	Opponent	Score	Result	Competition
1.	11 October 2018	LFF Stadium, Vilnius, Lithuania	Romania	1–1	1–2	2018–19 UEFA Nations League C
