= Bruno Soares (footballer) =

Brazilian footballer (born 1988)

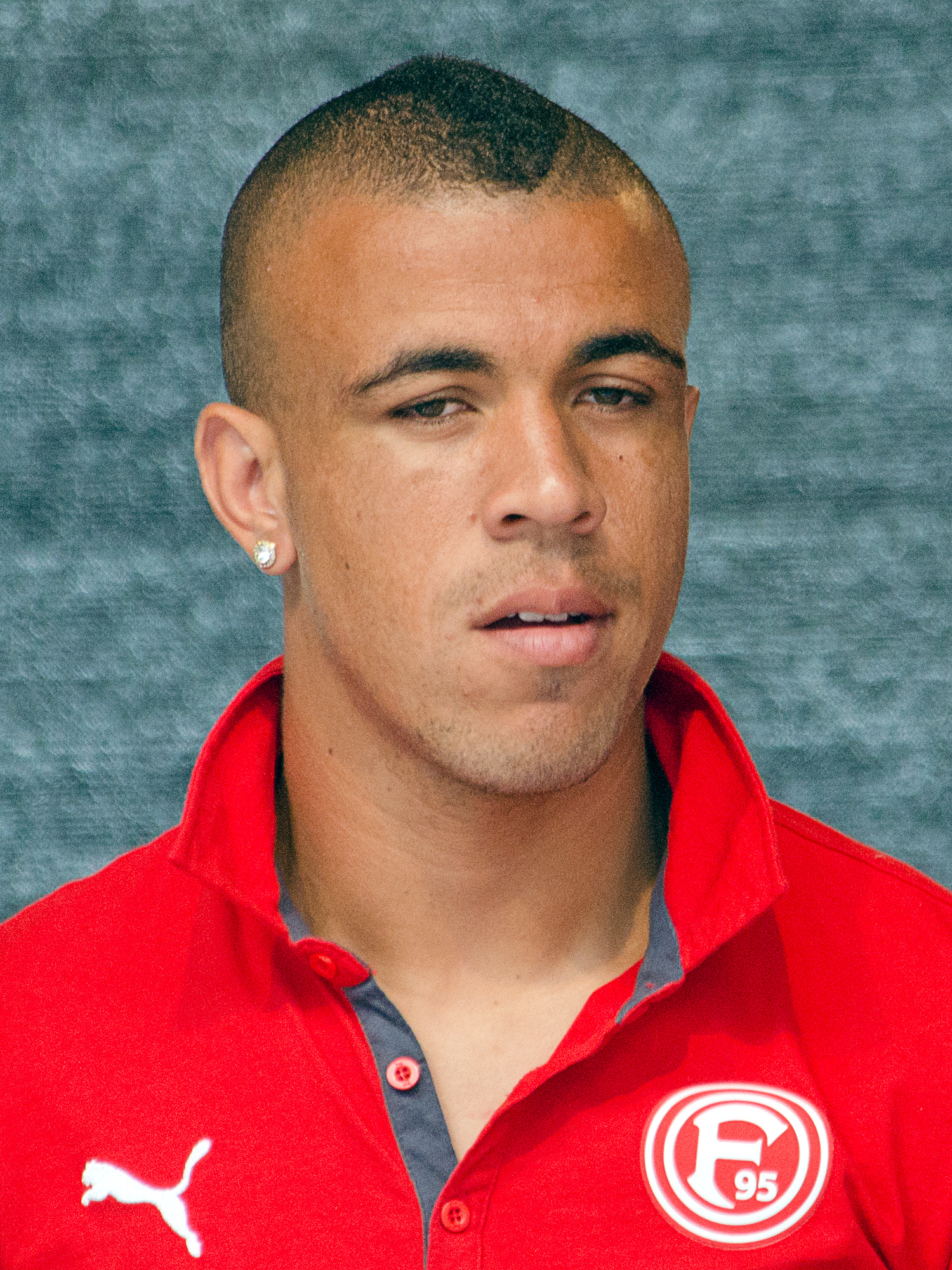
- Soares with Fortuna Düsseldorf in 2014

Personal information
- Full name: Bruno Gabriel Soares
- Date of birth: 21 August 1988 (age 38)
- Place of birth: Belo Horizonte, Brazil
- Height: 1.94 m (6 ft 4 in)
- Position: Centre-back

Team information
- Current team: Rot Weiss Ahlen
- Number: 14

Senior career*
Years	Team	Apps	(Gls)
2007–2008	Coritiba		
2008	→ Toledo (loan)		
2008	Nacional de Rolândia		
2008–2009	Paraná		
2009–2012	MSV Duisburg	76	(4)
2012–2015	Fortuna Düsseldorf	44	(1)
2015–2017	Kairat	27	(1)
2017	Haugesund	2	(0)
2017	Hapoel Tel Aviv	13	(0)
2018–2019	Johor Darul Ta'zim II	15	(1)
2020–2021	WSG Tirol	20	(0)
2021	FC Saarbrücken	0	(0)
2022–2023	HK	19	(3)
2023–2024	SV Meppen	36	(4)
2024–	Rot Weiss Ahlen	40	(4)
- * Club domestic league appearances and goals as of 09:58, 19 December 2025 (UTC)

Bruno Gabriel Soares (born 21 August 1988) is a Brazilian professional footballer who plays as a centre-back for German Oberliga Westfalen club Rot Weiss Ahlen.

== Career ==
Soares was born in Belo Horizonte. He joined Duisburg in the summer of 2009, after he spent his youth and first years as a senior playing in Brazil.

In summer 2012, Soares joined newly promoted Fortuna Düsseldorf and signed a contract until 30 June 2015.

On 23 June 2015, Soares signed a three-year contract with Kazakhstan Premier League side FC Kairat. Despite being linked with a loan move to Ordabsay at the start of 2017, Soares left Kairat before the start of the 2017 season, becoming a free agent, eventually signing for Eliteserien side Haugesund. Soares left Haugesund by mutual consent on 3 July 2017, signing with Hapoel Tel Aviv shortly after.

On 24 December 2017, Soares was announced as a new signing for Malaysia Super League club Johor Darul Ta'zim. Initially brought in to played for senior team, but after poor performance during AFC Champions league play off against Muangthong he had been demoted to the JDTII.

On 7 July 2021, Soares joined 3. Liga side FC Saarbrücken on a one-year contract. However, his contract with FC Saarbrücken was terminated on 15 July due to residency issues.

On 31 January 2023, Soares returned to Germany and signed with SV Meppen in 3. Liga until the end of the season. On 16 August 2023, after waiting for his work permit and residence permit, SV Meppen announced that they had extended the contract with Soares.

On 28 June 2024, Soares joined recently relegated Oberliga Westfalen club Rot Weiss Ahlen on a two-year contract.

== Career statistics ==
As of match played 14 December 2025

Appearances and goals by club, season and competition
Club	Season	League			National cup		League cup		Continental		Other		Total	
Club	Season	Division	Apps	Goals	Apps	Goals	Apps	Goals	Apps	Goals	Apps	Goals	Apps	Goals
MSV Duisburg	2009–10	2. Bundesliga	6	1	1	0	—		—		—		7	1
MSV Duisburg	2010–11	2. Bundesliga	30	1	5	0	—		—		—		35	1
MSV Duisburg	2011–12	2. Bundesliga	32	2	2	0	—		—		—		34	2
MSV Duisburg	Total		68	4	8	0	—		—		—		76	4
Fortuna Düsseldorf	2012–13	Bundesliga	0	0	0	0	—		—		—		0	0
Fortuna Düsseldorf	2013–14	2. Bundesliga	20	0	0	0	—		—		—		20	0
Fortuna Düsseldorf	2014–15	2. Bundesliga	23	1	1	0	—		—		—		24	1
Fortuna Düsseldorf	Total		43	1	1	0	—		—		—		44	1
Kairat	2015	Kazakhstan Premier League	14	0	2	0	—		8	0	—		24	0
Kairat	2016	Kazakhstan Premier League	2	0	0	0	—		0	0	1	0	3	0
Kairat	Total		16	1	2	0	—		8	0	1	0	27	1
Haugesund	2017	Eliteserien	0	0	2	0	—		—		—		2	0
Hapoel Tel Aviv	2017–18	Israeli Premier League	13	0	0	0	0	0	—		—		13	0
Johor Darul Ta'zim	2018	Malaysia Super League	0	0	0	0	0	0	1	0	—		1	0
WSG Tirol	2019–20	Austrian Bundesliga	10	0	1	0	—		—		—		11	0
WSG Tirol	2020–21	Austrian Bundesliga	10	0	0	0	—		—		—		10	0
WSG Tirol	Total		20	0	1	0	—		—		—		21	0
FC Saarbrucken	2021–22	3. Liga	0	0	0	0	—		—		—		0	0
HK	2022	1. deild karla	19	3	1	0	—		—		—		20	3
SV Meppen	2022–23	3. Liga	13	2	0	0	—		—		—		13	2
SV Meppen	2023–24	Regionalliga Nord	23	2	0	0	—		—		3 (Note: Appearances in Lower Saxony Cup)	0	25	2
SV Meppen	Total		36	4	0	0	—		—		3	0	39	4
Rot Weiss Ahlen	2024–25	Oberliga Westfalen	31	2	—		—		—		2 (Note: Appearances in Westphalian Cup)	1	33	3
Rot Weiss Ahlen	2025–26	Oberliga Westfalen	9	2	—		—		—		1	0	10	2
Rot Weiss Ahlen	Total		40	4	—		—		—		3	1	43	5
Career total			255	17	15	0	0	0	9	0	7	1	286	18
