= Valery Korobkin =

Kazakhstani Professional Footballer

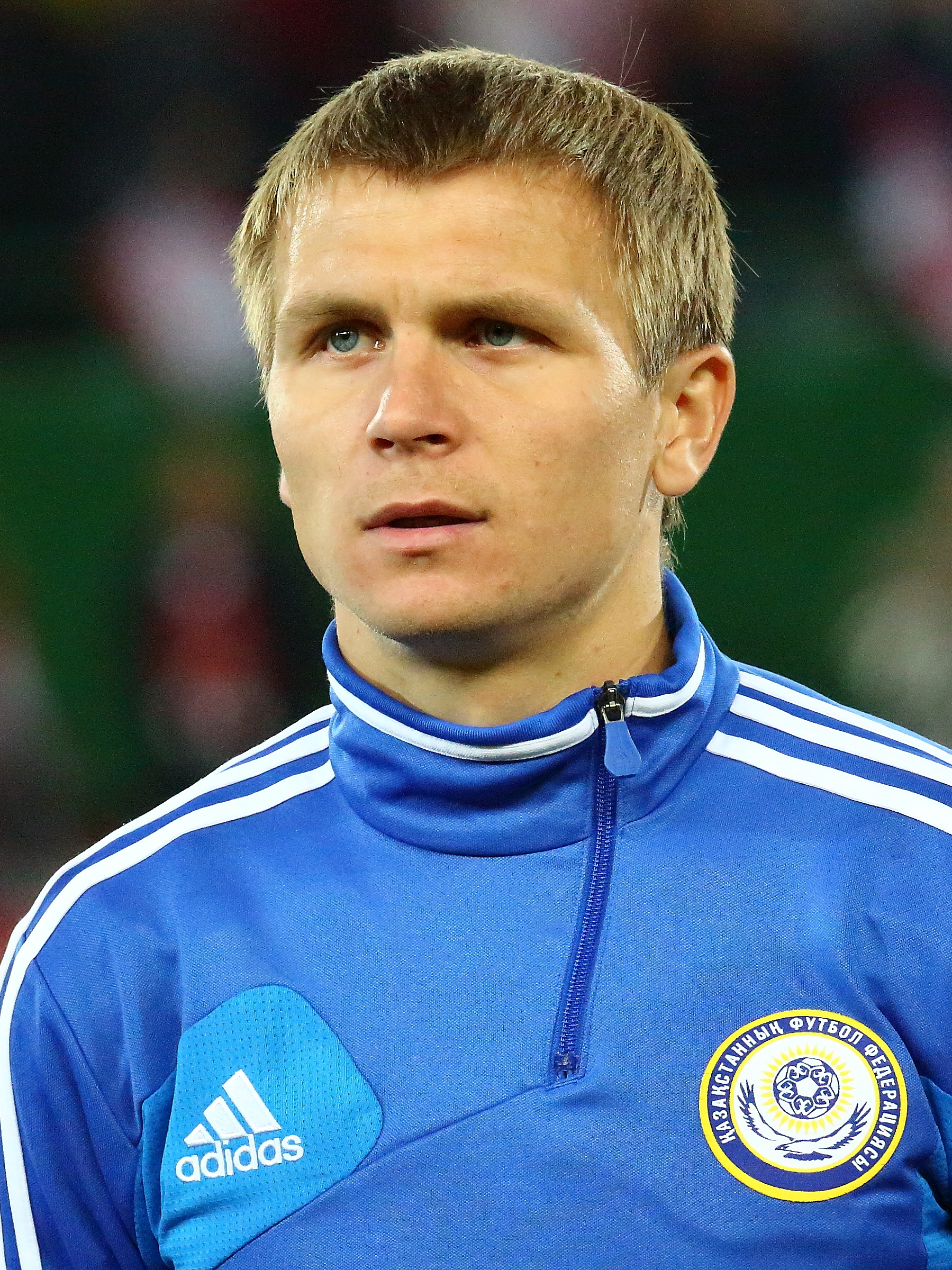
- Korobkin in 2012

Personal information
- Full name: Valery Aleksandrovich Korobkin
- Date of birth: 2 July 1984 (age 42)
- Place of birth: Volgograd, USSR
- Height: 1.83 m (6 ft 0 in)
- Positions: Midfielder; defender

Senior career*
Years	Team	Apps	(Gls)
2001–2002	Rotor Volgograd	0	(0)
2002	→ Torpedo Volzhsky (loan)	15	(0)
2004	Rotor-2 Volgograd	28	(1)
2005–2006	Rotor Volgograd	17	(0)
2006–2007	Metallurg Krasnoyarsk	41	(2)
2008	Rostov-on-Don	39	(1)
2009–2010	Salyut Belgorod	61	(4)
2011–2012	Yenisey Krasnoyarsk	42	(1)
2012–2013	Astana	39	(3)
2014–2015	Aktobe	57	(3)
2016	Atyrau	25	(2)
2017–2018	Kaisar	49	(1)
2019	Ordabasy	9	(0)

International career
2012–2014	Kazakhstan	13	(0)
- * Club domestic league appearances and goals

Valery Aleksandrovich Korobkin (Russian: Валерий Александрович Коробкин; born 2 July 1984) is a Kazakhstani retired professional football player of Russian descent.

== Career ==
=== Club ===
Following the conclusion of the 2015 season, Korobkin was transfer listed by Aktobe. In January 2016, Korobkin signed for FC Atyrau. On 26 January 2017, Korobkin signed for FC Kaisar.

At the end of 2019, 35-year old Korobkin decided to retire. However, the announcement came in January 2020.

== Honours ==
Aktobe

- Kazakhstan Super Cup (1): 2014
