= Taras Tsarikayev =

Russian footballer

Taras Tsarikayev Тара́с Царика́ев
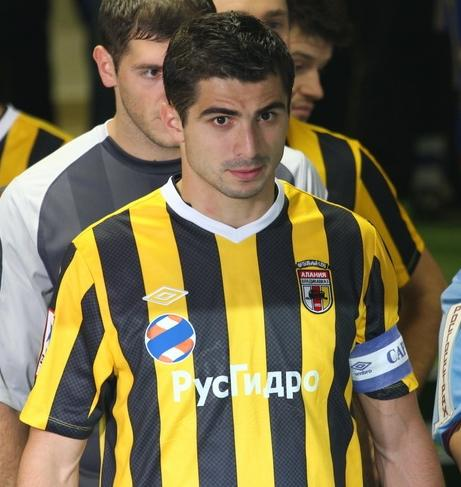
- Tsarikayev with Alania in 2012

Personal information
- Full name: Taras Taymurazovich Tsarikayev
- Date of birth: 17 June 1989 (age 37)
- Place of birth: Ordzhonikidze (now Vladikavkaz), Russian SFSR
- Height: 1.85 m (6 ft 1 in)
- Positions: Defender; striker

Senior career*
Years	Team	Apps	(Gls)
2005–2007	Avtodor Vladikavkaz	35	(1)
2007–2008	Lokomotiv Moscow	0	(0)
2009–2013	Alania Vladikavkaz	86	(1)
2014	Aktobe	23	(0)
2015–2016	Torpedo Armavir	21	(0)
2016–2017	Shinnik Yaroslavl	35	(0)
2017	Orenburg	3	(0)
2018	Rustavi	11	(0)
2018–2019	Luch Vladivostok	30	(0)
2019–2020	Alania Vladikavkaz	10	(0)

International career
2008	Russia U-19	4	(1)
2009	Russia U-20	1	(0)
- * Club domestic league appearances and goals

Taras Taymurazovich Tsarikayev (Russian: Тара́с Таймура́зович Царика́ев; born 17 June 1989) is a Russian former professional football player.

== Club career ==
He made his Russian Premier League debut for FC Alania Vladikavkaz on 31 July 2010 in a game against FC Terek Grozny.

== Career statistics ==
As of 18 November 2014

Club	Div	Season	League		Cup		Europe		Total	
Club	Div	Season	Apps	Goals	Apps	Goals	Apps	Goals	Apps	Goals
Avtodor Vladikavkaz	D3	2005	2	0	0	0	—		2	0
Avtodor Vladikavkaz	D3	2006	21	1	0	0	—		21	1
Avtodor Vladikavkaz	D3	2007	12	0	0	0	—		12	0
Avtodor Vladikavkaz	Total		35	1	0	0	0	0	35	1
Lokomotiv Moscow	D1	2007	0	0	0	0	0	0	0	0
Lokomotiv Moscow	D1	2008	0	0	0	0	0	0	0	0
Lokomotiv Moscow	Total		0	0	0	0	0	0	0	0
Alania Vladikavkaz	D2	2009	10	0	0	0	—		10	0
Alania Vladikavkaz	D1	2010	7	0	2	0	—		9	0
Alania Vladikavkaz	D2	2011–12	44	0	1	0	3	0	48	0
Alania Vladikavkaz	D1	2012–13	17	0	0	0	—		17	0
Alania Vladikavkaz	D2	2013–14	8	0	2	0	—		10	0
Alania Vladikavkaz	Total		86	0	5	0	3	0	94	0
Aktobe	D1	2014	23	0	3	0	6	0	32	0
Aktobe	Total		23	0	3	0	6	0	32	0
Torpedo Armavir	D2	2015–16	3	0	1	0	-		4	0
Torpedo Armavir	Total		3	0	1	0	0	0	4	0
Career total			147	1	9	0	9	0	164	1
