= Danilo Neco =

Brazilian footballer (born 1986)

Danilo Neco Данило Неко
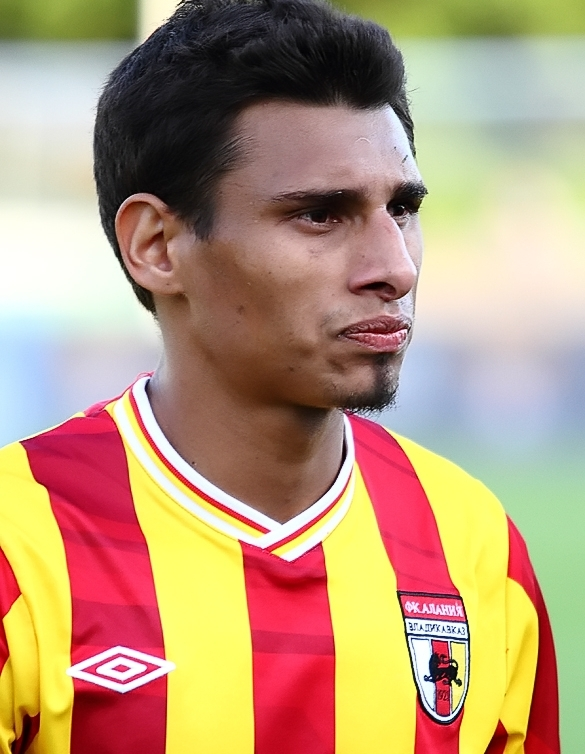
- Neco with Alania Vladikavkaz in 2011

Personal information
- Full name: Danilo Montecino Neco
- Date of birth: 27 January 1986 (age 40)
- Place of birth: Mirandópolis, São Paulo, Brazil
- Height: 1.74 m (5 ft 8 1/2 in)
- Position: Striker

Senior career*
| Years | Team | Apps | (Gls) |
| 2004–2011 | Ponte Preta | 156 | (81) |
| 2010 | → Jeju United (loan) | 29 | (6) |
| 2011–2013 | Alania Vladikavkaz | 57 | (15) |
| 2014–2015 | Aktobe | 49 | (7) |
| 2017 | Seongnam | 4 | (0) |
- * Club domestic league appearances and goals

Danilo Montecino Neco (born 27 January 1986) is a Brazilian former football player.

== Career ==
In January 2014, Neco signed a one-year contract with Aktobe of the Kazakhstan Premier League, following the cancellation of his Alania Vladikavkaz contract after they dissolved. Following the conclusion of the 2015 season, Neco was transfer listed by Aktobe. In January 2017, Neco joined South Korean club Seongnam FC of the K League Challenge.

== Career statistics ==
Club statistics
| Season | Club | League | League | | Cup | | Super Cup | | Continental | | Total | |
| Season | Club | League | App | Goals | App | Goals | App | Goals | App | Goals | App | Goals |
|---|---|---|---|---|---|---|---|---|---|---|---|---|
| 2010 | Jeju United (loan) | K League | 29 | 6 | 3 | 0 | - | | - | | 32 | 6 |
| 2011–12 | Alania Vladikavkaz | FNL | 28 | 4 | 2 | 1 | - | | 4 | 1 | 34 | 6 |
| 2012–13 | Alania Vladikavkaz | RPL | 23 | 9 | 0 | 0 | - | | - | | 23 | 9 |
| 2013–14 | Alania Vladikavkaz | FNL | 6 | 2 | 0 | 0 | - | | - | | 6 | 2 |
| 2014 | Aktobe | Kazakhstan Premier League | 25 | 5 | 2 | 0 | 1 | 1 | 6 | 1 | 34 | 7 |
| 2015 | Aktobe | Kazakhstan Premier League | 24 | 2 | 2 | 0 | 0 | 0 | 2 | 0 | 28 | 2 |
| Total | Brazil | | | | | | - | | - | | | |
| Total | South Korea | | 29 | 6 | 3 | 1 | - | | - | | 32 | 7 |
| Total | Russia | | 57 | 15 | 2 | 1 | - | | 4 | 1 | 63 | 17 |
| Total | Kazakhstan | | 49 | 7 | 4 | 0 | 1 | 1 | 8 | 1 | 62 | 9 |
| Total | | | 135 | 28 | 9 | 2 | 1 | 1 | 12 | 2 | 157 | 33 |

== Honours ==
=== Aktobe ===
- Kazakhstan Super Cup (1): 2014
