= Anderson Santana =

Brazilian footballer (born 1986)

Personal information
- Full name: Anderson Santana dos Santos
- Date of birth: April 24, 1986 (age 40)
- Place of birth: Belo Horizonte, Brazil
- Height: 1.80 m (5 ft 11 in)
- Position: Left back

Youth career
- 2004–2005: Mamoré

Senior career*
Years	Team	Apps	(Gls)
2005–2006	Mamoré	48	(0)
2006	→ Cabofriense (loan)	?	(?)
2007	Cruzeiro	3	(0)
2008	→ Tupi (loan)	?	(?)
2008	→ Linhares (loan)	?	(?)
2008–2010	Náutico	29	(4)
2010	→ Terek Grozny (loan)	0	(0)
2010–2012	Vitória Guimarães	13	(1)
2012–2014	Chornomorets Odesa	40	(3)
2014–2015	Aktobe	38	(1)
- * Club domestic league appearances and goals as of 9 November 2015

Anderson Santana dos Santos, known as Anderson Santana or Anderson Mineiro in Brazil (born April 24, 1986), is a Brazilian left back who last played for Aktobe in the Kazakhstan Premier League.

== Career ==
At the start of March 2014, Anderson Santana left Chornomorets Odesa due to the civil unrest caused by the 2014 Ukrainian revolution.

On 12 June 2014, Anderson Santana joined Kazakhstan Premier League side Aktobe on an 18-month contract.

== Career statistics ==
As of 9 November 2015

Club statistics
Season	Club	League	League		Cup		Super Cup		Continental		Total	
Season	Club	League	App	Goals	App	Goals	App	Goals	App	Goals	App	Goals
2010–11	Vitória de Guimarães	Primeira Liga	4	0	3	0	0	0	0	0	7	0
2011–12	Vitória de Guimarães	Primeira Liga	9	1	2	0	1	0	4	0	16	1
2012–13	Chornomorets Odesa	Ukrainian Premier League	14	0	0	0	0	0	12	0	26	0
2013–14	Chornomorets Odesa	Ukrainian Premier League	26	3	4	0	0	0	0	0	30	3
2014	Aktobe	Kazakhstan Premier League	15	1	2	0	0	0	6	0	23	1
2015	Aktobe	Kazakhstan Premier League	23	0	1	0	0	0	0	0	26	0
Total	Portugal		13	1	5	0	1	0	4	0	23	1
Total	Ukraine		40	3	4	0	-		12	0	56	3
Total	Kazakhstan		38	1	5	0	0	0	6	0	49	1
Total			91	1	14	0	1	0	22	0	128	5
