= Central Stadium (Aktobe) =

Multi-purpose stadium

Coordinates: 50°17′29.7″N 57°09′32.3″E

Koblandy Batyr Stadium
- (Kazakh: Қобыланды батыр стадионы, Qobylandy batyr stadıony)
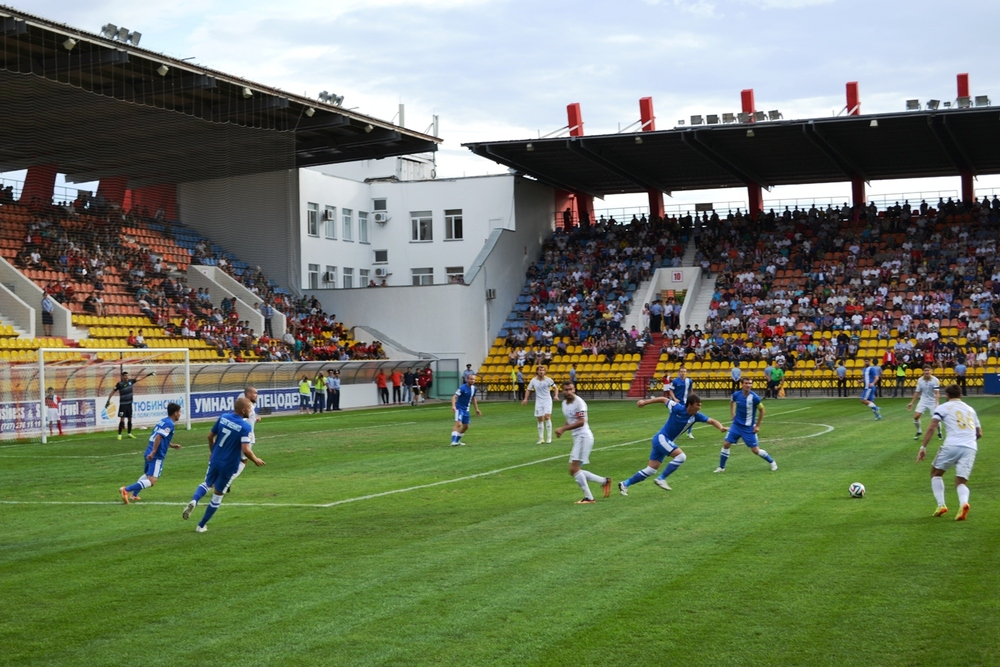
- UEFA
- Interactive map of Koblandy Batyr Stadium
- Location: Aktobe, Kazakhstan; 56, Abilkhayir khan Avenue, 030000
- Owner: Municipality of Aktobe
- Capacity: 12,669
- Surface: Grass
- Record attendance: 13,400 (FC Aktobe-FC Kairat 4-1, 11 November 2022)
- Field size: 104 x 68

Construction
- Built: 1970-1975
- Opened: 1975
- Architect: Kostin Alexey

Tenant
- FC Aktobe

The Koblandy Batyr Stadium (Kazakh: Қобыланды батыр стадионы, Qobylandy batyr stadıony) is the main football arena of the city and for FC Aktobe. It was constructed in 1975. On the opening day on August 28, 1975, Aktyubinets (now FC Aktobe) played against CSKA Moscow. Match ended with score 1:0 in favor of visiting team. Kopeykin scored the goal.

The stadium is one of the best attended in Kazakhstan with capacity of just under 13,500 people.

== Information ==
The stadium meets international standards and is considered one of the best in Kazakhstan in terms of technical equipment and originality of construction. It has four tribunes called after the cardinal points. The main tribune – western, which holds seats for commentators and VIP. On the east tribune special seats for disabled people are provided. The stadium has roof over all seats and a big screen. Cash desk and office of FC Aktobe are located in the stadium. There are no running tracks, as it is purely a football stadium.

== Main characteristics of stadium ==
- Field size – 105m x 68 m
- Capacity – 12.805 people
- Surface – natural
- Capacity of guest sector – 500 seats
- Number of TV positions – 3
- Commentator positions – 2 seats
- Press— 20 seats
- Lighting – 1800th lux.
- Video board – display system – 10х9 m
- Number of cash desks – 5
- Surveillance cameras – 6 internal, 4 external

== Reconstruction ==
After the stadium opened in 1975, the last reconstruction was in 2000, when plastic seating and the light-emitting diode board were installed. In 2005 the stadium met all UEFA standards. Heating system, water supply and the sewage were replaced. The press center area was expanded to 54 sq.m., and the dispatcher room to 21 sq.m. 142 bulbs in the floodlight system with a total capacity of 1800 watts were installed. The grass was replaced and an automatic watering system installed. Installation of under soil heating of the pitch started on April 28, 2011, and the lawn was renewed again for the first time after 2005. This system is only used in early Spring and late Autumn (Fall) to assist grass growth.

== Facts ==
For five years, from October 2, 2004, to August 27, 2009 (1790 days, a record of Kazakhstan) FC Aktobe did not suffer a single loss at the home field in all tournaments (Kazakhstan Premier League, Kazakhstan Cup, UEFA Champions League and Europa League). This record was broken only after defeat to Werder Bremen.

Aktobe has not suffered defeat, not even in the years from 2010 to 2011. Only on May 6, 2012, they lost to the guest FC Tobol and then also to Akzhaiyk and Genk from Belgium.

== National team games ==
| Date | Team 1 | Results | Team 2 | Qualification tournament |
|---|---|---|---|---|
| 16 October 2007 | Kazakhstan (U-21) | 4:1 | Georgia (U-21) | EM 2009 |
| 6 October 2016 | Kazakhstan (U-21) | 0:1 | England (U-21) | EM 2017 |
| 11 October 2016 | Kazakhstan (U-21) | 0:3 | Norway (U-21) | EM 2017 |
| 1 September 2017 | Kazakhstan (U-21) | 1:1 | Montenegro (U-21) | EM 2019 |

== Address ==
- 56, Abilkhayir khan Avenue, 030000, Aktobe, Kazakhstan
