= 2019 FC Kaisar season =

FC Kaisar
2019 season
- Chairman: Nurlan Abuov
- Manager: Stoycho Mladenov
- Stadium: Gani Muratbayev Stadium
- Premier League: 6th
- Kazakhstan Cup: Champions
- Top goalscorer: League: Tigran Barseghyan (11); All: Tigran Barseghyan (11)
Home colours	Away colours

The 2019 FC Kaisar season is the club's third season back in the Kazakhstan Premier League, the highest tier of association football in Kazakhstan, and 22nd in total. Kaisar will also participate in the Kazakhstan Cup.

== Squad ==
As of match played 10 November 2019

No.	Name	Nationality	Position	Date of birth (age)	Signed from	Signed in	Contract ends	Apps.	Goals
Goalkeepers
1	Aleksandr Grigorenko	(Kazakhstan)	GK	6 February 1985 (age 41)	Taraz	2017		58	0
34	Nurymzhan Salaidin	(Kazakhstan)	GK	27 October 1995 (age 31)	Baikonur	2018			
71	Marsel Islamkulov	(Kyrgyzstan)	GK	18 April 1994 (age 32)	Baikonur	2016			
Defenders|-
2	Olzhas Altayev	(Kazakhstan)	DF	15 July 1989 (age 37)	Kyzylzhar	2019			
5	Mark Gorman	(Kazakhstan)	DF	9 February 1989 (age 37)	Tobol	2018		30	0
13	Ilyas Amirseitov	(Kazakhstan)	DF	22 October 1989 (age 37)	Zhetysu	2017		84	0
20	Ivan Sadownichy	(Belarus)	DF	11 May 1987 (age 39)	Zhetysu	2019		16	2
22	Aleksandr Marochkin	(Kazakhstan)	DF	14 July 1990 (age 36)	Okzhetpes	2018			
33	Abdel Lamanje	(Cameroon)	DF	27 July 1990 (age 36)	Atyrau	2017		89	5
55	Ivan Graf	(Croatia)	DF	17 June 1987 (age 39)	Irtysh Pavlodar	2016			
88	Valentin Chureyev	(Kazakhstan)	DF	29 August 1986 (age 40)	Atyrau	2017		44	0
Midfielders
8	Askhat Tagybergen	(Kazakhstan)	MF	9 August 1990 (age 36)	Astana	2018		113	14
10	Duman Narzildaev	(Kazakhstan)	MF	6 September 1993 (age 33)	Youth Team	2011			
11	Tigran Barseghyan	(Armenia)	MF	22 September 1993 (age 33)	Vardar	2019		32	12
15	Shokhan Abzalov	(Kazakhstan)	MF	11 September 1993 (age 33)	Baikonur	2019		14	1
17	Bekzat Kurmanbekuly	(Kazakhstan)	MF	14 April 2000 (age 26)	Youth team	2019		2	0
27	Samat Balymbetov	(Kazakhstan)	MF	10 April 1994 (age 32)		2019		5	0
77	André Bukia	(Democratic Republic of the Congo)	MF	3 March 1995 (age 31)	Arouca	2019		16	1
85	Clarence Bitang	(Cameroon)	MF	2 September 1992 (age 34)	Vardar	2019		14	0
86	Joshua John	(Aruba)	MF	1 October 1988 (age 38)	Bursaspor	2019		23	1
Forwards
18	Kule Mbombo	(Democratic Republic of the Congo)	FW	10 May 1996 (age 30)	Vita Club	2019		30	9
29	Orken Makhan	(Kazakhstan)	FW	27 January 1998 (age 28)	Youth Team	2018		10	1
78	Ihar Zyankovich	(Belarus)	FW	17 September 1987 (age 39)	Atyrau	2018		33	4
Players away on loan
Left during the season
7	Maksat Baizhanov	(Kazakhstan)	MF	6 August 1984 (age 42)	Shakhter Karagandy	2017		75	7
19	Marat Khairullin	(Kazakhstan)	MF	26 April 1984 (age 42)	Atyrau	2019		16	0
77	Carlitos	(Portugal)	MF	9 March 1993 (age 33)	Wisła Płock	2019		7	0
87	Bratislav Punoševac	(Serbia)	FW	9 July 1987 (age 39)	Kyzylzhar	2018		29	8

== Transfers ==
=== In ===
Date	Position	Nationality	Name	From	Fee	Ref.
Winter 2019	DF	(Belarus)	Ivan Sadownichy	Zhetysu	Undisclosed	
Winter 2019	MF	(Kazakhstan)	Marat Khairullin	Atyrau	Undisclosed	
15 January 2019	MF	(Aruba)	Joshua John	Bursaspor	Undisclosed	
21 January 2019	FW	(Democratic Republic of the Congo)	Kule Mbombo	Vita Club	Undisclosed	
24 January 2019	MF	(Armenia)	Tigran Barseghyan	Vardar	Undisclosed	
31 January 2019	FW	(Kazakhstan)	Shokan Abzalov	Baikonur	Undisclosed	
20 February 2019	MF	(Portugal)	Carlitos	Wisła Płock	Undisclosed	
3 March 2019	DF	(Kazakhstan)	Olzhas Altayev	Kyzylzhar	Undisclosed	
12 July 2019	MF	(Democratic Republic of the Congo)	André Bukia	Arouca	Undisclosed	
1 August 2019	MF	(Cameroon)	Clarence Bitang	Vardar	Undisclosed	

=== Out ===
Date	Position	Nationality	Name	From	Fee	Ref.
Summer 2019	MF	(Kazakhstan)	Marat Khairullin	Baikonur	Undisclosed	

=== Released ===
Date	Position	Nationality	Name	Joined	Date
31 December 2018	DF	(Kazakhstan)	Aldan Baltayev		
31 December 2018	DF	(Kazakhstan)	Dmitri Yevstigneyev		
31 December 2018	DF	(Kazakhstan)	Aybol Zhakhayev		
31 December 2018	MF	(Kazakhstan)	Valeri Korobkin	Ordabasy	
31 December 2018	MF	(Kenya)	Paul Were	Trikala	
31 December 2018	MF	(Sierra Leone)	John Kamara	Keşla	8 January 2019
31 December 2018	MF	(Ukraine)	Volodymyr Arzhanov	Chornomorets Odesa	
31 December 2018	FW	(Ivory Coast)	Franck Dja Djédjé	Cannes	
31 December 2018	FW	(Kazakhstan)	Daurenbek Tazhimbetov	Akzhayik	
31 December 2018	FW	(Martinique)	Mathias Coureur	Seongnam	
12 July 2019	MF	(Portugal)	Carlitos	Doxa Katokopias	
3 September 2019	MF	(Kazakhstan)	Maksat Baizhanov	Atyrau	21 February 2020
25 September 2019	FW	(Serbia)	Bratislav Punoševac		
31 December 2019	DF	(Cameroon)	Abdel Lamanje	Shakhter Karagandy	24 January 2020
31 December 2019	DF	(Kazakhstan)	Aleksandr Marochkin	Tobol	1 January 2020
31 December 2019	DF	(Belarus)	Ivan Sadownichy		
31 December 2019	DF	(Kazakhstan)	Olzhas Altayev		
31 December 2019	MF	(Aruba)	Joshua John		
31 December 2019	MF	(Kazakhstan)	Samat Balymbetov		
31 December 2019	MF	(Kazakhstan)	Valentin Chureyev	Atyrau	3 March 2020
31 December 2019	FW	(Belarus)	Ihar Zyankovich	Kyzylzhar	10 February 2020
31 December 2019	FW	(Democratic Republic of the Congo)	Kule Mbombo	Riga	21 January 2020

== Competitions ==
=== Premier League ===
==== Results summary ====
Overall								Home						Away					
Pld	W	D	L	GF	GA	GD	Pts	W	D	L	GF	GA	GD	W	D	L	GF	GA	GD
33	12	6	15	37	43	−6	42	3	6	8	15	18	−3	9	0	7	22	25	−3

Last updated: 10 November 2019.
Source: See Results

==== Results by round ====
Round	1	2	3	4	5	6	7	8	9	10	11	12	13	14	15	16	17	18	19	20	21	22	23	24	25	26	27	28	29	30	31	32
Ground	H	H	A	H	A	H	A	H	A	H	A	A	H	A	H	A	H	A	H	A	H	A	A	H	H	A	H	A	A	H	A	H
Result	L	L	W	D	W	D	W	W	W	W	W	L	W	L	D	W	D	L	L	W	L	W	L	L	L	W	L	L	L	L	L	D
Position	7	8	6	7	6	6	6	5	4	3	2	4	4	5	5	5	5	5	5	5	5	5	6	6	6	6	6	6	6	6	6	6

Source: See Results
A = Away; H = Home; W = Win; D = Draw; L = Loss

==== Results ====
10 March 2019 1	Kaisar	0 – 1	Atyrau	Kyzylorda
16:00 (UTC+6)	John (yellow card) 6'; Punoševac (yellow card) 42'; A.Marochkin (yellow card) 90+3'	Report	D.Mazhitov 2'; A.Shabaev (yellow card) 19'; K.Kalmuratov (yellow card) 58'; Tkachuk (yellow card) 82'; Sergienko (red card) 90+2'	Stadium: Gani Muratbayev Stadium; Attendance: 4,000; Referee: Denis Izmailov

15 March 2019 2	Kaisar	0 – 1	Zhetysu	Kyzylorda
16:00 (UTC+6)	Barseghyan (yellow card) 44'; I.Amirseitov (yellow card) 45+2'	Report	Naumov 20'; O.Kerimzhanov (yellow card) 86'	Stadium: Gani Muratbayev Stadium; Attendance: 1,500; Referee: Igor Chesnokov

30 March 2019 3	Irtysh Pavlodar	0 – 1	Kaisar	Pavlodar
15:00 (UTC+6)	Vitas (yellow card) 38'; D.Shmidt (yellow card) 77'	Report	Baizhanov 90+1'; Carlitos (yellow card) 90+2'	Stadium: Central Stadium; Attendance: 5,800; Referee: Sergey Gorokhovodatskiy

7 April 2019 4	Kaisar	0 – 0	Astana	Kyzylorda
17:00 (UTC+6)	Mbombo (yellow card) 32'; Barseghyan (yellow card) 36'; Gorman (yellow card) 49'; Narzildaev (yellow card) 66'	Report	Shomko (yellow card) 36'; Tomasov (yellow card) 50'	Stadium: Gani Muratbayev Stadium; Attendance: 3,000; Referee: Aleksandr Gauzer

14 April 2019 5	Taraz	1 – 2	Kaisar	Taraz
16:00 (UTC+6)	Nyuiadzi 23'; M.Amirkhanov (yellow card) 75'	Report	Narzildaev (yellow card) 28'; Graf 43'; Punoševac 76'	Stadium: Central Stadium; Attendance: 4,000; Referee: Aydin Rakhimbayev

20 April 2019 6	Kaisar	0 – 0	Ordabasy	Kyzylorda
17:00 (UTC+6)	Gorman (yellow card) 41'; Barseghyan (yellow card) 62'	Report	Mehanović (yellow card) 81'	Stadium: Gani Muratbayev Stadium; Attendance: 2,000; Referee: Grigory Moskovchenko

27 April 2019 7	Shakhter Karagandy	0 – 1	Kaisar	Nur-Sultan
15:00 (UTC+6)	Zenjov (yellow card) 58'; Baranovskyi (yellow card) 60'; Shkodra (yellow card) 70' (yellow-red card) 89'	Report	Mbombo 20'; S.Abzalov (yellow card) 83'; Tagybergen (yellow card) 84'; Grigorenko (yellow card) 86'	Stadium: Astana Arena; Attendance: 500; Referee: Furkat Atajanov

1 May 2019 8	Kaisar	2 – 1	Kairat	Kyzylorda
17:30 (UTC+6)	Tagybergen (yellow card) 45+1' (goal) 64'; A.Marochkin 52'; Gorman (yellow card) 81'	Report	Eppel 20'; Kuat (yellow card) 58'; Abiken (yellow card) 62'	Stadium: Gani Muratbayev Stadium; Attendance: 2,600; Referee: Denis Izmailov

5 May 2019 9	Aktobe	1 – 3	Kaisar	Aktobe
19:00 (UTC+6)	A.Aimbetov 43'; Volkov (yellow card) 47'; A.Shurigin (yellow card) 90+2'; Marjanović (yellow card) 90+5'; A.Azhimov (yellow card) 90+5'	Report	A.Marochkin 5'; Tagybergen 41'; Barseghyan 44'; S.Abzalov (yellow card) 90'; Grigorenko (yellow card) 90+5'	Stadium: Central Stadium; Attendance: 9,000; Referee: Sergey Nozhenko

12 May 2019 10	Kaisar	5 – 1	Tobol	Kyzylorda
18:00 (UTC+6)	Barseghyan 9', 85'; Mbombo 39'; Tagybergen 43'; I.Amirseitov (yellow card) 73'; S.Abzalov 90+4'	Report	Kleshchenko (yellow card) 45+2'; Kvekveskiri 47'; Turysbek (yellow card) 75'	Stadium: Gani Muratbayev Stadium; Attendance: 3,500; Referee: Bagdat Abdullaev

18 May 2019 11	Okzhetpes	1 – 2	Kaisar	Kokshetau
17:00 (UTC+6)	Alves 37'; Dmitrijev (yellow card) 80'	Report	Barseghyan 10'; John 74'; V.Chureyev (yellow card) 84'	Stadium: Okzhetpes Stadium; Attendance: 3,000; Referee: Aydin Rakhimbayev

24 May 2019 12	Zhetysu	1 – 0	Kaisar	Taldıqorğan
17:30 (UTC+6)	Hovhannisyan 52'; O.Kerimzhanov (yellow card) 79'	Report		Stadium: Zhetysu Stadium; Attendance: 2,000; Referee: Artyom Kuchin

31 May 2019 13	Kaisar	2 – 0	Irtysh Pavlodar	Kyzylorda
19:00 (UTC+6)	Lamanje (yellow card) 29' (goal) 84'; Barseghyan 47'; Khairullin (yellow card) 90'; John (yellow card) 90'	Report	A.Nusip (yellow card) 38'; R.Aslan (yellow card) 54'; M.Raimbek (yellow card) 88'; A.Kenesov (yellow card) 90'; R.Yesimov (yellow card) 90'; Tsirin (yellow card) 90'	Stadium: Gani Muratbayev Stadium; Attendance: 2,700; Referee: Denis Izmailov

16 June 2019 14	Astana	4 – 1	Astana	Nur-Sultan
19:00 (UTC+6)	Murtazayev 14'; Pertsukh 26'; Rotariu 46'; Tomasov 50'; Muzhikov (yellow card) 60'	Report	Narzildaev (yellow card) 45'; Graf (yellow card) 54'; Barseghyan 79'; Gorman (yellow card) 89'	Stadium: Astana Arena; Attendance: 2,500; Referee: Anatolyi Vishnichenko

23 June 2019 15	Kaisar	1 – 1	Taraz	Kyzylorda
18:00 (UTC+6)	Mbombo 5'; Barseghyan (yellow card) 64'; I.Amirseitov (yellow card) 66'	Report	A.Taubay 30' (yellow card) 36'; M.Amirkhanov (yellow card) 58'; A.Suley (yellow card) 65' (yellow-red card) 90+7'	Stadium: Gani Muratbayev Stadium; Attendance: 3,000; Referee: Zhandos Abzhan

30 June 2019 16	Ordabasy	1 – 2	Kaisar	Shymkent
19:00 (UTC+6)	Zhangylyshbay 40'; João Paulo (yellow card) 41'	Report	Lamanje (yellow card) 32'; Mbombo 37' (yellow card) 86'; John (yellow card) 59'; Tagybergen (yellow card) 75'; O.Makhan (yellow card) 90+2' (goal) 90+7'	Stadium: Kazhymukan Munaitpasov Stadium; Attendance: 4,500; Referee: Aydin Rakhimbayev

6 July 2019 17	Kaisar	2 – 2	Shakhter Karagandy	Kyzylorda
20:00 (UTC+6)	Graf 17'; Mbombo 29'	Report	Nurgaliyev 35'; Najaryan (yellow card) 50'; Pešić 63'; Shatskiy (yellow card) 90'	Stadium: Gani Muratbayev Stadium; Attendance: 6,500; Referee: Georgiy Chekhovskiy

14 July 2019 18	Kairat	5 – 1	Kaisar	Almaty
20:00 (UTC+6)	Eppel 16', 59', 73' (yellow card) 38'; Palitsevich (yellow card) 27'; Alip (yellow card) 48'; Abiken (yellow card) 55' (goal) 62'; Islamkhan 80' (pen.)	Report	Marochkin (yellow card) 36'; Narzildaev (yellow card) 36'; Baizhanov (yellow card) 38'; Barseghyan 89'	Stadium: Central Stadium; Attendance: 6,500; Referee: Bolat Karlibayev

20 July 2019 19	Kaisar	0 – 1	Aktobe	Kyzylorda
21:00 (UTC+6)		Report	A.Kakimov (yellow card) 39'; A.Saulet 41'; A.Tanzharikov (yellow card) 75'; U.Syrlybayev (yellow card) 90+5'	Stadium: Gani Muratbayev Stadium; Attendance: 6,500; Referee: Anatolyi Vishnichenko

28 July 2019 20	Tobol	0 – 2	Kaisar	Kostanay
19:00 (UTC+6)	Nurgaliev (yellow card) 26'; Dmitrenko (yellow card) 69' (yellow-red card) 90+4'; Abilgazy (yellow card) 87'	Report	Mbombo 9', 21'; Narzildaev (yellow card) 66'; Grigorenko (yellow card) 90+2'	Stadium: Central Stadium; Attendance: 5,500; Referee: Igor Chesnokov

3 August 2019 21	Kaisar	0 – 1	Okzhetpes	Kyzylorda
20:00 (UTC+6)	Mbombo (yellow card) 37'; Tagybergen (yellow card) 74'; I.Amirseitov (yellow card) 76'; Barseghyan (yellow card) 90+5'	Report	Bobko (yellow card) 30'; Moldakaraev 40' (yellow card) 73'; A.Saparov (yellow card) 42'; T.Zhakupov (yellow card) 49'; Y.Baginsky (yellow card) 90+4'	Stadium: Gani Muratbayev Stadium; Attendance: 3,500; Referee: Denis Tevyashov

10 August 2019 22	Atyrau	1 – 3	Kaisar	Atyrau
20:00 (UTC+6)	I.Antipov 37'; A.Makuov (yellow card) 39'; M.Gabyshev (yellow card) 52'	Report	Barseghyan 31', 45', 53'; Graf (yellow card) 65'; Gorman (yellow card) 83'	Stadium: Munaishy Stadium; Attendance: 4,000; Referee: Aydin Rakhimbayev

18 August 2019 23	Shakhter Karagandy	3 – 0	Kaisar	Karaganda
19:00 (UTC+6)	Shkodra 52'; Nurgaliyev 61'; Zenjov (yellow card) 70' (goal) 75'	Report	Mbombo (yellow card) 47'; Sadownichy (yellow card) 54'	Stadium: Shakhter Stadium; Attendance: 6,000; Referee: Bagdat Abdullaev

25 August 2019 24	Kaisar	0 – 2	Zhetysu	Kyzylorda
19:00 (UTC+6)	Narzildaev (yellow card) 27'; Barseghyan (yellow card) 77'	Report	Adamović 22'; Mawutor (yellow card) 26'; Darabayev (yellow card) 45+1'; Hovhannisyan (yellow card) 52'; Naumov (yellow card) 78'; Kuklys 80'	Stadium: Gani Muratbayev Stadium; Attendance: 3,000; Referee: Sergey Gorokhovodatskiy

31 August 2019 25	Kaisar	1 – 3	Aktobe	Kyzylorda
19:00 (UTC+6)	Marochkin (red card) 21'; Bitang (yellow card) 34'; Barseghyan (yellow card) 42' (goal) 85'; Tagybergen (yellow card) 44'	Report	Aimbetov 17', 63', 78'; R.Sakhibov (yellow card) 27'; A.Tanzharikov (yellow card) 56'	Stadium: Gani Muratbayev Stadium; Attendance: 2,500; Referee: Georgiy Chekhovskiy

15 September 2019 26	Ordabasy	0 – 2	Kaisar	Shymkent
18:00 (UTC+6)	Malyi (yellow card) 39'; Bystrov (yellow card) 40'; Diakate (yellow card) 78'	Report	Mbombo 23', 31'; Narzildaev (yellow card) 45'; Sadownichy (yellow card) 54'; Bukia (yellow card) 81'	Stadium: Kazhymukan Munaitpasov Stadium; Attendance: 4,000; Referee: Denis Tevyashov

21 September 2019 27	Kaisar	0 – 1	Kairat	Kyzylorda
18:00 (UTC+6)	Lamanje (yellow card) 59'	Report	Kuat (yellow card) 25'; Dugalić 56'; Alip (yellow card) 57'; Suyumbayev (yellow card) 74'	Stadium: Gani Muratbayev Stadium; Attendance: 3,500; Referee: Aleksandr Gauzer

29 September 2019 28	Astana	3 – 0	Kaisar	Nur-Sultan
19:00 (UTC+6)	Beisebekov 14'; Khizhnichenko 24', 58'; Mayewski (yellow card) 27'	Report	Graf (yellow card) 61'; Sadownichy (yellow card) 71'; V.Chureyev (yellow card) 82'; Gorman (yellow card) 90+2'	Stadium: Astana Arena; Attendance: 2,500; Referee: Igor Chesnokov

19 October 2019 30	Irtysh Pavlodar	2 – 1	Kaisar	Pavlodar
16:00 (UTC+6)	Manzorro (yellow card) 11' (goal) 37' (pen.); R.Yesimov 51'	Report	Bitang (yellow card) 15'; Marochkin (red card) 36'; Narzildaev (yellow card) 36'; Lamanje 56'; Sadownichy (yellow card) 62' (yellow-red card) 80'	Stadium: Central Stadium; Attendance: 1,200; Referee: Furkat Atajanov

25 October 2019 31	Kaisar	0 – 1	Atyrau	Kyzylorda
16:00 (UTC+6)	Barseghyan (yellow card) 21'; Bitang (yellow card) 49'; Gorman (yellow card) 62'; Mbombo (yellow card) 87'; Lamanje (yellow card) 90'	Report	E.Abdrakhmanov (yellow card) 5'; Ablitarov (yellow card) 28'; Grzelczak 39'	Stadium: Gani Muratbayev Stadium; Attendance: 1,500; Referee: Arman Ismuratov

30 October 2019 29	Kaisar	1 – 1	Tobol	Kyzylorda
16:00 (UTC+6)	Tagybergen 40' (yellow card) 70'; M.Islamkulov (yellow card) 75'; O.Makhan (yellow card) 77'; John (yellow card) 79'; V.Chureyev (yellow card) 90+2'	Report	Andriuškevičius (yellow card) 16'; Nurgaliev 90+3'	Stadium: Gani Muratbayev Stadium; Attendance: 3,000; Referee: Timur Kumashev
Note: Match originally scheduled for 4 October 2019 but postponed due to Kaisar's involvement in 2019 Kazakhstan Cup Final on 6 October 2019.

3 November 2019 32	Taraz	2 – 1	Kaisar	Taraz
15:00 (UTC+6)	A.Suley 11'; B.Shadmanov 45+3' (pen.); R.Rozybakiev (yellow card) 46'; Lobjanidze (yellow card) 79'	Report	Bukia 30'; Lamanje (yellow card) 45+2'; Tagybergen (yellow card) 60'; Gorman (yellow card) 86'	Stadium: Central Stadium; Attendance: 3,500; Referee: Zhandos Abzhan

10 November 2019 33	Kaisar	1 – 1	Okzhetpes	Kyzylorda
15:00 (UTC+6)	Barseghyan 40'; Lamanje (yellow card) 50'; I.Amirseitov (yellow card) 60'; V.Chureyev (yellow card) 80'; D.Chureyev (yellow card) 85'	Report	E.Ashikhmin (yellow card) 25'; S.Zhumakhanov (yellow card) 27'; Moldakaraev (yellow card) 63'; Nusserbayev 84'	Stadium: Gani Muratbayev Stadium; Attendance: 2,500; Referee: Artyom Kuchin

==== League table ====
Pos	Team	Pld	W	D	L	GF	GA	GD	Pts	Qualification or relegation
4	Tobol	33	19	6	8	45	27	+18	63	
5	Zhetysu	33	16	8	9	45	25	+20	56	
6	Kaisar	33	12	6	15	37	43	−6	42	Qualification for the Europa League second qualifying round (Note: Kaisar qualified for the Europa League second qualifying round by winning the 2019 Kazakhstan Cup.)
7	Okzhetpes	33	11	7	15	44	49	−5	40	
8	Irtysh Pavlodar	33	11	4	18	30	45	−15	37	

Source: UEFA, Soccerway
Rules for classification: 1) Points; 2) Goal difference; 3) Matches won; 4) Goals scored; 5) Away goals scored; 6) Head-to-head points; 7) Head-to-head matches won; 8) Head-to-head goal difference; 9) Head-to-head goals scored; 10) Head-to-head away goals scored; 11) Draw.

=== Kazakhstan Cup ===
10 April 2019 Last 16	Akademiya Ontustik	1 – 2 (a.e.t.)	Kaisar	Shymkent
15:00 (UTC+6)	K.Karimolla 26'; A.Mukhamed (yellow card) 46'; I.Chervov (yellow card) 110' (yellow-red card) 112'; G.Ermurzaev (yellow card) 116'	Report	Carlitos (yellow card) 19'; Sadownichy 31'; Barseghyan (yellow card) 45' (red card) 45'; Punoševac 106'	Stadium: BIIK Stadium; Attendance: 200; Referee: Arman Ismuratov

8 May 2019 Quarterfinal	Irtysh Pavlodar	1 – 2	Kaisar	Pavlodar
18:30 (UTC+6)	Paragulgov 15'; Manzorro (yellow card) 36'; Fonseca (yellow card) 49'; S.Tursynbay (yellow card) 55'	Report	Carlitos (yellow card) 26'; S.Abzalov (yellow card) 61'; Sadownichy 69'; Tagybergen 88'	Stadium: Central Stadium; Attendance: 2,000; Referee: Alexander Gauzer

22 May 2019 Semifinal 1st leg	Tobol	1 – 0	Kaisar	Kostanay
19:00 (UTC+6)	Kankava (yellow card) 3'; Bocharov (yellow card) 29'; Fedin 73'; Kleshchenko (yellow card) 83'; Nurgaliev (yellow card) 90+1'	Report	Graf (yellow card) 17'; Tagybergen (yellow card) 88'	Stadium: Central Stadium; Attendance: 3,000; Referee: Igor Chesnokov

19 June 2019 Semifinal 2nd leg	Kaisar	3 – 1 (3 – 2 agg.)	Tobol	Kyzylorda
18:00 (UTC+6)	Barseghyan 15', 90+6' (pen.); Narzildaev (yellow card) 47'; Mbombo 66'	Report	Kassaï (yellow card) 51'; Žulpa 88'; Valiullin (yellow card) 90+3'	Stadium: Gani Muratbayev Stadium; Attendance: 3,000; Referee: Artem Kuchin

==== Final ====
6 October 2019	Atyrau	1 – 2 (a.e.t.)	Kaisar	Nur-Sultan
15:00 (UTC+6)	E.Abdrakhmanov (yellow card) 53'; Grzelczak 67'; Ngwem (yellow card) 68' (yellow-red card) 93'; N.Kalmenov (yellow card) 70'; A.Shabaev (yellow card) 105+1'; R.Dzhumatov (yellow card) 105+2'; I.Antipov (yellow card) 116'; K.Kalmuratov (yellow card) 120+5'	Report	John (yellow card) 4'; Tagybergen (red card) 70'; Barseghyan (yellow card) 70'; Marochkin (yellow card) 80'; Zyankovich 88'; Narzildaev 120+3'	Stadium: Astana Arena; Attendance: 4,500; Referee: Timur Kumashev

== Squad statistics ==
As of match played 10 November 2019

=== Appearances and goals ===
No.	Pos	Nat	Player	Total		Premier League		Kazakhstan Cup	
No.	Pos	Nat	Player	Apps	Goals	Apps	Goals	Apps	Goals
1	GK	(Kazakhstan) KAZ	Aleksandr Grigorenko	20	0	19	0	1	0
2	DF	(Kazakhstan) KAZ	Olzhas Altayev	3	0	0+1	0	2	0
5	DF	(Kazakhstan) KAZ	Mark Gorman	29	0	20+6	0	3	0
8	MF	(Kazakhstan) KAZ	Askhat Tagybergen	33	5	29+1	4	2+1	1
10	MF	(Kazakhstan) KAZ	Duman Narzildaev	33	1	29	0	3+1	1
11	MF	(Armenia) ARM	Tigran Barseghyan	32	12	29	12	3	0
13	DF	(Kazakhstan) KAZ	Ilyas Amirseitov	31	1	29	1	2	0
15	MF	(Kazakhstan) KAZ	Shokhan Abzalov	14	1	3+8	1	1+2	0
17	MF	(Kazakhstan) KAZ	Bekzat Kurmanbekuly	2	0	0+1	0	1	0
18	FW	(Democratic Republic of the Congo) COD	Kule Mbombo	30	9	25+1	9	2+2	0
20	DF	(Belarus) BLR	Ivan Sadownichy	16	2	4+9	0	2+1	2
22	DF	(Kazakhstan) KAZ	Aleksandr Marochkin	32	2	30	2	2	0
27	MF	(Kazakhstan) KAZ	Samat Balymbetov	3	0	0+3	0	0	0
29	FW	(Kazakhstan) KAZ	Orken Makhan	10	1	0+10	1	0	0
33	DF	(Cameroon) CMR	Abdel Lamanje	31	2	29	2	2	0
55	DF	(Croatia) CRO	Ivan Graf	34	2	30	2	4	0
71	GK	(Kyrgyzstan) KGZ	Marsel Islamkulov	17	0	14	0	3	0
77	MF	(Democratic Republic of the Congo) COD	André Bukia	16	1	7+8	1	0+1	0
78	FW	(Belarus) BLR	Ihar Zyankovich	23	1	3+16	0	2+2	1
85	MF	(Cameroon) CMR	Clarence Bitang	14	0	10+3	0	1	0
86	MF	(Aruba) ARU	Joshua John	23	1	19+2	1	2	0
88	DF	(Kazakhstan) KAZ	Valentin Chureyev	11	0	7+2	0	2	0
Players away from Kaisar on loan:
Players who left Kaisar during the season:
7	MF	(Kazakhstan) KAZ	Maksat Baizhanov	21	1	13+6	1	1+1	0
19	MF	(Kazakhstan) KAZ	Marat Khairullin	16	0	9+7	0	0	0
77	MF	(Portugal) POR	Carlitos	7	0	0+5	0	2	0
87	FW	(Serbia) SRB	Bratislav Punoševac	16	2	5+8	1	1+2	1

=== Goal scorers ===
Place	Position	Nation	Number	Name	Premier League	Kazakhstan Cup	Total
1	MF	(Armenia)	11	Tigran Barseghyan	12	0	12
2	FW	(Democratic Republic of the Congo)	18	Kule Mbombo	9	0	9
3	MF	(Kazakhstan)	8	Askhat Tagybergen	4	1	5
4	DF	(Kazakhstan)	22	Aleksandr Marochkin	2	0	2
4	DF	(Croatia)	55	Ivan Graf	2	0	2
4	DF	(Cameroon)	33	Abdel Lamanje	2	0	2
4	FW	(Serbia)	87	Bratislav Punoševac	1	1	2
4	DF	(Belarus)	20	Ivan Sadownichy	0	2	2
9	MF	(Kazakhstan)	7	Maksat Baizhanov	1	0	1
9	MF	(Kazakhstan)	15	Shokhan Abzalov	1	0	1
9	MF	(Aruba)	86	Joshua John	1	0	1
9	FW	(Kazakhstan)	29	Orken Makhan	1	0	1
9	MF	(Democratic Republic of the Congo)	77	André Bukia	1	0	1
9	FW	(Belarus)	78	Ihar Zyankovich	0	1	1
9	MF	(Kazakhstan)	10	Duman Narzildaev	0	1	1
				TOTALS	37	6	43

=== Disciplinary record ===
Number	Nation	Position	Name	Premier League		Kazakhstan Cup		Total	
Number	Nation	Position	Name	Yellow card	Red card	Yellow card	Red card	Yellow card	Red card
1	(Kazakhstan)	GK	Aleksandr Grigorenko	3	0	0	0	3	0
5	(Kazakhstan)	DF	Mark Gorman	8	0	0	0	8	0
8	(Kazakhstan)	MF	Askhat Tagybergen	7	0	1	1	8	1
10	(Kazakhstan)	MF	Duman Narzildaev	9	0	0	0	9	0
11	(Armenia)	MF	Tigran Barseghyan	8	0	3	1	11	1
13	(Kazakhstan)	DF	Ilyas Amirseitov	5	0	0	0	5	0
15	(Kazakhstan)	MF	Shokhan Abzalov	2	0	1	0	3	0
18	(Democratic Republic of the Congo)	FW	Kule Mbombo	5	0	0	0	5	0
20	(Belarus)	DF	Ivan Sadownichy	5	1	0	0	5	1
22	(Kazakhstan)	DF	Aleksandr Marochkin	2	2	1	0	3	2
29	(Kazakhstan)	FW	Orken Makhan	2	0	0	0	2	0
33	(Cameroon)	DF	Abdel Lamanje	6	0	0	0	6	0
55	(Croatia)	DF	Ivan Graf	3	0	1	0	4	0
71	(Kyrgyzstan)	MF	Marsel Islamkulov	1	0	0	0	1	0
77	(Democratic Republic of the Congo)	MF	André Bukia	1	0	0	0	1	0
85	(Cameroon)	MF	Clarence Bitang	3	0	0	0	3	0
86	(Aruba)	MF	Joshua John	4	0	1	0	5	0
88	(Kazakhstan)	DF	Valentin Chureyev	4	0	0	0	4	0
Players who left Kaisar during the season:
7	(Kazakhstan)	MF	Maksat Baizhanov	1	0	0	0	1	0
19	(Kazakhstan)	MF	Marat Khairullin	1	0	0	0	1	0
77	(Portugal)	MF	Carlitos	1	0	2	0	3	0
87	(Serbia)	FW	Bratislav Punoševac	1	0	0	0	1	0
			TOTALS	82	3	10	2	92	5
