= 2018 FC Kaisar season =

FC Kaisar
2018 season
- Chairman: Nurlan Abuov
- Manager: Stoycho Mladenov
- Stadium: Gani Muratbayev Stadium
- Premier League: 9th
- Kazakhstan Cup: Quarterfinal vs Shakhter Karagandy
- Top goalscorer: League: Mathias Coureur (4); All: Mathias Coureur (4)
Home colours	Away colours

The 2018 FC Kaisar season is the club's second season back in the Kazakhstan Premier League, the highest tier of association football in Kazakhstan, and 21st in total. Kaisar will also participate in the Kazakhstan Cup.

== Squad ==
As of 4 July 2018

Note: Flags indicate national team as defined under FIFA eligibility rules; some limited exceptions apply. Players may hold more than one non-FIFA nationality.

No.	Pos.	Nation	Player
1	GK	KAZ	Aleksandr Grigorenko
3	DF	KAZ	Aldan Baltayev
5	DF	KAZ	Mark Gorman
7	MF	KAZ	Maksat Baizhanov
8	MF	KAZ	Askhat Tagybergen
9	MF	UKR	Volodymyr Arzhanov
10	MF	KAZ	Duman Narzildaev
13	DF	KAZ	Ilyas Amirseitov
17	MF	KEN	Paul Were
18	FW	KAZ	Daurenbek Tazhimbetov
19	MF	MTQ	Mathias Coureur
21	DF	KAZ	Aybol Zhakhayev

No.	Pos.	Nation	Player
22	DF	KAZ	Aleksandr Marochkin
23	MF	KAZ	Valeri Korobkin
25	MF	SLE	John Kamara
27	DF	KAZ	Dmitri Yevstigneyev
33	DF	CMR	Abdel Lamanje
55	DF	CRO	Ivan Graf
71	GK	KGZ	Marsel Islamkulov
77	FW	KAZ	Toktar Zhangylyshbay (loan from Tobol)
87	FW	SRB	Bratislav Punoševac
88	DF	KAZ	Valentin Chureyev
99	FW	CIV	Franck Dja Djedjé

== Transfers ==
=== Winter ===
In: Note: Flags indicate national team as defined under FIFA eligibility rules; some limited exceptions apply. Players may hold more than one non-FIFA nationality.

No.	Pos.	Nation	Player
5	DF	KAZ	Mark Gorman (from (Kazakhstan) Tobol)
8	MF	KAZ	Askhat Tagybergen (from (Kazakhstan) Astana)
17	MF	KEN	Paul Were (from (Greece) Kalamata)
18	FW	KAZ	Daurenbek Tazhimbetov (to (Kazakhstan) Atyrau)
22	DF	KAZ	Aleksandr Marochkin (from (Kazakhstan) Okzhetpes)
76	FW	MTQ	Yoann Arquin

Out: Note: Flags indicate national team as defined under FIFA eligibility rules; some limited exceptions apply. Players may hold more than one non-FIFA nationality.

No.	Pos.	Nation	Player
8	MF	KAZ	Ruslan Sakhalbayev
11	FW	KAZ	Elzhas Altynbekov (to (Kazakhstan) Zhetysu)
17	MF	KAZ	Zhambyl Kukeyev
22	DF	KAZ	Bauyrzhan Omarov (to (Kazakhstan) Akzhayik)
31	DF	KAZ	Aleksei Muldarov (to (Kazakhstan) Kyzylzhar)
39	MF	BDI	Saidi Ntibazonkiza
90	FW	SRB	Milan Bojović (to (Kazakhstan) Zhetysu)
—	DF	KAZ	Igor Nazarov (loan return to (Kazakhstan) Irtysh Pavlodar)

=== Summer ===
In: Note: Flags indicate national team as defined under FIFA eligibility rules; some limited exceptions apply. Players may hold more than one non-FIFA nationality.

No.	Pos.	Nation	Player
78	FW	BLR	Ihar Zyankovich (from (Kazakhstan) Atyrau)
87	FW	SRB	Bratislav Punoševac (from (Kazakhstan) Kyzylzhar)

Out: Note: Flags indicate national team as defined under FIFA eligibility rules; some limited exceptions apply. Players may hold more than one non-FIFA nationality.

No.	Pos.	Nation	Player
76	FW	MTQ	Yoann Arquin (to (England) Yeovil Town)

== Competitions ==
=== Premier League ===
==== Results summary ====
Overall								Home						Away					
Pld	W	D	L	GF	GA	GD	Pts	W	D	L	GF	GA	GD	W	D	L	GF	GA	GD
33	11	12	10	35	31	+4	45	5	7	4	17	15	+2	6	5	6	18	16	+2

Last updated: 11 November 2018.
Source: See Results

==== Results by round ====
Round	1	2	3	4	5	6	7	8	9	10	11	12	13	14	15	16	17	18	19	20	21	22	23	24	25	26	27	28	29	30	31	32	33
Ground	H	H	A	A	H	A	H	A	H	A	H	A	A	H	A	H	A	H	A	H	A	A	H	A	A	H	H	A	H	A	A	H	A
Result	L	D	L	L	D	L	D	W	W	D	D	D	L	D	W	L	W	D	D	W	L	L	W	D	D	W	L	L	D	W	W	W	W
Position	10	8	9	10	11	12	11	11	7	8	10	8	9	9	8	9	6	8	8	7	8	8	7	7	7	7	7	7	7	7	7	6	5

Source: See Results
A = Away; H = Home; W = Win; D = Draw; L = Loss

==== Results ====
11 March 2018 1	Kaisar	0 – 1	Aktobe	Kyzylorda
15:00 (UTC+6)	Djédjé (yellow card) 43'; Tagybergen (yellow card) 66'; Arquin (yellow card) 82'	Report	B.Kairov (yellow card) 64'; S.Adilzhanov (yellow card) 70'; A.Kakimov (yellow card) 73' (goal) 75' (pen.)	Stadium: Gani Muratbayev Stadium; Attendance: 3,000; Referee: Aleksandr Gauzer

17 March 2018 2	Kaisar	1 – 1	Akzhayik	Kyzylorda
15:00 (UTC+6)	I.Amirseitov (yellow card) 17'; Kamara (yellow card) 26'; Korobkin (yellow card) 52'; Coureur 54'; M.Islamkulov (yellow card) 77'	Report	I.Antipov (yellow card) 28'; Nurgaliyev 73'; M.Sapanov (yellow card) 85'	Stadium: Gani Muratbayev Stadium; Attendance: 3,000; Referee: Furkat Atajanov

31 March 2018 3	Astana	2 – 0	Kaisar	Astana
16:00 (UTC+6)	Twumasi 9'; Murtazayev 15'; Tomasov (yellow card) 63'	Report	Coureur (yellow card) 12'; Korobkin (yellow card) 76'; Graf (yellow card) 81'	Stadium: Astana Arena; Attendance: 3,500; Referee: Igor Chesnokov

7 April 2018 4	Zhetysu	1 – 0	Kaisar	Taldykorgan
15:00 (UTC+6)	R.Jalilov 24'; Mukhutdinov (yellow card) 26'; Kozhamberdi (yellow card) 85'	Report	I.Amirseitov (yellow card) 55'; Tagybergen (yellow card) 90+2'	Stadium: Zhetysu Reserve Stadium; Attendance: 800; Referee: Timur Kumashev

14 April 2018 5	Kaisar	0 – 0	Irtysh Pavlodar	Kyzylorda
16:00 (UTC+6)		Report	Avrămia (yellow card) 45'; Fonseca (yellow card) 64'	Stadium: Gani Muratbayev Stadium; Attendance: 3,000; Referee: Bagdat Abdullaev

22 April 2018 6	Kairat	4 – 1	Kaisar	Almaty
17:00 (UTC+6)	Isael 19'; Juan Felipe (yellow card) 53'; Arshavin 60'; Anene 76'; Lunin 90+3'	Report	Coureur 27'; Narzildaev (yellow card) 44'	Stadium: Central Stadium; Attendance: 10,200; Referee: Marat Iskakov

28 April 2018 7	Kaisar	0 – 0	Ordabasy	Kyzylorda
16:00 (UTC+6)	Korobkin (yellow card) 68'; Graf (yellow card) 88'	Report	Bertoglio (yellow card) 30'	Stadium: Gani Muratbayev Stadium; Attendance: 3,000; Referee: Denis Labashov

5 May 2018 8	Tobol	0 – 3	Kaisar	Kostanay
18:00 (UTC+6)	Šikov (yellow card) 34'; Darabayev (yellow card) 90+1'	Report	I.Amirseitov (yellow card) 9'; Zhangylyshbay (yellow card) 21' (goal) 37'; Narzildaev 47'; Coureur 82'	Stadium: Central Stadium; Attendance: 5,000; Referee: Bakhyt Kyzylbaev

9 May 2018 9	Kaisar	3 – 0	Shakhter Karagandy	Kyzylorda
17:00 (UTC+6)	Coureur 14'; Korobkin (yellow card) 52'; Dja Djédjé 80'; Lamanje 88'	Report	I.Pikalkin (yellow card) 72'	Stadium: Gani Muratbayev Stadium; Attendance: 3,000; Referee: Igor Aleshin

13 May 2018 10	Kyzylzhar	0 – 0	Kaisar	Petropavl
16:00 (UTC+6)	Venkov (yellow card) 45+1'; K.Sultanov (yellow card) 53'	Report	Kamara (yellow card) 18' (yellow-red card) 90+4'; Lamanje (yellow card) 22'; I.Amirseitov (yellow card) 39'	Stadium: Karasay Stadium; Attendance: 4,000; Referee: Aleksandr Aliyev

19 May 2018 11	Kaisar	0 – 0	Atyrau	Kyzylorda
17:00 (UTC+6)	Narzildaev (yellow card) 67'; Tagybergen (yellow card) 90+1'; Arzhanov (yellow card) 90+2'	Report	A.Nurybekov (yellow card) 52'; R.Dzumatov (yellow card) 59' (yellow-red card) 86'; A.Saparov (yellow card) 67'; A.Pasechenko (yellow card) 90+7'	Stadium: Gani Muratbayev Stadium; Attendance: 2,500; Referee: Saken Bayimbet

27 May 2018 12	Akzhayik	0 – 0	Kaisar	Oral
18:00 (UTC+6)	Basov (yellow card) 37'; Tkachuk (yellow card) 61'; Eseola (yellow card) 71'	Report	Zhangylyshbay (yellow card) 37'; Graf (yellow card) 55'	Stadium: Petr Atoyan Stadium; Attendance: 3,000; Referee: Grigory Moskovchenko

31 May 2018 13	Kaisar	0 – 2	Astana	Kyzylorda
18:00 (UTC+6)	Lamanje (yellow card) 16'	Report	Despotović (yellow card) 19'; Twumasi 22'; Muzhikov (yellow card) 41' (goal) 65'	Stadium: Gani Muratbayev Stadium; Attendance: 3,500; Referee: Denis Tevyashov

17 June 2018 14	Kaisar	0 – 0	Zhetysu	Kyzylorda
19:00 (UTC+6)	D.Yevstigneyev (yellow card) 33' (yellow-red card) 67'; Lamanje (yellow card) 39'; V.Chureyev (yellow card) 57'	Report	E.Altynbekov (yellow card) 27'; Sadownichy (yellow card) 16'; Mawutor (yellow card) 45+1'; Ibraev (yellow card) 52'	Stadium: Gani Muratbayev Stadium; Attendance: 2,000; Referee: Aydin Rakhimbayev

23 June 2018 15	Irtysh Pavlodar	0 – 1	Kaisar	Pavlodar
19:00 (UTC+6)	Fonseca (yellow card) 26'	Report	Korobkin (yellow card) 23'; Gorman (yellow card) 27'; Coureur (yellow card) 59'; Kamara (yellow card) 74'; Narzildaev 90'	Stadium: Central Stadium; Attendance: 3,000; Referee: Aleksasndr Gauzer

1 July 2018 16	Kaisar	1 – 2	Kairat	Kyzylorda
19:00 (UTC+6)	Baizhanov 60'; Narzildaev (yellow card) 77'	Report	Isael 64'; Islamkhan 90+4'	Stadium: Gani Muratbayev Stadium; Attendance: 2,500; Referee: Bolat Karlibayev

5 July 2018 17	Ordabasy	1 – 2	Kaisar	Shymkent
20:00 (UTC+6)	Diakate 9' (pen.) (yellow card) 87'; Bertoglio (yellow card) 49'; U.Zhaksybaev (yellow card) 56'; M.Tolebek (yellow card) 90+4'	Report	Narzildaev (yellow card) 42'; Coureur 57' (pen.); Were (yellow card) 69'; Tagybergen 77'; Baizhanov (yellow card) 82' (yellow-red card) 87'	Stadium: Kazhymukan Munaitpasov Stadium; Attendance: 2,300; Referee: Bakhyt Kyzylbaev

14 July 2018 18	Kaisar	2 – 2	Tobol	Kyzylorda
19:00 (UTC+6)	Tagybergen (yellow card) 27' (goal) 90+4'; Djédjé 89'; Graf (yellow card) 90+2'	Report	Kassaï (yellow card) 22'; Nurgaliev 27', 68' (yellow card) 65' (yellow-red card) 84'; Moldakaraev (yellow card) 42'; S.Zharynbetov (yellow card) 50'; S.Busurmanov (red card) 90'	Stadium: Gani Muratbayev Stadium; Attendance: 2,000; Referee: Furkat Atajanov

21 July 2018 19	Shakhter Karagandy	2 – 2	Kaisar	Karaganda
19:00 (UTC+6)	A.Duysen (yellow card) 59'; Tkachuk 64'; Shakhmetov 70'	Report	Punoševac 4' (yellow card) 60'; V.Chureyev (yellow card) 26'; Arzhanov 59' (pen.); I.Amirseitov (yellow card) 67'; Korobkin (yellow card) 81'	Stadium: Shakhter Stadium; Attendance: 500; Referee: Sergey Gorokhovodatskiy

28 July 2018 20	Kaisar	2 – 1	Kyzylzhar	Kyzylorda
18:30 (UTC+6)	Gorman (yellow card) 18' (goal) 29'; Coureur 37'; Korobkin (yellow card) 67'	Report	K.Sultanov (yellow card) 71'; Ceesay (yellow card) 78'; Lečić 90+3'	Stadium: Gani Muratbayev Stadium; Attendance: 2,000; Referee: Arman Ismuratov

4 August 2018 21	Atyrau	2 – 1	Kaisar	Atyrau
20:00 (UTC+6)	Adeniji 22' (yellow card) 70'; Khairullin (yellow card) 64' (goal) 90+5'; Barbarić (yellow card) 66'	Report	Narzildaev (yellow card) 68'; Graf (yellow card) 86'; Punoševac 88'	Stadium: Munaishy Stadium; Attendance: 3,000; Referee: Zhandos Abzhan

11 August 2018 22	Aktobe	3 – 1	Kaisar	Aktobe
21:00 (UTC+6)	Simčević (yellow card) 19' (goal) 68'; Valiullin 71'; R.Nurmukhametov (yellow card) 74'; Z.Kukeyev 90+7'	Report	Tagybergen (yellow card) 19' (yellow-red card) 76' (goal) 75' (pen.); Korobkin (yellow card) 76'; Graf (yellow card) 90'	Stadium: Central Stadium; Attendance: 11,500; Referee: Anatolyi Vishnichenko

19 August 2018 23	Kaisar	2 – 1	Ordabasy	Kyzylorda
18:00 (UTC+6)	Punoševac 34', 55'; Coureur (yellow card) 57'; Grigorenko (yellow card) 90+4'	Report	Diakate (yellow card) 45+1'; Moldakaraev (yellow card) 47'; Kojić 83'	Stadium: Gani Muratbayev Stadium; Attendance: 2,000; Referee: Denis Izmailov

25 August 2018 24	Tobol	0 – 0	Kaisar	Kostanay
19:00 (UTC+6)	Abilgazy (yellow card) 67'	Report	Punoševac (yellow card) 23'; A.Marochkin (yellow card) 25'; Kamara (yellow card) 57'	Stadium: Central Stadium; Attendance: 1,500; Referee: Aydin Rakhimbayev

16 September 2018 25	Astana	0 – 0	Kaisar	Astana
19:00 (UTC+6)		Report	Tagybergen (yellow card) 34'; Graf (yellow card) 57'; Were (yellow card) 63'; D.Yevstigneyev (yellow card) 90+3'	Stadium: Astana Arena; Attendance: 4,000; Referee: Grigory Moskovchenko

22 September 2018 27	Kaisar	2 – 1	Shakhter Karagandy	Kyzylorda
16:00 (UTC+6)	Tagybergen (yellow card) 24' (goal) 51' (pen.); Narzildaev (yellow card) 39'; Baizhanov (yellow card) 56'; Punoševac (yellow card) 71' (goal) 80'; I.Amirseitov (yellow card) 85'	Report	Vůch 23'; I.Pikalkin (yellow card) 41'; Y.Tarasov (yellow card) 50'; B.Kulbekov (yellow card) 55'	Stadium: Gani Muratbayev Stadium; Attendance: 2,200; Referee: Timur Kumashev

26 September 2018 25	Kaisar	1 – 2	Kairat	Kyzylorda
16:00 (UTC+6)	Punoševac (yellow card) 34'; Arzhanov 51'	Report	Eseola 25'; Paragulgov (yellow card) 27'; Iličević 35' (yellow card) 38'; Akhmetov (yellow card) 68' (yellow-red card) 76'	Stadium: Gani Muratbayev Stadium; Attendance: 2,800; Referee: Denis Tevyashov

30 September 2018 28	Kyzylzhar	1 – 0	Kaisar	Petropavl
15:00 (UTC+6)	T.Muldinov 15' (yellow card) 62'; Ceesay (yellow card) 30'; Tsirin (yellow card) 82'	Report	Narzildaev (yellow card) 35'; Coureur (yellow card) 62'; I.Amirseitov (yellow card) 64'; Baizhanov (yellow card) 90+3'	Stadium: Avangard Stadium; Attendance: 4,000; Referee: Arman Ismuratov

6 October 2018 29	Kaisar	2 – 2	Atyrau	Kyzylorda
16:00 (UTC+6)	Graf (yellow card) 16'; Narzildaev (yellow card) 21'; Punoševac (yellow card) 52'; Djédjé (yellow card) 55'; I.Amirseitov (yellow card) 73'; Tagybergen 78' (pen.); Lamanje 85'	Report	K.Kalmuratov (yellow card) 17'; Zhangylyshbay 67'; Barbarić (yellow card) 73'; A.Rodionov 87' (yellow card) 90+2'	Stadium: Gani Muratbayev Stadium; Attendance: 3,000; Referee: Georgiy Chekhovskiy

21 October 2018 30	Irtysh Pavlodar	0 – 1	Kaisar	Pavlodar
16:00 (UTC+6)	V.Vomenko (yellow card) 31'; Fonseca (yellow card) 74'	Report	A.Marochkin 20'; Kamara (yellow card) 34'; V.Chureyev (yellow card) 55'; Korobkin (yellow card) 62'; Arzhanov (yellow card) 90+2'	Stadium: Central Stadium; Attendance: 2,500; Referee: Bagdat Abdullaev

27 October 2018 31	Akzhayik	0 – 4	Kaisar	Oral
16:30 (UTC+6)	Chachua (yellow card) 37'; A.Ersalimov (yellow card) 57'	Report	Lamanje (yellow card) 32'; Punoševac 38'; Arzhanov 48'; Graf (yellow card) 55'; Coureur 60'; Narzildaev (yellow card) 67'; Zyankovich 90+3'	Stadium: Petr Atoyan Stadium; Attendance: 1,000; Referee: Artyom Kuchin

3 November 2018 32	Kaisar	1 – 0	Zhetysu	Kyzylorda
15:00 (UTC+6)	V.Chureyev (yellow card) 48'; Sadownichy 51' (o.g.); Baizhanov (yellow card) 54'; Tagybergen (yellow card) 89'	Report	Stepanyuk (red card) 88'; Lebedzew (yellow card) 89'	Stadium: Gani Muratbayev Stadium; Attendance: 2,500; Referee: Aleksandr Aliyev

11 November 2018 33	Aktobe	0 – 2	Kaisar	Aktobe
15:00 (UTC+6)	A.Aimbetov (yellow card) 20'; Radin (yellow card) 43'; Simčević (yellow card) 52'; S.Zhumagali (yellow card) 67'	Report	Zyankovich 17', 35'; Narzildaev (yellow card) 27'; I.Amirseitov (yellow card) 55'; Tagybergen (yellow card) 58'; Graf (yellow card) 78'; M.Islamkulov (yellow card) 87'	Stadium: Central Stadium; Attendance: 11,000; Referee: Aleksandr Gauzer

==== League table ====
Pos	Team	Pld	W	D	L	GF	GA	GD	Pts	Qualification or relegation
3	Tobol	33	15	8	10	36	30	+6	53	Qualification for the Europa League first qualifying round (Note: Since the winners of 2018 Kazakhstan Cup, Kairat, qualified for European competition based on their league position, the spot awarded to the Cup winner (Europa League first qualifying round) was passed to the next best-placed team (the fourth-placed team).)
4	Ordabasy	33	13	7	13	38	44	−6	46	Qualification for the Europa League first qualifying round
5	Kaisar	33	11	12	10	35	31	+4	45	
6	Zhetysu	33	11	10	12	36	40	−4	43	
7	Aktobe (Note: Aktobe had six points deducted on 27 April 2018 as a punishment for unpaid debts to former player Danilo Neco.)	33	13	9	11	51	47	+4	42	

Source: UEFA, Soccerway
Rules for classification: 1) Points; 2) Goal difference; 3) Matches won; 4) Goals scored; 5) Away goals scored; 6) Head-to-head points; 7) Head-to-head matches won; 8) Head-to-head goal difference; 9) Head-to-head goals scored; 10) Head-to-head away goals scored; 11) Draw.

=== Kazakhstan Cup ===
18 April 2018 Last 16	Kaisar	2 – 0	Aktobe	Kyzylorda
16:00 (UTC+6)	Korobkin 13'; Baizhanov (yellow card) 27'; Zhangylyshbay 34'; I.Amirseitov (yellow card) 71'; A.Marochkin (yellow card) 83'	Report	Valiullin (yellow card) 20'; Miličević (yellow card) 90'	Stadium: Gani Muratbayev Stadium; Attendance: 2,500; Referee: Sergey Gorokhovodetsky

23 May 2018 Quarterfinal	Shakhter Karagandy	2 – 1 (a.e.t.)	Kaisar	Temirtau
17:00 (UTC+6)	Tkachuk (yellow card) 33'; Sergei Shaff 56'; Najaryan (yellow card) 89'; Kojašević 119' (pen.)	Report	Kamara (yellow card) 35'; Dja Djédjé 41'; Arzhanov (yellow card) 88'; Zhangylyshbay (yellow card) 90+1'; Tazhimbetov (yellow card) 97'; Aybol Zhakhayev (yellow card) 119'	Stadium: Metallurg Stadium; Attendance: 500; Referee: Ruslan Omarov

== Squad statistics ==
As of match played 11 November 2018

=== Appearances and goals ===
No.	Pos	Nat	Player	Total		Premier League		Kazakhstan Cup	
No.	Pos	Nat	Player	Apps	Goals	Apps	Goals	Apps	Goals
1	GK	(Kazakhstan) KAZ	Aleksandr Grigorenko	19	0	18	0	1	0
3	DF	(Kazakhstan) KAZ	Aldan Baltayev	5	0	1+4	0	0	0
5	DF	(Kazakhstan) KAZ	Mark Gorman	20	1	12+7	1	0+1	0
7	MF	(Kazakhstan) KAZ	Maksat Baizhanov	23	1	19+3	1	1	0
8	MF	(Kazakhstan) KAZ	Askhat Tagybergen	25	5	20+4	5	1	0
9	MF	(Ukraine) UKR	Volodymyr Arzhanov	29	3	24+3	3	0+2	0
10	MF	(Kazakhstan) KAZ	Duman Narzildaev	29	2	26+2	2	1	0
13	DF	(Kazakhstan) KAZ	Ilyas Amirseitov	30	0	28	0	2	0
17	MF	(Kenya) KEN	Paul Were	24	0	9+13	0	2	0
18	FW	(Kazakhstan) KAZ	Daurenbek Tazhimbetov	7	0	1+5	0	1	0
19	MF	(Martinique) MTQ	Mathias Coureur	28	7	27	7	1	0
21	DF	(Kazakhstan) KAZ	Aybol Zhakhayev	3	0	1+1	0	1	0
22	DF	(Kazakhstan) KAZ	Aleksandr Marochkin	22	1	19+1	1	2	0
23	MF	(Kazakhstan) KAZ	Valeri Korobkin	26	1	19+5	0	1+1	1
25	MF	(Sierra Leone) SLE	John Kamara	24	0	6+16	0	1+1	0
27	DF	(Kazakhstan) KAZ	Dmitri Yevstigneyev	12	0	9+3	0	0	0
33	DF	(Cameroon) CMR	Abdel Lamanje	28	2	27	2	1	0
55	DF	(Croatia) CRO	Ivan Graf	33	0	31	0	2	0
71	GK	(Kyrgyzstan) KGZ	Marsel Islamkulov	16	0	15	0	1	0
77	MF	(Kazakhstan) KAZ	Toktar Zhangylyshbay	17	2	11+4	1	1+1	1
78	FW	(Belarus) BLR	Ihar Zyankovich	10	3	4+6	3	0	0
87	FW	(Serbia) SRB	Bratislav Punoševac	13	6	13	6	0	0
88	DF	(Kazakhstan) KAZ	Valentin Chureyev	17	0	15+2	0	0	0
99	FW	(Ivory Coast) CIV	Franck Dja Djédjé	18	3	6+11	2	1	1
Players away from Kaisar on loan:
Players who left Kaisar during the season:
76	FW	(Martinique) MTQ	Yoann Arquin	8	0	2+5	0	1	0

=== Goal scorers ===
Place	Position	Nation	Number	Name	Premier League	Kazakhstan Cup	Total
1	MF	(Martinique)	19	Mathias Coureur	7	0	7
2	FW	(Serbia)	87	Bratislav Punoševac	6	0	6
3	MF	(Kazakhstan)	8	Askhat Tagybergen	5	0	5
4	MF	(Ukraine)	9	Volodymyr Arzhanov	3	0	3
4	FW	(Belarus)	78	Ihar Zyankovich	3	0	3
4	FW	(Ivory Coast)	99	Franck Dja Djédjé	2	1	3
7	MF	(Kazakhstan)	10	Duman Narzildaev	2	0	2
7	DF	(Cameroon)	33	Abdel Lamanje	2	0	2
7	MF	(Kazakhstan)	77	Toktar Zhangylyshbay	1	1	2
10	MF	(Kazakhstan)	7	Maksat Baizhanov	1	0	1
10	DF	(Kazakhstan)	5	Mark Gorman	1	0	1
10	DF	(Kazakhstan)	22	Aleksandr Marochkin	1	0	1
10	MF	(Kazakhstan)	23	Valeri Korobkin	0	1	1
10				Own goal	1	0	1
				TOTALS	35	3	38

=== Disciplinary record ===
Number	Nation	Position	Name	Premier League		Kazakhstan Cup		Total	
Number	Nation	Position	Name	Booked	Sent off (straight red)	Booked	Sent off (straight red)	Booked	Sent off (straight red)
1	(Kazakhstan)	GK	Aleksandr Grigorenko	1	0	0	0	1	0
5	(Kazakhstan)	DF	Mark Gorman	2	0	0	0	2	0
7	(Kazakhstan)	MF	Maksat Baizhanov	5	1	1	0	6	1
8	(Kazakhstan)	MF	Askhat Tagybergen	10	1	0	0	10	1
9	(Ukraine)	MF	Volodymyr Arzhanov	2	0	1	0	3	0
10	(Kazakhstan)	MF	Duman Narzildaev	10	0	0	0	10	0
13	(Kazakhstan)	DF	Ilyas Amirseitov	9	0	1	0	10	0
17	(Kenya)	MF	Paul Were	2	0	0	0	2	0
18	(Kazakhstan)	FW	Daurenbek Tazhimbetov	0	0	1	0	1	0
19	(Martinique)	MF	Mathias Coureur	4	0	0	0	4	0
21	(Kazakhstan)	DF	Aybol Zhakhayev	0	0	1	0	1	0
22	(Kazakhstan)	DF	Aleksandr Marochkin	1	0	1	0	2	0
23	(Kazakhstan)	MF	Valeri Korobkin	9	0	0	0	9	0
25	(Sierra Leone)	MF	John Kamara	7	1	0	0	7	1
27	(Kazakhstan)	DF	Dmitri Yevstigneyev	2	0	0	0	2	0
33	(Cameroon)	DF	Abdel Lamanje	4	0	0	0	4	0
55	(Croatia)	DF	Ivan Graf	10	0	0	0	10	0
71	(Kyrgyzstan)	GK	Marsel Islamkulov	2	0	0	0	2	0
77	(Kazakhstan)	MF	Toktar Zhangylyshbay	2	0	1	0	3	0
87	(Serbia)	FW	Bratislav Punoševac	4	0	0	0	4	0
88	(Kazakhstan)	DF	Valentin Chureyev	4	0	0	0	4	0
99	(Ivory Coast)	FW	Franck Dja Djédjé	2	0	0	0	2	0
Players who left Kaisar during the season:
76	(Martinique)	FW	Yoann Arquin	1	0	0	0	1	0
			TOTALS	95	4	8	0	103	4
