= Mark Gurman (footballer) =

Kazakhstani footballer

Personal information
- Full name: Mark Mikhaylovich Gurman
- Date of birth: 9 February 1989 (age 37)
- Place of birth: Alma-Ata, Soviet Union
- Height: 1.88 m (6 ft 2 in)
- Position: Defender

Team information
- Current team: Kyzylzhar
- Number: 4

Youth career
- 2006–2008: Beitar Nes Tubruk

Senior career*
Years	Team	Apps	(Gls)
2008–2010	Hapoel Petah Tikva	16	(0)
2009–2010	→ Maccabi Ahi Nazareth (loan)	29	(0)
2010–2011	Lokomotiv Astana	43	(1)
2012–2015	Kairat	104	(1)
2016	Astana	6	(0)
2016–2017	Tobol	15	(0)
2018–2020	Kaisar	62	(1)
2021	Astana	12	(0)
2022	Kyzylzhar	10	(0)

International career
2010–2014	Kazakhstan	26	(0)
- * Club domestic league appearances and goals

Mark Mikhaylovich Gurman (Russian: Марк Михайлович Гурман; Hebrew: מרק גורמן; born 9 February 1989) is a Kazakhstani former professional association football player who played for Kyzylzhar and the Kazakhstan national team.

== Club career ==
Gurman made aliyah at the age of fourteen without his parents. He was scouted by Shlomo Scharf who brought him to Israel as part of a project for young Jews to make aliyah without their parents.

Gurman left FC Kairat in November 2015 after four seasons with the club. In February 2016, Gurman signed for Champions FC Astana.

On 31 January 2018, Kaisar announced the signing of Gurman on a one-year contract.

== Career statistics ==
=== Club ===
As of match played 5 September 2022

Appearances and goals by club, season and competition
Club	Season	League			National Cup		League Cup		Continental		Other		Total	
Club	Season	Division	Apps	Goals	Apps	Goals	Apps	Goals	Apps	Goals	Apps	Goals	Apps	Goals
Hapoel Petah Tikva	2008–09	Ligat Ha`Al	14	0	1	0	5	1	-		-		20	1
Hapoel Petah Tikva	2009–10	Ligat Ha`Al	2	0	0	0	3	0	-		-		5	0
Hapoel Petah Tikva	Total		16	0	1	0	8	1	-	-	-	-	25	1
Maccabi Ahi Nazareth (loan)	2009–10	Ligat Ha`Al	29	0	0	0	0	0	—		—		29	0
Astana	2010	Kazakhstan Premier League	12	0	4	0	—		—		—		16	0
Astana	2011	Kazakhstan Premier League	31	1	1	0	—		—		1 (Note: Appearance in the Kazakhstan Super Cup)	0	33	1
Astana	Total		43	1	5	0	-	-	-	-	1	0	49	1
Kairat	2012	Kazakhstan Premier League	25	0	3	0	—		—		—		28	0
Kairat	2013	Kazakhstan Premier League	28	1	2	0	—		—		—		30	1
Kairat	2014	Kazakhstan Premier League	23	0	5	0	—		3 (Note: Appearances in the UEFA Europa League)	0	—		31	0
Kairat	2015	Kazakhstan Premier League	28	0	5	1	—		7	0	1	0	41	1
Kairat	Total		104	1	15	1	-	-	10	0	1	0	130	2
Astana	2016	Kazakhstan Premier League	6	0	2	0	—		0 (Note: 0 appearances in the UEFA Champions League and 0 appearances in the UEFA Europa League)	0	1	0	9	0
Tobol	2016	Kazakhstan Premier League	14	0	0	0	—		—		—		14	0
Tobol	2017	Kazakhstan Premier League	1	0	0	0	—		—		—		1	0
Tobol	Total		15	0	0	0	-	-	-	-	-	-	15	0
Kaisar	2018	Kazakhstan Premier League	19	1	1	0	—		—		—		20	1
Kaisar	2019	Kazakhstan Premier League	26	0	3	0	—		—		—		29	0
Kaisar	2020	Kazakhstan Premier League	17	0	0	0	—		1	0	0	0	18	0
Kaisar	Total		62	1	4	0	-	-	1	0	0	0	67	1
Astana	2021	Kazakhstan Premier League	12	0	6	0	—		2 (Note: Appearances in the UEFA Europa Conference League)	0	0	0	20	0
Kyzylzhar	2022	Kazakhstan Premier League	10	0	5	0	—		4	0	0	0	19	0
Career total			297	3	38	1	8	1	17	0	3	0	363	5

=== International ===
Kazakhstan
Year	Apps	Goals
2011	4	0
2012	4	0
2013	8	0
2014	3	0
2015	7	0
Total	26	0

Statistics accurate as of match played 13 October 2015

== Honours ==
Astana

- Kazakhstan Cup (1): 2010

Kairat

- Kazakhstan Cup (1): 2014

Kaisar

- Kazakhstan Cup (1): 2019
