= 2019 Kazakhstan Cup =

Tournament details
- Country: Kazakhstan
- Teams: 26

Final positions
- Champions: Kaisar
- Runners-up: Atyrau

Tournament statistics
- Matches played: 35
- Goals scored: 97 (2.77 per match)
- Top goal scorer: Four Players (3)

The 2019 Kazakhstan Cup was the 28th season of the Kazakhstan Cup, the annual nationwide football cup competition of Kazakhstan since the independence of the country. FC Kaisar defeated FC Atyrau in the final on 6 October 2019 to win their second Kazakhstan Cup.

== Participating clubs ==
The following 26 teams qualified for the competition:

| Premier League all clubs of season 2019 | First Division; Eight clubs of season 2019 | Second Division; Six clubs of season 2019 |
| Aktobe; Astana; Atyrau; Irtysh Pavlodar; Kairat; Kaisar; Okzhetpes; Ordabasy; Shakhter Karagandy; Taraz; Tobol; Zhetysu | Akademiya Ontustik; Akzhayik; Altai Semey; Caspiy; Ekibastuz; Kyran; Kyzylzhar; Makhtaaral | FC Aksu; Arys; Didara Sıdıkbeka; FC Igilik; Ruzaevka; SDYuShOR 8 |

== Group stages ==
=== Group A ===
| Pos | Team | Pld | W | D | L | GF | GA | GD | Pts | Qualification |
|---|---|---|---|---|---|---|---|---|---|---|
| 1 | Altai Semey | 3 | 2 | 1 | 0 | 5 | 0 | +5 | 7 | Advanced to Last 16 |
| 2 | Kyzylzhar | 3 | 1 | 2 | 0 | 6 | 1 | +5 | 5 | |
| 3 | Ekibastuz | 3 | 1 | 1 | 1 | 3 | 2 | +1 | 4 | |
| 4 | FC Ruzaevka | 3 | 0 | 0 | 3 | 0 | 11 | −11 | 0 | |

Updated to match(es) played on 27 March 2019. Source: PFLK

| 19 March 2019 | Altai Semey | 4 – 0 | Ruzaevka | Shymkent |
| 15:00 (UTC+6) | Noyan Auganov 10' (o.g.); Vladimir Vyatkin 70'; Nursultan Sovetkazy (yellow card) 78'; Duman Tursynbay 85', 90' | Report | Esenzhol Berdibek (yellow card) 38' | Stadium: Namys Stadium; Attendance: 150; Referee: Mikhail Bildinov |

| 19 March 2019 | Ekibastuz | 1 – 1 | Kyzylzhar | Shymkent |
| 15:00 (UTC+6) | Aslan Yerken 15'; Kurmet Karaman (yellow card) 33'; Serikbol Kapanov (yellow card) 75' | Report | Bakdaulet Kozhabaev (yellow card) 55'; Delić (yellow card) 51' (goal) 80'; Elmar Nabiyev (yellow card) 77' | Stadium: BIIK Stadium; Attendance: 200; Referee: Alexander Zatula |

| 22 March 2019 | Ruzaevka | 0 – 5 | Kyzylzhar | Shymkent |
| 15:00 (UTC+6) | Diaskhan Mankeev (yellow card) 48'; Kaynar Almabek (yellow card) 77'; Nursultan Turlygulov (yellow card) 84' | Report | Pavel Kriventsov 16'; Kozhabaev Bakdaulet (penalty missed) 26 (yellow card) 84'; Danil Choi 32'; Viktor Gunchenko (yellow card) 48' (goal) 74'; Yerasyl Seitkanov (yellow card) 76'; Elmar Nabiev 78'; Vsevolod Koloda 82' | Stadium: BIIK Stadium; Attendance: 50; Referee: Denis Tevyashov |

| 22 March 2019 | Altai Semey | 1 – 0 | Ekibastuz | Shymkent |
| 15:00 (UTC+6) | Duman Tursynbay 34'; Evgeny Goryachiy (yellow card) 43'; Vladimir Vyatkin (yellow card) 90+1' | Report | Aset Doskaliev (yellow card) 20'; Akmal Aymenov (yellow card) 22'; Sumit Chulagov (yellow card) 86'; Kurmet Karaman (yellow card) 88' | Stadium: BIIK Stadium; Attendance: 200; Referee: George Çehovskiy |

| 25 March 2019 | Ekibastuz | 2 – 0 | Ruzaevka | Shymkent |
| 17:00 (UTC+6) | Adil Janiliev (yellow card) 42' (yellow-red card) 50'; Aslan Suleimenov (yellow card) 45+2'; Akmal Aymenov (yellow card) 62'; Islam Nartbayev (yellow card) 82'; Sumit Chulagov 86' (yellow card) 89'; Islam Nartbayev 90+2' | Report | Aisultan Seidakhmet (yellow card) 54'; Islam Yunusov (yellow card) 57' | Stadium: BIIK Stadium; Attendance: 100; Referee: Sergey Gorokhovodatsky |

| 25 March 2019 | Kyzylzhar | 0 – 0 | Altai Semey | Shymkent |
| 17:00 (UTC+6) | Yerasyl Seitkanov (yellow card) 50' | Report | Anuar Umazhev (yellow card) 37'; Anuar Sapargaliev (yellow card) 87'; Vyacheslav Serdyukov (yellow card) 90+5' | Stadium: BIIK Stadium; Attendance: 300; Referee: Rustam Omarov |

=== Group B ===
| Pos | Team | Pld | W | D | L | GF | GA | GD | Pts | Qualification |
|---|---|---|---|---|---|---|---|---|---|---|
| 1 | Akademiya Ontustik | 3 | 3 | 0 | 0 | 10 | 0 | +10 | 9 | Advanced to Last 16 |
| 2 | SDYuShOR 8 | 3 | 2 | 0 | 1 | 12 | 6 | +6 | 6 | |
| 3 | Arys | 3 | 0 | 1 | 2 | 3 | 10 | −7 | 1 | |
| 4 | Didara Sıdıkbeka | 3 | 0 | 1 | 2 | 1 | 10 | −9 | 1 | |

Updated to match(es) played on 27 March 2019. Source: PFLK

| 20 March 2019 | Arys | 0 – 0 | Didara Sıdıkbeka | Arys |
| 15:00 (UTC+6) | Erkasym Eschenkul (yellow card) 41'; Gafurzhan Nazarov (yellow card) 59'; Shodier Bulishev (yellow card) 75' | Report | Didar Sydykbek (yellow card) 23'; Nursultan Baigazy (yellow card) 41' | Stadium: Central Stadium; Attendance: 2,000; Referee: Maxim Bogdanov |

| 20 March 2019 | SDYuShOR 8 | 0 – 2 | Akademiya Ontustik | Shymkent |
| 15:00 (UTC+6) | Wildam Nasibullin (yellow card) 73' | Report | Vadim Afanasenko 24'; Hamit Shamil (red card) 35'; Boris Fomenkov 44'; Bekzat Imangazeev (yellow card) 81'; Askat Ermekuulu (yellow card) 88' | Stadium: BIIK Stadium; Attendance: 150; Referee: Sergey Nogozhenko |

| 23 March 2019 | Arys | 3 – 4 | SDYuShOR 8 | Arys |
| 15:00 (UTC+6) | Gafurzhan Nazarov (yellow card) 58'; Elyor Samarov 83'; Erkasym Yeshenkul 85', 90' | Report | Ilya Burtovoy (yellow card) 31'; Nurzhan Kuanyshkaliev 58', 70'; Victor Pron 73', 90+3' | Stadium: Central Stadium; Attendance: 1,500; Referee: Anton Kuchma |

| 23 March 2019 | Didara Sıdıkbeka | 0 – 2 | Akademiya Ontustik | Shymkent |
| 19:00 (UTC+6) | Yerzhan Askarov (yellow card) 53'; Askat Ermekuulu (yellow card) 89' | Report | Aibek Mirabzalov (yellow card) 64'; Galymzhan Ermurzaev 84'; Alijar Mohammad 87' | Stadium: BIIK Stadium; Attendance: 100; Referee: Daniyar Kurbanov |

| 26 March 2019 | SDYuShOR 8 | 8 – 1 | Didara Sıdıkbeka | Shymkent |
| 15:00 (UTC+6) | Azamat Khasenov 5', 54'; Wildam Nasibullin 31', 74'; Oraz Saylybayev (yellow card) 42'; Nurzhan Kuanyshkaliev 55'; Abilkair Ismailov (yellow card) 57'; Daulet Yesbergenov 60', 70'; Arsen Yelemesov 77' | Report | Aykhan Kozhabekov 44'; Alexander Berg (yellow card) 90+3' | Stadium: BIIK Stadium; Attendance: 50; Referee: Zhandos Abzhan |

| 26 March 2019 | Akademiya Ontustik | 6 – 0 | Arys | Shymkent |
| 17:00 (UTC+6) | Boris Fomenkov 57'; Alijar Mohammad 60', 88'; Altynbek Daulethanov 70'; Yerkebulan Amangeldy 75' (pen.); Zhandos Kuandykov 82' | Report | | Stadium: BIIK Stadium; Attendance: 150; Referee: Andrew Marsal |

=== Group C ===
| Pos | Team | Pld | W | D | L | GF | GA | GD | Pts | Qualification |
|---|---|---|---|---|---|---|---|---|---|---|
| 1 | Aksu | 2 | 1 | 0 | 1 | 4 | 3 | +1 | 3 | Advanced to Last 16 |
| 2 | Kyran | 2 | 1 | 0 | 1 | 4 | 4 | 0 | 3 | |
| 3 | Igilik | 2 | 1 | 0 | 1 | 3 | 4 | −1 | 3 | |

Updated to match(es) played on 27 March 2019. Source: PFLK

| 21 March 2019 | Igilik | 2 – 1 | Aksu | Shymkent |
| 15:00 (UTC+6) | Daniyar Bayaliev (yellow card) 29'; Shyngys Rysbek 55'; Ruslan Ordabek (yellow card) 59'; Said Muzarapov 63' (pen.); Askhat Shulenbai (yellow card) 90+4' | Report | Valery Lenkov (yellow card) 45+1'; Nursultan Taszhanov 52'; Temir Baysufinov (yellow card) 54'; Zhenis Alpysbayev (yellow card) 76'; Vladislav Chernyshov (yellow card) 86' | Stadium: BIIK Stadium; Attendance: 200; Referee: Sayat Karabaev |

| 24 March 2019 | Kyran | 3 – 1 | Igilik | Shymkent |
| 15:00 (UTC+6) | Bekzhan Abdrahman 33' (pen.), 90+4'; Aidar Zhaksybek (yellow card) 59'; Kirill Pasichnik 89' | Report | Said Muzarapov 16'; Dmitriy Evstigneev (yellow card) 27'; Daniyar Bayaliev (yellow card) 37' (yellow-red card) 39' Eleman Tulegenov (yellow card) 59' | Stadium: BIIK Stadium; Attendance: 300; Referee: Danil Gorda |

| 27 March 2019 | Aksu | 3 – 1 | Kyran | Shymkent |
| 15:00 (UTC+6) | Magyar Ramazanov 13'; Amir Muralinov 51'; Valery Lenkov 54' | Report | Sirbay Maulen (yellow card) 24'; Nursayin Zholdasov 42'; Kirill Pasichnik (yellow card) 57'; Aydar Zhaksybek (penalty missed) 76'; Danabek Kuanyshbai (yellow card) 80' | Stadium: BIIK Stadium; Attendance: 250; Referee: Elvira Nurmustafina |

=== Group D ===
| Pos | Team | Pld | W | D | L | GF | GA | GD | Pts | Qualification |
|---|---|---|---|---|---|---|---|---|---|---|
| 1 | Caspiy | 2 | 1 | 1 | 0 | 1 | 0 | +1 | 4 | Advanced to Last 16 |
| 2 | Makhtaaral | 2 | 1 | 0 | 1 | 2 | 2 | 0 | 3 | |
| 3 | Akzhayik | 2 | 0 | 1 | 1 | 1 | 2 | −1 | 1 | |

Updated to match(es) played on 27 March 2019. Source: PFLK

| 21 March 2019 | Caspiy | 1 – 0 | Makhtaaral | Shymkent |
| 17:00 (UTC+6) | Kolunija (yellow card) 2'; Kuandyk Nursultanov (yellow card) 24' (yellow-red card) 46'; Amandyk Nabikhanov (yellow card) 63'; Ruslan Zhanysbaev (yellow card) 65'; Vorotnikov 86' | Report | Edige Oralbay (yellow card) 39'; Evgeny Levin (yellow card) 90+3' | Stadium: BIIK Stadium; Attendance: 150; Referee: Bolat Karlibaev |

| 24 March 2019 | Akzhayik | 0 – 0 | Caspiy | Shymkent |
| 17:00 (UTC+6) | Erbolat Rustemov (red card) 25'; Rashid Lyuhai (yellow card) 78' | Report | Yerlan Kadyrbayev (red card) 22'; Čubrilo (yellow card) 38' | Stadium: BIIK Stadium; Attendance: 200; Referee: Saken Baymbet |

| 27 March 2019 | Makhtaaral | 2 – 1 | Akzhayik | Shymkent |
| 16:00 (UTC+6) | Adilet Abdenabi 8' (pen.); Edige Oralbay (yellow card) 14'; Oleg Nedashkovsky (yellow card) 29'; Anuar Zhagippar (yellow card) 47'; Beknur Ryskul 70'; Damir Aymagambetov (yellow card) 83' | Report | Tazhimbetov 3'; Sergey Basov (yellow card) 84' | Stadium: Kazhymukan Munaitpasov Stadium; Attendance: 100; Referee: Arman Iamuratov |

== Last 16 ==
| 10 April 2019 | Akademiya Ontustik | 1 – 2 (a.e.t.) | Kaisar | Shymkent |
| 15:00 (UTC+6) | Kanat Karimolla 26'; Aliyar Mukhamed (yellow card) 46'; Igor Chervov (yellow card) 110' (yellow-red card) 112'; Galymzhan Ermurzaev (yellow card) 116' | Report | Carlitos (yellow card) 19'; Sadownichy 31'; Barseghyan (yellow card) 45' (red card) 45'; Punoševac 106' | Stadium: BIIK Stadium; Attendance: 200; Referee: Arman Ismuratov |

| 10 April 2019 | Aktobe | 3 – 3 (a.e.t.) (1 – 3 p) | Irtysh Pavlodar | Kostanay |
| 14:00 (UTC+6) | Aimbetov 27', 64'; Kairov (yellow card) 32'; Miličević (yellow card) 56' (goal) 111'; Volkov (yellow card) 75'; Radin (yellow card) 99' | Report | Cañas 17'; Lunin 51'; Dubra 105' | Stadium: Central Stadium; Attendance: 500; Referee: Anatoly Vishnichenko |
| | Penalties |
| | Miličević (penalty scored); Aimbetov (penalty missed); Volkov (penalty missed); Radin (penalty missed) | | (penalty scored) Cañas; (penalty scored) Vitas; (penalty scored) Fonseca; (penalty missed) Artem Popov |
Note: Match played at Tobol's Central Stadium in Kostanay, instead of Aktobes regular Central Stadium in Aktobe.

| 10 April 2019 | Okzhetpes | 0 – 1 | Ordabasy | Kokshetau |
| 15:00 (UTC+6) | S.Zhumakhanov (yellow card) 38'; Kislitsyn (yellow card) 39'; Stojanović (yellow card) 55'; Kasmynin (yellow card) 82' | Report | Vitali Li (yellow card) 23'; Erlanov (yellow card) 65' (goal) 75' | Stadium: Okzhetpes Stadium; Attendance: 2,700; Referee: Bakhyt Kyzylbaev |

| 10 April 2019 | Altai Semey | 1 – 1 (a.e.t.) (15 – 14 p) | Astana | Oskemen |
| 15:00 (UTC+6) | Anuar Umashev 64' | Report | Muzhikov 25'; Ravil Ibragimov (yellow card) 76'; Didar Zhalmukan (yellow card) 110' | Stadium: Vostok Stadium; Attendance: 4,500; Referee: Zhandos Abzhan |
| | Penalties |
| | Anuar Umashev (penalty scored); Vladimir Vyatkin (penalty scored); N.Sovetkazy (penalty scored); Bilyi (penalty scored); Dudkin (penalty scored); Mukhit Zhaksylyk (penalty scored); Podprugin (penalty scored); D.Kenzhegulov (penalty scored); T.Adulhanov (penalty scored); Aleksei Shakin (penalty scored); Anuar Sapargaliev (penalty scored); Anuar Umashev (penalty scored); Vladimir Vyatkin (penalty scored); N.Sovetkazy (penalty scored); Bilyi (penalty scored) | | (penalty scored) Beisebekov; (penalty scored) Shomko; (penalty scored) Didar Zhalmukan; (penalty scored) Ramazan Karimov; (penalty scored) Muzhikov; (penalty scored) Šimunović; (penalty scored) Sultan Sagnayev; (penalty scored) Lev Skvortsov; (penalty scored) Rotariu; (penalty scored) Kabananga; (penalty scored) Mokin; (penalty scored) Beisebekov; (penalty scored) Shomko; (penalty scored) Didar Zhalmukan; (penalty missed) Ramazan Karimov |
Note: Match played at Vostok's Vostok Stadium in Oskemen, instead of Altai Semey's regular Spartak Stadium in Semey.

| 10 April 2019 | Caspiy | 1 – 1 (a.e.t.) (5 – 6 p) | Kairat | Aktau |
| 16:00 (UTC+6) | Talgat Kusyapov (yellow card) 19'; Vorotnikov (yellow card) 33'; Ruslan Zhanysbaev (yellow card) 51'; Rinat Khayrullin 58' | Report | Alip (red card) 12'; Astanov 18'; Akhmetov (red card) 28'; Abiken (yellow card) 55' | Stadium: Zhastar Stadium; Attendance: 4,000; Referee: Denis Tevyashov |
| | Penalties |
| | Kuanysh Begalin (penalty missed); Čubrilo (penalty scored); Rinat Khayrullin (penalty scored); Bekzat Kabylan (penalty scored); Talgat Kusyapov (penalty scored); Kirill Shestakov (penalty scored); Gabyshev (penalty missed); O.Mukhanov (penalty missed) | | (penalty scored) Abiken; (penalty scored) Adam Adakhajiev; (penalty scored) Aleksandr Sokolenko; (penalty missed) Artur Shushenachev; (penalty scored) Suyumbayev; (penalty scored) Madi Aitore; (penalty scored) Shvyrev; (penalty scored) Aibarr Nurdaliyev |

| 10 April 2019 | Aksu | 0 – 3 | Tobol | Pavlodar |
| 17:00 (UTC+6) | Chernyshov (yellow card) 23'; Matvey Matvienko (yellow card) 55'; Temir Baysufinov (red card) 90' | Report | Turysbek 47', 66'; Nurgaliev 68' | Stadium: Central Stadium; Attendance: 1,800; Referee: Ruslan Omarov |

| 10 April 2019 | Taraz | 2 – 0 | Shakhter Karagandy | Taraz |
| 18:00 (UTC+6) | Gavril Kan 8'; Nyuiadzi (+90+1) | Report | Najaryan (yellow card) 34'; Skorykh (yellow card) 45'; Tkachuk (yellow card) 80'; Droppa (yellow card) 83'; Yevgeny Tarasov (yellow card) 89' | Stadium: Central Stadium; Attendance: 4,000; Referee: Sergey Nozhenko |

| 10 April 2019 | Atyrau | 1 – 0 | Zhetysu | Astana |
| 19:00 (UTC+6) | Bjedov (yellow card) 26'; Kubík (yellow card) 54'; Alexey Rodionov 78' | Report | Mawutor (red card) 41' | Stadium: Astana Arena; Attendance: 500; Referee: Aleksandr Zatula |
Note: Match played at Astana's Astana Arena in Astana, instead of Atyrau's regular Munaishy Stadium in Atyrau.

== Quarterfinal ==
| 8 May 2019 | Altai Semey | 1 – 1 (a.e.t.) (1 – 3 p) | Atyrau | Semey |
| 15:00 (UTC+6) | Vladimir Vyatkin 49'; Marat Damir (yellow card) 57' (yellow-red card) 99'; Aleksey Shakin (yellow card) 102' | Report | Rinat Dzhumatov 12'; Eldar Abdrakhmanov (yellow card) 45+1'; Sergienko (yellow card) 64'; Ivančić (yellow card) 119' | Stadium: Spartak Stadium; Attendance: 3,000; Referee: Daniyar Sahi |
| | Penalties |
| | Anuar Umashev (penalty scored); Vladimir Vyatkin (penalty missed); Constantin Bernatsky (penalty missed); Almas Sapargaliev (penalty missed) | | Sergienko (penalty missed); Andrey Shabaev (penalty scored); Ivančić (penalty scored); Tkachuk (penalty missed); Kuanysh Kalmuratov (penalty scored) |

| 8 May 2019 | Taraz | 0 – 1 | Ordabasy | Taraz |
| 16:00 (UTC+6) | Alisher Suley (yellow card) 57'; Elivelto (yellow card) 80'; Bekzat Beisenov (yellow card) 90+4' | Report | Maxim Vaganov 6'; Bystrov (yellow card) 59' | Stadium: Central Stadium; Attendance: 3,000; Referee: Timur Koumashev |

| 8 May 2019 | Irtysh Pavlodar | 1 – 2 | Kaisar | Pavlodar |
| 18:30 (UTC+6) | Paragulgov 15'; Manzorro (yellow card) 36'; Fonseca (yellow card) 49'; Sagadat Tursynbay (yellow card) 55' | Report | Carlitos (yellow card) 26'; Shokhan Abzalov (yellow card) 61'; Sadownichy 69'; Tagybergen 88' | Stadium: Central Stadium; Attendance: 2,000; Referee: Alexander Gauzer |

| 8 May 2019 | Kairat | 1 – 5 | Tobol | Almaty |
| 19:00 (UTC+6) | Shvyrev (yellow card) 32'; Suyumbayev (yellow card) 45+5'; Sarsenov (yellow card) 64' (goal) 90+1' | Report | Turysbek 13'; Fedin 25'; Dmitrenko (yellow card) 36'; Gordeichuk 44'; Kuat 59' (o.g.); Nurgaliev 86' | Stadium: Central Stadium; Attendance: 2,000; Referee: Artem Kuchin |

== Semifinals ==
The four winners from the quarterfinals were drawn into two two-legged ties.

| 22 May 2019 | Ordabasy | 1 – 1 | Atyrau | Shymkent |
| 18:00 (UTC+6) | Diakate 17' (pen.); Fontanello (yellow card) 28'; Damir Dautov (yellow card) 90+2' | Report | Rafail Ospanov (yellow card) 45+1'; Sergienko 67'; Andrey Shabaev (yellow card) 88'; Vladimir Vomenko (yellow card) 90+3' | Stadium: Kazhymukan Munaitpasov Stadium; Attendance: 3,000; Referee: Bakhyt Kyzylbaev |

| 19 June 2019 | Atyrau | 0 – 0 (a 1 – 1 agg.) | Ordabasy | Atyrau |
| 19:30 (UTC+6) | Dauren Mazhitov (yellow card) 70'; Loginovsky (yellow card) 90+5' | Report | Nepohodov (yellow card) 82' | Stadium: Munaishy Stadium; Attendance: 6,000; Referee: Bagdat Abdullayev |

| 22 May 2019 | Tobol | 1 – 0 | Kaisar | Kostanay |
| 19:00 (UTC+6) | Kankava (yellow card) 3'; Bocharov (yellow card) 29'; Fedin 73'; Kleshchenko (yellow card) 83'; Nurgaliev (yellow card) 90+1' | Report | Graf (yellow card) 17'; Tagybergen (yellow card) 88' | Stadium: Central Stadium; Attendance: 3,000; Referee: Igor Chesnokov |

| 19 June 2019 | Kaisar | 3 – 1 (3 – 2 agg.) | Tobol | Kyzylorda |
| 18:00 (UTC+6) | Barseghyan 15', 90+6' (pen.); Duman Narzildaev (yellow card) 47'; Mbombo 66' | Report | Kassaï (yellow card) 51'; Žulpa 88'; Valiullin (yellow card) 90+3' | Stadium: Gani Muratbayev Stadium; Attendance: 3,000; Referee: Artem Kuchin |

== Final ==
| 6 October 2019 | Atyrau | 1 – 2 (a.e.t.) | Kaisar | Nur-Sultan |
| 15:00 (UTC+6) | Eldar Abdrakhmanov (yellow card) 53'; Grzelczak 67'; Ngwem (yellow card) 68' (yellow-red card) 93'; Nurbolat Kalmenov (yellow card) 70'; Andrey Shabaev (yellow card) 105+1'; Rinat Dzhumatov (yellow card) 105+2'; Ivan Antipov (yellow card) 116'; Kuanysh Kalmuratov (yellow card) 120+5' | Report | John (yellow card) 4'; Tagybergen (red card) 70'; Barseghyan (yellow card) 70'; Marochkin (yellow card) 80'; Zyankovich 88'; Duman Narzildaev 120+3' | Stadium: Astana Arena; Attendance: 4,500; Referee: Timur Kumashev |

== Scorers ==
As of match played 6 October 2019

3 goals:

- (Kazakhstan) Alijar Mohammad, Akademiya Ontustik
- (Kazakhstan) Duman Tursynbay, Altai Semey
- (Kazakhstan) Nurzhan Kuanyshkaliev, SDYuShOR 8
- (Kazakhstan) Bauyrzhan Turysbek, Tobol

2 goals:

- (Kazakhstan) Boris Fomenkov, Akademiya Ontustik
- (Kazakhstan) Abat Aimbetov, Aktobe
- (Kazakhstan) Vladimir Vyatkin, Altai Semey
- (Kazakhstan) Erkasym Yeshenkul, Arys
- (Kazakhstan) Said Muzarapov, Igilik
- (Armenia) Tigran Barseghyan, Kaisar
- (Belarus) Ivan Sadownichy, Kaisar
- (Kazakhstan) Bekzhan Abdrahman, Kyran
- (Kazakhstan) Azamat Khasenov, SDYuShOR 8
- (Kazakhstan) Wildam Nasibullin, SDYuShOR 8
- (Kazakhstan) Victor Pron, SDYuShOR 8
- (Kazakhstan) Daulet Yesbergenov, SDYuShOR 8
- (Kazakhstan) Maxim Fedin, Tobol
- (Kazakhstan) Azat Nurgaliev, Tobol

1 goals:

- (Kazakhstan) Vadim Afanasenko, Akademiya Ontustik
- (Kazakhstan) Yerkebulan Amangeldy, Akademiya Ontustik
- (Kazakhstan) Altynbek Daulethanov, Akademiya Ontustik
- (Kazakhstan) Galymzhan Ermurzaev, Akademiya Ontustik
- (Kazakhstan) Kanat Karimolla, Akademiya Ontustik
- (Kazakhstan) Zhandos Kuandykov, Akademiya Ontustik
- (Kazakhstan) Nursultan Taszhanov, Aksu
- (Kazakhstan) Magyar Ramazanov, Aksu
- (Kazakhstan) Amir Muralinov, Aksu
- (Kazakhstan) Valery Lenkov, Aksu
- (Croatia) Hrvoje Miličević, Aktobe
- (Kazakhstan) Daurenbek Tazhimbetov, Akzhayik
- (Kazakhstan) Anuar Umashev, Altai Semey
- (Kazakhstan) Elyor Samarov, Arys
- (Kazakhstan) Serikzhan Muzhikov, Astana
- (Kazakhstan) Rinat Dzhumatov, Atyrau
- (Kazakhstan) Alexey Rodionov, Atyrau
- (Kazakhstan) Eduard Sergienko, Atyrau
- (Poland) Piotr Grzelczak, Atyrau
- (Kazakhstan) Ilya Vorotnikov, Caspiy
- (Kazakhstan) Aykhan Kozhabekov, Didara Sıdıkbeka
- (Kazakhstan) Sumit Chulagov, Ekibastuz
- (Kazakhstan) Islam Nartbayev, Ekibastuz
- (Kazakhstan) Aslan Yerken, Ekibastuz
- (Kazakhstan) Shyngys Rysbek, Igilik
- (Colombia) Roger Cañas, Irtysh Pavlodar
- (Kazakhstan) Stanislav Lunin, Irtysh Pavlodar
- (Kazakhstan) Magomed Paragulgov, Irtysh Pavlodar
- (Latvia) Kaspars Dubra, Irtysh Pavlodar
- (Kazakhstan) Samat Sarsenov, Kairat
- (Belarus) Ihar Zyankovich, Kaisar
- (Democratic Republic of the Congo) Kule Mbombo, Kaisar
- (Kazakhstan) Askhat Tagybergen, Kaisar
- (Kazakhstan) Duman Narzildaev, Kaisar
- (Serbia) Bratislav Punoševac, Kaisar
- (Kazakhstan) Kirill Pasichnik, Kyran
- (Kazakhstan) Nursayin Zholdasov, Kyran
- (Kazakhstan) Danil Choi, Kyzylzhar
- (Kazakhstan) Viktor Gunchenko, Kyzylzhar
- (Kazakhstan) Vsevolod Koloda, Kyzylzhar
- (Kazakhstan) Pavel Kriventsov, Kyzylzhar
- (Kazakhstan) Elmar Nabiev, Kyzylzhar
- (Montenegro) Uroš Delić, Kyzylzhar
- (Kazakhstan) Adilet Abdenabi, Makhtaaral
- (Kazakhstan) Beknur Ryskul, Makhtaaral
- (Kazakhstan) Temirlan Erlanov, Ordabasy
- (Kazakhstan) Maxim Vaganov, Ordabasy
- (Senegal) Abdoulaye Diakate, Ordabasy
- (Kazakhstan) Arsen Yelemesov, SDYuShOR 8
- (Kazakhstan) Gavril Kan, Taraz
- (Togo) Serge Nyuiadzi, Taraz
- (Belarus) Mikhail Gordeichuk, Tobol
- (Lithuania) Artūras Žulpa, Tobol

Own goal

- (Kazakhstan) Noyan Auganov, Ruzaevka (vs Altai Semey, 19 March 2019)
- (Kazakhstan) Islambek Kuat, Kairat (vs Tobol, 8 May 2019)
