= Mathias Coureur =

Martiniquais international footballer (born 1988)

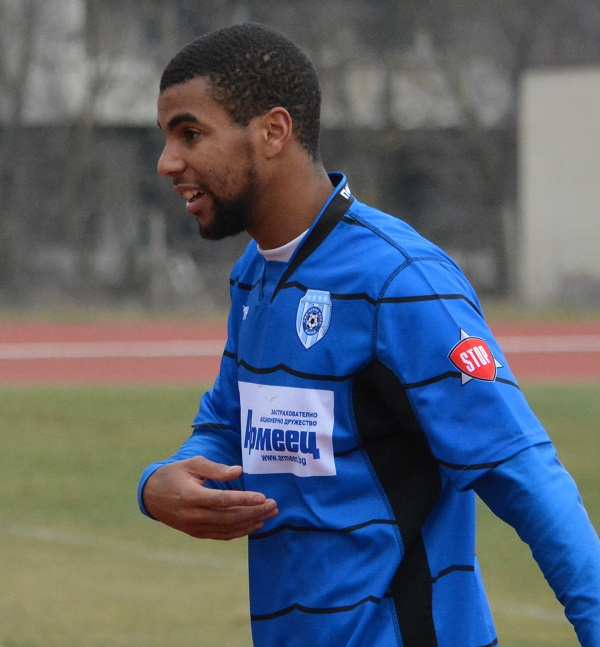
- Coureur with Cherno More in 2015

Personal information
- Date of birth: 22 March 1988 (age 38)
- Place of birth: Fort-de-France, Martinique
- Height: 1.77 m (5 ft 9 1/2 in)
- Positions: Winger; striker

Youth career
- 1993–2000: Sucy-en-Brie
- 2000–2006: Le Havre

Senior career*
Years	Team	Apps	(Gls)
2007–2008	Beauvais	21	(4)
2008–2010	Nantes B	16	(1)
2008–2009	→ Gueugnon (loan)	9	(3)
2010–2011	Orihuela	19	(3)
2011–2012	Atlético Baleares	45	(6)
2013	Golden Lion	18	(8)
2013–2014	Huracán Valencia	20	(1)
2014–2016	Cherno More	55	(16)
2016	Dinamo Tbilisi	2	(0)
2016	Lokomotiv GO	11	(3)
2017–2018	Kaisar	59	(12)
2019	Seongnam	21	(2)
2020	Cherno More	25	(18)
2021	Samsunspor	19	(4)
2021	NorthEast United	10	(1)
2022	Cherno More	30	(6)
2023	Golden Lion	8	(3)
2023	Atlètic d'Escaldes	0	(0)
2023	Stade Poitevin	11	(3)
2024	Chantilly	13	(1)
Total		412	(95)

International career
2013–2016	Martinique	7	(2)
- * Club domestic league appearances and goals

Mathias Coureur (born 22 March 1988) is a former Martiniquais professional footballer who played as a winger or forward.

== Career ==
Born in Martinique, Coureur started his professional career in France, playing for Beauvais, Nantes B and Gueugnon, before moving to Spanish side Orihuela in 2010. He later spent one-and-a-half seasons with fellow Segunda División B club Atlético Baleares. With Baleares, he won the 2011–12 Segunda División B Group III title. In early 2013 Coureur returned to his country to play for Golden Lion.

After successful 5 months in the Martinique Championnat National, Coureur joined Huracán Valencia in July 2013. He made his debut in a 1–1 away draw against Reus Deportiu on 25 August. Coureur scored his first goal for Huracán on 14 September, in a 4–0 home win over Elche Ilicitano.

=== Cherno More Varna ===
On 16 June 2014, Coureur signed with Bulgarian side Cherno More Varna on a two-year deal. He made his debut in a 0–0 home draw against Ludogorets Razgrad on 26 July, coming on as a substitute for Daniel Georgiev. On 31 May 2015, Coureur scored the winning goal in the 119th minute of the 2015 Bulgarian Cup Final against Levski Sofia, giving Cherno More their first ever Bulgarian Cup trophy. With Varna, he also won the 2015 Bulgarian Supercup. He finished the 2014–15 season as the club's top scorer with 9 goals in all competitions.

=== Dinamo Tbilisi ===
On 28 May 2016, after his contract with Cherno More expired, Coureur joined Georgian champions Dinamo Tbilisi. He left the club, however, shortly after that on a mutual agreement, after his team failed to qualify for the group stages of the European competitions. He appeared in 2 matches for Dinamo Tbilisi in the Umaglesi Liga.

=== Lokomotiv GO ===
He returned to Bulgaria, playing for newly promoted A PFG club Lokomotiv GO during the autumn of 2016.

=== Kaisar ===
On 13 January 2017, Coureur signed with Kazakh club Kaisar.

=== Cherno More Varna (second spell) ===
On 15 January 2020, he returned to his former club Cherno More Varna and was greeted positively by the fans of the team. He scored his first hat-trick for the club on 16 August 2020 in a game against Etar Veliko Tarnovo. Coureur topped the goalscoring charts in the league before the winter break, netting 15 times.

=== Samsunspor ===
In January 2021, he signed a contract with Turkish team Samsunspor.

=== NorthEast United ===
On 18 September 2021, he joined Indian Super League side NorthEast United FC on a one-year deal. He made his ISL debut on 20 November against Bengaluru FC in a 4–2 loss, in which he scored a goal. He left the club on 7 January 2022, due to personal issues.

=== Cherno More Varna (third spell) ===
In January 2022 it was confirmed that Coureur will once again become part of the Cherno More team.

== International career ==
In June 2013, Coureur was named in the 23-man Martinique squad for the 2013 CONCACAF Gold Cup. He made his debut in the championship on 7 July in the first group game against Canada, coming on for the last 9 minutes in place of Yoann Arquin. On 12 July, Coureur started in Martinique's second group game, a 1–0 defeat to Panama.

On 3 September 2014, Coureur scored his first international goal in a 6–0 win over Bonaire during the 2014 Caribbean Cup qualifying. In November 2014, he was named in Martinique's squad for the finals of 2014 Caribbean Cup in Jamaica.

== Personal life ==
In January 2022, Coureur tested positive for COVID-19.

== Career statistics ==
=== Club ===
As of match played 4 December 2022

Appearances and goals by club, season and competition
Club	Season	League			National Cup		League Cup		Continental		Other		Total	
Club	Season	Division	Apps	Goals	Apps	Goals	Apps	Goals	Apps	Goals	Apps	Goals	Apps	Goals
Beauvais Oise	2007–08	Championnat National	21	4	2	0	–		–		–		23	4
Nantes B	2007–08	CFA	16	1	0	0	–		–		–		16	1
Gueugnon	2008–09	Championnat National	9	3	1	0	–		–		–		10	3
Orihuela	2010–11	Segunda B	19	3	0	0	–		–		–		19	3
Atlético Baleares	2011–12	Segunda B	35	6	4	0	–		–		–		39	6
Atlético Baleares	2012–13	Segunda B	10	0	1	0	–		–		–		11	0
Atlético Baleares	Total		45	6	5	0	-	-	-	-	-	-	50	6
Golden Lion	2012–13	MCN	18	8	0	0	–		–		–		18	8
Huracán Valencia	2013–14	Segunda B	20	1	1	0	–		–		–		21	1
Cherno More	2014–15	Bulgarian First League	21	5	8	4	–		–		–		29	9
Cherno More	2015–16	Bulgarian First League	34	11	3	0	–		2	1	1	0	40	12
Cherno More	Total		55	16	11	4	-	-	2	1	1	0	69	21
Dinamo Tbilisi	2016	Umaglesi Liga	2	0	0	0	–		4	0	–		6	0
Lokomotiv GO	2016–17	Bulgarian First League	11	3	0	0	–		–		–		11	3
Kaisar	2017	Kazakhstan Premier League	32	5	1	0	–		–		–		33	5
Kaisar	2018	Kazakhstan Premier League	27	7	1	0	–		–		–		28	7
Kaisar	Total		59	12	2	0	-	-	-	-	-	-	61	12
Seongnam	2019	K League 1	21	2	0	0	–		–		–		21	2
Cherno More	2019–20	Bulgarian First League	10	3	0	0	–		–		–		10	3
Cherno More	2020–21	Bulgarian First League	15	15	0	0	–		–		–		15	15
Cherno More	Total		25	18	0	0	-	-	0	0	0	0	25	18
Samsunspor	2020–21	Turkish First League	19	4	0	0	–		–		–		19	4
NorthEast United	2021–22	Indian Super League	10	1	0	0	–		–		–		10	1
Cherno More	2021–22	Bulgarian First League	12	3	0	0	–		–		–		12	3
Cherno More	2022–23	Bulgarian First League	18	3	1	2	–		–		–		19	5
Cherno More	Total		30	6	1	2	-	-	-	-	-	-	31	8
Career total			380	88	23	6	-	-	6	1	1	0	410	95

=== International goals ===
Scores and results list Martinique's goal tally first.

#	Date	Venue	Opponent	Score	Result	Competition
1.	3 September 2014	Stade Pierre-Aliker, Fort-de-France, Martinique	Bonaire	3–0	6–0	2014 Caribbean Cup qualification
2.	8 October 2016	Estadio Panamericano, San Cristóbal, Dominican Republic	Dominican Republic	2–1	2–1	2017 Caribbean Cup qualification

== Honours ==
Atlético Baleares

- Segunda División B (Group III): 2011–12

Cherno More

- Bulgarian Cup: 2014–15
- Bulgarian Supercup: 2015

Golden Lion

- Martinique Championnat National: 2022–23

Individual

- Bulgarian First League Goal of the Week: 2021–22 (Week 23) v. Arda
