= Abdel Lamanje =

French footballer (born 1990)

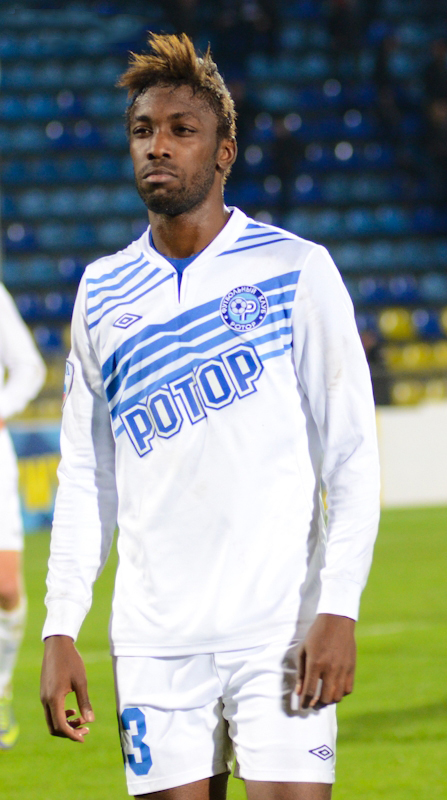

Personal information
- Date of birth: 27 July 1990 (age 36)
- Place of birth: Douala, Cameroon
- Height: 1.81 m (5 ft 11 in)
- Positions: Left back; centre back

Youth career
- Grenoble

Senior career*
Years	Team	Apps	(Gls)
2010–2011	Grenoble	3	(0)
2011–2013	Shinnik Yaroslavl	49	(1)
2013–2014	Rotor Volgograd	33	(0)
2014–2015	Shinnik Yaroslavl	48	(0)
2016	Atyrau	32	(0)
2017–2019	Kaisar	86	(5)
2020	Shakhter Karagandy	17	(2)
2021	Astra Giurgiu	8	(0)
2021–2022	Shakhter Karagandy	10	(0)
- * Club domestic league appearances and goals

Abdel Lamanje (born 27 July 1990) is a French former footballer who played as a left back or centre back.

== Career ==
=== Club ===
Lamanje made his debut in the FNL for FC Shinnik Yaroslavl on 19 August 2011 in a game against FC Baltika Kaliningrad.

On 20 January 2016, Lamanje signed for Kazakhstan Premier League side FC Atyrau on a one-year contract, signing for fellow Kazakhstan Premier League team FC Kaisar on 16 January 2017.

On 24 January 2020, Lamanje signed for Shakhter Karagandy.

On 15 July 2021, Lamanje returned to Shakhter Karagandy.

== Career statistics ==
As of match played 14 May 2022

Appearances and goals by club, season and competition
Club	Season	League			National Cup		League Cup		Continental		Other		Total	
Club	Season	Division	Apps	Goals	Apps	Goals	Apps	Goals	Apps	Goals	Apps	Goals	Apps	Goals
Grenoble Foot 38	2010–11	Ligue 2	3	0	0	0	1	0	–		–		4	0
Shinnik Yaroslavl	2011–12	FNL	21	1	0	0	–		–		1	0	22	1
Shinnik Yaroslavl	2012–13	FNL	28	0	1	0	–		–		–		29	0
Shinnik Yaroslavl	Total		49	1	1	0	-	-	-	-	1	0	51	1
Rotor Volgograd	2013–14	FNL	33	0	3	0	–		–		–		36	0
Shinnik Yaroslavl	2014–15	FNL	26	0	2	0	–		–		–		28	0
Shinnik Yaroslavl	2015–16	FNL	22	0	0	0	–		–		–		22	0
Shinnik Yaroslavl	Total		48	0	2	0	-	-	-	-	-	-	50	0
Atyrau	2016	Kazakhstan Premier League	32	0	2	0	–		–		–		34	0
Kaisar	2017	Kazakhstan Premier League	30	1	0	0	–		–		–		30	1
Kaisar	2018	Kazakhstan Premier League	27	2	1	0	–		–		–		28	2
Kaisar	2019	Kazakhstan Premier League	29	2	2	0	–		–		–		31	2
Kaisar	Total		86	5	3	0	-	-	-	-	-	-	89	6
Shakhter Karagandy	2020	Kazakhstan Premier League	17	2	0	0	–		–		–		17	2
Astra Giurgiu	2020–21	Liga I	8	0	0	0	–		–		–		8	0
Shakhter Karagandy	2021	Kazakhstan Premier League	6	0	6	0	–		4	0	0	0	16	0
Shakhter Karagandy	2022	Kazakhstan Premier League	4	0	0	0	–		–		–		4	0
Shakhter Karagandy	Total		10	0	6	0	-	-	4	0	0	0	20	0
Career total			283	9	17	0	1	0	4	0	1	0	306	9
