= Tigran Barseghyan =

Armenian footballer (born 1993)

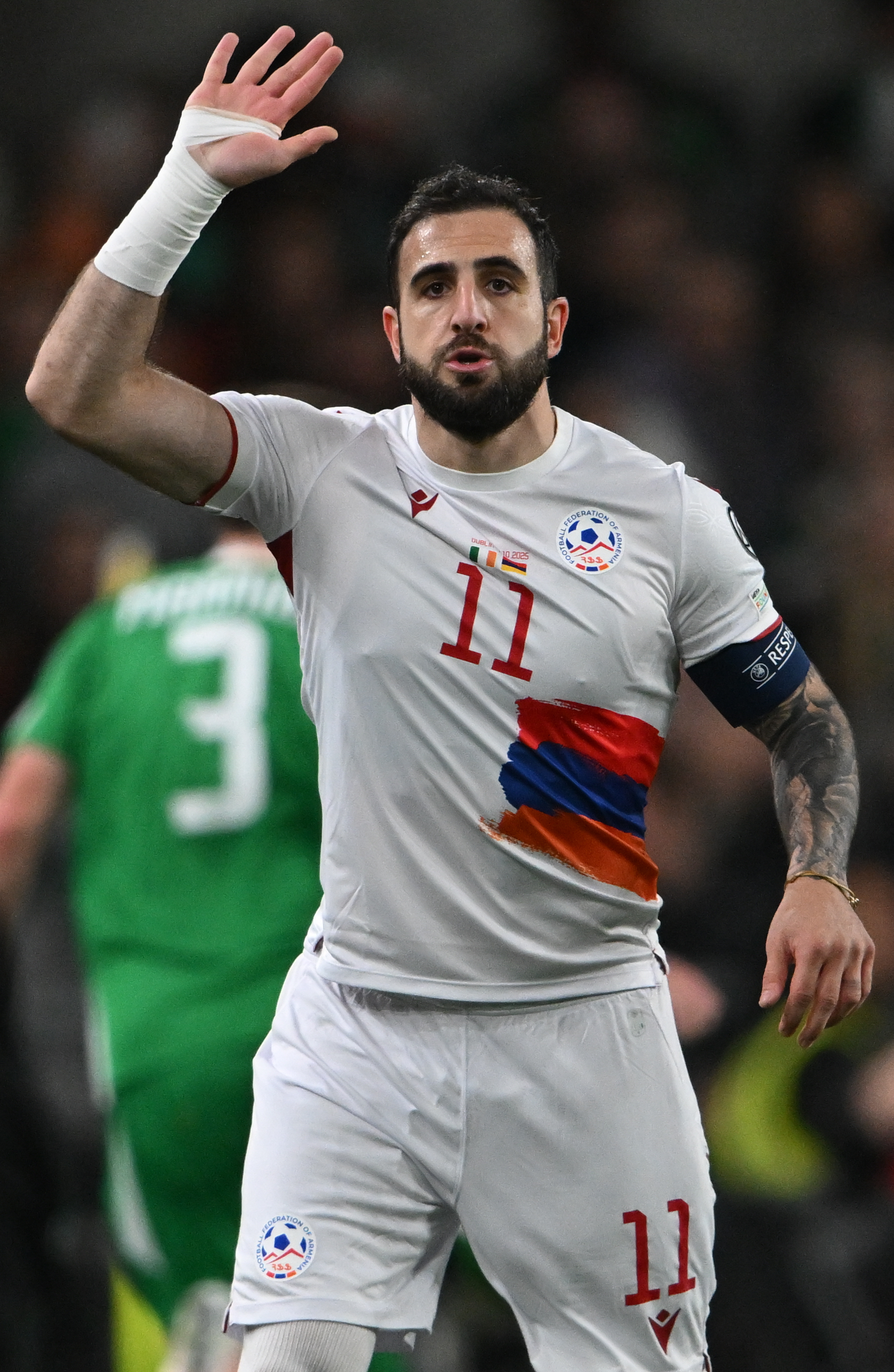
- Barseghyan playing for Armenia in 2025

Personal information
- Full name: Tigran Ashotovich Barseghyan
- Date of birth: 22 September 1993 (age 33)
- Place of birth: Yerevan, Armenia
- Height: 1.79 m (5 ft 10 in)
- Positions: Winger; forward

Team information
- Current team: Slovan Bratislava
- Number: 11

Senior career*
Years	Team	Apps	(Gls)
2009–2011	Banants	2	(0)
2009–2011	→ Banants-2	59	(20)
2011–2013	Gandzasar Kapan	6	(0)
2011–2013	→ Gandzasar-2	55	(16)
2014–2015	Mika	38	(9)
2015–2016	Gandzasar Kapan	21	(4)
2016–2018	Vardar	54	(20)
2019–2020	Kaisar	29	(12)
2020–2021	Astana	43	(10)
2022–	Slovan Bratislava	132	(56)

International career^{‡}
2014	Armenia U21	4	(0)
2016–2025	Armenia	64	(9)
- * Club domestic league appearances and goals as of 31 October 2026 ‡ National team caps and goals as of 14 October 2025 (UTC)

Tigran Barseghyan (Armenian: Տիգրան Բարսեղյան; born 22 September 1993) is an Armenian professional footballer who plays as a winger for Slovak First Football League side Slovan Bratislava and former player of the Armenia national team.

== Club career ==
Born in Armenian capital Yerevan, Barseghyan played with FC Banants, FC Gandzasar Kapan and FC Mika in the Armenian Premier League. On 30 August 2016, he moved abroad and signed with Macedonian side FK Vardar where his national teammate Hovhannes Hambardzumyan is already playing.

After two-and-a-half seasons at FK Vardar, considered to be one of the best foreign players to play in Macedonian First Football League by media such as gol.mk due to visa problems, he left the club, seeking a new one at the beginning of 2019.

On 24 January 2020, FC Astana announced the signing of Barseghyan to a two-year contract.

On 24 November 2021, Slovan Bratislava announced the signing of Barseghyan to a contract. On 28 August 2024, he scored the winning goal in a 3–2 victory over Midtjylland during the 2024–25 Champions League play-off second leg, qualifying his club to the group stage for the first time in their history with a 4–3 aggregate score.

== International career ==
Barseghyan played with the Armenia U21 national team in 2014. In 2016, he made his debut for the senior national team. He participated in the 2018–19 UEFA Nations League. He scored a goal to tie a Nations League match against Liechtenstein, with his team ultimately winning. He scored the winning goal on a penalty against Romania.

On 14 October 2025 Barseghyan was given a red card for head-butting Irish player Finn Azaz in a FIFA World Cup Qualifier.

On 18 February 2026, Barseghyan officially retired from the Armenian national team.

== Career statistics ==
=== Club ===
As of match played 3 November 2026

Appearances and goals by club, season and competition
Club	Season	League			National cup (Note: Includes Armenian Cup, Macedonian Football Cup, Kazakhstan Cup, Slovak Cup)		Continental		Other		Total	
Club	Season	Division	Apps	Goals	Apps	Goals	Apps	Goals	Apps	Goals	Apps	Goals
Mika	2013–14	Armenian Premier League	14	4	2	0	–		–		16	4
Mika	2014–15	Armenian Premier League	24	5	5	1	2 (Note: Appearances in UEFA Europa League)	0	–		31	6
Mika	Total		38	9	7	1	2	0	0	0	47	10
Gandzasar Kapan	2015–16	Armenian Premier League	21	4	4	0	–		–		25	4
Vardar	2016–17	Macedonian First League	16	7	2	0	0 (Note: Appearances in UEFA Champions League)	0	–		18	7
Vardar	2017–18	Macedonian First League	31	9	2	0	12 (Note: Four appearances and one goal in UEFA Champions League, eight appearances and one goal in UEFA Europa League)	2	–		45	11
Vardar	2018–19	Macedonian First League	7	4	0	0	2	0	–		9	4
Vardar	Total		54	20	4	0	14	2	0	0	72	22
Kaisar	2019	Kazakhstan Premier League	29	12	3	0	–		–		29	12
Astana	2020	Kazakhstan Premier League	19	3	0	0	2 (Note: One appearance in UEFA Champions League, one appearance in UEFA Europa League)	0	1 (Note: Appearance(s) in Kazakhstan Super Cup)	0	22	3
Astana	2021	Kazakhstan Premier League	24	7	5	2	4 (Note: Appearances in UEFA Europa Conference League)	2	2	1	31	10
Astana	Total		43	10	5	2	6	2	3	1	57	15
Slovan Bratislava	2021–22	Slovak First Football League	10	4	4	0	—		—		14	4
Slovan Bratislava	2022–23	Slovak First Football League	26	5	4	1	13 (Note: Four appearances and two goals in UEFA Champions League, two appearances in UEFA Europa League, seven appearances in UEFA Conference League)	2	—		43	8
Slovan Bratislava	2023–24	Slovak First Football League	30	13	2	1	16 (Note: Six appearances in UEFA Champions League, two appearances and one goal in UEFA Europa League, eight appearances in UEFA Conference League)	1	1 (Note: Appearance in play-off)	0	49	15
Slovan Bratislava	2024–25	Slovak First Football League	30	20	4	1	14	3	—		46	24
Slovan Bratislava	2025–26	Slovak First Football League	25	10	1	0	11 (Note: Four appearances and one goal in UEFA Champions League, two appearances in UEFA Europa League, five appearances in UEFA Conference League)	1	0	0	37	11
Slovan Bratislava	2026–27	Slovak First Football League	11	4	1	1	7	0	—		19	5
Slovan Bratislava	Total		132	56	16	4	61	7	1	0	210	67
Career total			317	111	39	7	83	11	4	1	443	130

=== International ===
As of matches played 14 October 2025

Appearances and goals by national team and year
National team	Year	Apps	Goals
Armenia	2016	3	1
Armenia	2017	8	0
Armenia	2018	8	1
Armenia	2019	9	3
Armenia	2020	6	1
Armenia	2021	10	2
Armenia	2022	8	0
Armenia	2023	6	1
Armenia	2025	6	0
Total		64	9

Scores and results list Armenia's goal tally first, score column indicates score after each Barseghyan goal.

List of international goals scored by Tigran Barseghyan
No.	Date	Venue	Opponent	Score	Result	Competition
1	1 June 2016	StubHub Center, Carson, United States	El Salvador	3–0	4–0	Friendly
2	6 September 2018	Vazgen Sargsyan Republican Stadium, Yerevan, Armenia	Liechtenstein	2–1	2–1	2018–19 UEFA Nations League D
3	8 June 2019	Vazgen Sargsyan Republican Stadium, Yerevan, Armenia	Liechtenstein	3–0	3–0	UEFA Euro 2020 qualification
4	11 June 2019	Olympic Stadium, Athens, Greece	Greece	3–1	3–2	UEFA Euro 2020 qualification
5	12 October 2019	Rheinpark Stadion, Vaduz, Liechtenstein	Liechtenstein	1–0	1–1	UEFA Euro 2020 qualification
6	5 September 2020	Toše Proeski Arena, Skopje, North Macedonia	North Macedonia	1–2	1–2	2020–21 UEFA Nations League C
7	28 March 2021	Vazgen Sargsyan Republican Stadium, Yerevan, Armenia	Iceland	1–0	2–0	2022 FIFA World Cup qualification
8	31 March 2021	Vazgen Sargsyan Republican Stadium, Yerevan, Armenia	Romania	3–2	3–2	2022 FIFA World Cup qualification
9	19 June 2023	Vazgen Sargsyan Republican Stadium, Yerevan, Armenia	Latvia	2–1	2–1	UEFA Euro 2024 qualification

== Honours ==
Vardar

- Macedonian First League: 2016–17

Kaisar

- Kazakhstan Cup: 2019

Astana

- Kazakhstan Super Cup: 2020

Slovan Bratislava

- Slovak First Football League: 2021–22, 2022–23, 2023–24, 2024–25, 2025–26

Individual

- Slovak First Football League Top scorer: 2023–24
- Slovak First Football League Goal of the Month: September 2023
