= Yoann Arquin =

French footballer (born 1988)

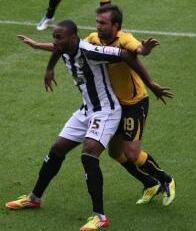
- Arquin (left) playing for Notts County in 2012

Personal information
- Full name: Yoann Axel Cyriac Arquin
- Date of birth: 15 April 1988 (age 38)
- Place of birth: Le Havre, Seine-Maritime, France
- Height: 1.89 m (6 ft 2 in)
- Position: Forward

Team information
- Current team: Enna

Senior career*
Years	Team	Apps	(Gls)
2005–2007	Nancy B	10	(0)
2007–2008	Nantes B	17	(1)
2008–2009	Quimper	31	(10)
2009–2010	Paris Saint Germain B	28	(8)
2010–2011	Red Star 93	11	(2)
2011–2012	Hereford United	34	(8)
2012–2014	Notts County	53	(10)
2014–2015	Ross County	33	(6)
2015	St Mirren	12	(0)
2015–2016	1461 Trabzon	22	(3)
2016	Syrianska	13	(5)
2017	Mansfield Town	12	(2)
2018	Kaisar	7	(0)
2018–2019	Yeovil Town	32	(4)
2019–2021	Heilongjiang Lava Spring	15	(7)
2021	Wuhan FC	5	(0)
2022	Acireale	7	(1)
2022–2023	Siracusa	20	(5)
2023–	Enna	0	(0)

International career
2013–2017	Martinique	17	(4)
- * Club domestic league appearances and goals as of 22:00, 25 August 2023 (UTC)

Yoann Axel Cyriac Arquin (born 15 April 1988) is a professional footballer who plays as a centre forward for Serie D club Enna. Born in metropolitan France, he represented the Martinique national team.

== Club career ==
=== France ===
Arquin started his career with Nancy B.

=== Hereford United ===
Former Hereford United striker Guy Ipoua, recommended Arquin to the club in the summer of 2011 and after enjoying a successful trial, Arquin joined Hereford United on a free transfer on 25 July 2011.

Arquin scored his first goal for Hereford on 9 August, in a first round League Cup victory against Brentford. Over the rest of the season he scored 7 more times, including winners against Dagenham & Redbridge and 2 goals in the 3–0 victory over Crawley Town. However his efforts were not enough to prevent Hereford's relegation on the final day of the season to the Football Conference.

People have compared Arquin to former Hereford striker Mathieu Manset, who left the club in January 2011, to join Reading.

=== Notts County ===
After leaving Hereford in the summer, Arquin became Notts County's 8th signing in preparation for the 2012–13 season on 11 July 2012. He signed a one-year contract, with the option of an extra 12 months. He scored his first goal in the 2–2 friendly against rivals Nottingham Forest on 7 August 2012. He made his competitive debut for Notts County in the Capital One League Cup game against Bradford City. In his league debut Arquin scored to make it 2–0 against Crewe but minutes later got sent off for kicking out at Ashley Westwood. Arquin made his return to league action against Shrewsbury Town where his superb run set up Lee Hughes to score the winning goal. He then scored a brace in a 3–0 win over Portsmouth. Arquin scored his fourth goal for the club against Coventry with a fine curling effort to put his team 2–0 up. After going over 5 games without a goal, Arquin finally scored his ninth goal for the club in a 3–1 win over Colchester after he headed in from a corner. He finished the 2012–13 season as Notts County's top goalscorer picking up the Golden Boot award at the end of season ceremony. Arquin also picked up the goal of the season award for his stunning volley against Rotherham United.

Arquin scored his first goal of the 2013–14 season in a 4–2 defeat to Peterborough United. In the next game against Walsall, he came off the bench and headed in Alan Sheehan's cross to equalise the scores. The match finished 1–1 and secured Notts County's first point of the season. On 27 August 2013, he scored a header against Liverpool in a 4–2 defeat at Anfield in the League Cup.

=== Ross County ===
On 15 January 2014, Arquin joined Scottish club Ross County on a 1-year contract. He scored a goal on his debut in a home match against Dundee United on 18 January 2014, in what was a 3–0 win for the hosts.

Arquin left Ross County when his contract expired on 2 January 2015.

=== St Mirren ===
On 14 January 2015, Arquin signed for St Mirren until the end of season 2014–15. Arquin received a straight red card after 37 minutes of his debut, a 2–1 away victory against his previous club Ross County, on 17 January 2015 – however on appeal this was later reduced to a yellow card. Arquin left Saints on 29 May 2015 after an unsuccessful spell with the club, making 12 appearances and scoring no goals.

=== 1461 Trabzon ===
On 22 July 2015, Arquin signed a two-year contract for Turkish club 1461 Trabzon who play in the TFF First League.

=== Syrianska FC ===
On 27 July 2016, Arquin signed a rest-of the-season contract for Swedish club Syrianska FC who play in Superettan.

=== Mansfield Town ===
Arquin returned to English football in December 2016, joining Mansfield Town. He was released by Mansfield at the end of the 2016–17 season.

=== Kaisar ===
In January 2018, Arquin went on trial with Kazakhstan Premier League club FC Kaisar, signing a one-year contract with them on 28 January 2018.

=== Yeovil Town ===
On 2 August 2018, Arquin signed for League Two side Yeovil Town on a six-month contract following a successful trial. At the end of the 2018–19 season, Arquin was released by Yeovil following the club's relegation from the Football League.

== Style of play ==
Arquin is a strong player known to be good in the air and comfortable using both feet. Notts County defender Dean Leacock likened Arquin to Nicolas Anelka. "A lot of us call him Anelka because he's got so much skill – and he's quite stroppy too!".

== Career statistics ==
=== Club ===
As of match played on 28 July 2021

Appearances and goals by club, season and competition
Club	Season	League			National Cup		League Cup		Other		Total	
Club	Season	Division	Apps	Goals	Apps	Goals	Apps	Goals	Apps	Goals	Apps	Goals
Hereford United	2011–12	League Two	34	8	1	0	2	1	1 (Note: Appearance(s) in Football League Trophy/EFL Trophy)	0	38	9
Notts County	2012–13	League One	41	7	3	2	1	0	2	0	47	9
Notts County	2013–14	League One	12	3	1	0	2	1	3	0	18	4
Notts County	Total		53	10	4	2	3	1	5	0	65	13
Ross County	2013–14	Scottish Premiership	16	4	—		—		—		16	4
Ross County	2014–15	Scottish Premiership	17	2	1	0	1	0	—		19	2
Ross County	Total		33	6	1	0	1	0	—		35	6
St Mirren	2014–15	Scottish Premiership	12	0	—		—		—		12	0
1461 Trabzon	2015–16	TFF First League	22	3	4	2	—		—		26	5
Syrianska FC	2016	Superettan	13	5	0	0	—		2 (Note: Appearances in Superettan Playoffs)	1	15	6
Mansfield Town	2016–17	League Two	12	2	0	0	0	0	2	0	14	2
FC Kaisar	2018	Kazakh Premier League	7	0	1	0	—		—		8	0
Yeovil Town	2018–19	League Two	32	4	0	0	1	0	3	0	36	4
Heilongjiang Lava Spring	2019	China League One	11	7	0	0	—		—		11	7
Heilongjiang Lava Spring	2020	China League One	4	0	—		—		2 (Note: Appearances in League One relegation play-offs)	0	6	0
Heilongjiang Lava Spring	Total		15	7	0	0	—		2	0	17	7
Wuhan FC	2021	Chinese Super League	5	0	0	0	—		—		5	0
Career total			238	45	11	2	7	1	15	1	271	52

=== International ===
As of match played 15 July 2017.

Appearances and goals by national team and year
National team	Year	Apps	Goals
Martinique	2013	2	0
Martinique	2014	6	1
Martinique	2016	5	2
Martinique	2017	4	1
Total		17	4

As of match played 15 July 2017. Martinique score listed first, score column indicates score after each Arquin goal.

International goals by date, venue, cap, opponent, score, result and competition
No.	Date	Venue	Cap	Opponent	Score	Result	Competition
1	12 November 2014	Montego Bay Sports Complex, Montego Bay, Jamaica	6	Jamaica	1–1	1–1	2014 Caribbean Cup
2	23 March 2016	Stade Pierre-Aliker, Fort-de-France, Martinique	9	British Virgin Islands	2–0	3–0	2017 Caribbean Cup qualification
3	29 March 2016	Windsor Park, Roseau, Dominica	10	Dominica	3–1	4–1	2017 Caribbean Cup qualification
4	22 June 2017	Stade Pierre-Aliker, Fort-de-France, Martinique	14	Curaçao	1–0	1–2	2017 Caribbean Cup
