= Kule Mbombo =

Congolese footballer

Personal information
- Full name: Richard Kule Mbombo
- Date of birth: 10 May 1996 (age 30)
- Place of birth: Kinshasa, Zaire
- Position: Forward

Team information
- Current team: Hapoel Afula

Youth career
- 2014–2015: RCK
- 2015–2017: Vita Club
- 2016–2017: → Anderlecht (loan)

Senior career*
| Years | Team | Apps | (Gls) |
| 2016–2019 | Vita Club | 3 | (2) |
| 2017–2018 | → Beerschot Wilrijk (loan) | 18 | (3) |
| 2018 | → AS Trenčín (loan) | 1 | (0) |
| 2019 | Kaisar | 31 | (10) |
| 2020–2021 | Riga | 28 | (13) |
| 2021 | → FK Sūduva (loan) | 17 | (8) |
| 2021 | Dibba Al-Hisn | 0 | (0) |
| 2022 | Sūduva | 25 | (11) |
| 2023 | NorthEast United | 6 | (0) |
| 2023 | FC Telavi | 7 | (0) |
| 2023–2024 | Hapoel Ramat HaSharon | 32 | (11) |
| 2024 | Hapoel Afula | 17 | (6) |
| 2025 | Hapoel Acre | 20 | (9) |
| 2025– | Hapoel Afula | 25 | (3) |
- * Club domestic league appearances and goals as of 24 June 2026

Richard Kule Mbombo (born 10 May 1996) is a Congolese footballer currently playing as a forward for Liga Leumit club Hapoel Acre.

== Career ==
On 21 January 2020, Mbombo signed for Riga FC.

=== FK Sūduva ===
In 2021 Riga FC loaned player to Lithuanian FK Sūduva

On 19 March 2021, Kule Mbombo scored his first goal in A lyga.

In the end of June 2021 player return to Latvia. In 2021 A lyga season he played 17 matches and scored 8 goals. Also he scored one goal in LFF Cup tournament.

=== NorthEast United ===
In January 2023, Mbombo joined Indian Super League club NorthEast United.

== Career statistics ==
As of match played 1 June 2024

Appearances and goals by club, season and competition
| Club | Season | League | | | Cup | | Continental | | Other | | Total | |
| Club | Season | Division | Apps | Goals | Apps | Goals | Apps | Goals | Apps | Goals | Apps | Goals |
|---|---|---|---|---|---|---|---|---|---|---|---|---|
| Vita Club | 2016–17 | Linafoot | ? | ? | ? | ? | 2 (Note: Appearances and goals in the CAF Champions League) | 2 | ? | ? | 2 | 2 |
| Beerschot Wilrijk (loan) | 2017–18 | Belgian First Division B | 7 | 2 | 0 | 0 | – | | 9 (Note: Appearances and goals in the UEFA Europa League Play-offs) | 1 | 16 | 3 |
| Beerschot Wilrijk (loan) | 2018–19 | Belgian First Division B | 1 | 0 | 0 | 0 | — | | 0 | 0 | 1 | 0 |
| Beerschot Wilrijk (loan) | Total | | 8 | 2 | 0 | 0 | 0 | 0 | 9 | 1 | 17 | 3 |
| AS Trenčín (loan) | 2018–19 | Fortuna Liga | 1 | 0 | 0 | 0 | 0 | 0 | 0 | 0 | 1 | 0 |
| Kaisar | 2019 | Kazakhstan Premier League | 26 | 9 | 4 | 0 | — | | — | | 30 | 9 |
| Riga | 2020 | Virslīga | 21 | 12 | 1 | 0 | 2 (Note: 1 appearance in the UEFA Champions League qualifying stage, and 1 appearance in the UEFA Europa League qualifying stage.) | 0 | — | | 24 | 12 |
| NorthEast United | 2022–23 | Indian Super League | 6 | 0 | 0 | 0 | 0 | 0 | — | | 6 | 0 |
| Telavi | 2023 | Erovnuli Liga | 7 | 0 | 0 | 0 | 0 | 0 | — | | 7 | 0 |
| Hapoel Ramat HaSharon | 2023–24 | Liga Leumit | 32 | 11 | 3 | 3 | 0 | 0 | — | | 35 | 14 |
| Hapoel Afula | 2024–25 | Liga Leumit | 0 | 0 | 0 | 0 | 0 | 0 | — | | 0 | 0 |
| Career total | | | 101 | 34 | 8 | 3 | 2 | 0 | 9 | 1 | 120 | 38 |

== Honours ==
=== Club ===
FK Sūduva Marijampolė

- Alyga

Kaisar

- Kazakhstan Cup (1): 2019
