= Askhat Tagybergen =

Kazakh footballer (born 1990)

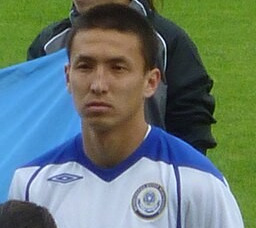
- Tagybergen in 2011

Personal information
- Full name: Askhat Tagybergenuly Tagybergen
- Date of birth: 9 August 1990 (age 36)
- Place of birth: Kyzylorda, Kazakh SSR, Soviet Union
- Height: 1.80 m (5 ft 11 in)
- Position: Midfielder

Team information
- Current team: Tobol
- Number: 8

Senior career*
Years	Team	Apps	(Gls)
2008–2012	Kaisar	79	(4)
2012–2016	Aktobe	74	(2)
2016–2018	Astana	34	(4)
2017	→ Tobol (loan)	10	(0)
2018–2021	Kaisar	69	(13)
2021–2023	Tobol	47	(12)
2023–2025	Ordabasy	50	(13)
2025–	Tobol	50	(5)

International career^{‡}
2013	Kazakhstan U21	7	(0)
2014–	Kazakhstan	65	(4)
- * Club domestic league appearances and goals as of 1 November 2026 ‡ National team caps and goals as of 9 June 2025

Askhat Tagybergenuly Tagybergen (Kazakh: Асхат Тағыбергенұлы Тағыберген; born 9 August 1990) is a Kazakh professional footballer who plays as a midfielder for Kazakhstan Premier League club Tobol and the Kazakhstan national team.

== Club career ==
Tagybergen signed for Astana in February 2016.

On 15 June 2017, Tagybergen returned to Astana after a loan with Tobol, where he made desultory appearances.

On 9 January 2018, FC Kaisar announced the signing of Tagybergen.

== International career ==
Tagybergen was included in the Kazakhstan national team.

Tagybergen's long-range equaliser against Denmark on 26 March 2023 was voted Goal of the Round for Matchday 2 of UEFA Euro 2024 qualifying and was nominated for the 2023 FIFA Puskás Award.

== Career statistics ==
=== Club ===
As of match played 27 November 2020

Appearances and goals by club, season and competition
Club	Season	League			National cup		Continental		Other		Total	
Club	Season	Division	Apps	Goals	Apps	Goals	Apps	Goals	Apps	Goals	Apps	Goals
Aktobe	2013	Kazakhstan Premier League	22	0	4	0	6	1	–		32	1
Aktobe	2014	Kazakhstan Premier League	26	1	4	0	3	0	1	0	34	1
Aktobe	2015	Kazakhstan Premier League	26	1	4	0	0	0	–		30	1
Aktobe	Total		74	2	12	0	9	1	1	0	96	3
Astana	2016	Kazakhstan Premier League	26	2	3	2	6	0	0	0	35	4
Astana	2017	Kazakhstan Premier League	8	2	0	0	4	0	0	0	12	2
Astana	Total		34	4	3	2	10	0	0	0	47	6
Tobol (loan)	2017	Kazakhstan Premier League	10	0	0	0	–		–		10	0
Kaisar	2018	Kazakhstan Premier League	24	5	1	0	–		–		25	5
Kaisar	2019	Kazakhstan Premier League	30	4	3	1	–		–		33	5
Kaisar	2020	Kazakhstan Premier League	14	4	0	0	1	0	1	0	16	4
Kaisar	Total		68	13	4	1	1	0	1	0	74	14
Career total			186	19	19	3	20	1	2	0	227	23

=== International ===
As of match played 23 March 2025

Appearances and goals by national team and year
National team	Year	Apps	Goals
Kazakhstan	2014	3	0
Kazakhstan	2015	2	0
Kazakhstan	2016	7	0
Kazakhstan	2017	6	0
Kazakhstan	2018	0	0
Kazakhstan	2019	5	0
Kazakhstan	2020	4	0
Kazakhstan	2021	8	0
Kazakhstan	2022	7	0
Kazakhstan	2023	8	2
Kazakhstan	2024	10	0
Kazakhstan	2025	2	2
Total		62	4

As of match played 23 March 2025

Scores and results list Kazakhstan's goal tally first, score column indicates score after each Tagybergen goal.

List of international goals scored by Askhat Tagybergen
No.	Date	Venue	Opponent	Score	Result	Competition	Ref.
1	26 March 2023	Astana Arena, Astana, Kazakhstan	Denmark	2–2	3–2	UEFA Euro 2024 qualification	
2	16 June 2023	Stadio Ennio Tardini, Parma, Italy	San Marino	2–0	3–0	UEFA Euro 2024 qualification	
3	19 March 2025	Gloria Sports Arena, Antalya, Turkey	Curaçao	2–0	2–0	Exhibition game	
4	22 March 2025	Cardiff City Stadium, Cardiff, Wales	Wales	1–1	1–3	2026 FIFA World Cup qualification	
