= Carlitos (footballer, born 1993) =

Portuguese footballer

Personal information
- Full name: Carlos Miguel Tavares de Oliveira
- Date of birth: 9 March 1993 (age 33)
- Place of birth: Almada, Portugal
- Height: 1.74 m (5 ft 8 1/2 in)
- Position: Winger

Youth career
- 2002–2003: AFD Torre
- 2003–2007: Benfica
- 2007–2012: Estoril

Senior career*
Years	Team	Apps	(Gls)
2012–2013	Sintrense	30	(7)
2013–2016	Doxa	62	(10)
2014–2015	→ AEL Limassol (loan)	19	(0)
2016	APOEL	0	(0)
2016–2018	Anorthosis	57	(2)
2018–2019	Wisła Płock	8	(1)
2019	Kaisar	5	(0)
2019–2021	Doxa	41	(5)
2021–2022	Pyunik	11	(0)
2022–2023	Chania	5	(0)
2023	Aiolikos	7	(2)
2024–2025	Gondomar	14	(1)
2025–2026	Espinho	20	(6)
- * Club domestic league appearances and goals as of 21:21, 7 October 2026 (UTC)

Carlos Miguel Tavares de Oliveira (born 9 March 1993), known as Carlitos, is a Portuguese professional footballer who plays as a right winger.

== Club career ==
=== Doxa ===
Born in Almada, Setúbal District, Carlitos started his senior career in 2012 with amateurs S.U. Sintrense. In the following year, aged 20, he signed for Doxa Katokopias FC of the Cypriot First Division.

Carlitos made his debut as a professional on 1 September 2013, coming in as a second-half substitute in a 2–0 home win against Nea Salamis Famagusta FC. On 26 January of the following year he scored his first goal for the club, in a 2–1 loss at Apollon Limassol FC.

In summer 2014, Carlitos joined fellow Cypriot top-flight team AEL Limassol on a season-long loan deal. He subsequently returned to Doxa.

=== APOEL and Anorthosis ===
On 9 June 2016, Carlitos moved to reigning Cypriot champions APOEL FC on a three-year contract, but two months later he was sold to Anorthosis Famagusta FC for a reported fee of €100,000.

=== Later career ===
In the following years, Carlitos represented Wisła Płock (Polish Ekstraklasa), FC Kaisar (Kazakhstan Premier League), Doxa Katokopias FC (Cypriot top tier), FC Pyunik (Armenian Premier League) and PAE Chania (Super League Greece 2).

== Personal life ==
Chiquinho's younger brother, Francisco, was also a footballer and a winger.

== Honours ==
Kaisar

- Kazakhstan Cup: 2019

Pyunik

- Armenian Premier League: 2021–22
