= Aleksandr Grigorenko =

Kazakhstani footballer

Personal information
- Date of birth: 6 February 1985 (age 41)
- Place of birth: Bila Tserkva, Ukrainian SSR
- Height: 1.82 m (6 ft 0 in)
- Position: Goalkeeper

Youth career
- 1998–2002: FC Dynamo Kyiv

Senior career*
Years	Team	Apps	(Gls)
2002–2004	Ros Bila Tserkva	24	(0)
2004–2006	Atyrau	50	(0)
2007–2012	Shakhter Karagandy	70	(0)
2013–2014	Ordabasy	51	(0)
2015–2017	Taraz	52	(0)
2017–2019	Kaisar	55	(0)

International career
2004–2005	Kazakhstan U-21	11	(0)
- * Club domestic league appearances and goals

Aleksandr Grigorenko (Ukrainian: Олександр Сергійович Григоренко, Oleksandr Serhiyovych Hryhorenko; born 6 February 1985) is a Kazakhstani former professional footballer from Ukraine.

== Career ==
Grigorenko made his professional debut in the Ukrainian Second League for FC Ros Bila Tserkva in 2002. In 2004 Grigorenko decided to move to Kazakhstan, with FC Atyrau before signing for FC Shakhter Karagandy.

In December 2014, Grigorenko left FC Ordabasy.

Grigorenko was once a main goalkeeper for the Kazakhstan U-21 team and the Kazakhstan champion FC Shakhter.

== Honours ==
- Kazakhstan Premier League bronze: 2007.
