= John Kamara =

Sierra Leonean footballer

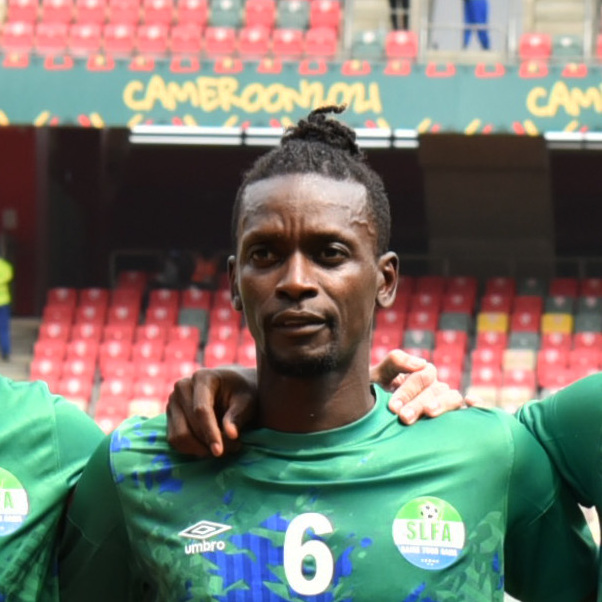
- Kamara with Sierra Leone in 2022

Personal information
- Full name: John Bankolé Kamara
- Date of birth: 5 December 1988 (age 37)
- Place of birth: Freetown, Sierra Leone
- Height: 1.86 m (6 ft 1 in)
- Position: Midfielder

Team information
- Current team: Maharlika Manila

Senior career*
Years	Team	Apps	(Gls)
2008–2012	Tadamon Sour	20	(0)
2012–2014	Apollon Smyrnis	47	(0)
2014–2015	Lamia	17	(0)
2015–2016	Aris	0	(0)
2016	Riga	26	(0)
2017–2018	Kaisar	53	(1)
2019–2021	Keşla	53	(1)
2022	Politehnica Iași	6	(1)
2023–2024	Egaleo	22	(1)
2024	United City		
2024–	Maharlika Manila		

International career^{‡}
2013–	Sierra Leone	21	(1)
- * Club domestic league appearances and goals as of 12:50, 26 January 2025 (UTC) ‡ National team caps and goals as of 13:21, 4 January 2022 (UTC)

John Bankolé Kamara (born 5 December 1988) is a Sierra Leonean professional footballer who plays as a midfielder for Maharlika Manila.

== Club career ==
Born in Freetown, Kamara has played in Lebanon and Greece for Tadamon Sour, Apollon Smyrnis and Lamia. In October 2014 he was told not to train with Lamia, on advice from the Greek health ministry, following fears over the ongoing Ebola virus epidemic. In response he wore a T-shirt saying "we are west Africans not a virus", and as a result faced sanctions.

In August 2015 he signed a two-year contract with Aris. He signed for Latvian club Riga for the 2016 season.

Kamara joined Kazakh club Kaisar on 1 January 2017.

On 8 January 2019, Kamara joined Azerbaijan Premier League club Keşla FK. On 25 June 2020, Kamara signed a new contract with Keşla for the 2020–21 season.

On 27 December 2021, Kamara left Keşla by mutual consent.

In January 2023, he signed for Greek team Egaleo.

In March 2024, Kamara joined Philippines Football League club United City. He then moved to Maharlika Manila later that year.

== International career ==
He made his senior international debut for Sierra Leone in 2013, and has appeared in FIFA World Cup qualifying matches. He was a squad member at the 2021 AFCON.

== Career statistics ==
=== International ===
As of match played 13 November 2021

Sierra Leone national team
Year	Apps	Goals
2013	2	0
2014	4	1
2015	2	0
2016	1	0
2017	1	0
2018	1	0
2019	4	0
2020	2	0
2021	4	0
Total	21	1

=== International goals ===
As of 9 November 2016

#	Date	Venue	Opponent	Score	Result	Competition	Ref
1.	19 November 2014	Stade Tata Raphaël, Kinshasa, DR Congo	DR Congo	1–0	1–3	2015 Africa Cup of Nations qualification	
