= Bratislav Punoševac =

Serbian footballer

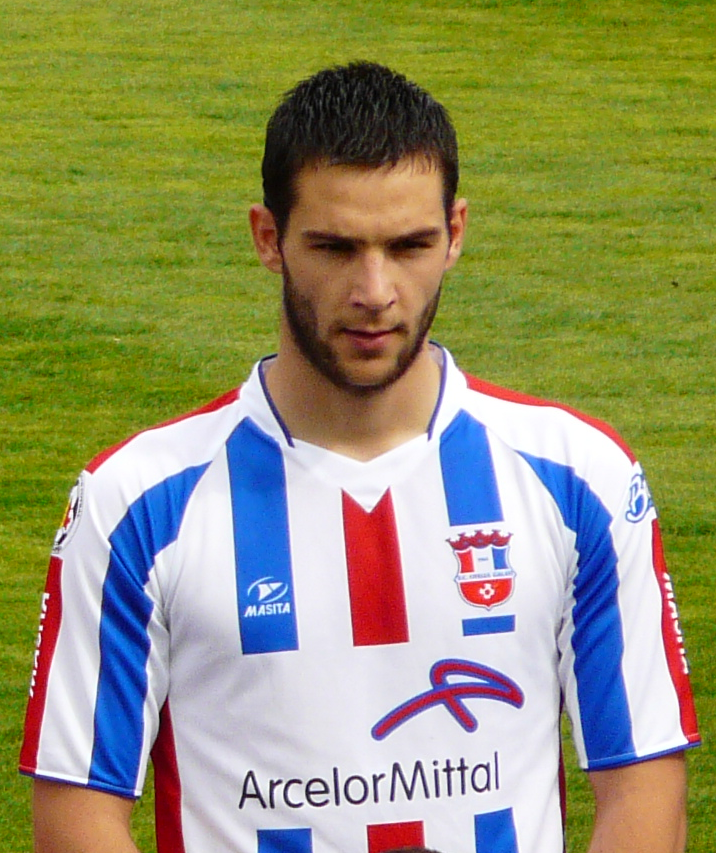
- Punoševac with Oțelul Galați in 2011

Personal information
- Date of birth: 9 July 1987 (age 39)
- Place of birth: Kruševac, SFR Yugoslavia
- Height: 1.89 m (6 ft 2 in)
- Position: Forward

Youth career
- Partizan
- 2004–2005: Napredak Kruševac

Senior career*
Years	Team	Apps	(Gls)
2005–2010	Napredak Kruševac	76	(13)
2011–2013	Oțelul Galați	41	(6)
2013	→ Târgu Mureș (loan)	8	(3)
2013–2014	Avispa Fukuoka	19	(0)
2014	Radnički Niš	9	(1)
2015	Honvéd	11	(2)
2015–2016	Békéscsaba	27	(3)
2016	Napredak Kruševac	12	(2)
2017	Borac Čačak	14	(1)
2017	Dacia Chișinău	16	(4)
2018	Kyzylzhar	15	(4)
2018–2019	Kaisar	26	(7)
2020	Taraz	12	(0)
2022–2023	Trayal Kruševac	18	(1)
Total		304	(46)
- * Club domestic league appearances and goals

Bratislav Punoševac (Serbian Cyrillic: Братислав Пуношевац; born 9 July 1987) is a Serbian retired footballer.

In his home country, Punoševac played for Serbian SuperLiga clubs Napredak Kruševac, Radnički Niš and Borac Čačak. He also spent several years abroad in Romania, Japan, Hungary, Moldova and Kazakhstan, respectively.

== Career ==
On 25 September 2019, Punoševac was released by FC Kaisar.

On 22 January 2020, he joined Taraz.

== Honours ==
Oțelul Galați

- Liga I: 2010–11
- Supercupa României: 2011
