= 2020 FC Kaisar season =

FC Kaisar
2020 season
- Chairman: Nurlan Abuov
- Manager: Stoycho Mladenov
- Stadium: Gani Muratbayev Stadium
- Premier League: 7th
- Super Cup: Runners-up
- Kazakhstan Cup: Canceled due to the COVID-19 pandemic
- UEFA Europa League: Second Qualifying Round vs APOEL
- Top goalscorer: League: Elguja Lobjanidze (8); All: Elguja Lobjanidze (9)
| Home colours | Away colours |

The 2020 FC Kaisar season was the club's fourth season back in the Kazakhstan Premier League, the highest tier of association football in Kazakhstan, and 23rd in total. As well as participating in the Kazakhstan Premier League, Kaisar will defend their title in the Kazakhstan Cup. On 29 February they began their season losing 1–0 to Astana in the Kazakhstan Super Cup.

== Season events ==
On 13 March, the Football Federation of Kazakhstan announced all league fixtures would be played behind closed doors for the foreseeable future due to the COVID-19 pandemic. On 16 March the Football Federation of Kazakhstan suspended all football until 15 April.

On 30 May, the Professional Football League of Kazakhstan announced that Irtysh Pavlodar had withdrawn from the league due to financial issues, with all their matches being excluded from the league results.

On 26 July, it was announced that the league would resume on 1 July, with no fans being permitted to watch the games. The league was suspended for a second time on 3 July, for an initial two weeks, due to an increase in COVID-19 cases in the country.

== Squad ==
As of match played 27 November 2020

| No. | Name | Nationality | Position | Date of birth (age) | Signed from | Signed in | Contract ends | Apps. | Goals |
Goalkeepers
| 1 | Aleksandr Zarutskiy | (Kazakhstan) | GK | 26 August 1993 (age 33) | Irtysh Pavlodar | 2020 | | 18 | 0 |
| 34 | Nurymzhan Salaidin | (Kazakhstan) | GK | 27 October 1995 (age 31) | Baikonur | 2018 | | | |
| 71 | Marsel Islamkulov | (Kyrgyzstan) | GK | 18 April 1994 (age 32) | Baikonur | 2016 | | | |
Defenders
| 2 | Yeldos Akhmetov | (Kazakhstan) | DF | 1 June 1990 (age 36) | Kairat | 2020 | | 3 | 0 |
| 5 | Bagdat Kairov | (Kazakhstan) | DF | 17 April 1993 (age 33) | Aktobe | 2020 | | 22 | 0 |
| 13 | Ilyas Amirseitov | (Kazakhstan) | DF | 22 October 1989 (age 37) | Zhetysu | 2017 | | 105 | 0 |
| 14 | Mark Gorman | (Kazakhstan) | DF | 9 February 1989 (age 37) | Tobol | 2018 | | 48 | 0 |
| 22 | Aleksandr Marochkin | (Kazakhstan) | DF | 14 July 1990 (age 36) | loan from Tobol | 2020 | | | |
| 23 | Olzhas Altayev | (Kazakhstan) | DF | 15 July 1989 (age 37) | Kyzylzhar | 2019 | | | |
| 55 | Ivan Graf | (Croatia) | DF | 17 June 1987 (age 39) | Irtysh Pavlodar | 2016 | | | |
| 61 | Dinmukhamed Kashken | (Kazakhstan) | DF | 4 January 2000 (age 26) | loan from Astana | 2020 | | 8 | 0 |
| 77 | Kuanysh Kalmuratov | (Kazakhstan) | DF | 27 August 1996 (age 30) | loan from Atyrau | 2020 | | | |
Midfielders
| 3 | Abylaykhan Tolegenov | (Kazakhstan) | MF | 13 July 1992 (age 34) | Baikonur | 2020 | | | |
| 6 | Ruslan Duysenbaev | (Kazakhstan) | MF | 22 April 1993 (age 33) | Baikonur | 2020 | | | |
| 8 | Askhat Tagybergen | (Kazakhstan) | MF | 9 August 1990 (age 36) | Astana | 2018 | | 129 | 18 |
| 10 | Duman Narzildaev | (Kazakhstan) | MF | 6 September 1993 (age 33) | Youth Team | 2011 | | | |
| 11 | Shokhan Abzalov | (Kazakhstan) | MF | 11 September 1993 (age 33) | Baikonur | 2019 | | 19 | 1 |
| 17 | Bekzat Kurmanbekuly | (Kazakhstan) | MF | 14 April 2000 (age 26) | Youth team | 2019 | | 2 | 0 |
| 19 | Clarence Bitang | (Cameroon) | MF | 2 September 1992 (age 34) | Vardar | 2019 | | 35 | 0 |
| 39 | Aleksandar Stanisavljević | (Serbia) | MF | 11 June 1989 (age 37) | Caspiy | 2020 | | 18 | 0 |
| 70 | Ayan Kulmaganbetov | (Kazakhstan) | MF | 11 November 2000 (age 26) | Youth Team | 2020 | | 4 | 0 |
| 94 | Alvin Fortes | (Cape Verde) | MF | 25 May 1994 (age 32) | Dila Gori | 2020 | | 16 | 1 |
| 96 | Maxim Fedin | (Kazakhstan) | MF | 8 June 1996 (age 30) | loan from Tobol | 2020 | 2020 | 16 | 0 |
Forwards
| 7 | Aleksandar Kolev | (Bulgaria) | FW | 8 December 1992 (age 33) | Raków Częstochowa | 2020 | | 15 | 0 |
| 9 | Elguja Lobjanidze | (Georgia (country)) | FW | 17 September 1992 (age 34) | Taraz | 2020 | | 15 | 9 |
| 15 | Elzhas Altynbekov | (Kazakhstan) | FW | 22 November 1993 (age 32) | Zhetysu | 2020 | | 4 | 1 |
| 29 | Orken Makhan | (Kazakhstan) | FW | 27 January 1998 (age 28) | Youth Team | 2018 | | 11 | 1 |
| 99 | Reginaldo | (Mozambique) | FW | 14 June 1990 (age 36) | Shakhter Karagandy | 2020 | | 18 | 2 |
Players away on loan
Left during the season
| 1 | Aleksandr Grigorenko | (Kazakhstan) | GK | 6 February 1985 (age 41) | Taraz | 2017 | | 58 | 0 |
| 15 | Rizvan Ablitarov | (Ukraine) | DF | 18 April 1989 (age 37) | Atyrau | 2020 | | 0 | 0 |
| 39 | Aleksei Shumskikh | (Russia) | DF | 1 July 1990 (age 36) | Tom Tomsk | 2020 | | 1 | 0 |
| 88 | Magomed Paragulgov | (Kazakhstan) | MF | 26 March 1994 (age 32) | Kairat | 2020 | | 3 | 0 |
| 92 | Ivan Pešić | (Croatia) | MF | 6 April 1992 (age 34) | Dinamo București | 2020 | | 3 | 0 |

== Transfers ==
=== In ===
| Date | Position | Nationality | Name | From | Fee | Ref. |
|---|---|---|---|---|---|---|
| Winter 2020 | MF | (Kazakhstan) | Abylaykhan Tolegenov | Baikonur | Undisclosed | |
| Winter 2020 | FW | (Bulgaria) | Aleksandar Kolev | Raków Częstochowa | Undisclosed | |
| 11 January 2020 | DF | (Kazakhstan) | Yeldos Akhmetov | Kairat | Undisclosed | |
| 11 January 2020 | DF | (Kazakhstan) | Bagdat Kairov | Aktobe | Undisclosed | |
| 13 January 2020 | FW | (Georgia (country)) | Elguja Lobjanidze | Taraz | Undisclosed | |
| 14 January 2020 | MF | (Cape Verde) | Alvin Fortes | Dila Gori | Undisclosed | |
| 15 January 2020 | DF | (Ukraine) | Rizvan Ablitarov | Atyrau | Undisclosed | |
| 5 February 2020 | FW | (Mozambique) | Reginaldo | Shakhter Karagandy | Undisclosed | |
| 10 February 2020 | DF | (Russia) | Aleksei Shumskikh | Tom Tomsk | Undisclosed | |
| 15 February 2020 | MF | (Croatia) | Ivan Pešić | Dinamo București | Undisclosed | |
| 17 February 2020 | MF | (Kazakhstan) | Magomed Paragulgov | Kairat | Undisclosed | |
| 19 July 2020 | GK | (Kazakhstan) | Aleksandr Zarutskiy | Irtysh Pavlodar | Free | |
| 28 July 2020 | FW | (Kazakhstan) | Elzhas Altynbekov | Zhetysu | Undisclosed | |
| 29 July 2020 | DF | (Kazakhstan) | Timur Rudoselskiy | | Free | |
| 9 August 2020 | MF | (Serbia) | Aleksandar Stanisavljević | Caspiy | Undisclosed | |

=== Loans in ===
| Date | Position | Nationality | Name | From | Fee | Ref. |
|---|---|---|---|---|---|---|
| 13 January 2020 | MF | (Kazakhstan) | Kuanysh Kalmuratov | Atyrau | End of Season | |
| 16 February 2020 | DF | (Kazakhstan) | Aleksandr Marochkin | Tobol | End of Season | |
| 4 April 2020 | MF | (Kazakhstan) | Maxim Fedin | Tobol | End of Season | |

=== Out ===
| Date | Position | Nationality | Name | To | Fee | Ref. |
|---|---|---|---|---|---|---|
| 24 January 2020 | MF | (Armenia) | Tigran Barseghyan | Astana | Undisclosed | |
| 7 August 2020 | MF | (Croatia) | Ivan Pešić | Vorskla Poltava | Undisclosed | |
| 10 September 2020 | DF | (Ukraine) | Rizvan Ablitarov | Olimpik Donetsk | Undisclosed | |

=== Released ===
| Date | Position | Nationality | Name | Joined | Date | Ref. |
|---|---|---|---|---|---|---|
| 30 June 2020 | GK | (Kazakhstan) | Aleksandr Grigorenko | | | |
| 30 June 2020 | DF | (Russia) | Aleksei Shumskikh | Nizhny Novgorod | 1 June 2020 | |
| 5 August 2020 | DF | (Kazakhstan) | Timur Rudoselskiy | Lori | 21 August 2020 | |
| 9 September 2020 | MF | (Kazakhstan) | Magomed Paragulgov | Ermis Aradippou | | |

== Competitions ==
=== Super Cup ===
| 29 February 2020 | Astana | 1 – 0 | Kaisar | Kostanay |
| 17:00 (UTC+6) | Shomko (yellow card) 10'; Postnikov (yellow card) 37'; Sotiriou 40' (yellow card) 53' | Report | Graf (yellow card) 13'; Bitang (yellow card) 29' | Stadium: Tobol Arena; Attendance: 2,900; Referee: Anatolyi Vishnichenko |

=== Premier League ===
==== Results summary ====
| Overall | | | | | | | | Home | | | | | | Away | | | | | |
| Pld | W | D | L | GF | GA | GD | Pts | W | D | L | GF | GA | GD | W | D | L | GF | GA | GD |
|---|---|---|---|---|---|---|---|---|---|---|---|---|---|---|---|---|---|---|---|
| 20 | 6 | 6 | 8 | 20 | 23 | −3 | 24 | 3 | 4 | 3 | 10 | 9 | +1 | 3 | 2 | 5 | 10 | 14 | −4 |

Last updated: 27 November 2020.
Source: See Results

==== Results by round ====
| Round | 1 | 2 | 3 | 4 | 5 | 6 | 7 | 8 | 9 | 10 | 11 | 12 | 13 | 14 | 15 | 16 | 17 | 18 | 19 | 20 | 21 | 22 |
|---|---|---|---|---|---|---|---|---|---|---|---|---|---|---|---|---|---|---|---|---|---|---|
| Ground | - | A | H | A | H | A | H | A | H | A | A | H | A | H | A | H | A | H | A | A | H | - |
| Result | - | W | D | W | W | L | W | L | D | L | D | D | D | W | L | L | L | D | W | L | L | - |
| Position | - | 3 | 4 | 4 | 4 | 2 | 2 | 4 | 5 | 6 | 7 | 6 | 5 | 5 | 5 | 5 | 7 | 7 | 7 | 7 | 7 | - |

Source: See Results
A = Away; H = Home; W = Win; D = Draw; L = Loss

==== Results ====
| 8 March 2020 1 | Kaisar | 1 – 0 | Irtysh Pavlodar | Kyzylorda |
| 17:00 (UTC+6) | Lobjanidze 11'; Tagybergen (yellow card) 42'; Narzildaev (yellow card) 52'; Reginaldo (yellow card) 53'; Marochkin (yellow card) 84' | Report | | Stadium: Gani Muratbayev Stadium; Attendance: 2,500; Referee: Artyom Kuchin |
Note: Match result annulled on 30 May.

| 15 March 2020 2 | Okzhetpes | 0 – 1 | Kaisar | Kokshetau |
| 15:00 (UTC+6) | S.Zhumakhanov (yellow card) 36'; Zorić (yellow card) 57'; Gian (yellow card) 59' | Report | Lobjanidze 10' (yellow card) 14'; Pešić (yellow card) 50'; Bitang (yellow card) 61'; B.Kairov (yellow card) 68' | Stadium: Okzhetpes Stadium; Attendance: 0 Referee: Bolat Saryev |

| 1 July 2020 3 | Kaisar | 1 – 1 | Taraz | Kyzylorda |
| 20:00 (UTC+6) | Narzildaev 41'; B.Kairov (yellow card) 48'; Reginaldo (yellow card) 60' | Report | Silva 49'; A.Taubay (yellow card) 58' | Stadium: Gani Muratbayev Stadium; Attendance: 0 Referee: Ruslan Omarov |
Note: Match originally scheduled for 21 March, but postponed on 16 March due to the COVID-19 pandemic.

| 19 August 2020 4 | Shakhter Karagandy | 0 – 1 | Kaisar | Almaty |
| 18:00 (UTC+6) | Takulov (yellow card) 23'; Bakayev (yellow card) 24'; Yurchenko (yellow card) 90+3' | Report | Graf (yellow card) 29'; Bitang (yellow card) 50'; Marochkin 67'; A.Zarutskiy (yellow card) 90+2'; Fedin (yellow card) 90+3' | Stadium: T.S.Segïzbaeva Academy Stadium; Attendance: 0 Referee: Denis Izmailov |
Note: Match originally scheduled for 3 April and then 4 July, but postponed twice due to the COVID-19 pandemic. Match played at the T.S.Segïzbaeva Academy Stadium in Almaty, instead of Shakhter Karagandy's regular Shakhter Stadium in Karaganda. Match played behind closed doors due to the COVID-19 pandemic.

| 22 August 2020 5 | Kaisar | 1 – 0 | Zhetysu | Almaty |
| 18:00 (UTC+6) | Tagybergen (yellow card) 14'; Narzildaev (yellow card) 24'; Lobjanidze 75'; Bitang (yellow card) 84' | Report | Mawutor (yellow card) 35' | Stadium: T.S.Segïzbaeva Academy Stadium; Referee: Timur Kumashev |
Note: Match originally scheduled for 11 April and then 10 July, but postponed twice due to the COVID-19 pandemic. Match played at the T.S.Segïzbaeva Academy Stadium in Almaty, instead of Shakhter Karagandy's regular Gani Muratbayev Stadium in Kyzylorda. Match played behind closed doors due to the COVID-19 pandemic.

| 26 August 2020 6 | Caspiy | 1 – 0 | Kaisar | Almaty |
| 21:00 (UTC+6) | Čubrilo (yellow card) 2'; M.Taykenov (yellow card) 25'; Nurgaliyev (yellow card) 45+2'; Bukorac (yellow card) 47' (goal) 65'; R.Aslan (yellow card) 90+2'; Milošević (yellow card) 90+3' | Report | Narzildaev (yellow card) 14'; Tagybergen (yellow card) 44'; B.Kairov (yellow card) 70'; Bitang (yellow card) 90+5' | Stadium: Jas Qyran Stadium; Attendance: 0 Referee: Sergey Gorokhovodatskiy |
Note: Match played at the Jas Qyran Stadium in Almaty, instead of Caspiy's regular Zhastar Stadium in Aktau. Match played behind closed doors due to the COVID-19 pandemic.

| 29 August 2020 7 | Kaisar | 2 – 1 | Tobol | Almaty |
| 18:30 (UTC+6) | Graf (yellow card) 5'; Reginaldo 20'; Stanisavljević (yellow card) 60'; Tagybergen 76' | Report | Miroshnichenko (yellow card) 45'; Malyi 63'; Muzhikov (yellow card) 81' | Stadium: Central Stadium; Attendance: 0 Referee: Aydin Rakhimbayev |
Note: Match played at the Central Stadium in Almaty, instead of Kaisar's regular Gani Muratbayev Stadium in Kyzylorda. Match played behind closed doors due to the COVID-19 pandemic.

| 12 September 2020 8 | Kairat | 2 – 1 | Kaisar | Almaty |
| 20:00 (UTC+6) | S.Keyler (yellow card) 8'; Góralski (yellow card) 26'; Alykulov (yellow card) 37'; Abiken 72'; Eseola 90+2' (yellow card) 90+2' | Report | Narzildaev (yellow card) 4'; Kolev (yellow card) 38'; Lobjanidze 44'; Stanisavljević (yellow card) 71' | Stadium: Central Stadium; Attendance: 0 Referee: Igor Chesnokov |
Note: Match played behind closed doors due to the COVID-19 pandemic.

| 20 September 2020 9 | Kaisar | 1 – 1 | Ordabasy | Almaty |
| 18:00 (UTC+6) | Reginaldo 55'; Marochkin (yellow card) 57'; Fortes (yellow card) 70'; I.Amirseitov (yellow card) 71'; E.Altynbekov (yellow card) 90+6' | Report | João Paulo 25'; Badibanga (yellow card) 35'; Astanov (yellow card) 90+3' | Stadium: Central Stadium; Attendance: 0 Referee: Bakhyt Kyzylbaev |
Note: Match played at the Central Stadium in Almaty, instead of Kaisar's regular Gani Muratbayev Stadium in Kyzylorda. Match played behind closed doors due to the COVID-19 pandemic.

| 24 September 2020 10 | Kaisar | 0 – 1 | Astana | Almaty |
| 18:00 (UTC+6) | Bitang (yellow card) 23'; Kolev (yellow card) 30'; Fortes (yellow card) 63'; Gorman (yellow card) 78'; Stanisavljević (yellow card) 90' | Report | Tomašević 87'; Logvinenko (yellow card) 90+3' | Stadium: Central Stadium; Attendance: 0 Referee: Bagdat Abdullaev |
Note: Match played at the Central Stadium in Almaty, instead of Kaisar's regular Gani Muratbayev Stadium in Kyzylorda. Match played behind closed doors due to the COVID-19 pandemic.

| 28 September 2020 11 | Kyzylzhar | 0 – 0 | Kaisar | Almaty |
| 14:00 (UTC+6) | A.Kasym (yellow card) 57'; Koné (yellow card) 90' | Report | I.Amirseitov (yellow card) 31'; Narzildaev (yellow card) 48'; Tagybergen (yellow card) 64' | Stadium: T.S.Segïzbaeva Academy Stadium; Attendance: 0 Referee: Saken Bayimbet |
Note: Match played at the T.S.Segïzbaeva Academy Stadium in Almaty, instead of Kyzylzhar's regular Karasai Stadium in Petropavl. Match played behind closed doors due to the COVID-19 pandemic.

| 2 October 2020 12 | Kaisar | 0 – 0 | Okzhetpes | Almaty |
| 13:30 (UTC+6) | Bitang (yellow card) 13'; Gorman (yellow card) 72'; Narzildaev (yellow card) 74'; I.Amirseitov (yellow card) 79' (yellow-red card) 88' | Report | Dmitrijev (yellow card) 81' | Stadium: T.S.Segïzbaeva Academy Stadium; Attendance: 0 Referee: Denis Tevyashov |
Note: Match played at the T.S.Segïzbaeva Academy Stadium in Almaty, instead of Kaisar's regular Gani Muratbayev Stadium in Kyzylorda. Match played behind closed doors due to the COVID-19 pandemic.

| 17 October 2020 13 | Taraz | 2 – 2 | Kaisar | Talgar |
| 15:00 (UTC+6) | Nyuiadzi (yellow card) 21' (goal) 25'; Turysbek 23'; M.Amirkhanov (yellow card) 40' | Report | Reginaldo (yellow card) 38'; Lobjanidze 61', 82' (yellow card) 85' | Stadium: UTB Talgar; Attendance: 0 Referee: Sergey Gorokhovodatskiy |
Note: Match played at the UTB Talgar stadium in Talgar, instead of Taraz's regular Central Stadium in Taraz. Match played behind closed doors due to the COVID-19 pandemic.

| 22 October 2020 14 | Kaisar | 2 – 0 | Shakhter Karagandy | Almaty |
| 14:00 (UTC+6) | Tagybergen (yellow card) 33' (goal) 36'; Lobjanidze 55' | Report | Lamanje (yellow card) 48'; Takulov (yellow card) 58'; Tkachuk (yellow card) 65' | Stadium: T.S.Segïzbaeva Academy Stadium; Attendance: 0 Referee: Denis Tevyashov |
Note: Match played at the T.S.Segïzbaeva Academy Stadium in Almaty, instead of Kaisar's regular Gani Muratbayev Stadium in Kyzylorda. Match played behind closed doors due to the COVID-19 pandemic.

| 26 October 2020 15 | Zhetysu | 3 – 1 | Kaisar | Almaty |
| 14:00 (UTC+6) | Darabayev 29'; M.Sapanov (yellow card) 54'; Mawutor 71'; Zhaksylykov 80' | Report | Stanisavljević (yellow card) 21'; Kolev (red card) 41'; Fortes 48'; Graf (yellow card) 70'; S.Abzalov (yellow card) 89' | Stadium: T.S.Segïzbaeva Academy Stadium; Attendance: 0 Referee: Georgiy Chekhovskiy |
Note: Match played at the T.S.Segïzbaeva Academy Stadium in Almaty, instead of Zhetysu's regular Zhetysu Stadium in Taldıqorğan. Match played behind closed doors due to the COVID-19 pandemic.

| 30 October 2020 16 | Kaisar | 0 – 1 | Caspiy | Almaty |
| 19:00 (UTC+6) | Fedin (yellow card) 33'; B.Kairov (yellow card) 45'; Graf (yellow card) 81' | Report | Sebaihi (yellow card) 39'; Bukorac (yellow card) 45'; Adams (yellow card) 75'; M.Gabyshev 77'; Čubrilo (yellow card) 79' | Stadium: Central Stadium; Attendance: 0 Referee: Aydin Rakhimbayev |
Note: Match played at the Central Stadium in Almaty, instead of Kaisar's regular Gani Muratbayev Stadium in Kyzylorda. Match played behind closed doors due to the COVID-19 pandemic.

| 3 November 2020 17 | Tobol | 3 – 0 | Kaisar | Almaty |
| 17:00 (UTC+6) | Sebai (yellow card) 20' (goal) 53'; Manzorro 57'; S.Zharynbetov 77'; Abilgazy (yellow card) 82' | Report | S.Abzalov (yellow card) 8'; Gorman (yellow card) 65' | Stadium: Jas Qyran Stadium; Attendance: 0 Referee: Aleksandr Gauzer |
Note: Match played at the Jas Qyran Stadium in Almaty, instead of Tobol's regular Central Stadium in Kostanay. Match played behind closed doors due to the COVID-19 pandemic.

| 7 November 2020 18 | Kaisar | 2 – 2 | Kairat | Almaty |
| 15:00 (UTC+6) | Narzildaev (yellow card) 42'; Graf (yellow card) 44' (goal) 89'; Lobjanidze 70'; I.Amirseitov (yellow card) 82' | Report | Wrzesiński (yellow card) 37' (goal) 64'; S.Keyler 45'; Alip (yellow card) 71'; Eseola (yellow card) 88'; N.Dairov (yellow card) 90+5' | Stadium: Jas Qyran Stadium; Attendance: 0 Referee: Zhandos Abzhan |
Note: Match played at the Jas Qyran Stadium in Almaty, instead of Kaisar's regular Gani Muratbayev Stadium in Kyzylorda. Match played behind closed doors due to the COVID-19 pandemic.

| 21 November 2020 19 | Ordabasy | 0 – 3 | Kaisar | Almaty |
| 14:00 (UTC+6) | Dmitrenko (yellow card) 29'; Dosmagambetov (red card) 65'; Diakate (yellow card) 85' | Report | Graf (yellow card) 17' (goal) 52'; I.Amirseitov (yellow card) 26'; Narzildaev (yellow card) 39'; Bitang (yellow card) 65'; Tagybergen 69', 75'; Stanisavljević (yellow card) 85' | Stadium: T.S.Segïzbaeva Academy Stadium; Attendance: 0 Referee: Bolat Saryev |
Note: Match played at the T.S.Segïzbaeva Academy Stadium in Almaty, instead of Ordabasy's regular Kazhymukan Munaitpasov Stadium in Shymkent. Match played behind closed doors due to the COVID-19 pandemic.

| 24 November 2020 20 | Astana | 3 – 1 | Kaisar | Almaty |
| 13:00 (UTC+6) | Tomasov 25'; Beisebekov (yellow card) 41'; Logvinenko (yellow card) 49'; Sotiriou 61', 73' (pen.) | Report | Fedin 30' (yellow card) 31'; D.Kashken (yellow card) 57' | Stadium: Jas Qyran Stadium; Attendance: 0 Referee: Saken Bayimbet |
Note: Match played at the Jas Qyran Stadium in Almaty, instead of Astana's regular Astana Arena in Nur-Sultan. Match played behind closed doors due to the COVID-19 pandemic.

| 27 November 2020 21 | Kaisar | 1 – 2 | Kyzylzhar | Almaty |
| 14:00 (UTC+6) | E.Altynbekov 44' (yellow card) 83' | Report | M.Skorykh 20'; A.Kasym 79'; A.Cheredinov (yellow card) 82' | Stadium: T.S.Segïzbaeva Academy Stadium; Attendance: 0 Referee: Timur Kumashev |
Note: Match played at the T.S.Segïzbaeva Academy Stadium in Almaty, instead of Kaisar's regular Gani Muratbayev Stadium in Kyzylorda. Match played behind closed doors due to the COVID-19 pandemic.

==== League table ====
| Pos | Team | Pld | W | D | L | GF | GA | GD | Pts |
|---|---|---|---|---|---|---|---|---|---|
| 5 | Ordabasy | 20 | 9 | 4 | 7 | 27 | 26 | +1 | 31 |
| 6 | Zhetysu | 20 | 9 | 1 | 10 | 27 | 28 | −1 | 28 |
| 7 | Kaisar | 20 | 6 | 6 | 8 | 20 | 23 | −3 | 24 |
| 8 | Taraz | 20 | 5 | 8 | 7 | 19 | 23 | −4 | 23 |
| 9 | Kyzylzhar | 20 | 6 | 5 | 9 | 15 | 24 | −9 | 23 |

Source: UEFA, Soccerway
Rules for classification: 1) Points; 2) Goal difference; 3) Matches won; 4) Goals scored; 5) Away goals scored; 6) Head-to-head points; 7) Head-to-head matches won; 8) Head-to-head goal difference; 9) Head-to-head goals scored; 10) Head-to-head away goals scored; 11) Draw.

=== Kazakhstan Cup ===
| July 2020 Last 16 | – |
| (UTC+6) |

=== UEFA Europa League ===
==== Qualifying rounds ====
| 17 September 2020 Second qualifying round | Kaisar (Kazakhstan) | 1 – 4 | (Cyprus) APOEL | Shymkent, Kazakhstan |
| 18:00 (UTC+6) | Lobjanidze 6'; Marochkin (yellow card) 28'; Bitang (yellow card) 41'; Tagybergen (yellow card) 59'; Kolev (yellow card) 79' | Report | De Vincenti 15', 90+3'; Tuhami 25'; Atzili 48' | Stadium: Kazhymukan Munaitpasov Stadium; Attendance: 0 Referee: Jens Maae (Denmark) |
Note: Match played the Kazhymukan Munaitpasov Stadium in Shymkent, instead of Kaisar's regular stadium Gani Muratbayev Stadium in Kyzylorda. Match played behind closed doors due to the COVID-19 pandemic.

== Squad statistics ==
As of match played 27 November 2020

=== Appearances and goals ===
| No. | Pos | Nat | Player | Total | | Premier League | | Kazakhstan Cup | | Super Cup | | Europa League | |
| No. | Pos | Nat | Player | Apps | Goals | Apps | Goals | Apps | Goals | Apps | Goals | Apps | Goals |
|---|---|---|---|---|---|---|---|---|---|---|---|---|---|
| 1 | GK | (Kazakhstan) KAZ | Aleksandr Zarutskiy | 18 | 0 | 17 | 0 | 0 | 0 | 0 | 0 | 1 | 0 |
| 2 | DF | (Kazakhstan) KAZ | Yeldos Akhmetov | 3 | 0 | 0+3 | 0 | 0 | 0 | 0 | 0 | 0 | 0 |
| 3 | MF | (Kazakhstan) KAZ | Abylaykhan Tolegenov | 1 | 0 | 0+1 | 0 | 0 | 0 | 0 | 0 | 0 | 0 |
| 5 | DF | (Kazakhstan) KAZ | Bagdat Kairov | 22 | 0 | 20 | 0 | 0 | 0 | 1 | 0 | 1 | 0 |
| 6 | MF | (Kazakhstan) KAZ | Ruslan Duysenbaev | 1 | 0 | 0+1 | 0 | 0 | 0 | 0 | 0 | 0 | 0 |
| 7 | FW | (Bulgaria) BUL | Aleksandar Kolev | 15 | 0 | 7+6 | 0 | 0 | 0 | 0+1 | 0 | 1 | 0 |
| 8 | MF | (Kazakhstan) KAZ | Askhat Tagybergen | 16 | 4 | 14 | 4 | 0 | 0 | 1 | 0 | 1 | 0 |
| 9 | FW | (Georgia (country)) GEO | Elguja Lobjanidze | 15 | 9 | 13 | 8 | 0 | 0 | 1 | 0 | 1 | 1 |
| 10 | MF | (Kazakhstan) KAZ | Duman Narzildaev | 20 | 1 | 18 | 1 | 0 | 0 | 1 | 0 | 1 | 0 |
| 11 | MF | (Kazakhstan) KAZ | Shokhan Abzalov | 5 | 0 | 1+4 | 0 | 0 | 0 | 0 | 0 | 0 | 0 |
| 13 | DF | (Kazakhstan) KAZ | Ilyas Amirseitov | 21 | 0 | 19 | 0 | 0 | 0 | 1 | 0 | 1 | 0 |
| 14 | DF | (Kazakhstan) KAZ | Mark Gorman | 18 | 0 | 10+7 | 0 | 0 | 0 | 0 | 0 | 0+1 | 0 |
| 15 | FW | (Kazakhstan) KAZ | Elzhas Altynbekov | 4 | 1 | 2+2 | 1 | 0 | 0 | 0 | 0 | 0 | 0 |
| 19 | MF | (Cameroon) CMR | Clarence Bitang | 21 | 0 | 15+4 | 0 | 0 | 0 | 1 | 0 | 1 | 0 |
| 22 | DF | (Kazakhstan) KAZ | Aleksandr Marochkin | 21 | 1 | 19 | 1 | 0 | 0 | 1 | 0 | 1 | 0 |
| 23 | DF | (Kazakhstan) KAZ | Olzhas Altaev | 9 | 0 | 2+7 | 0 | 0 | 0 | 0 | 0 | 0 | 0 |
| 29 | FW | (Kazakhstan) KAZ | Orken Makhan | 1 | 0 | 0+1 | 0 | 0 | 0 | 0 | 0 | 0 | 0 |
| 34 | GK | (Kazakhstan) KAZ | Nurymzhan Salaidin | 1 | 0 | 1 | 0 | 0 | 0 | 0 | 0 | 0 | 0 |
| 39 | MF | (Serbia) SRB | Aleksandar Stanisavljević | 18 | 0 | 12+5 | 0 | 0 | 0 | 0 | 0 | 0+1 | 0 |
| 55 | DF | (Croatia) CRO | Ivan Graf | 20 | 2 | 18 | 2 | 0 | 0 | 1 | 0 | 1 | 0 |
| 61 | DF | (Kazakhstan) KAZ | Dinmukhamed Kashken | 8 | 0 | 2+5 | 0 | 0 | 0 | 0 | 0 | 0+1 | 0 |
| 70 | MF | (Kazakhstan) KAZ | Ayan Kulmaganbetov | 4 | 0 | 0+4 | 0 | 0 | 0 | 0 | 0 | 0 | 0 |
| 71 | GK | (Kyrgyzstan) KGZ | Marsel Islamkulov | 4 | 0 | 3 | 0 | 0 | 0 | 1 | 0 | 0 | 0 |
| 77 | DF | (Kazakhstan) KAZ | Kuanysh Kalmuratov | 2 | 0 | 2 | 0 | 0 | 0 | 0 | 0 | 0 | 0 |
| 94 | MF | (Cape Verde) CPV | Alvin Fortes | 16 | 1 | 7+8 | 1 | 0 | 0 | 0+1 | 0 | 0 | 0 |
| 96 | MF | (Kazakhstan) KAZ | Maxim Fedin | 16 | 1 | 13+2 | 1 | 0 | 0 | 0 | 0 | 1 | 0 |
| 99 | FW | (Mozambique) MOZ | Reginaldo | 18 | 2 | 13+4 | 2 | 0 | 0 | 1 | 0 | 0 | 0 |
Players away from Kaisar on loan:
Players who left Kaisar during the season:
| 39 | DF | (Russia) RUS | Aleksei Shumskikh | 1 | 0 | 0+1 | 0 | 0 | 0 | 0 | 0 | 0 | 0 |
| 88 | MF | (Kazakhstan) KAZ | Magomed Paragulgov | 3 | 0 | 1+1 | 0 | 0 | 0 | 0+1 | 0 | 0 | 0 |
| 92 | MF | (Croatia) CRO | Ivan Pešić | 3 | 0 | 2 | 0 | 0 | 0 | 1 | 0 | 0 | 0 |

=== Goal scorers ===
| Place | Position | Nation | Number | Name | Premier League | Kazakhstan Cup | Super Cup | Europa League | Total |
|---|---|---|---|---|---|---|---|---|---|
| 1 | FW | (Georgia (country)) | 9 | Elguja Lobjanidze | 8 | 0 | 0 | 1 | 9 |
| 2 | MF | (Kazakhstan) | 8 | Askhat Tagybergen | 4 | 0 | 0 | 0 | 4 |
| 3 | FW | (Mozambique) | 99 | Reginaldo | 2 | 0 | 0 | 0 | 2 |
| 3 | DF | (Croatia) | 55 | Ivan Graf | 2 | 0 | 0 | 0 | 2 |
| 5 | MF | (Kazakhstan) | 10 | Duman Narzildaev | 1 | 0 | 0 | 0 | 1 |
| 5 | DF | (Kazakhstan) | 22 | Aleksandr Marochkin | 1 | 0 | 0 | 0 | 1 |
| 5 | MF | (Cape Verde) | 94 | Alvin Fortes | 1 | 0 | 0 | 0 | 1 |
| 5 | MF | (Kazakhstan) | 96 | Maxim Fedin | 1 | 0 | 0 | 0 | 1 |
| 5 | FW | (Kazakhstan) | 15 | Elzhas Altynbekov | 1 | 0 | 0 | 0 | 1 |
| | | | | TOTALS | 20 | 0 | 0 | 1 | 21 |

=== Clean sheets ===
| Place | Position | Nation | Number | Name | Premier League | Kazakhstan Cup | Super Cup | Europa League | Total |
|---|---|---|---|---|---|---|---|---|---|
| 1 | GK | (Kazakhstan) | 1 | Aleksandr Zarutskiy | 6 | 0 | 0 | 0 | 6 |
| 2 | GK | (Kyrgyzstan) | 71 | Marsel Islamkulov | 2 | 0 | 0 | 0 | 2 |
| | | | | TOTALS | 8 | 0 | 0 | 0 | 8 |

=== Disciplinary record ===
| Number | Nation | Position | Name | Premier League | | Kazakhstan Cup | | Super Cup | | Europa League | | Total | |
| Number | Nation | Position | Name | Yellow card | Red card | Yellow card | Red card | Yellow card | Red card | Yellow card | Red card | Yellow card | Red card |
| 1 | (Kazakhstan) | GK | Aleksandr Zarutskiy | 1 | 0 | 0 | 0 | 0 | 0 | 0 | 0 | 1 | 0 |
| 5 | (Kazakhstan) | DF | Bagdat Kairov | 4 | 0 | 0 | 0 | 0 | 0 | 0 | 0 | 4 | 0 |
| 7 | (Bulgaria) | FW | Aleksandar Kolev | 2 | 1 | 0 | 0 | 0 | 0 | 1 | 0 | 3 | 1 |
| 8 | (Kazakhstan) | MF | Askhat Tagybergen | 4 | 1 | 0 | 0 | 0 | 0 | 1 | 0 | 5 | 1 |
| 9 | (Georgia (country)) | FW | Elguja Lobjanidze | 2 | 0 | 0 | 0 | 0 | 0 | 0 | 0 | 2 | 0 |
| 10 | (Kazakhstan) | MF | Duman Narzildaev | 8 | 0 | 0 | 0 | 0 | 0 | 0 | 0 | 8 | 0 |
| 11 | (Kazakhstan) | MF | Shokhan Abzalov | 2 | 0 | 0 | 0 | 0 | 0 | 0 | 0 | 2 | 0 |
| 13 | (Kazakhstan) | DF | Ilyas Amirseitov | 6 | 1 | 0 | 0 | 0 | 0 | 0 | 0 | 6 | 1 |
| 14 | (Kazakhstan) | DF | Mark Gorman | 3 | 0 | 0 | 0 | 0 | 0 | 0 | 0 | 3 | 0 |
| 15 | (Kazakhstan) | FW | Elzhas Altynbekov | 2 | 0 | 0 | 0 | 0 | 0 | 0 | 0 | 2 | 0 |
| 19 | (Cameroon) | MF | Clarence Bitang | 7 | 0 | 0 | 0 | 1 | 0 | 1 | 0 | 9 | 0 |
| 22 | (Kazakhstan) | DF | Aleksandr Marochkin | 2 | 0 | 0 | 0 | 0 | 0 | 1 | 0 | 3 | 0 |
| 39 | (Serbia) | MF | Aleksandar Stanisavljević | 5 | 0 | 0 | 0 | 0 | 0 | 0 | 0 | 5 | 0 |
| 55 | (Croatia) | DF | Ivan Graf | 6 | 0 | 0 | 0 | 1 | 0 | 0 | 0 | 7 | 0 |
| 61 | (Kazakhstan) | DF | Dinmukhamed Kashken | 1 | 0 | 0 | 0 | 0 | 0 | 0 | 0 | 1 | 0 |
| 94 | (Cape Verde) | MF | Alvin Fortes | 2 | 0 | 0 | 0 | 0 | 0 | 0 | 0 | 2 | 0 |
| 96 | (Kazakhstan) | MF | Maxim Fedin | 3 | 0 | 0 | 0 | 0 | 0 | 0 | 0 | 3 | 0 |
| 99 | (Mozambique) | FW | Reginaldo | 3 | 0 | 0 | 0 | 0 | 0 | 0 | 0 | 3 | 0 |
Players who left Kaisar during the season:
| 92 | (Croatia) | MF | Ivan Pešić | 1 | 0 | 0 | 0 | 0 | 0 | 0 | 0 | 1 | 0 |
| | | | TOTALS | 64 | 3 | 0 | 0 | 2 | 0 | 4 | 0 | 70 | 3 |
