= 2018 FC Tobol season =

FC Tobol
2018 season
- Chairman: Nikolay Panin
- Manager: Vladimir Nikitenko until 1 August 2018; Andrei Miroshnichenko (Caretaker); 1-6 August 2018; Marek Zub from 6 August 2018
- Stadium: Central Stadium
- Kazakhstan Premier League: 3rd
- Kazakhstan Cup: Quarterfinal vs Atyrau
- Europa League: Second Qualifying Round vs Pyunik
- Top goalscorer: League: Azat Nurgaliev (8); All: Azat Nurgaliev (9)
Home colours	Away colours

The 2018 FC Tobol season is the 20th successive season that the club playing in the Kazakhstan Premier League, the highest tier of association football in Kazakhstan. Tobol will also play in the Kazakhstan Cup. After finishing the previous season in third position, Ordabasy would have qualified for the Europa League first qualifying round but they failed to obtain a UEFA licence, meaning that Tobol qualified in their place.

== Season events ==
Prior to the start of the season, Vladimir Nikitenko was appointed as the club's manager following the expiration of Robert Yevdokimov's contract. On 1 August, Vladimir Nikitenko resigned as manager after Tobol were eliminated from the Europa League. Andrei Miroshnichenko was appointed as Caretaker manager before Marek Zub was announced as Tobol's new manager on 6 August 2018.

== Squad ==
As of 1 August 2018

Note: Flags indicate national team as defined under FIFA eligibility rules; some limited exceptions apply. Players may hold more than one non-FIFA nationality.

No.	Pos.	Nation	Player
1	GK	KAZ	Sultan Busurmanov
4	DF	CAF	Fernander Kassaï
5	DF	ROU	Ionuț Larie
7	DF	KAZ	Dmitri Miroshnichenko
8	DF	KAZ	Viktor Dmitrenko
9	MF	KAZ	Nurbol Zhumaskaliyev
10	MF	GEO	Nika Kvekveskiri
11	MF	KAZ	Aslan Darabayev
12	GK	UKR	Dmytro Nepohodov
13	MF	KAZ	Azat Nurgaliev
14	MF	KAZ	Samat Zharynbetov
15	FW	KAZ	Bauyrzhan Turysbek

No.	Pos.	Nation	Player
18	DF	KAZ	Timur Zhakupov
19	DF	KAZ	Grigori Sartakov
20	MF	GEO	Jaba Kankava
21	DF	KAZ	Sultan Abilgazy
33	GK	KAZ	Vyacheslav Kotlyar
44	MF	LTU	Artūras Žulpa
71	FW	KAZ	Dmitry Zagvostkin
79	FW	KAZ	Tanat Nusserbayev (loan from Ordabasy)
92	DF	KAZ	Marat Bystrov (on loan from Astana)
96	MF	KAZ	Maxim Fedin
99	FW	ARG	Juan Lescano (on loan from Anzhi Makhachkala)

== Transfers ==
=== In ===
Date	Position	Nationality	Name	From	Fee	Ref.
25 December 2018	MF	(Kazakhstan)	Aslan Darabayev	Irtysh Pavlodar	Undisclosed	
25 December 2018	MF	(Georgia (country))	Jaba Kankava		Free	
25 December 2018	DF	(Kazakhstan)	Sultan Abilgazy	Okzhetpes	Undisclosed	
25 December 2018	MF	(Kazakhstan)	Maxim Fedin	Okzhetpes	Undisclosed	
11 January 2018	MF	(Kazakhstan)	Bauyrzhan Turysbek	Kairat	Undisclosed	
17 January 2018	MF	(Kazakhstan)	Azat Nurgaliev	Ordabasy	Undisclosed	
7 February 2018	DF	(Ukraine)	Vasyl Kobin	Veres Rivne	Undisclosed	
10 March 2018	FW	(Ukraine)	Anton Shynder		Free	
	DF	(Romania)	Ionuț Larie	Steaua București	Undisclosed	
	GK	(Kazakhstan)	Vyacheslav Kotlyar	Akzhayik	Undisclosed	

=== Out ===
Date	Position	Nationality	Name	To	Fee	Ref.
31 January 2018	DF	(Kazakhstan)	Mark Gorman	Kaisar	Undisclosed	
	GK	(Kazakhstan)	Stanislav Pavlov	Astana	Undisclosed	
	MF	(Kazakhstan)	Almir Mukhutdinov	Zhetysu	Undisclosed	
	MF	(Kyrgyzstan)	Raul Jalilov	Zhetysu	Undisclosed	
	FW	(Bosnia and Herzegovina)	Amer Bekić	Sloboda Tuzla	Undisclosed	

=== Loans in ===
Date from	Position	Nationality	Name	From	Date to	Ref.
28 March 2018	FW	(Kazakhstan)	Tanat Nusserbayev	Ordabasy	End of Season	
4 July 2018	DF	(Kazakhstan)	Marat Bystrov	Astana	End of Season	
17 July 2018	FW	(Argentina)	Juan Lescano	Anzhi Makhachkala	30 June 2019	

=== Loans out ===
Date from	Position	Nationality	Name	To	Date to	Ref.
10 March 2018	MF	(Czech Republic)	Egon Vůch	Shakhter Karagandy	End of Season	

=== Released ===
Date	Position	Nationality	Name	Joined	Date	Ref.
8 June 2018	FW	(Ukraine)	Anton Shynder	Kisvárda	9 June 2018	
30 June 2018	DF	(Ukraine)	Vasyl Kobin	Mynai		
9 July 2018	DF	(North Macedonia)	Vanče Šikov	Akademija Pandev		
16 July 2018	FW	(Kazakhstan)	Zhasulan Moldakaraev	Ordabasy		
	MF	(Kazakhstan)	Yevgeniy Levin			
	FW	(Kazakhstan)	Temirlan Elmurzaev			
27 December 2019	MF	(Kazakhstan)	Nurbol Zhumaskaliyev	Retired		
31 December 2019	GK	(Kazakhstan)	Dmytro Nepohodov	Ordabasy	14 January 2019	
31 December 2019	GK	(Kazakhstan)	Vyacheslav Kotlyar			
31 December 2019	DF	(Kazakhstan)	Timur Zhakupov			
31 December 2019	MF	(Kazakhstan)	Aslan Darabayev	Irtysh Pavlodar	1 January 2019	
31 December 2019	FW	(Kazakhstan)	Dmitry Zagvostkin			

== Competitions ==
=== Premier League ===
==== Results summary ====
Overall								Home						Away					
Pld	W	D	L	GF	GA	GD	Pts	W	D	L	GF	GA	GD	W	D	L	GF	GA	GD
33	15	8	10	36	31	+5	53	6	6	5	18	17	+1	9	2	5	18	14	+4

Last updated: 11 November 2018.
Source: See Results

==== Results by round ====
Round	1	2	3	4	5	6	7	8	9	10	11	12	13	14	15	16	17	18	19	20	21	22	23	24	25	26	27	28	29	30	31	32	33
Ground	A	H	A	H	A	H	A	H	A	H	A	A	A	A	H	A	H	A	H	A	H	H	A	H	H	A	A	H	H	A	H	A	H
Result	W	L	W	W	W	D	L	L	W	W	W	W	L	W	L	W	D	D	D	L	D	W	L	D	D	L	W	W	L	D	W	L	W
Position	6	7	5	4	2	3	3	5	4	3	3	3	3	3	3	3	3	3	3	3	3	3	3	3	3	3	3	3	3	3	3	3	3

Source: See Results
A = Away; H = Home; W = Win; D = Draw; L = Loss

==== Results ====
11 March 2018 1	Zhetysu	0 – 1	Tobol	Taldykorgan
15:00 (UTC+6)	R.Nurmugamet (yellow card) 79'	Report	Turysbek 38'; Kankava (yellow card) 50'; Moldakaraev (yellow card) 56'; Kvekveskiri (yellow card) 63'	Stadium: Zhetysu Stadium; Attendance: 1,000; Referee: Marat Iskakov

17 March 2018 2	Tobol	0 – 1	Shakhter Karagandy	Kostanay
15:00 (UTC+6)		Report	Shakhmetov (yellow card) 49'; Y.Tarasov 57'; Omirtayev (yellow card) 90+3'; I.Shatsky (yellow card) 90+4'	Stadium: Stadion Zatobolets; Attendance: 2,500; Referee: Daniyar Sakhi

1 April 2018 3	Kyzylzhar	1 – 2	Tobol	Petropavl
15:00 (UTC+6)	T.Muldinov 23'; Gogua (yellow card) 90+1'	Report	Darabayev (yellow card) 27'; Nusserbayev 53'; Fedin 79' (yellow card) 90+4'	Stadium: Karasay Stadium; Attendance: 6,000; Referee: Saken Bayimbet

7 April 2018 4	Tobol	3 – 2	Atyrau	Kostanay
15:00 (UTC+6)	Shynder 22', 64'; Kankava 68'; Fedin (yellow card) 71'	Report	Barbarić (yellow card) 11'; Khairullin (yellow card) 13' (goal) 27'; Nane 40'; Loginovsky (yellow card) 69'	Stadium: Stadion Zatobolets; Attendance: 3,000; Referee: Furkhat Atazhanov

14 April 2018 5	Aktobe	0 – 1	Tobol	Shymkent
17:00 (UTC+6)	Simčević (yellow card) 55'; A.Kakimov (yellow card) 78'	Report	Shynder 6'; Fedin (yellow card) 32'	Stadium: Kazhymukan Munaitpasov Stadium; Attendance: 900; Referee: Denis Izmailov

22 April 2018 6	Tobol	1 – 1	Akzhayik	Kostanay
15:00 (UTC+6)	Nurgaliev (yellow card) 67'; Nusserbayev 70'; Kankava (yellow card) 71'	Report	Eseola 12'; Nurgaliyev (yellow card) 25' (yellow-red card) 33'; A.Ersalimov (yellow card) 56'	Stadium: Zatobolets Stadion; Attendance: 2,000; Referee: Timur Kumashev

29 April 2018 7	Astana	1 – 0	Tobol	Astana
17:00 (UTC+6)	Zaynutdinov (yellow card) 37'; Twumasi 67' (pen.)	Report	Kassaï (yellow card) 34'; Nurgaliev (yellow card) 41'; Dmitrenko (yellow card) 61'; Nusserbayev (yellow card) 66'	Stadium: Astana Arena; Attendance: 4,000; Referee: Bolat Saryev

5 May 2018 8	Tobol	0 – 3	Kaisar	Kostanay
18:00 (UTC+6)	Šikov (yellow card) 34'; Darabayev (yellow card) 90+1'	Report	I.Amirseitov (yellow card) 9'; Zhangylyshbay (yellow card) 21' (goal) 37'; Narzildaev 47'; Coureur 82'	Stadium: Central Stadium; Attendance: 5,000; Referee: Bakhyt Kyzylbaev

9 May 2018 9	Irtysh Pavlodar	0 – 1	Tobol	Pavlodar
17:00 (UTC+6)	D.Shmidt (yellow card) 32'; Kislitsyn (yellow card) 67'; Kislyak (yellow card) 79'; Salami (yellow card) 81'	Report	Kassaï (yellow card) 42'; Šikov (yellow card) 64'; Turysbek 90+6'	Stadium: Central Stadium; Attendance: 3,000; Referee: Denis Izmailov

13 May 2018 10	Tobol	1 – 0	Kairat	Kostanay
17:00 (UTC+6)	Kankava (yellow card) 25'; Nusserbayev (yellow card) 45' (goal) 89'; Nepohodov (yellow card) 90+3'	Report	Abiken (yellow card) 90'	Stadium: Central Stadium; Attendance: 5,500; Referee: Igor Chesnokov

19 May 2018 11	Ordabasy	0 – 1	Tobol	Shymkent
18:00 (UTC+6)	Kovalchuk (yellow card) 41'; Dosmagambetov (yellow card) 58'	Report	Turysbek 20'; Darabayev (yellow card) 44'; Kankava (yellow card) 48'; Žulpa (yellow card) 55'; Miroshnichenko (yellow card) 58'; Kassaï (yellow card) 86'; Moldakaraev (yellow card) 90+5'	Stadium: Kazhymukan Munaitpasov Stadium; Attendance: 3,500; Referee: Aleksandr Gauzer

27 May 2018 12	Shakhter Karagandy	0 – 1	Tobol	Temirtaw
17:00 (UTC+6)		Report	Dmitrenko (yellow card) 37'; Miroshnichenko 55'; Abilgazy (yellow card) 85'	Stadium: Metallurg Stadium; Attendance: 1,000; Referee: Marat Iskakov

31 May 2013 13	Tobol	0 – 1	Kyzylzhar	Kostanay
19:00 (UTC+6)	Turysbek (yellow card) 45'	Report	Punoševac 42'; I.Aitov (yellow card) 45+2'; T.Muldinov (yellow card) 82'; Tsirin (yellow card) 90+4'	Stadium: Central Stadium; Attendance: 4,000; Referee: Aydin Rakhimbayev

17 June 2018 14	Atyrau	0 – 2	Tobol	Atyrau
19:00 (UTC+6)	A.Saparov (yellow card) 5' (yellow-red card) 87'; R.Esatov (yellow card) 90'	Report	Nurgaliev 64', 85'; Šikov (yellow card) 90+1'	Stadium: Tomarly Stadion; Attendance: 1,000; Referee: Bakhyt Kyzylbaev

23 June 2018 15	Tobol	2 – 3	Aktobe	Kostanay
18:00 (UTC+6)	Kankava (yellow card) 17'; Šikov (yellow card) 42'; Turysbek (yellow card) 55'; Nurgaliev (yellow card) 63' (goal) 76' (pen.), 85' (pen.); Miroshnichenko (red card) 81'	Report	Pizzelli 42', 60', 82' (pen.) (yellow card) 44'; Marjanović (yellow card) 65'	Stadium: Central Stadium; Attendance: 2,500; Referee: Igor Aleshin

1 July 2018 16	Akzhayik	1 – 3	Tobol	Oral
18:00 (UTC+6)	R.Khairov (yellow card) 29'; M.Sapanov 90+4'	Report	S.Zharynbetov (yellow card) 8'; Nusserbayev 56', 63'; Kankava 88'	Stadium: Petr Atoyan Stadium; Attendance: 1,000; Referee: Igor Chesnokov

5 July 2018 17	Tobol	0 – 0	Astana	Kostanay
18:00 (UTC+6)	Nusserbayev (yellow card) 45'; Turysbek (yellow card) 59'	Report	Muzhikov (yellow card) 16'; Aničić (yellow card) 19'; Kleinheisler (yellow card) 89'	Stadium: Central Stadium; Attendance: 2,500; Referee: Daniyar Sakhi

14 July 2018 18	Kaisar	2 – 2	Tobol	Kyzylorda
19:00 (UTC+6)	Tagybergen (yellow card) 27' (goal) 90+4'; Djédjé 89'; Graf (yellow card) 90+2'	Report	Kassaï (yellow card) 22'; Nurgaliev 27', 68' (yellow card) 65' (yellow-red card) 84'; Moldakaraev (yellow card) 42'; S.Zharynbetov (yellow card) 50'; S.Busurmanov (red card) 90'	Stadium: Gani Muratbayev Stadium; Attendance: 2,000; Referee: Furkat Atajanov

22 July 2018 19	Tobol	1 – 1	Irtysh Pavlodar	Kostanay
19:00 (UTC+6)	Dmitrenko (yellow card) 61'; S.Zharynbetov 63'	Report	Kislitsyn (yellow card) 33'; Popadiuc (yellow card) 60' (goal) 74'; Adri (yellow card) 65'; Shestakov (yellow card) 83'; A.Popov (yellow card) 87'	Stadium: Central Stadium; Attendance: 4,000; Referee: Timur Kumashev

29 July 2018 20	Kairat	1 – 0	Tobol	Almaty
19:00 (UTC+6)	Bateau (yellow card) 44'; Isael 69'	Report	S.Zharynbetov (yellow card) 15'; Abilgazy (yellow card) 28'; T.Zhakupov (yellow card) 51'	Stadium: Central Stadium; Attendance: 3,000; Referee: Grigory Moskovchenko

5 August 2018 21	Tobol	1 – 1	Ordabasy	Kostanay
19:00 (UTC+6)	Kankava (yellow card) 8'; Darabayev 54'	Report	D.Dautov (yellow card) 60'; Fontanello (yellow card) 62'; Kojić 64'; Moldakaraev (yellow card) 73'; M.Tolebek (yellow card) 83'	Stadium: Central Stadium; Attendance: 3,000; Referee: Bolat Karlibayev

11 August 2018 22	Tobol	1 – 0	Zhetysu	Kostanay
19:00 (UTC+6)	Kassaï (yellow card) 49'; Darabayev (yellow card) 56' (goal) 58'; Larie (yellow card) 62'; Nurgaliev (yellow card) 77'	Report	Kharabara (yellow card) 41'	Stadium: Central Stadium; Attendance: 3,000; Referee: Furkat Atajanov

18 August 2018 23	Atyrau	2 – 1	Tobol	Atyrau
20:00 (UTC+6)	Khairullin (yellow card) 45+2' (goal) 51'; Sikimić (yellow card) 48'; K.Kalmuratov (yellow card) 55'; Obšivač (yellow card) 66' (goal) 85'; Sergienko (yellow card) 90+2'	Report	S.Zharynbetov (yellow card) 28'; Miroshnichenko (yellow card) 38'; Nusserbayev (yellow card) 39' (yellow-red card) 90+2'; Bystrov 75'; Dmitrenko (yellow card) 90+2'	Stadium: Munaishy Stadium; Attendance: 3,500; Referee: Sergey Gorokhovodatskiy

25 August 2018 24	Tobol	0 – 0	Kaisar	Kostanay
19:00 (UTC+6)	Abilgazy (yellow card) 67'	Report	Punoševac (yellow card) 23'; Marochkin (yellow card) 25'; Kamara (yellow card) 57'	Stadium: Central Stadium; Attendance: 1,500; Referee: Aydin Rakhimbayev

16 September 2018 26	Tobol	2 – 2	Zhetysu	Kostanay
18:00 (UTC+6)	Kvekveskiri 32'; Nurgaliev 35'; Darabayev (yellow card) 62'; Larie (yellow card) 79'	Report	Stepanyuk 22'; Sadownichy (yellow card) 49'; R.Jalilov (yellow card) 58'; Mawutor (yellow card) 78'; Djeparov 80' (pen.)	Stadium: Central Stadium; Attendance: 3,000; Referee: Ruslan Omarov

22 September 2018 27	Aktobe	3 – 1	Tobol	Aktobe
20:00 (UTC+6)	Radin (yellow card) 45'; Pizzelli 60', 90+3'; Marjanović 79'	Report	Kankava (yellow card) 30'; Turysbek 50'; Miroshnichenko (yellow card) 81'	Stadium: Central Stadium; Attendance: 8,000; Referee: Denis Izmailov

26 September 2018 25	Akzhayik	0 – 1	Tobol	Oral
18:00 (UTC+6)	Chachua (yellow card) 57'	Report	Dmitrenko (yellow card) 26'; Kankava 81'; S.Zharynbetov (yellow card) 88'	Stadium: Petr Atoyan Stadium; Attendance: 800; Referee: Daniyar Sakhi

30 September 2018 28	Tobol	1 – 0	Ordabasy	Kostanay
18:00 (UTC+6)	Nusserbayev 69'; Nepohodov (yellow card) 83'	Report	Diakate (yellow card) 22'; M.Tolebek (yellow card) 90+5'	Stadium: Central Stadium; Attendance: 4,200; Referee: Grigory Moskovchenko

6 October 2018 29	Tobol	1 – 2	Irtysh Pavlodar	Kostanay
17:00 (UTC+6)	Žulpa (yellow card) 39'; Nusserbayev 72'; Miroshnichenko (yellow card) 75'; Bystrov (yellow card) 88'	Report	Popadiuc 70'; Stamenković 89' (pen.)	Stadium: Central Stadium; Attendance: 3,000; Referee: Zhandos Abzhan

21 October 2018 30	Kairat	0 – 0	Tobol	Almaty
15:00 (UTC+6)	Akhmetov (yellow card) 54'; Zhukov (yellow card) 88'; Eseola (yellow card) 90+1'; Kuat (yellow card) 90+3'	Report	Žulpa (yellow card) 53'	Stadium: Central Stadium; Attendance: 3,500; Referee: Bolat Karlibayev

28 October 2018 31	Tobol	1 – 0	Astana	Kostanay
16:00 (UTC+6)	Fedin (yellow card) 40'; Nurgaliev 59' (yellow card) 79'	Report	Mayewski (yellow card) 42'; Muzhikov (yellow card) 76'	Stadium: Central Stadium; Attendance: 4,000; Referee: Saken Bayimbet

3 November 2018 32	Shakhter Karagandy	2 – 1	Tobol	Temirtau
15:00 (UTC+6)	G.Harutyunyan 37' (yellow card) 44'; Kojašević 76'	Report	Turysbek (yellow card) 43'; Dmitrenko 89'	Stadium: Metallurg Stadium; Attendance: 500; Referee: Bakhyt Kyzylbaev

11 November 2018 33	Tobol	3 – 0	Kyzylzhar	Kostanay
15:00 (UTC+6)	Kvekveskiri 1'; Fedin 56'; Zhumaskaliyev 83'	Report	A.Dzhanuzakov (yellow card) 14'; A.Shabaev (yellow card) 66'	Stadium: Central Stadium; Attendance: 6,000; Referee: Denis Izmailov

==== League table ====
Pos	Team	Pld	W	D	L	GF	GA	GD	Pts	Qualification or relegation
1	Astana (C)	33	24	5	4	66	22	+44	77	Qualification for the Champions League first qualifying round
2	Kairat	33	19	5	9	60	33	+27	62	Qualification for the Europa League first qualifying round (Note: Since the winners of 2018 Kazakhstan Cup, Kairat, qualified for European competition based on their league position, the spot awarded to the Cup winner (Europa League first qualifying round) was passed to the next best-placed team (the fourth-placed team).)
3	Tobol	33	15	8	10	36	30	+6	53	Qualification for the Europa League first qualifying round
4	Ordabasy	33	13	7	13	38	44	−6	46	Qualification for the Europa League first qualifying round
5	Kaisar	33	11	12	10	35	31	+4	45	

Source: UEFA, Soccerway
Rules for classification: 1) Points; 2) Goal difference; 3) Matches won; 4) Goals scored; 5) Away goals scored; 6) Head-to-head points; 7) Head-to-head matches won; 8) Head-to-head goal difference; 9) Head-to-head goals scored; 10) Head-to-head away goals scored; 11) Draw.
(C) Champions

=== Kazakhstan Cup ===
18 April 2018 Last 16	Tobol	1 – 0	Zhetysu	Kostanay
17:00 (UTC+6)	Darabayev (yellow card) 54'; Turysbek 65'; Kankava (yellow card) 90+2'	Report	Sadownichy (yellow card) 24'; Mawutor (yellow card) 50'	Stadium: Central Stadium; Attendance: 1,500; Referee: Bolat Saryev

23 May 2018 Quarterfinal	Atyrau	2 – 1	Tobol	Atyrau
19:00 (UTC+6)	Zyankovich 7', 66'; R.Aslan (yellow card) 81'; D.Kayralliyev (yellow card) 88'	Report	Nusserbayev 56' Dmitrenko (yellow card) 90'	Stadium: Munaishy Stadium; Attendance: 800; Referee: Bagdat Abdullaev

=== UEFA Europa League ===
==== Qualifying rounds ====
10 July 2018 First qualifying round 1st leg	Samtredia (Georgia (country))	0 – 1	(Kazakhstan) Tobol	Tbilisi, Georgia
23:00 (UTC+6)		Report	Kvekveskiri (yellow card) 24'; Miroshnichenko (yellow card) 90'; Fedin 90+5'	Stadium: Mikheil Meskhi Stadium; Attendance: 778; Referee: Tim Marshall (Northern Ireland)
Note: Samtredia played their home matches at Mikheil Meskhi Stadium, Tbilisi, instead of their regular stadium Erosi Manjgaladze Stadium, Samtredia.

19 July 2018 First qualifying round 2nd leg	Tobol (Kazakhstan)	2 – 0 (3 – 0 agg.)	(Georgia (country)) Samtredia	Kostanay, Kazakhstan
19:00 (UTC+6)	Turysbek 12'; Bystrov (yellow card) 65'; Darabayev 83'	Report	V.Bachiashvili (yellow card) 39'; Z.Khabeishvili (yellow card) 81'	Stadium: Central Stadium; Attendance: 8,012; Referee: Tihomir Pejin (Croatia)

26 July 2018 Second qualifying round 1st leg	Tobol (Kazakhstan)	2 – 1	(Armenia) Pyunik	Kostanay, Kazakhstan
21:00 (UTC+6)	Fedin 49'; Nurgaliev 80'	Report	V.Hayrapetyan (yellow card) 20'; Koryan 90'	Stadium: Central Stadium; Referee: Juri Frischer (Estonia)

31 July 2018 Second qualifying round 2nd leg	Pyunik (Armenia)	1 – 0 ((a) 2 – 2 agg.)	(Kazakhstan) Tobol	Yerevan, Armenia
22:00 (UTC+6)	Trusevych (yellow card) 24'; Avetisyan (yellow card) 66' (yellow-red card) 89'; Konaté 82' (yellow card) 90+1'	Report	Nurgaliev (yellow card) 39'; Žulpa (yellow card) 50'; Nusserbayev (yellow card) 90'	Stadium: Vazgen Sargsyan Republican Stadium; Referee: Petr Ardeleanu (Czech Republic)
Note: Pyunik played their home matches at Vazgen Sargsyan Republican Stadium, Yerevan, instead of their regular stadium Pyunik Stadium, Yerevan

== Squad statistics ==
As of Match played 11 November 2018

=== Appearances and goals ===
No.	Pos	Nat	Player	Total		Premier League		Kazakhstan Cup		UEFA Europa League	
No.	Pos	Nat	Player	Apps	Goals	Apps	Goals	Apps	Goals	Apps	Goals
1	GK	(Kazakhstan) KAZ	Sultan Busurmanov	3	0	3	0	0	0	0	0
4	DF	(Central African Republic) CAF	Fernander Kassaï	35	0	28+1	0	2	0	4	0
5	DF	(Romania) ROU	Ionuț Larie	12	0	11+1	0	0	0	0	0
7	DF	(Kazakhstan) KAZ	Dmitri Miroshnichenko	36	1	28+2	1	2	0	4	0
8	DF	(Kazakhstan) KAZ	Viktor Dmitrenko	35	1	29	1	2	0	4	0
9	FW	(Kazakhstan) KAZ	Nurbol Zhumaskaliyev	10	1	1+9	1	0	0	0	0
10	MF	(Georgia (country)) GEO	Nika Kvekveskiri	28	2	15+8	2	0+1	0	4	0
11	MF	(Kazakhstan) KAZ	Aslan Darabayev	30	3	21+5	2	2	0	0+2	1
12	GK	(Ukraine) UKR	Dmytro Nepohodov	34	0	27+1	0	2	0	4	0
13	MF	(Kazakhstan) KAZ	Azat Nurgaliev	32	9	28	8	0	0	4	1
14	MF	(Kazakhstan) KAZ	Samat Zharynbetov	17	1	8+6	1	0	0	0+3	0
15	FW	(Kazakhstan) KAZ	Bauyrzhan Turysbek	36	6	24+6	4	2	1	2+2	1
18	DF	(Kazakhstan) KAZ	Timur Zhakupov	5	0	1+4	0	0	0	0	0
19	DF	(Kazakhstan) KAZ	Grigori Sartakov	3	0	2+1	0	0	0	0	0
20	MF	(Georgia (country)) GEO	Jaba Kankava	34	3	27+1	3	1+1	0	4	0
21	DF	(Kazakhstan) KAZ	Sultan Abilgazy	8	0	5+3	0	0	0	0	0
33	GK	(Kazakhstan) KAZ	Vyacheslav Kotlyar	3	0	3	0	0	0	0	0
37	DF	(Kazakhstan) KAZ	Aleksandr Zhukov	2	0	1+1	0	0	0	0	0
44	MF	(Lithuania) LTU	Artūras Žulpa	37	0	30+1	0	2	0	4	0
51	FW	(Kazakhstan) KAZ	Temirlan Amirgazy	1	0	1	0	0	0	0	0
79	FW	(Kazakhstan) KAZ	Tanat Nusserbayev	30	8	7+18	7	0+1	1	2+2	0
92	DF	(Kazakhstan) KAZ	Marat Bystrov	17	1	8+6	1	0	0	3	0
96	MF	(Kazakhstan) KAZ	Maxim Fedin	34	4	25+3	2	2	0	4	2
99	FW	(Argentina) ARG	Juan Lescano	11	0	7+2	0	0	0	1+1	0
Players away from Tobol on loan:
Players who left Tobol during the season:
6	DF	(North Macedonia) MKD	Vanče Šikov	13	0	11	0	2	0	0	0
17	FW	(Kazakhstan) KAZ	Zhasulan Moldakaraev	15	0	3+9	0	2	0	0+1	0
25	FW	(Ukraine) UKR	Anton Shynder	7	3	5+1	3	0+1	0	0	0
77	DF	(Ukraine) UKR	Vasyl Kobin	9	0	4+4	0	1	0	0	0

=== Goal scorers ===
Place	Position	Nation	Number	Name	Premier League	Kazakhstan Cup	UEFA Europa League	Total
1	MF	(Kazakhstan)	13	Azat Nurgaliev	8	0	1	9
2	FW	(Kazakhstan)	79	Tanat Nusserbayev	7	1	0	8
3	FW	(Kazakhstan)	15	Bauyrzhan Turysbek	4	1	1	6
4	MF	(Kazakhstan)	96	Maxim Fedin	2	0	2	4
5	FW	(Ukraine)	25	Anton Shynder	3	0	0	3
5	MF	(Georgia (country))	20	Jaba Kankava	3	0	0	3
5	MF	(Kazakhstan)	11	Aslan Darabayev	2	0	1	3
8	MF	(Georgia (country))	10	Nika Kvekveskiri	2	0	0	2
9	DF	(Kazakhstan)	7	Dmitri Miroshnichenko	1	0	0	1
9	MF	(Kazakhstan)	14	Samat Zharynbetov	1	0	0	1
9	DF	(Kazakhstan)	92	Marat Bystrov	1	0	0	1
9	DF	(Kazakhstan)	8	Viktor Dmitrenko	1	0	0	1
9	FW	(Kazakhstan)	9	Nurbol Zhumaskaliyev	1	0	0	1
				TOTALS	33	2	5	40

=== Disciplinary record ===
Number	Nation	Position	Name	Premier League		Kazakhstan Cup		UEFA Europa League		Total	
Number	Nation	Position	Name	Yellow card	Red card	Yellow card	Red card	Yellow card	Red card	Yellow card	Red card
1	(Kazakhstan)	GK	Sultan Busurmanov	0	1	0	0	0	0	0	1
4	(Central African Republic)	DF	Fernander Kassaï	5	0	0	0	0	0	5	0
5	(Romania)	DF	Ionuț Larie	2	0	0	0	0	0	2	0
7	(Kazakhstan)	DF	Dmitri Miroshnichenko	4	1	0	0	1	0	5	1
8	(Kazakhstan)	DF	Viktor Dmitrenko	5	0	1	0	0	0	6	0
10	(Georgia (country))	MF	Nika Kvekveskiri	1	0	0	0	1	0	2	0
11	(Kazakhstan)	MF	Aslan Darabayev	5	0	1	0	0	0	6	0
12	(Ukraine)	GK	Dmytro Nepohodov	2	0	0	0	0	0	2	0
13	(Kazakhstan)	MF	Azat Nurgaliev	6	1	0	0	1	0	7	1
14	(Kazakhstan)	MF	Samat Zharynbetov	5	0	0	0	0	0	5	0
15	(Kazakhstan)	FW	Bauyrzhan Turysbek	4	0	0	0	0	0	4	0
18	(Kazakhstan)	DF	Timur Zhakupov	1	0	0	0	0	0	1	0
20	(Georgia (country))	MF	Jaba Kankava	7	0	1	0	0	0	8	0
21	(Kazakhstan)	DF	Sultan Abilgazy	3	0	0	0	0	0	3	0
44	(Lithuania)	MF	Artūras Žulpa	3	0	0	0	1	0	4	0
79	(Kazakhstan)	FW	Tanat Nusserbayev	6	1	0	0	1	0	7	1
92	(Kazakhstan)	DF	Marat Bystrov	1	0	0	0	1	0	2	0
96	(Kazakhstan)	MF	Maxim Fedin	4	0	0	0	0	0	4	0
Players who left Tobol during the season:
6	(North Macedonia)	DF	Vanče Šikov	4	0	0	0	0	0	4	0
17	(Kazakhstan)	FW	Zhasulan Moldakaraev	3	0	0	0	0	0	3	0
			TOTALS	71	4	3	0	7	0	81	4
