= 2015 FC Irtysh Pavlodar season =

Irtysh
2015 season
- Chairman: Roman Skljar
- Manager: Dmitri Cheryshev (until 8 May); Sergey Klimov (caretaker) (8 May – 1 June); Dimitar Dimitrov (from 1 June)
- Stadium: Munaishy Stadium
- Kazakhstan Premier League: 6th
- Kazakhstan Cup: Second round vs Kairat
- Top goalscorer: League: Kostyantyn Dudchenko (8); All: Kostyantyn Dudchenko (8)
Home colours	Away colours

The 2015 FC Irtysh Pavlodar season is the 24th successive season that the club will play in the Kazakhstan Premier League, the highest tier of association football in Kazakhstan. Irtysh will also participate in the Kazakhstan Cup.

== Season events ==
On 8 May, following the club's fifth defeat of the season, manager Dmitri Cheryshev was sacked and Sergey Klimov appointed as caretaker manager. Dimitar Dimitrov was appointed as the club's permanent manager on 1 June.

== Squad ==
As of end of season

Note: Flags indicate national team as defined under FIFA eligibility rules; some limited exceptions apply. Players may hold more than one non-FIFA nationality.

No.	Pos.	Nation	Player
1	GK	KAZ	David Loria
2	DF	KAZ	Vladimir Sedelnikov
3	DF	KAZ	Vladislav Chernyshov
4	DF	KAZ	Aleksandr Kislitsyn
5	DF	KAZ	Piraliy Aliev
8	MF	KAZ	Samat Smakov
9	FW	KAZ	Kuanysh Begalyn
11	FW	KAZ	Yerkebulan Nurgaliyev
14	MF	KAZ	Azat Ersalimov
17	MF	KAZ	Abylaykhan Totay
19	DF	KAZ	Grigori Sartakov
20	MF	CZE	Tomáš Jirsák
21	GK	KAZ	Nikita Kalmykov

No.	Pos.	Nation	Player
23	DF	KAZ	Zakhar Korobov
25	DF	KAZ	Ruslan Yesimov
30	FW	UKR	Kostyantyn Dudchenko
32	GK	KAZ	Denis Tolebayev
33	MF	KAZ	Kazbek Geteriev
40	MF	POR	Carlos Fonseca (loan from Slavia Sofia)
50	DF	CAF	Fernander Kassaï (loan from Slavia Sofia)
60	FW	BRA	Evandro Roncatto
80	MF	FRA	Alassane N'Diaye
90	DF	BRA	Antonio Ferreira
95	MF	KAZ	Vladimir Vomenko
—	DF	KAZ	Berik Shaikhov

=== Out on loan ===
Note: Flags indicate national team as defined under FIFA eligibility rules; some limited exceptions apply. Players may hold more than one non-FIFA nationality.

No.	Pos.	Nation	Player
13	MF	KAZ	Alibek Ayaganov (at Spartak Semey)

== Transfers ==
=== Winter ===
In: Note: Flags indicate national team as defined under FIFA eligibility rules; some limited exceptions apply. Players may hold more than one non-FIFA nationality.

No.	Pos.	Nation	Player
1	GK	KAZ	David Loria (from (Turkey) Karşıyaka)
2	DF	KAZ	Vladimir Sedelnikov (from (Kazakhstan) Kairat)
4	DF	KAZ	Aleksandr Kislitsyn (from (Kazakhstan) Kairat)
5	DF	KAZ	Piraliy Aliev (from (Kazakhstan) Ordabasy)
7	MF	RUS	Alan Gatagov (from (Russia) Dynamo Moscow)
8	DF	KAZ	Samat Smakov (from (Kazakhstan) Kairat)
10	MF	KAZ	Alisher Suley (from (Kazakhstan) Tobol)
11	FW	KAZ	Yerkebulan Nurgaliyev (from (Kazakhstan) Spartak Semey)
14	MF	KAZ	Azat Ersalimov (from (Kazakhstan) Spartak Semey)
15	FW	BFA	Aristide Bancé (from (Finland) HJK Helsinki)
22	DF	RUS	Artyom Samsonov (from (Russia) Khimik Dzerzhinsk)
25	DF	KAZ	Ruslan Yesimov (from)
27	MF	RUS	Sergei Ignatyev (loan from (Russia) Arsenal Tula)
32	GK	KAZ	Denis Tolebayev (from (Kazakhstan) Astana)
33	MF	KAZ	Kazbek Geteriev (from (Kazakhstan) Kaisar)
55	DF	CRO	Ivan Graf (from (Croatia) Istra 1961)
89	FW	NGR	Izu Azuka (from (Turkey) Gaziantep BB)

Out: Note: Flags indicate national team as defined under FIFA eligibility rules; some limited exceptions apply. Players may hold more than one non-FIFA nationality.

No.	Pos.	Nation	Player
4	DF	MNE	Miodrag Džudović
7	MF	TKM	Arslanmyrat Amanow (to (Uzbekistan) Olmaliq)
8	MF	KAZ	Evgeniy Averchenko (to (Kazakhstan) Taraz)
11	MF	KGZ	Sergei Ivanov (Retired)
14	MF	KAZ	Igor Yurin (to (Kazakhstan) Tobol)
17	FW	KAZ	Altynbek Dauletkhanov
18	DF	KAZ	Renat Bayanov
22	MF	KAZ	Aleksandr Andreev
25	DF	KAZ	Ihor Chuchman
26	MF	KAZ	Ruslan Akhmetdinov
27	MF	KAZ	Elvin Allayarov
33	GK	KAZ	Vyacheslav Kotlyar (to (Kazakhstan) Shakhter Karagandy)
39	DF	KAZ	Dmitriy Shevchenko
40	GK	KAZ	Mikhail Golubnichi (to (Kazakhstan) Astana)
44	DF	KAZ	Vassiliy Zhukov
50	MF	UKR	Rinar Valeyev (to (Ukraine) Illichivets Mariupol)
52	MF	KAZ	Rustem Kuanyshev
60	DF	BUL	Orlin Starokin (to (Bulgaria) Lokomotiv Sofia)
77	MF	RUS	Almir Mukhutdinov (to (Kazakhstan) Taraz)
98	MF	MNE	Igor Burzanović (to (China) Hunan Billows)

=== Summer ===
In: Note: Flags indicate national team as defined under FIFA eligibility rules; some limited exceptions apply. Players may hold more than one non-FIFA nationality.

No.	Pos.	Nation	Player
20	MF	CZE	Tomáš Jirsák (from (Bulgaria) Botev Plovdiv)
40	MF	POR	Carlos Fonseca (loan from (Bulgaria) Slavia Sofia)
50	DF	CAF	Fernander Kassaï (loan from (Bulgaria) Slavia Sofia)
80	MF	FRA	Alassane N'Diaye (from (Bulgaria) Beroe)
60	FW	BRA	Evandro Roncatto (from (Portugal) Oriental Lisboa)
70	FW	GAM	Toubabo (from (United Arab Emirates) Hatta Club)
90	DF	BRA	Antonio Ferreira (from (Brazil) Bragantino)
—	DF	KAZ	Berik Shaikhov (from (Kazakhstan) Astana)

Out: Note: Flags indicate national team as defined under FIFA eligibility rules; some limited exceptions apply. Players may hold more than one non-FIFA nationality.

No.	Pos.	Nation	Player
7	MF	RUS	Alan Gatagov (to (Kazakhstan) Taraz)
10	MF	KAZ	Alisher Suley (to (Kazakhstan) Taraz)
13	MF	KAZ	Alibek Ayaganov (loan to (Kazakhstan) Spartak Semey)
15	FW	BFA	Aristide Bancé (to (South Africa) Chippa United)
22	DF	RUS	Artyom Samsonov (to (Russia) Energomash Belgorod)
24	DF	MDA	Simeon Bulgaru (to (Moldova) Dacia Chișinău)
27	MF	RUS	Sergei Ignatyev (loan return to (Russia) Arsenal Tula)
55	DF	CRO	Ivan Graf
70	FW	GAM	Toubabo
89	FW	NGR	Izu Azuka (to (Kazakhstan) Taraz)

== Competitions ==
=== Kazakhstan Premier League ===
==== First round ====
===== Results summary =====
Overall								Home						Away					
Pld	W	D	L	GF	GA	GD	Pts	W	D	L	GF	GA	GD	W	D	L	GF	GA	GD
22	7	9	6	26	23	+3	30	6	2	3	17	12	+5	1	7	3	9	11	−2

Last updated: 28 July 2015.
Source: Soccerway

===== Results by round =====
Round	1	2	3	4	5	6	7	8	9	10	11	12	13	14	15	16	17	18	19	20	21	22
Ground	A	H	A	H	A	H	A	A	H	A	H	A	H	A	H	A	H	H	A	H	A	H
Result	D	L	D	D	D	W	L	D	L	L	L	D	W	L	W	W	D	W	D	W	D	W
Position	5	11	9	9	10	10	9	8	9	9	10	10	9	10	9	7	8	7	7	7	6	6

Source: Soccerway
A = Away; H = Home; W = Win; D = Draw; L = Loss

===== Results =====
7 March 2015 1	Ordabasy	1–1	Irtysh	Shymkent
15:00 (UTC+6)	Božić 12'; Ashirbekov (yellow card) 44'; Petrov (yellow card) 63'	Summary	Geteriev (yellow card) 34'; Gatagov 45'; Samsonov (yellow card) 69'; Chernyshov (yellow card) 73'; Azuka (yellow card) 88'; Nurgaliyev (yellow card) 90+4'	Stadium: Kazhimukan Munaitpasov Stadium; Attendance: 3,000; Referee: Marat Iskakov

11 March 2015 2	Irtysh	0–3	Astana	Pavlodar
15:00 (UTC+6)	Loria (yellow card) 49'; Geteriev (yellow card) 90'	Summary	Cañas 15' (pen.); Twumasi 49'; Maksimović 57'	Stadium: Central Stadium; Attendance: 3,000; Referee: Akmalkhan Kholmatov

15 March 2015 3	Kaisar	0–0	Irtysh	Kyzylorda
15:00 (UTC+6)	E. Altynbekov (yellow card) 38'; Dimov (yellow card) 60'; A. Baltaev (yellow card) 73'	Summary	Chernyshov (yellow card) 16' (yellow-red card) 76'; Sartakov (yellow card) 80'	Stadium: Gany Muratbayev Stadium; Attendance: 3,000; Referee: Aleksandr Gauzer

21 March 2015 4	Irtysh	1–1	Tobol	Pavlodar
15:00 (UTC+6)	Sartakov 2'; Gatagov (yellow card) 67'; Azuka (yellow card) 90+2'	Summary	Sadownichy (yellow card) 65'; Šimkovič (yellow card) 84'; Mošnikov 90+3'	Stadium: Central Stadium; Attendance: 2,500; Referee: Bolat Karlibayev

5 April 2015 5	Zhetysu	2–2	Irtysh	Taldykorgan
15:00 (UTC+6)	Despotović 58'; Savić 67'	Summary	Samsonov (yellow card) 9'; Aliev (yellow card) 36' (goal) 89'; Azuka 75'	Stadium: Zhetysu Stadium; Attendance: 3,500; Referee: Aleksandr Aliyev

11 April 2015 6	Irtysh	3–1	Okzhetpes	Pavlodar
15:00 (UTC+6)	Smakov 20'; Azuka 32'; Bancé (yellow card) 33' (goal) 51'; Kislitsyn (yellow card) 67'; Graf (yellow card) 78'	Summary	Volkov 6'	Stadium: Central Stadium; Attendance: 2,500; Referee: Timur Kumashev

8 April 2015 7	Kairat	1–0	Irtysh	Almaty
19:00 (UTC+6)	Gohou 24'; Riera (yellow card) 86'	Summary	R. Yesimov (yellow card) 40'; Graf (yellow card) 68'	Stadium: Central Stadium; Attendance: 6,800; Referee: Denis Tevyashov

20 April 2015 8	Shakhter Karagandy	2–2	Irtysh	Karaganda
16:00 (UTC+6)	Topčagić 18'; R. Murtazayev 33'; Pokrivač (yellow card) 44'; Karpovich (yellow card) 65'; Vošahlík (yellow card) 84'	Summary	Azuka 13'; David 23' (o.g.); Samsonov (yellow card) 31'; Kislitsyn (red card) 70'; Bancé (yellow card) 72'	Stadium: Shakhter Stadium; Attendance: 2,000; Referee: Anatoyli Vishnichenko

25 April 2015 9	Irtysh	1–2	Atyrau	Pavlodar
15:00 (UTC+6)	Smakov (yellow card) 15' (goal) 67'; Samsonov (yellow card) 54'	Summary	V. Kuzmin (yellow card) 31'; Chichulin (yellow card) 52'; Essame 57'; Tleshev 69' (pen.)	Stadium: Central Stadium; Attendance: 3,000; Referee: Artyom Kuchin

3 May 2015 10	Aktobe	2–1	Irtysh	Aktobe
17:00 (UTC+6)	Danilo (yellow card) 30'; Adeleye 53'; Logvinenko (yellow card) 67'; A. Tagybergen (yellow card) 77'; Mineiro (yellow card) 82'; Pizzelli 90+3' (pen.)	Summary	Bancé 34'; R. Yesimov (yellow card) 90'; Chernyshov (red card) 90+2'	Stadium: Central Stadium; Referee: Denis Izmailov

7 May 2015 11	Irtysh	0–1	Taraz	Pavlodar
17:00 (UTC+6)	A. Ersalimov (yellow card) 55'	Summary	O. Yarovenko 35'; Golić (yellow card) 55'	Stadium: Central Stadium; Attendance: 2,500; Referee: Akmalkhan Kholmatov

16 May 2015 12	Astana	2–2	Irtysh	Astana
17:00 (UTC+6)	Kéthévoama 4'; Nusserbayev 60'; Cañas (yellow card) 87'	Summary	Dudchenko 3'; Azuka (yellow card) 50'; Sartakov (yellow card) 85'; A. Ersalimov 90'; Aliev (yellow card) 90+4'	Stadium: Astana Arena; Attendance: 3,000; Referee: Bagdat Abdullaev

24 May 2015 13	Irtysh	4–2	Kaisar	Pavlodar
17:00 (UTC+6)	Dudchenko 25', 32', 62'; Kislitsyn 41'; Azuka (yellow card) 44'; Chernyshov (yellow card) 76'	Summary	Junuzović 49'; A. Baltaev (yellow card) 62'; Klein (yellow card) 66'; Hunt 90+2'	Stadium: Central Stadium; Attendance: 3,000; Referee: Aleksander Aliyev

29 May 2015 14	Tobol	1–0	Irtysh	Kostanay
18:00 (UTC+6)	Kalu 29' (pen.); I. Yurin (yellow card) 31'; R. Aslan (yellow card) 47'	Summary	Loria (yellow card) 28'; Aliev (red card) 31'; Gatagov (yellow card) 36'	Stadium: Central Stadium; Attendance: 4,500; Referee: Daniyar Sakhi

6 June 2015 15	Irtysh	1–0	Zhetysu	Pavlodar
15:00 (UTC+6)	Sartakov (yellow card) 32'; Geteriev (yellow card) 36'; Smakov (yellow card) 49'; Graf (yellow card) 78'; Kislitsyn (yellow card) 89'	Summary	Ergashev (yellow card) 58'	Stadium: Central Stadium; Attendance: 2,500; Referee: Aydin Rakhimbayev

20 June 2015 16	Okzhetpes	0–1	Irtysh	Kokshetau
18:00 (UTC+6)	Khokhlov (yellow card) 29'; I. Mangutkin (yellow card) 89'	Summary	Fonseca (yellow card) 30'; N'Diaye 57'; R. Yesimov (yellow card) 82'	Stadium: Okzhetpes Stadium; Attendance: 1,500; Referee: Igor Chesnokov

24 June 2015 17	Irtysh	1–1	Kairat	Pavlodar
19:00 (UTC+6)	Dudchenko 61'	Summary	Serginho (yellow card) 9'; Lunin (yellow card) 17'; Riera (yellow card) 20'; Gohou 79'	Stadium: Central Stadium; Attendance: 4,200; Referee: Ruslan Duzmambetov

28 June 2015 18	Irtysh	3–1	Shakhter Karagandy	Pavlodar
19:00 (UTC+6)	N'Diaye 33', 47'; Chernyshov 54'	Summary	Y. Tarasov (yellow card) 14'; Karpovich (yellow card) 18'; R. Murtazayev 30'; E. Kostrub (yellow card) 63'; Topčagić (yellow card) 68' (red card) 74'	Stadium: Central Stadium; Attendance: 4,500; Referee: Bolat Karlibayev

4 July 2015 19	Atyrau	0–0	Irtysh	Atyrau
20:00 (UTC+6)	Grigoryev (yellow card) 47'; Parkhachev (yellow card) 85'	Summary	Smakov (yellow card) 33'; N'Diaye (yellow card) 65'	Stadium: Munaishy Stadium; Attendance: 5,000; Referee: Askhat Abdanbayev

12 July 2015 20	Irtysh	1–0	Aktobe	Pavlodar
19:00 (UTC+6)	Chernyshov (yellow card) 67'; Kislitsyn (yellow card) 80'; Fonseca 90+1'	Summary	Žulpa (yellow card) 30'; D. Zhalmukan (yellow card) 73'; Pizzelli (yellow card) 90+4'	Stadium: Central Stadium; Referee: Artyom Kuchin

18 July 2015 21	Taraz	0–0	Irtysh	Taraz
18:00 (UTC+6)	Mukhutdinov (yellow card) 13'; M. Amirkhanov (yellow card) 49'; D. Vasiljev (yellow card) 66'; S. Zhumahanov (yellow card) 90+2'	Summary	Fonseca (yellow card) 40'	Stadium: Central Stadium; Attendance: 3,500; Referee: Denis Izmailov

26 July 2015 22	Irtysh	2–0	Ordabasy	Pavlodar
19:00 (UTC+6)	N'Diaye (yellow card) 17'; Dudchenko 49'; A. Ersalimov (yellow card) 68'; Roncatto 90' (pen.)	Summary	B. Beisenov (yellow card) 68'; E. Tungyshbaev (yellow card) 68'; Malyi (yellow card) 74'; Ashirbekov (yellow card) 80'; Geynrikh (red card) 87'	Stadium: Central Stadium; Attendance: 5,200; Referee: Aydin Rakhimbayev

===== League table =====
Pos	Team	Pld	W	D	L	GF	GA	GD	Pts	Qualification
4	Atyrau	22	9	10	3	25	19	+6	37	Qualification for the championship round
5	Ordabasy	22	9	8	5	21	18	+3	35	Qualification for the championship round
6	Irtysh Pavlodar	22	7	9	6	26	23	+3	30	Qualification for the championship round
7	Okzhetpes	22	8	2	12	24	33	−9	26	Qualification for the relegation round
8	Tobol	22	7	4	11	22	32	−10	25	Qualification for the relegation round

Source: UEFA.com, Soccerway
Rules for classification: 1) Points; 2) Matches won; 3) Head-to-head points; 4) Head-to-head matches won; 5) Head-to-head goal difference; 6) Head-to-head goals scored; 7) Head-to-head away goals scored; 8) Goal difference; 9) Goals scored; 10) Away goals scored; 11) Draw.

==== Championship round ====
===== Results summary =====
Overall								Home						Away					
Pld	W	D	L	GF	GA	GD	Pts	W	D	L	GF	GA	GD	W	D	L	GF	GA	GD
10	3	1	6	11	16	−5	10	3	0	2	6	5	+1	0	1	4	5	11	−6

Last updated: 9 November 2015.
Source: Soccerway

===== Results by round =====
Round	1	2	3	4	5	6	7	8	9	10
Ground	H	A	H	A	H	A	A	H	A	H
Result	W	L	W	D	W	L	L	L	L	L
Position	6	6	4	4	4	5	5	5	5	6

Source: Soccerway
A = Away; H = Home; W = Win; D = Draw; L = Loss

===== Results =====
15 August 2015 23	Irtysh	2–0	Atyrau	Pavlodar
19:00 (UTC+6)	Kassaï 37'; Smakov (yellow card) 74'; Roncatto (yellow card) 82', (goal) 87'; Kislitsyn (yellow card) 84'	Summary	R. Esatov (yellow card) 34'; V. Kuzmin (yellow card) 80'	Stadium: Central Stadium; Attendance: 4,500; Referee: Marat Iskakov

24 August 2015 24	Kairat	5–2	Irtysh	Almaty
20:00 (UTC+6)	Kuat 15' (yellow card) 72'; Gohou 67', 75'; E. Kuantayev 78'; Despotović 87'	Summary	Roncatto 7'; N'Diaye (yellow card) 32' (goal) 56'; Fonseca (yellow card) 71'; Kassaï (yellow card) 83'	Stadium: Central Stadium; Attendance: 6,000; Referee: Askhat Abdanbayev

12 September 2015 25	Irtysh	1–0	Aktobe	Pavlodar
17:00 (UTC+6)	N'Diaye (yellow card) 67'; Geteriev 83'	Summary	Adeleye (yellow card) 13'	Stadium: Central Stadium; Attendance: 3,200; Referee: Bolat Karlibayev

20 September 2015 26	Ordabasy	1–1	Irtysh	Shymkent
17:00 (UTC+6)	Junuzović 18'; Malyi (yellow card) 31'; Petrov (yellow card) 32'; G. Suyumbaev (yellow card) 77'	Summary	Fonseca (yellow card) 59'; Roncatto 79' (pen.)	Stadium: Kazhymukan Munaitpasov Stadium; Attendance: 3,000; Referee: Artyom Kuchin

26 September 2015 27	Irtysh	2–1	Astana	Pavlodar
16:00 (UTC+6)	N'Diaye 5'; Fonseca (yellow card) 21' (goal) 33'; Kislitsyn (yellow card) 47'	Summary	Maksimović 51'; Postnikov (yellow card) 56'; Kabananga (yellow card) 69'	Stadium: Central Stadium; Attendance: 4,000; Referee: Igor Chesnokov

3 October 2015 28	Irtysh	0–2	Kairat	Pavlodar
15:00 (UTC+6)	Aliev (yellow card) 70'	Summary	Despotović 2'; Bakayev (yellow card) 60'; Soares 78' (yellow card) 82'	Stadium: Central Stadium; Attendance: 4,200; Referee: Bolat Karlibayev

17 October 2015 29	Aktobe	3–2	Irtysh	Aktobe
17:00 (UTC+6)	Pizzelli (yellow card) 45+1' (goal) 49'; Khizhnichenko (yellow card) 53'; Danilo 59', 90+3'	Summary	Smakov (yellow card) 14' (goal) 65' (pen.); Dudchenko 69'	Stadium: Central Stadium; Attendance: 8,000; Referee: Denis Izmailov

25 October 2015 30	Irtysh	1–2	Ordabasy	Shymkent
15:00 (UTC+6)	N'Diaye (yellow card) 23'; Roncatto 34' (pen.); Kassaï (yellow card) 90+1'	Summary	Nurgaliev (yellow card) 33'; Mukhtarov (yellow card) 56'; Simčević 57'; E. Tungyshbaev 59'; Petrov (yellow card) 69'	Stadium: Kazhymukan Munaitpasov Stadium; Attendance: 3,500; Referee: Ruslan Duzmambetov

31 October 2015 31	Astana	1–0	Irtysh	Astana
15:00 (UTC+6)	Postnikov (yellow card) 26'; Nusserbayev 57'; Muzhikov (yellow card) 70'	Summary	Geteriev (yellow card) 13'; Chernyshov (yellow card) 37'	Stadium: Astana Arena; Attendance: 2,600; Referee: Askhat Abdanbayev

8 November 2015 32	Atyrau	1–0	Irtysh	Atyrau
15:00 (UTC+6)	Baizhanov 40'	Summary		Stadium: Munaishy Stadium; Attendance: 2,500; Referee: Artyom Kuchin

===== League table =====
Pos	Team	Pld	W	D	L	GF	GA	GD	Pts	Qualification
1	Astana (C)	32	20	7	5	55	26	+29	46	Qualification for the Champions League second qualifying round
2	Kairat	32	20	7	5	60	19	+41	45	Qualification for the Europa League first qualifying round (Note: Kairat qualified for the UEFA Europa League first qualifying round by winning the 2015 Kazakhstan Cup.)
3	Aktobe	32	15	9	8	35	25	+10	32	Qualification for the Europa League first qualifying round
4	Ordabasy	32	12	10	10	32	31	+1	29	Qualification for the Europa League first qualifying round
5	Atyrau	32	11	12	9	31	33	−2	27	
6	Irtysh Pavlodar	32	10	10	12	37	39	−2	25	

Source: Soccerway
Rules for classification: 1) Points; 2) Play-off (only if deciding champion when two teams are tied); 3) Matches won; 4) Head-to-head points; 5) Head-to-head matches won; 6) Head-to-head goal difference; 7) Head-to-head goals scored; 8) Head-to-head away goals scored; 9) Goal difference; 10) Goals scored; 11) Away goals scored; 12) Play-off (only if deciding champion when three or teams are tied); 13) Draw.
(C) Champions

=== Kazakhstan Cup ===
29 April 2015 Second round	Kairat	0–0 (a.e.t.) (4–1 p)	Irtysh	Almaty
19:00 (UTC+6)	Isael (yellow card) 15'; Pliyev (yellow card) 56'	Summary	Chernyshov (yellow card) 15'; Aliev (yellow card) 33'; Graf (yellow card) 66'; Sartakov (yellow card) 80'; Gatagov (yellow card) 116'; N. Kalmykov (yellow card) 120'	Stadium: Central Stadium; Attendance: 6,500; Referee: Igor Shesnokov
	Penalties
	Gohou (penalty scored); Isael (penalty scored); Islamkhan (penalty scored); Darabayev (penalty scored)		Bance (penalty missed); Bulgaru (penalty missed); Azuka (penalty scored)

== Squad statistics ==
As of Match played 8 November 2015

=== Appearances and goals ===
No.	Pos	Nat	Player	Total		Premier League		Kazakhstan Cup	
No.	Pos	Nat	Player	Apps	Goals	Apps	Goals	Apps	Goals
1	GK	(Kazakhstan) KAZ	David Loria	29	0	29	0	0	0
2	DF	(Kazakhstan) KAZ	Vladimir Sedelnikov	2	0	1+1	0	0	0
3	DF	(Kazakhstan) KAZ	Vladislav Chernyshov	26	1	25	1	1	0
4	DF	(Kazakhstan) KAZ	Aleksandr Kislitsyn	25	1	25	1	0	0
5	MF	(Kazakhstan) KAZ	Piraliy Aliev	25	1	18+6	1	1	0
8	DF	(Kazakhstan) KAZ	Samat Smakov	26	3	26	3	0	0
9	FW	(Kazakhstan) KAZ	Kuanysh Begalyn	3	0	0+3	0	0	0
11	FW	(Kazakhstan) KAZ	Yerkebulan Nurgaliyev	8	0	4+4	0	0	0
13	MF	(Kazakhstan) KAZ	Alibek Ayaganov	7	0	1+6	0	0	0
14	MF	(Kazakhstan) KAZ	Azat Ersalimov	17	1	9+7	1	1	0
17	MF	(Kazakhstan) KAZ	Abylaykhan Totay	3	0	0+3	0	0	0
19	DF	(Kazakhstan) KAZ	Grigori Sartakov	32	1	28+3	1	1	0
20	MF	(Czech Republic) CZE	Tomáš Jirsák	17	0	17	0	0	0
21	GK	(Kazakhstan) KAZ	Nikita Kalmykov	4	0	3	0	1	0
23	DF	(Kazakhstan) KAZ	Zakhar Korobov	1	0	1	0	0	0
25	DF	(Kazakhstan) KAZ	Ruslan Yesimov	14	0	8+5	0	1	0
30	FW	(Ukraine) UKR	Kostyantyn Dudchenko	21	8	16+5	8	0	0
33	MF	(Kazakhstan) KAZ	Kazbek Geteriev	23	1	22	1	1	0
40	MF	(Portugal) POR	Carlos Fonseca	14	2	14	2	0	0
50	DF	(Central African Republic) CAF	Fernander Kassaï	14	1	14	1	0	0
57	MF	(Kazakhstan) KAZ	Artyom Popov	1	0	0+1	0	0	0
60	FW	(Brazil) BRA	Evandro Roncatto	11	5	7+4	5	0	0
80	MF	(France) FRA	Alassane N'Diaye	16	5	16	5	0	0
90	DF	(Brazil) BRA	Antonio Ferreira	5	0	2+3	0	0	0
95	MF	(Kazakhstan) KAZ	Vladimir Vomenko	8	0	4+4	0	0	0
Players away from Irtysh on loan:
Players who appeared for Irtysh that left during the season:
7	MF	(Russia) RUS	Alan Gatagov	18	1	15+2	1	0+1	0
10	MF	(Kazakhstan) KAZ	Alisher Suley	9	0	3+5	0	1	0
15	FW	(Burkina Faso) BFA	Aristide Bancé	12	2	9+2	2	1	0
24	DF	(Moldova) MDA	Simeon Bulgaru	1	0	0	0	0+1	0
22	DF	(Russia) RUS	Artyom Samsonov	9	0	9	0	0	0
27	MF	(Russia) RUS	Sergei Ignatyev	6	0	2+3	0	1	0
55	DF	(Croatia) CRO	Ivan Graf	13	0	9+3	0	1	0
89	FW	(Nigeria) NGR	Izu Azuka	18	3	14+3	3	1	0

=== Goal scorers ===
Place	Position	Nation	Number	Name	Premier League	Kazakhstan Cup	Total
1	FW	(Ukraine)	30	Kostyantyn Dudchenko	8	0	8
2	MF	(France)	80	Alassane N'Diaye	5	0	5
2	FW	(Brazil)	60	Evandro Roncatto	5	0	5
4	FW	(Nigeria)	89	Izu Azuka	3	0	3
4	DF	(Kazakhstan)	8	Samat Smakov	3	0	3
6	FW	(Burkina Faso)	15	Aristide Bancé	2	0	2
6	MF	(Portugal)	40	Carlos Fonseca	2	0	2
8	MF	(Russia)	7	Alan Gatagov	1	0	1
8	DF	(Kazakhstan)	19	Grigori Sartakov	1	0	1
8	MF	(Kazakhstan)	5	Piraliy Aliev	1	0	1
8	MF	(Kazakhstan)	14	Azat Ersalimov	1	0	1
8	DF	(Kazakhstan)	4	Aleksandr Kislitsyn	1	0	1
8	DF	(Kazakhstan)	3	Vladislav Chernyshov	1	0	1
8	DF	(Central African Republic)	50	Fernander Kassaï	1	0	1
8	MF	(Kazakhstan)	33	Kazbek Geteriev	1	0	1
8				Own goal	1	0	1
				TOTALS	37	0	37

=== Disciplinary record ===
Number	Nation	Position	Name	Premier League		Kazakhstan Cup		Total	
Number	Nation	Position	Name	Yellow card	Red card	Yellow card	Red card	Yellow card	Red card
1	(Kazakhstan)	GK	David Loria	2	0	0	0	2	0
3	(Kazakhstan)	DF	Vladislav Chernyshov	6	2	1	0	7	2
4	(Kazakhstan)	DF	Aleksandr Kislitsyn	5	1	0	0	5	1
5	(Kazakhstan)	MF	Piraliy Aliev	3	1	1	0	4	1
7	(Russia)	MF	Alan Gatagov	2	0	1	0	3	0
8	(Kazakhstan)	MF	Samat Smakov	5	0	0	0	5	0
11	(Kazakhstan)	FW	Yerkebulan Nurgaliyev	2	0	0	0	2	0
14	(Kazakhstan)	MF	Azat Ersalimov	2	0	0	0	2	0
15	(Burkina Faso)	FW	Aristide Bancé	2	0	0	0	2	0
19	(Kazakhstan)	DF	Grigori Sartakov	3	0	1	0	4	0
21	(Kazakhstan)	GK	Nikita Kalmykov	0	0	1	0	1	0
22	(Russia)	DF	Artyom Samsonov	4	0	0	0	4	0
25	(Kazakhstan)	DF	Ruslan Yesimov	3	0	0	0	3	0
33	(Kazakhstan)	MF	Kazbek Geteriev	4	0	0	0	4	0
40	(Portugal)	MF	Carlos Fonseca	5	0	0	0	5	0
50	(Central African Republic)	DF	Fernander Kassaï	2	0	0	0	2	0
55	(Croatia)	DF	Ivan Graf	3	0	1	0	4	0
60	(Brazil)	FW	Evandro Roncatto	1	0	0	0	1	0
80	(France)	MF	Alassane N'Diaye	5	0	0	0	5	0
89	(Nigeria)	FW	Izu Azuka	4	0	0	0	4	0
			TOTALS	63	4	6	0	69	4
