= Artyom Samsonov =

Artyom Samsonov may refer to:

- Artyom Samsonov (footballer, born 1989), Russian footballer
- Artyom Samsonov (footballer, born 1994), Russian footballer
