= Alassane N'Diaye =

French-Senegalese footballer (born 1990)

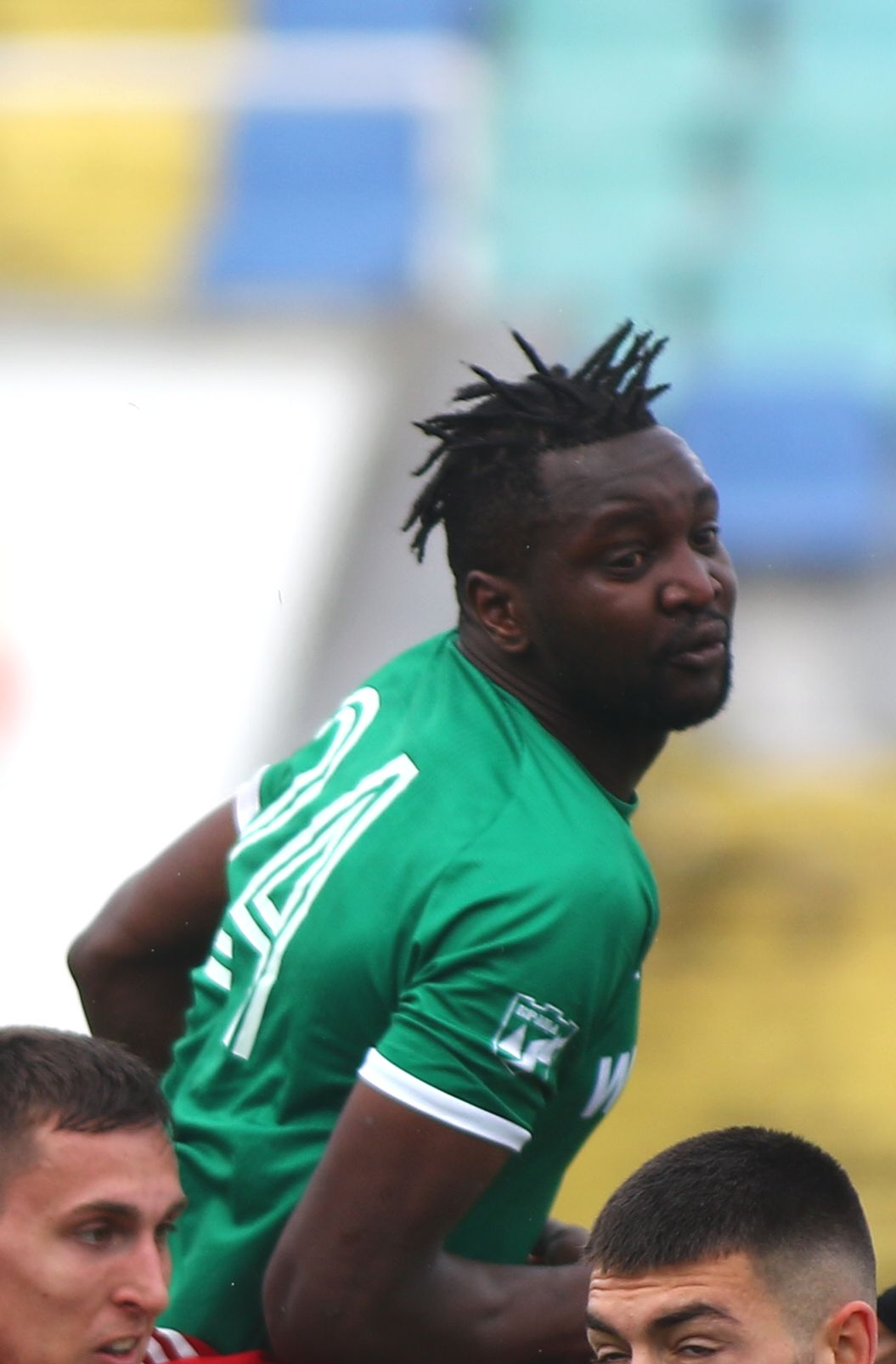

Personal information
- Full name: Alassane N'Diaye
- Date of birth: 25 February 1990 (age 36)
- Place of birth: Audincourt, France
- Height: 1.96 m (6 ft 5 in)
- Position: Midfielder

Youth career
- Sochaux
- FC Alle
- 2008–2009: Crystal Palace

Senior career*
Years	Team	Apps	(Gls)
2009–2011	Crystal Palace	38	(3)
2011	→ Swindon Town (loan)	6	(0)
2011	→ Southend United (loan)	1	(0)
2011–2012	Barnet	6	(0)
2012–2013	Hayes & Yeading United	20	(7)
2013	Hastings United	12	(2)
2013–2014	Lokomotiv Plovdiv	32	(4)
2014–2015	Beroe Stara Zagora	22	(2)
2015	Irtysh Pavlodar	16	(5)
2016	Tobol	10	(1)
2016–2017	ASM Belfort	4	(0)
2017	Chornomorets Odesa	10	(0)
2018	Sūduva	16	(2)
2019–2020	FC Grandvillars	0	(0)
2020–2021	Botev Vratsa	34	(2)
2021–2022	Khaitan SC		
2022–2023	FC Vesoul		
- * Club domestic league appearances and goals as of 00:39, 18 October 2021 (UTC)

Alassane N'Diaye (born 25 February 1990) is a French footballer who plays as a midfielder.

== Career ==
After developing his game at Sochaux in his native France and FC Alle in Switzerland, N'Diaye moved to English Championship side Crystal Palace to play first-team football.

He made his debut in August 2009, and scored his first goal for the Eagles in a win at West Bromwich Albion, before scoring again in a home win over Blackpool. However, N'Diaye's first-team appearances decreased over the course of the 2009–10 season, and they were even fewer and far between the following year. He finished the 2010–11 season on loan at Swindon Town, suffering relegation from League One, before moving to League Two side Southend United on a season-long loan in the 2011–12 season. However, this loan was cancelled after a bust-up with a teammate, and his contract at Palace was also cancelled 10 months early at this time.

In November 2011, N'Diaye signed a short-term contract with Barnet. However, he did not earn a regular first team place, appearing mainly as an unused substitute. In May 2012, N'Diaye was released by Barnet on the expiry of his contract.

In October 2012, he signed for Conference South side Hayes & Yeading United. Upon the move, N'Diaye says he wants his career to appear back on track after a frustrating first three years in English football. After making 27 appearances and scoring seven times, he was released in March 2013, ending rumours of his departure becoming more imminent. Following his released, N'Diaye was linked with Portsmouth.

In March 2013, he signed for Hastings United; scoring the winner in the local derby against Lewes on his debut. At the end of the season, with the club relegated, N'Diaye scored on his last appearance, in a 1-0 win over Kingstonian before leaving the club.

Soon after leaving Hastings United, N'Diaye joined Lokomotiv Plovdiv in the Bulgarian A Professional Football Group. He left the club at the end of the season but stayed in Bulgaria, signing for Beroe Stara Zagora. In June 2015, he moved to Kazakhstan to sign for Irtysh Pavlodar, scoring on his debut against Okzhetpes in a 1-0 win.

In December 2015, N'Diaye moved to fellow Kazakhstan Premier League side FC Tobol.

In September 2017, N'Diaye signed for a Ukrainian club FC Chornomorets Odesa.

In February 2018, N'Diaye signed for a Lithuanian A Lyga champion club Sūduva. He left the club at the end of 2018. He then returned to France to join FC Grandvillars in the summer 2019.

== Career statistics ==
As of match played 27 June 2016

Appearances and goals by club, season and competition
Club	Season	League			National Cup		League Cup		Continental		Other		Total	
Club	Season	Division	Apps	Goals	Apps	Goals	Apps	Goals	Apps	Goals	Apps	Goals	Apps	Goals
Crystal Palace	2009–10	Championship	26	3	1	0	2	0	-		-		29	3
Crystal Palace	2010–11	Championship	12	0	1	0	0	0	-		-		13	0
Crystal Palace	2011–12	Championship	0	0	0	0	0	0	-		-		0	0
Crystal Palace	Total		38	3	2	0	2	0	-	-	-	-	42	3
Swindon Town (loan)	2010–11	League One	6	0	0	0	0	0	-		-		6	0
Southend United (loan)	2011–12	League Two	1	0	0	0	0	0	-		-		1	0
Barnet	2011–12	League Two	6	0	0	0	0	0	-		-		6	0
Hayes & Yeading United	2012–13	Conference South	15	5	1	0	-		-		-		16	5
Hastings United	2012–13	Isthmian League Premier Division	12	2	0	0	-		-		-		12	2
Lokomotiv Plovdiv	2013–14	A Group	32	4	5	1	-		-		-		37	5
Beroe Stara Zagora	2014–15	A Group	22	7	1	0	-		-		-		23	7
Irtysh Pavlodar	2015	Kazakhstan Premier League	16	5	0	0	-		-		-		16	5
Tobol	2016	Kazakhstan Premier League	10	1	1	0	-		-		-		11	1
ASM Belfort	2016–17	Championnat National	4	0	0	0	-		-		-		4	0
ASM Belfort	2017–18	Championnat National 2	0	0	0	0	-		-		-		0	0
ASM Belfort	Total		4	0	0	0	-	-	-	-	-	-	4	0
Chornomorets Odesa	2017–18	Ukrainian Premier League	10	0	1	0	-		-		-		11	0
Sūduva	2018	A Lyga	16	2	1	0	-		-		1	0	18	2
Career total			188	29	12	1	2	0	-	-	1	0	203	30
