= Fernander Kassaï =

Central African Republic footballer

Personal information
- Date of birth: 1 July 1987 (age 39)
- Place of birth: Bimbo, Central African Republic
- Height: 1.85 m (6 ft 1 in)
- Position: Centre back

Senior career*
Years	Team	Apps	(Gls)
2005–2012	Le Mans B	93	(0)
2008–2009	→ Rouen (loan)	5	(0)
2009–2010	→ Romorantin (loan)	10	(1)
2012–2014	Le Mans	24	(0)
2014	Grenoble	5	(0)
2014–2015	Slavia Sofia	20	(0)
2015	→ Irtysh Pavlodar (loan)	14	(1)
2016–2019	Tobol	113	(4)
2020	Gaz Metan Mediaș	1	(0)

International career^{‡}
2010–	Central African Republic	17	(0)
- * Club domestic league appearances and goals as of 11:50, 13 September 2020 (UTC) ‡ National team caps and goals as of 08:38, 21 February 2019 (UTC)

Fernander Kassaï (born 1 July 1987) is a Central African international footballer who last played for Romanian club Gaz Metan Mediaș

== Career ==
=== Club ===
Born in Bimbo, Kassaï has played in France for Le Mans B, Rouen, Romorantin and Le Mans.

In June 2015, Kassaï moved to Irtysh Pavlodar on loan until the end of the 2015 season.

In December 2015, following a successful loan period in Kazakhstan, Slavia Sofia sold Kassaï to Tobol. On 15 December 2019, Tobol announced that Kassaï had left the club at the end of his contract.

In August 2020 he signed for Gaz Metan Mediaș.

=== International ===
In January 2008 he was called up for a training camp with the French under-21 futsal team for a 4-day camp.

Kassaï made his international debut for Central African Republic in 2010, and has appeared in FIFA World Cup qualifying matches.

== Career statistics ==
=== Club ===
As of match played 30 October 2019

Appearances and goals by club, season and competition
Club	Season	League			National Cup		Continental		Other		Total	
Club	Season	Division	Apps	Goals	Apps	Goals	Apps	Goals	Apps	Goals	Apps	Goals
Slavia Sofia	2014–15	A Group	20	0	3	0	-		-		23	0
Irtysh Pavlodar (loan)	2015	Kazakhstan Premier League	14	1	0	0	-		-		14	1
Tobol	2016	Kazakhstan Premier League	25	0	0	0	-		-		25	0
Tobol	2017	Kazakhstan Premier League	31	2	1	0	-		-		32	2
Tobol	2018	Kazakhstan Premier League	29	0	2	0	4	0	-		35	0
Tobol	2019	Kazakhstan Premier League	28	2	3	0	2	0	-		33	2
Tobol	Total		113	4	6	0	6	0	-	-	125	4
Career total			147	5	9	0	6	0	-	-	162	5

=== International ===
As of 21 February 2019

Central African Republic
Year	Apps	Goals
2010	1	0
2011	3	0
2012	3	0
2013	2	0
2014	3	0
2015	1	0
2016	3	0
2017	0	0
2018	1	0
Total	17	0
