= Kazbek Geteriev =

Kazakhstani footballer (born 1985)

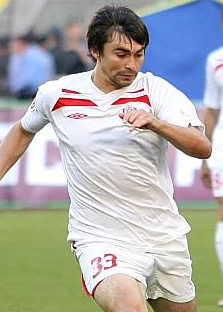

Personal information
- Full name: Kazbek Khazizovich Geteriev
- Date of birth: 30 June 1985 (age 41)
- Place of birth: Proletarskoye, Prokhladnensky District, Soviet Russia
- Height: 1.72 m (5 ft 8 in)
- Position: Midfielder

Youth career
- DYuSSh-2 Smena Prokhladny

Senior career*
Years	Team	Apps	(Gls)
2005–2010	Spartak Nalchik	83	(3)
2011	Zhemchuzhina-Sochi	12	(1)
2011–2012	Alania Vladikavkaz	15	(0)
2013	Kairat	19	(0)
2014	Ordabasy	10	(0)
2014	Kaisar	2	(0)
2015–2017	Irtysh	64	(3)
2018–2019	Okzhetpes	24	(0)
2019	Caspiy	22	(0)
2020	Kyzyltash Bakhchisaray		
2020–2021	Spartak Nalchik	19	(0)

International career
2010–2015	Kazakhstan	7	(0)
- * Club domestic league appearances and goals

Kazbek Khazizovich Geteriev (Russian: Казбек Хазизович Гетериев; born 30 June 1985) is a Kazakhstani former footballer.

== Career ==
=== Club ===
He made his Russian Premier League debut for PFC Spartak Nalchik on 30 June 2007 in a game against FC Luch-Energiya Vladivostok.

=== International ===
In 2010, he took the Kazakhstani citizenship to play for the national team.

== Career statistics ==
=== International ===
Kazakhstan national team
Year	Apps	Goals
2010	3	0
2011	2	0
2012	0	0
2013	1	0
2014	0	0
2015	1	0
Total	7	0

Statistics accurate as of match played 10 October 2015
