= Aleksei Shumskikh =

Russian footballer

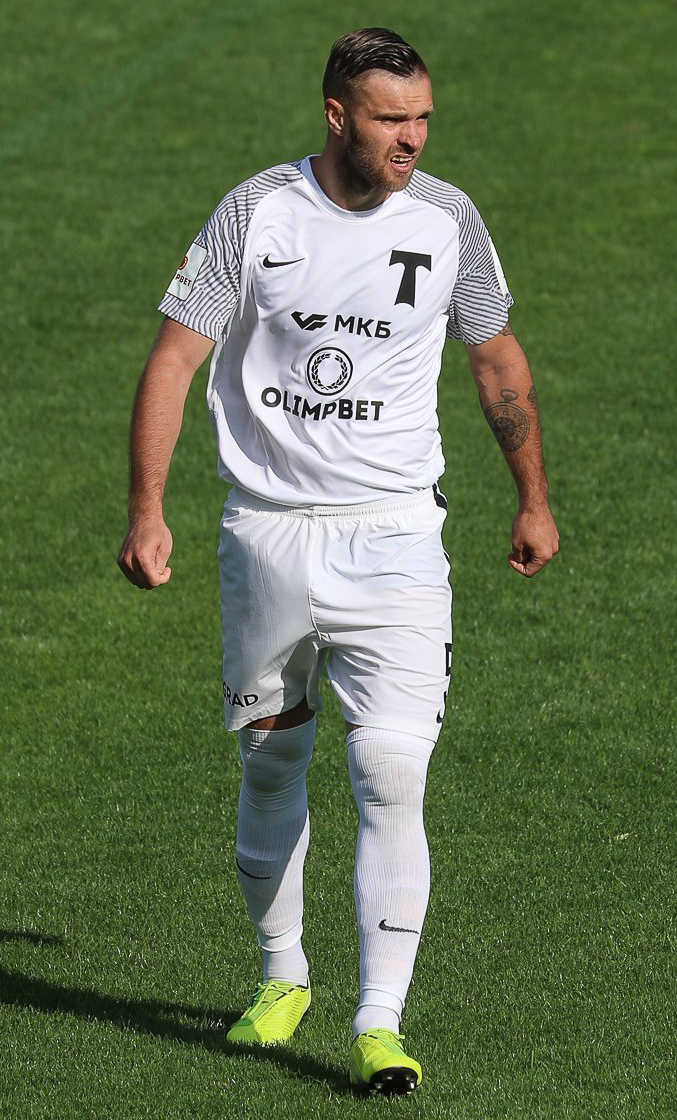
- Shumskikh with Torpedo Moscow in 2021

Personal information
- Full name: Aleksei Alekseyevich Shumskikh
- Date of birth: 1 July 1990 (age 36)
- Place of birth: Barnaul, Russian SFSR
- Height: 1.89 m (6 ft 2 in)
- Position: Centre-back

Senior career*
Years	Team	Apps	(Gls)
2008	Torpedo Moscow	11	(1)
2009	Sportakademklub Moscow	11	(2)
2009	Saturn-2 Moscow Oblast	10	(0)
2010	Neftekhimik Nizhnekamsk	19	(0)
2011–2012	Zenit Penza	53	(0)
2013–2014	Strogino Moscow	28	(0)
2014	Kaluga	17	(0)
2015–2018	Khimki	107	(4)
2018–2019	Tom Tomsk	45	(4)
2020	Kaisar	1	(0)
2020–2021	Nizhny Novgorod	36	(2)
2021–2022	Torpedo Moscow	40	(4)
2022–2023	Arsenal Tula	4	(0)
2023–2025	Rotor Volgograd	56	(2)

International career
2008–2009	Russia U19	7	(0)
- * Club domestic league appearances and goals

Aleksei Alekseyevich Shumskikh (Russian: Алексей Алексеевич Шумских; born 1 July 1990) is a Russian former professional football player.

== Club career ==
Shumskikh made his Russian Football National League debut for FC Torpedo Moscow on 16 April 2008 in a game against FC Metallurg-Kuzbass Novokuznetsk.

On 10 February 2020, FC Kaisar announced the signing of Shumskikh.

On 17 June 2020, Shumskikh signed for Nizhny Novgorod.

Shumskikh made his Russian Premier League debut for FC Torpedo Moscow on 17 July 2022 against PFC Sochi.

== Honours ==
Torpedo Moscow

- Russian Football National League : 2021-22

== Career statistics ==
As of 27 November 2022

Club	Season	League			Cup		Continental		Other		Total	
Club	Season	Division	Apps	Goals	Apps	Goals	Apps	Goals	Apps	Goals	Apps	Goals
Torpedo Moscow	2008	First League	11	1	0	0	–		–		11	1
Sportakademklub Moscow	2009	Second League	11	2	1	0	–		–		12	2
Saturn-2 Moscow Oblast	2009	Second League	10	0	–		–		–		10	0
Neftekhimik Nizhnekamsk	2010	Second League	19	0	1	1	–		–		20	1
Zenit Penza	2011–12	Second League	37	0	2	0	–		–		39	0
Zenit Penza	2012–13	Second League	16	0	1	0	–		–		17	0
Zenit Penza	Total		53	0	3	0	0	0	0	0	56	0
Strogino Moscow	2013–14	Second League	28	0	3	0	–		–		31	0
Kaluga	2014–15	Second League	17	0	2	0	–		–		19	0
Khimki	2014–15	Second League	9	1	–		–		–		9	1
Khimki	2015–16	Second League	28	2	6	0	–		–		34	2
Khimki	2016–17	First League	36	0	2	0	–		–		38	0
Khimki	2017–18	First League	34	1	2	0	–		–		36	1
Khimki	Total		107	4	10	0	0	0	0	0	117	4
Tom Tomsk	2018–19	First League	31	3	0	0	–		2 (Note: Appearances in the promotion play-offs)	0	33	3
Tom Tomsk	2019–20	First League	14	1	1	0	–		–		15	1
Tom Tomsk	Total		45	4	1	0	0	0	2	0	48	4
Kaisar	2020	Kazakhstan Premier League	1	0	–		–		0	0	1	0
Nizhny Novgorod	2020–21	First League	36	2	3	0	–		–		39	2
Torpedo Moscow	2021–22	First League	37	4	1	0	–		–		38	4
Torpedo Moscow	2022–23	Premier League	3	0	0	0	–		–		3	0
Torpedo Moscow	Total (2 spells)		51	5	1	0	0	0	2	0	52	5
Arsenal Tula	2022–23	First League	4	0	0	0	–		–		4	0
Career total			382	17	25	1	0	0	2	0	409	18
