= Vyacheslav Kotlyar =

Ukrainian footballer (born 1982)

Personal information
- Full name: Vyacheslav Vyacheslavovych Kotlyar
- Date of birth: 3 March 1982 (age 44)
- Place of birth: Kyiv, Ukrainian SSR
- Position: Goalkeeper

Senior career*
Years	Team	Apps	(Gls)
1999–2000	FC Mykolaiv	3	(0)
2000–2001	FC LNZ Cherkasy-2	3	(0)
2001–2003	FC Halychyna Drohobych	41	(0)
2003–2005	FC Skala Stryi	27	(0)
2005	FC Knyazha Shchaslyve	2	(0)
2006	FC Spartak Sumy	2	(0)
2006–2007	FC Knyazha Shchaslyve	2	(0)
2007–2009	FC Kazakhmys	77	(0)
2010	FC Ile-Saulet	10	(0)
2011	FC Astana	0	(0)
2012–2014	FC Irtysh Pavlodar	57	(0)
2015	FC Shakhter Karagandy	0	(0)
2016	FC Altai	11	(0)
2017	FC Akzhayik	16	(0)
2018	FC Tobol	3	(0)
- * Club domestic league appearances and goals

Vyacheslav Vyacheslavovych Kotlyar (Ukrainian: Вячеслав Котляр; born 3 March 1982) is a Ukrainian former footballer who played as a goalkeeper.

== Early life ==
Kotlyar was born in 1982 in Ukraine. He is a native of Kyiv, Ukraine. He aspired to join the Ukrainian military as a child.

== Career ==
Kotlyar started his career with Ukrainian side FC Mykolaiv. In 2000, he signed for Ukrainian side FC LNZ Cherkasy-2. In 2001, he signed for Ukrainian side FC Halychyna Drohobych. In 2003, he signed for Ukrainian side FC Skala Stryi. In 2005, he signed for Ukrainian side FC Knyazha Shchaslyve. In 2006, he signed for Ukrainian side FC Spartak Sumy. After that, he returned to Ukrainian side FC Knyazha Shchaslyve. In 2007, he signed for Kazakhstani side FC Kazakhmys. He helped the club achieve promotion. In 2010, he signed for Kazakhstani side FC Ile-Saulet. In 2011, he signed for Kazakhstani side FC Astana. In 2012, he signed for Kazakhstani side FC Irtysh Pavlodar. He was described as "established himself as one of the best goalkeepers in the Kazakhstan championship" while playing for the club. In 2015, he signed for Kazakhstani side FC Shakhter Karagandy. In 2016, he signed for Kazakhstani side FC Altai. In 2017, he signed for Kazakhstani side FC Akzhayik. He did not concede a goal for 227 minutes while playing for the club. In 2018, he signed for Kazakhstani side FC Tobol.

== Personal life ==
Kotlyar has children. He obtained a Kazakhstani passport.
