= Clarence Bitang =

Cameroonian footballer

Personal information
- Full name: Clarence Junior Bitang
- Date of birth: 2 September 1992 (age 34)
- Place of birth: Douala, Cameroon
- Height: 1.72 m (5 ft 8 in)
- Position: Midfielder

Team information
- Current team: Tishreen sc
- Number: 20

Senior career*
Years	Team	Apps	(Gls)
2010–2011	Astres	25	(11)
2011–2012	Buriram PEA	62	(30)
2012–2013	Chainat	30	(14)
2013–2014	Paniliakos	24	(1)
2014–2015	Olympiacos Volos	31	(4)
2015–2016	Agrotikos Asteras	15	(2)
2016–2017	Union Douala		
2018–2019	Vardar	43	(0)
2019–2022	Kaisar	45	(1)
2022–2023	Al-Wehdat		
2023	Al-Hussein	0	(0)
2023	→ Hajer (loan)	17	(1)
2023–2024	Hajer		
2024–	Al-Zawraa	36	

International career^{‡}
2017–2018	Cameroon	5	(0)
- * Club domestic league appearances and goals as of 9 March 2026 ‡ National team caps and goals as of 10 February 2018

Clarence Junior Bitang (sometimes referred to as Clarence Batang; born September 2, 1992) is a Cameroonian footballer who plays for Al-Zawraa as a midfielder.

== Career ==
Bitang played in Cameroon, Thailand and Greece before coming to Macedonia. He debuted for Cameroon national football team in 2017.

In February 2018, Bitang signed for FK Vardar.

On 1 August 2019, Bitang signed for FC Kaisar.

On 10 January 2023, Bitang joined Al-Hussein on a two-year deal. On 18 January 2023, Bitang joined Hajer on loan.

On 11 July 2023, Bitang joined Hajer on a permanent deal.

== Honours ==
Buriram PEA

- Thai Premier League: 2011
- Thai FA Cup: 2011
- Thai League Cup: 2011
