= Artyom Samsonov (footballer, born 1989) =

Russian footballer

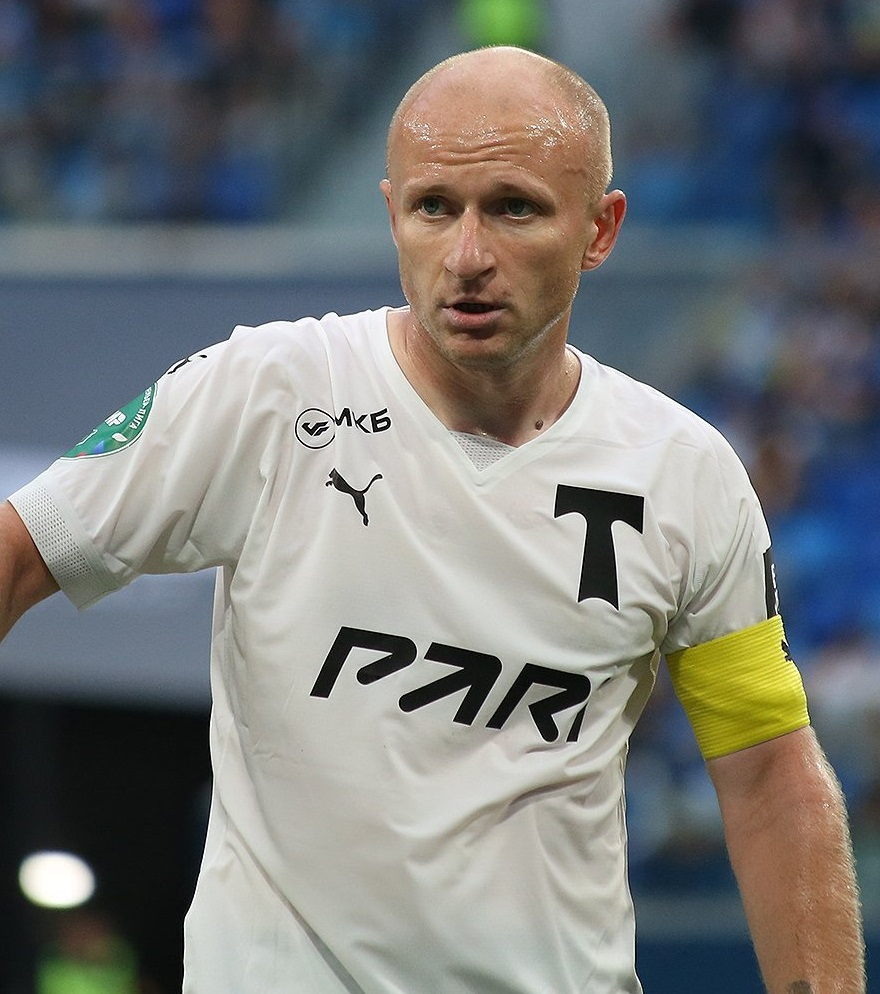
- Samsonov with Torpedo Moscow in 2022

Personal information
- Full name: Artyom Vladimirovich Samsonov
- Date of birth: 6 February 1989 (age 37)
- Place of birth: Stary Oskol, Russian SFSR
- Height: 1.83 m (6 ft 0 in)
- Position: Left-back

Team information
- Current team: Germes Moscow

Youth career
- –2005: Torpedo Moscow

Senior career*
Years	Team	Apps	(Gls)
2006–2007	Torpedo Moscow	6	(0)
2008	Dynamo Bryansk	16	(0)
2008	Dynamo Barnaul	13	(1)
2009–2010	Torpedo-ZIL Moscow	25	(0)
2010	→ Metallurg-Oskol Stary Oskol (loan)	28	(10)
2011–2013	Torpedo Moscow	51	(0)
2013–2014	Sibir Novosibirsk	30	(0)
2014	Khimik Dzerzhinsk	10	(1)
2015	Irtysh Pavlodar	9	(0)
2015–2018	Energomash Belgorod	62	(6)
2018–2023	Torpedo Moscow	147	(7)
2023	→ Torpedo-2	1	(0)
2023–2024	Ufa	25	(0)
2024–2025	Chelyabinsk	23	(0)
2025	Match Moscow (amateur)		
2025–	Germes Moscow (amateur)		

International career
2006	Russia U17	5	(0)
- * Club domestic league appearances and goals as of 28 August 2025

Artyom Vladimirovich Samsonov (Russian: Артём Владимирович Самсонов; born 6 February 1989) is a Russian footballer. He plays for amateur club Germes Moscow.

== Career ==
=== Club ===
He made his professional debut in the Russian Football National League in 2007 for Torpedo Moscow.

On 23 January 2015, Samsonov signed for Kazakhstan Premier League side Irtysh Pavlodar.

Samsonov made his Russian Premier League debut for Torpedo Moscow on 17 July 2022 against Sochi. On 30 May 2023, Samsonov extended his contract with Torpedo for the 2023–24 season.

=== International ===
Samsonov was one of the members of the Russian U-17 squad that won the 2006 UEFA U-17 Championship.

== Honours ==
Torpedo Moscow

- Russian Football National League : 2021-22

== Career statistics ==
As of 27 November 2022

Club	Season	League			Cup		Continental		Total	
Club	Season	Division	Apps	Goals	Apps	Goals	Apps	Goals	Apps	Goals
Torpedo Moscow	2007	First League	6	0	–		–		6	0
Dynamo Bryansk	2008	First League	16	0	–		–		16	0
Dynamo Barnaul	2008	First League	13	1	1	0	–		14	1
Torpedo-ZIL Moscow	2009	Second League	25	0	3	0	–		28	0
Metallurg-Oskol	2010	Second League	28	10	0	0	–		28	10
Torpedo Moscow	2011–12	First League	35	0	1	0	–		36	0
Torpedo Moscow	2012–13	First League	16	0	1	0	–		17	0
Sibir Novosibirsk	2013–14	First League	30	0	0	0	–		30	0
Khimik Dzerzhinsk	2014–15	First League	10	1	1	0	–		11	1
Irtysh Pavlodar	2015	Kazakhstan Premier League	9	0	–		–		9	0
Energomash Belgorod	2015–16	Second League	22	1	–		–		22	1
Energomash Belgorod	2016–17	Second League	16	1	4	0	–		20	1
Energomash Belgorod	2017–18	Second League	24	4	3	0	–		27	4
Energomash Belgorod	Total		62	6	7	0	0	0	69	6
Torpedo Moscow	2018–19	Second League	22	1	4	0	–		26	1
Torpedo Moscow	2019–20	First League	26	0	4	0	–		30	0
Torpedo Moscow	2020–21	First League	36	4	1	0	–		37	4
Torpedo Moscow	2021–22	First League	36	2	2	0	–		38	2
Torpedo Moscow	2022–23	Premier League	15	0	6	0	–		21	0
Torpedo Moscow	Total (3 spells)		192	7	19	0	0	0	211	7
Career total			385	25	31	0	0	0	416	25
