= Ivan Graf =

Croatian footballer

Personal information
- Date of birth: 17 June 1987 (age 39)
- Place of birth: Zagreb, Croatia
- Height: 1.94 m (6 ft 4 in)
- Position: Defender

Team information
- Current team: Opatija
- Number: 5

Youth career
- –2006: Kustošija

Senior career*
Years	Team	Apps	(Gls)
2006–2007	Kustošija		
2007–2009	Vrapče		
2009–2010	Primorje	39	(4)
2011	Tavriya Simferopol	9	(0)
2012–2013	Lučko	16	(0)
2013	NK Zagreb	13	(0)
2013–2014	Istra 1961	26	(1)
2015	Irtysh	12	(0)
2016–2021	Kaisar	110	(5)
2021–2022	Shakhter Karagandy	25	(1)
2023	Kyzylzhar	21	(1)
2024–	Opatija	8	(0)
- * Club domestic league appearances and goals as of 4 October 2024

Ivan Graf (born 17 June 1987) is a Croatian footballer who plays as a defender for Opatija.

== Club career ==
Born in capital city of Croatia, Zagreb, Graf started his football path in football school of local city based lower league Kustošija football club where he spent his entire youth career. With Kustošija he also kicked off his senior career in 2006–07 season which was his first senior competitive season. After debut season with Kustošija he decided to leave his domestic club on a free transfer and joined another lower league city club, neighbouring Vrapče on a two-year contract for the start of 2007–08 season. Graf spent two consecutive seasons with Vrapče and by the end of 2008–09 season with his two-year contract completed he decided not to extend his contract and stay at Vrapče. He felt as a free player it was time to move on and to change the domain of Croatian lower league football after playing it for three seasons.

=== Primorje Ajdovščina ===
Therefore, joining Slovenian club Primorje Ajdovščina the following season was seen as uncommon move due to general opinion at the time that Slovenian football was limited compared to Croatian one in almost all aspects of football such as tactics, training, style of play, finance, managing, fan base and overall status of football and was not attractive enough for Croatian football players whose financial demands were higher. However, Graf made a firm decision to join NK Primorje Ajdovščina due to initiative from Primorje head coach Vjekoslav Lokica. Croatian coach Lokica after tight relegation from Slovenian PrvaLiga in 2008–09 season was preparing the team for express comeback and saw in young Graf a key figure to secure the promotion. NK Primorje was seen till then for a number of seasons as a stable Slovenian first division club and with Graf in defence they achieved the goal, becoming Slovenian Second League Champions with only two games lost and sixteen goals conceded in entire 2009–10 season winning so promotion to Slovenian PrvaLiga for 2010–11 season in style. In October 2010, it was announced that the salaries of him along with four other players were due. As a result, he started a legal procedure. He was also linked to a transfer to fellow Slovenian club Domžale.

In March 2011, he moved to Ukrainian club Tavriya on a two-year contract and became the sixth signing for the club in the winter transfer window. In October, his contract was terminated by mutual consent.

Graf returned to Croatia in 2012 and signed for Lučko on an undisclosed fee. In 2013, he was transferred to Zagreb. In July, he joined fellow Croatian club Istra 1961. He made his debut in a 3–1 victory against Osijek where he scored a goal in the 59th minute.

=== Kazakhstan ===
Graf joined Kazakhstan Premier League team FC Irtysh Pavlodar at the start of the 2015 season, being told he could leave the club in July 2015, before signing a new one-year deal with Irtysh Pavlodar in January 2016. Prior to the 2016 season, Graf joined FC Kaisar. On 4 February 2021, Graf joined Shakhter Karagandy from Kaisar. On 29 January 2023, Graf signed a contract with FC Kyzylzhar.
