= 2016 FC Ordabasy season =

FC Ordabasy
2016 season
- Chairman: Sagat Yensegenuly
- Manager: Bakhtiar Baiseitov
- Stadium: Kazhymukan Munaitpasov Stadium
- Kazakhstan Premier League: 4th
- Kazakhstan Cup: Quarterfinal vs Atyrau
- Europa League: First Qualifying Round vs Čukarički
- Top goalscorer: League: Alexander Geynrikh (10); All: Alexander Geynrikh (11)
Home colours	Away colours

The 2016 FC Ordabasy season is their 14th season in the Kazakhstan Premier League, the highest tier of association football in Kazakhstan, following their promotion from to the Kazakhstan First Division in 2003. Ordabasy will also play in the UEFA Europa League and Kazakhstan Cup.

== Squad ==
As of 4 August 2016

Note: Flags indicate national team as defined under FIFA eligibility rules; some limited exceptions apply. Players may hold more than one non-FIFA nationality.

No.	Pos.	Nation	Player
1	GK	KAZ	Almat Bekbaev
2	DF	KAZ	Baudaulet Kozhabayev
4	DF	KAZ	Mukhtar Mukhtarov
6	MF	NGR	Dominic Chatto
8	MF	KAZ	Bekzat Beisenov
9	FW	MNE	Filip Kasalica
10	MF	KAZ	Kairat Ashirbekov
11	FW	KAZ	Dauren Kaykibasov
14	DF	KAZ	Farkhadbek Irismetov
15	DF	SRB	Branislav Trajković
17	MF	KAZ	Mardan Tolebek

No.	Pos.	Nation	Player
18	DF	KAZ	Samat Smakov
21	MF	KAZ	Yerkebulan Tungyshbayev
22	MF	SEN	Abdoulaye Diakate
23	DF	KAZ	Rinat Abdulin
29	GK	KAZ	Sergey Boychenko
34	MF	GEO	Gogita Gogua
50	MF	UZB	Alexander Geynrikh
77	DF	KAZ	Talgat Adyrbekov
87	DF	SRB	Aleksandar Simčević
99	FW	GEO	Otar Martsvaladze
—	GK	KAZ	Yaroslav Bondarenko

=== Out on loan ===
Note: Flags indicate national team as defined under FIFA eligibility rules; some limited exceptions apply. Players may hold more than one non-FIFA nationality.

No.	Pos.	Nation	Player
7	MF	KAZ	Azat Nurgaliev (at Astana)

== Transfers ==
=== Winter ===
In: Note: Flags indicate national team as defined under FIFA eligibility rules; some limited exceptions apply. Players may hold more than one non-FIFA nationality.

No.	Pos.	Nation	Player
1	GK	KAZ	Almat Bekbaev (from (Kazakhstan) Aktobe)
6	MF	NGR	Dominic Chatto (from (Norway) Bodø/Glimt)
9	FW	MNE	Filip Kasalica (from (Croatia) Istra 1961)
14	MF	KAZ	Farkhadbek Irismetov (from (Kazakhstan) Kaisar)
22	MF	SEN	Abdoulaye Diakate (from (Kazakhstan) Atyrau)
84	FW	SRB	Miloš Trifunović (from (Australia) Newcastle Jets)
—	GK	KAZ	Kirill Korotkevich (from (Kazakhstan) Tobol)

Out: Note: Flags indicate national team as defined under FIFA eligibility rules; some limited exceptions apply. Players may hold more than one non-FIFA nationality.

No.	Pos.	Nation	Player
1	GK	KAZ	Samat Otarbayev (to (Kazakhstan) Aktobe)
12	MF	UKR	Artem Kasyanov (to (Ukraine) Metalist Kharkiv)
19	MF	KAZ	Ular Zhaksybaev (to (Kazakhstan) Kaisar)
22	MF	KAZ	Rauan Sariev
25	DF	KAZ	Serhiy Malyi (to (Kazakhstan) Astana)
26	MF	UKR	Kyrylo Petrov (to (Ukraine) Olimpik Donetsk)
40	FW	BIH	Ivan Božić (to (Croatia) Šibenik)
55	GK	KAZ	Andrei Sidelnikov (to (Kazakhstan) Kairat)
89	FW	KAZ	Sanjar Abdimanap

Trialists: Note: Flags indicate national team as defined under FIFA eligibility rules; some limited exceptions apply. Players may hold more than one non-FIFA nationality.

No.	Pos.	Nation	Player
—	MF	GER	Savio Nsereko
—	MF	SEN	Abdoulaye Diakate
—	MF	SRB	Vladimir Radivojević

=== Summer ===
In: Note: Flags indicate national team as defined under FIFA eligibility rules; some limited exceptions apply. Players may hold more than one non-FIFA nationality.

No.	Pos.	Nation	Player
18	DF	KAZ	Samat Smakov (from (Kazakhstan) Aktobe)
34	MF	GEO	Gogita Gogua (from (Kazakhstan) Irtysh Pavlodar)
99	FW	GEO	Otar Martsvaladze (from (Georgia (country)) Dila Gori)

Out: Note: Flags indicate national team as defined under FIFA eligibility rules; some limited exceptions apply. Players may hold more than one non-FIFA nationality.

No.	Pos.	Nation	Player
5	DF	KAZ	Gafurzhan Suyumbaev (to (Kazakhstan) Kairat)
7	MF	KAZ	Azat Nurgaliev (loan to (Kazakhstan) Astana)
18	FW	KAZ	Daurenbek Tazhimbetov (to (Kazakhstan) Taraz)
28	FW	CRO	Edin Junuzović
84	FW	SRB	Miloš Trifunović
—	GK	KAZ	Kirill Korotkevich (to (Kazakhstan) Taraz)

== Friendlies ==
16 January 2016	Ordabasy (Kazakhstan)	4 – 1	(Azerbaijan) Zira	Belek, Turkey
21:00 (UTC+6)	Radivojević 40'; Nurgaliev 45'; D.Kaykibasov 65'; Junuzović 66'	Summary	N.Novruzov 55'

19 January 2016	Ordabasy (Kazakhstan)	0 – 2	(Iran) Siah Jamegan Khorasan	Belek, Turkey
(UTC+6)		Summary	Ahmed 55' (pen.); Rasul 68'

23 January 2016	Ordabasy (Kazakhstan)	0 – 1	(Germany) BFC Viktoria 1889	Belek, Turkey
(UTC+6)		Summary

27 January 2016	Ordabasy (Kazakhstan)	1 – 4	(North Macedonia) Shkëndija	Belek, Turkey
(UTC+6)	Kasalica	Summary

12 February 2016	Ordabasy (Kazakhstan)	2 – 1	(Serbia) Napredak Kruševac	Belek, Turkey
15:00 (UTC+6)	Nurgaliev; Savio	Summary	Goal

13 February 2016	Ordabasy (Kazakhstan)	3 – 1	Ghana U23	Belek, Turkey
(UTC+6)	Savio; Tazhimbetov	Summary	Goal

17 February 2016	Ordabasy (Kazakhstan)	–	(Belarus) Belshina Bobruisk	Belek, Turkey
21:00 (UTC+6)		[ Summary]

22 February 2016	Ordabasy (Kazakhstan)	–	(Ukraine) Stal Dniprodzerzhynsk	Belek, Turkey
21:00 (UTC+6)		[ Summary]

== Competitions ==
=== Kazakhstan Premier League ===
==== Regular season ====
===== Results summary =====
Overall								Home						Away					
Pld	W	D	L	GF	GA	GD	Pts	W	D	L	GF	GA	GD	W	D	L	GF	GA	GD
22	9	6	7	26	27	−1	33	6	2	3	16	13	+3	3	4	4	10	14	−4

Last updated: 26 July 2016.
Source: See Results

===== Results by round =====
Round	1	2	3	4	5	6	7	8	9	10	11	12	13	14	15	16	17	18	19	20	21	22
Ground	H	H	A	H	A	H	A	H	A	H	A	A	H	A	H	A	H	H	H	A	H	A
Result	W	L	W	D	L	W	L	W	D	W	W	L	L	L	W	D	D	W	W	D	L	D
Position	1	5	4	6	5	4	4	4	4	4	4	5	5	6	5	5	5	5	5	5	5	5

Source: See results
A = Away; H = Home; W = Win; D = Draw; L = Loss

===== Results =====
13 March 2016 1	Ordabasy	3 – 1	Aktobe	Shymkent
15:00 (UTC+6)	Nurgaliev 34' (pen.), 53'; Junuzović 45+2' (yellow card) 46'; G.Suyumbaev (yellow card) 63'	Summary	Smakov (yellow card) 34'; B.Davlatov 68'	Stadium: Kazhymukan Munaitpasov Stadium; Attendance: 4,500; Referee: Artyom Kuchin

20 March 2016 2	Ordabasy	1 – 3	Astana	Shymkent
15:00 (UTC+6)	Junuzović 15'; Kasalica (yellow card) 48'; Mukhtarov (yellow card) 73' (yellow-red card) 90+5'; Tungyshbayev (yellow card) 73'	Summary	Despotović 11'; Simčević 43' (o.g.); Aničić 45'; Postnikov (yellow card) 58'; Muzhikov (yellow card) 73' (yellow-red card) 89'	Stadium: Kazhymukan Munaitpasov Stadium; Attendance: 9,000; Referee: Bolat Karlibayev

3 April 2016 3	Zhetysu	1 – 2	Astana	Taldykorgan
15:00 (UTC+6)	Rudzik (yellow card) 28'; Kadio 90'	Summary	Junuzović 25'; Simčević (yellow card) 27'; Tungyshbayev (yellow card) 33' (yellow-red card) 67'; Nurgaliev 38'; Boychenko (yellow card) 80'	Stadium: Zhetysu Stadium; Attendance: 1,500; Referee: Aleksandr Aliyev

9 April 2016 4	Ordabasy	2 – 2	Tobol	Shymkent
15:00 (UTC+6)	M.Tolebek 5'; Nurgaliev (yellow card) 35'; G.Suyumbaev (yellow card) 37' (red card) 37'; Diakate 66' (yellow card) 68'; B.Kozhabayev (yellow card) 84'	Summary	Šimkovič 22'; Mukhutdinov (yellow card) 57'; Zhumaskaliyev 90+3'	Stadium: Kazhymukan Munaitpasov Stadium; Attendance: 3,000; Referee: Viktor Antonov

13 April 2016 5	Irtysh Pavlodar	2 – 0	Ordabasy	Pavlodar
18:00 (UTC+6)	R.Murtazayev 63'; Gogua 74' (pen.); Fonseca (yellow card) 78'; Herrera (yellow card) 87'	Summary	Abdulin (yellow card) 28'; B.Kozhabayev (yellow card) 74'; Tungyshbayev (yellow card) 80'	Stadium: Central Stadium; Attendance: 6,500; Referee: Ruslan Duzmambetov

17 April 2016 6	Ordabasy	1 – 0	Kairat	Shymkent
14:00 (UTC+6)	Kasalica (yellow card) 30' (goal) 54'; Tungyshbayev (yellow card) 51'; Chatto (yellow card) 90+1'	Summary	Bakayev (yellow card) 23'; Marković (yellow card) 67'; Kuat (yellow card) 85'	Stadium: Kazhymukan Munaitpasov Stadium; Attendance: 7,000; Referee: Askhat Abdanbayev

23 April 2016 7	Okzhetpes	2 – 0	Ordabasy	Astana
16:00 (UTC+6)	Chyzhov 2'; Z.Moldakaraev 3'; Ristović (yellow card) 12'; A.Kuksin (yellow card) 43'; Kozhamberdi (yellow card) 56'	Summary	Trajković (yellow card) 12'; Abdulin (yellow card) 55'	Stadium: Astana Arena; Attendance: 3,800; Referee: Denis Izmailov

1 May 2016 8	Ordabasy	1 – 0	Akzhayik	Shymkent
16:00 (UTC+6)	Tazhimbetov 72'	Summary	S.Shevtsov (yellow card) 39'; M.Sapanov (yellow card) 43' (yellow-red card) 83'	Stadium: Kazhymukan Munaitpasov Stadium; Attendance: 5,000; Referee: Akmalkhan Kholmatov

5 May 2016 9	Atyrau	2 – 2	Ordabasy	Atyrau
19:00 (UTC+6)	Korobkin (yellow card) 26'; Trytko 45+1', 86'; Konysbayev (yellow card) 57'	Summary	Kasalica 5'; B.Kozhabayev (yellow card) 32'; Narzikulov 51' (o.g.)	Stadium: Munaishy Stadium; Attendance: 2,500; Referee: Anatolyi Vishnichenko

9 May 2016 10	Ordabasy	2 – 0	Shakhter Karagandy	Shymkent
17:00 (UTC+6)	Nurgaliev 22' (pen.) (yellow card) 32'; Tungyshbayev 47'; Diakate (yellow card) 59'	Summary	Y.Tarasov (yellow card) 21'; Ubbink (yellow card) 44'; Zeneli (yellow card) 84'	Stadium: Kazhymukan Munaitpasov Stadium; Attendance: 5,000; Referee: Igor Chesnokov

14 May 2016 11	Taraz	1 – 2	Ordabasy	Taraz
18:00 (UTC+6)	V.Evstigneev (yellow card) 24'; Shakhmetov (yellow card) 76'; Mané 85'	Summary	Abdulin (yellow card) 20'; Kasalica 21', 29'; B.Kozhabayev (yellow card) 81'	Stadium: Central Stadium; Attendance: 4,300; Referee: Sergey Gorokhovodatskiy

21 May 2016 12	Astana	3 – 1	Ordabasy	Astana
16:00 (UTC+6)	Aničić 7'; Cañas 21'; Nusserbayev 72'; A.Tagybergen (yellow card) 90'	Summary	G.Suyumbaev (yellow card) 6'; Simčević 10'	Stadium: Astana Arena; Attendance: 1,700; Referee: Ruslan Duzmambetov

29 May 2016 13	Ordabasy	0 – 1	Zhetysu	Shymkent
17:00 (UTC+6)	G.Suyumbaev (yellow card) 38'; Diakate (yellow card) 44'; Tungyshbayev (yellow card) 84'	Summary	Savić 11'; S.Sagyndykov (yellow card) 34'; I.Amirseitov (yellow card) 43'; Đalović (yellow card) 44'	Stadium: Kazhymukan Munaitpasov Stadium; Attendance: 4,000; Referee: Igor Aleshin

2 June 2016 14	Tobol	1 – 0	Ordabasy	Kostanay
19:00 (UTC+6)	Zhumaskaliyev (yellow card) 13'; Kassaï (yellow card) 38'; Yavorskyi (yellow card) 43'; Khizhnichenko 58' (yellow card) 60'; Šimkovič (yellow card) 90+3'	Summary	Irismetov (yellow card) 55'; Kasalica (yellow card) 70'; Diakate (yellow card) 76'	Stadium: Central Stadium; Attendance: 4,000; Referee: Denis Tevyashov

11 June 2016 15	Ordabasy	2 – 0	Irtysh Pavlodar	Shymkent
18:00 (UTC+6)	Abdulin (yellow card) 19'; Nurgaliev 27', 59' (pen.); Gogua (yellow card) 48'; Trajković (yellow card) 51'; Tungyshbayev (yellow card) 85'; Boychenko (yellow card) 90+2'	Summary	Fonseca (yellow card) 41'; Jirsák (yellow card) 50'	Stadium: Kazhymukan Munaitpasov Stadium; Attendance: 5,000; Referee: Marat Iskakov

15 June 2016 16	Kairat	2 – 2	Ordabasy	Almaty
20:00 (UTC+6)	Arshavin (yellow card) 28'; Isael (yellow card) 39'; Marković (yellow card) 56' (goal) 85'; Gohou 68'; Islamkhan (yellow card) 72'	Summary	M.Tolebek 3'; Simčević 50'	Stadium: Central Stadium; Attendance: 9,500; Referee: Denis Izmailov

19 June 2016 17	Ordabasy	2 – 2	Okzhetpes	Shymkent
19:00 (UTC+6)	Abdulin (yellow card) 3'; Diakate 30'; G.Suyumbaev 36'	Summary	Chertov (yellow card) 17'; Buleshev 54'; Yurin 64'; S.Zhumahanov (yellow card) 75'	Stadium: Kazhymukan Munaitpasov Stadium; Attendance: 4,500; Referee: Askhat Abdanbayev

24 June 2016 18	Akzhayik	1 – 0	Ordabasy	Oral
20:00 (UTC+6)	Nikolić (yellow card) 59'; Kolunija (yellow card) 90'	Summary	Gogua (yellow card) 39'; G.Suyumbaev 42'; Tungyshbayev (yellow card) 69'	Stadium: Petr Atoyan Stadium; Attendance: 2,500; Referee: Sergey Gorokhovodatskiy

3 July 2016 19	Ordabasy	2 – 1	Atyrau	Shymkent
18:30 (UTC+6)	Gogua (yellow card) 64' (goal) 85' (pen.); Tungyshbayev 87'	Summary	Korobkin 30'; Shabalin (red card) 32'; V.Kuzmin (yellow card) 64'; Sharpar (yellow card) 66'; R.Esatov (yellow card) 70'	Stadium: Kazhymukan Munaitpasov Stadium; Attendance: 3,500; Referee: Aydin Rakhimbayev

10 July 2016 20	Shakhter Karagandy	0 – 0	Ordabasy	Karaganda
17:00 (UTC+6)	A.Nurybekov (yellow card) 33'	Summary	Mukhtarov (yellow card) 70'	Stadium: Shakhter Stadium; Attendance: 2,000; Referee: Denis Izmailov

17 July 2016 21	Ordabasy	0 – 3	Taraz	Shymkent
18:30 (UTC+6)	M.Tolebek (yellow card) 70'	Summary	Yakovlyev 4' (yellow card) 76'; A.Suley 13', 40'; D.Yevstigneyev (yellow card) 90+2'	Stadium: Kazhymukan Munaitpasov Stadium; Attendance: 3,500; Referee: Bolat Karlibayev

24 July 2016 22	Aktobe	0 – 0	Ordabasy	Aktobe
20:00 (UTC+6)	B.Kairov (yellow card) 65'; Shestakov (yellow card) 73'	Summary		Stadium: Central Stadium; Attendance: 5,200; Referee: Denis Izmailov

===== League table =====
Pos	Team	Pld	W	D	L	GF	GA	GD	Pts	Qualification
3	Irtysh Pavlodar	22	12	5	5	37	18	+19	41	Qualification for the championship round
4	Okzhetpes	22	11	4	7	33	23	+10	37	Qualification for the championship round
5	Ordabasy	22	9	6	7	26	27	−1	33	Qualification for the championship round
6	Aktobe	22	7	7	8	23	32	−9	28 (Note: Head-to-head record: Aktobe (7 points), Atyrau (5 points), Tobol (4 points).)	Qualification for the championship round
7	Atyrau	22	7	7	8	21	23	−2	28	Qualification for the relegation round

Source: UEFA.com, Soccerway
Rules for classification: 1) Points; 2) Head-to-head points; 3) Head-to-head matches won; 4) Head-to-head goal difference; 5) Head-to-head goals scored; 6) Head-to-head away goals scored; 7) Goal difference; 8) Matches won; 9) Goals scored; 10) Away goals scored; 11) Draw.

==== Championship round ====
===== Results summary =====
Overall								Home						Away					
Pld	W	D	L	GF	GA	GD	Pts	W	D	L	GF	GA	GD	W	D	L	GF	GA	GD
10	4	3	3	15	17	−2	15	3	1	1	8	6	+2	1	2	2	7	11	−4

Last updated: 31 October 2016.
Source: See Results

===== Results by round =====
Round	1	2	3	4	5	6	7	8	9	10
Ground	A	A	H	A	H	A	A	H	A	H
Result	D	L	W	W	W	L	D	D	L	W
Position	5	5	5	5	3	4	4	4	4	4

Source: See results
A = Away; H = Home; W = Win; D = Draw; L = Loss

===== Results =====
13 August 2016 1	Aktobe	4 – 4	Ordabasy	Aktobe
20:00 (UTC+6)	Shchotkin 39', 88'; A.Kakimov 45+1'; V.Kryukov (yellow card) 77' (goal) 84'; A.Abdukarimov (yellow card) 79'	Summary	Martsvaladze 16'; Geynrikh (yellow card) 55' (goal) 57' (pen.), 77' (pen.), 90+5'	Stadium: Central Stadium; Attendance: 5,150; Referee: Bagdat Abdullaev

21 August 2016 2	Astana	2 – 0	Ordabasy	Astana
19:00 (UTC+6)	Nurgaliev 2' (pen.); Twumasi 50'; Shitov (yellow card) 51'	Summary	Diakate (yellow card) 65'; Smakov (yellow card) 87'; Trajković (yellow card) 89'	Stadium: Astana Arena; Attendance: 3,000; Referee: Denis Tevyashov

26 August 2016 3	Ordabasy	2 – 1	Kairat	Shymkent
17:30 (UTC+6)	Tungyshbayev (yellow card) 40'; Geynrikh 47'; Martsvaladze 64'; Gogua (yellow card) 84'	Summary	Kuat 55'	Stadium: Kazhymukan Munaitpasov Stadium; Attendance: 4,000; Referee: Igor Chesnokov

11 September 2016 4	Irtysh Pavlodar	1 – 2	Ordabasy	Pavlodar
19:00 (UTC+6)	Aliev (yellow card) 16'; V.Li (yellow card) 29'; A.Ayaganov (yellow card) 62'; Murtazayev 70'; R.Yesimov (yellow card) 85'; Fonseca (yellow card) 85'	Summary	Gogua (yellow card) 30'; Geynrikh 41' (pen.), 45+3'; Kasalica (yellow card) 88'; M.Tolebek (yellow card) 90'	Stadium: Central Stadium; Attendance: 4,500; Referee: Sergey Gorokhovodatskiy

17 September 2016 5	Ordabasy	1 – 0	Okzhetpes	Shymkent
17:00 (UTC+6)	Geynrikh 16'; M.Tolebek (yellow card) 77'	Summary	Chyzhov (yellow card) 23'; Kislitsyn (yellow card) 30'; Nane (yellow card) 42'; Chichulin (yellow card) 80'	Stadium: Kazhymukan Munaitpasov Stadium; Attendance: 2,500; Referee: Aleksandr Gauzer

25 September 2016 6	Ordabasy	0 – 1	Astana	Shymkent
16:00 (UTC+6)	Smakov (yellow card) 69' (yellow-red card) 70'; Simčević (yellow card) 71'; Diakate (yellow card) 72'	Summary	Kabananga 44' (yellow card) 78'; Beisebekov (yellow card) 75'; Maksimović (yellow card) 79'	Stadium: Kazhymukan Munaitpasov Stadium; Attendance: 5,500; Referee: Igor Aleshin

1 October 2016 7	Kairat	1 – 1	Ordabasy	Almaty
18:00 (UTC+6)	Gohou 19'; Arzo (yellow card) 36'; Tymoshchuk (yellow card) 45+2'; G.Suyumbaev (yellow card) 90+3'	Summary	Tungyshbayev 35' (yellow card) 55'; Chatto (yellow card) 90+3'; Bekbaev (yellow card) 90+4'	Stadium: Central Stadium; Attendance: 8,500; Referee: Denis Izmailov

16 October 2016 8	Ordabasy	3 – 3	Irtysh Pavlodar	Shymkent
15:30 (UTC+6)	Trajković (yellow card) 4'; Gogua (yellow card) 18' Geynrikh 45+1' (pen.), 88' (pen.); Diakate 45+2'; Abdulin (yellow card) 57'; B.Kozhabayev (yellow card) 72'; Smakov (yellow card) 90+6'	Summary	Murtazayev 22' (pen.); Aliev (yellow card) 24'; Fonseca 27'; Kerla (yellow card) 45+1' (yellow-red card) 90+6'; Akhmetov 58' (yellow card) 68'	Stadium: Kazhymukan Munaitpasov Stadium; Attendance: 4,000; Referee: Artyom Kuchin

23 October 2016 9	Okzhetpes	3 – 0	Ordabasy	Kokshetau
15:00 (UTC+6)	Z.Moldakaraev (yellow card) 46'; S.N'Ganbe 60'; Ristović 62'; A.Kuksin (yellow card) 77'; S.Zhumahanov 90'	Summary		Stadium: Okzhetpes Stadium; Attendance: 1,500; Referee: Sergey Gorokhovodatskiy

29 October 2016 10	Ordabasy	2 – 1	Aktobe	Shymkent
15:00 (UTC+6)	M.Tolebek 40'; Simčević (yellow card) 75'; Ashirbekov (yellow card) 77'; Geynrikh 88' (pen.)	Summary	A.Kakimov 5' (yellow card) 51'; B.Kairov (yellow card) 37'; Bocharov (yellow card) 73'; Shestakov (yellow card) 90+2'	Stadium: Kazhymukan Munaitpasov Stadium; Attendance: 3,000; Referee: Aleksandr Aliyev

===== League table =====
Pos	Team	Pld	W	D	L	GF	GA	GD	Pts	Qualification
1	Astana (C)	32	23	4	5	47	21	+26	73	Qualification for the Champions League second qualifying round (Note: Astana qualified for the Europa League first qualifying round by winning the 2016 Kazakhstan Cup. However, since they already qualified for European competition based on their league position, the spot awarded to the cup winners was passed down the league.)
2	Kairat	32	22	5	5	75	30	+45	71	Qualification for the Europa League first qualifying round
3	Irtysh Pavlodar	32	14	7	11	52	36	+16	49	Qualification for the Europa League first qualifying round
4	Ordabasy	32	13	9	10	41	44	−3	48	Qualification for the Europa League first qualifying round
5	Okzhetpes	32	13	6	13	42	44	−2	45	
6	Aktobe	32	9	9	14	37	52	−15	36	

Source: Soccerway
Rules for classification: 1) Points; 2) Play-off (only if deciding champion when two teams are tied); 3) Head-to-head points; 4) Head-to-head matches won; 5) Head-to-head goal difference; 6) Head-to-head goals scored; 7) Head-to-head away goals scored; 8) Goal difference; 9) Matches won; 10) Goals scored; 11) Away goals scored; 12) Draw.
(C) Champions

=== Kazakhstan Cup ===
27 April 2016 Last 16	Ordabasy	2 – 0	Kaisar	Shymkent
16:00 (UTC+6)	Irismetov (yellow card) 49'; Junuzović (yellow card) 78'; Tazhimbetov 82' (yellow card) 82'; Tungyshbayev 90+2'	Summary	E.Altynbekov (yellow card) 45+1'; D.Suyunov (yellow card) 61'	Stadium: Kazhymukan Munaitpasov Stadium; Attendance: 4,00; Referee: Denis Tevyashov

25 May 2016 Quarterfinal	Atyrau	1 – 1 (4 – 1 p)	Ordabasy	Atyrau
19:00 (UTC+6)	Arzhanov 71'; A.Baltaev (yellow card) 80'; Essame (yellow card) 112'	Summary	Abdulin (yellow card) 72' (goal) 90+1'; Mukhtarov (yellow card) 112'; Irismetov (yellow card) 120'	Stadium: Munaishy Stadium; Attendance: 5,500; Referee: Artyom Kuchin

=== UEFA Europa League ===
==== Qualifying rounds ====
1 July 2016 First Qualifying Round 1st leg	Čukarički (Serbia)	3 – 0	(Kazakhstan) Ordabasy	Belgrade
00:30 (UTC+6)	Lagator (yellow card) 33'; Matić 49' (pen.), 68'; Kajević 53'; Janković (yellow card) 54'	Report	Mukhtarov (yellow card) 6' (yellow-red card) 29'; T.Adyrbekov (yellow card) 48'; M.Tolebek (yellow card) 58'	Stadium: Čukarički Stadium; Referee: Fábio Veríssimo (Portugal)

7 July 2016 First Qualifying Round 2nd leg	Ordabasy (Kazakhstan)	3 – 3 (3 – 6 agg.)	(Serbia) Čukarički	Shymkent
18:00 (UTC+6)	M.Tolebek (yellow card) 23'; Geynrikh 45+2' (yellow card) 60'; Tungyshbayev 67'; Erlanov 90+3'	Report	Mandić 10', 15'; Kajević 21' (yellow card) 54'; Živković (yellow card) 45+1'	Stadium: Kazhymukan Munaitpasov Stadium; Referee: Denis Scherbakov (Belarus)

== Squad statistics ==
As of Match played 29 October 2016

=== Appearances and goals ===
No.	Pos	Nat	Player	Total		Premier League		Kazakhstan Cup		UEFA Europa League	
No.	Pos	Nat	Player	Apps	Goals	Apps	Goals	Apps	Goals	Apps	Goals
1	GK	(Kazakhstan) KAZ	Almat Bekbaev	17	0	16	0	1	0	0	0
2	DF	(Kazakhstan) KAZ	Baudaulet Kozhabayev	25	0	13+9	0	2	0	0+1	0
4	DF	(Kazakhstan) KAZ	Mukhtar Mukhtarov	17	0	11+3	0	2	0	1	0
6	MF	(Nigeria) NGR	Dominic Chatto	32	0	25+4	0	1	0	2	0
8	MF	(Kazakhstan) KAZ	Bekzat Beisenov	18	0	1+13	0	2	0	0+2	0
9	FW	(Montenegro) MNE	Filip Kasalica	28	4	19+7	4	0	0	1+1	0
10	MF	(Kazakhstan) KAZ	Kairat Ashirbekov	13	0	6+5	0	1+1	0	0	0
11	FW	(Kazakhstan) KAZ	Dauren Kaykibasov	1	0	0	0	0	0	1	0
14	DF	(Kazakhstan) KAZ	Farkhadbek Irismetov	7	0	2+3	0	2	0	0	0
15	DF	(Serbia) SRB	Branislav Trajković	26	0	24	0	1	0	1	0
17	MF	(Kazakhstan) KAZ	Mardan Tolebek	31	3	19+9	3	1	0	2	0
18	DF	(Kazakhstan) KAZ	Samat Smakov	8	0	8	0	0	0	0	0
21	MF	(Kazakhstan) KAZ	Yerkebulan Tungyshbayev	31	5	24+4	3	0+1	1	2	1
22	MF	(Senegal) SEN	Abdoulaye Diakate	33	3	31	3	0	0	2	0
23	DF	(Kazakhstan) KAZ	Rinat Abdulin	28	1	25+1	0	1	1	1	0
29	GK	(Kazakhstan) KAZ	Sergey Boychenko	19	0	16	0	1	0	2	0
32	DF	(Kazakhstan) KAZ	Temirlan Erlanov	4	1	2+1	0	0	0	1	1
34	MF	(Georgia (country)) GEO	Gogita Gogua	18	1	14+2	1	0	0	1+1	0
50	MF	(Uzbekistan) UZB	Alexander Geynrikh	24	11	14+6	10	1+1	0	1+1	1
77	DF	(Kazakhstan) KAZ	Talgat Adyrbekov	14	0	6+6	0	0	0	2	0
87	DF	(Serbia) SRB	Aleksandar Simčević	32	2	27+2	2	1	0	2	0
99	FW	(Georgia (country)) GEO	Otar Martsvaladze	11	2	8+3	2	0	0	0	0
Players away from Ordabasy on loan:
7	MF	(Kazakhstan) KAZ	Azat Nurgaliev	18	6	17	6	1	0	0	0
Players who appeared for Ordabasy that left during the season:
5	DF	(Kazakhstan) KAZ	Gafurzhan Suyumbaev	17	2	15	2	1+1	0	0	0
18	FW	(Kazakhstan) KAZ	Daurenbek Tazhimbetov	9	2	0+7	1	0+2	1	0	0
28	FW	(Croatia) CRO	Edin Junuzović	13	3	8+3	3	2	0	0	0
84	FW	(Serbia) SRB	Miloš Trifunović	5	0	1+3	0	1	0	0	0

=== Goal scorers ===
Place	Position	Nation	Number	Name	Premier League	Kazakhstan Cup	UEFA Europa League	Total
1	MF	(Uzbekistan)	50	Alexander Geynrikh	10	0	1	11
2	FW	(Kazakhstan)	7	Azat Nurgaliev	6	0	0	6
3	MF	(Kazakhstan)	21	Yerkebulan Tungyshbayev	3	1	1	5
4	FW	(Montenegro)	9	Filip Kasalica	4	0	0	4
5	FW	(Croatia)	28	Edin Junuzović	3	0	0	3
5	MF	(Senegal)	22	Abdoulaye Diakate	3	0	0	3
5	MF	(Kazakhstan)	17	Mardan Tolebek	3	0	0	3
8	DF	(Serbia)	87	Aleksandar Simčević	2	0	0	2
8	DF	(Kazakhstan)	5	Gafurzhan Suyumbaev	2	0	0	2
8	DF	(Georgia (country))	99	Otar Martsvaladze	2	0	0	2
8	FW	(Kazakhstan)	18	Daurenbek Tazhimbetov	1	1	0	2
12	MF	(Georgia (country))	34	Gogita Gogua	1	0	0	1
12	DF	(Kazakhstan)	23	Rinat Abdulin	0	1	0	1
12	DF	(Kazakhstan)	32	Temirlan Erlanov	0	0	1	1
12				Own goal	1	0	0	1
				TOTALS	43	3	3	49

=== Disciplinary record ===
Number	Nation	Position	Name	Premier League		Kazakhstan Cup		UEFA Europa League		Total	
Number	Nation	Position	Name	Yellow card	Red card	Yellow card	Red card	Yellow card	Red card	Yellow card	Red card
1	(Kazakhstan)	GK	Almat Bekbaev	1	0	0	0	0	0	1	0
2	(Kazakhstan)	DF	Baudaulet Kozhabayev	5	0	0	0	0	0	5	0
4	(Kazakhstan)	DF	Mukhtar Mukhtarov	3	1	1	0	2	1	6	2
5	(Kazakhstan)	DF	Gafurzhan Suyumbaev	4	1	0	0	0	0	4	1
6	(Nigeria)	MF	Dominic Chatto	2	0	0	0	0	0	2	0
7	(Kazakhstan)	MF	Azat Nurgaliev	2	0	0	0	0	0	2	0
9	(Montenegro)	FW	Filip Kasalica	4	0	0	0	0	0	4	0
10	(Kazakhstan)	MF	Kairat Ashirbekov	1	0	0	0	0	0	1	0
14	(Kazakhstan)	DF	Farkhadbek Irismetov	1	0	2	0	0	0	3	0
15	(Serbia)	DF	Branislav Trajković	4	0	0	0	0	0	4	0
17	(Kazakhstan)	MF	Mardan Tolebek	3	0	0	0	2	0	5	0
18	(Kazakhstan)	FW	Daurenbek Tazhimbetov	0	0	1	0	0	0	1	0
18	(Kazakhstan)	DF	Samat Smakov	4	1	0	0	0	0	4	1
21	(Kazakhstan)	MF	Yerkebulan Tungyshbayev	10	1	0	0	0	0	10	1
22	(Senegal)	MF	Abdoulaye Diakate	7	0	0	0	0	0	7	0
23	(Kazakhstan)	DF	Rinat Abdulin	6	0	1	0	0	0	7	0
28	(Croatia)	FW	Edin Junuzović	1	0	1	0	0	0	2	0
29	(Kazakhstan)	GK	Sergey Boychenko	2	0	0	0	0	0	2	0
34	(Georgia (country))	MF	Gogita Gogua	6	0	0	0	0	0	6	0
50	(Uzbekistan)	MF	Alexander Geynrikh	1	0	0	0	1	0	2	0
77	(Kazakhstan)	DF	Talgat Adyrbekov	0	0	0	0	1	0	1	0
87	(Serbia)	DF	Aleksandar Simčević	3	0	0	0	0	0	3	0
			TOTALS	70	4	6	0	6	1	82	5
