= 2015 FC Ordabasy season =

FC Ordabasy
2015 season
- Chairman: Kaysar Abdraymov
- Manager: Saulius Širmelis
- Stadium: Kazhimukan Munaitpasov Stadium
- Kazakhstan Premier League: 4th
- Kazakhstan Cup: Second round vs Taraz
- Europa League: First qualifying round vs Beitar Jerusalem
- Top goalscorer: League: Yerkebulan Tungyshbayev (7); All: Yerkebulan Tungyshbayev (7)
Home colours	Away colours

The 2015 FC Ordabasy season is their 13th season in the Kazakhstan Premier League, the highest tier of association football in Kazakhstan, following their promotion from to the Kazakhstan First Division in 2003. Ordabasy will also play in the UEFA Europa League and Kazakhstan Cup.

== Squad ==
As of 5 March 2014

Note: Flags indicate national team as defined under FIFA eligibility rules; some limited exceptions apply. Players may hold more than one non-FIFA nationality.

No.	Pos.	Nation	Player
1	GK	KAZ	Samat Otarbayev
2	DF	KAZ	Baudaulet Kozhabayev
4	DF	KAZ	Mukhtar Mukhtarov
5	DF	KAZ	Gafurzhan Suyumbaev
7	MF	KAZ	Azat Nurgaliev
8	MF	KAZ	Bekzat Beisenov
10	MF	KAZ	Kairat Ashirbekov
11	FW	KAZ	Dauren Kaykibasov
12	MF	UKR	Artem Kasyanov
15	DF	SRB	Branislav Trajković
17	MF	KAZ	Mardan Tolebek
18	FW	KAZ	Daurenbek Tazhimbetov
19	DF	KAZ	Ular Zhaksybaev

No.	Pos.	Nation	Player
21	MF	KAZ	Yerkebulan Tungyshbayev
22	MF	KAZ	Rauan Sariev
23	DF	KAZ	Rinat Abdulin
25	DF	KAZ	Serhiy Malyi
26	MF	UKR	Kyrylo Petrov
28	FW	CRO	Edin Junuzović
29	GK	KAZ	Sergey Boychenko
40	FW	BIH	Ivan Božić
50	FW	UZB	Alexander Geynrikh
55	GK	KAZ	Andrei Sidelnikov
77	DF	KAZ	Talgat Adyrbekov
87	DF	SRB	Aleksandar Simčević
89	FW	KAZ	Sanjar Abdimanap

=== Reserve team ===
Note: Flags indicate national team as defined under FIFA eligibility rules; some limited exceptions apply. Players may hold more than one non-FIFA nationality.

No.	Pos.	Nation	Player
23	DF	KAZ	Daulet Duysekulov
24	GK	KAZ	Yaroslav Bondarenko
26	MF	KAZ	Kazbek Kuttybayev
27	MF	KAZ	Abzal Yeshmanov
28	GK	KAZ	Meiraly Lamayev
29	DF	KAZ	Sattarkhan Irsimbetov
30	MF	KAZ	Elmar Nabiyev
31	MF	KAZ	Gani Perdebayev
32	MF	KAZ	Nursultan Darashov
33	DF	KAZ	Auezkhan Kozhabayev
34	MF	KAZ	Shakhrur Khashimov
35	FW	KAZ	Abylaikhan Tungyshbayev

No.	Pos.	Nation	Player
36	MF	KAZ	Dias Zhanadilov
37	FW	KAZ	Irismat Tursimetov
39	MF	KAZ	Gaibilla Allashukurov
40	FW	KAZ	Alikhan Uvaliyev
41	FW	KAZ	Bekzat Zhaksybaiuly
42	DF	KAZ	Nurgisa Tursynkulov
43	DF	KAZ	Medet Kudaibergenov
44	MF	KAZ	Yeskhat Zakiyev
45	MF	KAZ	Dastan Nakipbekov
46	DF	KAZ	Serikbolsyn Turekhanov
47	FW	KAZ	Azamat Ismailov
48	MF	KAZ	Galymzhan Yermurzayev

== Transfers ==
=== Winter ===
In: Note: Flags indicate national team as defined under FIFA eligibility rules; some limited exceptions apply. Players may hold more than one non-FIFA nationality.

No.	Pos.	Nation	Player
15	DF	SRB	Branislav Trajković (from (Serbia) Partizan)
23	DF	KAZ	Rinat Abdulin (from (Kazakhstan) Atyrau)
25	DF	KAZ	Serhiy Malyi (from (Kazakhstan) Shakhter Karagandy)
26	MF	UKR	Kyrylo Petrov (from (Poland) Korona Kielce)
29	GK	KAZ	Sergey Boychenko (from (Kazakhstan) Spartak Semey)
40	FW	BIH	Ivan Božić (from (China) Beijing Baxy)
50	FW	UZB	Alexander Geynrikh (from (Uzbekistan) Lokomotiv Tashkent)
55	GK	KAZ	Andrei Sidelnikov (from (Kazakhstan) Aktobe)
87	DF	SRB	Aleksandar Simčević (from (Kazakhstan) Shakhter Karagandy)

Out: Note: Flags indicate national team as defined under FIFA eligibility rules; some limited exceptions apply. Players may hold more than one non-FIFA nationality.

No.	Pos.	Nation	Player
2	DF	BRA	Freire (loan return to (Portugal) Nacional)
6	DF	KAZ	Piraliy Aliev (from (Kazakhstan) Irtysh)
9	FW	KAZ	Sergey Gridin (to (Latvia) Spartaks Jūrmala)
11	MF	CZE	Ondřej Kúdela (to (Czech Republic) Mladá Boleslav)
14	DF	UGA	Andrew Mwesigwa
25	MF	SEN	Abdoulaye Diakate (to (Kazakhstan) Atyrau)
27	GK	KAZ	Andrei Tsvetkov
38	DF	KAZ	Ali Aliyev
39	FW	KAZ	Maksim Filchakov

=== Summer ===
In: Note: Flags indicate national team as defined under FIFA eligibility rules; some limited exceptions apply. Players may hold more than one non-FIFA nationality.

No.	Pos.	Nation	Player
28	FW	CRO	Edin Junuzović (from (Kazakhstan) Kaisar)

Out: Note: Flags indicate national team as defined under FIFA eligibility rules; some limited exceptions apply. Players may hold more than one non-FIFA nationality.

No.	Pos.	Nation	Player

== Competitions ==
=== Kazakhstan Premier League ===
==== First round ====
===== Results summary =====
Overall								Home						Away					
Pld	W	D	L	GF	GA	GD	Pts	W	D	L	GF	GA	GD	W	D	L	GF	GA	GD
22	9	8	5	21	18	+3	35	5	4	2	11	8	+3	4	4	3	10	10	0

Last updated: 28 July 2015.
Source: Soccerway

===== Results by round =====
Round	1	2	3	4	5	6	7	8	9	10	11	12	13	14	15	16	17	18	19	20	21	22
Ground	H	A	H	A	H	H	A	H	A	H	A	H	A	H	A	A	H	A	H	A	H	A
Result	D	W	W	D	W	D	D	D	W	D	W	W	D	L	W	L	L	D	W	L	W	L
Position	6	4	3	3	2	2	2	4	2	4	3	2	3	4	3	5	5	5	5	5	5	5

Source: Soccerway
A = Away; H = Home; W = Win; D = Draw; L = Loss

===== Results =====
7 March 2015 1	Ordabasy	1–1	Irtysh	Shymkent
15:00 (UTC+6)	Božić 12'; Ashirbekov (yellow card) 44'; Petrov (yellow card) 63'	Summary	Geteriev (yellow card) 34'; Gatagov 45'; Samsonov (yellow card) 69'; Chernyshov (yellow card) 73'; Azuka (yellow card) 88'; Y. Nurgaliyev (yellow card) 90+4'	Stadium: Kazhimukan Munaitpasov Stadium; Attendance: 3,000; Referee: Marat Iskakov

11 March 2015 2	Shakhter Karagandy	0–1	Ordabasy	Karaganda
16:00 (UTC+6)	Paryvaew (yellow card) 2'; Topčagić (yellow card) 39'	Summary	Simčević (yellow card) 34'; Kasyanov (yellow card) 37'; Nurgaliev (yellow card) 77'; G. Suyumbaev (yellow card) 78'; Tungyshbayev 85'; Malyi (yellow card) 90+1'	Stadium: Shakhter Stadium; Attendance: 1,000; Referee: Aydin Rakhimbayev

14 March 2015 3	Ordabasy	2–0	Atyrau	Shymkent
(UTC+6)	Petrov (yellow card) 23'; Nurgaliev 38' (yellow card) 85'; Simčević (yellow card) 58'; Tazhimbetov (yellow card) 74'; Malyi (yellow card) 81'	Summary		Stadium: Kazhimukan Munaitpasov Stadium; Attendance: 3,000; Referee: Aleksandr Aliyev

21 March 2015 4	Aktobe	0–0	Ordabasy	Aktobe
16:00 (UTC+6)	Žulpa (yellow card) 47'; A. Tagybergen (yellow card) 77'	Summary	Nurgaliev (yellow card) 44'; Tazhimbetov (yellow card) 61'; B. Beisenov (yellow card) 85'; R. Sariev (yellow card) 86'	Stadium: Central Stadium; Attendance: 3,000; Referee: Artyom Kuchin

5 April 2015 5	Ordabasy	1–0	Taraz	Shymkent
14:00 (UTC+6)	Tungyshbayev 51'; Boychenko (yellow card) 65'; Petrov (yellow card) 66'; Ashirbekov (yellow card) 90+2'	Summary	Mera (yellow card) 43'; Mukhutdinov (yellow card) 90+2'; D. Vasiljev (red card)	Stadium: Kazhimukan Munaitpasov Stadium; Attendance: 3,000; Referee: Denis Izmailov

11 April 2015 6	Ordabasy	2–2	Kairat	Shymkent
14:00 (UTC+6)	Nurgaliev (yellow card) 10'; Malyi (yellow card) 15' (goal) 28'; Tazhimbetov 42'; G. Suyumbaev (yellow card) 62'; Simčević (yellow card) 88'; Petrov (yellow card) 90+1'	Summary	Gohou 15'; V. Li (yellow card) 22'; Pliyev (yellow card) 32'; Riera (yellow card) 87'; Marković 90+3'	Stadium: Kazhimukan Munaitpasov Stadium; Attendance: 4,000; Referee: Anatoyli Vishnichenko

15 April 2015 7	Astana	1–1	Ordabasy	Astana
19:00 (UTC+6)	Postnikov (yellow card) 9'; Zhukov (yellow card) 57'; Cañas 89'	Summary	Geynrikh 10' (pen.); Ashirbekov (yellow card) 87'	Stadium: Astana Arena; Attendance: 5,000; Referee: Viktor Antonov

19 April 2015 8	Ordabasy	0–0	Kaisar	Shymkent
14:00 (UTC+6)	Abdulin (yellow card) 23'; Mukhtarov (yellow card) 25'; Tazhimbetov (yellow card) 60'	Summary	Hunt (yellow card) 25'	Stadium: Kazhimukan Munaitpasov Stadium; Attendance: 3,500; Referee: Igor Chesnokov

25 April 2015 9	Tobol	1–3	Ordabasy	Kostanay
16:00 (UTC+6)	Bugaiov 31'; I. Yurin (yellow card) 55'; O. Krasić (yellow card) 68'	Summary	Geynrikh 1'; Simčević 19'; Božić 38' (yellow card) 38'	Stadium: Central Stadium; Attendance: 3,000; Referee: Akmalkhan Kholmatov

3 May 2015 10	Ordabasy	0–0	Zhetysu	Shymkent
16:00 (UTC+6)	Božić (yellow card) 40'; Geynrikh (yellow card) 41'; Tungyshbayev (yellow card) 49'; Petrov (yellow card) 60'	Summary	S. Sagyndykov (yellow card) 40'	Stadium: Kazhimukan Munaitpasov Stadium; Attendance: 4,000; Referee: Artyom Kuchin

7 May 2015 11	Okzhetpes	0–1	Ordabasy	Astana
15:00 (UTC+6)	I. Asovskiy (yellow card) 72'; Chyzhov (yellow card) 82'; M. Tuliyev (yellow card) 90+3'	Summary	Malyi (yellow card) 7'; Kasyanov (yellow card) 18'; Geynrikh 30' (yellow card) 70'; G. Suyumbaev (yellow card) 61'; Boychenko (yellow card) 90'; R. Sariev (yellow card) 90+3'	Stadium: Astana Arena; Attendance: 1,200; Referee: Igor Aleshin

15 May 2015 11	Ordabasy	1–0	Shakhter Karagandy	Shymkent
15:00 (UTC+6)	G. Suyumbaev (yellow card) 58'; Kasyanov (yellow card) 74'; Trajković 78'	Summary	David (yellow card) 17'; E. Kostrub (yellow card) 83'; Sass (yellow card) 90+4'	Stadium: Kazhimukan Munaitpasov Stadium; Attendance: 3,000; Referee: Timur Kumashev

24 May 2015 13	Atyrau	1–1	Ordabasy	Atyrau
19:00 (UTC+6)	Tleshev (yellow card) 69'; Diakate (red card) 74'; Chichulin (yellow card) 80'; Simčević 90' (o.g.)	Summary	Nurgaliev (yellow card) 25'; Petrov (yellow card) 32'; T. Adyrbekov (yellow card) 44'; Trajković 74'	Stadium: Munaishy Stadium; Attendance: 7,500; Referee: Viktor Antonov

29 May 2015 14	Ordabasy	0–1	Aktobe	Shymkent
18:00 (UTC+6)	Tungyshbayev (yellow card) 32'; Božić (yellow card) 72'; Nurgaliev (yellow card) 81'; Ashirbekov (yellow card) 85'; Malyi (yellow card) 90+1'	Summary	A. Tagybergen (yellow card) 27'; D. Zhalmukan 49'; Logvinenko (yellow card) 62'; Khairullin (yellow card) 88'	Stadium: Kazhimukan Munaitpasov Stadium; Attendance: 4,000; Referee: Akmalkhan Kholmatov

6 June 2015 15	Taraz	0–1	Ordabasy	Taraz
19:00 (UTC+6)	D. Bashlay (yellow card) 47'; S. Zhumahanov (yellow card) 65'; Mera (yellow card) 80'; Z. Kozhamberdy (yellow card) 89'; Pyschur (yellow card) 90+4'	Summary	Tungyshbayev 5' (yellow card) 87'; Kasyanov (yellow card) 12'; Nurgaliev (yellow card) 46'	Stadium: Central Stadium; Attendance: 6,000; Referee: Ruslan Duzmambetov

20 June 2015 16	Kairat	2–1	Ordabasy	Almaty
19:30 (UTC+6)	Pliyev 35'; Islamkhan 60' (pen.); Gorman (yellow card) 70'; Isael (yellow card) 86'	Summary	Nurgaliev 32'; Malyi (yellow card) 54' (yellow-red card) 59'; G. Suyumbaev (yellow card) 87'; Božić (yellow card) 90+2'	Stadium: Central Stadium; Attendance: 9,500; Referee: Igor Aleshin

24 June 2015 17	Ordabasy	0–2	Astana	Shymkent
18:00 (UTC+6)		Summary	Twumasi 53', 73'; Akhmetov (yellow card) 66'	Stadium: Kazhimukan Munaitpasov Stadium; Attendance: 3,000; Referee: Askhat Abdanbayev

27 June 2015 18	Kaisar	1–1	Ordabasy	Kyzylorda
19:00 (UTC+6)	Junuzovic (yellow card) 45+2'; Z. Moldakaraev 59'	Summary	G. Suyumbaev (yellow card) 30'; Nurgaliev 56' (pen.); T. Adyrbekov (yellow card) 63'; Trajković (yellow card) 77'	Stadium: Gany Muratbayev Stadium; Attendance: 2,000; Referee: Aydin Rakhimbayev

5 July 2015 19	Ordabasy	2–0	Tobol	Shymkent
19:00 (UTC+6)	Trajković (yellow card) 18'; Malyi 45+2'; Petrov (yellow card) 60'; Nurgaliev 67'; Tungyshbayev (yellow card) 89'	Summary	Šimkovič (yellow card) 33'; O. Nedashkovsky (yellow card) 62'	Stadium: Kazhimukan Munaitpasov Stadium; Attendance: 2,500; Referee: Aleksandr Aliyev

12 July 2015 20	Zhetysu	3–0	Ordabasy	Taldykorgan
18:30 (UTC+6)	Savić 23' (pen.); Galiakberov 38'; S. Sagyndykov (yellow card) 75'; Turysbek 78'	Summary	T. Adyrbekov (yellow card) 77'; B. Beisenov (yellow card) 87'	Stadium: Zhetysu Stadium; Attendance: 2,000; Referee: Denis Tevyashov

19 July 2015 21	Ordabasy	2–1	Okzhetpes	Shymkent
18:00 (UTC+6)	Tungyshbayev 45'; Kasyanov 51'; Nurgaliev (yellow card) 78'; Simčević (yellow card) 84'	Summary	Pawlaw (yellow card) 41'; Rotković 53'; M. Tuliyev (yellow card) 77'; Gridin (yellow card) 81'; Chyzhov (yellow card) 85'	Stadium: Kazhimukan Munaitpasov Stadium; Attendance: 3,000; Referee: Marat Iskakov

26 July 2015 22	Irtysh	2–0	Ordabasy	Pavlodar
19:00 (UTC+6)	N'Diaye (yellow card) 17'; Dudchenko 49'; A. Ersalimov (yellow card) 68'; Roncatto 90' (pen.)	Summary	B. Beisenov (yellow card) 68'; Tungyshbayev (yellow card) 68'; Malyi (yellow card) 74'; Ashirbekov (yellow card) 80'; Geynrikh (red card) 87'	Stadium: Central Stadium; Attendance: 5,200; Referee: Aydin Rakhimbayev

===== League table =====
Pos	Team	Pld	W	D	L	GF	GA	GD	Pts	Qualification
3	Astana	22	12	7	3	40	19	+21	43	Qualification for the championship round
4	Atyrau	22	9	10	3	25	19	+6	37	Qualification for the championship round
5	Ordabasy	22	9	8	5	21	18	+3	35	Qualification for the championship round
6	Irtysh Pavlodar	22	7	9	6	26	23	+3	30	Qualification for the championship round
7	Okzhetpes	22	8	2	12	24	33	−9	26	Qualification for the relegation round

Source: UEFA.com, Soccerway
Rules for classification: 1) Points; 2) Matches won; 3) Head-to-head points; 4) Head-to-head matches won; 5) Head-to-head goal difference; 6) Head-to-head goals scored; 7) Head-to-head away goals scored; 8) Goal difference; 9) Goals scored; 10) Away goals scored; 11) Draw.

==== Championship round ====
===== Results summary =====
Overall								Home						Away					
Pld	W	D	L	GF	GA	GD	Pts	W	D	L	GF	GA	GD	W	D	L	GF	GA	GD
10	3	2	5	10	12	−2	11	1	2	2	4	5	−1	2	0	3	6	7	−1

Last updated: 9 November 2015.
Source: Soccerway

===== Results by round =====
Round	1	2	3	4	5	6	7	8	9	10
Ground	H	A	H	H	A	H	A	A	H	A
Result	D	L	L	D	W	W	L	W	L	L
Position	5	5	6	5	5	4	4	4	4	4

Source: Soccerway
A = Away; H = Home; W = Win; D = Draw; L = Loss

===== Results =====
14 August 2015 23	Ordabasy	0–0	Kairat	Shymkent
18:00 (UTC+6)	Nurgaliev (yellow card) 29'; Ashirbekov (yellow card) 45'; Tazhimbetov (yellow card) 77'; Tungyshbayev (yellow card) 86'	Summary	Zhangylyshbay (yellow card) 81'	Stadium: Kazhimukan Munaitpasov Stadium; Attendance: 3,500; Referee: Artyom Kuchin

23 August 2015 24	Aktobe	1–0	Ordabasy	Aktobe
20:30 (UTC+6)	Dmitrenko (yellow card) 26'; Deac 53' (pen.); D. Miroshnichenko (yellow card) 56'; Neco (yellow card) 63'; Logvinenko (yellow card) 83'	Summary	Geynrikh (yellow card) 23'	Stadium: Central Stadium; Attendance: 11,000; Referee: Denis Izmailov

11 September 2015 25	Ordabasy	2–3	Astana	Shymkent
17:00 (UTC+6)	Tungyshbayev 10'; Kasyanov (yellow card) 25'; Nurgaliev (yellow card) 37'; Junuzović 62'	Summary	Muzhikov 31'; Akhmetov (yellow card) 45' (yellow-red card) 65'; Kabananga 56'; Nusserbayev 90+4'	Stadium: Kazhimukan Munaitpasov Stadium; Attendance: 3,000; Referee: Viktor Antonov

20 September 2015 26	Ordabasy	1–1	Irtysh	Shymkent
17:00 (UTC+6)	Junuzović 18'; Malyi (yellow card) 31'; Petrov (yellow card) 32'; G. Suyumbaev (yellow card) 77'	Summary	Fonseca (yellow card) 59'; Roncatto 79' (pen.)	Stadium: Kazhymukan Munaitpasov Stadium; Attendance: 3,000; Referee: Artyom Kuchin

26 September 2015 27	Atyrau	1–3	Ordabasy	Atyrau
17:30 (UTC+6)	Arzhanov 16'; Grigoryev (yellow card) 60'; V. Kuzmin (yellow card) 90+4'	Summary	Simčević 30' (yellow card) 52'; Junuzović 38', 61'; Trajković (yellow card) 41'; Malyi (yellow card) 60'	Stadium: Munaishy Stadium; Attendance: 4,000; Referee: Marat Iskakov

3 October 2015 28	Ordabasy	2–1	Aktobe	Shymkent
15:00 (UTC+6)	Junuzović 39'; G. Suyumbaev (yellow card) 67'; Simčević 90+4'	Summary	Khizhnichenko (yellow card) 15' (goal) 57'; Žulpa (yellow card) 22'; Dmitrenko (yellow card) 81'	Stadium: Kazhymukan Munaitpasov Stadium; Attendance: 2,300; Referee: Askhat Abdanbayev

17 October 2015 29	Astana	2–1	Ordabasy	Astana
17:00 (UTC+6)	Malyi 19' (o.g.); Cañas 58'; Dzholchiev (yellow card) 75'; Nusserbayev (yellow card) 88'	Summary	Tungyshbayev 71'; Kasyanov (yellow card) 88'	Stadium: Astana Arena; Attendance: 3,000; Referee: Bolat Karlibayev

25 October 2015 30	Irtysh	1–2	Ordabasy	Shymkent
15:00 (UTC+6)	N'Diaye (yellow card) 23'; Roncatto 34' (pen.); Kassaï (yellow card) 90+1'	Summary	Nurgaliev (yellow card) 33'; Mukhtarov (yellow card) 56'; Simčević 57'; Tungyshbayev 59'; Petrov (yellow card) 69'	Stadium: Kazhymukan Munaitpasov Stadium; Attendance: 3,500; Referee: Ruslan Duzmambetov

31 October 2015 31	Ordabasy	0–1	Atyrau	Shymkent
15:00 (UTC+6)	Junuzović (yellow card) 39'; Petrov (yellow card) 65'; Trajković (yellow card) 73'	Summary	Arzhanov 30'; Diakate (yellow card) 55'; R. Esatov (yellow card) 75'; Chichulin (yellow card) 90+4'	Stadium: Kazhymukan Munaitpasov Stadium; Attendance: 2,500; Referee: Denis Izmailov

8 November 2015 32	Kairat	2–0	Ordabasy	Almaty
15:00 (UTC+6)	Soares (yellow card) 45'; Kuat (yellow card) 54'; Despotović 64', 83'	Summary	Petrov (yellow card) 30'; B. Kozhabayev (yellow card) 52' (yellow-red card) 62'	Stadium: Central Stadium; Attendance: 9,000; Referee: Askhat Abdanbayev

===== League table =====
Pos	Team	Pld	W	D	L	GF	GA	GD	Pts	Qualification
1	Astana (C)	32	20	7	5	55	26	+29	46	Qualification for the Champions League second qualifying round
2	Kairat	32	20	7	5	60	19	+41	45	Qualification for the Europa League first qualifying round (Note: Kairat qualified for the UEFA Europa League first qualifying round by winning the 2015 Kazakhstan Cup.)
3	Aktobe	32	15	9	8	35	25	+10	32	Qualification for the Europa League first qualifying round
4	Ordabasy	32	12	10	10	32	31	+1	29	Qualification for the Europa League first qualifying round
5	Atyrau	32	11	12	9	31	33	−2	27	
6	Irtysh Pavlodar	32	10	10	12	37	39	−2	25	

Source: Soccerway
Rules for classification: 1) Points; 2) Play-off (only if deciding champion when two teams are tied); 3) Matches won; 4) Head-to-head points; 5) Head-to-head matches won; 6) Head-to-head goal difference; 7) Head-to-head goals scored; 8) Head-to-head away goals scored; 9) Goal difference; 10) Goals scored; 11) Away goals scored; 12) Play-off (only if deciding champion when three or teams are tied); 13) Draw.
(C) Champions

=== Kazakhstan Cup ===
29 April 2015 Second round	Ordabasy	0–1	Taraz	Shymkent
17:00 (UTC+6)	Trajković (yellow card) 19'; Kozhabayev (yellow card) 27'	Report	Toktybayev (yellow card) 24' (goal) 63'; V. Evstigneev (yellow card) 53'	Stadium: Kazhimukan Munaitpasov Stadium; Attendance: 2,000; Referee: Ruslan Duzmambetov

=== UEFA Europa League ===
==== Qualifying rounds ====
2 July 2015 First qualifying round 1st leg	Ordabasy (Kazakhstan)	0–0	(Israel) Beitar Jerusalem	Shymkent, Kazakhstan
18:00 (UTC+6)	Nurgaliev (yellow card) 25'; Ashirbekov (yellow card) 34'	Report	Askling (yellow card) 37'; Klaiman (yellow card) 85'	Stadium: Kazhimukan Munaitpasov Stadium; Attendance: 11,600; Referee: Dumitru Muntean (Moldova)

9 July 2015 First qualifying round 2nd leg	Beitar Jerusalem (Israel)	2–1 (2–1 agg.)	(Kazakhstan) Ordabasy	Jerusalem, Israel
23:00 (UTC+6)	Preda (yellow card) 6'; Atzili 17'; Gabay (yellow card) 41' (goal) 60'; Nachmani (yellow card) 53'; Dasa (yellow card) 56'	Report	Adyrbekov (yellow card) 51'; Malyi (yellow card) 56'; Petrov 66'; Geynrikh (yellow card) 70'; Kasyanov (red card) 90+3'	Stadium: Teddy Stadium; Attendance: 14,000; Referee: Radek Příhoda (Czech Republic)

== Squad statistics ==
As of Match played 8 November 2015

=== Appearances and goals ===
No.	Pos	Nat	Player	Total		Premier League		Kazakhstan Cup		UEFA Europa League	
No.	Pos	Nat	Player	Apps	Goals	Apps	Goals	Apps	Goals	Apps	Goals
2	DF	(Kazakhstan) KAZ	Baudaulet Kozhabayev	12	0	4+7	0	1	0	0	0
4	DF	(Kazakhstan) KAZ	Mukhtar Mukhtarov	17	0	16+1	0	0	0	0	0
5	DF	(Kazakhstan) KAZ	Gafurzhan Suyumbaev	31	0	28+1	0	0	0	2	0
7	MF	(Kazakhstan) KAZ	Azat Nurgaliev	32	4	29+1	4	0	0	2	0
8	MF	(Kazakhstan) KAZ	Bekzat Beisenov	18	0	15+3	0	0	0	0	0
10	MF	(Kazakhstan) KAZ	Kairat Ashirbekov	29	0	9+17	0	1	0	2	0
11	FW	(Kazakhstan) KAZ	Dauren Kaykibasov	1	0	0+1	0	0	0	0	0
12	MF	(Ukraine) UKR	Artem Kasyanov	26	1	21+2	1	1	0	2	0
15	DF	(Serbia) SRB	Branislav Trajković	28	2	26+1	2	1	0	0	0
17	MF	(Kazakhstan) KAZ	Mardan Tolebek	4	0	1+1	0	1	0	0+1	0
18	FW	(Kazakhstan) KAZ	Daurenbek Tazhimbetov	20	2	7+11	2	1	0	1	0
21	MF	(Kazakhstan) KAZ	Yerkebulan Tungyshbayev	33	7	30+1	7	1	0	0+1	0
22	MF	(Kazakhstan) KAZ	Rauan Sariev	11	0	2+9	0	0	0	0	0
23	DF	(Kazakhstan) KAZ	Rinat Abdulin	20	0	12+5	0	0+1	0	2	0
25	DF	(Kazakhstan) KAZ	Serhiy Malyi	25	2	21+1	2	1	0	2	0
26	MF	(Ukraine) UKR	Kyrylo Petrov	30	1	22+5	0	1	0	0+2	1
28	FW	(Croatia) CRO	Edin Junuzović	13	5	13	5	0	0	0	0
29	GK	(Kazakhstan) KAZ	Sergey Boychenko	22	0	21	0	1	0	0	0
40	FW	(Bosnia and Herzegovina) BIH	Ivan Božić	26	2	13+11	2	0+1	0	1	0
50	FW	(Uzbekistan) UZB	Alexander Geynrikh	25	3	17+5	3	0+1	0	2	0
55	GK	(Kazakhstan) KAZ	Andrei Sidelnikov	13	0	11	0	0	0	2	0
77	DF	(Kazakhstan) KAZ	Talgat Adyrbekov	11	0	4+4	0	1	0	2	0
87	DF	(Serbia) SRB	Aleksandar Simčević	33	4	29+2	4	0	0	2	0
Players away from Ordabasy on loan:
Players who appeared for Ordabasy that left during the season:

=== Goal scorers ===
Place	Position	Nation	Number	Name	Premier League	Kazakhstan Cup	UEFA Europa League	Total
1	MF	(Kazakhstan)	21	Yerkebulan Tungyshbayev	7	0	0	7
2	MF	(Croatia)	28	Edin Junuzović	5	0	0	5
3	MF	(Kazakhstan)	7	Azat Nurgaliev	4	0	0	4
3	DF	(Serbia)	87	Aleksandar Simčević	4	0	0	4
5	FW	(Uzbekistan)	50	Alexander Geynrikh	3	0	0	3
6	FW	(Kazakhstan)	18	Daurenbek Tazhimbetov	2	0	0	2
6	FW	(Bosnia and Herzegovina)	40	Ivan Božić	2	0	0	2
6	DF	(Serbia)	15	Branislav Trajković	2	0	0	2
6	DF	(Kazakhstan)	25	Serhiy Malyi	2	0	0	2
10	MF	(Ukraine)	12	Artem Kasyanov	1	0	0	1
10	MF	(Ukraine)	26	Kyrylo Petrov	0	0	1	1
				TOTALS	32	0	1	33

=== Disciplinary record ===
Number	Nation	Position	Name	Premier League		Kazakhstan Cup		Kazakhstan Super Cup		UEFA Europa League		Total	
Number	Nation	Position	Name	Yellow card	Red card	Yellow card	Red card	Yellow card	Red card	Yellow card	Red card	Yellow card	Red card
2	(Kazakhstan)	DF	Baudaulet Kozhabayev	2	1	1	0	0	0	0	0	3	1
4	(Kazakhstan)	MF	Mukhtar Mukhtarov	2	0	0	0	0	0	0	0	2	0
5	(Kazakhstan)	DF	Gafurzhan Suyumbaev	8	0	0	0	0	0	0	0	8	0
7	(Kazakhstan)	MF	Azat Nurgaliev	11	0	0	0	0	0	1	0	12	0
8	(Kazakhstan)	MF	Bekzat Beisenov	3	0	0	0	0	0	0	0	3	0
10	(Kazakhstan)	MF	Kairat Ashirbekov	6	0	0	0	0	0	1	0	7	0
12	(Ukraine)	MF	Artem Kasyanov	6	0	0	0	0	0	0	1	6	1
15	(Serbia)	DF	Branislav Trajković	4	0	1	0	0	0	0	0	5	0
18	(Kazakhstan)	FW	Daurenbek Tazhimbetov	2	0	0	0	0	0	0	0	2	0
21	(Kazakhstan)	MF	Yerkebulan Tungyshbayev	6	0	0	0	0	0	0	0	6	0
22	(Kazakhstan)	MF	Rauan Sariev	2	0	0	0	0	0	0	0	2	0
23	(Kazakhstan)	DF	Rinat Abdulin	1	0	0	0	0	0	0	0	1	0
25	(Kazakhstan)	DF	Serhiy Malyi	10	1	0	0	0	0	1	0	11	1
26	(Ukraine)	MF	Kyrylo Petrov	11	0	0	0	0	0	0	0	11	0
28	(Croatia)	FW	Edin Junuzović	1	0	0	0	0	0	0	0	1	0
29	(Kazakhstan)	GK	Sergey Boychenko	2	0	0	0	0	0	0	0	2	0
40	(Bosnia and Herzegovina)	FW	Ivan Božić	4	0	0	0	0	0	0	0	4	0
50	(Uzbekistan)	FW	Alexander Geynrikh	3	1	0	0	0	0	1	0	4	1
77	(Kazakhstan)	DF	Talgat Adyrbekov	3	0	0	0	0	0	1	0	4	0
87	(Serbia)	DF	Aleksandar Simčević	5	0	0	0	0	0	0	0	5	0
			TOTALS	92	3	2	0	0	0	5	1	99	4
