= Edin Junuzović =

Croatian footballer (born 1986)

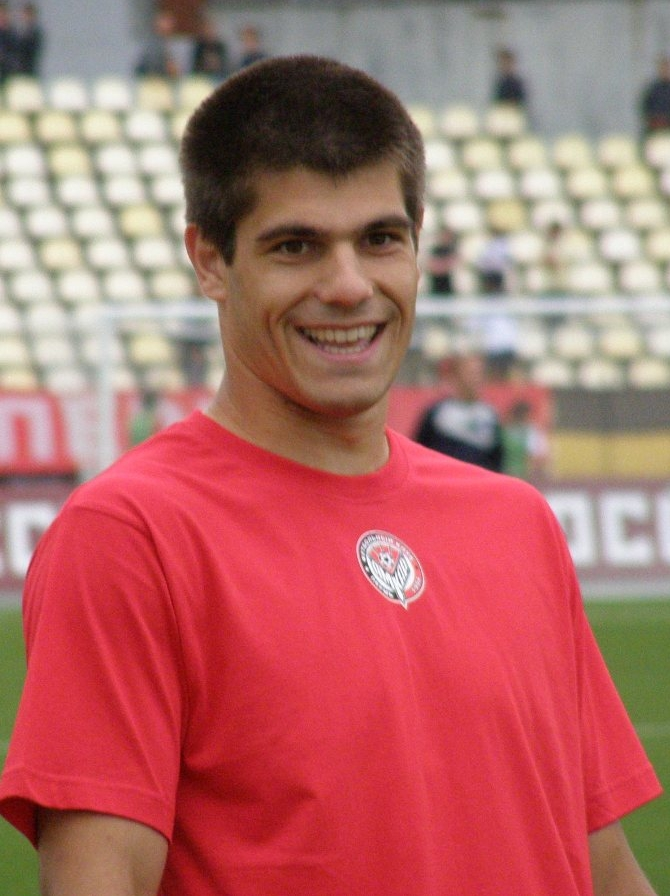
- Junuzović with Akmar in 2009

Personal information
- Date of birth: 28 April 1986 (age 40)
- Place of birth: Rijeka, SR Croatia, SFR Yugoslavia
- Height: 1.88 m (6 ft 2 in)
- Position: Forward

Youth career
- Orijent

Senior career*
Years	Team	Apps	(Gls)
2004–2006	Orijent	61	(45)
2007	Rijeka	2	(0)
2007	→ Novalja (loan)	27	(11)
2008	Krško	13	(8)
2008	Rudar Velenje	18	(13)
2009–2010	Amkar Perm	4	(0)
2010	→ Dynamo Bryansk (loan)	28	(9)
2011	Dynamo Bryansk	32	(6)
2012–2013	Zhetysu	34	(12)
2013–2014	Ordabasy	34	(13)
2014–2015	Gyeongnam	15	(2)
2015	Kaisar	16	(3)
2015–2016	Ordabasy	24	(8)
2017–2018	Rudar Velenje	9	(1)
2018–2019	Al-Mina'a		
2019	Al-Nasr		
2020	Buxoro	4	(0)
2020–2021	Opatija	24	(3)
2021	Krk	8	(6)
2022–2024	Opatija	51	(12)
- * Club domestic league appearances and goals

Edin Junuzović (Croatian pronunciation: [junǔːzoʋitɕ]; born 28 April 1986) is a Croatian former footballer who played as a forward.

== Club career ==
Junuzović played for Rijeka in the Croatian Prva HNL, Krško in the Slovenian Second League, and Rudar Velenje in the Slovenian PrvaLiga.

In July 2014, Junuzović moved from Kazakhstan Premier League side FC Ordabasy to K League Classic side Gyeongnam FC. On 6 March 2015, Junuzović returned to the Kazakhstan Premier League, signing a one-year contract with FC Kaisar.

== Career statistics ==
=== Club ===
As of 10 February 2019

Appearances and goals by club, season and competition
Club	Season	League			National Cup		Continental		Other		Total	
Club	Season	Division	Apps	Goals	Apps	Goals	Apps	Goals	Apps	Goals	Apps	Goals
Zhetysu	2012	Kazakhstan Premier League	23	8	4	0	2	0	—		29	8
Zhetysu	2013	Kazakhstan Premier League	11	4	0	0	—		—		11	4
Zhetysu	Total		34	12	4	0	2	0	—	—	40	12
Ordabasy	2013	Kazakhstan Premier League	17	8	1	0	—		—		18	8
Ordabasy	2014	Kazakhstan Premier League	17	5	1	0	—		—		18	5
Ordabasy	Total		34	13	2	0	0	0	—	—	36	13
Gyeongnam	2014	K League Classic	15	2			—		0	0	15	2
Kaisar	2015	Kazakhstan Premier League	16	3	1	1	—		—		17	4
Ordabasy	2015	Kazakhstan Premier League	13	5	0	0	0	0	—		13	5
Ordabasy	2016	Kazakhstan Premier League	11	3	2	0	0	0	—		13	3
Ordabasy	Total		24	8	2	0	0	0	—	—	26	8
Career total			123	38	9	1	2	0	0	0	134	39
