= Otar Martsvaladze =

Georgian footballer

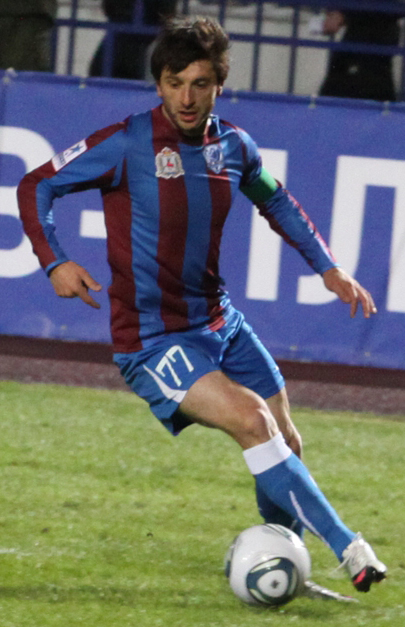
- Martsvaladze in 2011

Personal information
- Date of birth: 14 July 1984 (age 42)
- Place of birth: Tbilisi, Georgia SSR
- Height: 1.76 m (5 ft 9 in)
- Position: Striker

Youth career
- 2000–2002: WIT Georgia

Senior career*
| Years | Team | Apps | (Gls) |
| 2002–2006 | WIT Georgia | 82 | (33) |
| 2006–2008 | Dynamo Kyiv | 6 | (0) |
| 2006–2008 | Dynamo-2 Kyiv | 11 | (2) |
| 2007 | → Zakarpattia Uzhhorod (loan) | 17 | (1) |
| 2009–2010 | Anzhi Makhachkala | 22 | (13) |
| 2010 | → Volga Nizhny Novgorod (loan) | 33 | (21) |
| 2011 | Volga Nizhny Novgorod | 13 | (5) |
| 2011–2012 | Krasnodar | 22 | (3) |
| 2013 | SKA-Energiya Khabarovsk | 7 | (4) |
| 2013–2014 | Alania Vladikavkaz | 9 | (3) |
| 2014 | Dinamo Tbilisi | 14 | (6) |
| 2014–2015 | Tosno | 7 | (1) |
| 2015–2016 | Dila Gori | 27 | (19) |
| 2016–2017 | Ordabasy | 18 | (3) |
| 2017 | Dinamo Batumi | 13 | (1) |
| 2018 | Rustavi | 23 | (4) |

International career
| 2000 | Georgia U17 | 2 | (0) |
| 2001 | Georgia U19 | 3 | (2) |
| 2003–2005 | Georgia U21 | 7 | (1) |
| 2006–2014 | Georgia | 22 | (2) |
- * Club domestic league appearances and goals

Otar Martsvaladze (Georgian: ოთარ მარცვალაძე; born 14 July 1984) is a Georgian former professional footballer who played for the Georgia national team.

== Career ==
=== Club ===
Otar Martsvaladze was born in Tbilisi. He spent first four years of his professional career at WIT Georgia, where he secured championship title in 2004. Two years later Martsvaladze was named the best player of the season.

He signed for Dynamo Kyiv along with countryman Kakhaber Aladashvili in 2006.

In 2014 he returned to Umaglesi Liga and initially joined Dinamo Tbilisi for six months, followed by another year at Dila Gori. His prolific performance was duly appreciated with Otar named among the best three players of the 2014–15 season.

On 22 June 2016, Martsvaladze signed for FC Ordabasy in the Kazakhstan Premier League.

Rustavi turned out the last club Martsvaladze played for in 2018. At the age of 34 he ended his career and moved to futsal.

=== International career ===
He was also a member of Georgian national football team. Martsvaladze made his debut in the 2006 Malta International Football Tournament, he then played five games in the UEFA Euro 2008 qualifying and five more friendlies. In 2011 he assisted Levan Kobiashvili in the 90th minute in Georgia's 1–0 win against Croatia.

Otar Martsvaladze bade farewell to the national team during a ceremony held in March 2019.

== Personal life ==
His father was killed in a car crash, Otar was in the same car but received lighter injuries.

== Career statistics ==
=== Club ===
As of match played 6 July 2017

Appearances and goals by club, season and competition
| Club | Season | League | | | National Cup | | Continental | | Other | | Total | |
| Club | Season | Division | Apps | Goals | Apps | Goals | Apps | Goals | Apps | Goals | Apps | Goals |
|---|---|---|---|---|---|---|---|---|---|---|---|---|
| WIT Georgia | 2002–03 | Umaglesi Liga | 7 | 0 | | | 0 | 0 | – | | 7 | 0 |
| WIT Georgia | 2003–04 | Umaglesi Liga | 32 | 7 | | | 2 | 0 | – | | 34 | 7 |
| WIT Georgia | 2004–05 | Umaglesi Liga | 28 | 12 | | | 2 | 1 | – | | 30 | 13 |
| WIT Georgia | 2005–06 | Umaglesi Liga | 15 | 14 | | | 1 | 0 | – | | 16 | 14 |
| WIT Georgia | Total | | 82 | 33 | | | 5 | 1 | - | - | 87 | 34 |
| Dynamo Kyiv | 2005–06 | Ukrainian Premier League | 4 | 0 | | | 0 | 0 | – | | 4 | 0 |
| Dynamo Kyiv | 2006–07 | Ukrainian Premier League | 2 | 0 | | | 0 | 0 | – | | 2 | 0 |
| Dynamo Kyiv | 2007–08 | Ukrainian Premier League | 0 | 0 | | | 0 | 0 | – | | 0 | 0 |
| Dynamo Kyiv | 2008–09 | Ukrainian Premier League | 0 | 0 | | | 0 | 0 | – | | 0 | 0 |
| Dynamo Kyiv | Total | | 6 | 0 | | | 0 | 0 | - | - | 6 | 0 |
| Zakarpattia (loan) | 2007–08 | Ukrainian Premier League | 17 | 1 | | | – | | – | | 17 | 1 |
| Anzhi Makhachkala | 2009 | Russian National League | 21 | 12 | | | – | | – | | 21 | 12 |
| Anzhi Makhachkala | 2010 | Russian Premier League | 0 | 0 | 0 | 0 | – | | – | | 0 | 0 |
| Anzhi Makhachkala | Total | | 21 | 12 | | | - | - | - | - | 21 | 12 |
| Volga Nizhny Novgorod (loan) | 2010 | Russian National League | 33 | 21 | 2 | 2 | – | | – | | 35 | 23 |
| Volga Nizhny Novgorod | 2011–12 | Russian Premier League | 13 | 5 | 0 | 0 | – | | – | | 13 | 5 |
| Krasnodar | 2011–12 | Russian Premier League | 22 | 3 | 0 | 0 | – | | – | | 22 | 3 |
| SKA-Energia | 2012–13 | Russian National League | 6 | 4 | 0 | 0 | – | | 1 | 0 | 7 | 4 |
| Alania Vladikavkaz | 2013–14 | Russian National League | 9 | 3 | 0 | 0 | – | | – | | 9 | 3 |
| Dinamo Tbilisi | 2013–14 | Umaglesi Liga | 14 | 6 | 4 | 4 | 2 | 0 | – | | 20 | 8 |
| Tosno | 2014–15 | Russian National League | 7 | 1 | 0 | 0 | – | | – | | 7 | 1 |
| Dila Gori | 2015–16 | Umaglesi Liga | 27 | 19 | 2 | 0 | 2 | 0 | 1 | 0 | 32 | 19 |
| Ordabasy | 2016 | Kazakhstan Premier League | 10 | 2 | 0 | 0 | 0 | 0 | – | | 10 | 2 |
| Ordabasy | 2017 | Kazakhstan Premier League | 8 | 1 | 2 | 0 | 0 | 0 | – | | 10 | 1 |
| Ordabasy | Total | | 18 | 3 | 2 | 0 | 0 | 0 | - | - | 20 | 3 |
| Dinamo Batumi | 2017 | Umaglesi Liga | 0 | 0 | 0 | 0 | 2 | 0 | 0 | 0 | 2 | 0 |
| Career total | | | 275 | 111 | 10 | 6 | 11 | 1 | 2 | 0 | 298 | 118 |

=== International ===
As of match played 29 May 2014

Georgia national team
| Year | Apps | Goals |
|---|---|---|
| 2006 | 5 | 1 |
| 2007 | 6 | 0 |
| 2008 | 1 | 1 |
| 2009 | 1 | 0 |
| 2010 | 1 | 0 |
| 2011 | 6 | 0 |
| 2012 | 1 | 0 |
| 2013 | 0 | 0 |
| 2014 | 1 | 0 |
| Total | 22 | 2 |

=== International goals ===
As of 12 November 2015

| # | Date | Venue | Opponent | Score | Result | Competition | Ref |
|---|---|---|---|---|---|---|---|
| 1. | 28 February 2006 | Ta' Qali National Stadium, Ta' Qali, Malta | Malta | 1–0 | 2–0 | Friendly | |
| 2. | 19 November 2008 | Stadionul Dinamo, Bucharest, Romania | Romania | 1–0 | 1–2 | Friendly | |

== Honours ==
- Umaglesi Liga best player: 2005–06
- Russian First Division top scorer: 2010 (21 goals).
