= Dominic Chatto =

Nigerian football midfielder

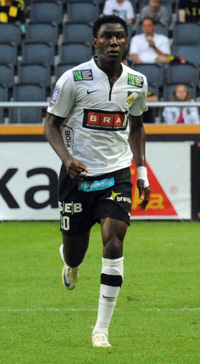

Personal information
- Full name: Dominic Chatto Bashir Jamilu
- Date of birth: 7 December 1985 (age 40)
- Place of birth: Kaduna, Nigeria
- Height: 1.81 m (5 ft 11 in)
- Position: Midfielder

Youth career
- Pepsi Football Academy
- Highlanders Football Academy

Senior career*
Years	Team	Apps	(Gls)
- Heartland FC
–2004	FC Sheraton		
2004–2006	AS Racines		
2007–2008	Inter Turku	47	(6)
2009–2013	Häcken	121	(1)
2014–2015	Bodø/Glimt	44	(3)
2016	Ordabasy	29	(0)
2017–2019	Falkenberg	28	(1)
- * Club domestic league appearances and goals

Dominic Chatto Bashir Jamilu (born 7 December 1985) is a retired Nigerian football midfielder. He has played three times in Nigerian youth teams.

== Club career ==
Chatto was born in Kaduna, Nigeria.

Chatto started playing football in the age of six. He developed into one of the most talented players of his region and was always chosen to lead his team as a captain. Chatto learned to play football in Pepsi Football Academy in Nigeria. Before moving to Nigerian Premier League and Heartland FC he trained also in Highlanders Football Academy. In the league he succeeded so well that, in 2005, he was given a tryout in Blackburn Rovers. Eventually, he did not get a work permit, because he had not played in 70 percent of national team matches. Despite this, Blackburn and Mark Hughes wanted to sign a contract and send Chatto to Cercle Brugge for a loan. Chatto refused to go to Brugge, because he would have had to wait three months to get a playing right for the Belgium league. After England, he visited Dynamo Kyiv and Brøndby IF, but did not get a contract offer. He chose to go back to Nigeria and wait for new offers from European clubs.

=== Inter Turku ===
His professional career in Europe started in 2007, when Finnish Veikkausliiga club FC Inter Turku signed him. In his first season, he was voted as the third-best player in the league and was called up to the Nigerian under-23 national team. After the season, he signed a new year-long contract with the Turku-based club. In the 2008 season, Chatto was linked with a move to Slovak FC Senec, Serbian FK Partizan and Red Star Belgrade. The owner of FC Inter refused to sell without a large transfer fee and Chatto stayed in the club. In the last match of the championship season Serie A club Atalanta B.C. was scouting Chatto. Some Russian league clubs were after him and also FC Inter offered him a new contract and was hoping to keep the player. After the season 2008, Chatto was voted for Veikkausliiga players' player of the season.

=== BK Häcken ===
In November 2008, Chatto signed a three-year contract with just promoted Swedish club BK Häcken. Häcken had to pay a transfer fee to AS Racine, which still owned his rights. The transfer negotiations started when former Finnish international Janne Saarinen contacted Chatto via Facebook.

Chatto scored a goal against IF Elfsborg in a pre-season friendly. In an interview before the Swedish season, Chatto said that Häcken were hoping for a survival in the premier division, but he hoped that they could reach a top-five place. And when the season was over, Chatto's wishes had come true, as Häcken finished in the fifth place in Allsvenskan

=== Ordabasy ===
In February 2016, Chatto signed a one-year contract with Kazakhstan Premier League side FC Ordabasy.

=== Falkenberg ===
On 10 March 2017, Chatto signed a two-year contract with Superettan side Falkenberg. On 19 December 2019, 34-year old Chatto announced his retirement.

He was brought back to Falkenberg in June 2021 as a scout and possible coach.

== International career ==
He was called up for Nigerian squad for the Intercontinental Cup in Malaysia, but did not play in the team. Chatto was near to playing in the Olympic tournament in Beijing, but would have missed about ten matches with Inter and did not make the trip.

== Career statistics ==
As of match played 29 October 2016

Appearances and goals by club, season and competition
Club	Season	League			National Cup		Continental		Total	
Club	Season	Division	Apps	Goals	Apps	Goals	Apps	Goals	Apps	Goals
BK Häcken	2009	Allsvenskan	19	0	0	0	-		19	0
BK Häcken	2010	Allsvenskan	26	1	0	0	-		26	1
BK Häcken	2011	Allsvenskan	25	0	0	0	-		25	0
BK Häcken	2012	Allsvenskan	27	0	0	0	-		27	0
BK Häcken	2013	Allsvenskan	24	0	0	0	-		24	0
BK Häcken	Total		121	1	0	0	-	-	121	0
Bodø/Glimt	2014	Tippeligaen	25	2	1	0	-		26	2
Bodø/Glimt	2015	Tippeligaen	19	1	2	0	-		21	1
Bodø/Glimt	Total		44	3	3	0	-	-	47	3
Ordabasy	2016	Kazakhstan Premier League	29	0	1	0	2	0	32	0
Falkenberg	2017	Superettan	25	1	1	1	-		26	2
Falkenberg	2018	Superettan	0	0	0	0	-		0	0
Falkenberg	Total		25	1	1	1	-	-	26	2
Career total			219	5	5	1	2	0	226	6

== Honors ==
=== Club ===
Inter Turku

  - Veikkausliiga (1): 2008
  - Finnish League Cup (1): 2008

=== Individual ===
- Veikkausliiga Player of the Year: 2008
