= Alexander Geynrikh =

Uzbek footballer

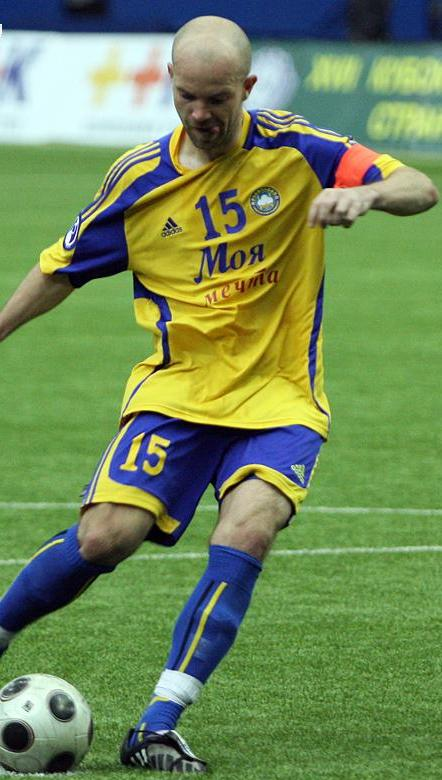
- Geynrikh in 2009

Personal information
- Full name: Alexander Rudolfovich Geynrikh
- Date of birth: 6 October 1984 (age 42)
- Place of birth: Angren, Uzbek SSR, Soviet Union
- Height: 1.83 m (6 ft 0 in)
- Positions: Striker; attacking midfielder

Senior career*
| Years | Team | Apps | (Gls) |
| 2001 | Dustlik | 12 | (0) |
| 2002 | Pakhtakor Tashkent | 23 | (9) |
| 2003–2004 | CSKA Moscow | 2 | (1) |
| 2005 | → Pakhtakor Tashkent (loan) | 12 | (5) |
| 2005–2006 | Torpedo Moscow | 21 | (0) |
| 2007–2011 | Pakhtakor Tashkent | 94 | (49) |
| 2011 | → Suwon Bluewings (loan) | 19 | (3) |
| 2012 | Emirates Club | 6 | (2) |
| 2012–2014 | Aktobe | 52 | (15) |
| 2014 | Lokomotiv Tashkent | 11 | (7) |
| 2015–2017 | Ordabasy | 58 | (13) |
| Total | | 310 | (104) |

International career^{‡}
| 2002–2017 | Uzbekistan | 98 | (31) |

Managerial career
- 2018–: Aktobe (youth coach)
- * Club domestic league appearances and goals as of 20 March 2018 ‡ National team caps and goals as of 20 March 2018

Alexander Rudolfovich Geynrikh (Russian: Александр Рудольфович Гейнрих, German: Alexander Heinrich; born 6 October 1984) is an Uzbek former footballer who played as a forward for the Uzbekistan national team.

== Career ==
After spending the first six-months of the 2005 season on loan at Pakhtakor Tashkent, Geynrikh joined Torpedo Moscow in August 2005.

On 26 February 2011, Pakhtakor Tashkent announced that Geynrikh had moved to South Korean K-League club Suwon Bluewings on a one-year loan deal. He scored on his K-League debut for Suwon, in the 2-0 opening day win over FC Seoul on 6 March 2011.

On 14 June 2012, Aktobe announced the signing of Geynrikh. Geynrikh made his debut two days later in Aktobe's 2–1 victory against Sunkar. After two years with Aktobe, Geynrikh's contract was terminated on 11 June 2014.

After leaving Lokomotiv Tashkent FK by mutual consent at the beginning of 2015, Geynrikh returned to the Kazakhstan Premier League in February of the same year, signing with FC Ordabasy.

After training with FC Aktobe at the start of the 2018 season, Geynrikh retired and became a youth coach at Aktobe in March 2018.

== Career statistics ==
=== Club ===
As of match played 5 November 2017

Appearances and goals by club, season and competition
| Club | Season | League | | | National Cup | | League Cup | | Continental | | Other | | Total | |
| Club | Season | Division | Apps | Goals | Apps | Goals | Apps | Goals | Apps | Goals | Apps | Goals | Apps | Goals |
|---|---|---|---|---|---|---|---|---|---|---|---|---|---|---|
| Dustlik | 2001 | Uzbek League | 12 | 0 | | | – | | - | | – | | 12 | 0 |
| Pakhtakor Tashkent | 2002 | Uzbek League | 23 | 9 | | | – | | | | – | | 23 | 9 |
| CSKA Moscow | 2003 | Russian Premier League | 2 | 1 | 1 | 0 | 1 | 0 | 0 | 0 | 1 | 0 | 5 | 1 |
| CSKA Moscow | 2004 | Russian Premier League | 0 | 0 | 0 | 0 | - | | 0 | 0 | - | | 0 | 0 |
| CSKA Moscow | 2005 | Russian Premier League | 0 | 0 | 0 | 0 | - | | 0 | 0 | - | | 0 | 0 |
| CSKA Moscow | Total | | 2 | 1 | 1 | 0 | 1 | 0 | 0 | 0 | 1 | 0 | 5 | 1 |
| Pakhtakor Tashkent (loan) | 2005 | Uzbek League | 12 | 5 | | | – | | | | – | | 12 | 5 |
| Torpedo Moscow | 2005 | Russian Premier League | 11 | 0 | | | - | | - | | - | | 11 | 0 |
| Torpedo Moscow | 2006 | Russian Premier League | 10 | 0 | | | - | | - | | - | | 10 | 0 |
| Torpedo Moscow | Total | | 21 | 0 | | | - | - | - | - | - | - | 21 | 0 |
| Pakhtakor Tashkent | 2007 | Uzbek League | 26 | 16 | | | – | | | | – | | 26 | 16 |
| Pakhtakor Tashkent | 2008 | Uzbek League | 25 | 12 | | | – | | | | – | | 25 | 12 |
| Pakhtakor Tashkent | 2009 | Uzbek League | 21 | 13 | | | – | | 2 | 0 | – | | 23 | 13 |
| Pakhtakor Tashkent | 2010 | Uzbek League | 22 | 11 | 1 | 1 | – | | 3 | 1 | – | | 26 | 13 |
| Pakhtakor Tashkent | Total | | 94 | 49 | | | - | - | | | - | - | 94 | 49 |
| Suwon Samsung Bluewings | 2011 | K League | 19 | 3 | 1 | 0 | – | | 3 | 0 | – | | 23 | 3 |
| Emirates Club | 2011–12 | UAE Pro-League | 6 | 2 | 1 | 1 | – | | – | | – | | 7 | 3 |
| Aktobe | 2012 | Kazakhstan Premier League | 13 | 6 | 4 | 1 | - | | 5 | 1 | - | | 22 | 8 |
| Aktobe | 2013 | Kazakhstan Premier League | 26 | 6 | 3 | 0 | - | | 7 | 1 | - | | 36 | 7 |
| Aktobe | 2014 | Kazakhstan Premier League | 13 | 3 | 2 | 0 | - | | 0 | 0 | - | | 15 | 3 |
| Aktobe | Total | | 52 | 15 | 9 | 1 | - | - | 12 | 2 | - | - | 73 | 18 |
| Lokomotiv Tashkent | 2014 | Uzbek League | 11 | 7 | 1 | 0 | – | | 0 | 0 | – | | 11 | 7 |
| Ordabasy | 2015 | Kazakhstan Premier League | 22 | 3 | 1 | 0 | - | | 2 | 0 | - | | 25 | 3 |
| Ordabasy | 2016 | Kazakhstan Premier League | 20 | 10 | 2 | 0 | - | | 2 | 1 | - | | 24 | 11 |
| Ordabasy | 2017 | Kazakhstan Premier League | 16 | 0 | 2 | 0 | - | | 0 | 0 | - | | 18 | 0 |
| Ordabasy | Total | | 58 | 13 | 5 | 0 | - | - | 4 | 1 | - | - | 67 | 14 |
| Career total | | | 310 | 104 | | | - | - | | | - | - | 310 | 104 |

=== International ===
Uzbekistan national team
| Year | Apps | Goals |
|---|---|---|
| 2002 | 2 | 0 |
| 2003 | 5 | 2 |
| 2004 | 7 | 4 |
| 2005 | 6 | 2 |
| 2006 | 6 | 2 |
| 2007 | 9 | 3 |
| 2008 | 8 | 1 |
| 2009 | 4 | 2 |
| 2010 | 7 | 4 |
| 2011 | 14 | 6 |
| 2012 | 9 | 2 |
| 2013 | 7 | 0 |
| 2014 | 0 | 0 |
| 2015 | 3 | 2 |
| 2016 | 7 | 1 |
| 2017 | 4 | 0 |
| Total | 98 | 31 |

Statistics accurate as of match played 5 September 2017

=== International goals ===
Scores and results list Uzbekistan's goal tally first.

| # | Date | Venue | Opponent | Score | Result | Competition |
|---|---|---|---|---|---|---|
| 1. | 2 April 2003 | Dinamo Stadium, Minsk, Belarus | Belarus | 2–2 | 2–2 | Friendly |
| 2. | 20 August 2003 | Skonto Stadium, Riga, Latvia | Latvia | 3–0 | 3–0 | Friendly |
| 3. | 22 July 2004 | Chengdu Longquanyi Football Stadium, Chengdu, China | Saudi Arabia | 1–0 | 1–0 | 2004 AFC Asian Cup |
| 4. | 30 July 2004 | Chengu Longquanyi Football Stadium, Chengdu, China | Bahrain | 1–0 | 2–2 (3–4 p) | 2004 AFC Asian Cup |
| 5. | 13 October 2004 | King Abdullah II Stadium, Amman, Jordan | Iraq | 2–0 | 2–1 | 2006 FIFA World Cup qualification |
| 6. | 17 November 2004 | Pakhtakor Markaziy Stadium, Tashkent, Uzbekistan | Chinese Taipei | 1–0 | 6–1 | 2006 FIFA World Cup qualification |
| 7. | 25 March 2005 | Al-Sadaqua Walsalam Stadium, Kuwait City, Kuwait | Kuwait | 1–2 | 1–2 | 2006 FIFA World Cup qualification |
| 8. | 30 March 2005 | Seoul World Cup Stadium, Seoul, Korea Republic | South Korea | 1–2 | 1–2 | 2006 FIFA World Cup qualification |
| 9. | 22 February 2006 | Pakhtakor Markaziy Stadium, Tashkent, Uzbekistan | Bangladesh | 1–0 | 5–0 | 2007 AFC Asian Cup qualification |
| 10. | 22 February 2006 | Pakhtakor Markaziy Stadium, Tashkent, Uzbekistan | Bangladesh | 4–0 | 5–0 | 2007 AFC Asian Cup qualification |
| 11. | 11 March 2007 | Kazhymukan Munaitpasiv Stadium, Astana, Kazakhstan | Kazakhstan | 1–1 | 1–1 | Friendly |
| 12. | 18 July 2007 | Shah Alam Stadium, Shah Alam, Malaysia | China | 3–0 | 3–0 | 2007 AFC Asian Cup |
| 13. | 22 August 2007 | Valeriy Lobanovskyi Dynamo Stadium, Kyiv, Ukraine | Ukraine | 1–2 | 1–2 | Friendly |
| 14. | 7 June 2008 | MHSK Stadium, Tashkent, Uzbekistan | Singapore | 1–0 | 1–0 | 2010 FIFA World Cup qualification |
| 15. | 14 November 2009 | JAR Stadium, Tashkent, Uzbekistan | Malaysia | 2–0 | 3–1 | 2011 AFC Asian Cup qualification |
| 16. | 14 November 2009 | JAR Stadium, Tashkent, Uzbekistan | Malaysia | 3–0 | 3–1 | 2011 AFC Asian Cup qualification |
| 17. | 25 May 2010 | Vazgen Sargsyan Republican Stadium, Yerevan, Armenia | Armenia | 1–3 | 1–3 | Friendly |
| 18. | 7 September 2010 | A. Le Coq Arena, Tallinn, Estonia | Estonia | 2–1 | 3–3 | Friendly |
| 19. | 12 October 2010 | Bahrain National Stadium, Manama, Bahrain | Bahrain | 2–0 | 4–2 | Friendly |
| 20. | 25 December 2010 | Zabeel Stadium, Dubai, United Arab Emirates | Bahrain | 1–0 | 1–1 | Friendly |
| 21. | 16 January 2011 | Thani bin Jassim Stadium, Doha, Qatar | China | 2–1 | 2–2 | 2011 AFC Asian Cup |
| 22. | 28 January 2011 | Jassim Bin Hamad Stadium, Doha, Qatar | South Korea | 1–3 | 2–3 | 2011 AFC Asian Cup |
| 23. | 28 January 2011 | Jassim Bin Hamad Stadium, Doha, Qatar | South Korea | 2–3 | 2–3 | 2011 AFC Asian Cup |
| 24. | 23 July 2011 | Pakhtakor Markaziy Stadium, Tashkent, Uzbekistan | Kyrgyzstan | 1–0 | 4–0 | 2014 FIFA World Cup qualification |
| 25. | 11 October 2011 | Yanggakdo Stadium, Pyongyang, North Korea | North Korea | 1–0 | 1–0 | 2014 FIFA World Cup qualification |
| 26. | 15 November 2011 | Pakhtakor Markaziy Stadium, Tashkent, Uzbekistan | Tajikistan | 3–0 | 3–0 | 2014 FIFA World Cup qualification |
| 27. | 7 September 2012 | Pakhtakor Markaziy Stadium, Tashkent, Uzbekistan | Kuwait | 2–0 | 3–0 | Friendly |
| 28. | 7 September 2012 | Pakhtakor Markaziy Stadium, Tashkent, Uzbekistan | Kuwait | 3–0 | 3–0 | Friendly |
| 29. | 3 September 2015 | Pakhtakor Markaziy Stadium, Tashkent, Uzbekistan | Yemen | 1–0 | 1–0 | 2018 FIFA World Cup qualification |
| 30. | 12 November 2015 | Pakhtakor Markaziy Stadium, Tashkent, Uzbekistan | North Korea | 2–1 | 3–1 | 2018 FIFA World Cup qualification |
| 31. | 1 September 2016 | Bunyodkor Stadium, Tashkent, Uzbekistan | Syria | 1–0 | 1–0 | 2018 FIFA World Cup qualification |
Correct as of 25 August 2017

== Honours ==
=== Club ===
CSKA Moscow

- Russian Premier League champion: (1) 2003

Pakhtakor Tashkent

- Uzbek League champion: (3) 2002, 2005, 2007
- Uzbek Cup winner: (3) 2002, 2005, 2007

Suwon Bluewings

- Korean FA Cup runner-up: (1) 2011

Aktobe

- Kazakhstan Premier League champion: (1) 2013
- Kazakhstan Super Cup (1): 2014

=== International ===
- AFC Asian Cup 4th: 2011

=== Individual ===
- Uzbekistan Player of the Year : 2002
- Uzbekistan Player of the Year 2nd (2): 2004, 2006
