= Yerkebulan Tungyshbayev =

Kazakhstani footballer (born 1995)

Personal information
- Full name: Yerkebulan Muratuly Tungyshbayev
- Date of birth: 14 January 1995 (age 31)
- Place of birth: Shymkent, Kazakhstan
- Height: 1.83 m (6 ft 0 in)
- Position: Midfielder

Team information
- Current team: Turan
- Number: 21

Senior career*
Years	Team	Apps	(Gls)
2013–2019	Ordabasy	139	(21)
2013	→ Kyran (loan)	26	(6)
2019–2021	Kairat	24	(0)
2021–2022	Ordabasy	19	(4)
2022–2023	Aksu	25	(8)
2023–2025	Ordabasy	53	(6)
2025	Irtysh Pavlodar	11	(9)
2026–	Turan	1	(0)

International career^{‡}
2016–	Kazakhstan	11	(1)
- * Club domestic league appearances and goals as of 2 November 2026 ‡ National team caps and goals as of 17 April 2023

Yerkebulan Muratuly Tungyshbayev (Kazakh: Еркебұлан Мұратұлы Тұңғышбаев, Erkebūlan Mūratūly Tūñğyşbaev; born 14 January 1995) is a Kazakh footballer who plays as a midfielder for Turan in the Kazakhstan First League.

== Career ==
=== Club ===
Tungyshbayev started his career in the youth team of FC Ordabasy before joining FC Kyran on loan for the 2013 season. On 7 January 2019, Tungyshbayev moved to FC Kairat, signing a three-year contract.

On 12 March 2021, Tungyshbayev returned to Ordabasy.

== Career statistics ==
=== Club ===
As of match played 16 April 2023

Appearances and goals by club, season and competition
Club	Season	League			National Cup		Continental		Other		Total	
Club	Season	Division	Apps	Goals	Apps	Goals	Apps	Goals	Apps	Goals	Apps	Goals
Ordabasy	2013	Premier League	0	0	0	0	–		–		0	0
Ordabasy	2014	Premier League	19	1	2	0	–		–		21	1
Ordabasy	2015	Premier League	31	7	1	0	1	0	–		33	7
Ordabasy	2016	Premier League	28	3	1	1	2	0	–		31	4
Ordabasy	2017	Premier League	29	5	4	0	2	0	–		35	5
Ordabasy	2018	Premier League	32	5	2	0	0	0	–		34	5
Ordabasy	Total		139	21	10	1	5	0	-	-	154	22
Kyran (loan)	2013	First Division	26	6			–		–		26	6
Kairat	2019	Kazakhstan Premier League	14	0	1	0	0	0	1	0	16	0
Kairat	2020	Kazakhstan Premier League	10	0	0	0	1	0	-		11	0
Kairat	2021	Kazakhstan Premier League	0	0	0	0	0	0	0	0	0	0
Kairat	Total		24	0	1	0	1	0	1	0	27	0
Ordabasy	2021	Kazakhstan Premier League	19	4	0	0	-		-		19	4
Aksu	2022	Kazakhstan Premier League	25	8	3	0	-		-		28	8
Ordabasy	2023	Kazakhstan Premier League	5	0	0	0	-		1	1	6	1
Career total			238	39	14	1	6	0	2	1	260	41

=== International ===
Kazakhstan
Year	Apps	Goals
2016	1	0
2017	4	0
2018	5	1
Total	10	1

Statistics accurate as of match played 15 November 2018

=== International goals ===
As of match played 26 March 2018
Scores and results list Kazakhstan's goal tally first.

#	Date	Venue	Opponent	Score	Result	Competition	Ref
1.	26 March 2018	Pancho Aréna, Felcsút, Hungary	Bulgaria	1–1	1–2	Friendly	
