= Azat Nurgaliyev =

Kazakhstani footballer (born 1986)

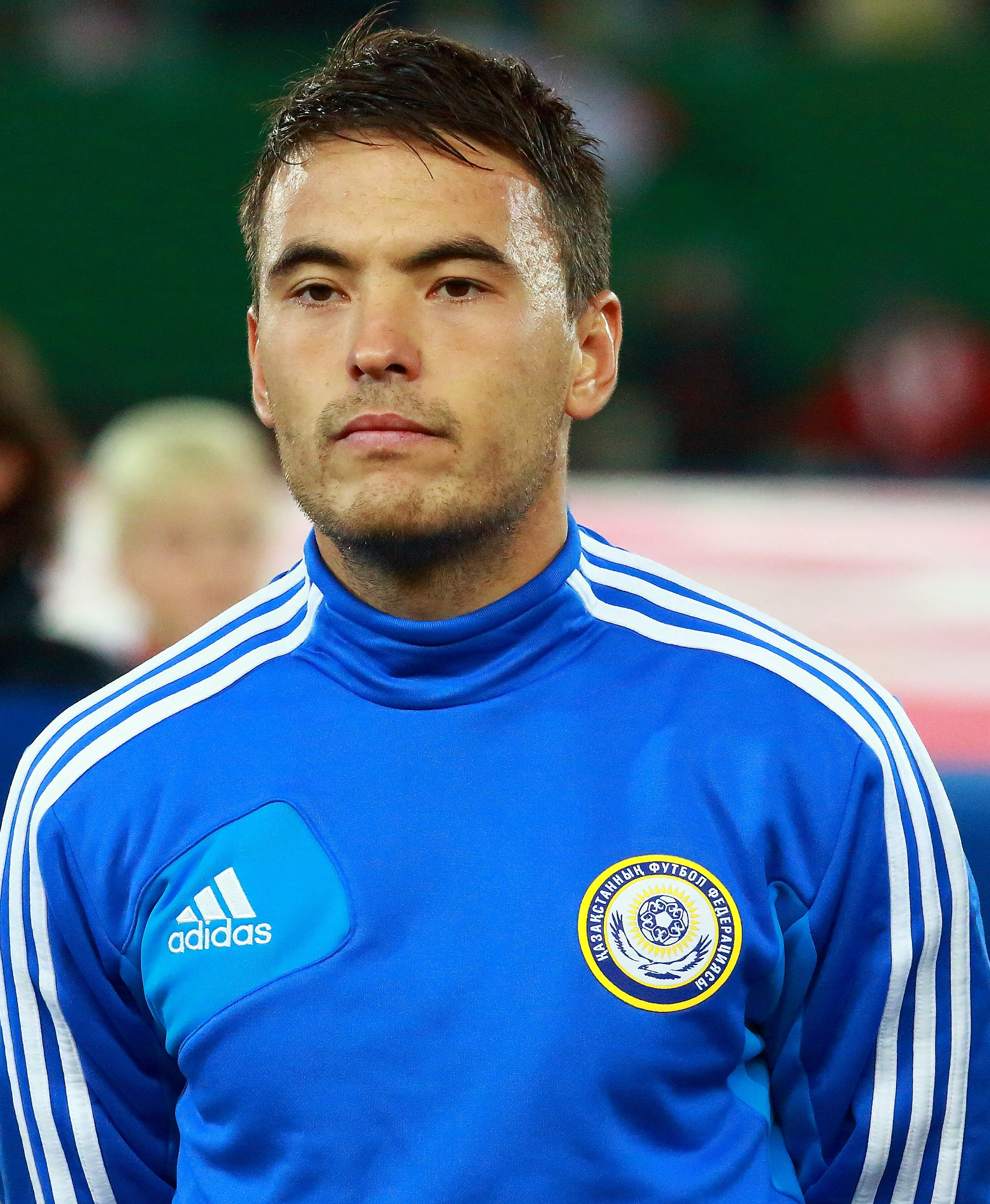

Personal information
- Full name: Azat Malikuly Nurgaliyev
- Date of birth: 30 June 1986 (age 40)
- Place of birth: Shymkent, Kazakh SSR, Soviet Union
- Height: 1.74 m (5 ft 8 1/2 in)
- Position: Attacking midfielder

Senior career*
Years	Team	Apps	(Gls)
2004–2005	Ordabasy	46	(1)
2005–2010	Tobol	123	(20)
2011	Ordabasy	29	(3)
2012	Zhetysu	9	(4)
2012	Zhetysu-Sunkar	9	(2)
2013–2017	Ordabasy	130	(24)
2016	→ Astana (loan)	11	(6)
2018–2021	Tobol	104	(30)

International career^{‡}
2003	Kazakhstan U17	3	(0)
2005	Kazakhstan U19	3	(0)
2006–2008	Kazakhstan U21	7	(2)
2009–	Kazakhstan	44	(3)
- * Club domestic league appearances and goals as of 5 January 2022 ‡ National team caps and goals as of 5 January 2022

Azat Malikuly Nurgaliyev (Kazakh: Азат Мәлікұлы Нұрғалиев, Azat Mälıkūly Nūrğaliev; born 30 June 1986) is a Kazakh professional footballer who last played for FC Tobol as a midfielder.

== Career ==
=== Club ===
The pupil of the Shymkent football. The first professional club FC Ordabasy was his hometown. Later he moved to FC Tobol. In one of the seasons on Nurgaliyev claimed the champion of Kazakhstan FC Aktobe. In 2011, he returned to his native FC Ordabasy and that same year won with the Kazakhstan Cup team in 2011.

On 23 June 2016, Nurgaliyev joined FC Astana on loan for the remainder of the season, with a view to a permanent move.

On 17 January 2018, FC Tobol announced the signing of Nurgaliyev. Nurgaliyev, signed a new one-year contract with Tobol on 14 December 2018.

On 2 January 2022, Tobol announced that Nurgaliyev had left the club after his contract had expired.

=== International ===
Nurgaliyev has been representing the national team of Kazakhstan since 2009.

== Career statistics ==
=== Club ===
As of match played 30 October 2021

Appearances and goals by club, season and competition
Club	Season	League			National Cup		Continental		Other		Total	
Club	Season	Division	Apps	Goals	Apps	Goals	Apps	Goals	Apps	Goals	Apps	Goals
Aksu-Kent	2003	Kazakhstan First Division	11	2			–		–		11	2
Ordabasy-2	2004	Kazakhstan First Division	3	3			–		–		3	3
Ordabasy	2004	Kazakhstan Premier League	20	1			–		–		20	1
Ordabasy	2005	Kazakhstan Premier League	26	0	4	0	–		–		30	0
Ordabasy	Total		46	1	4	0	-	-	-	-	50	1
Tobol	2006	Kazakhstan Premier League	26	2	1	0	2 (Note: Appearances in the UEFA CUP)	0	–		29	2
Tobol	2007	Kazakhstan Premier League	28	2	3	0	8 (Note: Six appearances in the UEFA Intertoto Cup, and two appearances in the UEFA CUP)	0	–		39	2
Tobol	2008	Kazakhstan Premier League	20	8	4	1	2	0	–		26	9
Tobol	2009	Kazakhstan Premier League	23	5	3	0	2 (Note: Appearances and goals in the UEFA Europa League)	0	–		28	5
Tobol	2010	Kazakhstan Premier League	26	3	0	0	2	0	–		28	3
Tobol	Total		123	20	11	1	16	0	-	-	150	21
Ordabasy	2011	Kazakhstan Premier League	29	3	6	1	–		–		35	7
Zhetysu	2012	Kazakhstan Premier League	9	4	0	0	–		–		9	4
Sunkar	2012	Kazakhstan Premier League	9	2	0	0	–		–		9	2
Ordabasy	2013	Kazakhstan Premier League	28	4	1	0	-		-		29	4
Ordabasy	2014	Kazakhstan Premier League	27	5	1	0	-		-		28	5
Ordabasy	2015	Kazakhstan Premier League	30	4	0	0	2	0	-		32	4
Ordabasy	2016	Kazakhstan Premier League	17	6	1	0	-		-		18	6
Ordabasy	2017	Kazakhstan Premier League	28	5	2	0	2	0	-		32	5
Ordabasy	Total		130	24	6	0	4	0	-	-	140	24
Astana (loan)	2016	Kazakhstan Premier League	11	6	1	0	6 (Note: Two appearances in the UEFA Champions League, and four appearances and one goal in the UEFA Europa League)	1	–		18	7
Tobol	2018	Kazakhstan Premier League	28	8	0	0	4	1	–		32	9
Tobol	2019	Kazakhstan Premier League	32	10	3	2	2	0	–		37	12
Tobol	2020	Kazakhstan Premier League	19	5	0	0	–		–		19	5
Tobol	2021	Kazakhstan Premier League	25	7	4	0	3 (Note: Appearances in the UEFA Europa Conference League)	0	2 (Note: Appearances in the Kazakhstan Super Cup)	0	34	7
Tobol	Total		104	30	7	2	9	1	2	0	122	33
Career total			475	95	35	4	35	2	2	0	548	104

=== International ===
Kazakhstan national team
Year	Apps	Goals
2009	3	0
2010	6	0
2011	3	0
2012	2	0
2013	1	0
2014	7	1
2015	4	0
2016	7	2
2017	6	0
2018	0	0
2019	1	0
2020	0	0
2021	4	0
Total	44	3

Statistics accurate as of match played 1 September 2021

=== International goals ===
As of match played 7 June 2016. Kazakhstan score listed first, score column indicates score after each Nurgaliev goal.

International goals by date, venue, cap, opponent, score, result and competition
No.	Date	Venue	Cap	Opponent	Score	Result	Competition
1	5 September 2014	Astana Arena, Astana, Kazakhstan	18	Kyrgyzstan	7–1	7–1	Friendly
2	29 March 2016	Boris Paichadze Dinamo Arena, Tbilisi, Georgia	28	Georgia	1–0	1–1	Friendly
3	7 June 2016	Dalian Sports Center Stadium, Dalian, China	29	China	1–0	1–0	Friendly
