= Mukhtar Mukhtarov =

Kazakhstani footballer

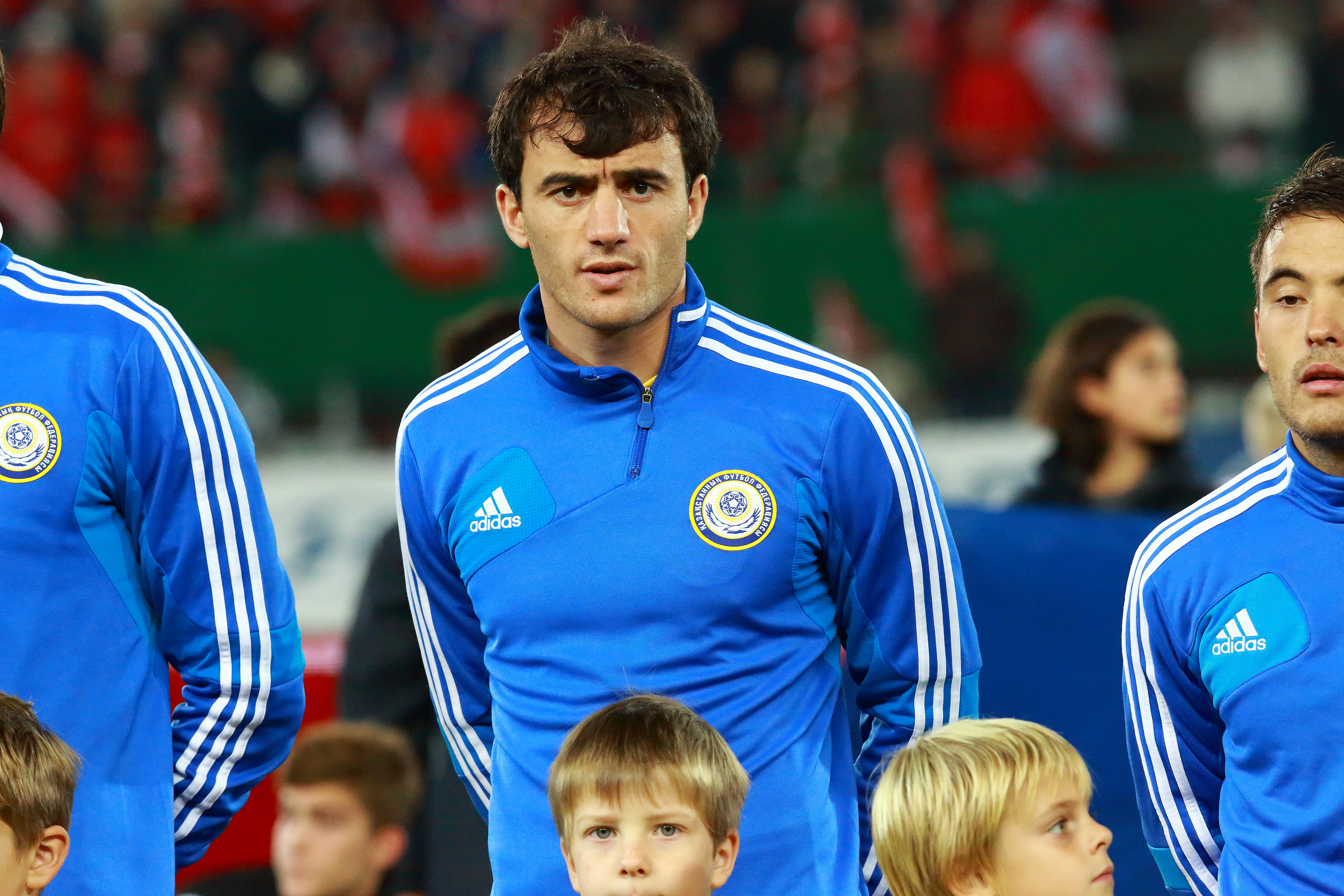

Personal information
- Full name: Mukhtar Badirkhanovich Mukhtarov
- Date of birth: 6 January 1986 (age 40)
- Place of birth: Shymkent, Kazakh SSR, Soviet Union
- Height: 1.88 m (6 ft 2 in)
- Position: Centre back

Senior career*
| Years | Team | Apps | (Gls) |
| 2004–2011 | Ordabasy | 124 | (7) |
| 2011–2012 | Astana | 11 | (0) |
| 2012–2017 | Ordabasy | 87 | (0) |

International career
| 2005–2006 | Kazakhstan U-21 | 6 | (0) |
| 2006–2013 | Kazakhstan | 15 | (0) |
- * Club domestic league appearances and goals

Mukhtar Badirkhanovich Mukhtarov (Kazakh: Мұхтар Бадірханұлы Мұхтаров; born 6 January 1986) is a Kazakh former footballer of Azeri and Turkish roots who played as a centre back.

== Early and personal life ==
Mukhtar was born in Shymkent, Kazakh SSR, to parents originating from the city of Lənkəran, present-day Azerbaijan. He has some Turkish roots as well, his great-grandfather originating from Istanbul.

== Club career stats ==
Last update: 8 November 2017

| Club | Season | League | | Cup | | Europe | | Total | |
| Club | Season | Apps | Goals | Apps | Goals | Apps | Goals | Apps | Goals |
|---|---|---|---|---|---|---|---|---|---|
| Ordabasy-2 | 2004 | 20 | 1 | 3 | 1 | - | - | 23 | 2 |
| Ordabasy | 2004 | 1 | 0 | 0 | 0 | - | - | 1 | 0 |
| Ordabasy | 2005 | 21 | 0 | 3 | 0 | - | - | 24 | 0 |
| Ordabasy | 2006 | 14 | 1 | 1 | 0 | - | - | 15 | 1 |
| Ordabasy | 2007 | 3 | 0 | 1 | 0 | - | - | 4 | 0 |
| Ordabasy | 2008 | 12 | 0 | 2 | 0 | - | - | 14 | 0 |
| Ordabasy | 2009 | 19 | 2 | 3 | 1 | - | - | 22 | 3 |
| Ordabasy | 2010 | 25 | 1 | 3 | 0 | - | - | 28 | 1 |
| Ordabasy | 2011 | 28 | 3 | 4 | 1 | - | - | 32 | 4 |
| Astana | 2012 | 11 | 0 | 1 | 1 | - | - | 12 | 1 |
| Ordabasy | 2012 | 9 | 0 | 2 | 0 | 2 | 0 | 13 | 0 |
| Ordabasy | 2013 | 25 | 0 | 2 | 1 | - | - | 27 | 1 |
| Ordabasy | 2014 | 21 | 0 | 2 | 0 | - | - | 23 | 0 |
| Ordabasy | 2015 | 17 | 0 | 0 | 0 | 0 | 0 | 17 | 0 |
| Ordabasy | 2016 | 14 | 0 | 2 | 0 | 1 | 0 | 17 | 0 |
| Ordabasy | 2016 | 2 | 0 | 0 | 0 | 0 | 0 | 2 | 0 |
| Career Total | | 242 | 8 | 29 | 5 | 3 | 0 | 274 | 13 |
