= Sergey Boychenko =

Kazakhstan footballer

Personal information
- Date of birth: September 27, 1977 (age 49)
- Place of birth: Kazakhstan
- Height: 1.86 m (6 ft 1 in)
- Position: Goalkeeper

Team information
- Current team: Aktobe (GK coach)

Senior career*
Years	Team	Apps	(Gls)
1995–2003	FC Spartak Semey	77	(0)
1997	→ Kairat (loan)	6	(0)
2001	→ Vostok (loan)	20	(0)
2004–2006	Kairat	42	(0)
2006–2008	Astana	53	(0)
2009–2011	Aktobe	8	(0)
2012–2013	Atyrau	38	(0)
2014	Spartak Semey	13	(0)
2015–2017	Ordabasy	37	(0)

International career
2004	Kazakhstan	3	(0)

Managerial career
- 2020–2021: Atyrau (GK coach)
- 2021: Makhtaaral (GK coach)
- 2021–: Aktobe (GK coach)
- * Club domestic league appearances and goals

Sergey Boychenko (born 27 September 1977) is a Kazakhstan football coach and a former goalkeeper. He works as a goalkeeping coach with Aktobe.

== Club career ==
He started his career at FC Spartak Semey.
