= Renat Abdulin =

Kazakh footballer

Personal information
- Full name: Renat Footovich Abdulin
- Date of birth: 14 April 1982 (age 44)
- Place of birth: Alma-Ata, Soviet Union
- Height: 1.86 m (6 ft 1 in)
- Position: Centre back

Senior career*
Years	Team	Apps	(Gls)
1999–2008	Kairat Almaty	144	(6)
2009–2010	Lokomotiv Astana	16	(1)
2010	Tobol	10	(0)
2011	Vostok	26	(1)
2012	Kaisar	25	(0)
2013	Ordabasy	7	(0)
2013–2014	Atyrau	48	(2)
2015–2017	Ordabasy	47	(0)
2017–2019	Okzhetpes	54	(1)
Total		377	(11)

International career
2002–2016	Kazakhstan	26	(2)
- * Club domestic league appearances and goals

Renat Footovich Abdulin (Russian: Ренат Фоотович Абдулин; born 14 April 1982) is a Kazakh retired footballer.

== Career ==
Abdulin has previously played for Kairat Almaty.

On 15 June 2017, Abdulin moved from FC Ordabasy to FC Okzhetpes. He retired at the end of 2019.

== International career ==
He scored his first goal for Kazakhstan on 1 April 2009 in a 5–1 defeat to Belarus in a World Cup qualifying match. In his next appearance, he fouled England striker Emile Heskey to concede a penalty in a 4–0 defeat.

Even so, he created a shock in UEFA Euro 2016 qualifying by scoring the goal to take the lead over the World Cup's eventual third place team Netherlands in the Amsterdam ArenA. Kazakhstan eventually lost 1–3, but it marked for the first time ever a Central Asian side had taken the lead over the world's strongest teams.

=== International goals ===
#	Date	Venue	Opponent	Score	Result	Competition
1.	1 April 2009	Almaty Central Stadium, Almaty, Kazakhstan	Belarus	1–0	1–5	2010 FIFA World Cup qual.
2.	10 October 2014	Amsterdam ArenA, Amsterdam, Netherlands	Netherlands	0–1	3–1	UEFA Euro 2016 qual.
Correct as of 13 January 2017
