= Kairat Ashirbekov =

Kazakhstani footballer

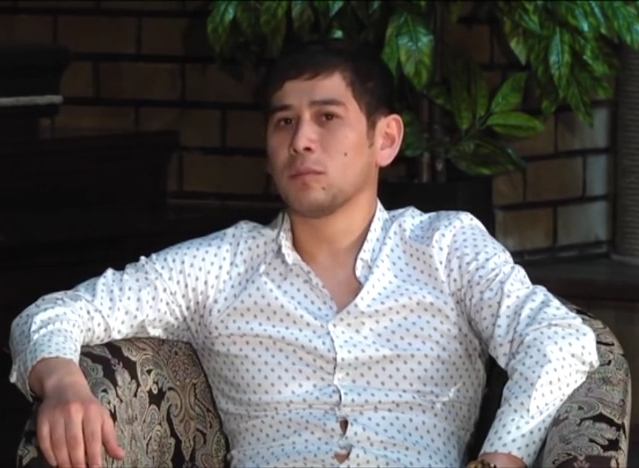
- Ashirbekov in 2016

Personal information
- Full name: Kairat Ashirbekov
- Date of birth: 21 October 1982 (age 44)
- Place of birth: Shymkent, Soviet Union, Kazakh SSR
- Height: 1.72 m (5 ft 7 1/2 in)
- Position: Midfielder

Team information
- Current team: Ordabasy (sporting director)

Senior career*
Years	Team	Apps	(Gls)
1999	FC Sintez	0	(0)
2000	FC Dostyk	18	(2)
2001	Taraz	28	(0)
2002–2007	Aktobe	141	(37)
2008	Shakhter Karagandy	29	(9)
2009	Lokomotiv Astana	11	(2)
2010–2019	Ordabasy	185	(16)

International career
2006–2008	Kazakhstan	16	(2)

Managerial career
- 2019–: FC Ordabasy (sporting director)
- * Club domestic league appearances and goals

Kairat Ashirbekov (Kazakh: Қайрат Әшірбеков) is a Kazakhstani football official and a former player who played as a midfielder. He works as a sporting director for FC Ordabasy.

== International career ==
His national team debut was on 7 July 2006 against Tajikistan in a friendly match.

== Career statistics ==
=== Club statistics ===
Last update: 10 February 2009

Season	Team	Country	League	Level	Apps	Goals
1999	Sintez	Kazakhstan	Premier League	1	0	
2000	Dostyk	Kazakhstan	Premier League	1	18	2
2001	Taraz	Kazakhstan	Premier League	1	28	
2002	Aktobe	Kazakhstan	Premier League	1	26	3
2003	Aktobe	Kazakhstan	Premier League	1	30	4
2004	Aktobe	Kazakhstan	Premier League	1	22	10
2005	Aktobe	Kazakhstan	Premier League	1	25	15
2006	Aktobe	Kazakhstan	Premier League	1	17	3
2007	Aktobe	Kazakhstan	Premier League	1	21	2
2008	Shakhter	Kazakhstan	Premier League	1	27	9
2009	Lokomotiv Astana	Kazakhstan	Premier League	1		

=== International goals ===
#	Date	Venue	Opponent	Score	Result	Competition
1.	28 December 2006	Suphachalasai Stadium, Bangkok, Thailand	Thailand	2–2	Draw	2006 King's Cup
2.	24 March 2007	Central Stadium, Almaty, Kazakhstan	Serbia	2–1	Win	EURO 2008 Qual.
Correct as of 2 January 2017
