= Branislav Trajković =

Serbian footballer (born 1989)

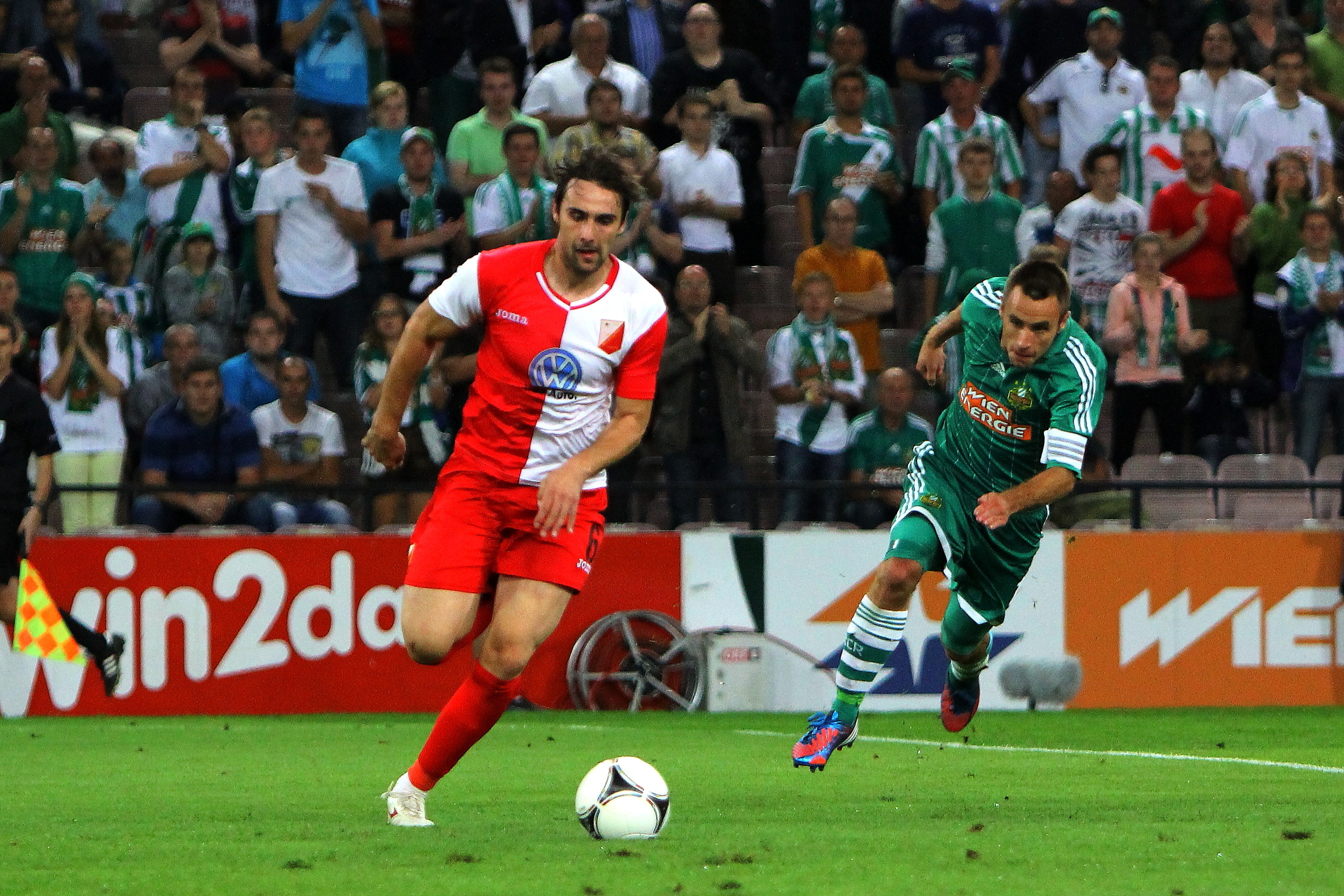
- Trajković (left) with Vojvodina against Rapid Wien in 2012

Personal information
- Full name: Branislav Trajković
- Date of birth: 29 August 1989 (age 37)
- Place of birth: Odžaci, SFR Yugoslavia
- Height: 1.90 m (6 ft 3 in)
- Position: Centre-back

Team information
- Current team: Borac Starčevo

Senior career*
Years	Team	Apps	(Gls)
2005–2010	Hajduk Kula	71	(0)
2005–2007	→ POFK Kula (loan)	39	(0)
2007	→ Radnički Sombor (loan)	11	(1)
2010–2013	Vojvodina	71	(3)
2014	Partizan	11	(0)
2015–2017	Ordabasy	53	(2)
2017–2018	Zemun	21	(0)
2019	Isloch Minsk Raion	0	(0)
2020	Rabotnički	18	(0)
2021–2022	Radnički Beograd	7	(0)
2023–2024	Ušće Novi Beograd		
2024-	Borac Starčevo		

International career
2013	Serbia	1	(0)
- * Club domestic league appearances and goals as of 31 December 2020

Branislav Trajković (Serbian Cyrillic: Бранислав Трајковић; born 29 August 1989) is a Serbian footballer who plays as a centre-back for Borac Starčevo.

== Club career ==
=== Early career ===
Having been a well-known talent in his teenage years, Trajković made his professional debut for Hajduk Kula at the age of 16 in 2005. From 2005 to 2007 he was loaned out to lower-tier teams Radnički Sombor and POFK Kula. From 2008 he played regularly for Hajduk Kula, becoming a regular starter and gained a reputation as the core centre-back of the entire team.

=== Vojvodina ===
Trajković signed for Vojvodina in August 2010. From the beginning of the 2011-12 season he became captain of FK Vojvodina thanks to his reputation as one of the best center-backs playing in the entire league. By the summer of 2012 Trajković had attracted interest from Trabzonspor and S.S. Lazio. On 30 January 2013, despite an offer to sign for Udinese Calcio, Trajković decided to stay with FK Vojvodina in an attempt to be the first captain to lead the team to win the Serbian Cup. In 2013, he began starting games as team captain with greater frequency.

=== Partizan ===
On 11 January 2014, after turning down a lucrative offer from Antalyaspor, Trajković signed with Partizan, where he was re-united with coach Marko Nikolić who had previously coached FK Vojvodina. The transfer was just one part of a large controversy on Vojvodina's winter transactions to Partizan in 2014, which caused uproar and severe criticism of football fans and sports journalists.

=== Zemun ===
After being without a club for a year, Trajković signed with Zemun on the last day of the summer transfer window 2017 as a single player. He made his debut against Red Star Belgrade on 29 October. On 5 March 2018, it was announced Trajković earned a leg fracture in a match played two days before. Previously, he had been substituted out in 53 minute of game against Javor Ivanjica, being replaced with Slobodan Vuković in 2–0 home defeat.

=== Isloch ===
On 30 March 2019, Trajković joined Isloch Minsk Raion. He played one game for the reserve team and was only on the bench for the first team one time, before the club announced on 4 June 2019, that his contract had been terminated by mutual consent.

== International career ==
Trajković was called up for the Serbia national team ahead of the friendly match against Cyprus national football team on 6 February 2013, but did not make his debut in that game. He finally made his debut for the national team on 15 October 2013, in a match against Macedonia.

== Career statistics ==
=== International ===
Serbia national team
Year	Apps	Goals
2013	1	0
Total	1	0
