= Artem Kasyanov =

Ukrainian footballer

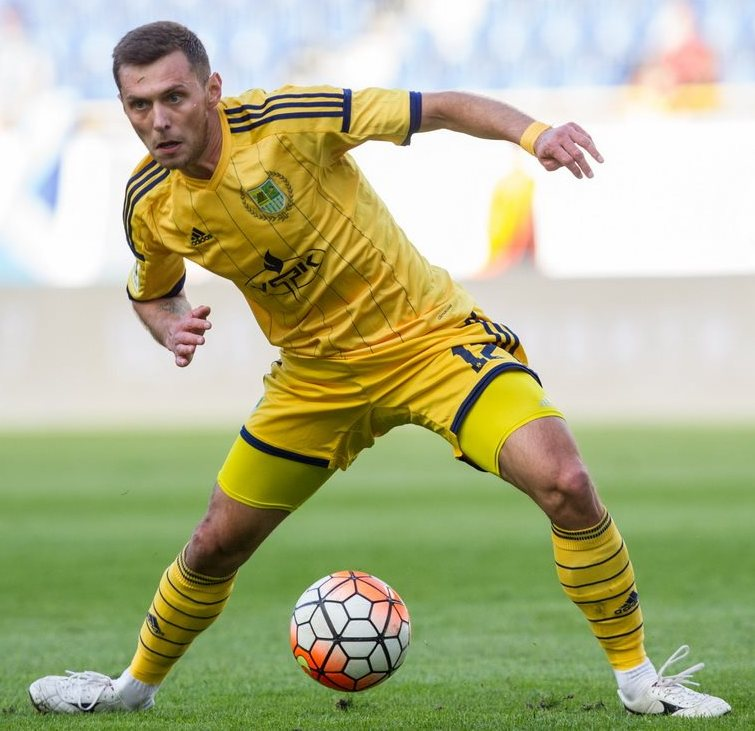

Personal information
- Full name: Artem Andriyovych Kasyanov
- Date of birth: 20 April 1983 (age 43)
- Place of birth: Stakhanov, Ukrainian SSR, Soviet Union
- Height: 1.82 m (5 ft 11 1/2 in)
- Position: Defensive midfielder

Youth career
- 1998–2000: Dynamo Stakhanov

Senior career*
Years	Team	Apps	(Gls)
2000–2002	Stal-2 Alchevsk	37	(4)
2002–2007	Stal Alchevsk	115	(12)
2007–2008	Metalurh Donetsk	9	(0)
2008–2009	Kharkiv	20	(1)
2009–2010	Chornomorets Odesa	2	(0)
2010–2015	Ordabasy	149	(21)
2016	Metalist Kharkiv	5	(0)
2016	Zhetysu	17	(2)
2017	Altai Semey	?	(?)
2017	Zhetysu	?	(?)
2018	Okzhetpes	?	(?)

International career
2003	Ukraine U21	1	(0)
- * Club domestic league appearances and goals as of 5 April 2017

Artem Andriyovych Kasyanov (Ukrainian: Артем Андрійович Касьянов; born 20 April 1983) is a Ukrainian footballer who most recently played as a midfielder for FC Okzhetpes in the Kazakhstan Premier League.

== Career ==
He moved to Kharkiv from Metalurh Donetsk during the 2008 summer transfer season. On 9 July 2009 he signed a two-year contract with Chornomorets Odesa.

On 8 June 2016, Kasyanov signed for Zhetysu.

Kasyanov played for FC Okzhetpes in the 2018 season and left the club after that season.
