= 2014 FC Kaisar season =

FC Kaisar
2014 season
- Chairman: Nurlan Abuov
- Manager: Dmitriy Ogai
- Stadium: Central Stadium
- Kazakhstan Premier League: 5th
- Kazakhstan Cup: Second Round vs Aktobe
- Top goalscorer: League: Rimo Hunt (8); All: Rimo Hunt (9)
Home colours	Away colours

The 2014 FC Kaisar season was the 1st season back in the Kazakhstan Premier League, the highest tier of association football in Kazakhstan, following their demotion to the Kazakhstan First Division in 2012. Kaisar finished the season in 5th place, narrowly missing out on a UEFA Europa League place on goal difference. Kaisar also reached the Second Round of the Kazakhstan Cup where they were knocked out by Aktobe.

== Squad ==
Note: Flags indicate national team as defined under FIFA eligibility rules; some limited exceptions apply. Players may hold more than one non-FIFA nationality.

No.	Pos.	Nation	Player
2	DF	KAZ	Olzhas Altaev
4	DF	MLI	Mamoutou Coulibaly
5	DF	KAZ	Damir Dautov
6	MF	KAZ	Rakhimzhan Rozybakiev
8	MF	KAZ	Duman Narzildaev
9	FW	RUS	Sergei Strukov
10	MF	KGZ	Anton Zemlianukhin
11	FW	KAZ	Elzhas Altynbekov
13	GK	KGZ	Kirill Pryadkin
15	DF	SRB	Miljan Jablan
17	FW	KAZ	Zhasulan Moldakaraev
20	MF	UKR	Vladyslav Nekhtiy

No.	Pos.	Nation	Player
22	MF	KAZ	Kirill Shestakov
23	FW	KAZ	Sergei Ostapenko
27	MF	MDA	Valentin Furdui
28	FW	EST	Rimo Hunt
29	MF	KAZ	Kazbek Geteriev
30	GK	UKR	Yevhen Shyryayev
32	DF	KAZ	Nurzharyk Kunov
35	GK	KAZ	Kirill Korotkevich
44	DF	CZE	Martin Klein
77	MF	KAZ	Ilia Kalinin
90	MF	SLO	Matic Maruško

== Transfers ==
=== Winter ===
In: Note: Flags indicate national team as defined under FIFA eligibility rules; some limited exceptions apply. Players may hold more than one non-FIFA nationality.

No.	Pos.	Nation	Player
4	DF	MLI	Mamoutou Coulibaly (from (Kazakhstan) Irtysh)
5	DF	KAZ	Damir Dautov (from (Kazakhstan) Zhetysu)
7	MF	EST	Sergei Mošnikov (from (Poland) Górnik Zabrze)
9	FW	RUS	Sergei Strukov (from (Kazakhstan) Irtysh)
10	FW	KGZ	Anton Zemlianukhin (from (Kazakhstan) Kairat)
15	DF	SRB	Miljan Jablan (from (Belarus) Neman Grodno)
22	MF	KAZ	Kirill Shestakov (from (Kazakhstan) Kairat)
25	FW	MKD	Dušan Savić (from (Ukraine) Hoverla Uzhhorod)
28	FW	EST	Rimo Hunt (from (Estonia) Levadia Tallinn)
30	GK	UKR	Yevhen Shyryayev (from (Ukraine) Zirka Kirovohrad)
44	DF	CZE	Martin Klein (from (Czech Republic) Teplice)
90	MF	SLO	Matic Maruško (from (Slovenia) Spartak Trnava)

Out: Note: Flags indicate national team as defined under FIFA eligibility rules; some limited exceptions apply. Players may hold more than one non-FIFA nationality.

No.	Pos.	Nation	Player
3	DF	KAZ	Yegor Azovskiy (to (Kazakhstan) Okzhetpes)
29	DF	SLO	Mitja Mörec (to (Azerbaijan) Ravan Baku)

=== Summer ===
In: Note: Flags indicate national team as defined under FIFA eligibility rules; some limited exceptions apply. Players may hold more than one non-FIFA nationality.

No.	Pos.	Nation	Player
20	MF	UKR	Vladyslav Nekhtiy (from (Kazakhstan) Kairat)
23	FW	KAZ	Sergei Ostapenko (from (Kazakhstan) Astana)
27	MF	MDA	Valentin Furdui (from (Moldova) Sheriff Tiraspol)
29	MF	KAZ	Kazbek Geteriev (from (Kazakhstan) Ordabasy)

Out: Note: Flags indicate national team as defined under FIFA eligibility rules; some limited exceptions apply. Players may hold more than one non-FIFA nationality.

No.	Pos.	Nation	Player
7	MF	EST	Sergei Mošnikov (to (Estonia) Flora)
25	FW	MKD	Dušan Savić (to (Bulgaria) Slavia Sofia)

== Competitions ==
=== Kazakhstan Premier League ===
==== First round ====
===== Results =====
15 March 2014 1	Kaisar	1 – 0	Ordabasy	Kyzylorda
16:00 (UTC+6)	Savić 23' (pen.); A.Baltaev (yellow card) 56'	Summary	Junuzović (yellow card) 22'; Nurgaliev (yellow card) 60'; Mukhtarov (yellow card) 75'	Stadium: Gany Muratbayev Stadium; Attendance: 4,000; Referee: Aleksandr Aliyev

22 March 2014 2	Kaisar	0 – 0	Taraz	Kyzylorda
16:00 (UTC+6)	A.Baltaev (yellow card) 46'	Summary	Barroilhet (yellow card) 14'	Stadium: Gany Muratbayev Stadium; Attendance: 4,000; Referee: Anatolyi Vishnichenko

29 March 2014 3	Astana	1 – 0	Kaisar	Astana
16:00 (UTC+6)	Nurdauletov (yellow card) 9'; Shomko (yellow card) 30'; Kojašević 90+4' (pen.) (yellow card) 90+4'	Summary	Coulibaly (yellow card) 14'; Maruško (yellow card) 36'; Savić (yellow card) 63'; Zemlianukhin (yellow card) 63'; N.Kunov (yellow card) 90+2'	Stadium: Astana Arena; Attendance: 3,000; Referee: Askhat Abdanbayev

5 April 2014 4	Kaisar	0 – 1	Kairat	Kyzylorda
16:00 (UTC+6)	R.Rozybakiev (yellow card) 25'; D.Dautov (yellow card) 38'; Klein (yellow card) 89'	Summary	Marković (yellow card) 56'; A.Darabayev 89'	Stadium: Gany Muratbayev Stadium; Attendance: 4,000; Referee: Igor Khisamutdinov

9 April 2014 5	Tobol	1 – 1	Kaisar	Kostanay
16:00 (UTC+6)	Tonev (yellow card) 16'; R.Aslan (yellow card) 45+1'; Šimkovič 50'; Volkov (yellow card) 85'	Summary	Strukov 28'; R.Rozybakiev (yellow card) 53'; Maruško (yellow card) 69'	Stadium: Kostanay Central Stadium; Attendance: 3,000; Referee: Timur Kumashev

13 April 2014 6	Kaisar	4 – 2	Irtysh	Kyzylorda
17:00 (UTC+6)	Savić 20' (pen.), 67'; Klein (yellow card) 27'; Strukov 42'; Zemlianukhin 48'	Summary	I.Yurin 6'; K.Begalyn 27'; Z.Korobov (yellow card) 42'	Stadium: Gany Muratbayev Stadium; Attendance: 3,800; Referee: Ruslan Duzmambetov

19 April 2014 7	Aktobe	3 – 0	Kaisar	Aktobe
17:00 (UTC+6)	Geynrikh 45+1'; Danilo Neco 49'; Korobkin (yellow card) 84'; D.Miroshnichenko 90+4'	Summary		Stadium: Central Stadium; Attendance: 5,000; Referee: Denis Izmailov

27 April 2014 8	Kaisar	1 – 0	Shakhter Karagandy	Kyzylorda
17:00 (UTC+6)	I.Kalinin 69'; A.Baltaev (yellow card) 90+1'	Summary	Baizhanov (yellow card) 48'; Vičius (yellow card) 62'; Yago (yellow card) 67'; Paryvaew (yellow card) 74'	Stadium: Gany Muratbayev Stadium; Attendance: 3,500; Referee: Igor Chesnokov

1 May 2014 9	Spartak Semey	1 – 1	Kaisar	Semey
16:00 (UTC+6)	Dyulgerov (yellow card) 19'; A.Sakenov (yellow card) 65'; Jovanović 73'; Kutsov (yellow card) 85'	Summary	Strukov 57'; R.Rozybakiev (yellow card) 65'; Savić (yellow card) 90+1'	Stadium: Spartak Stadium; Attendance: 4,500; Referee: Igor Khisamutdinov

6 May 2014 10	Kaisar	2 – 1	Atyrau	Kyzylorda
18:00 (UTC+6)	Klein (yellow card) 45'; Hunt 57', 78'	Summary	Parkhachev 13'; K.Pasichnik (yellow card) 45+1'	Stadium: Gany Muratbayev Stadium; Attendance: 5,500; Referee: Marat Iskakov

10 May 2014 11	Zhetysu	1 – 2	Kaisar	Taldykorgan
17:00 (UTC+6)	S.Sariyev 50'; K.Zarechny (yellow card) 84'	Summary	Hunt 12'; Strukov 82'	Stadium: Zhetysu Stadium; Attendance: 3,000; Referee: Aleksandr Gauzer

18 May 2014 12	Taraz	0 – 1	Kaisar	Taraz
17:00 (UTC+6)	M.Amirkhanov (yellow card) 70'	Summary	R.Rozybakiev (yellow card) 62'; Hunt 89' (pen.)	Stadium: Central Stadium; Attendance: 3,000; Referee: Aleksandr Gauzer

24 May 2014 13	Kaisar	1 – 0	Astana	Kyzylorda
19:00 (UTC+6)	Dmitrenko 7' (o.g.); Shestakov (yellow card) 30'; D.Dautov (yellow card) 37'; K.Pryadkin (yellow card) 90+5'	Summary	Dzholchiev (yellow card) 34'; Aničić (yellow card) 90+2'	Stadium: Gany Muratbayev Stadium; Attendance: 6,000; Referee: Denis Izmailov

28 May 2014 14	Kairat	1 – 0	Kaisar	Almaty
19:00 (UTC+6)	A.Darabayev 10' (yellow card) 39'; V.Sedelnikov (yellow card) 64'; Pliyev (yellow card) 79'; E.Kuantayev (yellow card) 82'	Summary	R.Rozybakiev (yellow card) 18'; A.Baltaev (yellow card) 32'; Maruško (yellow card) 70'; N.Kunov (yellow card) 72'	Stadium: Central Stadium; Attendance: 9,000; Referee: Anatolyi Vishnichenko

1 June 2014 15	Kaisar	0 – 0	Tobol	Kyzylorda
19:00 (UTC+6)	Hunt (yellow card) 72'; Coulibaly (yellow card) 79'	Summary	Tonev (yellow card) 55'	Stadium: Gany Muratbayev Stadium; Attendance: 6,000; Referee: Viktor Antonov

14 June 2014 16	Irtysh	1 – 1	Kaisar	Pavlodar
20:00 (UTC+6)	Govedarica (yellow card) 4'; Dudchenko 38'; Chernyshov (yellow card) 73' (yellow-red card) 90+1'	Summary	N.Kunov (yellow card) 32'; R.Rozybakiev 40'; Coulibaly (yellow card) 74'	Stadium: Central Stadium; Attendance: 2,500; Referee: Ruslan Duzmambetov

22 June 2014 17	Kaisar	2 – 2	Aktobe	Kyzylorda
19:00 (UTC+6)	Zemlianukhin 14'; Hunt 90+2'	Summary	Primus (yellow card) 45+1'; Zyankovich 50' (pen.); Pizzelli 72'	Stadium: Gany Muratbayev Stadium; Attendance: 4,500; Referee: Igor Aleshin

27 June 2014 18	Shakhter Karagandy	4 – 1	Kaisar	Karaganda
18:30 (UTC+6)	Finonchenko (yellow card) 12'; Konysbayev 15'; Topčagić 42', 58'; R.Murtazayev 43'; Malyi (yellow card) 83'	Summary	Hunt 86'	Stadium: Shakhter Stadium; Attendance: 3,000; Referee: Igor Khisamutdinov

5 July 2014 19	Kaisar	1 – 1	Spartak Semey	Kyzylorda
19:00 (UTC+6)	Strukov 26'; Zemlianukhin (yellow card) 60'	Summary	V.Akhmeyev (yellow card) 8'; Peev 64'; Jovanović (yellow card) 90+5'	Stadium: Gany Muratbayev Stadium; Attendance: 3,000; Referee: Aleksandr Gauzer

13 July 2014 20	Atyrau	1 – 3	Kaisar	Atyrau
20:00 (UTC+6)	Trifunović 45+1' (pen.)	Summary	Hunt 8', 88'; Savić (yellow card) 58'; Coulibaly 63'	Stadium: Munaishy Stadium; Attendance: 3,000; Referee: Sergey Duzmambetov

26 July 2014 21	Kaisar	0 – 0	Zhetysu	Kyzylorda
19:00 (UTC+6)	Narzildaev (yellow card) 56'; Savić (yellow card) 71'	Summary		Stadium: Gany Muratbayev Stadium; Attendance: 3,500; Referee: Aleksandr Aliyev

3 August 2014 22	Ordabasy	2 – 1	Kaisar	Shymkent
18:00 (UTC+6)	Klein 10' (o.g.); Tazhimbetov 33'	Summary	D.Dautov (yellow card) 49'; E.Altynbekov 89'	Stadium: Kazhimukan Munaitpasov Stadium; Attendance: 3,000; Referee: Aydin Rakhimbayev

===== League table =====
Pos	Team	Pld	W	D	L	GF	GA	GD	Pts	Qualification
4	Shakhter Karagandy	22	11	3	8	33	27	+6	36	Qualification for the championship round
5	Ordabasy	22	10	5	7	24	22	+2	35	Qualification for the championship round
6	Kaisar	22	8	8	6	23	23	0	32	Qualification for the championship round
7	Zhetysu	22	7	6	9	15	18	−3	27	Qualification for the relegation round
8	Tobol	22	6	8	8	22	29	−7	26	Qualification for the relegation round

Source: Soccerway (in Russian)
Rules for classification: 1st points;
Two team tiebreak: 1st overall wins; 2nd head-to-head record; 3rd goals difference; 4th goals scored; 5th away goals scored;
Multiple teams tiebreak: 1st overall wins; 2nd goals difference; 3rd goals scored; 4th away goals scored

==== Championship Round ====
===== Results summary =====
Overall								Home						Away					
Pld	W	D	L	GF	GA	GD	Pts	W	D	L	GF	GA	GD	W	D	L	GF	GA	GD
10	2	5	3	7	10	−3	11	1	2	2	5	6	−1	1	3	1	2	4	−2

Last updated: 11 December 2014.
Source: Soccerway

===== Results by round =====
Round	1	2	3	4	5	6	7	8	9	10
Ground	A	A	H	A	H	H	A	H	A	H
Result	D	W	L	D	D	L	D	D	L	W
Position										

Source: Soccerway
A = Away; H = Home; W = Win; D = Draw; L = Loss

===== Results =====
24 August 2014 1	Shakhter Karagandy	0 – 0	Kaisar	Karaganda
16:30 (UTC+6)	Maslo (yellow card) 21'; Konysbayev (yellow card) 69'; Paryvaew (yellow card) 90+5'	Summary	K.Pryadkin (yellow card) 62'; Shestakov (yellow card) 69'; Klein (yellow card) 71'; Strukov (yellow card) 72'	Stadium: Shakhter Stadium; Attendance: 1,500; Referee: Aleksandr Gauzer

29 August 2014 2	Ordabasy	0 – 1	Kaisar	Shymkent
17:30 (UTC+6)	Nurgaliev (yellow card) 53'	Summary	Furdui 45'; Hunt (yellow card) 70'	Stadium: Kazhimukan Munaitpasov Stadium; Attendance: 2,000; Referee: Askhat Abdanbayev

14 September 2014 3	Kaisar	0 – 2	Kairat	Kyzylorda
17:00 (UTC+6)	Coulibaly (yellow card) 52'; Jablan (yellow card) 71'	Summary	Islamkhan (yellow card) 43'; Gohou 62', 83'	Stadium: Gany Muratbayev Stadium; Attendance: 3,000; Referee: Denis Izmailov

20 September 2014 4	Aktobe	0 – 0	Kaisar	Aktobe
18:00 (UTC+6)		Summary	E.Altynbekov (yellow card) 61'	Stadium: Central Stadium; Attendance: 7,000; Referee: Aydin Rakhimbayev

28 September 2014 5	Kaisar	1 – 1	Astana	Kyzylorda
17:00 (UTC+6)	R.Rozybakiev (yellow card) 32'; Zemlianukhin 58'	Summary	Nusserbayev (yellow card) 50'; Beisebekov (yellow card) 57'; Cañas 90+3'	Stadium: Gany Muratbayev Stadium; Attendance: 4,000; Referee: Ruslan Duzmambetov

4 October 2014 6	Kaisar	0 – 1	Ordabasy	Kyzylorda
16:00 (UTC+6)	Coulibaly (yellow card) 11'; Nekhtiy (yellow card) 70'; Jablan (yellow card) 70'; R.Rozybakiev (yellow card) 80'	Summary	Kasyanov 45+2'; Y.Tungyshbayev (yellow card) 72'; B.Beisenov (yellow card) 75'; Grigorenko (yellow card) 90+1'	Stadium: Gany Muratbayev Stadium; Attendance: 5,200; Referee: Bolat Karlibayev

18 October 2014 7	Kairat	1 – 1	Kaisar	Almaty
18:00 (UTC+6)	Smakov (yellow card) 65'; Coulibaly 75' (o.g.)	Summary	D.Dautov (yellow card) 37'; Nekhtiy 53'; K.Pryadkin (yellow card) 90+4'	Stadium: Central Stadium; Attendance: 7,500; Referee: Askhat Abdanbayev

26 October 2014 8	Kaisar	2 – 2	Aktobe	Kyzylorda
16:00 (UTC+6)	Zemlianukhin 45+1' (pen.); Furdui (yellow card) 53' (goal) 87'	Summary	Antonov 20', 40' (yellow card) 35'; D.Miroshnichenko (red card) 45'; Arzumanyan (yellow card) 83'; A.Tagybergen (yellow card) 86'; Logvinenko (yellow card) 87'	Stadium: Gany Muratbayev Stadium; Attendance: 2,000; Referee: Artyom Kuchin

1 November 2014 9	Astana	3 – 0	Kaisar	Astana
18:00 (UTC+6)	Twumasi 13'; Shomko 71'; Kéthévoama 78'	Summary	Furdui (yellow card) 27'; R.Rozybakiev (yellow card) 40'; I.Kalinin (yellow card) 48'; Jablan (yellow card) 77'	Stadium: Astana Arena; Attendance: 3,500; Referee: Denis Izmailov

9 November 2014 10	Kaisar	2 – 1	Shakhter Karagandy	Kyzylorda
15:00 (UTC+6)	N.Kunov (yellow card) 43'; Moldakaraev 52' (pen.), 80' (pen.) (yellow card) 62'	Summary	Maslo 18' (yellow card) 79'; R.Murtazayev (yellow card) 43'; M.Gabyshev (yellow card) 51'	Stadium: Gany Muratbayev Stadium; Attendance: 4,000; Referee: Marat Iskakov

===== Table =====
Pos	Team	Pld	W	D	L	GF	GA	GD	Pts	Qualification
2	Aktobe	32	17	10	5	52	31	+21	40	Qualification for the Europa League first qualifying round
3	Kairat	32	18	5	9	58	31	+27	38	Qualification for the Europa League first qualifying round
4	Ordabasy	32	13	5	14	34	44	−10	27	Qualification for the Europa League first qualifying round
5	Kaisar	32	10	13	9	30	34	−4	27	
6	Shakhter Karagandy	32	11	6	15	41	49	−8	21	

Source: Soccerway (in Russian)
Rules for classification: 1st points;
Two team tiebreak: 1st overall wins; 2nd head-to-head record; 3rd goals difference; 4th goals scored; 5th away goals scored;
Multiple teams tiebreak: 1st overall wins; 2nd goals difference; 3rd goals scored; 4th away goals scored.
Team start with half number of points from first round.

=== Kazakhstan Cup ===
23 April 2014 First Round	Zhetysu-Sunkar	0 – 2	Kaisar	Taldykorgan
16:00 (UTC+6)		[ Summary]	Hunt 44'; Narzildaev 54'	Stadium: Zhetysu Stadium; Referee: Dmitry Bistrov

14 May 2014 Second Round	Kaisar	0 – 3	Aktobe	Kyzylorda
18:00 (UTC+6)	O.Altaev (yellow card) 55'; Coulibaly (yellow card) 71'	Summary	Zyankovich 56'; Aimbetov 59'; Muldarov (yellow card) 71'; Korobkin 85'; Arzumanyan (yellow card) 90+1'	Stadium: Gany Muratbayev Stadium; Attendance: 4,000; Referee: Artyom Kuchin

== Squad statistics ==
As of Match played 22 November 2014

=== Appearances and goals ===
No.	Pos	Nat	Player	Total		Premier League		Kazakhstan Cup	
No.	Pos	Nat	Player	Apps	Goals	Apps	Goals	Apps	Goals
2	DF	(Kazakhstan) KAZ	Olzhas Altaev	5	0	4	0	1	0
4	DF	(Mali) MLI	Mamoutou Coulibaly	31	1	29+1	1	1	0
5	DF	(Kazakhstan) KAZ	Damir Dautov	27	0	26	0	1	0
6	MF	(Kazakhstan) KAZ	Rakhimzhan Rozybakiev	29	1	25+3	1	0+1	0
8	MF	(Kazakhstan) KAZ	Duman Narzildaev	16	0	9+6	0	1	0
9	FW	(Russia) RUS	Sergei Strukov	26	5	25+1	5	0	0
10	MF	(Kyrgyzstan) KGZ	Anton Zemlianukhin	21	4	18+3	4	0	0
11	FW	(Kazakhstan) KAZ	Elzhas Altynbekov	6	1	1+5	1	0	0
13	GK	(Kyrgyzstan) KGZ	Kirill Pryadkin	32	0	32	0	0	0
15	DF	(Serbia) SRB	Miljan Jablan	19	0	14+4	0	1	0
17	FW	(Kazakhstan) KAZ	Zhasulan Moldakaraev	20	2	6+13	2	1	0
20	MF	(Ukraine) UKR	Vladyslav Nekhtiy	5	1	5	1	0	0
22	MF	(Kazakhstan) KAZ	Kirill Shestakov	21	0	18+2	0	1	0
23	FW	(Kazakhstan) KAZ	Sergei Ostapenko	11	0	4+7	0	0	0
27	MF	(Moldova) MDA	Valentin Furdui	12	2	11+1	2	0	0
28	FW	(Estonia) EST	Rimo Hunt	28	8	19+8	8	0+1	0
30	GK	(Ukraine) UKR	Yevhen Shyryayev	1	0	0	0	1	0
32	DF	(Kazakhstan) KAZ	Nurzharyk Kunov	16	0	5+11	0	0	0
44	DF	(Czech Republic) CZE	Martin Klein	24	0	24	0	0	0
77	MF	(Kazakhstan) KAZ	Ilia Kalinin	24	1	18+5	1	0+1	0
90	MF	(Slovenia) SLO	Matic Maruško	26	0	24+2	0	0	0
	DF	(Kazakhstan) KAZ	Aldan Baltaev	15	0	13+2	0	0	0
	MF	(Kazakhstan) KAZ	Kazbek Geteriev	2	0	0+2	0	0	0
	FW	(Kazakhstan) KAZ	Suyndik Kushekov	1	0	0+1	0	0	0
Players who appeared for Kaisar that left during the season:
7	MF	(Estonia) EST	Sergei Mošnikov	19	0	8+10	0	1	0
25	FW	(North Macedonia) MKD	Dušan Savić	19	3	12+6	3	1	0
	MF	(Kazakhstan) KAZ	Sergey Shevtsov	4	0	2+1	0	1	0

=== Goal scorers ===
Place	Position	Nation	Number	Name	Premier League	Kazakhstan Cup	Total
1	FW	(Estonia)	28	Rimo Hunt	8	1	9
2	FW	(Russia)	9	Sergei Strukov	5	0	5
3	FW	(Kyrgyzstan)	10	Anton Zemlianukhin	4	0	4
4	FW	(North Macedonia)	25	Dušan Savić	3	0	3
5	MF	(Moldova)	27	Valentin Furdui	2	0	2
5	FW	(Kazakhstan)	17	Zhasulan Moldakaraev	2	0	2
7	MF	(Kazakhstan)	6	Rakhimzhan Rozybakiev	1	0	1
7	DF	(Mali)	4	Mamoutou Coulibaly	1	0	1
7	FW	(Kazakhstan)	11	Elzhas Altynbekov	1	0	1
7	MF	(Ukraine)	20	Vladyslav Nekhtiy	1	0	1
7	MF	(Kazakhstan)	77	Ilia Kalinin	1	0	1
7				Own goal	1	0	1
7	MF	(Kazakhstan)	8	Duman Narzildaev	0	1	1
				TOTALS	30	2	32

=== Disciplinary record ===
Number	Nation	Position	Name	Premier League		Kazakhstan Cup		Total	
Number	Nation	Position	Name	Yellow card	Red card	Yellow card	Red card	Yellow card	Red card
4	(Mali)	DF	Mamoutou Coulibaly	5	0	0	0	1	0
5	(Kazakhstan)	DF	Damir Dautov	4	0	0	0	1	0
6	(Kazakhstan)	MF	Rakhimzhan Rozybakiev	8	0	0	0	1	0
8	(Kazakhstan)	MF	Duman Narzildaev	1	0	0	0	1	0
9	(Russia)	FW	Sergei Strukov	1	0	0	0	1	0
10	(Kyrgyzstan)	MF	Anton Zemlianukhin	2	0	0	0	1	0
11	(Kazakhstan)	FW	Elzhas Altynbekov	1	0	0	0	1	0
13	(Kyrgyzstan)	GK	Kirill Pryadkin	3	0	0	0	1	0
15	(Serbia)	DF	Miljan Jablan	3	0	0	0	1	0
17	(Kazakhstan)	FW	Zhasulan Moldakaraev	1	0	0	0	1	0
20	(Ukraine)	MF	Vladyslav Nekhtiy	1	0	0	0	1	0
22	(Kazakhstan)	MF	Kirill Shestakov	1	0	0	0	1	0
25	(North Macedonia)	FW	Dušan Savić	4	0	0	0	1	0
27	(Moldova)	MF	Valentin Furdui	2	0	0	0	1	0
28	(Estonia)	FW	Rimo Hunt	2	0	0	0	1	0
32	(Kazakhstan)	DF	Nurzharyk Kunov	4	0	0	0	1	0
44	(Czech Republic)	DF	Martin Klein	4	0	0	0	1	0
77	(Kazakhstan)	MF	Ilia Kalinin	1	0	0	0	1	0
90	(Slovenia)	MF	Matic Maruško	3	0	0	0	1	0
	(Kazakhstan)	DF	Aldan Baltaev	4	0	0	0	1	0
			TOTALS	55	0	0	0	55	0
