= 2015 FC Kaisar season =

FC Kaisar
2015 season
- Chairman: Nurlan Abuov
- Manager: Dmitriy Ogai (until 23 July); Fyodor Shcherbachenko (from 6 August)
- Stadium: Central Stadium
- Kazakhstan Premier League: 12th (Relegated)
- Kazakhstan Cup: Quarterfinal vs Astana
- Top goalscorer: League: Zhasulan Moldakaraev (6); All: Zhasulan Moldakaraev (6)
Home colours	Away colours

The 2015 FC Kaisar season is the club's fifth season back in the Kazakhstan Premier League, the highest tier of association football in Kazakhstan, and 20th in total. Kaisar will also take part in the Kazakhstan Cup.

In July Dmitriy Ogai resigned, with Fyodor Shcherbachenko appointed as his successor on 6 August.

== Squad ==
As of 14 July 2015

Note: Flags indicate national team as defined under FIFA eligibility rules; some limited exceptions apply. Players may hold more than one non-FIFA nationality.

No.	Pos.	Nation	Player
1	GK	KAZ	Maksat Seidakhmet
2	MF	SRB	Vuk Mitošević (loan from Jagodina)
3	DF	KAZ	Aldan Baltaev
5	DF	KAZ	Damir Dautov
6	MF	KAZ	Rakhimzhan Rozybakiev
8	MF	KAZ	Duman Narzildaev
9	FW	RUS	Sergei Strukov
11	FW	KAZ	Elzhas Altynbekov
13	GK	KGZ	Kirill Pryadkin
14	DF	KAZ	Farkhadbek Irismetov
15	FW	BUL	Georgi Karaneychev
17	FW	KAZ	Zhasulan Moldakaraev

No.	Pos.	Nation	Player
18	DF	KAZ	Daniel Choi
19	MF	CRO	Josip Knežević
21	DF	KAZ	Kairat Nurdauletov
22	MF	KAZ	Kirill Shestakov
23	DF	KAZ	Olzhas Altaev
24	MF	KAZ	Jan Vorogovsky
27	MF	BLR	Anton Matsveenka
28	FW	EST	Rimo Hunt
30	DF	KAZ	Sergey Keiler
35	GK	KAZ	Ramil Nurmukhametov
44	DF	CZE	Martin Klein
77	MF	KAZ	Ilia Kalinin

== Transfers ==
=== Winter ===
In: Note: Flags indicate national team as defined under FIFA eligibility rules; some limited exceptions apply. Players may hold more than one non-FIFA nationality.

No.	Pos.	Nation	Player
2	MF	SRB	Vuk Mitošević (loan from (Serbia) Jagodina)
7	MF	KAZ	Serikzhan Muzhikov (from (Kazakhstan) Astana)
10	MF	KAZ	Sergei Skorykh (from (Kazakhstan) Taraz)
14	DF	KAZ	Farkhadbek Irismetov (from (Kazakhstan) Ordabasy)
21	DF	KAZ	Kairat Nurdauletov (from (Kazakhstan) Astana)
25	DF	BUL	Plamen Dimov (from (Bulgaria) Levski Sofia)
31	DF	KAZ	Aleksei Muldarov (from (Kazakhstan) Aktobe)
33	FW	SVK	Juraj Piroska (from (Slovakia) Senica)
35	GK	KAZ	Ramil Nurmukhametov (from (Kazakhstan) Taraz)
86	FW	CRO	Edin Junuzović (from (South Korea) Gyeongnam)

Out: Note: Flags indicate national team as defined under FIFA eligibility rules; some limited exceptions apply. Players may hold more than one non-FIFA nationality.

No.	Pos.	Nation	Player
4	DF	MLI	Mamoutou Coulibaly (to (Bulgaria) Cherno More)
10	MF	KGZ	Anton Zemlianukhin (to (Serbia) Radnički Niš)
15	DF	SRB	Miljan Jablan (to (Kazakhstan) Akzhayik)
23	FW	KAZ	Sergei Ostapenko (to (Kazakhstan) Astana)
27	MF	MDA	Valentin Furdui (to (Moldova) Zimbru Chișinău)
29	MF	KAZ	Kazbek Geteriev (to (Kazakhstan) Irtysh)
30	GK	UKR	Yevhen Shyryayev
32	DF	KAZ	Nurzharyk Kunov
35	GK	KAZ	Kirill Korotkevich (to (Kazakhstan) Tobol)
77	MF	KAZ	Ilia Kalinin (to (Kazakhstan) Kairat)
90	MF	SLO	Matic Maruško (to (Kazakhstan) Akzhayik)

=== Summer ===
In: Note: Flags indicate national team as defined under FIFA eligibility rules; some limited exceptions apply. Players may hold more than one non-FIFA nationality.

No.	Pos.	Nation	Player
15	FW	BUL	Georgi Karaneychev (from (Moldova) Tiraspol)
19	MF	CRO	Josip Knežević
27	DF	BLR	Anton Matsveenka (from (Belarus) Torpedo-BelAZ Zhodino)
77	MF	KAZ	Ilia Kalinin (from (Kazakhstan) Kairat)

Out: Note: Flags indicate national team as defined under FIFA eligibility rules; some limited exceptions apply. Players may hold more than one non-FIFA nationality.

No.	Pos.	Nation	Player
7	MF	KAZ	Serikzhan Muzhikov (to (Kazakhstan) Astana)
10	MF	KAZ	Sergei Skorykh (to (Kazakhstan) Shakhter Karagandy)
20	MF	UKR	Vladyslav Nekhtiy
25	DF	BUL	Plamen Dimov (to (Kazakhstan) Shakhter Karagandy)
31	DF	KAZ	Aleksei Muldarov (to (Kazakhstan) Shakhter Karagandy)
33	FW	SVK	Juraj Piroska (to (Slovakia) Spartak Myjava)
86	FW	CRO	Edin Junuzović (to (Kazakhstan) Ordabasy)

== Competitions ==
=== Kazakhstan Premier League ===
==== First round ====
===== Results summary =====
Overall								Home						Away					
Pld	W	D	L	GF	GA	GD	Pts	W	D	L	GF	GA	GD	W	D	L	GF	GA	GD
22	3	8	11	12	25	−13	17	2	6	3	6	8	−2	1	2	8	6	17	−11

Last updated: 28 July 2015.
Source: Soccerway

===== Results by round =====
Round	1	2	3	4	5	6	7	8	9	10	11	12	13	14	15	16	17	18	19	20	21	22
Ground	H	A	H	A	H	A	H	A	H	H	A	H	A	H	A	H	A	H	A	A	H	A
Result	D	L	D	W	D	D	L	D	W	D	L	L	L	W	L	D	L	D	L	L	L	L
Position	7	9	7	6	6	8	10	8	8	8	8	9	10	9	10	10	10	10	10	11	11	12

Source: Soccerway
A = Away; H = Home; W = Win; D = Draw; L = Loss

===== Results =====
7 March 2015 1	Kaisar	0 – 0	Zhetysu	Kyzylorda
15:00 (UTC+6)	Irismetov (yellow card) 59'	Summary	S.Sariyev (yellow card) 66'	Stadium: Gany Muratbayev Stadium; Attendance: 2,500; Referee: Bagdat Abdullaev

11 March 2015 2	Okzhetpes	1 – 0	Kaisar	Kokshetau
18:00 (UTC+6)	Chertov (yellow card) 59'; Rotkovic 81'	Summary	R.Rozybakiev (yellow card) 27'	Stadium: Okzhetpes Stadium; Attendance: 1,000; Referee: Artyom Kuchin

15 March 2015 3	Kaisar	0 – 0	Irtysh	Kyzylorda
15:00 (UTC+6)	E.Altynbekov (yellow card) 38'; Dimov (yellow card) 60'; A.Baltaev (yellow card) 73'	Summary	Chernyshov (yellow card) 16' (yellow-red card) 76'; G.Sartakov (yellow card) 80'	Stadium: Gany Muratbayev Stadium; Attendance: 3,000; Referee: Aleksandr Gauzer

21 March 2015 4	Shakhter Karagandy	1 – 2	Kaisar	Karaganda
16:00 (UTC+6)	Topčagić (yellow card) 71'; Karpovich (yellow card) 75'; Đidić (yellow card) 80'	Summary	Dimov 44'; R.Rozybakiev (yellow card) 83'; Junuzović 87'; Shestakov (yellow card) 90+1'	Stadium: Shakhter Stadium; Attendance: 1,800; Referee: Denis Tevyashov

5 April 2015 5	Kaisar	0 – 0	Atyrau	Kyzylorda
16:00 (UTC+6)	Shestakov (yellow card) 60'; Nekhtiy (yellow card) 68'	Summary	Essame (yellow card) 82'	Stadium: Gany Muratbayev Stadium; Attendance: 3,000; Referee: Aleksandr Gauzer

11 April 2015 6	Aktobe	0 – 0	Kaisar	Aktobe
17:00 (UTC+6)		Summary	Muzhikov (yellow card) 60'	Stadium: Central Stadium; Attendance: 3,000; Referee: Ruslan Duzmambetov

15 April 2015 7	Kaisar	1 – 3	Taraz	Kyzylorda
16:00 (UTC+6)	Muzhikov (yellow card) 43'; Muldarov 69'	Summary	Mera 24'; Pyschur 31', 57' (pen.); A.Taubay (yellow card) 69'	Stadium: Gany Muratbayev Stadium; Attendance: 2,000; Referee: Aydin Rakhimbayev

19 April 2015 8	Ordabasy	0 – 0	Kaisar	Shymkent
14:00 (UTC+6)	Abdulin (yellow card) 23'; Mukhtarov (yellow card) 25'; Tazhimbetov (yellow card) 60'	Summary	Hunt (yellow card) 25'	Stadium: Kazhimukan Munaitpasov Stadium; Attendance: 3,500; Referee: Igor Chesnokov

25 April 2015 9	Kaisar	2 – 1	Astana	Kyzylorda
15:00 (UTC+6)	Muldarov 9'; J.Vorogovsky (yellow card) 29' (yellow-red card) 86'; Mitošević (yellow card) 40'; Moldakaraev 78' (yellow card) 84'	Summary	Aničić (yellow card) 39'; Maksimović 70'; Dzholchiev (yellow card) 76'	Stadium: Gany Muratbayev Stadium; Attendance: 3,000; Referee: Anatolyi Vishnichenko

3 May 2015 10	Kaisar	0 – 0	Kairat	Kyzylorda
17:00 (UTC+6)	Irismetov (yellow card) 8'; D.Choi (yellow card) 28'; Klein (yellow card) 64'	Summary	Kuat (yellow card) 41'; Marković (yellow card) 86'	Stadium: Gany Muratbayev Stadium; Attendance: 4,800; Referee: Viktor Antonov

7 May 2015 11	Tobol	1 – 0	Kaisar	Kostanay
17:00 (UTC+6)	Sadownichy 90'	Summary	R.Rozybakiev (yellow card) 43'; Junuzovic (yellow card) 44'	Stadium: Central Stadium; Attendance: 2,500; Referee: Aydin Rakhimbayev

16 May 2015 12	Kaisar	0 – 1	Okzhetpes	Kyzylorda
18:00 (UTC+6)	Nurdauletov (yellow card) 52'	Summary	M.Tuliyev (yellow card) 10'; I.Mangutkin 12' (yellow card) 61'; Buleshev 36'; Rotkovic (yellow card) 37'; Di Chiara (yellow card) 90+2'	Stadium: Gany Muratbayev Stadium; Attendance: 2,000; Referee: Denis Tevyashov

24 May 2015 13	Irtysh	4 – 2	Kaisar	Pavlodar
17:00 (UTC+6)	Dudchenko 25', 32', 62'; Kislitsyn 41'; Azuka (yellow card) 44'; Chernyshov (yellow card) 76'	Summary	Junuzović 49'; A.Baltaev (yellow card) 62'; Klein (yellow card) 66'; Hunt 90+2'	Stadium: Central Stadium; Attendance: 3,000; Referee: Aleksander Aliyev

29 May 2015 14	Kaisar	2 – 0	Shakhter Karagandy	Kyzylorda
18:30 (UTC+6)	Strukov 34'; S.Keiler (yellow card) 36'; Junuzovic 57'	Summary	Pokrivač (yellow card) 28'; Paryvaew (yellow card) 82'	Stadium: Gany Muratbayev Stadium; Attendance: 3,000; Referee: Marat Iskakov

6 June 2015 15	Atyrau	2 – 1	Kaisar	Atyrau
20:00 (UTC+6)	Ivanović 19'; Grigoryev 52'; R.Esatov (yellow card) 55'	Summary	Strukov (yellow card) 17'; Mitošević (yellow card) 32'; J.Vorogovsky 45+1'; Irismetov (yellow card) 51'; Muldarov (yellow card) 74'	Stadium: Munaishy Stadium; Attendance: 6,500; Referee: Bolat Karlibayev

20 June 2015 16	Kaisar	0 – 0	Aktobe	Kyzylorda
19:00 (UTC+6)	Nurdauletov (yellow card) 24'; Irismetov (yellow card) 78'; Klein (yellow card) 80'	Summary	D.Zhalmukan (yellow card) 26'; Dmitrenko (yellow card) 28'; Danilo (red card) 58'; Logvinenko (yellow card) 80'	Stadium: Gany Muratbayev Stadium; Attendance: 2,500; Referee: Artyom Kuchin

24 June 2015 17	Taraz	3 – 0	Kaisar	Taraz
19:00 (UTC+6)	Pyschur 3'; S.Zhumahanov 31'; Golić 71'	Summary	Shestakov (yellow card) 21'; Hunt (yellow card) 47'; R.Rozybakiev (yellow card) 76'; Strukov (yellow card) 81'	Stadium: Central Stadium; Attendance: 4,000; Referee: Denis Izmailov

27 June 2015 18	Kaisar	1 – 1	Ordabasy	Kyzylorda
19:00 (UTC+6)	Junuzovic (yellow card) 45+2'; Moldakaraev 59'	Summary	G.Suyumbaev (yellow card) 30'; Nurgaliev 56' (pen.); T.Adyrbekov (yellow card) 63'; Trajković (yellow card) 77'	Stadium: Gany Muratbayev Stadium; Attendance: 2,000; Referee: Aydin Rakhimbayev

4 July 2015 19	Astana	2 – 0	Kaisar	Astana
20:00 (UTC+6)	R.Rozybakiev 26' (o.g.); Nusserbayev 48'; Beisebekov (yellow card) 75'	Summary	R.Rozybakiev (yellow card) 40'; Knežević (yellow card) 41'	Stadium: Astana Arena; Attendance: 3,000; Referee: Bolat Karlibayev

12 July 2015 20	Kairat	1 – 0	Kaisar	Almaty
19:30 (UTC+6)	Despotović 17'	Summary	Matsveenka (yellow card) 90'	Stadium: Central Stadium; Attendance: 6,000; Referee: Bagdat Abdullaev

18 July 2015 21	Kaisar	0 – 1	Tobol	Kyzylorda
19:00 (UTC+6)	Irismetov (yellow card) 6'; Strukov (yellow card) 90+1'	Summary	Zhumaskaliyev 9' (yellow card) 14'; Bogdanov (yellow card) 44'; Matulevičius (yellow card) 90+1'; A.Agaysin (yellow card) 90+3'	Stadium: Gany Muratbayev Stadium; Attendance: 1,500; Referee: Sergey Gorokhovodatskiy

26 July 2015 22	Zhetysu	2 – 1	Kaisar	Taldykorgan
18:30 (UTC+6)	Galiakberov 12', 58'; A.Pasechenko (yellow card) 90+4'	Summary	Shestakov 21'; Karaneychev (yellow card) 26'	Stadium: Zhetysu Stadium; Attendance: 1,500; Referee: Timur Kumashev

===== League table =====
Pos	Team	Pld	W	D	L	GF	GA	GD	Pts	Qualification
8	Tobol	22	7	4	11	22	32	−10	25	Qualification for the relegation round
9	Taraz	22	7	3	12	17	25	−8	24	Qualification for the relegation round
10	Shakhter Karagandy	22	5	3	14	16	38	−22	18	Qualification for the relegation round
11	Zhetysu	22	4	5	13	17	32	−15	17	Qualification for the relegation round
12	Kaisar	22	3	8	11	12	25	−13	17	Qualification for the relegation round

Source: UEFA.com, Soccerway
Rules for classification: 1) Points; 2) Matches won; 3) Head-to-head points; 4) Head-to-head matches won; 5) Head-to-head goal difference; 6) Head-to-head goals scored; 7) Head-to-head away goals scored; 8) Goal difference; 9) Goals scored; 10) Away goals scored; 11) Draw.

==== Relegation Round ====
===== Results summary =====
Overall								Home						Away					
Pld	W	D	L	GF	GA	GD	Pts	W	D	L	GF	GA	GD	W	D	L	GF	GA	GD
9	0	3	6	8	11	−3	3	0	1	4	4	5	−1	0	2	2	4	6	−2

Last updated: 10 November 2015.
Source: Soccerway

===== Results by round =====
Round	1	2	3	4	5	6	7	8	9	10
Ground	H	A	H	A	H	A	A	H	A	H
Result	D	L	L	D	W	L	D	L	L	D
Position	12	12	12	12	12	12	12	12	12	12

Source: Soccerway
A = Away; H = Home; W = Win; D = Draw; L = Loss

===== Results =====
15 August 2015 23	Kaisar	0 – 0	Taraz	Kyzylorda
18:00 (UTC+6)	S.Keiler (red card) 26'; R.Rozybakiev (yellow card) 41'; Knežević (yellow card) 62'	Summary	Azuka (red card) 26'; M.Amirkhanov (yellow card) 26'; D.Bashlay (yellow card) 36'	Stadium: Gani Muratbayev Stadium; Attendance: 3,500; Referee: Denis Tevyashov

23 August 2015 24	Okzhetpes	2 – 1	Kaisar	Kokshetau
17:00 (UTC+6)	Chyzhov (yellow card) 12'; Pawlaw (yellow card) 18'; Sychev 22'; A.Kuksin (yellow card) 63'; Rotkovic 82' (yellow card) 83'	Summary	Moldakaraev 14'; R.Rozybakiev (yellow card) 29'; Irismetov (yellow card) 32'; Knežević (yellow card) 49'	Stadium: Okzhetpes Stadium; Attendance: 2,000; Referee: Sergey Gorokhovodatskiy

13 September 2015 25	Kaisar	1 – 2	Tobol	Kyzylorda
17:00 (UTC+6)	Knežević 21' (yellow card) 90'; A.Baltaev (yellow card) 74'	Summary	O.Krasić 12'; Kurgulin (yellow card) 25'; Zyankovich 38'	Stadium: Gani Muratbayev Stadium; Attendance: 2,200; Referee: Artyom Kuchin

19 September 2015 26	Shakhter Karagandy	1 – 1	Kaisar	Karaganda
17:00 (UTC+6)	Karpovich (yellow card) 38'; Đidić (yellow card) 40'; Feshchuk 53'; Sass (yellow card) 90+1'	Summary	Moldakaraev 31'; Shestakov (yellow card) 36'; Irismetov (yellow card) 65'; Mitošević (yellow card) 85'	Stadium: Shakhter Stadium; Attendance: 1,800; Referee: Denis Izmailov

27 September 2015 27	Kaisar	3 – 1	Zhetysu	Kyzylorda
17:00 (UTC+6)	Klein 10'; Moldakaraev 58' (yellow card) 78'; I.Kalinin 70'	Summary	S.Sagyndykov (yellow card) 73'; Gerasimov (yellow card) 78'; Turysbek 90+3'	Stadium: Gani Muratbayev Stadium; Attendance: 3,000; Referee: Bolat Karlibayev

3 October 2015 28	Kaisar	0 – 1	Okzhetpes	Kyzylorda
16:30 (UTC+6)	Klein (yellow card) 36'; Matsveenka (yellow card) 55'; Shestakov (yellow card) 75'	Summary	Shabalin 25'; Chertov (yellow card) 64'; Cvetković (yellow card) 86'; Rotković (yellow card) 90+3'	Stadium: Gani Muratbayev Stadium; Attendance: 2,000; Referee: Sergey Gorokhovodatskiy

18 October 2015 29	Tobol	0 – 0	Kaisar	Kostanay
17:00 (UTC+6)	Šljivić (yellow card) 55'	Summary	R.Rozybakiev (yellow card) 61'	Stadium: Central Stadium; Attendance: 1,000; Referee: Ruslan Duzmambetov

24 October 2015 30	Kaisar	0 – 1	Shakhter Karagandy	Kyzylorda
15:00 (UTC+6)	S.Keiler (yellow card) 9'	Summary	R.Murtazayev (yellow card) 31'; Dimov 69'	Stadium: Gani Muratbayev Stadium; Attendance: 1,000; Referee: Viktor Antonov

31 October 2015 31	Zhetysu	2 – 1	Kaisar	Taldykorgan
15:00 (UTC+6)	S.Sagyndykov (yellow card) 21'; Turysbek (yellow card) 64'; E.Guliev 79'; Ergashev (red card) 90+4'; Savić 90+5'	Summary	A.Baltaev 13'; R.Rozybakiev (yellow card) 32'; Matsveenka (yellow card) 52'; Irismetov (yellow card) 64' (red card) 90+4'	Stadium: Zhetysu Stadium; Attendance: 2,000; Referee: Aydin Rakhimbayev

8 November 2015 32	Taraz	1 – 1	Kaisar	Taraz
15:00 (UTC+6)	Pyschur 32' (pen.); Gatagov (yellow card) 61' (yellow-red card) 90+3'; D.Bashlay (yellow card) 69'; S.Zhumahanov (yellow card) 71' (yellow-red card) 72'	Summary	Moldakaraev 24'; R.Nurmukhametov (yellow card) 90+3'	Stadium: Central Stadium; Attendance: 2,000; Referee: Timur Kumashev

===== League table =====
Pos	Team	Pld	W	D	L	GF	GA	GD	Pts	Relegation
7	Tobol	32	12	6	14	32	42	−10	30	
8	Okzhetpes	32	12	6	14	36	41	−5	29	
9	Taraz	32	10	8	14	25	33	−8	26	
10	Shakhter Karagandy	32	9	5	18	27	47	−20	23	
11	Zhetysu (O)	32	8	6	18	28	46	−18	22	Qualification for the relegation play-off
12	Kaisar (R)	32	4	12	16	20	36	−16	16	Relegation to the Kazakhstan First Division

Source: Soccerway
Rules for classification: 1) Points; 2) Matches won; 3) Head-to-head points; 4) Head-to-head matches won; 5) Head-to-head goal difference; 6) Head-to-head goals scored; 7) Head-to-head away goals scored; 8) Goal difference; 9) Goals scored; 10) Away goals scored; 11) Draw.
(O) Play-off winners; (R) Relegated

=== Kazakhstan Cup ===
28 April 2015 Second Round	Kaisar	1 – 0	Spartak Semey	Kyzylorda
17:00 (UTC+6)	Kutsov 50' (o.g.); R.Rozybakiev (yellow card) 81'	Summary	Malyshev (yellow card) 79'	Stadium: Gany Muratbayev Stadium; Attendance: 3,000; Referee: Baghdad Abdullayev

20 May 2015 Quarterfinal	Kaisar	1 – 2 (a.e.t.)	Astana	Kyzylorda
18:00 (UTC+6)	Shestakov (yellow card) 38'; Piroska (yellow card) 44'; Junuzović 45'; Klein (yellow card) 94'	Summary	Kéthévoama (yellow card) 31'; Akhmetov (yellow card) 57'; Twumasi 69', 110'	Stadium: Gany Muratbayev Stadium; Attendance: 2,000; Referee: Denis Izmailov

== Squad statistics ==
As of Match played 8 November 2015

=== Appearances and goals ===
No.	Pos	Nat	Player	Total		Premier League		Kazakhstan Cup	
No.	Pos	Nat	Player	Apps	Goals	Apps	Goals	Apps	Goals
1	GK	(Kazakhstan) KAZ	Maksat Seidakhmet	1	0	1	0	0	0
2	MF	(Serbia) SRB	Vuk Mitošević	23	0	22+1	0	0	0
3	DF	(Kazakhstan) KAZ	Aldan Baltaev	29	1	28	1	0+1	0
6	MF	(Kazakhstan) KAZ	Rakhimzhan Rozybakiev	24	0	22+1	0	0+1	0
8	MF	(Kazakhstan) KAZ	Duman Narzildaev	9	0	5+3	0	1	0
9	FW	(Russia) RUS	Sergei Strukov	23	1	14+8	1	0+1	0
11	FW	(Kazakhstan) KAZ	Elzhas Altynbekov	15	0	2+11	0	1+1	0
13	GK	(Kyrgyzstan) KGZ	Kirill Pryadkin	28	0	27	0	1	0
14	DF	(Kazakhstan) KAZ	Farkhadbek Irismetov	25	0	20+3	0	2	0
15	FW	(Bulgaria) BUL	Georgi Karaneychev	5	0	2+3	0	0	0
17	FW	(Kazakhstan) KAZ	Zhasulan Moldakaraev	23	6	17+5	6	1	0
18	DF	(Kazakhstan) KAZ	Daniel Choi	14	0	10+4	0	0	0
19	MF	(Croatia) CRO	Josip Knežević	11	1	8+3	1	0	0
21	DF	(Kazakhstan) KAZ	Kairat Nurdauletov	18	0	15+2	0	1	0
22	MF	(Kazakhstan) KAZ	Kirill Shestakov	23	1	15+6	1	2	0
23	DF	(Kazakhstan) KAZ	Olzhas Altaev	6	0	5+1	0	0	0
24	MF	(Kazakhstan) KAZ	Jan Vorogovsky	24	1	12+11	1	1	0
27	MF	(Belarus) BLR	Anton Matveenko	12	0	10+2	0	0	0
28	FW	(Estonia) EST	Rimo Hunt	23	1	9+14	1	0	0
30	DF	(Kazakhstan) KAZ	Sergey Keiler	15	0	14	0	1	0
35	GK	(Kazakhstan) KAZ	Ramil Nurmukhametov	5	0	4	0	1	0
44	DF	(Czech Republic) CZE	Martin Klein	31	1	30	1	1	0
70	MF	(Kazakhstan) KAZ	Kajsar Balımbetov	1	0	0	0	1	0
77	MF	(Kazakhstan) KAZ	Ilia Kalinin	8	1	8	1	0	0
	MF	(Kazakhstan) KAZ	Samat Balymbetov	1	0	0+1	0	0	0
Players away from Kaisar on loan:
Players who appeared for Kaisar that left during the season:
7	MF	(Kazakhstan) KAZ	Serikzhan Muzhikov	19	0	13+4	0	1+1	0
10	MF	(Kazakhstan) KAZ	Sergei Skorykh	8	0	4+2	0	2	0
20	MF	(Ukraine) UKR	Vladyslav Nekhtiy	12	0	8+2	0	2	0
25	DF	(Bulgaria) BUL	Plamen Dimov	2	1	2	1	0	0
31	DF	(Kazakhstan) KAZ	Aleksei Muldarov	11	2	9	2	2	0
33	FW	(Slovakia) SVK	Juraj Piroska	6	0	5	0	1	0
86	FW	(Croatia) CRO	Edin Junuzovic	17	4	11+5	3	1	1

=== Goal scorers ===
Place	Position	Nation	Number	Name	Premier League	Kazakhstan Cup	Total
1	FW	(Kazakhstan)	17	Zhasulan Moldakaraev	6	0	6
2	FW	(Croatia)	86	Edin Junuzovic	3	1	4
3	DF	(Kazakhstan)	31	Aleksei Muldarov	2	0	2
4	DF	(Bulgaria)	25	Plamen Dimov	1	0	1
4	FW	(Estonia)	28	Rimo Hunt	1	0	1
4	FW	(Russia)	9	Sergei Strukov	1	0	1
4	MF	(Kazakhstan)	24	Jan Vorogovsky	1	0	1
4	MF	(Kazakhstan)	22	Kirill Shestakov	1	0	1
4	MF	(Croatia)	44	Martin Klein	1	0	1
4	DF	(Czech Republic)	19	Josip Knežević	1	0	1
4	MF	(Kazakhstan)	77	Ilia Kalinin	1	0	1
4	DF	(Kazakhstan)	3	Aldan Baltaev	1	0	1
4				Own goal	0	1	1
				TOTALS	20	2	22

=== Disciplinary record ===
Number	Nation	Position	Name	Premier League		Kazakhstan Cup		Total	
Number	Nation	Position	Name	Yellow card	Red card	Yellow card	Red card	Yellow card	Red card
2	(Serbia)	MF	Vuk Mitošević	3	0	0	0	3	0
3	(Kazakhstan)	DF	Aldan Baltaev	3	0	0	0	3	0
6	(Kazakhstan)	MF	Rakhimzhan Rozybakiev	0	1	0	10	0	
7	(Kazakhstan)	MF	Serikzhan Muzhikov	2	0	0	0	2	0
9	(Russia)	FW	Sergei Strukov	3	0	0	0	3	0
11	(Kazakhstan)	FW	Elzhas Altynbekov	1	0	0	0	1	0
14	(Kazakhstan)	DF	Farkhadbek Irismetov	8	1	0	0	8	1
15	(Bulgaria)	FW	Georgi Karaneychev	1	0	0	0	1	0
17	(Kazakhstan)	FW	Zhasulan Moldakaraev	2	0	0	0	2	0
18	(Kazakhstan)	DF	Daniel Choi	1	0	0	0	1	0
19	(Croatia)	MF	Josip Knežević	4	0	0	0	4	0
20	(Ukraine)	MF	Vladyslav Nekhtiy	1	0	0	0	1	0
21	(Kazakhstan)	DF	Kairat Nurdauletov	2	0	0	0	2	0
22	(Kazakhstan)	NF	Kirill Shestakov	5	0	1	0	6	0
24	(Kazakhstan)	MF	Jan Vorogovsky	2	1	0	0	2	1
25	(Bulgaria)	DF	Plamen Dimov	1	0	0	0	1	0
27	(Belarus)	MF	Anton Matsveenka	3	0	0	0	3	0
28	(Estonia)	FW	Rimo Hunt	2	0	0	0	2	0
30	(Kazakhstan)	DF	Sergey Keiler	2	1	0	0	2	1
31	(Kazakhstan)	DF	Aleksei Muldarov	1	0	0	0	1	0
33	(Slovakia)	FW	Juraj Piroska	0	0	1	0	1	0
35	(Kazakhstan)	GK	Ramil Nurmukhametov	1	0	0	0	1	0
44	(Czech Republic)	DF	Martin Klein	4	0	1	0	5	0
86	(Croatia)	FW	Edin Junuzović	2	0	0	0	2	0
			TOTALS	63	3	4	0	67	3
