= 2017 FC Kaisar season =

FC Kaisar
2017 season
- Chairman: Nurlan Abuov
- Manager: Stoycho Mladenov
- Stadium: Gani Muratbayev Stadium
- Kazakhstan Premier League: 6th
- Kazakhstan Cup: Last 16 vs Irtysh Pavlodar
- Top goalscorer: League: Three Players (5); All: Three Players (5)
Home colours	Away colours

The 2017 FC Kaisar season is the club's first season back in the Kazakhstan Premier League, the highest tier of association football in Kazakhstan, after their relegation at the end of the 2015 season and 21st in total. Kaisar will also take part in the Kazakhstan Cup.

== Squad ==
As of 4 July 2017

Note: Flags indicate national team as defined under FIFA eligibility rules; some limited exceptions apply. Players may hold more than one non-FIFA nationality.

No.	Pos.	Nation	Player
3	DF	KAZ	Aldan Baltaev
7	MF	KAZ	Maksat Baizhanov
8	MF	KAZ	Ruslan Sakhalbayev
9	MF	UKR	Volodymyr Arzhanov
10	MF	KAZ	Duman Narzildaev
11	FW	KAZ	Elzhas Altynbekov
13	DF	KAZ	Ilyas Amirseitov
16	GK	KAZ	Aleksandr Grigorenko
17	MF	KAZ	Zhambyl Kukeyev
19	MF	MTQ	Mathias Coureur
21	MF	KAZ	Aybol Zhakhayev
22	DF	KAZ	Bauyrzhan Omarov
23	MF	KAZ	Valeri Korobkin
25	MF	SLE	John Kamara

No.	Pos.	Nation	Player
26	MF	KAZ	Erasyl Seitkanov
27	DF	KAZ	Dmitri Yevstigneyev
31	DF	KAZ	Aleksei Muldarov
32	DF	KAZ	Erbolat Rustemov
33	DF	CMR	Abdel Lamanje
39	MF	BDI	Saidi Ntibazonkiza
55	DF	CRO	Ivan Graf
71	GK	KGZ	Marsel Islamkulov
77	FW	KAZ	Toktar Zhangylyshbay
79	MF	KAZ	Nursultan Abdu
88	DF	KAZ	Valentin Chureyev
90	FW	SRB	Milan Bojović
99	FW	CIV	Franck Dja Djédjé

== Transfers ==
=== Winter ===
In: Note: Flags indicate national team as defined under FIFA eligibility rules; some limited exceptions apply. Players may hold more than one non-FIFA nationality.

No.	Pos.	Nation	Player
1	GK	KAZ	Anton Tsirin (from (Kazakhstan) Irtysh Pavlodar)
7	MF	KAZ	Maksat Baizhanov (from (Kazakhstan) Shakhter Karagandy)
9	MF	UKR	Volodymyr Arzhanov (from (Kazakhstan) Atyrau)
13	DF	KAZ	Ilyas Amirseitov (from (Kazakhstan) Zhetysu)
16	GK	KAZ	Aleksandr Grigorenko (from (Kazakhstan) Taraz)
17	MF	KAZ	Zhambyl Kukeyev
19	MF	MTQ	Mathias Coureur (from (Bulgaria) Lokomotiv GO)
23	MF	KAZ	Valeri Korobkin (from (Kazakhstan) Atyrau)
25	MF	SLE	John Kamara (from (Latvia) Riga)
27	DF	KAZ	Dmitri Yevstigneyev (from (Kazakhstan) Taraz)
31	DF	KAZ	Aleksei Muldarov (from (Kazakhstan) Atyrau)
33	DF	CMR	Abdel Lamanje (from (Kazakhstan) Atyrau)
39	MF	BDI	Saidi Ntibazonkiza
77	DF	KAZ	Yevgeni Goryachi (from (Kazakhstan) Shakhter Karagandy)
88	DF	KAZ	Valentin Chureyev (from (Kazakhstan) Atyrau)
99	FW	MNE	Stefan Nikolić (from (Serbia) Radnik Surdulica)
—	MF	NED	Gregory Nelson

Out: Note: Flags indicate national team as defined under FIFA eligibility rules; some limited exceptions apply. Players may hold more than one non-FIFA nationality.

No.	Pos.	Nation	Player
3	DF	KAZ	Anton Moltusinov (to (Kazakhstan) Taraz)
19	MF	KAZ	Vladimir Vyatkin
77	DF	KAZ	Evgeni Goryachi (to (Kazakhstan) Baikonur)
90	MF	SLO	Matic Maruško (to (Slovenia) Mura 05)
—	MF	NED	Gregory Nelson (to (Bahrain) Al-Muharraq)

=== Summer ===
In: Note: Flags indicate national team as defined under FIFA eligibility rules; some limited exceptions apply. Players may hold more than one non-FIFA nationality.

No.	Pos.	Nation	Player
22	DF	KAZ	Bauyrzhan Omarov (from (Kazakhstan) Akzhayik)
77	FW	KAZ	Toktar Zhangylyshbay (from (Kazakhstan) Tobol)
90	FW	SRB	Milan Bojović (from (Serbia) Mladost Lučani)
99	FW	CIV	Franck Dja Djédjé (from (Kazakhstan) Irtysh Pavlodar)

Out: Note: Flags indicate national team as defined under FIFA eligibility rules; some limited exceptions apply. Players may hold more than one non-FIFA nationality.

No.	Pos.	Nation	Player
1	GK	KAZ	Anton Tsirin
2	DF	KAZ	Olzhas Altaev
99	FW	MNE	Stefan Nikolić (to (Romania) Sepsi Sfântu Gheorghe)

== Competitions ==
=== Kazakhstan Premier League ===
==== Results summary ====
Overall								Home						Away					
Pld	W	D	L	GF	GA	GD	Pts	W	D	L	GF	GA	GD	W	D	L	GF	GA	GD
33	9	10	14	28	36	−8	37	7	5	4	20	17	+3	2	5	10	8	19	−11

Last updated: 5 November 2017.
Source: See Results

==== Results by round ====
Round	1	2	3	4	5	6	7	8	9	10	11	12	13	14	15	16	17	18	19	20	21	22	23	24	25	26	27	28	29	30	31	32	33
Ground	H	H	A	A	H	A	H	A	H	A	H	A	H	H	A	H	A	H	A	H	A	A	H	A	H	A	H	A	H	A	H	A	A
Result	W	W	W	D	D	L	D	L	L	L	W	L	W	L	D	L	L	D	L	W	D	L	W	D	D	L	L	W	W	L	W	D	W
Position	5	1	1	2	2	5	6	6	6	7	6	6	6	6	6	6	6	6	6	6	7	9	7	6	6	6	7	7	6	7	7	7	6

Source: See Results
A = Away; H = Home; W = Win; D = Draw; L = Loss

==== Results ====
8 March 2017 1	Kaisar	1 – 0	Okzhetpes	Kyzylorda
15:00 (UTC+6)	Graf (yellow card) 57'; Nikolić 90+2' (pen.)	Report	N.Dairov (yellow card) 71'; Fedin (yellow card) 76'; S.Keyler (yellow card) 90+3'	Stadium: Gani Muratbayev Stadium; Attendance: 4,200; Referee: Marat Iskakov

12 March 2017 2	Kaisar	2 – 1	Taraz	Kyzylorda
15:00 (UTC+6)	Arzhanov 34'; Ntibazonkiza 71'	Report	Mukhametshin 15'; Gorbanets (yellow card) 31' (yellow-red card) 80'	Stadium: Gani Muratbayev Stadium; Attendance: 3,500; Referee: Grigory Moskovchenko

18 March 2017 3	Shakhter Karagandy	0 – 1	Kaisar	Astana
18:00 (UTC+6)	Tazhimbetov (yellow card) 9'; Stojanović (yellow card) 70'; M.Gabyshev (yellow card) 86'	Report	Arzhanov 23'; D.Yevstigneyev (yellow card) 80'; Ntibazonkiza (yellow card) 90+1'	Stadium: Astana Arena; Attendance: 2,000; Referee: Greorgiy Chekhovskiy

31 March 2017 4	Kairat	1 – 1	Kaisar	Almaty
19:30 (UTC+6)	Gohou 11'; Arshavin (yellow card) 23'; Arzo (yellow card) 82'	Report	Graf (yellow card) 5'; Baizhanov 35'; Nikolić (yellow card) 46'; Arzhanov (yellow card) 55'; Kamara (yellow card) 74'	Stadium: Central Stadium; Attendance: 14,000; Referee: Denis Tevyashov

8 April 2017 5	Kaisar	0 – 0	Tobol	Kyzylorda
16:00 (UTC+6)	Narzildaev (yellow card) 45+1'; Kamara (yellow card) 63'	Report	D.Miroshnichenko (yellow card) 38'; Moldakaraev (yellow card) 82'	Stadium: Gani Muratbayev Stadium; Attendance: 3,640; Referee: Artyom Kuchin

12 April 2017 6	Ordabasy	1 – 0	Kaisar	Shymkent
15:00 (UTC+6)	E.Tungyshbaev (yellow card) 28'; Martsvaladze 51'	Report	Narzildaev (yellow card) 9'; D.Yevstigneyev (yellow card) 36'; Lamanje (yellow card) 39'; Korobkin (yellow card) 64'	Stadium: Kazhymukan Munaitpasov Stadium; Attendance: 4,000; Referee: Aleksandr Gauzer

16 April 2017 7	Kaisar	1 – 1	Irtysh Pavlodar	Kyzylorda
16:00 (UTC+6)	D.Yevstigneyev (yellow card) 25'; Korobkin (yellow card) 45+1'; Kamara (yellow card) 77'; Ntibazonkiza 86'	Report	Aliev (yellow card) 14'; António (yellow card) 41' (goal) 83'	Stadium: Gani Muratbayev Stadium; Attendance: 5,000; Referee: Aleksei Bobrov

23 April 2017 8	Akzhayik	1 – 0	Kaisar	Oral
18:00 (UTC+6)	D.Schmidt (yellow card) 36'; Valiullin 56'; K.Zarechny (yellow card) 79'; Azuka (yellow card) 90+2'	Report		Stadium: Petr Atoyan Stadium; Attendance: 2,000; Referee: Askhat Abdanbayev

29 April 2017 9	Kaisar	0 – 3	Astana	Kyzylorda
16:00 (UTC+6)	Nikolić (yellow card) 30'; M.Islamkulov (red card) 73'	Report	Twumasi 28'; Mayewski 34'; Aničić (yellow card) 48'; Beisebekov (yellow card) 61'; Murtazayev 76' (pen.)	Stadium: Gani Muratbayev Stadium; Attendance: 5,000; Referee: Igor Aleshin

2 May 2017 10	Atyrau	1 – 0	Kaisar	Atyrau
18:00 (UTC+6)	Maksimović 49' (pen.); D.Kayralliyev (yellow card) 90+4'	Report	Graf (yellow card) 78'; V.Chureyev (yellow card) 89'	Stadium: Munaishy Stadium; Attendance: 2,500; Referee: Marat Iskakov

6 May 2017 11	Kaisar	3 – 2	Aktobe	Kyzylorda
18:00 (UTC+6)	Arzhanov 16', 41'; Lamanje (yellow card) 80'; V.Chureyev (yellow card) 85'; Kamara (yellow card) 86'; Baizhanov 90+3' (pen.)	Report	Júnior (yellow card) 19' (goal) 50'; B.Aitbayev (yellow card) 32'; Zyankovich 56'; Gueye (red card) 90'	Stadium: Gani Muratbayev Stadium; Attendance: 2,000; Referee: Denis Tevyashov

14 May 2017 12	Taraz	2 – 1	Kaisar	Taraz
19:00 (UTC+6)	Gorbanets (yellow card) 55' (yellow-red card) 60'; Diarra 69'; A.Taubay 74'	Report	Coureur (yellow card) 37'; M.Bayzhanov 45'; D.Yevstigneyev (yellow card) 90'	Stadium: Central Stadium; Attendance: 5,000; Referee: Aydin Rakhimbayev

20 May 2017 13	Kaisar	2 – 1	Shakhter Karagandy	Kyzylorda
18:00 (UTC+6)	Kamara (yellow card) 26'; E.Altynbekov 53'; Arzhanov (yellow card) 60'; E.Goryachi (yellow card) 68'; Narzildaev (yellow card) 74'; Korobkin 83'	Report	Stanojević 24'; Y.Baginskiy (yellow card) 83'	Stadium: Gani Muratbayev Stadium; Attendance: 2,000; Referee: Bagdat Abdullaev

28 May 2017 14	Kaisar	1 – 2	Kairat	Kyzylorda
18:00 (UTC+6)	E.Altynbekov (yellow card) 6'; Coureur 9'; Muldarov (yellow card) 31'; Korobkin (yellow card) 52'	Report	Islamkhan 32'; Gohou 36'	Stadium: Gani Muratbayev Stadium; Attendance: 2,500; Referee: Anatoliy Vishnichenko

3 June 2017 15	Tobol	0 – 0	Kaisar	Kostanay
16:00 (UTC+6)	S.Zharynbektov (yellow card) 45+1'; T.Zhakupov (yellow card) 54'	Report	Ntibazonkiza (yellow card) 12'; A.Zhakhayev (yellow card) 29'; Graf (yellow card) 60'	Stadium: Stadion Zatobolets; Attendance: 2,000; Referee: Aleksandr Aliyev

17 June 2017 16	Kaisar	0 – 1	Ordabasy	Kyzylorda
19:00 (UTC+6)	Kamara (yellow card) 34'; D.Yevstigneyev (yellow card) 37'; Muldarov (yellow card) 68'; Lamanje (yellow card) 90'; Narzildaev (yellow card) 90+3'	Report	Kovalchuk (yellow card) 45+1'; Fontanello 58'	Stadium: Gani Muratbayev Stadium; Attendance: 1,600; Referee: Aydin Rakhimbayev

24 June 2017 17	Irtysh Pavlodar	1 – 0	Kaisar	Pavlodar
19:00 (UTC+6)	Živković (yellow card) 16' (goal) 57' (pen.)	Report	D.Yevstigneyev (yellow card) 19'; Korobkin (yellow card) 23' (yellow-red card) 60'; Baizhanov (yellow card) 25'; I.Amirseitov (yellow card) 51'; Arzhanov (yellow card) 54'	Stadium: Central Stadium; Attendance: 2,800; Referee: Denis Tevyashov

1 July 2017 18	Kaisar	0 – 0	Akzhayik	Kyzylorda
19:00 (UTC+6)	I.Amirseitov (yellow card) 29'; D.Yevstigneyev (yellow card) 59'	Report	Glavina (yellow card) 15'; Govedarica (yellow card) 33'	Stadium: Gani Muratbayev Stadium; Attendance: 1,500; Referee: Askhat Abdanbayev

6 July 2017 19	Astana	2 – 0	Kaisar	Astana
18:30 (UTC+6)	Twumasi 14'; Logvinenko 70'	Report	Muldarov (yellow card) 68'	Stadium: Astana Arena; Attendance: 7,000; Referee: Igor Aleshin

15 July 2017 20	Kaisar	2 – 0	Atyrau	Kyzylorda
19:00 (UTC+6)	Graf 33'; Arzhanov (yellow card) 51'; Coureur 90+3' (pen.)	Report	Tazhimbetov (yellow card) 58'; Sikimić (yellow card) 78'; D.Mazhitov (yellow card) 89'	Stadium: Gani Muratbayev Stadium; Attendance: 1,300; Referee: Artyom Kuchin

22 July 2017 21	Aktobe	1 – 1	Kaisar	Aktobe
21:00 (UTC+6)	B.Kairov (yellow card) 53'; Obradović 72'	Report	Kamara 18'; Korobkin (yellow card) 38'; Zhangylyshbay (yellow card) 66'; Bojović (yellow card) 88'	Stadium: Central Stadium; Attendance: 11,000; Referee: Bagdat Abdullaev

30 July 2017 22	Okzhetpes	3 – 1	Kaisar	Shchuchinsk
18:00 (UTC+6)	Marochkin 15'; Volkov 30'; Abdulin (yellow card) 42'; Kozlov 81'; Hoshkoderya (yellow card) 88'	Report	Zhangylyshbay (yellow card) 32'; Coureur 68'; Baizhanov (yellow card) 88' (yellow-red card) 90'	Stadium: Zhaksy Stadium; Attendance: 300; Referee: Bolat Karlibayev

12 August 2017 23	Kaisar	1 – 0	Tobol	Kyzylorda
18:30 (UTC+6)	D.Yevstigneyev (yellow card) 11'; Korobkin (yellow card) 23'; Coureur (yellow card) 38'; Dja Djédjé 55'; Grigorenko (yellow card) 90+1'	Report	Mukhutdinov (yellow card) 4'	Stadium: Gani Muratbayev Stadium; Attendance: 1,500; Referee: Marat Iskakov

20 August 2017 24	Irtysh Pavlodar	0 – 0	Kaisar	Pavlodar
19:30 (UTC+6)	Aliev (yellow card) 21'; Stamenković (yellow card) 57' (yellow-red card) 71'	Report	I.Amirseitov (yellow card) 25'; M.Bayzhanov (yellow card) 31'; Coureur (yellow card) 31'; Korobkin (yellow card) 71'; Graf (yellow card) 90+1'	Stadium: Central Stadium; Attendance: 3,500; Referee: Furkat Atajanov

26 August 2017 25	Kaisar	1 – 1	Ordabasy	Kyzylorda
18:00 (UTC+6)	V.Chureyev (yellow card) 54'; Bojović 65' (yellow card) 78'	Report	Diakate (yellow card) 65'; Simčević (yellow card) 72'; Smakov (yellow card) 77' (goal) 90+4'	Stadium: Gani Muratbayev Stadium; Attendance: 1,300; Referee: Georgiy Chekhovskiy

10 September 2017 26	Kairat	3 – 1	Kaisar	Almaty
18:00 (UTC+6)	Isael 14'; Islamkhan 18'; Plotnikov (yellow card) 25'; Arshavin 90+2'	Report	Bojović (yellow card) 22'; Coureur 40' (yellow card) 88'; Kamara (yellow card) 55'	Stadium: Central Stadium; Attendance: 9,000; Referee: Aleksei Bobrov

18 September 2017 27	Kaisar	1 – 4	Astana	Kyzylorda
17:30 (UTC+6)	Zhangylyshbay 46'; Muldarov (yellow card) 55'; R.Sakhalbayev (yellow card) 75'	Report	Grahovac 60'; Shitov 65'; Logvinenko 76'; Tagybergen 90'	Stadium: Gani Muratbayev Stadium; Attendance: 1,500; Referee: Denis Tevyashov

24 September 2017 28	Aktobe	0 – 1	Kaisar	Aktobe
17:00 (UTC+6)	B.Kairov (yellow card) 59'; Simović (yellow card) 74'	Report	Korobkin (yellow card) 3'; M.Bayzhanov 10'; Graf (yellow card) 19'; Lamanje (yellow card) 44'; Grigorenko (yellow card) 90+4'	Stadium: Central Stadium; Attendance: 1,700; Referee: Timur Kumashev

30 September 2017 29	Kaisar	2 – 1	Okzhetpes	Kyzylorda
16:00 (UTC+6)	Muldarov 38'; Zhangylyshbay 87'	Report	Volkov (yellow card) 5'; I.Amirseitov 13' (o.g.); Gogua (yellow card) 35'; Hoshkoderya (yellow card) 60'	Stadium: Gani Muratbayev Stadium; Attendance: 2,000; Referee: Aleksei Bobrov

15 October 2017 30	Shakhter Karagandy	2 – 1	Kaisar	Karaganda
16:00 (UTC+6)	Dmitrenko (yellow card) 29'; Zošák 31'; Stojanović 47'	Report	Zhangylyshbay (yellow card) 43' (goal) 77'; Muldarov (yellow card) 60'; Coureur (yellow card) 90+3'	Stadium: Shakhter Stadium; Attendance: 1,500; Referee: Ruslan Omaroo

22 October 2017 31	Kaisar	4 – 1	Atyrau	Kyzylorda
15:00 (UTC+6)	M.Bayzhanov 54'; Arzhanov 62'; Graf (yellow card) 83'; Coureur 86'; Lamanje 90'	Report	Maksimović 45+1'; D.Kayralliev (yellow card) 64'	Stadium: Gani Muratbayev Stadium; Attendance: 2,000; Referee: Aleksandr Gauzer

28 October 2017 32	Akzhayik	0 – 0	Kaisar	Oral
15:00 (UTC+6)	A.Ersalimov (yellow card) 90+1'	Report	V.Chureyev (yellow card) 23'; Korobkin (yellow card) 63'; Kamara (yellow card) 75'	Stadium: Petr Atoyan Stadium; Attendance: 1,100; Referee: Aleksei Bobrov

5 November 2017 33	Taraz	0 – 1	Kaisar	Taraz
15:00 (UTC+6)	Feshchuk (yellow card) 40'; Ergashev (yellow card) 75'	Report	D.Yevstigneyev 57'; Bojović (yellow card) 75' (red card) 81'; A.Zhakhayev (yellow card) 83'; Graf (yellow card) 85'	Stadium: Central Stadium; Attendance: 1,000; Referee: Grigory Moskovchenko

==== League table ====
Pos	Team	Pld	W	D	L	GF	GA	GD	Pts	Qualification or relegation
4	Irtysh Pavlodar	33	12	12	9	35	32	+3	48	Qualification for the Europa League first qualifying round (Note: Ordabasy would have qualified too, but they failed to obtain a licence, so Tobol took their place.)
5	Tobol	33	12	11	10	36	26	+10	47	Qualification for the Europa League first qualifying round
6	Kaisar	33	11	9	13	30	36	−6	42	
7	Shakhter Karagandy	33	12	4	17	36	50	−14	40	
8	Atyrau (Note: Atyrau started the season with –9 points as a punishment for unpaid debts to former manager Zoran Filipović. On 24 April 2017, Atyrau had six points returned to after they cleared their debt to Filipović, with three points retained due to debts to Jonathas.)	33	10	8	15	34	54	−20	35	

Source: UEFA, Soccerway
Rules for classification: 1) Points; 2) Head-to-head points; 3) Head-to-head matches won; 4) Head-to-head goal difference; 5) Head-to-head goals scored; 6) Head-to-head away goals scored; 7) Goal difference; 8) Matches won; 9) Goals scored; 10) Away goals scored; 11) Draw.

=== Kazakhstan Cup ===
19 April 2017 Last 16	Irtysh Pavlodar	3 – 2 (a.e.t.)	Kaisar	Pavlodar
19:00 (UTC+6)	Fofana 31'; Chernyshov (yellow card) 65'; Dja Djédjé 82'; António 110'; Kislitsyn (yellow card) 119'	Summary	Kukeyev (yellow card) 30' (yellow-red card) 120+3'; R.Sakhalbayev (yellow card) 63' (yellow-red card) 73'; Narzildaev 66'; E.Goryachi (yellow card) 73'; E.Altynbekov 79'; A.Zhakhayev (yellow card) 82'; E.Seitkanov (yellow card) 87'; Muldarov (yellow card) 115'; Grigorenko (yellow card) 115'; O.Altaev (yellow card) 116'	Stadium: Central Stadium; Attendance: 6,000; Referee: Aleksandr Aliyev

== Squad statistics ==
As of Match played 5 November 2017

=== Appearances and goals ===
No.	Pos	Nat	Player	Total		Premier League		Kazakhstan Cup	
No.	Pos	Nat	Player	Apps	Goals	Apps	Goals	Apps	Goals
3	DF	(Kazakhstan) KAZ	Aldan Baltaev	1	0	0+1	0	0	0
7	MF	(Kazakhstan) KAZ	Maksat Baizhanov	31	5	31	5	0	0
8	MF	(Kazakhstan) KAZ	Ruslan Sakhalbayev	17	0	3+13	0	1	0
9	MF	(Ukraine) UKR	Volodymyr Arzhanov	31	5	29+2	5	0	0
10	MF	(Kazakhstan) KAZ	Duman Narzildaev	24	1	15+8	0	1	1
11	FW	(Kazakhstan) KAZ	Elzhas Altynbekov	17	2	2+14	1	1	1
13	DF	(Kazakhstan) KAZ	Ilyas Amirseitov	23	0	23	0	0	0
16	GK	(Kazakhstan) KAZ	Aleksandr Grigorenko	19	0	17+1	0	1	0
17	MF	(Kazakhstan) KAZ	Zhambyl Kukeyev	10	0	2+7	0	1	0
19	FW	(Martinique) MTQ	Mathias Coureur	33	5	29+3	5	1	0
21	DF	(Kazakhstan) KAZ	Aybol Zhakhayev	9	0	5+3	0	1	0
23	MF	(Kazakhstan) KAZ	Valeri Korobkin	25	1	20+5	1	0	0
25	MF	(Sierra Leone) SLE	John Kamara	30	1	30	1	0	0
26	MF	(Kazakhstan) KAZ	Erasyl Seitkanov	1	0	0	0	0+1	0
27	DF	(Kazakhstan) KAZ	Dmitri Yevstigneyev	26	1	24+2	1	0	0
31	DF	(Kazakhstan) KAZ	Aleksei Muldarov	14	1	7+6	1	1	0
32	DF	(Kazakhstan) KAZ	Erbolat Rustemov	1	0	0	0	0+1	0
33	DF	(Cameroon) CMR	Abdel Lamanje	30	1	29+1	1	0	0
39	MF	(Burundi) BDI	Saidi Ntibazonkiza	10	2	4+6	2	0	0
55	DF	(Croatia) CRO	Ivan Graf	31	1	31	1	0	0
71	GK	(Kyrgyzstan) KGZ	Marsel Islamkulov	16	0	16	0	0	0
77	FW	(Kazakhstan) KAZ	Toktar Zhangylyshbay	12	3	8+4	3	0	0
79	MF	(Kazakhstan) KAZ	Nursultan Abdu	1	0	0	0	0+1	0
88	DF	(Kazakhstan) KAZ	Valentin Chureyev	16	0	13+2	0	1	0
90	FW	(Serbia) SRB	Milan Bojović	13	1	5+8	1	0	0
99	FW	(Ivory Coast) CIV	Franck Dja Djédjé	11	1	8+3	1	0	0
Players away from Kaisar on loan:
Players who left Kaisar during the season:
2	DF	(Kazakhstan) KAZ	Olzhas Altaev	1	0	0	0	1	0
77	DF	(Kazakhstan) KAZ	Evgeni Goryachi	2	0	1	0	1	0
99	FW	(Montenegro) MNE	Stefan Nikolić	13	1	11+2	1	0	0

=== Goal scorers ===
Place	Position	Nation	Number	Name	Premier League	Kazakhstan Cup	Total
1	MF	(Ukraine)	9	Volodymyr Arzhanov	5	0	5
1	FW	(Martinique)	19	Mathias Coureur	5	0	5
1	MF	(Kazakhstan)	7	Maksat Baizhanov	5	0	5
4	FW	(Kazakhstan)	77	Toktar Zhangylyshbay	3	0	3
5	MF	(Burundi)	39	Saidi Ntibazonkiza	2	0	2
5	FW	(Kazakhstan)	11	Elzhas Altynbekov	1	1	2
7	FW	(Montenegro)	99	Stefan Nikolić	1	0	1
7	MF	(Kazakhstan)	23	Valeri Korobkin	1	0	1
7	DF	(Croatia)	55	Ivan Graf	1	0	1
7	MF	(Sierra Leone)	25	John Kamara	1	0	1
7	FW	(Ivory Coast)	99	Franck Dja Djédjé	1	0	1
7	FW	(Serbia)	90	Milan Bojović	1	0	1
7	DF	(Kazakhstan)	31	Aleksei Muldarov	1	0	1
7	DF	(Cameroon)	33	Abdel Lamanje	1	0	1
7	DF	(Kazakhstan)	27	Dmitri Yevstigneyev	1	0	1
7	MF	(Kazakhstan)	10	Duman Narzildaev	0	1	1
				TOTALS	30	2	32

=== Disciplinary record ===
Number	Nation	Position	Name	Premier League		Kazakhstan Cup		Total	
Number	Nation	Position	Name	Yellow card	Red card	Yellow card	Red card	Yellow card	Red card
2	(Kazakhstan)	DF	Olzhas Altaev	0	0	1	0	1	0
7	(Kazakhstan)	MF	Maksat Baizhanov	4	1	0	0	4	1
8	(Kazakhstan)	MF	Ruslan Sakhalbayev	1	0	2	1	3	1
9	(Ukraine)	MF	Volodymyr Arzhanov	4	0	0	0	4	0
10	(Kazakhstan)	MF	Duman Narzildaev	4	0	0	0	4	0
11	(Kazakhstan)	FW	Elzhas Altynbekov	1	0	0	0	1	0
13	(Kazakhstan)	DF	Ilyas Amirseitov	3	0	0	0	3	0
16	(Kazakhstan)	GK	Aleksandr Grigorenko	2	0	1	0	3	0
17	(Kazakhstan)	MF	Zhambyl Kukeyev	0	0	1	1	1	1
19	(Martinique)	FW	Mathias Coureur	5	0	0	0	5	0
21	(Kazakhstan)	MF	Aybol Zhakhayev	2	0	1	0	3	0
23	(Kazakhstan)	MF	Valeri Korobkin	10	1	0	0	10	1
25	(Sierra Leone)	MF	John Kamara	8	0	0	0	8	0
26	(Kazakhstan)	MF	Erasyl Seitkanov	0	0	1	0	1	0
27	(Kazakhstan)	DF	Dmitri Yevstigneyev	8	0	0	0	8	0
31	(Kazakhstan)	DF	Aleksei Muldarov	5	0	1	0	6	0
33	(Cameroon)	DF	Abdel Lamanje	4	0	0	0	4	0
39	(Burundi)	MF	Saidi Ntibazonkiza	2	0	0	0	2	0
55	(Croatia)	DF	Ivan Graf	8	0	0	0	8	0
71	(Kyrgyzstan)	GK	Marsel Islamkulov	0	1	0	0	0	1
77	(Kazakhstan)	DF	Evgeni Goryachi	1	0	1	0	2	0
77	(Kazakhstan)	FW	Toktar Zhangylyshbay	3	0	0	0	3	0
88	(Kazakhstan)	DF	Valentin Chureyev	3	0	1	0	4	0
90	(Serbia)	FW	Milan Bojović	4	1	0	0	4	1
99	(Montenegro)	FW	Stefan Nikolić	2	0	0	0	2	0
			TOTALS	85	4	9	2	94	6
