= Irismetov =

Irismetov is a surname. Notable people with the surname include:

- Farkhadbek Irismetov (born 1981), Kazakhstani footballer
- Jafar Irismetov (born 1976), Uzbekistani footballer and coach
