= 2016 FC Atyrau season =

FC Atyrau
2016 season
- Chairman: Zheksenbai Kusainov
- Manager: Vladimir Nikitenko
- Stadium: Munaishy Stadium
- Kazakhstan Premier League: 8th
- Kazakhstan Cup: Semifinal vs Kairat
- Top goalscorer: League: Volodymyr Arzhanov (8); All: Volodymyr Arzhanov (9)
Home colours	Away colours

The 2016 FC Atyrau season is the 16th successive season that the club will play in the Kazakhstan Premier League, the highest tier of association football in Kazakhstan.

== Squad ==
As of 11 July 2016

Note: Flags indicate national team as defined under FIFA eligibility rules; some limited exceptions apply. Players may hold more than one non-FIFA nationality.

No.	Pos.	Nation	Player
1	GK	KAZ	Azamat Zhomart
2	DF	KAZ	Aldan Baltaev
3	DF	KAZ	Aleksei Muldarov
6	MF	KAZ	Altynbek Saparov
5	MF	KAZ	Aleksei Marov
7	MF	CMR	Guy Essame
8	DF	KAZ	Valentin Chureyev
9	MF	UKR	Volodymyr Arzhanov
10	MF	KAZ	Pavel Shabalin
11	MF	UKR	Vyacheslav Sharpar
12	DF	KAZ	Ruslan Esatov
13	FW	BLR	Alyaksandr Makas
14	MF	KAZ	Nauryzbek Zhagora
16	FW	KAZ	Aybolat Maku

No.	Pos.	Nation	Player
17	MF	KAZ	Ulan Konysbayev
19	MF	KAZ	Valeri Korobkin
21	DF	MKD	Aleksandar Damčevski
25	MF	KAZ	Bekzhan Onzhan
26	FW	POL	Przemysław Trytko
28	DF	KAZ	Vladislav Kuzmin
29	DF	KAZ	Berik Aitbayev
30	MF	ROU	Alexandru Curtean
33	DF	FRA	Abdel Lamanje
34	GK	KAZ	Zhasur Narzikulov
35	GK	KAZ	Ramil Nurmukhametov
77	FW	KAZ	Kuanish Kalmuratov
96	MF	KAZ	Maxim Fedin

=== Reserve team ===
Note: Flags indicate national team as defined under FIFA eligibility rules; some limited exceptions apply. Players may hold more than one non-FIFA nationality.

No.	Pos.	Nation	Player
4	DF	KAZ	Nauryzbek Kalybai
25	MF	KAZ	Islam Satiev
27	MF	KAZ	Abilmansur Rochet
30	MF	KAZ	Mohammed Saktash
32	MF	KAZ	Aidos Ershmanov
37	DF	KAZ	Ruslan Muftolla
47	MF	KAZ	Alikhan Otaraly

No.	Pos.	Nation	Player
61	MF	KAZ	Vyacheslav Borovoy
63	GK	KAZ	Baibek Tusipov
74	MF	KAZ	Rinat Jumati
79	DF	KAZ	Alisher Akyns
88	MF	KAZ	Rafael Ospanov
95	DF	KAZ	Timur Sundetov
97	DF	KAZ	Zharas Mellyatov

== Transfers ==
=== Winter ===
In: Note: Flags indicate national team as defined under FIFA eligibility rules; some limited exceptions apply. Players may hold more than one non-FIFA nationality.

No.	Pos.	Nation	Player
2	DF	KAZ	Aldan Baltaev (from (Kazakhstan) Kaisar)
3	DF	KAZ	Aleksei Muldarov (from (Kazakhstan) Shakhter Karagandy)
10	MF	KAZ	Pavel Shabalin (from (Kazakhstan) Okzhetpes)
11	MF	UKR	Vyacheslav Sharpar (from (Ukraine) Volyn Lutsk)
13	FW	BLR	Alyaksandr Makas (from (Belarus) Minsk)
17	MF	KAZ	Ulan Konysbayev (from (Kazakhstan) Astana)
19	MF	KAZ	Valeri Korobkin (from (Kazakhstan) Aktobe)
21	DF	MKD	Aleksandar Damčevski
26	FW	POL	Przemysław Trytko (from (Poland) Korona Kielce)
30	MF	ROU	Alexandru Curtean (from (Romania) Poli Timișoara)
33	DF	FRA	Abdel Lamanje (from (Russia) Shinnik Yaroslavl)
35	GK	KAZ	Ramil Nurmukhametov (from (Kazakhstan) Kaisar)

Out: Note: Flags indicate national team as defined under FIFA eligibility rules; some limited exceptions apply. Players may hold more than one non-FIFA nationality.

No.	Pos.	Nation	Player
1	GK	KAZ	Ilya Bayteryakov
5	MF	KAZ	Bekzhan Onzhan
10	MF	KAZ	Konstantin Zarechny
11	MF	KAZ	Maksat Baizhanov (to (Kazakhstan) Shakhter Karagandy)
20	DF	NGR	Michael Odibe (to (Romania) Concordia Chiajna)
22	MF	SEN	Abdoulaye Diakate (to (Kazakhstan) Ordabasy)
23	DF	RUS	Anton Grigoryev
24	FW	UKR	Ruslan Fomin (to (Greece) Apollon Smyrnis)
29	DF	KAZ	Berik Aitbayev (to (Kazakhstan) Taraz)
39	FW	KAZ	Murat Tleshev
66	DF	KAZ	Anton Chichulin (to (Kazakhstan) Okzhetpes)
85	MF	BLR	Dmitri Parkhachev (to (Belarus) Gorodeya)
91	DF	KAZ	Azamat Izbasarov
99	FW	MNE	Ivan Ivanović (to (Montenegro) Rudar Pljevlja)

=== Summer ===
In: Note: Flags indicate national team as defined under FIFA eligibility rules; some limited exceptions apply. Players may hold more than one non-FIFA nationality.

No.	Pos.	Nation	Player
29	DF	KAZ	Berik Aitbayev (from (Kazakhstan) Taraz)
96	MF	KAZ	Maxim Fedin (from (Serbia) Spartak Subotica)

Out: Note: Flags indicate national team as defined under FIFA eligibility rules; some limited exceptions apply. Players may hold more than one non-FIFA nationality.

No.	Pos.	Nation	Player

== Friendlies ==
16 January 2016	Wil 1900 (Switzerland)	2 – 1	(Kazakhstan) Atyrau	Antalya, Turkey
(UTC+6)	Roux; B.Stillhart	Summary	Arzhanov (pen.)

18 January 2016	Petrolul Ploiești (Romania)	0 – 0	(Kazakhstan) Atyrau	Antalya, Turkey
(UTC+6)		Summary

26 January 2016	Jagiellonia Białystok (Poland)	0 – 0	(Kazakhstan) Atyrau	Antalya, Turkey
(UTC+6)		Summary

28 January 2016	Fastav Zlín (Czech Republic)	3 – 2	(Kazakhstan) Atyrau	Antalya, Turkey
(UTC+6)	Goal	Summary	Arzhanov; Sharpar

6 February 2016	Lokomotiv Plovdiv (Bulgaria)	1 – 4	(Kazakhstan) Atyrau	Antalya, Turkey
(UTC+6)	Goal	Summary	Shabalin 1'; Sharpar 11'

8 February 2016	Rudar Pljevlja (Montenegro)	1 – 6	(Kazakhstan) Atyrau	Antalya, Turkey
19:00 (UTC+6)	23'	Summary	Arzhanov; Shabalin 55'; Trialist; Trialist; Trialist; Sharpar 82'

11 February 2016	ViOn Zlaté Moravce (Slovakia)	1 – 1	(Kazakhstan) Atyrau	Antalya, Turkey
18:00 (UTC+6)	32' (pen.)	Summary	H.Harb 42'

13 February 2016	Spartak Trnava (Slovakia)	1 – 1	(Kazakhstan) Atyrau	Antalya, Turkey
19:00 (UTC+6)	76'	Summary	Trialist 90+'

16 February 2016	Oleksandriya (Ukraine)	0 – 0	(Kazakhstan) Atyrau	Antalya, Turkey
(UTC+6)		Summary

24 February 2016	Minsk-2 (Ukraine)	2 – 2	(Kazakhstan) Atyrau	Antalya, Turkey
(UTC+6)	Goal	Summary	Makas; Trytko

26 February 2016	Aşgabat (Turkmenistan)	1 – 2	(Kazakhstan) Atyrau	Antalya, Turkey
(UTC+6)	(pen.)	Summary	Korobkin; Sharpar

29 February 2016	Hoverla Uzhhorod (Ukraine)	3 – 0	(Kazakhstan) Atyrau	Antalya, Turkey
(UTC+6)	Goal	Summary

== Competitions ==
=== Kazakhstan Premier League ===
==== Regular season ====
===== Results summary =====
Overall								Home						Away					
Pld	W	D	L	GF	GA	GD	Pts	W	D	L	GF	GA	GD	W	D	L	GF	GA	GD
22	7	7	8	21	21	0	28	5	4	2	10	6	+4	2	3	6	11	15	−4

Last updated: 26 July 2016.
Source: See Results

===== Results by round =====
Round	1	2	3	4	5	6	7	8	9	10	11	12	13	14	15	16	17	18	19	20	21	22
Ground	A	A	H	A	H	A	A	H	A	H	A	H	A	H	A	H	H	H	A	H	A	H
Result	D	L	L	L	W	D	D	D	L	W	W	L	L	W	W	W	D	D	L	D	L	W
Position	6	11	11	12	11	11	8	9	9	8	7	8	8	8	7	6	6	7	7	7	8	7

Source: See results
A = Away; H = Home; W = Win; D = Draw; L = Loss

===== Results =====
12 March 2016 1	Zhetysu	1 – 1	Atyrau	Taldykorgan
15:00 (UTC+6)	Goa (yellow card) 40'; Turysbek 60'	Summary	Konysbayev 19'; V.Kuzmin (yellow card) 53'; Makas (yellow card) 56'	Stadium: Zhetysu Stadium; Attendance: 2,000; Referee: Aydin Rakhimbayev

19 March 2016 2	Atyrau	Postponed	Tobol	Atyrau
16:00 (UTC+6)		[ Summary]		Stadium: Munaishy Stadium

3 April 2016 3	Irtysh Pavlodar	3 – 0	Atyrau	Pavlodar
15:00 (UTC+6)	Loria (yellow card) 7'; R.Yesimov (yellow card) 30'; R.Murtazayev 50'; Malyi 59'; Gogua 82'	Summary	Trytko (yellow card) 7'; V.Kuzmin (yellow card) 29' (yellow-red card) 64'; Essame (yellow card) 64'; Muldarov (yellow card) 90'	Stadium: Central Stadium; Attendance: 5,000; Referee: Akmalkhan Kholmatov

9 April 2016 4	Atyrau	0 – 1	Kairat	Atyrau
16:00 (UTC+6)		Summary	Gohou 58'; T.Rudoselskiy (yellow card) 69'; V.Li (yellow card) 78'	Stadium: Munaishy Stadium; Attendance: 1,500; Referee: Marat Iskakov

13 April 2016 5	Okzhetpes	2 – 0	Atyrau	Astana
17:00 (UTC+6)	Chichulin (yellow card) 25'; Khayrullin 43'; Chyzhov (yellow card) 43'; Z.Moldakaraev 59'	Summary	Curtean (yellow card) 18'; Shabalin (yellow card) 39'; Korobkin (yellow card) 57'; R.Esatov (yellow card) 90+1'	Stadium: Astana Arena; Attendance: 1,500; Referee: Aleksandr Aliyev

17 April 2016 6	Atyrau	2 – 0	Akzhayik	Atyrau
17:00 (UTC+6)	Shabalin 4'; Trytko 19'	Summary	Govedarica (yellow card) 42'; Sergienko (yellow card) 61'	Stadium: Munaishy Stadium; Attendance: 1,200; Referee: Sergey Gorokhovodatskiy

23 April 2016 7	Taraz	0 – 0	Atyrau	Taraz
17:00 (UTC+6)		Summary	Muldarov (yellow card) 70'	Stadium: Central Stadium; Attendance: 3,500; Referee: Bolat Karlibayev

1 May 2016 8	Shakhter Karagandy	0 – 0	Atyrau	Karaganda
17:00 (UTC+6)		Summary	V.Kuzmin (yellow card) 74'	Stadium: Shakhter Stadium; Attendance: 1,500; Referee: Aydin Rakhimbayev

5 May 2016 9	Atyrau	2 – 2	Ordabasy	Atyrau
19:00 (UTC+6)	Korobkin (yellow card) 26'; Trytko 45+1', 86'; Konysbayev (yellow card) 57'	Summary	Kasalica 5'; B.Kozhabayev (yellow card) 32'; Narzikulov 51' (o.g.)	Stadium: Munaishy Stadium; Attendance: 2,500; Referee: Anatolyi Vishnichenko

9 May 2016 10	Aktobe	1 – 0	Atyrau	Aktobe
15:00 (UTC+6)	D.Zhalmukan 74' (pen.); Mikhalyov (yellow card) 75'; A.Totay (yellow card) 90+1'	Summary	Korobkin (yellow card) 73'	Stadium: Central Stadium; Attendance: 5,500; Referee: Denis Tevyashov

15 May 2016 11	Atyrau	1 – 0	Astana	Atyrau
18:00 (UTC+6)	A.Saparov 22' (yellow card) 77'; Arzhanov (yellow card) 34'; V.Kuzmin (yellow card) 85'; Curtean (yellow card) 90+1'	Summary	Muzhikov (yellow card) 14'	Stadium: Munaishy Stadium; Attendance: 3,000; Referee: Denis Izmailov

21 May 2016 11	Tobol	1 – 2	Atyrau	Kostanay
17:00 (UTC+6)	Zhumaskaliyev 69'; Mukhutdinov (yellow card) 90'	Summary	Damčevski 9'; Trytko (yellow card) 61'; R.Esatov (yellow card) 68'; Makas 83'	Stadium: Central Stadium; Attendance: 2,500; Referee: Bagdat Abdullaev

29 May 2016 13	Atyrau	0 – 1	Irtysh Pavlodar	Atyrau
19:00 (UTC+6)	Korobkin (yellow card) 15'	Summary	Fonseca (yellow card) 40'; R.Murtazayev (yellow card) 44' (goal) 50'; Aliev (yellow card) 45'; Fall (yellow card) 71'; Loria (yellow card) 90+1'	Stadium: Munaishy Stadium; Attendance: 3,000; Referee: Igor Chesnokov

2 June 2016 14	Kairat	4 – 2	Atyrau	Almaty
20:00 (UTC+6)	Rudoselskiy (yellow card) 19'; Islamkhan 22', 65'; Isael 28'; Arshavin 45+1'; Gohou 85'	Summary	Trytko (yellow card) 15'; Arzhanov 17'; R.Esatov (yellow card) 24'; Curtean 87'; A.Saparov (yellow card) 90+2'	Stadium: Central Stadium; Attendance: 8,500; Referee: Ruslan Duzmambetov

11 June 2016 15	Atyrau	2 – 1	Okzhetpes	Atyrau
20:00 (UTC+6)	Shabalin 28'; Trytko 53'; Korobkin (yellow card) 62'; Muldarov (yellow card) 90+1'	Summary	Chichulin (yellow card) 44'; Khairullin (yellow card) 45+2'; S.N'Ganbe 47'	Stadium: Munaishy Stadium; Attendance: 3,500; Referee: Igor Aleshin

15 June 2016 16	Akzhayik	0 – 4	Atyrau	Oral
19:30 (UTC+6)	R.Rozybakiev (yellow card) 68'; S.Shevtsov (yellow card) 80'	Summary	Korobkin 17' (yellow card) 53'; Arzhanov 33'; Essame (yellow card) 55'; Sharpar 63'; Curtean 73'	Stadium: Petr Atoyan Stadium; Attendance: 2,500; Referee: Askhat Abdanbayev

19 June 2016 17	Atyrau	1 – 0	Taraz	Atyrau
20:00 (UTC+6)	Damčevski 57'; Arzhanov (yellow card) 76'	Summary	K.Karaman (yellow card) 29'	Stadium: Munaishy Stadium; Attendance: 5,000; Referee: Marat Iskakov

25 June 2016 18	Atyrau	0 – 0	Shakhter Karagandy	Atyrau
20:00 (UTC+6)	Sharpar (yellow card) 81'	Summary	I.Pikalkin (yellow card) 43'; Sadownichy (yellow card) 51'; M.Gabyshev (yellow card) 82'	Stadium: Munaishy Stadium; Attendance: 4,500; Referee: Furkat Atajanow

29 June 2016 2	Atyrau	0 – 0	Tobol	Atyrau
20:00 (UTC+6)	Muldarov (yellow card) 41'; Arzhanov (yellow card) 90+1'	Summary	D.Miroshnichenko (yellow card) 75'; Asildarov (yellow card) 90+3'	Stadium: Munaishy Stadium; Attendance: 4,500; Referee: Askhat Abdanbayev

3 July 2016 19	Ordabasy	2 – 1	Atyrau	Shymkent
18:30 (UTC+6)	Gogua (yellow card) 64' (goal) 85' (pen.); E.Tungyshbaev 87'	Summary	Korobkin 30'; Shabalin (red card) 32'; V.Kuzmin (yellow card) 64'; Sharpar (yellow card) 66'; R.Esatov (yellow card) 70'	Stadium: Kazhymukan Munaitpasov Stadium; Attendance: 3,500; Referee: Aydin Rakhimbayev

10 July 2016 20	Atyrau	1 – 1	Aktobe	Atyrau
20:00 (UTC+6)	A.Saparov (yellow card) 47'; Arzhanov 53'; V.Chureyev (yellow card) 63'	Summary	B.Kairov (yellow card) 50'; Sorokin (yellow card) 56'; Bocharov 86'	Stadium: Munaishy Stadium; Attendance: 2,500; Referee: Ruslan Duzmambetov

16 July 2016 21	Astana	2 – 1	Atyrau	Astana
17:00 (UTC+6)	Nurgaliev 20', 39'; Muzhikov (yellow card) 71'; Cañas (yellow card) 90'	Summary	Arzhanov 7'; A.Saparov (yellow card) 86'	Stadium: Astana Arena; Attendance: 3,000; Referee: Askhat Abdanbayev

24 July 2016 22	Atyrau	1 – 0	Zhetysu	Atyrau
20:00 (UTC+6)	Trytko 79'	Summary	Kasyanov (yellow card) 45'; S.Sagyndykov (yellow card) 90'	Stadium: Munaishy Stadium; Attendance: 4,000; Referee: Igor Aleshin

===== League table =====
Pos	Team	Pld	W	D	L	GF	GA	GD	Pts	Qualification
5	Ordabasy	22	9	6	7	26	27	−1	33	Qualification for the championship round
6	Aktobe	22	7	7	8	23	32	−9	28 (Note: Head-to-head record: Aktobe (7 points), Atyrau (5 points), Tobol (4 points).)	Qualification for the championship round
7	Atyrau	22	7	7	8	21	23	−2	28	Qualification for the relegation round
8	Tobol	22	8	4	10	28	26	+2	28	Qualification for the relegation round
9	Zhetysu	22	6	5	11	22	32	−10	23	Qualification for the relegation round

Source: UEFA.com, Soccerway
Rules for classification: 1) Points; 2) Head-to-head points; 3) Head-to-head matches won; 4) Head-to-head goal difference; 5) Head-to-head goals scored; 6) Head-to-head away goals scored; 7) Goal difference; 8) Matches won; 9) Goals scored; 10) Away goals scored; 11) Draw.

==== Relegation round ====
===== Results summary =====
Overall								Home						Away					
Pld	W	D	L	GF	GA	GD	Pts	W	D	L	GF	GA	GD	W	D	L	GF	GA	GD
10	3	2	5	14	16	−2	11	3	1	1	10	5	+5	0	1	4	4	11	−7

Last updated: 31 October 2016.
Source: See Results

===== Results by round =====
Round	1	2	3	4	5	6	7	8	9	10
Ground	A	A	H	A	H	H	A	H	A	H
Result	D	L	D	L	L	W	L	W	L	W
Position	8	8	8	8	9	9	9	8	9	8

Source: See results
A = Away; H = Home; W = Win; D = Draw; L = Loss

===== Results =====
14 August 2016 1	Tobol	0 – 0	Atyrau	Kostanay
19:00 (UTC+6)	Dosmagambetov (yellow card) 56'; Kassaï (yellow card) 61'; Dmitrenko (red card) 85'	Summary	Sharpar (red card) 85'; Essame (yellow card) 90+3'	Stadium: Central Stadium; Attendance: 3,000; Referee: Ruslan Duzmambetov

21 August 2016 2	Taraz	1 – 0	Atyrau	Taraz
19:00 (UTC+6)	Mera (yellow card) 27'; Mané 70'; A.Taubay (yellow card) 83'	Summary	Muldarov (yellow card) 75'	Stadium: Central Stadium; Attendance: 2,800; Referee: Bolat Karlibayev

26 August 2016 3	Atyrau	3 – 3	Zhetysu	Atyrau
19:30 (UTC+6)	Arzhanov 12', 72'; Trytko 52'; Korobkin (yellow card) 82'	Summary	T.Adilkhanov (yellow card) 59'; Djermanović 64'; I.Kalinin (yellow card) 69'; Đalović 86' (yellow card) 90+1'; Beglaryan 89'	Stadium: Munaishy Stadium; Attendance: 1,800; Referee: Timur Kumashev

10 September 2016 4	Shakhter Karagandy	3 – 0	Atyrau	Karaganda
19:00 (UTC+6)	Zošák 15'; Skorykh 38'; A.Tattybaev 59'; Szöke (yellow card) 68'; I.Pikalkin (yellow card) 77'; I.Shatsky (yellow card) 89'	Summary	Essame (yellow card) 27'; R.Esatov (yellow card) 41'	Stadium: Shakhter Stadium; Attendance: 3,000; Referee: Denis Izmailov

17 September 2016 5	Atyrau	1 – 2	Akzhayik	Atyrau
17:00 (UTC+6)	Curtean 33'; Makas (yellow card) 90'	Summary	Dudchenko 61', 78'	Stadium: Munaishy Stadium; Attendance: 2,000; Referee: Aydin Rakhimbayev

25 September 2016 6	Atyrau	1 – 0	Taraz	Atyrau
16:00 (UTC+6)	Curtean 63'; V.Chureyev (yellow card) 73'	Summary	Ergashev (yellow card) 24'; Vorotnikov (yellow card) 41'; D.Yevstigneyev (yellow card) 77'	Stadium: Munaishy Stadium; Attendance: 2,000; Referee: Furkhat Atazhanov

1 October 2016 7	Zhetysu	4 – 3	Atyrau	Taldykorgan
16:30 (UTC+6)	Kasyanov 27'; I.Amirseitov (yellow card) 41'; Djermanović 54', 59'; Zhangylyshbay 85'	Summary	Fedin 12'; Trytko 24'; Arzhanov 29'; Lamanje (yellow card) 84'	Stadium: Zhetysu Stadium; Attendance: 1,200; Referee: Daniyar Sakhi

16 October 2016 8	Atyrau	2 – 0	Shakhter Karagandy	Atyrau
16:00 (UTC+6)	Arzhanov 17'; Muldarov (yellow card) 34'; Fedin (yellow card) 54'; A.Saparov (yellow card) 66'; Shabalin 78'	Summary	Ubbink (yellow card) 43'; Sadownichy (yellow card) 75'; Simonovski (yellow card) 83'	Stadium: Munaishy Stadium; Attendance: 2,000; Referee: Igor Aleshin

22 October 2016 9	Akzhayik	3 – 1	Atyrau	Oral
15:00 (UTC+6)	Dudchenko 16'; R.Rozybakiev (yellow card) 31'; Coronel 37', 70'; Odibe (yellow card) 80'; Shakhmetov (yellow card) 90+2'	Summary	Muldarov (yellow card) 28'; R.Esatov (yellow card) 43'; A.Saparov (yellow card) 57'; Sharpar 60'	Stadium: Petr Atoyan Stadium; Attendance: 1,500; Referee: Viktor Antonov

29 October 2016 10	Atyrau	3 – 0	Tobol	Atyrau
15:00 (UTC+6)	Sharpar 3' (pen.) (yellow card) 5'; A.Saparov (yellow card) 31'; Curtean (yellow card) 38'; Kassaï 47' (o.g.); Essame 66'; Fedin (yellow card) 89'	Summary	Dmitrenko (yellow card) 3'; Gorman (yellow card) 73'; T.Elmurzayev (yellow card) 90'	Stadium: Munaishy Stadium; Attendance: 1,500; Referee: Marat Iskakov

===== League table =====
Pos	Team	Pld	W	D	L	GF	GA	GD	Pts	Relegation
7	Tobol	32	12	5	15	40	40	0	41	
8	Atyrau	32	10	9	13	35	39	−4	39	
9	Shakhter Karagandy	32	10	6	16	25	40	−15	36	
10	Akzhayik	32	11	2	19	27	50	−23	35 (Note: Head-to-head record; Taraz–Akzhayik 0–1, Akzhayik–Taraz 2–1, Akzhayik–Taraz 2–0, Taraz–Akzhayik 2–1.)	
11	Taraz	32	10	5	17	33	42	−9	35	Qualification for the relegation play-offs (Note: Despite finishing 11th and losing the relegation playoffs, Taraz were readmitted because only one team was given a license.)
12	Zhetysu (R)	32	8	7	17	37	53	−16	31	Relegation to the Kazakhstan First Division

Source: Soccerway
Rules for classification: 1) Points; 2) Head-to-head points; 3) Head-to-head matches won; 4) Head-to-head goal difference; 5) Head-to-head goals scored; 6) Head-to-head away goals scored; 7) Goal difference; 8) Matches won; 9) Goals scored; 10) Away goals scored; 11) Draw.
(R) Relegated

=== Kazakhstan Cup ===
27 April 2016 Last 16	Atyrau	1 – 0	Altai Semey	Atyrau
16:00 (UTC+6)	V.Chureyev (yellow card) 23'; A.Saparov (yellow card) 49'; Curtean (yellow card) 79'; Damčevski 90+3'	Summary	R.Mukanov (yellow card) 39'	Stadium: Munaishy Stadium; Attendance: 3,000; Referee: Timur Kumashev

25 May 2016 Quarterfinal	Atyrau	1 – 1 (a.e.t.) (4 – 1 p)	Ordabasy	Atyrau
19:00 (UTC+6)	Arzhanov 71'; A.Baltaev (yellow card) 80'; Essame (yellow card) 112'	Summary	Abdulin (yellow card) 72' (goal) 90+1'; Mukhtarov (yellow card) 112'; Irismetov (yellow card) 120'	Stadium: Munaishy Stadium; Attendance: 5,500; Referee: Artyom Kuchin

21 September 2016 Semifinal 1st leg	Kairat	1 – 0	Atyrau	Almaty
19:30 (UTC+6)	Kuat 72'; Marković (yellow card) 78'	Summary	A.Saparov (yellow card) 44'	Stadium: Central Stadium; Attendance: 7,000; Referee: Bolat Karlibayev

5 November 2016 Semifinal 2nd leg	Atyrau	0 – 3 (0 – 4 agg.)	Kairat	Atyrau
15:00 (UTC+6)	Curtean (yellow card) 23'; Muldarov (yellow card) 40'; Essame (yellow card) 73'; R.Nurmukhametov (yellow card) 90+1'	Summary	G.Suyumbayev 2'; Arshavin 65'; Bakayev (yellow card) 84'; Turysbek (yellow card) 85' (yellow-red card) 88'; Acevedo 90+2'	Stadium: Munaishy Stadium; Attendance: 4,000; Referee: Igor Aleshin

== Squad statistics ==
As of Match played 5 November 2016

=== Appearances and goals ===
No.	Pos	Nat	Player	Total		Premier League		Kazakhstan Cup	
No.	Pos	Nat	Player	Apps	Goals	Apps	Goals	Apps	Goals
2	DF	(Kazakhstan) KAZ	Aldan Baltaev	11	0	6+3	0	2	0
3	DF	(Kazakhstan) KAZ	Aleksei Muldarov	29	0	27+1	0	1	0
5	MF	(Kazakhstan) KAZ	Aleksei Marov	7	0	1+4	0	0+2	0
6	MF	(Kazakhstan) KAZ	Altynbek Saparov	23	1	13+8	1	2	0
7	MF	(Cameroon) CMR	Guy Essame	32	1	27+1	1	4	0
8	DF	(Kazakhstan) KAZ	Valentin Chureyev	19	0	11+5	0	3	0
9	MF	(Ukraine) UKR	Volodymyr Arzhanov	36	9	31+1	8	2+2	1
10	MF	(Kazakhstan) KAZ	Pavel Shabalin	29	3	17+8	3	2+2	0
11	MF	(Ukraine) UKR	Vyacheslav Sharpar	24	3	13+7	3	4	0
12	DF	(Kazakhstan) KAZ	Ruslan Esatov	22	0	15+3	0	3+1	0
13	FW	(Belarus) BLR	Alyaksandr Makas	27	1	8+16	1	2+1	0
14	FW	(Kazakhstan) KAZ	Nauryzbek Zhagora	2	0	0+2	0	0	0
17	MF	(Kazakhstan) KAZ	Ulan Konysbayev	13	0	12+1	0	0	0
19	MF	(Kazakhstan) KAZ	Valeri Korobkin	27	2	23+2	2	1+1	0
21	DF	(North Macedonia) MKD	Aleksandar Damčevski	24	3	20+1	2	3	1
26	FW	(Poland) POL	Przemysław Trytko	31	7	20+8	7	2+1	0
28	DF	(Kazakhstan) KAZ	Vladislav Kuzmin	21	0	16+4	0	1	0
30	MF	(Romania) ROU	Alexandru Curtean	33	4	26+3	4	3+1	0
33	DF	(France) FRA	Abdel Lamanje	35	0	31+1	0	3	0
34	GK	(Kazakhstan) KAZ	Zhasur Narzikulov	35	0	32	0	3	0
35	GK	(Kazakhstan) KAZ	Ramil Nurmukhametov	2	0	0+1	0	1	0
96	MF	(Kazakhstan) KAZ	Maxim Fedin	15	1	4+9	1	2	0
Players away from Atyrau on loan:
Players who appeared for Atyrau that left during the season:

=== Goal scorers ===
Place	Position	Nation	Number	Name	Premier League	Kazakhstan Cup	Total
1	MF	(Ukraine)	9	Volodymyr Arzhanov	8	1	9
2	FW	(Poland)	26	Przemysław Trytko	7	0	7
3	MF	(Romania)	30	Alexandru Curtean	4	0	4
4	MF	(Kazakhstan)	10	Pavel Shabalin	3	0	3
4	MF	(Ukraine)	11	Vyacheslav Sharpar	3	0	3
6	DF	(North Macedonia)	21	Aleksandar Damčevski	2	0	2
6	MF	(Kazakhstan)	19	Valeri Korobkin	2	0	2
8	MF	(Kazakhstan)	17	Ulan Konysbayev	1	0	1
8	MF	(Kazakhstan)	6	Altynbek Saparov	1	0	1
8	FW	(Belarus)	13	Alyaksandr Makas	1	0	1
8	MF	(Kazakhstan)	96	Maxim Fedin	1	0	1
8	MF	(Cameroon)	7	Guy Essame	1	0	1
8	DF	(North Macedonia)	21	Aleksandar Damčevski	0	1	1
8				Own goal	1	0	1
				TOTALS	35	2	37

=== Disciplinary record ===
Number	Nation	Position	Name	Premier League		Kazakhstan Cup		Total	
Number	Nation	Position	Name	Yellow card	Red card	Yellow card	Red card	Yellow card	Red card
2	(Kazakhstan)	DF	Aldan Baltaev	0	0	1	0	1	0
5	(Kazakhstan)	DF	Aleksei Muldarov	7	0	1	0	8	0
6	(Kazakhstan)	MF	Altynbek Saparov	8	0	1	0	9	0
7	(Cameroon)	MF	Guy Essame	4	0	2	0	6	0
8	(Kazakhstan)	DF	Valentin Chureyev	3	0	0	0	3	0
9	(Ukraine)	MF	Volodymyr Arzhanov	3	0	0	0	3	0
10	(Kazakhstan)	MF	Pavel Shabalin	1	1	0	0	1	1
11	(Kazakhstan)	MF	Vyacheslav Sharpar	3	1	0	0	3	1
12	(Kazakhstan)	DF	Ruslan Esatov	6	0	0	0	6	0
13	(Belarus)	FW	Alyaksandr Makas	2	0	0	0	2	0
17	(Kazakhstan)	MF	Ulan Konysbayev	1	0	0	0	1	0
19	(Kazakhstan)	MF	Valeri Korobkin	7	0	0	0	7	0
26	(Poland)	FW	Przemysław Trytko	3	0	0	0	3	0
28	(Kazakhstan)	DF	Vladislav Kuzmin	6	1	0	0	6	1
30	(Romania)	MF	Alexandru Curtean	4	0	1	0	5	0
33	(France)	DF	Abdel Lamanje	1	0	0	0	1	0
35	(Kazakhstan)	GK	Ramil Nurmukhametov	0	0	1	0	1	0
96	(Kazakhstan)	MF	Maxim Fedin	2	0	0	0	2	0
			TOTALS	58	3	10	0	68	3
