= Franck Dja Djédjé =

Ivorian footballer (born 1986)

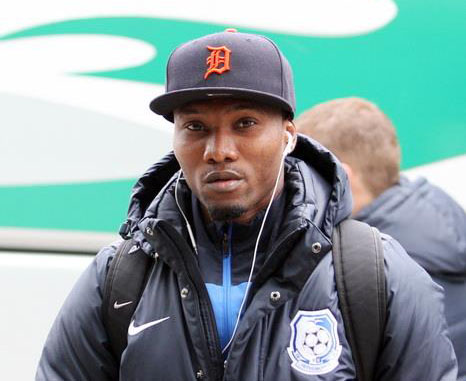
- Dja Djédjé in November 2013

Personal information
- Full name: Franck Dja Djédjé
- Date of birth: 2 June 1986 (age 40)
- Place of birth: Abidjan, Ivory Coast
- Height: 1.76 m (5 ft 9 in)
- Position: Striker

Youth career
- 1998–1999: Solitaire Paris
- 1999–2003: Paris Saint-Germain

Senior career*
Years	Team	Apps	(Gls)
2003–2007	Paris Saint-Germain	5	(0)
2004–2005	→ Stade Brestois (loan)	23	(1)
2006–2007	→ Grenoble (loan)	33	(5)
2007–2009	Grenoble	36	(10)
2009	Strasbourg	9	(0)
2009–2010	→ Vannes (loan)	30	(2)
2010–2011	Arles-Avignon	37	(5)
2011–2012	Nice	21	(4)
2012–2014	Chornomorets Odesa	38	(15)
2014	Sarpsborg 08	14	(8)
2014	Dinamo Minsk	6	(3)
2015	Hibernian	11	(2)
2015–2016	Al-Shahania		
2017	Irtysh Pavlodar	15	(2)
2017–2018	Kaisar	28	(3)
2019–2020	Cannes	17	(4)
2021–2022	Stade Laurentin		
2022	US Cap d'Ail		

International career^{‡}
	France U17	13	(11)
	France U18	6	(4)
	France U19	17	(9)
2006–2008	France U21	1	(1)
2008	Ivory Coast U23	2	(0)
Medal record
Men's Football
Representing France
UEFA European Under-19 Championship
Winner	2005	Team
- * Club domestic league appearances and goals as of 31 July 2021 ‡ National team caps and goals as of 2 June 2010

Franck Dja Djédjé (born 2 June 1986) is an Ivorian former professional footballer who played as a striker.

== Club career ==
Dja Djédjé came to France from his country of birth at the 12 years age, where he signed with SC Solitaire de Paris at youth level, before moving on to the youth setup at French giants Paris Saint-Germain at the age of 13. He rose to the ranks of the senior team, before moving to Stade Brestois 29 on loan for the 2004–05 season. For the 2006–07 season joined Ligue 2 club Grenoble Foot 38 on loan. On 30 January 2009, he moved to another rival team RC Strasbourg and on 31 August 2009 Vannes OC have signed the forward on loan.

He signed for French Ligue 1 club AC Arles-Avignon in July 2010.

On 26 August 2011, it was announced that Dja Djédjé would move to Ligue 1 outfit OGC Nice, signing a three-year deal.

At the start of March 2014, Dja Djédjé left Chornomorets Odesa due to the civil unrest caused by the 2014 Ukrainian revolution, and went on to sign a three-month contract with Norwegian side Sarpsborg 08 at the end of the month.

Following the expiration of his Sarpsborg 08 contract, he signed for Dinamo Minsk on 2 September 2014, on a contract till the end of the season, with the option of an extension.

On 5 January 2015, Dja Djédjé signed for Hibernian. He cut short his contract by a year to move to Qatari club Al-Shahania in June 2015. He left Al-Shahania in July 2016.

In January 2017, he went on trial with Kazakhstan Premier League side Irtysh Pavlodar.

On 7 July 2017, Dja Djédjé signed with FC Kaisar until the end of the season.

== International career ==
Dja Djédjé has played internationally for France in their Under-17, Under-18 and Under-19 team, gaining a large number of caps. In 2005, he won the European U-19 Championship with France in Belfast.

In 2008, he was selected to represent Ivory Coast at the 2008 Summer Olympics, just right before his nationality transfer deadline—his 21st birthday.

== Personal life ==
He has dual French and Ivorian nationality.

== Career statistics ==
=== Club ===
As of 21 January 2017.

Club statistics
Club	Season	League			Cup (Note: Includes the Kazakhstan Cup.)		League Cup		Continental (Note: Includes the UEFA Europa League.)		Other		Total	
Club	Season	Division	Apps	Goals	Apps	Goals	Apps	Goals	Apps	Goals	Apps	Goals	Apps	Goals
Sarpsborg 08	2014	Eliteserien	14	2	4	4	—		—		—		18	6
Dinamo Minsk	2014	Vysheyshaya Liga	6	3	0	0	—		6	0	—		12	3
Hibernian	2014–15	Scottish Championship	11	2	3	1	0	0	—		1	0	15	3
Career total			31	7	7	5	0	0	0	6	0	1	45	12
