= Kirill Shestakov =

Russian footballer

Personal information
- Full name: Kirill Sergeyevich Shestakov
- Date of birth: 19 June 1985 (age 41)
- Place of birth: Stavropol, Soviet Union
- Height: 1.80 m (5 ft 11 in)
- Position: Midfielder

Team information
- Current team: Khimki-M (assistant coach)

Senior career*
Years	Team	Apps	(Gls)
2003–2004	Nosta Novotroitsk	36	(3)
2004	Zhemchuzhina Budyonnovsk	10	(1)
2005	Pskov-2000	10	(2)
2005–2007	Alma-Ata	48	(1)
2007	Sodovik Sterlitamak	10	(1)
2008	Zelenograd	33	(1)
2009	Stavropol	27	(2)
2010	Vostok		
2011–2013	Kairat	72	(0)
2014–2015	Kaisar	41	(1)
2016–2017	Aktobe	52	(3)
2018	Irtysh Pavlodar	19	(0)
2020–2021	Caspiy	1	(0)

International career
	Kazakhstan U21	1	(0)

Managerial career
- 2025–: Khimki-M (assistant)
- * Club domestic league appearances and goals

Kirill Sergeyevich Shestakov (Russian: Кирилл Серге́евич Шестаков; born 19 June 1985) is a Russian professional football coach and a former player. He is an assistant coach with Khimki-M.

His father Sergei Shestakov was also a professional footballer.

== Career statistics ==
=== Club ===
As of match played 20 November 2018

Appearances and goals by club, season and competition
Club	Season	League			National Cup		Continental		Other		Total	
Club	Season	Division	Apps	Goals	Apps	Goals	Apps	Goals	Apps	Goals	Apps	Goals
Kairat	2011	Kazakhstan Premier League	28	0	2	0	-		-		30	0
Kairat	2012	Kazakhstan Premier League	22	0	2	0	-		-		24	0
Kairat	2013	Kazakhstan Premier League	22	0	2	0	-		-		24	0
Kairat	Total		72	0	6	0	-	-	-	-	78	0
Kaisar	2014	Kazakhstan Premier League	20	0	1	0	-		-		21	0
Kaisar	2015	Kazakhstan Premier League	21	1	2	0	-		-		23	1
Kaisar	Total		41	1	3	0	-	-	-	-	44	1
Aktobe	2016	Kazakhstan Premier League	27	1	0	0	1	0	-		28	1
Aktobe	2017	Kazakhstan Premier League	25	2	1	0	-		-		26	1
Aktobe	Total		52	3	1	0	1	0	-	-	54	3
Irtysh Pavlodar	2018	Kazakhstan Premier League	18	0	2	0	2	0	2	1	24	1
Career total			183	4	12	0	3	0	2	1	200	5
