= Sergei Shestakov =

Russian footballer and coach

Personal information
- Full name: Sergei Nikolayevich Shestakov
- Date of birth: 30 January 1961 (age 65)
- Place of birth: Stavropol, Russian SFSR
- Height: 1.80 m (5 ft 11 in)
- Positions: Defender; midfielder

Senior career*
Years	Team	Apps	(Gls)
1979	Salyut Belgorod	1	(0)
1979–1986	Dynamo Stavropol	197	(0)
1987–1988	Daugava Rīga	69	(2)
1989–1991	Dynamo Stavropol	116	(4)
1991–1993	Legia Warsaw	37	(2)
1993	Dynamo Stavropol	15	(2)
1993	Lada Togliatti	16	(1)
1994–1995	Dynamo Stavropol	30	(1)

Managerial career
- 1996–1997: Dynamo Stavropol (assistant)
- 1998–1999: Beshtau Lermontov
- 2000–2001: KAMAZ Naberezhnye Chelny (assistant)
- 2003–2004: Nosta Novotroitsk
- 2004: Zhemchuzhina Budyonnovsk
- 2005: Titan Moscow
- 2016: Baltika Kaliningrad (assistant)
- * Club domestic league appearances and goals

Sergei Nikolayevich Shestakov (Russian: Серге́й Николаевич Шестаков; born 30 January 1961) is a Russian professional football coach and former player.

He was the first foreigner to score a goal for Polish club Legia Warsaw.

His son Kirill Shestakov is a professional footballer.
