= Aleksey Muldarov =

Kazakhstani Professional Footballer

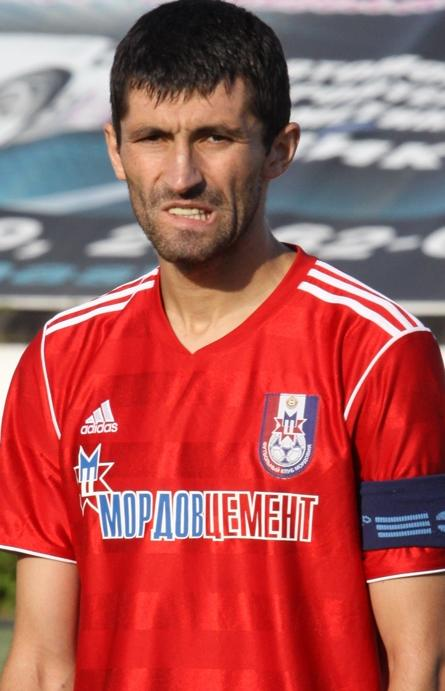
- Muldarov with FC Mordovia Saransk (2011)

Personal information
- Full name: Aleksey Alekseyevich Muldarov
- Date of birth: 24 April 1984 (age 42)
- Place of birth: Tskhinvali, South Ossetian Autonomous Oblast, Georgian SSR, Soviet Union
- Height: 1.89 m (6 ft 2 in)
- Position: Centre back

Youth career
- 1999–2001: Spartaki-Tskhinvali Tbilisi

Senior career*
| Years | Team | Apps | (Gls) |
| 2001–2002 | Mozdok | 49 | (1) |
| 2005 | FC Mozdok (D4) | | |
| 2005–2007 | Krasnodar-2000 | 66 | (2) |
| 2008 | Gubkin | 34 | (1) |
| 2009–2012 | Mordovia Saransk | 128 | (12) |
| 2013–2014 | Aktobe | 52 | (0) |
| 2015 | Kaisar | 9 | (2) |
| 2015 | Shakhter Karagandy | 8 | (1) |
| 2016 | Atyrau | 28 | (0) |
| 2017 | Kaisar | 13 | (1) |
| 2018 | Kyzylzhar | 6 | (0) |
| 2018 | Kubanskaya Korona Shevchenko | | |

International career
| 2013 | Kazakhstan | 3 | (0) |
| 2019 | South Ossetia | | |

Managerial career
- 2021–2023: Dynamo Stavropol
- 2023–2024: Biolog-Novokubansk (assistant)
- 2025–2026: Zarya Lugansk
- * Club domestic league appearances and goals

Aleksey Alekseyevich Muldarov (Russian: Алексей Алексеевич Мулдаров, Georgian: ალექსეი ალექსეიევიჭ მულდაროვ; born 24 April 1984) is a former professional footballer who played as a defender. Born in South Ossetia, Muldarov represented Kazakhstan internationally and played for a number of clubs in Russia and Kazakhstan.

== Early life ==
Aleksey Alekseyevich Muldarov was born on 24 April 1984 in Tskhinvali, South Ossetian Autonomous Oblast, Georgian Soviet Socialist Republic, Soviet Union.

== Club career ==
Muldarov began his professional career with Russian side Mozdok in 2001. He moved to Krasnodar-2000 in 2005 and spent three seasons with the Russian Second League side. Muldarov then spent one season with Gubkin before joining Mordovia Saransk in 2009. In his first season with the club, he was named as the best defender of the Ural-Povolzhye zone in the Second League. While playing for Mordovia Saransk, the club won the 2011–12 Football Championship of the National League.

In February 2013, Muldarov left Mordovia Saransk by mutual agreement and subsequently joined Aktobe. While playing for Aktobe, the club won the 2013 Kazakhstan Premier League and the 2014 Kazakhstan Super Cup.

In December 2014, Muldarov left Aktobe. The following year, he played for both Kaisar and Shakhter Karagandy before signing for Atyrau in January 2016. After a season with Atyrau, he returned to Kaisar in January 2017. He subsequntly played for Kyzylzhar, Kubanskaya Korona Shevchenko and Stavropol Agrosoyuz Ivanovo.

== International career ==
Muldarov earned three caps for Kazakhstan in 2013.

In 2019, he represented South Ossetia at the 2019 CONIFA European Football Cup.

== Career statistics ==
=== Club ===
| Club | Season | League | | | National Cup | | Continental | | Other | | Total | |
| Club | Season | Division | Apps | Goals | Apps | Goals | Apps | Goals | Apps | Goals | Apps | Goals |
|---|---|---|---|---|---|---|---|---|---|---|---|---|
| Aktobe | 2013 | Kazakhstan Premier League | 29 | 0 | | | 8 | 0 | – | | 37 | 0 |
| Aktobe | 2014 | Kazakhstan Premier League | 23 | 0 | 2 | 0 | 4 | 0 | 1 | 0 | 30 | 0 |
| Aktobe | Total | | 52 | 0 | 2 | 0 | 12 | 0 | 1 | 0 | 67 | 0 |
| Kaisar | 2015 | Kazakhstan Premier League | 9 | 2 | 1 | 0 | – | | – | | 10 | 2 |
| Shakhter Karagandy | 2015 | Kazakhstan Premier League | 8 | 1 | 0 | 0 | – | | – | | 8 | 1 |
| Atyrau | 2016 | Kazakhstan Premier League | 28 | 0 | 0 | 0 | – | | – | | 28 | 0 |
| Kaisar | 2017 | Kazakhstan Premier League | 13 | 1 | 1 | 0 | – | | – | | 14 | 1 |
| Career total | | | 110 | 4 | 4 | 0 | 12 | 0 | 1 | 0 | 127 | 4 |

=== International ===
Kazakhstan national team
| Year | Apps | Goals |
|---|---|---|
| 2013 | 3 | 0 |
| Total | 3 | 0 |

== Honours ==
=== Mordovia Saransk ===
- 2011–12 Football Championship of the National League

=== Aktobe ===
- 2013 Kazakhstan Premier League
- 2014 Kazakhstan Super Cup
