= Miljan Jablan =

Serbian footballer

Personal information
- Date of birth: 30 January 1985 (age 41)
- Place of birth: Vrbas, SFR Yugoslavia
- Height: 1.92 m (6 ft 3 1/2 in)
- Position: Centre-back

Senior career*
Years	Team	Apps	(Gls)
2002–2005	Srbobran	69	(4)
2006-2007	Sileks	37	(7)
2007–2008	Spartak Subotica	13	(1)
2008	→ ČSK Čelarevo (loan)	8	(0)
2008–2010	ČSK Čelarevo	40	(5)
2009	→ Novi Sad (loan)	4	(0)
2010–2011	Proleter Novi Sad	15	(0)
2012–2013	Neman Grodno	39	(3)
2014	Kaisar	18	(0)
2015	Akzhayik	10	(0)
2015–2016	Borac Čačak	20	(0)
2016	Sūduva	21	(1)
2017	Mladost Podgorica	10	(1)
2017	Alashkert	6	(0)
2018–2020	Proleter Novi Sad	15	(0)
2020	Kabel	3	(0)
2020–2021	Mladost Novi Sad		
2021	Tekstilac Odžaci		
2021	Drava Ptuj	1	(0)
2022	ČSK Čelarevo		
2023	Borac Bobota		
- * Club domestic league appearances and goals as of 4 September 2021

Miljan Jablan (Serbian Cyrillic: Миљан Јаблан; born 30 January 1985) is a Serbian former footballer.

== Career ==
In February 2014, Jablan signed for Kazakhstan Premier League side FC Kaisar.

== Honours ==
Alashkert

- Armenian Premier League: 2017–18
- Armenian Cup Runner-up: 2017–18
- Armenian Supercup Runner-up: 2017–18

Sūduva

- Lithuanian Football Cup Runner-up: 2016
