= Yevhen Shyryayev =

Ukrainian footballer (born 1984)

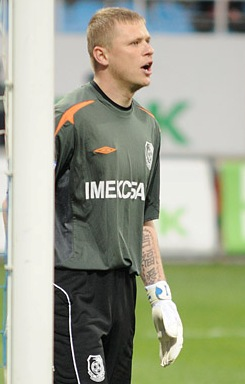

Personal information
- Full name: Yevhen Yuriyovych Shyryayev
- Date of birth: 22 February 1984 (age 42)
- Place of birth: Uspenivka, Odesa Oblast, Ukrainian SSR
- Height: 1.86 m (6 ft 1 in)
- Position: Goalkeeper

Team information
- Current team: Chornomorets Odesa U19 (GK coach)

Youth career
- 1998–1999: UFK Dnipropetrovsk
- 1999–2000: UFK-2 Dnipropetrovsk

Senior career*
Years	Team	Apps	(Gls)
2000–2011	Chornomorets Odesa	38	(0)
2001–2004	→ Chornomorets-2 Odesa	55	(0)
2011–2012	Desna Chernihiv	18	(0)
2012–2014	Zirka Kirovohrad	37	(0)
2014	Kaisar	0	(0)
2015–2016	Real Pharma Odesa	25	(0)
2016–2017	Zhemchuzhyna Odesa	40	(0)
Total		213	(0)

International career
2003–2006	Ukraine21	15	(0)

Managerial career
- 2018–: Chornomorets Odesa U19 (GK coach)
Medal record
Men's football
Representing Ukraine
UEFA European Under-21 Championship
Runner-up	2006 Portugal
- * Club domestic league appearances and goals

Yevhen Yuriyovych Shyryayev (Ukrainian: Євген Юрійович Ширяєв, romanized: Yevhen Yuriiovych Shyriaiev; born 22 February 1984) is a Ukrainian former professional footballer who played as a football goalkeeper. He was born in Uspenivka, Bilhorod-Dnistrovskyi Raion, in the Odesa Oblast of the Ukrainian SSR of the Soviet Union (now in Ukraine). He joined FC Chornomorets Odesa in the winter of 2000–01.
