= Sergei Strukov =

Russian footballer

Personal information
- Full name: Sergei Stanislavovich Strukov
- Date of birth: 17 September 1982 (age 44)
- Place of birth: Volgograd, Soviet Union
- Height: 1.92 m (6 ft 4 in)
- Position: Forward

Senior career*
Years	Team	Apps	(Gls)
2004–2005	Rotor-2 Volgograd	22	(6)
2004	Rotor Volgograd	2	(0)
2005–2006	Metallurg Lipetsk	47	(8)
2007	Irtysh	29	(8)
2008–2010	Aktobe	66	(21)
2010	Avangard Kursk	9	(2)
2011	Kairat	16	(5)
2012	Irtysh	15	(4)
2012	Tobol	9	(3)
2013	Irtysh	7	(4)
2014–2015	Kaisar	48	(6)
2016–2017	Kyzylzhar		
2017	Okzhetpes	10	(2)
- * Club domestic league appearances and goals

Sergei Stanislavovich Strukov (Russian: Струков Сергей Станиславович; born 17 September 1982) is a former Russian football forward.

== Honours ==
=== Club ===
Aktobe

- Kazakhstan Premier League (2): 2008, 2009
- Kazakhstan Cup (1): 2008
- Kazakhstan Super Cup (2): 2008, 2010
