= Zhasulan Moldakarayev =

Kazakhstani footballer

Personal information
- Full name: Zhasulan Ubaydauly Moldakarayev
- Date of birth: 7 May 1987 (age 39)
- Place of birth: Kyzylorda, Kazakhstan
- Height: 1.80 m (5 ft 11 in)
- Position: Striker

Team information
- Current team: Taraz
- Number: 17

Senior career*
Years	Team	Apps	(Gls)
2007–2015	Kaisar	202	(58)
2016	Okzhetpes	31	(6)
2017–2018	Tobol	41	(5)
2018	Ordabasy	14	(4)
2019–2023	Okzhetpes	100	(38)
2024–2025	Ulytau	46	(22)
2026–	Taraz	12	(5)

International career
2016	Kazakhstan	2	(0)
- * Club domestic league appearances and goals as of 2 November 2026

Zhasulan Ubaydauly Moldakarayev (Kazakh: Жасұлан Ұбайдаұлы Молдақараев; born 7 May 1987) is a Kazakh professional footballer who plays for Taraz.

== Career ==
=== Club ===
In December 2015, Moldakarayev signed for FC Okzhetpes. After a move to Altai Semey fell through in December 2016, Moldakarayev signed for FC Tobol in February 2017.

=== International ===
Moldakarayev made his debut for Kazakhstan on 30 August 2016, in a friendly against Kyrgyzstan.

== Career statistics ==
=== Club ===
As of match played 11 November 2018

Appearances and goals by club, season and competition
Club	Season	League			National Cup		Continental		Other		Total	
Club	Season	Division	Apps	Goals	Apps	Goals	Apps	Goals	Apps	Goals	Apps	Goals
Kaisar	2007	Kazakhstan Premier League	17	0			–		–		17	0
Kaisar	2008	Kazakhstan Premier League	22	2			–		–		22	2
Kaisar	2009	Kazakhstan Premier League	20	1			–		–		20	1
Kaisar	2010	Kazakhstan First Division	27	14			–		–		27	14
Kaisar	2011	Kazakhstan Premier League	22	2	1	0	–		–		23	2
Kaisar	2012	Kazakhstan Premier League	18	3	3	1	–		–		21	4
Kaisar	2013	Kazakhstan First Division	33	28	1	0	–		–		34	28
Kaisar	2014	Kazakhstan Premier League	19	2	1	0	–		–		20	2
Kaisar	2015	Kazakhstan Premier League	24	6	1	0	–		–		25	6
Kaisar	Total		202	58	7	1	-	-	-	-	209	59
Okzhetpes	2016	Kazakhstan Premier League	31	6	1	0	–		–		32	6
Tobol	2017	Kazakhstan Premier League	29	5	1	0	–		–		30	5
Tobol	2018	Kazakhstan Premier League	12	0	2	0	1	0	–		15	0
Tobol	Total		41	5	3	0	1	0	-	-	45	5
Ordabasy	2018	Kazakhstan Premier League	14	4	0	0	–		–		14	4
Okzhetpes	2019	Kazakhstan Premier League	27	5	1	0	–		–		28	5
Okzhetpes	2020	Kazakhstan Premier League	3	0	0	0	–		–		3	0
Okzhetpes	Total		30	5	1	0	-	-	-	-	31	5
Career total			318	78	12	1	1	0	-	-	331	79

=== International ===
Kazakhstan national team
Year	Apps	Goals
2016	2	0
Total	2	0

Statistics accurate as of match played 11 November 2016
