= Martin Klein (footballer) =

Czech footballer

Personal information
- Date of birth: 2 July 1984 (age 42)
- Place of birth: Brno, Czechoslovakia
- Height: 1.87 m (6 ft 2 in)
- Position: Centre-back

Youth career
- 1994–1996: RAFK Rajhrad
- 1996: SK Vojkovice
- 1996–2000: Boby Brno

Senior career*
Years	Team	Apps	(Gls)
2000–2004	Sparta Prague	4	(0)
2001–2002	→ Teplice (loan)	1	(0)
2004–2010	Teplice	167	(12)
2010–2011	Konyaspor	4	(0)
2011–2013	Ferencvárosi	39	(5)
2013–2014	Teplice	6	(0)
2014–2016	Kaisar	85	(2)
2016	Zhetysu	30	(1)
2017	Motorlet Prague		
2017	Birkirkara	5	(2)
2018–2019	Viktorie Jirny	14	(3)
2019	Benátky nad Jizerou		
2019	Rakovník	13	(1)
2020	Kickers Selb	1	(0)

International career
2004–2007	Czech Republic U21	22	(0)
2009	Czech Republic	1	(0)
- * Club domestic league appearances and goals

Martin Klein (born 2 July 1984) is a Czech former professional footballer who played as a centre-back.

== Club career ==
Born in Brno, Klein started his career playing for Boby Brno, then he joined Sparta Prague in 2000. On 27 February 2002, he scored a goal in a 2–1 loss against Panathinaikos in the 2001–02 UEFA Champions League, at the age of 17 years and 241 days. Later on, he transferred to Teplice, then he joined Konyaspor and Ferencvárosi, before returning to Teplice in 2013.

In February 2014, Klein signed for Kazakhstan Premier League side FC Kaisar.

In the summer 2019, Klein joined SK Rakovník. On 30 December 2019, Klein moved to German Landesliga Bayern-Nordost club Kickers Selb.

== International career ==
Klein was part of Czech Republic U-21. On 5 June 2009, he made his debut for the Czech Republic national team in a friendly match against Malta, which ended in a 1–0 win.

== Honours ==
Sparta Prague

- Czech First League: 2000–01, 2002–03

Teplice

- Czech Cup: 2008–09

Ferencváros

- Hungarian League Cup: 2012–13
