= Gani Muratbayev Stadium =

Multi-use stadium

Coordinates: 44°49′34″N 65°30′12″E

- Interactive map of Gani Muratbayev Stadium
- Location: Kyzylorda, Kazakhstan
- Owner: Municipality of Taldykorgan
- Capacity: 6,800
- Surface: Grass; 105m x 68m
- Record attendance: 7,000 (FC Kaysar Kyzylorda-FC Ordabasy 2-3, 13 August 2023)

Construction
- Opened: 1968

Tenant
- FC Kaisar

Gani Muratbayev Stadium (Kazakh: Ğani Mūratbaev stadion) is a multi-use stadium in Kyzylorda, Kazakhstan. It is currently used mostly for football matches and is the home stadium of FC Kaisar. It is named after the founder of Kazakhstan Young Communist League Gany Muratbayev.

== History ==
The construction of the football arena began in 1968. The stadium was completed on 29 October 1969 that and released to be used by the city's citizens.

== Reconstruction ==
In 2001, the stadium was completely refurbished creating sports facilities created for local residents. In 2010, the sports complex was renovated again; the seating in the east and west stands were replaced with plastic seats. Currently, the stadium seats 6,800 seats; the total area of the stadium is 16,700 square metres. The stadium has a pitch of 105×68 metres.
