= Matic Maruško =

Slovenian footballer (born 1990)

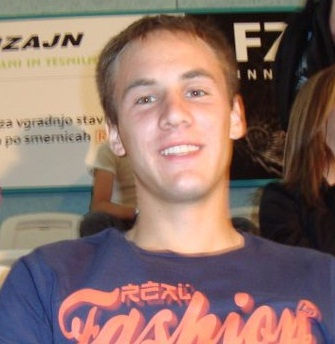

Personal information
- Date of birth: 30 November 1990 (age 35)
- Place of birth: Murska Sobota, SFR Yugoslavia
- Height: 1.81 m (5 ft 11 in)
- Position: Defensive midfielder

Team information
- Current team: SC Pinkafeld

Youth career
- Apače
- –2005: Mura
- 2005–2009: Mura 05

Senior career*
Years	Team	Apps	(Gls)
2009–2013	Mura 05	118	(7)
2009–2010	→ Tromejnik (loan)	4	(1)
2010–2011	→ Nafta Lendava (loan)	14	(0)
2013–2014	Spartak Trnava	5	(0)
2013	Spartak Trnava II	13	(1)
2014–2015	Kaisar	26	(0)
2015–2016	Akzhayik		
2016–2017	Kaisar		
2017–2018	FC Bad Radkersburg	14	(10)
2018–2024	Mura	195	(15)
2025–	SC Pinkafeld	0	(0)

International career
2012	Slovenia U21	3	(1)
- * Club domestic league appearances and goals as of 17 December 2024

Matic Maruško (born 30 November 1990) is a Slovenian footballer who plays as a midfielder for Austrian club SC Pinkafeld.

He had spells abroad in Slovakia, Kazakhstan and Austria.

== Honours ==
Mura

- Slovenian PrvaLiga: 2020–21
- Slovenian Second League: 2017–18
- Slovenian Cup: 2019–20
