= Farkhadbek Irismetov =

Kazakhstani footballer

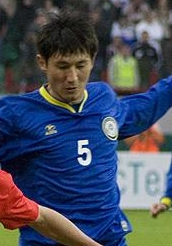

Personal information
- Full name: Farkhadbek Ravshanuly Irismetov
- Date of birth: 10 August 1981 (age 45)
- Place of birth: Shymkent, Kazakh SSR, Soviet Union
- Height: 1.77 m (5 ft 10 in)
- Position: Defender

Team information
- Current team: Turan (assistant coach)

Senior career*
Years	Team	Apps	(Gls)
2002–2004	Irtysh	87	(7)
2005–2006	Kairat	37	(1)
2007–2010	Tobol	93	(0)
2011–2012	Ordabasy	36	(0)
2012	Sunkar	7	(0)
2013–2014	Ordabasy	19	(0)
2014	→ Tobol (loan)	13	(0)
2015	Kaisar	23	(0)
2016–2018	Ordabasy	8	(0)
2018	Altai Semey	17	(0)

International career
2004–2011	Kazakhstan	35	(0)

Managerial career
- 2019: Atyrau (assistant)
- 2020: Kyran II
- 2020–: Turan (assistant)
- * Club domestic league appearances and goals

Farkhadbek Ravshanuly Irismetov (Kazakh: Фархадбек Равшанұлы Ірісметов (Farhadbek Ravşanūly Irısmetov), Uzbek: Фарҳодбек Равшан ўғли Ирисметов (Farhodbek Ravshan Oʻgʻli Irismetov); born 10 August 1981) is a Kazakhstani football coach and a former defender of Uzbekistani roots. He is an assistant coach with Turan.

== Career ==
=== Club ===
Irismetov joined FC Tobol on loan for the second half of the 2014 season.

=== International ===
Irismetov has made 34 appearances for the Kazakhstan national football team.

== Career statistics ==
=== International ===
Appearances and goals by national team and year
National team	Year	Apps	Goals
Kazakhstan	2004	5	0
Kazakhstan	2005	4	0
Kazakhstan	2006	4	0
Kazakhstan	2007	11	0
Kazakhstan	2008	5	0
Kazakhstan	2009	2	0
Kazakhstan	2010	3	0
Kazakhstan	2011	1	0
Total		35	0
