= Duman Narzildayev =

Kazakhstani footballer

Personal information
- Full name: Duman Akhmettillauly Narzildayev
- Date of birth: 6 September 1993 (age 33)
- Place of birth: Kyzylorda, Kazakhstan
- Height: 1.78 m (5 ft 10 in)
- Position: Midfielder

Team information
- Current team: Turan
- Number: 10

Youth career
- –2011: Kaisar

Senior career*
Years	Team	Apps	(Gls)
2012–2022	Kaisar	180	(12)
2022–2023	Caspiy	34	(0)
2023	Ordabasy	7	(0)
2024–2025	Kaisar	37	(1)
2026–	Turan	21	(0)

International career^{‡}
2020–	Kazakhstan	2	(0)
- * Club domestic league appearances and goals as of 2 November 2026 ‡ National team caps and goals as of 17 April 2023, 18:57 (UTC)

Duman Akhmettillauly Narzildayev (Kazakh: Думан Ахметтілләұлы Нәрзілдаев, Duman Ahmettılläūly Närzıldaev; born 6 September 1993) is a Kazakhstani footballer who plays as a midfielder for Turan.

== Club career ==
Narzildayev made his professional debut for Kaisar in the Kazakhstan Premier League on 10 March 2012, coming on as a substitute in the 89th minute for Oleksandr Sytnik in the home match against Aktobe, which finished as a 0–2 loss.

== International career ==
Narzildayev made his international debut for Kazakhstan on 14 October 2020 in the UEFA Nations League, coming on as a substitute in the 78th minute for Vladislav Vasiliev against Belarus. The away match finished as a 0–2 loss.

== Career statistics ==
=== International ===
As of 14 October 2020

Kazakhstan
Year	Apps	Goals
2020	1	0
Total	1	0
