= 2016 FC Tobol season =

FC Tobol
2016 season
- Chairman: Nikolay Panin
- Manager: Dmitriy Ogai (until 28 April); Oleg Lotov (Interim) (30 April - 30 May); Omari Tetradze (from 30 May)
- Stadium: Central Stadium
- Kazakhstan Premier League: 7th
- Kazakhstan Cup: Last 16 vs Kyzylzhar
- Top goalscorer: League: Sergei Khizhnichenko (10); All: Sergei Khizhnichenko (10)
Home colours	Away colours

The 2016 FC Tobol season is the 18th successive season that the club playing in the Kazakhstan Premier League, the highest tier of association football in Kazakhstan. Tobol finished the season 7th, top of the Relegation group, whilst the wear knocked out of the Kazakhstan Cup by Kyzylzhar at the last 16 stage.

== Season events ==
Following a surprise defeat to Kyzylzhar in the Kazakhstan Cup, manager Dmitriy Ogai left the club by mutual consent. On 30 April, Oleg Lotov was appointed as interim manager, before Omari Tetradze was appointed as the club's full-time manager on 30 May 2016.

== Squad ==
As of 26 July 2016

Note: Flags indicate national team as defined under FIFA eligibility rules; some limited exceptions apply. Players may hold more than one non-FIFA nationality.

No.	Pos.	Nation	Player
1	GK	KAZ	Vladimir Loginovsky (loan from Astana)
2	DF	KAZ	Rafkat Aslan
3	DF	CRO	Denis Glavina
4	DF	CAF	Fernander Kassaï
5	MF	LTU	Artūras Žulpa
6	MF	KAZ	Daniel Choi
7	MF	KAZ	Timur Dosmagambetov
8	DF	KAZ	Viktor Dmitrenko
9	MF	KAZ	Nurbol Zhumaskaliyev
10	FW	RUS	Shamil Asildarov
11	MF	KGZ	Raul Jalilov
17	DF	KAZ	Dmitri Miroshnichenko

No.	Pos.	Nation	Player
18	DF	KAZ	Mark Gorman
19	DF	KAZ	Nurtas Kurgulin
20	FW	MKD	Dušan Savić
22	MF	ROU	Ciprian Deac
23	DF	UKR	Serhiy Yavorskyi
28	DF	KAZ	Anuar Agaysin
30	GK	KAZ	Sultan Busurmanov
35	GK	KAZ	Aleksandr Petukhov
50	FW	KAZ	Temirlan Elmurzaev
77	MF	KAZ	Almir Mukhutdinov
81	MF	AUT	Tomáš Šimkovič
91	FW	KAZ	Sergei Khizhnichenko

=== Out on loan ===
Note: Flags indicate national team as defined under FIFA eligibility rules; some limited exceptions apply. Players may hold more than one non-FIFA nationality.

No.	Pos.	Nation	Player
14	MF	KAZ	Yevgeniy Levin (at Akzhayik)

=== Reserve team ===
Note: Flags indicate national team as defined under FIFA eligibility rules; some limited exceptions apply. Players may hold more than one non-FIFA nationality.

No.	Pos.	Nation	Player
26	DF	KAZ	Bulat Aulabaev
27	DF	KAZ	Amir Amirkhanov
29	DF	KAZ	Aset Doskaliyev
31	GK	KAZ	Oleg Atamas
32	MF	KAZ	Akhmat Berikov
33	MF	KAZ	Adil Dzhanaliyev
34	MF	KAZ	Kazhigelad Khamzin
36	DF	KAZ	Ruslan Sultanov
37	DF	KAZ	Aleksandr Zhukov
38	MF	KAZ	Zhenis Alpysbayev
39	MF	KAZ	Temirlan Akhmetov

No.	Pos.	Nation	Player
43	MF	KAZ	Adilbek Seilov
44	DF	KAZ	Nurgeldy Shaken
46	MF	KAZ	Vladimir Konovalov
49	MF	KAZ	Vladislav Kozhedub
51	FW	KAZ	Temirlan Amirgazy
52	GK	KAZ	Rasul Berdyguzhinov
70	DF	KAZ	Timur Zhakupov
80	FW	KAZ	Yevgeni Kaptel
88	MF	KAZ	Ramiz Mukanov
95	DF	KAZ	Erlan Beysembayev

== Transfers ==
=== Winter ===
In: Note: Flags indicate national team as defined under FIFA eligibility rules; some limited exceptions apply. Players may hold more than one non-FIFA nationality.

No.	Pos.	Nation	Player
1	GK	KAZ	Vladimir Loginovsky (loan from (Kazakhstan) Astana)
3	MF	CRO	Denis Glavina (loan from (Slovenia) Zavrč)
4	DF	CAF	Fernander Kassaï (from (Bulgaria) Slavia Sofia, previously on loan to (Kazakhstan) Irtysh Pavlodar)
5	MF	LTU	Artūras Žulpa (from (Kazakhstan) Aktobe)
6	DF	KAZ	Rakhimzhan Rozybakiev (from (Kazakhstan) Kaisar)
7	MF	KAZ	Timur Dosmagambetov (from (Kazakhstan) Taraz)
8	DF	KAZ	Viktor Dmitrenko (from (Kazakhstan) Aktobe)
11	MF	KAZ	Raul Jalilov (from (Kazakhstan) Bolat)
14	MF	KAZ	Yevgeniy Levin (from (Kazakhstan) Aktobe)
17	DF	KAZ	Dmitri Miroshnichenko (from (Kazakhstan) Aktobe)
22	MF	ROU	Ciprian Deac (from (Kazakhstan) Aktobe)
25	MF	FRA	Alassane N'Diaye (from (Kazakhstan) Irtysh Pavlodar)
40	FW	UKR	Kostyantyn Dudchenko (from (Kazakhstan) Irtysh Pavlodar)
77	MF	KAZ	Almir Mukhutdinov (from (Kazakhstan) Taraz)
91	FW	KAZ	Sergei Khizhnichenko (from (Kazakhstan) Aktobe)

Out: Note: Flags indicate national team as defined under FIFA eligibility rules; some limited exceptions apply. Players may hold more than one non-FIFA nationality.

No.	Pos.	Nation	Player
1	GK	KAZ	Kirill Korotkevich (to (Kazakhstan) Ordabasy)
5	MF	KAZ	Anatoli Bogdanov
7	MF	KAZ	Artem Deli
8	MF	SRB	Nenad Šljivić (to (Serbia) Spartak Subotica)
10	FW	MDA	Igor Bugaiov
11	MF	SRB	Ognjen Krasić (to (Serbia) Voždovac)
12	DF	KAZ	Ermek Nurgaliyev
13	DF	KAZ	Islam Shadukayev
14	MF	KAZ	Igor Yurin (to (Kazakhstan) Okzhetpes)
15	FW	NGR	Uche Kalu (to (Turkey) Adanaspor)
17	MF	KAZ	Oleg Nedashkovsky
20	DF	BLR	Ivan Sadownichy (to (Kazakhstan) Shakhter Karagandy)
24	DF	LTU	Arūnas Klimavičius (to (Lithuania) Trakai)
77	GK	KAZ	Arslan Satubaldin
78	FW	BLR	Ihar Zyankovich (to (Kazakhstan) Taraz)
99	FW	LTU	Deivydas Matulevičius (to (Romania) Botoșani)
—	MF	NED	Desley Ubbink (to (Kazakhstan) Shakhter Karagandy)

=== Summer ===
In: Note: Flags indicate national team as defined under FIFA eligibility rules; some limited exceptions apply. Players may hold more than one non-FIFA nationality.

No.	Pos.	Nation	Player
10	FW	RUS	Shamil Asildarov (from (Russia) Volgar Astrakhan)
18	DF	KAZ	Mark Gorman (from (Kazakhstan) Astana)
20	FW	MKD	Dušan Savić (from (Kazakhstan) Zhetysu)

Out: Note: Flags indicate national team as defined under FIFA eligibility rules; some limited exceptions apply. Players may hold more than one non-FIFA nationality.

No.	Pos.	Nation	Player
6	MF	KAZ	Rakhimzhan Rozybakiev (to (Kazakhstan) Akzhayik)
14	MF	KAZ	Yevgeniy Levin (loan to (Kazakhstan) Akzhayik)
25	MF	FRA	Alassane N'Diaye
40	FW	UKR	Kostyantyn Dudchenko (to (Kazakhstan) Akzhayik)

== Friendlies ==
23 January 2016	Tobol (Kazakhstan)	0 – 2	(Bulgaria) Levski Sofia	Turkey
(UTC+6)		Summary

3 February 2016	Tobol (Kazakhstan)	2 – 0	(Ukraine) Stal Dniprodzerzhynsk	Turkey
(UTC+6)	Yavorskyi; Deac	Summary

5 February 2016	Tobol (Kazakhstan)	0 – 1	(Hungary) Várda	Turkey
21:30 (UTC+6)		Summary	Goal

8 February 2016	Tobol (Kazakhstan)	0 – 2	(Serbia) Vojvodina	Turkey
(UTC+6)		Summary	Kovačević 40'; Meleg 77'

10 February 2016	Tobol (Kazakhstan)	2 – 1	(Bosnia and Herzegovina) Sloboda Tuzla	Turkey
21:30 (UTC+6)	Kassaï	Summary	Goal

12 February 2016	Tobol (Kazakhstan)	4 – 0	Trialist XI	Turkey
21:30 (UTC+6)	Šimkovič; Yavorskyi; Miroshnichenko	Summary

21 February 2016	Tobol (Kazakhstan)	1 – 0	(Moldova) Zaria Bălți	Belek Turkey
(UTC+6)	N'Diaye	Summary

24 February 2016	Tobol (Kazakhstan)	1 – 2	(Ukraine) Metalist Kharkiv	Belek Turkey
(UTC+6)	(pen.)	Summary	Goal

28 February 2016	Tobol (Kazakhstan)	0 – 2	(Belarus) Belshina Bobruisk	Belek Turkey
(UTC+6)		Summary	Goal

2 March 2016	Tobol (Kazakhstan)	2 – 0	(Ukraine) Dnipro Dnipropetrovsk	Belek Turkey
(UTC+6)	Šimkovič; Yavorskyi	Summary

== Competitions ==
=== Kazakhstan Premier League ===
==== Regular season ====
===== Results summary =====
Overall								Home						Away					
Pld	W	D	L	GF	GA	GD	Pts	W	D	L	GF	GA	GD	W	D	L	GF	GA	GD
22	8	4	10	28	26	+2	28	5	1	5	15	13	+2	3	3	5	13	13	0

Last updated: 26 July 2016.
Source: See Results

===== Results by round =====
Round	1	2	3	4	5	6	7	8	9	10	11	12	13	14	15	16	17	18	19	20	21	22
Ground	H	H	A	H	A	H	H	A	H	A	H	A	H	A	A	A	A	A	H	A	H	A
Result	W	W	D	L	L	D	W	L	L	D	L	L	W	W	L	W	L	D	W	L	L	W
Position	5	3	3	4	6	5	5	7	7	7	8	9	8	7	9	7	7	6	6	6	7	6

Source: See results
A = Away; H = Home; W = Win; D = Draw; L = Loss

===== Results =====
13 March 2016 1	Tobol	1 – 0	Akzhayik	Kostanay
15:00 (UTC+6)	Šimkovič (yellow card) 63'; Dudchenko 70'; Dosmagambetov (yellow card) 90'	Summary	Sergienko (yellow card) 61'	Stadium: Central Stadium; Attendance: 3,000; Referee: Marat Iskakov

19 March 2016 2	Tobol	Postponed	Atyrau	Kostanay
16:00 (UTC+6)		[ Summary]		Stadium: Central Stadium

3 April 2016 3	Tobol	3 – 0	Shakhter Karagandy	Kostanay
15:00 (UTC+6)	Mukhutdinov (yellow card) 21'; Yavorskyi 27'; Šimkovič 38'; Khizhnichenko 82' (yellow card) 90+4'; Dmitrenko (yellow card) 89'	Summary	Szöke (yellow card) 49'; Finonchenko (yellow card) 83'	Stadium: Central Stadium; Attendance: 3,000; Referee: Sergey Gorokhovodatskiy

9 April 2016 4	Ordabasy	2 – 2	Tobol	Shymkent
14:00 (UTC+6)	M.Tolebek 5'; Nurgaliev (yellow card) 35'; G.Suyumbaev (yellow card) 37' (red card) 37'; Diakate 66' (yellow card) 68'; B.Kozhabayev (yellow card) 84'	Summary	Šimkovič 22'; Mukhutdinov (yellow card) 57'; Zhumaskaliyev 90+3'	Stadium: Kazhymukan Munaitpasov Stadium; Attendance: 3,000; Referee: Viktor Antonov

13 April 2016 5	Tobol	1 – 2	Aktobe	Kostanay
17:00 (UTC+6)	Dudchenko 6'; R.Rozybakiev (yellow card) 36'; Dmitrenko (yellow card) 58'	Summary	A.Kakimov 21'; Kouadja (yellow card) 42'; Bocharov 70'	Stadium: Central Stadium; Attendance: 3,000; Referee: Denis Izmailov

17 April 2016 6	Astana	1 – 0	Tobol	Astana
16:00 (UTC+6)	Haruna 32'; Shomko (yellow card) 76'; Logvinenko (yellow card) 89'	Summary	Y.Levin (yellow card) 24'; Šimkovič (yellow card) 32'; Miroshnichenko (yellow card) 61'; R.Jalilov (yellow card) 74'	Stadium: Astana Arena; Attendance: 3,500; Referee: Aydin Rakhimbayev

23 April 2016 7	Tobol	2 – 2	Zhetysu	Kostanay
16:00 (UTC+6)	R.Jalilov 1', 14' (yellow card) 44'	Summary	Savić (yellow card) 5' (goal) 55'; Kadio (yellow card) 18'; Mojsov (yellow card) 20'; Turysbek 58'; Klein (yellow card) 87'; A.Shabanov (yellow card) 90+2'	Stadium: Central Stadium; Attendance: 2,500; Referee: Igor Chesnokov

1 May 2016 8	Tobol	1 – 0	Taraz	Kostanay
15:00 (UTC+6)	Dosmagambetov (yellow card) 53'; N'Diaye 90+4' (yellow card) 90+5'	Summary	Vorotnikov (yellow card) 42'; Shakhmetov (yellow card) 55'; D.Evstigneev (yellow card) 82'; Grigorenko (yellow card) 89'; D.Bayaliev (yellow card) 90+3'	Stadium: Central Stadium; Attendance: 3,000; Referee: Ruslan Duzmambetov

5 May 2016 9	Irtysh Pavlodar	3 – 1	Tobol	Pavlodar
18:00 (UTC+6)	Fall 25'; Malyi (yellow card) 44'; Jirsák (yellow card) 58'; R.Murtazayev 74'; Gogua 76' (pen.)	Summary	Šimkovič (yellow card) 29'; Zhumaskaliyev 44'	Stadium: Central Stadium; Attendance: 7,500; Referee: Askhat Abdanbayev

10 May 2016 10	Tobol	1 – 2	Kairat	Kostanay
16:00 (UTC+6)	Šimkovič 8' (pen.); Žulpa (yellow card) 53'	Summary	Gohou 13', 56'; A.Darabayev (yellow card) 86'	Stadium: Central Stadium; Attendance: 5,000; Referee: Bolat Karlibayev

15 May 2016 11	Okzhetpes	1 – 1	Tobol	Shchuchinsk
17:00 (UTC+6)	S.N'Ganbe 16'; Kozhamberdi (yellow card) 80'; Chyzhov (yellow card) 90+1'	Summary	Khizhnichenko 88'; N'Diaye (yellow card) 90+2'	Stadium: Zhaksy Stadium; Attendance: 550; Referee: Marat Iskakov

21 May 2016 12	Tobol	1 – 2	Atyrau	Kostanay
17:00 (UTC+6)	Zhumaskaliyev 69'; Mukhutdinov (yellow card) 90'	Summary	Damčevski 9'; Trytko (yellow card) 61'; R.Esatov (yellow card) 68'; Makas 83'	Stadium: Central Stadium; Attendance: 2,500; Referee: Bagdat Abdullaev

29 May 2016 13	Shakhter Karagandy	1 – 0	Tobol	Karaganda
17:00 ALMT (UTC+6)	Ubbink (yellow card) 17'; Baizhanov 42'; Y.Tarasov (yellow card) 81'; Y.Baginskiy (yellow card) 88'	Summary	Zhumaskaliyev (yellow card) 35'; Kurgulin (yellow card) 85'	Stadium: Shakhter Stadium; Attendance: 1,000; Referee: Denis Izmailov

2 June 2016 14	Tobol	1 – 0	Ordabasy	Kostanay
19:00 (UTC+6)	Zhumaskaliyev (yellow card) 13'; Kassaï (yellow card) 38'; Yavorskyi (yellow card) 43'; Khizhnichenko 58' (yellow card) 60'; Šimkovič (yellow card) 90+3'	Summary	Irismetov (yellow card) 55'; Kasalica (yellow card) 70'; Diakate (yellow card) 76'	Stadium: Central Stadium; Attendance: 4,000; Referee: Denis Tevyashov

11 June 2016 15	Aktobe	0 – 1	Tobol	Aktobe
20:00 (UTC+6)	D.Zhalmukan (yellow card) 17'; V.Kryukov (yellow card) 75'	Summary	Yavorskyi (yellow card) 9' (goal) 68'; Žulpa (yellow card) 54'; Dosmagambetov (yellow card) 69'; Mukhutdinov (yellow card) 87'; Loginovsky (yellow card) 88'	Stadium: Central Stadium; Attendance: 4,000; Referee: Sergey Gorokhovodatskiy

15 June 2016 16	Tobol	1 – 2	Astana	Kostanay
19:00 (UTC+6)	Y.Levin 45+1' (yellow card) 54'; Asildarov (yellow card) 82'	Summary	Maksimović 17'; A.Tagybergen 58'; Twumasi (yellow card) 78'; Haruna (yellow card) 79'; Nusserbayev (yellow card) 82'	Stadium: Central Stadium; Attendance: 3,000; Referee: Aydin Rakhimbayev

19 June 2016 17	Zhetysu	0 – 1	Tobol	Taldykorgan
18:30 (UTC+6)	Kasyanov (yellow card) 57'; Kadio (yellow card) 81'; Klein (yellow card) 90+3'	Summary	Mukhutdinov (yellow card) 52'; Šimkovič (yellow card) 68' (goal) 90+3' (pen.); Asildarov (yellow card) 81'	Stadium: Zhetysu Stadium; Attendance: 1,500; Referee: Igor Aleshin

25 June 2016 18	Taraz	2 – 0	Tobol	Taraz
19:00 (UTC+6)	Ergashev (yellow card) 17'; Tazhimbetov 29'; Mané (yellow card) 29' (goal) 79'; A.Taubay (yellow card) 72'; Grigoryev (yellow card) 76'	Summary	Yavorskyi (yellow card) 22'; Mukhutdinov (yellow card) 63'; Miroshnichenko (yellow card) 72'	Stadium: Central Stadium; Attendance: 3,000; Referee: Denis Izmailov

29 June 2016 2	Atyrau	0 – 0	Tobol	Atyrau
20:00 (UTC+6)	Muldarov (yellow card) 41'; Arzhanov (yellow card) 90+1'	Summary	Miroshnichenko (yellow card) 75'; Asildarov (yellow card) 90+3'	Stadium: Munaishy Stadium; Attendance: 4,500; Referee: Askhat Abdanbayev

3 July 2016 19	Tobol	3 – 2	Irtysh Pavlodar	Kostanay
19:00 (UTC+6)	Žulpa 18'; Šimkovič 23' (pen.) (yellow card) 40'; Asildarov 63' (pen.); Khizhnichenko (yellow card) 85'	Summary	Kerla (yellow card) 23'; Jirsák 54' (yellow card) 63'; Loria (yellow card) 57'; Jallow (yellow card) 65'; Grigalashvili 68'	Stadium: Central Stadium; Attendance: 4,000; Referee: Marat Iskakov

10 July 2016 20	Kariat	3 – 2	Tobol	Almaty
20:00 (UTC+6)	Islamkhan 49'; Kuat 60'; Tymoshchuk (yellow card) 67'; Isael 72'	Summary	Žulpa 68'; Gorman (yellow card) 69'; Khizhnichenko 76'; Glavina (yellow card) 90+3'	Stadium: Central Stadium; Attendance: 6,500; Referee: Aleksandr Gauzer

16 July 2016 21	Tobol	0 – 1	Okzhetpes	Kostanay
19:00 (UTC+6)	Zhumaskaliyev (yellow card) 76'	Summary	Ristović (yellow card) 21'; Yurin 64'; Stamenković (yellow card) 90'	Stadium: Central Stadium; Attendance: 3,500; Referee: Sergey Gorokhovodatskiy

24 July 2016 22	Akzhayik	0 – 5	Tobol	Oral
20:00 (UTC+6)	Lečić (yellow card) 78'	Summary	Šimkovič (yellow card) 11'; Žulpa (yellow card) 35' (goal) 75'; Savić 50', 56'; Zhumaskaliyev 84'; Khizhnichenko 90'	Stadium: Petr Atoyan Stadium; Attendance: 1,500; Referee: Furkat Atajanow

===== League table =====
Pos	Team	Pld	W	D	L	GF	GA	GD	Pts	Qualification
6	Aktobe	22	7	7	8	23	32	−9	28 (Note: Head-to-head record: Aktobe (7 points), Atyrau (5 points), Tobol (4 points).)	Qualification for the championship round
7	Atyrau	22	7	7	8	21	23	−2	28	Qualification for the relegation round
8	Tobol	22	8	4	10	28	26	+2	28	Qualification for the relegation round
9	Zhetysu	22	6	5	11	22	32	−10	23	Qualification for the relegation round
10	Shakhter Karagandy	22	5	6	11	10	27	−17	21	Qualification for the relegation round

Source: UEFA.com, Soccerway
Rules for classification: 1) Points; 2) Head-to-head points; 3) Head-to-head matches won; 4) Head-to-head goal difference; 5) Head-to-head goals scored; 6) Head-to-head away goals scored; 7) Goal difference; 8) Matches won; 9) Goals scored; 10) Away goals scored; 11) Draw.

==== Relegation round ====
===== Results summary =====
Overall								Home						Away					
Pld	W	D	L	GF	GA	GD	Pts	W	D	L	GF	GA	GD	W	D	L	GF	GA	GD
10	4	1	5	12	14	−2	13	3	1	1	8	4	+4	1	0	4	4	10	−6

Last updated: 31 October 2016.
Source: See Results

===== Results by round =====
Round	1	2	3	4	5	6	7	8	9	10
Ground	H	A	H	A	H	H	A	H	A	A
Result	D	L	W	L	W	W	W	L	L	L
Position	7	7	7	7	7	7	7	7	7	7

Source: See results
A = Away; H = Home; W = Win; D = Draw; L = Loss

===== Results =====
14 August 2016 1	Tobol	0 – 0	Atyrau	Kostanay
19:00 (UTC+6)	Dosmagambetov (yellow card) 56'; Kassaï (yellow card) 61'; Dmitrenko (red card) 85'	Summary	Sharpar (red card) 85'; Essame (yellow card) 90+3'	Stadium: Central Stadium; Attendance: 3,000; Referee: Ruslan Duzmambetov

21 August 2016 2	Zhetysu	2 – 0	Tobol	Taldykorgan
17:00 (UTC+6)	V.Borovskiy (yellow card) 21'; Beglaryan 65'; Kasyanov 76' (yellow card) 76'	Summary	Savić (yellow card) 14'; Miroshnichenko (yellow card) 23'	Stadium: Zhetysu Stadium; Attendance: 1,500; Referee: Daniyar Sakhi

26 August 2016 3	Tobol	2 – 0	Shakhter Karagandy	Kostanay
19:00 (UTC+6)	Deac (yellow card) 19'; Khizhnichenko 66', 72' (yellow card) 70'	Summary	I.Pikalkin (yellow card) 3'; Y.Goryachi (yellow card) 70'; Simonovski (yellow card) 83'	Stadium: Central Stadium; Attendance: 2,000; Referee: Marat Iskakov

10 September 2016 4	Akzhayik	1 – 0	Tobol	Oral
18:30 (UTC+6)	Lečić 51'; Govedarica (yellow card) 56'; Dudchenko (yellow card) 65'	Summary	Savić (yellow card) 41'; Miroshnichenko (yellow card) 54'; Zhumaskaliyev (yellow card) 86'	Stadium: Petr Atoyan Stadium; Attendance: 2,000; Referee: Stanislav Lesiv

18 September 2016 5	Tobol	3 – 1	Taraz	Kostanay
19:00 (UTC+6)	Glavina 39'; Šimkovič 53' (pen.); Khizhnichenko (yellow card) 81'; Asildarov 88'	Summary	Yakovlyev 2'; T.Danilyuk (yellow card) 53'	Stadium: Central Stadium; Attendance: 1,500; Referee: Denis Tevyashov

24 September 2016 6	Tobol	3 – 2	Zhetysu	Kostanay
16:00 (UTC+6)	Šimkovič 14' (pen.); Khizhnichenko 56', 90'	Summary	Djermanović 4'; S.Sagyndykov (yellow card) 55'; V.Borovskiy 60' (yellow card) 80'	Stadium: Central Stadium; Attendance: 1,500; Referee: Georgiy Chekhovskiy

1 October 2016 7	Shakhter Karagandy	2 – 3	Tobol	Karaganda
18:00 (UTC+6)	Simonovski 82', 85'	Summary	Glavina (yellow card) 11'; Khizhnichenko 53'; Šimkovič 67'; Deac 76'; Kurgulin (yellow card) 90+4'	Stadium: Shakhter Stadium; Attendance: 1,500; Referee: Marat Iskakov

16 October 2016 8	Tobol	0 – 1	Akzhayik	Kostanay
16:00 (UTC+6)	Mukhutdinov (yellow card) 5'; Šimkovič (yellow card) 21'; Miroshnichenko (yellow card) 53'; Zhumaskaliyev (red card) 54'; Yavorskyi (yellow card) 80'	Summary	Lečić (yellow card) 10'; Coronel 52'; Odibe (yellow card) 80'; A.Shurygin (yellow card) 84'; D.Tolebaev (yellow card) 90+1'	Stadium: Central Stadium; Attendance: 1,200; Referee: Furkhat Atazhanov

22 October 2016 9	Taraz	2 – 1	Tobol	Taraz
15:00 (UTC+6)	Mané 20'; Mera 23'; A.Taubay (yellow card) 72'; Grigoryev (yellow card) 79'	Summary	R.Jalilov (yellow card) 42'; Khizhnichenko (yellow card) 47'; Mukhutdinov (yellow card) 58'; Deac 88'	Stadium: Central Stadium; Attendance: 2,500; Referee: Grigory Moskovchenko

29 October 2016 10	Atyrau	3 – 0	Tobol	Atyrau
15:00 (UTC+6)	Sharpar 3' (pen.) (yellow card) 5'; A.Saparov (yellow card) 31'; Curtean (yellow card) 38'; Kassaï 47' (o.g.); Essame 66'; Fedin (yellow card) 89'	Summary	Dmitrenko (yellow card) 3'; Gorman (yellow card) 73'; T.Elmurzayev (yellow card) 90'	Stadium: Munaishy Stadium; Attendance: 1,500; Referee: Marat Iskakov

===== League table =====
Pos	Team	Pld	W	D	L	GF	GA	GD	Pts	Relegation
7	Tobol	32	12	5	15	40	40	0	41	
8	Atyrau	32	10	9	13	35	39	−4	39	
9	Shakhter Karagandy	32	10	6	16	25	40	−15	36	
10	Akzhayik	32	11	2	19	27	50	−23	35 (Note: Head-to-head record; Taraz–Akzhayik 0–1, Akzhayik–Taraz 2–1, Akzhayik–Taraz 2–0, Taraz–Akzhayik 2–1.)	
11	Taraz	32	10	5	17	33	42	−9	35	Qualification for the relegation play-offs (Note: Despite finishing 11th and losing the relegation playoffs, Taraz were readmitted because only one team was given a license.)
12	Zhetysu (R)	32	8	7	17	37	53	−16	31	Relegation to the Kazakhstan First Division

Source: Soccerway
Rules for classification: 1) Points; 2) Head-to-head points; 3) Head-to-head matches won; 4) Head-to-head goal difference; 5) Head-to-head goals scored; 6) Head-to-head away goals scored; 7) Goal difference; 8) Matches won; 9) Goals scored; 10) Away goals scored; 11) Draw.
(R) Relegated

=== Kazakhstan Cup ===
27 April 2016 Last 16	Tobol	0 – 0 (2 – 4 p)	Kyzylzhar	Kostanay
17:00 (UTC+6)	Kurgulin (yellow card) 64'	Summary	A.Dzhanuzakov (yellow card) 95'	Stadium: Central Stadium; Attendance: 1,800; Referee: Bolat Saryev

== Squad statistics ==
As of Match played 29 October 2016

=== Appearances and goals ===
No.	Pos	Nat	Player	Total		Premier League		Kazakhstan Cup	
No.	Pos	Nat	Player	Apps	Goals	Apps	Goals	Apps	Goals
1	GK	(Kazakhstan) KAZ	Vladimir Loginovsky	24	0	24	0	0	0
2	DF	(Kazakhstan) KAZ	Rafkat Aslan	1	0	1	0	0	0
3	MF	(Croatia) CRO	Denis Glavina	28	1	26+1	1	1	0
4	DF	(Central African Republic) CAF	Fernander Kassaï	25	0	25	0	0	0
5	MF	(Lithuania) LTU	Artūras Žulpa	24	3	21+2	3	1	0
7	MF	(Kazakhstan) KAZ	Timur Dosmagambetov	24	0	9+14	0	1	0
8	DF	(Kazakhstan) KAZ	Viktor Dmitrenko	18	0	16+2	0	0	0
9	MF	(Kazakhstan) KAZ	Nurbol Zhumaskaliyev	27	4	24+3	4	0	0
10	FW	(Russia) RUS	Shamil Asildarov	18	2	8+10	2	0	0
11	MF	(Kyrgyzstan) KGZ	Raul Jalilov	20	2	7+12	2	1	0
14	MF	(Kazakhstan) KAZ	Yevgeniy Levin	5	1	2+2	1	1	0
17	DF	(Kazakhstan) KAZ	Dmitri Miroshnichenko	30	0	29+1	0	0	0
18	DF	(Kazakhstan) KAZ	Mark Gorman	14	0	13+1	0	0	0
19	DF	(Kazakhstan) KAZ	Nurtas Kurgulin	6	0	2+3	0	1	0
20	FW	(North Macedonia) MKD	Dušan Savić	9	2	8+1	2	0	0
22	MF	(Romania) ROU	Ciprian Deac	32	2	29+2	2	0+1	0
23	DF	(Ukraine) UKR	Serhiy Yavorskyi	29	2	26+2	2	1	0
30	GK	(Kazakhstan) KAZ	Sultan Busurmanov	1	0	1	0	0	0
35	GK	(Kazakhstan) KAZ	Aleksandr Petukhov	8	0	7	0	1	0
37	DF	(Kazakhstan) KAZ	Aleksandr Zhukov	1	0	0+1	0	0	0
50	FW	(Kazakhstan) KAZ	Temirlan Elmurzayev	2	0	1+1	0	0	0
77	MF	(Kazakhstan) KAZ	Almir Mukhutdinov	24	0	21+2	0	0+1	0
81	MF	(Austria) AUT	Tomáš Šimkovič	28	8	25+3	8	0	0
91	FW	(Kazakhstan) KAZ	Sergei Khizhnichenko	29	10	20+8	10	0+1	0
Players away from Tobol on loan:
Players who appeared for Tobol that left during the season:
6	DF	(Kazakhstan) KAZ	Rakhimzhan Rozybakiev	4	0	2+1	0	1	0
25	MF	(France) FRA	Alassane N'Diaye	11	1	3+7	1	1	0
40	FW	(Ukraine) UKR	Kostyantyn Dudchenko	12	2	3+8	2	1	0

=== Goal scorers ===
Place	Position	Nation	Number	Name	Premier League	Kazakhstan Cup	Total
1	FW	(Kazakhstan)	91	Sergei Khizhnichenko	10	0	10
2	MF	(Austria)	81	Tomáš Šimkovič	8	0	8
3	MF	(Kazakhstan)	9	Nurbol Zhumaskaliyev	4	0	4
4	MF	(Lithuania)	5	Artūras Žulpa	3	0	3
5	FW	(Ukraine)	40	Kostyantyn Dudchenko	2	0	2
5	MF	(Kyrgyzstan)	11	Raul Jalilov	2	0	2
5	DF	(Ukraine)	23	Serhiy Yavorskyi	2	0	2
5	FW	(North Macedonia)	20	Dušan Savić	2	0	2
5	FW	(Russia)	10	Shamil Asildarov	2	0	2
5	MF	(Romania)	22	Ciprian Deac	2	0	2
11	MF	(France)	25	Alassane N'Diaye	1	0	1
11	MF	(Kazakhstan)	14	Yevgeniy Levin	1	0	1
11	MF	(Croatia)	3	Denis Glavina	1	0	1
				TOTALS	40	0	40

=== Disciplinary record ===
Number	Nation	Position	Name	Premier League		Kazakhstan Cup		Total	
Number	Nation	Position	Name	Yellow card	Red card	Yellow card	Red card	Yellow card	Red card
1	(Kazakhstan)	DF	Vladimir Loginovsky	1	0	0	0	1	0
3	(Croatia)	MF	Denis Glavina	2	0	0	0	2	0
4	(Central African Republic)	DF	Fernander Kassaï	2	0	0	0	2	0
5	(Lithuania)	MF	Artūras Žulpa	3	0	0	0	3	0
6	(Kazakhstan)	DF	Rakhimzhan Rozybakiev	1	0	0	0	1	0
7	(Kazakhstan)	MF	Timur Dosmagambetov	4	0	0	0	4	0
8	(Kazakhstan)	DF	Viktor Dmitrenko	3	1	0	0	3	1
9	(Kazakhstan)	MF	Nurbol Zhumaskaliyev	4	1	0	0	4	1
10	(Russia)	FW	Shamil Asildarov	3	0	0	0	3	0
11	(Kyrgyzstan)	MF	Raul Jalilov	3	0	0	0	3	0
14	(Kazakhstan)	DF	Yevgeniy Levin	2	0	0	0	2	0
17	(Kazakhstan)	DF	Dmitri Miroshnichenko	6	0	0	0	6	0
18	(Kazakhstan)	DF	Mark Gorman	2	0	0	0	2	0
19	(Kazakhstan)	DF	Nurtas Kurgulin	2	0	1	0	3	0
20	(North Macedonia)	FW	Dušan Savić	2	0	0	0	2	0
22	(Romania)	MF	Ciprian Deac	1	0	0	0	1	0
23	(Ukraine)	DF	Serhiy Yavorskyi	4	0	0	0	4	0
25	(France)	MF	Alassane N'Diaye	2	0	0	0	2	0
50	(Kazakhstan)	FW	Temirlan Elmurzayev	1	0	0	0	1	0
77	(Kazakhstan)	MF	Almir Mukhutdinov	8	0	0	0	8	0
81	(Austria)	MF	Tomáš Šimkovič	8	0	0	0	8	0
91	(Kazakhstan)	FW	Sergei Khizhnichenko	6	0	0	0	6	0
			TOTALS	73	2	1	0	74	2
