= 2016 FC Zhetysu season =

FC Zhetysu
2016 season
- Chairman: Evgeniy Nam
- Manager: Almas Kulshinbaev
- Stadium: Zhetysu Stadium
Home colours	Away colours

The 2016 FC Zhetysu season is the 10th successive season that the club playing in the Kazakhstan Premier League, the highest tier of association football in Kazakhstan, and 20th in total. Zhetysu will also take part in the Kazakhstan Cup.

== Squad ==
As of 6 July 2016

Note: Flags indicate national team as defined under FIFA eligibility rules; some limited exceptions apply. Players may hold more than one non-FIFA nationality.

No.	Pos.	Nation	Player
1	GK	KAZ	Andrey Shabanov
2	DF	KAZ	Temirlan Adilkhanov
6	MF	KAZ	Michael Harun-Zadeh
8	DF	KAZ	Serik Sagyndykov
9	FW	SLO	Dejan Djermanović
10	FW	KAZ	Toktar Zhangylyshbay
11	MF	KAZ	Vadim Borovskiy
12	MF	UKR	Artem Kasyanov
13	DF	KAZ	Ilyas Amirseitov
14	FW	ARM	Narek Beglaryan
15	MF	KAZ	Ruslan Barzukayev
17	DF	KAZ	Dias Mynbayev

No.	Pos.	Nation	Player
18	DF	KAZ	Maksim Azovskiy
20	GK	KAZ	Andrey Pasechenko
21	DF	KAZ	Berik Shaikhov (loan from Astana)
22	MF	KAZ	Ilia Kalinin
23	MF	KAZ	Adil Balgabaev
25	MF	KAZ	Zhaksylyk Seydakhmetov
27	DF	KAZ	Andrey Shabaev
30	GK	KAZ	Eric Duysenbekuly
44	DF	CZE	Martin Klein
86	DF	SRB	Marko Đalović
90	DF	FRA	Mamadou Wague

== Transfers ==
=== Winter ===
In: Note: Flags indicate national team as defined under FIFA eligibility rules; some limited exceptions apply. Players may hold more than one non-FIFA nationality.

No.	Pos.	Nation	Player
7	FW	BLR	Filip Rudzik (from (Belarus) Shakhtyor Soligorsk)
11	MF	KAZ	Vadim Borovskiy (from (Kazakhstan) Kyzylzhar)
14	MF	MKD	Gjorgji Mojsov (from (North Macedonia) Renova)
22	MF	KAZ	Ilia Kalinin (from (Kazakhstan) Kaisar)
24	FW	MKD	Marko Simonovski (from (Croatia) RNK Split)
27	DF	KAZ	Andrey Shabaev (from (Kazakhstan) Vostok)
44	DF	CZE	Martin Klein (from (Kazakhstan) Kaisar)
57	DF	CIV	Didier Kadio (from (Finland) FF Jaro)
86	MF	SRB	Marko Đalović (from (Serbia) Novi Pazar)
87	FW	CIV	Boti Goa (from (Georgia (country)) Guria Lanchkhuti)

Out: Note: Flags indicate national team as defined under FIFA eligibility rules; some limited exceptions apply. Players may hold more than one non-FIFA nationality.

No.	Pos.	Nation	Player
4	DF	TJK	Davron Ergashev (to (Tajikistan) Istiklol)
5	MF	KAZ	Marat Shakhmetov (to (Kazakhstan) Taraz)
6	MF	RUS	Mikhail Petrolay (loan return to (Russia) Rubin Kazan)
7	MF	KAZ	Sayat Sariyev
11	MF	KAZ	Marlan Muzhikov
14	DF	KAZ	Yevgeni Goryachi (to (Kazakhstan) Shakhter Karagandy)
16	GK	KAZ	Rimas Martinkus
19	MF	UZB	Bobir Davlyatov (loan return to (Russia) Rubin Kazan)
21	FW	AZE	Elbeyi Guliyev (loan return to (Russia) Ural)
22	GK	KAZ	Erik Duysenbekuly
23	FW	RUS	Ruslan Galiakberov (loan return to (Russia) Rubin Kazan)
88	DF	RUS	Aleksei Gerasimov (loan return to (Russia) Ural)
91	MF	RUS	Ilsur Samigullin (loan return to (Russia) Rubin Kazan)

=== Summer ===
In: Note: Flags indicate national team as defined under FIFA eligibility rules; some limited exceptions apply. Players may hold more than one non-FIFA nationality.

No.	Pos.	Nation	Player
9	FW	SLO	Dejan Djermanović (from (Bosnia and Herzegovina) Željezničar Sarajevo)
10	FW	KAZ	Toktar Zhangylyshbay (from (Kazakhstan) Aktobe)
12	MF	UKR	Artem Kasyanov (from (Ukraine) Metalist Kharkiv)
14	FW	ARM	Narek Beglaryan (from (Armenia) Gandzasar Kapan)
21	DF	KAZ	Berik Shaikhov (loan from (Kazakhstan) Astana)
90	DF	FRA	Mamadou Wague (from (Sweden) Assyriska)

Out: Note: Flags indicate national team as defined under FIFA eligibility rules; some limited exceptions apply. Players may hold more than one non-FIFA nationality.

No.	Pos.	Nation	Player
7	MF	BLR	Filip Rudzik
9	MF	KAZ	Bauyrzhan Turysbek (to (Kazakhstan) Kairat)
10	FW	MKD	Dušan Savić (to (Kazakhstan) Tobol)
14	MF	MKD	Gjorgji Mojsov
24	FW	MKD	Marko Simonovski (to (Kazakhstan) Shakhter Karagandy)
57	DF	CIV	Didier Kadio (to (India) Kerala Blasters)
87	FW	CIV	Boti Goa

== Friendlies ==
23 January 2016	Zhetysu (Kazakhstan)	1 – 1	(South Korea) Jeonbuk Hyundai Motors	United Arab Emirates
(UTC+6)	Savić	Summary

25 January 2016	Zhetysu (Kazakhstan)	1 – 2	(Russia) Krasnodar	Abu Dhabi, United Arab Emirates
(UTC+6)	Turysbek 15' (yellow card) 61'	Summary	Wánderson 11'; Mamayev 75' (pen.); Kaboré (yellow card) 87'	Stadium: Zayed Sports City Stadium; Referee: Al Hansori

30 January 2016	Zhetysu (Kazakhstan)	2 – 1	(Uzbekistan) Bunyodkor	Dubai, United Arab Emirates
(UTC+6)	Turysbek 42'; Rudzik	Summary	Shomurodov 11'	Stadium: The Sevens Stadium

18 February 2016	Zhetysu (Kazakhstan)	1 – 0	(Armenia) Alashkert	Belek, Turkey
(UTC+6)	Simonovski	Summary

== Competitions ==
=== Kazakhstan Premier League ===
==== Regular season ====
===== Results summary =====
Overall								Home						Away					
Pld	W	D	L	GF	GA	GD	Pts	W	D	L	GF	GA	GD	W	D	L	GF	GA	GD
22	6	5	11	21	31	−10	23	3	3	5	10	14	−4	3	2	6	11	17	−6

Last updated: 26 July 2016.
Source: See Results

===== Results by round =====
Round	1	2	3	4	5	6	7	8	9	10	11	12	13	14	15	16	17	18	19	20	21	22
Ground	H	A	H	A	H	H	A	H	H	A	A	H	A	H	A	A	H	A	H	A	H	A
Result	D	D	L	L	L	W	D	L	L	W	W	W	W	D	L	W	L	L	D	L	W	L
Position	7	6	8	10	10	8	8	9	11	11	9	9	7	7	9	8	9	9	9	9	9	9

Source: See results
A = Away; H = Home; W = Win; D = Draw; L = Loss

===== Results =====
12 March 2016 1	Zhetysu	1 – 1	Atyrau	Taldykorgan
15:00 (UTC+6)	Goa (yellow card) 40'; Turysbek 60'	Summary	Konysbayev 19'; V.Kuzmin (yellow card) 53'; Makas (yellow card) 56'	Stadium: Zhetysu Stadium; Attendance: 2,000; Referee: Aydin Rakhimbayev

20 March 2016 2	Shakhter Karagandy	0 – 0	Zhetysu	Karaganda
15:00 (UTC+6)	Y.Goryachi (yellow card) 50'; Arzumanyan (yellow card) 56'	Summary		Stadium: Shakhter Stadium; Attendance: 3,000; Referee: Viktor Antonov

3 April 2016 3	Zhetysu	1 – 2	Ordabasy	Taldykorgan
15:00 (UTC+6)	Rudzik (yellow card) 28'; Kadio 90'	Summary	Junuzović 25'; Simčević (yellow card) 27'; E.Tungyshbaev (yellow card) 33' (yellow-red card) 67'; Nurgaliev 38'; Boychenko (yellow card) 80'	Stadium: Zhetysu Stadium; Attendance: 1,500; Referee: Aleksandr Aliyev

9 April 2016 4	Aktobe	3 – 2	Zhetysu	Astana
19:00 (UTC+6)	Smakov 15'; Bocharov 25'; A.Kakimov (yellow card) 51'; Shestakov (yellow card) 69'; Petrolay (yellow card) 85'; Zhangylyshbay 87' (yellow card) 87'; Kouadja (yellow card) 88'	Summary	Klein 52'; Savić 89'; Goa (yellow card) 90'	Stadium: Astana Arena; Attendance: 1,000; Referee: Bagdat Abdullaev

13 April 2016 5	Zhetysu	0 – 1	Astana	Taldykorgan
16:00 (UTC+6)	T.Adilkhanov (yellow card) 76'; Turysbek (yellow card) 83'; Simonovski (yellow card) 86'; Kadio (yellow card) 90+4'	Summary	Despotović (yellow card) 67'; Logvinenko 78'; Shchotkin (yellow card) 88' (yellow-red card) 89'; Muzhikov (yellow card) 90+4'	Stadium: Zhetysu Stadium; Attendance: 1,700; Referee: Daniyar Sakhi

17 April 2016 6	Zhetysu	2 – 1	Taraz	Taldykorgan
16:00 (UTC+6)	Savić 47'; Rudzik (yellow card) 60'; Mojsov 90+1' (yellow card) 90+1'	Summary	M.Amirkhanov (yellow card) 24'; Mané 65'; Shakhmetov (yellow card) 89'	Stadium: Zhetysu Stadium; Attendance: 1,200; Referee: Artyom Kuchin

23 April 2016 7	Tobol	2 – 2	Zhetysu	Kostanay
16:00 (UTC+6)	R.Jalilov 1', 14' (yellow card) 44'	Summary	Savić (yellow card) 5' (goal) 55'; Kadio (yellow card) 18'; Mojsov (yellow card) 20'; Turysbek 58'; Klein (yellow card) 87'; A.Shabanov (yellow card) 90+2'	Stadium: Central Stadium; Attendance: 2,500; Referee: Igor Chesnokov

1 May 2016 8	Zhetysu	0 – 3	Irtysh Pavlodar	Taldykorgan
17:00 (UTC+6)		Summary	R.Murtazayev 39', 41'; Fonseca (yellow card) 69'; Gogua (yellow card) 80'; Herrera 90+3'	Stadium: Zhetysu Stadium; Attendance: 2,500; Referee: Bolat Karlibayev

5 May 2016 9	Kairat	2 – 0	Zhetysu	Almaty
19:30 (UTC+6)	Turysbek 25' (o.g.); Tawamba 72'; Bakayev (yellow card) 82'	Summary	Turysbek (yellow card) 90+2'	Stadium: Central Stadium; Attendance: 8,000; Referee: Bagdat Abdullaev

10 May 2016 10	Zhetysu	1 – 4	Okzhetpes	Taldykorgan
17:00 (UTC+6)	T.Adilkhanov (yellow card) 10'; Simonovski 78'	Summary	Khayrullin 2', 90+4'; A.Kuksin (yellow card) 26'; S.N'Ganbe 32'; Z.Moldakaraev 59'; Chyzhov (yellow card) 89'	Stadium: Zhetysu Stadium; Attendance: 1,500; Referee: Ruslan Duzmambetov

15 May 2016 11	Akzhayik	1 – 2	Zhetysu	Oral
18:00 (UTC+6)	A.Maltsev (yellow card) 9'; M.Sapanov (yellow card) 34'; Hromțov 80'; R.Khairov (yellow card) 84'	Summary	Simonovski 3' (yellow card) 51'; Mojsov (yellow card) 26'; S.Sagyndykov (yellow card) 30'; Klein (yellow card) 58'; Savić 90+1' (pen.)	Stadium: Petr Atoyan Stadium; Attendance: 3,000; Referee: Askhat Abdanbayev

21 May 2016 12	Zhetysu	2 – 0	Shakhter Karagandy	Taldykorgan
17:30 (UTC+6)	S.Sagyndykov (yellow card) 45+1'; Savić 57'; I.Kalinin 64'; Turysbek (yellow card) 84'	Summary	I.Pikalkin (yellow card) 45'; Yaghoubi (yellow card) 84'	Stadium: Zhetysu Stadium; Attendance: 2,300; Referee: Aleksander Gauzer

29 May 2016 13	Ordabasy	0 – 1	Zhetysu	Shymkent
17:00 (UTC+6)	G.Suyumbaev (yellow card) 38'; Diakate (yellow card) 44'; E.Tungyshbaev (yellow card) 84'	Summary	Savić 11'; S.Sagyndykov (yellow card) 34'; I.Amirseitov (yellow card) 43'; Đalović (yellow card) 44'	Stadium: Kazhymukan Munaitpasov Stadium; Attendance: 4,000; Referee: Igor Aleshin

2 June 2016 14	Zhetysu	1 – 1	Aktobe	Taldykorgan
17:30 (UTC+6)	Savić (yellow card) 8'; I.Amirseitov 73'	Summary	Tsveiba 70'; Sitdikov (yellow card) 74'; Sorokin (yellow card) 90+3'	Stadium: Zhetysu Stadium; Attendance: 1,000; Referee: Marat Iskakov

11 June 2016 15	Astana	1 – 0	Zhetysu	Astana
16:00 (UTC+6)	Beisebekov (yellow card) 17' (yellow-red card) 65'; Nusserbayev 45'; Cañas (yellow card) 64'; Shchotkin (yellow card) 90+3'	Summary	Klein (yellow card) 39'; Simonovski (yellow card) 65'	Stadium: Astana Arena; Attendance: 2,000; Referee: Anatolyi Vishnichenko

15 June 2016 16	Taraz	2 – 3	Zhetysu	Taraz
19:00 (UTC+6)	M.Nuraly (yellow card) 23'; T.Danilyuk (yellow card) 31'; Mera (yellow card) 52' (goal) 90'; B.Baitana (yellow card) 82' (yellow-red card) 90+2'; S.Bauyrzhan (yellow card) 82'; Mané 84'	Summary	Savić 28', 53', 67'; A.Pasechenko (yellow card) 58'; Đalović (yellow card) 82'	Stadium: Central Stadium; Attendance: 2,000; Referee: Furkat Atajanow

19 June 2016 17	Zhetysu	0 – 1	Tobol	Taldykorgan
18:30 (UTC+6)	Kasyanov (yellow card) 57'; Kadio (yellow card) 81'; Klein (yellow card) 90+3'	Summary	Mukhutdinov (yellow card) 52'; Šimkovič (yellow card) 68' (goal) 90+3' (pen.); Asildarov (yellow card) 81'	Stadium: Zhetysu Stadium; Attendance: 1,500; Referee: Igor Aleshin

25 June 2016 18	Irtysh Pavlodar	3 – 1	Zhetysu	Pavlodar
19:00 (UTC+6)	Jallow 33'; Ignacio Herrera\Herrera 81'; Freidgeimas (yellow card) 85'; R.Murtazayev 87'; Fonseca (yellow card) 90+1'	Summary	V.Borovskiy 12' (yellow card) 23' (yellow-red card) 53'; Savić (yellow card) 82'	Stadium: Central Stadium; Attendance: 4,000; Referee: Bolat Karlibayev

3 July 2016 19	Zhetysu	1 – 1	Kairat	Taldykorgan
18:00 (UTC+6)	Savić 37'; Kadio (yellow card) 73'	Summary	Tesák (yellow card) 77'; Isael (yellow card) 80'; Gohou 90'	Stadium: Zhetysu Stadium; Attendance: 2,000; Referee: Viktor Antonov

10 July 2016 20	Okzhetpes	2 – 0	Zhetysu	Kokshetau
19:00 (UTC+6)	Buleshev 63' (yellow card) 63'; Kozhamberdi (yellow card) 71'; Chyzhov (yellow card) 89'; Z.Moldakaraev 90+1'	Summary	I.Amirseitov (yellow card) 60'; Klein (yellow card) 70'; A.Shabaev (yellow card) 87'	Stadium: Okzhetpes Stadium; Attendance: 1,500; Referee: Aleksandr Aliyev

16 July 2016 21	Zhetysu	2 – 0	Akzhayik	Taldykorgan
18:00 (UTC+6)	Klein (yellow card) 27'; Đalović 68'; Kadio 70'	Summary	E.Abdrakhmanov (yellow card) 14'; Shakhmetov (yellow card) 73'; R.Rozybakiev (yellow card) 79'	Stadium: Zhetysu Stadium; Attendance: 2,000; Referee: Daniyar Sakhi

24 July 2016 22	Atyrau	1 – 0	Zhetysu	Atyrau
20:00 (UTC+6)	Trytko 79'	Summary	Kasyanov (yellow card) 45'; S.Sagyndykov (yellow card) 90'	Stadium: Munaishy Stadium; Attendance: 4,000; Referee: Igor Aleshin

===== League table =====
Pos	Team	Pld	W	D	L	GF	GA	GD	Pts	Qualification
7	Atyrau	22	7	7	8	21	23	−2	28 (Note: Head-to-head record: Aktobe (7 points), Atyrau (5 points), Tobol (4 points).)	Qualification for the relegation round
8	Tobol	22	8	4	10	28	26	+2	28	Qualification for the relegation round
9	Zhetysu	22	6	5	11	22	32	−10	23	Qualification for the relegation round
10	Shakhter Karagandy	22	5	6	11	10	27	−17	21	Qualification for the relegation round
11	Taraz	22	5	4	13	22	30	−8	19	Qualification for the relegation round

Source: UEFA.com, Soccerway
Rules for classification: 1) Points; 2) Head-to-head points; 3) Head-to-head matches won; 4) Head-to-head goal difference; 5) Head-to-head goals scored; 6) Head-to-head away goals scored; 7) Goal difference; 8) Matches won; 9) Goals scored; 10) Away goals scored; 11) Draw.

==== Relegation round ====
===== Results summary =====
Overall								Home						Away					
Pld	W	D	L	GF	GA	GD	Pts	W	D	L	GF	GA	GD	W	D	L	GF	GA	GD
10	2	2	6	15	21	−6	8	2	1	2	7	7	0	0	1	4	8	14	−6

Last updated: 31 October 2016.
Source: See Results

===== Results by round =====
Round	1	2	3	4	5	6	7	8	9	10
Ground	A	H	A	A	H	A	H	H	A	H
Result	L	W	D	L	L	L	W	D	L	L
Position	10	9	9	9	10	10	10	10	12	12

Source: See results
A = Away; H = Home; W = Win; D = Draw; L = Loss

===== Results =====
14 August 2016 1	Akzhayik	1 – 0	Zhetysu	Oral
19:00 (UTC+6)	Govedarica (yellow card) 21'; Lečić 60' (pen.); Sergienko (yellow card) 80'	Summary	I.Amirseitov (yellow card) 59'; Kasyanov (yellow card) 63'; Beglaryan (yellow card) 80'; Zhangylyshbay (yellow card) 80' (yellow-red card) 90+5'	Stadium: Petr Atoyan Stadium; Attendance: 2,500; Referee: Igor Aleshin

21 August 2016 2	Zhetysu	2 – 0	Tobol	Taldykorgan
17:00 (UTC+6)	V.Borovskiy (yellow card) 21'; Beglaryan 65'; Kasyanov 76' (yellow card) 76'	Summary	Savić (yellow card) 14'; D.Miroshnichenko (yellow card) 23'	Stadium: Zhetysu Stadium; Attendance: 1,500; Referee: Daniyar Sakhi

26 August 2016 3	Atyrau	3 – 3	Zhetysu	Atyrau
19:30 (UTC+6)	Arzhanov 12', 72'; Trytko 52'; Korobkin (yellow card) 82'	Summary	T.Adilkhanov (yellow card) 59'; Djermanović 64'; I.Kalinin (yellow card) 69'; Đalović 86' (yellow card) 90+1'; Beglaryan 89'	Stadium: Munaishy Stadium; Attendance: 1,800; Referee: Timur Kumashev

10 September 2016 4	Taraz	3 – 2	Zhetysu	Taraz
19:00 (UTC+6)	Mané 2', 16' (pen.), 48'; A.Taubay (yellow card) 18'; Vorotnikov (yellow card) 22'; A.Suley (yellow card) 80'	Summary	S.Sagyndykov (yellow card) 25'; V.Borovskiy 28'; Wague (yellow card) 39' (yellow-red card) 90'; Zhangylyshbay 43'; Klein (yellow card) 78'	Stadium: Central Stadium; Attendance: 4,000; Referee: Aleksandr Aliyev

18 September 2016 5	Zhetysu	1 – 2	Shakhter Karagandy	Taldykorgan
16:00 (UTC+6)	Zhangylyshbay (yellow card) 28'; S.Sagyndykov (yellow card) 66'; Djermanović 82'	Summary	Y.Tarasov (yellow card) 56'; Szöke 90+1'; Y.Goryachi 90+4'	Stadium: Zhetysu Stadium; Attendance: 1,000; Referee: Sergey Gorokhovodatskiy

24 September 2016 6	Tobol	3 – 2	Zhetysu	Kostanay
16:00 (UTC+6)	Šimkovič 14' (pen.); Khizhnichenko 56', 90'	Summary	Djermanović 4'; S.Sagyndykov (yellow card) 55'; V.Borovskiy 60' (yellow card) 80'	Stadium: Central Stadium; Attendance: 1,500; Referee: Georgiy Chekhovskiy

1 October 2016 7	Zhetysu	4 – 3	Atyrau	Taldykorgan
16:30 (UTC+6)	Kasyanov 27'; I.Amirseitov (yellow card) 41'; Djermanović 54', 59'; Zhangylyshbay 85'	Summary	Fedin 12'; Trytko 24'; Arzhanov 29'; Lamanje (yellow card) 84'	Stadium: Zhetysu Stadium; Attendance: 1,200; Referee: Daniyar Sakhi

16 October 2016 8	Zhetysu	0 – 0	Taraz	Taldykorgan
16:30 (UTC+6)	Klein (yellow card) 54'; Beglaryan (yellow card) 87'; Zhangylyshbay (yellow card) 90+1'	Summary	Yevstigneyev (yellow card) 54'; Pyschur (yellow card) 54'; Tazhimbetov (yellow card) 54'; Mané (yellow card) 87'; A.Taubay (yellow card) 87'; Yakovlyev (yellow card) 90'	Stadium: Zhetysu Stadium; Attendance: 1,200; Referee: Denis Tevyashov

22 October 2016 9	Shakhter Karagandy	4 – 1	Zhetysu	Karaganda
15:00 (UTC+6)	Szöke 12'; Baizhanov 43', 88'; Vasiljević (yellow card) 52'; Ubbink 69'; Skorykh (yellow card) 82'	Summary	S.Sagyndykov (yellow card) 22'; A.Shabaev (yellow card) 74'; Azovskiy 90+1'	Stadium: Shakhter Stadium; Attendance: 1,000; Referee: Aleksandr Aliyev

29 October 2016 10	Zhetysu	0 – 2	Akzhayik	Taldykorgan
15:00 (UTC+6)	Azovskiy (yellow card) 30'; I.Kalinin (yellow card) 35'; I.Amirseitov (yellow card) 45+1'; Beglaryan (red card) 50'; Zhangylyshbay (yellow card) 87'	Summary	E.Abdrakhmanov (yellow card) 25'; Sergienko (yellow card) 26' (goal) 33'; Coronel 58'	Stadium: Zhetysu Stadium; Attendance: 2,000; Referee: Ruslan Duzmambetov

===== League table =====
Pos	Team	Pld	W	D	L	GF	GA	GD	Pts	Relegation
7	Tobol	32	12	5	15	40	40	0	41	
8	Atyrau	32	10	9	13	35	39	−4	39	
9	Shakhter Karagandy	32	10	6	16	25	40	−15	36	
10	Akzhayik	32	11	2	19	27	50	−23	35 (Note: Head-to-head record; Taraz–Akzhayik 0–1, Akzhayik–Taraz 2–1, Akzhayik–Taraz 2–0, Taraz–Akzhayik 2–1.)	
11	Taraz	32	10	5	17	33	42	−9	35	Qualification for the relegation play-offs (Note: Despite finishing 11th and losing the relegation playoffs, Taraz were readmitted because only one team was given a license.)
12	Zhetysu (R)	32	8	7	17	37	53	−16	31	Relegation to the Kazakhstan First Division

Source: Soccerway
Rules for classification: 1) Points; 2) Head-to-head points; 3) Head-to-head matches won; 4) Head-to-head goal difference; 5) Head-to-head goals scored; 6) Head-to-head away goals scored; 7) Goal difference; 8) Matches won; 9) Goals scored; 10) Away goals scored; 11) Draw.
(R) Relegated

=== Kazakhstan Cup ===
27 April 2016 Last 16	Aktobe	0 – 1	Zhetysu	Aktobe
20:00 (UTC+6)	D.Zhalmukan (yellow card) 64'; Smakov (yellow card) 87'	Summary	A.Shabaev (yellow card) 42'; Savić 65'; Simonovski (yellow card) 90'	Stadium: Central Stadium; Attendance: 5,500; Referee: Sergey Gorokhovodatskiy

25 May 2016 Quarterfinal	Zhetysu	0 – 2	Kairat	Taldykorgan
17:30 (UTC+6)	Đalović (yellow card) 82'	Summary	Lunin 4'; Đalović 14' (o.g.)	Stadium: Zhetysu Stadium; Attendance: 3,000; Referee: Viktor Antonov

== Squad statistics ==
As of Match played 29 October 2016

=== Appearances and goals ===
No.	Pos	Nat	Player	Total		Premier League		Kazakhstan Cup	
No.	Pos	Nat	Player	Apps	Goals	Apps	Goals	Apps	Goals
1	GK	(Kazakhstan) KAZ	Andrey Shabanov	19	0	19	0	0	0
2	DF	(Kazakhstan) KAZ	Temirlan Adilkhanov	18	0	12+4	0	2	0
6	MF	(Kazakhstan) KAZ	Michael Harun-Zadeh	6	0	1+4	0	1	0
8	DF	(Kazakhstan) KAZ	Serik Sagyndykov	24	0	16+7	0	1	0
9	FW	(Slovenia) SLO	Dejan Djermanović	12	5	10+2	5	0	0
10	FW	(Kazakhstan) KAZ	Toktar Zhangylyshbay	12	2	3+9	2	0	0
11	MF	(Kazakhstan) KAZ	Vadim Borovskiy	17	3	12+5	3	0	0
12	MF	(Ukraine) UKR	Artem Kasyanov	17	2	15+2	2	0	0
13	DF	(Kazakhstan) KAZ	Ilyas Amirseitov	30	1	27+2	1	1	0
14	FW	(Armenia) ARM	Narek Beglaryan	11	2	8+3	2	0	0
15	MF	(Kazakhstan) KAZ	Ruslan Barzukayev	1	0	0+1	0	0	0
17	DF	(Kazakhstan) KAZ	Dias Mynbayev	9	0	0+7	0	1+1	0
18	DF	(Kazakhstan) KAZ	Maksim Azovskiy	19	1	12+6	1	1	0
19	MF	(Kazakhstan) KAZ	Daniyar Nurzhumaev	1	0	0+1	0	0	0
20	GK	(Kazakhstan) KAZ	Andrey Pasechenko	15	0	13	0	2	0
21	DF	(Kazakhstan) KAZ	Berik Shaikhov	12	0	11+1	0	0	0
22	MF	(Kazakhstan) KAZ	Ilia Kalinin	34	1	21+11	1	2	0
23	MF	(Kazakhstan) KAZ	Adil Balgabaev	2	0	0+2	0	0	0
27	DF	(Kazakhstan) KAZ	Andrey Shabaev	23	0	20+1	0	1+1	0
44	DF	(Czech Republic) CZE	Martin Klein	21	1	19	1	2	0
86	DF	(Serbia) SRB	Marko Đalović	29	2	28	2	1	0
90	DF	(France) FRA	Mamadou Wague	13	0	10+3	0	0	0
97	MF	(Kazakhstan) KAZ	Ramir Khassanov	1	0	0	0	1	0
Players away from Zhetysu on loan:
Players who appeared for Zhetysu that left during the season:
7	MF	(Belarus) BLR	Filip Rudzik	7	0	7	0	0	0
9	MF	(Kazakhstan) KAZ	Bauyrzhan Turysbek	19	2	15+2	2	1+1	0
10	FW	(North Macedonia) MKD	Dušan Savić	21	11	19	10	1+1	1
14	MF	(North Macedonia) MKD	Gjorgji Mojsov	15	1	8+6	1	1	0
24	FW	(North Macedonia) MKD	Marko Simonovski	19	2	12+5	2	1+1	0
57	DF	(Ivory Coast) CIV	Didier Kadio	23	2	21	2	2	0
87	FW	(Ivory Coast) CIV	Boti Goa	5	0	2+3	0	0	0

=== Goal scorers ===
Place	Position	Nation	Number	Name	Premier League	Kazakhstan Cup	Total
1	FW	(North Macedonia)	10	Dušan Savić	10	1	11
2	FW	(Slovenia)	9	Dejan Djermanović	5	0	5
3	MF	(Kazakhstan)	11	Vadim Borovskiy	3	0	3
4	MF	(Kazakhstan)	9	Bauyrzhan Turysbek	2	0	2
4	FW	(North Macedonia)	24	Marko Simonovski	2	0	2
4	DF	(Ivory Coast)	57	Didier Kadio	2	0	2
4	DF	(Serbia)	86	Marko Đalović	2	0	2
4	FW	(Armenia)	14	Narek Beglaryan	2	0	2
4	MF	(Ukraine)	12	Artem Kasyanov	2	0	2
4	FW	(Kazakhstan)	10	Toktar Zhangylyshbay	2	0	2
11	DF	(Czech Republic)	44	Martin Klein	1	0	1
11	MF	(North Macedonia)	14	Gjorgji Mojsov	1	0	1
11	MF	(Kazakhstan)	22	Ilia Kalinin	1	0	1
11	DF	(Kazakhstan)	13	Ilyas Amirseitov	1	0	1
11	DF	(Kazakhstan)	18	Maksim Azovskiy	1	0	1
				TOTALS	34	1	35

=== Disciplinary record ===
Number	Nation	Position	Name	Premier League		Kazakhstan Cup		Total	
Number	Nation	Position	Name	Yellow card	Red card	Yellow card	Red card	Yellow card	Red card
1	(Kazakhstan)	GK	Andrey Shabanov	1	0	0	0	1	0
2	(Belarus)	MF	Temirlan Adilkhanov	3	0	0	0	3	0
7	(Belarus)	MF	Filip Rudzik	2	0	0	0	2	0
8	(Kazakhstan)	MF	Serik Sagyndykov	8	0	0	0	8	0
9	(Kazakhstan)	MF	Bauyrzhan Turysbek	3	0	0	0	3	0
10	(North Macedonia)	FW	Dušan Savić	3	0	0	0	3	0
10	(Kazakhstan)	FW	Toktar Zhangylyshbay	5	1	0	0	5	1
11	(Kazakhstan)	MF	Vadim Borovskiy	4	1	0	0	4	1
12	(Ukraine)	MF	Artem Kasyanov	4	0	0	0	4	0
13	(Kazakhstan)	DF	Ilyas Amirseitov	5	0	0	0	5	0
14	(North Macedonia)	MF	Gjorgji Mojsov	3	0	0	0	3	0
14	(Armenia)	FW	Narek Beglaryan	2	1	0	0	2	1
18	(Kazakhstan)	DF	Maksim Azovskiy	1	0	0	0	1	0
20	(Kazakhstan)	GK	Andrey Pasechenko	1	0	0	0	1	0
22	(Kazakhstan)	MF	Ilia Kalinin	2	0	0	0	2	0
24	(North Macedonia)	FW	Marko Simonovski	3	0	1	0	4	0
27	(Kazakhstan)	DF	Andrey Shabaev	2	0	1	0	3	0
44	(Czech Republic)	DF	Martin Klein	8	0	0	0	8	0
57	(Ivory Coast)	DF	Didier Kadio	4	0	0	0	4	0
79	(Ivory Coast)	FW	Boti Goa	2	0	0	0	2	0
86	(Serbia)	DF	Marko Đalović	3	0	1	0	4	0
90	(France)	DF	Mamadou Wague	2	1	0	0	2	1
			TOTALS	71	4	3	0	74	4
