= List of Kazakhstan football transfers summer 2016 =

This is a list of Kazakh football transfers in the summer transfer window 2016 by club. Only clubs of the 2016 Kazakhstan Premier League are included, with the transfer window closing on 5 July 2016.

== Kazakhstan Premier League 2016 ==
=== Aktobe ===
In: Note: Flags indicate national team as defined under FIFA eligibility rules; some limited exceptions apply. Players may hold more than one non-FIFA nationality.

| No. | Pos. | Nation | Player |
|---|---|---|---|
| 9 | FW | KAZ | Aleksey Shchotkin (from (Kazakhstan) Astana) |
| 33 | MF | SRB | Vuk Mitošević (from (Serbia) Jagodina) |
| 77 | FW | CIV | Lassina Dao (from (Moldova) Zaria Bălți) |
| 85 | FW | RUS | Dmitry Golubov (from (Russia) Dynamo Stavropol) |

Out: Note: Flags indicate national team as defined under FIFA eligibility rules; some limited exceptions apply. Players may hold more than one non-FIFA nationality.

| No. | Pos. | Nation | Player |
|---|---|---|---|
| 8 | DF | KAZ | Samat Smakov (to (Kazakhstan) Ordabasy) |
| 9 | MF | KAZ | Abylaykhan Totay (to (Kazakhstan) Akzhayik) |
| 11 | MF | UZB | Bobir Davlatov (loan return to (Russia) Rubin Kazan) |
| 18 | FW | KAZ | Toktar Zhangylyshbay (to (Kazakhstan) Zhetysu) |
| 19 | FW | KAZ | Sergey Lisenkov |
| 23 | FW | UKR | Ilya Mikhalyov |
| 24 | FW | RUS | Mikhail Petrolay (loan return to (Russia) Rubin Kazan) |
| 33 | FW | KAZ | Rustam Sakhibov |
| 39 | FW | KAZ | Murat Tleshev |

=== Akzhayik ===
In: Note: Flags indicate national team as defined under FIFA eligibility rules; some limited exceptions apply. Players may hold more than one non-FIFA nationality.

| No. | Pos. | Nation | Player |
|---|---|---|---|
| 7 | FW | CHI | Matías Rubio (from (Chile) Rangers de Talca) |
| 11 | MF | KAZ | Rakhimzhan Rozybakiev (from (Kazakhstan) Tobol) |
| 12 | FW | SRB | Miroslav Lečić (from (Serbia) Jagodina) |
| 15 | MF | KAZ | Yevgeniy Levin (loan from (Kazakhstan) Tobol) |
| 20 | MF | KAZ | Abylaykhan Totay (from (Kazakhstan) Aktobe) |
| 29 | DF | NGA | Michael Odibe (from (Romania) Concordia Chiajna) |
| 32 | GK | SRB | Srđan Ostojić (from (Serbia) Zemun) |
| 40 | FW | UKR | Kostyantyn Dudchenko (from (Kazakhstan) Tobol) |
| 44 | MF | KAZ | Marat Shakhmetov (from (Kazakhstan) Taraz) |

Out: Note: Flags indicate national team as defined under FIFA eligibility rules; some limited exceptions apply. Players may hold more than one non-FIFA nationality.

| No. | Pos. | Nation | Player |
|---|---|---|---|
| 7 | MF | KAZ | Izim Sarsekenov |
| 20 | FW | MDA | Oleg Hromțov |

=== Astana ===
In: Note: Flags indicate national team as defined under FIFA eligibility rules; some limited exceptions apply. Players may hold more than one non-FIFA nationality.

| No. | Pos. | Nation | Player |
|---|---|---|---|
| 9 | MF | MKD | Agim Ibraimi (from (Slovenia) Maribor) |
| 13 | MF | KAZ | Azat Nurgaliev (loan from (Kazakhstan) Ordabasy) |
| 14 | DF | BLR | Igor Shitov (from (Russia) Mordovia Saransk) |
| 22 | DF | KAZ | Konstantin Engel (from (Germany) Ingolstadt 04) |
| 25 | DF | KAZ | Serhiy Malyi (from (Kazakhstan) Irtysh Pavlodar) |
| 30 | FW | COD | Junior Kabananga (loan return from (Turkey) Kardemir Karabükspor) |

Out: Note: Flags indicate national team as defined under FIFA eligibility rules; some limited exceptions apply. Players may hold more than one non-FIFA nationality.

| No. | Pos. | Nation | Player |
|---|---|---|---|
| 4 | DF | KAZ | Mark Gorman (to (Kazakhstan) Tobol) |
| 11 | FW | KAZ | Aleksey Shchotkin (to (Kazakhstan) Aktobe) |
| 16 | MF | MKD | Besart Abdurahimi (loan return to (Belgium) Lokeren) |
| 20 | MF | NGA | Lukman Haruna (loan return to (Ukraine) Dynamo Kyiv) |
| 21 | DF | KAZ | Berik Shaikhov (loan to (Kazakhstan) Zhetysu) |
| 44 | DF | RUS | Yevgeny Postnikov |

=== Atyrau ===
In: Note: Flags indicate national team as defined under FIFA eligibility rules; some limited exceptions apply. Players may hold more than one non-FIFA nationality.

| No. | Pos. | Nation | Player |
|---|---|---|---|
| 29 | DF | KAZ | Berik Aitbayev (from (Kazakhstan) Taraz) |
| 96 | MF | KAZ | Maxim Fedin (from (Serbia) Spartak Subotica) |

Out: Note: Flags indicate national team as defined under FIFA eligibility rules; some limited exceptions apply. Players may hold more than one non-FIFA nationality.

| No. | Pos. | Nation | Player |

=== Irtysh ===
In: Note: Flags indicate national team as defined under FIFA eligibility rules; some limited exceptions apply. Players may hold more than one non-FIFA nationality.

| No. | Pos. | Nation | Player |
|---|---|---|---|
| 8 | DF | KAZ | Damir Dautov (from (Cyprus) Ethnikos Achna) |
| 11 | MF | GEO | Shota Grigalashvili (from (Cyprus) Ethnikos Achna) |
| 17 | MF | KAZ | Vitali Li (loan from (Kazakhstan) Kairat) |
| — | FW | GHA | Kwame Karikari (loan from (Norway) Haugesund) |

Out: Note: Flags indicate national team as defined under FIFA eligibility rules; some limited exceptions apply. Players may hold more than one non-FIFA nationality.

| No. | Pos. | Nation | Player |
|---|---|---|---|
| 5 | DF | KAZ | Aleksandr Kislitsyn (to (Kazakhstan) Okzhetpes) |
| 6 | FW | KAZ | Aleksandr Kirov (to (Kazakhstan) Taraz) |
| 7 | MF | GEO | Gogita Gogua (to (Kazakhstan) Ordabasy) |
| 27 | DF | KAZ | Serhiy Malyi (to (Kazakhstan) Astana) |
| 99 | FW | GAM | Ousman Jallow (to (Finland) HJK) |

=== Kairat ===
In: Note: Flags indicate national team as defined under FIFA eligibility rules; some limited exceptions apply. Players may hold more than one non-FIFA nationality.

| No. | Pos. | Nation | Player |
|---|---|---|---|
| 15 | MF | KAZ | Bauyrzhan Turysbek (from (Kazakhstan) Zhetysu) |
| 23 | DF | KAZ | Gafurzhan Suyumbaev (from (Kazakhstan) Ordabasy) |
| 27 | GK | KAZ | Stas Pokatilov (loan from (Russia) Rostov) |
| 30 | MF | CHI | Gerson Acevedo (from (Russia) Ural) |
| — | DF | ESP | César Arzo (from (Greece) AEK Athens) |

Out: Note: Flags indicate national team as defined under FIFA eligibility rules; some limited exceptions apply. Players may hold more than one non-FIFA nationality.

| No. | Pos. | Nation | Player |
|---|---|---|---|
| 5 | MF | SVK | Lukáš Tesák |
| 18 | MF | KAZ | Vitali Li (loan to (Kazakhstan) Irtysh Pavlodar) |

=== Okzhetpes ===
In: Note: Flags indicate national team as defined under FIFA eligibility rules; some limited exceptions apply. Players may hold more than one non-FIFA nationality.

| No. | Pos. | Nation | Player |
|---|---|---|---|
| 4 | DF | KAZ | Aleksandr Kislitsyn (from (Kazakhstan) Irtysh Pavlodar) |
| 32 | FW | CHI | Nicolás Canales (from (Azerbaijan) Neftçi Baku) |

Out: Note: Flags indicate national team as defined under FIFA eligibility rules; some limited exceptions apply. Players may hold more than one non-FIFA nationality.

| No. | Pos. | Nation | Player |
|---|---|---|---|
| 33 | FW | RUS | Aleksandr Alkhazov |

=== Ordabasy ===
In: Note: Flags indicate national team as defined under FIFA eligibility rules; some limited exceptions apply. Players may hold more than one non-FIFA nationality.

| No. | Pos. | Nation | Player |
|---|---|---|---|
| 34 | MF | GEO | Gogita Gogua (from (Kazakhstan) Irtysh Pavlodar) |
| 99 | FW | GEO | Otar Martsvaladze (from (Georgia (country)) Dila Gori) |
| — | DF | KAZ | Samat Smakov (from (Kazakhstan) Aktobe) |

Out: Note: Flags indicate national team as defined under FIFA eligibility rules; some limited exceptions apply. Players may hold more than one non-FIFA nationality.

| No. | Pos. | Nation | Player |
|---|---|---|---|
| 5 | DF | KAZ | Gafurzhan Suyumbaev (to (Kazakhstan) Kairat) |
| 7 | MF | KAZ | Azat Nurgaliev (loan to (Kazakhstan) Astana) |
| 18 | FW | KAZ | Daurenbek Tazhimbetov (to (Kazakhstan) Taraz) |
| 84 | FW | SRB | Miloš Trifunović |
| — | GK | KAZ | Kirill Korotkevich (to (Kazakhstan) Taraz) |

=== Shakhter Karagandy ===
In: Note: Flags indicate national team as defined under FIFA eligibility rules; some limited exceptions apply. Players may hold more than one non-FIFA nationality.

| No. | Pos. | Nation | Player |
|---|---|---|---|
| 3 | DF | BIH | Nikola Vasiljević (from (Bosnia and Herzegovina) Drina Zvornik) |
| 18 | MF | SVK | Štefan Zošák (from (Slovakia) Ružomberok) |
| 24 | FW | MKD | Marko Simonovski (from (Kazakhstan) Zhetysu) |
| 89 | FW | SVK | Filip Serečin (from (Slovakia) Zemplín Michalovce) |

Out: Note: Flags indicate national team as defined under FIFA eligibility rules; some limited exceptions apply. Players may hold more than one non-FIFA nationality.

| No. | Pos. | Nation | Player |
|---|---|---|---|
| 10 | MF | FIN | Erfan Zeneli |
| 24 | DF | UKR | Oleksiy Kurilov (to (Russia) Fakel Voronezh) |
| 97 | MF | FIN | Moshtagh Yaghoubi (loan return to (Latvia) Spartaks Jūrmala) |

=== Taraz ===
In: Note: Flags indicate national team as defined under FIFA eligibility rules; some limited exceptions apply. Players may hold more than one non-FIFA nationality.

| No. | Pos. | Nation | Player |
|---|---|---|---|
| 67 | FW | UKR | Andriy Yakovlyev (from (Ukraine) Zaria Bălți) |
| 70 | GK | KAZ | Kirill Korotkevich (from (Kazakhstan) Ordabasy) |
| 71 | FW | KAZ | Daurenbek Tazhimbetov (from (Kazakhstan) Ordabasy) |
| 75 | FW | UKR | Oleksandr Pyschur (from (Uzbekistan) Navbahor Namangan) |
| 84 | MF | TJK | Davron Ergashev (from (Tajikistan) Istiklol) |
| 85 | DF | RUS | Anton Grigoryev |
| 88 | MF | UKR | Oleksandr Aliyev (from (Ukraine) Katandzaro Kyiv) |
| 99 | FW | KAZ | Aleksandr Kirov (from (Kazakhstan) Irtysh Pavlodar) |

Out: Note: Flags indicate national team as defined under FIFA eligibility rules; some limited exceptions apply. Players may hold more than one non-FIFA nationality.

| No. | Pos. | Nation | Player |
|---|---|---|---|
| 5 | MF | SRB | Jovan Golić |
| 6 | MF | KAZ | Marat Shakhmetov (to (Kazakhstan) Akzhayik) |
| 14 | DF | KAZ | Berik Aitbayev (to (Kazakhstan) Atyrau) |
| 16 | GK | SRB | Dušan Đokić |
| 17 | MF | KAZ | Oleg Nedashkovsky |
| 21 | MF | KAZ | Bakhytzhan Rymtaev |
| 44 | MF | KAZ | Adilet Abdenabi |
| 78 | FW | BLR | Ihar Zyankovich |

=== Tobol ===
In: Note: Flags indicate national team as defined under FIFA eligibility rules; some limited exceptions apply. Players may hold more than one non-FIFA nationality.

| No. | Pos. | Nation | Player |
|---|---|---|---|
| 10 | FW | RUS | Shamil Asildarov (from (Russia) Volgar Astrakhan) |
| 18 | DF | KAZ | Mark Gorman (from (Kazakhstan) Astana) |
| 20 | FW | MKD | Dušan Savić (to (Kazakhstan) Zhetysu) |

Out: Note: Flags indicate national team as defined under FIFA eligibility rules; some limited exceptions apply. Players may hold more than one non-FIFA nationality.

| No. | Pos. | Nation | Player |
|---|---|---|---|
| 6 | MF | KAZ | Rakhimzhan Rozybakiev (to (Kazakhstan) Akzhayik) |
| 14 | MF | KAZ | Yevgeniy Levin (loan to (Kazakhstan) Akzhayik) |
| 25 | MF | FRA | Alassane N'Diaye |
| 40 | FW | UKR | Kostyantyn Dudchenko (to (Kazakhstan) Akzhayik) |

=== Zhetysu ===
In: Note: Flags indicate national team as defined under FIFA eligibility rules; some limited exceptions apply. Players may hold more than one non-FIFA nationality.

| No. | Pos. | Nation | Player |
|---|---|---|---|
| 9 | FW | SVN | Dejan Djermanović (from (Bosnia and Herzegovina) Željezničar Sarajevo) |
| 10 | FW | KAZ | Toktar Zhangylyshbay (from (Kazakhstan) Aktobe) |
| 12 | MF | UKR | Artem Kasyanov (from (Ukraine) Metalist Kharkiv) |
| 14 | FW | ARM | Narek Beglaryan (from (Armenia) Gandzasar Kapan) |
| 21 | DF | KAZ | Berik Shaikhov (loan from (Kazakhstan) Astana) |
| 90 | DF | FRA | Mamadou Wague (from (Sweden) Assyriska) |

Out: Note: Flags indicate national team as defined under FIFA eligibility rules; some limited exceptions apply. Players may hold more than one non-FIFA nationality.

| No. | Pos. | Nation | Player |
|---|---|---|---|
| 7 | MF | BLR | Filip Rudzik |
| 9 | MF | KAZ | Bauyrzhan Turysbek (to (Kazakhstan) Kairat) |
| 10 | FW | MKD | Dušan Savić (to (Kazakhstan) Tobol) |
| 14 | MF | MKD | Gjorgji Mojsov |
| 24 | FW | MKD | Marko Simonovski (to (Kazakhstan) Shakhter Karagandy) |
| 87 | FW | CIV | Boti Goa |
