= 2016 Kazakhstan Premier League =

Kazakhstan Premier League
- Season: 2016
- Champions: Astana (3rd title)
- Relegated: Zhetysu; Taraz
- Champions League: Astana
- Europa League: Kairat; Irtysh Pavlodar; Ordabasy
- Matches: 192
- Goals: 491 (2.56 per match)
- Top goalscorer: Gerard Gohou (22 goals)
- Biggest home win: Kairat 6–0 Okzhetpes (21 May 2016)
- Biggest away win: Shakhter Karagandy 0–5 Kairat (11 June 2016); Akzhayik 0–5 Tobol (24 July 2016)
- Highest scoring: Aktobe 2–6 Kairat (19 June 2016); Aktobe 4–4 Ordabasy (13 August 2016)

The 2016 Kazakhstan Premier League was the 25th season of the Kazakhstan Premier League, the highest football league competition in Kazakhstan. Astana were the defending champions having won their second league championship the previous year, and they successfully defended their title this season. The season began on 12 March 2016 and concluded on 29 October 2016; the relegation play-off took place on 5 November 2016.

== Teams ==
FC Kaisar was relegated at the end of the 2015 season, and was replaced by Akzhayik.

=== Team overview ===
Locations of teams in the 2016 Kazakhstan Premier League

Team	Location	Venue	Capacity
Aktobe	Aktobe	Aktobe Central Stadium	15,000
Akzhayik	Oral	Petr Atoyan Stadium	8,320
Astana	Astana	Astana Arena	30,000
Atyrau	Atyrau	Munaishy Stadium	8,690
Irtysh	Pavlodar	Pavlodar Central Stadium	15,000
Kairat	Almaty	Almaty Central Stadium	25,057
Okzhetpes	Kokshetau	Okzhetpes Stadium	4,158
Ordabasy	Shymkent	Kazhymukan Munaitpasov Stadium	35,000
Shakhter	Karaganda	Shakhter Stadium	20,000
Taraz	Taraz	Taraz Central Stadium	11,525
Tobol	Kostanay	Kostanay Central Stadium	10,500
Zhetysu	Taldykorgan	Zhetysu Stadium	4,000

=== Personnel and kits ===
Note: Flags indicate national team as has been defined under FIFA eligibility rules. Players and Managers may hold more than one non-FIFA nationality.

Team	Manager	Captain	Kit manufacturer	Shirt sponsor
Aktobe	(Russia) Yuri Utkulbayev		Lotto	—
Akzhayik	(Kazakhstan) Artur Avakyants	(Serbia) (Kazakhstan) Predrag Govedarica	Adidas	Expo 2017
Astana	(Bulgaria) Stanimir Stoilov	(Kazakhstan) Tanat Nusserbayev	Adidas	Samruk-Kazyna
Atyrau	(Bulgaria) Stoycho Mladenov	(Kazakhstan) Zhasur Narzikulov	Adidas	—
Irtysh	(Bulgaria) Dimitar Dimitrov	(Kazakhstan) David Loria	Nike	ENRC
Kairat	(Georgia (country)) Kakhaber Tskhadadze	(Kazakhstan) Bauyrzhan Islamkhan	Nike	Expo 2017
Okzhetpes	(Russia) Vladimir Mukhanov	(Kazakhstan) Alibek Buleshev	Adidas	Chempionat
Ordabasy	(Kazakhstan) Bakhtiyar Bayseitov	(Kazakhstan) Azat Nurgaliev	Adidas	TAU
Shakhter	(Russia) Aleksei Yeryomenko	(Kazakhstan) Maksat Baizhanov	Adidas	—
Taraz	(Ukraine) Yuriy Maksymov	(Kazakhstan) Dmitri Yevstigneyev	Adidas	—
Tobol	(Russia) Omari Tetradze	(Kazakhstan) Nurbol Zhumaskaliyev	Adidas	—
Zhetysu	(Kazakhstan) Almas Kulshinbaev	(Kazakhstan) Andrey Pasechenko	Adidas	—

=== Foreign players ===
The number of foreign players is restricted to eight per KPL team. A team can use only five foreign players on the field in each game.

Club	Player 1	Player 2	Player 3	Player 4	Player 5	Player 6	Player 7	Player 8
Aktobe	(Ivory Coast) Lassina Dao	(Ivory Coast) Kouassi Kouadja	(Russia) Nikita Bocharov	(Russia) Dmitry Golubov	(Russia) Marat Sitdikov	(Russia) Sandro Tsveiba	(Serbia) Vuk Mitošević	(Ukraine) Ilya Mikhalyov
Akzhayik	(Bosnia and Herzegovina) Saša Kolunija	(Chile) Matías Rubio	(Nigeria) Michael Odibe	(Paraguay) Freddy Coronel	(Serbia) Miroslav Lečić	(Serbia) Danilo Nikolić	(Serbia) Srđan Ostojić	(Serbia) Predrag Govedarica
Astana	(Belarus) **Igor Shitov**	(Bosnia and Herzegovina) **Marin Aničić**	(Colombia) Roger Cañas	(Democratic Republic of the Congo) **Junior Kabananga**	(Ghana) Patrick Twumasi	(North Macedonia) **Agim Ibraimi**	(Serbia) Đorđe Despotović	(Serbia) **Nemanja Maksimović**
Atyrau	(Belarus) **Aleksandr Makas**	(Cameroon) **Guy Essame**	(Cameroon) Abdel Lamanje	(North Macedonia) **Aleksandar Damčevski**	(Poland) Przemysław Trytko	(Romania) Alexandru Curtean	(Ukraine) Volodymyr Arzhanov	(Ukraine) Vyacheslav Sharpar
Irtysh	(Bosnia and Herzegovina) **Semir Kerla**	(Chile) Ignacio Herrera	(Czech Republic) Tomáš Jirsák	(The Gambia) **Ousman Jallow**	(Lithuania) Georgas Freidgeimas	(Portugal) Carlos Fonseca	(Senegal) Djiby Fall	
Kairat	(Brazil) Isael	(Cameroon) Léandre Tawamba	(Chile) **Gerson Acevedo**	(Ivory Coast) Gerard Gohou	(Russia) **Andrey Arshavin**	(Serbia) Žarko Marković	(Spain) César Arzo	(Ukraine) **Anatoliy Tymoshchuk**
Okzhetpes	(Cameroon) Joseph Nane	(Cameroon) Serge Bando N'Ganbe	(Chile) **Nicolás Canales**	(Russia) Daniil Chertov	(Russia) Vitali Volkov	(Serbia) Risto Ristović	(Serbia) Saša Stamenković	(Ukraine) Oleksandr Chyzhov
Ordabasy	(Croatia) Edin Junuzović	(Georgia (country)) **Gogita Gogua**	(Montenegro) **Filip Kasalica**	(Nigeria) Dominic Chatto	(Senegal) Abdoulaye Diakate	(Serbia) Aleksandar Simčević	(Serbia) **Branislav Trajković**	(Uzbekistan) **Alexander Geynrikh**
Shakhter	(Armenia) **Robert Arzumanyan**	(Belarus) Ivan Sadownichy	(Bosnia and Herzegovina) Nikola Vasiljević	(North Macedonia) **Marko Simonovski**	(Netherlands) Desley Ubbink	(Slovakia) Filip Serečin	(Slovakia) Július Szöke	(Slovakia) Štefan Zošák
Taraz	(Romania) Ioan Mera	(Russia) Anton Grigoryev	(Senegal) **Malick Mané**	(Tajikistan) **Davron Ergashev**	(Ukraine) **Oleksandr Aliyev**	(Ukraine) Oleksandr Pyschur	(Ukraine) Andriy Yakovlyev	
Tobol	(Austria) Tomáš Šimkovič	(Central African Republic) **Fernander Kassaï**	(Croatia) Denis Glavina	(Lithuania) **Artūras Žulpa**	(North Macedonia) **Dušan Savić**	(Romania) **Ciprian Deac**	(Russia) Shamil Asildarov	(Ukraine) Serhiy Yavorskyi
Zhetysu	(Armenia) Narek Beglaryan	(Czech Republic) **Martin Klein**	(France) Mamadou Wague	(Serbia) Marko Đalović	(Slovenia) Dejan Djermanović	(Ukraine) Artem Kasyanov		

In bold: Players that have been capped for their national team.

=== Managerial changes ===
Team	Outgoing manager	Manner of departure	Date of vacancy	Position in table	Incoming manager	Date of appointment
Aktobe	(Romania) Ioan Andone	Mutual consent	10 November 2015	Pre-season	(Russia) Yuri Utkulbayev	22 December 2015
Taraz	(Ukraine) Evgeny Yarovenko	Mutual consent	11 November 2015	Pre-season	(Kazakhstan) Nurmat Mirzabayev	
Kairat	(Slovakia) Vladimír Weiss	Mutual consent	30 November 2015	Pre-season	(Russia) Aleksandr Borodyuk	28 December 2015
Shakhter	(Ukraine) Ihor Zakhariak			Pre-season	(Slovakia) Jozef Vukušič	8 January 2016
Tobol	(Kazakhstan) Sergey Maslenov			Pre-season	(Kazakhstan) Dmitriy Ogai	23 December 2015
Zhetysu	(Kazakhstan) Ivan Azovskiy			Pre-season	(Kazakhstan) Almas Kulshinbaev	5 January 2016
Kairat	(Russia) Aleksandr Borodyuk	Resigned	5 April 2016	9th	(Georgia (country)) Kakhaber Tskhadadze	7 April 2016
Tobol	(Kazakhstan) Dmitriy Ogai	Mutual consent	28 April 2016	5th		
Taraz	(Kazakhstan) Nurmat Mirzabayev		15 May 2016	12th	(Ukraine) Yuriy Maksymov	15 May 2016
Shakhter Karagandy	(Slovakia) Jozef Vukušič	Resigned	3 August 2016	11th	(Russia) Aleksei Yeryomenko	4 August 2016

== Regular season ==
In the regular season twelve teams played each other home-and-away in a round-robin format for a total of 22 matches per team. The top six teams advanced to the Championship round and the bottom six teams qualified for the Relegation round.

=== Regular season table ===
Pos	Team	Pld	W	D	L	GF	GA	GD	Pts	Qualification
1	Astana	22	17	2	3	34	14	+20	53	Qualification for the championship round
2	Kairat	22	14	4	4	50	22	+28	46	Qualification for the championship round
3	Irtysh Pavlodar	22	12	5	5	37	18	+19	41	Qualification for the championship round
4	Okzhetpes	22	11	4	7	33	23	+10	37	Qualification for the championship round
5	Ordabasy	22	9	6	7	26	27	−1	33	Qualification for the championship round
6	Aktobe	22	7	7	8	23	32	−9	28 (Note: Head-to-head record: Aktobe (7 points), Atyrau (5 points), Tobol (4 points).)	Qualification for the championship round
7	Atyrau	22	7	7	8	21	23	−2	28	Qualification for the relegation round
8	Tobol	22	8	4	10	28	26	+2	28	Qualification for the relegation round
9	Zhetysu	22	6	5	11	22	32	−10	23	Qualification for the relegation round
10	Shakhter Karagandy	22	5	6	11	10	27	−17	21	Qualification for the relegation round
11	Taraz	22	5	4	13	22	30	−8	19	Qualification for the relegation round
12	Akzhayik	22	3	2	17	12	44	−32	11	Qualification for the relegation round

Source: UEFA.com, Soccerway
Rules for classification: 1) Points; 2) Head-to-head points; 3) Head-to-head matches won; 4) Head-to-head goal difference; 5) Head-to-head goals scored; 6) Head-to-head away goals scored; 7) Goal difference; 8) Matches won; 9) Goals scored; 10) Away goals scored; 11) Draw.

=== Regular season results ===
Home \ Away	AKT	AKZ	AST	ATY	IRT	KRT	OKZ	ORD	SHA	TAR	TOB	ZHE
Aktobe		1–0	0–1	1–0	1–1	2–6	1–0	0–0	2–0	2–2	0–1	3–2
Akzhayik	0–0		1–5	0–4	0–3	2–1	0–2	0–1	0–1	2–1	0–5	1–2
Astana	1–0	2–0		2–1	1–1	1–0	1–0	3–1	2–1	2–1	1–0	1–0
Atyrau	1–1	2–0	1–0		0–1	0–1	2–1	2–2	0–0	1–0	0–0	1–0
Irtysh Pavlodar	4–1	0–0	2–2	3–0		2–3	1–0	2–0	0–0	2–1	3–1	3–1
Kairat	3–0	3–2	1–0	5–2	1–0		6–0	2–2	0–0	3–1	3–2	2–0
Okzhetpes	4–1	4–2	0–1	2–0	0–2	1–1		2–0	3–0	0–0	1–1	2–0
Ordabasy	3–1	1–0	1–3	2–1	2–0	1–0	2–2		2–0	0–3	2–2	0–1
Shakhter Karagandy	0–2	3–1	2–0	0–0	0–2	0–5	0–1	0–0		0–1	1–0	0–0
Taraz	1–1	0–1	0–2	0–0	1–0	2–1	1–3	1–2	1–2		2–0	2–3
Tobol	1–2	1–0	1–2	1–2	3–2	1–2	0–1	1–0	3–0	1–0		2–2
Zhetysu	1–1	2–0	0–1	1–1	0–3	1–1	1–4	1–2	2–0	2–1	0–1	

Source: Soccerway
Legend: Blue = home team win; Yellow = draw; Red = away team win.

== Championship round ==
The top six teams from the regular season will participate in the Championship round where they will play each other home-and-away in a round-robin format for a total of 10 matches per team. In contrast to the previous season, teams will carry forward their entire regular season record, with no halving of points. After completion of the Championship round the winners will be the Champions of 2016 Kazakhstan Premier League and qualify for 2017–18 UEFA Champions League second qualifying round. The runners-up and third-placed team will qualify for Europa League first qualifying round and the fourth-placed team will also qualify for Europa League because one of the top three teams will win the 2016 Kazakhstan Cup.

=== Championship round table ===
Pos	Team	Pld	W	D	L	GF	GA	GD	Pts	Qualification
1	Astana (C)	32	23	4	5	47	21	+26	73	Qualification for the Champions League second qualifying round (Note: Astana qualified for the Europa League first qualifying round by winning the 2016 Kazakhstan Cup. However, since they already qualified for European competition based on their league position, the spot awarded to the cup winners was passed down the league.)
2	Kairat	32	22	5	5	75	30	+45	71	Qualification for the Europa League first qualifying round
3	Irtysh Pavlodar	32	14	7	11	52	36	+16	49	Qualification for the Europa League first qualifying round
4	Ordabasy	32	13	9	10	41	44	−3	48	Qualification for the Europa League first qualifying round
5	Okzhetpes	32	13	6	13	42	44	−2	45	
6	Aktobe	32	9	9	14	37	52	−15	36	

Source: Soccerway
Rules for classification: 1) Points; 2) Play-off (only if deciding champion when two teams are tied); 3) Head-to-head points; 4) Head-to-head matches won; 5) Head-to-head goal difference; 6) Head-to-head goals scored; 7) Head-to-head away goals scored; 8) Goal difference; 9) Matches won; 10) Goals scored; 11) Away goals scored; 12) Draw.
(C) Champions

=== Championship round results ===
Home \ Away	AKT	AST	IRT	KRT	OKZ	ORD
Aktobe		1–2	1–0	0–1	2–2	4–4
Astana	1–0		3–0	1–4	3–0	2–0
Irtysh Pavlodar	5–1	0–0		1–3	0–2	1–2
Kairat	3–1	2–0	2–1		5–0	1–1
Okzhetpes	0–3	0–0	1–4	1–3		3–0
Ordabasy	2–1	0–1	3–3	2–1	1–0	

Source: Soccerway
Legend: Blue = home team win; Yellow = draw; Red = away team win.

== Relegation round ==
The worst six teams from the regular season participated in the Relegation round where they played each other home-and-away in a round-robin format for a total of 10 matches per team. In contrast to the previous season, teams carried forward their entire regular season record, with no halving of points. After completion of the Relegation round the winners are considered the 7th-placed team of 2016 Kazakhstan Premier League, the runners-up being 8th and so on, with the last team being 12th. The 11th-placed team, Taraz, qualified for the relegation play-off against Altai Semey, the runners-up of 2016 Kazakhstan First Division, with the losing team being eliminated, and the 12th-placed team, Zhetysu, will be directly relegated to 2017 Kazakhstan First Division as the last-placed team.

=== Relegation round table ===
Pos	Team	Pld	W	D	L	GF	GA	GD	Pts	Relegation
7	Tobol	32	12	5	15	40	40	0	41	
8	Atyrau	32	10	9	13	35	39	−4	39	
9	Shakhter Karagandy	32	10	6	16	25	40	−15	36	
10	Akzhayik	32	11	2	19	27	50	−23	35 (Note: Head-to-head record; Taraz–Akzhayik 0–1, Akzhayik–Taraz 2–1, Akzhayik–Taraz 2–0, Taraz–Akzhayik 2–1.)	
11	Taraz	32	10	5	17	33	42	−9	35	Qualification for the relegation play-offs (Note: Despite finishing 11th and losing the relegation playoffs, Taraz were readmitted because only one team was given a license.)
12	Zhetysu (R)	32	8	7	17	37	53	−16	31	Relegation to the Kazakhstan First Division

Source: Soccerway
Rules for classification: 1) Points; 2) Head-to-head points; 3) Head-to-head matches won; 4) Head-to-head goal difference; 5) Head-to-head goals scored; 6) Head-to-head away goals scored; 7) Goal difference; 8) Matches won; 9) Goals scored; 10) Away goals scored; 11) Draw.
(R) Relegated

=== Relegation round results ===
Home \ Away	AKZ	ATY	SHA	TAR	TOB	ZHE
Akzhayik		3–1	1–2	2–0	1–0	1–0
Atyrau	1–2		2–0	1–0	3–0	3–3
Shakhter Karagandy	0–1	3–0		1–0	2–3	4–1
Taraz	2–1	1–0	2–1		2–1	3–2
Tobol	0–1	0–0	2–0	3–1		3–2
Zhetysu	0–2	4–3	1–2	0–0	2–0	

Source: Soccerway
Legend: Blue = home team win; Yellow = draw; Red = away team win.

== Relegation play-offs ==
5 November 2016	Taraz	0–3	Altai Semey	Astana
14:00 (UTC+6)		Report	Shakin 4'; Shaff 45' (pen.); Nurgaliyev 51'	Stadium: Astana Arena; Attendance: 2,500; Referee: Artyom Kuchin

Altai Semey are promoted to the 2017 Kazakhstan Premier League; Taraz are relegated to the 2017 Kazakhstan First Division.

== Statistics ==
=== Top scorers ===
As of matches played 29 October 2016

Rank	Player	Club	Goals
1	(Ivory Coast) Gerard Gohou	Kairat	22
2	(Kazakhstan) Roman Murtazayev	Irtysh Pavlodar	18
3	(Kazakhstan) Bauyrzhan Islamkhan	Kairat	17
4	(Senegal) Malick Mané	Taraz	13
5	(North Macedonia) Dušan Savić	Zhetysu	12
5	(Kazakhstan) Azat Nurgaliev	Ordabasy/Astana	12
7	(Kazakhstan) Sergei Khizhnichenko	Tobol	10
7	(Uzbekistan) Alexander Geynrikh	Ordabasy	10
9	(Cameroon) Serge Bando N'Ganbe	Okzhetpes	9
10	(Kazakhstan) Marat Khairullin	Okzhetpes	8
10	(Serbia) Đorđe Despotović	Astana	8
10	(Russia) Andrey Arshavin	Kairat	8
10	(Ukraine) Volodymyr Arzhanov	Atyrau	8
10	(Austria) Tomáš Šimkovič	Tobol	8
10	(Paraguay) Freddy Coronel	Akzhayik	8

=== Hat-tricks ===
Player	For	Against	Result	Date	Ref.
(North Macedonia) Dušan Savić	Zhetysu	Taraz	3–2	15 June 2016	
(Uzbekistan) Alexander Geynrikh	Ordabasy	Aktobe	4–4	13 August 2016	
(Senegal) Malick Mané	Taraz	Zhetysu	3–2	10 September 2016	

=== Scoring ===
- First goal of the season: Ulan Konysbayev for Atyrau against Zhetysu (12 March 2016)
- Fastest goal of the season: 1st minute,
  - Raul Jalilov for Tobol against Zhetysu (23 April 2016)
- Latest goal of the season: 90+4th minute,
  - Alassane N'Diaye for Tobol against Taraz (1 May 2016)
  - Marat Khairullin for Okzhetpes against Zhetysu (10 May 2016)

== Awards ==
=== Annual awards ===
Award	Winner	Club
Premier League Player of the Year	(Kazakhstan) Bauyrzhan Islamkhan	Kairat
Premier League Young Player of the Year	(Kazakhstan) Yerkebulan Tungyshbayev	Ordabasy
Premier League Manager of the Year	(Bulgaria) Stanimir Stoilov	Astana

=== Team of the Year ===
The Kazakhstan Premier League Team of the Year is a symbolic selection of the league's best-performing players for the season, based on votes from the league's club officials, coaches and captains.

Goalkeepers	Defenders	Midfielders	Forwards
(Kazakhstan) Nenad Erić (Kazakhstan) Vladimir Plotnikov	(Kazakhstan) Dmitry Shomko (Kazakhstan) Gafurzhan Suyumbayev (Kazakhstan) Yuri Logvinenko (Kazakhstan) Sergey Maliy (Bosnia and Herzegovina) Marin Aničić (Serbia) Žarko Marković (Kazakhstan) Yeldos Akhmetov (Kazakhstan) Abzal Beysebekov	(Russia) Andrey Arshavin (Kazakhstan) Serikzhan Muzhikov (Colombia) Roger Cañas (Ukraine) Anatoliy Tymoshchuk (Kazakhstan) Bauyrzhan Islamkhan (Serbia) Nemanja Maksimović (Brazil) Isael (Kazakhstan) Azat Nurgaliyev	(Ivory Coast) Gerard Gohou (Kazakhstan) Sergey Khizhnichenko (Kazakhstan) Roman Murtazayev (Democratic Republic of the Congo) Junior Kabananga

== Attendances ==
#	Club	Average
1	Kairat	10,319
2	Irtysh	5,388
3	Aktobe	5,334
4	Ordabasy	4,563
5	Astana	4,266
6	Taraz	3,319
7	Tobol	2,856
8	Atyrau	2,781
9	Akzhaiyk	2,281
10	Shakhter	2,063
11	Okzhetpes	1,991
12	Zhetysu	1,631
