= 2016 Kazakhstan Cup =

Tournament details
- Country: Kazakhstan
- Teams: 21

Final positions
- Champions: Astana
- Runners-up: Kairat

Tournament statistics
- Matches played: 26
- Goals scored: 59 (2.27 per match)
- Attendance: 52,500 (2,019 per match)
- Top goal scorer(s): Boško Stupić (3); Đorđe Despotović (3); Junior Kabananga (3)

The 2016 Kazakhstan Cup was the 25th season of the Kazakhstan Cup, the annual nationwide football cup competition of Kazakhstan since the independence of the country. The competition began on 21 March 2016 and end with the final on 19 November 2016. Astana defeated defending champions Kairat 1–0 in the final to win their first Kazakhstan Cup since 2012.

Ordabasy qualified for the first qualifying round of the 2017–18 UEFA Europa League after finishing 4th in the league, as both Astana and Kairat had already secured European football for the following season.

== Participating clubs ==
The following 25 teams qualified for the competition:

Premier League all clubs of season 2016	First Division; Nine clubs of season 2016
Aktobe; Akzhayik; Astana; Atyrau; Taraz; Irtysh Pavlodar; Kairat; Okzhetpes; Ordabasy; Shakhter Karagandy; Tobol; Zhetysu	Kyzylzhar; Bolat; Baikonur; Caspiy Aktau; Altai Semey; Ekibastuz; Kaisar; Kyran Shymkent; Maktaaral Atakent

=== Schedule ===
The rounds of the 2016 competition are scheduled as follows:

- Group Stages: 21–28 March 2016
- Last 16:
- Quarterfinal:
- Semifinal:
- Final:

== Group stages ==
=== Group A ===
Pos	Team	Pld	W	D	L	GF	GA	GD	Pts	Qualification
1	Kyzylzhar	2	2	0	0	5	1	+4	6	Advanced to Last 16
2	Bolat	2	0	1	1	2	3	−1	1	
3	Baikonur	2	0	1	1	1	4	−3	1	

Updated to match(es) played on 27 March 2016. Source: PFLK

21 March 2016	Kyzylzhar	3 – 0	Baikonur	Petropavl
16:00 (UTC+6)	Stupić 11'; T.Baizhanov 71'; Averchenko 85'	Summary	z.Pahaev (yellow card) 44'; M.Tolegenulı (yellow card) 50'	Stadium: Karasai Stadium; Attendance: 100; Referee: Omarov

24 March 2016	Bolat	1 – 2	Kyzylzhar	Temirtau
16:00 (UTC+6)	A.Zholshorin (yellow card) 22'; A.Fedorov 27'; H.Mataev (red card) 50'	Summary	Stupić 5'; A.Burtsev 31'; Hichri (yellow card) 57'; A.Sokolenko (yellow card) 90+3'	Stadium: Metallurg Stadium; Attendance: 100; Referee: Atazhanov

27 March 2016	Baikonur	1 – 1	Bolat	Kyzylorda
15:00 (UTC+6)	E.Rustemov 14'	Summary	K.Bernatsky 86'	Stadium: Gani Muratbayev Stadium; Attendance: 100; Referee: Abzhan

=== Group B ===
Pos	Team	Pld	W	D	L	GF	GA	GD	Pts	Qualification
1	Altai Semey	2	1	0	1	2	1	+1	3	Advanced to Last 16
2	Caspiy	2	1	0	1	2	2	0	3	Advanced to Last 16
3	Ekibastuz	2	1	0	1	2	3	−1	3	

Updated to match(es) played on 28 March 2016. Source: PFLK

22 March 2016	Caspiy	1 – 2	Ekibastuz	Aktau
16:00 (UTC+6)	A.Iskendirov (yellow card) 47'; A.Uzganov 70'	Summary	R.Kuanyshev 11', 16'; A.Bralin (yellow card) 67'	Stadium: Zhastar Stadium; Attendance: 300; Referee: Zhantuganov Akhmetov

25 March 2016	Altai Semey	0 – 1	Caspiy	Semey
16:00 (UTC+6)	Karpovich (yellow card) 36'; K.Zarechny (yellow card) 79'	Summary	S.Shalekenov 33'	Stadium: Spartak Stadium; Attendance: 300; Referee: Sahi

28 March 2016	Ekibastuz	0 – 2	Altai Semey	Ekibastuz
15:00 (UTC+6)	B.Omarov (yellow card) 11'; A.Bralin (yellow card) 31'; V. Pavlenko (yellow card) 51'	Summary	Kolodin 36', 65'; Y. Nurgaliyev (yellow card) 37'; A.Shakin (red card) 88'	Stadium: Shakhter Stadium; Attendance: 100; Referee: Atazhanov

=== Group C ===
Pos	Team	Pld	W	D	L	GF	GA	GD	Pts	Qualification
1	Kaisar	2	1	1	0	2	0	+2	4	Advanced to Last 16
2	Makhtaaral	2	0	2	0	1	1	0	2	
3	Kyran	2	0	1	1	1	3	−2	1	

Updated to match(es) played on 29 March 2016. Source: PFLK

23 March 2016	Kyran	1 – 1	Makhtaaral	Shymkent
15:00 (UTC+6)	E.Nokhrin 3' (yellow card) 36'; E.Nabyev (yellow card) 37'; A.Mynbaev (yellow card) 56' (yellow-red card) 74'; S.Shamshi (yellow card) 63'	Summary	A.Tajmagambetov (yellow card) 29'; D.Majitov (yellow card) 36'; S.Ibraev 85'	Stadium: Lokomotive Stadium; Attendance: 500; Referee: Omarov

26 March 2016	Kaisar	2 – 0	Kyran	Kyzylorda
16:00 (UTC+6)	E.Altynbekov; R.Pavinich	Summary		Stadium: Gani Muratbayev Stadium

29 March 2016	Makhtaaral	0 – 0	Kaisar	Shymkent
15:00 (UTC+6)	A.Abutov (yellow card) 24'; S.Ibraev (yellow card) 81'; B.Alipbekov (yellow card) 90+2'; G.Allashukurov (yellow card) 90+4'	Summary	Marochkin (yellow card) 6'; O.Kerimzhanov (yellow card) 23'; I.Nazarov (yellow card) 43'; Narzildaev (yellow card) 81'; U.Zhaksybaev (yellow card) 90+2'	Stadium: Kazhymukan Munaitpasov Stadium; Attendance: 300; Referee: Timur Kumash

== Last 16 ==
26 April 2016	Astana	1 – 0	Caspiy	Astana
16:00 (UTC+6)	B.Kulbekov (yellow card) 13'; Nusserbayev 90'	Summary	R.Zhanysbayev (yellow card) 50'; A.Kyzyltaev (yellow card) 53'	Stadium: Astana Arena; Attendance: 500; Referee: Ruslan Omarov

27 April 2016	Atyrau	1 – 0	Altai Semey	Atyrau
16:00 (UTC+6)	Damčevski 90+3'	Summary		Stadium: Munaishy Stadium; Attendance: 3,000; Referee: Timur Kumashev

27 April 2016	Ordabasy	2 – 0	Kaisar	Shymkent
16:00 (UTC+6)	Irismetov (yellow card) 49'; Junuzović (yellow card) 78'; Tazhimbetov 82' (yellow card) 82'; E.Tungyshbaev 90+2'	Summary	E.Altynbekov (yellow card) 45+1'; D.Suyunov (yellow card) 61'	Stadium: Kazhymukan Munaitpasov Stadium; Attendance: 4,000; Referee: Denis Tevyashov

27 April 2016	Tobol	0 – 0 (2 – 4 p)	Kyzylzhar	Kostanay
17:00 (UTC+6)		Summary		Stadium: Stadion Zatobolets; Attendance: 1,800; Referee: Bolat Saryev

27 April 2016	Akzhayik	0 – 1	Irtysh Pavlodar	Oral
18:00 (UTC+6)		Summary	Herrera 8'	Stadium: Petr Atoyan Stadium; Attendance: 1,500; Referee: Bagdat Abdullaev

27 April 2016	Kairat	4 – 0	Shakhter Karagandy	Almaty
19:30 (UTC+6)	Tawamba 77'; Kuat 83'; Isael 90+2'; A.Darabayev 90+3'	Summary		Stadium: Central Stadium; Attendance: 8,700; Referee: Daniyar Sakhi

27 April 2016	Aktobe	0 – 1	Zhetysu	Aktobe
20:00 (UTC+6)		Summary	Savić 65'	Stadium: Central Stadium; Attendance: 5,500; Referee: Sergey Gorokhovodatskiy

27 April 2016	Okzhetpes	2 – 1	Taraz	Astana
20:00 (UTC+6)	Khairullin 45', 90'; Chichulin (red card) 79'	Summary	A.Suley 75'	Stadium: Astana Arena; Attendance: 1,000; Referee: Furkat Atajanow

== Quarterfinal ==
25 May 2016	Zhetysu	0 – 2	Kairat	Taldykorgan
17:30 (UTC+6)	Đalović (yellow card) 82'	Summary	Lunin 4'; Đalović 14' (o.g.)	Stadium: Zhetysu Stadium; Attendance: 3,000; Referee: Viktor Antonov

25 May 2016	Kyzylzhar	2 – 3	Astana	Petropavl
18:00 (UTC+6)	A.Burtsev 69'; Stupić 80'; Hichri (yellow card) 90'	Summary	Despotović 33', 65'; Shaikhov (yellow card) 63'; A.Tagybergen 73'	Stadium: Avangard Stadium; Attendance: 9,000; Referee: Bolat Karlibayev

25 May 2016	Atyrau	1 – 1 (a.e.t.) (4 – 1 p)	Ordabasy	Atyrau
19:00 (UTC+6)	Arzhanov 71'; Baltayev (yellow card) 80'; Essame (yellow card) 112'	Summary	Abdulin (yellow card) 72' (goal) 90'; Mukhtarov (yellow card) 112'; Irismetov (yellow card) 120'	Stadium: Munaishy Stadium; Attendance: 5,500; Referee: Artyom Kuchin

25 May 2016	Okzhetpes	1 – 2	Irtysh Pavlodar	Astana
19:00 (UTC+6)	Ristović (yellow card) 27'; Zhumakhanov (yellow card) 45'; Chertov 49' (yellow card) 86'	Summary	Akhmetov (yellow card) 69'; Fonseca 41' (yellow card) 90+3'; Fall 73'; Tsirin (yellow card) 90'	Stadium: Astana Arena; Attendance: 1,000; Referee: Sergey Gorokhovodatskiy

== Semifinals ==
The four winners from the quarterfinals were drawn into two two-legged ties.

21 September 2016	Kairat	1 – 0	Atyrau	Almaty
19:30 (UTC+6)	Kuat 72'; Marković (yellow card) 78'	Summary	Saparov (yellow card) 44'	Stadium: Central Stadium; Attendance: 7,000; Referee: Bolat Karlibayev

5 November 2016	Atyrau	0 – 3 (0 – 4 agg.)	Kairat	Atyrau
15:00 (UTC+6)	Curtean (yellow card) 23'; Muldarov (yellow card) 40'; Essame (yellow card) 73'; Nurmukhametov (yellow card) 90+1'	Summary	Suyumbayev 2'; Arshavin 65'; Bakayev (yellow card) 84'; Turysbek (yellow card) 85' (yellow-red card) 88'; Acevedo 90+2'	Stadium: Munaishy Stadium; Attendance: 4,000; Referee: Igor Aleshin

21 September 2016	Irtysh Pavlodar	1 – 2	Astana	Pavlodar
19:00 (UTC+6)	Murtazayev 33'	Summary	Tagybergen 23'; Nusserbayev 37' (yellow card) 71'; Nurgaliyev (yellow card) 89'; Zaynetdinov (yellow card) 90+3'	Stadium: Central Stadium; Attendance: 5,500; Referee: Igor Chesnokov

6 November 2016	Astana	5 – 3 (7 – 4 agg.)	Irtysh Pavlodar	Astana
15:00 (UTC+6)	Despotović 19'; A.Aliyev (yellow card) 27'; Kabananga 35', 62'; B.Kulbekov (yellow card) 70'; Malyi 84'; Cañas 90+2'	Summary	A.Smailov 37', 48'; Fonseca 45'; R.Bogdanov (yellow card) 57'; M.Ramazanov (yellow card) 83'	Stadium: Astana Arena; Attendance: 2,200; Referee: Denis Izmailov

== Final ==
19 November 2016
15:00 (UTC+6)

Kairat	0 – 1	Astana
Marković (yellow card) 90+5'	Summary	Kabananga 47'

Central Stadium, Almaty
Referee: Ruslan Duzmambetov

== Scorers ==
3 goals:

- (Democratic Republic of the Congo) Junior Kabananga, Astana
- (Serbia) Đorđe Despotović, Astana
- (Bosnia and Herzegovina) Boško Stupić, Kyzylzhar

2 goals:

- (Russia) Denis Kolodin, Altai Semey
- (Kazakhstan) Tanat Nusserbayev, Astana
- (Kazakhstan) Askhat Tagybergen, Astana
- (Kazakhstan) Rustem Kuanyshev, Ekibastuz
- (Kazakhstan) Arman Smailov, Irtysh Pavlodar
- (Portugal) Carlos Fonseca, Irtysh Pavlodar
- (Kazakhstan) Islambek Kuat, Kairat
- (Kazakhstan) Andrey Burtsev, Kyzylzhar
- (Kazakhstan) Marat Khairullin, Okzhetpes

1 goals:

- (Colombia) Roger Cañas, Astana
- (Kazakhstan) Serhiy Malyi, Astana
- (North Macedonia) Aleksandar Damčevski, Atyrau
- (Ukraine) Volodymyr Arzhanov, Atyrau
- (Kazakhstan) Erbolat Rustemov, Baikonur
- (Kazakhstan) Alexander Fedorov, Bolat
- (Kazakhstan) Konstantin Bernatskiy, Bolat
- (Kazakhstan) Aset Uzganov, Caspiy
- (Kazakhstan) Sanat Shalekenov, Caspiy
- (Chile) Ignacio Herrera, Irtysh Pavlodar
- (Senegal) Baye Djiby Fall, Irtysh Pavlodar
- (Kazakhstan) Roman Murtazayev, Irtysh Pavlodar
- (Brazil) Isael, Kairat
- (Cameroon) Léandre Tawamba, Kairat
- (Chile) Gerson Acevedo, Kairat
- (Kazakhstan) Aslan Darabayev, Kairat
- (Kazakhstan) Stanislav Lunin, Kairat
- (Kazakhstan) Gafurzhan Suyumbayev, Kairat
- (Russia) Andrey Arshavin, Kairat
- (Kazakhstan) Elzhas Altynbekov, Kaisar
- (Kazakhstan) Roman Pavinich, Kaisar
- (Kazakhstan) Eugene Nokhrin, Kyran
- (Kazakhstan) Timur Baizhanov, Kyzylzhar
- (Kazakhstan) Evgeniy Averchenko, Kyzylzhar
- (Kazakhstan) Sabyrhan Ibraev, Makhtaaral
- (Kazakhstan) Rinat Abdulin, Ordabasy
- (Kazakhstan) Daurenbek Tazhimbetov, Ordabasy
- (Kazakhstan) Erkebulan Tungyshbaev, Ordabasy
- (Russia) Daniil Chertov, Okzhetpes
- (Kazakhstan) Alisher Suley, Taraz
- (North Macedonia) Dušan Savić, Zhetysu

Own goal

- (Serbia) Marko Đalović (25 May 2016 vs Kairat)
