= Toktar Zhangylyshbay =

Kazakhstani footballer

Personal information
- Full name: Toktar Sabituly Zhangylyshbay
- Date of birth: 25 May 1993 (age 33)
- Place of birth: Karagandy, Kazakhstan
- Height: 1.89 m (6 ft 2 in)
- Position: Forward

Team information
- Current team: Okzhetpes
- Number: 11

Youth career
- Shakhter Karagandy

Senior career*
Years	Team	Apps	(Gls)
2011–2015	Shakhter Karagandy	32	(4)
2015	Astana	5	(0)
2015	→ Kairat (loan)	2	(0)
2016	Aktobe	12	(2)
2016	Zhetysu	12	(2)
2017–2018	Tobol	10	(1)
2017–2018	→ Kaisar (loan)	27	(4)
2019–2021	Ordabasy	45	(9)
2022–2023	Shakhter Karagandy	21	(1)
2023	Maktaaral	24	(4)
2024	Kaisar	17	(1)
2025	Kyzylzhar	16	(3)
2026–	Okzhetpes	29	(3)

International career^{‡}
2011	Kazakhstan U19	6	(2)
2014–2015	Kazakhstan U21	6	(1)
2015–	Kazakhstan	3	(0)
- * Club domestic league appearances and goals as of 1 November 2026 ‡ National team caps and goals as of 9 October 2019

Toktar Sabituly Zhangylyshbay (Kazakh: Тоқтар Сәбитұлы Жанғылышбай; born 25 May 1993) is a Kazakh footballer who plays as a forward for Okzhetpes.

== Career ==
On 16 March 2016, Zhangylyshbay signed a 1-year contract, with the option of a second year, with FC Aktobe. On 5 July 2016, Zhangylyshbay left Aktobe by mutual consent, signing for FC Zhetysu the following day.

== Career statistics ==
=== Club ===
As of match played 8 November 2015

Club	Season	League		Cup		Europe		Other		Total	
Club	Season	Apps	Goals	Apps	Goals	Apps	Goals	Apps	Goals	Apps	Goals
Shakhter Karagandy	2011	6	1	0	0	0	0	-		6	1
Shakhter Karagandy	2012	0	0	0	0	0	0	-		0	0
Shakhter Karagandy	2013	12	0	2	1	0	0	-		14	1
Shakhter Karagandy	2014	14	3	1	0	0	0	-		15	3
Shakhter Karagandy	Total	32	4	3	1	0	0	-	-	35	5
Astana	2015	5	0	1	0	0	0	0	0	6	0
Kairat (loan)	2015	2	0	0	0	0	0	0	0	2	0
Aktobe	2016	12	2	1	0	-		-		13	2
Zhetysu	2016	12	2	0	0	-		-		12	2
Career totals		63	8	5	1	-	-	0	0	68	9

== Honours ==
=== Club ===
Shakhter Karagandy

- Kazakhstan Premier League: 2011
- Kazakhstan Cup: 2013
- Kazakhstan Super Cup: 2013

Astana

- Kazakhstan Super Cup: 2015
