= Mamadou Wagué =

French footballer (born 1990)

Personal information
- Date of birth: 19 August 1990 (age 36)
- Place of birth: Saint-Brieuc, France
- Height: 6 ft 3 in (1.91 m)
- Position: Centre back

Team information
- Current team: Assyriska
- Number: 3

Youth career
- 2003–2007: Paris FC
- 2007–2009: Le Mans

Senior career*
Years	Team	Apps	(Gls)
2009–2012	Le Mans	43	(5)
2012–2013	Metz	17	(0)
2013	Debrecen	6	(0)
2013	→ Debrecen II	11	(1)
2013–2014	Puskás	3	(0)
2014–2015	Ethnikos Achnas	19	(2)
2015–2016	Najran	10	(0)
2016	Assyriska	11	(3)
2016	Zhetysu	13	(0)
2017	Syrianska	0	(0)
2017–2018	Chornomorets Odesa	14	(1)
2018	Al-Shorta	0	(0)
2019–2020	Maccabi Ahi Nazareth	10	(0)
2020–2021	Alki Oroklini	0	(0)
2021–2022	Sri Pahang	3	(0)
2022	Zakho	3	(0)
2022–2024	Lancy	44	(4)
2024–	Assyriska	11	(1)

International career
2009	France U-19	4	
- * Club domestic league appearances and goals as of 9 November 2024

Mamadou Wagué (born 19 August 1990) is a French footballer who plays for Swedish club Assyriska FF as a defender.

== Career ==
Mamadou can play as either a defender or a holding midfielder and joined Le Mans's CFA squad in 2007 after arriving from Paris FC. His performances in the CFA earned him a call up to the senior squad. He made his professional debut on 7 February 2009 in a Ligue 1 match against Toulouse coming on as a substitute in the 80th minute. Le Mans lost the match 0–2. Due to the suspension of defender Grégory Cerdan, Mamadou was called up to the senior squad again, this time for their match against Lille on 17 February. On 6 March he agreed to his first professional contract, signing a three-year deal with the club.

On 23 June 2016, Wague signed with Kazakhstan Premier League side FC Zhetysu until the end of the 2016 season.

On 23 July 2020, he signed with the Cypriot club of Alki Oroklini.

On 10 February 2021, he left Cypriot Professional League in order to sign in Malaysia Super League club Sri Pahang F.C.

On 30 January 2022, he came back on Iraq Super League for the second time and signs for Zakho SC.

== Honors ==
- Winner of the Tournament called " Tournoi International de la Sarthe 2011"
- Champion of Hungary 2013
- Best defender of Saudi Arabia Premier League 2015-2016
- Best defender of Ukrainian Premier League 2017-2018
- Best Defender of Winter Break in Israel Championship 2019-2020
- Best Defender of Cypriot Premier League 2014-2015
