= Serhiy Yavorskyi =

Ukrainian footballer

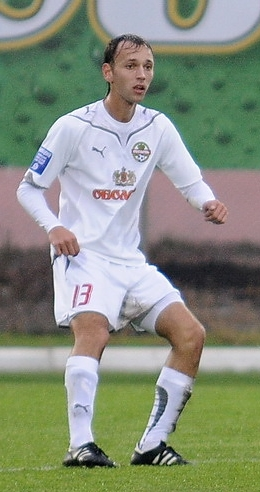

Personal information
- Full name: Serhiy Oleksandrovych Yavorskyi
- Date of birth: 5 July 1989 (age 37)
- Place of birth: Donetsk, Ukrainian SSR
- Height: 1.89 m (6 ft 2 1/2 in)
- Position: Defender

Team information
- Current team: Vakhsh Bokhtar
- Number: 13

Youth career
- 2003–2006: Olimpik Donetsk

Senior career*
Years	Team	Apps	(Gls)
2006–2012	Shakhtar Donetsk	0	(0)
2006–2007	→ Olimpik Donetsk (loan)	38	(3)
2007–2008	→ Illichivets Mariupol (loan)	36	(2)
2008–2010	→ Obolon Kyiv (loan)	56	(7)
2010–2012	→ Illichivets Marriupol (loan)	37	(0)
2012–2015	Illichivets Mariupol	53	(3)
2015–2016	Tobol	44	(3)
2017–2020	Mariupol	89	(3)
2020–2023	Vorskla Poltava	52	(1)
2023–2024	Lok Stendal	8	(0)
2024–	Vakhsh Bokhtar	44	(2)

International career^{‡}
2006	Ukraine U17	5	(0)
2006–2008	Ukraine U19	7	(0)
2009	Ukraine U21	1	(0)
- * Club domestic league appearances and goals as of 16 March 2026 ‡ National team caps and goals as of 10 August 2020

Serhiy Oleksandrovych Yavorskyi (Ukrainian: Сергій Олександрович Яворський; born 5 July 1989) is a Ukrainian professional footballer who plays as a defender for Tajikistani club Vakhsh Bokhtar.

== Career ==
Yavorskyi was born in Donetsk, Ukrainian SSR. He is a product of the FC Shakhtar Donetsk sportive school. He was loaned to FC Illichivets Mariupol in Ukrainian Premier League from 4 June 2010.

On 11 January 2012, Yavorskyi was signed full contract with FC Illichivets Mariupol in Ukrainian Premier League.

Yavorskyi left FC Tobol in December 2016.
