= Gjorgji Mojsov =

Macedonian footballer

Personal information
- Full name: Gjorgji Mojsov; Ґорѓи Мојсов
- Date of birth: 27 May 1985 (age 41)
- Place of birth: Kavadarci, SFR Yugoslavia
- Height: 1.84 m (6 ft 1/2 in)
- Position: Midfielder

Team information
- Current team: Zemun (manager)

Youth career
- Partizan

Senior career*
Years	Team	Apps	(Gls)
2005–2007	Pelister	5	(0)
2007–2008	Vardar	24	(1)
2008–2009	Rabotnički	17	(1)
2009	Oțelul Galați	7	(0)
2010	Győri ETO	1	(0)
2010–2011	Rabotnički	15	(0)
2011	Vardar	10	(0)
2011–2012	Metalac Gornji Milanovac	8	(0)
2012–2013	Turnovo	43	(3)
2013–2014	Pelister	27	(1)
2014–2015	Renova	45	(3)
2016	Zhetysu	1	(0)
2016–2017	Sileks	9	(0)
2017–2021	Tikvesh	86	(25)

International career
2005	Macedonia U19	5	(0)

Managerial career
- 2021–2022: Tikvesh (assistant)
- 2022–2025: Tikvesh
- 2026–: Zemun
- * Club domestic league appearances and goals

Gjorgji Mojsov (Macedonian: Ґорѓи Мојсов; born 27 May 1985) is a Macedonian professional football coach and former player.

== Club career ==
Throughout his playing career he was part of the Macedonian clubs FK Pelister, FK Vardar and FK Rabotnički, Romanian Oțelul Galați, Hungarian Győri ETO FC and Serbian FK Metalac Gornji Milanovac.

== Honours ==
Tikvesh

- Macedonian Cup: 2023–24

== Personal life ==
He is the older brother of the former Macedonian international defender Daniel Mojsov.
