= Marko Đalović =

Serbian footballer

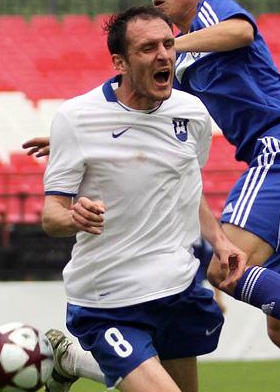
- Đalović with Baltika Kaliningrad in 2010

Personal information
- Full name: Marko Đalović
- Date of birth: 19 May 1986 (age 40)
- Place of birth: Kragujevac, SFR Yugoslavia
- Height: 1.88 m (6 ft 2 in)
- Position: Defender

Youth career
- Radnički Kragujevac
- Red Star Belgrade

Senior career*
| Years | Team | Apps | (Gls) |
| 2004–2006 | Srem | 65 | (1) |
| 2006–2007 | Bežanija | 36 | (1) |
| 2006–2007 | → Srem (loan) | 7 | (1) |
| 2008–2009 | Vojvodina | 2 | (0) |
| 2009 | Mladá Boleslav | 13 | (0) |
| 2010 | Baltika Kaliningrad | 30 | (1) |
| 2011–2014 | Zhetysu | 85 | (1) |
| 2015 | Novi Pazar | 15 | (0) |
| 2016 | Zhetysu | 28 | (2) |
| 2017–2024 | Zemun | 122 | (3) |

International career
| 2004–2005 | Serbia and Montenegro U19 | 4 | (0) |
- * Club domestic league appearances and goals

Marko Đalović (Serbian Cyrillic: Марко Ђаловић; born 19 May 1986) is a Serbian retired professional footballer who played as a defender.

== Club career ==
After coming through the youth system of Red Star Belgrade, Đalović made his senior debut at Srem in 2004. He was transferred to newly promoted Serbian SuperLiga club Bežanija in 2006.

Between 2009 and 2014, Đalović played abroad in the Czech Republic, Russia, and Kazakhstan. He briefly returned to his homeland to play for Novi Pazar in 2015, before rejoining Kazakh club Zhetysu in 2016.

== International career ==
Đalović represented Serbia and Montenegro at the 2005 UEFA European Under-19 Championship.
