= Marko Simonovski =

Macedonian footballer

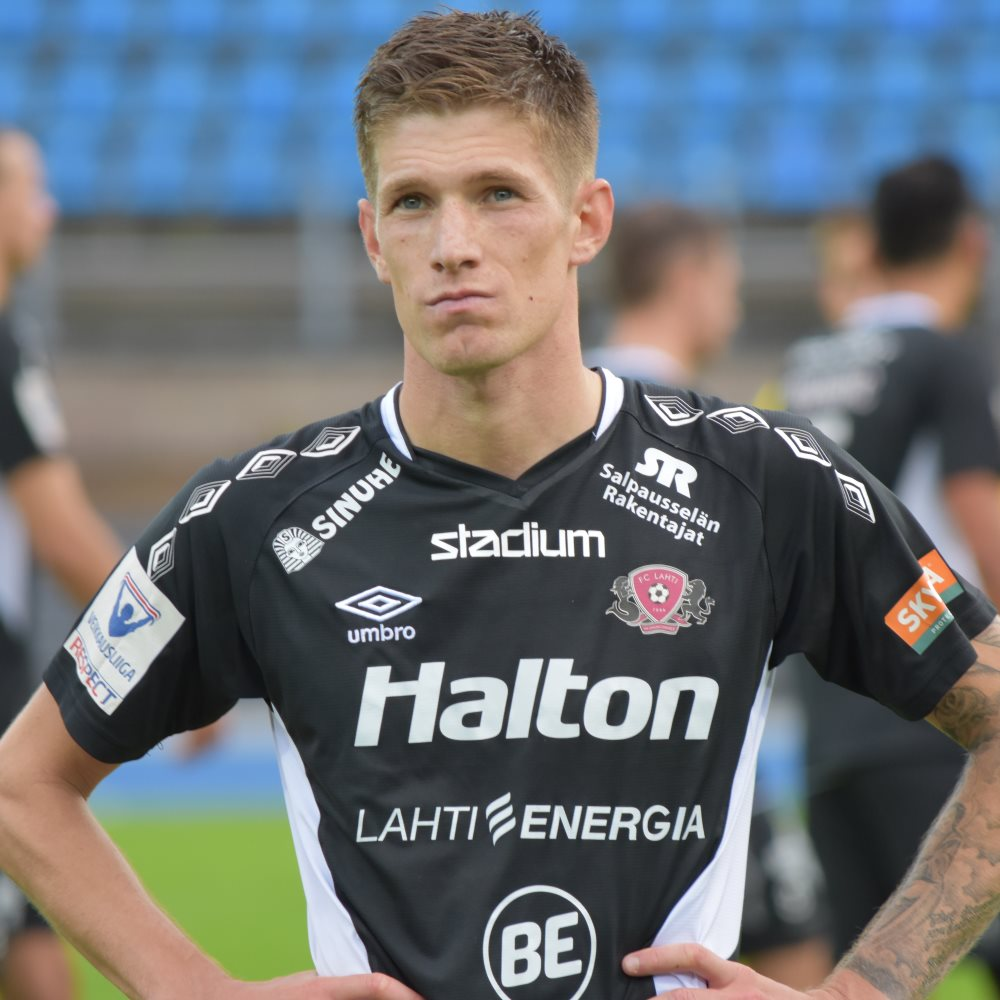
- Simonovski with FC Lahti in 2017

Personal information
- Date of birth: 2 January 1992 (age 34)
- Place of birth: Skopje, Macedonia
- Height: 1.85 m (6 ft 1 in)
- Position: Forward

Team information
- Current team: Enosis Neon Paralimni
- Number: 9

Youth career
- –2010: Vardar

Senior career*
| Years | Team | Apps | (Gls) |
| 2010–2014 | Metalurg Skopje | 73 | (16) |
| 2012 | → Napredok (loan) | 17 | (5) |
| 2014–2015 | Amkar Perm | 4 | (0) |
| 2015 | Split | 12 | (0) |
| 2016 | Zhetysu | 17 | (3) |
| 2016–2017 | Shakhter Karagandy | 10 | (2) |
| 2017 | Lahti | 32 | (13) |
| 2018–2019 | Sepsi OSK | 34 | (8) |
| 2019–2020 | Voluntari | 19 | (4) |
| 2020–2021 | Feronikeli | 20 | (12) |
| 2021–2023 | Drita | 59 | (28) |
| 2023–2024 | Qizilqum Zarafshon | 8 | (0) |
| 2024–2025 | KF Gostivari | 19 | (6) |
| 2025 | Bashkimi | 12 | (3) |
| 2026– | Enosis Neon Paralimni | 12 | (0) |

International career
| 2010–2011 | Macedonia U19 | 3 | (1) |
| 2012–2014 | Macedonia U21 | 9 | (1) |
| 2012–2014 | Macedonia | 3 | (0) |
- * Club domestic league appearances and goals as of 14 June 2026

Marko Simonovski (Macedonian: Марко Симоновски; born 2 January 1992) is a Macedonian footballer who plays as a forward for Enosis Neon Paralimni.

== Club career ==
On 23 February 2016, Simonovski signed for Kazakhstan Premier League side FC Zhetysu. On 5 July 2016, Simonovski joined FC Shakhter Karagandy.

== International career ==
He made his senior debut for Macedonia in a December 2012 friendly match against Poland and has earned a total of 3 caps, scoring no goals. His final international was a June 2014 friendly against China.

== Career statistics ==
As of match played 29 October 2016

Appearances and goals by club, season and competition
| Club | Season | League | | | Cup | | Europe | | Other | | Total | |
| Club | Season | Division | Apps | Goals | Apps | Goals | Apps | Goals | Apps | Goals | Apps | Goals |
|---|---|---|---|---|---|---|---|---|---|---|---|---|
| FK Metalurg | 2010–11 | Macedonian First League | 16 | 2 | 0 | 0 | 2 | 1 | – | | 18 | 3 |
| FK Metalurg | 2011–12 | Macedonian First League | 19 | 1 | 0 | 0 | 1 | 0 | 1 | 0 | 21 | 1 |
| FK Metalurg | 2012–13 | Macedonian First League | 11 | 5 | 0 | 0 | 2 | 0 | – | | 13 | 5 |
| FK Metalurg | 2013–14 | Macedonian First League | 27 | 8 | 4 | 0 | 5 | 2 | – | | 36 | 10 |
| FK Metalurg | Total | | 73 | 16 | 4 | 0 | 10 | 3 | 1 | 0 | 88 | 19 |
| Napredok (loan) | 2012–13 | Macedonian First League | 17 | 5 | 0 | 0 | – | | – | | 17 | 5 |
| Amkar Perm | 2014–15 | Russian Premier League | 4 | 0 | 0 | 0 | – | | – | | 4 | 0 |
| RNK Split | 2015–16 | 1. HNL | 12 | 0 | 0 | 0 | – | | – | | 12 | 0 |
| Zhetysu | 2016 | Kazakhstan Premier League | 17 | 3 | 2 | 0 | – | | – | | 19 | 3 |
| Shakhter Karagandy | 2016 | Kazakhstan Premier League | 10 | 2 | 0 | 0 | – | | – | | 10 | 2 |
| Lahti | 2017 | Veikkausliiga | 32 | 13 | 0 | 0 | – | | – | | 32 | 13 |
| Sepsi OSK | 2017–18 | Liga I | 12 | 3 | – | | – | | – | | 12 | 3 |
| Sepsi OSK | 2018–19 | Liga I | 20 | 5 | 1 | 1 | – | | – | | 21 | 6 |
| Sepsi OSK | 2019–20 | Liga I | 2 | 0 | – | | – | | – | | 2 | 0 |
| Sepsi OSK | Total | | 34 | 8 | 1 | 1 | 0 | 0 | 0 | 0 | 35 | 9 |
| Voluntari | 2019–20 | Liga I | 19 | 4 | 1 | 0 | – | | – | | 20 | 4 |
| Feronikeli | 2020–21 | Kosovo Superleague | 20 | 12 | 3 | 2 | – | | – | | 23 | 14 |
| Drita | 2021–22 | Kosovo Superleague | 28 | 15 | 6 | 1 | 4 | 2 | – | | 38 | 18 |
| Drita | 2022–23 | Kosovo Superleague | 27 | 12 | 1 | 1 | 4 | 1 | – | | 32 | 14 |
| Drita | Total | | 55 | 27 | 7 | 2 | 8 | 3 | 0 | 0 | 70 | 32 |
| Qizilqum Zarafshon | 2023 | Uzbekistan Super League | 8 | 0 | – | | – | | – | | 8 | 0 |
| Qizilqum Zarafshon | 2024 | Uzbeskistan Super League | 0 | 0 | 0 | 0 | – | | – | | 0 | 0 |
| Qizilqum Zarafshon | Total | | 8 | 0 | 0 | 0 | 0 | 0 | 0 | 0 | 8 | 0 |
| KF Gostivari | 2024–25 | Macedonian First League | 7 | 3 | 0 | 0 | – | | – | | 7 | 3 |
| Career total | | | 308 | 93 | 18 | 5 | 18 | 6 | 1 | 0 | 345 | 104 |
