= Bauyrzhan Turysbek =

Kazakhstani footballer

Personal information
- Date of birth: 15 October 1991 (age 35)
- Place of birth: Almaty, Kazakhstan
- Height: 1.78 m (5 ft 10 in)
- Position: Midfielder

Team information
- Current team: Zhetysu
- Number: 15

Youth career
- Sunkar

Senior career*
Years	Team	Apps	(Gls)
2009–2013	Sunkar	83	(16)
2014	Spartak Semey	13	(0)
2014	Radnički Niš	4	(0)
2015–2016	Zhetysu	43	(6)
2016–2017	Kairat	23	(5)
2017	→ Kairat Akademiya	7	(3)
2018–2019	Tobol	60	(12)
2020	Shakhter Karagandy	3	(1)
2020	Taraz	14	(3)
2021	Zhetysu	8	(2)
2022	FC Atyrau	9	(0)
2022-	Zhetysu	26	(16)

International career^{‡}
2017–	Kazakhstan	14	(3)
- * Club domestic league appearances and goals as of 11 July 2023 ‡ National team caps and goals as of 27 November 2020

Bauyrzhan Turysbek (Kazakh: Бауыржан Тұрысбек, born 15 October 1991) is a Kazakhstani professional footballer who plays as a midfielder for Zhetysu.

== Club career ==
Turysbek started his career in Sunkar, after youth career in same club. He had 13 appearances and 1 goal in Kazakhstan Premier League. In the first half of 2014, he played with Spartak Semey. In the summer of 2014, he moved abroad and joined Serbian SuperLiga club Radnički Niš. He made his Serbian SuperLiga debut for Radnički Niš on 29 September 2014 in away lost against Spartak Subotica with result 1–0. He was substituted in for Vladan Pavlović in the 85th minute of the match with number 44 on his back. He made four appearances with Radnički Niš in the first half of the 2014–15 season, before returning to Kazakhstan and joining top-flight side FC Zhetysu in early 2015.

On 21 June 2016, Turysbek signed a three-and-a-half-year contract with FC Kairat.

On 11 January 2018, FC Tobol announced the signing of Turysbek on a two-year contract.

== International career ==
On 10 June 2017, Turysbek was part of the Kazakhstan national team in a qualifying game for the 2018 FIFA World Cup against Denmark, but ended being an unused substitute.

He was called again for the next round of qualifiers but this time he debuted by entering as substitute in 62 minute, in a game against Montenegro played on 1 September 2017, that Montenegro won by 3–0. He scored his first international goal in a 3–1 loss against Romania.

== Career statistics ==
=== Club ===
As of match played 10 November 2019

Appearances and goals by club, season and competition
Club	Season	League			National cup		Continental		Other		Total	
Club	Season	Division	Apps	Goals	Apps	Goals	Apps	Goals	Apps	Goals	Apps	Goals
Sunkar	2009	Kazakhstan First Division	19	1	1	0	–		–		20	1
Sunkar	2010	Kazakhstan First Division	8	3	0	0	–		–		8	3
Sunkar	2011	Kazakhstan First Division	15	3	2	1	–		–		17	4
Sunkar	2012	Kazakhstan Premier League	13	1	1	0	–		–		14	1
Sunkar	2013	Kazakhstan First Division	28	8	2	0	–		–		30	8
Sunkar	Total		83	16	6	1	0	0	0	0	89	17
Spartak Semey	2014	Kazakhstan Premier League	13	0	0	0	–		–		13	0
Radnički Niš	2014–15	Serbian SuperLiga	4	0	1	0	–		–		5	0
Zhetysu	2015	Kazakhstan Premier League	26	4	2	1	–		1	0	29	5
Zhetysu	2016	Kazakhstan Premier League	17	2	2	0	–		–		19	2
Zhetysu	Total		43	6	4	1	0	0	1	0	48	7
Kairat	2016	Kazakhstan Premier League	9	0	2	0	1	1	0	0	12	1
Kairat	2017	Kazakhstan Premier League	14	5	4	0	3	0	0	0	21	5
Kairat	Total		23	5	6	0	4	1	0	0	33	6
Tobol	2018	Kazakhstan Premier League	30	4	2	1	4	1	–		36	6
Tobol	2019	Kazakhstan Premier League	30	8	3	3	2	0	–		35	11
Tobol	Total		60	12	5	4	6	1	0	0	71	17
Career total			226	39	22	6	10	21	1	0	259	47

=== International ===
Kazakhstan national team
Year	Apps	Goals
2017	3	2
2018	5	1
Total	8	3

Statistics accurate as of match played 16 October 2018

Scores and results list Kazakhstan's goal tally first

No.	Date	Venue	Opponent	Score	Result	Competition
1.	5 October 2017	Ilie Oană Stadium, Ploiești, Romania	Romania	1–3	1–3	2018 FIFA World Cup qualification
2.	8 October 2017	Astana Arena, Astana, Kazakhstan	Armenia	1–1	1–1	2018 FIFA World Cup qualification
3.	16 October 2018	Astana Arena, Astana, Kazakhstan	Andorra	2–0	4–0	2018–19 UEFA Nations League D

== Honours ==
Sunkar

- Kazakhstan First Division: 2011

Kairat

- Kazakhstan Cup: 2017
- Kazakhstan Super Cup: 2017
