= Przemysław Trytko =

Polish footballer

Personal information
- Full name: Przemysław Trytko
- Date of birth: 26 August 1987 (age 39)
- Place of birth: Opole, Poland
- Height: 1.89 m (6 ft 2 in)
- Position: Forward

Youth career
- Budowlani Strzelce Opolskie
- Odra Opole
- 2003–2006: Gwarek Zabrze

Senior career*
Years	Team	Apps	(Gls)
2006–2008	Energie Cottbus II	27	(1)
2006–2010	Energie Cottbus	1	(0)
2008–2010	→ Arka Gdynia (loan)	46	(8)
2010	Jagiellonia Białystok	6	(0)
2011–2012	→ Polonia Bytom (loan)	20	(4)
2012–2013	Carl Zeiss Jena	21	(7)
2013–2016	Korona Kielce	64	(15)
2016	Atyrau	28	(7)
2017	Arka Gdynia	11	(2)
2017–2019	Chrobry Głogów	31	(3)
2019–2020	ROW Rybnik	3	(0)
2020	Bałtyk Gdynia	1	(0)
2020–2021	Gryf Wejherowo	21	(8)
2021–2022	Goczałkowice-Zdrój	10	(0)
2022–2023	Piast Strzelce Opolskie	11	(1)
Total		301	(56)
- * Club domestic league appearances and goals

Przemysław Trytko (born 26 August 1987) is a Polish former professional footballer who played as a forward.

== Career ==
=== Club ===
Trytko was born in Opole. After spending three years with Gwarek Zabrze, he joined German club FC Energie Cottbus in 2006 at the age of 19. Two years later, he joined Ekstraklasa side Arka Gdynia on a two-year loan. In the summer of 2010 he signed a three-year contract with Jagiellonia Białystok.

In February 2011, he was loaned to Polonia Bytom on a half-year deal.

On 8 August 2012, Trytko joined German Regionalliga Nordost side FC Carl Zeiss Jena on a season-long loan deal, which was made permanent in January 2013. He returned to Poland in July 2013 to sign for Korona Kielce.

In February 2016, Trytko signed for Kazakhstan Premier League side FC Atyrau.

== Honours ==
Jagiellonia Białystok

- Polish Super Cup: 2010

Arka Gdynia

- Polish Cup: 2016–17
