= Narek Beglaryan =

Armenian football striker

Personal information
- Full name: Narek Samveli Beglaryan
- Date of birth: 1 September 1985 (age 41)
- Place of birth: Noyemberyan, Soviet Union
- Height: 1.84 m (6 ft 1/2 in)
- Position: Striker

Team information
- Current team: Alashkert

Youth career
- Mika

Senior career*
Years	Team	Apps	(Gls)
2005–2012	Mika	125	(34)
2012	Tatran Prešov	5	(0)
2012–2013	Mika	14	(4)
2013–2014	Gandzasar Kapan	33	(13)
2014–2015	Mika	5	(1)
2015	Racing Beirut		
2015–2016	Gandzasar Kapan	36	(8)
2016–2017	Zhetysu	11	(2)
2017	Alashkert	1	(1)
- * Club domestic league appearances and goals as of 20 February 2020

Narek Samveli Beglaryan (Armenian: Նարեկ Սամվելի Բեգլարյան, born 1 September 1985 in Noyemberyan) is a former Armenian football striker, who plays for Alashkert.

== Career ==
Narek started his career with his local club, Mika. Beglaryan became the second best scorer in 2011 season with 11 goals.

=== 1. FC Tatran Prešov ===
On 25 January 2012, he joined the Corgoň Liga club Tatran Prešov on a half-year contract. He made his first team debut on 3 March 2012, replacing Dávid Guba from the bench after eighty minutes in a 0–1 loss, in a derby against Košice.

=== Zhetysu ===
On 12 July 2016, Beglaryan signed for Kazakhstan Premier League side Zhetysu.
