= Dušan Savić (footballer, born 1985) =

Macedonian footballer

Personal information
- Full name: Dušan Savić
- Date of birth: 1 October 1985 (age 41)
- Place of birth: Niš, SFR Yugoslavia
- Height: 1.73 m (5 ft 8 in)
- Position: Striker

Youth career
- Red Star Belgrade

Senior career*
Years	Team	Apps	(Gls)
2003–2004	Dubočica		
2004–2006	Belasica	55	(11)
2006–2007	Pobeda	27	(16)
2007–2008	Vardar	21	(4)
2008–2009	Rabotnički	38	(16)
2010	Brașov	10	(2)
2010	Incheon United	2	(0)
2011	Pakhtakor	13	(7)
2011	Rabotnički	8	(2)
2012–2013	Volyn Lutsk	27	(6)
2013	Hoverla Uzhhorod	9	(1)
2014	Kaisar	18	(3)
2014	Slavia Sofia	8	(1)
2015–2016	Zhetysu	51	(24)
2016–2017	Tobol	22	(3)
2017	Aktobe	16	(4)
2018	Zemun	15	(1)
2019	Belasica	16	(5)
2019–2024	Dubočica	82	(43)
2024	Sloga Lipovica	2	(1)

International career^{‡}
2005	Macedonia U-21	3	(0)
2007–2013	Macedonia	9	(0)

Managerial career
- 2026–: Dubočica (assistant)
- 2026: Dubočica (caretaker)
- * Club domestic league appearances and goals as of 11:09, 26 May 2019 (UTC) ‡ National team caps and goals as of 7 February 2014

Dušan Savić (Macedonian: Душан Савиќ, Serbian Cyrillic: Душан Савић; born 1 October 1985) is a Macedonian international footballer who plays as a striker.

== Playing career ==
=== Club ===
Born in Niš, SR Serbia, back then part of Yugoslavia, Savić initially played for Serbian giants Red Star Belgrade youth teams. He made his debut as senior playing in Serbian lower-league side FK Dubočica. From there, Savić moved in summer 2004 to neighbouring Macedonia where he signed with FK Belasica paying in the Macedonian First Football League.

In March 2014, Savić signed for Kazakhstan Premier League side FC Kaisar.

On 18 February 2015, Savić signed for FC Zhetysu, extending his contract for a second year on 29 January 2016.

On 5 July 2016, Savić moved to fellow Kazakhstan Premier League side FC Tobol on an eighteen-month contract.

=== International ===
He was part of the U-21 team, before making his senior debut for Macedonia in an August 2007 friendly match against Nigeria. He has earned a total of 9 caps, scoring no goals and his final international was a June 2013 friendly against Norway.

== Honours ==
Pobeda

- Macedonian First League: 2006–07

Rabotnički

- Macedonian Football Cup: 2008–09

Pakhtakor

- Uzbek Cup: 2011
