= 2018 FC Ordabasy season =

FC Ordabasy
2018 season
- Chairman: Kaysar Abdraymov
- Manager: Georgi Dermendzhiev
- Stadium: Kazhymukan Munaitpasov Stadium
- Premier League: 5th
- Kazakhstan Cup: Quarterfinal Kairat
- Top goalscorer: League: Abdoulaye Diakate (7); All: Abdoulaye Diakate (7)
Home colours	Away colours

The 2018 FC Ordabasy season is the 16th successive season that the club will play in the Kazakhstan Premier League, the highest tier of association football in Kazakhstan. Ordabasy will also participate in the Kazakhstan Cup and the Europa League.

== Season events ==
On 11 January 2018, Georgi Dermendzhiev was appointed as the new manager of Ordabasy.

After finishing the previous season in third position, Ordabasy would have qualified for the Europa League first qualifying round but they failed to obtain a UEFA licence.

== Squad ==
As of 8 August 2018

Note: Flags indicate national team as defined under FIFA eligibility rules; some limited exceptions apply. Players may hold more than one non-FIFA nationality.

No.	Pos.	Nation	Player
1	GK	KAZ	Bekhan Shayzada
2	DF	KAZ	Bakdaoulet Kozhabaev
5	DF	KAZ	Damir Dautov
6	MF	KAZ	Ular Zhaksybaev
7	FW	SRB	Nemanja Kojić
8	DF	KAZ	Temirlan Erlanov
9	FW	KAZ	Vitali Li
10	MF	KAZ	Kairat Ashirbekov
11	MF	UKR	Kyrylo Kovalchuk
14	MF	KAZ	Samat Shamshi
17	DF	KAZ	Mardan Tolebek
19	MF	BIH	Mirzad Mehanović (loan from Fastav Zlín)

No.	Pos.	Nation	Player
21	MF	KAZ	Yerkebulan Tungyshbayev
22	MF	SEN	Abdoulaye Diakate
27	MF	KAZ	Timur Dosmagambetov
29	DF	ARG	Pablo Fontanello
33	MF	RUS	Nikita Bocharov
34	GK	KAZ	Zhasur Narzikulov
39	DF	FRA	Helton
70	MF	CRO	Luka Muženjak
71	FW	KAZ	Zhasulan Moldakaraev
77	DF	KAZ	Talgat Adyrbekov
91	FW	KAZ	Sergei Khizhnichenko

=== On Loan ===
Note: Flags indicate national team as defined under FIFA eligibility rules; some limited exceptions apply. Players may hold more than one non-FIFA nationality.

No. / Pos. / Nation / Player; 71 / FW / KAZ / Tanat Nusserbayev (at Tobol)	No. / Pos. / Nation / Player; 87 / DF / SRB / Aleksandar Simčević (at Aktobe)

== Transfers ==
=== Winter ===
In: Note: Flags indicate national team as defined under FIFA eligibility rules; some limited exceptions apply. Players may hold more than one non-FIFA nationality.

No.	Pos.	Nation	Player
1	GK	KAZ	Bekhan Shayzada
2	DF	KAZ	Bakdaoulet Kozhabaev
5	DF	KAZ	Damir Dautov (from (Kazakhstan) Irtysh Pavlodar)
7	MF	ARG	Facundo Bertoglio (from (Cyprus) APOEL)
14	MF	KAZ	Samat Shamshi (from (Kazakhstan) Kyran)
18	MF	KAZ	Bekzhan Abdrakhman (from (Kazakhstan) Atyrau)
19	MF	KAZ	Abylkhar Zulfikarov
27	MF	KAZ	Timur Dosmagambetov (from (Kazakhstan) Okzhetpes)
31	MF	GEO	Jaba Jighauri (loan from (Kazakhstan) Aktobe)
34	GK	KAZ	Zhasur Narzikulov (from (Kazakhstan) Atyrau)
44	DF	CRO	Hrvoje Spahija (from (Romania) Universitatea Craiova)
70	FW	UZB	Ivan Nagaev (from (Uzbekistan) Buxoro)
77	DF	KAZ	Talgat Adyrbekov (loan return from (Kazakhstan) Okzhetpes)
91	FW	KAZ	Sergei Khizhnichenko (from (Kazakhstan) Shakhter Karagandy)
95	FW	KAZ	Alisher Suley (from (Kazakhstan) Atyrau)
99	GK	KAZ	David Loria (from (Kazakhstan) Irtysh Pavlodar)
—	MF	KAZ	Didar Zhalmukan (loan from (Kazakhstan) Astana)

Out: Note: Flags indicate national team as defined under FIFA eligibility rules; some limited exceptions apply. Players may hold more than one non-FIFA nationality.

No.	Pos.	Nation	Player
1	GK	KAZ	Almat Bekbaev
2	DF	KAZ	Baudaulet Kozhabayev
4	DF	KAZ	Mukhtar Mukhtarov
8	MF	KAZ	Samat Smakov (Retired)
13	MF	KAZ	Azat Nurgaliev (to (Kazakhstan) Tobol)
18	MF	CRO	Oliver Petrak (to (Poland) Korona Kielce)
23	GK	BLR	Valery Fomichev
25	GK	KAZ	Ramil Nurmukhametov (to (Kazakhstan) Aktobe)
29	GK	KAZ	Sergey Boychenko (to (Kazakhstan) Okzhetpes)
30	MF	KAZ	Sanat Zhumahanov
33	FW	BUL	Preslav Yordanov (to (Bulgaria) Pirin Blagoevgrad)
50	MF	UZB	Alexander Geynrikh (to (Kazakhstan) Aktobe)
55	DF	KAZ	Farkhadbek Irismetov
71	FW	KAZ	Tanat Nusserbayev (loan to (Kazakhstan) Tobol)
77	FW	SRB	Srđan Vujaklija (to (South Korea) Gwangju)
81	MF	COL	Roger Cañas (to (Belarus) Shakhtyor Soligorsk)
87	DF	SRB	Aleksandar Simčević (on loan to (Kazakhstan) Aktobe)
88	MF	KAZ	Bekzat Beisenov
—	GK	KAZ	Yaroslav Bondarenko

=== Summer ===
In: Note: Flags indicate national team as defined under FIFA eligibility rules; some limited exceptions apply. Players may hold more than one non-FIFA nationality.

No.	Pos.	Nation	Player
7	FW	SRB	Nemanja Kojić (from (Turkey) İstanbulspor)
19	MF	BIH	Mirzad Mehanović (loan from (Czech Republic) Fastav Zlín)
39	DF	FRA	Helton (from (Bulgaria) Septemvri Sofia)
70	MF	CRO	Luka Muženjak (from (Croatia) Cibalia)
71	FW	KAZ	Zhasulan Moldakaraev (from (Kazakhstan) Tobol)

Out: Note: Flags indicate national team as defined under FIFA eligibility rules; some limited exceptions apply. Players may hold more than one non-FIFA nationality.

No.	Pos.	Nation	Player
7	MF	ARG	Facundo Bertoglio (to (Greece) PAS Lamia 1964)
18	FW	KAZ	Bekzhan Abdrakhman
31	MF	GEO	Jaba Jighauri (loan return to (Kazakhstan) Aktobe)
44	DF	CRO	Hrvoje Spahija
70	FW	UZB	Ivan Nagaev (to (Uzbekistan) Qizilqum Zarafshon)
95	FW	KAZ	Alisher Suley (to (Kazakhstan) Taraz)
99	GK	KAZ	David Loria (to (Kazakhstan) Kairat)
—	DF	KAZ	Abylkhar Zulfikarov

=== Released ===
Date	Position	Nationality	Name	Joined	Date	Ref.
31 December 2019	GK	(Kazakhstan)	Zhasur Narzikulov	Tobol	26 June 2019	
31 December 2019	DF	(France)	Helton			
31 December 2019	DF	(Kazakhstan)	Sagadat Tursynbay	Irtysh Pavlodar		
31 December 2019	DF	(Serbia)	Aleksandar Simčević	Aktobe		
31 December 2019	MF	(Croatia)	Luka Muženjak	BSK Bijelo Brdo		
31 December 2019	MF	(Kazakhstan)	Kairat Ashirbekov	Retired		
31 December 2019	MF	(Kazakhstan)	Yerkebulan Tungyshbayev	Kairat	7 January 2019	
31 December 2019	MF	(Russia)	Nikita Bocharov	Tobol	21 January 2019	
31 December 2019	FW	(Kazakhstan)	Sergei Khizhnichenko	Astana		
31 December 2019	FW	(Kazakhstan)	Zhasulan Moldakaraev	Okzhetpes		
31 December 2019	FW	(Kazakhstan)	Tanat Nusserbayev	Okzhetpes	13 March 2019	
31 December 2019	FW	(Serbia)	Nemanja Kojić	Tokyo Verdy	16 January 2019	

== Friendlies ==
19 January 2018	Ordabasy (Kazakhstan)	0 – 4	(Croatia) Dinamo Zagreb	Belek, Turkey
(UTC+6)		Report	Goal

24 January 2018	Ordabasy (Kazakhstan)	3 – 3	(Russia) Krasnodar	Belek, Turkey
(UTC+6)	Tungyshbayev; Diakate	Report	Goal	Stadium: Kalisto Stadium

27 January 2018	Ordabasy (Kazakhstan)	3 – 1	(Georgia (country)) Samtredia	Belek, Turkey
(UTC+6)	Diakate; Fontanello; B.Abrahman	Report	Goal

== Competitions ==
=== Premier League ===
==== Results summary ====
Overall								Home						Away					
Pld	W	D	L	GF	GA	GD	Pts	W	D	L	GF	GA	GD	W	D	L	GF	GA	GD
33	13	7	13	38	44	−6	46	9	2	6	20	17	+3	4	5	7	18	27	−9

Last updated: 11 November 2018.
Source: See Results

==== Results by round ====
Round	1	2	3	4	5	6	7	8	9	10	11	12	13	14	15	16	17	18	19	20	21	22	23	24	25	26	27	28	29	30	31	32	33
Ground	H	H	A	H	A	H	A	H	A	A	H	A	H	A	H	A	H	A	H	H	A	A	A	H	H	H	A	A	H	A	H	A	H
Result	W	W	W	W	L	L	D	W	L	L	L	W	L	L	W	L	L	W	W	L	D	D	L	W	D	L	D	L	W	D	D	W	W
Position	4	4	2	2	3	4	4	3	3	4	4	4	4	4	4	4	4	4	4	4	4	4	4	4	4	5	6	6	5	6	6	4	4

Source: See results
A = Away; H = Home; W = Win; D = Draw; L = Loss

==== Results ====
11 March 2018 1	Ordabasy	2 – 1	Shakhter Karagandy	Shymkent
15:00 (UTC+6)	Tungyshbayev 22'; Erlanov (yellow card) 48'; Nagaev 63'; Diakate (yellow card) 80'	Report	Shakhmetov (yellow card) 19'; Kojašević (yellow card) 40' (goal) 51'; Vůch (yellow card) 61'; Y.Tarasov (yellow card) 90+1'	Stadium: Kazhymukan Munaitpasov Stadium; Attendance: 12,000; Referee: Timur Kumashev

17 March 2018 2	Ordabasy	2 – 1	Kyzylzhar	Shymkent
15:00 (UTC+6)	Spahija (yellow card) 45'; Diakate 48' (pen.); Popkhadze 66' (o.g.); Nagaev (yellow card) 70'	Report	Gogua (yellow card) 10'; Punoševac (yellow card) 42'; T.Muldinov 45+1'; Muldarov (yellow card) 50'	Stadium: Kazhymukan Munaitpasov Stadium; Attendance: 3,000; Referee: Grigory Moskovchenko

31 March 2018 3	Atyrau	0 – 1	Ordabasy	Atyrau
16:00 (UTC+6)	Ablitarov (yellow card) 70'	Report	Nagaev (yellow card) 15'; M.Tolebek (yellow card) 40'; Diakate 71' (pen.) (yellow card) 78'	Stadium: Tomarly Stadium; Attendance: 2,000; Referee: Sergey Gorokhovodatskiy

7 April 2018 4	Ordabasy	3 – 1	Aktobe	Shymkent
17:00 (UTC+6)	Erlanov 14'; Dosmagambetov 17'; Nagaev 66'	Report	B.Kairov (yellow card) 37'; Miličević 44'	Stadium: Kazhymukan Munaitpasov Stadium; Attendance: 3,500; Referee: Marat Iskakov

13 April 2018 5	Akzhayik	4 – 1	Ordabasy	Aksay
15:00 (UTC+6)	I.Antipov 13'; Nurgaliyev 17' (pen.); E.Tapalov (yellow card) 21'; Eseola 44', 78'	Report	Spahija (red card) 26'; D.Dautov (yellow card) 31'; Dosmagambetov 38' (yellow card) 56'; Nagaev (yellow card) 54'	Stadium: Karaşıganak Stadium; Attendance: 1,200; Referee: Igor Chesnokov

22 April 2018 6	Ordabasy	1 – 2	Astana	Shymkent
17:00 (UTC+6)	Tungyshbayev 44'; Jighauri (yellow card) 85'; Diakate (yellow card) 89'	Report	Beisebekov (yellow card) 23'; Mayewski (yellow card) 27'; Shchotkin 29', 38'; Kleinheisler (yellow card) 32'; Malyi (yellow card) 51'; Stanojević (yellow card) 90+1'	Stadium: Kazhymukan Munaitpasov Stadium; Attendance: 14,700; Referee: Aydin Rakhimbayev

28 April 2018 7	Kaisar	0 – 0	Ordabasy	Kyzylorda
16:00 (UTC+6)	Korobkin (yellow card) 68'; Graf (yellow card) 88'	Report	Bertoglio (yellow card) 30'	Stadium: Gani Muratbayev Stadium; Attendance: 3,000; Referee: Denis Labashov

5 May 2018 8	Ordabasy	1 – 0	Irtysh Pavlodar	Shymkent
18:00 (UTC+6)	Bocharov 54'; Spahija (yellow card) 64'	Report	Avrămia (yellow card) 7'; R.Yesimov (yellow card) 19' (yellow-red card) 61'; V.Vomenko (yellow card) 41'; Kislyak (yellow card) 51'; Fonseca (yellow card) 70'; Bekbaev (yellow card) 90+5'	Stadium: Kazhymukan Munaitpasov Stadium; Attendance: 5,000; Referee: Ruslan Omarov

9 May 2018 9	Kairat	2 – 0	Ordabasy	Almaty
17:00 (UTC+6)	Isael 18'; Suyumbayev (yellow card) 37'; Silveira 70'	Report		Stadium: Central Stadium; Attendance: 13,500; Referee: Bagdat Abdullaev

14 May 2018 10	Zhetysu	4 – 2	Ordabasy	Taldıqorğan
17:00 (UTC+6)	Bojović 28', 45+1' (pen.), 60'; Glavina (yellow card) 30'; R.Jalilov (yellow card) 39'; Kuklys 79'; N.Ayazbaev (yellow card) 85'	Report	T.Adyrbekov (yellow card) 22'; U.Zhaksybaev (yellow card) 51'; Jighauri 78', 90+3'; Dosmagambetov (yellow card) 81'	Stadium: Zhetysu Stadium; Attendance: 1,000; Referee: Artyom Kuchin

19 May 2018 11	Ordabasy	0 – 1	Tobol	Shymkent
18:00 (UTC+6)	Kovalchuk (yellow card) 41'; Dosmagambetov (yellow card) 58'	Report	Turysbek 20'; Darabayev (yellow card) 44'; Kankava (yellow card) 48'; Žulpa (yellow card) 55'; Miroshnichenko (yellow card) 58'; Kassaï (yellow card) 86'; Moldakaraev (yellow card) 90+5'	Stadium: Kazhymukan Munaitpasov Stadium; Attendance: 3,500; Referee: Aleksandr Gauzer

27 May 2018 12	Kyzylzhar	1 – 2	Ordabasy	Petropavl
16:00 (UTC+6)	Coronel 17' (yellow card) 57'; Delić (yellow card) 78'	Report	Spahija (yellow card) 36'; Fontanello (yellow card) 43'; Diakate 45'; U.Zhaksybaev (yellow card) 52'; Tungyshbayev 79'; S.Shamshi (yellow card) 90+4'	Stadium: Avangard Stadium; Attendance: 4,000; Referee: Denis Izmailov

31 May 2018 13	Ordabasy	0 – 2	Atyrau	Shymkent
19:00 (UTC+6)	Dosmagambetov (yellow card) 15'; Nagaev (yellow card) 59'; Spahija (yellow card) 74'	Report	Khairullin (yellow card) 17'; Zyankovich 25'; Chichulin (yellow card) 54'; A.Nurybekov (yellow card) 79'; Adeniji 89'; A.Saparov (yellow card) 90+1'	Stadium: Kazhymukan Munaitpasov Stadium; Attendance: 2,500; Referee: Igor Aleshin

17 June 2018 14	Aktobe	3 – 1	Ordabasy	Aktobe
21:00 (UTC+6)	Pizzelli 50'; Valiullin (yellow card) 57'; Reynaldo 63'; Radin 73'; Z.Kukeyev (yellow card) 74'; Simčević (yellow card) 74'	Report	D.Dautov (yellow card) 34'; Jighauri 44'; Fontanello (yellow card) 49'; Bertoglio (yellow card) 74'	Stadium: Central Stadium; Attendance: 9,500; Referee: Sergey Gorokhovodatskiy

23 June 2018 15	Ordabasy	2 – 1	Akzhayik	Shymkent
19:00 (UTC+6)	Tungyshbayev 44'; Jighauri (yellow card) 62'; Nagaev 77'	Report	Mané 39' (yellow card) 83'	Stadium: Kazhymukan Munaitpasov Stadium; Attendance: 1,300; Referee: Saken Bayimbet

30 June 2018 16	Astana	5 – 3	Ordabasy	Astana
16:00 (UTC+6)	Postnikov (yellow card) 10'; Murtazayev 34', 36'; Shomko 45+1'; Logvinenko (yellow card) 71'; Shchotkin 90+1'; Despotović 90+5'	Report	Diakate 9' (pen.); Fontanello (yellow card) 22'; Bertoglio 54' (yellow card) 89'; Bocharov 82'; V.Li (yellow card) 90+2'	Stadium: Astana Arena; Attendance: 6,000; Referee: Grigory Moskovchenko

5 July 2018 17	Ordabasy	1 – 2	Kaisar	Shymkent
20:00 (UTC+6)	Diakate 9' (pen.) (yellow card) 87'; Bertoglio (yellow card) 49'; U.Zhaksybaev (yellow card) 56'; M.Tolebek (yellow card) 90+4'	Report	Narzildaev (yellow card) 42'; Coureur 57' (pen.); Were (yellow card) 69'; Tagybergen 77'; Baizhanov (yellow card) 82' (yellow-red card) 87'	Stadium: Kazhymukan Munaitpasov Stadium; Attendance: 2,300; Referee: Bakhyt Kyzylbaev

15 July 2018 18	Irtysh Pavlodar	1 – 2	Ordabasy	Pavlodar
18:30 (UTC+6)	Fonseca (yellow card) 56' (goal) 77'; Adri (yellow card) 78'; Stamenković (yellow card) 79'	Report	Tungyshbayev 43'; Ashirbekov (yellow card) 79'; Erlanov (yellow card) 84' (goal) 89'	Stadium: Central Stadium; Attendance: 1,000; Referee: Aydın Rakhimbayev

22 July 2018 19	Ordabasy	2 – 1	Kairat	Shymkent
20:00 (UTC+6)	Erlanov 13'; V.Li (yellow card) 50'; Kovalchuk (yellow card) 56'; Diakate 84' (pen.)	Report	Kuat (yellow card) 44'; Eseola 54'; Abiken (yellow card) 82'; Pokatilov (yellow card) 84'; Islamkhan (yellow card) 85'	Stadium: Kazhymukan Munaitpasov Stadium; Attendance: 3,500; Referee: Igor Chesnokov

29 July 2018 20	Ordabasy	1 – 2	Zhetysu	Shymkent
20:00 (UTC+6)	Diakate 67' (pen.)	Report	Kuklys 16'; Malakyan 27'; Sadownichy (yellow card) 76'; Kozhamberdi (yellow card) 84' (yellow-red card) 90+2'	Stadium: Kazhymukan Munaitpasov Stadium; Attendance: 4,000; Referee: Artyom Kuchin

5 August 2018 21	Tobol	1 – 1	Ordabasy	Kostanay
19:00 (UTC+6)	Kankava (yellow card) 8'; Darabayev 54'	Report	D.Dautov (yellow card) 60'; Fontanello (yellow card) 62'; Kojić 64'; Moldakaraev (yellow card) 73'; M.Tolebek (yellow card) 83'	Stadium: Central Stadium; Attendance: 3,000; Referee: Bolat Karlibayev

12 August 2018 22	Shakhter Karagandy	0 – 0	Ordabasy	Karaganda
20:00 (UTC+6)	M.Gabyshev (yellow card) 26'; Tkachuk (yellow card) 32'; Chichulin (yellow card) 90+2'	Report	Kovalchuk (yellow card) 36'; D.Dautov (yellow card) 77'; S.Shamshi (yellow card) 81'; Kojić (yellow card) 90+2'	Stadium: Shakhter Stadium; Attendance: 3,000; Referee: Denis Tevyashov

19 August 2018 23	Kaisar	2 – 1	Ordabasy	Kyzylorda
18:00 (UTC+6)	Punoševac 34', 55'; Coureur (yellow card) 57'; Grigorenko (yellow card) 90+4'	Report	Diakate (yellow card) 45+1'; Moldakaraev (yellow card) 47'; Kojić 83'	Stadium: Gani Muratbayev Stadium; Attendance: 2,000; Referee: Denis Izmailov

25 August 2018 24	Ordabasy	1 – 0	Akzhayik	Shymkent
20:00 (UTC+6)	B.Shaikhov 28' (o.g.); Moldakaraev (yellow card) 40'; Dosmagambetov (yellow card) 70'; Tungyshbayev (yellow card) 86'	Report	Glavina (yellow card) 12'; Basov (yellow card) 52'	Stadium: Kazhymukan Munaitpasov Stadium; Attendance: 2,700; Referee: Timur Kumashev

16 September 2018 26	Ordabasy	0 – 0	Aktobe	Shymkent
20:00 (UTC+6)		Report	Volkov (yellow card) 29'; Radin (yellow card) 58'; Z.Kukeyev (yellow card) 71'	Stadium: Kazhymukan Munaitpasov Stadium; Attendance: 3,000; Referee: Aleksandr Gauzer

22 September 2018 27	Ordabasy	0 – 2	Irtysh Pavlodar	Shymkent
19:00 (UTC+6)	Muženjak (yellow card) 18' (yellow-red card) 57'; Helton (yellow card) 50'; Erlanov (yellow card) 76'	Report	Seco 36'; Stamenković (yellow card) 76'; Shabalin 80'; A.Popov (yellow card) 90+5'	Stadium: Kazhymukan Munaitpasov Stadium; Attendance: 1,200; Referee: Artyom Kuchin

26 September 2018 25	Zhetysu	1 – 1	Ordabasy	Taldıqorğan
16:00 (UTC+6)	Kuantayev (yellow card) 48'; Hromțov 66' (pen.)	Report	Erlanov 28' (yellow card) 63'; Diakate (yellow card) 76'	Stadium: Zhetysu Stadium; Attendance: 1,000; Referee: Marat Iskakov

30 September 2018 28	Tobol	1 – 0	Ordabasy	Kostanay
18:00 (UTC+6)	Nusserbayev 69'; Nepohodov (yellow card) 83'	Report	Diakate (yellow card) 22'; M.Tolebek (yellow card) 90+5'	Stadium: Central Stadium; Attendance: 4,200; Referee: Grigory Moskovchenko

6 October 2018 29	Ordabasy	2 – 0	Kairat	Shymkent
17:00 (UTC+6)	Moldakaraev 38'; Kojić (yellow card) 41'; Dosmagambetov 90+3' (yellow card) 90+3'; Mehanović (yellow card) 90+4'	Report	Eseola (yellow card) 45+2'; Suyumbayev (yellow card) 57'	Stadium: Kazhymukan Munaitpasov Stadium; Attendance: 3,000; Referee: Bakhyt Kyzylbaev

20 October 2018 30	Astana	1 – 1	Ordabasy	Astana
19:00 (UTC+6)	Tomasov 53'	Report	Kovalchuk (yellow card) 19'; Dosmagambetov (yellow card) 21'; Moldakaraev 55'; B.Shayzada (yellow card) 90+3'	Stadium: Astana Arena; Attendance: 1,700; Referee: Igor Chesnokov

27 October 2018 31	Ordabasy	1 – 1	Shakhter Karagandy	Shymkent
16:00 (UTC+6)	Moldakaraev 16' (yellow card) 16'	Report	Najaryan (yellow card) 48'; Shakhmetov 57'; Vůch (yellow card) 72'	Stadium: Kazhymukan Munaitpasov Stadium; Attendance: 2,000; Referee: Denis Izmailov

3 November 2018 32	Kyzylzhar	1 – 2	Ordabasy	Petropavl
15:00 (UTC+6)	I.Aitov (yellow card) 19'; Popkhadze (yellow card) 39'; T.Muldinov 61'	Report	Diakate (yellow card) 25'; Moldakaraev 59'; U.Zhaksybaev (yellow card) 76'; Kojić 90+3'	Stadium: Avangard Stadium; Attendance: 3,800; Referee: Sergey Gorokhovodatskiy

11 November 2018 33	Ordabasy	1 – 0	Atyrau	Shymkent
15:00 (UTC+6)	Mehanović 15'	Report	A.Rodionov (yellow card) 86'; Adeniji (yellow card) 87'	Stadium: Kazhymukan Munaitpasov Stadium; Attendance: 2,700; Referee: Grigory Moskovchenko

==== League table ====
Pos	Team	Pld	W	D	L	GF	GA	GD	Pts	Qualification or relegation
2	Kairat	33	19	5	9	60	33	+27	62	Qualification for the Europa League first qualifying round (Note: Since the winners of 2018 Kazakhstan Cup, Kairat, qualified for European competition based on their league position, the spot awarded to the Cup winner (Europa League first qualifying round) was passed to the next best-placed team (the fourth-placed team).)
3	Tobol	33	15	8	10	36	30	+6	53	Qualification for the Europa League first qualifying round
4	Ordabasy	33	13	7	13	38	44	−6	46	Qualification for the Europa League first qualifying round
5	Kaisar	33	11	12	10	35	31	+4	45	
6	Zhetysu	33	11	10	12	36	40	−4	43	

Source: UEFA, Soccerway
Rules for classification: 1) Points; 2) Goal difference; 3) Matches won; 4) Goals scored; 5) Away goals scored; 6) Head-to-head points; 7) Head-to-head matches won; 8) Head-to-head goal difference; 9) Head-to-head goals scored; 10) Head-to-head away goals scored; 11) Draw.

=== Kazakhstan Cup ===
18 April 2018 Last 16	Kyran	0 – 6	Ordabasy	Shymkent
16:00 (UTC+6)	V.Sedelnikov (red card) 22'; S.Turekhanov (yellow card) 72'	Report	V.Li 11', 69' (yellow card) 36'; S.Shamshi (yellow card) 21'; M.Tolebek 23', 51'; U.Zhaksybaev (yellow card) 39'; Ashirbekov 48'; Jighauri 82'	Stadium: Kazhymukan Munaitpasov Stadium; Attendance: 600; Referee: Georgy Chekhovsky

23 May 2018 Quarterfinal	Ordabasy	1 – 1 (a.e.t.)	Kairat	Shymkent
18:00 (UTC+6)	Abiken 50' (o.g.); Fontanello (yellow card) 53'; Spahija (yellow card) 90+3'; U.Zhaksybaev (yellow card) 111'	Report	Kuat (yellow card) 22'; Paragulgov (yellow card) 34'; Vorogovskiy 45'; A.Sokolenko (yellow card) 65'; Sarsenov (yellow card) 85'; Pokatilov (yellow card) 90+4'; Alip (yellow card) 101'; A.Shushenachev (yellow card) 115'	Stadium: Kazhymukan Munaitpasov Stadium; Attendance: 4,000; Referee: Timur Kumashev

== Squad statistics ==
As of match played 11 November 2018

=== Appearances and goals ===
No.	Pos	Nat	Player	Total		Premier League		Kazakhstan Cup	
No.	Pos	Nat	Player	Apps	Goals	Apps	Goals	Apps	Goals
1	GK	(Kazakhstan) KAZ	Bekhan Shayzada	5	0	5	0	0	0
5	DF	(Kazakhstan) KAZ	Damir Dautov	10	0	8+2	0	0	0
6	MF	(Kazakhstan) KAZ	Ular Zhaksybaev	16	0	10+4	0	2	0
7	FW	(Serbia) SRB	Nemanja Kojić	13	3	6+7	3	0	0
8	DF	(Kazakhstan) KAZ	Temirlan Erlanov	17	4	17	4	0	0
9	FW	(Kazakhstan) KAZ	Vitali Li	21	2	5+15	0	1	2
10	MF	(Kazakhstan) KAZ	Kairat Ashirbekov	5	1	0+3	0	1+1	1
11	MF	(Ukraine) UKR	Kyrylo Kovalchuk	31	0	29+1	0	1	0
14	MF	(Kazakhstan) KAZ	Samat Shamshi	17	0	6+9	0	2	0
17	DF	(Kazakhstan) KAZ	Mardan Tolebek	31	2	29+1	0	1	2
19	FW	(Bosnia and Herzegovina) BIH	Mirzad Mehanović	13	1	10+3	1	0	0
21	MF	(Kazakhstan) KAZ	Yerkebulan Tungyshbayev	34	5	31+1	5	2	0
22	MF	(Senegal) SEN	Abdoulaye Diakate	30	7	28+1	7	1	0
27	MF	(Kazakhstan) KAZ	Timur Dosmagambetov	32	3	28+2	3	2	0
29	DF	(Argentina) ARG	Pablo Fontanello	32	0	31	0	1	0
33	MF	(Russia) RUS	Nikita Bocharov	34	2	27+5	2	2	0
34	GK	(Kazakhstan) KAZ	Zhasur Narzikulov	24	0	21+1	0	2	0
39	DF	(France) FRA	Helton	12	0	12	0	0	0
70	MF	(Croatia) CRO	Luka Muženjak	8	0	3+5	0	0	0
71	FW	(Kazakhstan) KAZ	Zhasulan Moldakaraev	14	4	11+3	4	0	0
77	DF	(Kazakhstan) KAZ	Talgat Adyrbekov	3	0	1+1	0	0+1	0
91	FW	(Kazakhstan) KAZ	Sergei Khizhnichenko	4	0	2+2	0	0	0
Players away from Ordabasy on loan:
Players who left Ordabasy during the season:
7	MF	(Argentina) ARG	Facundo Bertoglio	14	1	11+3	1	0	0
18	FW	(Kazakhstan) KAZ	Bekzhan Abdrakhman	2	0	0+1	0	0+1	0
31	MF	(Georgia (country)) GEO	Jaba Jighauri	15	4	2+11	3	1+1	1
44	DF	(Croatia) CRO	Hrvoje Spahija	16	0	14	0	2	0
70	FW	(Uzbekistan) UZB	Ivan Nagaev	16	3	9+6	3	1	0
95	FW	(Kazakhstan) KAZ	Alisher Suley	4	0	0+3	0	0+1	0
99	GK	(Kazakhstan) KAZ	David Loria	7	0	7	0	0	0

=== Goal scorers ===
Place	Position	Nation	Number	Name	Premier League	Kazakhstan Cup	Total
1	MF	(Senegal)	22	Abdoulaye Diakate	7	0	7
2	MF	(Kazakhstan)	21	Yerkebulan Tungyshbayev	5	0	5
3	DF	(Kazakhstan)	8	Temirlan Erlanov	4	0	4
3	FW	(Kazakhstan)	71	Zhasulan Moldakaraev	4	0	4
3	MF	(Georgia (country))	31	Jaba Jighauri	3	1	4
6	FW	(Uzbekistan)	70	Ivan Nagaev	3	0	3
6	MF	(Kazakhstan)	27	Timur Dosmagambetov	3	0	3
6	FW	(Serbia)	7	Nemanja Kojić	3	0	3
6				Own goal	2	1	3
10	MF	(Russia)	33	Nikita Bocharov	2	0	2
10	FW	(Kazakhstan)	9	Vitali Li	0	2	2
10	DF	(Kazakhstan)	17	Mardan Tolebek	0	2	2
12	MF	(Argentina)	7	Facundo Bertoglio	1	0	1
12	FW	(Bosnia and Herzegovina)	19	Mirzad Mehanović	1	0	1
12	MF	(Kazakhstan)	10	Kairat Ashirbekov	0	1	1
				TOTALS	38	7	45

=== Disciplinary record ===
Number	Nation	Position	Name	Premier League		Kazakhstan Cup		Total	
Number	Nation	Position	Name	Booked	Sent off (straight red)	Booked	Sent off (straight red)	Booked	Sent off (straight red)
1	(Kazakhstan)	GK	Bekhan Shayzada	1	0	0	0	1	0
5	(Kazakhstan)	DF	Damir Dautov	4	0	0	0	4	0
6	(Kazakhstan)	MF	Ular Zhaksybaev	4	0	2	0	6	0
7	(Serbia)	FW	Nemanja Kojić	2	0	0	0	2	0
8	(Kazakhstan)	DF	Temirlan Erlanov	4	0	0	0	4	0
9	(Kazakhstan)	FW	Vitali Li	2	0	1	0	3	0
10	(Kazakhstan)	MF	Kairat Ashirbekov	1	0	0	0	1	0
11	(Ukraine)	MF	Kyrylo Kovalchuk	3	0	1	0	4	0
14	(Kazakhstan)	MF	Samat Shamshi	2	0	1	0	3	0
17	(Kazakhstan)	DF	Mardan Tolebek	4	0	0	0	4	0
19	(Bosnia and Herzegovina)	FW	Mirzad Mehanović	1	0	0	0	1	0
21	(Kazakhstan)	MF	Yerkebulan Tungyshbayev	1	0	0	0	1	0
22	(Senegal)	MF	Abdoulaye Diakate	8	0	0	0	8	0
27	(Kazakhstan)	MF	Timur Dosmagambetov	7	0	0	0	7	0
29	(Argentina)	DF	Pablo Fontanello	4	0	1	0	5	0
34	(Kazakhstan)	GK	Zhasur Narzikulov	1	0	0	0	1	0
39	(France)	DF	Helton	1	0	0	0	1	0
70	(Croatia)	MF	Luka Muženjak	2	1	0	0	2	1
71	(Kazakhstan)	FW	Zhasulan Moldakaraev	4	0	0	0	4	0
77	(Kazakhstan)	DF	Talgat Adyrbekov	1	0	0	0	1	0
Players who left Ordabasy during the season:
7	(Argentina)	MF	Facundo Bertoglio	4	0	0	0	4	0
31	(Georgia (country))	MF	Jaba Jighauri	2	0	0	0	2	0
44	(Croatia)	DF	Hrvoje Spahija	4	1	1	0	5	1
70	(Uzbekistan)	FW	Ivan Nagaev	4	0	0	0	4	0
			TOTALS	71	2	6	0	77	2
