= 2018 FC Akzhayik season =

FC Akzhayik
2018 season
- Chairman: Zheksenbai Kusainov
- Manager: Volodymyr Mazyar (until 15 May)
- Stadium: Petr Atoyan Stadium
- Kazakhstan Premier League: 12th
- Kazakhstan Cup: Last 16 vs Atyrau
- Top goalscorer: League: Malick Mané (9); All: Malick Mané (9)
Home colours	Away colours

The 2018 FC Akzhayik season is the club's 10th season in the Kazakhstan Premier League, the highest tier of association football in Kazakhstan, and their third since 2010. They will also participate in the Kazakhstan Cup.

== Squad ==
As of 31 July 2018

Note: Flags indicate national team as defined under FIFA eligibility rules; some limited exceptions apply. Players may hold more than one non-FIFA nationality.

No.	Pos.	Nation	Player
1	GK	(Kazakhstan) KAZ	Serhiy Tkachuk
3	MF	(Croatia) CRO	Denis Glavina
4	DF	(Kazakhstan) KAZ	Vladimir Pokatilov
5	MF	(Kazakhstan) KAZ	Ivan Antipov
6	DF	(Kazakhstan) KAZ	Sergey Keyler
7	FW	(Senegal) SEN	Malick Mané
8	MF	(Kazakhstan) KAZ	Shyngys Saparbekuly
9	FW	(Kazakhstan) KAZ	Kenesbay Shubayev
10	MF	(Kazakhstan) KAZ	Yerkebulan Nurgaliyev
11	FW	(Kazakhstan) KAZ	Yedige Oralbai
12	DF	(Kazakhstan) KAZ	Erkin Tapalov
13	DF	(Kazakhstan) KAZ	Miram Sapanov

No.	Pos.	Nation	Player
14	DF	(Kazakhstan) KAZ	Bauyrzhan Omarov
17	MF	(Ukraine) UKR	Andriy Tkachuk
18	DF	(Kazakhstan) KAZ	Ruslan Khairov
19	MF	(Kazakhstan) KAZ	Azat Ersalimov
20	DF	(Kazakhstan) KAZ	Auez Baltabek
23	MF	(Ukraine) UKR	Ihor Khudobyak
24	DF	(Ukraine) UKR	Ambrosiy Chachua
25	FW	(Latvia) LVA	Artūrs Karašausks
30	DF	(Kazakhstan) KAZ	Alibek Sakenov
66	GK	(Ukraine) UKR	Yevhen Borovyk
77	DF	(Kazakhstan) KAZ	Berik Shaikhov
87	DF	(Ukraine) UKR	Serhiy Basov

== Transfers ==
=== Winter ===
In: Note: Flags indicate national team as defined under FIFA eligibility rules; some limited exceptions apply. Players may hold more than one non-FIFA nationality.

No.	Pos.	Nation	Player
1	GK	(Kazakhstan) KAZ	Serhiy Tkachuk
3	DF	(Ukraine) UKR	Oleksandr Volovyk (from (Kazakhstan) Aktobe)
6	DF	(Kazakhstan) KAZ	Sergey Keyler (from (Kazakhstan) Okzhetpes)
7	FW	(Senegal) SEN	Malick Mané (from (Kazakhstan) Taraz)
9	FW	(Kazakhstan) KAZ	Samit Chulagov (loan return from (Kazakhstan) Makhtaaral)
10	MF	(Kazakhstan) KAZ	Yerkebulan Nurgaliyev (from (Kazakhstan) Okzhetpes)
11	FW	(Kazakhstan) KAZ	Yedige Oralbai (from (Kazakhstan) Makhtaaral)
14	DF	(Kazakhstan) KAZ	Bauyrzhan Omarov (from (Kazakhstan) Kaisar)
17	MF	(Ukraine) UKR	Andriy Tkachuk (from (Ukraine) Vorskla Poltava)
23	MF	(Ukraine) UKR	Ihor Khudobyak (from (Ukraine) Karpaty Lviv)
44	DF	(Ukraine) UKR	Yuriy Putrash
45	FW	(Ukraine) UKR	Aderinsola Eseola (loan from (Ukraine) Zirka Kropyvnytskyi)
66	GK	(Ukraine) UKR	Yevhen Borovyk (from (Bulgaria) Cherno More)
77	DF	(Kazakhstan) KAZ	Berik Shaikhov (from (Kazakhstan) Astana)
87	DF	(Ukraine) UKR	Serhiy Basov (from (Ukraine) Oleksandriya)
—	MF	(Kazakhstan) KAZ	Oleg Nedashkovsky (from (Kazakhstan) Okzhetpes)

Out: Note: Flags indicate national team as defined under FIFA eligibility rules; some limited exceptions apply. Players may hold more than one non-FIFA nationality.

No.	Pos.	Nation	Player
6	MF	(Montenegro) MNE	Jovan Nikolić (to (Montenegro) Mladost Podgorica)
10	MF	(Colombia) COL	Jhoan Arenas (to (Venezuela) Puerto Cabello)
11	FW	(Montenegro) MNE	Marko Đurović (to (Montenegro) Lovćen)
12	MF	(Kazakhstan) KAZ	Konstantin Zarechny
14	MF	(Kazakhstan) KAZ	Alibek Ayaganov (to (Kazakhstan) Kyzylzhar)
15	DF	(Kazakhstan) KAZ	Dmitry Shmidt (to (Kazakhstan) Irtysh Pavlodar)
16	MF	(Paraguay) PAR	Freddy Coronel (to (Kazakhstan) Kyzylzhar)
27	DF	(Kazakhstan) KAZ	Andrey Shabaev (to (Kazakhstan) Kyzylzhar)
28	MF	(Kazakhstan) KAZ	Yuriy Pertsukh (to (Kazakhstan) Astana)
30	MF	(Croatia) CRO	Denis Glavina (to (Kazakhstan) Zhetysu)
33	GK	(Kazakhstan) KAZ	Vyacheslav Kotlyar (to (Kazakhstan) Tobol)
55	MF	(Serbia) SRB	Predrag Govedarica (to (Kazakhstan) Taraz)

=== Summer ===
In: Note: Flags indicate national team as defined under FIFA eligibility rules; some limited exceptions apply. Players may hold more than one non-FIFA nationality.

No.	Pos.	Nation	Player
3	MF	(Croatia) CRO	Denis Glavina (from (Kazakhstan) Zhetysu)
9	FW	(Kazakhstan) KAZ	Kenesbay Shubayev (from (Kazakhstan) Makhtaaral)
24	DF	(Ukraine) UKR	Ambrosiy Chachua (from (Ukraine) Karpaty Lviv)
25	FW	(Latvia) LVA	Artūrs Karašausks (from (Latvia) Liepāja)
88	FW	(Ivory Coast) CIV	Idrissa Kouyaté (from (Lebanon) Al-Ahed)
—	MF	(Kazakhstan) KAZ	Abay Zhunusov (from (Kazakhstan) Astana)

Out: Note: Flags indicate national team as defined under FIFA eligibility rules; some limited exceptions apply. Players may hold more than one non-FIFA nationality.

No.	Pos.	Nation	Player
3	DF	(Ukraine) UKR	Oleksandr Volovyk (to (Ukraine) Podillya Khmelnytskyi)
44	DF	(Ukraine) UKR	Yuriy Putrash
45	FW	(Ukraine) UKR	Aderinsola Eseola (loan return to (Ukraine) Zirka Kropyvnytskyi)
88	FW	(Ivory Coast) CIV	Idrissa Kouyaté

== Competitions ==
=== Premier League ===
==== Results summary ====
Overall								Home						Away					
Pld	W	D	L	GF	GA	GD	Pts	W	D	L	GF	GA	GD	W	D	L	GF	GA	GD
30	7	9	14	30	39	−9	30	5	6	4	18	12	+6	2	3	10	12	27	−15

Last updated: 21 October 2018.
Source: See Results

==== Results by round ====
Round	1	2	3	4	5	6	7	8	9	10	11	12	13	14	15	16	17	18	19	20	21	22	23	24	25	26	27	28	29	30	31	32	33
Ground	A	A	H	A	H	A	H	A	H	A	H	H	H	A	H	A	H	A	H	A	A	A	H	A	A	H	H	A	H	A	H	A	A
Result	L	D	W	L	W	D	D	L	D	L	W	W	D	L	L	L	L	W	W	L	D	D	D	L	W	L	L	L	D	L	L	L	L
Position	12	9	8	9	6	6	6	6	6	7	6	4	5	6	6	7	8	6	5	6	8	7	8	8	8	8	8	9	9	10	12	12	12

Source: See Results
A = Away; H = Home; W = Win; D = Draw; L = Loss

==== Results ====
11 March 2018 1	Astana	3 – 0	Akzhayik	Astana
16:00 (UTC+6)	Tomasov 9'; Muzhikov (yellow card) 50' (goal) 80'; Malyi 75'; B.Zaynutdinov (yellow card) 85'	Report	Eseola (yellow card) 56'	Stadium: Astana Arena; Attendance: 2,000; Referee: Bakhyt Kyzylbaev

17 March 2018 2	Kaisar	1 – 1	Akzhayik	Kyzylorda
15:00 (UTC+6)	I.Amirseitov (yellow card) 17'; Kamara (yellow card) 26'; Korobkin (yellow card) 52'; Coureur 54'; M.Islamkulov (yellow card) 77'	Report	I.Antipov (yellow card) 28'; Nurgaliyev 73'; M.Sapanov (yellow card) 85'	Stadium: Gani Muratbayev Stadium; Attendance: 3,000; Referee: Furkat Atajanov

31 March 2018 3	Akzhayik	1 – 0	Irtysh Pavlodar	Aksay
15:00 (UTC+6)	I.Antipov 81'	Report	N.Kalmykov (yellow card) 11'	Stadium: Karaşıganak Stadium; Attendance: 1,200; Referee: Aleksei Bobrov

7 April 2018 4	Kairat	3 – 0	Akzhayik	Almaty
17:00 (UTC+6)	Isael 19' (yellow card) 80'; Silveira 33'; Zhukov 81'	Report	Nurgaliyev (yellow card) 6'; A.Tkachuk (yellow card) 60'	Stadium: Central Stadium; Attendance: 7,100; Referee: Bakhyt Kyzylbaev

13 April 2018 5	Akzhayik	4 – 1	Ordabasy	Aksay
15:00 (UTC+6)	I.Antipov 13'; Nurgaliyev 17' (pen.); E.Tapalov (yellow card) 21'; Eseola 44', 78'	Report	Spahija (red card) 26'; D.Dautov (yellow card) 31'; Dosmagambetov 38' (yellow card) 56'; Nagaev (yellow card) 54'	Stadium: Karaşıganak Stadium; Attendance: 1,200; Referee: Igor Chesnokov

22 April 2018 6	Tobol	1 – 1	Akzhayik	Kostanay
15:00 (UTC+6)	Nurgaliev (yellow card) 67'; Nusserbayev 70'; Kankava (yellow card) 71'	Report	Eseola 12'; Nurgaliyev (yellow card) 25' (yellow-red card) 33'; A.Ersalimov (yellow card) 56'	Stadium: Zatobolets Stadion; Attendance: 2,000; Referee: Timur Kumashev

28 April 2018 7	Akzhayik	1 – 1	Shakhter Karagandy	Aksay
15:00 (UTC+6)	B.Shaikhov 26'; Borovyk (yellow card) 77'	Report	Tkachuk (yellow card) 28'; Valadzko 55'; Subotić (yellow card) 84'	Stadium: Karaşıganak Stadium; Attendance: 800; Referee: Denis Izmailov

5 May 2018 8	Kyzylzhar	2 – 1	Akzhayik	Petropavl
16:00 (UTC+6)	Grigalashvili 32' (pen.); Gogua 36'; T.Muldinov (yellow card) 74'	Report	Borovyk (yellow card) 31'; B.Omarov (yellow card) 58'; A.Ersalimov 90+3'	Stadium: Karasay Stadium; Attendance: 2,000; Referee: Artyom Kuchin

9 May 2018 9	Akzhayik	1 – 1	Atyrau	Oral
15:00 (UTC+6)	Eseola 64'; M.Sapanov (yellow card) 78'; Khudobyak (yellow card) 80'	Report	E.Abdrakhmanov 10'; Živković (yellow card) 28'; R.Dzumatov (yellow card) 77'; R.Esatov (red card) 78'	Stadium: Petr Atoyan Stadium; Attendance: 3,000; Referee: Aydin Rakhimbayev

13 May 2018 10	Aktobe	5 – 3	Akzhayik	Aktobe
19:00 (UTC+6)	B.Kairov 27'; Pizzelli 42', 67'; Reynaldo 45', 56'	Report	Khudobyak (yellow card) 3'; Eseola (yellow card) 67' (goal) 75'; Basov 73'; Mané 79'	Stadium: Central Stadium; Attendance: 11,000; Referee: Marat Iskakov

19 May 2018 11	Akzhayik	2 – 0	Zhetysu	Oral
18:00 (UTC+6)	I.Antipov (yellow card) 42'; Eseola 67', 80'	Report	L.Kasradze (yellow card) 62'	Stadium: Petr Atoyan Stadium; Attendance: 1,500; Referee: Daniyar Sakhi

23 May 2018 22	Akzhayik	3 – 0	Astana	Oral
18:00 (UTC+6)	Khudobyak 4'; E.Tapalov (yellow card) 39'; M.Sapanov (yellow card) 47'; Mané 54'; Eseola 85' (yellow card) 86'	Report	Mayewski (yellow card) 15'; Beisebekov (yellow card) 50'	Stadium: Petr Atoyan Stadium; Attendance: 2,500; Referee: Igor Chesnokov

27 May 2018 12	Akzhayik	0 – 0	Kaisar	Oral
18:00 (UTC+6)	Basov (yellow card) 37'; Tkachuk (yellow card) 61'; Eseola (yellow card) 71'	Report	Zhangylyshbay (yellow card) 37'; Graf (yellow card) 55'	Stadium: Petr Atoyan Stadium; Attendance: 3,000; Referee: Grigory Moskovchenko

31 May 2018 13	Irtysh Pavlodar	2 – 0	Akzhayik	Pavlodar
19:00 (UTC+6)	Shestakov (yellow card) 8'; Stamenković 23'; Popadiuc (yellow card) 26'; Salami 39' (pen.)	Report		Stadium: Central Stadium; Attendance: 3,000; Referee: Arman Ismuratov

17 June 2018 14	Akzhayik	1 – 2	Kairat	Oral
19:00 (UTC+6)	E.Tapalov (yellow card) 21'; Mané 86'	Report	Arshavin 42' (yellow card) 85'; Iličević (yellow card) 70'; Silveira (yellow card) 80'	Stadium: Petr Atoyan Stadium; Attendance: 3,000; Referee: Furkat Atajanov

23 June 2018 15	Ordabasy	2 – 1	Akzhayik	Shymkent
19:00 (UTC+6)	Tungyshbayev 44'; Jighauri (yellow card) 62'; Nagaev 77'	Report	Mané 39' (yellow card) 83'	Stadium: Kazhymukan Munaitpasov Stadium; Attendance: 1,300; Referee: Saken Bayimbet

1 July 2018 16	Akzhayik	1 – 3	Tobol	Oral
18:00 (UTC+6)	R.Khairov (yellow card) 29'; M.Sapanov 90+4'	Report	S.Zharynbetov (yellow card) 8'; Nusserbayev 56', 63'; Kankava 88'	Stadium: Petr Atoyan Stadium; Attendance: 1,000; Referee: Igor Chesnokov

7 July 2018 17	Shakhter Karagandy	1 – 2	Akzhayik	Karaganda
19:00 (UTC+6)	Valadzko (yellow card) 66'; Kojašević 90+3'	Report	M.Sapanov 19'; Mané 82'	Stadium: Shakhter Stadium; Attendance: 500; Referee: Arman Ismuratov

14 July 2018 18	Akzhayik	2 – 0	Kyzylzhar	Oral
20:00 (UTC+6)	Mané 2', 70'	Report	Delić (yellow card) 80'	Stadium: Petr Atoyan Stadium; Attendance: 500; Referee: Bagdat Abdullaev

21 July 2018 19	Atyrau	2 – 0	Akzhayik	Atyrau
20:30 (UTC+6)	Zyankovich 24'; Sergienko (yellow card) 43'; Barbarić (yellow card) 49'; Sikimić 55'; Adeniji (yellow card) 62'; D.Kayralliyev (yellow card) 82'	Report	Mané (yellow card) 43'; B.Shaikhov (yellow card) 64'; Khudobyak (yellow card) 67'	Stadium: Munaishy Stadium; Attendance: 2,500; Referee: Denis Izmailov

28 July 2018 20	Akzhayik	1 – 1	Aktobe	Oral
20:00 (UTC+6)	I.Antipov (yellow card) 32'; Glavina (yellow card) 45+2'; E.Tapalov (yellow card) 47'; Tkachuk 86'	Report	A.Shurigin (yellow card) 37'; Maurice (yellow card) 41' (goal) 43'	Stadium: Petr Atoyan Stadium; Attendance: 3,500; Referee: Aydin Rakhimbayev

4 August 2018 21	Zhetysu	1 – 1	Akzhayik	Taldıqorğan
18:00 (UTC+6)	R.Jalilov 34'; Hromțov (yellow card) 36'	Report	Glavina (yellow card) 39'; B.Shaikhov (yellow card) 56'; Karašausks 70'	Stadium: Zhetysu Stadium; Attendance: 2,000; Referee: Aleksandr Gauzer

18 August 2018 23	Akzhayik	0 – 0	Aktobe	Oral
19:00 (UTC+6)	Basov (yellow card) 74'; Khudobyak (yellow card) 79'; M.Sapanov (yellow card) 79'; Nurgaliyev (yellow card) 90+3'	Report	Maurice (yellow card) 90+3'	Stadium: Petr Atoyan Stadium; Attendance: 1,500; Referee: Artyom Kuchin

25 August 2018 24	Ordabasy	1 – 0	Akzhayik	Shymkent
20:00 (UTC+6)	B.Shaikhov 28' (o.g.); Moldakaraev (yellow card) 40'; Dosmagambetov (yellow card) 70'; Tungyshbayev (yellow card) 86'	Report	Glavina (yellow card) 12'; Basov (yellow card) 52'	Stadium: Kazhymukan Munaitpasov Stadium; Attendance: 2,700; Referee: Timur Kumashev

16 September 2018 26	Kairat	0 – 1	Akzhayik	Almaty
19:00 (UTC+6)	Bateau (yellow card) 27'; Isael (yellow card) 28'; Eseola (yellow card) 90+1'	Report	Nurgaliyev 76'; E.Tapalov (yellow card) 90+4'	Stadium: Central Stadium; Attendance: 4,000; Referee: Zhandos Abzhan

23 September 2018 27	Akzhayik	1 – 2	Astana	Oral
18:00 (UTC+6)	Basov (yellow card) 23'; Karašausks 37'	Report	Richard 23' (pen.); Shchotkin 26'; Beisebekov (yellow card) 38'; Muzhikov (yellow card) 69'	Stadium: Petr Atoyan Stadium; Attendance: 3,500; Referee: Askhat Abdanbayev

26 September 2018 25	Akzhayik	0 – 1	Tobol	Oral
18:00 (UTC+6)	Chachua (yellow card) 57'	Report	Dmitrenko (yellow card) 26'; Kankava 81'; S.Zharynbetov (yellow card) 88'	Stadium: Petr Atoyan Stadium; Attendance: 800; Referee: Daniyar Sakhi

30 September 2018 28	Shakhter Karagandy	1 – 0	Akzhayik	Karaganda
15:00 (UTC+6)	Chichulin 31'; Harutyunyan (yellow card) 89'	Report	Glavina (yellow card) 35'	Stadium: Shakhter Stadium; Attendance: 2,000; Referee: Sergey Gorokhovodatskiy

6 October 2018 29	Akzhayik	0 – 0	Kyzylzhar	Oral
17:00 (UTC+6)	E.Tapalov (yellow card) 20'; Basov (yellow card) 84'	Report	Stetsenko (yellow card) 22'; Popkhadze (yellow card) 45'; V.Gunchenko (yellow card) 81'; E.Nabiyev (yellow card) 90+7'	Stadium: Petr Atoyan Stadium; Attendance: 800; Referee: Denis Izmailov

21 October 2018 30	Atyrau	2 – 1	Akzhayik	Atyrau
16:00 (UTC+6)	Kubík (yellow card) 38'; Adeniji 40', 58'; D.Zhalmukan (yellow card) 54'; A.Rodionov (yellow card) 87'	Report	Mané 30'; E.Tapalov (yellow card) 45'; M.Sapanov (yellow card) 50'; Chachua (yellow card) 67'; Basov (yellow card) 84'	Stadium: Munaishy Stadium; Attendance: 3,000; Referee: Daniyar Sakhi

27 October 2018 31	Akzhayik	0 – 4	Kaisar	Oral
16:30 (UTC+6)	Chachua (yellow card) 37'; A.Ersalimov (yellow card) 57'	Report	Lamanje (yellow card) 32'; Punoševac 38'; Arzhanov 48'; Graf (yellow card) 55'; Coureur 60'; Narzildaev (yellow card) 67'; Zyankovich 90+3'	Stadium: Petr Atoyan Stadium; Attendance: 1,000; Referee: Artyom Kuchin

3 November 2018 32	Irtysh Pavlodar	2 – 0	Akzhayik	Pavlodar
15:00 (UTC+6)	Seco (yellow card) 50'; Shabalin 62'; Camará 80'	Report	B.Shaikhov (yellow card) 30'; Chachua (yellow card) 85'; Basov (yellow card) 88'	Stadium: Central Stadium; Attendance: 2,000; Referee: Timur Kumashev

11 November 2018 33	Zhetysu	3 – 1	Akzhayik	Taldıqorğan
15:00 (UTC+6)	E.Tapalov 6' (o.g.); Mukhutdinov 67'; Ibraev 90+1'	Report	Basov (yellow card) 14'; Mané 79'	Stadium: Zhetysu Stadium; Attendance: 1,500; Referee: Daniyar Sakhi

==== League table ====
Pos	Team	Pld	W	D	L	GF	GA	GD	Pts	Qualification or relegation
8	Shakhter Karagandy	33	8	12	13	29	36	−7	36	
9	Atyrau	33	9	9	15	34	47	−13	36	
10	Irtysh Pavlodar (O)	33	10	5	18	28	45	−17	35	Qualification for the relegation play-offs
11	Kyzylzhar (R)	33	10	5	18	27	48	−21	35	Relegation to the Kazakhstan First Division
12	Akzhayik (R)	33	7	9	17	31	48	−17	30	Relegation to the Kazakhstan First Division

Source: UEFA, Soccerway
Rules for classification: 1) Points; 2) Goal difference; 3) Matches won; 4) Goals scored; 5) Away goals scored; 6) Head-to-head points; 7) Head-to-head matches won; 8) Head-to-head goal difference; 9) Head-to-head goals scored; 10) Head-to-head away goals scored; 11) Draw.
(O) Play-off winners; (R) Relegated

=== Kazakhstan Cup ===
18 April 2018 Last 16	Akzhayik	0 – 1	Atyrau	Aksay
17:00 (UTC+6)	E.Tapalov (yellow card) 65'; M.Sapanov (yellow card) 71'	Report	Ablitarov (yellow card) 27'; Maksimović 66' (pen.); Chichulin (yellow card) 74'	Stadium: Karaşıganak Stadium; Attendance: 1,000; Referee: Askhat Abdanbayev

== Squad statistics ==
As of match played 11 November 2018

=== Appearances and goals ===
No.	Pos	Nat	Player	Total		Premier League		Kazakhstan Cup	
No.	Pos	Nat	Player	Apps	Goals	Apps	Goals	Apps	Goals
1	GK	(Kazakhstan) KAZ	Serhiy Tkachuk	12	0	11+1	0	0	0
3	MF	(Croatia) CRO	Denis Glavina	13	0	10+3	0	0	0
4	DF	(Kazakhstan) KAZ	Vladimir Pokatilov	14	0	1+12	0	1	0
5	MF	(Kazakhstan) KAZ	Ivan Antipov	30	2	24+6	2	0	0
6	DF	(Kazakhstan) KAZ	Sergey Keyler	1	0	0+1	0	0	0
7	FW	(Senegal) SEN	Malick Mané	28	9	19+8	9	1	0
10	MF	(Kazakhstan) KAZ	Yerkebulan Nurgaliyev	28	3	15+13	3	0	0
11	FW	(Kazakhstan) KAZ	Yedige Oralbai	5	0	1+3	0	0+1	0
12	DF	(Kazakhstan) KAZ	Erkin Tapalov	33	0	31+1	0	1	0
13	MF	(Kazakhstan) KAZ	Miram Sapanov	33	2	31+1	2	1	0
14	DF	(Kazakhstan) KAZ	Bauyrzhan Omarov	10	0	2+7	0	1	0
17	MF	(Ukraine) UKR	Andriy Tkachuk	32	1	30+1	1	1	0
18	DF	(Kazakhstan) KAZ	Ruslan Khairov	22	0	17+4	0	1	0
19	MF	(Kazakhstan) KAZ	Azat Ersalimov	33	1	32	1	1	0
23	MF	(Ukraine) UKR	Ihor Khudobyak	30	1	22+7	1	1	0
24	DF	(Ukraine) UKR	Ambrosiy Chachua	11	0	11	0	0	0
25	FW	(Latvia) LVA	Artūrs Karašausks	14	2	6+8	2	0	0
30	DF	(Kazakhstan) KAZ	Alibek Sakenov	3	0	0+2	0	0+1	0
66	GK	(Ukraine) UKR	Yevhen Borovyk	23	0	22	0	1	0
77	DF	(Kazakhstan) KAZ	Berik Shaikhov	34	1	31+2	1	1	0
87	DF	(Ukraine) UKR	Serhiy Basov	32	1	32	1	0	0
98	MF	(Kazakhstan) KAZ	Adilet Bolatov	2	0	0+1	0	0+1	0
Players away from Akzhayik on loan:
Players who left Akzhayik during the season:
3	DF	(Ukraine) UKR	Oleksandr Volovyk	1	0	1	0	0	0
44	DF	(Ukraine) UKR	Yuriy Putrash	3	0	3	0	0	0
45	FW	(Ukraine) UKR	Aderinsola Eseola	13	8	11+2	8	0	0
88	FW	(Ivory Coast) CIV	Idrissa Kouyaté	3	0	0+3	0	0	0

=== Goal scorers ===
Place	Position	Nation	Number	Name	Premier League	Kazakhstan Cup	Total
1	FW	(Senegal)	7	Malick Mané	9	0	9
2	FW	(Ukraine)	45	Aderinsola Eseola	8	0	8
3	MF	(Kazakhstan)	10	Yerkebulan Nurgaliyev	3	0	3
4	MF	(Kazakhstan)	5	Ivan Antipov	2	0	2
4	MF	(Kazakhstan)	13	Miram Sapanov	2	0	2
4	FW	(Latvia)	25	Artūrs Karašausks	2	0	2
7	DF	(Kazakhstan)	77	Berik Shaikhov	1	0	1
7	MF	(Kazakhstan)	19	Azat Ersalimov	1	0	1
7	DF	(Ukraine)	87	Serhiy Basov	1	0	1
7	MF	(Ukraine)	23	Ihor Khudobyak	1	0	1
7	MF	(Ukraine)	17	Andriy Tkachuk	1	0	1
				TOTALS	31	0	31

=== Disciplinary record ===
Number	Nation	Position	Name	Premier League		Kazakhstan Cup		Total	
Number	Nation	Position	Name	Booked	Sent off (straight red)	Booked	Sent off (straight red)	Booked	Sent off (straight red)
3	(Croatia)	DF	Denis Glavina	4	0	0	0	4	0
5	(Kazakhstan)	MF	Ivan Antipov	3	0	0	0	3	0
7	(Senegal)	FW	Malick Mané	2	0	0	0	2	0
10	(Kazakhstan)	MF	Yerkebulan Nurgaliyev	4	1	0	0	4	1
12	(Kazakhstan)	DF	Erkin Tapalov	7	0	1	0	8	0
13	(Kazakhstan)	DF	Miram Sapanov	5	0	1	0	6	0
14	(Kazakhstan)	DF	Bauyrzhan Omarov	1	0	0	0	1	0
17	(Ukraine)	MF	Andriy Tkachuk	2	0	0	0	2	0
18	(Kazakhstan)	DF	Ruslan Khairov	1	0	0	0	1	0
19	(Kazakhstan)	MF	Azat Ersalimov	2	0	0	0	2	0
23	(Ukraine)	MF	Ihor Khudobyak	4	0	0	0	4	0
24	(Ukraine)	DF	Ambrosiy Chachua	4	0	0	0	4	0
66	(Ukraine)	GK	Yevhen Borovyk	2	0	0	0	2	0
77	(Kazakhstan)	DF	Berik Shaikhov	3	0	0	0	3	0
87	(Ukraine)	DF	Serhiy Basov	8	0	0	0	8	0
Players who left Akzhayik during the season:
45	(Ukraine)	FW	Aderinsola Eseola	4	0	0	0	4	0
			TOTALS	56	1	2	0	58	1
