= 2018 FC Kyzylzhar season =

FC Kyzylzhar
2018 season
- Chairman: Loriya Grigoriy Otarovich
- Manager: Nikola Spasov
- Stadium: Karasai Stadium
Home colours	Away colours	Third colours

The 2018 FC Kyzylzhar season is the club's 12th season in the Kazakhstan Premier League, the highest tier of association football in Kazakhstan, and first since their relegation at the end of the 2009 season. Kyzylzhar will also play in the Kazakhstan Cup.

== Squad ==
As of 30 July 2018

Note: Flags indicate national team as defined under FIFA eligibility rules; some limited exceptions apply. Players may hold more than one non-FIFA nationality.

No.	Pos.	Nation	Player
1	GK	(Kazakhstan) KAZ	Anton Tsirin
2	DF	(Georgia (country)) GEO	Giorgi Popkhadze
3	DF	(Kazakhstan) KAZ	Bagdaulet Kozhabayev
4	DF	(Kazakhstan) KAZ	Karam Sultanov
5	MF	(Ukraine) UKR	Maksym Drachenko
7	FW	(Kazakhstan) KAZ	Timur Muldinov
8	FW	(Kazakhstan) KAZ	Dmitry Savchenko
10	MF	(Georgia (country)) GEO	Shota Grigalashvili
11	DF	(Kazakhstan) KAZ	Viktor Gunchenko
14	MF	(Kazakhstan) KAZ	Aslan Dzhanuzakov
15	MF	(Kazakhstan) KAZ	Elmar Nabiev
16	MF	(Paraguay) PAR	Freddy Coronel

No.	Pos.	Nation	Player
17	DF	(Kazakhstan) KAZ	Olzhas Altayev
18	FW	(The Gambia) GAM	Momodou Ceesay
21	MF	(Montenegro) MNE	Uroš Delić
22	MF	(Kazakhstan) KAZ	Ali Aliyev
25	DF	(Ukraine) UKR	Oleksandr Stetsenko
26	FW	(Serbia) SRB	Miroslav Lečić
27	DF	(Kazakhstan) KAZ	Andrey Shabaev
31	GK	(Kazakhstan) KAZ	Rustam Aydargaliyev
40	DF	(Kazakhstan) KAZ	Ildar Aitov
78	GK	(Kazakhstan) KAZ	Timurbek Zakirov
—	MF	(Kazakhstan) KAZ	Midat Galbaev
—	MF	(Kazakhstan) KAZ	Oleg Nedashkovsky

== Transfers ==
=== Winter ===
In: Note: Flags indicate national team as defined under FIFA eligibility rules; some limited exceptions apply. Players may hold more than one non-FIFA nationality.

No.	Pos.	Nation	Player
1	GK	(Kazakhstan) KAZ	Anton Tsirin (from (Kazakhstan) Irtysh Pavlodar)
2	DF	(Georgia (country)) GEO	Giorgi Popkhadze (from (Georgia (country)) Dila Gori)
3	DF	(Kazakhstan) KAZ	Aleksei Muldarov (from (Kazakhstan) Kaisar)
5	MF	(Georgia (country)) GEO	Gogita Gogua (from (Kazakhstan) Okzhetpes)
6	MF	(Kazakhstan) KAZ	Alibek Ayaganov (from (Kazakhstan) Akzhayik)
9	MF	(Kazakhstan) KAZ	Sergei Skorykh (from (Kazakhstan) Shakhter Karagandy)
10	MF	(Georgia (country)) GEO	Shota Grigalashvili (from (Uzbekistan) AGMK)
13	FW	(Serbia) SRB	Bratislav Punoševac (from (Moldova) Dacia Chișinău)
16	MF	(Paraguay) PAR	Freddy Coronel (from (Kazakhstan) Akzhayik)
21	MF	(Montenegro) MNE	Uroš Delić (from (Serbia) Borac Čačak)
25	DF	(Bulgaria) BUL	Mihail Venkov (from (Bulgaria) Slavia Sofia)
27	DF	(Kazakhstan) KAZ	Andrey Shabaev (from (Kazakhstan) Akzhayik)

Out: Note: Flags indicate national team as defined under FIFA eligibility rules; some limited exceptions apply. Players may hold more than one non-FIFA nationality.

No.	Pos.	Nation	Player
—	DF	(Mali) MLI	Mamoutou Coulibaly
—	DF	(Serbia) SRB	Nikola Tasic

=== Summer ===
In: Note: Flags indicate national team as defined under FIFA eligibility rules; some limited exceptions apply. Players may hold more than one non-FIFA nationality.

No.	Pos.	Nation	Player
5	MF	(Ukraine) UKR	Maksym Drachenko (from (Ukraine) Zirka Kropyvnytskyi)
18	FW	(The Gambia) GAM	Momodou Ceesay
25	DF	(Ukraine) UKR	Oleksandr Stetsenko
26	FW	(Serbia) SRB	Miroslav Lečić (from (Serbia) Metalac)
—	DF	(Kazakhstan) KAZ	Elmar Nabiev (from (Kazakhstan) Makhtaaral)
—	MF	(Kazakhstan) KAZ	Midat Galbaev (from (Kazakhstan) Irtysh Pavlodar)
—	MF	(Kazakhstan) KAZ	Oleg Nedashkovsky (from (Kazakhstan) Ekibastuz)

Out: Note: Flags indicate national team as defined under FIFA eligibility rules; some limited exceptions apply. Players may hold more than one non-FIFA nationality.

No.	Pos.	Nation	Player
3	DF	(Kazakhstan) KAZ	Aleksei Muldarov
5	MF	(Georgia (country)) GEO	Gogita Gogua (to (Georgia (country)) Dila Gori)
6	MF	(Kazakhstan) KAZ	Alibek Ayaganov
13	FW	(Serbia) SRB	Bratislav Punoševac (to (Kazakhstan) Kaisar)
15	DF	(Kazakhstan) KAZ	Georgiy Makayev
24	FW	(Bosnia and Herzegovina) BIH	Boško Stupić (to (Kazakhstan) Kyran)
25	DF	(Bulgaria) BUL	Mihail Venkov

== Competitions ==
=== Premier League ===
==== Results summary ====
Overall								Home						Away					
Pld	W	D	L	GF	GA	GD	Pts	W	D	L	GF	GA	GD	W	D	L	GF	GA	GD
33	10	5	18	27	48	−21	35	8	3	5	18	17	+1	2	2	13	9	31	−22

Last updated: 11 November 2018.
Source: See Results

==== Results by round ====
Round	1	2	3	4	5	6	7	8	9	10	11	12	13	14	15	16	17	18	19	20	21	22	23	24	25	26	27	28	29	30	31	32	33
Ground	A	A	H	A	H	H	H	A	H	A	H	A	H	A	H	A	A	H	A	A	H	A	A	A	A	H	H	A	H	A	H	H	A
Result	L	L	L	L	W	D	L	L	W	L	D	L	L	W	W	L	D	W	L	L	W	L	L	W	L	W	W	D	D	L	W	L	L
Position	8	10	11	11	10	10	10	10	8	11	10	11	12	10	8	11	11	8	9	10	9	10	11	11	11	10	8	8	9	10	8	11	11

Source: See Results
A = Away; H = Home; W = Win; D = Draw; L = Loss

==== Results ====
11 March 2018 1	Kairat	2 – 1	Kyzylzhar	Almaty
15:00 (UTC+6)	Silveira (yellow card) 28'; Isael 80'; Kuat (yellow card) 81'; Arshavin 87'	Report	Punoševac 26' (yellow card) 49'; Muldarov (yellow card) 56'; Aliyev (yellow card) 90+2'	Stadium: Central Stadium; Attendance: 7,500; Referee: Bolat Saryev

17 March 2018 2	Ordabasy	2 – 1	Kyzylzhar	Shymkent
15:00 (UTC+6)	Spahija (yellow card) 45'; Diakate 48' (pen.); Popkhadze 66' (o.g.); Nagaev (yellow card) 70'	Report	Gogua (yellow card) 10'; Punoševac (yellow card) 42'; T.Muldinov 45+1'; Muldarov (yellow card) 50'	Stadium: Kazhymukan Munaitpasov Stadium; Attendance: 3,000; Referee: Grigory Moskovchenko

1 April 2018 3	Kyzylzhar	1 – 2	Tobol	Petropavl
15:00 (UTC+6)	T.Muldinov 23'; Gogua (yellow card) 90+1'	Report	Darabayev (yellow card) 27'; Nusserbayev 53'; Fedin 79' (yellow card) 90+4'	Stadium: Karasay Stadium; Attendance: 6,000; Referee: Saken Bayimbet

7 April 2018 4	Shakhter Karagandy	2 – 1	Kyzylzhar	Temirtau
15:00 (UTC+6)	Kojašević 5'; Mihunov 9'; Y.Tarasov (yellow card) 51'	Report	Gogua (yellow card) 14'; D.Savchenko (yellow card) 45+1'; Stupić (yellow card) 57'; Popkhadze (yellow card) 90'; Punoševac 90+1'	Stadium: Metallurg Stadium; Attendance: 1,200; Referee: Ruslan Omarov

14 April 2018 5	Kyzylzhar	1 – 0	Zhetysu	Petropavl
15:00 (UTC+6)	Venkov (yellow card) 11'; Punoševac 26'; A.Ayaganov (yellow card) 90'	Report	Glavina (yellow card) 81'; R.Nurmugamet (yellow card) 89'	Stadium: Karasay Stadium; Attendance: 4,000; Referee: Aleksei Bobrov

22 April 2018 6	Kyzylzhar	1 – 1	Atyrau	Petropavl
15:00 (UTC+6)	Grigalashvili 24' (pen.); I.Aitov (yellow card) 55'; Muldarov (yellow card) 83'	Report	Khairullin (yellow card) 41'; Nane (yellow card) 44'; A.Nurybekov (yellow card) 73'; E.Abdrakhmanov 77'	Stadium: Karasay Stadium; Attendance: 4,000; Referee: Daniyar Sakhi

25 April 2018 19	Kyzylzhar	0 – 2	Astana	Petropavl
15:00 (UTC+6)	Coronel (yellow card) 43'; T.Muldinov (yellow card) 74'	Report	Malyi (yellow card) 50'; Aničić (yellow card) 70'; Twumasi 80', 90+3' (yellow card) 80'	Stadium: Karasai Stadium; Attendance: 3,000; Referee: Bagdat Abdullaev

29 April 2018 7	Aktobe	2 – 0	Kyzylzhar	Aktobe
17:00 (UTC+6)	B.Kairov (yellow card) 25'; Aimbetov 31'; R.Nurmukhametov (yellow card) 72'; Radin (yellow card) 74' (goal) 82'	Report	T.Muldinov (yellow card) 36'; V.Gunchenko (yellow card) 38'; Popkhadze (yellow card) 76'	Stadium: Central Stadium; Attendance: 11,000; Referee: Furkat Atajanov

5 May 2018 8	Kyzylzhar	2 – 1	Akzhayik	Petropavl
16:00 (UTC+6)	Grigalashvili 32' (pen.); Gogua 36'; T.Muldinov (yellow card) 74'	Report	Borovyk (yellow card) 31'; B.Omarov (yellow card) 58'; A.Ersalimov 90+3'	Stadium: Karasay Stadium; Attendance: 2,000; Referee: Artyom Kuchin

9 May 2018 9	Astana	2 – 0	Kyzylzhar	Astana
18:00 (UTC+6)	Postnikov (yellow card) 58'; Despotović 79'; Tomasov 82'	Report	O.Altayev (yellow card) 8'	Stadium: Astana Arena; Attendance: 2,500; Referee: Sergey Gorokhovodatskiy

13 May 2018 10	Kyzylzhar	0 – 0	Kaisar	Petropavl
16:00 (UTC+6)	Venkov (yellow card) 45+1'; K.Sultanov (yellow card) 53'	Report	Kamara (yellow card) 18' (yellow-red card) 90+4'; Lamanje (yellow card) 22'; I.Amirseitov (yellow card) 39'	Stadium: Karasay Stadium; Attendance: 4,000; Referee: Aleksandr Aliyev

19 May 2018 11	Irtysh Pavlodar	5 – 0	Kyzylzhar	Pavlodar
16:00 (UTC+6)	Shabalin 17', 28'; Stamenković 44'; V.Vomenko (yellow card) 57'; R.Yesimov (yellow card) 75'; Salami 83'; Popadiuc 90+3'	Report	A.Dzhanuzakov (yellow card) 16'; Grigalashvili (yellow card) 37'; Punoševac (yellow card) 41'; T.Muldinov (yellow card) 66'	Stadium: Central Stadium; Attendance: 2,500; Referee: Bolat Saryev

27 May 2018 12	Kyzylzhar	1 – 2	Ordabasy	Petropavl
16:00 (UTC+6)	Coronel 17' (yellow card) 57'; Delić (yellow card) 78'	Report	Spahija (yellow card) 36'; Fontanello (yellow card) 43'; Diakate 45'; U.Zhaksybaev (yellow card) 52'; Tungyshbayev 79'; S.Shamshi (yellow card) 90+4'	Stadium: Karasay Stadium; Attendance: 4,000; Referee: Denis Izmailov

31 May 2018 13	Tobol	0 – 1	Kyzylzhar	Kostanay
19:00 (UTC+6)	Turysbek (yellow card) 45'	Report	Punoševac 42'; I.Aitov (yellow card) 45+2'; T.Muldinov (yellow card) 82'; Tsirin (yellow card) 90+4'	Stadium: Central Stadium; Attendance: 4,000; Referee: Aydin Rakhimbayev

18 June 2018 14	Kyzylzhar	1 – 0	Shakhter Karagandy	Petropavl
17:00 (UTC+6)	T.Muldinov (yellow card) 40' (goal) 88'; Gogua (yellow card) 81'	Report	M.Gabyshev (yellow card) 42'; Mužek (yellow card) 80'	Stadium: Karasay Stadium; Attendance: 2,000; Referee: Bolat Karlibayev

23 June 2018 15	Zhetysu	2 – 1	Kyzylzhar	Taldıqorğan
18:00 (UTC+6)	Punoševac 13' (o.g.); Mawutor 90+3'	Report	Delić (yellow card) 3'; Grigalashvili 61'; Tsirin (yellow card) 90+1'	Stadium: Zhetysu Stadium; Attendance: 2,000; Referee: Zhandos Abzhan

1 July 2018 16	Atyrau	0 – 0	Kyzylzhar	Atyrau
19:30 (UTC+6)	Ablitarov (yellow card) 20'; K.Kalmuratov (yellow card) 90'	Report	Coronel (yellow card) 90+5'	Stadium: Tomarly Stadion; Attendance: 1,000; Referee: Timur Kumashev

7 July 2018 17	Kyzylzhar	2 – 1	Aktobe	Petropavl
17:00 (UTC+6)	T.Muldinov (yellow card) 54'; Ceesay 65'; Coronel (yellow card) 66' (goal) 74'; Delić (yellow card) 69'; Popkhadze (yellow card) 81'	Report	Miličević (yellow card) 27'; Pizzelli 44' (pen.); D.Zhalmukan (yellow card) 82'	Stadium: Avangard Stadium; Attendance: 4,000; Referee: Georgiy Chekhovskiy

14 July 2018 18	Akzhayik	2 – 0	Kyzylzhar	Oral
20:00 (UTC+6)	Mané 2', 70'	Report	Delić (yellow card) 80'	Stadium: Petr Atoyan Stadium; Attendance: 500; Referee: Bagdat Abdullaev

28 July 2018 20	Kaisar	2 – 1	Kyzylzhar	Kyzylorda
18:30 (UTC+6)	Gorman (yellow card) 18' (goal) 29'; Coureur 37'; Korobkin (yellow card) 67'	Report	K.Sultanov (yellow card) 71'; Ceesay (yellow card) 78'; Lečić 90+3'	Stadium: Gani Muratbayev Stadium; Attendance: 2,000; Referee: Arman Ismuratov

5 August 2018 21	Kyzylzhar	1 – 0	Irtysh Pavlodar	Petropavl
17:00 (UTC+6)	T.Muldinov 37'; Tsirin (yellow card) 90+4'	Report	Seco (yellow card) 26'; R.Aslan (yellow card) 42'	Stadium: Avangard Stadium; Attendance: 2,500; Referee: Marat Iskakov

12 August 2018 22	Kyzylzhar	1 – 3	Kairat	Petropavl
17:00 (UTC+6)	Grigalashvili 17' (pen.); Ceesay (yellow card) 29'; Coronel (yellow card) 51'; Delić (yellow card) 78'	Report	Eseola 15'; Eppel 63'; Isael 90+4'	Stadium: Avangard Stadium; Attendance: 7,500; Referee: Bakhyt Kyzylbaev

18 August 2018 23	Kyzylzhar	–	Kairat	Petropavl
(UTC+6)				Stadium: Avangard Stadium

26 August 2018 24	Astana	3 – 0	Kyzylzhar	Astana
20:00 (UTC+6)	Shchotkin 13', 41', 72'; S.Sagnayev (yellow card) 67'	Report	Drachenko (yellow card) 23'; A.Shabaev (yellow card) 42'; Stetsenko (yellow card) 52'; Ceesay (yellow card) 73'	Stadium: Astana Arena; Attendance: 1,200; Referee: Anatolyi Vishnichenko

16 September 2018 26	Irtysh Pavlodar	0 – 1	Kyzylzhar	Pavlodar
18:00 (UTC+6)	Chibuike (yellow card) 20'; R.Aslan (red card) 27'; Rodrigo (yellow card) 45'; R.Yesimov (yellow card) 57'; Fonseca (yellow card) 69'	Report	T.Muldinov 7' (yellow card) 65'; Popkhadze (yellow card) 24'; Delić (yellow card) 78'	Stadium: Central Stadium; Attendance: 3,000; Referee: Furkat Atajanov

22 September 2018 27	Atyrau	3 – 2	Kyzylzhar	Atyrau
18:30 (UTC+6)	Pertsukh 11'; Khairullin 55' (pen.); A.Rodionov 88'	Report	Lečić 27'; K.Sultanov (yellow card) 54'; O.Altayev (yellow card) 58' (yellow-red card) 58'; Grigalashvili 70'	Stadium: Munaishy Stadium; Attendance: 2,500; Referee: Bakhyt Kyzylbaev

26 September 2018 25	Kyzylzhar	2 – 1	Shakhter Karagandy	Petropavl
15:00 (UTC+6)	Coronel (yellow card) 36'; Ceesay 52'; Grigalashvili (yellow card) 78'; E.Nabiev 90' (yellow card) 90+1'	Report	Droppa (yellow card) 73'; Najaryan 76'; Y.Tarasov (yellow card) 88'	Stadium: Avangard Stadium; Attendance: 3,000; Referee: Aleksandr Aliyev

30 September 2018 28	Kyzylzhar	1 – 0	Kaisar	Petropavl
15:00 (UTC+6)	T.Muldinov 15' (yellow card) 62'; Ceesay (yellow card) 30'; Tsirin (yellow card) 82'	Report	Narzildaev (yellow card) 35'; Coureur (yellow card) 62'; I.Amirseitov (yellow card) 64'; Baizhanov (yellow card) 90+3'	Stadium: Avangard Stadium; Attendance: 4,000; Referee: Arman Ismuratov

6 October 2018 29	Akzhayik	0 – 0	Kyzylzhar	Oral
17:00 (UTC+6)	E.Tapalov (yellow card) 20'; Basov (yellow card) 84'	Report	Stetsenko (yellow card) 22'; Popkhadze (yellow card) 45'; V.Gunchenko (yellow card) 81'; E.Nabiyev (yellow card) 90+7'	Stadium: Petr Atoyan Stadium; Attendance: 800; Referee: Denis Izmailov

21 October 2018 30	Kyzylzhar	1 – 1	Zhetysu	Petropavl
15:00 (UTC+6)	Delić (yellow card) 50' (goal) 66'; Drachenko (yellow card) 76'	Report	Sadownichy (yellow card) 7'; E.Altynbekov (yellow card) 13'; Mukhutdinov (yellow card) 24'; Mawutor (yellow card) 36'; Kuklys 45'; Malakyan (yellow card) 74'; Kharabara (yellow card) 81'	Stadium: Avangard Stadium; Attendance: 3,000; Referee: Timur Kumashev

27 October 2018 31	Aktobe	1 – 0	Kyzylzhar	Aktobe
17:00 (UTC+6)	Reynaldo 20'; Valiullin (yellow card) 62'; Radin (yellow card) 77'	Report	B.Kozhabayev (yellow card) 66'; Delić (yellow card) 82'	Stadium: Central Stadium; Attendance: 7,000; Referee: Anatolyi Vishnichenko

31 October 2018 23	Kyzylzhar	2 – 1	Kairat	Petropavl
15:00 (UTC+6)	Skorykh (yellow card) 34'; T.Muldinov 37'; A.Dzhanuzakov (yellow card) 52'; Ceesay (yellow card) 53' (goal) 81'; Tsirin (yellow card) 90+4'	Report	Paragulgov 6'; Alip (yellow card) 30'; Kuat (yellow card) 50'	Stadium: Avangard Stadium; Attendance: 2,500; Referee: Askhat Abdanbayev

3 November 2018 32	Kyzylzhar	1 – 2	Ordabasy	Petropavl
15:00 (UTC+6)	I.Aitov (yellow card) 19'; Popkhadze (yellow card) 39'; T.Muldinov 61'	Report	Diakate (yellow card) 25'; Moldakaraev 59'; U.Zhaksybaev (yellow card) 76'; Kojić 90+3'	Stadium: Avangard Stadium; Attendance: 3,800; Referee: Sergey Gorokhovodatskiy

11 November 2018 33	Tobol	3 – 0	Kyzylzhar	Kostanay
15:00 (UTC+6)	Kvekveskiri 1'; Fedin 56'; Zhumaskaliyev 83'	Report	A.Dzhanuzakov (yellow card) 14'; A.Shabaev (yellow card) 66'	Stadium: Central Stadium; Attendance: 6,000; Referee: Denis Izmailov

==== League table ====
Pos	Team	Pld	W	D	L	GF	GA	GD	Pts	Qualification or relegation
8	Shakhter Karagandy	33	8	12	13	29	36	−7	36	
9	Atyrau	33	9	9	15	34	47	−13	36	
10	Irtysh Pavlodar (O)	33	10	5	18	28	45	−17	35	Qualification for the relegation play-offs
11	Kyzylzhar (R)	33	10	5	18	27	48	−21	35	Relegation to the Kazakhstan First Division
12	Akzhayik (R)	33	7	9	17	31	48	−17	30	Relegation to the Kazakhstan First Division

Source: UEFA, Soccerway
Rules for classification: 1) Points; 2) Goal difference; 3) Matches won; 4) Goals scored; 5) Away goals scored; 6) Head-to-head points; 7) Head-to-head matches won; 8) Head-to-head goal difference; 9) Head-to-head goals scored; 10) Head-to-head away goals scored; 11) Draw.
(O) Play-off winners; (R) Relegated

=== Kazakhstan Cup ===
18 April 2018 Last 16	Shakhter Karagandy	0 – 0 (a.e.t.) (7 – 6 p)	Kyzylzhar	Karaganda
16:00 (UTC+6)	K.Pasichnik (yellow card) 108'	Report	Delić (yellow card) 90+1'; Popkhadze (yellow card) 59' (yellow-red card) 120'	Stadium: Shakhter Stadium; Attendance: 800; Referee: Ruslan Sultangaliev
	Penalties
	Tkachuk (penalty scored); Kirill Pasichnik (penalty scored); Subotić (penalty scored); Aidos Tattybayev (penalty scored); Stojanović (penalty missed); Vyacheslav Putintsev (penalty scored); Najaryan (penalty scored); Mikhail Gabyshev (penalty scored)		Stupić (penalty missed); Punoševac (penalty scored); Muldarov (penalty scored); Timur Muldinov (penalty scored); Coronel (penalty scored); Aslan Dzhanuzakov (penalty scored); Viktor Gunchenko (penalty scored); Ildar Aitov (penalty missed)

== Squad statistics ==
As of Match played 11 November 2018

=== Appearances and goals ===
No.	Pos	Nat	Player	Total		Premier League		Kazakhstan Cup	
No.	Pos	Nat	Player	Apps	Goals	Apps	Goals	Apps	Goals
1	GK	(Kazakhstan) KAZ	Anton Tsirin	21	0	20	0	1	0
2	DF	(Georgia (country)) GEO	Giorgi Popkhadze	29	0	26+2	0	1	0
3	DF	(Kazakhstan) KAZ	Bagdaulet Kozhabayev	9	0	8+1	0	0	0
4	DF	(Kazakhstan) KAZ	Karam Sultanov	25	0	20+4	0	1	0
5	MF	(Ukraine) UKR	Maksym Drachenko	16	0	15+1	0	0	0
7	FW	(Kazakhstan) KAZ	Timur Muldinov	30	8	24+5	8	0+1	0
8	FW	(Kazakhstan) KAZ	Dmitry Savchenko	3	0	0+2	0	1	0
9	MF	(Kazakhstan) KAZ	Sergei Skorykh	21	0	17+4	0	0	0
10	MF	(Georgia (country)) GEO	Shota Grigalashvili	28	5	27+1	5	0	0
11	DF	(Kazakhstan) KAZ	Viktor Gunchenko	18	0	5+12	0	1	0
14	MF	(Kazakhstan) KAZ	Aslan Dzhanuzakov	22	0	9+12	0	1	0
15	MF	(Kazakhstan) KAZ	Elmar Nabiev	5	1	0+5	1	0	0
16	MF	(Paraguay) PAR	Freddy Coronel	30	2	27+2	2	1	0
17	DF	(Kazakhstan) KAZ	Olzhas Altayev	10	0	8+2	0	0	0
18	FW	(The Gambia) GAM	Momodou Ceesay	14	3	12+2	3	0	0
21	MF	(Montenegro) MNE	Uroš Delić	27	1	24+2	1	1	0
22	MF	(Kazakhstan) KAZ	Ali Aliyev	6	0	4+2	0	0	0
25	DF	(Ukraine) UKR	Oleksandr Stetsenko	9	0	5+4	0	0	0
26	FW	(Serbia) SRB	Miroslav Lečić	12	2	6+6	2	0	0
27	DF	(Kazakhstan) KAZ	Andrey Shabaev	16	0	12+4	0	0	0
40	DF	(Kazakhstan) KAZ	Ildar Aitov	31	0	28+2	0	1	0
78	GK	(Kazakhstan) KAZ	Timurbek Zakirov	13	0	13	0	0	0
Players away from Kyzylzhar on loan:
Players who left Kyzylzhar during the season:
3	DF	(Kazakhstan) KAZ	Aleksei Muldarov	7	0	6	0	0+1	0
5	MF	(Georgia (country)) GEO	Gogita Gogua	11	1	8+3	1	0	0
6	MF	(Kazakhstan) KAZ	Alibek Ayaganov	2	0	1+1	0	0	0
13	FW	(Serbia) SRB	Bratislav Punoševac	16	4	14+1	4	0+1	0
15	DF	(Kazakhstan) KAZ	Georgiy Makayev	3	0	1+1	0	1	0
24	FW	(Bosnia and Herzegovina) BIH	Boško Stupić	20	0	9+10	0	1	0
25	DF	(Bulgaria) BUL	Mihail Venkov	14	0	14	0	0	0

=== Goal scorers ===
Place	Position	Nation	Number	Name	Premier League	Kazakhstan Cup	Total
1	FW	(Kazakhstan)	7	Timur Muldinov	8	0	8
2	MF	(Georgia (country))	10	Shota Grigalashvili	5	0	5
3	FW	(Serbia)	13	Bratislav Punoševac	4	0	4
4	FW	(The Gambia)	18	Momodou Ceesay	3	0	3
5	MF	(Paraguay)	16	Freddy Coronel	2	0	2
5	FW	(Serbia)	26	Miroslav Lečić	2	0	2
7	MF	(Georgia (country))	5	Gogita Gogua	1	0	1
7	MF	(Kazakhstan)	15	Elmar Nabiev	1	0	1
7	MF	(Montenegro)	21	Uroš Delić	1	0	1
				TOTALS	27	0	27

=== Disciplinary record ===
Number	Nation	Position	Name	Premier League		Kazakhstan Cup		Total	
Number	Nation	Position	Name	Booked	Sent off (straight red)	Booked	Sent off (straight red)	Booked	Sent off (straight red)
1	(Kazakhstan)	GK	Anton Tsirin	5	0	0	0	5	0
2	(Georgia (country))	DF	Giorgi Popkhadze	6	0	2	1	8	1
3	(Kazakhstan)	DF	Bagdaulet Kozhabayev	1	0	0	0	1	0
4	(Kazakhstan)	DF	Karam Sultanov	3	0	0	0	3	0
5	(Ukraine)	MF	Maksym Drachenko	2	0	0	0	2	0
7	(Kazakhstan)	FW	Timur Muldinov	9	0	0	0	9	0
8	(Kazakhstan)	FW	Dmitry Savchenko	1	0	0	0	1	0
9	(Kazakhstan)	MF	Sergei Skorykh	1	0	0	0	1	0
10	(Georgia (country))	MF	Shota Grigalashvili	2	0	0	0	2	0
11	(Kazakhstan)	DF	Viktor Gunchenko	2	0	0	0	2	0
14	(Kazakhstan)	MF	Aslan Dzhanuzakov	2	0	0	0	2	0
15	(Kazakhstan)	MF	Elmar Nabiev	2	0	0	0	2	0
16	(Paraguay)	MF	Freddy Coronel	6	0	0	0	6	0
17	(Kazakhstan)	DF	Olzhas Altayev	3	1	0	0	3	1
18	(The Gambia)	FW	Momodou Ceesay	5	0	0	0	5	0
21	(Montenegro)	MF	Uroš Delić	8	0	1	0	9	0
22	(Kazakhstan)	MF	Ali Aliyev	1	0	0	0	1	0
25	(Ukraine)	DF	Oleksandr Stetsenko	2	0	0	0	2	0
27	(Kazakhstan)	DF	Andrey Shabaev	2	0	0	0	2	0
40	(Kazakhstan)	DF	Ildar Aitov	3	0	0	0	3	0
Players who left Kyzylzhar during the season:
3	(Kazakhstan)	DF	Aleksei Muldarov	3	0	0	0	3	0
5	(Georgia (country))	MF	Gogita Gogua	4	0	0	0	4	0
6	(Kazakhstan)	MF	Alibek Ayaganov	1	0	0	0	1	0
13	(Serbia)	FW	Bratislav Punoševac	3	0	0	0	3	0
24	(Bosnia and Herzegovina)	FW	Boško Stupić	1	0	0	0	1	0
25	(Bulgaria)	DF	Mihail Venkov	2	0	0	0	2	0
			TOTALS	81	1	3	1	84	2
