= List of Kazakhstan football transfers summer 2018 =

This is a list of Kazakh football transfers during the summer transfer window, 4–31 July 2018, by club. Only clubs of the 2018 Kazakhstan Premier League are included.

== Kazakhstan Premier League 2018 ==
=== Aktobe ===
In: Note: Flags indicate national team as defined under FIFA eligibility rules; some limited exceptions apply. Players may hold more than one non-FIFA nationality.

| No. | Pos. | Nation | Player |

Out: Note: Flags indicate national team as defined under FIFA eligibility rules; some limited exceptions apply. Players may hold more than one non-FIFA nationality.

| No. | Pos. | Nation | Player |
|---|---|---|---|
| 6 | DF | BRA | Fabrício |
| 14 | MF | KAZ | Igor Yurin (to (Kazakhstan) Shakhter Karagandy) |
| 73 | MF | KAZ | Didar Zhalmukan (loan return to (Kazakhstan) Astana) |
| — | MF | GEO | Jaba Jighauri (to (France) GF38, previously on loan to (Kazakhstan) Ordabasy) |

=== Akzhayik ===
In: Note: Flags indicate national team as defined under FIFA eligibility rules; some limited exceptions apply. Players may hold more than one non-FIFA nationality.

| No. | Pos. | Nation | Player |
|---|---|---|---|
| 2 | FW | LVA | Artūrs Karašausks (from (Latvia) Liepāja) |
| 3 | MF | CRO | Denis Glavina (from (Kazakhstan) Zhetysu) |
| 9 | FW | KAZ | Kenesbay Shubayev (from (Kazakhstan) Makhtaaral) |
| 24 | DF | UKR | Ambrosiy Chachua (from (Ukraine) Karpaty Lviv) |
| 88 | FW | CIV | Idrissa Kouyaté (from (Lebanon) Al-Ahed) |
| — | MF | KAZ | Abay Zhunusov (from (Kazakhstan) Astana) |

Out: Note: Flags indicate national team as defined under FIFA eligibility rules; some limited exceptions apply. Players may hold more than one non-FIFA nationality.

| No. | Pos. | Nation | Player |
|---|---|---|---|
| 3 | DF | UKR | Oleksandr Volovyk (to (Ukraine) Podillya Khmelnytskyi) |
| 44 | DF | UKR | Yuriy Putrash (to (Ukraine) Lviv) |
| 45 | FW | UKR | Aderinsola Eseola (loan return to (Ukraine) Zirka Kropyvnytskyi) |
| 88 | FW | CIV | Idrissa Kouyaté (to (Tunisia) Monastir) |

=== Astana ===
In: Note: Flags indicate national team as defined under FIFA eligibility rules; some limited exceptions apply. Players may hold more than one non-FIFA nationality.

| No. | Pos. | Nation | Player |
|---|---|---|---|
| 2 | DF | SRB | Antonio Rukavina (from (Spain) Villarreal) |
| 6 | MF | HUN | László Kleinheisler (from (Germany) Werder Bremen, previously on loan) |
| 11 | MF | BRA | Pedro Henrique (loan from (Greece) PAOK) |
| 14 | MF | CRO | Marin Tomasov (from (Croatia) HNK Rijeka, previously on loan) |
| 20 | MF | AZE | Richard Almeida (from (Azerbaijan) Qarabağ) |
| 30 | FW | COD | Junior Kabananga (loan from (Saudi Arabia) Al-Nassr) |
| 32 | FW | CUW | Rangelo Janga (from (Belgium) KAA Gent) |
| — | DF | KAZ | Marat Bystrov (from (Russia) Tambov) |

Out: Note: Flags indicate national team as defined under FIFA eligibility rules; some limited exceptions apply. Players may hold more than one non-FIFA nationality.

| No. | Pos. | Nation | Player |
|---|---|---|---|
| 4 | DF | BLR | Igor Shitov (to (Belarus) Dinamo Minsk) |
| 9 | FW | SRB | Đorđe Despotović (to (Russia) Orenburg) |
| 23 | FW | GHA | Patrick Twumasi (to (Spain) Deportivo Alavés) |
| 28 | MF | KAZ | Yuriy Pertsukh (loan to (Kazakhstan) Atyrau) |
| 31 | MF | KAZ | Abay Zhunusov (to (Kazakhstan) Akzhayik) |
| 88 | MF | SRB | Marko Stanojević (to (Greece) Levadiakos) |
| — | DF | KAZ | Marat Bystrov (loan to (Kazakhstan) Tobol) |
| — | MF | KAZ | Didar Zhalmukan (loan to (Kazakhstan) Atyrau) |

=== Atyrau ===
In: Note: Flags indicate national team as defined under FIFA eligibility rules; some limited exceptions apply. Players may hold more than one non-FIFA nationality.

| No. | Pos. | Nation | Player |
|---|---|---|---|
| 7 | MF | SVK | František Kubík (from (Slovakia) MŠK Žilina) |
| 23 | DF | CRO | Ivica Žunić (from (Ukraine) Chornomorets Odesa) |
| 23 | MF | KAZ | Didar Zhalmukan (loan from (Kazakhstan) Astana) |
| 24 | MF | KAZ | Yuriy Pertsukh (loan from (Kazakhstan) Astana) |
| 44 | MF | CRO | Jure Obšivač (from (Romania) Sepsi Sfântu Gheorghe) |

Out: Note: Flags indicate national team as defined under FIFA eligibility rules; some limited exceptions apply. Players may hold more than one non-FIFA nationality.

| No. | Pos. | Nation | Player |
|---|---|---|---|
| 7 | MF | KGZ | Anton Zemlianukhin |
| 12 | DF | KAZ | Ruslan Esatov (to (Kazakhstan) Makhtaaral) |
| 23 | MF | KAZ | Piraliy Aliev (to (Kazakhstan) Irtysh Pavlodar) |
| 23 | DF | CRO | Ivica Žunić |
| 30 | DF | SRB | Stefan Živković |
| 32 | DF | KAZ | Rafkat Aslan (to (Kazakhstan) Irtysh Pavlodar) |
| 66 | MF | KAZ | Anton Chichulin (to (Kazakhstan) Shakhter Karagandy) |
| 78 | FW | BLR | Ihar Zyankovich (to (Kazakhstan) Kaisar) |
| — | DF | KAZ | Yerasen Amanzhol (loan to (Kazakhstan) Caspiy) |

=== Irtysh ===
In: Note: Flags indicate national team as defined under FIFA eligibility rules; some limited exceptions apply. Players may hold more than one non-FIFA nationality.

| No. | Pos. | Nation | Player |
|---|---|---|---|
| 8 | MF | KAZ | Piraliy Aliev (from (Kazakhstan) Atyrau) |
| 10 | MF | BRA | Rodrigo António |
| 37 | DF | KAZ | Rafkat Aslan (to (Kazakhstan) Atyrau) |
| 47 | MF | POR | Hugo Seco (from (Portugal) Feirense) |
| 50 | FW | NGA | John Chibuike (from (Turkey) Samsunspor) |
| 60 | FW | GNB | Abel Camará (from (Italy) Cremonese) |
| — | GK | KAZ | Dzhurakhon Babakhanov (from (Kazakhstan) Zhetysu) |

Out: Note: Flags indicate national team as defined under FIFA eligibility rules; some limited exceptions apply. Players may hold more than one non-FIFA nationality.

| No. | Pos. | Nation | Player |
|---|---|---|---|
| 1 | GK | KAZ | Almat Bekbaev (to (Kazakhstan) Zhetysu) |
| 6 | MF | KAZ | Rakhimzhan Rozybakiev (to (Kazakhstan) Okzhetpes) |
| 9 | FW | HON | Eddie Hernández (to (Iran) Zob Ahan) |
| 14 | DF | KAZ | Berik Aitbayev (to (Kazakhstan) Taraz) |
| 15 | MF | BLR | Syarhey Kislyak |
| 19 | DF | KAZ | Maksat Amirkhanov (to (Kazakhstan) Taraz) |
| 39 | FW | NGA | Gbolahan Salami |
| 65 | DF | ROU | Adrian Avrămia |
| — | DF | KAZ | Midat Galbaev (to (Kazakhstan) Kyzylzhar) |

=== Kairat ===
In: Note: Flags indicate national team as defined under FIFA eligibility rules; some limited exceptions apply. Players may hold more than one non-FIFA nationality.

| No. | Pos. | Nation | Player |
|---|---|---|---|
| 18 | FW | UKR | Aderinsola Eseola (from (Ukraine) Zirka Kropyvnytskyi) |
| 19 | FW | HUN | Márton Eppel (from (Hungary) Budapest Honvéd) |
| 26 | DF | BLR | Syarhey Palitsevich (from (Turkey) Gençlerbirliği) |

Out: Note: Flags indicate national team as defined under FIFA eligibility rules; some limited exceptions apply. Players may hold more than one non-FIFA nationality.

| No. | Pos. | Nation | Player |
|---|---|---|---|
| 11 | FW | URU | Hugo Silveira (loan return to (Uruguay) Nacional) |
| 21 | FW | NOR | Chuma Anene (to (Denmark) Fredericia) |
| 26 | DF | CIV | Cédric Gogoua (to (Russia) SKA-Khabarovsk) |

=== Kaisar ===
In: Note: Flags indicate national team as defined under FIFA eligibility rules; some limited exceptions apply. Players may hold more than one non-FIFA nationality.

| No. | Pos. | Nation | Player |
|---|---|---|---|
| 78 | FW | BLR | Ihar Zyankovich (from (Kazakhstan) Atyrau) |
| 87 | FW | SRB | Bratislav Punoševac (from (Kazakhstan) Kyzylzhar) |

Out: Note: Flags indicate national team as defined under FIFA eligibility rules; some limited exceptions apply. Players may hold more than one non-FIFA nationality.

| No. | Pos. | Nation | Player |
|---|---|---|---|
| 76 | FW | MTQ | Yoann Arquin (to (England) Yeovil Town) |

=== Kyzylzhar ===
In: Note: Flags indicate national team as defined under FIFA eligibility rules; some limited exceptions apply. Players may hold more than one non-FIFA nationality.

| No. | Pos. | Nation | Player |
|---|---|---|---|
| 3 | FW | SRB | Miroslav Lečić (from (Serbia) Metalac) |
| 5 | MF | UKR | Maksym Drachenko (from (Ukraine) Zirka Kropyvnytskyi) |
| 18 | FW | GAM | Momodou Ceesay |
| 25 | DF | UKR | Oleksandr Stetsenko |
| — | DF | KAZ | Elmar Nabiev (from (Kazakhstan) Makhtaaral) |
| — | MF | KAZ | Midat Galbaev (from (Kazakhstan) Irtysh Pavlodar) |
| — | MF | KAZ | Oleg Nedashkovsky (from (Kazakhstan) Ekibastuz) |

Out: Note: Flags indicate national team as defined under FIFA eligibility rules; some limited exceptions apply. Players may hold more than one non-FIFA nationality.

| No. | Pos. | Nation | Player |
|---|---|---|---|
| 3 | DF | KAZ | Aleksei Muldarov |
| 5 | MF | GEO | Gogita Gogua (to (Georgia (country)) Dila Gori) |
| 6 | MF | KAZ | Alibek Ayaganov |
| 13 | FW | SRB | Bratislav Punoševac (to (Kazakhstan) Kaisar) |
| 15 | DF | KAZ | Georgiy Makayev |
| 24 | FW | BIH | Boško Stupić (to (Kazakhstan) Kyran) |
| 25 | DF | BUL | Mihail Venkov (to (Bulgaria) Chernomorets Balchik) |

=== Ordabasy ===
In: Note: Flags indicate national team as defined under FIFA eligibility rules; some limited exceptions apply. Players may hold more than one non-FIFA nationality.

| No. | Pos. | Nation | Player |
|---|---|---|---|
| 7 | FW | SRB | Nemanja Kojić (from (Turkey) İstanbulspor) |
| 19 | MF | BIH | Mirzad Mehanović (from (Czech Republic) Fastav Zlín) |
| 39 | DF | FRA | Helton (from (Bulgaria) Septemvri Sofia) |
| 70 | MF | CRO | Luka Muženjak (from (Croatia) Cibalia) |
| 71 | FW | KAZ | Zhasulan Moldakaraev (from (Kazakhstan) Tobol) |

Out: Note: Flags indicate national team as defined under FIFA eligibility rules; some limited exceptions apply. Players may hold more than one non-FIFA nationality.

| No. | Pos. | Nation | Player |
|---|---|---|---|
| 7 | MF | ARG | Facundo Bertoglio (to (Greece) PAS Lamia 1964) |
| 18 | FW | KAZ | Bekzhan Abdrakhman |
| 31 | MF | GEO | Jaba Jighauri (loan return to (Kazakhstan) Aktobe) |
| 44 | DF | CRO | Hrvoje Spahija |
| 70 | FW | UZB | Ivan Nagaev |
| 95 | FW | KAZ | Alisher Suley (to (Kazakhstan) Taraz) |
| 99 | GK | KAZ | David Loria |
| — | DF | KAZ | Abylkhar Zulfikarov |

=== Shakhter Karagandy ===
In: Note: Flags indicate national team as defined under FIFA eligibility rules; some limited exceptions apply. Players may hold more than one non-FIFA nationality.

| No. | Pos. | Nation | Player |
|---|---|---|---|
| 16 | MF | EST | Sergei Mošnikov (from (Poland) Górnik Łęczna) |
| 18 | MF | KAZ | Igor Yurin (from (Kazakhstan) Aktobe) |
| 29 | MF | CZE | Lukáš Droppa (from (Slovakia) Slovan Bratislava) |
| 84 | MF | KAZ | Anton Chichulin (from (Kazakhstan) Atyrau) |
| — | FW | ARM | Gegham Harutyunyan (loan from (Armenia) Gandzasar Kapan) |

Out: Note: Flags indicate national team as defined under FIFA eligibility rules; some limited exceptions apply. Players may hold more than one non-FIFA nationality.

| No. | Pos. | Nation | Player |
|---|---|---|---|
| 9 | FW | KAZ | Aidos Tattybayev (to (Kazakhstan) Taraz) |
| 13 | MF | UKR | Oleksandr Mihunov |
| 24 | MF | SRB | Milan Stojanović |
| 31 | FW | SUI | Danijel Subotić |

=== Tobol ===
In: Note: Flags indicate national team as defined under FIFA eligibility rules; some limited exceptions apply. Players may hold more than one non-FIFA nationality.

| No. | Pos. | Nation | Player |
|---|---|---|---|
| 5 | DF | ROU | Ionuț Larie (from (Romania) Steaua București) |
| 92 | DF | KAZ | Marat Bystrov (loan from (Kazakhstan) Astana) |
| 99 | FW | ARG | Juan Lescano (loan from (Russia) Anzhi Makhachkala) |

Out: Note: Flags indicate national team as defined under FIFA eligibility rules; some limited exceptions apply. Players may hold more than one non-FIFA nationality.

| No. | Pos. | Nation | Player |
|---|---|---|---|
| 4 | DF | MKD | Vanče Šikov |
| 17 | FW | KAZ | Zhasulan Moldakaraev (to (Kazakhstan) Ordabasy) |
| 25 | FW | UKR | Anton Shynder (to (Hungary) Kisvárda) |
| 77 | DF | UKR | Vasyl Kobin |

=== Zhetysu ===
In: Note: Flags indicate national team as defined under FIFA eligibility rules; some limited exceptions apply. Players may hold more than one non-FIFA nationality.

| No. | Pos. | Nation | Player |
|---|---|---|---|
| 3 | DF | BLR | Andrey Lebedzew (from (Belarus) Dynamo Brest) |
| 27 | FW | UKR | Ruslan Stepanyuk (from (Ukraine) Veres Rivne) |
| 70 | GK | KAZ | Almat Bekbaev (from (Kazakhstan) Irtysh Pavlodar) |
| 80 | MF | UZB | Server Djeparov (from (Iran) Esteghlal) |

Out: Note: Flags indicate national team as defined under FIFA eligibility rules; some limited exceptions apply. Players may hold more than one non-FIFA nationality.

| No. | Pos. | Nation | Player |
|---|---|---|---|
| 3 | MF | CRO | Denis Glavina (to (Kazakhstan) Akzhayik) |
| 9 | FW | SRB | Milan Bojović |
| 19 | MF | KAZ | Taras Danilyuk |
| 21 | MF | SVN | Dino Martinović |
| 24 | GK | KAZ | Dzhurakhon Babakhanov (to (Kazakhstan) Irtysh Pavlodar) |
| 27 | DF | KAZ | Timur Rudoselskiy |
