= Helton Dos Reis =

French footballer of Cap-Verdian descent (born 1988)

Helton
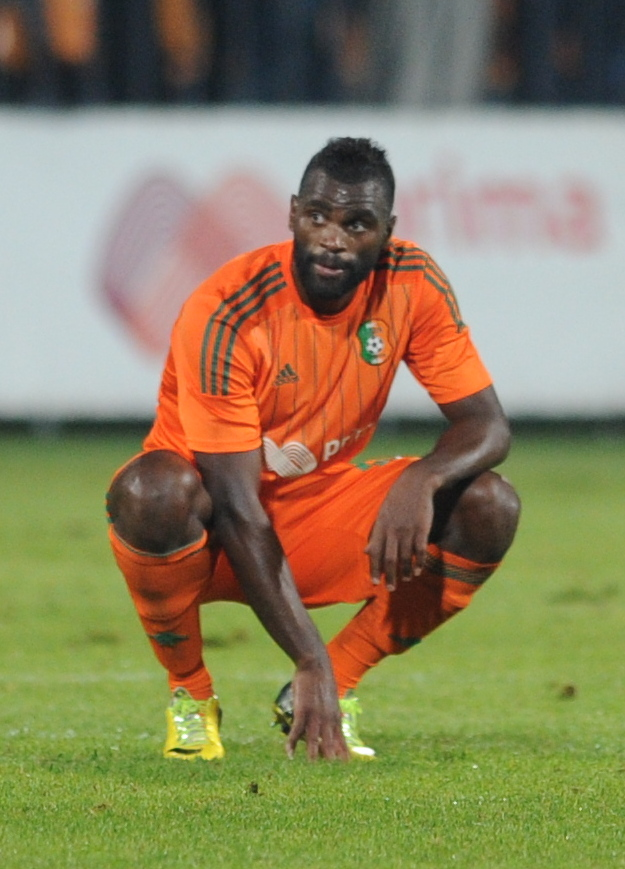

Personal information
- Full name: Helton Dos Reis
- Date of birth: 1 May 1988 (age 38)
- Place of birth: Lyon, France
- Height: 1.85 m (6 ft 1 in)
- Positions: Right-back; centre-back

Senior career*
Years	Team	Apps	(Gls)
2007–2008	Gueugnon	12	(1)
2008–2010	Saint-Étienne	4	(0)
2008	→ RM Hamm Benfica (loan)	15	(2)
2009–2010	Saint-Étienne B	29	(7)
2010–2011	Grenoble	29	(1)
2011	Apollon Limassol	5	(0)
2012–2013	Lyon-Duchère	16	(0)
2013–2015	Lokomotiv Sofia	53	(2)
2015	Litex Lovech II	1	(0)
2015	Litex Lovech	12	(1)
2016–2017	Shenzhen FC	29	(1)
2017–2018	Septemvri Sofia	24	(0)
2018	Ordabasy	12	(0)
2019–2020	Jeddah		(0)
- * Club domestic league appearances and goals as of 21:11, 18 November 2018 (UTC)

Helton Dos Reis (born 1 May 1988) is a French footballer of Cap-Verdian descent who most recently played as a defender for Jeddah.

== Career ==
Helton began his career with Gueugnon. In June 2008, he joined Ligue 1 side Saint-Étienne and was immediately loaned out to RM Hamm Benfica in Luxembourg. After his return in Saint-Etienne, he played mainly for their B team. Helton made his Ligue 1 debut on 7 November 2009 in a 1–0 win over Nancy at Stade Marcel Picot, coming off the bench to replace Cédric Varrault on the 16th minute of the match.

On 4 August 2010, Helton signed for Grenoble Foot 38 on a free transfer. Two days later, he scored the only goal in Grenoble's 1–0 victory over Le Havre. He made 29 appearances for the club in Ligue 2. After one season at Grenoble, Helton joined Cypriot First Division side Apollon Limassol. He remained in Cyprus for four months, and moved on to Lyon-Duchère in 2012.

On 12 September 2013, after a successful trial period, Helton signed a contract with Bulgarian club Lokomotiv Sofia. He performed well for Lokomotiv through the years, cementing a place as a right-back in the first-team. Helton scored on his Bulgarian A Group debut on 21 September, in a 2–2 draw against Cherno More Varna at Ticha Stadium. He made 53 league appearances and scored two league goals for Lokomotiv.

On 26 August 2015, Helton signed for Litex Lovech on a free transfer. Three days later, he was one of Litex's unused substitutes in their 1–0 league loss against Beroe Stara Zagora. On 30 August, he played full 90 minutes for Litex II in a B Group match against Ludogorets II. On 12 September, Helton made his debut for Litex in the 2–0 away win against Botev Plovdiv, playing at centre-back alongside Rafael Pérez instead of his usual right-back position.

On 27 July 2017 he returned in Bulgaria, after a time spend in the China club Shenzhen FC, to sign with the newly promoted to the top division team of Septemvri Sofia, led by his ex manager in Lokomotiv Sofia.
