= Luka Muženjak =

Croatian footballer

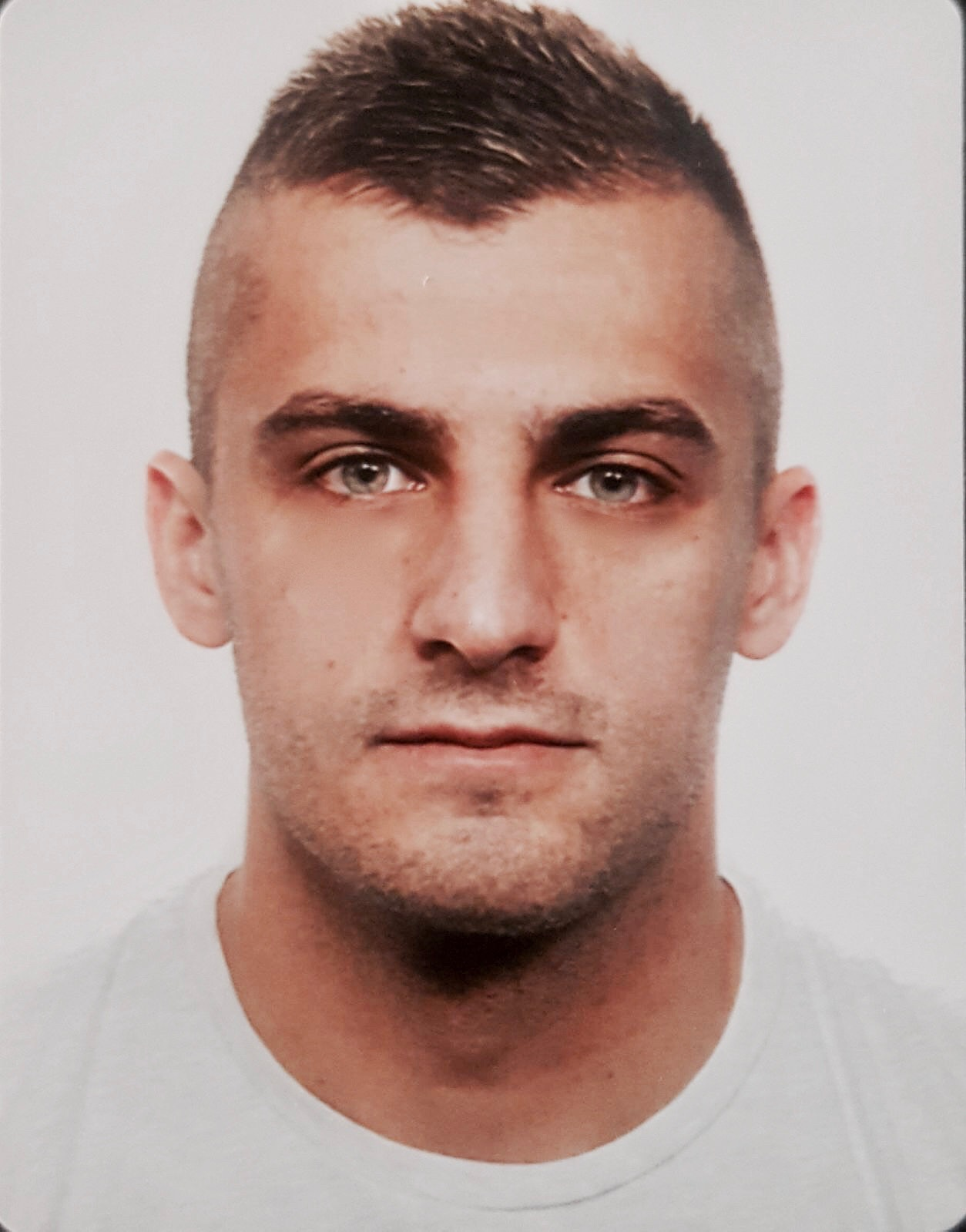

Personal information
- Date of birth: 4 July 1993 (age 33)
- Place of birth: Vinkovci, Croatia
- Height: 1.77 m (5 ft 9 1/2 in)
- Position: Defensive midfielder

Team information
- Current team: NK Dilj
- Number: 9

Youth career
- 2003–2011: Cibalia

Senior career*
Years	Team	Apps	(Gls)
2011–2015	Cibalia	69	(1)
2015–2016	Zavrč	1	(0)
2016	Segesta	5	(0)
2016–2018	Cibalia	46	(0)
2018	Ordabasy	8	(0)
2019–2021	BSK Bijelo Brdo	40	(3)

International career
2009	Croatia U16	7	(0)
2019–2010	Croatia U17	8	(0)
2011	Croatia U18	3	(0)
2011	Croatia U19	2	(0)
- * Club domestic league appearances and goals as of 4 November 2022

Luka Muzenjak (born 4 July 1993) is a Croatian footballer who plays as a defensive midfielder for Nk Dilj, Vinkovci.

== Club career ==
=== HNK Cibalia Vinkovci ===
Luka Muzenjak has followed the entire Academy of HNK Cibalia Vinkovci and is promoted from Cibalia Vinkovci U19 to Cibalia's senior side.

The Croatian footballer has made 102 appearances for HNK Cibalia Vincovci and has 20 international caps in the U16-U19s for Croatia.

Renowned as a tactical leader, he understands the manager's call-card words to defensive midfielders of "position, stability and control". He is an 'assistant coach on the pitch', interpreting and applying the manager's approach.

In 2013 he seemed to be on the verge to join Italian giants A.S. Roma. He joined BSK Bijelo Brdo in 2019 and hung up his professional boots in summer 2021 and started a restaurant.
