= Freddy Coronel =

Paraguayan footballer (born 1989)

Personal information
- Full name: Freddy Javier Coronel Ortiz
- Date of birth: 22 July 1989 (age 37)
- Place of birth: Asunción, Paraguay
- Height: 1.76 m (5 ft 9 in)
- Position: Midfielder

Team information
- Current team: Independiente de Cauquenes
- Number: 6

Senior career*
Years	Team	Apps	(Gls)
2010	Libertad	2	(0)
2010	Sol de América	1	(0)
2011	Sportivo Luqueño	21	(0)
2012–2013	Rubio Ñu	43	(1)
2014	Sportivo Luqueño	11	(0)
2014–2015	Independiente Rivadavia	33	(0)
2016–2017	Akzhayik	53	(9)
2018–2019	Kyzylzhar	29	(2)
2019	General Díaz	2	(0)
2021	Rubio Ñu	0	(0)
2022–	Independiente de Cauquenes	6	(0)

International career
2009	Paraguay U20	8	(0)
- * Club domestic league appearances and goals as of 16 May 2022

Freddy Javier Coronel Ortiz (born 22 July 1989) is a Paraguayan footballer who plays as a midfielder for Independiente de Cauquenes in the Segunda División Profesional de Chile.

== Career ==
In January 2016, Coronel signed for Kazakhstan Premier League side Akzhayik.

== Career statistics ==
As of match played 11 November 2018

Appearances and goals by club, season and competition
Club	Season	League			National cup		Continental		Total	
Club	Season	Division	Apps	Goals	Apps	Goals	Apps	Goals	Apps	Goals
Libertad	2010	Paraguayan Primera División	2	0	–		0	0	2	0
Sol de América	2010	Paraguayan Primera División	1	0	–		–		1	0
Sportivo Luqueño	2011	Paraguayan Primera División	21	0	–		–		21	0
Rubio Ñu	2012	Paraguayan Primera División	19	1	–		–		19	1
Rubio Ñu	2013	Paraguayan Primera División	24	0	–		–		24	0
Rubio Ñu	Total		43	1	0	0	0	0	43	1
Sportivo Luqueño	2014	Paraguayan Primera División	11	0	–		–		11	0
Independiente Rivadavia	2014	Primera B Nacional	10	0	0	0	–		10	0
Independiente Rivadavia	2015	Primera B Nacional	23	0	2	0	–		25	0
Independiente Rivadavia	Total		33	0	2	0	0	0	35	0
Akzhayik	2016	Kazakhstan Premier League	32	8	0	0	–		32	8
Akzhayik	2017	Kazakhstan Premier League	21	1	0	0	–		21	1
Akzhayik	Total		53	9	0	0	0	0	53	9
Kyzylzhar	2018	Kazakhstan Premier League	29	2	1	0	–		30	2
Career total			193	12	3	0	0	0	196	12
