= Shota Grigalashvili =

Georgian footballer

Personal information
- Date of birth: 1 June 1986 (age 40)
- Place of birth: Tbilisi, Soviet Union
- Height: 1.73 m (5 ft 8 in)
- Position: Attacking midfielder

Youth career
- 2002–2004: FC Dinamo Tbilisi

Senior career*
Years	Team	Apps	(Gls)
2004–2006	Dinamo Tbilisi	18	(2)
2007–2008	Borjomi	23	(6)
2008–2009	Meskheti Akhaltsikhe	12	(2)
2009–2012	Zestafoni	104	(15)
2012	Dila Gori	5	(0)
2012	Alania Vladikavkaz	9	(0)
2013	SKA-Energiya Khabarovsk	10	(1)
2013–2014	Anorthosis Famagusta	31	(8)
2014	Omonia	9	(0)
2015	Nea Salamis Famagusta	1	(1)
2015–2016	Ethnikos Achna	28	(3)
2016	Irtysh Pavlodar	13	(3)
2017	Olmaliq	17	(1)
2018–2021	Kyzylzhar	56	(9)

International career
2003	Georgia U19	3	(0)
2004–2006	Georgia U21	12	(0)
2006–2013	Georgia	12	(0)
- * Club domestic league appearances and goals

Shota Grigalashvili (Georgian: შოთა გრიგალაშვილი; born 1 June 1986) is a Georgian former footballer who played as a midfielder. He is the older brother of Elgujja, also footballer.

== Career ==
=== Club ===
In 2007, Grigalashvili had a trial with German side FC Erzgebirge Aue, together with his fellow country-man Beka Gotsiridze. They were recommended by Klaus Toppmöller, then the national coach of Georgia. Both failed to impress.

On 24 June 2016, Grigalashvili signed for Kazakhstan Premier League side FC Irtysh Pavlodar. In January 2018, Grigalashvili returned to Kazakhstan, signing for FC Kyzylzhar.

=== International ===
Grigalashvili has been capped 12 times so far for his country, whilst also playing for the under-21 team.
