= Uroš Delić =

Montenegrin footballer

Personal information
- Full name: Uroš Delić
- Date of birth: 10 August 1987 (age 39)
- Place of birth: Nikšić, SFR Yugoslavia
- Height: 1.93 m (6 ft 4 in)
- Position: Central midfielder

Team information
- Current team: Kyzylzhar
- Number: 21

Youth career
- 1996–2000: Partizan
- 2001–2003: Milicionar Bogatić
- 2003–2005: Rad

Senior career*
Years	Team	Apps	(Gls)
2005–2011	Rad	93	(5)
2011–2013	Beerschot	16	(0)
2013	→ Eendracht Aalst (loan)	12	(1)
2013–2014	Rad	6	(0)
2014	Syrianska	13	(1)
2014	Koper	5	(1)
2015	AFC United	25	(0)
2016	Metalac Gornji Milanovac	10	(0)
2016–2017	Borac Čačak	28	(2)
2018–2019	Kyzylzhar	26	(1)
2019	Gol Gohar		
2020	Kyzylzhar	19	(0)
- * Club domestic league appearances and goals as of 5 September 2021

Uroš Delić (Serbian Cyrillic: Урош Делић; born 10 August 1987) is a Montenegrin retired footballer.

== Club career ==
=== Early career ===
Born in Nikšić, Uroš Delić began his career at nine years of age, in Partizan. He played there for four years, before he moved to FK Milicionar Bogatić where he played for two years.

=== Rad ===
In 2003, at the age of 16, Rad signed him to their youth system. He was the captain of the youth squad that won the national championship. In the season 2005–06 he made the debut for the senior team, and in the following years he has established himself in the squad and became one of the youngest team captains in club history. He played with Rad six consecutive seasons.

=== Beerschot AC ===
On 22 July 2011, Delić signed for Beerschot. In 2013, he played on loan at Eendracht Aalst.

=== Return to Rad ===
In September 2013 he returned to Rad.

=== Syrianska FC ===
In March 2014 he continued his international career in Sweden, signing for Syrianska. He played for Syrianska in Swedish Superettan league and was one of the most consistent players, showing a good performance in each game.

=== FC Koper ===
On 31 August 2014, Koper announced the signing of Uroš Delić from Syrianska. He made his competitive debut on 13 September in Slovenian PrvaLiga against Rudar Velenje, and scored his first goal for Koper on 18 October against Zavrč.
