= Aderinsola Eseola =

Ukrainian footballer

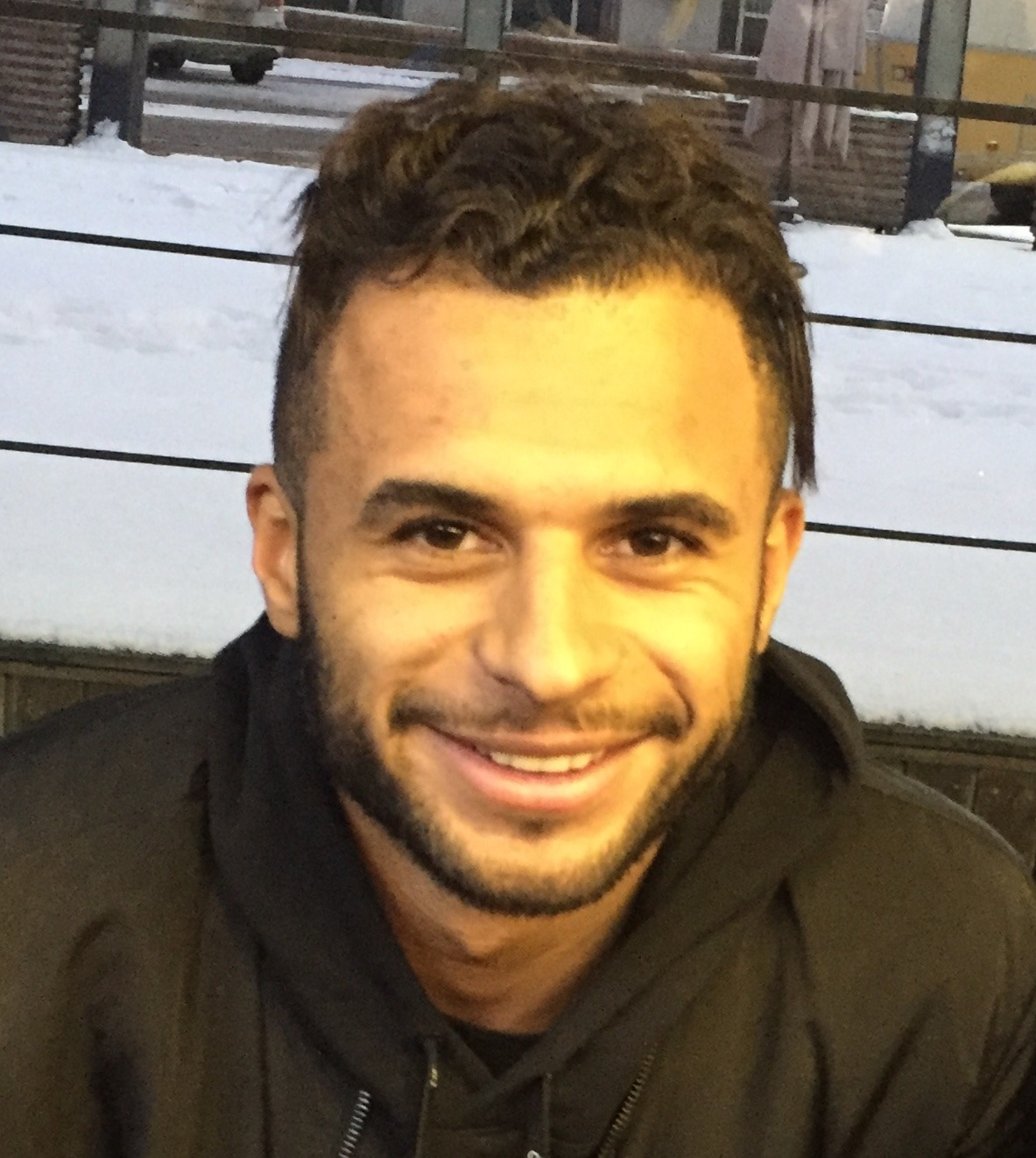

Personal information
- Full name: Aderinsola Khabib Eseola
- Date of birth: 28 June 1991 (age 35)
- Place of birth: Zhytomyr, Ukrainian SSR
- Height: 1.89 m (6 ft 2 in)
- Position: Forward

Youth career
- 2003–2004: Polissya Zhytomyr
- 2004–2008: Arsenal Kyiv

Senior career*
Years	Team	Apps	(Gls)
2009	CSKA Kyiv	10	(1)
2009–2010	Dynamo Kyiv	0	(0)
2010–2011	Virtus Soverato Calcio	24	(9)
2011–2012	HinterReggio	19	(4)
2012–2013	Vibonese	6	(0)
2013–2014	Polisportiva Isola Capo Rizzuto	6	(4)
2015	Desna Chernihiv	15	(5)
2016	Oleksandriya	2	(0)
2016	Arsenal Kyiv	16	(9)
2017–2018	Zirka Kropyvnytskyi	15	(1)
2017	→ Arsenal Kyiv (loan)	11	(7)
2018	→ Akzhayik (loan)	13	(8)
2018–2021	Kairat	69	(32)
2021	Vorskla Poltava	2	(0)
2022	Hebar Pazardzhik	15	(0)
2023	Lviv	8	(0)
2023–2024	Shturm Ivankiv	8	(0)
2024	UCSA Kyiv	8	(1)
Total		166	(63)

International career^{‡}
2006	Ukraine U17	4	(0)
- * Club domestic league appearances and goals as of 15 June 2024 ‡ National team caps and goals as of 25 July 2022

Aderinsola Khabib Eseola (Ukrainian: Адерінсола Хабіб Есеола; born 28 June 1991) is a Ukrainian professional footballer who plays as a striker.

== Career ==
His father is of Nigerian descent and his mother Ukrainian. He played for Polissya Zhytomyr and Dynamo Kyiv (reserves). In Autumn 2011 he moved to HinterReggio Calcio.

=== Desna Chernihiv ===
In 2015 he moved to Desna Chernihiv, the main club in Chernihiv in Ukrainian First League, where he played 15 matches and scored 5 goals.

=== Arsenal Kyiv (loan) ===
In 2017 he moved on loan to Arsenal Kyiv, where he played 11 matches and scored 7 goals.

=== Akzhayik (loan) ===
In 2018 he moved to Akzhayik on loan, where he played 13 matches and scored 8 goals.

=== Kairat ===
On 6 June 2018, Eseola signed an 18-month contract with FC Kairat, with the option of an additional year. On 14 November 2019, Eseola signed a new two-year contract with Kairat. He won the Kazakhstan Premier League in the season 2020.

=== Vorskla Poltava ===
In summer 2021 he moved to Vorskla Poltava in Ukrainian Premier League, where he played 2 matches and in January 2022 he left the club.

=== Hebar Pazardzhik ===
In July 2022, he signed for Hebar Pazardzhik. Here he played 15 matches and in December 2022 his contract with the club was terminated with mutual agreement.

=== Lviv ===
In January 2023 he signed for Lviv in Ukrainian Premier League.

=== UCSA ===
In 2024 he signed for UCSA in Ukrainian First League. In January 2025 he left the club.

== Career statistics ==
=== Club ===
As of match played 15 January 2025

Appearances and goals by club, season and competition
Club	Season	League			National Cup		Continental		Other		Total	
Club	Season	Division	Apps	Goals	Apps	Goals	Apps	Goals	Apps	Goals	Apps	Goals
Desna Chernihiv	2015–16	Ukrainian Premier League	15	5	1	0	–		–		16	5
Oleksandriya	2015–16	Ukrainian Premier League	2	0	1	0	–		–		3	0
Arsenal Kyiv	2016–17	Persha Liha	16	9	2	1	–		–		18	10
Zirka Kropyvnytskyi	2016–17	Persha Liha	10	1	0	0	–		–		10	1
Zirka Kropyvnytskyi	2017–18	Persha Liha	5	0	0	0	–		–		15	0
Zirka Kropyvnytskyi	Total		15	1	0	0	-	-	-	-	15	1
Arsenal Kyiv (loan)	2017–18	Persha Liha	11	7	2	0	–		–		13	7
Akzhayik (loan)	2018	Kazakhstan Premier League	13	8	0	0	–		–		13	8
Kairat	2018	Kazakhstan Premier League	16	9	0	0	6	3	0	0	22	12
Kairat	2019	Kazakhstan Premier League	27	19	0	0	4	2	1	0	32	21
Kairat	2020	Kazakhstan Premier League	17	2	0	0	2	1	-		19	3
Kairat	2021	Kazakhstan Premier League	3	1	0	0	0	0	2	0	5	1
Kairat	Total		63	31	0	0	12	8	1	0	78	37
Vorskla Poltava	2021-22	Ukrainian Premier League	2	0	0	0	0	0	0	0	2	0
Hebar Pazardzhik	2022-23	First League	15	0	0	0	0	0	0	0	15	0
Lviv	2022–23	Ukrainian Premier League	6	0	0	0	0	0	0	0	6	0
UCSA Kyiv	2023–24	Ukrainian First League	8	1	2	1	0	0	0	0	10	2
Career total			166	63	8	2	12	6	3	0	189	70

== Honours ==
=== Club ===
Kairat

- Kazakhstan Premier League: 2020
- Kazakhstan Cup: 2018, 2019
- Silver medalist: 2018, 2019

Individual

- Top Scorer Kazakhstan Premier League: 2019 (19 goals) with Marin Tomasov
