= Jaba Jighauri =

Georgian footballer

Personal information
- Full name: Jambul Jighauri
- Date of birth: 8 July 1992 (age 34)
- Place of birth: Tbilisi, Georgia
- Height: 1.75 m (5 ft 9 in)
- Position: Midfielder

Team information
- Current team: Qizilqum
- Number: 31

Youth career
- 2005–2010: Dinamo Tbilisi

Senior career*
Years	Team	Apps	(Gls)
2011–2016	Dinamo Tbilisi	81	(21)
2012–2013	→ Dinamo Tbilisi II	10	(4)
2013–2014	→ Chikhura (loan)	36	(9)
2017–2018	Vardar	28	(4)
2018	Aktobe	0	(0)
2018	→ Ordabasy (loan)	13	(3)
2018–2019	Grenoble	13	(0)
2019–2022	Dinamo Batumi	97	(35)
2023	FC Caspiy	10	(0)
2023–2024	Nasaf	32	(6)
2025–	Qizilqum	42	(3)

International career^{‡}
2011–2013	Georgia U21	12	(3)
2016–2023	Georgia	23	(0)
- * Club domestic league appearances and goals as of 29 July 2026 ‡ National team caps and goals as of 20 March 2023

Jambul "Jaba" Jighauri (Georgian: ჯამბულ "ჯაბა" ჯიღაური, romanized: jambul "jaba" jighauri, pronounced [dʒambul dʒaba dʒiɣauɾi]; born 8 July 1992) is a Georgian footballer who plays as a midfielder for Uzbekistan Super League club Qizilqum.

== Club career ==
Jigauri started his career with Dinamo Tbilisi, making his professional debut for the team on 22 May 2011 against Torpedo Kutaisi, and scoring a 55th-minute equaliser in a 1–2 loss at the Boris Paichadze Dinamo Arena.

On 14 January 2017, Jighauri signed for FK Vardar.

On 27 February 2018, Jighauri joined FC Aktobe in the Kazakhstan Premier League. The following week Jighauri moved to FC Ordabasy on loan until the summer transfer window, with Aleksandar Simčević going the opposite way.

On 18 July 2018, Jighauri signed a two-year contract with French Ligue 2 club Grenoble Foot 38.

On 20 July 2019, Jighauri signed a 1.5 year contract with Georgian Erovnuli Liga club Dinamo Batumi.

== International career ==
Jigauri played his first international match at the under-21 level on 3 June 2011 in 0–1 win against Croatia. In May 2016, he was called up to Georgia's senior team for the first time. He earned his first cap on the 27 May in a 3–1 loss to Slovakia, replacing Valeri Qazaishvili for the final 12 minutes in Wels, Austria.

== Honours ==
Dinamo Tbilisi

- Umaglesi Liga: 2012–13, 2015–16
- Georgian Cup: 2012–13, 2014–15, 2015–16
- Georgian Super Cup: 2015

Chikhura

- Georgian Super Cup: 2013
