= Serhiy Basov =

Ukrainian football defender

Personal information
- Full name: Serhiy Hermanovych Basov
- Date of birth: 19 January 1987 (age 39)
- Place of birth: Artsyz, Ukrainian SSR
- Height: 1.84 m (6 ft 1/2 in)
- Position: Defender

Youth career
- 2000–2001: Torpedo Zaporizhzhia
- 2001–2002: FC Dynamo Zaporizhzhia
- 2002–2003: Torpedo Zaporizhzhia
- 2003: Metalurh Zaporizhzhia
- 2003–2004: Torpedo Zaporizhzhia

Senior career*
| Years | Team | Apps | (Gls) |
| 2007–2009 | Tytan Donetsk | 63 | (2) |
| 2009–2010 | Zirka Kirovohrad | 29 | (4) |
| 2010–2012 | Bukovyna Chernivtsi | 52 | (9) |
| 2012–2017 | Oleksandriya | 129 | (6) |
| 2018–2020 | Akzhayik | 32 | (0) |
| 2020 | Atyrau | 10 | (1) |
| 2021–2023 | Metalurh Zaporizhzhia | 66 | (4) |
- * Club domestic league appearances and goals as of 1 March 2024

Serhiy Basov (Ukrainian: Сергій Германович Басов; born 19 January 1987) is a Ukrainian football defender.

== Career ==
Basov is a product of the Zaporizhia youth sportive school systems.

He played in the Ukrainian Second League (FC Tytan Donetsk) and in the Ukrainian First League (FC Zirka Kirovohrad, FC Bukovyna Chernivtsi, FC Oleksandriya) clubs. In Summer 2015 he was promoted with FC Oleksandriya to the Ukrainian Premier League.
