= Hrvoje Spahija =

Croatian footballer

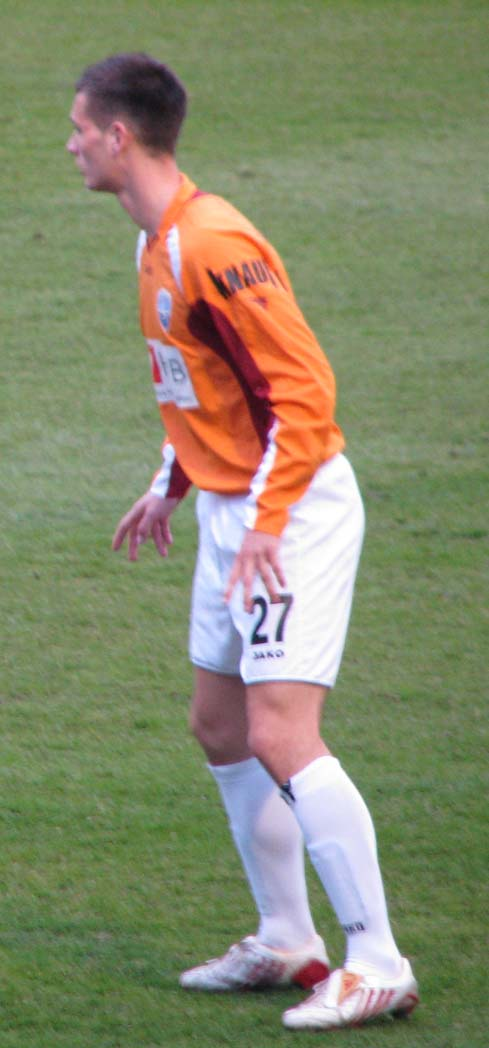
- Spahija with Šibenik in 2009

Personal information
- Date of birth: 23 March 1988 (age 38)
- Place of birth: Šibenik, SFR Yugoslavia
- Height: 1.90 m (6 ft 3 in)
- Position: Centre-back

Team information
- Current team: Vodice
- Number: 4

Youth career
- 2002–2007: Šibenik

Senior career*
| Years | Team | Apps | (Gls) |
| 2007–2012 | Šibenik | 60 | (3) |
| 2007–2008 | → Zagora Unešić (loan) | 21 | (0) |
| 2012–2013 | Elazığspor | 2 | (0) |
| 2014 | Šibenik | 0 | (0) |
| 2014–2015 | Olimpija Ljubljana | 7 | (0) |
| 2015–2017 | Voluntari | 39 | (4) |
| 2017–2019 | Universitatea Craiova | 9 | (0) |
| 2018 | → Ordabasy (loan) | 14 | (0) |
| 2019 | Universitatea II Craiova | 8 | (2) |
| 2020 | Zagora Unešić | | |
| 2020– | Vodice | | |
- * Club domestic league appearances and goals as of 29 January 2019

Hrvoje Spahija (born 23 March 1988, in Šibenik) is a Croatian footballer who plays as a defender for NK Vodice.

== Club career ==
A centre-back, Spahija, a native of Šibenik, Croatia, passed through the youth ranks of his hometown club HNK Šibenik. He saw his first senior minutes playing for NK Zagora Unešić on a one-year loan, before returning to Šibenik where he would play for the following four seasons. Mostly a substitute initially, behind more experienced players like Igor Budiša, Velimir Vidić, Marko Kartelo, Tarik Cerić etc., even coming in play positions alien to him, he saw more first team action in his last two seasons in Šibenik, when was then made team captain by the coach Goran Tomić. While Šibenik was relegated after the 2011–2012 season, his games earned him a transfer to the newly promoted Turkish Süper Lig side Elazığspor, where he debuted in a 1–1 draw vs. Fenerbahçe.

== Honours ==
=== Club ===
Voluntari

- Cupa României: 2016–17
