= List of Kazakhstan football transfers winter 2016 =

This is a list of Kazakh football transfers in the winter transfer window 2016 by club. Only clubs of the 2016 Kazakhstan Premier League are included.

== Kazakhstan Premier League 2016 ==
=== Aktobe ===
In: Note: Flags indicate national team as defined under FIFA eligibility rules; some limited exceptions apply. Players may hold more than one non-FIFA nationality.

No.	Pos.	Nation	Player
2	MF	RUS	Marat Sitdikov (from (Russia) Dnepr Smolensk)
3	DF	CIV	Kouassi Kouadja (from (Belarus) Slutsk)
5	DF	KAZ	Bagdat Kairov
6	MF	KAZ	Viktor Kryukov (from (Kazakhstan) Okzhetpes)
8	DF	KAZ	Samat Smakov (from (Kazakhstan) Irtysh Pavlodar)
9	MF	KAZ	Abylaykhan Totay (from (Kazakhstan) Irtysh Pavlodar)
11	MF	UZB	Bobir Davlatov (loan from (Russia) Rubin Kazan)
14	DF	RUS	Sandro Tsveiba (from (Croatia) Osijek)
17	MF	KAZ	Nurbol Zhumashev
19	FW	KAZ	Sergey Lisenkov
21	DF	KAZ	Yegor Azovskiy (from (Kazakhstan) Okzhetpes)
22	MF	KAZ	Kirill Shestakov (from (Kazakhstan) Kaisar)
24	FW	RUS	Mikhail Petrolay (loan from (Russia) Rubin Kazan)
29	FW	KAZ	Toktar Zhangylyshbay (from (Kazakhstan) Astana)
32	GK	KAZ	Samat Otarbayev (from (Kazakhstan) Ordabasy)
37	MF	KAZ	Islambek Kulekenov (from (Kazakhstan) Astana)
47	MF	KAZ	Aslanbek Kakimov
69	MF	RUS	Nikita Bocharov (from (Russia) Tom-2 Tomsk)
—	MF	RUS	Yegor Sorokin (loan from (Russia) Rubin Kazan)
—	FW	KAZ	Murat Tleshev (from (Kazakhstan) Atyrau)
—	FW	UKR	Ilya Mikhalyov (from (Ukraine) Karpaty Lviv)

Out: Note: Flags indicate national team as defined under FIFA eligibility rules; some limited exceptions apply. Players may hold more than one non-FIFA nationality.

No.	Pos.	Nation	Player
1	GK	KAZ	Stas Pokatilov (to (Russia) Rostov)
2	DF	NGA	Dele Adeleye
3	DF	KAZ	Valeri Korobkin (to (Kazakhstan) Atyrau)
5	MF	LTU	Artūras Žulpa (to (Kazakhstan) Tobol)
7	DF	KAZ	Dmitri Miroshnichenko (to (Kazakhstan) Tobol)
8	DF	KAZ	Viktor Dmitrenko (to (Kazakhstan) Tobol)
10	MF	KAZ	Marat Khayrullin (to (Kazakhstan) Okzhetpes)
11	FW	BRA	Danilo Neco
12	DF	TRI	Robert Primus (to (Trinidad and Tobago) Morvant Caledonia United)
17	MF	KAZ	Askhat Tagybergen (to (Kazakhstan) Astana)
20	MF	ROU	Ciprian Deac (to (Kazakhstan) Tobol)
23	DF	KAZ	Yuriy Logvinenko (to (Kazakhstan) Astana)
34	MF	ARM	Marcos Pizzelli (to (Saudi Arabia) Al-Raed)
55	DF	BRA	Anderson Santana
91	FW	KAZ	Sergey Khizhnichenko (to (Kazakhstan) Tobol)
99	FW	BRA	Danilo (to (Thailand) Buriram United)

=== Akzhayik ===
In: Note: Flags indicate national team as defined under FIFA eligibility rules; some limited exceptions apply. Players may hold more than one non-FIFA nationality.

No.	Pos.	Nation	Player
6	DF	SRB	Saša Kolunija (from (Serbia) Zemun)
16	MF	PAR	Freddy Coronel (from (Argentina) Independiente Rivadavia)
23	DF	KAZ	Zakhar Korobov (from (Kazakhstan) Irtysh Pavlodar)
24	FW	KAZ	Kuanysh Begalin (loan from (Kazakhstan) Irtysh Pavlodar)
28	FW	KAZ	Sergey Gridin (from (Kazakhstan) Okzhetpes)
33	MF	KAZ	Eduard Sergienko (from (Kazakhstan) Taraz)
55	MF	SRB	Predrag Govedarica (from (Serbia) Bežanija)
83	DF	SRB	Danilo Nikolić

Out: Note: Flags indicate national team as defined under FIFA eligibility rules; some limited exceptions apply. Players may hold more than one non-FIFA nationality.

No.	Pos.	Nation	Player
3	DF	BUL	Yanko Valkanov (to (Bulgaria) Botev Galabovo)
6	FW	KAZ	Magamed Uzdenov
10	FW	KAZ	Akzhol Serikzhanov
35	GK	KAZ	Andrey Neupokoev
90	MF	SVN	Matic Maruško (to (Kazakhstan) Kaisar)

=== Astana ===
In: Note: Flags indicate national team as defined under FIFA eligibility rules; some limited exceptions apply. Players may hold more than one non-FIFA nationality.

No.	Pos.	Nation	Player
2	MF	KAZ	Askhat Tagybergen (from (Kazakhstan) Aktobe)
3	DF	KAZ	Mark Gorman (from (Kazakhstan) Kairat)
8	MF	KAZ	Gevorg Najaryan
10	FW	SRB	Đorđe Despotović (from (Serbia) Red Star Belgrade)
13	DF	KAZ	Berik Shaikhov (from (Kazakhstan) Irtysh Pavlodar)
16	MF	MKD	Besart Abdurahimi (loan from (Belgium) Lokeren)
20	MF	NGA	Lukman Haruna (loan from (Ukraine) Dynamo Kyiv)
27	DF	KAZ	Yuriy Logvinenko (from (Kazakhstan) Aktobe)
35	GK	KAZ	Aleksandr Mokin (from (Kazakhstan) Shakhter Karagandy)
47	GK	KAZ	Abylaikhan Duysen (from (Kazakhstan) Bayterek)

Out: Note: Flags indicate national team as defined under FIFA eligibility rules; some limited exceptions apply. Players may hold more than one non-FIFA nationality.

No.	Pos.	Nation	Player
2	DF	KAZ	Yeldos Akhmetov (to (Kazakhstan) Irtysh Pavlodar)
8	MF	KAZ	Georgy Zhukov (loan return to (Belgium) Standard Liège)
10	MF	CTA	Foxi Kéthévoama (to (Turkey) Gaziantep B.B.)
12	DF	KAZ	Igor Pikalkin (to (Kazakhstan) Shakhter Karagandy)
19	MF	KAZ	Alexei Rodionov
20	MF	KAZ	Zhakyp Kozhamberdi (to (Kazakhstan) Okzhetpes)
22	FW	KAZ	Bauyrzhan Dzholchiyev
24	MF	UKR	Denys Dedechko (to (Ukraine) Oleksandriya)
31	MF	KAZ	Islambek Kulekenov (to (Kazakhstan) Aktobe)
33	DF	SVN	Branko Ilić (to (Japan) Urawa Red Diamonds)
85	GK	KAZ	Vladimir Loginovsky (loan to (Kazakhstan) Tobol)
89	FW	COD	Junior Kabananga (loan to (Turkey) Kardemir Karabükspor)
—	MF	KAZ	Rinat Khayrullin (to (Latvia) Spartaks Jūrmala)
—	MF	KAZ	Ulan Konysbayev (to (Kazakhstan) Atyrau)
—	MF	KAZ	Vladislav Mendybayev
—	MF	KAZ	Toktar Zhangylyshbay (to (Kazakhstan) Aktobe)

=== Atyrau ===
In: Note: Flags indicate national team as defined under FIFA eligibility rules; some limited exceptions apply. Players may hold more than one non-FIFA nationality.

No.	Pos.	Nation	Player
2	DF	KAZ	Aldan Baltaev (from (Kazakhstan) Kaisar)
3	DF	KAZ	Aleksei Muldarov (from (Kazakhstan) Shakhter Karagandy)
10	MF	KAZ	Pavel Shabalin (from (Kazakhstan) Okzhetpes)
11	MF	UKR	Vyacheslav Sharpar (from (Ukraine) Volyn Lutsk)
13	FW	BLR	Alyaksandr Makas (from (Kazakhstan) Minsk)
17	MF	KAZ	Ulan Konysbayev (from (Kazakhstan) Astana)
19	MF	KAZ	Valeri Korobkin (from (Kazakhstan) Aktobe)
21	DF	MKD	Aleksandar Damčevski
26	FW	POL	Przemysław Trytko (from (Kazakhstan) Korona Kielce)
30	MF	ROU	Alexandru Curtean (from (Romania) Poli Timișoara)
33	DF	FRA	Abdel Lamanje (from (Russia) Shinnik Yaroslavl)
35	GK	KAZ	Ramil Nurmukhametov (from (Kazakhstan) Kaisar)

Out: Note: Flags indicate national team as defined under FIFA eligibility rules; some limited exceptions apply. Players may hold more than one non-FIFA nationality.

No.	Pos.	Nation	Player
1	GK	KAZ	Ilya Bayteryakov
5	MF	KAZ	Bekzhan Onzhan
10	MF	KAZ	Konstantin Zarechny
11	MF	KAZ	Maksat Baizhanov (to (Kazakhstan) Shakhter Karagandy)
20	DF	NGA	Michael Odibe (to (Romania) Concordia Chiajna)
21	MF	KAZ	Aleksei Marov
22	MF	SEN	Abdoulaye Diakate (to (Kazakhstan) Ordabasy)
23	DF	RUS	Anton Grigoryev
24	FW	UKR	Ruslan Fomin (to (Greece) Apollon Smyrnis)
29	DF	KAZ	Berik Aitbayev (to (Kazakhstan) Taraz)
39	FW	KAZ	Murat Tleshev (to (Kazakhstan) Aktobe)
66	DF	KAZ	Anton Chichulin (to (Kazakhstan) Okzhetpes)
85	MF	BLR	Dmitri Parkhachev (to (Belarus) Gorodeya)
91	DF	KAZ	Azamat Izbasarov
99	FW	MNE	Ivan Ivanović (to (Montenegro) Rudar Pljevlja)

=== Irtysh ===
In: Note: Flags indicate national team as defined under FIFA eligibility rules; some limited exceptions apply. Players may hold more than one non-FIFA nationality.

No.	Pos.	Nation	Player
2	DF	KAZ	Yeldos Akhmetov (from (Kazakhstan) Astana)
4	DF	LTU	Georgas Freidgeimas (loan from (Lithuania) Žalgiris Vilnius)
5	DF	BIH	Semir Kerla (from (Lithuania) Žalgiris Vilnius)
7	MF	GEO	Gogita Gogua (from (Georgia (country)) Dila Gori)
9	FW	SEN	Baye Djiby Fall (from (Turkey) Karşıyaka)
10	FW	CHI	Ignacio Herrera (from (Chile) Deportes Iquique)
27	DF	KAZ	Serhiy Malyi (from (Kazakhstan) Ordabasy)
40	MF	POR	Carlos Fonseca (from (Bulgaria) Slavia Sofia, previously on loan)
45	FW	KAZ	Roman Murtazayev (from (Kazakhstan) Shakhter Karagandy)
99	FW	GAM	Ousman Jallow (from (Finland) HJK)
—	DF	KAZ	Aleksandr Kirov
—	FW	TRI	Lester Peltier (from (Slovakia) Slovan Bratislava)

Out: Note: Flags indicate national team as defined under FIFA eligibility rules; some limited exceptions apply. Players may hold more than one non-FIFA nationality.

No.	Pos.	Nation	Player
2	DF	KAZ	Vladimir Sedelnikov
3	DF	KAZ	Vladislav Chernyshov
8	MF	KAZ	Samat Smakov (to (Kazakhstan) Aktobe)
11	FW	KAZ	Yerkebulan Nurgaliyev
13	DF	KAZ	Berik Shaikhov (to (Kazakhstan) Astana)
14	MF	KAZ	Azat Ersalimov
17	MF	KAZ	Abylaykhan Totay (to (Kazakhstan) Aktobe)
21	GK	KAZ	Nikita Kalmykov
22	DF	KAZ	Dmitri Rybalko (loan to (Kazakhstan) Makhtaaral)
23	DF	KAZ	Zakhar Korobov (to (Kazakhstan) Akzhayik)
24	FW	KAZ	Kuanysh Begalin (loan to (Kazakhstan) Akzhayik)
30	FW	UKR	Kostyantyn Dudchenko (to (Kazakhstan) Tobol)
32	GK	KAZ	Denis Tolebayev
50	DF	CTA	Fernander Kassaï (loan return to (Bulgaria) Slavia Sofia)
60	FW	BRA	Evandro Roncatto (to (Brazil) Rio Branco)
80	MF	FRA	Alassane N'Diaye (to (Kazakhstan) Tobol)
90	DF	BRA	Antonio Ferreira (to (Brazil) Mirassol)
—	DF	KAZ	Igor Nazarov (loan to (Kazakhstan) Kaisar)
—	DF	KAZ	Nursultan Alibayov (loan to (Kazakhstan) Ekibastuz)
—	DF	KAZ	Dauren Orymbay (loan to (Kazakhstan) Ekibastuz)
—	MF	KAZ	Bagdat Urazaliev (loan to (Kazakhstan) Ekibastuz)
—	MF	KAZ	Yuri Chifin (loan to (Kazakhstan) Ekibastuz)
—	FW	KAZ	Muratkhan Zeynollin (loan to (Kazakhstan) Shakhter Karagandy)
—	FW	TRI	Lester Peltier

=== Kairat ===
In: Note: Flags indicate national team as defined under FIFA eligibility rules; some limited exceptions apply. Players may hold more than one non-FIFA nationality.

No.	Pos.	Nation	Player
3	MF	KAZ	Jan Vorogovsky (from (Kazakhstan) Kaisar)
5	MF	SVK	Lukáš Tesák (from (Russia) Arsenal Tula)
16	GK	KAZ	Andrei Sidelnikov (from (Kazakhstan) Ordabasy)
20	MF	CMR	Léandre Tawamba (from (Slovakia) ViOn)
28	MF	RUS	Andrey Arshavin (from (Russia) Kuban Krasnodar)

Out: Note: Flags indicate national team as defined under FIFA eligibility rules; some limited exceptions apply. Players may hold more than one non-FIFA nationality.

No.	Pos.	Nation	Player
3	DF	RUS	Zaurbek Pliyev (to (Russia) Terek Grozny)
5	DF	KAZ	Mark Gorman (to (Kazakhstan) Astana)
14	FW	KAZ	Bauyrzhan Baitana (to (Kazakhstan) Taraz)
15	FW	ESP	Sito Riera
16	GK	KAZ	Serhiy Tkachuk (to (Kazakhstan) Shakhter Karagandy)
22	MF	BRA	Serginho (to (Brazil) Ceará)
25	MF	KAZ	Oybek Baltabayev
26	DF	KAZ	Bauyrzhan Tanirbergenov
27	MF	KAZ	Ulan Konysbayev (loan return to (Kazakhstan) Astana)
28	FW	SRB	Đorđe Despotović (loan return to (Serbia) Red Star Belgrade)
29	FW	KAZ	Toktar Zhangylyshbay (loan return to (Kazakhstan) Astana)

=== Okzhetpes ===
In: Note: Flags indicate national team as defined under FIFA eligibility rules; some limited exceptions apply. Players may hold more than one non-FIFA nationality.

No.	Pos.	Nation	Player
5	MF	KAZ	Anatoli Bogdanov (from (Kazakhstan) Tobol)
7	FW	KAZ	Sanat Zhumahanov (from (Kazakhstan) Taraz)
9	MF	SRB	Risto Ristović (from (Serbia) Voždovac)
14	MF	KAZ	Igor Yurin (from (Kazakhstan) Tobol)
19	MF	KAZ	Marat Khayrullin (from (Kazakhstan) Aktobe)
21	MF	KAZ	Zhakyp Kozhamberdi (to (Kazakhstan) Astana)
24	GK	KAZ	Dzhurakhon Babakhanov (from (Kazakhstan) Taraz)
29	MF	CMR	Joseph Nane (from (United States) San Antonio Scorpions)
30	GK	SRB	Saša Stamenković (from (Greece) Kerkyra)
33	FW	KAZ	Zhasulan Moldakaraev (from (Kazakhstan) Kaisar)
66	DF	KAZ	Anton Chichulin (from (Kazakhstan) Atyrau)
88	FW	CMR	Serge Bando N'Ganbe (from (France) Villefranche)

Out: Note: Flags indicate national team as defined under FIFA eligibility rules; some limited exceptions apply. Players may hold more than one non-FIFA nationality.

No.	Pos.	Nation	Player
1	GK	KAZ	Yaroslav Baginskiy (to (Kazakhstan) Shakhter Karagandy)
3	DF	KAZ	Yegor Azovskiy (to (Kazakhstan) Aktobe)
7	MF	KAZ	Ruslan Sakhalbayev
8	MF	KAZ	Yerkin Nurzhanov
14	DF	KAZ	Viktor Kryukov (to (Kazakhstan) Aktobe)
17	MF	BLR	Alyaksandr Pawlaw (to (Belarus) Shakhtyor Soligorsk)
18	MF	KAZ	Ruslan Kenetayev
19	MF	KAZ	Daniyar Nukebay
20	GK	KAZ	Anton Tsirin (to (Kazakhstan) Irtysh Pavlodar)
22	DF	CZE	Michal Smejkal (loan return to (Czech Republic) Mladá Boleslav)
24	DF	KAZ	Aleksandr Marochkin (to (Kazakhstan) Kaisar)
26	FW	RUS	Dmitri Sychev (loan return to from (Russia) Lokomotiv Moscow)
27	MF	KAZ	Pavel Shabalin (to (Kazakhstan) Atyrau)
28	FW	KAZ	Sergey Gridin (to (Kazakhstan) Akzhayik)
29	MF	SRB	Ivan Cvetković (to (Serbia) Jagodina)
45	MF	MNE	Luka Rotković (to (Belarus) Dinamo Minsk)

=== Ordabasy ===
In: Note: Flags indicate national team as defined under FIFA eligibility rules; some limited exceptions apply. Players may hold more than one non-FIFA nationality.

No.	Pos.	Nation	Player
1	GK	KAZ	Almat Bekbaev (from (Kazakhstan) Aktobe)
6	MF	NGA	Dominic Chatto (from (Norway) Bodø/Glimt)
9	FW	MNE	Filip Kasalica (from (Croatia) Istra 1961)
14	MF	KAZ	Farkhadbek Irismetov (from (Kazakhstan) Kaisar)
22	MF	SEN	Abdoulaye Diakate (from (Kazakhstan) Atyrau)
84	FW	SRB	Miloš Trifunović (from (Australia) Newcastle Jets)
—	GK	KAZ	Kirill Korotkevich (from (Kazakhstan) Tobol)

Out: Note: Flags indicate national team as defined under FIFA eligibility rules; some limited exceptions apply. Players may hold more than one non-FIFA nationality.

No.	Pos.	Nation	Player
1	GK	KAZ	Samat Otarbayev (to (Kazakhstan) Aktobe)
12	MF	UKR	Artem Kasyanov (to (Ukraine) Metalist Kharkiv)
22	MF	KAZ	Rauan Sariev
25	DF	KAZ	Serhiy Malyi (to (Kazakhstan) Irtysh Pavlodar)
26	MF	UKR	Kyrylo Petrov (to (Ukraine) Olimpik Donetsk)
40	FW	BIH	Ivan Božić (to (Croatia) Šibenik)
55	GK	KAZ	Andrei Sidelnikov (to (Kazakhstan) Kairat)
89	FW	KAZ	Sanjar Abdimanap

=== Shakhter Karagandy ===
In: Note: Flags indicate national team as defined under FIFA eligibility rules; some limited exceptions apply. Players may hold more than one non-FIFA nationality.

No.	Pos.	Nation	Player
1	MF	KAZ	Yaroslav Baginskiy (from (Kazakhstan) Okzhetpes)
5	DF	ARM	Robert Arzumanyan (loan from (Russia) Amkar Perm)
7	MF	NED	Desley Ubbink (from (Kazakhstan) Tobol)
10	MF	FIN	Erfan Zeneli (from (Finland) HJK)
11	MF	KAZ	Maksat Baizhanov (from (Kazakhstan) Atyrau)
20	DF	BLR	Ivan Sadownichy (from (Kazakhstan) Tobol)
24	DF	UKR	Oleksiy Kurylov (from (Ukraine) Metalist Kharkiv)
25	GK	KAZ	Serhiy Tkachuk (from (Kazakhstan) Kairat)
27	MF	SVK	Július Szöke (from (Slovakia) Podbrezová)
34	DF	KAZ	Igor Pikalkin (from (Kazakhstan) Astana)
77	DF	KAZ	Yevgeni Goryachi (from (Kazakhstan) Zhetysu)
97	MF	FIN	Moshtagh Yaghoubi (loan from (Latvia) Spartaks Jūrmala)

Out: Note: Flags indicate national team as defined under FIFA eligibility rules; some limited exceptions apply. Players may hold more than one non-FIFA nationality.

No.	Pos.	Nation	Player
3	DF	KAZ	Alexey Muldarov (to (Kazakhstan) Atyrau)
4	DF	BIH	Nikola Vasiljević (to (Bosnia and Herzegovina) Drina Zvornik)
6	MF	KAZ	Andrei Karpovich (to (Kazakhstan) Altai Semey)
9	MF	AUT	Mihret Topčagić (to (Austria) Rheindorf Altach)
10	FW	UKR	Maksym Feshchuk (to (Moldova) Dacia Chișinău)
13	GK	KAZ	Alexander Zarutsky
17	DF	BLR	Andrey Paryvayew (to (Belarus) Isloch Minsk Raion)
20	DF	BIH	Aldin Đidić (to (Bosnia and Herzegovina) Čelik Zenica)
23	MF	KAZ	Yevgeny Kostrub (to (Kazakhstan) Altai Semey)
24	FW	CZE	Jan Vošahlík (to (Czech Republic) 1. FK Příbram)
35	GK	KAZ	Aleksandr Mokin (to (Kazakhstan) Astana)
45	FW	KAZ	Roman Murtazayev (to (Kazakhstan) Irtysh Pavlodar)
52	DF	TRI	Aubrey David (to (Costa Rica) Deportivo Saprissa)
70	MF	BUL	Plamen Dimov (to (Kazakhstan) Altai Semey)

=== Taraz ===
In: Note: Flags indicate national team as defined under FIFA eligibility rules; some limited exceptions apply. Players may hold more than one non-FIFA nationality.

No.	Pos.	Nation	Player
6	MF	KAZ	Marat Shakhmetov (from (Kazakhstan) Zhetysu)
8	MF	KAZ	Vitaliy Evstigneev
10	FW	KAZ	Bauyrzhan Baitana (from (Kazakhstan) Kairat)
13	FW	SEN	Malick Mané (from (Sweden) IFK Göteborg)
14	DF	KAZ	Berik Aitbayev (from (Kazakhstan) Atyrau)
16	GK	SRB	Dušan Đokić
17	DF	KAZ	Oleg Nedashkovsky (from (Kazakhstan) Tobol)
78	FW	BLR	Ihar Zyankovich (from (Kazakhstan) Tobol)
—	MF	KAZ	Farukh Mirsalimbaev (from (Kazakhstan) Bayterek)
—	FW	KAZ	Denis Andreev (from (Kazakhstan) CSKA Almaty)

Out: Note: Flags indicate national team as defined under FIFA eligibility rules; some limited exceptions apply. Players may hold more than one non-FIFA nationality.

No.	Pos.	Nation	Player
3	MF	UKR	Dmytro Bashlay (to (Ukraine) Olimpik Donetsk)
7	MF	KAZ	Eduard Sergienko (to (Kazakhstan) Akzhayik)
9	FW	KAZ	Sanat Zhumahanov (to (Kazakhstan) Okzhetpes)
13	FW	NGA	Izu Azuka (to (Turkey) Yeni Malatyaspor)
14	DF	UKR	Denis Vasiljev
17	FW	UKR	Oleksandr Pyschur (to (Uzbekistan) Metallurg Bekabad)
23	MF	KAZ	Timur Dosmagambetov (to (Kazakhstan) Tobol)
24	GK	KAZ	Dzhurakhon Babakhanov (to (Kazakhstan) Okzhetpes)
27	FW	UKR	Oleksandr Yarovenko (to (Autonomous Republic of Crimea) Rubin Yalta)
30	MF	KAZ	Evgeniy Averchenko (to (Kazakhstan) Kyzylzhar)
44	MF	KAZ	Adilet Abdenabi
71	MF	RUS	Alan Gatagov (to (Estonia) Levadia Tallinn)
77	MF	RUS	Almir Mukhutdinov (to (Kazakhstan) Tobol)
—	MF	NED	Desley Ubbink (to (Kazakhstan) Shakhter Karagandy)

=== Tobol ===
In: Note: Flags indicate national team as defined under FIFA eligibility rules; some limited exceptions apply. Players may hold more than one non-FIFA nationality.

No.	Pos.	Nation	Player
1	GK	KAZ	Vladimir Loginovsky (loan from (Kazakhstan) Astana)
4	DF	CTA	Fernander Kassaï (from (Bulgaria) Slavia Sofia, previously on loan to (Kazakhstan) Irtysh Pavlodar)
5	MF	LTU	Artūras Žulpa (from (Kazakhstan) Aktobe)
6	DF	KAZ	Rakhimzhan Rozybakiev (from (Kazakhstan) Kaisar)
7	MF	KAZ	Timur Dosmagambetov (from (Kazakhstan) Taraz)
8	DF	KAZ	Viktor Dmitrenko (from (Kazakhstan) Aktobe)
11	MF	KAZ	Raul Jalilov (from (Kazakhstan) Bolat)
14	MF	KAZ	Olzhas Ilyasov (from (Kazakhstan) Bayterek)
14	FW	UKR	Kostyantyn Dudchenko (from (Kazakhstan) Irtysh Pavlodar)
17	DF	KAZ	Dmitri Miroshnichenko (from (Kazakhstan) Aktobe)
22	MF	ROU	Ciprian Deac (from (Kazakhstan) Aktobe)
25	MF	FRA	Alassane N'Diaye (from (Kazakhstan) Irtysh Pavlodar)
77	MF	RUS	Almir Mukhutdinov (from (Kazakhstan) Taraz)
91	FW	KAZ	Sergei Khizhnichenko (from (Kazakhstan) Aktobe)

Out: Note: Flags indicate national team as defined under FIFA eligibility rules; some limited exceptions apply. Players may hold more than one non-FIFA nationality.

No.	Pos.	Nation	Player
1	GK	KAZ	Kirill Korotkevich (to (Kazakhstan) Ordabasy)
5	MF	KAZ	Anatoli Bogdanov (to (Kazakhstan) Okzhetpes)
7	MF	KAZ	Artem Deli
8	MF	SRB	Nenad Šljivić (to (Serbia) Spartak Subotica)
10	FW	MDA	Igor Bugaiov
11	MF	SRB	Ognjen Krasić (to (Serbia) Voždovac)
12	DF	KAZ	Ermek Nurgaliyev
13	DF	KAZ	Islam Shadukayev
14	MF	KAZ	Igor Yurin (to (Kazakhstan) Okzhetpes)
15	FW	NGA	Uche Kalu (to (Turkey) Adanaspor)
17	MF	KAZ	Oleg Nedashkovsky
20	DF	BLR	Ivan Sadownichy (to (Kazakhstan) Shakhter Karagandy)
24	DF	LTU	Arūnas Klimavičius (to (Lithuania) Trakai)
77	GK	KAZ	Arslan Satubaldin
78	FW	BLR	Ihar Zyankovich (to (Kazakhstan) Taraz)
99	FW	LTU	Deivydas Matulevičius (to (Romania) Botoșani)

=== Zhetysu ===
In: Note: Flags indicate national team as defined under FIFA eligibility rules; some limited exceptions apply. Players may hold more than one non-FIFA nationality.

No.	Pos.	Nation	Player
7	FW	BLR	Filip Rudzik (from (Belarus) Shakhtyor Soligorsk)
11	MF	KAZ	Vadim Borovskiy (from (Kazakhstan) Kyzylzhar)
14	MF	MKD	Gjorgji Mojsov (from (North Macedonia) Renova)
22	MF	KAZ	Ilia Kalinin (from (Kazakhstan) Kaisar)
24	FW	MKD	Marko Simonovski (from (Croatia) RNK Split)
27	DF	KAZ	Andrey Shabaev (from (Kazakhstan) Vostok)
44	DF	CZE	Martin Klein (from (Kazakhstan) Kaisar)
57	DF	CIV	Didier Kadio (from (Finland) FF Jaro)
86	MF	SRB	Marko Đalović (from (Serbia) Novi Pazar)
87	FW	CIV	Boti Goa (from (Georgia (country)) Guria Lanchkhuti)

Out: Note: Flags indicate national team as defined under FIFA eligibility rules; some limited exceptions apply. Players may hold more than one non-FIFA nationality.

No.	Pos.	Nation	Player
4	DF	TJK	Davron Ergashev (to (Tajikistan) Istiklol)
5	MF	KAZ	Marat Shakhmetov (to (Kazakhstan) Taraz)
6	FW	RUS	Mikhail Petrolay (loan return to (Russia) Rubin Kazan)
7	MF	KAZ	Sayat Sariyev
11	MF	KAZ	Marlan Muzhikov
14	DF	KAZ	Yevgeni Goryachi (to (Kazakhstan) Shakhter Karagandy)
16	GK	KAZ	Rimas Martinkus
19	MF	UZB	Bobir Davlyatov (loan return to (Russia) Rubin Kazan)
21	FW	AZE	Elbeyi Guliyev (loan return to (Russia) Ural)
22	GK	KAZ	Erik Duysenbekuly
23	FW	RUS	Ruslan Galiakberov (loan return to (Russia) Rubin Kazan)
88	DF	RUS	Aleksei Gerasimov (loan return to (Russia) Ural)
91	MF	RUS	Ilsur Samigullin (loan return to (Russia) Rubin Kazan)
