= List of Kazakhstan football transfers winter 2016–17 =

This is a list of Kazakh football transfers in the winter transfer window 2017 by club. Only clubs of the 2017 Kazakhstan Premier League are included.

== Kazakhstan Premier League 2017 ==
=== Aktobe ===
In: Note: Flags indicate national team as defined under FIFA eligibility rules; some limited exceptions apply. Players may hold more than one non-FIFA nationality.

No.	Pos.	Nation	Player
2	DF	KAZ	Rafkat Aslan (from (Kazakhstan) Tobol)
4	DF	UKR	Oleksandr Volovyk (from (Ukraine) Shakhtar Donetsk)
6	DF	BRA	Juninho (from (Brazil) Coimbra)
7	MF	KAZ	Bauyrzhan Baitana (from (Kazakhstan) Taraz)
10	MF	BRA	Vitor Júnior (from (Saudi Arabia) Al-Qadisiyah)
11	FW	BRA	Cassiano (loan from (Brazil) Internacional)
12	DF	KAZ	Damir Dautov (from (Kazakhstan) Irtysh Pavlodar)
14	DF	KAZ	Berik Aitbayev (from (Kazakhstan) Atyrau)
19	MF	ARG	Chaco Torres (from (Argentina) Chacarita Juniors)
20	MF	KAZ	Ardak Saulet (from (Kazakhstan) Astana)
30	DF	SEN	Papa Gueye (from (Russia) Rostov)
32	GK	KAZ	Samat Otarbayev (from (Kazakhstan) Ordabasy, previously on loan)
39	FW	BRA	Yuri Mamute (loan from (Brazil) Grêmio)
55	GK	KAZ	Andrei Sidelnikov (from (Kazakhstan) Kairat)
66	MF	KAZ	Rakhimzhan Rozybakiev (from (Kazakhstan) Akzhayik)
73	FW	UKR	Oleksandr Yermachenko (from (Georgia (country)) Zugdidi)
87	FW	BLR	Ihar Zyankovich
88	MF	KAZ	Anton Shurigin (from (Kazakhstan) Akzhayik)

Out: Note: Flags indicate national team as defined under FIFA eligibility rules; some limited exceptions apply. Players may hold more than one non-FIFA nationality.

No.	Pos.	Nation	Player
1	GK	KAZ	Tamabay Mұhambet
2	DF	RUS	Marat Sitdikov (to (Russia) Neftekhimik Nizhnekamsk)
3	DF	CIV	Kouassi Kouadja
6	MF	KAZ	Viktor Kryukov
7	FW	KAZ	Abat Aimbetov
8	FW	KAZ	Aleksey Shchotkin (loan return to (Kazakhstan) Astana)
10	MF	KAZ	Didar Zhalmukan
11	MF	UZB	Bobir Davlatov (loan return to (Russia) Rubin Kazan)
14	DF	RUS	Sandro Tsveiba (to (Russia) Krylia Sovetov)
17	DF	KAZ	Nurbol Zhumashev
21	DF	KAZ	Yegor Azovskiy
33	MF	SRB	Vuk Mitošević (to (Serbia) Javor Ivanjica)
35	GK	KAZ	Stanislav Pavlov (to (Kazakhstan) Tobol)
69	MF	RUS	Nikita Bocharov (to (Kazakhstan) Ordabasy)
72	FW	SRB	Nemanja Nikolić (to (Serbia) Spartak Subotica)
80	DF	RUS	Yegor Sorokin (loan return to (Russia) Rubin Kazan)

=== Akzhayik ===
In: Note: Flags indicate national team as defined under FIFA eligibility rules; some limited exceptions apply. Players may hold more than one non-FIFA nationality.

No.	Pos.	Nation	Player
6	MF	MNE	Jovan Nikolić (from (Montenegro) Sutjeska Nikšić)
9	FW	KAZ	Samit Chulagov (from (Kazakhstan) Bayterek)
10	MF	COL	Jhoan Arenas (from (Venezuela) Zamora)
12	MF	KAZ	Konstantin Zarechny (from (Kazakhstan) Altai Semey)
15	DF	KAZ	Dmitri Schmidt (from (Kazakhstan) Altai Semey)
19	MF	KAZ	Azat Ersalimov (from (Kazakhstan) Altai Semey)
25	FW	NGA	Izu Azuka
27	DF	KAZ	Andrey Shabaev (from (Kazakhstan) Zhetysu)
33	GK	KAZ	Vyacheslav Kotlyar (from (Kazakhstan) Altai Semey)
—	GK	KAZ	Alexander Udalov
—	MF	KAZ	Georgi Makayev (from (Kazakhstan) Kyzylzhar)
—	MF	KAZ	Mirada Zharylgasov
—	FW	KAZ	Yuriy Pertsukh (from (Kazakhstan) Kyzylzhar)

Out: Note: Flags indicate national team as defined under FIFA eligibility rules; some limited exceptions apply. Players may hold more than one non-FIFA nationality.

No.	Pos.	Nation	Player
1	GK	KAZ	Nurbolat Kalmenov
6	DF	BIH	Saša Kolunija (to (India) DSK Shivajians)
8	FW	KAZ	Aleksey Maltsev
11	MF	KAZ	Rakhimzhan Rozybakiev (to (Kazakhstan) Aktobe)
12	FW	SRB	Miroslav Lečić (to (Serbia) Jagodina)
15	MF	KAZ	Yevgeniy Levin (loan return to (Kazakhstan) Tobol)
17	MF	KAZ	Sergey Shevtsov
18	MF	KAZ	Ruslan Khairov
22	MF	KAZ	Nikolay Zabrodin
23	DF	KAZ	Zakhar Korobov
24	FW	KAZ	Kuanysh Begalin (loan return to (Kazakhstan) Irtysh Pavlodar)
28	FW	KAZ	Sergey Gridin
32	GK	SRB	Srđan Ostojić (to (Serbia) Zemun)
44	MF	KAZ	Marat Shakhmetov (to (Kazakhstan) Shakhter Karagandy)
77	DF	KAZ	Eldar Abdrakhmanov
83	DF	SRB	Danilo Nikolić (to (Serbia) OFK Beograd)
87	GK	KAZ	Roman Bagautdinov
88	MF	KAZ	Anton Shurygin

=== Astana ===
In: Note: Flags indicate national team as defined under FIFA eligibility rules; some limited exceptions apply. Players may hold more than one non-FIFA nationality.

No.	Pos.	Nation	Player
8	MF	BIH	Srđan Grahovac (loan from (Austria) Rapid Wien)
10	FW	ALB	Azdren Llullaku (from (Romania) Gaz Metan Mediaș)
18	MF	BLR	Ivan Mayewski (from (Russia) Anzhi Makhachkala)
44	DF	RUS	Yevgeny Postnikov (loan return from (Latvia) Ventspils)
45	FW	KAZ	Roman Murtazayev (from (Kazakhstan) Irtysh Pavlodar)
73	MF	KAZ	Didar Zhalmukan (from (Kazakhstan) Aktobe)

Out: Note: Flags indicate national team as defined under FIFA eligibility rules; some limited exceptions apply. Players may hold more than one non-FIFA nationality.

No.	Pos.	Nation	Player
8	MF	KAZ	Askhat Tagybergen (to (Kazakhstan) Tobol)
9	MF	MKD	Agim Ibraimi
10	FW	SRB	Đorđe Despotović (loan to (Kazakhstan) Tobol)
11	FW	KAZ	Aleksey Shchotkin (loan to (Kazakhstan) Tobol, previously on loan to (Kazakhstan) Aktobe)
13	MF	KAZ	Azat Nurgaliev (loan return to (Kazakhstan) Ordabasy)
17	FW	KAZ	Tanat Nusserbayev (to (Kazakhstan) Ordabasy)
21	DF	KAZ	Berik Shaikhov (loan to (Kazakhstan) Okzhetpes, previously on loan to (Kazakhstan) Zhetysu)
22	DF	KAZ	Konstantin Engel (to (Germany) VfL Osnabrück)
25	DF	KAZ	Serhiy Malyi (loan to (Kazakhstan) Tobol)
28	DF	KAZ	Birzhan Kulbekov
40	GK	KAZ	Mikhail Golubnichy (to (Kazakhstan) Okzhetpes)
47	GK	KAZ	Abylaikhan Duysen
85	GK	KAZ	Vladimir Loginovsky (to (Kazakhstan) Taraz, previously on loan to (Kazakhstan) Tobol)
88	MF	COL	Roger Cañas (loan to (Cyprus) APOEL)

=== Atyrau ===
In: Note: Flags indicate national team as defined under FIFA eligibility rules; some limited exceptions apply. Players may hold more than one non-FIFA nationality.

No.	Pos.	Nation	Player
3	DF	GEO	Ucha Lobjanidze (from (Georgia (country)) Dinamo Tbilisi)
5	DF	KAZ	Vukašin Tomić (from (Serbia) Jagodina)
7	MF	KAZ	Alisher Suley (from (Kazakhstan) Taraz)
8	MF	UZB	Shavkat Salomov (from (Uzbekistan) Buxoro)
9	FW	GEO	Vladimir Dvalishvili (from (Georgia (country)) Dinamo Tbilisi)
10	MF	KAZ	Marat Khairullin
13	MF	KAZ	Aibar Nurybekov (from (Kazakhstan) Shakhter Karagandy)
14	DF	KAZ	Kuanish Kalmuratov (from (Kazakhstan) Kaisar)
17	MF	KAZ	Almas Armenia (from (Kazakhstan) Caspiy)
19	MF	SRB	Jovan Đokić (from (Serbia) Javor Ivanjica)
20	GK	KAZ	Andrey Pasechenko (from (Kazakhstan) Zhetysu)
23	DF	KAZ	Miras Tuliyev (from (Kazakhstan) Okzhetpes)
26	GK	KAZ	Nurbolat Kalmenov (from (Kazakhstan) Zhetysu)
27	MF	KAZ	Bekzhan Onzhan
28	DF	KAZ	Zakhar Korobov (from (Kazakhstan) Akzhayik)
49	MF	KAZ	Dauren Kayralliev (from (Kazakhstan) Caspiy)
55	FW	CRO	Ivan Rodić (from (Ukraine) Metalist Kharkiv)
66	MF	KAZ	Anton Chichulin
77	DF	KAZ	Eldar Abdrakhmanov (from (Kazakhstan) Akzhayik)
81	MF	KAZ	Vitali Li (from (Kazakhstan) Kairat)
85	DF	KAZ	Zhaksylyk Halel (from (Kazakhstan) Altai Semey)

Out: Note: Flags indicate national team as defined under FIFA eligibility rules; some limited exceptions apply. Players may hold more than one non-FIFA nationality.

No.	Pos.	Nation	Player
5	DF	KAZ	Aleksei Muldarov (to (Kazakhstan) Kaisar)
7	MF	CMR	Guy Essame
8	DF	KAZ	Valentin Chureyev (to (Kazakhstan) Kaisar)
9	MF	UKR	Volodymyr Arzhanov (to (Kazakhstan) Kaisar)
10	MF	KAZ	Pavel Shabalin (to (Kazakhstan) Irtysh Pavlodar)
11	MF	UKR	Vyacheslav Sharpar (to (Ukraine) Vorskla Poltava)
13	FW	BLR	Alyaksandr Makas (to (Belarus) Torpedo-BelAZ Zhodino)
17	MF	KAZ	Ulan Konysbayev
19	MF	KAZ	Valeri Korobkin (to (Kazakhstan) Kaisar)
21	DF	MKD	Aleksandar Damčevski (to (Hungary) Mezőkövesd-Zsóry)
26	FW	POL	Przemysław Trytko (to (Poland) Arka Gdynia)
28	DF	KAZ	Vladislav Kuzmin
29	DF	KAZ	Berik Aitbayev (to (Kazakhstan) Aktobe)
30	MF	ROU	Alexandru Curtean
33	DF	CMR	Abdel Lamanje (to (Kazakhstan) Kaisar)
35	GK	KAZ	Ramil Nurmukhametov (to (Kazakhstan) Ordabasy)
77	FW	KAZ	Kasymkhan Nakpayev
96	FW	KAZ	Maxim Fedin (to (Kazakhstan) Okzhetpes)

=== Irtysh ===
In: Note: Flags indicate national team as defined under FIFA eligibility rules; some limited exceptions apply. Players may hold more than one non-FIFA nationality.

No.	Pos.	Nation	Player
2	DF	KAZ	Ilya Vorotnikov (from (Kazakhstan) Taraz)
3	DF	KAZ	Vladislav Chernyshov
4	DF	KAZ	Aleksandr Kislitsyn (from (Kazakhstan) Okzhetpes)
7	MF	KAZ	Aslan Darabayev (from (Kazakhstan) Kairat)
8	MF	BRA	Rodrigo António (from (Israel) Bnei Sakhnin)
9	FW	KAZ	Nurbol Zhumaskaliyev (from (Kazakhstan) Altai Semey)
10	FW	CMR	Serge Bando N'Ganbe (from (Kazakhstan) Okzhetpes)
11	FW	CIV	Béko Fofana (loan from (Serbia) Čukarički)
17	MF	KAZ	Ilia Kalinin (from (Kazakhstan) Zhetysu)
19	FW	CIV	Franck Dja Djédjé (from (Qatar) Al-Shahania)
21	GK	KAZ	Nikita Kalmykov (from (Kazakhstan) Kyzylzhar)
30	DF	SRB	Stefan Živković (from (Montenegro) Zeta)
34	DF	UKR	Yevhen Tkachuk (from (Ukraine) Zorya Luhansk)
37	MF	KAZ	Pavel Shabalin (from (Kazakhstan) Atyrau)
50	DF	GEO	Lasha Dvali (loan from (Poland) Śląsk Wrocław)

Out: Note: Flags indicate national team as defined under FIFA eligibility rules; some limited exceptions apply. Players may hold more than one non-FIFA nationality.

No.	Pos.	Nation	Player
2	DF	KAZ	Yeldos Akhmetov (to (Kazakhstan) Kairat)
4	DF	LTU	Georgas Freidgeimas (loan return to (Lithuania) Žalgiris Vilnius)
8	DF	KAZ	Damir Dautov (from (Kazakhstan) Aktobe)
9	FW	SEN	Baye Djiby Fall (to (United States) Cincinnati)
10	FW	CHI	Ignacio Herrera (to (Azerbaijan) Neftchi Baku)
11	MF	GEO	Shota Grigalashvili (to (Uzbekistan) Olmaliq)
13	MF	KAZ	Alibek Ayaganov (to (Kazakhstan) Okzhetpes)
15	DF	BIH	Semir Kerla (to (Bosnia and Herzegovina) Željezničar Sarajevo)
16	MF	CZE	Tomáš Jirsák (to (Czech Republic) Hradec Králové)
17	MF	KAZ	Vitali Li (loan return to (Kazakhstan) Kairat)
19	DF	KAZ	Grigori Sartakov (to (Kazakhstan) Tobol)
20	GK	KAZ	Anton Tsirin (to (Kazakhstan) Kaisar)
45	FW	KAZ	Roman Murtazayev (to (Kazakhstan) Astana)
77	MF	KAZ	Vladimir Vomenko

=== Kairat ===
In: Note: Flags indicate national team as defined under FIFA eligibility rules; some limited exceptions apply. Players may hold more than one non-FIFA nationality.

No.	Pos.	Nation	Player
4	DF	KAZ	Yeldos Akhmetov (from (Kazakhstan) Irtysh Pavlodar)
20	MF	CRO	Ivo Iličević (from (Russia) Anzhi Makhachkala)
21	FW	NOR	Chuma Anene (from (Russia) Amkar Perm)
23	MF	KAZ	Georgy Zhukov (from (Russia) Ural Yekaterinburg)
25	MF	HUN	Ákos Elek (from (Hungary) Diósgyőr)
27	GK	KAZ	Stas Pokatilov (from (Russia) Rostov, previously on loan)
—	FW	RUS	Samat Sarsenov (from (Russia) Orenburg)

Out: Note: Flags indicate national team as defined under FIFA eligibility rules; some limited exceptions apply. Players may hold more than one non-FIFA nationality.

No.	Pos.	Nation	Player
4	DF	BRA	Bruno Soares (to (Norway) Haugesund)
16	GK	KAZ	Andrei Sidelnikov (to (Kazakhstan) Aktobe)
17	MF	KAZ	Aslan Darabayev (to (Kazakhstan) Irtysh Pavlodar)
18	MF	KAZ	Vitali Li (to (Kazakhstan) Atyrau, previously on loan to (Kazakhstan) Irtysh Pavlodar)
20	FW	CMR	Léandre Tawamba (to (Serbia) Partizan Belgrade)
21	DF	KAZ	Nurlan Dairov
24	FW	KAZ	Rifat Nurmugamet
25	GK	KAZ	Vladimir Groshev
26	DF	KAZ	Dilshat Musayev
30	MF	CHI	Gerson Acevedo
44	MF	UKR	Anatoliy Tymoshchuk (Retired)

=== Kaisar ===
In: Note: Flags indicate national team as defined under FIFA eligibility rules; some limited exceptions apply. Players may hold more than one non-FIFA nationality.

No.	Pos.	Nation	Player
1	GK	KAZ	Anton Tsirin (from (Kazakhstan) Irtysh Pavlodar)
7	MF	KAZ	Maksat Baizhanov (from (Kazakhstan) Shakhter Karagandy)
9	MF	UKR	Volodymyr Arzhanov (from (Kazakhstan) Atyrau)
13	DF	KAZ	Ilyas Amirseitov (from (Kazakhstan) Zhetysu)
16	GK	KAZ	Aleksandr Grigorenko (from (Kazakhstan) Taraz)
17	MF	KAZ	Zhambyl Kukeyev
19	MF	MTQ	Mathias Coureur (from (Bulgaria) Lokomotiv GO)
23	MF	KAZ	Valeri Korobkin (from (Kazakhstan) Atyrau)
25	MF	SLE	John Kamara (from (Latvia) Riga)
27	DF	KAZ	Dmitri Yevstigneyev (from (Kazakhstan) Taraz)
31	DF	KAZ	Aleksei Muldarov (from (Kazakhstan) Atyrau)
33	DF	CMR	Abdel Lamanje (from (Kazakhstan) Atyrau)
39	MF	BDI	Saidi Ntibazonkiza
77	DF	KAZ	Yevgeni Goryachi (from (Kazakhstan) Shakhter Karagandy)
88	DF	KAZ	Valentin Chureyev (from (Kazakhstan) Atyrau)
99	FW	MNE	Stefan Nikolić (from (Serbia) Radnik Surdulica)
—	MF	NED	Gregory Nelson

Out: Note: Flags indicate national team as defined under FIFA eligibility rules; some limited exceptions apply. Players may hold more than one non-FIFA nationality.

No.	Pos.	Nation	Player
3	DF	KAZ	Anton Moltusinov (to (Kazakhstan) Taraz)
19	MF	KAZ	Vladimir Vyatkin
90	MF	SVN	Matic Maruško (to (Slovenia) Mura 05)
—	MF	NED	Gregory Nelson (to (Bahrain) Al-Muharraq)

=== Okzhetpes ===
In: Note: Flags indicate national team as defined under FIFA eligibility rules; some limited exceptions apply. Players may hold more than one non-FIFA nationality.

No.	Pos.	Nation	Player
3	DF	KAZ	Nurlan Dairov (from (Kazakhstan) Kairat)
6	DF	KAZ	Sergey Keyler (from (Kazakhstan) Kaisar)
7	MF	KAZ	Yerkebulan Nurgaliyev (from (Kazakhstan) Altai Semey)
10	FW	RUS	Aleksandr Kozlov (from (Russia) Fakel Voronezh)
17	MF	KAZ	Oleg Nedashkovsky
18	MF	KAZ	Daniel Choi (from (Kazakhstan) Tobol)
19	MF	KAZ	Demiyat Slambekov (from (Kazakhstan) Bayterek)
20	DF	KAZ	Berik Shaikhov (loan from (Kazakhstan) Astana)
21	MF	SVN	Lucas Horvat (from (Slovenia) Domžale)
22	MF	KAZ	Alibek Ayaganov (from (Kazakhstan) Irtysh Pavlodar)
23	MF	KAZ	Timur Dosmagambetov (from (Kazakhstan) Tobol)
25	DF	KAZ	Aleksandr Marochkin (from (Kazakhstan) Kaisar)
33	FW	BUL	Tsvetan Genkov (from (Bulgaria) Lokomotiv GO)
40	GK	KAZ	Mikhail Golubnichy (from (Kazakhstan) Astana)
89	MF	UKR	Serhiy Politylo (from (Ukraine) Dnipro Dnipropetrovsk)
96	FW	KAZ	Maxim Fedin (from (Kazakhstan) Atyrau)

Out: Note: Flags indicate national team as defined under FIFA eligibility rules; some limited exceptions apply. Players may hold more than one non-FIFA nationality.

No.	Pos.	Nation	Player
5	MF	KAZ	Anatoli Bogdanov
6	DF	KAZ	Ilnur Mangutkin (to (Kazakhstan) Shakhter Karagandy)
7	FW	KAZ	Sanat Zhumahanov (to (Kazakhstan) Ordabasy)
17	FW	KAZ	Zhasulan Moldakaraev (to (Kazakhstan) Tobol)
18	MF	SRB	Risto Ristović (to (Serbia) Zemun)
21	MF	KAZ	Zhakyp Kozhamberdi (to (Kazakhstan) Taraz)
23	DF	KAZ	Miras Tuliyev
24	GK	KAZ	Dzhurakhon Babakhanov (to (Kazakhstan) Taraz)
32	FW	CHI	Nicolás Canales (to (Chile) Deportes Temuco)
36	DF	KAZ	Oleg Lebedev
53	DF	KAZ	Viktor Zyabko
77	DF	UKR	Oleksandr Chyzhov (to (Ukraine) Vorskla Poltava)
88	FW	CMR	Serge Bando N'Ganbe (to (Kazakhstan) Irtysh Pavlodar)

=== Ordabasy ===
In: Note: Flags indicate national team as defined under FIFA eligibility rules; some limited exceptions apply. Players may hold more than one non-FIFA nationality.

No.	Pos.	Nation	Player
5	DF	SRB	Zoran Rendulić (from (Serbia) Red Star Belgrade)
7	FW	KAZ	Tanat Nusserbayev (from (Kazakhstan) Astana)
11	MF	UKR	Kyrylo Kovalchuk (from (Russia) Tom Tomsk)
13	MF	KAZ	Azat Nurgaliev (loan return from (Kazakhstan) Astana)
14	DF	ARG	Pablo Fontanello (from (Russia) Ural)
18	FW	BUL	Preslav Yordanov (from (Bulgaria) CSKA Sofia)
25	GK	KAZ	Ramil Nurmukhametov (from (Kazakhstan) Atyrau)
27	FW	KAZ	Alibek Buleshev (from (Kazakhstan) Okzhetpes)
30	MF	KAZ	Sanat Zhumahanov (from (Kazakhstan) Okzhetpes)
69	MF	RUS	Nikita Bocharov (from (Kazakhstan) Aktobe)

Out: Note: Flags indicate national team as defined under FIFA eligibility rules; some limited exceptions apply. Players may hold more than one non-FIFA nationality.

No.	Pos.	Nation	Player
6	MF	NGA	Dominic Chatto (to (Sweden) Falkenberg)
9	FW	MNE	Filip Kasalica (to (Serbia) Napredak Kruševac)
11	FW	KAZ	Dauren Kaykibasov
15	DF	SRB	Branislav Trajković
—	GK	KAZ	Samat Otarbayev (to (Kazakhstan) Aktobe, previously on loan)

=== Shakhter Karagandy ===
In: Note: Flags indicate national team as defined under FIFA eligibility rules; some limited exceptions apply. Players may hold more than one non-FIFA nationality.

No.	Pos.	Nation	Player
6	DF	KAZ	Ilnur Mangutkin (from (Kazakhstan) Okzhetpes)
7	DF	CIV	Didier Kadio (from (India) Kerala Blasters)
10	FW	KAZ	Daurenbek Tazhimbetov (from (Kazakhstan) Taraz)
13	DF	ENG	Korede Aiyegbusi (from (Sweden) Eskilstuna)
21	MF	KAZ	Rinat Khairullin
22	MF	KAZ	Marat Shakhmetov (from (Kazakhstan) Akzhayik)
24	MF	SRB	Milan Stojanović (from (Serbia) Metalac)
32	MF	KAZ	Maxim Kazanin
77	MF	KAZ	Aidos Oral
88	MF	SRB	Marko Stanojević (from (Serbia) Rad)
99	FW	BEL	Alessio Allegria (from (Belgium) RFC Seraing)

Out: Note: Flags indicate national team as defined under FIFA eligibility rules; some limited exceptions apply. Players may hold more than one non-FIFA nationality.

No.	Pos.	Nation	Player
5	DF	ARM	Robert Arzumanyan (loan return to (Russia) Amkar Perm)
7	MF	NED	Desley Ubbink (to (Slovakia) Trenčín)
11	MF	KAZ	Maksat Baizhanov (to (Kazakhstan) Kaisar)
14	FW	KAZ	Andrei Finonchenko (Retired)
15	DF	KAZ	Gregory Dubkov
16	FW	KAZ	Sergey Vetrov
17	MF	KAZ	Aibar Nurybekov
24	FW	MKD	Marko Simonovski
77	DF	KAZ	Yevgeni Goryachi (to (Kazakhstan) Kaisar)
89	FW	SVK	Filip Serečin (to (Slovakia) Zemplín Michalovce)

=== Taraz ===
In: Note: Flags indicate national team as defined under FIFA eligibility rules; some limited exceptions apply. Players may hold more than one non-FIFA nationality.

No.	Pos.	Nation	Player
1	GK	KAZ	Vladimir Loginovsky (from (Kazakhstan) Astana)
3	DF	KAZ	Anton Moltusinov (from (Kazakhstan) Kaisar)
4	DF	KAZ	Bekzat Shadmanov
5	DF	KAZ	Adlet Kenesbek
8	MF	GUI	Mohammed Diarra (from (Kazakhstan) Altai Semey)
9	MF	KAZ	Zhakyp Kozhamberdi (from (Kazakhstan) Okzhetpes)
10	MF	KAZ	Gabriel Kahn
11	MF	KAZ	Baktiyar Zaynutdinov
14	FW	KAZ	Timur Baizhanov (from (Kazakhstan) Kyzylzhar)
17	DF	KAZ	Nurtas Kurgulin (from (Kazakhstan) Tobol)
18	MF	KAZ	Maksim Azovskiy (from (Kazakhstan) Zhetysu)
21	FW	HAI	Jean-Eudes Maurice (from (Vietnam) Sài Gòn)
23	FW	RUS	Ruslan Mukhametshin (from (Russia) Arsenal Tula)
24	GK	KAZ	Dzhurakhon Babakhanov (from (Kazakhstan) Okzhetpes)
25	MF	RUS	Yevgeni Shipitsin (from (Russia) Sochi)
26	MF	KAZ	Sanjar Nurlybaev
28	FW	UKR	Maksym Feshchuk (from (Moldova) Dacia Chișinău)
32	MF	RUS	Andrei Gorbanets (from (Russia) Arsenal Tula)
35	GK	KAZ	Bobyr Zaynutdinov (from (Kazakhstan) Lashyn)
77	GK	KAZ	Arslan Satubaldin (from (Kazakhstan) Altai Semey)
—	DF	MNE	Nemanja Mijušković (from (North Macedonia) Vardar)

Out: Note: Flags indicate national team as defined under FIFA eligibility rules; some limited exceptions apply. Players may hold more than one non-FIFA nationality.

No.	Pos.	Nation	Player
1	GK	KAZ	Aleksandr Grigorenko (to (Kazakhstan) Kaisar)
2	DF	KAZ	Daniyar Bayaliev
4	DF	KAZ	Ilya Vorotnikov (to (Kazakhstan) Irtysh Pavlodar)
6	MF	KAZ	Marat Shakhmetov
7	MF	KAZ	Alisher Suley (to (Kazakhstan) Atyrau)
8	MF	KAZ	Vitali Yevstigneyev
10	MF	KAZ	Bauyrzhan Baitana (to (Kazakhstan) Aktobe)
12	FW	ROU	Ioan Mera (to (Romania) Politehnica Timișoara)
13	FW	SEN	Malick Mané (to (China) Nei Mongol Zhongyou)
17	MF	KAZ	Oleg Nedashkovsky
19	DF	KAZ	Dmitri Yevstigneyev (to (Kazakhstan) Kaisar)
21	MF	KAZ	Bakhytzhan Rymtaev
25	MF	UKR	Taras Danilyuk
44	MF	KAZ	Adilet Abdenabi
50	DF	RUS	Anton Grigoryev (to (Russia) Volgar Astrakhan)
67	MF	UKR	Andriy Yakovlyev
71	FW	KAZ	Daurenbek Tazhimbetov (to (Kazakhstan) Shakhter Karagandy)
75	FW	UKR	Oleksandr Pyshchur (to (Uzbekistan) Shurtan Guzar)
99	DF	KAZ	Aleksandr Kirov

=== Tobol ===
In: Note: Flags indicate national team as defined under FIFA eligibility rules; some limited exceptions apply. Players may hold more than one non-FIFA nationality.

No.	Pos.	Nation	Player
6	MF	KAZ	Samat Zharynbektov (from (Kazakhstan) Ekibastuz)
12	GK	UKR	Dmytro Nepohodov (from (Ukraine) Vorskla Poltava)
16	FW	KAZ	Toktar Zhangylyshbay (from (Kazakhstan) Zhetysu)
17	FW	KAZ	Zhasulan Moldakaraev (from (Kazakhstan) Altai Semey)
19	DF	KAZ	Grigori Sartakov (from (Kazakhstan) Irtysh Pavlodar)
20	MF	KAZ	Yevgeniy Levin (loan return from (Kazakhstan) Akzhayik)
25	DF	KAZ	Serhiy Malyi (loan from (Kazakhstan) Astana)
32	FW	SRB	Đorđe Despotović (loan from (Kazakhstan) Astana)
35	GK	KAZ	Stanislav Pavlov (from (Kazakhstan) Aktobe)
88	MF	KAZ	Askhat Tagybergen (from (Kazakhstan) Astana)
99	FW	KAZ	Aleksey Shchotkin (loan from (Kazakhstan) Astana)

Out: Note: Flags indicate national team as defined under FIFA eligibility rules; some limited exceptions apply. Players may hold more than one non-FIFA nationality.

No.	Pos.	Nation	Player
1	GK	KAZ	Vladimir Loginovsky (loan return to (Kazakhstan) Astana)
2	DF	KAZ	Rafkat Aslan (to (Kazakhstan) Aktobe)
6	MF	KAZ	Daniel Choi (to (Kazakhstan) Okzhetpes)
7	MF	KAZ	Timur Dosmagambetov (to (Kazakhstan) Okzhetpes)
9	FW	KAZ	Nurbol Zhumaskaliyev (to (Kazakhstan) Altai Semey)
10	FW	RUS	Shamil Asildarov (to (Russia) Anzhi Makhachkala)
19	MF	KAZ	Nurtas Kurgulin (to (Kazakhstan) Taraz)
22	MF	ROU	Ciprian Deac (to (Romania) CFR Cluj)
23	DF	UKR	Serhiy Yavorskyi (to (Ukraine) Illichivets Mariupol)
28	DF	KAZ	Anuar Agaysin
35	GK	KAZ	Aleksandr Petukhov
91	FW	KAZ	Sergei Khizhnichenko (to (Belarus) Shakhtyor Soligorsk)
