= 2016 FC Aktobe season =

FC Aktobe
2016 season
- Chairman: Sagat Yensegenuly
- Manager: Yuri Utkulbayev
- Stadium: Central Stadium
- Kazakhstan Premier League: 6th
- Kazakhstan Cup: Last 16 vs Zhetysu
- Europa League: First qualifying round vs MTK Budapest
- Top goalscorer: League: Nikita Bocharov (7); All: Two Players (7)
Home colours	Away colours

The 2016 FC Aktobe season is the 16th successive season that the club will play in the Kazakhstan Premier League, the highest tier of association football in Kazakhstan. Aktobe will also play in the Kazakhstan Cup and the Europa League.

Prior to the season starting, Aktobe appointed Yuri Utkulbayev as their new manager following the end of Ioan Andone's contract.

== Squad ==
As of 7 September 2016

Note: Flags indicate national team as defined under FIFA eligibility rules; some limited exceptions apply. Players may hold more than one non-FIFA nationality.

No.	Pos.	Nation	Player
1	GK	KAZ	Tamabay Mұhambet
2	DF	RUS	Marat Sitdikov
3	DF	CIV	Kouassi Kouadja
5	DF	KAZ	Bagdat Kairov
6	MF	KAZ	Viktor Kryukov
7	FW	KAZ	Abat Aimbetov
10	MF	KAZ	Didar Zhalmukan
11	MF	UZB	Bobir Davlatov (loan from Rubin Kazan)
14	DF	RUS	Sandro Tsveiba
17	DF	KAZ	Nurbol Zhumashev
21	DF	KAZ	Yegor Azovskiy

No.	Pos.	Nation	Player
22	MF	KAZ	Kirill Shestakov
25	DF	KAZ	Sayat Zhumagali
32	GK	KAZ	Samat Otarbayev
33	MF	SRB	Vuk Mitošević
35	GK	KAZ	Stanislav Pavlov
37	MF	KAZ	Abilkhan Abdukarimov
47	MF	KAZ	Aslanbek Kakimov
69	MF	RUS	Nikita Bocharov
72	FW	SRB	Nemanja Nikolić
80	DF	RUS	Yegor Sorokin (loan from Rubin Kazan)
88	FW	KAZ	Aleksey Shchotkin (loan from Astana)

== Transfers ==
=== Winter ===
In: Note: Flags indicate national team as defined under FIFA eligibility rules; some limited exceptions apply. Players may hold more than one non-FIFA nationality.

No.	Pos.	Nation	Player
2	MF	RUS	Marat Sitdikov (from (Russia) Dnepr Smolensk)
3	DF	CIV	Kouassi Kouadja (from (Belarus) Slutsk)
5	DF	KAZ	Bagdat Kairov
6	MF	KAZ	Viktor Kryukov (from (Kazakhstan) Okzhetpes)
8	DF	KAZ	Samat Smakov (from (Kazakhstan) Irtysh Pavlodar)
9	MF	KAZ	Abylaykhan Totay (from (Kazakhstan) Irtysh Pavlodar)
11	MF	UZB	Bobir Davlatov (loan from (Russia) Rubin Kazan)
14	DF	RUS	Sandro Tsveiba (from (Croatia) Osijek)
17	MF	KAZ	Nurbol Zhumashev
19	FW	KAZ	Sergey Lisenkov
21	DF	KAZ	Yegor Azovskiy (from (Kazakhstan) Okzhetpes)
22	MF	KAZ	Kirill Shestakov (from (Kazakhstan) Kaisar)
23	FW	UKR	Ilya Mikhalyov (from (Ukraine) Karpaty Lviv)
24	FW	RUS	Mikhail Petrolay (loan from (Russia) Rubin Kazan)
29	FW	KAZ	Toktar Zhangylyshbay (from (Kazakhstan) Astana)
32	GK	KAZ	Samat Otarbayev (from (Kazakhstan) Ordabasy)
37	MF	KAZ	Islambek Kulekenov (from (Kazakhstan) Astana)
39	FW	KAZ	Murat Tleshev (from (Kazakhstan) Atyrau)
47	MF	KAZ	Aslanbek Kakimov
69	MF	RUS	Nikita Bocharov (from (Russia) Tom-2 Tomsk)
80	DF	RUS	Yegor Sorokin (loan from (Russia) Rubin Kazan)

Out: Note: Flags indicate national team as defined under FIFA eligibility rules; some limited exceptions apply. Players may hold more than one non-FIFA nationality.

No.	Pos.	Nation	Player
1	GK	KAZ	Stas Pokatilov (to (Russia) Rostov)
2	DF	NGR	Dele Adeleye
3	DF	KAZ	Valeri Korobkin (to (Kazakhstan) Atyrau)
5	MF	LTU	Artūras Žulpa (to (Kazakhstan) Tobol)
7	DF	KAZ	Dmitri Miroshnichenko (to (Kazakhstan) Tobol)
8	DF	KAZ	Viktor Dmitrenko (to (Kazakhstan) Tobol)
10	MF	KAZ	Marat Khayrullin (to (Kazakhstan) Okzhetpes)
11	FW	BRA	Danilo Neco
12	DF	TTO	Robert Primus (to (Trinidad and Tobago) Morvant Caledonia United)
16	GK	KAZ	Almat Bekbaev (to (Kazakhstan) Ordabasy)
17	MF	KAZ	Askhat Tagybergen (to (Kazakhstan) Astana)
20	MF	ROU	Ciprian Deac (to (Kazakhstan) Tobol)
23	DF	KAZ	Yuriy Logvinenko (to (Kazakhstan) Astana)
34	MF	ARM	Marcos Pizzelli (to (Saudi Arabia) Al-Raed)
55	DF	BRA	Anderson Santana
91	FW	KAZ	Sergey Khizhnichenko (to (Kazakhstan) Tobol)
99	FW	BRA	Danilo (to (Thailand) Buriram United)

Trialists: Note: Flags indicate national team as defined under FIFA eligibility rules; some limited exceptions apply. Players may hold more than one non-FIFA nationality.

No.	Pos.	Nation	Player
—	MF	CIV	Abdul Razak
—	FW	SCO	Islam Feruz

=== Summer ===
In: Note: Flags indicate national team as defined under FIFA eligibility rules; some limited exceptions apply. Players may hold more than one non-FIFA nationality.

No.	Pos.	Nation	Player
11	MF	UZB	Bobir Davlatov (loan from (Russia) Rubin Kazan)
33	MF	SRB	Vuk Mitošević (from (Serbia) Jagodina)
72	FW	SRB	Nemanja Nikolić (from (Russia) Rostov)
77	FW	CIV	Lassina Dao (from (Moldova) Zaria Bălți)
85	FW	RUS	Dmitry Golubov (from (Russia) Dynamo Stavropol)
88	FW	KAZ	Aleksey Shchotkin (loan from (Kazakhstan) Astana)

Out: Note: Flags indicate national team as defined under FIFA eligibility rules; some limited exceptions apply. Players may hold more than one non-FIFA nationality.

No.	Pos.	Nation	Player
8	DF	KAZ	Samat Smakov (to (Kazakhstan) Ordabasy)
9	MF	KAZ	Abylaykhan Totay
18	FW	KAZ	Toktar Zhangylyshbay (to (Kazakhstan) Zhetysu)
19	FW	KAZ	Sergey Lisenkov
23	FW	UKR	Ilya Mikhalyov (to (Russia) Luch-Energiya Vladivostok)
24	FW	RUS	Mikhail Petrolay (loan return to (Russia) Rubin Kazan)
33	FW	KAZ	Rustam Sakhibov
39	FW	KAZ	Murat Tleshev
77	FW	CIV	Lassina Dao
85	FW	RUS	Dmitry Golubov

== Friendlies ==
8 February 2016	Aktobe (Kazakhstan)	0 – 4	(Serbia) Voždovac	Belek, Turkey
(UTC+6)		Summary	Goal

12 February 2016	Aktobe (Kazakhstan)	4 – 0	(Georgia (country)) Sioni	Belek, Turkey
00:30 (UTC+6)	D.Zhalmukan; Bocharov; I.Kulekenov	Summary

16 February 2016	Aktobe (Kazakhstan)	0 – 3	(Ukraine) Zorya Luhansk	Belek, Turkey
(UTC+6)		Summary	Kamenyuka 7' (pen.); 16'

== Competitions ==
=== Kazakhstan Premier League ===
==== Regular season ====
===== Results summary =====
Overall								Home						Away					
Pld	W	D	L	GF	GA	GD	Pts	W	D	L	GF	GA	GD	W	D	L	GF	GA	GD
22	7	7	8	23	32	−9	28	5	3	3	13	13	0	2	4	5	10	19	−9

Last updated: 26 July 2016.
Source: See Results

===== Results by round =====
Round	1	2	3	4	5	6	7	8	9	10	11	12	13	14	15	16	17	18	19	20	21	22
Ground	A	A	A	H	A	H	A	H	A	H	A	H	H	A	H	A	H	A	H	A	H	H
Result	L	D	L	W	W	D	L	W	D	W	W	D	L	D	L	L	L	L	W	D	W	D
Position	12	11	10	7	6	5	7	6	5	5	5	6	6	5	6	6	8	8	8	8	6	8

Source: See Results
A = Away; H = Home; W = Win; D = Draw; L = Loss

===== Results =====
13 March 2016 1	Ordabasy	3 – 1	Aktobe	Shymkent
15:00 (UTC+6)	Nurgaliev 34' (pen.), 53'; Junuzović 45+2' (yellow card) 46'; G.Suyumbaev (yellow card) 63'	Summary	Smakov (yellow card) 34'; Davlatov 68'	Stadium: Kazhymukan Munaitpasov Stadium; Attendance: 4,500; Referee: Artyom Kuchin

19 March 2016 2	Taraz	1 – 1	Aktobe	Taraz
16:00 (UTC+6)	Golić (yellow card) 23'; Mera (yellow card) 38'; Zyankovich 45'; O.Nedashkovsky (red card) 69'	Summary	Smakov 11' (pen.); B.Kairov (yellow card) 69'; Sorokin (yellow card) 74'; Azovskiy (yellow card) 77'; Kouadja (yellow card) 88'	Stadium: Central Stadium; Attendance: 6,500; Referee: Aleksandr Gauzer

4 April 2016 3	Astana	1 – 0	Aktobe	Astana
16:00 (UTC+6)	Shomko (yellow card) 59'; Twumasi 83'	Summary	Zhangylyshbay (yellow card) 27'; B.Kairov (yellow card) 44'	Stadium: Astana Arena; Attendance: 7,500; Referee: Askhat Abdanbayev

9 April 2016 4	Aktobe	3 – 2	Zhetysu	Astana
19:00 (UTC+6)	Smakov 15'; Bocharov 25'; A.Kakimov (yellow card) 51'; Shestakov (yellow card) 69'; Petrolay (yellow card) 85'; Zhangylyshbay 87' (yellow card) 87'; Kouadja (yellow card) 88'	Summary	Klein 52'; Savić 89'; Goa (yellow card) 90'	Stadium: Astana Arena; Attendance: 1,000; Referee: Bagdat Abdullaev

13 April 2016 5	Tobol	1 – 2	Aktobe	Kostanay
17:00 (UTC+6)	Dudchenko 6'; R.Rozybakiev (yellow card) 36'; Dmitrenko (yellow card) 58'	Summary	A.Kakimov 21'; Kouadja (yellow card) 42'; Bocharov 70'	Stadium: Central Stadium; Attendance: 3,000; Referee: Denis Izmailov

17 April 2016 6	Aktobe	1 – 1	Irtysh Pavlodar	Aktobe
17:00 (UTC+6)	Kouadja (yellow card) 21'; Tleshev (yellow card) 69'; Smakov 87' (pen.); Zhangylyshbay (yellow card) 89'	Summary	Gogua 22' (pen.) (yellow card) 37'; Aliev (yellow card) 65'	Stadium: Central Stadium; Attendance: 9,000; Referee: Marat Iskakov

23 April 2016 7	Kairat	3 – 0	Aktobe	Almaty
18:00 (UTC+6)	Marković 42'; Arshavin 44' (yellow card) 53'; Tymoshchuk 90+2'	Summary	B.Kairov (yellow card) 17' (yellow-red card) 90+4'	Stadium: Central Stadium; Attendance: 13,000; Referee: Igor Aleshin

1 May 2016 8	Aktobe	1 – 0	Okzhetpes	Aktobe
18:00 (UTC+6)	Sorokin (yellow card) 42'; V.Kryukov (yellow card) 44'; D.Zhalmukan (yellow card) 45'; Smakov 73' (pen.); A.Kakimov (yellow card) 89'	Summary	Yurin (yellow card) 4'; Kozhamberdi (yellow card) 45'; Ristović (yellow card) 72'; Chertov (yellow card) 73'; Volkov (yellow card) 90+3'	Stadium: Central Stadium; Attendance: 6,500; Referee: Viktor Antonov

5 May 2016 9	Akzhayik	0 – 0	Aktobe	Oral
18:00 (UTC+6)	Kolunija (yellow card) 50'; Govedarica (yellow card) 73'; S.Shevtsov (yellow card) 80'	Summary	Zhangylyshbay (yellow card) 85'; V.Kryukov (yellow card) 86'	Stadium: Petr Atoyan Stadium; Attendance: 3,000; Referee: Denis Izmailov

9 May 2015 10	Aktobe	1 – 0	Atyrau	Aktobe
15:00 (UTC+6)	D.Zhalmukan 74' (pen.); Mikhalyov (yellow card) 75'; A.Totay (yellow card) 90+1'	Summary	Korobkin (yellow card) 73'	Stadium: Central Stadium; Attendance: 5,500; Referee: Denis Tevyashov

14 May 2016 11	Shakhter Karagandy	0 – 2	Aktobe	Karaganda
17:00 (UTC+6)	A.Nurybekov (yellow card) 65' (yellow-red card) 71'; Y.Tarasov (yellow card) 88'	Summary	D.Zhalmukan 8'; Zhangylyshbay 38'	Stadium: Shakhter Stadium; Attendance: 2,500; Referee: Bolat Karlibayev

21 May 2016 12	Aktobe	2 – 2	Taraz	Aktobe
20:00 (UTC+6)	Smakov 44' (pen.); D.Zhalmukan 45+1'; Tsveiba (yellow card) 57'; Tleshev (yellow card) 90+4'	Summary	Mera (yellow card) 5'; Yevstigneyev (yellow card) 30' (goal) 38'; Grigorenko (yellow card) 42'; Mané 50'; B.Baitana (yellow card) 90+6'	Stadium: Central Stadium; Attendance: 5,000; Referee: Igor Chesnokov

29 May 2016 13	Aktobe	0 – 1	Astana	Aktobe
20:00 (UTC+6)	Bocharov (yellow card) 22'	Summary	Postnikov (yellow card) 38'; Maksimović 83'; Shchotkin (yellow card) 89'	Stadium: Central Stadium; Attendance: 8,000; Referee: Aleksandr Aliyev

2 June 2016 14	Zhetysu	1 – 1	Aktobe	Taldykorgan
17:30 (UTC+6)	Savić (yellow card) 8'; I.Amirseitov 73'	Summary	Tsveiba 70'; Sitdikov (yellow card) 74'; Sorokin (yellow card) 90+3'	Stadium: Zhetysu Stadium; Attendance: 1,000; Referee: Marat Iskakov

11 June 2016 15	Aktobe	0 – 1	Tobol	Aktobe
20:00 (UTC+6)	D.Zhalmukan (yellow card) 17'; V.Kryukov (yellow card) 75'	Summary	Yavorskyi (yellow card) 9' (goal) 68'; Žulpa (yellow card) 54'; Dosmagambetov (yellow card) 69'; Mukhutdinov (yellow card) 87'; Loginovsky (yellow card) 88'	Stadium: Central Stadium; Attendance: 4,000; Referee: Sergey Gorokhovodatskiy

15 June 2016 16	Irtysh Pavlodar	4 – 1	Aktobe	Pavlodar
19:00 (UTC+6)	Herrera 2'; R.Murtazayev 35' (pen.); Akhmetov 48'; Aliev (yellow card) 50'; Jallow 82'	Summary	Azovskiy (yellow card) 35'; D.Zhalmukan 55'; V.Kryukov (yellow card) 65'; Sitdikov (yellow card) 67'	Stadium: Central Stadium; Attendance: 4,500; Referee: Denis Tevyashov

19 June 2016 17	Aktobe	2 – 6	Kairat	Aktobe
20:00 (UTC+6)	Shestakov 43'; D.Zhalmukan 64' (pen.); Kouadja (yellow card) 85'	Summary	Tesák 4'; Islamkhan 17'; Gohou 25', 65'; Arshavin 38'; Isael 77'	Stadium: Central Stadium; Attendance: 6,000; Referee: Artyom Kuchin

24 June 2016 18	Okzhetpes	4 – 1	Aktobe	Kokshetau
19:00 (UTC+6)	Khairullin 20', 41'; Kislitsyn 35'; Buleshev 67'	Summary	Golubov 87'	Stadium: Okzhetpes Stadium; Attendance: 2,500; Referee: Aydin Rakhimbayev

3 July 2016 19	Aktobe	1 – 0	Akzhayik	Aktobe
20:00 (UTC+6)	Kouadja (yellow card) 11'; Bocharov 80'	Summary	E.Abdrakhmanov (yellow card) 10'; R.Rozybakiev (yellow card) 30'; Sergienko (yellow card) 90'	Stadium: Central Stadium; Attendance: 4,000; Referee: Askhat Abdanbayev

10 July 2016 20	Atyrau	1 – 1	Aktobe	Atyrau
20:00 (UTC+6)	A.Saparov (yellow card) 47'; Arzhanov 53'; V.Chureyev (yellow card) 63'	Summary	B.Kairov (yellow card) 50'; Sorokin (yellow card) 56'; Bocharov 86'	Stadium: Munaishy Stadium; Attendance: 2,500; Referee: Ruslan Duzmambetov

17 July 2016 21	Aktobe	2 – 0	Shakhter Karagandy	Aktobe
20:00 (UTC+6)	Dao 22'; Mitošević (yellow card) 56'; Shchotkin 58'	Summary	Serečin (yellow card) 69'; Baizhanov (yellow card) 72'	Stadium: Central Stadium; Attendance: 4,000; Referee: Marat Iskakov

24 July 2016 24	Aktobe	0 – 0	Ordabasy	Aktobe
20:00 (UTC+6)	B.Kairov (yellow card) 65'; Shestakov (yellow card) 73'	Summary		Stadium: Central Stadium; Attendance: 5,200; Referee: Denis Izmailov

===== League table =====
Pos	Team	Pld	W	D	L	GF	GA	GD	Pts	Qualification
4	Okzhetpes	22	11	4	7	33	23	+10	37	Qualification for the championship round
5	Ordabasy	22	9	6	7	26	27	−1	33	Qualification for the championship round
6	Aktobe	22	7	7	8	23	32	−9	28 (Note: Head-to-head record: Aktobe (7 points), Atyrau (5 points), Tobol (4 points).)	Qualification for the championship round
7	Atyrau	22	7	7	8	21	23	−2	28	Qualification for the relegation round
8	Tobol	22	8	4	10	28	26	+2	28	Qualification for the relegation round

Source: UEFA.com, Soccerway
Rules for classification: 1) Points; 2) Head-to-head points; 3) Head-to-head matches won; 4) Head-to-head goal difference; 5) Head-to-head goals scored; 6) Head-to-head away goals scored; 7) Goal difference; 8) Matches won; 9) Goals scored; 10) Away goals scored; 11) Draw.

==== Championship round ====
===== Results summary =====
Overall								Home						Away					
Pld	W	D	L	GF	GA	GD	Pts	W	D	L	GF	GA	GD	W	D	L	GF	GA	GD
10	2	2	6	12	18	−6	8	1	2	2	6	7	−1	1	0	4	6	11	−5

Last updated: 31 October 2016.
Source: See Results

===== Results by round =====
Round	1	2	3	4	5	6	7	8	9	10
Ground	H	A	H	H	H	H	A	H	A	A
Result	D	L	W	W	L	L	L	D	L	L
Position	6	6	6	6	6	6	6	6	6	6

Source: See Results
A = Away; H = Home; W = Win; D = Draw; L = Loss

===== Results =====
13 August 2016 1	Aktobe	4 – 4	Ordabasy	Aktobe
20:00 (UTC+6)	Shchotkin 39', 88'; A.Kakimov 45+1'; V.Kryukov (yellow card) 77' (goal) 84'; A.Abdukarimov (yellow card) 79'	Summary	Martsvaladze 16'; Geynrikh (yellow card) 55' (goal) 57' (pen.), 77' (pen.), 90+5'	Stadium: Central Stadium; Attendance: 5,150; Referee: Bagdat Abdullaev

20 August 2016 2	Kairat	3 – 1	Aktobe	Almaty
20:00 (UTC+6)	Islamkhan 48' (pen.); G.Suyumbaev 62'; Gohou 65'	Summary	Shchotkin 31'	Stadium: Central Stadium; Attendance: 10,000; Referee: Anatolyi Vishnichenko

26 August 2016 3	Aktobe	1 – 0	Irtysh Pavlodar	Aktobe
20:00 (UTC+6)	Kouadja (yellow card) 56'; Bocharov 62'; Davlatov (yellow card) 65'	Summary		Stadium: Central Stadium; Attendance: 4,000; Referee: Furkat Atajanow

12 September 2016 4	Okzhetpes	0 – 3	Aktobe	Astana
19:00 (UTC+6)	Chichulin (yellow card) 54'	Summary	Bocharov 15'; Tsveiba (yellow card) 33'; Shchotkin 49', 90+5'; B.Kairov (yellow card) 57'; D.Zhalmukan (yellow card) 77'	Stadium: Astana Arena; Attendance: 1,500; Referee: Igor Aleshin

18 September 2016 5	Aktobe	1 – 2	Astana	Aktobe
20:00 (UTC+6)	Sorokin 66'; S.Otarbayev (yellow card) 88'; Nikolić (yellow card) 90+1'	Summary	Kabananga 11'; A.Tagybergen (yellow card) 62'; Aničić 87'	Stadium: Central Stadium; Attendance: 7,000; Referee: Denis Izmailov

25 September 2016 6	Aktobe	0 – 1	Kairat	Aktobe
20:00 (UTC+6)	B.Kairov (yellow card) 9'; Sitdikov (yellow card) 70'; Sorokin (yellow card) 90'	Summary	Kuat (yellow card) 26'; Arshavin 35'; A.Darabayev (yellow card) 90'	Stadium: Central Stadium; Attendance: 7,500; Referee: Anatolyi Vishnichenko

1 October 2016 7	Irtysh Pavlodar	5 – 1	Aktobe	Pavlodar
17:00 (UTC+6)	Grigalashvili 16'; G.Sartakov (yellow card) 29'; Fonseca 36', 41'; Murtazayev 44', 90+2'	Summary	B.Kairov (yellow card) 3'; Bocharov 76'	Stadium: Central Stadium; Attendance: 3,500; Referee: Aleksandr Gauzer

15 October 2016 8	Aktobe	2 – 2	Okzhetpes	Aktobe
18:00 (UTC+6)	Abilgazy 37' (o.g.); Tsveiba (yellow card) 69'; Sorokin (yellow card) 71'; A.Kakimov (yellow card) 76'; D.Zhalmukan 79'	Summary	S.N'Ganbe 33', 84'; Kozhamberdi (yellow card) 45+1'; M.Tuliyev (yellow card) 51'; Yurin (yellow card) 65'	Stadium: Central Stadium; Attendance: 3,500; Referee: Aydin Rakhimbayev

23 October 2016 9	Astana	1 – 0	Aktobe	Astana
15:00 (UTC+6)	Despotović 12'	Summary	Tsveiba (yellow card) 29'; Kouadja (yellow card) 58'; Sorokin (yellow card) 78' (yellow-red card) 89'	Stadium: Astana Arena; Attendance: 5,500; Referee: Aleksandr Gauzer

29 October 2016 10	Ordabasy	2 – 1	Aktobe	Shymkent
15:00 (UTC+6)	M.Tolebek 40'; Simčević (yellow card) 75'; Ashirbekov (yellow card) 77'; Geynrikh 88' (pen.)	Summary	A.Kakimov 5' (yellow card) 51'; B.Kairov (yellow card) 37'; Bocharov (yellow card) 73'; Shestakov (yellow card) 90+2'	Stadium: Kazhymukan Munaitpasov Stadium; Attendance: 3,000; Referee: Aleksandr Aliyev

===== League table =====
Pos	Team	Pld	W	D	L	GF	GA	GD	Pts	Qualification
1	Astana (C)	32	23	4	5	47	21	+26	73	Qualification for the Champions League second qualifying round (Note: Astana qualified for the Europa League first qualifying round by winning the 2016 Kazakhstan Cup. However, since they already qualified for European competition based on their league position, the spot awarded to the cup winners was passed down the league.)
2	Kairat	32	22	5	5	75	30	+45	71	Qualification for the Europa League first qualifying round
3	Irtysh Pavlodar	32	14	7	11	52	36	+16	49	Qualification for the Europa League first qualifying round
4	Ordabasy	32	13	9	10	41	44	−3	48	Qualification for the Europa League first qualifying round
5	Okzhetpes	32	13	6	13	42	44	−2	45	
6	Aktobe	32	9	9	14	37	52	−15	36	

Source: Soccerway
Rules for classification: 1) Points; 2) Play-off (only if deciding champion when two teams are tied); 3) Head-to-head points; 4) Head-to-head matches won; 5) Head-to-head goal difference; 6) Head-to-head goals scored; 7) Head-to-head away goals scored; 8) Goal difference; 9) Matches won; 10) Goals scored; 11) Away goals scored; 12) Draw.
(C) Champions

=== Kazakhstan Cup ===
27 April 2016 Last 16	Aktobe	0 – 1	Zhetysu	Aktobe
20:00 (UTC+6)	D.Zhalmukan (yellow card) 64'; Smakov (yellow card) 87'	Summary	A.Shabaev (yellow card) 42'; Savić 65'; Simonovski (yellow card) 90'	Stadium: Central Stadium; Attendance: 5,500; Referee: Sergey Gorokhovodatskiy

=== UEFA Europa League ===
==== Qualifying rounds ====
30 June 2016 First qualifying round 1st leg	Aktobe (Kazakhstan)	1 – 1	(Hungary) MTK Budapest	Aktobe, Kazakhstan
20:00 (UTC+6)	Zhalmukan 44' (pen.); Sitdikov (yellow card) 72'; Sorokin (yellow card) 86'	Report	Torghelle 30'; Nikač (yellow card) 83'; Borbély (yellow card) 89'	Stadium: Central Stadium; Attendance: 8,600; Referee: Sascha Amhof (Switzerland)

7 July 2016 First qualifying round 2nd leg	MTK Budapest (Hungary)	2 – 0 (3 – 1 agg.)	(Kazakhstan) Aktobe	Győr, (Note: MTK Budapest will play their home match at Ménfői út, Győr, instead of their temporary stadium Stadion Rudolf Illovszky, Budapest.) Hungary
20:00 (UTC+6)	Nikač 8'; Bese 85'	Report		Stadium: Ménfői út Referee: Nikolay Yordanov (Bulgaria)

== Squad statistics ==
As of Match played 29 October 2016

=== Appearances and goals ===
No.	Pos	Nat	Player	Total		Premier League		Kazakhstan Cup		UEFA Europa League	
No.	Pos	Nat	Player	Apps	Goals	Apps	Goals	Apps	Goals	Apps	Goals
2	MF	(Russia) RUS	Marat Sitdikov	34	0	32	0	0	0	2	0
3	DF	(Ivory Coast) CIV	Kouassi Kouadja	31	0	27+2	0	0	0	2	0
5	DF	(Kazakhstan) KAZ	Bagdat Kairov	24	0	21	0	0+1	0	2	0
6	MF	(Kazakhstan) KAZ	Viktor Kryukov	28	1	21+4	1	1	0	2	0
7	DF	(Kazakhstan) KAZ	Abat Aimbetov	3	0	1+1	0	1	0	0	0
10	MF	(Kazakhstan) KAZ	Didar Zhalmukan	31	7	19+9	6	1	0	2	1
11	MF	(Uzbekistan) UZB	Bobir Davlatov	13	1	11+2	1	0	0	0	0
14	DF	(Russia) RUS	Sandro Tsveiba	31	1	16+12	1	1	0	2	0
17	MF	(Kazakhstan) KAZ	Nurbol Zhumashev	3	0	0+2	0	1	0	0	0
21	DF	(Kazakhstan) KAZ	Yegor Azovskiy	18	0	11+6	0	1	0	0	0
22	MF	(Kazakhstan) KAZ	Kirill Shestakov	28	1	19+8	1	0	0	0+1	0
25	DF	(Kazakhstan) KAZ	Sayat Zhumagali	4	0	2+1	0	1	0	0	0
32	GK	(Kazakhstan) KAZ	Samat Otarbayev	30	0	28	0	0	0	2	0
33	MF	(Serbia) SRB	Vuk Mitošević	15	0	11+2	0	0	0	2	0
35	GK	(Kazakhstan) KAZ	Stanislav Pavlov	5	0	2+2	0	1	0	0	0
37	MF	(Kazakhstan) KAZ	Abilkhan Abdukarimov	6	0	0+5	0	0	0	0+1	0
42	GK	(Kazakhstan) KAZ	Igor Trofimets	2	0	2	0	0	0	0	0
47	MF	(Kazakhstan) KAZ	Aslanbek Kakimov	21	3	16+5	3	0	0	0	0
69	MF	(Russia) RUS	Nikita Bocharov	33	7	31	7	0	0	2	0
72	FW	(Serbia) SRB	Nemanja Nikolić	5	0	0+5	0	0	0	0	0
80	DF	(Russia) RUS	Yegor Sorokin	31	1	28+1	1	0	0	2	0
81	MF	(Kazakhstan) KAZ	Anton Skvortsov	1	0	0+1	0	0	0	0	0
87	MF	(Kazakhstan) KAZ	Igor Boichuk	9	0	4+5	0	0	0	0	0
88	FW	(Kazakhstan) KAZ	Aleksey Shchotkin	8	6	7+1	6	0	0	0	0
Players away from Aktobe on loan:
Players who appeared for Aktobe that left during the season:
8	DF	(Kazakhstan) KAZ	Samat Smakov	13	5	11+1	5	1	0	0	0
9	MF	(Kazakhstan) KAZ	Abylaykhan Totay	4	0	2+1	0	1	0	0	0
18	FW	(Kazakhstan) KAZ	Toktar Zhangylyshbay	12	2	7+5	2	0	0	0	0
19	FW	(Kazakhstan) KAZ	Sergey Lisenkov	1	0	1	0	0	0	0	0
23	FW	(Ukraine) UKR	Ilya Mikhalyov	9	0	7+1	0	1	0	0	0
24	FW	(Russia) RUS	Mikhail Petrolay	12	0	12	0	0	0	0	0
39	FW	(Kazakhstan) KAZ	Murat Tleshev	6	0	0+6	0	0	0	0	0
77	FW	(Ivory Coast) CIV	Lassina Dao	7	1	2+3	1	0	0	2	0
85	FW	(Russia) RUS	Dmitry Golubov	5	1	1+1	1	1	0	0+2	0

=== Goal scorers ===
Place	Position	Nation	Number	Name	Premier League	Kazakhstan Cup	UEFA Europa League	Total
1	MF	(Russia)	63	Nikita Bocharov	7	0	0	7
1	MF	(Kazakhstan)	10	Didar Zhalmukan	6	0	1	7
3	FW	(Kazakhstan)	88	Aleksey Shchotkin	6	0	0	6
4	DF	(Kazakhstan)	8	Samat Smakov	5	0	0	5
5	MF	(Kazakhstan)	47	Aslanbek Kakimov	3	0	0	3
6	FW	(Kazakhstan)	29	Toktar Zhangylyshbay	2	0	0	2
7	MF	(Uzbekistan)	11	Bobir Davlatov	1	0	0	1
7	DF	(Russia)	14	Sandro Tsveiba	1	0	0	1
7	MF	(Kazakhstan)	22	Kirill Shestakov	1	0	0	1
7	FW	(Russia)	85	Dmitry Golubov	1	0	0	1
7	FW	(Ivory Coast)	77	Lassina Dao	1	0	0	1
7	MF	(Kazakhstan)	6	Viktor Kryukov	1	0	0	1
7	DF	(Russia)	80	Yegor Sorokin	1	0	0	1
7				Own goal	1	0	0	1
				TOTALS	34	0	1	37

=== Disciplinary record ===
Number	Nation	Position	Name	Premier League		Kazakhstan Cup		UEFA Europa League		Total	
Number	Nation	Position	Name	Yellow card	Red card	Yellow card	Red card	Yellow card	Red card	Yellow card	Red card
2	(Russia)	MF	Marat Sitdikov	3	0	0	0	1	0	4	0
3	(Ivory Coast)	DF	Kouassi Kouadja	8	0	0	0	0	0	8	0
5	(Kazakhstan)	DF	Bagdat Kairov	10	1	0	0	0	0	10	1
6	(Kazakhstan)	MF	Viktor Kryukov	5	0	0	0	0	0	5	0
8	(Kazakhstan)	DF	Samat Smakov	1	0	1	0	0	0	2	0
9	(Kazakhstan)	MF	Abylaykhan Totay	1	0	0	0	0	0	1	0
10	(Kazakhstan)	MF	Didar Zhalmukan	3	0	1	0	0	0	4	0
11	(Uzbekistan)	MF	Bobir Davlatov	1	0	0	0	0	0	1	0
14	(Russia)	DF	Sandro Tsveiba	4	0	0	0	0	0	4	0
21	(Kazakhstan)	DF	Yegor Azovskiy	2	0	0	0	0	0	2	0
22	(Kazakhstan)	MF	Kirill Shestakov	3	0	0	0	0	0	3	0
23	(Ukraine)	FW	Ilya Mikhalyov	1	0	0	0	0	0	1	0
24	(Russia)	FW	Mikhail Petrolay	1	0	0	0	0	0	1	0
29	(Kazakhstan)	FW	Toktar Zhangylyshbay	4	0	0	0	0	0	4	0
32	(Kazakhstan)	GK	Samat Otarbayev	1	0	0	0	0	0	1	0
33	(Serbia)	MF	Vuk Mitošević	1	0	0	0	0	0	1	0
37	(Kazakhstan)	FW	Abilkhan Abdukarimov	1	0	0	0	0	0	1	0
39	(Kazakhstan)	FW	Murat Tleshev	2	0	0	0	0	0	2	0
47	(Kazakhstan)	MF	Aslanbek Kakimov	4	0	0	0	0	0	4	0
69	(Russia)	MF	Nikita Bocharov	2	0	0	0	0	0	2	0
72	(Serbia)	FW	Nemanja Nikolić	1	0	0	0	0	0	1	0
80	(Russia)	DF	Yegor Sorokin	8	1	0	0	1	0	9	1
			TOTALS	65	2	2	0	2	0	69	2
