= Azovsky =

Azovsky (masculine, Russian Азовский), Azovskaya (feminine, Азовская), or Azovskoye (neuter, Азовское) may refer to:

- Azovsky District, a district of Rostov Oblast, Russia
- Azovsky Nemetsky National District, a district of Omsk Oblast, Russia
- Azovsky (inhabited locality) (Azovskaya, Azovskoye), several inhabited localities in Russia
- Azovske, a small village in Crimea, Ukraine.

== See also ==
- Azov (disambiguation)
- Azovo
- Azovskiy, a surname
