= Azovskiy =

Azovskiy is a surname, Russian and Kazakh Азовский. Notable people with the surname include:

- Yegor Azovskiy (born 1985), Kazakh footballer
- Maksim Azovskiy, Kazakh footballer

== See also ==
- Azovsky (disambiguation)
