= Tsveiba =

Tsveiba (Abkhazian: Цәеиба; Russian: Цвейба) is an Abkhazian surname that may refer to:

- Akhrik Tsveiba (born 1966), Soviet association football defender
- Sandro Tsveiba (born 1993), Ukrainian-born Russian football player, son of Akhrik
