= Azovo =

Azovo (Russian: Азово) is the name of several rural localities in Russia:

- Azovo, Republic of Bashkortostan, a village in Uzunlarovsky Selsoviet of Arkhangelsky District of the Republic of Bashkortostan
- Azovo, Omsk Oblast, a selo in Azovsky Rural Okrug of Azovsky Nemetsky National District of Omsk Oblast
- Azovo, Perm Krai, a village in Karagaysky District of Perm Krai
- Azovo, Pskov Oblast, a village in Pytalovsky District of Pskov Oblast
