= Azovsky (inhabited locality) =

Azovsky (Russian: Азовский; masculine), Azovskaya (Азовская; feminine), Azovskoye (Азовское; neuter), or Azovskiye (Азовские; plural) is the name of several inhabited localities in Russia.

Urban localities

- Azovskoye, Dzhankoysky District, Republic of Crimea, an urban-type settlement in Dzhankoysky District of the Republic of Crimea

Rural localities

- Azovsky, Astrakhan Oblast, a settlement in Razdorsky Selsoviet of Kamyzyaksky District in Astrakhan Oblast; 46°7′N 48°9′E
- Azovskoye, Leninsky District, Republic of Crimea, a selo in Leninsky District of the Republic of Crimea
- Azovskoye, Kaliningrad Oblast, a settlement in Dobrinsky Rural Okrug of Guryevsky District in Kaliningrad Oblast
- Azovskaya, a stanitsa in Azovsky Rural Okrug of Seversky District in Krasnodar Krai; 44°48′N 38°38′E
- Azovskiye, a village in Nytvensky District of Perm Krai
