= Azovsky, Astrakhan Oblast =

Azovsky Азовский
- Settlement
- Location within Astrakhan Oblast Location within Russia
- Coordinates: 46°07′N 48°09′E
- Country: Russia
- Region: Astrakhan Oblast
- District: Kamyzyaksky District
- Time zone: UTC+4:00

Azovsky (Russian: Азовский) is a rural locality (a settlement) in Razdorsky Selsoviet, Kamyzyaksky District, Astrakhan Oblast, Russia. The population was 241 as of 2010. There are 3 streets.

== Geography ==
Azovsky is located 9 km northeast of Kamyzyak (the district's administrative centre) by road. Kamyzyak is the nearest rural locality.
