= Azovo, Republic of Bashkortostan =

Azovo Азово
- Village
- Location within Bashkortostan Location within Russia
- Coordinates: 54°27′N 57°05′E
- Country: Russia
- Region: Bashkortostan
- District: Arkhangelsky District

Population (2010)
  - Total: 461
- Time zone: UTC+5:00

Azovo (Russian: Азово; Bashkir: Аҙау, Aźaw) is a rural locality (a village) in Uzunlarovsky Selsoviet, Arkhangelsky District, Bashkortostan, Russia. The population was 461 as of 2010. There are 7 streets.

== Geography ==
Azovo is located 35 km northeast of Arkhangelskoye (the district's administrative centre) by road. Ravtau is the nearest rural locality.

== See also ==
- Arkhangelsky District
- Bashkortostan
- List of rural localities in Bashkortostan
