= Marat Sitdikov =

Russian footballer

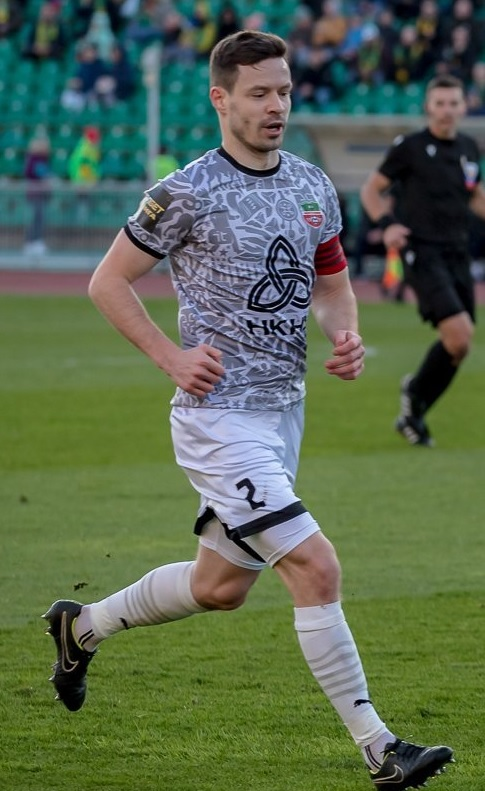
- Sitdikov with Neftekhimik in 2022

Personal information
- Full name: Marat Rustemovich Sitdikov
- Date of birth: 23 July 1991 (age 35)
- Place of birth: Kazan, Russian SFSR
- Height: 1.72 m (5 ft 8 in)
- Position: Midfielder

Team information
- Current team: Neftekhimik Nizhnekamsk
- Number: 2

Youth career
- –2008: Rubin Kazan
- 2010–2011: Rubin Kazan

Senior career*
Years	Team	Apps	(Gls)
2008–2010	Rubin-2 Kazan	39	(0)
2012	Neftekhimik Nizhnekamsk	2	(0)
2014–2015	Rubin Kazan	0	(0)
2014–2015	→ Rubin-2 Kazan	21	(1)
2015	Dnepr Smolensk	16	(0)
2016	Aktobe	32	(0)
2017–	Neftekhimik Nizhnekamsk	230	(3)

International career
2008	Russia U-17	6	(0)
2009	Russia U-18	4	(1)
- * Club domestic league appearances and goals as of 16 May 2026

Marat Rustemovich Sitdikov (Russian: Марат Рустемович Ситдиков; born 23 July 1991) is a Russian professional football player who plays for Neftekhimik Nizhnekamsk.

== Club career ==
He made his Russian Football National League debut for Neftekhimik Nizhnekamsk on 8 March 2017 in a game against Zenit-2 Saint Petersburg.

== Career statistics ==
As of 16 May 2026

Club	Season	League			Cup		Continental		Total	
Club	Season	Division	Apps	Goals	Apps	Goals	Apps	Goals	Apps	Goals
Rubin-2 Kazan	2008	Russian Second League	9	0	0	0	—		9	0
Rubin-2 Kazan	2009	Russian Second League	28	0	2	0	—		30	0
Rubin-2 Kazan	2010	Russian Second League	2	0	1	0	—		3	0
Rubin-2 Kazan	Total		39	0	3	0	0	0	42	0
Neftekhimik Nizhnekamsk	2011–12	Russian Second League	2	0	—		—		2	0
Rubin Kazan	2014–15	Russian Premier League	0	0	0	0	—		0	0
Rubin-2 Kazan	2014–15	Russian Second League	21	1	—		—		21	1
Dnepr Smolensk	2015–16	Russian Second League	16	0	—		—		16	0
Aktobe	2016	Kazakhstan Premier League	32	0	0	0	2 (Note: Appearances in the UEFA Europa League)	0	34	0
Neftekhimik Nizhnekamsk	2016–17	Russian First League	8	1	—		—		8	1
Neftekhimik Nizhnekamsk	2017–18	Russian Second League	20	0	1	0	—		21	0
Neftekhimik Nizhnekamsk	2018–19	Russian Second League	18	0	3	0	—		21	0
Neftekhimik Nizhnekamsk	2019–20	Russian First League	26	0	0	0	—		26	0
Neftekhimik Nizhnekamsk	2020–21	Russian First League	25	0	0	0	—		25	0
Neftekhimik Nizhnekamsk	2021–22	Russian First League	21	1	1	0	—		22	1
Neftekhimik Nizhnekamsk	2022–23	Russian First League	28	0	1	0	—		29	0
Neftekhimik Nizhnekamsk	2023–24	Russian First League	29	0	1	0	—		30	0
Neftekhimik Nizhnekamsk	2024–25	Russian First League	34	0	1	0	—		35	0
Neftekhimik Nizhnekamsk	2025–26	Russian First League	21	1	2	0	—		23	1
Neftekhimik Nizhnekamsk	Total		230	3	10	0	0	0	240	3
Career total			340	4	13	0	2	0	355	4
