= Bobir Davlatov =

Uzbek footballer

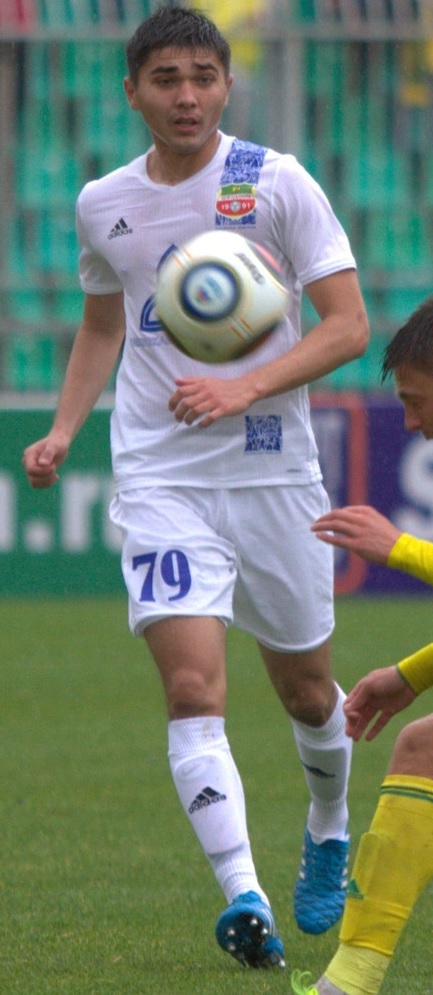
- Davlatov with Neftekhimik in 2017

Personal information
- Full name: Bobir Bahodir o'g'li Davlatov
- Date of birth: 1 March 1995 (age 31)
- Place of birth: Yangiyer, Uzbekistan
- Height: 1.80 m (5 ft 11 in)
- Position: Midfielder

Team information
- Current team: Metallurg Bekabad

Senior career*
Years	Team	Apps	(Gls)
2012	Mash'al Mubarek	5	(0)
2013–2016	Rubin Kazan	0	(0)
2015	→ Zhetysu (loan)	9	(0)
2016	→ Aktobe (loan)	13	(1)
2017	Neftekhimik Nizhnekamsk	5	(0)
2017	Lokomotiv Tashkent	1	(0)
2018–2019	Nasaf	31	(5)
2019	Neftekhimik Nizhnekamsk	0	(0)
2020–2021	Neftekhimik Nizhnekamsk	15	(0)
2021–	Metallurg Bekabad	0	(0)

International career
2011	Uzbekistan U-17	5	(1)
2014	Uzbekistan U-19	2	(0)
- * Club domestic league appearances and goals as of 13 August 2021

Bobir Bahodir o'g'li Davlatov (Russian: Бобир Баходир Угли Давлатов; born 1 March 1995 ) is an Uzbek professional footballer. He plays for Metallurg Bekabad.

== Career ==
=== Club ===
In July 2015, Davlatov moved to FC Zhetysu with fellow Rubin Kazan teammates Mikhail Petrolay, Ruslan Galiakberov and Ilsur Samigullin.

After playing in the Rubin Kazan youth system, he joined FC Aktobe, where he was frequently in the starting lineup. In 13 appearances, he made 3 assists and scored one goal.

In 2017, he signed with the Russian team FC Neftekhimik Nizhnekamsk.

After playing back in Uzbekistan for 2 years, he returned to Neftekhimik on 28 August 2019.

=== International ===
Playing for the Uzbekistan U-17 side in 2011, he scored the opening goal in a 2-1 win over the United States.

== Personal life ==
In 2014 Davlatov attempted unsuccessfully to acquire British citizenship.

He returned to his hometown of Yangiyer for a short time to take college tests.
