= Andrei Sidelnikov =

Kazakhstani footballer

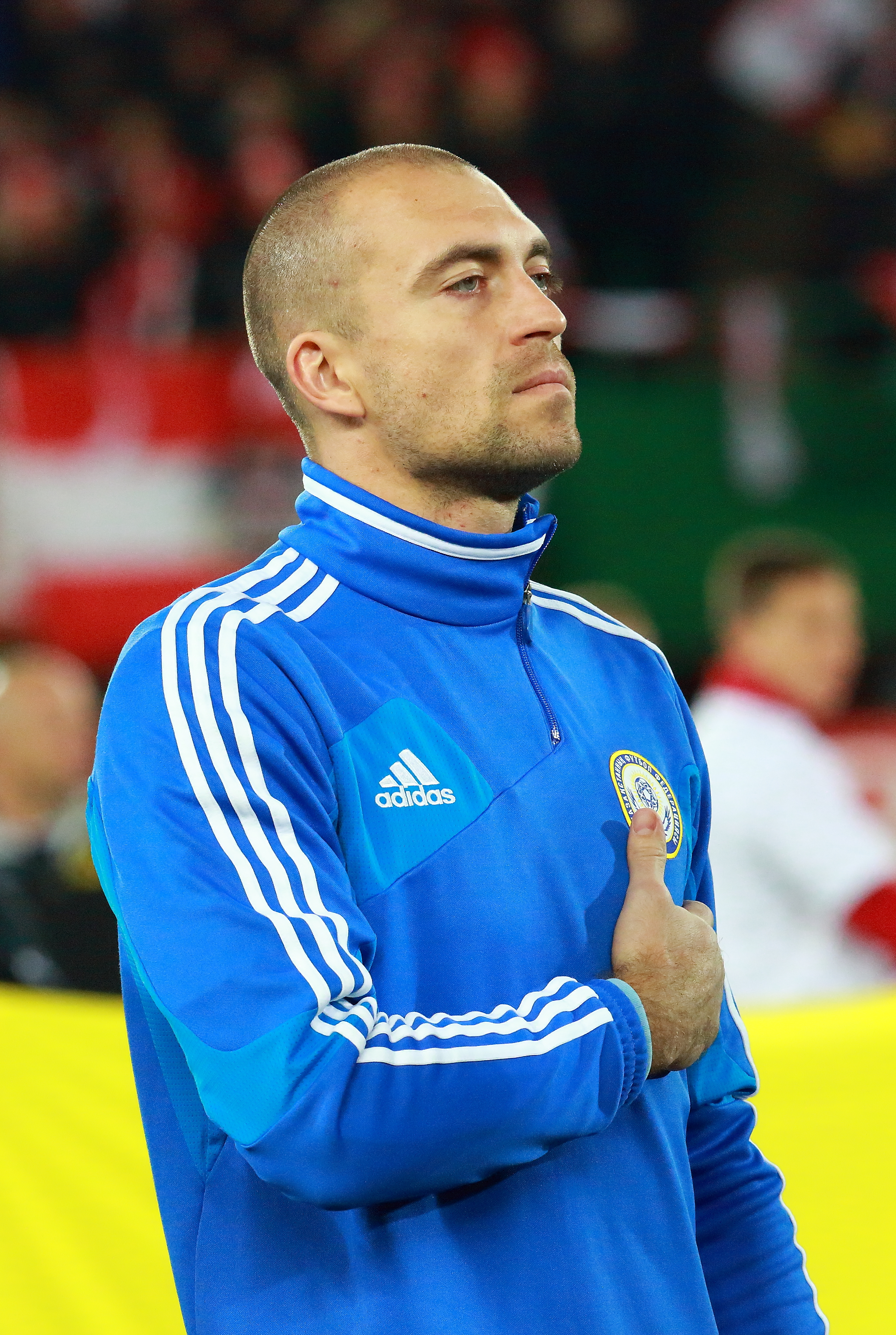
- Sidelnikov in 2012

Personal information
- Full name: Andrei Gennadyevich Sidelnikov
- Date of birth: 8 March 1980 (age 46)
- Place of birth: Moscow, Soviet Union
- Height: 1.90 m (6 ft 3 in)
- Position: Goalkeeper

Youth career
- 1996–1997: Heerenveen
- 1997–1998: Spartak Moscow

Senior career*
Years	Team	Apps	(Gls)
1997–2000	Spartak Moscow	0	(0)
1998–2000	→ Spartak-2 Moscow	29	(0)
2000	→ Spartak Tambov (loan)	11	(0)
2001–2002	Dinamo Minsk	14	(0)
2003–2005	Khimki	0	(0)
2004	→ Spartak Tambov (loan)	13	(0)
2005	Dynamo Makhachkala	27	(0)
2006	Spartak Vladikavkaz	29	(0)
2007	Spartak Nalchik	3	(0)
2008	Rusichi Oryol	12	(0)
2008–2014	Aktobe	177	(0)
2015	Ordabasy	11	(0)
2016	Kairat	1	(0)
2017	Aktobe	23	(0)

International career
2010–2015	Kazakhstan	26	(0)
- * Club domestic league appearances and goals

Andrei Gennadyevich Sidelnikov (Russian: Андрей Геннадьевич Сидельников; born 8 March 1980) is a former professional footballer. Born in Russia, he played for the Kazakhstan national team.

== Career ==
On 29 December 2014, Sidelnikov was released by FC Aktobe.

On 24 January 2018, Sidelnikov announced his retirement from football.

== Honours ==
=== Aktobe ===
- Kazakhstan Super Cup (1): 2014
