= Kouassi Kouadja =

Ivorian footballer (born 1995)

Personal information
- Full name: Kouassi Kouadja Isso
- Date of birth: 22 June 1995 (age 31)
- Place of birth: Abidjan, Ivory Coast
- Height: 1.83 m (6 ft 0 in)
- Position: Centre back

Team information
- Current team: Haras El Hodood

Youth career
- Egnanda de Zaranou

Senior career*
| Years | Team | Apps | (Gls) |
| 2014–2015 | Saxan | 15 | (0) |
| 2015 | → Astra Giurgiu (loan) | 1 | (0) |
| 2015 | Slutsk | 12 | (0) |
| 2016 | Aktobe | 29 | (0) |
| 2017 | Slutsk | 7 | (0) |
| 2017 | Tambov | 0 | (0) |
| 2018–2020 | Cape Town City | 5 | (0) |
| 2020–2021 | Aktobe | 7 | (0) |
| 2022 | Renaissance | | |
| 2022–2023 | Fovu Club | | |
| 2023–2024 | Power Dynamos | | |
| 2024– | Haras El Hodood | 12 | (0) |
- * Club domestic league appearances and goals as of 13 February 2025

Kouassi Kouadja (born 22 June 1995) is an Ivorian footballer, who plays as a defender for Haras El Hodood.

== Career ==
In February 2016, Kouadja signed for Kazakhstan Premier League side FC Aktobe.

On 29 March 2017, Kouadja re-signed for FC Slutsk, leaving the club when his contract expired 8 June of the same year.

== Career statistics ==
As of match played 3 June 2017

Appearances and goals by club, season and competition
| Club | Season | League | | | National Cup | | Continental | | Total | |
| Club | Season | Division | Apps | Goals | Apps | Goals | Apps | Goals | Apps | Goals |
|---|---|---|---|---|---|---|---|---|---|---|
| Saxan Gagauz Yeri | 2014–15 | Divizia Națională | 15 | 0 | 0 | 0 | 2 | 0 | 17 | 0 |
| Astra Giurgiu (loan) | 2014–15 | Liga I | 1 | 0 | 0 | 0 | – | | 1 | 0 |
| Slutsk | 2015 | Belarusian Premier League | 12 | 0 | 3 | 0 | – | | 15 | 0 |
| Aktobe | 2016 | Kazakhstan Premier League | 29 | 0 | 0 | 0 | 2 | 0 | 31 | 0 |
| Slutsk | 2017 | Belarusian Premier League | 7 | 0 | 0 | 0 | – | | 7 | 0 |
| Tambov | 2017–18 | Russian Football National League | 0 | 0 | 0 | 0 | – | | 0 | 0 |
| Career total | | | 64 | 0 | 3 | 0 | 4 | 0 | 71 | 0 |
