= Nikita Bocharov =

Russian professional football player

Personal information
- Full name: Nikita Vladimirovich Bocharov
- Date of birth: 12 June 1992 (age 34)
- Place of birth: Saint Petersburg, Russia
- Height: 1.85 m (6 ft 1 in)
- Position: Midfielder

Youth career
- Zenit St.Petersburg

Senior career*
Years	Team	Apps	(Gls)
2009–2011	Zenit St.Petersburg	0	(0)
2012–2015	Rubin Kazan	1	(0)
2012–2014	→ Neftekhimik Nizhnekamsk (loan)	26	(0)
2014–2015	→ Rubin-2 Kazan (loan)	16	(4)
2015	Tom-2 Tomsk	5	(2)
2016	Aktobe	31	(7)
2017–2018	Ordabasy	65	(2)
2019–2020	Tobol	15	(1)
2021	Turan	20	(0)

International career
2010	Russia U-18	2	(1)
2010–2011	Russia U-19	5	(1)
2012–2013	Russia U-21	7	(2)
- * Club domestic league appearances and goals

Nikita Vladimirovich Bocharov (Russian: Никита Владимирович Бочаров; born 12 June 1992) is a Russian former professional football player.

== Career ==
Bocharov made his Russian Premier League debut for FC Rubin Kazan on 6 May 2012 in a game against FC Anzhi Makhachkala.

In February 2016, Bocharov signed a two-year contract with Kazakhstan Premier League side FC Aktobe.

On 21 January 2019, FC Tobol announced the signing of Bocharov on a two-year contract. On 21 February 2020, Bocharov was released by Tobol.
