= Vladimir Loginovsky =

Kazakh football player (born 1985)

Personal information
- Full name: Vladimir Aleksandrovich Loginovsky
- Date of birth: 8 October 1985 (age 41)
- Place of birth: Petropavl, Kazakh SSR, Soviet Union
- Height: 1.92 m (6 ft 3 1/2 in)
- Position: Goalkeeper

Senior career*
Years	Team	Apps	(Gls)
2002–2009	Kyzylzhar	68	(0)
2010–2012	Zhetysu	37	(0)
2013–2017	Astana	20	(0)
2016	→ Tobol (loan)	24	(0)
2017	Taraz	7	(0)
2018–2019	Atyrau	33	(0)
2020–2021	Atyrau	14	(0)

International career^{‡}
2011–	Kazakhstan	2	(0)
- * Club domestic league appearances and goals as of 6 January 2022 ‡ National team caps and goals as of 15:38, 13 December 2012 (UTC)

Vladimir Aleksandrovich Loginovsky (Russian: Владимир Александрович Логиновский; born 8 October 1985) is a Kazakh football player who last played for Atyrau in the Kazakhstan Premier League.

== Career ==
=== Club ===
After leaving Atyrau during the summer of 2019, Loginovsky re-signed for Atyrau in January 2020.

=== International ===
He first appeared for the Kazakhstan national team in 2011.

== Career statistics ==
=== International ===
Kazakhstan
Year	Apps	Goals
2011	1	0
2012	1	0
Total	2	0

Statistics accurate as of match played 29 February 2012
