= Mikhail Petrolay =

Russian footballer

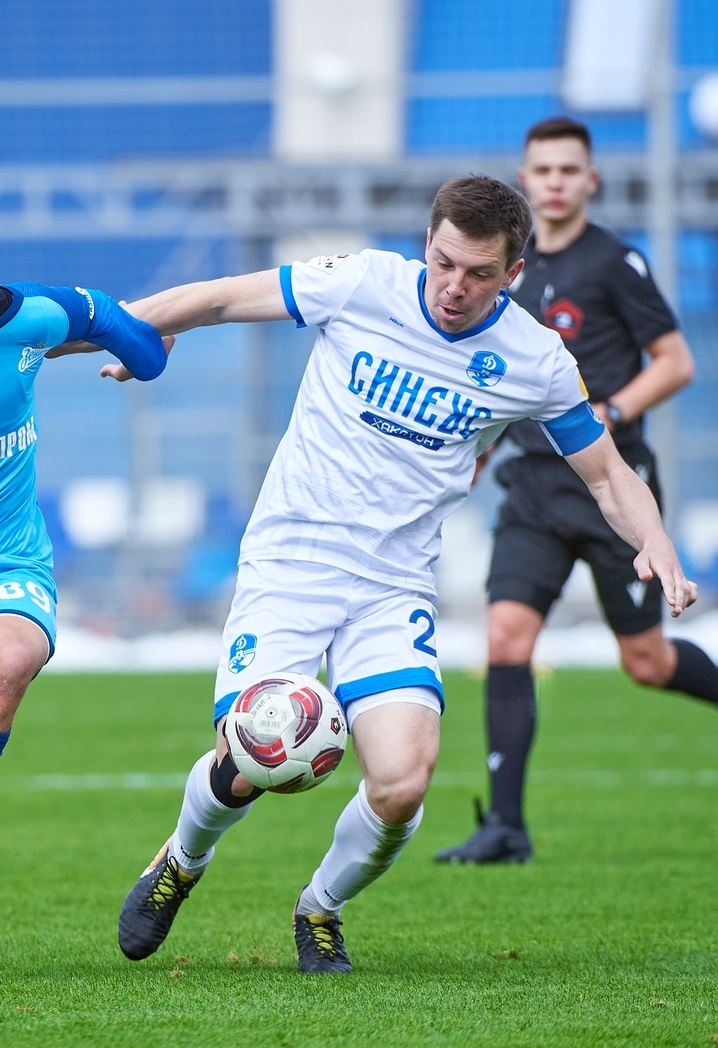
- Petrolay with Dynamo Vologda in 2024

Personal information
- Full name: Mikhail Nikolayevich Petrolay
- Date of birth: 19 August 1994 (age 32)
- Place of birth: Tolyatti, Samara Oblast, Russia
- Height: 1.79 m (5 ft 10 in)
- Positions: Defender; midfielder

Team information
- Current team: FC Dynamo Vologda
- Number: 2

Youth career
- 2003–2008: Konoplyov football academy
- 2008–2011: FC Rubin Kazan

Senior career*
Years	Team	Apps	(Gls)
2012–2015	FC Rubin-2 Kazan	72	(5)
2015	→ FC Zhetysu (loan)	8	(0)
2016	FC Aktobe	12	(0)
2017–2019	FC Neftekhimik Nizhnekamsk	43	(5)
2019–2020	FC Murom	15	(2)
2020–2021	FC Spartak Tuymazy (amateur)		
2021	FC Spartak Tuymazy	17	(2)
2022	FC Volga Ulyanovsk	3	(0)
2022–	FC Dynamo Vologda	110	(0)
- * Club domestic league appearances and goals as of 1 November 2026

Mikhail Nikolayevich Petrolay (Russian: Михаил Николаевич Петролай; born 19 August 1994) is a Russian football defender who plays for FC Dynamo Vologda

== Club career ==
He made his debut in the Russian Second Division for FC Rubin-2 Kazan on 18 April 2012 in a game against FC Volga Ulyanovsk.

He made his Russian Football National League debut for FC Neftekhimik Nizhnekamsk on 8 March 2017 in a game against FC Zenit-2 Saint Petersburg.
