= Saša Kolunija =

Bosnian Serb footballer

Personal information
- Full name: Saša Kolunija
- Date of birth: 9 June 1987 (age 39)
- Place of birth: Travnik, SFR Yugoslavia
- Height: 1.94 m (6 ft 4 1/2 in)
- Position: Centre-back

Senior career*
Years	Team	Apps	(Gls)
2005–2007	Bežanija	27	(0)
2007–2008	Voždovac	5	(0)
2008–2009	Radnički Beograd	17	(0)
2009–2012	PAS Hamedan	57	(0)
2012–2013	Gahar Zagros	21	(0)
2013	Saipa	0	(0)
2014	Rad	6	(0)
2014–2015	Bežanija	28	(1)
2015–2016	Zemun	5	(0)
2016	Akzhayik	20	(0)
2016–2017	DSK Shivajians	12	(0)
2017–2018	Bežanija	8	(0)
2018–2019	Caspiy		
2020	Borac Sakule		
2021	Zvezdara		
- * Club domestic league appearances and goals as of 10 February 2017

Saša Kolunija (Serbian Cyrillic: Саша Колунија; born 9 June 1987) is a Bosnian Serb retired football player.

== Career ==
Kolunija was born in Travnik and played with Serbian clubs FK Bežanija, FK Voždovac and FK Radnički Beograd between 2005 and 2009. After spending three seasons at Pas Hamedan F.C., Kolunija joined Gahar Zagros F.C., in July 2012.

In January 2016, Kolunija signed for FC Akzhayik in the Kazakhstan Premier League. In November 2016, Kolunija signed for DSK Shivajians in the Indian I-League.
