= Sandro Tsveiba =

Footballer (born 1993)

Personal information
- Full name: Sandro Akhrikovich Tsveiba
- Date of birth: 5 September 1993 (age 33)
- Place of birth: Kyiv, Ukraine
- Height: 1.83 m (6 ft 0 in)
- Positions: Midfielder; centre-back

Youth career
- 1998–1999: Dynamo Moscow
- 1999–2000: Spartak Moscow
- 2000–2013: Lokomotiv Moscow

Senior career*
| Years | Team | Apps | (Gls) |
| 2013 | Rus Saint Petersburg | 20 | (4) |
| 2014 | SKA-Energiya Khabarovsk | 3 | (0) |
| 2014–2015 | Újpest | 2 | (0) |
| 2015 | Osijek | 1 | (0) |
| 2016 | Aktobe | 28 | (1) |
| 2017 | Krylia Sovetov Samara | 0 | (0) |
| 2017–2018 | Dynamo St. Petersburg | 31 | (2) |
| 2018–2019 | Fakel Voronezh | 33 | (2) |
| 2019 | AFC Eskilstuna | 12 | (0) |
| 2020 | Isloch Minsk Raion | 17 | (0) |

International career
| 2010 | Russia U17 | 6 | (0) |
| 2014 | Russia U21 | 5 | (1) |
- * Club domestic league appearances and goals

Sandro Akhrikovich Tsveiba (Russian: Сандро Ахрикович Цвейба; Abkhaz: Сандро Аҳрик-иҧа Цәеиба; born 5 September 1993) is a former professional footballer who played as a midfielder or centre-back. Born in Ukraine, he represented Russia internationally at youth levels. He is a son of former international Akhrik Tsveiba.

== Career ==
Tsveiba spent 13 seasons in the youth ranks of FC Lokomotiv Moscow, amassing 59 matches and 5 goals between 2011 and 2013 for the "double"/youth team. Not breaking into the club's first team, he left the club and made his debut in the third-tier Russian Second Division for Rus Saint Petersburg on 15 July 2013 in a game against Spartak Kostroma. After half a season there, he moved again, to the second-tier SKA-Energiya Khabarovsk, playing only three matches in the season.

In the summer of 2014, he moved abroad, to the Hungarian side Újpest FC. Despite making the first-team squad in 22 league matches, he only entered the game twice, for a total of seven minutes in play. his only full match for Újpest was in a cup game against FC Ajka, where he made an assist.

In the summer of 2015, he moved abroad again, signing for the Croatian side NK Osijek.

On 17 February 2017, he signed with Russian Premier League club Krylia Sovetov Samara. On 24 June 2017, he signed with Dynamo Saint Petersburg.

On 19 July 2019, he signed with Swedish club AFC Eskilstuna until the end of 2019.
