= Yegor Azovsky =

Kazakhstani footballer

Personal information
- Full name: Yegor Ivanovich Azovsky
- Date of birth: 10 January 1985 (age 41)
- Place of birth: Astana, Kazakh SSR
- Height: 1.86 m (6 ft 1 in)
- Position: Defender

Senior career*
Years	Team	Apps	(Gls)
2002	Zhenis Astana	3	(0)
2003	Batyr Ekibastuz	2	(0)
2003	Ekibastuzets	25	(0)
2004	Evraziya Astana	1	(0)
2004	Zhenis Astana	17	(0)
2005	Alma-Ata	22	(0)
2006	Astana	25	(0)
2007	Ordabasy	29	(0)
2008	Astana	24	(2)
2009	Zhetysu	24	(1)
2010–2011	Kaisar	55	(3)
2012	Atyrau	14	(0)
2013	Kaisar	27	(2)
2014–2015	Okzhetpes	43	(1)
2016	Aktobe	17	(0)

International career
2005–2008	Kazakhstan	21	(0)
- * Club domestic league appearances and goals

Yegor Ivanovich Azovsky (Russian: Егор Иванович Азовский; born 10 January 1985) is a Kazakh former professional football player who played as a defender.

Azovsky has made a total of 21 appearances for Kazakhstan.

== Personal life ==
His brother, Maksim, is also a professional footballer, currently for FC Zhetysu.

== Career statistics ==
=== International ===
Kazakhstan
Year	Apps	Goals
2005	1	0
2006	10	0
2007	6	0
2008	4	0
Total	21	0

Statistics accurate as of match played 10 September 2008
