= 2017 FC Okzhetpes season =

FC Okzhetpes
2017 season
- Chairman: Saparbek Kakishev
- Manager: Vladimir Mukhanov (Until 17 May); Viktor Semenov (Caretaker) (17-25 May); Viktor Pasulko (From 25 May)
- Stadium: Okzhetpes Stadium
- Kazakhstan Premier League: 12th
- Kazakhstan Cup: Quarter-final vs Shakhter Karagandy
- Top goalscorer: League: Two Players (4); All: Three Players (4)
Home colours

The 2017 FC Okzhetpes season is the 3rd successive season, and 20th in total, that the club playing in the Kazakhstan Premier League, the highest tier of association football in Kazakhstan. Okzhetpes will also participate in the Kazakhstan Cup.

On 17 May, Vladimir Mukhanov resigned as manager, with Viktor Semenov taking temporary charge, until Viktor Pasulko was appointed as the club's new manager on 25 May.

== Squad ==
As of 15 August 2017

Note: Flags indicate national team as defined under FIFA eligibility rules; some limited exceptions apply. Players may hold more than one non-FIFA nationality.

No.	Pos.	Nation	Player
1	GK	SRB	Saša Stamenković
2	DF	LTU	Georgas Freidgeimas
3	DF	KAZ	Nurlan Dairov
4	DF	KAZ	Rinat Abdulin
6	DF	KAZ	Sergey Keyler
9	MF	RUS	Vitali Volkov
10	FW	RUS	Aleksandr Kozlov
11	DF	KAZ	Anton Kuksin
12	MF	GEO	Gogita Gogua
14	MF	KAZ	Igor Yurin
17	MF	KAZ	Oleg Nedashkovsky
18	DF	KAZ	Daniel Choi
21	MF	SLO	Lucas Horvat

No.	Pos.	Nation	Player
23	MF	KAZ	Timur Dosmagambetov
25	DF	KAZ	Aleksandr Marochkin
28	GK	KAZ	Ruslan Abzhanov
30	DF	RUS	Matvei Matveyev
32	FW	KAZ	Alibek Buleshev
40	GK	KAZ	Mikhail Golubnichy
74	DF	KAZ	Sultan Abilgazy
75	GK	KAZ	Vladislav Frolov
77	DF	KAZ	Talgat Adyrbekov (loan from Ordabasy)
88	FW	KAZ	Sergei Shaff
95	DF	KAZ	Oleg Lebedev
96	MF	KAZ	Maxim Fedin
99	MF	UKR	Vitaliy Hoshkoderya

== Transfers ==
=== Winter ===
In: Note: Flags indicate national team as defined under FIFA eligibility rules; some limited exceptions apply. Players may hold more than one non-FIFA nationality.

No.	Pos.	Nation	Player
3	DF	KAZ	Nurlan Dairov (from (Kazakhstan) Kairat)
6	DF	KAZ	Sergey Keyler (from (Kazakhstan) Kaisar)
7	MF	KAZ	Yerkebulan Nurgaliyev (from (Kazakhstan) Altai Semey)
10	FW	RUS	Aleksandr Kozlov (from (Russia) Fakel Voronezh)
17	MF	KAZ	Oleg Nedashkovsky
18	MF	KAZ	Daniel Choi (from (Kazakhstan) Tobol)
19	MF	KAZ	Demiyat Slambekov (from (Kazakhstan) Bayterek)
20	DF	KAZ	Berik Shaikhov (loan from (Kazakhstan) Astana)
21	MF	SLO	Lucas Horvat (from (Slovenia) Domžale)
22	MF	KAZ	Alibek Ayaganov (from (Kazakhstan) Irtysh Pavlodar)
23	MF	KAZ	Timur Dosmagambetov (from (Kazakhstan) Tobol)
25	DF	KAZ	Aleksandr Marochkin (from (Kazakhstan) Kaisar)
27	FW	RUS	Sergei Strukov (from (Kazakhstan) Kyzylzhar)
33	FW	BUL	Tsvetan Genkov (from (Bulgaria) Lokomotiv GO)
40	GK	KAZ	Mikhail Golubnichy (from (Kazakhstan) Astana)
88	FW	KAZ	Sergei Shaff (from (Kazakhstan) Altai Semey)
89	MF	UKR	Serhiy Politylo (from (Ukraine) Dnipro Dnipropetrovsk)
96	FW	KAZ	Maxim Fedin (from (Kazakhstan) Atyrau)

Out: Note: Flags indicate national team as defined under FIFA eligibility rules; some limited exceptions apply. Players may hold more than one non-FIFA nationality.

No.	Pos.	Nation	Player
5	MF	KAZ	Anatoli Bogdanov
6	DF	KAZ	Ilnur Mangutkin (to (Kazakhstan) Shakhter Karagandy)
7	FW	KAZ	Sanat Zhumahanov (to (Kazakhstan) Ordabasy)
17	FW	KAZ	Zhasulan Moldakaraev (to (Kazakhstan) Tobol)
18	MF	SRB	Risto Ristović (to (Serbia) Zemun)
21	MF	KAZ	Zhakyp Kozhamberdi (to (Kazakhstan) Taraz)
23	DF	KAZ	Miras Tuliyev
24	GK	KAZ	Dzhurakhon Babakhanov (to (Kazakhstan) Taraz)
32	FW	CHI	Nicolás Canales (to (Chile) Deportes Temuco)
36	DF	KAZ	Oleg Lebedev
53	DF	KAZ	Viktor Zyabko
77	DF	UKR	Oleksandr Chyzhov (to (Ukraine) Vorskla Poltava)
88	FW	CMR	Serge Bando N'Gambé (to (Kazakhstan) Irtysh Pavlodar)

=== Summer ===
In: Note: Flags indicate national team as defined under FIFA eligibility rules; some limited exceptions apply. Players may hold more than one non-FIFA nationality.

No.	Pos.	Nation	Player
2	DF	LTU	Georgas Freidgeimas (from (Lithuania) Žalgiris)
4	DF	KAZ	Rinat Abdulin (from (Kazakhstan) Ordabasy)
12	MF	GEO	Gogita Gogua (from (Kazakhstan) Ordabasy)
30	DF	RUS	Matvei Matveyev (from (Russia) Volga Tver)
31	FW	BEL	Marvin Ogunjimi (from (Albania) Skënderbeu Korçë)
32	FW	KAZ	Alibek Buleshev (from (Kazakhstan) Ordabasy)
75	GK	KAZ	Vladislav Frolov
77	DF	KAZ	Talgat Adyrbekov (loan from (Kazakhstan) Ordabasy)
95	DF	KAZ	Oleg Lebedev
99	MF	UKR	Vitaliy Hoshkoderya (from (Ukraine) Olimpik Donetsk)

Out: Note: Flags indicate national team as defined under FIFA eligibility rules; some limited exceptions apply. Players may hold more than one non-FIFA nationality.

No.	Pos.	Nation	Player
5	MF	CMR	Joseph Nane (to (Kazakhstan) Aktobe)
7	MF	KAZ	Yerkebulan Nurgaliyev (to (Bulgaria) Vereya)
8	DF	RUS	Daniil Chertov
19	MF	KAZ	Demiyat Slambekov
20	DF	KAZ	Berik Shaikhov (loan return to (Kazakhstan) Astana)
22	MF	KAZ	Alibek Ayaganov (to (Kazakhstan) Akzhayik)
27	FW	RUS	Sergei Strukov
31	FW	BEL	Marvin Ogunjimi (to (Netherlands) MVV Maastricht)
33	FW	BUL	Tsvetan Genkov
89	MF	UKR	Serhiy Politylo (to (Ukraine) Chornomorets Odesa)

== Competitions ==
=== Kazakhstan Premier League ===
==== Results summary ====
Overall								Home						Away					
Pld	W	D	L	GF	GA	GD	Pts	W	D	L	GF	GA	GD	W	D	L	GF	GA	GD
33	7	3	23	27	59	−32	24	6	0	10	16	23	−7	1	3	13	11	36	−25

Last updated: 5 November 2017.
Source: See Results

==== Results by round ====
Round	1	2	3	4	5	6	7	8	9	10	11	12	13	14	15	16	17	18	19	20	21	22	23	24	25	26	27	28	29	30	31	32	33
Ground	A	A	H	A	H	A	H	H	H	A	H	A	H	A	H	A	H	A	A	H	A	H	A	H	A	A	H	A	H	A	A	H	A
Result	L	D	W	L	L	D	L	W	L	W	L	L	L	D	W	L	W	L	L	L	L	W	L	L	L	L	L	L	W	L	L	L	L
Position	9	11	6	9	10	8	10	8	8	8	8	9	10	10	8	10	8	9	9	9	10	10	10	11	12	12	12	12	12	12	12	12	12

Source: See Results
A = Away; H = Home; W = Win; D = Draw; L = Loss

==== Results ====
8 March 2017 1	Kaisar	1 – 0	Okzhetpes	Kyzylorda
15:00 (UTC+6)	I.Graf (yellow card) 57'; Nikolić 90+2' (pen.)	Report	N.Dairov (yellow card) 71'; Fedin (yellow card) 76'; S.Keyler (yellow card) 90+3'	Stadium: Gani Muratbayev Stadium; Attendance: 4,200; Referee: Marat Iskakov

12 March 2017 2	Kairat	2 – 2	Okzhetpes	Almaty
16:00 (UTC+6)	Marković 34' (yellow card) 90+1'; Akhmetov (yellow card) 45' (yellow-red card) 53'; Islamkhan (yellow card) 56'; Arshavin 83'; Suyumbayev (yellow card) 90+4'	Report	Kozlov 19' (yellow card) 58'; Chertov (yellow card) 35'; Volkov (yellow card) 81' (goal) 90+4' (pen.)	Stadium: Central Stadium; Attendance: 6,500; Referee: Aleksander Gauzer

18 March 2017 3	Okzhetpes	1 – 0	Tobol	Astana
14:00 (UTC+6)	Horvat 37'; Chertov (yellow card) 73'	Report	Moldakaraev (yellow card) 43'	Stadium: Astana Arena; Attendance: 2,300; Referee: Igor Aleshin

29 March 2017 4	Ordabasy	2 – 1	Okzhetpes	Shymkent
16:00 (UTC+6)	Kovalchuk (yellow card) 45+2'; Nusserbayev 57'; Nurgaliev (yellow card) 57'; Yordanov 68'; E.Tungyshbaev (yellow card) 83'	Report	A.Marochkin (yellow card) 26'; Fedin 45+1'; N.Dairov (yellow card) 56'; Chertov (yellow card) 85'; Yurin (yellow card) 90+2'	Stadium: Kazhymukan Munaitpasov Stadium; Attendance: 4,500; Referee: Aleksandr Aliyev

8 April 2017 5	Okzhetpes	0 – 2	Irtysh Pavlodar	Shchuchinsk
17:00 (UTC+6)	Fedin (yellow card) 5'; Genkov (yellow card) 54'	Report	Živković (yellow card) 27'; Fofana 57'; Kislitsyn 65'	Stadium: Zhaksy Stadium; Referee: Askhat Abdanbayev

12 April 2017 6	Akzhayik	1 – 1	Okzhetpes	Oral
18:00 (UTC+6)	A.Ersalimov (yellow card) 1'; Govedarica 90' (yellow card) 90+2'	Report	A.Marochkin 18'; S.Shaff (yellow card) 62'	Stadium: Petr Atoyan Stadium; Attendance: 2,000; Referee: Timur Kumashev

16 April 2017 7	Okzhetpes	0 – 3	Astana	Astana
16:00 (UTC+6)	Strukov (yellow card) 44'; Yurin (yellow card) 87'	Report	Muzhikov 61'; Grahovac 64' (pen.); Murtazayev 79'	Stadium: Tarlan Arena; Attendance: 900; Referee: Anatoli Vishnichenko

21 April 2017 8	Atyrau	–	Okzhetpes	Atyrau
(UTC+6)				Stadium: Munaishy Stadium

29 April 2017 9	Okzhetpes	2 – 1	Aktobe	Astana
17:00 (UTC+6)	S.Shaff 1'; Horvat (yellow card) 61'; Chertov (yellow card) 65'; Fedin (yellow card) 79'; N.Dairov (yellow card) 87'; Dosmagambetov 90+1'	Report	Chertov 11' (o.g.); Torres (yellow card) 27'; Zyankovich (yellow card) 30'	Stadium: Tarlan Arena; Attendance: 950; Referee: Aleksandr Gauzer

2 May 2017 10	Okzhetpes	0 – 2	Shakhter Karagandy	Astana
15:00 (UTC+6)	Fedin (yellow card) 68'	Report	Stojanović (yellow card) 6'; Stanojević (yellow card) 13'; A.Tattybaev 20', 71'; Szöke (yellow card) 29'	Stadium: Astana Arena; Attendance: 500; Referee: Viktor Antonov

6 May 2017 11	Taraz	0 – 1	Okzhetpes	Taraz
18:00 (UTC+6)	Ergashev (yellow card) 62'; Kurgulin (yellow card) 66'	Report	B.Shaikhov (yellow card) 8' (yellow-red card) 26'; Dosmagambetov 45+1'; Chertov (yellow card) 86'	Stadium: Central Stadium; Attendance: 3,000; Referee: Grigory Moskovchenko

14 May 2017 12	Okzhetpes	2 – 3	Kairat	Astana
14:00 (UTC+6)	Strukov 29', 68'; Fedin (yellow card) 44'	Report	Zhukov (yellow card) 42'; Arshavin 74'; Isael 75'; Turysbek 79'	Stadium: Astana Arena; Attendance: 500; Referee: Timur Kumashev

20 May 2017 13	Tobol	5 – 1	Okzhetpes	Kostanay
16:00 (UTC+6)	G.Sartakov 35'; Shchotkin 41', 90+6' (pen.); Mukhutdinov (yellow card) 58'; Despotović 60'; Malyi (red card) 72'; R.Jalilov 90+2'	Report	O.Nedashkovsky (yellow card) 24'; A.Kuksin (yellow card) 34' (red card) 90+5'; Strukov (yellow card) 47'; Dosmagambetov (yellow card) 86'; Horvat 90+1'	Stadium: Stadion Zatobolets; Attendance: 2,000; Referee: Denis Izmailov

28 May 2017 14	Okzhetpes	1 – 2	Ordabasy	Astana
14:00 (UTC+6)	O.Nedashkovsky (yellow card) 18'; A.Marochkin (yellow card) 60'; Horvat (yellow card) 88'; Genkov 89'	Report	Nusserbayev 20'; Bocharov (yellow card) 27'; E.Tungyshbaev 38'; Gogua (yellow card) 71'	Stadium: Astana Arena; Attendance: 700; Referee: Denis Tevyashov

3 June 2017 15	Irtysh Pavlodar	0 – 0	Okzhetpes	Pavlodar
19:00 (UTC+6)	Živković (yellow card) 87'	Report	O.Nedashkovsky (yellow card) 62'; Stamenković (yellow card) 90+4'	Stadium: Central Stadium; Attendance: 3,200; Referee: Georgiy Chekhovskiy

18 June 2017 16	Okzhetpes	2 – 1	Akzhayik	Astana
17:00 (UTC+6)	Fedin (yellow card) 10'; A.Marochkin 29'; Kozlov 36'; A.Kuksin (yellow card) 55'; O.Nedashkovsky (yellow card) 76' (yellow-red card) 83'; Stamenković (yellow card) 90+1'	Report	Govedarica (yellow card) 32'; Y.Pertsukh (yellow card) 43'; Azuka 57' (pen.)	Stadium: Tarlan Arena; Attendance: 50; Referee: Furkat Atajanov

25 June 2017 17	Astana	3 – 0	Okzhetpes	Astana
18:00 (UTC+6)	Twumasi 39'; Grahovac 77'; Kabananga 78'	Report	Buleshev (yellow card) 84'	Stadium: Tarlan Arena; Attendance: 1,000; Referee: Artyom Kuchin

1 July 2017 18	Okzhetpes	1 – 0	Atyrau	Shchuchinsk
18:00 (UTC+6)	Kozlov 55'; O.Nedashkovsky (yellow card) 85'	Report	D.Mazhitov (yellow card) 6'	Stadium: Zhaksy Stadium; Attendance: 300; Referee: Bagdat Abdullaev

8 July 2017 19	Aktobe	3 – 0	Okzhetpes	Aktobe
19:00 (UTC+6)	Savić 14', 38' (yellow card) 80'; Zyankovich (yellow card) 18'; S.Zhumagali (yellow card) 58'; B.Baitana 87'	Report	Freidgeimas (yellow card) 36'; T.Adyrbekov (yellow card) 64'; Abdulin (yellow card) 69'; Dosmagambetov (yellow card) 75'	Stadium: Central Stadium; Attendance: 8,500; Referee: Aleksandr Aliyev

15 July 2017 20	Shakhter Karagandy	1 – 0	Okzhetpes	Karaganda
18:00 (UTC+6)	Szöke 13'; I.Pikalkin (yellow card) 45'; Stojanović (yellow card) 60'; M.Gabyshev (yellow card) 87'; Shakhmetov (yellow card) 90+3'	Report		Stadium: Shakhter Stadium; Attendance: 1,000; Referee: Igor Chesnokov

22 July 2017 21	Okzhetpes	0 – 1	Taraz	Shchuchinsk
18:00 (UTC+6)	Dosmagambetov (yellow card) 30'; T.Adyrbekov (yellow card) 38'	Report	Mané 45+1'	Stadium: Zhaksy Stadium; Attendance: 500; Referee: Aleksei Bobrov

26 July 2017 8	Atyrau	2 – 1	Okzhetpes	Atyrau
20:00 (UTC+6)	Khairullin 12'; Chichulin (yellow card) 37'; Lobjanidze (yellow card) 64'; E.Abdrakhmanov 77'; Maksimović (yellow card) 88'	Report	Horvat (yellow card) 35'; Gogua (yellow card) 37'; Freidgeimas (yellow card) 49'; T.Adyrbekov (yellow card) 61'; Buleshev 80'; Yurin (yellow card) 84'	Stadium: Munaishy Stadium; Attendance: 3,000; Referee: Georgiy Chekhovskiy

30 July 2017 22	Okzhetpes	3 – 1	Kaisar	Shchuchinsk
18:00 (UTC+6)	A.Marochkin 15'; Volkov 30'; Abdulin (yellow card) 42'; Kozlov 81'; Hoshkoderya (yellow card) 88'	Report	Zhangylyshbay (yellow card) 32'; Coureur 68'; Baizhanov (yellow card) 88' (yellow-red card) 90'	Stadium: Zhaksy Stadium; Attendance: 300; Referee: Bolat Karlibayev

13 August 2017 23	Okzhetpes	0 – 1	Kairat	Shchuchinsk
17:00 (UTC+6)	N.Dairov (yellow card) 53'; Abdulin (yellow card) 59'	Report	Gohou 33'; Kuat (yellow card) 55'; Arzo (yellow card) 63'	Stadium: Zhaksy Stadium; Attendance: 250; Referee: Bagdat Abdullaev

19 August 2017 24	Astana	–	Okzhetpes	Astana
(UTC+6)				Stadium: Astana Arena

26 August 2017 25	Okzhetpes	0 – 2	Aktobe	Shchuchinsk
16:00 (UTC+6)		Report	Kolčák (yellow card) 5'; Zyankovich 25'; Savić 34' (yellow card) 44'; B.Kairov (yellow card) 43'; Simović (yellow card) 60'	Stadium: Zhaksy Stadium; Attendance: 250; Referee: Timur Kumashev

9 September 2017 26	Akzhayik	2 – 0	Okzhetpes	Oral
18:00 (UTC+6)	A.Shabaev (yellow card) 32'; Đurović (yellow card) 39'; Dudchenko 42'; Glavina 45'	Report	Gogua (yellow card) 6'; N.Dairov (yellow card) 39'	Stadium: Petr Atoyan Stadium; Attendance: 2,000; Referee: Denis Izmailov

17 September 2017 27	Shakhter Karagandy	2 – 1	Okzhetpes	Karaganda
18:00 (UTC+6)	Stojanović 36' (pen.); Chleboun (yellow card) 69' (goal) 76'; M.Gabyshev (yellow card) 80'	Report	Abdulin (yellow card) 22' (yellow-red card) 34'; Buleshev 86' (pen.)	Stadium: Shakhter Stadium; Attendance: 2,00; Referee: Bolat Saryev

24 September 2017 28	Okzhetpes	1 – 2	Atyrau	Shchuchinsk
15:30 (UTC+6)	Freidgeimas 45'; Buleshev (yellow card) 60'	Report	Sikimić 15'; Ablitarov 53'; A.Pasechenko (yellow card) 90+2'	Stadium: Zhaksy Stadium; Attendance: 200; Referee: Marat Iskakov

30 September 2017 29	Kaisar	2 – 1	Okzhetpes	Kyzylorda
16:00 (UTC+6)	Muldarov 38'; Zhangylyshbay 87'	Report	Volkov (yellow card) 5'; I.Amirseitov 13' (o.g.); Gogua (yellow card) 35'; Hoshkoderya (yellow card) 60'	Stadium: Gani Muratbayev Stadium; Attendance: 2,000; Referee: Aleksei Bobrov

15 October 2017 30	Okzhetpes	2 – 1	Taraz	Kokshetau
15:00 (UTC+6)	Fedin 1'; T.Adyrbekov (yellow card) 25'; Abdulin 26' (yellow card) 77'; Buleshev (yellow card) 85'	Report	Maurice (yellow card) 5'; Mané 25' (pen.) (yellow card) 85'; Ergashev (yellow card) 36'; Feshchuk (yellow card) 72'	Stadium: Okzhetpes Stadium; Attendance: 3,000; Referee: Denis Tevyashov

22 October 2017 31	Tobol	4 – 1	Okzhetpes	Kostanay
16:00 (UTC+6)	Moldakaraev 1'; Vůch 15', 32', 74'	Report	Dosmagambetov (yellow card) 70'; O.Nedashkovsky 88'	Stadium: Central Stadium; Attendance: 7,000; Referee: Aydin Rakhimbayev

25 October 2017 24	Astana	4 – 0	Okzhetpes	Astana
19:00 (UTC+6)	Mayewski 10'; Kabananga 20'; Twumasi 61'; Shitov (yellow card) 64'; Abdulin 80' (o.g.)	Report		Stadium: Astana Arena; Attendance: 500; Referee: Bolat Saryev

28 October 2017 32	Okzhetpes	1 – 2	Irtysh Pavlodar	Kokshetau
15:00 (UTC+6)	Dosmagambetov 27'; Yurin (yellow card) 67'	Report	António 5'; Stamenković 12'	Stadium: Okzhetpes Stadium; Attendance: 2,000; Referee: Georgiy Chekhovskiy

5 November 2017 33	Ordabasy	3 – 2	Okzhetpes	Shymkent
15:00 (UTC+6)	Yordanov 51', 80', 87'; B.Kozhabayev (yellow card) 63'; A.Bekbaev (yellow card) 74'; Mukhtarov (yellow card) 82'	Report	Dosmagambetov 40' (yellow card) 63'; O.Nedashkovsky 56'; T.Adyrbekov (yellow card) 78'; N.Dairov (yellow card) 90+1'	Stadium: Kazhymukan Munaitpasov Stadium; Attendance: 4,000; Referee: Saken Bayimbet

==== League table ====
Pos	Team	Pld	W	D	L	GF	GA	GD	Pts	Qualification or relegation
8	Atyrau (Note: Atyrau started the season with –9 points as a punishment for unpaid debts to former manager Zoran Filipović. On 24 April 2017, Atyrau had six points returned to after they cleared their debt to Filipović, with three points retained due to debts to Jonathas.)	33	10	8	15	34	54	−20	35	
9	Aktobe	33	8	9	16	38	46	−8	33	
10	Akzhayik (O)	33	7	9	17	29	47	−18	30	Qualification for the relegation play-offs
11	Taraz (Note: Taraz had six points deducted as a punishment for unpaid debts to former player Obiora Odita.) (R)	33	8	8	17	29	50	−21	26	Relegation to the Kazakhstan First Division
12	Okzhetpes (R)	33	7	3	23	28	61	−33	24	Relegation to the Kazakhstan First Division

Source: UEFA, Soccerway
Rules for classification: 1) Points; 2) Head-to-head points; 3) Head-to-head matches won; 4) Head-to-head goal difference; 5) Head-to-head goals scored; 6) Head-to-head away goals scored; 7) Goal difference; 8) Matches won; 9) Goals scored; 10) Away goals scored; 11) Draw.
(O) Play-off winners; (R) Relegated

=== Kazakhstan Cup ===
19 April 2017 Last 16	Makhtaaral	1 – 4	Okzhetpes	Atakent
15:00 (UTC+6)	D.Zverev (yellow card) 20'; E.Oralbay (yellow card) 40'; E.Nabiev 59'; A.Makhambetov (yellow card) 80'; R.Saurambaev (yellow card) 80'; K.Shubaev (yellow card) 90+1'	Report	A.Marochkin 14'; Fedin 21' (pen.); Yurin 26'; Chertov 43'; Genkov (yellow card) 80'	Stadium: Stadion Alpamis Batyr; Attendance: 1,500; Referee: Ruslan Omarov

10 May 2017 Quarter-final	Okzhetpes	1 – 2	Shakhter Karagandy	Astana
17:00 (UTC+6)	Chertov (yellow card) 47'; S.Shaff 74'; Kozlov (yellow card) 90+4'	Report	Kadio 51'; Stanojević 54'; R.Khairullin (yellow card) 68'; Aiyegbusi (yellow card) 90+5'	Stadium: Astana Arena; Attendance: 700

== Squad statistics ==
As of Match played 5 November 2017

=== Appearances and goals ===
No.	Pos	Nat	Player	Total		Premier League		Kazakhstan Cup	
No.	Pos	Nat	Player	Apps	Goals	Apps	Goals	Apps	Goals
1	GK	(Serbia) SRB	Saša Stamenković	27	0	26	0	1	0
2	DF	(Lithuania) LTU	Georgas Freidgeimas	13	1	13	1	0	0
3	DF	(Kazakhstan) KAZ	Nurlan Dairov	16	0	10+5	0	1	0
4	DF	(Kazakhstan) KAZ	Rinat Abdulin	17	1	17	1	0	0
6	DF	(Kazakhstan) KAZ	Sergey Keyler	6	0	2+3	0	1	0
9	MF	(Russia) RUS	Vitali Volkov	27	2	23+3	2	1	0
10	FW	(Russia) RUS	Aleksandr Kozlov	29	4	20+8	4	0+1	0
11	DF	(Kazakhstan) KAZ	Anton Kuksin	13	0	7+5	0	1	0
12	MF	(Georgia (country)) GEO	Gogita Gogua	16	0	7+9	0	0	0
14	MF	(Kazakhstan) KAZ	Igor Yurin	31	1	24+5	0	2	1
17	MF	(Kazakhstan) KAZ	Oleg Nedashkovsky	15	2	7+8	2	0	0
18	DF	(Kazakhstan) KAZ	Daniel Choi	1	0	0+1	0	0	0
21	MF	(Slovenia) SLO	Lucas Horvat	28	2	25+2	2	1	0
23	MF	(Kazakhstan) KAZ	Timur Dosmagambetov	31	4	25+5	4	1	0
25	DF	(Kazakhstan) KAZ	Aleksandr Marochkin	31	4	27+2	3	2	1
28	GK	(Kazakhstan) KAZ	Ruslan Abzhanov	4	0	4	0	0	0
30	DF	(Russia) RUS	Matvei Matveyev	2	0	1+1	0	0	0
32	FW	(Kazakhstan) KAZ	Alibek Buleshev	14	2	9+5	2	0	0
40	GK	(Kazakhstan) KAZ	Mikhail Golubnichy	4	0	3	0	1	0
74	DF	(Kazakhstan) KAZ	Sultan Abilgazy	1	0	0+1	0	0	0
77	DF	(Kazakhstan) KAZ	Talgat Adyrbekov	15	0	13+2	0	0	0
88	FW	(Kazakhstan) KAZ	Sergei Shaff	27	2	14+11	1	2	1
96	MF	(Kazakhstan) KAZ	Maxim Fedin	28	3	23+3	2	2	1
99	MF	(Ukraine) UKR	Vitaliy Hoshkoderya	14	0	14	0	0	0
Players away from Okzhetpes on loan:
Players who left Okzhetpes during the season:
5	MF	(Cameroon) CMR	Joseph Nane	10	0	9	0	0+1	0
7	MF	(Kazakhstan) KAZ	Yerkebulan Nurgaliyev	1	0	0+1	0	0	0
8	DF	(Russia) RUS	Daniil Chertov	12	1	10	0	2	1
19	MF	(Kazakhstan) KAZ	Demiyat Slambekov	2	0	0+1	0	0+1	0
20	DF	(Kazakhstan) KAZ	Berik Shaikhov	2	0	1	0	0+1	0
27	FW	(Russia) RUS	Sergei Strukov	12	2	10	2	2	0
31	FW	(Belgium) BEL	Marvin Ogunjimi	7	0	5+2	0	0	0
33	FW	(Bulgaria) BUL	Tsvetan Genkov	13	1	3+9	1	0+1	0
89	MF	(Ukraine) UKR	Serhiy Politylo	14	0	12	0	2	0

=== Goal scorers ===
Place	Position	Nation	Number	Name	Premier League	Kazakhstan Cup	Total
1	FW	(Russia)	10	Aleksandr Kozlov	4	0	4
1	MF	(Kazakhstan)	23	Timur Dosmagambetov	4	0	4
1	MF	(Kazakhstan)	25	Aleksandr Marochkin	3	1	4
4	MF	(Kazakhstan)	96	Maxim Fedin	2	1	3
5	FW	(Russia)	27	Sergei Strukov	2	0	2
5	MF	(Slovenia)	21	Lucas Horvat	2	0	2
5	MF	(Russia)	9	Vitali Volkov	2	0	2
5	FW	(Kazakhstan)	32	Alibek Buleshev	2	0	2
5	MF	(Kazakhstan)	17	Oleg Nedashkovsky	2	0	2
5	FW	(Kazakhstan)	88	Sergei Shaff	1	1	2
11	FW	(Bulgaria)	33	Tsvetan Genkov	1	0	1
11	DF	(Lithuania)	2	Georgas Freidgeimas	1	0	1
11	DF	(Kazakhstan)	4	Rinat Abdulin	1	0	1
11	DF	(Russia)	8	Daniil Chertov	0	1	1
11	MF	(Kazakhstan)	14	Igor Yurin	0	1	1
11				Own goal	1	0	1
				TOTALS	28	5	33

=== Disciplinary record ===
Number	Nation	Position	Name	Premier League		Kazakhstan Cup		Total	
Number	Nation	Position	Name	Yellow card	Red card	Yellow card	Red card	Yellow card	Red card
1	(Serbia)	GK	Saša Stamenković	2	0	0	0	2	0
2	(Lithuania)	DF	Georgas Freidgeimas	3	0	0	0	3	0
3	(Kazakhstan)	DF	Nurlan Dairov	6	0	0	0	6	0
4	(Kazakhstan)	DF	Rinat Abdulin	7	1	0	0	7	1
6	(Kazakhstan)	DF	Sergey Keyler	1	0	0	0	1	0
8	(Russia)	DF	Daniil Chertov|5	0	1	0	6	0	
9	(Russia)	MF	Vitali Volkov	2	0	0	0	2	0
10	(Russia)	FW	Aleksandr Kozlov	1	0	1	0	2	0
11	(Kazakhstan)	DF	Anton Kuksin	2	1	0	0	2	1
12	(Georgia (country))	MF	Gogita Gogua	3	0	0	0	3	0
14	(Kazakhstan)	MF	Igor Yurin	4	0	0	0	4	0
17	(Kazakhstan)	MF	Oleg Nedashkovsky	6	1	0	0	6	1
20	(Kazakhstan)	DF	Berik Shaikhov	2	1	0	0	2	1
21	(Slovenia)	MF	Lucas Horvat	3	0	0	0	3	0
23	(Kazakhstan)	MF	Timur Dosmagambetov	6	0	0	0	6	0
25	(Kazakhstan)	DF	Aleksandr Marochkin	2	0	0	0	2	0
27	(Russia)	FW	Sergei Strukov	2	0	0	0	2	0
28	(Kazakhstan)	FW	Alibek Buleshev	3	0	0	0	3	0
33	(Bulgaria)	FW	Tsvetan Genkov	1	0	1	0	2	0
77	(Kazakhstan)	DF	Talgat Adyrbekov	5	0	0	0	5	0
88	(Kazakhstan)	FW	Sergei Shaff	1	0	0	0	1	0
96	(Kazakhstan)	MF	Maxim Fedin	6	0	0	0	6	0
99	(Ukraine)	MF	Vitaliy Hoshkoderya	2	0	0	0	2	0
			TOTALS	75	4	3	0	78	4
