= 2017 FC Ordabasy season =

FC Ordabasy
2017 season
- Chairman: Sagat Yensegenuly
- Manager: Aleksei Petrushin
- Stadium: Kazhymukan Munaitpasov Stadium
- Premier League: 3rd
- Kazakhstan Cup: Semifinal vs Kairat
- Europa League: First Qualifying Round vs Široki Brijeg
- Top goalscorer: League: Tanat Nusserbayev (9); All: Tanat Nusserbayev (9)
Home colours	Away colours

The 2017 FC Ordabasy season is their 15th season in the Kazakhstan Premier League, the highest tier of association football in Kazakhstan, following their promotion from to the Kazakhstan First Division in 2003. Ordabasy will also play in the UEFA Europa League and Kazakhstan Cup.

== Season events ==
On 5 February, Aleksei Petrushin was appointed as the club's new manager, taking over from Bakhtiyar Bayseitov.

== Squad ==
As of 21 July 2017

Note: Flags indicate national team as defined under FIFA eligibility rules; some limited exceptions apply. Players may hold more than one non-FIFA nationality.

No.	Pos.	Nation	Player
1	GK	KAZ	Almat Bekbaev
2	DF	KAZ	Baudaulet Kozhabayev
4	DF	KAZ	Mukhtar Mukhtarov
6	DF	KAZ	Ular Zhaksybaev
7	FW	KAZ	Tanat Nusserbayev
8	MF	KAZ	Samat Smakov
9	MF	KAZ	Vitali Li
10	MF	KAZ	Kairat Ashirbekov
11	MF	UKR	Kyrylo Kovalchuk
13	MF	KAZ	Azat Nurgaliev
14	DF	ARG	Pablo Fontanello
17	MF	KAZ	Mardan Tolebek
18	MF	CRO	Oliver Petrak
20	DF	KAZ	Sagdat Tursynbay
21	MF	KAZ	Yerkebulan Tungyshbayev

No.	Pos.	Nation	Player
22	MF	SEN	Abdoulaye Diakate
23	GK	BLR	Valery Fomichev
25	GK	KAZ	Ramil Nurmukhametov
29	GK	KAZ	Sergey Boychenko
30	MF	KAZ	Sanat Zhumahanov
32	DF	KAZ	Temirlan Erlanov
33	FW	BUL	Preslav Yordanov
50	MF	UZB	Alexander Geynrikh
55	DF	KAZ	Farkhadbek Irismetov
69	MF	RUS	Nikita Bocharov
77	FW	SRB	Srđan Vujaklija
81	MF	COL	Roger Cañas
87	DF	SRB	Aleksandar Simčević
88	MF	KAZ	Bekzat Beisenov

=== On Loan ===
Note: Flags indicate national team as defined under FIFA eligibility rules; some limited exceptions apply. Players may hold more than one non-FIFA nationality.

No.	Pos.	Nation	Player
77	DF	KAZ	Talgat Adyrbekov (at Okzhetpes)

== Transfers ==
=== Winter ===
In: Note: Flags indicate national team as defined under FIFA eligibility rules; some limited exceptions apply. Players may hold more than one non-FIFA nationality.

No.	Pos.	Nation	Player
5	DF	SRB	Zoran Rendulić (from (Serbia) Red Star Belgrade)
7	FW	KAZ	Tanat Nusserbayev (from (Kazakhstan) Astana)
11	MF	UKR	Kyrylo Kovalchuk (from (Russia) Tom Tomsk)
13	MF	KAZ	Azat Nurgaliev (loan return from (Kazakhstan) Astana)
14	DF	ARG	Pablo Fontanello (from (Russia) Ural)
18	FW	BUL	Preslav Yordanov (from (Bulgaria) CSKA Sofia)
25	GK	KAZ	Ramil Nurmukhametov (from (Kazakhstan) Atyrau)
27	FW	KAZ	Alibek Buleshev (from (Kazakhstan) Okzhetpes)
30	MF	KAZ	Sanat Zhumahanov (from (Kazakhstan) Okzhetpes)
69	MF	RUS	Nikita Bocharov (from (Kazakhstan) Aktobe)

Out: Note: Flags indicate national team as defined under FIFA eligibility rules; some limited exceptions apply. Players may hold more than one non-FIFA nationality.

No.	Pos.	Nation	Player
6	MF	NGR	Dominic Chatto (to (Sweden) Falkenberg)
9	FW	MNE	Filip Kasalica (to (Serbia) Napredak Kruševac)
11	FW	KAZ	Dauren Kaykibasov
15	DF	SRB	Branislav Trajković
—	GK	KAZ	Samat Otarbayev (to (Kazakhstan) Aktobe, previously on loan)

=== Summer ===
In: Note: Flags indicate national team as defined under FIFA eligibility rules; some limited exceptions apply. Players may hold more than one non-FIFA nationality.

No.	Pos.	Nation	Player
9	MF	KAZ	Vitali Li (from (Kazakhstan) Atyrau)
18	MF	CRO	Oliver Petrak (from (Bosnia and Herzegovina) Zrinjski Mostar)
23	GK	BLR	Valery Fomichev (from (Belarus) Torpedo-BelAZ Zhodino)
77	FW	SRB	Srđan Vujaklija (from (Serbia) Red Star Belgrade)
81	MF	COL	Roger Cañas (from (Kazakhstan) Astana)

Out: Note: Flags indicate national team as defined under FIFA eligibility rules; some limited exceptions apply. Players may hold more than one non-FIFA nationality.

No.	Pos.	Nation	Player
5	DF	SRB	Zoran Rendulić (to (Serbia) Rad)
23	DF	KAZ	Rinat Abdulin (to (Kazakhstan) Okzhetpes)
27	FW	KAZ	Alibek Buleshev (to (Kazakhstan) Okzhetpes)
34	MF	GEO	Gogita Gogua (to (Kazakhstan) Okzhetpes)
77	DF	KAZ	Talgat Adyrbekov (loan to (Kazakhstan) Okzhetpes)
88	FW	GEO	Otar Martsvaladze (to (Georgia (country)) Dinamo Batumi)

== Competitions ==
=== Kazakhstan Premier League ===
==== Results summary ====
Overall								Home						Away					
Pld	W	D	L	GF	GA	GD	Pts	W	D	L	GF	GA	GD	W	D	L	GF	GA	GD
33	18	4	11	44	36	+8	58	12	1	4	30	15	+15	6	3	7	14	21	−7

Last updated: 5 November 2017.
Source: See Results

==== Results by round ====
Round	1	2	3	4	5	6	7	8	9	10	11	12	13	14	15	16	17	18	19	20	21	22	23	24	25	26	27	28	29	30	31	32	33
Ground	H	H	A	H	A	A	H	A	H	A	A	H	A	H	A	H	H	H	H	H	A	A	A	H	A	H	A	A	H	H	H	A	H
Result	W	D	W	W	L	L	W	L	L	W	W	W	D	W	W	L	W	W	L	W	W	L	L	W	D	W	D	L	L	W	W	L	W
Position	1	3	2	1	2	4	2	5	5	5	2	2	2	2	2	3	3	3	3	3	3	3	3	3	3	3	3	3	3	3	3	3	3

Source: See Results
A = Away; H = Home; W = Win; D = Draw; L = Loss

==== Results ====
8 March 2017 1	Ordabasy	3 – 0	Astana	Shymkent
14:00 (UTC+6)	M.Tolebek 15'; Tungyshbayev (yellow card) 29'; Nurgaliev 74'; Diakate 88'	Report	Muzhikov (yellow card) 22'; Erić (yellow card) 71'	Stadium: Kazhymukan Munaitpasov Stadium; Attendance: 7,000; Referee: Igor Aleshin

12 March 2017 2	Ordabasy	1 – 1	Atyrau	Shymkent
15:00 (UTC+6)	B.Kozhabayev (yellow card) 50'; Kovalchuk (yellow card) 80'; M.Tolebek (yellow card) 83' (goal) 90+4'	Report	Obšivač 83'	Stadium: Kazhymukan Munaitpasov Stadium; Attendance: 8,500; Referee: Bolat Karlibayev

18 March 2017 3	Aktobe	0 – 1	Ordabasy	Aktobe
16:00 (UTC+6)	Cassiano (yellow card) 10' (yellow-red card) 76'; R.Aslan (yellow card) 17'; Volovyk (yellow card) 90+3'	Report	Nusserbayev 7' (yellow card) 53'; B.Kozhabayev (yellow card) 20'; Diakate (yellow card) 80'; Nurgaliev (yellow card) 81'; Buleshev (yellow card) 90+2'	Stadium: Central Stadium; Attendance: 2,800; Referee: Artyom Kuchin

31 March 2017 4	Ordabasy	2 – 1	Okzhetpes	Shymkent
16:00 (UTC+6)	Kovalchuk (yellow card) 45+2'; Nusserbayev 57'; Nurgaliev (yellow card) 57'; Yordanov 68'; Tungyshbayev (yellow card) 83'	Report	Marochkin (yellow card) 26'; Fedin 45+1'; N.Dairov (yellow card) 56'; Chertov (yellow card) 85'; Yurin (yellow card) 90+2'	Stadium: Kazhymukan Munaitpasov Stadium; Attendance: 4,500; Referee: Aleksandr Aliyev

4 April 2017 18	Tobol	1 – 0	Ordabasy	Kostanay
16:30 (UTC+6)	Savić 18'; Kassaï (yellow card) 38'; D.Miroshnichenko (yellow card) 45+1'	Report	Rendulić (yellow card) 25'; Fontanello (yellow card) 45+1'	Stadium: Stadion Zatobolets; Attendance: 2,500; Referee: Denis Izmailov

8 April 2017 5	Taraz	2 – 1	Ordabasy	Taraz
16:00 (UTC+6)	Mukhametshin 16'; Kozhamberdi 31'; A.Moltusinov (yellow card) 87'	Report	M.Tolebek 30'	Stadium: Central Stadium; Attendance: 3,000; Referee: Marat Iskakov

12 April 2017 6	Ordabasy	1 – 0	Kaisar	Shymkent
15:00 (UTC+6)	Tungyshbayev (yellow card) 28'; Martsvaladze 51'	Report	Narzildaev (yellow card) 9'; D.Yevstigneyev (yellow card) 36'; Lamanje (yellow card) 39'; Korobkin (yellow card) 64'	Stadium: Kazhymukan Munaitpasov Stadium; Attendance: 4,000; Referee: Aleksandr Gauzer

16 April 2017 7	Kairat	3 – 0	Ordabasy	Almaty
18:00 (UTC+6)	Islamkhan 6'; Marković (yellow card) 40'; Gohou 43'; Iličević 70'; Kuat (yellow card) 75'	Report	Nusserbayev (yellow card) 55'; Nurgaliev (yellow card) 65'; Tungyshbayev (yellow card) 67'	Stadium: Central Stadium; Attendance: 15,000; Referee: Igor Aleshin

23 April 2017 8	Ordabasy	1 – 2	Tobol	Shymkent
16:00 (UTC+6)	Kovalchuk 45'; Erlanov (yellow card) 70'	Report	Zhangylyshbay (yellow card) 20' (goal) 63'; Dmitrenko (yellow card) 44'; Despotović 68'	Stadium: Kazhymukan Munaitpasov Stadium; Attendance: 4,500; Referee: Aleksei Bobrov

29 April 2017 9	Shakhter Karagandy	1 – 2	Ordabasy	Temirtau
16:00 (UTC+6)	A.Tattybaev (yellow card) 48'; Shakhmetov 56'; Stanojević (yellow card) 81'	Report	Kovalchuk 3', 37'; Erlanov (yellow card) 75'	Stadium: Metallurg Stadium; Attendance: 1,500; Referee: Aydin Rakhimbayev

2 May 2017 10	Irtysh Pavlodar	0 – 1	Ordabasy	Pavlodar
19:00 (UTC+6)	Živković (yellow card) 18'; Fonseca (yellow card) 45'; Vorotnikov (yellow card) 74'; Shabalin (yellow card) 89'	Report	Gogua (yellow card) 28'; Fontanello 75'; Erlanov (yellow card) 75'	Stadium: Central Stadium; Attendance: 4,500; Referee: Ashkat Abdanbayev

6 May 2017 11	Ordabasy	3 – 0	Akzhayik	Shymkent
16:00 (UTC+6)	Fontanello 2'; Erlanov 50'; Kovalchuk (yellow card) 60'; Nusserbayev 64'	Report	Y.Pertsukh (yellow card) 28'; Coronel (yellow card) 31'; Rubio (yellow card) 46'; Nikolić (yellow card) 63'	Stadium: Kazhymukan Munaitpasov Stadium; Attendance: 3,000; Referee: Igor Chesnokov

14 May 2017 12	Atyrau	2 – 2	Ordabasy	Atyrau
19:00 (UTC+6)	E.Abdrakhmanov 52' (yellow card) 55'; Salomov 59' (yellow card) 75'; A.Pasechenko (yellow card) 84'	Report	Nusserbayev 14' (yellow card) 84'; Tungyshbayev (yellow card) 37'; Kovalchuk (yellow card) 44'; Nurgaliev 85' (pen.); Erlanov (yellow card) 90+1'	Stadium: Munaishy Stadium; Attendance: 7,500; Referee: Anatolyi Vishnichenko

20 May 2017 13	Ordabasy	2 – 1	Aktobe	Shymkent
17:00 (UTC+6)	M.Tolebek (yellow card) 23' (yellow-red card) 74'; B.Beisenov (yellow card) 28'; Tungyshbayev 31'; Diakate (yellow card) 33'; Nusserbayev 39'	Report	B.Kairov (yellow card) 16' (yellow-red card) 54'; Júnior (yellow card) 45+1'; R.Aslan (yellow card) 67'; Mamute 90+2'	Stadium: Kazhymukan Munaitpasov Stadium; Attendance: 2,700; Referee: Aleksei Bobrov

28 May 2017 14	Okzhetpes	1 – 2	Ordabasy	Astana
14:00 (UTC+6)	O.Nedashkovsky (yellow card) 18'; Marochkin (yellow card) 60'; Horvat (yellow card) 88'; Genkov 89'	Report	Nusserbayev 20'; Bocharov (yellow card) 27'; Tungyshbayev 38'; Gogua (yellow card) 71'	Stadium: Astana Arena; Attendance: 700; Referee: Denis Tevyashov

31 May 2017 20	Ordabasy	0 – 1	Irtysh Pavlodar	Shymkent
18:00 (UTC+6)		Report	A.Darabayev 48' (yellow card) 53'; Shabalin (yellow card) 87'; Aliev (yellow card) 90'	Stadium: Kazhymukan Munaitpasov Stadium; Attendance: 3,500

3 June 2017 15	Ordabasy	3 – 0	Taraz	Shymkent
18:00 (UTC+6)	Tungyshbayev 5'; Nurgaliev 13'; Gogua 86'	Report	Kozhamberdi (yellow card) 35'; B.Shadmanov (yellow card) 56'	Stadium: Kazhymukan Munaitpasov Stadium; Attendance: 3,000; Referee: Timur Kumashev

17 June 2017 16	Kaisar	0 – 1	Ordabasy	Kyzylorda
19:00 (UTC+6)	Kamara (yellow card) 34'; D.Yevstigneyev (yellow card) 37'; Muldarov (yellow card) 68'; Lamanje (yellow card) 90'; Narzildaev (yellow card) 90+3'	Report	Kovalchuk (yellow card) 45+1'; Fontanello 58'	Stadium: Gani Muratbayev Stadium; Attendance: 1,600; Referee: Aydin Rakhimbayev

24 June 2017 17	Ordabasy	0 – 2	Kairat	Shymkent
19:00 (UTC+6)	Diakate (yellow card) 22'; S.Zhumahanov (yellow card) 51'; Tungyshbayev (yellow card) 55'	Report	Islamkhan (yellow card) 1'; Suyumbayev 7'; Gohou 18'; Kuat (yellow card) 32'; Arshavin (yellow card) 79'	Stadium: Kazhymukan Munaitpasov Stadium; Attendance: 4,500; Referee: Marat Iskakov

9 July 2017 18	Ordabasy	1 – 0	Shakhter Karagandy	Shymkent
19:00 (UTC+6)	Erlanov (yellow card) 50'; Vujaklija 74'	Report	Stojanović (yellow card) 25'; Khizhnichenko (yellow card) 72'	Stadium: Kazhymukan Munaitpasov Stadium; Attendance: 2,500; Referee: Aydin Rakhimbayev

22 July 2017 21	Akzhayik	1 – 2	Ordabasy	Oral
19:00 (UTC+6)	I.Antipov 40' (yellow card) 61'; Odibe (yellow card) 55'; Govedarica (yellow card) 88'; Dudchenko (yellow card) 90+4'	Report	Nusserbayev 27', 36'; Petrak (yellow card) 60'; Nurgaliev (yellow card) 68'; Erlanov (yellow card) 77'; Cañas (yellow card) 87'; Bekbaev (yellow card) 90+4'	Stadium: Petr Atoyan Stadium; Attendance: 2,000; Referee: Marat Iskakov

7 August 2017 22	Astana	1 – 0	Ordabasy	Astana
17:30 (UTC+6)	Beisebekov (yellow card) 56'; Grahovac (yellow card) 71'; Kleinheisler (yellow card) 87'; Tagybergen (yellow card) 90+3'	Report	B.Beisenov (yellow card) 4'; Erlanov (yellow card) 46'	Stadium: Astana Arena; Attendance: 4,000; Referee: Denis Izmailov

12 August 2017 23	Shakhter Karagandy	2 – 1	Ordabasy	Karaganda
17:00 (UTC+6)	M.Gabyshev 62' (yellow card) 73'; Stojanović (yellow card) 65'; Szöke 80'	Report	Simčević (yellow card) 45+1'; Nurgaliev 60'	Stadium: Shakhter Stadium; Attendance: 3,000; Referee: Grigory Moskovchenko

20 August 2017 24	Ordabasy	2 – 0	Atyrau	Shymkent
18:30 (UTC+6)	Tungyshbayev (yellow card) 29' (goal) 68'; Nusserbayev 86'	Report	Sikimić (yellow card) 5'; A.Nurybekov (yellow card) 45+2'; Maksimović (yellow card) 66'; Khairullin (yellow card) 77'	Stadium: Kazhymukan Munaitpasov Stadium; Attendance: 3,200; Referee: Aydin Rakhimbayev

26 August 2017 25	Kaisar	1 – 1	Ordabasy	Kyzylorda
18:00 (UTC+6)	V.Chureyev (yellow card) 54'; Bojović 65' (yellow card) 78'	Report	Diakate (yellow card) 65'; Simčević (yellow card) 72'; Smakov (yellow card) 77' (goal) 90+4'	Stadium: Gani Muratbayev Stadium; Attendance: 1,300; Referee: Georgiy Chekhovskiy

10 September 2017 26	Ordabasy	1 – 0	Taraz	Shymkent
19:00 (UTC+6)	Kovalchuk 41'; Smakov (yellow card) 51'; Nusserbayev (yellow card) 61'; Nurgaliev (yellow card) 69'	Report	Mané (yellow card) 26'; Diarra (yellow card) 36'; A.Taubay (yellow card) 75'; Kurgulin (yellow card) 80'	Stadium: Kazhymukan Munaitpasov Stadium; Attendance: 5,300; Referee: Igor Chesnokov

16 September 2017 27	Tobol	0 – 0	Ordabasy	Kostanay
18:00 (UTC+6)	Žulpa (yellow card) 37' (yellow-red card) 79'; Šikov (yellow card) 49'; D.Zhalmukan (yellow card) 65'	Report	Nusserbayev (yellow card) 44'	Stadium: Central Stadium; Attendance: 5,000; Referee: Ruslan Omarov

20 September 2017 30	Kairat	5 – 1	Ordabasy	Almaty
20:00 (UTC+6)	Gohou 7', 55'; A.Sokolenko (yellow card) 47' (yellow-red card) 84'; Arshavin 64'; M.Paragulgov 67'; Elek (yellow card) 88'; Anene 89'	Report	Petrak (yellow card) 31'; Nurgaliev 48'; Nusserbayev (yellow card) 58'	Stadium: Central Stadium; Attendance: 8,300; Referee: Aleksander Gauzer

24 September 2017 28	Ordabasy	1 – 2	Irtysh Pavlodar	Shymkent
19:00 (UTC+6)	Simčević (yellow card) 8' (yellow-red card) 73'; Nusserbayev (yellow card) 27'; Kovalchuk (yellow card) 40'; M.Tolebek (yellow card) 64'; Vujaklija 85'	Report	Fofana (yellow card) 27' (goal) 32', 49'; Stamenković (yellow card) 45+2'; António (yellow card) 54'; I.Kalinin (yellow card) 78'; Loria (yellow card) 90+1'	Stadium: Kazhymukan Munaitpasov Stadium; Attendance: 3,000; Referee: Artyom Kuchin

30 September 2017 29	Ordabasy	3 – 2	Akzhayik	Shymkent
16:00 (UTC+6)	M.Tolebek 38'; Vujaklija 50'; Mukhtarov (yellow card) 75'; Yordanov 90'	Report	A.Ersalimov (yellow card) 35'; Odibe (yellow card) 37' (goal) 45+1'; Glavina 73'	Stadium: Kazhymukan Munaitpasov Stadium; Attendance: 3,500; Referee: Aleksandr Aliyev

22 October 2017 31	Ordabasy	2 – 1	Astana	Shymkent
15:00 (UTC+6)	Tungyshbayev 35' (yellow card) 78'; Diakate 62'; Nurgaliev (yellow card) 88'	Report	B.Shaikhov (yellow card) 22'; Despotović 60'; Tagybergen (yellow card) 61'	Stadium: Kazhymukan Munaitpasov Stadium; Attendance: 6,500; Referee: Bagdat Abdullaev

28 October 2017 32	Aktobe	2 – 0	Ordabasy	Aktobe
15:00 (UTC+6)	A.Shurigin (yellow card) 35'; Muarem 55'; Šimkovič 76'	Report		Stadium: Central Stadium; Attendance: 4,500; Referee: Daniyar Sakhi

5 November 2017 33	Ordabasy	3 – 2	Okzhetpes	Shymkent
15:00 (UTC+6)	Yordanov 51', 80', 87'; B.Kozhabayev (yellow card) 63'; Bekbaev (yellow card) 74'; Mukhtarov (yellow card) 82'	Report	Dosmagambetov 40' (yellow card) 63'; O.Nedashkovsky 56'; T.Adyrbekov (yellow card) 78'; N.Dairov (yellow card) 90+1'	Stadium: Kazhymukan Munaitpasov Stadium; Attendance: 4,000; Referee: Saken Bayimbet

==== League table ====
Pos	Team	Pld	W	D	L	GF	GA	GD	Pts	Qualification or relegation
1	Astana (C)	33	25	4	4	74	21	+53	79	Qualification for the Champions League first qualifying round
2	Kairat	33	23	9	1	75	28	+47	78	Qualification for the Europa League first qualifying round (Note: Kairat qualified for the Europa League first qualifying round by winning the 2017 Kazakhstan Cup.)
3	Ordabasy	33	18	4	11	44	37	+7	58	
4	Irtysh Pavlodar	33	12	12	9	35	32	+3	48	Qualification for the Europa League first qualifying round (Note: Ordabasy would have qualified too, but they failed to obtain a licence, so Tobol took their place.)
5	Tobol	33	12	11	10	36	26	+10	47	Qualification for the Europa League first qualifying round

Source: UEFA, Soccerway
Rules for classification: 1) Points; 2) Head-to-head points; 3) Head-to-head matches won; 4) Head-to-head goal difference; 5) Head-to-head goals scored; 6) Head-to-head away goals scored; 7) Goal difference; 8) Matches won; 9) Goals scored; 10) Away goals scored; 11) Draw.
(C) Champions

=== Kazakhstan Cup ===
19 April 2017 Last 16	Kyzylzhar	0 – 1	Ordabasy	Petropavl
16:00 (UTC+6)	I.Aitov (yellow card) 44'	Report	Gogua (yellow card) 22' (goal) 59' (pen.); S.Zhumahanov (yellow card) 90'; Ashirbekov (yellow card) 90+3'	Stadium: Avangard Stadium; Attendance: 8,000; Referee: Bolat Saryev

10 May 2017 Quarterfinal	Zhetysu	0 – 1	Ordabasy	Taldykorgan
17:00 (UTC+6)	S.Sagyndykov (yellow card) 69'	Report	S.Zhumahanov (yellow card) 59'; B.Beisenov 64'	Stadium: Zhetysu Stadium; Attendance: 1,500; Referee: Daniyar Sakhi

24 May 2017 Semifinal 1st leg	Ordabasy	0 – 0	Kairat	Shymkent
17:30 (UTC+6)	Simčević (yellow card) 84'	Report	Elek (yellow card) 42'; Akhmetov (yellow card) 45+2' (yellow-red card) 72'; Anene (yellow card) 90+3'	Stadium: Kazhymukan Munaitpasov Stadium; Attendance: 3,000; Referee: Igor Aleshin

21 June 2017 Semifinal 2nd leg	Kairat	3 – 1 (3 – 1 agg.)	Ordabasy	Almaty
19:00 (UTC+6)	Islamkhan 23'; Arshavin 30'; Gohou 37'	Report	Erlanov (yellow card) 50' (yellow-red card) 84'; Diakate (yellow card) 80'; Fontanello (yellow card) 85'; V.Li 90+2' (pen.)	Stadium: Central Stadium; Attendance: 6,800; Referee: Artyom Kuchin

=== UEFA Europa League ===
==== Qualifying rounds ====
30 June 2017 First qualifying round 1st leg	Široki Brijeg (Bosnia and Herzegovina)	2 – 0	(Kazakhstan) Ordabasy	Široki Brijeg, Bosnia and Herzegovina
00:30 (UTC+6)	Bralić (yellow card) 23'; Krstanović 37' (pen.), 45+1'; Barišić (yellow card) 83'	Report	Diakate (yellow card) 39'	Stadium: Stadion Pecara; Referee: Ferenc Karakó (Hungary)

6 July 2017 First qualifying round 2nd leg	Ordabasy (Kazakhstan)	0 – 0 (0 – 2 agg.)	(Bosnia and Herzegovina) Široki Brijeg	Almaty, (Note: Ordabasy will play their home match at Central Stadium, Almaty, instead of their regular stadium Kazhymukan Munaitpasov Stadium, Shymkent.) Kazakhstan
20:00 (UTC+6)	Tungyshbayev (yellow card) 68'; Erlanov (yellow card) 79'; Simčević (yellow card) 87'; Yordanov (yellow card) 89'	Report	Krstanović (yellow card) 71'	Stadium: Central Stadium; Referee: Zaven Hovhannisyan (Armenia)

== Squad statistics ==
As of match played 5 November 2017

=== Appearances and goals ===
No.	Pos	Nat	Player	Total		Premier League		Kazakhstan Cup		Europa League	
No.	Pos	Nat	Player	Apps	Goals	Apps	Goals	Apps	Goals	Apps	Goals
1	GK	(Kazakhstan) KAZ	Almat Bekbaev	25	0	20	0	3	0	2	0
2	DF	(Kazakhstan) KAZ	Baudaulet Kozhabayev	11	0	4+5	0	1+1	0	0	0
4	DF	(Kazakhstan) KAZ	Mukhtar Mukhtarov	2	0	2	0	0	0	0	0
6	DF	(Kazakhstan) KAZ	Ular Zhaksybaev	2	0	0+2	0	0	0	0	0
7	FW	(Kazakhstan) KAZ	Tanat Nusserbayev	24	9	19+3	9	1	0	1	0
8	MF	(Kazakhstan) KAZ	Samat Smakov	26	1	22	1	2	0	2	0
9	MF	(Kazakhstan) KAZ	Vitali Li	6	1	0+3	0	0+1	1	1+1	0
10	MF	(Kazakhstan) KAZ	Kairat Ashirbekov	6	0	2+2	0	1+1	0	0	0
11	MF	(Ukraine) UKR	Kyrylo Kovalchuk	34	4	28+1	4	3	0	2	0
13	MF	(Kazakhstan) KAZ	Azat Nurgaliev	32	5	28	5	2	0	2	0
14	DF	(Argentina) ARG	Pablo Fontanello	29	3	23+1	3	3	0	2	0
17	MF	(Kazakhstan) KAZ	Mardan Tolebek	30	4	25+1	4	2	0	2	0
18	MF	(Croatia) CRO	Oliver Petrak	8	0	6+2	0	0	0	0	0
20	DF	(Kazakhstan) KAZ	Sagdat Tursynbay	2	0	2	0	0	0	0	0
21	MF	(Kazakhstan) KAZ	Yerkebulan Tungyshbayev	35	5	23+6	5	3+1	0	2	0
22	MF	(Senegal) SEN	Abdoulaye Diakate	35	2	31	2	2	0	2	0
25	GK	(Kazakhstan) KAZ	Ramil Nurmukhametov	14	0	13	0	1	0	0	0
30	MF	(Kazakhstan) KAZ	Sanat Zhumahanov	11	0	3+4	0	2+1	0	0+1	0
32	DF	(Kazakhstan) KAZ	Temirlan Erlanov	29	1	25	1	2	0	1+1	0
33	FW	(Bulgaria) BUL	Preslav Yordanov	19	5	10+7	5	0+1	0	0+1	0
50	MF	(Uzbekistan) UZB	Alexander Geynrikh	18	0	4+12	0	1+1	0	0	0
55	DF	(Kazakhstan) KAZ	Farkhadbek Irismetov	3	0	2+1	0	0	0	0	0
69	MF	(Russia) RUS	Nikita Bocharov	36	0	26+6	0	2	0	1+1	0
77	FW	(Serbia) SRB	Srđan Vujaklija	7	3	3+4	3	0	0	0	0
81	MF	(Colombia) COL	Roger Cañas	12	0	9+3	0	0	0	0	0
87	DF	(Serbia) SRB	Aleksandar Simčević	20	0	16	0	2	0	2	0
88	MF	(Kazakhstan) KAZ	Bekzat Beisenov	17	1	4+11	0	2	1	0	0
Players away from Ordabasy on loan:
77	DF	(Kazakhstan) KAZ	Talgat Adyrbekov	3	0	0+1	0	1+1	0	0	0
Players who left Ordabasy during the season:
5	DF	(Serbia) SRB	Zoran Rendulić	5	0	4	0	1	0	0	0
23	DF	(Kazakhstan) KAZ	Rinat Abdulin	5	0	2+1	0	2	0	0	0
27	FW	(Kazakhstan) KAZ	Alibek Buleshev	7	0	0+4	0	2+1	0	0	0
34	MF	(Georgia (country)) GEO	Gogita Gogua	9	2	2+4	1	2+1	1	0	0
88	FW	(Georgia (country)) GEO	Otar Martsvaladze	10	1	4+4	1	1+1	0	0	0

=== Goal scorers ===
Place	Position	Nation	Number	Name	Premier League	Kazakhstan Cup	Champions League	Total	
1	FW	(Kazakhstan)	7	Tanat Nusserbayev	9	0	0	9	
2	MF	(Kazakhstan)	13	Azat Nurgaliev	5	0	0	5	
2	MF	(Kazakhstan)	21	Yerkebulan Tungyshbayev	5	0	0	5	
2	FW	(Bulgaria)	33	Preslav Yordanov	5	0	0	5	
5	MF	(Ukraine)	11	Kyrylo Kovalchuk	4	0	0	4	
5	MF	(Kazakhstan)	17	Mardan Tolebek	4	0	0	4	
7	DF	(Argentina)	40	Pablo Fontanello	3	0	0	3	
7	FW	(Serbia)	77	Srđan Vujaklija	3	0	0	2	
9	MF	(Senegal)	22	Abdoulaye Diakate	2	0	0	2	
9	MF	(Georgia (country))	34	Gogita Gogua	1	1	0	2	
11	FW	(Georgia (country))	88	Otar Martsvaladze	1	0	0	1	
11	DF	(Kazakhstan)	32	Temirlan Erlanov	1	0	0	1	
11	MF	(Kazakhstan)	8	Samat Smakov	1	0	0	1	
11	MF	(Kazakhstan)	88	Bekzat Beisenov	0	1	0	1	
11	MF	(Kazakhstan)	9	Vitali Li	0	1	0	1	
11					TOTALS	44	3	0	47

=== Disciplinary record ===
Number	Nation	Position	Name	Premier League		Kazakhstan Cup		Champions League		Total	
Number	Nation	Position	Name	Yellow card	Red card	Yellow card	Red card	Yellow card	Red card	Yellow card	Red card
1	(Kazakhstan)	GK	Almat Bekbaev	2	0	0	0	0	0	2	0
2	(Kazakhstan)	DF	Baudaulet Kozhabayev	3	0	0	0	0	0	3	0
4	(Kazakhstan)	DF	Mukhtar Mukhtarov	2	0	0	0	0	0	2	0
5	(Serbia)	DF	Zoran Rendulić	1	0	0	0	0	0	1	0
7	(Kazakhstan)	FW	Tanat Nusserbayev	7	0	0	0	0	0	7	0
8	(Kazakhstan)	MF	Samat Smakov	2	0	0	0	0	0	2	0
9	(Kazakhstan)	MF	Vitali Li	1	0	0	0	0	0	1	0
10	(Kazakhstan)	MF	Kairat Ashirbekov	0	0	1	0	0	0	1	0
11	(Ukraine)	MF	Kyrylo Kovalchuk	6	0	0	0	0	0	6	0
13	(Kazakhstan)	MF	Azat Nurgaliev	6	0	0	0	0	0	6	0
17	(Kazakhstan)	MF	Mardan Tolebek	4	1	0	0	0	0	4	1
18	(Croatia)	MF	Oliver Petrak	2	0	0	0	0	0	2	0
21	(Kazakhstan)	MF	Yerkebulan Tungyshbayev	8	0	0	0	1	0	9	0
22	(Senegal)	MF	Abdoulaye Diakate	3	0	1	0	1	0	5	0
27	(Kazakhstan)	FW	Alibek Buleshev	1	0	0	0	0	0	1	0
30	(Kazakhstan)	MF	Sanat Zhumahanov	1	0	2	0	0	0	3	0
32	(Kazakhstan)	DF	Temirlan Erlanov	7	0	2	1	1	0	10	1
33	(Bulgaria)	FW	Preslav Yordanov	0	0	0	0	1	0	1	0
34	(Georgia (country))	MF	Gogita Gogua	2	0	1	0	0	0	3	0
40	(Argentina)	DF	Pablo Fontanello	1	0	1	0	0	0	2	0
69	(Russia)	MF	Nikita Bocharov	1	0	0	0	0	0	1	0
81	(Colombia)	MF	Roger Cañas	1	0	0	0	0	0	1	0
87	(Serbia)	DF	Aleksandar Simčević	5	1	0	0	1	0	6	1
88	(Kazakhstan)	MF	Bekzat Beisenov	2	0	0	0	0	0	2	0
			TOTALS	67	2	9	1	5	0	81	3
