= 2016 FC Okzhetpes season =

FC Okzhetpes
2016 season
- Chairman: Saparbek Kakishev
- Manager: Vladimir Mukhanov
- Stadium: Okzhetpes Stadium
- Kazakhstan Premier League: 5th
- Kazakhstan Cup: Quarterfinal vs Irtysh Pavlodar
- Top goalscorer: League: Serge Bando N'Gambé (9); All: Marat Khairullin (10)
Home colours	Away colours

The 2016 FC Okzhetpes season is the club's second season back in the Kazakhstan Premier League, the highest tier of association football in Kazakhstan, and 20th in total. Okzhetpes will also take part in the Kazakhstan Cup.

== Squad ==
As of 30 September 2016

Note: Flags indicate national team as defined under FIFA eligibility rules; some limited exceptions apply. Players may hold more than one non-FIFA nationality.

No.	Pos.	Nation	Player
1	GK	SRB	Saša Stamenković
5	MF	KAZ	Anatoli Bogdanov
6	DF	KAZ	Ilnur Mangutkin
7	FW	KAZ	Sanat Zhumahanov
8	DF	RUS	Daniil Chertov
11	MF	RUS	Vitali Volkov
14	MF	KAZ	Igor Yurin
15	DF	KAZ	Anton Kuksin
17	FW	KAZ	Zhasulan Moldakaraev
18	MF	SRB	Risto Ristović

No.	Pos.	Nation	Player
21	MF	KAZ	Zhakyp Kozhamberdi
23	DF	KAZ	Miras Tuliyev
24	GK	KAZ	Dzhurakhon Babakhanov
25	GK	KAZ	Ruslan Abzhanov
29	MF	CMR	Joseph Nane
32	FW	CHI	Nicolás Canales
36	DF	KAZ	Oleg Lebedev
77	DF	UKR	Oleksandr Chyzhov
88	FW	CMR	Serge Bando N'Gambé

== Transfers ==
=== Winter ===
In: Note: Flags indicate national team as defined under FIFA eligibility rules; some limited exceptions apply. Players may hold more than one non-FIFA nationality.

No.	Pos.	Nation	Player
1	GK	SRB	Saša Stamenković (from (Greece) Kerkyra)
5	MF	KAZ	Anatoli Bogdanov (from (Kazakhstan) Tobol)
7	FW	KAZ	Sanat Zhumahanov (from (Kazakhstan) Taraz)
14	MF	KAZ	Igor Yurin (from (Kazakhstan) Tobol)
17	FW	KAZ	Zhasulan Moldakaraev (from (Kazakhstan) Kaisar)
18	MF	SRB	Risto Ristović (from (Serbia) Voždovac)
19	MF	KAZ	Marat Khayrullin (from (Kazakhstan) Aktobe)
21	MF	KAZ	Zhakyp Kozhamberdi (to (Kazakhstan) Astana)
24	GK	KAZ	Dzhurakhon Babakhanov (from (Kazakhstan) Taraz)
29	MF	CMR	Joseph Nane (from (United States) San Antonio Scorpions)
33	FW	RUS	Aleksandr Alkhazov (from (Russia) Volgar Astrakhan)
66	DF	KAZ	Anton Chichulin (from (Kazakhstan) Atyrau)
88	FW	CMR	Serge Bando N'Gambé (from (France) Villefranche)

Out: Note: Flags indicate national team as defined under FIFA eligibility rules; some limited exceptions apply. Players may hold more than one non-FIFA nationality.

No.	Pos.	Nation	Player
1	GK	KAZ	Yaroslav Baginskiy (to (Kazakhstan) Shakhter Karagandy)
3	DF	KAZ	Yegor Azovskiy (to (Kazakhstan) Aktobe)
7	MF	KAZ	Ruslan Sakhalbayev
8	MF	KAZ	Yerkin Nurzhanov
14	DF	KAZ	Viktor Kryukov (to (Kazakhstan) Aktobe)
17	MF	BLR	Alyaksandr Pawlaw (to (Belarus) Shakhtyor Soligorsk)
18	MF	KAZ	Ruslan Kenetayev
19	MF	KAZ	Daniyar Nukebay
20	GK	KAZ	Anton Tsirin (to (Kazakhstan) Irtysh Pavlodar)
22	DF	CZE	Michal Smejkal (loan return to (Czech Republic) Mladá Boleslav)
24	DF	KAZ	Aleksandr Marochkin
26	FW	RUS	Dmitri Sychev (loan return to from (Russia) Lokomotiv Moscow)
27	MF	KAZ	Pavel Shabalin (to (Kazakhstan) Atyrau)
28	FW	KAZ	Sergey Gridin (from (Kazakhstan) Akzhayik)
29	MF	SRB	Ivan Cvetković (to (Serbia) Jagodina)
45	MF	MNE	Luka Rotković (to (Belarus) Dinamo Minsk)

=== Summer ===
In: Note: Flags indicate national team as defined under FIFA eligibility rules; some limited exceptions apply. Players may hold more than one non-FIFA nationality.

No.	Pos.	Nation	Player
4	DF	KAZ	Aleksandr Kislitsyn (from (Kazakhstan) Irtysh Pavlodar)
32	FW	CHI	Nicolás Canales (from (Azerbaijan) Neftçi Baku)

Out: Note: Flags indicate national team as defined under FIFA eligibility rules; some limited exceptions apply. Players may hold more than one non-FIFA nationality.

No.	Pos.	Nation	Player
4	DF	KAZ	Aleksandr Kislitsyn
10	FW	KAZ	Alibek Buleshev
19	MF	KAZ	Marat Khayrullin
33	FW	RUS	Aleksandr Alkhazov (to (Russia) Mordovia Saransk)
66	DF	KAZ	Anton Chichulin

== Friendlies ==
17 January 2016	Anzhi Makhachkala (Russia)	3 – 0	(Kazakhstan) Okzhetpes	Abu Dhabi, United Arab Emirates
(UTC+6)	Moutari 31'; Abdulavov 34', 45'; Berisha (yellow card) 38'; Dibirgadzhiyev (yellow card) 83'	Summary

19 January 2016	Pakhtakor Tashkent (Uzbekistan)	0 – 3	(Kazakhstan) Okzhetpes	United Arab Emirates
(UTC+6)		Summary	Buleshev 55' (pen.), 88'; N.Aliyev 90'

25 January 2016	Al-Salam (Oman)	1 – 5	(Kazakhstan) Okzhetpes	United Arab Emirates
(UTC+6)	Goal	Summary	Moldakaraev 28'; R.Sakhalbayev 50'; Muhammad 54'; Gridin 84'; Buleshev 86'

5 February 2016	Sioni (Georgia (country))	0 – 0	(Kazakhstan) Okzhetpes	Belek Turkey
(UTC+6)		Summary

8 February 2016	Belshina Bobruisk (Belarus)	1 – 1	(Kazakhstan) Okzhetpes	Belek Turkey
(UTC+6)	Goal	Summary	Buleshev 11'

11 February 2016	Pirin Blagoevgrad (Bulgaria)	0 – 0	(Kazakhstan) Okzhetpes	Belek Turkey
(UTC+6)		Summary

13 February 2016	Lustenau 07 (Austria)	1 – 1	(Kazakhstan) Okzhetpes	Belek Turkey
(UTC+6)	Goal	Summary	Chyzhov

== Competitions ==
=== Kazakhstan Premier League ===
==== Regular season ====
===== Results summary =====
Overall								Home						Away					
Pld	W	D	L	GF	GA	GD	Pts	W	D	L	GF	GA	GD	W	D	L	GF	GA	GD
22	11	4	7	33	23	+10	37	6	3	2	19	8	+11	5	1	5	14	15	−1

Last updated: 24 July 2016.
Source: See Results

===== Results by round =====
Round	1	2	3	4	5	6	7	8	9	10	11	12	13	14	15	16	17	18	19	20	21	22
Ground	A	H	A	A	H	A	H	A	H	A	H	A	H	H	A	H	A	H	A	H	A	A
Result	L	D	W	W	W	W	W	L	L	W	D	L	D	W	L	W	D	W	L	W	W	L
Position	11	9	5	4	3	3	3	3	3	3	3	4	4	4	4	4	4	4	4	4	4	4

Source: See results
A = Away; H = Home; W = Win; D = Draw; L = Loss

===== Results =====
13 March 2016 1	Irtysh Pavlodar	1 – 0	Okzhetpes	Pavlodar
15:00 (UTC+6)	Malyi 41'	Summary	Chertov (yellow card) 54'	Stadium: Central Stadium; Attendance: 5,500; Referee: Askhat Abdanbayev

19 March 2016 2	Okzhetpes	1 – 1	Kairat	Astana
16:00 (UTC+6)	Khairullin (yellow card) 39'; Buleshev 49' (yellow card) 59'; I.Mangutkin (yellow card) 65'; Moldakaraev (yellow card) 79'	Summary	Bakayev (yellow card) 34'; Gohou 44'	Stadium: Astana Arena; Attendance: 4,000; Referee: Denis Tevyashov

3 April 2016 3	Taraz	1 – 3	Okzhetpes	Taraz
16:00 (UTC+6)	M.Amirkhanov (yellow card) 37'; Shakhmetov 44'	Summary	Buleshev 25' (pen.); Nane (yellow card) 43'; Chertov (yellow card) 50'; Kozhamberdi (yellow card) 55'; Chichulin 75'; N'Gambé 78'	Stadium: Central Stadium; Attendance: 2,500; Referee: Aydin Rakhimbayev

9 April 2016 4	Akzhayik	0 – 2	Okzhetpes	Oral
15:00 (UTC+6)	Nikolić (yellow card) 43'; Govedarica (yellow card) 52'; Z.Korobov (yellow card) 71'	Summary	Buleshev 25'; Kozhamberdi (yellow card) 65'; Nane (yellow card) 78'; Moldakaraev (yellow card) 82'; Ristović 90+3'	Stadium: Petr Atoyan Stadium; Attendance: 2,500; Referee: Tiumur Kumashev

13 April 2016 5	Okzhetpes	2 – 0	Atyrau	Astana
17:00 (UTC+6)	Chichulin (yellow card) 25'; Khayrullin 43'; Chyzhov (yellow card) 43'; Moldakaraev 59'	Summary	Curtean (yellow card) 18'; Shabalin (yellow card) 39'; Korobkin (yellow card) 57'; R.Esatov (yellow card) 90+1'	Stadium: Astana Arena; Attendance: 1,500; Referee: Aleksandr Aliyev

17 April 2016 6	Shakhter Karagandy	0 – 1	Okzhetpes	Karaganda
15:00 (UTC+6)	Szöke (yellow card) 90+3'	Summary	Chyzhov 31'; Bogdanov (yellow card) 90+2'	Stadium: Shakhter Stadium; Attendance: 1,500; Referee: Akmalkhan Kholmatov

23 April 2016 7	Okzhetpes	2 – 0	Ordabasy	Astana
16:00 (UTC+6)	Chyzhov 2'; Moldakaraev 3'; Ristović (yellow card) 12'; A.Kuksin (yellow card) 43'; Kozhamberdi (yellow card) 56'	Summary	Trajković (yellow card) 12'; Abdulin (yellow card) 55'	Stadium: Astana Arena; Attendance: 3,800; Referee: Denis Izmailov

1 May 2016 8	Aktobe	1 – 0	Okzhetpes	Aktobe
18:00 (UTC+6)	Sorokin (yellow card) 42'; V.Kryukov (yellow card) 44'; D.Zhalmukan (yellow card) 45'; Smakov 73' (pen.); A.Kakimov (yellow card) 89'	Summary	Yurin (yellow card) 4'; Kozhamberdi (yellow card) 45'; Ristović (yellow card) 72'; Chertov (yellow card) 73'; Volkov (yellow card) 90+3'	Stadium: Central Stadium; Attendance: 6,500; Referee: Viktor Antonov

5 May 2016 9	Okzhetpes	1 – 0	Astana	Shchuchinsk
17:00 (UTC+6)	Nane (yellow card) 66'	Summary	Despotović 74'	Stadium: Zhaksy Stadium; Attendance: 500; Referee: Artyom Kuchin

10 May 2016 10	Zhetysu	1 – 4	Okzhetpes	Taldykorgan
17:00 (UTC+6)	T.Adilkhanov (yellow card) 10'; Simonovski 78'	Summary	Khayrullin 2', 90+4'; A.Kuksin (yellow card) 26'; N'Gambé 32'; Moldakaraev 59'; Chyzhov (yellow card) 89'	Stadium: Zhetysu Stadium; Attendance: 1,500; Referee: Ruslan Duzmambetov

15 May 2016 11	Okzhetpes	1 – 1	Tobol	Shchuchinsk
17:00 (UTC+6)	N'Gambé 16'; Kozhamberdi (yellow card) 80'; Chyzhov (yellow card) 90+1'	Summary	Khizhnichenko 88'; N'Diaye (yellow card) 90+2'	Stadium: Zhaksy Stadium; Attendance: 550; Referee: Marat Iskakov

21 May 2016 12	Kairat	6 – 0	Okzhetpes	Almaty
18:00 (UTC+6)	Marković (yellow card) 21'; Arshavin 28', 52' (yellow card) 33'; Islamkhan (yellow card) 41' (goal) 54', 68' (pen.); Gohou 82', 85'	Summary	Stamenković (yellow card) 67'; Yurin (yellow card) 76'; A.Kuksin (yellow card) 80'	Stadium: Central Stadium; Attendance: 6,500; Referee: Denis Tevyashov

29 May 2016 13	Okzhetpes	0 – 0	Taraz	Astana
18:00 (UTC+6)	Chertov (yellow card) 40' (yellow-red card) 85'	Summary	B.Baitana (yellow card) 28'; O.Nedashkovsky (yellow card) 81'; A.Taubay (yellow card) 90'	Stadium: Astana Arena; Attendance: 1,500; Referee: Akmalkhan Kholmatov

2 June 2016 14	Okzhetpes	4 – 2	Akzhayik	Astana
16:00 (UTC+6)	N'Gambé 10', 51'; Ristović 35'; Khayrullin 44'; S.Zhumahanov (yellow card) 81'	Summary	I.Antipov 7'; Govedarica (yellow card) 28'; Nikolić (yellow card) 33'; Valiullin (yellow card) 45'; K.Begalin 81'	Stadium: Astana Arena; Attendance: 1,000; Referee: Aydin Rakhimbayev

11 June 2016 15	Atyrau	2 – 1	Okzhetpes	Atyrau
20:00 (UTC+6)	Shabalin 28'; Trytko 53'; Korobkin (yellow card) 62'; Muldarov (yellow card) 90+1'	Summary	Chichulin (yellow card) 44'; Khairullin (yellow card) 45+2'; N'Gambé 47'	Stadium: Munaishy Stadium; Attendance: 3,500; Referee: Igor Aleshin

15 June 2016 16	Okzhetpes	3 – 0	Shakhter Karagandy	Kokshetau
19:00 (UTC+6)	Moldakaraev 6', 42' (pen.); Chertov 68'	Summary		Stadium: Okzhetpes Stadium; Attendance: 2,500; Referee: Viktor Antonov

19 June 2016 17	Ordabasy	2 – 2	Okzhetpes	Shymkent
19:00 (UTC+6)	Abdulin (yellow card) 3'; Diakate 30'; G.Suyumbaev 36'	Summary	Chertov (yellow card) 17'; Buleshev 54'; Yurin 64'; S.Zhumahanov (yellow card) 75'	Stadium: Kazhymukan Munaitpasov Stadium; Attendance: 4,500; Referee: Askhat Abdanbayev

24 June 2016 18	Okzhetpes	4 – 1	Aktobe	Kokshetau
19:00 (UTC+6)	Khairullin 20', 41'; Kislitsyn 35'; Buleshev 67'	Summary	Golubov 87'	Stadium: Okzhetpes Stadium; Attendance: 2,500; Referee: Aydin Rakhimbayev

5 July 2016 19	Astana	1 – 0	Okzhetpes	Astana
19:00 (UTC+6)	Nusserbayev (yellow card) 22'; Nurgaliev (yellow card) 38'; Logvinenko (yellow card) 60'; Kabananga 86'; Cañas (yellow card) 90+3'	Summary	Chichulin (yellow card) 24'; Khairullin (yellow card) 53'	Stadium: Astana Arena; Referee: Artyom Kuchin

10 July 2016 20	Okzhetpes	2 – 0	Zhetysu	Kokshetau
19:00 (UTC+6)	Buleshev 63' (yellow card) 63'; Kozhamberdi (yellow card) 71'; Chyzhov (yellow card) 89'; Moldakaraev 90+1'	Summary	I.Amirseitov (yellow card) 60'; Klein (yellow card) 70'; A.Shabaev (yellow card) 87'	Stadium: Okzhetpes Stadium; Attendance: 1,500; Referee: Aleksandr Aliyev

16 July 2016 21	Tobol	0 – 1	Okzhetpes	Kostanay
19:00 (UTC+6)	Zhumaskaliyev (yellow card) 76'	Summary	Ristović (yellow card) 21'; Yurin 64'; Stamenković (yellow card) 90'	Stadium: Central Stadium; Attendance: 3,500; Referee: Sergey Gorokhovodatskiy

24 July 2016 22	Okzhetpes	0 – 2	Irtysh Pavlodar	Kokshetau
19:00 (UTC+6)	Buleshev (yellow card) 37' (yellow-red card) 89'; D.Babakhanov (yellow card) 73'; Moldakaraev (yellow card) 79'; Chichulin (yellow card) 86'	Summary	R.Murtazayev 27'; Grigalashvili (yellow card) 36'; Geteriev (yellow card) 61' (goal) 67'	Stadium: Okzhetpes Stadium; Attendance: 3,500; Referee: Aydin Rakhimbayev

===== League table =====
Pos	Team	Pld	W	D	L	GF	GA	GD	Pts	Qualification
2	Kairat	22	14	4	4	50	22	+28	46	Qualification for the championship round
3	Irtysh Pavlodar	22	12	5	5	37	18	+19	41	Qualification for the championship round
4	Okzhetpes	22	11	4	7	33	23	+10	37	Qualification for the championship round
5	Ordabasy	22	9	6	7	26	27	−1	33	Qualification for the championship round
6	Aktobe	22	7	7	8	23	32	−9	28 (Note: Head-to-head record: Aktobe (7 points), Atyrau (5 points), Tobol (4 points).)	Qualification for the championship round

Source: UEFA.com, Soccerway
Rules for classification: 1) Points; 2) Head-to-head points; 3) Head-to-head matches won; 4) Head-to-head goal difference; 5) Head-to-head goals scored; 6) Head-to-head away goals scored; 7) Goal difference; 8) Matches won; 9) Goals scored; 10) Away goals scored; 11) Draw.

==== Championship round ====
===== Results summary =====
Overall								Home						Away					
Pld	W	D	L	GF	GA	GD	Pts	W	D	L	GF	GA	GD	W	D	L	GF	GA	GD
10	2	2	6	9	21	−12	8	1	1	3	5	10	−5	1	1	3	4	11	−7

Last updated: 31 October 2016.
Source: See Results

===== Results by round =====
Round	1	2	3	4	5	6	7	8	9	10
Ground	H	A	H	A	H	A	A	H	H	A
Result	L	W	L	L	L	L	D	W	D	L
Position	4	4	4	5	5	5	5	5	5	5

Source: See Results
A = Away; H = Home; W = Win; D = Draw; L = Loss

===== Results =====
13 August 2016 1	Okzhetpes	1 – 3	Kairat	Kokshetau
17:00 (UTC+6)	Canales 45+1'; M.Tuliyev (yellow card) 90'; Kozhamberdi (yellow card) 90+3'	Summary	Islamkhan 17' (pen.); Gohou (yellow card) 28'; Arzo (yellow card) 43'; Isael 55'; G.Suyumbaev (yellow card) 75'; Acevedo 90+4'	Stadium: Okzhetpes Stadium; Attendance: 3,000; Referee: Artyom Kuchin

20 August 2016 2	Irtysh Pavlodar	0 – 2	Okzhetpes	Pavlodar
17:00 (UTC+6)		Summary	I.Mangutkin (yellow card) 11'; Canales 21'; Khairullin 88'	Stadium: Central Stadium; Attendance: 3,500; Referee: Askhat Abdanbayev

26 August 2016 3	Okzhetpes	Postponed	Astana	Kokshetau
(UTC+6)		[ Summary]		Stadium: Okzhetpes Stadium

12 September 2016 4	Okzhetpes	0 – 3	Aktobe	Astana
19:00 (UTC+6)	Chichulin (yellow card) 54'	Summary	Bocharov 15'; Tsveiba (yellow card) 33'; Shchotkin 49', 90+5'; B.Kairov (yellow card) 57'; D.Zhalmukan (yellow card) 77'	Stadium: Astana Arena; Attendance: 1,500; Referee: Igor Aleshin

17 September 2016 5	Ordabasy	1 – 0	Okzhetpes	Shymkent
17:00 (UTC+6)	Geynrikh 16'; M.Tolebek (yellow card) 77'	Summary	Chyzhov (yellow card) 23'; Kislitsyn (yellow card) 30'; Nane (yellow card) 42'; Chichulin (yellow card) 80'	Stadium: Kazhymukan Munaitpasov Stadium; Attendance: 2,500; Referee: Aleksandr Gauzer

25 September 2016 6	Okzhetpes	1 – 4	Irtysh Pavlodar	Kokshetau
16:00 (UTC+6)	Khairullin 37' (pen.) (red card) 59'	Summary	Fonseca 17'; Murtazayev 52', 55'; Geteriev 76'	Stadium: Okzhetpes Stadium; Attendance: 1,500; Referee: Aleksandr Aliyev

2 October 2016 7	Astana	3 – 0	Okzhetpes	Astana
19:00 (UTC+6)	Twumasi 2', 89'; Logvinenko (yellow card) 45'; Nurgaliev 56'	Summary	Yurin (yellow card) 61'; Kozhamberdi (yellow card) 64'	Stadium: Astana Arena; Attendance: 2,200; Referee: Askhat Abdanbayev

15 October 2016 8	Aktobe	2 – 2	Okzhetpes	Aktobe
18:00 (UTC+6)	Abilgazy 37' (o.g.); Tsveiba (yellow card) 69'; Sorokin (yellow card) 71'; A.Kakimov (yellow card) 76'; D.Zhalmukan 79'	Summary	N'Gambé 33', 84'; Kozhamberdi (yellow card) 45+1'; M.Tuliyev (yellow card) 51'; Yurin (yellow card) 65'	Stadium: Central Stadium; Attendance: 3,500; Referee: Aydin Rakhimbayev

23 October 2016 9	Okzhetpes	3 – 0	Ordabasy	Kokshetau
15:00 (UTC+6)	Moldakaraev (yellow card) 46'; N'Gambé 60'; Ristović 62'; A.Kuksin (yellow card) 77'; S.Zhumahanov 90'	Summary		Stadium: Okzhetpes Stadium; Attendance: 1,500; Referee: Sergey Gorokhovodatskiy

26 October 2016 3	Okzhetpes	0 – 0	Astana	Kokshetau
15:00 (UTC+6)		Summary	Logvinenko (yellow card) 67'	Stadium: Okzhetpes Stadium; Referee: Igor Chesnokov

29 October 2016 10	Kairat	5 – 0	Okzhetpes	Almaty
15:00 (UTC+6)	Gohou 1'; Tymoshchuk (yellow card) 35'; Isael (yellow card) 38' (goal) 46'; Islamkhan 49'; G.Suyumbaev (yellow card) 53' (goal) 86'; Kuat 67'	Summary	Chyzhov (yellow card) 73'	Stadium: Central Stadium; Attendance: 6,800; Referee: Artyom Kuchin

===== League table =====
Pos	Team	Pld	W	D	L	GF	GA	GD	Pts	Qualification
1	Astana (C)	32	23	4	5	47	21	+26	73	Qualification for the Champions League second qualifying round (Note: Astana qualified for the Europa League first qualifying round by winning the 2016 Kazakhstan Cup. However, since they already qualified for European competition based on their league position, the spot awarded to the cup winners was passed down the league.)
2	Kairat	32	22	5	5	75	30	+45	71	Qualification for the Europa League first qualifying round
3	Irtysh Pavlodar	32	14	7	11	52	36	+16	49	Qualification for the Europa League first qualifying round
4	Ordabasy	32	13	9	10	41	44	−3	48	Qualification for the Europa League first qualifying round
5	Okzhetpes	32	13	6	13	42	44	−2	45	
6	Aktobe	32	9	9	14	37	52	−15	36	

Source: Soccerway
Rules for classification: 1) Points; 2) Play-off (only if deciding champion when two teams are tied); 3) Head-to-head points; 4) Head-to-head matches won; 5) Head-to-head goal difference; 6) Head-to-head goals scored; 7) Head-to-head away goals scored; 8) Goal difference; 9) Matches won; 10) Goals scored; 11) Away goals scored; 12) Draw.
(C) Champions

=== Kazakhstan Cup ===
27 April 2016 Last 16	Okzhetpes	2 – 1	Taraz	Kokshetau
20:00 (UTC+6)	Bogdanov (yellow card) 36'; Khairullin 45', 90'; Chichulin (red card) 79'; Chertov (yellow card) 81'; Chyzhov (yellow card) 88'	Summary	A.Abdenabi (yellow card) 19'; D.Evstigneev (yellow card) 70'; A.Suley 75'; D.Bayaliev (yellow card) 80'; K.Karaman (yellow card) 81'	Stadium: Okzhetpes Stadium; Attendance: 1,000; Referee: Furkat Atajanow

25 May 2016 Quarterfinal	Okzhetpes	1 – 2	Irtysh Pavlodar	Astana
19:00 (UTC+6)	Ristović (yellow card) 27'; S.Zhumahanov (yellow card) 45'; Chertov 49' (yellow card) 86'	Summary	Fonseca 41' (yellow card) 90+3'; Akhmetov (yellow card) 69'; Fall 73' (yellow card) 86'; Tsirin (yellow card) 90'	Stadium: Astana Arena; Attendance: 1,000; Referee: Sergey Gorokhovodatskiy

== Squad statistics ==
As of Match played 29 October 2016

=== Appearances and goals ===
No.	Pos	Nat	Player	Total		Premier League		Kazakhstan Cup	
No.	Pos	Nat	Player	Apps	Goals	Apps	Goals	Apps	Goals
1	GK	(Serbia) SRB	Saša Stamenković	29	0	29	0	0	0
5	MF	(Kazakhstan) KAZ	Anatoli Bogdanov	6	0	3+1	0	2	0
6	DF	(Kazakhstan) KAZ	Ilnur Mangutkin	25	0	24	0	1	0
7	FW	(Kazakhstan) KAZ	Sanat Zhumahanov	17	1	5+11	1	1	0
8	DF	(Russia) RUS	Daniil Chertov	22	2	18+2	1	2	1
11	MF	(Russia) RUS	Vitali Volkov	32	0	27+4	0	1	0
14	MF	(Kazakhstan) KAZ	Igor Yurin	26	2	19+6	2	1	0
15	DF	(Kazakhstan) KAZ	Anton Kuksin	25	0	16+7	0	2	0
17	FW	(Kazakhstan) KAZ	Zhasulan Moldakaraev	32	6	25+6	6	1	0
18	MF	(Serbia) SRB	Risto Ristović	27	3	12+13	3	1+1	0
21	MF	(Kazakhstan) KAZ	Zhakyp Kozhamberdi	22	0	14+7	0	1	0
23	DF	(Kazakhstan) KAZ	Miras Tuliyev	7	0	5+1	0	1	0
24	GK	(Kazakhstan) KAZ	Dzhurakhon Babakhanov	5	0	3	0	2	0
29	MF	(Cameroon) CMR	Joseph Nane	31	0	30	0	0+1	0
32	FW	(Chile) CHI	Nicolás Canales	11	2	5+6	2	0	0
43	MF	(Kazakhstan) KAZ	Erlan Zhaguparov	1	0	0+1	0	0	0
56	MF	(Kazakhstan) KAZ	Sultan Abilgazy	4	0	1+3	0	0	0
77	DF	(Ukraine) UKR	Oleksandr Chyzhov	28	2	26	2	1+1	0
88	FW	(Cameroon) CMR	Serge Bando N'Gambé	30	9	22+6	9	2	0
Players away from Okzhetpes on loan:
Players who appeared for Okzhetpes that left during the season:
4	DF	(Kazakhstan) KAZ	Aleksandr Kislitsyn	9	1	8+1	1	0	0
10	FW	(Kazakhstan) KAZ	Alibek Buleshev	24	6	10+13	6	0+1	0
19	MF	(Kazakhstan) KAZ	Marat Khayrullin	29	9	27	7	1+1	2
33	FW	(Russia) RUS	Aleksandr Alkhazov	5	0	1+3	0	1	0
66	DF	(Kazakhstan) KAZ	Anton Chichulin	22	1	21	1	1	0

=== Goal scorers ===
Place	Position	Nation	Number	Name	Premier League	Kazakhstan Cup	Total
1	MF	(Kazakhstan)	19	Marat Khayrullin	8	2	10
2	FW	(Cameroon)	88	Serge Bando N'Gambé	9	0	9
3	FW	(Kazakhstan)	17	Zhasulan Moldakaraev	6	0	6
3	FW	(Kazakhstan)	10	Alibek Buleshev	6	0	6
5	MF	(Serbia)	18	Risto Ristović	3	0	3
6	DF	(Ukraine)	77	Oleksandr Chyzhov	2	0	2
6	MF	(Kazakhstan)	14	Igor Yurin	2	0	2
6	FW	(Chile)	32	Nicolás Canales	2	0	2
6	DF	(Russia)	8	Daniil Chertov	1	1	2
9	DF	(Kazakhstan)	66	Anton Chichulin	1	0	1
9	DF	(Kazakhstan)	4	Aleksandr Kislitsyn	1	0	1
9	MF	(Kazakhstan)	7	Sanat Zhumahanov	1	0	1
				TOTALS	42	3	45

=== Disciplinary record ===
Number	Nation	Position	Name	Premier League		Kazakhstan Cup		Total	
Number	Nation	Position	Name	Yellow card	Red card	Yellow card	Red card	Yellow card	Red card
1	(Serbia)	GK	Saša Stamenković	2	0	0	0	2	0
4	(Kazakhstan)	DF	Aleksandr Kislitsyn	1	0	0	0	1	0
5	(Kazakhstan)	MF	Anatoli Bogdanov	1	0	1	0	2	0
6	(Kazakhstan)	DF	Ilnur Mangutkin	2	0	0	0	2	0
7	(Kazakhstan)	MF	Sanat Zhumahanov	2	0	1	0	3	0
8	(Russia)	DF	Daniil Chertov	6	1	2	0	8	1
10	(Kazakhstan)	FW	Alibek Buleshev	4	1	0	0	4	1
11	(Russia)	MF	Vitali Volkov	1	0	0	0	1	0
14	(Kazakhstan)	MF	Igor Yurin	4	0	0	0	4	0
15	(Kazakhstan)	DF	Anton Kuksin	4	0	0	0	4	0
17	(Kazakhstan)	FW	Zhasulan Moldakaraev	4	0	0	0	4	0
18	(Serbia)	MF	Risto Ristović	3	0	1	0	4	0
19	(Kazakhstan)	MF	Marat Khayrullin	3	1	0	0	3	1
21	(Kazakhstan)	MF	Zhakyp Kozhamberdi	9	0	0	0	9	0
23	(Kazakhstan)	DF	Miras Tuliyev	2	0	0	0	2	0
24	(Kazakhstan)	GK	Dzhurakhon Babakhanov	1	0	0	0	1	0
29	(Cameroon)	MF	Joseph Nane	4	0	0	0	4	0
66	(Kazakhstan)	DF	Anton Chichulin	6	0	0	1	6	1
77	(Ukraine)	DF	Oleksandr Chyzhov	6	0	1	0	7	0
			TOTALS	65	3	6	1	71	4
