= 2017 Kazakhstan Premier League =

Kazakhstan Premier League
- Season: 2017
- Champions League: Astana
- Europa League: Kairat; Irtysh; Tobol
- Matches: 198
- Goals: 488 (2.46 per match)
- Top goalscorer: Gerard Gohou (24 goals)
- All statistics correct as of 5 November 2017.

The 2017 Kazakhstan Premier League was the 26th season of the Kazakhstan Premier League, the highest football league competition in Kazakhstan. Astana are the defending champions having won their third league championship the previous year.

On 23 December 2016, a league format change was announced. The previous system of 22 regular season games followed by 10 games in the championship (top six) or relegation (bottom six) round was discontinued. Instead, the teams played 33 games over three rounds, with at least one home game and one away game against each opponent. These 33 games alone decided the champion, European participants and relegation.

== Teams ==
FC Zhetysu and FC Taraz were relegated at the end of the 2016 season, and were replaced by FC Kaisar and FC Altai Semey. However, on 3 February 2017, the Football Federation of Kazakhstan ruled that Altai Semey did not meet the required entry requirements for the Premier League, and ruled that FC Taraz will replace them for the 2017 season.

=== Team overview ===
Locations of teams in the 2017 Kazakhstan Premier League

Team	Location	Venue	Capacity
Aktobe	Aktobe	Aktobe Central Stadium	15,000
Akzhayik	Oral	Petr Atoyan Stadium	8,320
Astana	Astana	Astana Arena	30,000
Atyrau	Atyrau	Munaishy Stadium	8,690
Irtysh	Pavlodar	Pavlodar Central Stadium	15,000
Kairat	Almaty	Almaty Central Stadium	25,057
Kaisar	Kyzylorda	Gany Muratbayev Stadium	7,500
Okzhetpes	Kokshetau	Okzhetpes Stadium	4,158
Ordabasy	Shymkent	Kazhymukan Munaitpasov Stadium	35,000
Shakhter	Karaganda	Shakhter Stadium	20,000
Taraz	Taraz	Taraz Central Stadium	11,525
Tobol	Kostanay	Kostanay Central Stadium	10,500

=== Personnel and kits ===
Note: Flags indicate national team as has been defined under FIFA eligibility rules. Players and Managers may hold more than one non-FIFA nationality.

Team	Manager	Captain	Kit manufacturer	Shirt sponsor
Aktobe	(Kazakhstan) Igor Prokhnitsky		Adidas	—
Akzhayik	(Kazakhstan) Artur Avakyants	(Serbia) (Kazakhstan) Predrag Govedarica	Adidas	Expo 2017
Astana	(Bulgaria) Stanimir Stoilov	(Kazakhstan) Nenad Eric	Adidas	Samruk-Kazyna
Atyrau	(Kazakhstan) Kuanysh Kabdulov (caretaker)	(Kazakhstan) Zhasur Narzikulov	Adidas	—
Irtysh	(Ukraine) Vyacheslav Hroznyi	(Kazakhstan) David Loria	Nike	ENRC
Kairat	(Spain) Carlos Ferrer	(Kazakhstan) Bauyrzhan Islamkhan	Nike	Expo 2017
Kaisar	(Bulgaria) Stoycho Mladenov	(Kazakhstan) Maksat Baizhanov	Nike	Expo 2017
Okzhetpes	(Ukraine) Viktor Pasulko	(Kazakhstan) Alibek Buleshev	Kappa	Chempionat
Ordabasy	(Russia) Aleksei Petrushin	(Kazakhstan) Azat Nurgaliev	Adidas	Aysu Mineral Water
Shakhter	(Lithuania) Saulius Širmelis		Nike	—
Taraz	(Kazakhstan) Vait Talgayev	(Kazakhstan) Dmitri Yevstigneyev	Nike	—
Tobol	(Russia) Robert Yevdokimov		Adidas	—

=== Foreign players ===
The number of foreign players is restricted to eight per KPL team. A team can use only five foreign players on the field in each game.

Club	Player 1	Player 2	Player 3	Player 4	Player 5	Player 6	Player 7	Player 8	Player 9	Player 10
Aktobe	(Austria) Tomáš Šimkovič	(Cameroon) Joseph Nane	(France) Jérémy Faug-Porret	(North Macedonia) **Muarem Muarem**	(North Macedonia) **Dušan Savić**	(Montenegro) Marko Obradović	(Serbia) Slobodan Simović	(Slovakia) Kristián Kolčák	(Ukraine) Oleksandr Volovyk	
Akzhayik	(Colombia) Jhoan Arenas	(Croatia) Denis Glavina	(Montenegro) Marko Đurović	(Montenegro) Jovan Nikolić	(Nigeria) **Michael Odibe**	(Paraguay) Freddy Coronel	(Serbia) Predrag Govedarica	(Serbia) Miroslav Lečić	(Ukraine) Kostyantyn Dudchenko	
Astana	(Belarus) **Ivan Mayewski**	(Belarus) **Igor Shitov**	(Bosnia and Herzegovina) **Marin Aničić**	(Bosnia and Herzegovina) **Srđan Grahovac**	(Democratic Republic of the Congo) **Junior Kabananga**	(Croatia) **Marin Tomasov**	(Ghana) **Patrick Twumasi**	(Hungary) **László Kleinheisler**	(Serbia) Đorđe Despotović	
Atyrau	(Croatia) Jure Obšivač	(Georgia (country)) **Vladimir Dvalishvili**	(Georgia (country)) **Ucha Lobjanidze**	(Serbia) Jovan Đokić	(Serbia) Novica Maksimović	(Serbia) Predrag Sikimić	(Uzbekistan) **Shavkat Salomov**	(Ukraine) **Rizvan Ablitarov**		
Irtysh	(Brazil) Rodrigo António	(Ivory Coast) Béko Fofana	(Moldova) **Igor Bugaiov**	(Portugal) Carlos Fonseca	(Serbia) Mario Maslać	(Serbia) Stefan Živković	(Serbia) Miloš Stamenković	(Ukraine) Vladyslav Ohirya		
Kairat	(Brazil) Isael	(Croatia) **Ivo Iličević**	(Hungary) **Ákos Elek**	(Ivory Coast) Gerard Gohou	(Norway) Chuma Anene	(Russia) **Andrey Arshavin**	(Serbia) Žarko Marković	(Spain) César Arzo	(Trinidad and Tobago) Sheldon Bateau	
Kaisar	(Burundi) **Saidi Ntibazonkiza**	(Cameroon) Abdel Lamanje	(Croatia) Ivan Graf	(Martinique) **Mathias Coureur**	(Serbia) Milan Bojović	(Sierra Leone) **John Kamara**	(Ukraine) Volodymyr Arzhanov	(Ivory Coast) Franck Dja Djédjé		
Okzhetpes	(Belgium) **Marvin Ogunjimi**	(Georgia (country)) **Gogita Gogua**	(Lithuania) **Georgas Freidgeimas**	(Russia) Aleksandr Kozlov	(Russia) Matvei Matveyev	(Serbia) Saša Stamenković	(Slovenia) Lucas Horvat	(Ukraine) Vitaliy Hoshkoderya		
Ordabasy	(Argentina) **Pablo Fontanello**	(Colombia) Roger Canas	(Bulgaria) **Preslav Yordanov**	(Croatia) Oliver Petrak	(Russia) Nikita Bocharov	(Senegal) Abdoulaye Diakate	(Serbia) Aleksandar Simčević	(Serbia) Srđan Vujaklija	(Ukraine) **Kyrylo Kovalchuk**	(Uzbekistan) **Alexander Geynrikh**
Shakhter	(Czech Republic) Jiří Valenta	(Czech Republic) Jakub Chleboun	(England) Korede Aiyegbusi	(Serbia) Marko Stanojević	(Serbia) Milan Stojanović	(Slovakia) Július Szöke	(Slovakia) Štefan Zošák			
Taraz	(Guinea) **Mohammed Diarra**	(Haiti) **Jean-Eudes Maurice**	(Montenegro) **Nemanja Mijušković**	(Russia) Andrei Gorbanets	(Russia) Yevgeni Shipitsin	(Tajikistan) **Davron Ergashev**	(Ukraine) Maksym Feshchuk	(Senegal) **Malick Mané**		
Tobol	(Bosnia and Herzegovina) **Amer Bekić**	(Albania) **Azdren Llullaku**	(Central African Republic) **Fernander Kassaï**	(Czech Republic) Egon Vuch	(Georgia (country)) **Nika Kvekveskiri**	(Lithuania) **Artūras Žulpa**	(North Macedonia) **Vanče Šikov**	(Ukraine) Dmytro Nepohodov		

In bold: Players that have been capped for their national team.

=== Managerial changes ===
Team	Outgoing manager	Manner of departure	Date of vacancy	Position in table	Incoming manager	Date of appointment
Aktobe	(Russia) Yuri Utkulbayev			Pre-season	(Ukraine) Ihor Rakhayev	
Atyrau	(Bulgaria) Stoycho Mladenov			Pre-season	(Croatia) Zoran Vulić	14 December 2016
Kaisar				Pre-season	(Bulgaria) Stoycho Mladenov	21 November 2016
Taraz	(Ukraine) Yuriy Maksymov			Pre-season	(Kazakhstan) Vait Talgayev	4 January 2017
Ordabasy	(Kazakhstan) Bakhtiyar Bayseitov			Pre-season	(Russia) Aleksei Petrushin	5 February 2017
Atyrau	(Croatia) Zoran Vulić	Resigned	11 April 2017	12th	(Russia) Sergei Pavlov	13 April 2017
Aktobe	(Ukraine) Ihor Rakhayev	Sacked	13 May 2017	12th	(Kazakhstan) Igor Prokhnitsky (caretaker)	13 May 2017
Okzhetpes	(Russia) Vladimir Mukhanov	Resigned	17 May 2017	8th	(Kazakhstan) Viktor Semenov (caretaker)	17 May 2017
Aktobe	(Kazakhstan) Igor Prokhnitsky	End of caretaker spell	24 May 2017	12th	(Russia) Vladimir Mukhanov	24 May 2017
Okzhetpes	(Kazakhstan) Viktor Semenov	End of caretaker spell	25 May 2017	9th	(Ukraine) Viktor Pasulko	25 May 2017
Shakhter Karagandy	(Russia) Aleksei Yeryomenko	Fired	29 May 2017	12th	(Lithuania) Saulius Širmelis	2 June 2017
Tobol	(Russia) Omari Tetradze	Resigned	27 June 2017	5th	(Russia) Robert Yevdokimov	7 July 2017
Kairat	(Georgia (country)) Kakhaber Tskhadadze	Resigned	21 July 2017	2nd	(Kazakhstan) Sergei Labodovsky (caretaker)	23 July 2017
Kairat	(Kazakhstan) Sergei Labodovsky (caretaker)	End of caretaker spell	26 July 2017	2nd	(Spain) Carlos Ferrer	26 July 2017
Irtysh Pavlodar	(Bulgaria) Dimitar Dimitrov	Resigned	9 August 2017	4th	(Kazakhstan) Sergei Klimov (caretaker)	10 August 2017
Irtysh Pavlodar	(Kazakhstan) Sergei Klimov (caretaker)	End of caretaker spell	17 August 2017	4th	(Ukraine) Vyacheslav Hroznyi	17 August 2017
Atyrau	(Russia) Sergei Pavlov	Resigned	21 September 2017	11th	(Kazakhstan) Kuanysh Kabdulov (caretaker)	21 September 2017

== League table ==
Pos	Team	Pld	W	D	L	GF	GA	GD	Pts	Qualification or relegation
1	Astana (C)	33	25	4	4	74	21	+53	79	Qualification for the Champions League first qualifying round
2	Kairat	33	23	9	1	75	28	+47	78	Qualification for the Europa League first qualifying round (Note: Kairat qualified for the Europa League first qualifying round by winning the 2017 Kazakhstan Cup.)
3	Ordabasy	33	18	4	11	44	37	+7	58	
4	Irtysh Pavlodar	33	12	12	9	35	32	+3	48	Qualification for the Europa League first qualifying round (Note: Ordabasy would have qualified too, but they failed to obtain a licence, so Tobol took their place.)
5	Tobol	33	12	11	10	36	26	+10	47	Qualification for the Europa League first qualifying round
6	Kaisar	33	11	9	13	30	36	−6	42	
7	Shakhter Karagandy	33	12	4	17	36	50	−14	40	
8	Atyrau (Note: Atyrau started the season with –9 points as a punishment for unpaid debts to former manager Zoran Filipović. On 24 April 2017, Atyrau had six points returned to after they cleared their debt to Filipović, with three points retained due to debts to Jonathas.)	33	10	8	15	34	54	−20	35	
9	Aktobe	33	8	9	16	38	46	−8	33	
10	Akzhayik (O)	33	7	9	17	29	47	−18	30	Qualification for the relegation play-offs
11	Taraz (Note: Taraz had six points deducted as a punishment for unpaid debts to former player Obiora Odita.) (R)	33	8	8	17	29	50	−21	26	Relegation to the Kazakhstan First Division
12	Okzhetpes (R)	33	7	3	23	28	61	−33	24	Relegation to the Kazakhstan First Division

Source: UEFA, Soccerway
Rules for classification: 1) Points; 2) Head-to-head points; 3) Head-to-head matches won; 4) Head-to-head goal difference; 5) Head-to-head goals scored; 6) Head-to-head away goals scored; 7) Goal difference; 8) Matches won; 9) Goals scored; 10) Away goals scored; 11) Draw.
(C) Champions; (O) Play-off winners; (R) Relegated

== Results ==
=== Games 1–22 ===
Home \ Away	AKT	AKZ	AST	ATY	IRT	KRT	KSR	OKZ	ORD	SHA	TAR	TOB
Aktobe	—	1–1	2–4	1–0	1–2	1–2	1–1	3–0	0–1	0–1	1–1	1–3
Akzhayik	2–2	—	0–2	2–2	0–1	0–1	1–0	1–1	1–2	3–1	2–2	1–0
Astana	3–0	3–1	—	4–0	2–0	1–1	2–0	3–0	1–0	4–1	4–0	2–0
Atyrau	2–0	2–0	0–1	—	0–1	2–1	1–0	2–1	2–2	3–3	1–3	1–0
Irtysh Pavlodar	1–3	2–1	1–1	1–1	—	3–3	1–0	0–0	0–1	1–2	5–2	0–1
Kairat	1–0	4–1	3–0	1–1	1–1	—	1–1	2–2	3–0	4–1	4–0	2–0
Kaisar	3–2	0–0	0–3	2–0	1–1	1–2	—	1–0	0–1	2–1	2–1	0–0
Okzhetpes	2–1	2–1	0–3	1–0	0–2	2–3	3–1	—	1–2	0–2	0–1	1–0
Ordabasy	2–1	3–0	3–0	1–1	0–1	0–2	1–0	2–1	—	1–0	3–0	1–2
Shakhter Karagandy	0–2	1–0	1–2	2–0	0–1	1–4	0–1	1–0	1–2	—	0–1	1–1
Taraz	1–1	0–0	0–1	1–2	2–0	0–0	2–1	0–1	2–1	0–0	—	1–0
Tobol	0–0	2–0	1–1	3–0	0–0	2–2	0–0	5–1	1–0	1–2	1–0	—

Source: Soccerway
Legend: Blue = home team win; Yellow = draw; Red = away team win.

=== Games 23–33 ===
Home \ Away	AKT	AKZ	AST	ATY	IRT	KRT	KSR	OKZ	ORD	SHA	TAR	TOB
Aktobe	—	—	0–3	—	—	—	0–1	—	2–0	2–0	—	1–0
Akzhayik	2–2	—	—	1–0	—	—	0–0	2–0	—	1–2	—	—
Astana	—	2–0	—	7–0	2–1	0–2	—	4–0	—	—	2–0	—
Atyrau	2–2	—	—	—	0–0	0–1	—	—	—	3–1	3–2	—
Irtysh Pavlodar	1–1	0–1	—	—	—	1–1	0–0	—	—	1–0	—	1–2
Kairat	3–2	2–1	—	—	—	—	3–1	—	5–1	3–1	—	2–0
Kaisar	—	—	1–4	4–1	—	—	—	2–1	1–1	—	—	1–0
Okzhetpes	0–2	—	—	1–2	1–2	0–1	—	—	—	—	2–1	—
Ordabasy	—	3–2	2–1	2–0	1–2	—	—	3–2	—	—	1–0	—
Shakhter Karagandy	—	—	0–1	—	—	—	2–1	2–1	2–1	—	—	1–1
Taraz	1–0	0–1	—	—	1–1	1–5	0–1	—	—	2–3	—	—
Tobol	—	2–0	1–1	2–0	—	—	—	4–1	0–0	—	1–1	—

Source: Soccerway
Legend: Blue = home team win; Yellow = draw; Red = away team win.

== Relegation play-offs ==
9 November 2017	Akzhayik	2–1	Makhtaaral	Astana
15:00 (UTC+6)	Dudchenko 45+1', 86'	Report	S.Chulagov 35'	Stadium: Astana Arena

== Statistics ==
=== Scoring ===
- First goal of the season: Aleksey Shchotkin for Tobol against Atyrau (8 March 2017)

=== Top scorers ===
As of matches played 28 October 2017

Rank	Player	Club	Goals
1	(Ivory Coast) Gerard Gohou	Kairat	24
2	(Democratic Republic of the Congo) Junior Kabananga	Astana	19
3	(Ghana) Patrick Twumasi	Astana	13
4	(Kazakhstan) Bauyrzhan Islamkhan	Kairat	11
5	(Serbia) Milan Stojanović	Shakhter Karagandy	10
5	(Kazakhstan) Aleksey Shchotkin	Tobol	10
7	(Belarus) Ihar Zyankovich	Aktobe	9
7	(Kazakhstan) Tanat Nusserbayev	Ordabasy	9
9	(Bosnia and Herzegovina) Srđan Grahovac	Astana	8
9	(Brazil) Isael	Kairat	8

=== Hat-tricks ===
Player	For	Against	Result	Date	Ref.
(Kazakhstan) Aleksey Shchotkin	Tobol	Atyrau	3–0	8 March 2017	
(Ivory Coast) Gerard Gohou	Kairat	Shakhter Karagandy	4–1	8 April 2017	
(Democratic Republic of the Congo) Junior Kabananga	Astana	Shakhter Karagandy	4–1	28 May 2017	
(Serbia) Milan Stojanović	Shakhter Karagandy	Taraz	3–2	21 October 2017	
(Czech Republic) Egon Vůch	Tobol	Okzhetpes	4–1	22 October 2017	

== Awards ==
=== Annual awards ===
Award	Winner	Club
Premier League Player of the Year	(Ivory Coast) Gerard Gohou	Kairat
Premier League Goalkeeper of the Year	(Kazakhstan) David Loriya	Irtysh
Premier League Young Player of the Year	(Kazakhstan) Bakhtiyar Zaynutdinov	Taraz
Premier League Manager of the Year	(Bulgaria) Stanimir Stoilov	Astana
Premier League Top Scorer	(Ivory Coast) Gerard Gohou	Kairat

=== Team of the Year ===
The Kazakhstan Premier League Team of the Year was selected by the Kazakhstan Professional Football League (PFLK) based on votes submitted by the head coaches of the league's clubs. The votes were analyzed, summed and combined into a single symbolic squad of 22 players.

Goalkeepers	Defenders	Midfielders	Forwards
(Kazakhstan) David Loriya (Kazakhstan) Nenad Erić	(Bosnia and Herzegovina) Marin Aničić (Spain) César Arzo (Kazakhstan) Yury Logvinenko (Argentina) Pablo Fontanello (Belarus) Igor Shitov (Kazakhstan) Abzal Beysebekov (Kazakhstan) Dmitry Shomko (Kazakhstan) Gafurzhan Suyumbayev	(Belarus) Ivan Mayewski (Kazakhstan) Islambek Kuat (Ghana) Patrick Twumasi (Brazil) Isael (Russia) Andrey Arshavin (Portugal) Carlos Fonseca	(Ivory Coast) Gerard Gohou (Democratic Republic of the Congo) Junior Kabananga (Kazakhstan) Aleksey Shchyotkin (Kazakhstan) Tanat Nuserbayev

== Attendances ==
#	Club	Average
1	Kairat	9,029
2	Aktobe	7,319
3	Astana	4,765
4	Ordabasy	4,306
5	Taraz	3,582
6	Tobol	3,479
7	Irtysh	3,400
8	Atyrau	3,375
9	Kaysar	2,534
10	Akzhaiyk	2,375
11	Shakhter	1,675
12	Okzhetpes	888
