= Oliver Petrak =

Croatian footballer (born 1991)

Personal information
- Full name: Oliver Petrak
- Date of birth: 6 February 1991 (age 35)
- Place of birth: Zagreb, Croatia
- Height: 1.85 m (6 ft 1 in)
- Positions: Defensive midfielder; central midfielder

Team information
- Current team: Sesvete
- Number: 13

Youth career
- 2003-2005: Zagreb
- 2005: Lokomotiva Zagreb
- 2006–2009: Dinamo Zagreb
- 2009–2010: Lokomotiva Zagreb

Senior career*
Years	Team	Apps	(Gls)
2010–2013	Lučko	65	(5)
2013–2014	Istra 1961	0	(0)
2014	→ Sesvete (loan)	13	(1)
2014–2017	Zrinjski	65	(9)
2017	Ordabasy	8	(0)
2018–2019	Korona Kielce	42	(0)
2019–2022	Lokomotiva Zagreb	45	(3)
2022	Krško	16	(2)
2023	Croatia Zmijavci	12	(1)
2023–	Sesvete	12	(1)

International career
2005	Croatia U14	2	(0)
2007	Croatia U16	7	(0)
- * Club domestic league appearances and goals as of 6 February 2024

Oliver Petrak (born 6 February 1991) is a Croatian professional footballer who plays for Croatian second tier outfit Sesvete.

== Career ==
=== Club ===
Petrak signed for FC Ordabasy in July 2017 on a one-year contract, but left the club at the end of the 2017 season.

On 29 June 2019, he joined Lokomotiva Zagreb.
