= Lucas Mario Horvat =

Slovenian footballer (born 1985)

Lucas Horvat
Personal information
- Full name: Lucas Mario Horvat
- Date of birth: 13 October 1985 (age 41)
- Place of birth: Buenos Aires, Argentina
- Height: 1.78 m (5 ft 10 in)
- Position: Midfielder

Team information
- Current team: SC Eibiswald
- Number: 9

Youth career
- Argentinos Juniors
- River Plate

Senior career*
Years	Team	Apps	(Gls)
2004–2006	Factor	29	(3)
2006	→ Drava Ptuj (loan)	12	(2)
2006–2009	Drava Ptuj	86	(5)
2009–2010	Interblock	31	(3)
2010–2012	Domžale	35	(6)
2012–2015	Baku	85	(3)
2015–2016	Domžale	47	(5)
2016–2017	Okzhetpes	27	(2)
2018–2022	Aluminij	72	(6)
2022–2023	FC Gamlitz	37	(1)
2023–	SC Eibiswald	8	(0)

International career
2006	Slovenia U21	1	(0)
- * Club domestic league appearances and goals as of 28 October 2023

Lucas Mario Horvat (born 13 October 1985), also known as Mario Lucas Horvat, is a footballer who plays as a midfielder for Austrian club SC Eibiswald. Born in Argentina, he represented Slovenia internationally.

== Club career ==
Before starting his professional career, Horvat went through the youth football selections of Argentinos Juniors and River Plate. After taking part in the 2004 football tournament for Slovenes living abroad, he signed his first contract with Factor, a team that was then playing in the Slovenian Second League. In the second half of the 2005–06 season, he was sent on loan to Drava Ptuj. After a successful performance during the loan period, he was offered and signed a four-year contract with the new team. Over the course of three seasons, Horvat made 86 league appearances and scored five goals for Drava. On 11 July 2009 he signed a two-year contract with Interblock.

In January 2012, Horvat signed a two-year contract with Baku of the Azerbaijan Premier League. In February 2015 Horvat returned to Domžale.

On 4 December 2016, Horvat signed a one-year contract with Kazakhstan Premier League side Okzhetpes for the 2017 season.

== Career statistics ==
=== Club ===
Appearances and goals by club, season and competition
Club	Season	League			National cup		Continental		Other		Total	
Club	Season	Division	Apps	Goals	Apps	Goals	Apps	Goals	Apps	Goals	Apps	Goals
Factor	2004–05	Slovenian Second League	18	3	2	0	—		—		20	3
Factor	2005–06	Slovenian Second League	11	0	0	0	—		—		11	0
Factor	Total		29	3	2	0	0	0	0	0	31	3
Drava Ptuj (loan)	2005–06	Slovenian PrvaLiga	12	2	0	0	—		—		12	2
Drava Ptuj	2006–07	Slovenian PrvaLiga	30	4	1	0	—		—		31	4
Drava Ptuj	2007–08	Slovenian PrvaLiga	33	1	1	0	—		—		34	1
Drava Ptuj	2008–09	Slovenian PrvaLiga	23	0	0	0	—		2 (Note: Appearance(s) in Slovenian PrvaLiga relegation play-offs)	0	25	0
Drava Ptuj	Total		86	5	2	0	0	0	2	0	90	5
Interblock	2009–10	Slovenian PrvaLiga	31	3	3	1	1	0	2	0	37	4
Domžale	2010–11	Slovenian PrvaLiga	16	4	3	1	—		—		19	5
Domžale	2011–12	Slovenian PrvaLiga	19	2	1	0	2	1	1 (Note: Appearance in Slovenian Supercup)	0	23	3
Domžale	Total		35	6	4	1	2	1	1	0	42	8
Baku	2011–12	Azerbaijan Premier League	13	0	4	1	—		—		17	1
Baku	2012–13	Azerbaijan Premier League	25	3	5	0	1	0	—		31	3
Baku	2013–14	Azerbaijan Premier League	34	0	3	0	—		—		37	0
Baku	2014–15	Azerbaijan Premier League	13	0	1	0	—		—		14	0
Baku	Total		85	3	13	1	1	0	0	0	99	4
Domžale	2014–15	Slovenian PrvaLiga	8	0	2	0	0	0	—		10	0
Domžale	2015–16	Slovenian PrvaLiga	23	2	4	0	2	0	—		29	2
Domžale	2016–17	Slovenian PrvaLiga	16	3	1	0	6	0	—		23	3
Domžale	Total		47	5	7	0	8	0	0	0	62	5
Okzhetpes	2017	Kazakhstan Premier League	27	2	1	0	—		—		28	2
Aluminij	2017–18	Slovenian PrvaLiga	8	3	1	0	—		—		9	3
Aluminij	2018–19	Slovenian PrvaLiga	31	2	5	1	—		—		36	3
Aluminij	2019–20	Slovenian PrvaLiga	19	0	2	0	—		—		21	0
Aluminij	2020–21	Slovenian PrvaLiga	14	1	2	0	—		—		16	1
Aluminij	2021–22	Slovenian PrvaLiga	0	0	0	0	—		—		0	0
Aluminij	Total		72	6	10	1	0	0	0	0	82	7
Career total			424	35	42	4	12	1	5	0	483	40

== Honours ==
Domžale

- Slovenian Cup: 2010–11
- Slovenian Supercup: 2011

Baku

- Azerbaijan Cup: 2011–12
