= Srđan Vujaklija =

Serbian footballer (born 1988)

Personal information
- Full name: Srđan Vujaklija
- Date of birth: 21 March 1988 (age 38)
- Place of birth: Novi Sad, SFR Yugoslavia
- Height: 1.89 m (6 ft 2 in)
- Position: Striker

Youth career
- Veternik

Senior career*
Years	Team	Apps	(Gls)
2005	Veternik		
2005–2009	Novi Sad	95	(13)
2010–2011	Spartak Subotica	24	(3)
2011–2012	Hajduk Kula	7	(1)
2012	→ Banat Zrenjanin (loan)	3	(1)
2012	Al Shabab Al Arabi Club		
2013–2015	Proleter Novi Sad	67	(26)
2015–2016	Borac Čačak	37	(15)
2017	Red Star Belgrade	8	(2)
2017	Ordabasy	7	(3)
2018	Gwangju	6	(1)
2018–2019	Proleter Novi Sad	20	(5)
2019–2020	Borac Banja Luka	17	(1)
2020–2021	Doxa Drama	5	(0)
2021	RoPS	15	(7)
2022–2023	RFK Novi Sad	30	(5)
2023-2024	Mladost GAT	13	(0)
2024	→ Kabel (loan)		
- * Club domestic league appearances and goals as of 20:53, 26 December 2023 (UTC)

Srđan Vujaklija (Serbian Cyrillic: Срђан Вујаклија; born 21 March 1988) is a Serbian retired footballer who played as a striker.

== Club career ==
=== Novi Sad ===
Born in Novi Sad, Vujaklija started his career with local low ranked club FK Veternik, later moved to Second League of Serbia and Montenegro and joined FK Novi Sad, where he spent the next 4 years.

He made 19 appearances and scored 2 goals for the first season in the club, after which Novi Sad was relegated to the Serbian League Vojvodina, but after one season, the club returned to the second tier league. Vujaklija participated in success with 6 goals on 30 matches.

For the 2007–08 season, Vujaklija scored 5 goals on 22 matches in the Serbian First League and was also declared as the man of the match 2 times, as the previous two seasons too. Later, for the next season and a half, Vujaklija played only 24 matches, without a goal.

=== Spartak Subotica ===
Vujaklija joined FK Spartak Subotica in the spring half of the 2009–10 season. For the first 6 months spent in the Serbian SuperLiga, he made 10 appearances, with only 1 start and without goals.

In the first half of the 2010–11 season, Vujaklija made 1 appearance, when he was substituted in from the bench, but he got the chance for a spring half usually as the first choice and scored 3 goals in 14 matches.

=== Hajduk Kula ===
After the episode with Spartak Subotica, Vujaklija stayed in the SuperLiga, signing with FK Hajduk Kula in the 2011–12 season.

Playing for Hajduk Kula, he made 7 league and 1 cup appearance and scored 1 goal.

==== Loan to Banat Zrenjanin ====
As the member of Hajduk Kula, Vujaklija was loaned to Serbian First League side FK Banat Zrenjanin. Although he played at only the first three matches, he scored 1 goal for Banat in a 5–3 defeat against FK Kolubara.

Previously, Vujaklija lost a cup match against Kolubara, playing with Hajduk Kula in the first half-season.

=== Proleter Novi Sad ===
Vujaklija joined FK Proleter Novi Sad in the beginning of 2013. Previously he played with Al Shabab Al Arabi Club Dubai in the United Arab Emirates for some period in 2012.

He started his first matches with Proleter Novi Sad as a back-up for Darko Drinić, but later coach Nenad Lalatović used both of them on the field. Vujaklija scored 8 goals until the end of the 2012–13 season.

Next season, he became the first choice for new coach, Zoran Marić, after Drinić left the club. He scored 12 goals in the 2013–14 season, but mostly in the first half as a result of cooperation with Mirko Ivanić.

In the summer of 2014, Vujaklija was on trial in FK Vojvodina as the best scorer of Proleter Novi Sad, but stayed with Proleter for one more season. Vujaklija made 25 First League matches and scored 6 goals in the 2014–15 season.

During the time he spent with the team from Slana Bara, Vujaklija also played 3 cup matches.

=== Borac Čačak ===
Vujaklija joined FK Borac Čačak in the summer of 2015, along with former coach of Proleter Novi Sad, Nenad Lalatović and former teammates Dušan Mićić and Aleksandar Tanasin.

Lalatović gave Vujaklija a chance as a first choice in attack. He scored his first goal for Borac in the second fixture of the SuperLiga, against FK Voždovac at the Voždovac Stadium. Later, Vujaklija was a scorer in matches against FK Mladost Lučani, FK Novi Pazar, Vojvodina, FK Metalac Gornji Milanovac and OFK Beograd, when Borac confirmed a 2nd position on the 2015–16 SuperLiga table.

In the next fixture match, against Red Star Belgrade, Vujaklija scored 2 goals and demonstrated his goal celebration with imitation of playing the violin. Before the cup match against Red Star, Miodrag Božović said in joking, how his team will answer Vujaklija with playing contrabass. Borac won that match with a 5–1 result and Vujaklija made 2 assists and scored 1 goal, after which he repeated the same goal celebration. In the meantime of two matches, Vujaklija also scored 2 goals, against Voždovac and FK Radnik Surdulica.

In a match against FK Javor Ivanjica, played on 6 December 2015, Vujaklija scored his 11th 2015–16 SuperLiga goal, and equated with Aleksandar Katai on the 1st place of the scorer list.

During the winter break off-season, the media circulated stories about his departure, and was published that he signed with Kazakhstan Premier League club FC Ordabasy, but he stayed with Borac and scored a new goal in the spring half premiere against FK Jagodina.

He was also a scorer in the quarter-final cup match against OFK Beograd. Vujaklija was declared as the best sportsman of the Moravica District for the year 2015.

=== Red Star Belgrade ===
In the summer of 2016, Vujaklija signed a preliminary contract with Red Star Belgrade, six months until the end of his contract with Borac Čačak, due to regulations. In the winter break off the 2016–17 season, he officially joined the new club, signing a two-year contract on 10 January 2017 with Red Star Belgrade.

He made his official debut for the club in the 25th fixture match of the 2016–17 Serbian SuperLiga season against Vojvodina, played on 8 March 2017. In the first match he started on the field, Vujaklija scored 2 goals in a 2–1 victory against Spartak Subotica on 1 April 2017.

After he was nominated for the man of the match, Vujaklija was also elected as the player of the week in the Serbian SuperLiga.

On 7 July 2017, he terminated the contract with Red Star Belgrade and left the club as a free agent.

=== Ordabasy ===
On 8 July 2017, Vujaklija signed with Kazakhstan Premier League side Ordabasy. He scored on his debut for the new club in a 1–0 win over FC Shakhter Karagandy the next day.

With the ending of September of the same year, Vujaklija scored in two successive matches against FC Irtysh Pavlodar and FC Akzhayik.

=== Gwangju ===
On 27 February 2018, it was announced Vujaklija moved to the K League 2 club Gwangju FC as a free player. He left Gwanju after only 6 months at the club in August 2018.

=== Return to Proleter Novi Sad ===
In August 2018, Vujaklija rejoined Proleter Novi Sad on a free transfer. He left Proleter after the end of the 2019–20 Serbian SuperLiga season.

=== Borac Banja Luka ===
On 11 July 2019, Vujaklija signed a one-year contract with Premier League of Bosnia and Herzegovina club FK Borac Banja Luka. He made his official debut for Borac on 20 July 2019, in a 0–0 away league draw against FK Željezničar Sarajevo. He scored his first official goal for Borac on 14 September 2019, in a 3–1 away league loss against FK Sloboda Tuzla. Vujaklija left the club in June 2020.

== Career statistics ==
=== Club ===
As of match played 23 February 2020.

Appearances and goals by club, season and competition
Club	Season	League			Cup		Continental		Other		Total	
Club	Season	Division	Apps	Goals	Apps	Goals	Apps	Goals	Apps	Goals	Apps	Goals
Novi Sad	2005–06	Serbian First League	19	2	—		—		—		19	2
Novi Sad	2006–07	Serbian League Vojvodina	30	6	—		—		—		30	6
Novi Sad	2007–08	Serbian First League	22	5	—		—		—		22	5
Novi Sad	2008–09	Serbian First League	16	0	—		—		—		16	0
Novi Sad	2009–10	Serbian First League	8	0	—		—		—		8	0
Novi Sad	Total		95	13	—		—		—		95	13
Spartak Subotica	2009–10	Serbian SuperLiga	10	0	—		—		—		10	0
Spartak Subotica	2010–11	Serbian SuperLiga	14	3	0	0	0	0	—		14	3
Spartak Subotica	2011–12	Serbian SuperLiga	0	0	0	0	—		—		0	0
Spartak Subotica	Total		24	3	0	0	0	0	—		24	3
Hajduk Kula	2011–12	Serbian SuperLiga	7	1	1	0	—		—		8	1
Banat Zrenjanin (loan)	2011–12	Serbian First League	3	1	—		—		—		3	1
Proleter Novi Sad	2012–13	Serbian First League	16	8	—		—		—		16	8
Proleter Novi Sad	2013–14	Serbian First League	26	12	1	0	—		—		27	12
Proleter Novi Sad	2014–15	Serbian First League	25	6	2	0	—		—		27	6
Proleter Novi Sad	Total		67	26	3	0	—		—		70	26
Borac Čačak	2015–16	Serbian SuperLiga	34	15	5	3	—		—		39	18
Borac Čačak	2016–17	Serbian SuperLiga	3	0	0	0	—		—		3	0
Borac Čačak	Total		37	15	5	3	—		—		42	18
Red Star Belgrade	2016–17	Serbian SuperLiga	8	2	2	0	—		—		10	2
Ordabasy	2017	Kazakhstan Premier League	7	3	—		—		—		7	3
Gwangju	2018	K League 2	6	1	0	0	—		—		6	1
Proleter Novi Sad	2018–19	Serbian SuperLiga	20	5	1	0	—		—		21	5
Borac Banja Luka	2019–20	Bosnian Premier League	17	1	1	2	—		—		18	3
Career total			291	71	13	5	0	0	—		304	76

== Honours ==
Novi Sad

- Serbian League Vojvodina: 2006–07
