= Alibek Buleshev =

Kazakhstani footballer

Personal information
- Full name: Alibek Bakhtiyarovich Buleshev
- Date of birth: 9 April 1981 (age 45)
- Place of birth: Taldykorgan, Kazakh SSR, Soviet Union
- Height: 1.75 m (5 ft 9 in)
- Position: Forward

Team information
- Current team: Okzhetpes
- Number: 32

Youth career
- FC Kairat

Senior career*
Years	Team	Apps	(Gls)
1999	Zhetysu	14	(2)
2000–2006	Kairat	156	(66)
2007	Aktobe	16	(1)
2007–2008	Kairat	38	(11)
2009	Ordabasy	6	(2)
2009	Atyrau	9	(1)
2010	Taraz	11	(1)
2011–2012	Sunkar	38	(21)
2013–2016	Okzhetpes	105	(50)
2017	Ordabasy	4	(0)
2017–	Okzhetpes	14	(2)

International career
2002–2004	Kazakhstan	9	(0)
- * Club domestic league appearances and goals as of 8 November 2017

Alibek Bakhtiyarovich Buleshev (Kazakh: Әлібек Бахтиярұлы Бөлешев, romanized: Älıbek Baqtiarūly Böleşev; born 9 April 1981) is a Kazakh football forward who plays for Okzhetpes. He is the all-time top scorer of Kairat.

== Career ==
=== Club ===
On 30 September 2016, Buleshev had his contract with FC Okzhetpes terminated by mutual consent.

In June 2017 Buleshev left FC Ordabasy, to rejoin Okzhetpes

== Career statistics ==
=== Club ===
As of match played 5 November 2017

Club	Season	League			National Cup		Continental		Other		Total	
Club	Season	Division	Apps	Goals	Apps	Goals	Apps	Goals	Apps	Goals	Apps	Goals
Zhetysu	1999	Kazakhstan Premier League	14	2			-		-		14	2
Kairat	2000	Kazakhstan Premier League	7	2			-		-		7	2
Kairat	2001	Kazakhstan Premier League	29	7			-		-		29	7
Kairat	2002	Kazakhstan Premier League	27	13			2	0	-		29	13
Kairat	2003	Kazakhstan Premier League	23	13			-		-		23	13
Kairat	2004	Kazakhstan Premier League	36	14			-		-		36	14
Kairat	2005	Kazakhstan Premier League	11	7			0	0	-		11	7
Kairat	2006	Kazakhstan Premier League	23	10			1	1	-		24	11
Kairat	Total		156	66			3	1	-	-	159	67
Aktobe	2007	Kazakhstan Premier League	16	1			0	0	-		16	1
Kairat	2007	Kazakhstan Premier League	15	4			-		-		15	4
Kairat	2008	Kazakhstan Premier League	23	7			-		-		23	7
Kairat	Total		38	11			-	-	-	-	38	11
Ordabasy	2009	Kazakhstan Premier League	6	2			-		-		6	2
Atyrau	2009	Kazakhstan Premier League	9	1			-		-		9	1
Taraz	2010	Kazakhstan Premier League	11	1			-		-		11	1
Sunkar	2011	Kazakhstan First Division	24	21			-		-		24	21
Sunkar	2012	Kazakhstan Premier League	14	0			-		-		14	0
Sunkar	Total		38	21			-	-	-	-	38	21
Okzhetpes	2013	Kazakhstan First Division	27	14			-		-		27	14
Okzhetpes	2014	Kazakhstan First Division	26	22			-		-		26	22
Okzhetpes	2015	Kazakhstan Premier League	29	8	1	0	-		-		30	8
Okzhetpes	2016	Kazakhstan Premier League	23	6	1	0	-		-		24	6
Okzhetpes	Total		105	50	2	0	-	-	-	-	107	50
Ordabasy	2017	Kazakhstan Premier League	4	0	3	0	-		-		7	0
Okzhetpes	2017	Kazakhstan Premier League	14	2	0	0	-		-		14	2
Career total			421	157	5	0	3	1	0	0	429	158

=== International ===
Kazakhstan national team
Year	Apps	Goals
2002	2	0
2003	1	0
2004	6	0
Total	9	0

== Honours ==
Kairat

- Kazakhstan Premier League (1): 2004
- Kazakhstan Cup (3): 1999–00, 2001, 2003

Aktobe

- Kazakhstan Premier League (1): 2007,

Atyrau

- Kazakhstan Cup (1): 2009
