= Matvei Matveyev =

Russian footballer

Personal information
- Full name: Matvei Viktorovich Matveyev
- Date of birth: 9 April 1993 (age 33)
- Height: 1.82 m (6 ft 0 in)
- Position: Defender

Senior career*
Years	Team	Apps	(Gls)
2012–2014	KAMAZ Naberezhnye Chelny	46	(0)
2014–2015	MITOS Novocherkassk	43	(2)
2016–2017	Volga Tver	26	(1)
2017	Okzhetpes	2	(0)
2019–2020	Energiya Shatura		
2020	Zvezda Lyubertsy		
2020–2021	Yegoryevsk		
2021	Orsha	21	(0)
- * Club domestic league appearances and goals

Matvei Viktorovich Matveyev (Russian: Матвей Викторович Матвеев; born 9 April 1993) is a Russian former football defender.

== Club career ==
Matveyev made his debut in the Russian Second Division for FC KAMAZ Naberezhnye Chelny on 21 July 2012 in a game against FC Spartak Yoshkar-Ola.
