= Vitaliy Hoshkoderya =

Ukrainian footballer

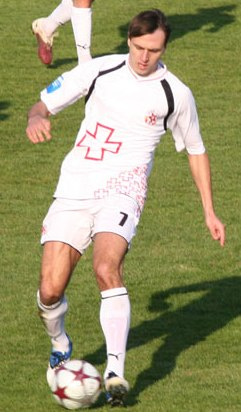

Personal information
- Full name: Vitaliy Valeriyovych Hoshkoderya
- Date of birth: 8 January 1988 (age 38)
- Place of birth: Donetsk, Ukrainian SSR
- Height: 1.84 m (6 ft 1/2 in)
- Position: Midfielder

Team information
- Current team: FSC Mariupol
- Number: 9

Youth career
- 2001–2004: Shakhtar Donetsk

Senior career*
Years	Team	Apps	(Gls)
2004–2011	Shakhtar Donetsk	0	(0)
2004–2008	→ Shakhtar-3 Donetsk	41	(3)
2009	→ Olimpik Donetsk (loan)	12	(0)
2009–2010	→ Volyn Lutsk (loan)	51	(1)
2011–2013	Kryvbas Kryvyi Rih	4	(0)
2012–2013	→ Naftovyk-Ukrnafta (loan)	1	(0)
2013–2014	Volyn Lutsk	15	(0)
2015–2017	Olimpik Donetsk	56	(1)
2017–2018	Okzhetpes	45	(2)
2019	Chornomorets Odesa	25	(3)
2020	Olimpik Donetsk	2	(0)
2020	Metalist 1925 Kharkiv	12	(0)
2021	Okzhetpes	20	(1)
2023–	FSC Mariupol	15	(0)

International career
2005	Ukraine-17	6	(0)
2005–2006	Ukraine-18	5	(0)
2007	Ukraine-19	1	(0)
- * Club domestic league appearances and goals as of 19 June 2024

Vitaliy Hoshkoderya (Ukrainian: Віталій Валерійович Гошкодеря, born 8 January 1988) is a professional Ukrainian footballer, who plays as a midfielder for FSC Mariupol.

He is a son of Valeriy Hoshkoderya.

== Career ==
He was born in Donetsk, Ukrainian SSR, and is a product of FC Shakhtar Donetsk training academy. His father Valeriy Hoshkoderya is a retired Shakhtar Donetsk player.

He was loaned to Volyn Lutsk in the Ukrainian Premier League from 30 August 2010.
