= Serge Bando N'Gambé =

French football player (born 1988)

Personal information
- Date of birth: 11 May 1988 (age 38)
- Place of birth: Cameroon
- Positions: Midfielder; forward

Senior career*
Years	Team	Apps	(Gls)
- Olympique Saint-Quentin
2009-2011	Jura Sud Foot	60	(14)
2011-2014	FC Montceau Bourgogne	63+	(15+)
2014-2016	FC Villefranche	37	(11)
2016-2017	FC Okzhetpes	28	(9)
2017	FC Irtysh Pavlodar	14	(0)
2017=2019	JA Drancy	56	(11)
2019-	FC Fleury 91	11	(0)
- * Club domestic league appearances and goals

Serge Bando N'Gambé (born 11 May 1988) is a French footballer who now plays for Fleury 91 in his home country.

== Career ==
Bando N'Gambé started his senior career with Olympique Saint-Quentin. In 2016, he signed for Okzhetpes in the Kazakhstan Premier League, where he made thirty appearances and scored nine goals. After that, he played for Kazakh club Irtysh Pavlodar, and French clubs JA Drancy and Fleury 91, where he now plays.
