= Kyrylo Kovalchuk =

Ukrainian footballer

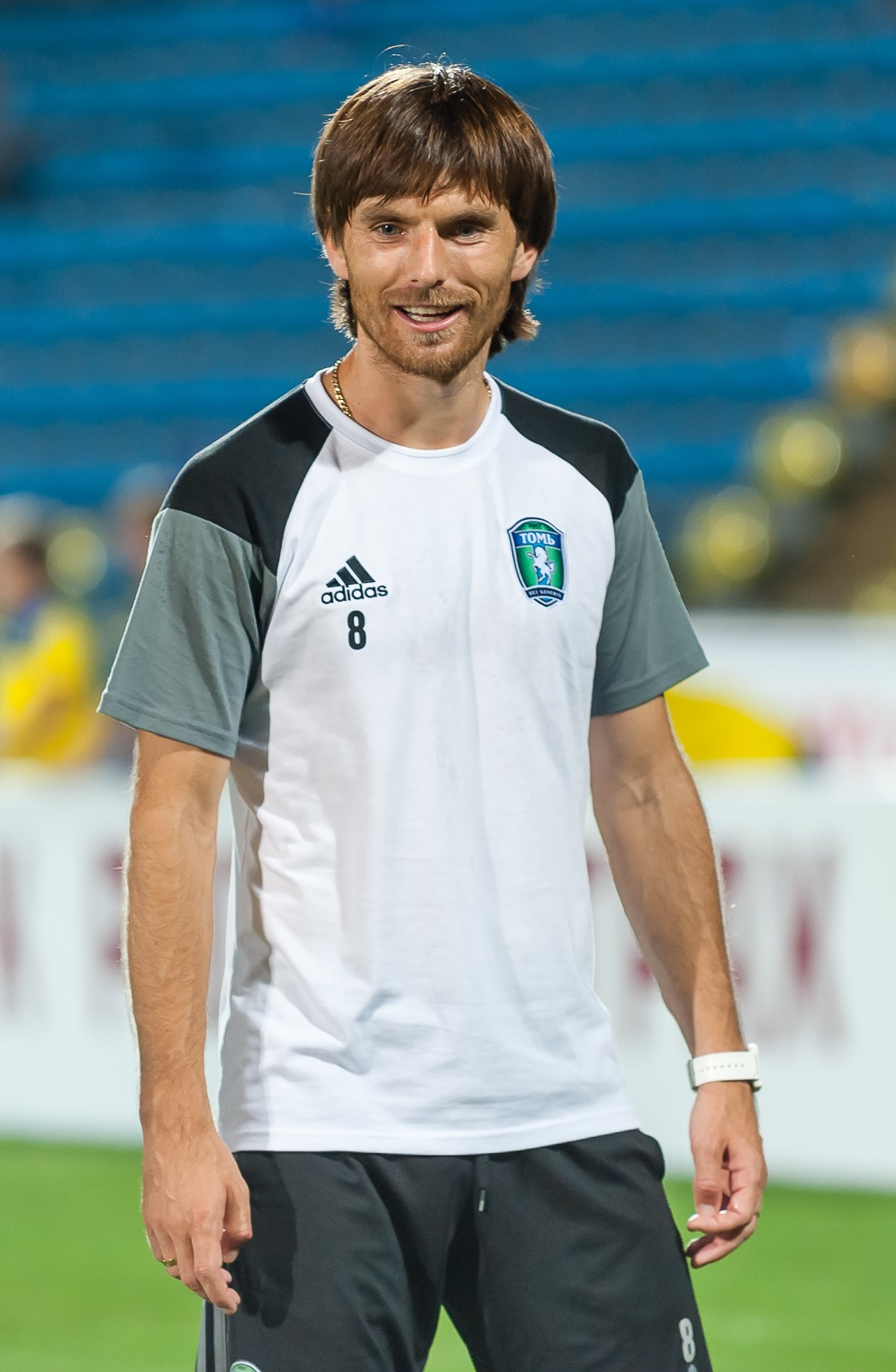
- Kovalchuk with Tom Tomsk in 2016

Personal information
- Full name: Kyrylo Serhiiovych Kovalchuk
- Date of birth: 11 June 1986 (age 40)
- Place of birth: Biliaivka, Ukrainian SSR, Soviet Union
- Height: 1.84 m (6 ft 0 in)
- Position: Midfielder

Senior career*
Years	Team	Apps	(Gls)
2003–2004	Dnipro-2 Dnipropetrovsk	22	(0)
2006–2007	Zimbru Chişinău	22	(4)
2008	→ Tavriya Simferopol (loan)	3	(0)
2008	Zimbru Chişinău	17	(3)
2009–2012	Tom Tomsk	35	(3)
2011	→ Chornomorets Odesa (loan)	14	(1)
2012–2015	Chornomorets Odesa	50	(1)
2015	Metalist Kharkiv	25	(0)
2016	Karşıyaka	7	(0)
2016	Tom Tomsk	11	(0)
2017–2019	Ordabasy	81	(5)
Total		287	(17)

International career
2014	Ukraine	4	(0)
- * Club domestic league appearances and goals

Kyrylo Kovalchuk (Ukrainian: Кирило Сергійович Ковальчук; Romanian: Chiril Covalciuc; born 11 June 1986) is a Ukrainian former professional footballer.

== Career ==
Kovalchuk made his debut in the Russian Premier League for FC Tom Tomsk on 19 July 2009 in a game against FC Khimki.

In February 2017, Kovalchuk signed for Kazakhstan Premier League side Ordabasy.

Moldovan Serghei Covalciuc, also a footballer who played for Chornomorets, is his elder brother.
