= Igor Yurin =

Kazakhstani footballer

Personal information
- Full name: Igor Yurin
- Date of birth: 3 July 1982 (age 44)
- Place of birth: Almaty, Kazakhstan
- Height: 1.71 m (5 ft 7 1/2 in)
- Position: Midfielder

Senior career*
Years	Team	Apps	(Gls)
2001	Shakhter Karagandy	9	(2)
2002	Atyrau	21	(3)
2003	Zhenis Astana	32	(4)
2004	Ekibastuzets	34	(3)
2005–2008	Tobol	83	(10)
2009	Irtysh Pavlodar	26	(2)
2010–2011	Tobol	43	(5)
2012–2014	Irtysh Pavlodar	80	(13)
2015	Tobol	28	(4)
2016–2017	Okzhetpes	54	(2)
2018	Aktobe	5	(0)
2018	Shakhter Karagandy	5	(0)

International career^{‡}
2013–	Kazakhstan	2	(0)
- * Club domestic league appearances and goals as of 19 November 2018 ‡ National team caps and goals as of 3 May 2016

Igor Yurin is a Kazakh football player. He has made two appearances for the Kazakhstan national football team.
