= 2014 FC Irtysh Pavlodar season =

Irtysh
2014 season
- Chairman: Roman Skljar
- Manager: Talgat Baisufinov (until 17 February 2014); Tarmo Rüütli (17 February - 2 May 2014 ) Oirats Saduova (from 2 May - 27 October 2014); Dmitri Cheryshev (from 27 October 2014)
- Stadium: Munaishy Stadium
- Kazakhstan Premier League: 10th
- Kazakhstan Cup: Quarter-final vs Shakhter Karagandy
- Top goalscorer: League: (11); Kostyantyn Dudchenko; All: (11); Kostyantyn Dudchenko
Home colours	Away colours

In 2014 FC Irtysh Pavlodar played their 23rd successive season in the Kazakhstan Premier League, the highest tier of association football in Kazakhstan. Irtysh finished the season in 10th position and reached the Quarter-finals of the Kazakhstan Cup, where they lost to Shakhter Karagandy.

== Season events ==
On 2 May Tarmo Rüütli was fired by the club. On 27 October, Dmitri Cheryshev was appointed as the club's manager on a two-year contract.

== Squad ==
As of 18 October 2014 Note: Flags indicate national team as defined under FIFA eligibility rules; some limited exceptions apply. Players may hold more than one non-FIFA nationality.

No.	Pos.	Nation	Player
3	DF	KAZ	Vladislav Chernyshov
4	DF	MNE	Miodrag Džudović
7	MF	TKM	Arslanmyrat Amanow
8	MF	KAZ	Evgeniy Averchenko
9	FW	KAZ	Kuanysh Begalyn
11	MF	KGZ	Sergei Ivanov
13	MF	KAZ	Alibek Ayaganov
14	MF	KAZ	Igor Yurin
17	FW	KAZ	Altynbek Dauletkhanov
18	DF	KAZ	Renat Bayanov
19	DF	KAZ	Grigori Sartakov
20	MF	KAZ	Abylaykhan Totay
21	GK	KAZ	Nikita Kalmykov
22	MF	KAZ	Aleksandr Andreev
23	DF	KAZ	Zakhar Korobov

No.	Pos.	Nation	Player
24	DF	MDA	Simeon Bulgaru
25	DF	KAZ	Ihor Chuchman
26	MF	KAZ	Ruslan Akhmetdinov
27	MF	KAZ	Elvin Allayarov
30	FW	UKR	Kostyantyn Dudchenko
33	GK	KAZ	Vyacheslav Kotlyar
39	DF	KAZ	Dmitriy Shevchenko
40	GK	KAZ	Mikhail Golubnichi
44	DF	KAZ	Vassiliy Zhukov
50	MF	UKR	Rinar Valeyev
52	MF	KAZ	Rustem Kuanyshev
60	DF	BUL	Orlin Starokin
77	MF	RUS	Almir Mukhutdinov
95	MF	KAZ	Vladimir Vomenko
98	MF	MNE	Igor Burzanović

== Transfers ==
=== Winter ===
In: Note: Flags indicate national team as defined under FIFA eligibility rules; some limited exceptions apply. Players may hold more than one non-FIFA nationality.

No.	Pos.	Nation	Player
4	DF	MNE	Miodrag Džudović (from (Russia) Spartak Nalchik)
7	MF	TKM	Arslanmyrat Amanow (from (Turkmenistan) HTTU)
15	DF	CZE	Jakub Chleboun (from (Kazakhstan) Akzhayik)
19	DF	KAZ	Grigori Sartakov (from (Kazakhstan) Spartak Semey)
23	DF	KAZ	Zakhar Korobov (from (Kazakhstan) Zhetysu)
30	FW	UKR	Kostyantyn Dudchenko (from (Russia) Shinnik)
98	MF	MNE	Igor Burzanović (from (Montenegro) Budućnost Podgorica)
—	FW	KAZ	Timur Baizhanov (from (Kazakhstan) Kairat)

Out: Note: Flags indicate national team as defined under FIFA eligibility rules; some limited exceptions apply. Players may hold more than one non-FIFA nationality.

No.	Pos.	Nation	Player
4	MF	BLR	Alyaksandr Kulchy (Retired)
7	MF	KAZ	Pavel Shabalin (to (Kazakhstan) Aktobe)
8	DF	MLI	Mamoutou Coulibaly (to (Kazakhstan) Kaisar)
9	FW	RUS	Sergei Strukov (to (Kazakhstan) Kaisar)
15	DF	KAZ	Dmitri Shomko (to (Kazakhstan) Astana)
16	DF	KAZ	Timur Khalmuratov
22	DF	KAZ	Gafurzhan Suyumbayev (to (Kazakhstan) Ordabasy)
25	DF	CZE	Štěpán Kučera (to (Kazakhstan) Tobol)
87	MF	UZB	Kamoliddin Murzoev (to (Kazakhstan) Shakhter Karagandy)

=== Summer ===
In: Note: Flags indicate national team as defined under FIFA eligibility rules; some limited exceptions apply. Players may hold more than one non-FIFA nationality.

No.	Pos.	Nation	Player
24	DF	MDA	Simeon Bulgaru (from (Russia) Volga Nizhny Novgorod)
50	MF	UKR	Rinar Valeyev (from (Ukraine) Chornomorets Odesa)
60	DF	BUL	Orlin Starokin (from (Bulgaria) Levski Sofia)

Out: Note: Flags indicate national team as defined under FIFA eligibility rules; some limited exceptions apply. Players may hold more than one non-FIFA nationality.

No.	Pos.	Nation	Player
1	GK	SRB	Nemanja Džodžo
2	DF	KAZ	Bakdaulet Kozhabayev (to (Kazakhstan) Ordabasy)
5	MF	SRB	Predrag Govedarica (loan to (Serbia) Napredak Kruševac)
6	MF	KAZ	Anton Chichulin (to (Turkey) Giresunspor)
10	MF	UZB	Ulugbek Bakayev (to (Uzbekistan) Buxoro)
15	DF	CZE	Jakub Chleboun (to (Czech Republic) Hradec Králové)
—	FW	KAZ	Timur Baizhanov (to (Kazakhstan) Ekibastuz)

== Competitions ==
=== Kazakhstan Premier League ===
==== First round ====
===== Results summary =====
Overall								Home						Away					
Pld	W	D	L	GF	GA	GD	Pts	W	D	L	GF	GA	GD	W	D	L	GF	GA	GD
22	6	6	10	28	35	−7	24	5	2	4	16	11	+5	1	4	6	12	24	−12

Last updated: 15 January 2015.
Source: Soccerway

===== Results by round =====
Round	1	2	3	4	5	6	7	8	9	10	11	12	13	14	15	16	17	18	19	20	21	22
Ground																						
Result																						
Position																						

Source: Soccerway
A = Away; H = Home; W = Win; D = Draw; L = Loss

===== Results =====
15 March 2014 1	Irtysh	1 – 0	Shakhter Karagandy	Pavlodar
15:00 (UTC+6)	Bakayev (yellow card) 25'; Z.Korobov (yellow card) 28'; Averchenko 32'; Burzanović (yellow card) 74'; Ivanov (yellow card) 81'	Summary	Vičius (yellow card) 62'; Paryvaew (yellow card) 84'	Stadium: Central Stadium; Attendance: 4,500; Referee: Marat Iskakov

22 March 2014 2	Spartak Semey	0 – 0	Irtysh	Semey
13:00 (UTC+6)	Samchenko (yellow card) 17'	Summary		Stadium: Spartak Stadium; Attendance: 1,200; Referee: Akmalkhan Kholmatov

29 March 2014 3	Irtysh	0 – 1	Atyrau	Pavlodar
14:00 (UTC+6)	Mukhutdinov (yellow card) 20'; Govedarica (yellow card) 55'; Bakayev (yellow card) 88'	Summary	Trifunović 12'; Rudzik (yellow card) 72'; E.Kostrub (yellow card) 82'	Stadium: Central Stadium; Attendance: 4,500; Referee: Igor Chesnokov

5 April 2014 4	Zhetysu	0 – 0	Irtysh	Taldykorgan
13:00 (UTC+6)	K.Zarechny (yellow card) 38'	Summary	Z.Korobov (yellow card) 11'; Mukhutdinov (yellow card) 24'; Džudović (yellow card) 42'; Burzanović (yellow card) 66'	Stadium: Zhetysu Stadium; Attendance: 3,000; Referee: Denis Tevyashov

9 April 2014 5	Irtysh	2 – 0	Ordabasy	Pavlodar
18:00 (UTC+6)	Chleboun (yellow card) 6'; Burzanović 13', 17'; Mukhutdinov (yellow card) 16'; Bakayev (yellow card) 70'	Summary	Mwesigwa (yellow card) 42'	Stadium: Central Stadium; Attendance: 3,200; Referee: Anatolyi Vishnichenko

13 April 2014 6	Kaisar	4 – 2	Irtysh	Kyzylorda
17:00 (UTC+6)	Savić 20' (pen.), 67'; Klein (yellow card) 27'; Strukov 42'; Zemlianukhin 48'	Summary	I.Yurin 6'; K.Begalyn 27'; Z.Korobov (yellow card) 42'	Stadium: Gany Muratbayev Stadium; Attendance: 3,800; Referee: Ruslan Duzmambetov

19 April 2014 7	Irtysh	3 – 4	Astana	Pavlodar
15:00 (UTC+6)	Džudović 16'; Bakayev 28', 45' (pen.) (yellow card) 60' (yellow-red card) 68'; Chleboun (yellow card) 34'; Amanow (yellow card) 82'	Summary	Nusserbayev 18'; Aničić (yellow card) 25' (yellow-red card) 45'; Cañas (yellow card) 31'; Shomko (yellow card) 31'; Kurdov (yellow card) 31' (goal) 45+1', 56', 75'	Stadium: Central Stadium; Attendance: 4,500; Referee: Aleksandr Gauzer

27 April 2014 8	Kairat	2 – 1	Irtysh	Almaty
18:00 (UTC+6)	E.Kuantayev 39'; A.Darabayev 41'	Summary	Mukhutdinov (yellow card) 16'; Govedarica (yellow card) 57' (goal) 89'	Stadium: Central Stadium; Attendance: 5,500; Referee: Askhat Abdanbayev

1 May 2014 9	Irtysh	0 – 3	Tobol	Pavlodar
18:00 (UTC+6)	Burzanović (yellow card) 30' (yellow-red card) 50'; A.Ayaganov (yellow card) 33'; Sartakov (yellow card) 65'	Summary	Zhumaskaliyev 10'; Jeslínek 29', 53'; Bogdanov (yellow card) 35'	Stadium: Central Stadium; Attendance: 4,000; Referee: Bolat Karlibayev

6 May 2014 10	Irtysh	2 – 0	Taraz	Pavlodar
18:00 (UTC+6)	Govedarica (yellow card) 11'; Dudchenko 19'; Bakayev 73'	Summary		Stadium: Central Stadium; Attendance: 2,500; Referee: Timur Kumashev

10 May 2014 11	Aktobe	3 – 0	Irtysh	Aktobe
19:00 (UTC+6)	Khairullin (yellow card) 53' (goal) 69'; Geynrikh 83'; Pizzelli 83' (pen.)	Summary		Stadium: Central Stadium; Attendance: 3,000; Referee: Igor Chesnokov

18 May 2014 12	Irtysh	5 – 0	Spartak Semey	Pavlodar
17:00 (UTC+6)	I.Yurin 13'; Dudchenko 21'; Chichulin 38' (pen.); A.Ayaganov 41'; Z.Korobov (yellow card) 50' (goal) 90'	Summary	Azovskiy (red card) 38'; Dyulgerov (yellow card) 70'	Stadium: Central Stadium; Attendance: 2,000; Referee: Aleksandr Aliyev

24 May 2014 13	Atyrau	0 – 1	Irtysh	Atyrau
19:00 (UTC+6)		Summary	Chuchman (yellow card) 11'; Dudchenko 35'; A.Ayaganov (yellow card) 49'; Bakayev (yellow card) 64'; Chernyshov (yellow card) 86'; Amanow (yellow card) 87'	Stadium: Munaishy Stadium; Attendance: 2,500; Referee: Artyom Kuchin

28 May 2014 14	Irtysh	1 – 0	Zhetysu	Pavlodar
19:00 (UTC+6)	Dudchenko 61'	Summary		Stadium: Central Stadium; Attendance: 2,500; Referee: Bagdat Abdullaev

1 June 2014 15	Ordabasy	2 – 1	Irtysh	Shymkent
18:00 (UTC+6)	Ashirbekov 31'; Freire 81' (yellow card) 81'; Y.Tungyshbayev (yellow card) 82'	Summary	A.Ayaganov 35'; Mukhutdinov (yellow card) 37'; Chernyshov (yellow card) 61'; Dudchenko (yellow card) 77'	Stadium: Kazhimukan Munaitpasov Stadium; Attendance: 5,000; Referee: Bolat Karlibayev

14 June 2014 16	Irtysh	1 – 1	Kaisar	Pavlodar
20:00 (UTC+6)	P.Govedarica (yellow card) 4'; Dudchenko 38'; Chernyshov (yellow card) 73' (yellow-red card) 90+1'	Summary	N.Kunov (yellow card) 32'; R.Rozybakiev 40'; Coulibaly (yellow card) 74'	Stadium: Central Stadium; Attendance: 2,500; Referee: Ruslan Duzmambetov

22 June 2014 17	Astana	5 – 3	Irtysh	Astana
17:00 (UTC+6)	Kéthévoama 5'; Cícero 17', 62'; Kojašević 32'; Shomko (yellow card) 66'; Dzholchiev 90+1'	Summary	Bakayev 23'; Dudchenko 31'; A.Totay 47'; Starokin (yellow card) 61'	Stadium: Astana Arena; Attendance: 1,500; Referee: Artyom Kuchin

27 June 2014 18	Irtysh	0 – 1	Kairat	Pavlodar
18:30 (UTC+6)	Bulgaru (yellow card) 84'	Summary	Islamkhan (yellow card) 55'; B.Baytana 62'	Stadium: Central Stadium; Attendance: 2,000; Referee: Anatolyi Vishnichenko

6 July 2014 19	Tobol	1 – 1	Irtysh	Kostanay
18:00 (UTC+6)	Kučera (yellow card) 14'; R.Aslan (yellow card) 21'; Kušnír 23'; Jeslínek (yellow card) 88'	Summary	Bakayev (yellow card) 14'; Mukhutdinov (yellow card) 23'; Dudchenko 59'; Chuchman (yellow card) 63'; Burzanović (yellow card) 88'; A.Totay (red card) 89'	Stadium: Central Stadium; Attendance: 4,000; Referee: Aydin Rakhimbayev

12 July 2014 20	Taraz	5 – 1	Irtysh	Taraz
18:00 (UTC+6)	Tleshev 16', 40'; D.Ubbink (yellow card) 45+1' (goal) 80'; O.Nedashkovsky (yellow card) 65'; Z.Kozhamberdy 74'; O.Yarovenko 90+1'	Summary	Mukhutdinov 36' (yellow card) 45+1'; A.Ayaganov (yellow card) 52'; Chichulin (yellow card) 79'; Starokin (yellow card) 90'	Stadium: Central Stadium; Attendance: 1,100; Referee: Denis Izmailov

26 July 2014 21	Irtysh	1 – 1	Aktobe	Pavlodar
19:00 (UTC+6)	Dudchenko 26'; Chuchman (yellow card) 29'; Burzanović (yellow card) 59'	Summary	A.Tagybergen (yellow card) 11'; Kapadze (yellow card) 61'; Anderson Mineiro 79'	Stadium: Pavlodar Central Stadium; Attendance: 2,200; Referee: Aleksandr Gauzer

3 August 2014 22	Shakhter Karagandy	2 – 2	Irtysh	Karaganda
16:30 (UTC+6)	Baizhanov (yellow card) 31'; Simčević (yellow card) 67'; Topcagić 82'; Vičius 86'; Maslo (yellow card) 90'; Finonchenko (yellow card) 90+1'	Summary	Dudchenko 46', 79'; Mukhutdinov (yellow card) 67'; Amanow (yellow card) 81'	Stadium: Shakhter Stadium; Attendance: 3,000; Referee: Igor Chesnokov

===== League table =====
Pos	Team	Pld	W	D	L	GF	GA	GD	Pts	Qualification
7	Zhetysu	22	7	6	9	15	18	−3	27	Qualification for the relegation round
8	Tobol	22	6	8	8	22	29	−7	26	Qualification for the relegation round
9	Irtysh Pavlodar	22	6	6	10	28	35	−7	24 (Note: ATY 0–1 IRT; IRT 0-1 ATY)	Qualification for the relegation round
10	Atyrau	22	6	6	10	19	27	−8	24	Qualification for the relegation round
11	Taraz	22	5	4	13	21	34	−13	19	Qualification for the relegation round

Source: Soccerway (in Russian)
Rules for classification: 1st points;
Two team tiebreak: 1st overall wins; 2nd head-to-head record; 3rd goals difference; 4th goals scored; 5th away goals scored;
Multiple teams tiebreak: 1st overall wins; 2nd goals difference; 3rd goals scored; 4th away goals scored

==== Relegation Round ====
===== Results summary =====
Overall								Home						Away					
Pld	W	D	L	GF	GA	GD	Pts	W	D	L	GF	GA	GD	W	D	L	GF	GA	GD
10	3	4	3	11	9	+2	13	2	3	0	7	4	+3	1	1	3	4	5	−1

Last updated: 15 January 2015.
Source: Soccerway

===== Results =====
23 August 2014 1	Irtysh	1 – 1	Zhetysu	Pavlodar
17:00 (UTC+6)	Chuchman (yellow card) 76'; Burzanović 89'	Summary	R.Sariyev (yellow card) 24'; R.Esatov 34'; S.Sariyev (yellow card) 46' (yellow-red card) 59'; Goa (yellow card) 90+3'; A.Pasechenko (yellow card) 90+4' (yellow-red card) 90+4'	Stadium: Central Stadium; Attendance: 1,500; Referee: Anatolyi Vishnichenko

29 August 2014 2	Atyrau	2 – 1	Irtysh	Atyrau
18:30 (UTC+6)	Adiyiah 43'; Trifunović 51' (pen.)	Summary	Ivanov (yellow card) 9'; A.Ayaganov (yellow card) 50'; Z.Korobov (yellow card) 70'; Burzanović 78'	Stadium: Munaishy Stadium; Attendance: 1,500; Referee: Denis Izmailov

14 September 2014 3	Irtysh	3 – 2	Spartak Semey	Pavlodar
15:00 (UTC+6)	A.Totay 25'; Mukhutdinov (yellow card) 36'; Amanow 51'; Dudchenko 65' (pen.)	Summary	A.Ersalimov (yellow card) 23'; Y.Nurgaliyev 26', 42'	Stadium: Central Stadium; Attendance: 1,500; Referee: Aydin Rakhimbayev

20 September 2014 4	Tobol	0 – 0	Irtysh	Kostanay
16:00 (UTC+6)	R.Dzhalilov (yellow card) 67'	Summary	Chernyshov (yellow card) 35'; Džudović (yellow card) 60'; Mukhutdinov (yellow card) 69'; Z.Korobov (yellow card) 69' (yellow-red card) 84'	Stadium: Central Stadium; Attendance: 3,000; Referee: Bolat Karlibayev

28 September 2014 5	Irtysh	0 – 0	Taraz	Pavlodar
15:00 (UTC+6)	Džudović (yellow card) 74'; Amanow (yellow card) 87'	Summary	O.Yarovenko (yellow card) 62'	Stadium: Central Stadium; Attendance: 3,000; Referee: Akmalkhan Kholmatov

4 October 2014 6	Irtysh	2 – 0	Atyrau	Pavlodar
15:00 (UTC+6)	Chernyshov 49'; I.Yurin 79'	Summary	Butuyev (yellow card) 31'	Stadium: Central Stadium; Attendance: 1,500; Referee: Aleksandr Gauzer

19 October 2014 7	Spartak Semey	2 – 0	Irtysh	Semy
15:00 (UTC+6)	Jovanović 28'; E.Nurgaliyev 33' (yellow card) 81'; S.Sagindikov (yellow card) 68'	Summary	Mukhutdinov (yellow card) 86'	Stadium: Spartak Stadium; Attendance: 4,000; Referee: Aydin Rakhimbayev

25 October 2014 8	Irtysh	1 – 1	Tobol	Pavlodar
15:00 (UTC+6)	K.Begalyn 65'; A.Ayaganov (yellow card) 80'	Summary	Kurgulin (yellow card) 54'; R.Dzhalilov 85'	Stadium: Central Stadium; Attendance: 1,300; Referee: Askhat Abdanbayev

1 November 2014 9	Taraz	0 – 3	Irtysh	Taraz
17:00 (UTC+6)	O.Nedashkovsky (yellow card) 14'; Sergienko (yellow card) 26' (red card) 35'; D.Bashlay (yellow card) 81'; Dosmagambetov (yellow card) 81'	Summary	Bulgaru (yellow card) 26'; Valeyev 34' (yellow card) 74'; Ivanov (yellow card) 60' (goal) 77'; K.Begalyn 67'; Burzanović (yellow card) 82'	Stadium: Central Stadium; Attendance: 3,600; Referee: Ruslan Duzmambetov

9 November 2014 10	Zhetysu	1 – 0	Irtysh	Taldykorgan
15:00 (UTC+6)	Ergashev (yellow card) 19'; K.Zotov (yellow card) 39'; R.Sariyev 65'	Summary	Bulgaru (yellow card) 14'; Džudović (yellow card) 38'	Stadium: Zhetysu Stadium; Attendance: 1,000; Referee: Aleksandr Gauzer

===== Table =====
Pos	Team	Pld	W	D	L	GF	GA	GD	Pts	Relegation
8	Zhetysu	32	10	8	14	21	31	−10	25	
9	Atyrau	32	10	7	15	30	43	−13	25	
10	Irtysh Pavlodar	32	9	10	13	39	44	−5	25	
11	Taraz (O)	32	9	7	16	32	45	−13	25	Qualification for the relegation play-off
12	Spartak Semey (R)	32	7	7	18	30	52	−22	21	Relegation to the Kazakhstan First Division

Source: Soccerway (in Russian)
Rules for classification: 1st points;
Two team tiebreak: 1st overall wins; 2nd head-to-head record; 3rd goals difference; 4th goals scored; 5th away goals scored;
Multiple teams tiebreak: 1st overall wins; 2nd goals difference; 3rd goals scored; 4th away goals scored.
Team start with half number of points from first round.
(O) Play-off winners; (R) Relegated

=== Kazakhstan Cup ===
14 May 2014 Second Round	Irtysh	3 – 1	FC Kyzylzhar	Pavlodar
18:00 (UTC+6)	Burzanović 27', 33' (yellow card) 57'; Goloveshkin 90'	Summary	R.Kenetaev 60'; A.Ustinov (yellow card) 73'; Y.Bekmukhayev (yellow card) 88'	Stadium: Central Stadium; Attendance: 2,000; Referee: Dmitriy Bystrov

18 June 2014 Quarter-final	Shakhter Karagandy	1 – 0	Irtysh	Karaganda
18:30 (UTC+6)	Paryvaew (yellow card) 43'; Murzoev 61'; Vičius (yellow card) 71'; Vasiljević (yellow card) 86'	Summary	Chernyshov (yellow card) 40'; Bakayev (yellow card) 90+3'	Stadium: Shakhter Stadium; Attendance: 2,500; Referee: Askhat Abdanbayev

== Squad statistics ==
As of Match played 9 November 2014

=== Appearances and goals ===
No.	Pos	Nat	Player	Total		Premier League		Kazakhstan Cup	
No.	Pos	Nat	Player	Apps	Goals	Apps	Goals	Apps	Goals
3	DF	(Kazakhstan) KAZ	Vladislav Chernyshov	25	1	20+4	1	1	0
4	DF	(Montenegro) MNE	Miodrag Džudović	27	0	26	0	1	0
7	MF	(Turkmenistan) TKM	Arslanmyrat Amanow	26	1	15+9	1	1+1	0
8	MF	(Kazakhstan) KAZ	Evgeniy Averchenko	29	1	21+8	1	0	0
9	FW	(Kazakhstan) KAZ	Kuanysh Begalyn	19	3	4+13	3	1+1	0
11	MF	(Kyrgyzstan) KGZ	Sergei Ivanov	14	1	6+7	1	1	0
13	MF	(Kazakhstan) KAZ	Alibek Ayaganov	16	2	8+7	2	1	0
14	MF	(Kazakhstan) KAZ	Igor Yurin	32	3	25+5	3	2	0
17	FW	(Kazakhstan) KAZ	Altynbek Dauletkhanov	1	0	0+1	0	0	0
19	DF	(Kazakhstan) KAZ	Grigori Sartakov	14	0	13	0	1	0
20	MF	(Kazakhstan) KAZ	Abylaykhan Totay	13	2	11+1	2	1	0
21	GK	(Kazakhstan) KAZ	Nikita Kalmykov	5	0	3	0	2	0
23	DF	(Kazakhstan) KAZ	Zakhar Korobov	20	1	16+3	1	0+1	0
24	DF	(Moldova) MDA	Simeon Bulgaru	12	0	9+3	0	0	0
25	DF	(Kazakhstan) KAZ	Ihor Chuchman	15	0	12+1	0	2	0
30	FW	(Ukraine) UKR	Kostyantyn Dudchenko	23	11	18+3	11	1+1	0
33	GK	(Kazakhstan) KAZ	Vyacheslav Kotlyar	26	0	26	0	0	0
50	MF	(Ukraine) UKR	Rinar Valeyev	13	1	12+1	1	0	0
60	DF	(Bulgaria) BUL	Orlin Starokin	11	0	5+5	0	1	0
77	MF	(Russia) RUS	Almir Mukhutdinov	29	1	27+1	1	1	0
95	MF	(Kazakhstan) KAZ	Vladimir Vomenko	1	0	0+1	0	0	0
98	MF	(Montenegro) MNE	Igor Burzanović	28	8	16+10	6	2	2
	MF	(Kazakhstan) KAZ	Bagdat Urazalie	1	0	0+1	0	0	0
	MF	(Kazakhstan) KAZ	Vitaliy Goloveshkin	1	1	0	0	0+1	1
Players away from Irtysh on loan:
5	MF	(Serbia) SRB	Predrag Govedarica	16	1	15	1	1	0
Players who appeared for Irtysh that left during the season:
1	GK	(Serbia) SRB	Nemanja Džodžo	3	0	3	0	0	0
2	DF	(Kazakhstan) KAZ	Bakdaulet Kozhabayev	5	0	3+2	0	0	0
6	MF	(Kazakhstan) KAZ	Anton Chichulin	16	1	14	1	2	0
10	MF	(Uzbekistan) UZB	Ulugbek Bakayev	17	2	14+2	2	0+1	0
15	DF	(Czech Republic) CZE	Jakub Chleboun	10	0	9	0	1	0
	FW	(Kazakhstan) KAZ	Timur Baizhanov	1	0	0+1	0	0	0

=== Goal scorers ===
Place	Position	Nation	Number	Name	Premier League	Kazakhstan Cup	Total
1	FW	(Ukraine)	30	Kostyantyn Dudchenko	11	0	11
2	MF	(Montenegro)	98	Igor Burzanović	6	2	8
3	MF	(Kazakhstan)	14	Igor Yurin	3	0	3
3	FW	(Kazakhstan)	9	Kuanysh Begalyn	3	0	3
5	MF	(Kazakhstan)	20	Abylaykhan Totay	2	0	2
5	MF	(Uzbekistan)	10	Ulugbek Bakayev	2	0	2
5	MF	(Kazakhstan)	13	Alibek Ayaganov	2	0	2
8	MF	(Turkmenistan)	7	Arslanmyrat Amanow	1	0	1
8	DF	(Kazakhstan)	3	Vladislav Chernyshov	1	0	1
8	MF	(Ukraine)	50	Rinar Valeyev	1	0	1
8	MF	(Kyrgyzstan)	11	Sergei Ivanov	1	0	1
8	MF	(Kazakhstan)	8	Evgeniy Averchenko	1	0	1
8	DF	(Montenegro)	4	Miodrag Džudović	1	0	1
8	MF	(Serbia)	5	Predrag Govedarica	1	0	1
8	MF	(Kazakhstan)	6	Anton Chichulin	1	0	1
8	DF	(Kazakhstan)	23	Zakhar Korobov	1	0	1
8	MF	(Russia)	77	Almir Mukhutdinov	1	0	1
8	MF	(Kazakhstan)		Vitaliy Goloveshkin	0	1	1
				TOTALS	39	3	42

=== Disciplinary record ===
Number	Nation	Position	Name	Premier League		Kazakhstan Cup		Total	
Number	Nation	Position	Name	Yellow card	Red card	Yellow card	Red card	Yellow card	Red card
3	(Kazakhstan)	DF	Vladislav Chernyshov	5	1	1	0	6	1
4	(Montenegro)	DF	Miodrag Džudović	4	0	0	0	4	0
5	(Serbia)	MF	Predrag Govedarica	4	0	0	0	4	0
6	(Kazakhstan)	MF	Anton Chichulin	1	0	0	0	1	0
7	(Turkmenistan)	MF	Arslanmyrat Amanow	4	0	0	0	4	0
10	(Uzbekistan)	FW	Ulugbek Bakayev	7	1	1	0	8	1
11	(Kyrgyzstan)	MF	Sergei Ivanov	3	0	0	0	3	0
13	(Kazakhstan)	MF	Alibek Ayaganov	5	0	0	0	5	0
15	(Czech Republic)	DF	Jakub Chleboun	2	0	0	0	2	0
19	(Kazakhstan)	DF	Grigori Sartakov	1	0	0	0	1	0
20	(Kazakhstan)	MF	Abylaykhan Totay	0	1	0	0	0	1
23	(Kazakhstan)	DF	Zakhar Korobov	7	1	0	0	7	1
24	(Moldova)	DF	Simeon Bulgaru	3	0	0	0	3	0
25	(Kazakhstan)	DF	Ihor Chuchman	4	0	0	0	4	0
30	(Ukraine)	FW	Kostyantyn Dudchenko	1	0	0	0	1	0
50	(Ukraine)	MF	Rinar Valeyev	1	0	0	0	1	0
60	(Bulgaria)	DF	Orlin Starokin	2	0	0	0	2	0
77	(Russia)	MF	Almir Mukhutdinov	11	0	0	0	11	0
98	(Montenegro)	MF	Igor Burzanović	7	1	1	0	8	1
			TOTALS	72	5	3	0	75	5
