= 2016 FC Akzhayik season =

FC Akzhayik
2016 season
- Chairman: Rashid Khusnutdinov
- Manager: Talgat Baysufinov
- Stadium: Petr Atoyan Stadium
- Kazakhstan Premier League: 10th
- Kazakhstan Cup: Last 16 vs Irtysh Pavlodar
- Top goalscorer: League: Freddy Coronel (8); All: Freddy Coronel (8)
Home colours	Away colours

The 2016 FC Akzhayik season is the club's 8th season in the Kazakhstan Premier League, the highest tier of association football in Kazakhstan, and their first since 2010.They will also participate in the Kazakhstan Cup.

== Squad ==
As of 16 August 2016

Note: Flags indicate national team as defined under FIFA eligibility rules; some limited exceptions apply. Players may hold more than one non-FIFA nationality.

No.	Pos.	Nation	Player
1	GK	KAZ	Nurbolat Kalmenov
5	MF	KAZ	Ivan Antipov
6	DF	BIH	Saša Kolunija
7	FW	CHI	Matías Rubio
8	FW	KAZ	Aleksey Maltsev
9	MF	KAZ	Ruslan Valiullin
11	MF	KAZ	Rakhimzhan Rozybakiev
12	FW	SRB	Miroslav Lečić
13	DF	KAZ	Miram Sapanov
14	DF	KAZ	Bauyrzhan Omarov
15	MF	KAZ	Yevgeniy Levin (loan from Tobol)
16	MF	PAR	Freddy Coronel
17	MF	KAZ	Sergey Shevtsov
18	MF	KAZ	Ruslan Khairov
20	MF	KAZ	Abylaykhan Totay

No.	Pos.	Nation	Player
22	MF	KAZ	Nikolay Zabrodin
23	DF	KAZ	Zakhar Korobov
24	FW	KAZ	Kuanysh Begalin (loan from Irtysh Pavlodar)
26	DF	KAZ	Erkin Tapalov
28	FW	KAZ	Sergey Gridin
29	DF	NGR	Michael Odibe
33	MF	KAZ	Eduard Sergienko
40	FW	UKR	Kostyantyn Dudchenko
44	MF	KAZ	Marat Shakhmetov
55	MF	SRB	Predrag Govedarica
77	DF	KAZ	Eldar Abdrakhmanov
83	DF	SRB	Danilo Nikolić
87	GK	KAZ	Roman Bagautdinov
88	MF	KAZ	Anton Shurygin

== Transfers ==
=== Winter ===
In: Note: Flags indicate national team as defined under FIFA eligibility rules; some limited exceptions apply. Players may hold more than one non-FIFA nationality.

No.	Pos.	Nation	Player
6	DF	SRB	Saša Kolunija (from (Serbia) Zemun)
16	MF	PAR	Freddy Coronel (from (Argentina) Independiente Rivadavia)
23	DF	KAZ	Zakhar Korobov (from (Kazakhstan) Irtysh Pavlodar)
24	FW	KAZ	Kuanysh Begalin (loan from (Kazakhstan) Irtysh Pavlodar)
28	FW	KAZ	Sergey Gridin (from (Kazakhstan) Okzhetpes)
33	MF	KAZ	Eduard Sergienko (from (Kazakhstan) Taraz)
55	MF	SRB	Predrag Govedarica (from (Serbia) Bežanija)
83	DF	SRB	Danilo Nikolić

Out: Note: Flags indicate national team as defined under FIFA eligibility rules; some limited exceptions apply. Players may hold more than one non-FIFA nationality.

No.	Pos.	Nation	Player
3	DF	BUL	Yanko Valkanov (to (Bulgaria) Botev Galabovo)
6	FW	KAZ	Magamed Uzdenov
10	FW	KAZ	Akzhol Serikzhanov
35	GK	KAZ	Andrey Neupokoev
90	MF	SLO	Matic Maruško (to (Kazakhstan) Kaisar)

Trialists: Note: Flags indicate national team as defined under FIFA eligibility rules; some limited exceptions apply. Players may hold more than one non-FIFA nationality.

No.	Pos.	Nation	Player
—	FW	SRB	Dejan Đenić
—	FW	SRB	Nemanja Jovanović

=== Summer ===
In: Note: Flags indicate national team as defined under FIFA eligibility rules; some limited exceptions apply. Players may hold more than one non-FIFA nationality.

No.	Pos.	Nation	Player
7	FW	CHI	Matías Rubio (from (Chile) Rangers de Talca)
11	MF	KAZ	Rakhimzhan Rozybakiev (from (Kazakhstan) Tobol)
12	FW	SRB	Miroslav Lečić (from (Serbia) Jagodina)
15	MF	KAZ	Yevgeniy Levin (loan from (Kazakhstan) Tobol)
20	MF	KAZ	Abylaykhan Totay (from (Kazakhstan) Aktobe)
29	DF	NGR	Michael Odibe (from (Romania) Concordia Chiajna)
32	GK	SRB	Srđan Ostojić (from (Serbia) Zemun)
40	FW	UKR	Kostyantyn Dudchenko (from (Kazakhstan) Tobol)
44	MF	KAZ	Marat Shakhmetov (from (Kazakhstan) Taraz)

Out: Note: Flags indicate national team as defined under FIFA eligibility rules; some limited exceptions apply. Players may hold more than one non-FIFA nationality.

No.	Pos.	Nation	Player
7	MF	KAZ	Izim Sarsekenov
20	FW	MDA	Oleg Hromțov
32	GK	SRB	Srđan Ostojić

== Friendlies ==
17 January 2016	Akzhayik (Kazakhstan)	0 – 1	(Azerbaijan) Sumgayit	Belek, Turkey
(UTC+6)		Summary	Fardjad-Azad 78'

27 February 2016	Akzhayik (Kazakhstan)	2 – 4	(Moldova) Milsami Orhei	Belek, Turkey
(UTC+6)	O.Khromtsov; A.Shurygin	Summary	Goal

== Competitions ==
=== Kazakhstan Premier League ===
==== Regular season ====
===== Results summary =====
Overall								Home						Away					
Pld	W	D	L	GF	GA	GD	Pts	W	D	L	GF	GA	GD	W	D	L	GF	GA	GD
22	3	2	17	12	44	−32	11	2	1	8	6	25	−19	1	1	9	6	19	−13

Last updated: 26 July 2016.
Source: See Results

===== Results by round =====
Round	1	2	3	4	5	6	7	8	9	10	11	12	13	14	15	16	17	18	19	20	21	22
Ground	A	H	H	H	A	A	H	A	H	A	H	A	A	A	H	H	A	H	A	H	A	H
Result	L	L	W	L	W	L	L	L	D	L	L	D	L	L	W	L	L	L	L	L	L	L
Position	10	12	7	9	7	7	9	11	10	10	11	11	11	11	11	11	11	11	12	12	12	12

Source: See results
A = Away; H = Home; W = Win; D = Draw; L = Loss

===== Results =====
13 March 2016 1	Tobol	1 – 0	Akzhayik	Kostanay
15:00 (UTC+6)	Šimkovič (yellow card) 63'; Dudchenko 70'; Dosmagambetov (yellow card) 90'	Summary	Sergienko (yellow card) 61'	Stadium: Central Stadium; Attendance: 3,000; Referee: Marat Iskakov

19 March 2016 2	Akzhayik	0 – 3	Irtysh Pavlodar	Oral
16:00 (UTC+6)	M.Sapanov (yellow card) 58'; Sergienko (yellow card) 60'	Summary	Akhmetov 27'; Jallow 45+1'; R.Murtazayev 55' (yellow card) 70'; Fonseca (yellow card) 63'	Stadium: Petr Atoyan Stadium; Attendance: 2,000; Referee: Denis Izmailov

3 April 2016 3	Akzhayik	2 – 1	Kairat	Oral
16:00 (UTC+6)	Govedarica (yellow card) 3'; Hromțov (yellow card) 35'; Coronel 48' (pen.); Valiullin 62'; R.Bagautdinov (yellow card) 90+4'	Summary	Soares (yellow card) 22'; V.Li 57'; Kuat (yellow card) 90+4'	Stadium: Petr Atoyan Stadium; Attendance: 2,500; Referee: Artyom Kuchin

9 April 2016 4	Akzhayik	0 – 2	Okzhetpes	Oral
16:00 (UTC+6)	Nikolić (yellow card) 43'; Govedarica (yellow card) 52'; Z.Korobov (yellow card) 71'	Summary	Buleshev 25'; Kozhamberdi (yellow card) 65'; Nane (yellow card) 78'; Z.Moldakaraev (yellow card) 82'; Ristović 90+3'	Stadium: Petr Atoyan Stadium; Attendance: 2,500; Referee: Tiumur Kumashev

13 April 2016 5	Taraz	0 – 1	Akzhayik	Taraz
18:00 (UTC+6)	M.Amirkhanov (yellow card) 58'; T.Danilyuk (yellow card) 60'; Vorotnikov (yellow card) 71'; B.Baitana (yellow card) 72'	Summary	A.Shurygin (yellow card) 49'; Z.Korobov (yellow card) 53'; K.Begalin 81'	Stadium: Central Stadium; Attendance: 3,500; Referee: Igor Aleshin

17 April 2016 6	Atyrau	2 – 0	Akzhayik	Atyrau
17:00 (UTC+6)	Shabalin 4'; Trytko 19'	Summary	Govedarica (yellow card) 42'; Sergienko (yellow card) 61'	Stadium: Munaishy Stadium; Attendance: 1,200; Referee: Sergey Gorokhovodatskiy

23 April 2016 7	Akzhayik	0 – 1	Shakhter Karagandy	Oral
18:00 (UTC+6)	A.Shurygin (yellow card) 12'; Govedarica (yellow card) 79'; Nikolić (red card) 84'	Summary	Finonchenko 17'; Y.Baginskiy (yellow card) 87'	Stadium: Petr Atoyan Stadium; Attendance: 1,500; Referee: Ruslan Duzmambetov

1 May 2016 8	Ordabasy	1 – 0	Akzhayik	Shymkent
16:00 (UTC+6)	Tazhimbetov 72'	Summary	S.Shevtsov (yellow card) 39'; M.Sapanov (yellow card) 43' (yellow-red card) 83'	Stadium: Kazhymukan Munaitpasov Stadium; Attendance: 5,000; Referee: Akmalkhan Kholmatov

5 May 2016 9	Akzhayik	0 – 0	Aktobe	Oral
18:00 (UTC+6)	Kolunija (yellow card) 50'; Govedarica (yellow card) 73'; S.Shevtsov (yellow card) 80'	Summary	Zhangylyshbay (yellow card) 85'; V.Kryukov (yellow card) 86'	Stadium: Petr Atoyan Stadium; Attendance: 3,000; Referee: Denis Izmailov

10 May 2016 10	Astana	2 – 0	Akzhayik	Astana
16:00 (UTC+6)	Nusserbayev 45'; Twumasi 48'	Summary		Stadium: Astana Arena; Attendance: 2,500; Referee: Viktor Antonov

15 May 2016 11	Akzhayik	1 – 2	Zhetysu	Oral
18:00 (UTC+6)	A.Maltsev (yellow card) 9'; M.Sapanov (yellow card) 34'; Hromțov 80'; R.Khairov (yellow card) 84'	Summary	Simonovski 3' (yellow card) 51'; Mojsov (yellow card) 26'; S.Sagyndykov (yellow card) 30'; Klein (yellow card) 58'; Savić 90+1' (pen.)	Stadium: Petr Atoyan Stadium; Attendance: 3,000; Referee: Askhat Abdanbayev

21 May 2016 12	Irtysh Pavlodar	0 – 0	Akzhayik	Pavlodar
18:00 (UTC+6)	Fall (yellow card) 70'; Akhmetov (red card) 78'	Summary	A.Shurygin (yellow card) 12'; Govedarica (yellow card) 44' (yellow-red card) 73'; R.Bagautdinov (yellow card) 87'	Stadium: Central Stadium; Attendance: 5,000; Referee: Daniyar Sakhi

29 May 2016 13	Kairat	3 – 2	Akzhayik	Almaty
18:00 (UTC+6)	Islamkhan 16' (pen.); Kuat (yellow card) 55'; Gohou 89'; Tawamba 90+2'	Summary	Valiullin 3'; Hromțov (yellow card) 22' (goal) 31'; B.Omarov (yellow card) 36'; A.Shurygin (yellow card) 37'; R.Bagautdinov (yellow card) 81'; A.Maltsev (yellow card) 85'	Stadium: Central Stadium; Attendance: 8,000; Referee: Furkat Atajanow

2 June 2016 14	Okzhetpes	4 – 2	Akzhayik	Astana
16:00 (UTC+6)	S.N'Ganbe 10', 51'; Ristović 35'; Khayrullin 44'; S.Zhumahanov (yellow card) 81'	Summary	I.Antipov 7'; Govedarica (yellow card) 28'; Nikolić (yellow card) 33'; Valiullin (yellow card) 45'; K.Begalin 81'	Stadium: Astana Arena; Attendance: 1,000; Referee: Aydin Rakhimbayev

11 June 2016 15	Akzhayik	2 – 1	Taraz	Oral
19:30 (UTC+6)	Nikolić (yellow card) 12'; Coronel 16', 54'; R.Rozybakiev (yellow card) 43'; Lečić (yellow card) 57' (yellow-red card) 90'	Summary	Yevstigneyev (yellow card) 15'; Vorotnikov (yellow card) 16'; T.Danilyuk (yellow card) 27'; A.Taubay (yellow card) 40'; Mera (yellow card) 57'; D.Bayaliev (yellow card) 59'; Aliyev 75'; Grigoryev (yellow card) 90+3'	Stadium: Petr Atoyan Stadium; Attendance: 2,500; Referee: Aleksandr Aliyev

15 June 2016 16	Akzhayik	0 – 4	Atyrau	Oral
19:30 (UTC+6)	R.Rozybakiev (yellow card) 68'; S.Shevtsov (yellow card) 80'	Summary	Korobkin 17' (yellow card) 53'; Arzhanov 33'; Essame (yellow card) 55'; Sharpar 63'; Curtean 73'	Stadium: Petr Atoyan Stadium; Attendance: 2,500; Referee: Askhat Abdanbayev

19 June 2016 17	Shakhter Karagandy	3 – 1	Akzhayik	Karaganda
17:00 (UTC+6)	Vasiljević 27' (yellow card) 49'; Ubbink 45+2', 86' (yellow card) 86'	Summary	Govedarica (yellow card) 71'; Lečić 90+3'	Stadium: Shakhter Stadium; Attendance: 2,000; Referee: Daniyar Sakhi

24 June 2016 18	Akzhayik	0 – 1	Ordabasy	Oral
20:00 (UTC+6)	Nikolić (yellow card) 59'; Kolunija (yellow card) 90'	Summary	Gogua (yellow card) 39'; G.Suyumbaev 42'; E.Tungyshbaev (yellow card) 69'	Stadium: Petr Atoyan Stadium; Attendance: 2,500; Referee: Sergey Gorokhovodatskiy

3 July 2016 19	Aktobe	1 – 0	Akzhayik	Aktobe
20:00 (UTC+6)	Kouadja (yellow card) 11'; Bocharov 80'	Summary	E.Abdrakhmanov (yellow card) 10'; R.Rozybakiev (yellow card) 30'; Sergienko (yellow card) 90'	Stadium: Central Stadium; Attendance: 4,000; Referee: Askhat Abdanbayev

8 July 2016 20	Akzhayik	1 – 5	Astana	Oral
20:00 (UTC+6)	Govedarica 20' (yellow card) 45+2'; Dudchenko (yellow card) 54'	Summary	Nurgaliev 2', 90+1'; Kabananga 22'; A.Tagybergen 44'; Muzhikov 64'	Stadium: Petr Atoyan Stadium; Attendance: 3,000; Referee: Igor Aleshin

16 July 2016 21	Zhetysu	2 – 0	Akzhayik	Taldykorgan
18:00 (UTC+6)	Klein (yellow card) 27'; Đalović 68'; Kadio 70'	Summary	E.Abdrakhmanov (yellow card) 14'; Shakhmetov (yellow card) 73'; R.Rozybakiev (yellow card) 79'	Stadium: Zhetysu Stadium; Attendance: 2,000; Referee: Daniyar Sakhi

24 July 2016 22	Akzhayik	0 – 5	Tobol	Oral
20:00 (UTC+6)	Lečić (yellow card) 78'	Summary	Šimkovič (yellow card) 11'; Žulpa (yellow card) 35' (goal) 75'; Savić 50', 56'; Zhumaskaliyev 84'; Khizhnichenko 90'	Stadium: Petr Atoyan Stadium; Attendance: 1,500; Referee: Furkat Atajanow

===== League table =====
Pos	Team	Pld	W	D	L	GF	GA	GD	Pts	Qualification
8	Tobol	22	8	4	10	28	26	+2	28 (Note: Head-to-head record: Aktobe (7 points), Atyrau (5 points), Tobol (4 points).)	Qualification for the relegation round
9	Zhetysu	22	6	5	11	22	32	−10	23	Qualification for the relegation round
10	Shakhter Karagandy	22	5	6	11	10	27	−17	21	Qualification for the relegation round
11	Taraz	22	5	4	13	22	30	−8	19	Qualification for the relegation round
12	Akzhayik	22	3	2	17	12	44	−32	11	Qualification for the relegation round

Source: UEFA.com, Soccerway
Rules for classification: 1) Points; 2) Head-to-head points; 3) Head-to-head matches won; 4) Head-to-head goal difference; 5) Head-to-head goals scored; 6) Head-to-head away goals scored; 7) Goal difference; 8) Matches won; 9) Goals scored; 10) Away goals scored; 11) Draw.

==== Relegation round ====
===== Results summary =====
Overall								Home						Away					
Pld	W	D	L	GF	GA	GD	Pts	W	D	L	GF	GA	GD	W	D	L	GF	GA	GD
10	8	0	2	15	6	+9	24	4	0	1	8	3	+5	4	0	1	7	3	+4

Last updated: 31 October 2016.
Source: See Results

===== Results by round =====
Round	1	2	3	4	5	6	7	8	9	10
Ground	H	A	H	H	A	H	A	A	H	A
Result	W	W	W	W	W	L	L	W	W	W
Position	12	12	12	12	11	11	12	11	10	10

Source: See results
A = Away; H = Home; W = Win; D = Draw; L = Loss

===== Results =====
14 August 2016 1	Akzhayik	1 – 0	Zhetysu	Oral
19:00 (UTC+6)	Govedarica (yellow card) 21'; Lečić 60' (pen.); Sergienko (yellow card) 80'	Summary	I.Amirseitov (yellow card) 59'; Kasyanov (yellow card) 63'; Beglaryan (yellow card) 80'; Zhangylyshbay (yellow card) 80' (yellow-red card) 90+5'	Stadium: Petr Atoyan Stadium; Attendance: 2,500; Referee: Igor Aleshin

21 August 2016 2	Shakhter Karagandy	0 – 1	Akzhayik	Karaganda
18:00 (UTC+6)	Simonovski (yellow card) 37'; Vasiljević (yellow card) 81'	Summary	Coronel 57' (pen.); B.Omarov (yellow card) 61'; E.Abdrakhmanov (yellow card) 67'; A.Totay (yellow card) 90+2'	Stadium: Shakhter Stadium; Attendance: 2,000; Referee: Aydin Rakhimbayev

26 August 2016 3	Akzhayik	2 – 0	Taraz	Oral
19:00 (UTC+6)	B.Omarov (yellow card) 35'; Dudchenko 55' (yellow card) 72'; Lečić 80'	Summary	Mera (yellow card) 39'; Ergashev (yellow card) 56'	Stadium: Petr Atoyan Stadium; Attendance: 2,000; Referee: Ruslan Duzmambetov

10 September 2016 4	Akzhayik	1 – 0	Tobol	Oral
18:30 (UTC+6)	Lečić 51'; Govedarica (yellow card) 56'; Dudchenko (yellow card) 65'	Summary	Savić (yellow card) 41'; D.Miroshnichenko (yellow card) 54'; Zhumaskaliyev (yellow card) 86'	Stadium: Petr Atoyan Stadium; Attendance: 2,000; Referee: Stanislav Lesiv

17 September 2016 5	Atyrau	1 – 2	Akzhayik	Atyrau
17:00 (UTC+6)	Curtean 33'; Makas (yellow card) 90'	Summary	Dudchenko 61', 78'	Stadium: Munaishy Stadium; Attendance: 2,000; Referee: Aydin Rakhimbayev

24 September 2016 6	Akzhayik	1 – 2	Shakhter Karagandy	Oral
18:00 (UTC+6)	Lečić 61' (yellow card) 81'; E.Abdrakhmanov (yellow card) 64'; R.Rozybakiev (yellow card) 70'	Summary	Y.Goryachi 30'; Szöke 45' (yellow card) 81'; A.Tattybaev (yellow card) 83'; Skorykh (yellow card) 85'	Stadium: Petr Atoyan Stadium; Attendance: 2,000; Referee: Ruslan Duzmambetov

1 October 2016 7	Taraz	2 – 1	Akzhayik	Taraz
18:00 (UTC+6)	Mané 19' (pen.); Tazhimbetov (yellow card) 30'; Yakovlyev (yellow card) 45+1'; Pyshchur (yellow card) 49'; Mera (yellow card) 60'; A.Suley 90+1'	Summary	Sergienko (yellow card) 45+1'; I.Antipov (yellow card) 68'; Lečić (yellow card) 73'; Shakhmetov 87'	Stadium: Central Stadium; Attendance: 3,000; Referee: Artyom Kuchin

16 October 2016 8	Tobol	0 – 1	Akzhayik	Kostanay
16:00 (UTC+6)	Mukhutdinov (yellow card) 5'; Šimkovič (yellow card) 21'; D.Miroshnichenko (yellow card) 53'; Zhumaskaliyev (red card) 54'; Yavorskyi (yellow card) 80'	Summary	Lečić (yellow card) 10'; Coronel 52'; Odibe (yellow card) 80'; A.Shurygin (yellow card) 84'; D.Tolebaev (yellow card) 90+1'	Stadium: Central Stadium; Attendance: 1,200; Referee: Furkhat Atazhanov

22 October 2016 9	Akzhayik	3 – 1	Atyrau	Oral
15:00 (UTC+6)	Dudchenko 16'; R.Rozybakiev (yellow card) 31'; Coronel 37', 70'; Odibe (yellow card) 80'; Shakhmetov (yellow card) 90+2'	Summary	Muldarov (yellow card) 28'; R.Esatov (yellow card) 43'; A.Saparov (yellow card) 57'; Sharpar 60'	Stadium: Petr Atoyan Stadium; Attendance: 1,500; Referee: Viktor Antonov

29 October 2016 10	Zhetysu	0 – 2	Akzhayik	Taldykorgan
15:00 (UTC+6)	Azovskiy (yellow card) 30'; I.Kalinin (yellow card) 35'; I.Amirseitov (yellow card) 45+1'; Beglaryan (red card) 50'; Zhangylyshbay (yellow card) 87'	Summary	E.Abdrakhmanov (yellow card) 25'; Sergienko (yellow card) 26' (goal) 33'; Coronel 58'	Stadium: Zhetysu Stadium; Attendance: 2,000; Referee: Ruslan Duzmambetov

===== League table =====
Pos	Team	Pld	W	D	L	GF	GA	GD	Pts	Relegation
7	Tobol	32	12	5	15	40	40	0	41	
8	Atyrau	32	10	9	13	35	39	−4	39	
9	Shakhter Karagandy	32	10	6	16	25	40	−15	36	
10	Akzhayik	32	11	2	19	27	50	−23	35 (Note: Head-to-head record; Taraz–Akzhayik 0–1, Akzhayik–Taraz 2–1, Akzhayik–Taraz 2–0, Taraz–Akzhayik 2–1.)	
11	Taraz	32	10	5	17	33	42	−9	35	Qualification for the relegation play-offs (Note: Despite finishing 11th and losing the relegation playoffs, Taraz were readmitted because only one team was given a license.)
12	Zhetysu (R)	32	8	7	17	37	53	−16	31	Relegation to the Kazakhstan First Division

Source: Soccerway
Rules for classification: 1) Points; 2) Head-to-head points; 3) Head-to-head matches won; 4) Head-to-head goal difference; 5) Head-to-head goals scored; 6) Head-to-head away goals scored; 7) Goal difference; 8) Matches won; 9) Goals scored; 10) Away goals scored; 11) Draw.
(R) Relegated

=== Kazakhstan Cup ===
27 April 2016 Last 16	Akzhayik	0 – 1	Irtysh Pavlodar	Oral
18:00 (UTC+6)		Summary	Herrera 8'; R.Murtazayev (yellow card) 13'; A.Ayaganov (yellow card) 52'; Kerla (yellow card) 65'	Stadium: Petr Atoyan Stadium; Attendance: 1,500; Referee: Bagdat Abdullaev

== Squad statistics ==
As of Match played 29 October 2016

=== Appearances and goals ===
No.	Pos	Nat	Player	Total		Premier League		Kazakhstan Cup	
No.	Pos	Nat	Player	Apps	Goals	Apps	Goals	Apps	Goals
1	GK	(Kazakhstan) KAZ	Nurbolat Kalmenov	10	0	10	0	0	0
5	MF	(Kazakhstan) KAZ	Ivan Antipov	11	1	2+8	1	1	0
6	DF	(Bosnia and Herzegovina) BIH	Saša Kolunija	20	0	20	0	0	0
7	FW	(Chile) CHI	Matías Rubio	7	0	3+4	0	0	0
8	FW	(Kazakhstan) KAZ	Aleksey Maltsev	12	0	5+7	0	0	0
9	MF	(Kazakhstan) KAZ	Ruslan Valiullin	31	2	23+7	2	1	0
11	MF	(Kazakhstan) KAZ	Rakhimzhan Rozybakiev	17	0	11+6	0	0	0
12	FW	(Serbia) SRB	Miroslav Lečić	16	5	16	5	0	0
13	DF	(Kazakhstan) KAZ	Miram Sapanov	26	0	20+5	0	1	0
14	DF	(Kazakhstan) KAZ	Bauyrzhan Omarov	24	0	16+7	0	1	0
15	MF	(Kazakhstan) KAZ	Yevgeniy Levin	1	0	1	0	0	0
16	MF	(Paraguay) PAR	Freddy Coronel	32	8	32	8	0	0
17	MF	(Kazakhstan) KAZ	Sergey Shevtsov	11	0	5+5	0	1	0
18	MF	(Kazakhstan) KAZ	Ruslan Khairov	6	0	3+3	0	0	0
20	MF	(Kazakhstan) KAZ	Abylaykhan Totay	2	0	0+2	0	0	0
22	MF	(Kazakhstan) KAZ	Nikolay Zabrodin	3	0	0+3	0	0	0
23	DF	(Kazakhstan) KAZ	Zakhar Korobov	4	0	4	0	0	0
24	FW	(Kazakhstan) KAZ	Kuanysh Begalin	14	2	5+8	2	0+1	0
26	DF	(Kazakhstan) KAZ	Erkin Tapalov	9	0	7+2	0	0	0
28	FW	(Kazakhstan) KAZ	Sergey Gridin	6	0	3+2	0	1	0
29	DF	(Nigeria) NGR	Michael Odibe	10	0	10	0	0	0
32	GK	(Kazakhstan) KAZ	Denis Tolebaev	10	0	10	0	0	0
33	MF	(Kazakhstan) KAZ	Eduard Sergienko	29	1	26+3	1	0	0
40	FW	(Ukraine) UKR	Kostyantyn Dudchenko	17	4	16+1	4	0	0
44	MF	(Kazakhstan) KAZ	Marat Shakhmetov	6	1	1+5	1	0	0
55	MF	(Serbia) SRB	Predrag Govedarica	30	1	29	1	1	0
77	DF	(Kazakhstan) KAZ	Eldar Abdrakhmanov	23	0	21+1	0	1	0
83	DF	(Serbia) SRB	Danilo Nikolić	17	0	15+1	0	1	0
87	GK	(Kazakhstan) KAZ	Roman Bagautdinov	8	0	7	0	1	0
88	MF	(Kazakhstan) KAZ	Anton Shurygin	19	0	13+6	0	0	0
	MF	(Kazakhstan) KAZ	Kairat Nurdauletov	1	0	0+1	0	0	0
Players away from Akzhayik on loan:
Players who appeared for Akzhayik that left during the season:
7	MF	(Kazakhstan) KAZ	Izim Sarsekenov	2	0	1	0	1	0
20	FW	(Moldova) MDA	Oleg Hromțov	15	2	11+4	2	0	0
32	GK	(Serbia) SRB	Srđan Ostojić	5	0	5	0	0	0

=== Goal scorers ===
Place	Position	Nation	Number	Name	Premier League	Kazakhstan Cup	Total
1	MF	(Paraguay)	16	Freddy Coronel	8	0	8
2	FW	(Serbia)	12	Miroslav Lečić	5	0	5
3	FW	(Ukraine)	40	Kostyantyn Dudchenko	4	0	4
4	MF	(Kazakhstan)	9	Ruslan Valiullin	2	0	2
4	FW	(Moldova)	20	Oleg Hromțov	2	0	2
4	FW	(Kazakhstan)	24	Kuanysh Begalin	2	0	2
7	MF	(Kazakhstan)	5	Ivan Antipov	1	0	1
7	MF	(Serbia)	55	Predrag Govedarica	1	0	1
7	MF	(Kazakhstan)	44	Marat Shakhmetov	1	0	1
7	MF	(Kazakhstan)	33	Eduard Sergienko	1	0	1
				TOTALS	26	0	26

=== Disciplinary record ===
Number	Nation	Position	Name	Premier League		Kazakhstan Cup		Total	
Number	Nation	Position	Name	Yellow card	Red card	Yellow card	Red card	Yellow card	Red card
5	(Kazakhstan)	MF	Ivan Antipov	1	0	0	0	1	0
6	(Bosnia and Herzegovina)	DF	Saša Kolunija	2	0	0	0	2	0
8	(Kazakhstan)	FW	Aleksey Maltsev	2	0	0	0	2	0
9	(Kazakhstan)	MF	Ruslan Valiullin	1	0	0	0	1	0
11	(Kazakhstan)	MF	Rakhimzhan Rozybakiev	6	0	0	0	6	0
12	(Serbia)	FW	Miroslav Lečić	6	1	0	0	6	1
13	(Kazakhstan)	DF	Miram Sapanov	4	1	0	0	4	1
14	(Kazakhstan)	DF	Bauyrzhan Omarov	3	0	0	0	3	0
17	(Kazakhstan)	MF	Sergey Shevtsov	3	0	0	0	3	0
18	(Kazakhstan)	MF	Ruslan Khairov	1	0	0	0	1	0
20	(Moldova)	FW	Oleg Hromțov	2	0	0	0	2	0
20	(Kazakhstan)	MF	Abylaykhan Totay	1	0	0	0	1	0
23	(Kazakhstan)	DF	Zakhar Korobov	2	0	0	0	2	0
29	(Nigeria)	DF	Michael Odibe	2	0	0	0	2	0
32	(Kazakhstan)	GK	Denis Tolebaev	1	0	0	0	1	0
33	(Kazakhstan)	MF	Eduard Sergienko	7	0	0	0	7	0
40	(Ukraine)	FW	Kostyantyn Dudchenko	3	0	0	0	3	0
44	(Kazakhstan)	MF	Marat Shakhmetov	2	0	0	0	2	0
55	(Serbia)	MF	Predrag Govedarica	12	1	0	0	12	1
77	(Kazakhstan)	DF	Eldar Abdrakhmanov	7	0	0	0	7	0
83	(Serbia)	DF	Danilo Nikolić	4	1	0	0	4	1
87	(Kazakhstan)	GK	Roman Bagautdinov	3	0	0	0	3	0
88	(Kazakhstan)	MF	Anton Shurygin	5	0	0	0	5	0
			TOTALS	77	3	0	0	77	3
