= 2014 FC Ordabasy season =

FC Ordabasy
2014 season
- Chairman: Kaysar Abdraymov
- Manager: Viktor Pasulko (until 13 March 2014); Kuanysh Karakulov (13 March - 3 April 2014); Saulius Širmelis (from 3 April 2014)
- Stadium: Kazhimukan Munaitpasov Stadium
- Kazakhstan Premier League: 4th
- Kazakhstan Cup: Second Round vs Taraz
- Top goalscorer: League: Artem Kasyanov (7); All: Azat Nurgaliev (8)
Home colours	Away colours

The 2014 FC Ordabasy season was the 12th season back in the Kazakhstan Premier League, the highest tier of association football in Kazakhstan, following their promotion from to the Kazakhstan First Division in 2003. Ordabasy finished the season in 4th place, qualifying for the UEFA Europa League on goal difference. Ordabasy also reached the Second Round of the Kazakhstan Cup where they were knocked out by Taraz.

Saulius Širmelis was appointed the club's manager on 3 April.

== Squad ==
As of 22 September 2014

Note: Flags indicate national team as defined under FIFA eligibility rules; some limited exceptions apply. Players may hold more than one non-FIFA nationality.

No.	Pos.	Nation	Player
1	GK	KAZ	Aleksandr Grigorenko
2	DF	BRA	Freire (loan from Nacional)
4	DF	KAZ	Mukhtar Mukhtarov
5	DF	KAZ	Gafurzhan Suyumbayev
6	MF	KAZ	Piraliy Aliev
7	MF	KAZ	Azat Nurgaliyev
8	MF	KAZ	Bekzat Beisenov
9	FW	KAZ	Sergey Gridin
10	MF	KAZ	Kairat Ashirbekov
12	MF	UKR	Artem Kasyanov
11	MF	CZE	Ondřej Kúdela
14	DF	UGA	Andrew Mwesigwa

No.	Pos.	Nation	Player
17	MF	KAZ	Mardan Tolebek
18	FW	KAZ	Daurenbek Tazhimbetov
21	MF	KAZ	Yerkebulan Tungyshbayev
22	MF	KAZ	Nursayyn Joldasov
23	DF	KAZ	Bakdaulet Kozhabayev
25	MF	SEN	Abdoulaye Diakate
27	GK	KAZ	Andrei Tsvetkov
32	GK	KAZ	Samat Otarbaev
38	MF	KAZ	Ali Aliyev
39	FW	KAZ	Maksim Filchakov
77	DF	KAZ	Talgat Adyrbekov
90	DF	KAZ	Eldar Baktygaliev

== Transfers ==
=== Winter ===
In: Note: Flags indicate national team as defined under FIFA eligibility rules; some limited exceptions apply. Players may hold more than one non-FIFA nationality.

No.	Pos.	Nation	Player
2	DF	BRA	Freire (loan from (Portugal) Nacional)
5	DF	KAZ	Gafurzhan Suyumbayev (from (Kazakhstan) Irtysh Pavlodar)
18	FW	KAZ	Daurenbek Tazhimbetov (from (Kazakhstan) Shakhter Karagandy)
25	MF	SEN	Abdoulaye Diakate (from (Kazakhstan) Taraz)
38	MF	KAZ	Ali Aliyev (from (Kazakhstan) Vostok)
44	DF	SRB	Mladen Lazarević (from (Serbia) Novi Pazar)
89	FW	CZE	Pavel Černý (from (Kazakhstan) Akzhayik)
—	DF	KAZ	Kazbek Geteriev (from (Kazakhstan) Kairat)

Out: Note: Flags indicate national team as defined under FIFA eligibility rules; some limited exceptions apply. Players may hold more than one non-FIFA nationality.

No.	Pos.	Nation	Player
8	MF	KAZ	Andrei Karpovich (to (Kazakhstan) Atyrau)
9	FW	KAZ	Gleb Maltsev
11	FW	SEN	Gueye Mansour (to (Romania) Poli Timișoara)
21	FW	GEO	Davit Chagelishvili (to (Kazakhstan) Kyzylzhar)
85	FW	BRA	Andrezinho (to (Thailand) Phuket)
88	FW	NGR	Baba Collins
99	DF	TUN	Mohamed Larbi Arouri
—	FW	SRB	Danilo Belić

=== Summer ===
In: Note: Flags indicate national team as defined under FIFA eligibility rules; some limited exceptions apply. Players may hold more than one non-FIFA nationality.

No.	Pos.	Nation	Player
9	FW	KAZ	Sergey Gridin (from (Kazakhstan) Atyrau)
11	MF	CZE	Ondřej Kúdela (from (Czech Republic) Mladá Boleslav)
23	DF	KAZ	Bakdaulet Kozhabayev (from (Kazakhstan) Irtysh)

Out: Note: Flags indicate national team as defined under FIFA eligibility rules; some limited exceptions apply. Players may hold more than one non-FIFA nationality.

No.	Pos.	Nation	Player
2	DF	KAZ	Farkhadbek Irismetov (loan to (Kazakhstan) Tobol)
28	FW	CRO	Edin Junuzović (to (South Korea) Gyeongnam)
44	DF	SRB	Mladen Lazarević
89	FW	CZE	Pavel Černý (to (Czech Republic) Hradec Králové)
—	DF	KAZ	Yevhen Levin (to (Kazakhstan) Aktobe)
—	MF	KAZ	Kazbek Geteriev (to (Kazakhstan) Kaisar)

== Competitions ==
=== Overview ===
Competition	First match	Last match	Starting round	Final position	Record							
Competition	First match	Last match	Starting round	Final position	Pld	W	D	L	GF	GA	GD	Win %
Premier League	15 March 2014	9 November 2014	Matchday 1	4th	32	13	5	14	34	44	−10	40.63
Kazakhstan Cup	23 April 2014	14 May 2014	First Round	Second Round	2	1	0	1	3	3	+0	50.00
Total					34	14	5	15	37	47	−10	41.18

Last updated: 9 November 2014
Source: Competitions

=== Premier League ===
==== First round ====
===== Results by round =====
Round	1	2	3	4	5	6	7	8	9	10	11	12	13	14	15	16	17	18	19	20	21	22
Ground	A	H	A	H	A	H	A	H	A	A	H	A	H	A	H	A	H	A	H	A	H	H
Result	L	L	W	W	L	W	L	W	D	D	L	D	W	L	W	D	W	L	W	W	D	W
Position																						

Source: Soccerway
A = Away; H = Home; W = Win; D = Draw; L = Loss

===== Results =====
15 March 2014 1	Kaisar	1 – 0	Ordabasy	Kyzylorda
16:00 (UTC+6)	Savić 23' (pen.); A.Baltaev (yellow card) 56'	Summary	Junuzović (yellow card) 22'; Nurgaliev (yellow card) 60'; Mukhtarov (yellow card) 75'	Stadium: Gany Muratbayev Stadium; Attendance: 4,000; Referee: Aleksandr Aliyev

22 March 2014 2	Ordabasy	0 – 1	Astana	Shymkent
15:00 (UTC+6)	Diakate (yellow card) 59'; Tungyshbayev (yellow card) 78'	Summary	Shomko (yellow card) 69'; Cícero 82'	Stadium: Kazhimukan Munaitpasov Stadium; Attendance: 5,000; Referee: Aydin Rakhimbayev

29 March 2014 3	Kairat	0 – 1	Ordabasy	Almaty
17:00 (UTC+6)	Yedigaryan (yellow card) 42'	Summary	Junuzović 84'	Stadium: Central Stadium; Attendance: 9,500; Referee: Ruslan Duzmambetov

6 April 2014 4	Ordabasy	3 – 0	Tobol	Shymkent
15:00 (UTC+6)	Mukhtarov (yellow card) 22'; Diakate 31' (yellow card) 65'; Ashirbekov (yellow card) 48'; Junuzović 68', 81'	Summary	Kurgulin (yellow card) 22'; Šljivić (yellow card) 85'	Stadium: Kazhimukan Munaitpasov Stadium; Attendance: 4,000; Referee: Marat Iskakov

9 April 2014 5	Irtysh	2 – 0	Ordabasy	Pavlodar
18:00 (UTC+6)	Chleboun (yellow card) 6'; Burzanović 13', 17'; Mukhutdinov (yellow card) 16'; Bakayev (yellow card) 70'	Summary	Mwesigwa (yellow card) 42'	Stadium: Central Stadium; Attendance: 3,200; Referee: Anatolyi Vishnichenko

13 April 2014 6	Ordabasy	1 – 0	Aktobe	Shymkent
16:00 (UTC+6)	Junuzović 2'; Geteriev (yellow card) 61'; Ashirbekov (yellow card) 86'; Grigorenko (yellow card) 90+2'	Summary	Muldarov (yellow card) 5'	Stadium: Kazhimukan Munaitpasov Stadium; Attendance: 4,500; Referee: Igor Aleshin

19 April 2014 7	Shakhter Karagandy	3 – 1	Ordabasy	Karaganda
16:00 (UTC+6)	Baizhanov 7'; Salomov 20'; Vičius 46'; Simčević (yellow card) 69'	Summary	Mukhtarov (yellow card) 20'; Kasyanov (yellow card) 23'; Ashirbekov (yellow card) 54'; Diakate (yellow card) 90'; M.Tolebek 90+1'	Stadium: Shakhter Stadium; Attendance: 5,000; Referee: Igor Khisamutdinov

27 April 2014 8	Ordabasy	2 – 1	Spartak Semey	Shymkent
16:00 (UTC+6)	Mwesigwa 44', 73'; Ashirbekov (yellow card) 74'; Kasyanov (yellow card) 77'	Summary	A.Sakenov (yellow card) 54'; Kutsov (yellow card) 61'; Čović 65'; S.Sagindikov (yellow card) 72'	Stadium: Kazhimukan Munaitpasov Stadium; Attendance: 3,000; Referee: Akmalkhan Kholmatov

1 May 2014 9	Atyrau	1 – 1	Ordabasy	Atyrau
17:00 (UTC+6)	E.Kostrub (yellow card) 24'; Trifunović 25'	Summary	Kasyanov 15'; Y.Levin (yellow card) 30'; Aliev (yellow card) 58'	Stadium: Munaishy Stadium; Attendance: 3,000; Referee: Denis Tevyashov

6 May 2014 10	Ordabasy	1 – 1	Zhetysu	Shymkent
17:30 (UTC+6)	Nurgaliev 45' (pen.); Y.Levin (yellow card) 68'; Suyumbayev (yellow card) 71'	Summary	Z.Zarechny 31'; Ahmetović (yellow card) 58'; Kadio (yellow card) 60'; B.Shaikhov (yellow card) 62'	Stadium: Kazhimukan Munaitpasov Stadium; Attendance: 4,000; Referee: Artyom Kuchin

10 May 2014 11	Taraz	2 – 1	Ordabasy	Taraz
17:00 (UTC+6)	Shchetkin 9'; V.Evstigneev (yellow card) 36'; I.Vorotnikov 43'	Summary	Nurgaliev (yellow card) 18' (goal) 90+2'; Diakate (yellow card) 52'; Kasyanov (yellow card) 63'	Stadium: Central Stadium; Attendance: 3,800; Referee: Igor Aleshin

18 May 2014 12	Astana	1 – 1	Ordabasy	Astana
15:00 (UTC+6)	Dzholchiev 18'; Muzhikov (yellow card) 34'; Nusserbayev (yellow card) 75'	Summary	Aliev (yellow card) 18'; Diakate 26'	Stadium: Astana Arena; Attendance: 2,500; Referee: Viktor Antonov

24 May 2014 13	Ordabasy	1 – 0	Kairat	Shymkent
18:00 (UTC+6)	Nurgaliev (yellow card) 10'; Aliev (yellow card) 63'; Kasyanov (yellow card) 81'; Bakayev 86' (o.g.); Grigorenko (yellow card) 90+3'	Summary	Kislitsyn (yellow card) 13'; Michalík (yellow card) 90+3'	Stadium: Kazhimukan Munaitpasov Stadium; Attendance: 3,500; Referee: Akmalkhan Kholmatov

28 May 2014 14	Tobol	2 – 1	Ordabasy	Kostanay
19:00 (UTC+6)	Jeslínek (yellow card) 29'; Bogdanov (yellow card) 40'; Šljivić (yellow card) 68'; Kurgulin (yellow card) 87'; Bugaiov 89', 90+2' (yellow card) 90+4'	Summary	Ashirbekov (yellow card) 41'; Junuzović 72'; Nurgaliev (yellow card) 87'; Mukhtarov (yellow card) 90+4'	Stadium: Central Stadium; Attendance: 4,000; Referee: Denis Tevyashov

1 June 2014 15	Ordabasy	2 – 1	Irtysh	Shymkent
18:00 (UTC+6)	Ashirbekov 31'; Freire 81' (yellow card) 81'; Tungyshbayev (yellow card) 82'	Summary	A.Ayaganov 35'; Mukhutdinov (yellow card) 37'; Chernyshov (yellow card) 61'; Dudchenko (yellow card) 77'	Stadium: Kazhimukan Munaitpasov Stadium; Attendance: 5,000; Referee: Bolat Karlibayev

14 June 2014 16	Aktobe	1 – 1	Ordabasy	Aktobe
20:00 (UTC+6)	Anderson Mineiro (yellow card) 15'; Zyankovich 29' (pen.) (yellow card) 45+1'	Summary	Nurgaliev (yellow card) 26'; Kasyanov (yellow card) 66'; Ashirbekov 69'; Grigorenko (yellow card) 90+2'	Stadium: Central Stadium; Attendance: 11,000; Referee: Artyom Kuchin

22 June 2014 17	Ordabasy	2 – 1	Shakhter Karagandy	Shymkent
18:00 (UTC+6)	Kasyanov 53'; Nurgaliev 58'; Suyumbayev (yellow card) 90+4'	Summary	Paryvaew 6'; Konysbayev (yellow card) 25'; Pokrivač (yellow card) 71'	Stadium: Kazhimukan Munaitpasov Stadium; Attendance: 4,000; Referee: Marat Iskakov

28 June 2014 18	Spartak Semey	2 – 0	Ordabasy	Semey
18:30 (UTC+6)	Rudzik 8'; V.Akhmeyev 13'; Azovskiy (yellow card) 15'; A.Avagyan (yellow card) 17'; Ovshinov (yellow card) 53'	Summary	Mwesigwa (yellow card) 5'; Suyumbayev (yellow card) 88'	Stadium: Spartak Stadium; Attendance: 3,000; Referee: Askhat Abdanbayev

5 July 2014 19	Ordabasy	1 – 0	Atyrau	Shymkent
19:00 (UTC+6)	Diakate (yellow card) 37'; Kasyanov 76' (yellow card) 77'	Summary	Abdulin (yellow card) 37'; V.Chureyev (yellow card) 59'; Blažić (yellow card) 84'	Stadium: Kazhimukan Munaitpasov Stadium; Attendance: 2,500; Referee: Igor Chesnokov

12 July 2014 20	Zhetysu	0 – 1	Ordabasy	Taldykorgan
18:30 (UTC+6)	Goa (yellow card) 45+1'; Kadio (yellow card) 62'; Rodionov (yellow card) 81'	Summary	Kúdela (yellow card) 60'; Kasyanov 63'; Junuzović (yellow card) 81'; Suyumbayev (yellow card) 90+1'	Stadium: Zhetysu Stadium; Attendance: 3,500; Referee: Igor Khisamutdinov

26 July 2014 21	Ordabasy	1 – 1	Taraz	Shymkent
18:00 (UTC+6)	T.Adyrbekov (yellow card) 30'; Nurgaliev (yellow card) 47'; Mukhtarov (yellow card) 62'; Kasyanov 71'; B.Beisenov (yellow card) 88'	Summary	O.Yarovenko 80' (yellow card) 83'	Stadium: Kazhimukan Munaitpasov Stadium; Attendance: 4,000; Referee: Anatolyi Vishnichenko

3 August 2014 22	Ordabasy	2 – 1	Kaisar	Shymkent
18:00 (UTC+6)	Klein 10' (o.g.); Tazhimbetov 33'	Summary	D.Dautov (yellow card) 49'; E.Altynbekov 89'	Stadium: Kazhimukan Munaitpasov Stadium; Attendance: 3,000; Referee: Aydin Rakhimbayev

===== League table =====
Pos	Team	Pld	W	D	L	GF	GA	GD	Pts	Qualification
3	Astana	22	10	9	3	34	17	+17	39	Qualification for the championship round
4	Shakhter Karagandy	22	11	3	8	33	27	+6	36	Qualification for the championship round
5	Ordabasy	22	10	5	7	24	22	+2	35	Qualification for the championship round
6	Kaisar	22	8	8	6	23	23	0	32	Qualification for the championship round
7	Zhetysu	22	7	6	9	15	18	−3	27	Qualification for the relegation round

Source: Soccerway (in Russian)
Rules for classification: 1st points;
Two team tiebreak: 1st overall wins; 2nd head-to-head record; 3rd goals difference; 4th goals scored; 5th away goals scored;
Multiple teams tiebreak: 1st overall wins; 2nd goals difference; 3rd goals scored; 4th away goals scored

==== Championship Round ====
===== Results summary =====
Overall								Home						Away					
Pld	W	D	L	GF	GA	GD	Pts	W	D	L	GF	GA	GD	W	D	L	GF	GA	GD
10	3	0	7	10	22	−12	9	1	0	4	5	9	−4	2	0	3	5	13	−8

Last updated: 16 December 2014.
Source: Soccerway

===== Results by round =====
Round	1	2	3	4	5	6	7	8	9	10
Ground	H	A	H	A	A	H	A	A	H	H
Result	L	L	L	W	W	L	L	L	W	L
Position	5	6	6	6	4	4	4	5	4	4

Source: Soccerway
A = Away; H = Home; W = Win; D = Draw; L = Loss

===== Results =====
29 August 2014 2	Ordabasy	0 – 1	Kaisar	Shymkent
17:30 (UTC+6)	Nurgaliev (yellow card) 53'	Summary	Furdui 45'; Hunt (yellow card) 70'	Stadium: Kazhimukan Munaitpasov Stadium; Attendance: 2,000; Referee: Askhat Abdanbayev

14 September 2014 3	Astana	5 – 0	Ordabasy	Astana
18:00 (UTC+6)	Twumasi 2', 74'; Kéthévoama 13', 84'; Nusserbayev 34' (yellow card) 55'; Aničić (yellow card) 80'	Summary	Aliev (yellow card) 16'; Suyumbayev (yellow card) 86'	Stadium: Astana Arena; Attendance: 2,500; Referee: Aleksandr Gauzer

20 September 2014 4	Ordabasy	0 – 1	Kairat	Shymkent
14:00 (UTC+6)	Ashirbekov (red card) 34'; Mwesigwa (yellow card) 55'	Summary	Michalík (red card) 34'; Yedigaryan (red card) 34'; Isael 72'	Stadium: Kazhimukan Munaitpasov Stadium; Attendance: 3,000; Referee: Igor Aleshin

28 September 2014 5	Shakhter Karagandy	2 – 3	Ordabasy	Karaganda
17:00 (UTC+6)	Maslo (yellow card) 45+1'; Topcagić 61', 90+1' (pen.); Pokrivač (yellow card) 76'; Vičius (yellow card) 88'	Summary	T.Adyrbekov (yellow card) 31'; Nurgaliev 42' (yellow card) 51'; Tungyshbayev 45'; B.Beisenov 68'	Stadium: Shakhter Stadium; Attendance: 3,000; Referee: Denis Izmailov

4 October 2014 6	Kaisar	0 – 1	Ordabasy	Kyzylorda
16:00 (UTC+6)	Coulibaly (yellow card) 11'; Nekhtiy (yellow card) 70'; Jablan (yellow card) 70'; R.Rozybakiev (yellow card) 80'	Summary	Kasyanov 45+2'; Tungyshbayev (yellow card) 72'; B.Beisenov (yellow card) 75'; Grigorenko (yellow card) 90+1'	Stadium: Gany Muratbayev Stadium; Attendance: 5,200; Referee: Bolat Karlibayev

18 October 2014 7	Ordabasy	1 – 2	Astana	Shymkent
16:00 (UTC+6)	Mwesigwa (yellow card) 27'; Tazhimbetov 65'; A.Diakate (yellow card) 68'; Kúdela (yellow card) 76'; B.Kozhabayev (yellow card) 80'	Summary	Kéthévoama 14'; Twumasi 57'; Erić (yellow card) 82'	Stadium: Kazhimukan Munaitpasov Stadium; Attendance: 3,000; Referee: Aleksandr Gauzer

22 October 2014 1	Aktobe	4 – 1	Ordabasy	Aktobe
19:00 (UTC+6)	Danilo Neco 30', 64'; Antonov (yellow card) 65'; Pizzelli 73'; Khairullin 86' (yellow card) 90+1'; Tagybergen (yellow card) 89'	Summary	Suyumbayev (yellow card) 33'; Ashirbekov 44'	Stadium: Central Stadium; Attendance: 5,000; Referee: Ruslan Duzmambetov
Note: Match originally scheduled for 22 August 2014.

26 October 2014 8	Kairat	2 – 0	Ordabasy	Almaty
18:00 (UTC+6)	Darabayev 13'; Riera 21'; Kuantayev (yellow card) 25'; V.Li (yellow card) 80'	Summary	Diakate (yellow card) 89'	Stadium: Central Stadium; Attendance: 9,000; Referee: Denis Izmailov

1 November 2014 9	Ordabasy	3 – 2	Shakhter Karagandy	Shymkent
15:00 (UTC+6)	Nurgaliev 18' (yellow card) 44'; Kasyanov 27'; Tazhimbetov 65'	Summary	Murtazayev 41' (yellow card) 76'; Baizhanov (yellow card) 50'; M.Gabyshev 82'	Stadium: Kazhimukan Munaitpasov Stadium; Attendance: 2,000; Referee: Aydin Rakhimbayev

9 November 2014 10	Ordabasy	1 – 3	Aktobe	Shymkent
15:00 (UTC+6)	Kasyanov (yellow card) 14'; Freire (yellow card) 36'; Mwesigwa (yellow card) 85'; Ashirbekov 87'	Summary	Anderson Mineiro (yellow card) 31'; Tagybergen (yellow card) 42'; Pizzelli 61'; Khairullin 67'; Korobkin 78'; Aimbetov (yellow card) 83'; Antonov (yellow card) 88'; D.Miroshnichenko (yellow card) 90+1'	Stadium: Kazhimukan Munaitpasov Stadium; Attendance: 2,000; Referee: Aleksandr Aliyev

===== Table =====
Pos	Team	Pld	W	D	L	GF	GA	GD	Pts	Qualification
2	Aktobe	32	17	10	5	52	31	+21	40	Qualification for the Europa League first qualifying round
3	Kairat	32	18	5	9	58	31	+27	38	Qualification for the Europa League first qualifying round
4	Ordabasy	32	13	5	14	34	44	−10	27	Qualification for the Europa League first qualifying round
5	Kaisar	32	10	13	9	30	34	−4	27	
6	Shakhter Karagandy	32	11	6	15	41	49	−8	21	

Source: Soccerway (in Russian)
Rules for classification: 1st points;
Two team tiebreak: 1st overall wins; 2nd head-to-head record; 3rd goals difference; 4th goals scored; 5th away goals scored;
Multiple teams tiebreak: 1st overall wins; 2nd goals difference; 3rd goals scored; 4th away goals scored.
Team start with half number of points from first round.

=== Kazakhstan Cup ===
23 April 2014 First Round	Ekibastuz	0 – 3	Ordabasy	Ekibastuz
16:00 (UTC+6)	Dyusembayev (yellow card) 52'; Kuanysheva (yellow card) 80'; A.Aimenov (yellow card) 90+2'	Summary	Nurgaliev 19' (pen.), 43', 52' (pen.); Aliyev (yellow card) 41'	Stadium: Shakhtyor Stadium; Attendance: 1,000; Referee: Stanislav Lesiv

14 May 2014 Second Round	Taraz	3 – 0	Ordabasy	Taraz
17:00 (UTC+6)	Kozhamberdi 15'; Ubbink 55'; Tleshev 63' (pen.)	Summary	Mukhtarov (yellow card) 36'; Irismetov; Tungyshbayev (yellow card) 89'	Stadium: Taraz Central Stadium; Attendance: 4,200; Referee: Igor Khisamutdinov

== Squad statistics ==
As of Match played 22 November 2014

=== Appearances and goals ===
No.	Pos	Nat	Player	Total		Premier League		Kazakhstan Cup	
No.	Pos	Nat	Player	Apps	Goals	Apps	Goals	Apps	Goals
1	GK	(Kazakhstan) KAZ	Aleksandr Grigorenko	29	0	26+1	0	2	0
2	DF	(Brazil) BRA	Freire	29	1	28	1	1	0
4	DF	(Kazakhstan) KAZ	Mukhtar Mukhtarov	23	0	21	0	2	0
5	DF	(Kazakhstan) KAZ	Gafurzhan Suyumbayev	30	0	30	0	0	0
6	MF	(Kazakhstan) KAZ	Piraliy Aliev	11	0	9+1	0	1	0
7	MF	(Kazakhstan) KAZ	Azat Nurgaliev	29	8	22+5	5	2	3
8	MF	(Kazakhstan) KAZ	Bekzat Beisenov	23	1	14+7	1	2	0
9	FW	(Kazakhstan) KAZ	Sergey Gridin	7	0	2+5	0	0	0
10	MF	(Kazakhstan) KAZ	Kairat Ashirbekov	29	4	26+3	4	0	0
11	MF	(Czech Republic) CZE	Ondřej Kúdela	14	0	14	0	0	0
12	MF	(Ukraine) UKR	Artem Kasyanov	29	7	26+3	7	0	0
14	DF	(Uganda) UGA	Andrew Mwesigwa	22	2	19+2	2	1	0
17	MF	(Kazakhstan) KAZ	Mardan Tolebek	26	1	5+19	1	1+1	0
18	FW	(Kazakhstan) KAZ	Daurenbek Tazhimbetov	26	3	11+13	3	1+1	0
21	MF	(Kazakhstan) KAZ	Yerkebulan Tungyshbayev	21	1	15+4	1	1+1	0
23	DF	(Kazakhstan) KAZ	Bakdaulet Kozhabayev	9	0	5+4	0	0	0
25	MF	(Senegal) SEN	Abdoulaye Diakate	32	2	31	2	1	0
27	GK	(Kazakhstan) KAZ	Andrei Tsvetkov	3	0	3	0	0	0
32	GK	(Kazakhstan) KAZ	Samat Otarbaev	4	0	3+1	0	0	0
38	MF	(Kazakhstan) KAZ	Ali Aliyev	2	0	0	0	1+1	0
39	FW	(Kazakhstan) KAZ	Maksim Filchakov	3	0	0+2	0	0+1	0
77	DF	(Kazakhstan) KAZ	Talgat Adyrbekov	14	0	14	0	0	0
	DF	(Kazakhstan) KAZ	Erlan Toyshybekov	1	0	0+1	0	0	0
	DF	(Kazakhstan) KAZ	Argen Manekeyev	1	0	0+1	0	0	0
Players who left Ordabasy on loan during the season:
	DF	(Kazakhstan) KAZ	Farkhadbek Irismetov	4	0	1+1	0	2	0
Players who appeared for Ordabasy that left during the season:
20	MF	(Kazakhstan) KAZ	Yevhen Levin	13	0	12	0	1	0
28	FW	(Croatia) CRO	Edin Junuzović	18	5	17	5	1	0
44	DF	(Serbia) SRB	Mladen Lazarević	1	0	0	0	1	0
89	FW	(Czech Republic) CZE	Pavel Černý	9	0	2+6	0	1	0
	MF	(Kazakhstan) KAZ	Kazbek Geteriev	12	0	7+3	0	1+1	0

=== Goal scorers ===
Place	Position	Nation	Number	Name	Premier League	Kazakhstan Cup	Total
1	FW	(Kazakhstan)	7	Azat Nurgaliev	5	3	8
2	MF	(Ukraine)	12	Artem Kasyanov	7	0	7
3	FW	(Croatia)	28	Edin Junuzović	5	0	5
4	MF	(Kazakhstan)	10	Kairat Ashirbekov	4	0	4
5	FW	(Kazakhstan)	18	Daurenbek Tazhimbetov	3	0	3
6	DF	(Uganda)	14	Andrew Mwesigwa	2	0	2
6	MF	(Senegal)	25	Abdoulaye Diakate	2	0	2
6				Own goal	2	0	2
9	MF	(Kazakhstan)	17	Mardan Tolebek	1	0	1
9	DF	(Brazil)	2	Freire	1	0	1
9	MF	(Kazakhstan)	21	Yerkebulan Tungyshbayev	1	0	1
9	MF	(Kazakhstan)	8	Bekzat Beisenov	1	0	1
				TOTALS	34	3	7

=== Disciplinary record ===
Number	Nation	Position	Name	Premier League		Kazakhstan Cup		Total	
Number	Nation	Position	Name	Yellow card	Red card	Yellow card	Red card	Yellow card	Red card
1	(Kazakhstan)	GK	Aleksandr Grigorenko	4	0	0	0	4	0
2	(Brazil)	DF	Freire	2	0	0	0	2	0
4	(Kazakhstan)	DF	Mukhtar Mukhtarov	5	0	1	0	6	0
5	(Kazakhstan)	DF	Gafurzhan Suyumbayev	6	0	0	0	6	0
6	(Kazakhstan)	MF	Piraliy Aliev	4	0	0	0	4	0
7	(Kazakhstan)	MF	Azat Nurgaliev	9	0	0	0	9	0
8	(Kazakhstan)	MF	Bekzat Beisenov	2	0	0	0	2	0
10	(Kazakhstan)	MF	Kairat Ashirbekov	5	1	0	0	5	1
11	(Czech Republic)	DF	Ondřej Kúdela	2	0	0	0	2	0
12	(Ukraine)	MF	Artem Kasyanov	7	0	0	0	7	0
14	(Uganda)	DF	Andrew Mwesigwa	5	0	0	0	5	0
21	(Kazakhstan)	MF	Yerkebulan Tungyshbayev	3	0	1	0	4	0
23	(Kazakhstan)	DF	Bakdaulet Kozhabayev	1	0	0	0	1	0
25	(Senegal)	MF	Abdoulaye Diakate	7	0	0	0	7	0
38	(Kazakhstan)	MF	Ali Aliyev	0	0	1	0	0	0
77	(Kazakhstan)	DF	Talgat Adyrbekov	2	0	0	0	2	0
Players away on loan:
2	(Kazakhstan)	DF	Farkhadbek Irismetov	0	0	1	0	0	0
Players who left Ordabasy during the season:
20	(Kazakhstan)	MF	Yevhen Levin	2	0	0	0	2	0
28	(Croatia)	FW	Edin Junuzović	2	0	0	0	2	0
	(Kazakhstan)	MF	Kazbek Geteriev	1	0	0	0	1	0
			TOTALS	69	1	4	0	73	1
