= Grigory Sartakov =

Kazakhstani footballer

Personal information
- Full name: Grigory Vyacheslavovich Sartakov
- Date of birth: 19 August 1994 (age 32)
- Place of birth: Pavlodar, Kazakhstan
- Height: 1.80 m (5 ft 11 in)
- Position: Defender

Senior career*
Years	Team	Apps	(Gls)
2009–2010	Spartak Semey	17	(0)
2011–2016	Irtysh Pavlodar	59	(1)
2017–2020	Tobol	33	(2)
2020	Irtysh Pavlodar	0	(0)
2020	Okzhetpes	0	(0)
2021–2022	Aksu	14	(1)

International career^{‡}
2017–	Kazakhstan	1	(0)
- * Club domestic league appearances and goals as of 21 January 2021 ‡ National team caps and goals as of 12 October 2017

Grigory Vyacheslavovich Sartakov (Russian: Григорий Вячеславович Сартаков; born 19 August 1994) is a Kazakh footballer who plays as a defender.

== Career ==
=== Club ===
On 13 January 2019, Sartakov signed a new two-year contract with FC Tobol. On 4 February 2020, Sartakov was released by Tobol. After spells at Irtysh Pavlodar and FC Okzhetpes in 2020, Sartakov joined FC Aksu in March 2021.

== Career statistics ==
=== Club ===
As of match played 7 April 2018

Appearances and goals by club, season and competition
Club	Season	League			National Cup		Continental		Other		Total	
Club	Season	Division	Apps	Goals	Apps	Goals	Apps	Goals	Apps	Goals	Apps	Goals
Spartak Semey	2013	First Division	17	0			-		1	0	18	0
Irtysh Pavlodar	2014	Premier League	13	0	1	0	–		–		14	0
Irtysh Pavlodar	2015	Premier League	31	1	1	0	–		–		32	1
Irtysh Pavlodar	2016	Premier League	15	0	3	0	–		–		18	0
Irtysh Pavlodar	Total		59	1	5	0	-	-	-	-	64	1
Tobol	2017	Premier League	30	2	1	0	-				31	2
Tobol	2018	Premier League	3	0	0	0	0	0	–		3	0
Tobol	2019	Premier League	0	0	0	0	0	0	–		0	0
Tobol	Total		33	2	1	0	0	0	-	-	34	2
Career total			109	3	6	0	-	-	1	0	116	3

=== International ===
Kazakhstan
Year	Apps	Goals
2017	1	0
Total	1	0

Statistics accurate as of match played 22 March 2017
