= 2017 FC Tobol season =

FC Tobol
2017 season
- Chairman: Nikolay Panin
- Manager: Omari Tetradze (until 27 June); Robert Yevdokimov (from 7 July)
- Stadium: Central Stadium
- Kazakhstan Premier League: 5th
- Kazakhstan Cup: Last 16 vs Shakhter Karagandy
- Top goalscorer: League: Aleksey Shchotkin (10); All: Aleksey Shchotkin (10)
Home colours	Away colours

The 2017 FC Tobol season is the 19th successive season that the club playing in the Kazakhstan Premier League, the highest tier of association football in Kazakhstan. Tobol will also play in the Kazakhstan Cup.

== Season events ==
On 27 June, Omari Tetradze resigned as manager, with Robert Yevdokimov taking over as manager on 7 July.

== Squad ==
As of 22 July 2017

Note: Flags indicate national team as defined under FIFA eligibility rules; some limited exceptions apply. Players may hold more than one non-FIFA nationality.

No.	Pos.	Nation	Player
1	GK	KAZ	Sultan Busurmanov
3	DF	MKD	Vanče Šikov
4	DF	CAF	Fernander Kassaï
5	DF	KAZ	Mark Gorman
6	MF	KAZ	Samat Zharynbektov
7	DF	KAZ	Dmitri Miroshnichenko
9	MF	KAZ	Nurbol Zhumaskaliyev
10	FW	ALB	Azdren Llullaku (loan from Astana)
11	MF	KGZ	Raul Jalilov
12	GK	UKR	Dmytro Nepohodov
15	FW	BIH	Amer Bekić
17	FW	KAZ	Zhasulan Moldakaraev

No.	Pos.	Nation	Player
18	DF	KAZ	Timur Zhakupov
19	DF	KAZ	Grigori Sartakov
20	MF	KAZ	Yevgeniy Levin
21	MF	GEO	Nika Kvekveskiri
22	MF	KAZ	Zhaslan Shubaev
23	MF	CZE	Egon Vůch
35	GK	KAZ	Stanislav Pavlov
44	MF	LTU	Artūras Žulpa
73	MF	KAZ	Didar Zhalmukan (loan from Astana)
77	MF	KAZ	Almir Mukhutdinov
99	FW	KAZ	Aleksey Shchotkin (loan from Astana)
—	FW	KAZ	Temirlan Elmurzaev

=== On Loan ===
Note: Flags indicate national team as defined under FIFA eligibility rules; some limited exceptions apply. Players may hold more than one non-FIFA nationality.

No.	Pos.	Nation	Player
8	DF	KAZ	Viktor Dmitrenko (at Shakhter Karagandy)

== Transfers ==
=== Winter ===
In: Note: Flags indicate national team as defined under FIFA eligibility rules; some limited exceptions apply. Players may hold more than one non-FIFA nationality.

No.	Pos.	Nation	Player
6	MF	KAZ	Samat Zharynbektov (from (Kazakhstan) Ekibastuz)
12	GK	UKR	Dmytro Nepohodov (from (Ukraine) Vorskla Poltava)
16	FW	KAZ	Toktar Zhangylyshbay (from (Kazakhstan) Zhetysu)
17	FW	KAZ	Zhasulan Moldakaraev (from (Kazakhstan) Altai Semey)
19	DF	KAZ	Grigori Sartakov (from (Kazakhstan) Irtysh Pavlodar)
20	MF	KAZ	Yevgeniy Levin (loan return from (Kazakhstan) Akzhayik)
25	DF	KAZ	Serhiy Malyi (loan from (Kazakhstan) Astana)
32	FW	SRB	Đorđe Despotović (loan from (Kazakhstan) Astana)
35	GK	KAZ	Stanislav Pavlov (from (Kazakhstan) Aktobe)
88	MF	KAZ	Askhat Tagybergen (loan from (Kazakhstan) Astana)
99	FW	KAZ	Aleksey Shchotkin (loan from (Kazakhstan) Astana)

Out: Note: Flags indicate national team as defined under FIFA eligibility rules; some limited exceptions apply. Players may hold more than one non-FIFA nationality.

No.	Pos.	Nation	Player
1	GK	KAZ	Vladimir Loginovsky (loan return to (Kazakhstan) Astana)
2	DF	KAZ	Rafkat Aslan (to (Kazakhstan) Aktobe)
6	MF	KAZ	Daniel Choi (to (Kazakhstan) Okzhetpes)
7	MF	KAZ	Timur Dosmagambetov (to (Kazakhstan) Okzhetpes)
9	FW	KAZ	Nurbol Zhumaskaliyev (to (Kazakhstan) Altai Semey)
10	FW	RUS	Shamil Asildarov (to (Russia) Anzhi Makhachkala)
19	MF	KAZ	Nurtas Kurgulin (to (Kazakhstan) Taraz)
22	MF	ROU	Ciprian Deac (to (Romania) CFR Cluj)
23	DF	UKR	Serhiy Yavorskyi (to (Ukraine) Illichivets Mariupol)
28	DF	KAZ	Anuar Agaysin
35	GK	KAZ	Aleksandr Petukhov
91	FW	KAZ	Sergei Khizhnichenko (to (Belarus) Shakhtyor Soligorsk)

=== Summer ===
In: Note: Flags indicate national team as defined under FIFA eligibility rules; some limited exceptions apply. Players may hold more than one non-FIFA nationality.

No.	Pos.	Nation	Player
3	DF	MKD	Vanče Šikov (from (North Macedonia) Rabotnički)
9	MF	KAZ	Nurbol Zhumaskaliyev (from (Kazakhstan) Irtysh Pavlodar)
10	FW	ALB	Azdren Llullaku (loan from (Kazakhstan) Astana)
15	FW	BIH	Amer Bekić (from (Bosnia and Herzegovina) Sarajevo)
21	MF	GEO	Nika Kvekveskiri (from (Azerbaijan) Gabala)
23	MF	CZE	Egon Vůch (from (Czech Republic) Viktoria Plzeň)
73	MF	KAZ	Didar Zhalmukan (loan from (Kazakhstan) Astana)
—	MF	KAZ	Evgeny Levin (loan from (Kazakhstan) Astana)

Out: Note: Flags indicate national team as defined under FIFA eligibility rules; some limited exceptions apply. Players may hold more than one non-FIFA nationality.

No.	Pos.	Nation	Player
3	MF	CRO	Denis Glavina (to (Kazakhstan) Akzhayik)
8	DF	KAZ	Viktor Dmitrenko (loan to (Kazakhstan) Shakhter Karagandy)
10	FW	MKD	Dušan Savić (to (Kazakhstan) Aktobe)
16	FW	KAZ	Toktar Zhangylyshbay (loan to (Kazakhstan) Kaisar)
25	DF	KAZ	Serhiy Malyi (loan return to (Kazakhstan) Astana)
32	FW	SRB	Đorđe Despotović (loan return to (Kazakhstan) Astana)
81	MF	AUT	Tomáš Šimkovič (to (Kazakhstan) Aktobe)
88	MF	KAZ	Askhat Tagybergen (loan return to (Kazakhstan) Astana)

== Competitions ==
=== Kazakhstan Premier League ===
==== Results summary ====
Overall								Home						Away					
Pld	W	D	L	GF	GA	GD	Pts	W	D	L	GF	GA	GD	W	D	L	GF	GA	GD
33	11	11	11	34	25	+9	44	8	8	1	24	8	+16	3	3	10	10	17	−7

Last updated: 5 November 2017.
Source: See Results

==== Results by round ====
Round	1	2	3	4	5	6	7	8	9	10	11	12	13	14	15	16	17	18	19	20	21	22	23	24	25	26	27	28	29	30	31	32	33
Ground	H	H	A	H	H	A	H	A	A	H	A	H	A	H	A	H	A	H	A	H	A	A	A	H	H	A	H	A	A	H	H	A	H
Result	W	D	L	W	W	D	D	D	W	D	L	D	W	W	L	D	L	L	W	W	L	L	L	D	W	W	D	L	L	D	W	D	W
Position	1	2	5	5	1	1	4	4	3	4	5	5	4	4	5	5	5	5	5	4	4	5	5	5	5	4	4	4	5	5	4	5	5

Source: See Results
A = Away; H = Home; W = Win; D = Draw; L = Loss

==== Results ====
8 March 2017 1	Tobol	3 – 0	Atyrau	Kostanay
14:00 (UTC+6)	Shchotkin 14', 58', 64'	Report	Lobjanidze (yellow card) 33'	Stadium: Stadion Zatobolets; Attendance: 3,500; Referee: Bagdat Abdullaev

12 March 2017 2	Tobol	0 – 0	Aktobe	Kostanay
14:00 (UTC+6)	Mukhutdinov (yellow card) 73'; Šimkovič (yellow card) 87'; Sartakov (yellow card) 90'	Report	A.Shurigin (yellow card) 24'; R.Aslan (yellow card) 31'; Shestakov (yellow card) 80'	Stadium: Stadion Zatobolets; Attendance: 4,000; Referee: Denis Tevyashov

18 March 2017 3	Okzhetpes	1 – 0	Tobol	Astana
14:00 (UTC+6)	Horvat 37'; Chertov (yellow card) 73'	Report	Moldakaraev (yellow card) 43'	Stadium: Astana Arena; Attendance: 2,300; Referee: Igor Aleshin

1 April 2017 4	Tobol	1 – 0	Taraz	Kostanay
14:00 (UTC+6)	Despotović 50' (yellow card) 79'; Šimkovič (red card) 88'	Report	A.Taubay (yellow card) 55'; Y.Seidakhmet (yellow card) 86'	Stadium: Stadion Zatobolets; Attendance: 2,500; Referee: Timur Kumashev

4 April 2017 18	Tobol	1 – 0	Ordabasy	Kostanay
16:30 (UTC+6)	Savić 18'; Kassaï (yellow card) 38'; Miroshnichenko (yellow card) 45+1'	Report	Rendulić (yellow card) 25'; Fontanello (yellow card) 45+1'	Stadium: Stadion Zatobolets; Attendance: 2,500; Referee: Denis Izmailov

8 April 2017 5	Kaisar	0 – 0	Tobol	Kyzylorda
16:00 (UTC+6)	Narzildaev (yellow card) 45+1'; Kamara (yellow card) 63'	Report	Miroshnichenko (yellow card) 38'; Moldakaraev (yellow card) 82'	Stadium: Gani Muratbayev Stadium; Attendance: 3,640; Referee: Artyom Kuchin

12 April 2017 6	Tobol	2 – 2	Kairat	Kostanay
17:30 (UTC+6)	Despotović (yellow card) 46'; Shchotkin 52'; Malyi 83'; Miroshnichenko (yellow card) 85'	Report	Iličević 19'; Gohou 41'; Kuat (yellow card) 60'	Stadium: Stadion Zatobolets; Attendance: 4,000; Referee: Igor Chesnokov

16 April 2017 7	Shakhter Karagandy	1 – 1	Tobol	Temirtau
15:00 (UTC+6)	Tazhimbetov 47' (yellow card) 90+3'; Kadio (red card) 90+3'	Report	Dmitrenko (yellow card) 22'; Skorykh 45+3' (o.g.); Moldakaraev (yellow card) 73'; Malyi (yellow card) 90+3'; Shchotkin (red card) 90+3'	Stadium: Metallurg Stadium; Attendance: 1,000; Referee: Bolat Karlibayev

23 April 2017 8	Ordabasy	1 – 2	Tobol	Shymkent
16:00 (UTC+6)	Kovalchuk 45'; T.Erlanov (yellow card) 70'	Report	Zhangylyshbay (yellow card) 20' (goal) 63'; Dmitrenko (yellow card) 44'; Despotović 68'	Stadium: Kazhymukan Munaitpasov Stadium; Attendance: 4,500; Referee: Aleksei Bobrov

29 April 2017 9	Tobol	0 – 0	Irtysh Pavlodar	Kostanay
16:00 (UTC+6)	Sartakov (yellow card) 43'	Report	A.Darabayev (yellow card) 74'; I.Kalinin (yellow card) 83'	Stadium: Stadion Zatobolets; Attendance: 2,000; Referee: Bolat Karlibayev

2 May 2017 10	Akzhayik	1 – 0	Tobol	Oral
18:00 (UTC+6)	B.Omarov (yellow card) 24'; Sergienko 76'	Report	T.Zhakupov (yellow card) 29'; Sartakov (yellow card) 75'; Dmitrenko (yellow card) 90+1'	Stadium: Petr Atoyan Stadium; Attendance: 2,000; Referee: Bagdat Abdullaev

6 May 2017 11	Tobol	0 – 0	Astana	Kostanay
16:00 (UTC+6)	Shchotkin 71'	Report	Llullaku (yellow card) 63'; Kabananga 75'	Stadium: Stadion Zatobolets; Attendance: 2,000; Referee: Aydin Rakhimbayev

14 May 2017 12	Aktobe	1 – 3	Tobol	Aktobe
19:00 (UTC+6)	B.Baitana (yellow card) 72'; Mamute 77'	Report	Tagybergen (yellow card) 8'; Shchotkin 41'; Malyi 48'; R.Jalilov 52'	Stadium: Central Stadium; Attendance: 7,000; Referee: Igor Aleshin

20 May 2017 13	Tobol	5 – 1	Okzhetpes	Kostanay
16:00 (UTC+6)	Sartakov 35'; Shchotkin 41', 90+6' (pen.); Mukhutdinov (yellow card) 58'; Despotović 60'; Malyi (red card) 72'; R.Jalilov 90+2'	Report	O.Nedashkovsky (yellow card) 24'; A.Kuksin (yellow card) 34' (red card) 90+5'; Strukov (yellow card) 47'; Dosmagambetov (yellow card) 86'; Horvat 90+1'	Stadium: Stadion Zatobolets; Attendance: 2,000; Referee: Denis Izmailov

27 May 2017 14	Taraz	1 – 0	Tobol	Taraz
18:00 (UTC+6)	Shipitsin (yellow card) 31'; Azovskiy (yellow card) 71'; T.Bayzhanov 82'	Report	Glavina (yellow card) 22'; Sartakov (yellow card) 41'; Moldakaraev (yellow card) 56'	Stadium: Central Stadium; Attendance: 4,000; Referee: Furkat Atajanov

3 June 2017 15	Tobol	0 – 0	Kaisar	Kostanay
16:00 (UTC+6)	S.Zharynbektov (yellow card) 45+1'; T.Zhakupov (yellow card) 54'	Report	Ntibazonkiza (yellow card) 12'; A.Zhakhayev (yellow card) 29'; I.Graf (yellow card) 60'	Stadium: Stadion Zatobolets; Attendance: 2,000; Referee: Aleksandr Aliyev

17 June 2017 16	Kairat	2 – 0	Tobol	Almaty
18:30 (UTC+6)	Islamkhan 64' (pen.); Isael 85'	Report		Stadium: Central Stadium; Attendance: 7,100; Referee: Denis Tevyashov

25 June 2017 17	Tobol	1 – 2	Shakhter Karagandy	Kostanay
19:00 (UTC+6)	Sartakov 27'; Miroshnichenko (yellow card) 43'; Zhangylyshbay (yellow card) 87'	Report	Shakhmetov (yellow card) 26' (goal) 80'; Stojanović 33'; Szöke (yellow card) 43'	Stadium: Stadion Zatobolets; Attendance: 2,000; Referee: Daniyar Sakhi

10 July 2017 19	Irtysh Pavlodar	0 – 1	Tobol	Pavlodar
20:00 (UTC+6)	I.Kalinin (yellow card) 4'; Geteriev (yellow card) 14'; Kislitsyn (yellow card) 39'; Shabalin (yellow card) 66'	Report	Sartakov (yellow card) 70'; Fonseca 82' (o.g.)	Stadium: Central Stadium; Attendance: 4,000; Referee: Denis Izmailov

15 July 2017 20	Tobol	2 – 0	Akzhayik	Kostanay
18:00 (UTC+6)	R.Jalilov (yellow card) 52'; Kassaï 70'; Moldakaraev 74'; Sartakov (yellow card) 75'	Report	Nikolić (yellow card) 74'; Odibe (yellow card) 77'; D.Schmidt (yellow card) 82'	Stadium: Stadion Zatobolets; Attendance: 1,850; Referee: Grigory Moskovchenko

21 July 2017 21	Astana	2 – 0	Tobol	Astana
18:00 (UTC+6)	Shomko (yellow card) 26'; Twumasi 43', 70'; Aničić (yellow card) 59'	Report	S.Zharynbektov (yellow card) 45'; Moldakaraev (yellow card) 57'; Kvekveskiri (yellow card) 69'	Stadium: Astana Arena; Attendance: 3,500; Referee: Askhat Abdanbayev

29 July 2017 22	Atyrau	1 – 0	Tobol	Atyrau
20:00 (UTC+6)	Ablitarov (yellow card) 7'; Dvalishvili (yellow card) 13'; Sikimić 28' (yellow card) 62'; Narzikulov (yellow card) 45'; Đokić (yellow card) 47' (yellow-red card) 80'	Report	Mukhutdinov (yellow card) 13'; Sartakov (yellow card) 41'	Stadium: Munaishy Stadium; Attendance: 3,500; Referee: Aleksandr Aliyev

12 August 2017 23	Kaisar	1 – 0	Tobol	Kyzylorda
18:30 (UTC+6)	D.Yevstigneyev (yellow card) 11'; Korobkin (yellow card) 23'; Coureur (yellow card) 38'; Dja Djédjé 55'; Grigorenko (yellow card) 90+1'	Report	Mukhutdinov (yellow card) 4'	Stadium: Gani Muratbayev Stadium; Attendance: 1,500; Referee: Marat Iskakov

20 August 2017 24	Tobol	1 – 1	Taraz	Kostanay
18:00 (UTC+6)	Miroshnichenko (yellow card) 24'; Moldakaraev (yellow card) 57'; D.Zhalmukan (yellow card) 65'; Kvekveskiri 72' (pen.); Šikov (yellow card) 90+5'	Report	B.Shadmanov (yellow card) 32' (yellow-red card) 70'; Gorbanets (yellow card) 70'; Mané 77'	Stadium: Central Stadium; Attendance: 6,300; Referee: Bolat Saryev

26 August 2017 25	Tobol	2 – 0	Akzhayik	Kostanay
18:00 (UTC+6)	Moldakaraev 12'; D.Zhalmukan (yellow card) 58'; S.Zharynbektov 83'	Report	K.Zarechny (yellow card) 21'	Stadium: Central Stadium; Attendance: 3,000; Referee: Artyom Kuchin

10 September 2017 26	Irtysh Pavlodar	1 – 2	Tobol	Pavlodar
15:00 (UTC+6)	Stamenković (yellow card) 66'; Kvekveskiri 73' (o.g.)	Report	Mukhutdinov (yellow card) 27'; Shchotkin 41'; Šikov (yellow card) 54'; Kassaï 82'; Miroshnichenko (yellow card) 86'	Stadium: Central Stadium; Attendance: 2,500; Referee: Timur Kumashev

16 September 2017 27	Tobol	0 – 0	Ordabasy	Kostanay
18:00 (UTC+6)	Žulpa (yellow card) 37' (yellow-red card) 79'; Šikov (yellow card) 49'; D.Zhalmukan (yellow card) 65'	Report	Nusserbayev (yellow card) 44'	Stadium: Central Stadium; Attendance: 5,000; Referee: Ruslan Omarov

20 September 2017 30	Aktobe	1 – 0	Tobol	Aktobe
20:00 (UTC+6)	Nane 44'; Volovyk (yellow card) 51'	Report	Mukhutdinov (yellow card) 66'; Moldakaraev (yellow card) 71' (yellow-red card) 83'; Miroshnichenko (yellow card) 90+4'	Stadium: Central Stadium; Attendance: 6,500; Referee: Igor Chesnokov

24 September 2017 28	Kairat	2 – 0	Tobol	Almaty
15:00 (UTC+6)	Gohou 3'; Suyumbayev (yellow card) 68'; Isael 79'	Report		Stadium: Central Stadium; Attendance: 5,500; Referee: Bagdat Abdullaev

1 October 2017 29	Tobol	1 – 1	Astana	Kostanay
15:00 (UTC+6)	Moldakaraev 33'	Report	Tagybergen (yellow card) 34'; Shomko 41' (yellow card) 51'; Shitov (yellow card) 86'	Stadium: Central Stadium; Attendance: 2,500; Referee: Daniyar Sakhi

22 October 2017 31	Tobol	4 – 1	Okzhetpes	Kostanay
16:00 (UTC+6)	Moldakaraev 1'; Vůch 15', 32', 74'	Report	Dosmagambetov (yellow card) 70'; O.Nedashkovsky 88'	Stadium: Central Stadium; Attendance: 7,000; Referee: Aydin Rakhimbayev

28 October 2017 32	Shakhter Karagandy	1 – 1	Tobol	Karaganda
15:00 (UTC+6)	I.Pikalkin (yellow card) 70'; Chleboun (yellow card) 72' (yellow-red card) 86'; Stojanović 83' (pen.); A.Tattybaev (yellow card) 84'; M.Gabyshev (yellow card) 90+4'	Report	Moldakaraev 10'; D.Zhalmukan (yellow card) 41'; Žulpa (yellow card) 68'	Stadium: Shakhter Stadium; Attendance: 1,500; Referee: Aleksandr Gauzer

5 November 2017 33	Tobol	2 – 0	Atyrau	Kostanay
15:00 (UTC+6)	Shchotkin 10'; Moldakaraev (yellow card) 14'; Žulpa 62'	Report		Stadium: Central Stadium; Attendance: 7,000; Referee: Timur Kumashev

==== League table ====
Pos	Team	Pld	W	D	L	GF	GA	GD	Pts	Qualification or relegation
3	Ordabasy	33	18	4	11	44	37	+7	58	
4	Irtysh Pavlodar	33	12	12	9	35	32	+3	48	Qualification for the Europa League first qualifying round (Note: Ordabasy would have qualified too, but they failed to obtain a licence, so Tobol took their place.)
5	Tobol	33	12	11	10	36	26	+10	47	Qualification for the Europa League first qualifying round
6	Kaisar	33	11	9	13	30	36	−6	42	
7	Shakhter Karagandy	33	12	4	17	36	50	−14	40	

Source: UEFA, Soccerway
Rules for classification: 1) Points; 2) Head-to-head points; 3) Head-to-head matches won; 4) Head-to-head goal difference; 5) Head-to-head goals scored; 6) Head-to-head away goals scored; 7) Goal difference; 8) Matches won; 9) Goals scored; 10) Away goals scored; 11) Draw.

=== Kazakhstan Cup ===
19 April 2017 Last 16	Tobol	1 – 2	Shakhter Karagandy	Kostanay
17:30 (UTC+6)	Kassaï (yellow card) 37'; Zhangylyshbay 85'	Summary	Szöke 15'; A.Tattybaev 39'; Skorykh (yellow card) 83'	Stadium: Central Stadium; Attendance: 2,000; Referee: Bagdat Abdullaev

== Squad statistics ==
As of Match played 5 November 2017

=== Appearances and goals ===
No.	Pos	Nat	Player	Total		Premier League		Kazakhstan Cup	
No.	Pos	Nat	Player	Apps	Goals	Apps	Goals	Apps	Goals
3	DF	(North Macedonia) MKD	Vanče Šikov	13	0	13	0	0	0
4	DF	(Central African Republic) CAF	Fernander Kassaï	32	2	29+2	2	1	0
5	DF	(Kazakhstan) KAZ	Mark Gorman	1	0	1	0	0	0
6	MF	(Kazakhstan) KAZ	Samat Zharynbektov	17	1	6+11	1	0	0
7	DF	(Kazakhstan) KAZ	Dmitri Miroshnichenko	23	0	22	0	1	0
9	MF	(Kazakhstan) KAZ	Nurbol Zhumaskaliyev	10	0	5+5	0	0	0
10	FW	(Albania) ALB	Azdren Llullaku	13	0	11+2	0	0	0
11	MF	(Kyrgyzstan) KGZ	Raul Jalilov	23	2	9+13	2	0+1	0
12	GK	(Ukraine) UKR	Dmytro Nepohodov	34	0	33	0	1	0
15	FW	(Bosnia and Herzegovina) BIH	Amer Bekić	4	0	1+3	0	0	0
17	FW	(Kazakhstan) KAZ	Zhasulan Moldakaraev	30	5	19+10	5	1	0
18	DF	(Kazakhstan) KAZ	Timur Zhakupov	15	0	10+4	0	0+1	0
19	DF	(Kazakhstan) KAZ	Grigori Sartakov	31	2	28+2	2	1	0
21	MF	(Georgia (country)) GEO	Nika Kvekveskiri	14	1	13+1	1	0	0
23	MF	(Czech Republic) CZE	Egon Vůch	12	3	10+2	3	0	0
44	MF	(Lithuania) LTU	Artūras Žulpa	25	1	21+3	1	1	0
73	MF	(Kazakhstan) KAZ	Didar Zhalmukan	11	0	11	0	0	0
77	MF	(Kazakhstan) KAZ	Almir Mukhutdinov	28	0	27	0	1	0
99	FW	(Kazakhstan) KAZ	Aleksey Shchotkin	29	10	26+2	10	1	0
Players away from Tobol on loan:
8	DF	(Kazakhstan) KAZ	Viktor Dmitrenko	11	0	9+2	0	0	0
Players who left Tobol during the season:
3	MF	(Croatia) CRO	Denis Glavina	6	0	4+2	0	0	0
9	FW	(Kazakhstan) KAZ	Temirlan Elmurzaev	4	0	0+4	0	0	0
10	FW	(North Macedonia) MKD	Dušan Savić	13	1	9+4	1	0	0
16	FW	(Kazakhstan) KAZ	Toktar Zhangylyshbay	11	2	4+6	1	0+1	1
25	DF	(Kazakhstan) KAZ	Serhiy Malyi	15	2	14	2	1	0
32	FW	(Serbia) SRB	Đorđe Despotović	17	3	15+1	3	1	0
81	MF	(Austria) AUT	Tomáš Šimkovič	7	0	5+1	0	1	0
88	MF	(Kazakhstan) KAZ	Askhat Tagybergen	10	0	9+1	0	0	0

=== Goal scorers ===
Place	Position	Nation	Number	Name	Premier League	Kazakhstan Cup	Total
1	FW	(Kazakhstan)	99	Aleksey Shchotkin	10	0	10
2	FW	(Kazakhstan)	17	Zhasulan Moldakaraev	5	0	5
3	FW	(Serbia)	32	Đorđe Despotović	3	0	3
3	MF	(Czech Republic)	23	Egon Vůch	3	0	3
5	MF	(Kazakhstan)	25	Serhiy Malyi	2	0	2
5	FW	(Kazakhstan)	16	Toktar Zhangylyshbay	1	1	2
5	MF	(Kyrgyzstan)	11	Raul Jalilov	2	0	2
5	DF	(Kazakhstan)	19	Grigori Sartakov	2	0	2
5	DF	(Central African Republic)	4	Fernander Kassaï	2	0	2
5				Own goal	2	0	2
10	FW	(North Macedonia)	10	Dušan Savić	1	0	1
10	MF	(Georgia (country))	21	Nika Kvekveskiri	1	0	1
10	MF	(Kazakhstan)	6	Samat Zharynbektov	1	0	1
10	MF	(Lithuania)	44	Artūras Žulpa	1	0	1
				TOTALS	36	1	37

=== Disciplinary record ===
Number	Nation	Position	Name	Premier League		Kazakhstan Cup		Total	
Number	Nation	Position	Name	Yellow card	Red card	Yellow card	Red card	Yellow card	Red card
3	(Croatia)	MF	Denis Glavina	1	0	0	0	1	0
3	(North Macedonia)	DF	Vanče Šikov	3	0	0	0	3	0
4	(Central African Republic)	DF	Fernander Kassaï	1	0	1	0	2	0
6	(Kazakhstan)	MF	Samat Zharynbektov	2	0	0	0	2	0
7	(Kazakhstan)	DF	Dmitri Miroshnichenko	7	0	0	0	7	0
8	(Kazakhstan)	DF	Viktor Dmitrenko	3	0	0	0	3	0
11	(Kyrgyzstan)	MF	Raul Jalilov	1	0	0	0	1	0
16	(Kazakhstan)	FW	Toktar Zhangylyshbay	2	0	0	0	2	0
17	(Kazakhstan)	FW	Zhasulan Moldakaraev	9	1	0	0	9	1
18	(Kazakhstan)	DF	Timur Zhakupov	2	0	0	0	2	0
19	(Kazakhstan)	DF	Grigori Sartakov	7	0	0	0	7	0
21	(Georgia (country))	MF	Nika Kvekveskiri	1	0	0	0	1	0
25	(Kazakhstan)	DF	Serhiy Malyi	1	1	0	0	1	1
32	(Serbia)	FW	Đorđe Despotović	2	0	0	0	2	0
44	(Lithuania)	MF	Artūras Žulpa	3	1	0	0	3	1
73	(Kazakhstan)	MF	Didar Zhalmukan	4	0	0	0	4	0
77	(Kazakhstan)	MF	Almir Mukhutdinov	6	0	0	0	6	0
81	(Austria)	MF	Tomáš Šimkovič	1	1	0	0	1	1
88	(Kazakhstan)	MF	Askhat Tagybergen	1	0	0	0	1	0
99	(Kazakhstan)	FW	Aleksey Shchotkin	0	1	0	0	0	1
			TOTALS	57	0	1	0	58	4
