= Kostyantyn Dudchenko =

Ukrainian professional football player

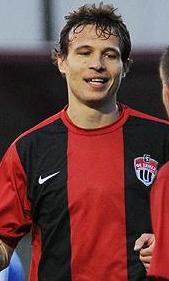

Personal information
- Date of birth: 8 July 1986 (age 40)
- Place of birth: Melitopol, Ukrainian SSR, Soviet Union
- Height: 1.95 m (6 ft 5 in)
- Position: Forward

Youth career
- 1999–2005: SC Olkom Melitopol

Senior career*
Years	Team	Apps	(Gls)
2005–2008	Olkom Melitopol	95	(23)
2009	Dynamo Kyiv (reserves)		
2010	Khimki	31	(7)
2011–2014	Shinnik	80	(13)
2014–2015	Irtysh	42	(19)
2016	Tobol	11	(2)
2016–2017	Akzhayik	35	(6)
2018	Taraz	0	(0)
- * Club domestic league appearances and goals as of 09:19, 1 March 2018 (UTC)

Kostyantyn Dudchenko (Ukrainian: Костянтин Олександрович Дудченко; born 8 July 1986) is a Ukrainian professional football player who played in the Kazakhstan First Division for Taraz.

== Career ==
He scored a winning goal in his debut with FC Khimki on 28 March 2010 in a 1–0 win against FC Salyut Belgorod.

In March 2014, Dudchenko moved from FC Shinnik Yaroslavl to FC Irtysh Pavlodar in the Kazakhstan Premier League.

Dudchenko left FC Tobol on 13 June 2016.

== Career statistics ==
=== Club ===
As of match played 9 November 2017

Appearances and goals by club, season and competition
Club	Season	League			National Cup		Continental		Other		Total	
Club	Season	Division	Apps	Goals	Apps	Goals	Apps	Goals	Apps	Goals	Apps	Goals
Khimki	2010	Russian Football National League	31	7			–		–		31	7
Shinnik Yaroslavl	2011–12	Russian Football National League	35	3	2	0	–		0	0	37	3
Shinnik Yaroslavl	2012–13	Russian Football National League	24	4	1	0	–		–		25	4
Shinnik Yaroslavl	2013–14	Russian Football National League	20	6	2	0	–		–		22	6
Shinnik Yaroslavl	Total		79	13	6	0	-	-	-	-	85	13
Irtysh Pavlodar	2014	Kazakhstan Premier League	21	11	2	0	–		–		23	11
Irtysh Pavlodar	2015	Kazakhstan Premier League	21	8	0	0	–		–		21	8
Irtysh Pavlodar	Total		42	19	2	0	-	-	-	-	44	19
Tobol	2016	Kazakhstan Premier League	11	2	1	0	–		–		12	2
Akzhayik	2016	Kazakhstan Premier League	17	4	0	0	–		–		17	4
Akzhayik	2017	Kazakhstan Premier League	18	2	0	0	–		1	2	19	4
Akzhayik	Total		35	6	0	0	-	-	1	2	36	8
Career total			198	47	8	0	-	-	1	2	207	49
