= Leandro Freire =

Brazilian footballer

Personal information
- Full name: Leandro Freire de Araújo
- Date of birth: 21 August 1989 (age 37)
- Place of birth: Presidente Prudente, Brazil
- Height: 1.87 m (6 ft 1 1/2 in)
- Position: Centre back

Senior career*
Years	Team	Apps	(Gls)
- União São João
2009	Paraná Clube	14	(0)
2009	Sport Club Recife	5	(0)
2010	União São João		
2010–2014	Vitória	32	(2)
2014–2015	Nacional	8	(0)
2014	→ Ordabasy (loan)	28	(1)
2015–2016	Apollon Limassol	33	(3)
2016	Chaves	18	(0)
2017–2018	Shimizu S-Pulse	40	(0)
2019	Shonan Bellmare	16	(2)
2020–2021	V-Varen Nagasaki	36	(2)
2022	FC Gifu	15	(0)
2023	Grêmio Prudente	17	(1)
- * Club domestic league appearances and goals as of 29 April 2023

Leandro Freire de Araújo (born 21 August 1989), sometimes known as just Freire, is a Brazilian football player who plays as a defender.

== Career ==
Previously he played for Vitória S.C. in the Primeira Liga.

On 28 March 2014, Freire signed for Kazakhstan Premier League side FC Ordabasy on a season-long-loan deal, returning to Nacional in January 2015.

On 14 February 2017, Freire was announced as a new signing for J.League side Shimizu S-Pulse.

== Career statistics ==
As of 23 May 2021

Club	Season	League			National Cup		League Cup		Continental		Other		Total	
Club	Season	Division	Apps	Goals	Apps	Goals	Apps	Goals	Apps	Goals	Apps	Goals	Apps	Goals
Vitória	2010–11	Primeira Liga	11	0	4	0	2	0	–		–		17	0
Vitória	2011–12	Primeira Liga	7	1	0	0	2	0	0	0	–		9	1
Vitória	2012–13	Primeira Liga	9	1	3	1	2	0	–		–		14	2
Vitória	2013–14	Primeira Liga	5	0	0	0	0	0	1	0	0	0	6	0
Vitória	Total		32	2	7	1	6	0	1	0	0	0	46	3
Nacional	2013–14	Primeira Liga	0	0	0	0	0	0	–		–		0	0
Nacional	2014–15	Primeira Liga	8	0	1	0	0	0	–		–		9	0
Nacional	Total		8	0	1	0	0	0	0	0	0	0	9	0
Ordabasy (loan)	2014	Kazakhstan Premier League	28	1	1	0	–		–		–		29	1
Apollon Limassol	2015–16	Cypriot First Division	33	3	7	0	–		6	0	–		46	3
Chaves	2016–17	Primeira Liga	18	0	3	0	0	0	–		–		21	0
Shimizu S-Pulse	2017	J1 League	11	0	1	0	2	0	–		–		14	0
Shimizu S-Pulse	2018	J1 League	29	0	2	0	1	0	–		–		32	0
Shimizu S-Pulse	Total		40	0	3	0	3	0	0	0	0	0	46	0
Shonan Bellmare	2019	J1 League	16	2	1	0	2	0	–		–		19	2
V-Varen Nagasaki	2020	J2 League	24	1	–		–		–		–		24	1
V-Varen Nagasaki	2021	J2 League	12	1	1	0	–		–		–		13	1
V-Varen Nagasaki	Total		36	2	1	0	0	0	0	0	0	0	37	2
Career total			211	10	24	1	11	0	7	0	0	0	253	11

== Honours ==
Vitória de Guimarães

- Taça de Portugal: 2012–13

Apollon

- Cypriot Cup: 2015–16
