= Miroslav Lečić =

Serbian footballer

Personal information
- Full name: Miroslav Lečić
- Date of birth: 20 April 1985 (age 41)
- Place of birth: Belgrade, SFR Yugoslavia
- Height: 1.84 m (6 ft 1/2 in)
- Position: Striker

Youth career
- Red Star Belgrade

Senior career*
Years	Team	Apps	(Gls)
2003–2007	Red Star Belgrade	1	(0)
2003–2004	→ Radnički Obrenovac (loan)	18	(4)
2004–2005	→ Jedinstvo Ub (loan)	26	(6)
2005–2006	→ Mladost Apatin (loan)	21	(4)
2006	→ Palić (loan)	9	(4)
2007	→ Mladost Apatin (loan)	9	(0)
2007	→ Radnički Obrenovac (loan)	9	(8)
2008–2009	Bonifika	14	(4)
2009	Radnički Obrenovac	14	(10)
2010	Universitatea Cluj	3^{+}	(1^{+})
2010	Otopeni	6	(0)
2011	Bežanija	32	(9)
2012–2013	Taraz	46	(10)
2015	Donji Srem	9	(6)
2016	Jagodina	13	(6)
2016	Akzhayik	16	(5)
2017	Jagodina	15	(10)
2017	Zemun	17	(3)
2018	Metalac Gornji Milanovac	7	(1)
2018	Kyzylzhar	12	(2)

International career
2002	FR Yugoslavia U17	7	(3)
2003	Serbia and Montenegro U19	3	(2)
- * Club domestic league appearances and goals as of 18 November 2018

Miroslav Lečić (Serbian Cyrillic: Мирослав Лечић; born 20 April 1985) is a Serbian professional footballer who plays as a striker.

== Club career ==
Lečić started out at Red Star Belgrade, making one league appearance for the senior squad in the 2004–05 season. He was also sent out on loan to Radnički Obrenovac (twice), Jedinstvo Ub, Mladost Apatin (twice), and Palić. In early 2008, Lečić moved to Slovenia and joined Second League club Bonifika. He spent the next 18 months there, before returning to his country and joining his former club Radnički Obrenovac. In the 2010 winter transfer window, Lečić moved abroad for the second time and signed with Romanian side Universitatea Cluj. He also played for fellow Liga II club Otopeni, before returning to his homeland in early 2011, signing with Bežanija. Over the following years, Lečić would go on to play for three clubs in Kazakhstan (Taraz, Akzhayik, and Kyzylzhar) and four domestic clubs (Donji Srem, Jagodina twice, Zemun, and Metalac Gornji Milanovac), scoring over 40 league goals in the process.

== International career ==
Lečić represented FR Yugoslavia at the 2002 UEFA European Under-17 Championship. He also played for Serbia and Montenegro at under-19 level.
