= Ihor Chuchman =

Kazakhstani football defender

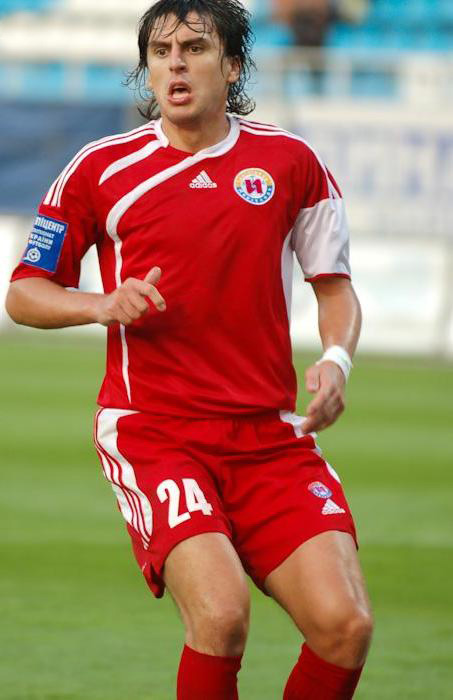

Personal information
- Full name: Ihor Romanovych Chuchman
- Date of birth: 15 February 1985 (age 41)
- Place of birth: Lviv, Ukrainian SSR, Soviet Union
- Height: 1.90 m (6 ft 3 in)
- Position: Centre back

Senior career*
Years	Team	Apps	(Gls)
2001–2004	Dynamo Kyiv	0	(0)
2001–2002	→ Borysfen-2 Boryspil (loan)	15	(0)
2002–2004	→ Dynamo-3 Kyiv	52	(1)
2004	→ Dynamo-2 Kyiv	9	(0)
2005–2006	Zakarpattia Uzhhorod	26	(1)
2006	Karpaty Lviv	0	(0)
2007	Zakarpattia Uzhhorod	19	(0)
2008–2010	Illychivets Mariupol	64	(1)
2011	Zakarpattia Uzhhorod	4	(0)
2012	Okzhetpes	25	(0)
2013–2014	Irtysh Pavlodar	29	(0)

International career
2000–2002	Ukraine U17	10	(0)
- * Club domestic league appearances and goals

Ihor Chuchman (Ukrainian: Ігор Романович Чучман; born 15 February 1985) is a Ukrainian former football defender.

He transferred to Illychivets Mariupol during the 2007–08 winter transfer season from FC Zakarpattia Uzhhorod.
