= Saulius Širmelis =

Lithuanian football coach

Personal information
- Date of birth: 31 May 1956 (age 70)
- Place of birth: Biržai, Lithuanian SSR

Managerial career
- Years: Team
- 1994–1995: Ukmerge
- 1995–1997: Panerys Vilnius
- 1998–1999: Polonia Vilnius
- 2000–2003: FBK Kaunas
- 2003–2004: Ventspils
- 2005: Žalgiris Vilnius
- 2005–2006: 1. Tatran Prešov
- 2008–2009: Ekranas
- 2008–2009: Lithuania (Assistant Manager)
- 2009: Atlantis
- 2010: Atletas Kaunas
- 2011: Šiauliai
- 2011–2012: Akzhayik
- 2014–2015: Kazakhstan U21
- 2014: Ordabasy
- 2016: Jelgava
- 2017: Shakhter Karagandy
- 2019: AFC Eskilstuna
- 2020: FK Sūduva

Saulius Širmelis (born 31 May 1956) is a Lithuanian football coach.

== Career ==
On 2 June 2017, Širmelis was appointed as the new manager of Shakhter Karagandy.

Širmelis was appointed manager of Swedish club AFC Eskilstuna on 5 September 2019. On 4 November 2019, he left the club again.

On 23 May 2020, Širmelis was appointed as the head coach of the Lithuanian defending champions FK Sūduva.
