= Miodrag Džudović =

Montenegrin footballer

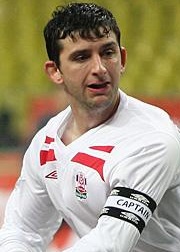
- Džudović playing with Spartak Nalchik in 2009

Personal information
- Date of birth: 6 September 1979 (age 47)
- Place of birth: Plav, SFR Yugoslavia
- Height: 1.97 m (6 ft 6 in)
- Position: Centre back

Team information
- Current team: Sheriff Tiraspol (head coach)

Senior career*
Years	Team	Apps	(Gls)
1999–2003	Jezero Plav	48	(4)
2003	Jedinstvo Bijelo Polje	14	(2)
2003	OFK Beograd	1	(0)
2004–2005	Volyn Lutsk	38	(1)
2006–2013	Spartak Nalchik	185	(6)
2014	Irtysh Pavlodar	26	(1)
Total		312	(14)

International career
2008–2013	Montenegro	26	(1)

Managerial career
- 2015–2019: Montenegro (assistant)
- 2018: Budućnost Podgorica (caretaker)
- 2019: Montenegro (caretaker)
- 2022–2023: Budućnost Podgorica
- 2024–2026: Jezero
- 2026–: Sheriff Tiraspol
- * Club domestic league appearances and goals

Miodrag Džudović (Serbian Cyrillic: Миодраг Џудовић; born 6 September 1979) is a Montenegrin football manager and former player who played as a defender. He is currently the head coach of Moldovan Liga club Sheriff Tiraspol.

After retiring in 2014, he went into coaching. He worked as an assistant of the Montenegro national team, caretaker manager of Budućnost Podgorica in 2018, and as a caretaker manager of the Montenegro national team in 2019. In August 2022. he become manager of Budućnost Podgorica.

== Playing career ==
=== Club career ===
Džudović began his football career in 1999 by joining his first club, Jezero Plav which is a Montenegrin club. They rose to third level in 2001, and a year later and the Second League of FR Yugoslavia. In 2003, Džudović joined another Montenegrin club FK Jedinstvo Bijelo Polje but just making 14 appearances and scoring 2, he left to join Serbian club OFK Beograd in First League of FR Yugoslavia, but made only one appearance and helped the club qualify for the Intertoto Cup, the first time the club qualified for a European Cup in 30 years.

In 2004, Džudović left OFK Beograd to join a Ukrainian side Volyn Lutsk and signing a three-year contract with the team. Džudović made his debut in the Ukrainian Premier League was held 27 March 2004 in a victory for the "Volyn" match against Karpaty Lviv. In Spring 2005 in a match against Dynamo Kyiv, Džudović received a serious injury that gave rise to early termination of the contract. In less than three seasons in the "Volyn" Miodrag spent 44 games in which scoring one goal.

In 2006, Džudović joined a Russian club Spartak Nalchik, signing a contract with a local club. Miodrag debut in the Russian Premier League took place on 18 March 2006 in the first round match against the CSKA Moscow which they lost 1–0. On 26 March 2006, Džudović scored his first goal for the club and scored in the Premier League against Spartak Moscow in a 2–2 draw. He is Spartak's captain as of 2007. In Opening match of league 2010, Džudović made his 100th appearance for the club against Anzhi Makhachkala which had Džudović t-shirt on the back.

In November 2014, Džudović left FC Irtysh Pavlodar after one season with them.

=== International career ===
His good performance in Russia led Montenegro manager Zoran Filipović called up Džudović into the squad. He scored his first goal for national team on his debut against Macedonia on 19 November 2008 and played 90 minutes in the game.

Džudović made headlines when Wayne Rooney kicked him during a Euro 2012 qualifier that resulted in a three-game ban (the entire group stage of Euro 2012) for the Manchester United and England national team striker. At first, it was known that Rooney would miss at least one match in the opening round of the first phase at UEFA Euro 2012. After the game with Montenegro, Rooney sent a personal letter to UEFA in which he apologised and expressed regret for the tackle on Džudović which earned him the red card. Džudović also wrote to UEFA and pleaded for Rooney's ban to be reduced.

He earned a total of 26 caps, scoring one goal and his final international was a September 2013 FIFA World Cup qualification match away against Poland.

== Personal life ==
Džudović is married and has four children His sons are Branko and Vukašin and his daughters are Petra and Tatjana.
