= Predrag Govedarica =

Serbian footballer

Personal information
- Date of birth: 21 October 1984 (age 42)
- Place of birth: Belgrade, SFR Yugoslavia
- Height: 1.89 m (6 ft 2 in)
- Position: Central midfielder

Youth career
- Čukarički

Senior career*
Years	Team	Apps	(Gls)
2002–2007	Čukarički	62	(4)
2003–2004	→ Komgrap (loan)	24	(4)
2007	→ Mladenovac (loan)	13	(0)
2008	Srem	10	(0)
2009–2010	Bežanija	32	(4)
2010–2014	Irtysh Pavlodar	115	(8)
2014	→ Napredak Kruševac (loan)	7	(0)
2015	Bežanija	20	(0)
2016–2017	Akzhayik	55	(3)
2018	Taraz		
2019	Proleter Novi Sad	12	(1)
2019	Grafičar Beograd	1	(0)
2019–2021	Kabel	39	(4)
2021–2022	IMT	5	(0)
- * Club domestic league appearances and goals as of 3 August 2024

Predrag Govedarica (Serbian Cyrillic: Предраг Говедарица; born 21 October 1984) is a Serbian retired football midfielder who last played for IMT.

== Career ==
In August 2014, Govedarica joined Napredak Kruševac on loan. In January 2016, Govedarica signed for FC Akzhayik.
