= Almir Mukhutdinov =

Kazakhstani-Russian footballer

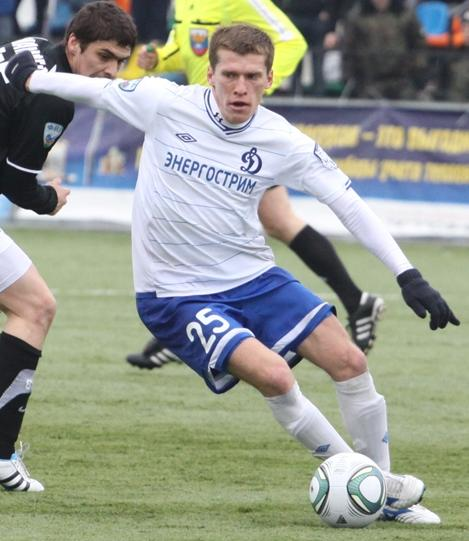
- Mukhutdinov with Dynamo Bryansk in 2012

Personal information
- Full name: Almir Nurullovich Mukhutdinov
- Date of birth: 9 June 1985 (age 41)
- Place of birth: Taraz, Kazakh SSR, Soviet Union
- Height: 1.79 m (5 ft 10 1/2 in)
- Positions: Midfielder; defender

Senior career*
Years	Team	Apps	(Gls)
2003	Spartak-Telekom Shuya	21	(0)
2004–2005	Lokomotiv Kaluga	43	(1)
2006–2007	Okean Nakhodka	45	(2)
2008–2009	Yenisey	37	(2)
2009	Krasnodar	8	(0)
2010	Gazovik Orenburg	20	(3)
2011–2012	Dynamo Bryansk	46	(1)
2012–2013	Volgar	17	(0)
2013–2014	Irtysh	53	(2)
2015	Taraz	24	(2)
2016–2017	Tobol	50	(0)
2018–2020	Zhetysu	44	(1)

International career
2016	Kazakhstan	3	(0)
- * Club domestic league appearances and goals

Almir Nurullovich Mukhutdinov (Russian: Альмир Нуруллович Мухутдинов; born 9 June 1985) is a Kazakhstani former professional football player. He also holds Russian citizenship.

== Career ==
=== Club ===
In February 2013, Mukhutdinov moved to Kazakhstan Premier League side FC Irtysh Pavlodar, leaving them following the conclusion of the 2014 season.

==== Tobol ====
In January 2016, Mukhutdinov signed for FC Tobol, extending his contract with the club the following January.

=== International ===
In October 2015, Mukhutdinov was called up to the Kazakhstan national team for the first time. He made his national team debut on 7 June 2016 in a friendly against China.

== Career statistics ==
=== Club ===
As of match played 22 October 2020

Appearances and goals by club, season and competition
Club	Season	League			National Cup		League Cup		Continental		Other		Total	
Club	Season	Division	Apps	Goals	Apps	Goals	Apps	Goals	Apps	Goals	Apps	Goals	Apps	Goals
Krasnodar	2009	Russian National League	8	0			-		-		-		8	0
Gazovik Orenburg	2010	Russian Professional League	20	3			-		-		-		20	3
Dynamo Bryansk	2011–12	Russian National League	46	1	3	0	-		-		-		49	1
Volgar Astrakhan	2012–13	Russian National League	17	0	1	0	-		-		-		18	0
Irtysh Pavlodar	2013	Kazakhstan Premier League	25	1	3	0	-		-		-		24	0
Irtysh Pavlodar	2014	Kazakhstan Premier League	28	1	1	0	-		-		-		29	1
Irtysh Pavlodar	Total		53	2	4	0	-	-	-	-	-	-	57	2
Taraz	2015	Kazakhstan Premier League	24	2	1	1	-		-		-		25	3
Tobol	2016	Kazakhstan Premier League	23	0	1	0	-		-		-		24	0
Tobol	2017	Kazakhstan Premier League	27	0	1	0	-		-		-		28	0
Tobol	Total		50	0	2	0	-	-	-	-	-	-	52	0
Zhetysu	2018	Kazakhstan Premier League	27	1	0	0	-		-		-		27	1
Zhetysu	2019	Kazakhstan Premier League	15	0	0	0	-		-		-		15	0
Zhetysu	2020	Kazakhstan Premier League	2	0	0	0	-		-		-		2	0
Zhetysu	Total		44	1	0	0	-	-	-	-	-	-	44	1
Career total			262	9	12	1	-	-	-	-	-	-	273	10

=== International ===
Kazakhstan national team
Year	Apps	Goals
2016	3	0
Total	3	0

Statistics accurate as of match played 11 November 2016
