= 2018 FC Irtysh Pavlodar season =

FC Irtysh Pavlodar
2018 season
- Chairman: Roman Skljar
- Manager: Gerard Nus (until 28 April); Dmitry Kuznetsov (Caretaker) (28 April-13 June); Oirat Saduov (13 June-10 July); Dimitar Dimitrov (from 10 July)
- Stadium: Central Stadium
- Premier League: 10th
- Kazakhstan Cup: Semifinal vs Kairat
- Europa League: First Qualifying Round vs Trakai
- Top goalscorer: League: Two Players (5); All: Three Players (5)
Home colours	Away colours

The 2018 FC Irtysh Pavlodar season is the 27th successive season that the club will play in the Kazakhstan Premier League, the highest tier of association football in Kazakhstan. Irtysh will also participate in the Kazakhstan Cup and the Europa League.

== Season events ==
On 21 December 2017, Gerard Nus was appointed as the new manager of Irtysh Pavlodar on a two-year contract. On 28 April 2018 Nus was sacked as the club's manager, with Dmitry Kuznetsov being appointed as caretaker manager. On 13 June, Oirat Saduov was announced as Irtysh Pavlodar's new manager. On 10 July, Irtysh Pavlodar announced the return of Dimitar Dimitrov on a 2 1/2-year contract.

== Squad ==
As of 6 August 2018.

Note: Flags indicate national team as defined under FIFA eligibility rules; some limited exceptions apply. Players may hold more than one non-FIFA nationality.

No.	Pos.	Nation	Player
4	DF	SRB	Miloš Stamenković
5	DF	KAZ	Aleksandr Kislitsyn
7	MF	KAZ	Pavel Shabalin
8	MF	KAZ	Piraliy Aliev
10	MF	BRA	Rodrigo António
11	MF	KAZ	Vladimir Vomenko
12	GK	KAZ	Dzhurakhon Babakhanov
13	GK	KAZ	Nikita Kalmykov
16	DF	ESP	Adri (loan from Albacete)
17	MF	KAZ	Ilya Kalinin
18	DF	KAZ	Valery Lenkov
20	FW	KAZ	Arman Smailov
22	MF	KAZ	Kirill Shestakov

No.	Pos.	Nation	Player
24	DF	KAZ	Dmitry Shmidt
25	DF	KAZ	Ruslan Yesimov
30	GK	KAZ	Serikbol Kapanov
37	DF	KAZ	Rafkat Aslan
40	MF	POR	Carlos Fonseca
47	MF	POR	Hugo Seco
50	FW	NGR	John Chibuike
57	MF	KAZ	Artem Popov
59	MF	ROU	Doru Popadiuc
60	FW	GBS	Abel Camará
80	MF	KAZ	Arman Kenesov
91	MF	KAZ	Madiyar Ramazanov

== Transfers ==
=== In ===
Date	Position	Nationality	Name	From	Fee	Ref.
24 January 2018	DF	(Kazakhstan)	Maksat Amirkhanov	Taraz	Undisclosed	
24 January 2018	DF	(Kazakhstan)	Dmitry Shmidt	Akzhayik	Undisclosed	
24 January 2018	MF	(Kazakhstan)	Rakhimzhan Rozybakiev	Aktobe	Undisclosed	
24 January 2018	DF	(Romania)	Adrian Avrămia	Dynamo Brest	Undisclosed	
24 January 2018	MF	(Romania)	Doru Popadiuc	Voluntari	Undisclosed	
25 January 2018	FW	(Nigeria)	Gbolahan Salami	KuPS	Undisclosed	
26 January 2018	DF	(Spain)	Adri	Albacete	Undisclosed	
26 January 2018	MF	(Kazakhstan)	Kirill Shestakov	Aktobe	Undisclosed	
2 February 2018	MF	(Belarus)	Syarhey Kislyak	Gaziantepspor	Undisclosed	
7 February 2018	DF	(Kazakhstan)	Midat Galbaev	Zimbru Chișinău	Undisclosed	
8 February 2018	DF	(Kazakhstan)	Berik Aitbayev	Aktobe	Undisclosed	
9 March 2018	FW	(Honduras)	Eddie Hernández	Motagua	Undisclosed	
7 July 2018	GK	(Kazakhstan)	Dzhurakhon Babakhanov	Zhetysu	Undisclosed	
	GK	(Kazakhstan)	Almat Bekbaev	Ordabasy	Undisclosed	
22 July 2018	DF	(Kazakhstan)	Rafkat Aslan	Atyrau	Undisclosed	
22 July 2018	MF	(Kazakhstan)	Piraliy Aliev	Atyrau	Undisclosed	
23 July 2018	MF	(Portugal)	Hugo Seco	Feirense	Undisclosed	
24 July 2018	MF	(Brazil)	Rodrigo António		Free	
	FW	(Nigeria)	John Chibuike	Samsunspor	Undisclosed	
	FW	(Guinea-Bissau)	Abel Camará	Cremonese	Undisclosed	

=== Released ===
Date	Position	Nationality	Name	Joined	Date	Ref.
13 June 2018	FW	(Honduras)	Eddie Hernández	Zob Ahan	28 June 2018	
1 July 2018	GK	(Kazakhstan)	Almat Bekbaev	Zhetysu	1 July 2018	
1 July 2018	DF	(Kazakhstan)	Berik Aitbayev	Taraz		
1 July 2018	DF	(Kazakhstan)	Midat Galbaev	Kyzylzhar		
4 July 2018	DF	(Kazakhstan)	Maksat Amirkhanov	Taraz		
20 July 2018	MF	(Kazakhstan)	Rakhimzhan Rozybakiev	Okzhetpes	20 July 2018	
24 July 2018	MF	(Belarus)	Syarhey Kislyak	Dynamo Brest		
26 July 2018	DF	(Romania)	Adrian Avrămia			
9 August 2018	FW	(Nigeria)	Gbolahan Salami	Denizlispor	31 August 2018	
31 December 2018	GK	(Kazakhstan)	Dzhurakhon Babakhanov	Okzhetpes		
31 December 2018	GK	(Kazakhstan)	Serikbol Kapanov			
31 December 2018	DF	(Kazakhstan)	Aleksandr Kislitsyn	Okzhetpes		
31 December 2018	DF	(Kazakhstan)	Valery Lenkov			
31 December 2018	DF	(Serbia)	Miloš Stamenković	Union Saint-Gilloise	16 February 2019	
31 December 2018	MF	(Kazakhstan)	Piraliy Aliev			
31 December 2018	MF	(Kazakhstan)	Ilya Kalinin	Okzhetpes		
31 December 2018	MF	(Kazakhstan)	Madiyar Ramazanov			
31 December 2018	MF	(Kazakhstan)	Kirill Shestakov			
31 December 2018	MF	(Kazakhstan)	Vladimir Vomenko	Atyrau		
31 December 2018	MF	(Brazil)	Rodrigo António			
31 December 2018	MF	(Romania)	Doru Popadiuc	Voluntari		
31 December 2018	FW	(Nigeria)	John Chibuike	Falkenberg		
31 December 2018	FW	(Guinea-Bissau)	Abel Camará	Elazığspor		

=== Trial ===
Date From	Date To	Position	Nationality	Name	Last club
15 January 2018		FW	(Argentina)	Sergio Unrein	Zulia

== Friendlies ==
19 January 2018	Irtysh Pavlodar (Kazakhstan)	1 – 0	(Ukraine) Chornomorets Odesa	United Arab Emirates
(UTC+6)	I.Kalinin 6'	Report

20 January 2018	Irtysh Pavlodar (Kazakhstan)	1 – 1	(Russia) Krasnodar-2	United Arab Emirates
(UTC+6)	Baizhanov 87'	Report	R.Khalnazarov 81'

31 January 2018	Irtysh Pavlodar (Kazakhstan)	0 – 2	(Bulgaria) Ludogorets Razgrad	Belek, Turkey
(UTC+6)		Report	Świerczok 27'; Vura 35'

3 February 2018	Irtysh Pavlodar (Kazakhstan)	2 – 0	(Russia) Volga Nizhny Novgorod	Belek, Turkey
20:30 (UTC+6)	69' (o.g.)	Report

== Competitions ==
=== Premier League ===
==== Results summary ====
Overall								Home						Away					
Pld	W	D	L	GF	GA	GD	Pts	W	D	L	GF	GA	GD	W	D	L	GF	GA	GD
33	10	5	18	28	45	−17	35	6	2	8	19	20	−1	4	3	10	9	25	−16

Last updated: 11 November 2018.
Source: See Results

==== Results by round ====
Round	1	2	3	4	5	6	7	8	9	10	11	12	13	14	15	16	17	18	19	20	21	22	23	24	25	26	27	28	29	30	31	32	33
Ground	H	H	A	H	A	A	H	A	H	A	H	A	H	A	H	H	A	H	A	H	A	A	A	H	H	A	A	H	A	H	A	H	A
Result	W	W	L	L	D	L	L	L	L	W	W	D	W	L	L	L	L	L	D	D	L	L	L	D	L	W	L	W	W	L	W	W	L
Position	2	3	4	6	7	8	9	9	9	9	5	6	5	5	6	7	9	10	9	9	10	12	12	12	12	12	12	12	10	11	10	10	10

Source: See Results
A = Away; H = Home; W = Win; D = Draw; L = Loss

==== Results ====
11 March 2018 1	Irtysh Pavlodar	2 – 1	Atyrau	Pavlodar
15:00 (UTC+6)	Shabalin 5'; Popadiuc 21'; R.Rozybakiev (yellow card) 57'; Salami (yellow card) 83'; Fonseca (yellow card) 90+2'; Kislyak (yellow card) 90+3'	Report	Nane (yellow card) 28'; E.Abdrakhmanov (yellow card) 50'; Khairullin (yellow card) 75'; Kislitsyn 88' (o.g.)	Stadium: Central Stadium; Attendance: 4,500; Referee: Aydin Rakhimbayev

17 March 2018 2	Irtysh Pavlodar	2 – 1	Aktobe	Pavlodar
15:00 (UTC+6)	I.Kalinin 16'; Salami 35' (pen.) (yellow card) 73'	Report	A.Kakimov 6' (pen.); S.Zhumagali (yellow card) 78'; R.Temirkhan (yellow card) 90+2'	Stadium: Central Stadium; Attendance: 3,500; Referee: Artyom Kuchin

31 March 2018 3	Akzhayik	1 – 0	Irtysh Pavlodar	Aksay
15:00 (UTC+6)	I.Antipov 81'	Report	N.Kalmykov (yellow card) 11'	Stadium: Karaşıganak Stadium; Attendance: 1,200; Referee: Aleksei Bobrov

7 April 2018 4	Irtysh Pavlodar	1 – 6	Astana	Pavlodar
15:00 (UTC+6)	I.Kalinin (yellow card) 73'; Hernández 90'	Report	Zaynutdinov 39', 50', 61'; Murtazayev 65'; Pertsukh 70'; Tomasov 88'	Stadium: Central Stadium; Attendance: 4,500; Referee: Daniyar Sakhi

14 April 2018 5	Kaisar	0 – 0	Irtysh Pavlodar	Kyzylorda
16:00 (UTC+6)		Report	Avrămia (yellow card) 45'; Fonseca (yellow card) 64'	Stadium: Gani Muratbayev Stadium; Attendance: 3,000; Referee: Bagdat Abdullaev

22 April 2018 6	Zhetysu	2 – 1	Irtysh Pavlodar	Taldıqorğan
16:00 (UTC+6)	Kozhamberdi (yellow card) 64'; R.Nurmugamet 80'; Hromțov 90'	Report	Fonseca 34' (yellow card) 39'; Popadiuc (yellow card) 39'; D.Shmidt (yellow card) 54'	Stadium: Zhetysu Stadium; Attendance: 2,500; Referee: Bakhyt Kyzylbaev

28 April 2018 7	Irtysh Pavlodar	1 – 2	Kairat	Pavlodar
17:00 (UTC+6)	Popadiuc 12' (yellow card) 22'; R.Yesimov (yellow card) 83'	Report	Elek (yellow card) 5'; Bateau (yellow card) 17'; Arshavin 45'; Anene 63'	Stadium: Central Stadium; Attendance: 3,500; Referee: Askhat Abdanbayev

5 May 2018 8	Ordabasy	1 – 0	Irtysh Pavlodar	Shymkent
18:00 (UTC+6)	Bocharov 54'; Spahija (yellow card) 64'	Report	Avrămia (yellow card) 7'; R.Yesimov (yellow card) 19' (yellow-red card) 61'; V.Vomenko (yellow card) 41'; Kislyak (yellow card) 51'; Fonseca (yellow card) 70'; Bekbaev (yellow card) 90+5'	Stadium: Kazhymukan Munaitpasov Stadium; Attendance: 5,000; Referee: Ruslan Omarov

9 May 2018 9	Irtysh Pavlodar	0 – 1	Tobol	Pavlodar
17:00 (UTC+6)	D.Shmidt (yellow card) 32'; Kislitsyn (yellow card) 67'; Kislyak (yellow card) 79'; Salami (yellow card) 81'	Report	Kassaï (yellow card) 42'; Šikov (yellow card) 64'; Turysbek 90+6'	Stadium: Central Stadium; Attendance: 3,000; Referee: Denis Izmailov

13 May 2018 10	Shakhter Karagandy	0 – 1	Irtysh Pavlodar	Temirtau
16:00 (UTC+6)	Valadzko (yellow card) 10'; Shakhmetov (yellow card) 38'	Report	D.Shmidt (yellow card) 13'; Fonseca (yellow card) 43'; V.Vomenko (yellow card) 81'; R.Rozybakiev (yellow card) 90+1'; I.Pikalkin 90+3'	Stadium: Metallurg Stadium; Attendance: 1,000; Referee: Furkat Atajanov

19 May 2018 11	Irtysh Pavlodar	5 – 0	Kyzylzhar	Pavlodar
16:00 (UTC+6)	Shabalin 17', 28'; Stamenković 44'; V.Vomenko (yellow card) 57'; R.Yesimov (yellow card) 75'; Salami 83'; Popadiuc 90+3'	Report	A.Dzhanuzakov (yellow card) 16'; Grigalashvili (yellow card) 37'; Punoševac (yellow card) 41'; T.Muldinov (yellow card) 66'	Stadium: Central Stadium; Attendance: 2,500; Referee: Bolat Saryev

27 May 2018 12	Aktobe	1 – 1	Irtysh Pavlodar	Aktobe
20:00 (UTC+6)	Pizzelli 35'; Marjanović (yellow card) 36'; A.Shurigin (yellow card) 45'	Report	Salami 24'; Shabalin (yellow card) 34'; V.Vomenko (yellow card) 43'; Adri (yellow card) 55'	Stadium: Central Stadium; Attendance: 9,000; Referee: Aleksandr Aliyev

31 May 2018 13	Irtysh Pavlodar	2 – 0	Akzhayik	Pavlodar
19:00 (UTC+6)	Shestakov (yellow card) 8'; Stamenković 23'; Popadiuc (yellow card) 26'; Salami 39' (pen.)	Report		Stadium: Central Stadium; Attendance: 3,000; Referee: Arman Ismuratov

17 June 2018 14	Astana	3 – 0	Irtysh Pavlodar	Astana
17:00 (UTC+6)	Kleinheisler (yellow card) 21'; Murtazayev 40', 67'; Despotović 60'	Report	Fonseca (yellow card) 55'	Stadium: Astana Arena; Attendance: 5,000; Referee: Artyom Kuchin

23 June 2018 15	Irtysh Pavlodar	0 – 1	Kaisar	Pavlodar
19:00 (UTC+6)	Fonseca (yellow card) 26'	Report	Korobkin (yellow card) 23'; Gorman (yellow card) 27'; Coureur (yellow card) 59'; Kamara (yellow card) 74'; Narzildaev 90'	Stadium: Central Stadium; Attendance: 3,000; Referee: Aleksasndr Gauzer

1 July 2018 16	Irtysh Pavlodar	0 – 2	Zhetysu	Pavlodar
19:00 (UTC+6)	Stamenković (yellow card) 41'; R.Yesimov (yellow card) 68'; Avrămia (yellow card) 85'; V.Vomenko (yellow card) 90+2'	Report	Hovhannisyan 56'; Sadownichy 81'	Stadium: Central Stadium; Attendance: 1,500; Referee: Marat Iskakov

6 July 2018 17	Kairat	4 – 0	Irtysh Pavlodar	Almaty
19:00 (UTC+6)	Isael 24', 58'; Eseola 37'; Arshavin 44'; Bateau (yellow card) 78'; Suyumbayev (yellow card) 79'; Juan Felipe (yellow card) 88'	Report	Kislitsyn (yellow card) 22'; V.Vomenko (yellow card) 50'	Stadium: Central Stadium; Attendance: 4,000; Referee: Bolat Saryev

15 July 2018 18	Irtysh Pavlodar	1 – 2	Ordabasy	Pavlodar
18:30 (UTC+6)	Fonseca (yellow card) 56' (goal) 77'; Adri (yellow card) 78'; Stamenković (yellow card) 79'	Report	Tungyshbayev 43'; Ashirbekov (yellow card) 79'; T.Erlanov (yellow card) 84' (goal) 89'	Stadium: Central Stadium; Attendance: 1,000; Referee: Aydın Rakhimbayev

22 July 2018 19	Tobol	1 – 1	Irtysh Pavlodar	Kostanay
19:00 (UTC+6)	Dmitrenko (yellow card) 61'; S.Zharynbetov 63'	Report	Kislitsyn (yellow card) 33'; Popadiuc (yellow card) 60' (goal) 74'; Adri (yellow card) 65'; Shestakov (yellow card) 83'; A.Popov (yellow card) 87'	Stadium: Central Stadium; Attendance: 4,000; Referee: Timur Kumashev

29 July 2018 20	Irtysh Pavlodar	1 – 1	Shakhter Karagandy	Pavlodar
19:30 (UTC+6)	Rodrigo 56'; Kislitsyn (yellow card) 67'	Report	Kojašević 64'; Shakhmetov (yellow card) 90+2'	Stadium: Central Stadium; Attendance: 3,000; Referee: Bagdat Abdullaev

5 August 2018 21	Kyzylzhar	1 – 0	Irtysh Pavlodar	Petropavl
17:00 (UTC+6)	T.Muldinov 37'; Tsirin (yellow card) 90+4'	Report	Seco (yellow card) 26'; R.Aslan (yellow card) 42'	Stadium: Avangard Stadium; Attendance: 2,500; Referee: Marat Iskakov

12 August 2018 22	Atyrau	2 – 0	Irtysh Pavlodar	Atyrau
20:00 (UTC+6)	Khairullin 38' (pen.); Adeniji 46'; Kubík (yellow card) 90+3'	Report	Shestakov (yellow card) 32'; Seco (yellow card) 90+2'	Stadium: Munaishy Stadium; Attendance: 2,500; Referee: Daniyar Sakhi

19 August 2018 23	Zhetysu	2 – 0	Irtysh Pavlodar	Taldıqorğan
18:00 (UTC+6)	Kuklys 17'; Mukhutdinov (yellow card) 19'; Hromțov 36'	Report	R.Aslan (yellow card) 11' (yellow-red card) 16'; Stamenković (yellow card) 55'; R.Yesimov (yellow card) 70'; I.Kalinin (yellow card) 89'	Stadium: Zhetysu Stadium; Attendance: 2,500; Referee: Aleksandr Aliyev

25 August 2018 24	Irtysh Pavlodar	1 – 1	Shakhter Karagandy	Pavlodar
18:30 (UTC+6)	Shabalin 39'; Camará (yellow card) 45'; Fonseca (yellow card) 56'; D.Shmidt (yellow card) 69'; Kislitsyn (yellow card) 80'; Adri (red card) 90+5'	Report	Shakhmetov 83' (pen.) (yellow card) 90+3'	Stadium: Central Stadium; Attendance: 3,000; Referee: Arman Ismuratov

16 September 2018 25	Irtysh Pavlodar	0 – 1	Kyzylzhar	Pavlodar
18:00 (UTC+6)	Chibuike (yellow card) 20'; R.Aslan (red card) 27'; Rodrigo (yellow card) 45'; R.Yesimov (yellow card) 57'; Fonseca (yellow card) 69'	Report	T.Muldinov 7' (yellow card) 65'; Popkhadze (yellow card) 24'; Delić (yellow card) 78'	Stadium: Central Stadium; Attendance: 3,000; Referee: Furkat Atajanov

22 September 2018 27	Ordabasy	0 – 2	Irtysh Pavlodar	Shymkent
19:00 (UTC+6)	Muženjak (yellow card) 18' (yellow-red card) 57'; Helton (yellow card) 50'; T.Erlanov (yellow card) 76'	Report	Seco 36'; Stamenković (yellow card) 76'; Shabalin 80'; A.Popov (yellow card) 90+5'	Stadium: Kazhymukan Munaitpasov Stadium; Attendance: 1,200; Referee: Artyom Kuchin

26 September 2018 25	Aktobe	2 – 0	Irtysh Pavlodar	Aktobe
20:00 (UTC+6)	Pizzelli 24'; S.Zhumagali (yellow card) 33'; A.Shurigin (yellow card) 49'; Reynaldo 66'; Valiullin (yellow card) 82'	Report	Shabalin (yellow card) 61'	Stadium: Central Stadium; Attendance: 8,000; Referee: Igor Chesnokov

30 September 2018 28	Irtysh Pavlodar	1 – 0	Atyrau	Pavlodar
15:00 (UTC+6)	Obšivač 50' (o.g.); Seco (yellow card) 58'	Report	A.Nurybekov (yellow card) 33'; Ablitarov (yellow card) 83'	Stadium: Central Stadium; Attendance: 1,500; Referee: Aydin Rakhimbayev

6 October 2018 29	Tobol	1 – 2	Irtysh Pavlodar	Kostanay
17:00 (UTC+6)	Žulpa (yellow card) 39'; Nusserbayev 72'; Miroshnichenko (yellow card) 75'; Bystrov (yellow card) 88'	Report	Popadiuc 70'; Stamenković 89' (pen.)	Stadium: Central Stadium; Attendance: 3,000; Referee: Zhandos Abzhan

21 October 2018 30	Irtysh Pavlodar	0 – 1	Kaisar	Pavlodar
16:00 (UTC+6)	V.Vomenko (yellow card) 31'; Fonseca (yellow card) 74'	Report	Marochkin 20'; Kamara (yellow card) 34'; V.Chureyev (yellow card) 55'; Korobkin (yellow card) 62'; Arzhanov (yellow card) 90+2'	Stadium: Central Stadium; Attendance: 2,500; Referee: Bagdat Abdullaev

27 October 2018 31	Kairat	0 – 1	Irtysh Pavlodar	Almaty
15:00 (UTC+6)	Islamkhan (yellow card) 37'; Alip (yellow card) 44'; Arshavin (red card) 86'; Abiken (yellow card) 90+2'	Report	Fonseca 2'; Chibuike (yellow card) 15'; Stamenković (yellow card) 90+2'	Stadium: Central Stadium; Attendance: 2,500; Referee: Bolat Saryev

3 November 2018 32	Irtysh Pavlodar	2 – 0	Akzhayik	Pavlodar
15:00 (UTC+6)	Seco (yellow card) 50'; Shabalin 62'; Camará 80'	Report	B.Shaikhov (yellow card) 30'; Chachua (yellow card) 85'; Basov (yellow card) 88'	Stadium: Central Stadium; Attendance: 2,000; Referee: Timur Kumashev

11 November 2018 33	Astana	4 – 0	Irtysh Pavlodar	Astana
15:00 (UTC+6)	Tomasov 21', 65', 68'; Zaynutdinov (yellow card) 25'; Janga 51'	Report	Fonseca (yellow card) 59'; Camará (yellow card) 90+2'	Stadium: Astana Arena; Attendance: 3,000; Referee: Aydin Rakhimbayev

==== League table ====
Pos	Team	Pld	W	D	L	GF	GA	GD	Pts	Qualification or relegation
8	Shakhter Karagandy	33	8	12	13	29	36	−7	36	
9	Atyrau	33	9	9	15	34	47	−13	36	
10	Irtysh Pavlodar (O)	33	10	5	18	28	45	−17	35	Qualification for the relegation play-offs
11	Kyzylzhar (R)	33	10	5	18	27	48	−21	35	Relegation to the Kazakhstan First Division
12	Akzhayik (R)	33	7	9	17	31	48	−17	30	Relegation to the Kazakhstan First Division

Source: UEFA, Soccerway
Rules for classification: 1) Points; 2) Goal difference; 3) Matches won; 4) Goals scored; 5) Away goals scored; 6) Head-to-head points; 7) Head-to-head matches won; 8) Head-to-head goal difference; 9) Head-to-head goals scored; 10) Head-to-head away goals scored; 11) Draw.
(O) Play-off winners; (R) Relegated

==== Relegation play-off ====
16 November 2018 1st leg	Kyran	0 – 3	Irtysh Pavlodar	Shymkent
15:00 (UTC+6)	D.Kuanyshbay (yellow card) 30'; S.Turekhanov (yellow card) 40'; A.Makhambetov (yellow card) 90+1'	Report	Rodrigo 9'; Shestakov 40'; A.Pazylkhan 49' (o.g.)	Stadium: Lokomotive Stadium; Attendance: 500; Referee: Aleksandr Gauzer

20 November 2018 2nd leg	Irtysh Pavlodar	2 – 1 (5 – 1 agg.)	Kyran	Pavlodar
15:00 (UTC+6)	A.Smailov 66'; Stamenković 82'	Report	S.Abzhal 76'	Stadium: Central Stadium; Attendance: 800; Referee: Georgiy Chekhovskiy

=== Kazakhstan Cup ===
18 April 2018 Last 16	Taraz	0 – 0 (a.e.t.) (4 – 5 p)	Irtysh Pavlodar	Taraz
17:00 (UTC+6)	A.Kenesbek (yellow card) 2'; Govedarica (yellow card) 9'	Report	Shestakov (yellow card) 7'; A.Smailov (yellow card) 19'; M.Ramazanov (yellow card) 105'	Stadium: Central Stadium; Attendance: 3,500; Referee: Arman Ismuratov
	Penalties
	B.Shadmanov (penalty scored); A.Abdenabi (penalty scored); Govedarica (penalty scored); A.Taubay (penalty scored); B.Baitana (penalty scored)		I.Kalinin (penalty scored); Avrămia (penalty scored); Kislitsyn (penalty scored); Popadiuc (penalty scored); R.Yesimov (penalty scored)

23 May 2018 Quarterfinal	Makhtaaral	0 – 3	Irtysh Pavlodar	Atakent
18:00 (UTC+6)		Report	M.Ramazanov (yellow card) 31' (goal) 45+3'; Salami 58' (yellow card) 73'; R.Yesimov (yellow card) 77'; I.Kalinin 90+2'	Stadium: Alpamis Batyr Stadion; Attendance: 1,000; Referee: Denis Tevyashov

14 June 2018 Semifinal 1st leg	Kairat	2 – 0	Irtysh Pavlodar	Almaty
19:00 (UTC+6)	Kuat 7' (yellow card) 19'; Alip (yellow card) 19'; Islamkhan 27'; Sarsenov (yellow card) 83'	Report	D.Shmidt (yellow card) 30'	Stadium: Central Stadium; Attendance: 5,800; Referee: Askhat Abdanbayev

27 June 2018 Semifinal 2nd leg	Irtysh Pavlodar	3 – 1 (3 – 3 (a) agg.)	Kairat	Pavlodar
19:00 (UTC+6)	Fonseca 5', 70' (yellow card) 89'; V.Vomenko 80'	Report	Paragulgov (yellow card) 26'; A.Bakhtiyarov 42'; Suyumbayev (yellow card) 44'	Stadium: Central Stadium; Attendance: 3,000; Referee: Denis Tevyashov

=== UEFA Europa League ===
==== Qualifying rounds ====
12 July 2018 First qualifying round 1st leg	Trakai (Lithuania)	0 – 0	(Kazakhstan) Irtysh Pavlodar	Vilnius, Lithuania
22:00 (UTC+6)		Report	Avrămia (yellow card) 69'; I.Kalinin (yellow card) 75'	Stadium: LFF Stadium; Attendance: 400; Referee: Fabio Verissimo (Portugal)

19 July 2018 First qualifying round 2nd leg	Irtysh Pavlodar (Kazakhstan)	0 – 1 (0 – 1 agg.)	(Lithuania) Trakai	Pavlodar, Kazakhstan
19:00 (UTC+6)	Shestakov (yellow card) 22'; Adri (yellow card) 31'	Report	Čyžas 19'; Osipov (yellow card) 29'	Stadium: Central Stadium; Referee: Barbeno Luca (San Marino)

== Squad statistics ==
As of match played 20 November 2018

=== Appearances and goals ===
No.	Pos	Nat	Player	Total		Premier League		Playoff		Kazakhstan Cup		Europa League	
No.	Pos	Nat	Player	Apps	Goals	Apps	Goals	Apps	Goals	Apps	Goals	Apps	Goals
4	DF	(Serbia) SRB	Miloš Stamenković	31	4	26	3	1	1	2	0	2	0
5	DF	(Kazakhstan) KAZ	Aleksandr Kislitsyn	38	0	30+1	0	1	0	4	0	2	0
7	MF	(Kazakhstan) KAZ	Pavel Shabalin	22	6	14+6	6	1	0	1	0	0	0
10	MF	(Brazil) BRA	Rodrigo António	15	2	14	1	1	1	0	0	0	0
11	MF	(Kazakhstan) KAZ	Vladimir Vomenko	23	1	8+8	0	1	0	2+2	1	0+2	0
12	GK	(Kazakhstan) KAZ	Dzhurakhon Babakhanov	2	0	2	0	0	0	0	0	0	0
13	GK	(Kazakhstan) KAZ	Nikita Kalmykov	35	0	30	0	0	0	3	0	2	0
16	DF	(Spain) ESP	Adri	35	0	28+1	0	1+1	0	2	0	2	0
17	MF	(Kazakhstan) KAZ	Ilya Kalinin	37	2	20+9	1	2	0	2+2	1	2	0
20	FW	(Kazakhstan) KAZ	Arman Smailov	19	1	1+12	0	2	1	1+2	0	0+1	0
22	MF	(Kazakhstan) KAZ	Kirill Shestakov	24	1	9+9	0	1+1	1	2	0	1+1	0
24	DF	(Kazakhstan) KAZ	Dmitry Shmidt	35	0	26+2	0	2	0	3	0	2	0
25	DF	(Kazakhstan) KAZ	Ruslan Yesimov	39	0	31	0	2	0	3+1	0	2	0
30	GK	(Kazakhstan) KAZ	Serikbol Kapanov	2	0	0	0	2	0	0	0	0	0
37	DF	(Kazakhstan) KAZ	Rafkat Aslan	9	0	8	0	1	0	0	0	0	0
40	MF	(Portugal) POR	Carlos Fonseca	31	4	25+1	2	1+1	0	1	2	2	0
44	DF	(Kazakhstan) KAZ	Sansyzbay Zhanturmysov	1	0	0+1	0	0	0	0	0	0	0
47	MF	(Portugal) POR	Hugo Seco	12	1	9+2	1	1	0	0	0	0	0
50	FW	(Nigeria) NGR	John Chibuike	13	0	4+8	0	1	0	0	0	0	0
57	MF	(Kazakhstan) KAZ	Artem Popov	6	0	2+2	0	1+1	0	0	0	0	0
59	MF	(Romania) ROU	Doru Popadiuc	31	5	18+7	5	0+1	0	2+1	0	2	0
60	FW	(Guinea-Bissau) GBS	Abel Camará	13	1	12+1	1	0	0	0	0	0	0
80	MF	(Kazakhstan) KAZ	Arman Kenesov	2	0	1+1	0	0	0	0	0	0	0
91	MF	(Kazakhstan) KAZ	Madiyar Ramazanov	3	1	0+1	0	0	0	1+1	1	0	0
Players away from Irtysh Pavlodar on loan:
Players who left Irtysh Pavlodar during the season:
1	GK	(Kazakhstan) KAZ	Almat Bekbaev	2	0	1	0	0	0	1	0	0	0
6	MF	(Kazakhstan) KAZ	Rakhimzhan Rozybakiev	10	0	4+3	0	0	0	2+1	0	0	0
9	FW	(Honduras) HON	Eddie Hernández	10	1	2+6	1	0	0	2	0	0	0
14	DF	(Kazakhstan) KAZ	Berik Aitbayev	4	0	1+1	0	0	0	2	0	0	0
15	MF	(Belarus) BLR	Syarhey Kislyak	19	0	14+2	0	0	0	2	0	1	0
19	DF	(Kazakhstan) KAZ	Maksat Amirkhanov	3	0	1+1	0	0	0	1	0	0	0
39	FW	(Nigeria) NGR	Gbolahan Salami	21	5	15+2	4	0	0	1+2	1	1	0
65	DF	(Romania) ROU	Adrian Avrămia	13	0	8+1	0	0	0	3	0	1	0
	DF	(Kazakhstan) KAZ	Midat Galbayev	1	0	0	0	0	0	1	0	0	0

=== Goal scorers ===
Place	Position	Nation	Number	Name	Premier League	Playoff	Kazakhstan Cup	Europa League	Total
1	MF	(Kazakhstan)	7	Pavel Shabalin	6	0	0	0	6
2	MF	(Romania)	59	Doru Popadiuc	5	0	0	0	5
2	FW	(Nigeria)	39	Gbolahan Salami	4	0	1	0	5
2	MF	(Portugal)	40	Carlos Fonseca	3	0	2	0	5
5	DF	(Serbia)	4	Miloš Stamenković	3	1	0	0	4
6				Own goal	2	1	0	0	3
7	MF	(Brazil)	10	Rodrigo António	1	1	0	0	2
7	MF	(Kazakhstan)	17	Ilya Kalinin	1	0	1	0	2
9	FW	(Honduras)	9	Eddie Hernández	1	0	0	0	1
9	MF	(Portugal)	47	Hugo Seco	1	0	0	0	1
9	FW	(Guinea-Bissau)	60	Abel Camará	1	0	0	0	1
9	MF	(Kazakhstan)	22	Kirill Shestakov	0	1	0	0	1
9	FW	(Kazakhstan)	20	Arman Smailov	0	1	0	0	1
9	MF	(Kazakhstan)	91	Madiyar Ramazanov	0	0	1	0	1
9	MF	(Kazakhstan)	11	Vladimir Vomenko	0	0	1	0	1
				TOTALS	28	5	6	0	39

=== Disciplinary record ===
Number	Nation	Position	Name	Premier League		Playoff		Kazakhstan Cup		Europa League		Total	
Number	Nation	Position	Name	Yellow card	Red card	Yellow card	Red card	Yellow card	Red card	Yellow card	Red card	Yellow card	Red card
4	(Serbia)	DF	Miloš Stamenković	5	0	0	0	0	0	0	0	5	0
5	(Kazakhstan)	DF	Aleksandr Kislitsyn	5	0	0	0	0	0	0	0	5	0
7	(Kazakhstan)	MF	Pavel Shabalin	2	0	0	0	0	0	0	0	2	0
10	(Brazil)	MF	Rodrigo António	1	0	0	0	0	0	0	0	1	0
11	(Kazakhstan)	MF	Vladimir Vomenko	7	0	0	0	0	0	0	0	7	0
13	(Kazakhstan)	GK	Nikita Kalmykov	1	0	0	0	0	0	0	0	1	0
16	(Spain)	DF	Adri	3	1	0	0	0	0	1	0	4	1
17	(Kazakhstan)	MF	Ilya Kalinin	2	0	0	0	0	0	1	0	3	0
20	(Kazakhstan)	FW	Arman Smailov	0	0	0	0	1	0	0	0	1	0
22	(Kazakhstan)	MF	Kirill Shestakov	3	0	0	0	1	0	1	0	5	0
24	(Kazakhstan)	DF	Dmitry Shmidt	4	0	0	0	1	0	0	0	5	0
25	(Kazakhstan)	DF	Ruslan Yesimov	7	1	0	0	1	0	0	0	8	1
37	(Kazakhstan)	DF	Rafkat Aslan	3	2	0	0	0	0	0	0	3	2
40	(Portugal)	MF	Carlos Fonseca	12	0	0	0	1	0	0	0	13	0
47	(Portugal)	MF	Hugo Seco	4	0	0	0	0	0	0	0	4	0
50	(Nigeria)	FW	John Chibuike	2	0	0	0	0	0	0	0	2	0
57	(Kazakhstan)	MF	Artem Popov	2	0	0	0	0	0	0	0	2	0
59	(Romania)	MF	Doru Popadiuc	4	0	0	0	0	0	0	0	4	0
60	(Guinea-Bissau)	FW	Abel Camará	2	0	0	0	0	0	0	0	2	0
91	(Kazakhstan)	MF	Madiyar Ramazanov	0	0	0	0	2	0	0	0	2	0
Players who left Irtysh Pavlodar during the season:
1	(Kazakhstan)	GK	Almat Bekbaev	1	0	0	0	0	0	0	0	1	0
6	(Kazakhstan)	MF	Rakhimzhan Rozybakiev	2	0	0	0	0	0	0	0	2	0
15	(Belarus)	MF	Syarhey Kislyak	3	0	0	0	0	0	0	0	3	0
39	(Nigeria)	FW	Gbolahan Salami	3	0	0	0	1	0	0	0	4	0
65	(Romania)	DF	Adrian Avrămia	3	0	0	0	0	0	1	0	4	0
			TOTALS	81	4	0	0	8	0	4	0	93	4
