= 2017 FC Irtysh Pavlodar season =

FC Irtysh Pavlodar
2017 season
- Chairman: Roman Skljar
- Manager: Dimitar Dimitrov (until 9 August); Sergei Klimov (caretaker) (from 10–17 August); Vyacheslav Hroznyi (from 17 August)
- Stadium: Central Stadium
- Premier League: 4th
- Kazakhstan Cup: Quarterfinal vs Kairat
- Europa League: Second Qualifying Round vs Red Star Belgrade
- Top goalscorer: League: Rodrigo António; Aslan Darabayev; Carlos Fonseca (5); All: Rodrigo António; Aslan Darabayev (6)
Home colours	Away colours

The 2017 season was the 26th successive season that FC Irtysh Pavlodar played in the Kazakhstan Premier League, the highest tier of association football in Kazakhstan. Irtysh also participated in the Kazakhstan Cup and the Europa League.

== Season events ==
On 9 August, Dimitar Dimitrov resigned as manager of the club, with Sergei Klimov being appointed in a caretaker capacity the next day. Vyacheslav Hroznyi was appointed as the club's new manager on 17 August.

== Squad ==
As of 11 July 2017.

Note: Flags indicate national team as defined under FIFA eligibility rules; some limited exceptions apply. Players may hold more than one non-FIFA nationality.

No.	Pos.	Nation	Player
1	GK	KAZ	David Loria
4	DF	KAZ	Aleksandr Kislitsyn
5	MF	KAZ	Piraliy Aliev
7	MF	KAZ	Aslan Darabayev
8	MF	BRA	Rodrigo António
11	FW	CIV	Béko Fofana (loan from Čukarički)
14	MF	KAZ	Artyom Popov
15	MF	KAZ	Madiyar Ramazanov
16	GK	KAZ	Serikbol Kapanov
17	MF	KAZ	Ilya Kalinin
18	DF	KAZ	Valery Lenkov
20	FW	KAZ	Arman Smailov
21	GK	KAZ	Nikita Kalmykov

No.	Pos.	Nation	Player
25	DF	KAZ	Ruslan Yesimov
28	DF	KAZ	Damir Dautov
30	DF	SRB	Stefan Živković
33	MF	KAZ	Kazbek Geteriev
37	MF	KAZ	Pavel Shabalin
38	DF	SRB	Miloš Stamenković
40	MF	POR	Carlos Fonseca
60	MF	KAZ	Miras Tuliyev
72	DF	SRB	Mario Maslać
84	FW	MDA	Igor Bugaiov
89	GK	KAZ	Anton Tsirin
94	MF	UKR	Vladyslav Ohirya

== Transfers ==
=== Winter ===
In: Note: Flags indicate national team as defined under FIFA eligibility rules; some limited exceptions apply. Players may hold more than one non-FIFA nationality.

No.	Pos.	Nation	Player
2	DF	KAZ	Ilya Vorotnikov (from (Kazakhstan) Taraz)
3	DF	KAZ	Vladislav Chernyshov
4	DF	KAZ	Aleksandr Kislitsyn (from (Kazakhstan) Okzhetpes)
7	MF	KAZ	Aslan Darabayev (from (Kazakhstan) Kairat)
8	MF	BRA	Rodrigo António (from (Israel) Bnei Sakhnin)
9	FW	KAZ	Nurbol Zhumaskaliyev (from (Kazakhstan) Altai Semey)
10	FW	CMR	Serge Bando N'Gambé (from (Kazakhstan) Okzhetpes)
11	FW	CIV	Béko Fofana (loan from (Serbia) Čukarički)
17	MF	KAZ	Ilia Kalinin (from (Kazakhstan) Zhetysu)
19	FW	CIV	Franck Dja Djédjé (from (Qatar) Al-Shahania)
21	GK	KAZ	Nikita Kalmykov (from (Kazakhstan) Kyzylzhar)
30	DF	SRB	Stefan Živković (from (Montenegro) Zeta)
34	DF	UKR	Yevhen Tkachuk (from (Ukraine) Zorya Luhansk)
37	MF	KAZ	Pavel Shabalin (from (Kazakhstan) Atyrau)
50	DF	GEO	Lasha Dvali (loan from (Poland) Śląsk Wrocław)

Out: Note: Flags indicate national team as defined under FIFA eligibility rules; some limited exceptions apply. Players may hold more than one non-FIFA nationality.

No.	Pos.	Nation	Player
2	DF	KAZ	Yeldos Akhmetov (to (Kazakhstan) Kairat)
4	DF	LTU	Georgas Freidgeimas (loan return to (Lithuania) Žalgiris Vilnius)
8	DF	KAZ	Damir Dautov (from (Kazakhstan) Aktobe)
9	FW	SEN	Baye Djiby Fall (to (United States) Cincinnati)
10	FW	CHI	Ignacio Herrera (to (Azerbaijan) Neftchi Baku)
11	MF	GEO	Shota Grigalashvili (to (Uzbekistan) Olmaliq)
13	MF	KAZ	Alibek Ayaganov (to (Kazakhstan) Okzhetpes)
15	DF	BIH	Semir Kerla (to (Bosnia and Herzegovina) Željezničar Sarajevo)
16	MF	CZE	Tomáš Jirsák (to (Czech Republic) Hradec Králové)
17	MF	KAZ	Vitali Li (loan return to (Kazakhstan) Kairat)
19	DF	KAZ	Grigori Sartakov (to (Kazakhstan) Tobol)
20	GK	KAZ	Anton Tsirin (to (Kazakhstan) Kaisar)
45	FW	KAZ	Roman Murtazayev (to (Kazakhstan) Astana)
77	MF	KAZ	Vladimir Vomenko

=== Summer ===
In: Note: Flags indicate national team as defined under FIFA eligibility rules; some limited exceptions apply. Players may hold more than one non-FIFA nationality.

No.	Pos.	Nation	Player
28	DF	KAZ	Damir Dautov (from (Kazakhstan) Aktobe)
38	DF	SRB	Miloš Stamenković (from (Ukraine) Stal Kamianske)
60	MF	KAZ	Miras Tuliyev (from (Kazakhstan) Atyrau)
72	DF	SRB	Mario Maslać (from (Serbia) Vojvodina)
84	FW	MDA	Igor Bugaiov (from (Moldova) Zaria Bălți)
89	GK	KAZ	Anton Tsirin (from (Kazakhstan) Kaisar)
94	MF	UKR	Vladyslav Ohirya (from (Ukraine) Oleksandriya)

Out: Note: Flags indicate national team as defined under FIFA eligibility rules; some limited exceptions apply. Players may hold more than one non-FIFA nationality.

No.	Pos.	Nation	Player
2	DF	KAZ	Ilya Vorotnikov (to (Kazakhstan) Taraz)
3	DF	KAZ	Vladislav Chernyshov
9	MF	KAZ	Nurbol Zhumaskaliyev (to (Kazakhstan) Tobol)
19	FW	CIV	Franck Dja Djédjé (to (Kazakhstan) Kaisar)
34	DF	UKR	Yevhen Tkachuk (to (Ukraine) Stal Kamianske)
50	DF	GEO	Lasha Dvali (loan return to (Poland) Śląsk Wrocław)

=== Released ===
Date	Position	Nationality	Name	Joined	Date	Ref.
5 June 2017	FW	(Cameroon)	Serge Bando N'Gambé			
31 December 2017	GK	(Kazakhstan)	David Loria	Aktobe	27 February 2018	
31 December 2017	GK	(Kazakhstan)	Anton Tsirin	Kyzylzhar		
31 December 2017	DF	(Kazakhstan)	Nursultan Alibayov			
31 December 2017	DF	(Kazakhstan)	Igor Nazarov			
31 December 2017	DF	(Serbia)	Mario Maslać	Pafos	26 January 2018	
31 December 2017	DF	(Serbia)	Stefan Živković	Atyrau	10 January 2018	
31 December 2017	MF	(Brazil)	Rodrigo António			
31 December 2017	MF	(Kazakhstan)	Piraliy Aliev	Atyrau		
31 December 2017	MF	(Kazakhstan)	Yuri Chifin			
31 December 2017	MF	(Kazakhstan)	Aslan Darabayev	Tobol		
31 December 2017	MF	(Kazakhstan)	Damir Dautov	Ordabasy		
31 December 2017	MF	(Kazakhstan)	Kazbek Geteriev			
31 December 2017	MF	(Kazakhstan)	Dauren Orymbay			
31 December 2017	MF	(Kazakhstan)	Miras Tuliyev			
31 December 2017	MF	(Kazakhstan)	Bagdat Urazaliev			
31 December 2017	MF	(Ukraine)	Vladyslav Ohirya	Desna Chernihiv		
31 December 2017	FW	(Kazakhstan)	Dmitri Rybalko			
31 December 2017	FW	(Kazakhstan)	Muratkhan Zeynollin			
31 December 2017	FW	(Moldova)	Igor Bugaiov	Milsami Orhei		

== Competitions ==
=== Kazakhstan Premier League ===
==== Results summary ====
Overall								Home						Away					
Pld	W	D	L	GF	GA	GD	Pts	W	D	L	GF	GA	GD	W	D	L	GF	GA	GD
33	12	12	9	34	32	+2	48	4	7	6	19	20	−1	8	5	3	15	12	+3

Last updated: 5 November 2017.
Source: See Results

==== Results by round ====
Round	1	2	3	4	5	6	7	8	9	10	11	12	13	14	15	16	17	18	19	20	21	22	23	24	25	26	27	28	29	30	31	32	33
Ground	H	H	A	H	A	A	H	A	H	A	H	A	A	H	A	A	H	A	H	H	H	A	A	H	A	H	H	A	H	A	H	A	H
Result	W	D	W	L	D	W	W	D	D	D	L	W	L	D	W	W	D	L	W	L	L	W	D	D	D	L	L	W	D	L	D	W	W
Position	3	4	3	4	3	3	1	2	2	3	4	3	5	5	5	4	4	4	4	4	5	4	4	4	4	5	5	4	4	4	5	4	4

Source: See results
A = Away; H = Home; W = Win; D = Draw; L = Loss

==== Results ====
8 March 2017 1	Irtysh Pavlodar	2 – 1	Akzhayik	Pavlodar
15:00 (UTC+6)	Darabayev 46'; Živković 88' (pen.)	Summary	Govedarica (yellow card) 31'; Dudchenko (yellow card) 50'; Coronel 83'; K.Zarechny (yellow card) 87'; Nikolić (yellow card) 87'	Stadium: Central Stadium; Attendance: 4,500; Referee: Timur Kumashev

12 March 2017 2	Irtysh Pavlodar	1 – 1	Astana	Pavlodar
15:00 (UTC+6)	Tkachuk 30'; Darabayev (yellow card) 40'	Summary	Muzhikov 14'; Postnikov (yellow card) 84'	Stadium: Central Stadium; Attendance: 3,500; Referee: Denis Izmailov

18 March 2017 3	Atyrau	0 – 1	Irtysh Pavlodar	Atyrau
16:00 (UTC+6)	Z.Korobov (yellow card) 20'; Chichulin (yellow card) 50'	Summary	Tkachuk (yellow card) 59'; R.Yesimov (yellow card) 64'; António 88'	Stadium: Munaishy Stadium; Attendance: 3,000; Referee: Marat Iskakov

31 March 2017 4	Irtysh Pavlodar	1 – 3	Aktobe	Pavlodar
17:00 (UTC+6)	Fofana 55'; Fonseca (yellow card) 82'; Dja Djédjé (yellow card) 90+4'	Summary	Juninho 63'; A.Shurigin (yellow card) 65'; Shestakov 72'; Zyankovich 77'	Stadium: Central Stadium; Attendance: 2,500; Referee: Bolat Karlibayev

4 April 2017 18	Kairat	1 – 1	Irtysh Pavlodar	Almaty
19:30 (UTC+6)	Marković 48'	Summary	Vorotnikov 80'	Stadium: Central Stadium; Attendance: 5,000; Referee: Anatolyi Vishnichenko

8 April 2017 5	Okzhetpes	0 – 2	Irtysh Pavlodar	Shchuchinsk
17:00 (UTC+6)	Fedin (yellow card) 5'; Genkov (yellow card) 54'	Summary	Živković (yellow card) 27'; Fofana 57'; Kislitsyn 65'	Stadium: Zhaksy Stadium; Attendance: 150; Referee: Askhat Abdanbayev

12 April 2017 6	Irtysh Pavlodar	5 – 2	Taraz	Pavlodar
19:00 (UTC+6)	Darabayev (yellow card) 8' (goal) 53', 64'; Fonseca 20'; António (yellow card) 25'; Aliev 76'; Dja Djédjé 82'	Summary	Mukhametshin 17'; Feshchuk 66'	Stadium: Central Stadium; Attendance: 2,800; Referee: Denis Tevyashov

16 April 2017 7	Kaisar	1 – 1	Irtysh Pavlodar	Kyzylorda
16:00 (UTC+6)	D.Yevstigneyev (yellow card) 25'; Korobkin (yellow card) 45+1'; Kamara (yellow card) 77'; Ntibazonkiza 86'	Summary	Aliev (yellow card) 14'; António (yellow card) 41' (goal) 83'	Stadium: Gani Muratbayev Stadium; Attendance: 5,000; Referee: Aleksei Bobrov

23 April 2017 8	Irtysh Pavlodar	3 – 3	Kairat	Pavlodar
14:00 (UTC+6)	Živković 13' (pen.); Darabayev 28'; Dja Djédjé 40' (yellow card) 48'; Dvali (yellow card) 59'; N'Gambé (yellow card) 87'; Loria (yellow card) 88'	Summary	Gohou 5'; Arzo (yellow card) 54' (yellow-red card) 58'; Zhukov (yellow card) 55'; Iličević 61'; Marković (yellow card) 81'; Kuat (yellow card) 87'; Islamkhan 88'	Stadium: Central Stadium; Attendance: 6,000; Referee: Artyom Kuchin

29 April 2017 9	Tobol	0 – 0	Irtysh Pavlodar	Kostanay
16:00 (UTC+6)	Sartakov (yellow card) 43'	Report	Darabayev (yellow card) 74'; I.Kalinin (yellow card) 83'	Stadium: Stadion Zatobolets; Attendance: 2,000; Referee: Bolat Karlibayev

2 May 2017 10	Irtysh Pavlodar	0 – 1	Ordabasy	Pavlodar
19:00 (UTC+6)	Živković (yellow card) 18'; Fonseca (yellow card) 45'; Vorotnikov (yellow card) 74'; Shabalin (yellow card) 89'	Report	Gogua (yellow card) 28'; Fontanello 75'; T.Erlanov (yellow card) 75'	Stadium: Central Stadium; Attendance: 4,500; Referee: Ashkat Abdanbayev

6 May 2017 11	Shakhter Karagandy	0 – 1	Irtysh Pavlodar	Karaganda
16:00 (UTC+6)		Report	Aliev 4'; Darabayev (yellow card) 75'	Stadium: Shakhter Stadium; Attendance: 1,000; Referee: Denis Izmailov

14 May 2017 12	Astana	2 – 0	Irtysh Pavlodar	Astana
18:00 (UTC+6)	Murtazayev 13'; Shomko (yellow card) 57'; D.Zhalmukan 79'	Report	I.Kalinin (yellow card) 27'; Fofana (yellow card) 32'; Aliev (yellow card) 62'; Fonseca (yellow card) 64'	Stadium: Astana Arena; Attendance: 8,000; Referee: Aleksandr Gauzer

20 May 2017 13	Irtysh Pavlodar	1 – 1	Atyrau	Pavlodar
19:00 (UTC+6)	Kislitsyn 27'; Vorotnikov (yellow card) 72'	Report	Rodić (yellow card) 44'; Obšivač 68'; V.Li (yellow card) 69'; A.Saparov (yellow card) 80'; A.Pasechenko (yellow card) 90'	Stadium: Central Stadium; Attendance: 3,500; Referee: Aleksandr Aliyev

27 May 2017 14	Aktobe	1 – 2	Irtysh Pavlodar	Aktobe
19:00 (UTC+6)	B.Baitana (yellow card) 10'; Mamute (yellow card) 62'; Zyankovich 73'	Report	Fofana (yellow card) 21'; Tkachuk 56'; António (yellow card) 67'; Fonseca 87'	Stadium: Central Stadium; Attendance: 8,000; Referee: Timur Kumashev

31 May 2017 20	Ordabasy	0 – 1	Irtysh Pavlodar	Shymkent
18:00 (UTC+6)		Report	Darabayev 48' (yellow card) 53'; Shabalin (yellow card) 87'; Aliev (yellow card) 90'	Stadium: Kazhymukan Munaitpasov Stadium; Attendance: 3,500

3 June 2017 15	Irtysh Pavlodar	0 – 0	Okzhetpes	Pavlodar
19:00 (UTC+6)	Živković (yellow card) 87'	Report	O.Nedashkovsky (yellow card) 62'; Stamenković (yellow card) 90+4'	Stadium: Central Stadium; Attendance: 3,200; Referee: Georgiy Chekhovskiy

18 June 2017 16	Taraz	2 – 0	Irtysh Pavlodar	Taraz
19:00 (UTC+6)	Ba.Zaynutdinov 13'; Y.Seidakhmet 24'	Report	Darabayev (yellow card) 45+1'	Stadium: Central Stadium; Attendance: 3,200; Referee: Daniyar Sakhi

24 June 2017 17	Irtysh Pavlodar	1 – 0	Kaisar	Pavlodar
19:00 (UTC+6)	Živković (yellow card) 16' (goal) 57' (pen.)	Report	D.Yevstigneyev (yellow card) 19'; Korobkin (yellow card) 23' (yellow-red card) 60'; Baizhanov (yellow card) 25'; I.Amirseitov (yellow card) 51'; Arzhanov (yellow card) 54'	Stadium: Central Stadium; Attendance: 2,800; Referee: Denis Tevyashov

10 July 2017 19	Irtysh Pavlodar	0 – 1	Tobol	Pavlodar
20:00 (UTC+6)	I.Kalinin (yellow card) 4'; Geteriev (yellow card) 14'; Kislitsyn (yellow card) 39'; Shabalin (yellow card) 66'	Report	Sartakov (yellow card) 70'; Fonseca 82' (o.g.)	Stadium: Central Stadium; Attendance: 4,000; Referee: Denis Izmailov

23 July 2017 21	Irtysh Pavlodar	1 – 2	Shakhter Karagandy	Pavlodar
19:00 (UTC+6)	Fonseca 20' (yellow card) 73'; Živković (yellow card) 45'	Report	Stanojević (yellow card) 39'; M.Gabyshev (yellow card) 45'; Stojanović 65'; Khizhnichenko 82' (yellow card) 83'	Stadium: Central Stadium; Attendance: 2,500; Referee: Aleksandr Gauzer

30 July 2017 22	Akzhayik	0 – 1	Irtysh Pavlodar	Oral
19:00 (UTC+6)	Govedarica (yellow card) 38'; Y.Pertsukh (yellow card) 87'	Report	Bugaiov (yellow card) 11' (goal) 18'	Stadium: Petr Atoyan Stadium; Attendance: 1,200; Referee: Daniyar Sakhi

13 August 2017 23	Atyrau	0 – 0	Irtysh Pavlodar	Atyrau
19:00 (UTC+6)	E.Abdrakhmanov (yellow card) 90+1'	Report	Darabayev (yellow card) 61'; Kislitsyn (yellow card) 67'	Stadium: Munaishy Stadium; Attendance: 2,500; Referee: Artyom Kuchin

20 August 2017 24	Irtysh Pavlodar	0 – 0	Kaisar	Pavlodar
19:30 (UTC+6)	Aliev (yellow card) 21'; Stamenković (yellow card) 57' (yellow-red card) 71'	Report	I.Amirseitov (yellow card) 25'; M.Bayzhanov (yellow card) 31'; Coureur (yellow card) 31'; Korobkin (yellow card) 71'; Graf (yellow card) 90+1'	Stadium: Central Stadium; Attendance: 3,500; Referee: Furkat Atajanov

26 August 2017 25	Taraz	1 – 1	Irtysh Pavlodar	Taraz
19:00 (UTC+6)	Feshchuk 7'; Diarra (yellow card) 57'; Mijušković (yellow card) 68'; Vorotnikov (yellow card) 85'	Report	António 48'; R.Yesimov (yellow card) 61'; Bugaiov (yellow card) 67'	Stadium: Central Stadium; Attendance: 3,500; Referee: Marat Iskakov

10 September 2017 26	Irtysh Pavlodar	1 – 2	Tobol	Pavlodar
15:00 (UTC+6)	Stamenković (yellow card) 66'; Kvekveskiri 73' (o.g.)	Report	Mukhutdinov (yellow card) 27'; Shchotkin 41'; Šikov (yellow card) 54'; Kassaï 82'; D.Miroshnichenko (yellow card) 86'	Stadium: Central Stadium; Attendance: 2,500; Referee: Timur Kumashev

16 September 2017 27	Irtysh Pavlodar	0 – 1	Akzhayik	Pavlodar
17:00 (UTC+6)	Darabayev (yellow card) 74'; Aliev (red card) 90'	Report	K.Zarechny (yellow card) 33'; Nikolić (yellow card) 40'; Y.Pertsukh 72'	Stadium: Central Stadium; Attendance: 2,500; Referee: Bagdat Abdullaev

24 September 2017 28	Ordabasy	1 – 2	Irtysh Pavlodar	Shymkent
19:00 (UTC+6)	Simčević (yellow card) 8' (yellow-red card) 73'; Nusserbayev (yellow card) 27'; Kovalchuk (yellow card) 40'; M.Tolebek (yellow card) 64'; Vujaklija 85'	Report	Fofana (yellow card) 27' (goal) 32', 49'; Stamenković (yellow card) 45+2'; António (yellow card) 54'; I.Kalinin (yellow card) 78'; Loria (yellow card) 90+1'	Stadium: Kazhymukan Munaitpasov Stadium; Attendance: 3,000; Referee: Artyom Kuchin

30 September 2017 29	Irtysh Pavlodar	1 – 1	Kairat	Pavlodar
15:00 (UTC+6)	Fonseca 23' (yellow card) 35'; R.Yesimov (yellow card) 39'; Ohirya (yellow card) 73'	Report	Gohou 28'; Arshavin (yellow card) 29'; Arzo (yellow card) 29'; Akhmetov (yellow card) 45+1' (red card) 45+1'; Anene (yellow card) 90+2'	Stadium: Central Stadium; Attendance: 3,000; Referee: Denis Izmailov

15 October 2017 30	Astana	2 – 1	Irtysh Pavlodar	Astana
15:00 (UTC+6)	Postnikov (yellow card) 45+1'; Murtazayev 52'; Twumasi 64' (pen.); Beisebekov (yellow card) 90+2'	Report	António 41'; Stamenković (yellow card) 59'; Aliev (yellow card) 72'	Stadium: Astana Arena; Attendance: 4,000; Referee: Aleksei Bobrov

21 October 2017 31	Irtysh Pavlodar	1 – 1	Aktobe	Pavlodar
15:00 (UTC+6)	Aliev (yellow card) 32'; Ohirya (yellow card) 72'; Kislitsyn (yellow card) 75'; Faug-Porret 90+7' (o.g.)	Report	Šimkovič (yellow card) 30' (goal) 90+3'; Faug-Porret (yellow card) 75'	Stadium: Central Stadium; Attendance: 2,500; Referee: Marat Iskakov

28 October 2017 32	Okzhetpes	1 – 2	Irtysh Pavlodar	Kokshetau
15:00 (UTC+6)	Dosmagambetov 27'; Yurin (yellow card) 67'	Report	António 5'; Stamenković 12'	Stadium: Okzhetpes Stadium; Attendance: 2,000; Referee: Georgiy Chekhovskiy

5 November 2017 33	Irtysh Pavlodar	1 – 0	Shakhter Karagandy	Pavlodar
15:00 (UTC+6)	Ohirya (yellow card) 60'; Fonseca 90+3' (yellow card) 90+3'	Report	Najaryan (yellow card) 77'	Stadium: Central Stadium; Attendance: 4,000; Referee: Aydin Rakhimbayev

==== League table ====
Pos	Team	Pld	W	D	L	GF	GA	GD	Pts	Qualification or relegation
2	Kairat	33	23	9	1	75	28	+47	78	Qualification for the Europa League first qualifying round (Note: Kairat qualified for the Europa League first qualifying round by winning the 2017 Kazakhstan Cup.)
3	Ordabasy	33	18	4	11	44	37	+7	58	
4	Irtysh Pavlodar	33	12	12	9	35	32	+3	48	Qualification for the Europa League first qualifying round (Note: Ordabasy would have qualified too, but they failed to obtain a licence, so Tobol took their place.)
5	Tobol	33	12	11	10	36	26	+10	47	Qualification for the Europa League first qualifying round
6	Kaisar	33	11	9	13	30	36	−6	42	

Source: UEFA, Soccerway
Rules for classification: 1) Points; 2) Head-to-head points; 3) Head-to-head matches won; 4) Head-to-head goal difference; 5) Head-to-head goals scored; 6) Head-to-head away goals scored; 7) Goal difference; 8) Matches won; 9) Goals scored; 10) Away goals scored; 11) Draw.

=== Kazakhstan Cup ===
19 April 2017 Last 16	Irtysh Pavlodar	3 – 2 (a.e.t.)	Kaisar	Pavlodar
19:00 (UTC+6)	Fofana 31'; Chernyshov (yellow card) 65'; Dja Djédjé 82'; António 110'; Kislitsyn (yellow card) 119'	Summary	Kukeyev (yellow card) 30' (red card) 120+3'; R.Sakhalbayev (yellow card) 63' (yellow-red card) 73'; Narzildaev 66'; E.Goryachi (yellow card) 73'; E.Altynbekov 79'; A.Zhakhayev (yellow card) 82'; E.Seitkanov (yellow card) 87'; Muldarov (yellow card) 115'; Grigorenko (yellow card) 115'; O.Altaev (yellow card) 116'	Stadium: Central Stadium; Attendance: 6,000; Referee: Aleksandr Aliyev

10 May 2017 Quarterfinal	Kairat	2 – 0	Irtysh Pavlodar	Almaty
20:00 (UTC+6)	Gohou 8'; Iličević 44'; Kuat (red card) 89'; Suyumbayev (yellow card) 89'	Report	Dja Djédjé (yellow card) 41'; Fonseca (red card) 89'	Stadium: Central Stadium; Attendance: 6,500

=== UEFA Europa League ===
==== Qualifying rounds ====
29 June 2017 First qualifying round 1st leg	Irtysh Pavlodar (Kazakhstan)	1 – 0	(Bulgaria) Dunav Ruse	Pavlodar, Kazakhstan
20:00 (UTC+6)	Bugaiov 5'; Fofana (yellow card) 19' Darabayev (yellow card) 61'	Report		Stadium: Pavlodar Central Stadium; Attendance: 8,000; Referee: Arnold Hunter (Northern Ireland)

6 July 2017 First qualifying round 2nd leg	Dunav Ruse (Bulgaria)	0 – 2 (0 – 3 agg.)	(Kazakhstan) Irtysh Pavlodar	Ruse, Bulgaria
21:00 (UTC+6)	Karagaren (yellow card) 50'	Report	Maslać 6'; Darabayev 88'	Stadium: Gradski Stadium; Attendance: 5,100; Referee: Jovan Kaludjerović (Montenegro)

13 July 2017 Second qualifying round 1st leg	Irtysh Pavlodar (Kazakhstan)	1 – 1	(Serbia) Red Star Belgrade	Pavlodar, Kazakhstan
20:00 (UTC+6)	Stamenković (yellow card) 52'; Živković 90+3' (pen.)	Report	Srnić (yellow card) 16'; Stojković (yellow card) 36'; Boakye 51' (pen.); Donald (yellow card) 73'	Stadium: Pavlodar Central Stadium; Attendance: 8,500; Referee: Marius Avram (Romania)

21 July 2017 Second qualifying round 2nd leg	Red Star Belgrade (Serbia)	2 – 0 (3 – 1 agg.)	(Kazakhstan) Irtysh Pavlodar	Belgrade, Serbia
00:30 (UTC+6)	Stojković (yellow card) 7'; Donald 10'; Srnić 77' (yellow card) 77'; Le Tallec (yellow card) 90+5'	Report	Živković (yellow card) 60'	Stadium: Red Star Stadium; Referee: Fedayi San (Switzerland)

== Squad statistics ==
As of match played 5 November 2017

=== Appearances and goals ===
No.	Pos	Nat	Player	Total		Premier League		Kazakhstan Cup		Europa League	
No.	Pos	Nat	Player	Apps	Goals	Apps	Goals	Apps	Goals	Apps	Goals
1	GK	(Kazakhstan) KAZ	David Loria	34	0	30	0	0	0	4	0
4	DF	(Kazakhstan) KAZ	Aleksandr Kislitsyn	32	2	27	2	1	0	4	0
5	DF	(Kazakhstan) KAZ	Piraliy Aliev	21	2	11+10	2	0	0	0	0
7	MF	(Kazakhstan) KAZ	Aslan Darabayev	36	6	29+2	5	1	0	2+2	1
8	MF	(Brazil) BRA	Rodrigo António	38	6	32	5	1+1	1	4	0
11	FW	(Ivory Coast) CIV	Béko Fofana	35	5	23+6	4	1+1	1	2+2	0
14	MF	(Kazakhstan) KAZ	Artyom Popov	8	0	0+5	0	2	0	0+1	0
17	MF	(Kazakhstan) KAZ	Ilya Kalinin	21	0	9+7	0	1+1	0	2+1	0
20	FW	(Kazakhstan) KAZ	Arman Smailov	1	0	0+1	0	0	0	0	0
21	GK	(Kazakhstan) KAZ	Nikita Kalmykov	5	0	3	0	2	0	0	0
25	DF	(Kazakhstan) KAZ	Ruslan Yesimov	23	0	16+4	0	2	0	0+1	0
28	DF	(Kazakhstan) KAZ	Damir Dautov	13	0	7+2	0	0	0	4	0
30	DF	(Serbia) SRB	Stefan Živković	34	4	29	3	1	0	4	1
33	MF	(Kazakhstan) KAZ	Kazbek Geteriev	19	0	13+1	0	0+1	0	3+1	0
37	MF	(Kazakhstan) KAZ	Pavel Shabalin	22	0	7+13	0	1	0	0+1	0
38	DF	(Serbia) SRB	Miloš Stamenković	16	1	13	1	0	0	2+1	0
40	FW	(Portugal) POR	Carlos Fonseca	38	5	31+1	5	2	0	4	0
72	DF	(Serbia) SRB	Mario Maslać	17	1	11+2	0	0	0	4	1
84	FW	(Moldova) MDA	Igor Bugaiov	19	2	11+4	1	0	0	4	1
94	MF	(Ukraine) UKR	Vladyslav Ohirya	10	0	6+4	0	0	0	0	0
Players away from Irtysh Pavlodar on loan:
Players who left Irtysh Pavlodar during the season:
2	DF	(Kazakhstan) KAZ	Ilya Vorotnikov	15	1	14	1	1	0	0	0
3	DF	(Kazakhstan) KAZ	Vladislav Chernyshov	1	0	0	0	1	0	0	0
9	MF	(Kazakhstan) KAZ	Nurbol Zhumaskaliyev	10	0	0+7	0	1+1	0	0+1	0
10	FW	(Cameroon) CMR	Serge Bando N'Gambé	14	0	5+9	0	0	0	0	0
19	FW	(Ivory Coast) CIV	Franck Dja Djédjé	19	3	7+8	2	1+1	1	1+1	0
34	DF	(Ukraine) UKR	Yevhen Tkachuk	14	2	12	2	2	0	0	0
50	DF	(Georgia (country)) GEO	Lasha Dvali	17	0	16	0	1	0	0	0

=== Goal scorers ===
Place	Position	Nation	Number	Name	Premier League	Kazakhstan Cup	Champions League	Total
1	MF	(Brazil)	8	Rodrigo António	5	1	0	6
1	MF	(Kazakhstan)	7	Aslan Darabayev	5	0	1	6
3	FW	(Portugal)	40	Carlos Fonseca	5	0	0	5
3	FW	(Ivory Coast)	11	Béko Fofana	4	1	0	5
5	DF	(Serbia)	30	Stefan Živković	3	0	1	4
6	FW	(Ivory Coast)	19	Franck Dja Djédjé	2	1	0	3
7	DF	(Kazakhstan)	5	Piraliy Aliev	2	0	0	2
7	DF	(Kazakhstan)	4	Aleksandr Kislitsyn	2	0	0	2
7	DF	(Ukraine)	34	Yevhen Tkachuk	2	0	0	2
7	FW	(Moldova)	84	Igor Bugaiov	1	0	1	2
11	DF	(Kazakhstan)	2	Ilya Vorotnikov	1	0	0	1
11	DF	(Serbia)	38	Miloš Stamenković	1	0	0	1
11	DF	(Serbia)	72	Mario Maslać	0	0	1	1
11				Own goal	1	0	0	1
				TOTALS	34	3	4	41

=== Disciplinary record ===
Number	Nation	Position	Name	Premier League		Kazakhstan Cup		Champions League		Total	
Number	Nation	Position	Name	Yellow card	Red card	Yellow card	Red card	Yellow card	Red card	Yellow card	Red card
1	(Kazakhstan)	GK	David Loria	2	0	0	0	0	0	2	0
2	(Kazakhstan)	DF	Ilya Vorotnikov	2	0	0	0	0	0	2	0
3	(Kazakhstan)	DF	Vladislav Chernyshov	0	0	1	0	0	0	1	0
4	(Kazakhstan)	DF	Aleksandr Kislitsyn	3	0	1	0	0	0	4	0
5	(Kazakhstan)	DF	Piraliy Aliev	6	1	0	0	0	0	6	1
7	(Kazakhstan)	MF	Aslan Darabayev	8	0	0	0	1	0	9	0
8	(Brazil)	MF	Rodrigo António	4	0	0	0	0	0	4	0
10	(Cameroon)	FW	Serge Bando N'Gambé	1	0	0	0	0	0	1	0
11	(Ivory Coast)	FW	Béko Fofana	3	0	0	0	1	0	4	0
17	(Kazakhstan)	MF	Ilya Kalinin	4	0	0	0	0	0	4	0
19	(Ivory Coast)	FW	Franck Dja Djédjé	2	0	1	0	0	0	3	0
25	(Kazakhstan)	DF	Ruslan Yesimov	3	0	0	0	0	0	3	0
30	(Serbia)	DF	Stefan Živković	5	0	0	0	1	0	6	0
33	(Kazakhstan)	MF	Kazbek Geteriev	1	0	0	0	0	0	1	0
34	(Ukraine)	DF	Yevhen Tkachuk	1	0	0	0	0	0	1	0
37	(Kazakhstan)	DF	Pavel Shabalin	3	0	0	0	0	0	3	0
38	(Serbia)	DF	Miloš Stamenković	5	1	0	0	1	0	6	1
40	(Portugal)	FW	Carlos Fonseca	6	0	0	1	0	0	6	1
50	(Georgia (country))	DF	Lasha Dvali	1	0	0	0	0	0	1	0
84	(Moldova)	FW	Igor Bugaiov	2	0	0	0	0	0	2	0
94	(Ukraine)	MF	Vladyslav Ohirya	3	0	0	0	0	0	3	0
			TOTALS	65	2	3	1	4	0	73	3
