= 2019 FC Irtysh Pavlodar season =

FC Irtysh Pavlodar
2019 season
- Chairman: Roman Skljar
- Manager: Dimitar Dimitrov (until 2 May); Sergey Klimov (Caretaker) (2 May-7 June); Milan Milanović (from 7 June)
- Stadium: Central Stadium
- Premier League: 8th
- Kazakhstan Cup: Quarterfinal vs Kaisar
- Top goalscorer: League: Jérémy Manzorro (6); All: Jérémy Manzorro (6)
Home colours	Away colours

The 2019 FC Irtysh Pavlodar season was the 28th successive season that the club will play in the Kazakhstan Premier League, the highest tier of association football in Kazakhstan. After narrowly avoiding relegation the previous season, Irtysh also participate in the Kazakhstan Cup, reaching the Quarterfinal's before defeat to Kaisar, and finishing 8th in the Premier League.

== Season events ==
At the end of April, rumors that manager Dimitar Dimitrov had left his role where downplayed by the club, however Dimitrov and his coaching staff subsequently went AWOL for Irtysh Pavlodar's match against Zhetysu on 1 May. The following day, 2 May, Dimitrov and his staff where summoned by clubs leadership to explain their absence, an explanation that wasn't demean valid by the club but he was suspended over the matter, with Sergey Klimov being appointed as caretaker manager.

On 7 June, Milan Milanović was announced as the club's new manager.

On 21 November, Irtysh signed Miloš Stamenković, Carlos Fonseca, Arman Kenesov, Serikbol Kapanov, Alexander Zarutsky and Dmitry Schmidt to new contracts.

On 29 November, Irtysh announced that Arman Nusip and Rafkat Aslan had signed new contracts with the club.

== Squad ==
As of match played 10 November 2019

No.	Name	Nationality	Position	Date of birth (age)	Signed from	Signed in	Contract ends	Apps.	Goals
Goalkeepers
1	Aleksandr Zarutskiy	(Kazakhstan)	GK	26 August 1993 (aged 26)	Atyrau	2019		7	0
22	Andrey Pasechenko	(Kazakhstan)	GK	9 August 1987 (aged 32)	loan from Tobol	2019	2019	9	0
98	Ilya Sotnik	(Kazakhstan)	GK	18 May 1998 (aged 21)	Ekibastuz	2019		0	0
Defenders
2	Rafkat Aslan	(Kazakhstan)	DF	2 February 1994 (aged 25)	Atyrau	2018	2020	29	1
5	Uroš Vitas	(Serbia)	DF	6 July 1992 (aged 27)	Mechelen	2019		21	2
15	Dmitry Shmidt	(Kazakhstan)	DF	17 November 1993 (aged 25)	Akzhayik	2018	2019	69	0
23	Sagadat Tursynbay	(Kazakhstan)	DF	26 March 1999 (aged 20)	Ordabasy	2019		13	0
25	Ruslan Yesimov	(Kazakhstan)	DF	28 April 1990 (aged 29)	Caspiy	2015		119	2
32	Miloš Stamenković	(Serbia)	DF	1 June 1990 (aged 29)	Union Saint-Gilloise	2019		63	6
77	Aleksandr Sokolenko	(Kazakhstan)	DF	23 November 1996 (aged 22)	loan from Kairat	2019	2019	6	0
Midfielders
7	Ruslan Mingazow	(Turkmenistan)	MF	23 November 1991 (aged 27)	Slavia Prague	2019		11	2
8	Patrik Hidi	(Hungary)	MF	27 November 1990 (aged 28)	Budapest Honvéd	2019		35	1
11	Madiyar Raimbek	(Kazakhstan)	MF	15 August 1995 (aged 24)	loan from Kairat	2019	2019	11	0
14	Jérémy Manzorro	(France)	MF	11 November 1991 (aged 27)	Žalgiris	2019		27	6
17	Nurzhigit Smatov	(Kazakhstan)	MF	11 July 1996 (aged 23)	Kairat	2018		0	0
19	Arman Kenesov	(Kazakhstan)	MF	4 September 2000 (aged 19)	Academy	2018	2019	14	1
33	Magomed Paragulgov	(Kazakhstan)	MF	26 March 1994 (aged 25)	loan from Kairat	2019	2019	26	1
40	Carlos Fonseca	(Portugal)	MF	23 August 1987 (aged 32)	Slavia Sofia	2016	2019	141	22
47	Arman Nusip	(Kazakhstan)	MF	22 January 1994 (aged 25)	Atyrau	2019	2020	22	0
57	Artem Popov	(Kazakhstan)	MF	17 January 1998 (aged 21)	Academy	2015	2019	38	0
66	Sultan Sagnayev	(Kazakhstan)	MF	14 January 2000 (aged 19)	loan from Astana	2019	2019	6	1
88	Marko Stanojević	(Serbia)	MF	22 June 1988 (aged 31)	Levadiakos	2019		14	2
Forwards
9	Timur Muldinov	(Kazakhstan)	FW	19 September 1993 (aged 26)	Kyzylzhar	2019		18	1
10	Dejan Georgijević	(Serbia)	FW	19 January 1994 (aged 25)	loan from Ferencvárosi	2019	2019	16	2
	Arman Smailov	(Kazakhstan)	FW	4 May 1997 (aged 22)	Academy	2017	2019	21	0
Players away on loan
Left during the season
1	Nikita Kalmykov	(Kazakhstan)	GK	24 August 1989 (aged 30)	Youth Team	2009	2019		
4	Kaspars Dubra	(Latvia)	DF	20 December 1990 (aged 28)	Rīgas FS	2019	2019	14	1
7	Pavel Shabalin	(Kazakhstan)	MF	23 October 1988 (aged 31)	Atyrau	2017		238	37
10	Aslan Darabayev	(Kazakhstan)	MF	21 January 1989 (aged 30)	Tobol	2019	2019	44	7
20	Anton Tsirin	(Kazakhstan)	GK	10 August 1987 (aged 32)	Kyzylzhar	2019			
21	Momodou Ceesay	(The Gambia)	FW	24 December 1988 (aged 30)	Kyzylzhar	2019	2019	10	0
22	Bauyrzhan Tanirbergenov	(Kazakhstan)	DF	11 February 1995 (aged 24)	Altai Semey	2019	2019	4	0
50	Reynaldo	(Brazil)	FW	25 August 1989 (aged 30)	Qarabağ	2019		1	0
66	Oybek Baltabaev	(Kazakhstan)	MF	13 June 1994 (aged 25)	Kairat	2019	2019	4	0
77	Stanislav Lunin	(Kazakhstan)	DF	2 May 1993 (aged 26)	Kairat	2019	2019	5	1
88	Roger Cañas	(Colombia)	MF	27 March 1990 (aged 29)	Shakhtyor Soligorsk	2019		17	4
99	Milan Mirosavljev	(Serbia)	FW	24 April 1995 (aged 24)	Proleter Novi Sad	2019		11	0

== Transfers ==
=== In ===
Date	Position	Nationality	Name	From	Fee	Ref.
28 December 2018	MF	(Kazakhstan)	Aslan Darabayev	Tobol	Undisclosed	
29 December 2018	DF	(Kazakhstan)	Stanislav Lunin	Kairat	Free	
30 December 2018	FW	(The Gambia)	Momodou Ceesay	Kyzylzhar	Undisclosed	
30 December 2018	FW	(Kazakhstan)	Timur Muldinov	Kyzylzhar	Undisclosed	
3 January 2019	GK	(Kazakhstan)	Ilya Sotnik	Ekibastuz	Undisclosed	
4 January 2019	GK	(Kazakhstan)	Aleksandr Mokin	Astana	Undisclosed	
4 January 2019	DF	(Latvia)	Kaspars Dubra	Rīgas FS	Undisclosed	
13 January 2019	MF	(France)	Jérémy Manzorro	Žalgiris	Undisclosed	
23 January 2019	MF	(Colombia)	Roger Cañas	Shakhtyor Soligorsk	Undisclosed	
24 January 2019	MF	(Hungary)	Patrik Hidi	Budapest Honvéd	Undisclosed	
14 February 2019	DF	(Serbia)	Uroš Vitas	Mechelen	Undisclosed	
21 February 2019	FW	(Serbia)	Milan Mirosavljev	Proleter Novi Sad	Undisclosed	
21 February 2019	GK	(Kazakhstan)	Anton Tsirin	Kyzylzhar	Undisclosed	
26 February 2019	DF	(Kazakhstan)	Bauyrzhan Tanirbergenov	Altai Semey	Undisclosed	
26 February 2019	MF	(Kazakhstan)	Oybek Baltabaev	Kairat	Undisclosed	
25 June 2019	DF	(Serbia)	Miloš Stamenković	Union Saint-Gilloise	Undisclosed	
4 July 2019	FW	(Brazil)	Reynaldo	Qarabağ	Free	
9 July 2019	MF	(Serbia)	Marko Stanojević	Levadiakos	Undisclosed	
23 July 2019	MF	(Turkmenistan)	Ruslan Mingazow	Slavia Prague	Free	
Summer 2019	GK	(Kazakhstan)	Aleksandr Zarutskiy	Atyrau	Free	

=== Loans in ===
Date from	Position	Nationality	Name	From	Date to	Ref.
21 February 2019	MF	(Kazakhstan)	Madiyar Raimbek	Kairat	End of Season	
27 February 2019	FW	(Kazakhstan)	Magomed Paragulgov	Kairat	End of Season	
26 June 2019	GK	(Kazakhstan)	Andrey Pasechenko	Tobol	End of Season	
2 July 2019	FW	(Serbia)	Dejan Georgijević	Ferencvárosi	End of Season	
3 July 2019	MF	(Kazakhstan)	Sultan Sagnayev	Astana	End of Season	
6 July 2019	DF	(Kazakhstan)	Aleksandr Sokolenko	Kairat	End of Season	

=== Released ===
Date	Position	Nationality	Name	Joined	Date	Ref.
16 January 2019	GK	(Kazakhstan)	Aleksandr Mokin	Astana		
16 January 2019	MF	(Portugal)	Hugo Seco	Kisvárda	18 January 2019	
3 May 2019	MF	(Kazakhstan)	Aslan Darabayev	Zhetysu	26 June 2019	
11 June 2019	MF	(Kazakhstan)	Oybek Baltabaev			
18 June 2019	FW	(The Gambia)	Momodou Ceesay	Kyzylzhar	22 July 2019	
25 June 2019	DF	(Kazakhstan)	Bauyrzhan Tanirbergenov			
3 July 2019	GK	(Kazakhstan)	Anton Tsirin	Kyzylzhar	22 July 2019	
3 July 2019	DF	(Latvia)	Kaspars Dubra	Oleksandriya		
3 July 2019	MF	(Colombia)	Roger Cañas			
3 July 2019	MF	(Kazakhstan)	Pavel Shabalin	Taraz	24 July 2019	
3 July 2019	FW	(Serbia)	Milan Mirosavljev	Proleter Novi Sad		
Summer 2019	DF	(Kazakhstan)	Stanislav Lunin	Shakhter Karagandy	21 August 2019	
31 December 2019	GK	(Kazakhstan)	Ilya Sotnik			
31 December 2019	DF	(Kazakhstan)	Sagadat Tursynbay	Tobol	6 January 2020	
31 December 2019	DF	(Serbia)	Uroš Vitas	Partizan		
31 December 2019	MF	(France)	Jérémy Manzorro	Shakhter Karagandy	12 February 2020	
31 December 2019	MF	(Hungary)	Patrik Hidi	Budapest Honvéd	15 January 2020	
31 December 2019	MF	(Kazakhstan)	Madiyar Raimbek			
31 December 2019	MF	(Kazakhstan)	Nurzhigit Smatov			
31 December 2019	MF	(Serbia)	Marko Stanojević	Nasaf		
31 December 2019	FW	(Kazakhstan)	Timur Muldinov	Kyzylzhar		

=== Trial ===
Date From	Date To	Position	Nationality	Name	Last club	Ref.
January 2019		MF	(Gabon)	Ulysse Ndong	Al-Khor	
January 2019		MF	(Azerbaijan)	Amit Guluzade	Drita	

== Friendlies ==
19 January 2019	Irtysh Pavlodar (Kazakhstan)	2 – 1	(North Macedonia) Vardar	Turkey
(UTC+6)	Goal	Report	Goal

21 January 2019	Irtysh Pavlodar (Kazakhstan)	3 – 1	(Russia) Baltika Kaliningrad	Turkey
(UTC+6)	Shabalin; Fonseca; Trialist	Report	Goal

29 January 2019	Irtysh Pavlodar (Kazakhstan)	1 – 1	(Ukraine) Shakhtar Donetsk U21	Turkey
(UTC+6)	Ceesay	Report	Goal

1 February 2019	Irtysh Pavlodar (Kazakhstan)	2 – 0	(Russia) Spartak-2 Moscow	Turkey
(UTC+6)	4'; 59'	Report

4 February 2019	Irtysh Pavlodar (Kazakhstan)	2 – 2	(Russia) Zenit-2 St.Petersburg	Turkey
(UTC+6)	40'; 78'	Report	61'; 67'

== Competitions ==
=== Premier League ===
==== Results summary ====
Overall								Home						Away					
Pld	W	D	L	GF	GA	GD	Pts	W	D	L	GF	GA	GD	W	D	L	GF	GA	GD
33	11	4	18	30	45	−15	37	7	2	7	17	19	−2	4	2	11	13	26	−13

Last updated: 10 November 2019.
Source: See Results

==== Results by round ====
Round	1	2	3	4	5	6	7	8	9	10	11	12	13	14	15	16	17	18	19	20	21	22	23	24	25	26	27	28	29	30	31	32	33
Ground	A	A	H	H	A	H	A	H	A	H	H	A	H	A	A	H	A	H	A	A	H	H	H	A	A	H	A	H	A	H	A	H	A
Result	L	W	L	W	L	L	L	L	W	L	L	L	W	L	D	D	L	W	L	L	L	L	D	D	W	W	L	W	L	W	L	W	W
Position	9	6	7	6	7	8	10	9	9	10	10	11	9	9	9	9	9	9	10	10	11	11	11	9	9	9	9	9	9	9	9	9	8

Source: See Results
A = Away; H = Home; W = Win; D = Draw; L = Loss

==== Results ====
9 March 2019 1	Tobol	3 – 0	Irtysh Pavlodar	Kostanay
17:00 (UTC+6)	Nurgaliev 17', 35'; Turysbek 80'	Report	Paragulgov (yellow card) 58'	Stadium: Central Stadium; Attendance: 3,000; Referee: Alexsandr Gauzer

15 March 2019 2	Atyrau	1 – 3	Irtysh Pavlodar	Astana
15:00 (UTC+6)	Žunić 30'; Kubík (yellow card) 53'	Report	Fonseca 20'; Cañas 33'; Darabayev 41'	Stadium: Astana Arena; Attendance: 600; Referee: Ruslan Omarov
Note: Match played at the Astana Arena instead of Atyrau's regular home ground, Munaishy Stadium, Astana was re-named Nur-Sultan on 23 March 2019.

30 March 2019 3	Irtysh Pavlodar	0 – 1	Kaisar	Pavlodar
15:00 (UTC+6)	Vitas (yellow card) 38'; D.Shmidt (yellow card) 77'	Report	Baizhanov 90+1'; Carlitos (yellow card) 90+2'	Stadium: Central Stadium; Attendance: 5,800; Referee: Sergey Gorokhovodatskiy

6 April 2019 4	Irtysh Pavlodar	2 – 0	Taraz	Pavlodar
15:00 (UTC+6)	I.Pikalkin 18' (o.g.); S.Otarbayev 69' (o.g.); T.Muldinov (yellow card) 81'	Report	R.Rozybakiev (yellow card) 35' (yellow-red card) 39'	Stadium: Central Stadium; Attendance: 3,200; Referee: Georgiy Chekhovskiy

14 April 2019 5	Shakhter Karagandy	4 – 0	Irtysh Pavlodar	Nur-Sultan
15:00 (UTC+6)	Pešić 2', 19' (pen.); Kizito 8'; Shakhmetov (yellow card) 40'; Baranovskyi (yellow card) 48'; Tkachuk 50'	Report	Darabayev (yellow card) 30'; Cañas (yellow card) 48'; M.Raimbek (yellow card) 78'	Stadium: Astana Arena; Attendance: 1,000; Referee: Bulat Saryev
Note: Match played at the Astana Arena instead of Shakhter Karagandy's regular home ground, Shakhter Stadium, Astana was re-named Nur-Sultan on 23 March 2019.

20 April 2019 6	Irtysh Pavlodar	0 – 1	Aktobe	Pavlodar
17:00 (UTC+6)	R.Aslan (yellow card) 31'; Darabayev (yellow card) 60'; Fonseca (yellow card) 64'	Report	Aimbetov 12'; A.Kakimov (yellow card) 35'; I.Trofimets (yellow card) 82'	Stadium: Central Stadium; Attendance: 2,500; Referee: Saken Bayimbet

27 April 2019 7	Okzhetpes	1 – 0	Irtysh Pavlodar	Kokshetau
15:00 (UTC+6)	S.Zhumakhanov 26'; I.Kalinin (yellow card) 39'; Kasmynin (yellow card) 75'; Stojanović (yellow card) 83'	Report	A.Nusip (yellow card) 36'; Darabayev (yellow card) 45'; R.Yesimov (yellow card) 57'; Fonseca (yellow card) 72'; A.Popov (yellow card) 77'	Stadium: Okzhetpes Stadium; Attendance: 1,700; Referee: Timur Kumashev

1 May 2019 8	Irtysh Pavlodar	0 – 3	Zhetysu	Pavlodar
18:00 (UTC+6)	Vitas (yellow card) 28'; Mirosavljev (yellow card) 69'; Paragulgov (yellow card) 75'	Report	E.Altynbekov 17', 58'; Naumov (yellow card) 45+4'; Hovhannisyan 68'	Stadium: Central Stadium; Attendance: 1,500; Referee: Aydin Rakhimbayev

5 May 2019 9	Astana	0 – 1	Irtysh Pavlodar	Nur-Sultan
19:00 (UTC+6)	Pertsukh (yellow card) 50'; Postnikov (yellow card) 61'; Muzhikov (yellow card) 73'	Report	S.Tursynbay (yellow card) 57'; Cañas 78'	Stadium: Astana Arena; Attendance: 1,300; Referee: Artyom Kuchin
Note: Astana was re-named Nur-Sultan on 23 March 2019.

11 May 2019 10	Irtysh Pavlodar	0 – 2	Ordabasy	Pavlodar
18:00 (UTC+6)	Cañas (yellow card) 54'; Fonseca (yellow card) 65'	Report	Zhangylyshbay 42'; Paulo 58'	Stadium: Central Stadium; Attendance: 2,200; Referee: Sergey Gorokhovodatskiy

15 May 2019 19	Irtysh Pavlodar	0 – 4	Astana	Pavlodar
18:30 (UTC+6)	Tsirin (yellow card) 90+2'	Report	Kabananga 40'; Tomasov 63', 85'; Janga 90'	Stadium: Central Stadium; Attendance: 2,000; Referee: Anatolyi Vishnichenko

19 May 2019 11	Kairat	2 – 1	Irtysh Pavlodar	Almaty
19:00 (UTC+6)	Eseola 6', 41' (yellow card) 34'; Alip (yellow card) 62'; Sarsenov (yellow card) 87'	Report	D.Shmidt (yellow card) 30'; Cañas 34'	Stadium: Central Stadium; Attendance: 2,500; Referee: Furkat Atajanov

26 May 2019 12	Irtysh Pavlodar	1 – 0	Atyrau	Pavlodar
18:00 (UTC+6)	Cañas (yellow card) 46'; R.Aslan (yellow card) 59' (goal) 75'; Fonseca (yellow card) 73'	Report	Zahynaylov (yellow card) 34'; Bjedov (yellow card) 63'; Loginovsky (yellow card) 90'; A.Rodionov (yellow card) 90+4'	Stadium: Central Stadium; Attendance: 3,000; Referee: Zhandos Abzhan

31 May 2019 13	Kaisar	2 – 0	Irtysh Pavlodar	Kyzylorda
19:00 (UTC+6)	Lamanje (yellow card) 29' (goal) 84'; Barseghyan 47'; Khairullin (yellow card) 90'; John (yellow card) 90'	Report	A.Nusip (yellow card) 38'; R.Aslan (yellow card) 54'; M.Raimbek (yellow card) 88'; A.Kenesov (yellow card) 90'; R.Yesimov (yellow card) 90'; Tsirin (yellow card) 90'	Stadium: Gani Muratbayev Stadium; Attendance: 2,700; Referee: Denis Izmailov

16 June 2019 14	Taraz	0 – 0	Irtysh Pavlodar	Taraz
17:00 (UTC+6)		Report	Vitas (yellow card) 35'; Paragulgov (yellow card) 48'	Stadium: Central Stadium; Attendance: 3,000; Referee: Arman Ismuratov

23 June 2019 15	Irtysh Pavlodar	0 – 0	Shakhter Karagandy	Pavlodar
19:00 (UTC+6)	Cañas (yellow card) 46'; Paragulgov (yellow card) 49'	Report	N.Shugayev (red card) 72'	Stadium: Central Stadium; Attendance: 3,000; Referee: Askhat Abdanbayev

30 June 2019 16	Aktobe	2 – 1	Irtysh Pavlodar	Aktobe
20:00 (UTC+6)	R.Temirkhan (yellow card) 57'; A.Kakimov 68'; B.Kairov (yellow card) 69'; Volkov 83'	Report	T.Muldinov 10'; Fonseca (yellow card) 64'	Stadium: Central Stadium; Attendance: 7,000; Referee: Daniyar Sakhi

6 July 2019 17	Irtysh Pavlodar	2 – 1	Okzhetpes	Pavlodar
19:00 (UTC+6)	Fonseca (yellow card) 40'; Vitas 50', 74' (yellow card) 90+4'; Manzorro (yellow card) 68'	Report	Dmitrijev (yellow card) 16'; Moldakaraev 52'; S.Zhumakhanov (yellow card) 87'; Nusserbayev (yellow card) 90+4'	Stadium: Central Stadium; Attendance: 2,800; Referee: Sergey Gorokhovodatskiy

13 July 2019 18	Zhetysu	4 – 0	Irtysh Pavlodar	Taldıqorğan
19:00 (UTC+6)	O.Kerimzhanov 29'; Y.Tapalov (yellow card) 41'; Adamović 45+3'; E.Altynbekov 47' (yellow card) 52'; Lebedzew (yellow card) 61'; Stepanyuk 75'	Report	R.Yesimov (yellow card) 63'; Manzorro (yellow card) 66'; S.Sagnayev (yellow card) 73'; A.Pasechenko (yellow card) 77'	Stadium: Zhetysu Stadium; Attendance: 2,500; Referee: Saken Bayimbet

28 July 2019 20	Ordabasy	1 – 0	Irtysh Pavlodar	Shymkent
20:00 (UTC+6)	Diakate (yellow card) 64'; Shchotkin 75'; S.Shamshi (yellow card) 90+4'	Report	S.Sagnayev (yellow card) 17'; Stamenković (yellow card) 64'	Stadium: Kazhymukan Munaitpasov Stadium; Attendance: 5,500; Referee: Bakhyt Kyzylbaev

4 August 2019 21	Irtysh Pavlodar	0 – 2	Kairat	Pavlodar
19:00 (UTC+6)	Fonseca (yellow card) 65'	Report	Kosović (yellow card) 11' (yellow-red card) 25'; S.Astanov 20'; Abiken 68'	Stadium: Central Stadium; Attendance: 3,600; Referee: Georgiy Chekhovskiy

11 August 2019 22	Irtysh Pavlodar	0 – 2	Tobol	Pavlodar
19:30 (UTC+6)	Stanojević (yellow card) 64'; Hidi (yellow card) 73'; R.Yesimov (yellow card) 80'; Fonseca (yellow card) 82'	Report	Turysbek 60'; Fedin 74' (pen.)	Stadium: Central Stadium; Attendance: 3,000; Referee: Saken Bayimbet

17 August 2019 23	Irtysh Pavlodar	0 – 0	Tobol	Pavlodar
18:00 (UTC+6)	Manzorro (yellow card) 41'; Mingazow (yellow card) 74'; Stanojević (yellow card) 83'; Stamenković (yellow card) 90+4'	Report	Valiullin (yellow card) 47'; Kankava (yellow card) 88'; Dmitrenko (yellow card) 90+4'	Stadium: Central Stadium; Attendance: 2,500; Referee: Askhhat Abdanbayev

25 August 2019 24	Aktobe	1 – 1	Irtysh Pavlodar	Aktobe
20:00 (UTC+6)	Volkov (yellow card) 29'; O.Kitsak (yellow card) 38'; Aimbetov 85'	Report	A.Sokolenko (yellow card) 4'; Fonseca (yellow card) 45+3'; D.Shmidt (yellow card) 55'; Stanojević 63' (yellow card) 88'; Stamenković (yellow card) 90+3'	Stadium: Central Stadium; Attendance: 7,000; Referee: Arman Ismuratov

31 August 2019 25	Atyrau	0 – 3	Irtysh Pavlodar	Atyrau
19:30 (UTC+6)	Ustinov (red card) 19'; A.Rodionov (yellow card) 78'	Report	Stanojević 5' (yellow card) 50'; D.Shmidt (yellow card) 22'; T.Muldinov (yellow card) 26'; Vitas (yellow card) 75'; Manzorro 90+2'; Hidi 90+4'	Stadium: Munaishy Stadium; Attendance: 3,500; Referee: Ruslan Omarov

15 September 2019 26	Irtysh Pavlodar	1 – 0	Taraz	Pavlodar
18:00 (UTC+6)	Georgijević 12'	Report		Stadium: Central Stadium; Attendance: 3,800; Referee: Aydin Rakhimbayev

21 September 2019 27	Okzhetpes	1 – 0	Irtysh Pavlodar	Kokshetau
15:00 (UTC+6)	Moldakaraev (yellow card) 24'; Stojanović 63'; Zorić (yellow card) 72'	Report	Vitas (yellow card) 83'	Stadium: Okzhetpes Stadium; Attendance: 1,700; Referee: Daniyar Sakhi

28 September 2019 28	Irtysh Pavlodar	4 – 2	Shakhter Karagandy	Pavlodar
16:00 (UTC+6)	Georgijević 66'; Manzorro 68', 86'; Mingazow 90'	Report	Kizito 15', 36' (yellow card) 75'; Chichulin (yellow card) 87'	Stadium: Central Stadium; Attendance: 2,000; Referee: Georgiy Chekhovskiy

5 October 2019 29	Zhetysu	2 – 1	Irtysh Pavlodar	Taldıqorğan
15:00 (UTC+6)	Darabayev 55' (yellow card) 83'; O.Kerimzhanov (yellow card) 64'; Toshev 88'	Report	R.Yesimov 8'; Stamenković (yellow card) 55' (yellow-red card) 89'; T.Muldinov (yellow card) 67'	Stadium: Zhetysu Stadium; Attendance: 2,500; Referee: Arman Ismuratov

19 October 2019 30	Irtysh Pavlodar	2 – 1	Kaisar	Pavlodar
16:00 (UTC+6)	Manzorro (yellow card) 11' (goal) 37' (pen.); R.Yesimov 51'	Report	Bitang (yellow card) 15'; Marochkin (red card) 36'; Narzildaev (yellow card) 36'; Lamanje 56'; Sadownichy (yellow card) 62' (yellow-red card) 80'	Stadium: Central Stadium; Attendance: 1,200; Referee: Furkat Atajanov

26 October 2019 31	Ordabasy	2 – 0	Irtysh Pavlodar	Shymkent
15:00 (UTC+6)	Badibanga (yellow card) 54'; Malyi 79'; João Paulo (yellow card) 82'; Mahlangu 84'	Report	Vitas (yellow card) 50'	Stadium: Kazhymukan Munaitpasov Stadium; Attendance: 4,000; Referee: Denis Tevyashov

3 November 2019 32	Irtysh Pavlodar	5 – 0	Kairat	Pavlodar
15:00 (UTC+6)	Vitas (yellow card) 12'; S.Sagnayev 38'; Georgijević (yellow card) 64'; Manzorro 65' (yellow card) 68'; A.Kenesov (yellow card) 71' (goal) 86'; Stamenković 80'; Fonseca 90+2'	Report	Abiken (yellow card) 64'; Suyumbayev (yellow card) 71'; Mikanović (yellow card) 88'; Kuat (yellow card) 90+1'	Stadium: Central Stadium; Attendance: 1,500; Referee: Igor Chesnokov

10 November 2019 33	Astana	0 – 2	Irtysh Pavlodar	Nur-Sultan
15:00 (UTC+6)	Pertsukh (yellow card) 56'; Postnikov (yellow card) 75'	Report	Manzorro 43'; Hidi (yellow card) 59'; Mingazow 68'	Stadium: Astana Arena; Attendance: 2,000; Referee: Denis Izmailov
Note: Astana was re-named Nur-Sultan on 23 March 2019.

==== League table ====
Pos	Team	Pld	W	D	L	GF	GA	GD	Pts	Qualification or relegation
6	Kaisar	33	12	6	15	37	43	−6	42	Qualification for the Europa League second qualifying round (Note: Kaisar qualified for the Europa League second qualifying round by winning the 2019 Kazakhstan Cup.)
7	Okzhetpes	33	11	7	15	44	49	−5	40	
8	Irtysh Pavlodar	33	11	4	18	30	45	−15	37	
9	Shakhter Karagandy	33	9	8	16	40	47	−7	35	
10	Taraz (O)	33	7	8	18	28	60	−32	29	Qualification for the relegation play-offs

Source: UEFA, Soccerway
Rules for classification: 1) Points; 2) Goal difference; 3) Matches won; 4) Goals scored; 5) Away goals scored; 6) Head-to-head points; 7) Head-to-head matches won; 8) Head-to-head goal difference; 9) Head-to-head goals scored; 10) Head-to-head away goals scored; 11) Draw.
(O) Play-off winners

=== Kazakhstan Cup ===
10 April 2019 Last 16	Aktobe	3 – 3 (a.e.t.) (1 – 3 p)	Irtysh Pavlodar	Kostanay
14:00 (UTC+6)	Aimbetov 27', 64'; B.Kairov (yellow card) 32'; Miličević (yellow card) 56' (goal) 111'; Volkov (yellow card) 75'; Radin (yellow card) 99'	Report	Cañas 17'; Lunin 51'; Dubra 105'	Stadium: Central Stadium; Attendance: 500; Referee: Anatoly Vishnichenko
	Penalties
	Miličević (penalty scored); Aimbetov (penalty missed); Volkov (penalty missed); Radin (penalty missed)		(penalty scored) Cañas; (penalty scored) Vitas; (penalty scored) Fonseca; (penalty missed) A.Popov
Note: Match played at Tobol's Central Stadium in Kostanay, instead of Aktobes regular Central Stadium in Aktobe.

8 May 2019 Quarterfinal	Irtysh Pavlodar	1 – 2	Kaisar	Pavlodar
18:30 (UTC+6)	Paragulgov 15'; Manzorro (yellow card) 36'; Fonseca (yellow card) 49'; S.Tursynbay (yellow card) 55'	Report	Carlitos (yellow card) 26'; S.Abzalov (yellow card) 61'; Sadownichy 69'; Tagybergen 88'	Stadium: Central Stadium; Attendance: 2,000; Referee: Alexander Gauzer

== Squad statistics ==
As of match played 10 November 2019

=== Appearances and goals ===
No.	Pos	Nat	Player	Total		Premier League		Kazakhstan Cup	
No.	Pos	Nat	Player	Apps	Goals	Apps	Goals	Apps	Goals
1	GK	(Kazakhstan) KAZ	Aleksandr Zarutskiy	7	0	7	0	0	0
2	DF	(Kazakhstan) KAZ	Rafkat Aslan	20	1	15+4	1	1	0
5	DF	(Serbia) SRB	Uroš Vitas	21	2	20	2	1	0
7	MF	(Turkmenistan) TKM	Ruslan Mingazow	11	2	6+5	2	0	0
8	MF	(Hungary) HUN	Patrik Hidi	35	1	33	1	2	0
9	FW	(Kazakhstan) KAZ	Timur Muldinov	18	1	10+7	1	0+1	0
10	FW	(Serbia) SRB	Dejan Georgijević	16	2	11+5	2	0	0
11	MF	(Kazakhstan) KAZ	Madiyar Raimbek	11	0	2+8	0	0+1	0
14	MF	(France) FRA	Jérémy Manzorro	27	6	24+2	6	1	0
15	DF	(Kazakhstan) KAZ	Dmitry Shmidt	34	0	32	0	2	0
19	MF	(Kazakhstan) KAZ	Arman Kenesov	12	1	2+10	1	0	0
22	GK	(Kazakhstan) KAZ	Andrey Pasechenko	9	0	9	0	0	0
23	DF	(Kazakhstan) KAZ	Sagadat Tursynbay	13	0	9+3	0	1	0
25	DF	(Kazakhstan) KAZ	Ruslan Yesimov	22	2	19+3	2	0	0
32	DF	(Serbia) SRB	Miloš Stamenković	16	1	16	1	0	0
33	MF	(Kazakhstan) KAZ	Magomed Paragulgov	26	1	20+4	0	1+1	1
40	MF	(Portugal) POR	Carlos Fonseca	27	2	22+3	2	2	0
47	MF	(Kazakhstan) KAZ	Arman Nusip	21	0	13+8	0	0	0
57	MF	(Kazakhstan) KAZ	Artem Popov	15	0	8+5	0	2	0
66	MF	(Kazakhstan) KAZ	Sultan Sagnayev	6	1	3+3	1	0	0
77	DF	(Kazakhstan) KAZ	Aleksandr Sokolenko	6	0	4+2	0	0	0
88	MF	(Serbia) SRB	Marko Stanojević	14	2	14	2	0	0
Players away from Irtysh Pavlodar on loan:
Players who left Irtysh Pavlodar during the season:
1	GK	(Kazakhstan) KAZ	Nikita Kalmykov	5	0	5	0	0	0
4	DF	(Latvia) LAT	Kaspars Dubra	14	1	12	0	2	1
7	MF	(Kazakhstan) KAZ	Pavel Shabalin	6	0	1+5	0	0	0
10	MF	(Kazakhstan) KAZ	Aslan Darabayev	8	1	7	1	1	0
20	GK	(Kazakhstan) KAZ	Anton Tsirin	14	0	12	0	2	0
21	FW	(The Gambia) GAM	Momodou Ceesay	10	0	2+7	0	1	0
22	DF	(Kazakhstan) KAZ	Bauyrzhan Tanirbergenov	4	0	0+3	0	0+1	0
50	FW	(Brazil) BRA	Reynaldo	1	0	0+1	0	0	0
66	MF	(Kazakhstan) KAZ	Oybek Baltabaev	3	0	1+1	0	0+1	0
77	DF	(Kazakhstan) KAZ	Stanislav Lunin	5	1	3+1	0	1	1
88	MF	(Colombia) COL	Roger Cañas	17	4	15	3	2	1
99	FW	(Serbia) SRB	Milan Mirosavljev	11	0	6+5	0	0	0

=== Goal scorers ===
Place	Position	Nation	Number	Name	Premier League	Kazakhstan Cup	Total
1	MF	(France)	14	Jérémy Manzorro	6	0	6
2	MF	(Colombia)	88	Roger Cañas	3	1	4
3	DF	(Serbia)	5	Uroš Vitas	2	0	2
3	MF	(Serbia)	88	Marko Stanojević	2	0	2
3	FW	(Serbia)	10	Dejan Georgijević	2	0	2
3	DF	(Kazakhstan)	25	Ruslan Yesimov	2	0	2
3	MF	(Portugal)	40	Carlos Fonseca	2	0	2
3	MF	(Turkmenistan)	7	Ruslan Mingazow	2	0	2
3				Own goal	2	0	2
10	MF	(Kazakhstan)	10	Aslan Darabayev	1	0	1
10	DF	(Kazakhstan)	2	Rafkat Aslan	1	0	1
10	FW	(Kazakhstan)	9	Timur Muldinov	1	0	1
10	MF	(Hungary)	8	Patrik Hidi	1	0	1
10	MF	(Kazakhstan)	66	Sultan Sagnayev	1	0	1
10	DF	(Serbia)	32	Miloš Stamenković	1	0	1
10	MF	(Kazakhstan)	19	Arman Kenesov	1	0	1
10	DF	(Kazakhstan)	77	Stanislav Lunin	0	1	1
10	DF	(Latvia)	4	Kaspars Dubra	0	1	1
10	MF	(Kazakhstan)	33	Magomed Paragulgov	0	1	1
				TOTALS	30	4	34

=== Disciplinary record ===
Number	Nation	Position	Name	Premier League		Kazakhstan Cup		Total	
Number	Nation	Position	Name	Yellow card	Red card	Yellow card	Red card	Yellow card	Red card
2	(Kazakhstan)	DF	Rafkat Aslan	3	0	0	0	3	0
5	(Serbia)	DF	Uroš Vitas	8	0	0	0	8	0
7	(Turkmenistan)	MF	Ruslan Mingazow	1	0	0	0	1	0
8	(Hungary)	MF	Patrik Hidi	2	0	0	0	2	0
9	(Kazakhstan)	FW	Timur Muldinov	3	0	0	0	3	0
10	(Serbia)	FW	Dejan Georgijević	1	0	0	0	1	0
11	(Kazakhstan)	MF	Madiyar Raimbek	2	0	0	0	2	0
14	(France)	MF	Jérémy Manzorro	5	0	1	0	6	0
15	(Kazakhstan)	DF	Dmitry Shmidt	4	0	0	0	4	0
19	(Kazakhstan)	MF	Arman Kenesov	2	0	0	0	2	0
22	(Kazakhstan)	GK	Andrey Pasechenko	1	0	0	0	1	0
23	(Kazakhstan)	DF	Sagadat Tursynbay	1	0	1	0	2	0
25	(Kazakhstan)	DF	Ruslan Yesimov	4	0	0	0	4	0
32	(Serbia)	DF	Miloš Stamenković	5	1	0	0	5	1
33	(Kazakhstan)	MF	Magomed Paragulgov	4	0	0	0	4	0
40	(Portugal)	MF	Carlos Fonseca	9	0	1	0	10	0
47	(Kazakhstan)	MF	Arman Nusip	2	0	0	0	2	0
57	(Kazakhstan)	MF	Artem Popov	1	0	0	0	1	0
66	(Kazakhstan)	MF	Sultan Sagnayev	2	0	0	0	2	0
77	(Kazakhstan)	DF	Aleksandr Sokolenko	1	0	0	0	1	0
88	(Serbia)	MF	Marko Stanojević	4	0	0	0	4	0
Players who left Irtysh Pavlodar during the season:
10	(Kazakhstan)	MF	Aslan Darabayev	3	0	0	0	3	0
20	(Kazakhstan)	GK	Anton Tsirin	2	0	0	0	2	0
88	(Colombia)	MF	Roger Cañas	4	0	0	0	4	0
99	(Serbia)	FW	Milan Mirosavljev	1	0	0	0	1	0
			TOTALS	75	1	3	0	78	1
