= Pavel Shabalin =

Kazakhstani footballer

Personal information
- Date of birth: October 23, 1988 (age 38)
- Place of birth: Aksu, Kazakh SSR, Soviet Union
- Height: 1.84 m (6 ft 0 in)
- Position: Midfielder

Team information
- Current team: Taraz
- Number: 37

Senior career*
Years	Team	Apps	(Gls)
2006–2007	Irtysh-2	44	(13)
2007–2013	Irtysh Pavlodar	163	(24)
2014–2015	Aktobe	26	(1)
2015	Okzhetpes	12	(1)
2016–2017	Atyrau	25	(3)
2017–2019	Irtysh Pavlodar	47	(6)
2019–	Taraz	0	(0)

International career^{‡}
2009	Kazakhstan U-21	6	(1)
2012–	Kazakhstan	3	(0)
- * Club domestic league appearances and goals as of 28 July 2019 (UTC) ‡ National team caps and goals as of 6 October 2015

Pavel Shabalin (born 23 October 1988) is a Kazakhstani footballer who plays for Kazakhstan Premier League club FC Taraz as a midfielder.

== Career ==
=== Club ===
On 3 July 2019, Shabalin was released by Irtysh Pavlodar, going on to sign for FC Taraz on 24 July 2019, until the end of the 2019 season.

== Career statistics ==
=== Club ===
As of match played 30 June 2019

Appearances and goals by club, season and competition
Club	Season	League			National Cup		Continental		Other		Total	
Club	Season	Division	Apps	Goals	Apps	Goals	Apps	Goals	Apps	Goals	Apps	Goals
Irtysh-2	2006	Kazakhstan First Division	23	5	1	0	-		-		24	5
Irtysh-2	2007	Kazakhstan First Division	21	8			-		-		9	0
Irtysh-2	Total		44	13	1	0	-	-	-	-	45	13
Irtysh	2007	Kazakhstan Premier League	9	0	0	0	-		-		9	0
Irtysh	2008	Kazakhstan Premier League	28	5	1	0	-		-		28	5
Irtysh	2009	Kazakhstan Premier League	24	3	4	2	1	0	-		29	4
Irtysh	2010	Kazakhstan Premier League	29	4	1	0	-		-		30	4
Irtysh	2011	Kazakhstan Premier League	22	4	2	0	1	0	-		25	4
Irtysh	2012	Kazakhstan Premier League	23	5	6	3	-		-		29	8
Irtysh	2013	Kazakhstan Premier League	28	3	4	2	4	0	-		36	5
Irtysh	Total		163	24	18	7	6	0	-	-	187	31
Aktobe	2014	Kazakhstan Premier League	22	1	2	0	2	0	1	0	27	1
Aktobe	2015	Kazakhstan Premier League	4	0	1	0	0	0	-		5	0
Aktobe	Total		26	1	3	0	2	0	1	0	32	1
Okzhetpes	2015	Kazakhstan Premier League	12	1	0	0	-		-		12	1
Atyrau	2016	Kazakhstan Premier League	25	3	3	0	-		-		28	3
Irtysh	2017	Kazakhstan Premier League	21	0	1	0	1	0	-		23	0
Irtysh	2018	Kazakhstan Premier League	20	6	1	0	0	0	1	0	22	6
Irtysh	2019	Kazakhstan Premier League	6	0	0	0	-		-		6	0
Irtysh	Total		47	6	2	0	1	0	1	0	51	6
Career total			317	47	27	7	9	0	2	0	355	54

=== International ===
Kazakhstan
Year	Apps	Goals
2012	1	0
2013	2	0
Total	3	0

Statistics accurate as of match played 15 October 2013

== Honours ==
Aktobe

- Kazakhstan Super Cup: 2014
