= Dejan Georgijević =

Serbian footballer

Personal information
- Date of birth: 19 January 1994 (age 32)
- Place of birth: Belgrade, FR Yugoslavia
- Height: 1.83 m (6 ft 0 in)
- Position: Striker

Youth career
- Zemun
- 2011–2012: Partizan

Senior career*
Years	Team	Apps	(Gls)
2010–2011	Zemun	6	(0)
2012–2014	Teleoptik	58	(8)
2014–2015	Spartak Subotica	16	(3)
2015–2016	Inđija	27	(14)
2016–2018	Voždovac	41	(12)
2018–2021	Ferencváros	7	(1)
2019	→ Partizan (loan)	3	(0)
2019	→ Irtysh Pavlodar (loan)	16	(2)
2021	Velež Mostar	19	(5)
2021–2022	Domžale	17	(4)
2022	Simba SC		(1)
2023	Công An Hà Nội	0	(0)
2023	Posušje	6	(1)
2023–2024	OFK Beograd	35	(17)
2024	Telavi	12	(6)
2025	Kauno Žalgiris	30	(11)
- * Club domestic league appearances and goals as of 12 December 2025

Dejan Georgijević (Serbian Cyrillic: Дејан Георгијевић; born 19 January 1994) is a Serbian professional footballer who plays as a Forward for Lithuanian Kauno Žalgiris Club.

== Career ==
On 27 February 2025 Georgijević signed with Lithuanian Kauno Žalgiris Club.

== Career statistics ==
As of 4 August 2022

Appearances and goals by club, season and competition
Club	Season	League			National cup		Other		Total	
Club	Season	Division	Apps	Goals	Apps	Goals	Apps	Goals	Apps	Goals
Zemun	2009–10	Serbian First League	1	0	0	0	—		1	0
Zemun	2010–11	Serbian First League	5	0	0	0	—		5	0
Zemun	Total		6	0	0	0	—		6	0
Teleoptik	2011–12	Serbian First League	7	0	0	0	—		7	0
Teleoptik	2012–13	Serbian First League	25	2	0	0	—		25	2
Teleoptik	2013–14	Serbian First League	26	6	1	0	—		27	6
Teleoptik	Total		58	8	1	0	—		59	8
Spartak Subotica	2014–15	Serbian SuperLiga	14	3	3	0	—		17	3
Spartak Subotica	2015–16	Serbian SuperLiga	2	0	0	0	—		2	0
Spartak Subotica	Total		16	3	3	0	—		19	3
Inđija	2015–16	Serbian First League	27	14	1	0	—		28	14
Voždovac	2016–17	Serbian SuperLiga	25	3	2	0	—		27	3
Voždovac	2017–18	Serbian SuperLiga	16	9	1	0	—		17	9
Voždovac	Total		41	12	3	0	—		44	12
Ferencváros	2017–18	Nemzeti Bajnokság I	7	1	—		—		7	1
Partizan (loan)	2018–19	Serbian SuperLiga	3	0	2	0	—		5	0
Irtysh Pavlodar (loan)	2019	Kazakhstan Premier League	16	2	0	0	—		16	2
Velež Mostar	2020–21	Bosnian Premier League	14	4	—		—		14	4
Velež Mostar	2021–22	Bosnian Premier League	5	1	0	0	6 (Note: Appearance(s) in UEFA Europa Conference League)	1	11	2
Velež Mostar	Total		19	5	0	0	6	1	25	6
Domžale	2021–22	Slovenian PrvaLiga	17	4	2	1	—		19	5
Career total			210	49	12	1	6	1	228	51

== Honours ==
Partizan

- Serbian Cup: 2018–19

FK Kauno Žalgiris

- A Lyga: 2025
