= Ismaël Béko Fofana =

Ivorian footballer

Béko Fofana
Personal information
- Full name: Ismaël Béko Fofana
- Date of birth: 8 September 1988 (age 38)
- Place of birth: Abidjan, Ivory Coast
- Height: 1.82 m (6 ft 0 in)
- Position: Striker

Youth career
- Académie MimoSifcom

Senior career*
| Years | Team | Apps | (Gls) |
| 2005–2006 | ASEC Mimosas | | |
| 2006–2010 | Charlton Athletic | 0 | (0) |
| 2007–2008 | → Fredrikstad (loan) | 24 | (1) |
| 2008–2009 | → Cherbourg (loan) | 1 | (0) |
| 2009–2010 | → Saint-Lô (loan) | | |
| 2010–2011 | Séwé Sport | | |
| 2012–2013 | Shirak | 31 | (15) |
| 2012–2013 | → Zob Ahan (loan) | 14 | (1) |
| 2013–2016 | Partizan | 16 | (6) |
| 2015 | → Qingdao Jonoon (loan) | 25 | (5) |
| 2016–2018 | Čukarički | 26 | (5) |
| 2017 | → Irtysh Pavlodar (loan) | 29 | (4) |
| 2018 | Vojvodina | 13 | (2) |
| 2019 | Zira | 11 | (1) |
| 2020–2021 | IMT | 21 | (8) |
| 2021–2022 | Alashkert | 32 | (4) |

International career
| 2005 | Ivory Coast U17 | 3 | (1) |
| 2008 | Ivory Coast U23 | | |
- * Club domestic league appearances and goals as of 9 December 2022

Ismaël Béko Fofana (born 8 September 1988) is an Ivorian professional footballer who plays as a striker.

Fofana represented his country at all youth international levels from Under-17 to Under-23.

== Club career ==
=== Early years ===
Born in Abidjan, Fofana came through the MimoSifcom academy, before being promoted to the first team of ASEC Mimosas at the age of 16 in 2005. He made his CAF Champions League debut during that year, even scoring once against Egyptian club Zamalek. He again played that competition the following year with the Mimosas, before signing with English side Charlton Athletic, as a result of the cooperation between these two clubs.

Subsequently, Fofana was loaned to Norwegian club Fredrikstad. However, his contract with FFK was terminated in September 2008, after failing to make an impact at the club, scoring only two goals in two seasons.

Fofana then spent some time with French clubs Cherbourg and Saint-Lô, playing in the lower leagues, but without much success. He eventually moved back to his homeland and spent the next two seasons with Séwé Sport.

=== Shirak ===
In January 2012, Fofana came to Europe for the second time by joining Armenian club Shirak. He was their leading scorer in the 2012–13 season with 14 goals, despite leaving the club in the middle of the season. In December 2012, Fofana was loaned to Iranian club Zob Ahan. He returned to Shirak the following summer for their qualification matches for the UEFA Champions League. Fofana scored a hat-trick in the first leg of the first qualifying round against Sammarinese champions Tre Penne. He also showed good performances in a second qualifying round tie against Partizan, securing a transfer to the Serbian club after agreement between two clubs.

=== Partizan ===
On 6 August 2013, it was announced that Fofana signed a four-year contract with Partizan. He was officially presented the following day and was given the number 10 shirt. On 17 August 2013, Fofana made his official debut for the club in a 0–0 away league draw against Radnički Niš. He scored his first competitive goal for Partizan in a 5–1 home league win over Radnički Kragujevac on 25 August 2013.

In the 2015 winter transfer window, Fofana was sent on loan to Chinese club Qingdao Jonoon.

After returning to Partizan from his season-long loan, Fofana appeared in only one league game, before being released by the club in the summer of 2016.

=== Čukarički ===
On 25 June 2016, it was announced that Fofana signed a two-year contract with Čukarički. He made his official debut for the club only five days later, playing the full 90 minutes in a 3–0 home win over Kazakh club Ordabasy in the first leg of the 2016–17 UEFA Europa League first qualifying round. On 21 July 2016, Fofana scored his first goal for Čukarički in a 1–1 home draw with Hungarian club Videoton in the return leg of the Europa League second qualifying round.

=== Irtysh Pavlodar loan ===
On 1 March 2017, Fofana joined Irtysh Pavlodar on loan until the end of the 2016/17 season.

=== Vojvodina ===
On 30 June 2018, Fofana signed a two-year deal with Vojvodina. On 18 December 2018 Fofana and Vojvodina reached an agreement to mutually terminate the contract.

=== Zira ===
On 28 January 2019, Fofana signed a deal with Zira, leaving in May 2019 at the end of his contract.

== International career ==
Fofana was the top scorer of the Ivorian national under-17 team in their successful qualifying campaign for the 2005 African U-17 Championship, as well as their top scorer in the final tournament. He also played at the 2005 FIFA U-17 World Championship, scoring in their opening match against Italy U17.

In preparation for the 2008 Summer Olympics, Fofana was a member of the Ivorian U23 team at the 2008 Toulon Tournament, scoring the opener against Japan in the third-place match. He then missed in the penalty shoot-out, but Ivory Coast eventually managed to win the bronze medal.

== Career statistics ==
=== Club ===
As of match played 10 November 2018

Appearances and goals by club, season and competition
| Club | Season | League | | | National Cup | | League Cup | | Continental | | Other | | Total | |
| Club | Season | Division | Apps | Goals | Apps | Goals | Apps | Goals | Apps | Goals | Apps | Goals | Apps | Goals |
|---|---|---|---|---|---|---|---|---|---|---|---|---|---|---|
| Charlton Athletic | 2006–07 | Premier League | 0 | 0 | 0 | 0 | 0 | 0 | — | | — | | 0 | 0 |
| Charlton Athletic | 2007–08 | Championship | 0 | 0 | 0 | 0 | 0 | 0 | — | | — | | 0 | 0 |
| Charlton Athletic | 2008–09 | Championship | 0 | 0 | 0 | 0 | 0 | 0 | — | | — | | 0 | 0 |
| Charlton Athletic | 2009–10 | League One | 0 | 0 | 0 | 0 | 0 | 0 | — | | — | | 0 | 0 |
| Charlton Athletic | Total | | 0 | 0 | 0 | 0 | 0 | 0 | — | | — | | 0 | 0 |
| Fredrikstad (loan) | 2007 | Tippeligaen | 23 | 1 | 0 | 0 | — | | 0 | 0 | — | | 23 | 1 |
| Fredrikstad (loan) | 2008 | Tippeligaen | 1 | 0 | 0 | 0 | — | | — | | — | | 1 | 0 |
| Fredrikstad (loan) | Total | | 24 | 1 | 0 | 0 | — | | 0 | 0 | — | | 24 | 1 |
| AS Cherbourg (loan) | 2008–09 | National | 1 | 0 | 0 | 0 | — | | — | | — | | 1 | 0 |
| Saint-Lô Manche (loan) | 2009–10 | CFA 2 | | | | | — | | 0 | 0 | — | | | |
| Séwé Sport | 2010 | Ivorian Ligue 1 | | | | | — | | | | — | | | |
| Séwé Sport | 2011 | Ivorian Ligue 1 | | | | | — | | | | — | | | |
| Séwé Sport | Total | | | | | | — | | | | — | | | |
| Shirak | 2011 | Armenian Premier League | 0 | 0 | 0 | 0 | — | | 3 | 0 | — | | 3 | 0 |
| Shirak | 2012–13 | Armenian Premier League | 30 | 14 | 0 | 0 | — | | 4 | 0 | — | | 34 | 14 |
| Shirak | 2013–14 | Armenian Premier League | 1 | 1 | 0 | 0 | — | | 4 | 3 | — | | 5 | 4 |
| Shirak | Total | | 31 | 15 | 0 | 0 | — | | 11 | 3 | — | | 42 | 18 |
| Zob Ahan Esfahan (loan) | 2012–13 | Persian Gulf Pro League | 14 | 1 | 1 | 0 | — | | — | | — | | 15 | 1 |
| Partizan | 2013–14 | Serbian SuperLiga | 10 | 4 | 2 | 1 | — | | — | | — | | 12 | 0 |
| Partizan | 2014–15 | Serbian SuperLiga | 5 | 2 | 1 | 1 | — | | 3 | 0 | — | | 9 | 3 |
| Partizan | 2015–16 | Serbian SuperLiga | 1 | 0 | 0 | 0 | — | | — | | — | | 1 | 0 |
| Partizan | Total | | 16 | 6 | 3 | 2 | — | | 3 | 0 | — | | 22 | 8 |
| Qingdao Jonoon (loan) | 2015 | China League One | 25 | 5 | 1 | 0 | — | | — | | — | | 26 | 5 |
| Čukarički | 2016–17 | Serbian SuperLiga | 17 | 4 | 2 | 1 | — | | 4 | 1 | — | | 23 | 6 |
| Čukarički | 2017–18 | Serbian SuperLiga | 9 | 1 | 1 | 0 | — | | — | | — | | 10 | 1 |
| Čukarički | Total | | 26 | 5 | 3 | 1 | — | | 4 | 1 | — | | 33 | 7 |
| Irtysh Pavlodar (loan) | 2017 | Kazakhstan Premier League | 29 | 4 | 2 | 1 | — | | 4 | 0 | — | | 35 | 5 |
| Vojvodina | 2018–19 | Serbian SuperLiga | 13 | 2 | 1 | 0 | — | | — | | — | | 14 | 2 |
| Career total | | | 179 | 39 | 11 | 4 | 0 | 0 | 24 | 4 | 0 | 0 | 214 | 47 |

== Honours ==
=== Club ===
ASEC Mimosas

- Ligue 1: 2005, 2006
- Coupe de Côte d'Ivoire: 2005

Shirak

- Armenian Cup: 2011–12

Partizan

- Serbian Cup: 2015–16

=== International ===
Ivory Coast

- African U-17 Championship Bronze Medal: 2005
- Toulon Tournament Bronze Medal: 2008
