= Adri Gómez =

Spanish footballer (born 1994)

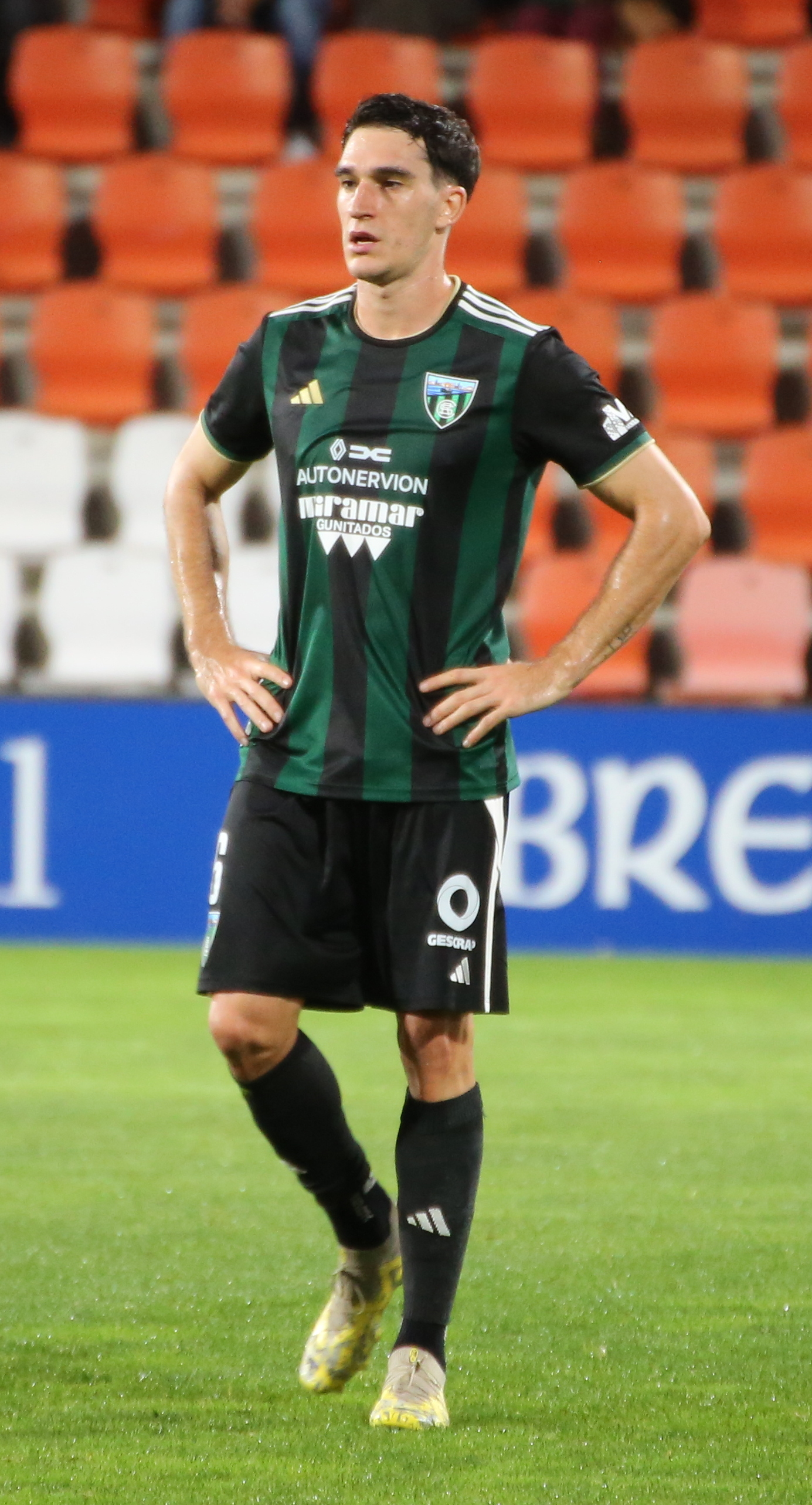
- Gómez with Sestao River in 2024

Personal information
- Full name: Adrián Gómez Ramírez
- Date of birth: 17 January 1994 (age 32)
- Place of birth: Cuenca, Spain
- Height: 1.77 m (5 ft 9 1/2 in)
- Positions: Centre back; defensive midfielder

Team information
- Current team: Avilés
- Number: 16

Youth career
- Conquense
- EMF Cuenca
- Valencia

Senior career*
Years	Team	Apps	(Gls)
2013	Valencia B	2	(0)
2013–2014	La Roda	19	(0)
2014–2015	Albacete B	30	(0)
2014–2019	Albacete	40	(1)
2018	→ Irtysh Pavlodar (loan)	29	(0)
2019	Podbeskidzie	8	(0)
2019–2023	Valencia B	89	(0)
2023–2024	Unionistas	29	(0)
2024–2025	Sestao River	34	(1)
2025–	Avilés	34	(1)
- * Club domestic league appearances and goals as of 9 June 2026

Adrián "Adri" Gómez Ramírez (born 17 January 1994) is a Spanish professional footballer who plays for Primera Federación club Avilés. A versatile player, he can either play as a central defender or as a defensive midfielder.

== Club career ==
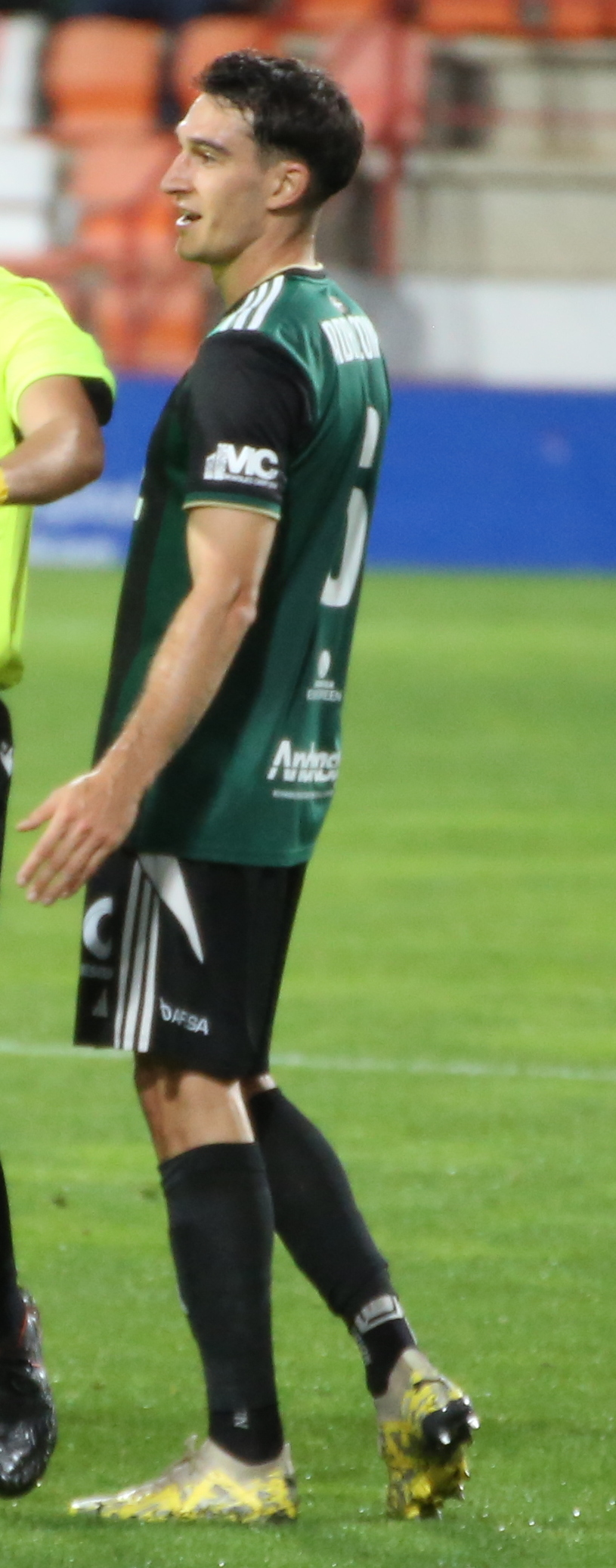
Gómez in action with Sestao River in 2024

Born in Cuenca, Castilla-La Mancha, Adri finished his formation with Valencia CF, making his senior debuts with the reserves in the 2012–13 campaign, in Segunda División B. On 2 September 2013 he moved to La Roda CF, also in the third division.

On 27 August 2014 Adri joined another reserve team, Albacete Balompié B in Tercera División. He made his first team debut on 6 September of the following year, starting in a 1–3 away loss against Real Oviedo in the Segunda División championship.

Adri scored his first professional goal on 10 January 2016, scoring the game's only in an away victory against Bilbao Athletic. He suffered relegation in the end of the season, being a regular starter from January.

On 10 November 2016 Adri renewed his contract until 2020, and was mainly used as a backup to Mickaël Gaffoor and Carlos Delgado as his side returned to the second level at first attempt.

On 24 January 2018, after being rarely used, Adri was loaned to Kazakhstani club FC Irtysh Pavlodar. Upon returning, he terminated his contract with Alba on 31 January 2019.

Adri joined Polish I liga club Podbeskidzie Bielsko-Biała on 8 February 2019 on a contract for the rest of the season.

On 14 August 2024, Gómez joined Sestao River in the third-tier Primera Federación.
