= Milan Mirosavljev =

Serbian footballer

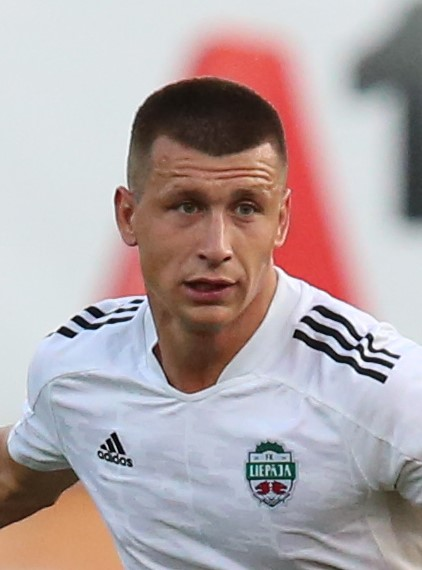

Personal information
- Date of birth: 24 April 1995 (age 31)
- Place of birth: Vrbas, FR Yugoslavia
- Height: 1.88 m (6 ft 2 in)
- Position: Forward

Team information
- Current team: FAP
- Number: 26

Youth career
- Polet Sivac
- Hajduk Kula

Senior career*
Years	Team	Apps	(Gls)
2012–2015	Hajduk Kula	8	(0)
2014	→ Dolina Padina (loan)	9	(0)
2014–2015	→ PIK Prigrevica (loan)	29	(10)
2015	Proleter Novi Sad	15	(2)
2016	Buducnost Podgorica	5	(0)
2016–2017	Proleter Novi Sad	23	(9)
2017–2018	Vojvodina	0	(0)
2017–2018	→ Proleter Novi Sad (loan)	28	(16)
2018	Proleter Novi Sad	18	(5)
2019	Irtysh Pavlodar	11	(0)
2019–2021	Proleter Novi Sad	63	(14)
2021	Liepāja	11	(2)
2022	Partizani Tirana	8	(1)
2022	Mladost Novi Sad	10	(2)
2022–2023	Železničar Pančevo	23	(5)
2024	Sutjeska	18	(4)
2024	Bukhara	12	(1)
2025	SU Dinamo Jug	15	(9)
2026–	FAP	14	(7)
- * Club domestic league appearances and goals as of 14 May 2026

Milan Mirosavljev (Serbian Cyrillic: Милан Миросављев; born 24 April 1995) is a Serbian footballer who plays as a forward for FAP.

== Career ==
=== Club ===
Mirosavljev previously played with Polet Sivac, Hajduk Kula, Dolina Padina and PIK Prigrevica.

On 3 July 2019, Mirosavljev was released by Irtysh Pavlodar.
