= Rodrigo António =

Brazilian footballer (born 1987)

Rodrigo Antônio
Personal information
- Full name: Rodrigo Antônio do Nascimento
- Date of birth: 27 July 1987 (age 39)
- Place of birth: Rio de Janeiro, Brazil
- Height: 1.79 m (5 ft 10 1/2 in)
- Position: Midfielder

Youth career
- 2006−2007: Vasco da Gama

Senior career*
| Years | Team | Apps | (Gls) |
| 2006–2008 | Vasco da Gama | 26 | (2) |
| 2007 | → Bréscia Clube (loan) | 0 | (0) |
| 2009–2013 | Marítimo | 12 | (1) |
| 2009−2013 | → Marítimo B | 33 | (3) |
| 2010 | → Ipatinga (loan) | 19 | (3) |
| 2011–2012 | → Belenenses (loan) | 30 | (8) |
| 2013−2016 | Paços de Ferreira | 21 | (0) |
| 2014−2015 | → Olhanense (loan) | 31 | (5) |
| 2016−2017 | Bnei Sakhnin | 14 | (0) |
| 2017 | Irtysh Pavlodar | 32 | (5) |
| 2018 | Irtysh Pavlodar | 14 | (1) |
| 2019–2020 | Sporting Covilhã | 16 | (1) |
| 2020–2021 | Berço | 16 | (3) |
| 2021–2023 | Prado | 45 | (3) |
- * Club domestic league appearances and goals as of 23 August 2024

Rodrigo Antônio do Nascimento (born 27 July 1987) is a former Brazilian footballer.

== Career ==
Born in Rio de Janeiro, Antônio is a youth prospect of CR Vasco da Gama, debuting for the club in 2006 in the top tier. On 29 December 2008, he made his first moved abroad, joining Marítimo in the Portuguese league. He debuted on 1 February 2009, in an away win against Associação Naval 1º de Maio.

After two seasons, which included a passage for their reserve team, Antônio returned to Brazil and signed a loan deal with Ipatinga on 28 July 2010. The following year, he moved to Belenenses on the same predicament.

On 1 July 2013, Antônio joined Paços de Ferreira, adding eleven caps in his first year, and spending his second year, loaned to Olhanense, with Ricardo Ferreira going in the opposite direction, also in a loan deal.

On 9 February 2017, Antônio signed for Irtysh Pavlodar of the Kazakhstan Premier League. After leaving Irtysh Pavlodar at the end of the 2017 season, Antônio re-signed for Irtysh Pavlodar on 24 July 2018.
