= Piraliy Aliev =

Kazakhstani footballer

Pyrali Aliyev
Personal information
- Full name: Pyrali Hanalievich Aliyev
- Date of birth: 13 January 1984 (age 42)
- Place of birth: Almaty, Kazakh SSR, Soviet Union
- Height: 1.80 m (5 ft 11 in)
- Position: Midfielder

Senior career*
Years	Team	Apps	(Gls)
2002–2004	Kairat	1	(0)
2005	Atyrau	14	(3)
2005	Temirzholshy	8	(1)
2006–2007	Astana-64	39	(1)
2008	Kairat	22	(0)
2009	Zhetysu	1	(0)
2009–2010	Atyrau	40	(3)
2011–2012	Astana	25	(1)
2012	→ Tobol (loan)	8	(0)
2013–2014	Ordabasy	27	(0)
2014–2017	Irtysh	65	(3)
2018	Atyrau	2	(0)
2018	Irtysh	0	(0)
2019	Kyzylzhar	8	(0)

International career
2004–2006	Kazakhstan U-21	10	(1)
2005–2015	Kazakhstan	5	(0)
- * Club domestic league appearances and goals

Pyrali Hanalievich Aliyev (Kazakh: Пиралы Ханәлиұлы Әлиев; born 13 January 1984) is a Kazakhstani former footballer who played as a midfielder.

== Club career ==
In December 2014, Aliyev left FC Ordabasy, signing for FC Irtysh Pavlodar later the same month.
