= 2014 FC Tobol season =

FC Tobol
2014 season
- Chairman: Nikolay Panin
- Manager: Vardan Minasyan
- Stadium: Central Stadium
- Kazakhstan Premier League: 7th
- Kazakhstan Cup: Quarter-final vs Astana
- Top goalscorer: League: Three Players (5); All: Anatoli Bogdanov (6)
Home colours	Away colours

The 2014 FC Tobol season was the 16th successive season that the club playing in the Kazakhstan Premier League, the highest tier of association football in Kazakhstan. Tobol finished the season in 7th position, whilst also reaching the Quarter-finals of the Kazakhstan Cup, where they lost to Astana.

== Squad ==
Note: Flags indicate national team as defined under FIFA eligibility rules; some limited exceptions apply. Players may hold more than one non-FIFA nationality.

No.	Pos.	Nation	Player
1	GK	KAZ	Ivan Sivozhelezov
2	DF	KAZ	Aleksandr Shkot
5	MF	KAZ	Anatoli Bogdanov
7	FW	KAZ	Alisher Suley
8	MF	SRB	Nenad Šljivić
9	MF	KAZ	Nurbol Zhumaskaliyev
10	FW	MDA	Igor Bugaiov
11	MF	RUS	Vitali Volkov
12	MF	KAZ	Ermek Nurgaliyev
13	DF	CZE	Ondřej Kušnír
14	DF	KAZ	Farkhadbek Irismetov (loan from Ordabasy)
17	DF	KAZ	Nurtas Kurgulin

No.	Pos.	Nation	Player
18	FW	KAZ	Artem Deli
20	DF	BLR	Ivan Sadownichy
21	MF	KAZ	Aleksei Malyshev
22	FW	KAZ	Beybut Abishev
23	MF	KAZ	Raul Jalilov
24	MF	SRB	Ognjen Krasić
25	DF	CZE	Štěpán Kučera
37	DF	KAZ	Rafkat Aslan
35	GK	KAZ	Aleksandr Petukhov
77	GK	TKM	Arslan Satubaldin
81	MF	AUT	Tomáš Šimkovič
99	FW	CZE	Jiří Jeslínek

== Transfers ==
=== Winter ===
In: Note: Flags indicate national team as defined under FIFA eligibility rules; some limited exceptions apply. Players may hold more than one non-FIFA nationality.

No.	Pos.	Nation	Player
3	DF	KAZ	Vladimir Pokatilov (from (Kazakhstan) Akzhayik)
13	DF	CZE	Ondřej Kušnír (from (Czech Republic) Slovan Liberec)
25	DF	CZE	Štěpán Kučera (from (Kazakhstan) Irtysh)
81	MF	AUT	Tomáš Šimkovič (from Austria Wien)
87	FW	POL	Łukasz Gikiewicz (from (Cyprus) AC Omonia)
99	FW	CZE	Jiří Jeslínek (from (Czech Republic) Mladá Boleslav)

Out: Note: Flags indicate national team as defined under FIFA eligibility rules; some limited exceptions apply. Players may hold more than one non-FIFA nationality.

No.	Pos.	Nation	Player
1	GK	KAZ	Almat Bekbaev (to (Kazakhstan) Aktobe)
4	DF	BRA	Jhonnes
7	FW	MKD	Mensur Kurtiši (to (North Macedonia) Shkëndija)
14	MF	ETH	Yussuf Saleh (to (Sweden) Syrianska)
16	FW	RUS	Aleksandr Alumona (to (Belarus) Belshina Bobruisk)
18	DF	KAZ	Daniyar Mukanov
22	FW	KAZ	Bauyrzhan Dzholchiev (to (Kazakhstan) Astana)

=== Summer ===
In: Note: Flags indicate national team as defined under FIFA eligibility rules; some limited exceptions apply. Players may hold more than one non-FIFA nationality.

No.	Pos.	Nation	Player
1	GK	KAZ	Ivan Sivozhelezov
14	DF	KAZ	Farkhadbek Irismetov (loan from (Kazakhstan) Ordabasy)
20	DF	BLR	Ivan Sadownichy (from (Belarus) Neman Grodno)

Out: Note: Flags indicate national team as defined under FIFA eligibility rules; some limited exceptions apply. Players may hold more than one non-FIFA nationality.

No.	Pos.	Nation	Player
3	DF	KAZ	Vladimir Pokatilov
33	DF	MKD	Nikola Tonev (Banned)
87	FW	POL	Łukasz Gikiewicz (to (Cyprus) AEL Limassol)

== Competitions ==
=== Kazakhstan Premier League ===
==== First round ====
===== Results summary =====
Overall								Home						Away					
Pld	W	D	L	GF	GA	GD	Pts	W	D	L	GF	GA	GD	W	D	L	GF	GA	GD
22	6	8	8	22	29	−7	26	4	5	2	12	11	+1	2	3	6	10	18	−8

Last updated: 5 February 2015.
Source: Soccerway

===== Results =====
15 March 2014 1	Tobol	2 – 1	Spartak Semey	Kostanay
14:00 (UTC+6)	Kučera (yellow card) 71'; Bogdanov 78' (yellow card) 79'; Krasić 80'; Jeslínek (yellow card) 85'	Summary	Samchenko (yellow card) 12'; Azovskiy 68'; Kutsov (yellow card) 85'	Stadium: Central Stadium; Attendance: 3,700; Referee: Askhat Abdanbayev

22 March 2014 2	Atyrau	0 – 0	Tobol	Atyrau
16:00 (UTC+6)	Savio (yellow card) 59'	Summary	A.Malyshev (yellow card) 56'; Zhumaskaliyev (yellow card) 59'	Stadium: Munaishy Stadium; Attendance: 3,800; Referee: Aleksandr Gauzer

29 March 2014 3	Tobol	0 – 2	Zhetysu	Kostanay
15:00 (UTC+6)	Petukhov (red card) 72'; Kučera (yellow card) 77'	Summary	T.Adilkhanov (yellow card) 6'; K.Zarechny 45' (yellow card) 68'; Rodionov (yellow card) 69'; S.Schaff 74' (pen.); Kovalev (yellow card) 90+4'	Stadium: Central Stadium; Attendance: 3,000; Referee: Artyom Kuchin

6 April 2014 4	Ordabasy	3 – 0	Tobol	Shymkent
15:00 (UTC+6)	Mukhtarov (yellow card) 22'; Diakate 31' (yellow card) 65'; Ashirbekov (yellow card) 48'; Junuzović 68', 81'	Summary	Kurgulin (yellow card) 22'; Šljivić (yellow card) 85'	Stadium: Kazhimukan Munaitpasov Stadium; Attendance: 4,000; Referee: Marat Iskakov

9 April 2014 5	Tobol	1 – 1	Kaisar	Kostanay
16:00 (UTC+6)	Tonev (yellow card) 16'; R.Aslan (yellow card) 45+1'; Šimkovič 50'; Volkov (yellow card) 85'	Summary	Strukov 28'; R.Rozybakiev (yellow card) 53'; Maruško (yellow card) 69'	Stadium: Central Stadium; Attendance: 3,000; Referee: Timur Kumashev

13 April 2014 6	Astana	1 – 0	Tobol	Astana
15:00 (UTC+6)	Dzholchiev (yellow card) 30'; Kojašević 80' (pen.); Nusserbayev (yellow card) 83'	Summary	Bugaiov (yellow card) 59'; Šljivić (yellow card) 79'; Zhumaskaliyev (yellow card) 79'	Stadium: Astana Arena; Attendance: 3,000; Referee: Aleksandr Aliyev

19 April 2014 7	Tobol	2 – 2	Kairat	Kostanay
16:00 (UTC+6)	Bogdanov (yellow card) 19' (goal) 69'; Volkov (yellow card) 28'; Jeslínek (yellow card) 38'; Kučera (yellow card) 54'; Krasić 73'	Summary	Ceesay 27'; Knežević 43' (yellow card) 89'; Kislitsyn (yellow card) 45'	Stadium: Central Stadium; Attendance: 2,000; Referee: Igor Chesnokov

27 April 2014 8	Tobol	1 – 0	Taraz	Kostanay
16:00 (UTC+6)	Bogdanov 51' (yellow card) 80'; Kurgulin (yellow card) 78'; Krasić (yellow card) 90+3'	Summary	D.Evstigneev (yellow card) 39'; Shchetkin (yellow card) 58'; I.Vorotnikov (yellow card) 72'	Stadium: Central Stadium; Attendance: 2,500; Referee: Aydin Rakhimbayev

1 May 2014 9	Irtysh	0 – 3	Tobol	Pavlodar
18:00 (UTC+6)	Burzanović (yellow card) 30' (yellow-red card) 50'; A.Ayaganov (yellow card) 33'; G.Sartakov (yellow card) 65'	Summary	Zhumaskaliyev 10'; Jeslínek 29', 53'; Bogdanov (yellow card) 35'	Stadium: Central Stadium; Attendance: 4,000; Referee: Bolat Karlibayev

6 May 2014 10	Tobol	0 – 2	Aktobe	Kostanay
19:00 (UTC+6)		Summary	Danilo Neco 14'; A.Tagybergen (yellow card) 24'; Kapadze 70'	Stadium: Central Stadium; Attendance: 5,500; Referee: Askhat Abdanbayev

10 May 2014 11	Shakhter Karagandy	4 – 1	Tobol	Karagandy
17:00 (UTC+6)	Finonchenko (yellow card) 13' (goal) 84'; Konysbayev 22', 45'; Malyi (yellow card) 55'; Topcagić 74'	Summary	Šimkovič (yellow card) 34'; Bogdanov (yellow card) 72'; Kurgulin (yellow card) 78'; R.Jalilov 82'	Stadium: Shakhter Stadium; Attendance: 7,000; Referee: Viktor Antonov

18 May 2014 12	Tobol	0 – 0	Atyrau	Kostanay
17:00 (UTC+6)		Summary	Karpovich (yellow card) 72'	Stadium: Central Stadium; Attendance: 2,000; Referee: Igor Khisamutdinov

24 May 2014 13	Zhetysu	1 – 2	Tobol	Taldykorgan
17:00 (UTC+6)	K.Zotov (yellow card) 35'; S.Sariyev (yellow card) 44'; Putinčanin (yellow card) 45+2'; Goa 63'	Summary	Šimkovič 36' (yellow card) 66'; Bugaiov 52'; Volkov (yellow card) 62'; Jeslínek (yellow card) 90+1'	Stadium: Zhetysu Stadium; Attendance: 2,500; Referee: Ruslan Duzmambetov

28 May 2014 14	Tobol	2 – 1	Ordabasy	Kostanay
19:00 (UTC+6)	Jeslínek (yellow card) 29'; Bogdanov (yellow card) 40'; Šljivić (yellow card) 68'; Kurgulin (yellow card) 87'; Bugaiov 89', 90+2' (yellow card) 90+4'	Summary	Ashirbekov (yellow card) 41'; Junuzović 72'; Nurgaliev (yellow card) 87'; Mukhtarov (yellow card) 90+4'	Stadium: Central Stadium; Attendance: 4,000; Referee: Denis Tevyashov

1 June 2014 15	Kaisar	0 – 0	Tobol	Kyzylorda
19:00 (UTC+6)	Hunt (yellow card) 72'; Coulibaly (yellow card) 79'	Summary	Tonev (yellow card) 55'	Stadium: Gany Muratbayev Stadium; Attendance: 6,000; Referee: Viktor Antonov

14 June 2014 16	Tobol	1 – 1	Astana	Kostanay
16:00 (UTC+6)	Šimkovič 90' (yellow card) 90+1'	Summary	Y.Akhmetov (yellow card) 55'; Kéthévoama 60'; Shakhmetov (yellow card) 74'; Loginovskiy (yellow card) 90+1'	Stadium: Central Stadium; Attendance: 5,000; Referee: Akmmalkhan Kholmatov

22 June 2014 17	Kairat	3 – 1	Tobol	Almaty
19:00 (UTC+6)	Pliyev 5'; Smakov (yellow card) 25'; Kislitsyn (yellow card) 51'; E.Kuantayev 76'; Islamkhan 89'	Summary	Kušnír (yellow card) 25'; Volkov 51'; Irismetov (yellow card) 64'	Stadium: Central Stadium; Attendance: 7,000; Referee: Bolat Karlibayev

28 June 2014 18	Taraz	1 – 1	Tobol	Taraz
18:00 (UTC+6)	Tleshev 74'	Summary	Krasić (yellow card) 62'; Bugaiov 83'	Stadium: Central Stadium; Attendance: 1,500; Referee: Marat Iskakov

6 July 2014 19	Tobol	1 – 1	Irtysh	Kostanay
18:00 (UTC+6)	Kučera (yellow card) 14'; R.Aslan (yellow card) 21'; Kušnír 23'; Jeslínek (yellow card) 88'	Summary	Bakayev (yellow card) 14'; Mukhutdinov (yellow card) 23'; Dudchenko 59'; Chuchman (yellow card) 63'; Burzanović (yellow card) 88'; A.Totay (red card) 89'	Stadium: Central Stadium; Attendance: 4,000; Referee: Aydin Rakhimbayev

11 July 2014 20	Aktobe	3 – 1	Tobol	Aktobe
21:00 (UTC+6)	Logvinenko 43'; Antonov 58'; Zyankovich 62'; Shabalin (yellow card) 90+2'	Summary	Šimkovič 5'; Irismetov (yellow card) 35'	Stadium: Central Stadium; Attendance: 10,000; Referee: Askhat Abdanbayev

27 July 2014 21	Tobol	2 – 0	Shakhter Karagandy	Kostanay
18:00 (UTC+6)	Šimkovič 36'; R.Jalilov (yellow card) 85'; Jeslínek 90+3'	Summary	Kirov (yellow card) 83'	Stadium: Central Stadium; Attendance: 3,000; Referee: Akmalkhan Kholmatov

3 August 2014 22	Spartak Semey	2 – 1	Tobol	Semey
18:00 (UTC+6)	Jovanović 71' (pen.); S.Sagindikov (yellow card) 78'; Dyulgerov (yellow card) 83'; Genev 87'	Summary	Jeslínek 43'; Zhumaskaliyev (yellow card) 70'; A.Satubaldin (yellow card) 72'; Volkov (yellow card) 78'; Irismetov (yellow card) 82'; Kušnír (yellow card) 90+1'	Stadium: Spartak Stadium; Attendance: 4,000; Referee: Denis Izmailov

===== League table =====
Pos	Team	Pld	W	D	L	GF	GA	GD	Pts	Qualification
6	Kaisar	22	8	8	6	23	23	0	32	Qualification for the championship round
7	Zhetysu	22	7	6	9	15	18	−3	27	Qualification for the relegation round
8	Tobol	22	6	8	8	22	29	−7	26	Qualification for the relegation round
9	Irtysh Pavlodar	22	6	6	10	28	35	−7	24 (Note: ATY 0–1 IRT; IRT 0-1 ATY)	Qualification for the relegation round
10	Atyrau	22	6	6	10	19	27	−8	24	Qualification for the relegation round

Source: Soccerway (in Russian)
Rules for classification: 1st points;
Two team tiebreak: 1st overall wins; 2nd head-to-head record; 3rd goals difference; 4th goals scored; 5th away goals scored;
Multiple teams tiebreak: 1st overall wins; 2nd goals difference; 3rd goals scored; 4th away goals scored

==== Relegation Round ====
===== Results summary =====
Overall								Home						Away					
Pld	W	D	L	GF	GA	GD	Pts	W	D	L	GF	GA	GD	W	D	L	GF	GA	GD
10	4	4	2	13	6	+7	16	3	1	1	7	2	+5	1	3	1	6	4	+2

Last updated: 21 January 2015.
Source: Soccerway

===== Results =====
23 August 2014 1	Tobol	1 – 2	Atyrau	Kostanay
19:00 (UTC+6)	Zhumaskaliyev 32'; Šimkovič (yellow card) 90'	Summary	Abdulin (yellow card) 49' (goal) 67'; A.Nurybekov 59' (yellow card) 61'; Plaskonny (yellow card) 70'	Stadium: Central Stadium; Attendance: 2,500; Referee: Bagdat Abdullaev

29 August 2014 2	Spartak Semey	2 – 1	Tobol	Semey
17:30 (UTC+6)	Azovskiy 16'; Y.Nurgaliyev (yellow card) 38'; A.Avagyan (yellow card) 49'; Peev 53' (pen.)	Summary	Sadownichy (yellow card) 10' (yellow-red card) 77'; Krasić (yellow card) 19' (yellow-red card) 61'; Irismetov (yellow card) 26'; Kučera (yellow card) 33'; Bogdanov 50'	Stadium: Spartak Stadium; Attendance: 3,000; Referee: Denis Tevyashov

14 September 2014 3	Tobol	3 – 0	Taraz	Kostanay
17:00 (UTC+6)	Zhumaskaliyev 9'; Volkov (yellow card) 49'; Kušnír (yellow card) 53' (goal) 69'; Jeslínek 58'; R.Jalilov (yellow card) 90+3'	Summary	O.Nedashkovsky (yellow card) 60'	Stadium: Central Stadium; Attendance: 2,500; Referee: Igor Aleshin

20 September 2014 4	Tobol	0 – 0	Irtysh	Kostanay
16:00 (UTC+6)	R.Jalilov (yellow card) 67'	Summary	Chernyshov (yellow card) 35'; Džudović (yellow card) 60'; Mukhutdinov (yellow card) 69'; Z.Korobov (yellow card) 69' (yellow-red card) 84'	Stadium: Central Stadium; Attendance: 3,000; Referee: Bolat Karlibayev

28 September 2014 5	Zhetysu	0 – 0	Tobol	Taldykorgan
16:00 (UTC+6)	Ergashev (yellow card) 25'; S.Schaff (yellow card) 67'	Summary		Stadium: Zhetysu Stadium; Attendance: 2,000; Referee: Marat Iskakov

4 October 2014 6	Tobol	1 – 0	Spartak Semey	Kostanay
16:00 (UTC+6)	Sadownichy 18' (yellow card) 52'; Šljivić (yellow card) 35'; Volkov (yellow card) 45'; Bogdanov (yellow card) 50'	Summary		Stadium: Central Stadium; Attendance: 3,000; Referee: Artyom Kuchin

19 October 2014 7	Taraz	1 – 1	Tobol	Taraz
17:00 (UTC+6)	D.Evstigneev (yellow card) 19'; D.Bayaliev (yellow card) 38'; Shchetkin 74'	Summary	Krasić 39'; Kurgulin (yellow card) 71'	Stadium: Central Stadium; Attendance: 2,800; Referee: Igor Khisamutdinov

25 October 2014 8	Irtysh	1 – 1	Tobol	Pavlodar
15:00 (UTC+6)	K.Begalyn 65'; A.Ayaganov (yellow card) 80'	Summary	Kurgulin (yellow card) 54'; R.Jalilov 85'	Stadium: Central Stadium; Attendance: 1,300; Referee: Askhat Abdanbayev

1 November 2014 9	Tobol	2 – 0	Zhetysu	Kostanay
15:00 (UTC+6)	Šljivić (yellow card) 28'; A.Suley 31'; Zhumaskaliyev 78'	Summary	B.Shaikhov (yellow card) 86'	Stadium: Central Stadium; Attendance: 1,800; Referee: Artyom Kuchin

9 November 2014 10	Atyrau	0 – 3	Tobol	Atyrau
15:00 (UTC+6)	Trifunović (yellow card) 7'; Afanasyev (yellow card) 36'	Summary	Bogdanov (yellow card) 7' (yellow-red card) 64'; Zhumaskaliyev 20' (yellow card) 35'; Krasić 41'; R.Jalilov 90+2'	Stadium: Munaishy Stadium; Attendance: 1,500; Referee: Ruslan Duzmambetov

===== Table =====
Pos	Team	Pld	W	D	L	GF	GA	GD	Pts	Relegation
7	Tobol (Note: Tobol have had 3 point(s) deducted.)	32	10	12	10	35	35	0	26	
8	Zhetysu	32	10	8	14	21	31	−10	25	
9	Atyrau	32	10	7	15	30	43	−13	25	
10	Irtysh Pavlodar	32	9	10	13	39	44	−5	25	
11	Taraz (O)	32	9	7	16	32	45	−13	25	Qualification for the relegation play-off

Source: Soccerway (in Russian)
Rules for classification: 1st points;
Two team tiebreak: 1st overall wins; 2nd head-to-head record; 3rd goals difference; 4th goals scored; 5th away goals scored;
Multiple teams tiebreak: 1st overall wins; 2nd goals difference; 3rd goals scored; 4th away goals scored.
Team start with half number of points from first round.
(O) Play-off winners

=== Kazakhstan Cup ===
23 April 2014 First Round	Bayterek	0 – 4	Tobol	Astana
14:00 (UTC+6)	Zakirov (yellow card) 26'; Mirabzalov (yellow card) 81'; Sharifullin (yellow card) 89'	Summary	Bugaiov 30'; Bogdanov 47'; Malyshev 56'; Jalilov 79'	Stadium: Astana Arena; Referee: Rustam Omarov

14 May 2014 Second Round	Tobol	1 – 0	Kyran	Kostanay
18:00 (UTC+6)	Bogdanov 90'	Summary	V.Aleksandrov (yellow card) 59'	Stadium: Central Stadium; Attendance: 1,000; Referee: Bakhyt Kyzylbaev

18 June 2014 Quarter-final	Astana	4 – 0	Tobol	Astana
19:00 (UTC+6)	Kojašević 45', 47'; Cícero 76'; Shomko (yellow card) 81'; Kéthévoama 87'	Summary	Tonev (yellow card) 44'	Stadium: Astana Arena; Attendance: 2,000; Referee: Alexander Gauzer

== Squad statistics ==
As of Match played 9 November 2014

=== Appearances and goals ===
No.	Pos	Nat	Player	Total		Premier League		Kazakhstan Cup	
No.	Pos	Nat	Player	Apps	Goals	Apps	Goals	Apps	Goals
2	DF	(Kazakhstan) KAZ	Aleksandr Shkot	2	0	0	0	2	0
5	MF	(Kazakhstan) KAZ	Anatoli Bogdanov	29	6	26	4	3	2
7	FW	(Kazakhstan) KAZ	Alisher Suley	21	1	4+15	1	1+1	0
8	MF	(Serbia) SRB	Nenad Šljivić	22	0	18+3	0	1	0
9	MF	(Kazakhstan) KAZ	Nurbol Zhumaskaliyev	29	5	25+3	5	0+1	0
10	FW	(Moldova) MDA	Igor Bugaiov	25	5	13+9	4	3	1
11	MF	(Russia) RUS	Vitali Volkov	32	1	27+2	1	2+1	0
12	MF	(Kazakhstan) KAZ	Ermek Nurgaliyev	3	0	0+1	0	2	0
13	DF	(Czech Republic) CZE	Ondřej Kušnír	18	2	12+4	2	2	0
14	DF	(Kazakhstan) KAZ	Farkhadbek Irismetov	13	0	7+6	0	0	0
17	DF	(Kazakhstan) KAZ	Nurtas Kurgulin	27	0	24+1	0	2	0
18	FW	(Kazakhstan) KAZ	Artem Deli	1	0	0	0	0+1	0
20	DF	(Belarus) BLR	Ivan Sadownichy	13	1	11+2	1	0	0
21	MF	(Kazakhstan) KAZ	Aleksei Malyshev	7	1	2+2	0	2+1	1
22	MF	(Kazakhstan) KAZ	Beybut Abishev	7	0	0+5	0	2	0
23	MF	(Kazakhstan) KAZ	Raul Jalilov	28	4	18+8	3	0+2	1
24	MF	(Serbia) SRB	Ognjen Krasić	32	4	23+7	4	1+1	0
25	DF	(Czech Republic) CZE	Štěpán Kučera	32	0	30	0	2	0
35	GK	(Kazakhstan) KAZ	Aleksandr Petukhov	28	0	28	0	0	0
37	DF	(Kazakhstan) KAZ	Rafkat Aslan	19	0	15+2	0	1+1	0
77	GK	(Turkmenistan) TKM	Arslan Satubaldin	9	0	4+2	0	3	0
81	MF	(Austria) AUT	Tomáš Šimkovič	26	5	24+2	5	0	0
99	FW	(Czech Republic) CZE	Jiří Jeslínek	28	5	16+11	5	1	0
Players who appeared for Tobol that left during the season:
33	DF	(North Macedonia) MKD	Nikola Tonev	19	0	18	0	1	0
87	FW	(Poland) POL	Lukasz Gikiewicz	14	0	7+5	0	2	0

=== Goal scorers ===
Place	Position	Nation	Number	Name	Premier League	Kazakhstan Cup	Total
1	MF	(Kazakhstan)	5	Anatoli Bogdanov	4	2	6
2	MF	(Austria)	81	Tomáš Šimkovič	5	0	5
2	MF	(Kazakhstan)	9	Nurbol Zhumaskaliyev	5	0	5
2	FW	(Czech Republic)	99	Jiří Jeslínek	5	0	5
2	FW	(Moldova)	10	Igor Bugaiov	4	1	5
6	MF	(Serbia)	24	Ognjen Krasić	4	0	4
6	MF	(Kazakhstan)	23	Raul Jalilov	3	1	4
8	DF	(Czech Republic)	13	Ondřej Kušnír	2	0	2
9	MF	(Russia)	11	Vitali Volkov	1	0	1
9	DF	(Belarus)	20	Ivan Sadownichy	1	0	1
9	FW	(Kazakhstan)	7	Alisher Suley	1	0	1
9	MF	(Kazakhstan)	21	Aleksei Malyshev	0	1	1
				TOTALS	35	5	40

=== Disciplinary record ===
Number	Nation	Position	Name	Premier League		Kazakhstan Cup		Total	
Number	Nation	Position	Name	Yellow card	Red card	Yellow card	Red card	Yellow card	Red card
5	(Kazakhstan)	MF	Anatoli Bogdanov	9	1	0	0	9	1
8	(Serbia)	MF	Nenad Šljivić	5	0	0	0	5	0
9	(Kazakhstan)	MF	Nurbol Zhumaskaliyev	4	0	0	0	4	0
10	(Moldova)	FW	Igor Bugaiov	2	0	0	0	2	0
11	(Russia)	MF	Vitali Volkov	6	0	0	0	6	0
13	(Czech Republic)	DF	Ondřej Kušnír	3	0	0	0	3	0
14	(Kazakhstan)	DF	Farkhadbek Irismetov	4	0	0	0	4	0
17	(Kazakhstan)	DF	Nurtas Kurgulin	6	0	0	0	6	0
20	(Belarus)	DF	Ivan Sadownichy	3	1	0	0	3	1
21	(Kazakhstan)	MF	Aleksei Malyshev	1	0	0	0	1	0
23	(Kazakhstan)	MF	Raul Jalilov	3	0	0	0	3	0
24	(Serbia)	MF	Ognjen Krasić	4	1	0	0	4	1
25	(Czech Republic)	DF	Štěpán Kučera	5	0	0	0	5	0
33	(North Macedonia)	DF	Nikola Tonev	2	0	1	0	3	0
35	(Kazakhstan)	GK	Aleksandr Petukhov	0	1	0	0	0	1
37	(Kazakhstan)	DF	Rafkat Aslan	2	0	0	0	2	0
77	(Turkmenistan)	GK	Arslan Satubaldin	1	0	0	0	1	0
81	(Austria)	MF	Tomáš Šimkovič	4	0	0	0	4	0
99	(Czech Republic)	FW	Jiří Jeslínek	5	0	0	0	5	0
			TOTALS	69	4	1	0	70	4
