= 2015 FC Tobol season =

FC Tobol
2015 season
- Chairman: Nikolay Panin
- Manager: Vardan Minasyan (until 16 April 2014); Sergei Kostanay (caretaker) (from 16 April 2014)
- Stadium: Central Stadium
- Kazakhstan Premier League: 7th
- Kazakhstan Cup: Semifinal
- Top goalscorer: League: Three Players (5); All: Two Players (6)
Home colours	Away colours

The 2015 FC Tobol season is the 17th successive season that the club playing in the Kazakhstan Premier League, the highest tier of association football in Kazakhstan. Tobol will also play in the Kazakhstan Cup.

Vardan Minasyan was sacked as the club's manager on 16 April 2015, with Sergei Kostanay taking over in a caretaker capacity.

== Squad ==
As of 22 April 2015

Note: Flags indicate national team as defined under FIFA eligibility rules; some limited exceptions apply. Players may hold more than one non-FIFA nationality.

No.	Pos.	Nation	Player
1	GK	KAZ	Kirill Korotkevich
2	DF	KAZ	Rafkat Aslan
5	MF	KAZ	Anatoli Bogdanov
7	MF	KAZ	Artem Deli
8	MF	SRB	Nenad Šljivić
9	MF	KAZ	Nurbol Zhumaskaliyev
10	FW	MDA	Igor Bugaev
11	MF	SRB	Ognjen Krasić
12	DF	KAZ	Ermek Nurgaliyev
13	DF	KAZ	Islam Shadukaev
14	MF	KAZ	Igor Yurin
15	FW	NGR	Uche Kalu

No.	Pos.	Nation	Player
17	DF	KAZ	Oleg Nedashkovsky
19	DF	KAZ	Nurtas Kurgulin
20	DF	BLR	Ivan Sadownichy
23	DF	UKR	Serhiy Yavorskyi
24	DF	LTU	Arūnas Klimavičius
28	DF	KAZ	Anuar Agaysin
35	GK	KAZ	Aleksandr Petukhov
77	GK	TKM	Arslan Satubaldin
78	FW	BLR	Ihar Zyankovich
81	MF	AUT	Tomáš Šimkovič
99	FW	LTU	Deivydas Matulevičius

=== Reserve team ===
Note: Flags indicate national team as defined under FIFA eligibility rules; some limited exceptions apply. Players may hold more than one non-FIFA nationality.

No.	Pos.	Nation	Player
26	DF	KAZ	Bulat Aulabaev
27	DF	KAZ	Amir Amirkhanov
29	DF	KAZ	Aset Doskaliyev
30	GK	KAZ	Sultan Busurmanov
32	MF	KAZ	Olzhas Ilyasov
34	MF	KAZ	Kazhigelad Khamzin
36	DF	KAZ	Ruslan Sultanov
38	MF	KAZ	Temirlan Aubakirov
41	FW	KAZ	Eugene Kaptelov

No.	Pos.	Nation	Player
43	MF	KAZ	Adilbek Seilov
44	DF	KAZ	Shaken Nurgeldy
47	MF	KAZ	Yerlan Beisembayev
48	MF	KAZ	Ramiz Mukanov
50	FW	KAZ	Temirlan Elmurzayev
51	FW	KAZ	Temirlan Amirgazy
53	GK	KAZ	Rasul Berdyguzhinov
53	FW	KAZ	Dmitry Zagvostkin
70	MF	KAZ	Timur Zhakupov

== Transfers ==
=== Winter ===
In: Note: Flags indicate national team as defined under FIFA eligibility rules; some limited exceptions apply. Players may hold more than one non-FIFA nationality.

No.	Pos.	Nation	Player
1	GK	KAZ	Kirill Korotkevich (from (Kazakhstan) Kaisar)
6	MF	ARM	Karlen Mkrtchyan (from (Ukraine) Metalurh Donetsk)
14	MF	KAZ	Igor Yurin (from (Kazakhstan) Irtysh)
15	FW	NGR	Uche Kalu (from (Turkey) Çaykur Rizespor)
16	DF	EST	Sergei Mošnikov (from (Estonia) Flora)
17	DF	KAZ	Oleg Nedashkovsky (from (Kazakhstan) Taraz)
24	DF	LTU	Arūnas Klimavičius (from (Kazakhstan) Zhetysu)

Out: Note: Flags indicate national team as defined under FIFA eligibility rules; some limited exceptions apply. Players may hold more than one non-FIFA nationality.

No.	Pos.	Nation	Player
1	GK	KAZ	Ivan Sivozhelezov (to (Kyrgyzstan) Alga)
2	DF	KAZ	Aleksandr Shkot
7	FW	KAZ	Alisher Suley (to (Kazakhstan) Irtysh)
11	MF	RUS	Vitali Volkov (to (Kazakhstan) Okzhetpes)
13	DF	CZE	Ondřej Kušnír (to (Czech Republic) Sigma Olomouc)
14	DF	KAZ	Farkhadbek Irismetov (loan return to (Kazakhstan) Ordabasy)
21	MF	KAZ	Aleksei Malyshev
22	FW	KAZ	Beybut Abishev
23	MF	KAZ	Raul Jalilov (to (Kazakhstan) FC Bolat)
99	FW	CZE	Jiří Jeslínek (to (Slovenia) Celje)

=== Summer ===
In: Note: Flags indicate national team as defined under FIFA eligibility rules; some limited exceptions apply. Players may hold more than one non-FIFA nationality.

No.	Pos.	Nation	Player
23	DF	UKR	Serhiy Yavorskyi (from (Ukraine) Illichivets Mariupol)
78	FW	BLR	Ihar Zyankovich (from (Turkey) Elazığspor)
99	FW	LTU	Deivydas Matulevičius (from (Romania) Pandurii Târgu Jiu)

Out: Note: Flags indicate national team as defined under FIFA eligibility rules; some limited exceptions apply. Players may hold more than one non-FIFA nationality.

No.	Pos.	Nation	Player
6	MF	ARM	Karlen Mkrtchyan
16	MF	EST	Sergei Mošnikov
25	DF	CZE	Stepan Kucera

== Competitions ==
=== Kazakhstan Premier League ===
==== First round ====
===== Results summary =====
Overall								Home						Away					
Pld	W	D	L	GF	GA	GD	Pts	W	D	L	GF	GA	GD	W	D	L	GF	GA	GD
22	7	4	11	22	31	−9	25	5	2	4	17	14	+3	2	2	7	5	17	−12

Last updated: 26 July 2015.
Source: Soccerway

===== Results by round =====
Round	1	2	3	4	5	6	7	8	9	10	11	12	13	14	15	16	17	18	19	20	21	22
Ground	A	A	H	A	H	A	H	A	H	A	H	H	A	H	A	H	A	H	A	H	A	H
Result	L	D	L	D	W	W	L	L	L	L	W	W	L	W	L	D	L	W	L	D	W	L
Position	12	12	12	11	8	6	8	9	10	10	9	8	8	8	8	8	9	8	9	9	8	8

Source: Soccerway
A = Away; H = Home; W = Win; D = Draw; L = Loss

===== Results =====
7 March 2015 1	Kairat	4–0	Tobol	Almaty
17:00 (UTC+6)	Pliyev (yellow card) 15' (yellow-red card) 79'; Gohou 16', 35' (pen.), 90'; Marković (yellow card) 43'; Islamkhan 56' (pen.)	Summary	Kucera (yellow card) 23'; R.Aslan (yellow card) 24'; Kurgulin (yellow card) 64'	Stadium: Central Stadium; Attendance: 7,000; Referee: Viktor Antonov

11 March 2015 2	Zhetysu	0–0	Tobol	Taldykorgan
15:00 (UTC+6)	S.Sagyndykov (yellow card) 74'	Summary	R.Aslan (yellow card) 7'; Kurgulin (yellow card) 72'	Stadium: Zhetysu Stadium; Attendance: 1,000; Referee: Timur Kumashev

15 March 2015 3	Tobol	0–2	Okzhetpes	Kostanay
15:00 (UTC+6)	Kucera (yellow card) 22'	Summary	Chertov (yellow card) 32'; Pawlaw 59'; Volkov 87'	Stadium: Central Stadium; Attendance: 2,000; Referee: Ruslan Duzmambetov

21 March 2015 4	Irtysh	1–1	Tobol	Pavlodar
15:00 (UTC+6)	G.Sartakov 2'; Gatagov (yellow card) 67'; Azuka (yellow card) 90+2'	Summary	Sadownichy (yellow card) 65'; Šimkovič (yellow card) 84'; Mošnikov 90+3'	Stadium: Central Stadium; Attendance: 2,500; Referee: Bolat Karlibayev

5 April 2015 5	Tobol	4–1	Shakhter Karagandy	Kostanay
15:00 (UTC+6)	Kurgulin (yellow card) 53'; Zhumaskaliyev 62', 66', 87'; Šimkovič (yellow card) 79' (goal) 82'	Summary	Pokrivač (yellow card) 44'; G.Najarian 59'; R.Murtazayev (yellow card) 70'; David (yellow card) 71'	Stadium: Central Stadium; Attendance: 3,000; Referee: Bagdat Abdullaev

11 April 2015 6	Atyrau	1–2	Tobol	Atyrau
16:00 (UTC+6)	Arzhanov 70'; Odibe (yellow card) 74' (yellow-red card) 89'	Summary	Kalu 36'; Krasić (yellow card) 61'; Bugaiov 74' (pen.) (yellow card) 80'	Stadium: Munaishy Stadium; Attendance: 2,000; Referee: Denis Izmailov

15 April 2015 7	Tobol	0–2	Aktobe	Kostanay
18:00 (UTC+6)	Bogdanov (yellow card) 21'; Sadownichy (yellow card) 38'; Kurgulin (yellow card) 67' (yellow-red card) 71'	Summary	Korobkin (yellow card) 31'; Danilo 42'; Mineiro (yellow card) 58'; Neco (yellow card) 71'; E.Levin (yellow card) 74'; Khizhnichenko 83'	Stadium: Central Stadium; Attendance: 5,000; Referee: Igor Aleshin

19 April 2015 8	Taraz	1–0	Tobol	Taraz
18:00 (UTC+6)	Mukhutdinov 55'; S.Zhumahanov (yellow card) 75'	Summary	A.Agaysin (yellow card) 77'; Šljivić (red card) 90+2'	Stadium: Central Stadium; Attendance: 5,500; Referee: Aleksandr Aliyev

25 April 2015 9	Tobol	1–3	Ordabasy	Kostanay
16:00 (UTC+6)	Bugaiov 31'; I.Yurin (yellow card) 55'; Krasić (yellow card) 68'	Summary	Geynrikh 1'; Simčević 19'; Božić 38' (yellow card) 38'	Stadium: Central Stadium; Attendance: 3,000; Referee: Akmalkhan Kholmatov

3 May 2015 10	Astana	4–0	Tobol	Astana
17:00 (UTC+6)	Shomko 28'; Nusserbayev 31'; Kéthévoama 58'; Dzholchiev 66'; Beisebekov (yellow card) 75'	Summary	Sadownichy (yellow card) 13'; Bugaev (yellow card) 85'	Stadium: Astana Arena; Attendance: 4,000

7 May 2015 11	Tobol	1–0	Kaisar	Kostanay
17:00 (UTC+6)	Sadownichy 90'	Summary	R.Rozybakiev (yellow card) 43'; Junuzovic (yellow card) 44'	Stadium: Central Stadium; Attendance: 2,500; Referee: Aydin Rakhimbayev

16 May 2015 12	Tobol	3–1	Zhetysu	Kostanay
18:00 (UTC+6)	Kalu 37', 43', 71'	Summary	Savić 65'; S.Sagyndykov (yellow card) 69'	Stadium: Central Stadium; Attendance: 1,500; Referee: Marat Iskakov

24 May 2015 13	Okzhetpes	1–0	Tobol	Kokshetau
16:00 (UTC+6)	I.Mangutkin (red card) 11'; Pawlaw (yellow card) 23'; Rotkovic 90+1' (pen.)	Summary	Sadownichy (yellow card) 8'; I.Yurin (yellow card) 15'; Bogdanov (yellow card) 26'; T.Elmurzayev (yellow card) 36'; O.Nedashkovsky (yellow card) 42'; Šimkovič (yellow card) 68'; Kurgulin (yellow card) 90+2'	Stadium: Okzhetpes Stadium; Attendance: 1,200; Referee: Artyom Kuchin

29 May 2015 14	Tobol	1–0	Irtysh	Kostanay
18:00 (UTC+6)	Kalu 29' (pen.); I.Yurin (yellow card) 31'; R.Aslan (yellow card) 47'	Summary	Loria (yellow card) 28'; Aliev (red card) 31'; Gatagov (yellow card) 36'	Stadium: Central Stadium; Attendance: 4,500; Referee: Daniyar Sakhi

6 June 2015 15	Shakhter Karagandy	1–0	Tobol	Karaganda
18:00 (UTC+6)	Topčagić (yellow card) 12'; David (yellow card) 38'; Đidić (yellow card) 73'; K.Ermekov 90+4'	Summary	Klimavičius (yellow card) 12'; Krasić (yellow card) 73'	Stadium: Shakhter Stadium; Attendance: 2,500; Referee: Viktor Antonov

20 June 2015 16	Tobol	2–2	Atyrau	Kostanay
18:00 (UTC+6)	Klimavičius (yellow card) 9'; Sadownichy 49'; Yavorskyi 58'; Bugaiov (yellow card) 88'	Summary	Parkhachev (yellow card) 4'; Essame (yellow card) 31'; V.Kuzmin (yellow card) 35'; Grigoryev 36'; K.Zarechny 72'	Stadium: Central Stadium; Attendance: 2,000; Referee: Timur Kumashev

24 June 2015 17	Aktobe	2–1	Tobol	Aktobe
19:30 (UTC+6)	D.Miroshnichenko (yellow card) 60'; Pizzelli 77'; Neco 79'; Dmitrenko (yellow card) 90'; D.Zhalmukan (yellow card) 90+1'	Summary	I.Yurin 6'; Klimavičius (yellow card) 38'	Stadium: Central Stadium; Attendance: 3,000; Referee: Bagdat Abdullaev

28 June 2015 18	Tobol	3–0	Taraz	Kostanay
18:00 (UTC+6)	I.Yurin 11', 40'; Zyankovich 21'; A.Agaysin (yellow card) 33'; Matulevičius (yellow card) 45+1'	Summary	Z.Kozhamberdy (red card) 77'	Stadium: Central Stadium; Attendance: 3,000; Referee: Igor Aleshin

5 July 2015 19	Ordabasy	2–0	Tobol	Shymkent
19:00 (UTC+6)	Trajković (yellow card) 18'; Malyi 45+2'; Petrov (yellow card) 60'; Nurgaliev 67'; E.Tungyshbaev (yellow card) 89'	Summary	Šimkovič (yellow card) 33'; O.Nedashkovsky (yellow card) 62'	Stadium: Kazhimukan Munaitpasov Stadium; Attendance: 2,500; Referee: Aleksandr Aliyev

10 July 2015 20	Tobol	1–1	Astana	Kostanay
19:00 (UTC+6)	Bugaev 12'; Zyankovich (yellow card) 38'; Sadownichy (yellow card) 45+1'; I.Yurin (yellow card) 51'; Kalu (yellow card) 65'; Bogdanov (yellow card) 85'; O.Nedashkovsky (yellow card) 90+3'	Summary	Kéthévoama 17'; Postnikov (yellow card) 28'; Zhukov (yellow card) 79'	Stadium: Central Stadium; Attendance: 3,000; Referee: Igor Chesnokov

18 July 2015 21	Kaisar	0–1	Tobol	Kyzylorda
19:00 (UTC+6)	Irismetov (yellow card) 6'; Strukov (yellow card) 90+1'	Summary	Zhumaskaliyev 9' (yellow card) 14'; Bogdanov (yellow card) 44'; Matulevičius (yellow card) 90+1'; A.Agaysin (yellow card) 90+3'	Stadium: Gany Muratbayev Stadium; Attendance: 1,500; Referee: Sergey Gorokhovodatskiy

26 July 2015 22	Tobol	1–3	Kairat	Kostanay
19:00 (UTC+6)	Yavorskyi (yellow card) 42'; Zhumaskaliyev 73'	Summary	Despotović 20', 48'; A.Darabayev 58'	Stadium: Central Stadium; Attendance: 3,500; Referee: Bolat Karlibayev

===== League table =====
Pos	Team	Pld	W	D	L	GF	GA	GD	Pts	Qualification
6	Irtysh Pavlodar	22	7	9	6	26	23	+3	30	Qualification for the championship round
7	Okzhetpes	22	8	2	12	24	33	−9	26	Qualification for the relegation round
8	Tobol	22	7	4	11	22	32	−10	25	Qualification for the relegation round
9	Taraz	22	7	3	12	17	25	−8	24	Qualification for the relegation round
10	Shakhter Karagandy	22	5	3	14	16	38	−22	18	Qualification for the relegation round

Source: UEFA.com, Soccerway
Rules for classification: 1) Points; 2) Matches won; 3) Head-to-head points; 4) Head-to-head matches won; 5) Head-to-head goal difference; 6) Head-to-head goals scored; 7) Head-to-head away goals scored; 8) Goal difference; 9) Goals scored; 10) Away goals scored; 11) Draw.

==== Relegation round ====
===== Results summary =====
Overall								Home						Away					
Pld	W	D	L	GF	GA	GD	Pts	W	D	L	GF	GA	GD	W	D	L	GF	GA	GD
10	5	2	3	10	10	0	17	2	2	1	4	4	0	3	0	2	6	6	0

Last updated: 2 November 2015.
Source: Soccerway

===== Results by round =====
Round	1	2	3	4	5	6	7	8	9	10
Ground	H	H	A	H	A	A	H	A	A	
Result	L	W	W	D	W	W	D	L	W	L
Position	9	8	7	8	7	7	7	7	7	7

Source: Soccerway
A = Away; H = Home; W = Win; D = Draw; L = Loss

===== Results =====
16 August 2015 23	Tobol	1–3	Zhetysu	Kostanay
19:00 (UTC+6)	Zyankovich 15' (pen.); Kurgulin (yellow card) 23'; Klimavičius (yellow card) 35'	Summary	Galiakberov 3', 72'; Turysbek 17'	Stadium: Central Stadium; Attendance: 3,000; Referee: Viktor Antonov

23 August 2015 24	Tobol	2–1	Shakhter Karagandy	Kostanay
17:00 (UTC+6)	Šimkovič 47', 58' (yellow card) 88'	Summary	Dimov 21'; Paryvayew (yellow card) 51'; Vasiljević (yellow card) 88'	Stadium: Central Stadium; Attendance: 2,500; Referee: Aydin Rakhimbayev

13 September 2015 25	Kaisar	1–2	Tobol	Kyzylorda
17:00 (UTC+6)	Knežević 21' (yellow card) 90'; A.Baltaev (yellow card) 74'	Summary	Krasić 12'; Kurgulin (yellow card) 25'; Zyankovich 38'	Stadium: Gani Muratbayev Stadium; Attendance: 2,200; Referee: Artyom Kuchin

19 September 2015 26	Tobol	0–0	Taraz	Kostanay
17:00 (UTC+6)	Šimkovič (yellow card) 43'	Summary	Averchenko (yellow card) 40'; D.Vasiljev (yellow card) 49'; D.Evstigneev (yellow card) 55'	Stadium: Central Stadium; Attendance: 1,000; Referee: Sergey Gorokhovodatskiy

27 September 2015 27	Okzhetpes	1–2	Tobol	Kokshetau
17:00 (UTC+6)	M.Tuliyev 22'; Gridin (yellow card) 40'; Buleshev (yellow card) 90+2'	Summary	O.Nedashkovsky (yellow card) 29'; Šimkovič 44', 56'; Bogdanov (yellow card) 82'	Stadium: Okzhetpes Stadium; Attendance: 3,200; Referee: Aleksandr Aliyev

3 October 2015 28	Shakhter Karagandy	1–2	Tobol	Karaganda
17:00 (UTC+6)	E.Kostrub (yellow card) 71'; Muldarov 80'	Summary	Šimkovič (yellow card) 48'; Zhumaskaliyev (yellow card) 53'; Zyankovich 61'; Bogdanov 75'	Stadium: Shakhter Stadium; Attendance: 1,200; Referee: Aydin Rakhimbayev

18 October 2015 29	Tobol	0–0	Kaisar	Kostanay
17:00 (UTC+6)	Šljivić (yellow card) 55'	Summary	R.Rozybakiev (yellow card) 61'	Stadium: Central Stadium; Attendance: 1,000; Referee: Ruslan Duzmambetov

24 October 2015 30	Taraz	1–0	Tobol	Taraz
17:00 (UTC+6)	Mera (yellow card) 57'; D.Evstigneev (yellow card) 64'; Pyschur 90+2'	Summary	T.Elmurzayev (yellow card) 31'; O.Nedashkovsky (yellow card) 78'	Stadium: Central Stadium; Attendance: 1,000; Referee: Furkat Atajanow

31 October 2015 31	Tobol	1–0	Okzhetpes	Kostanay
15:00 (UTC+6)	I.Yurin 22'; Šimkovič (yellow card) 52'; Šljivić (yellow card) 85'	Summary	A.Kuksin (yellow card) 31'; Chyzhov (yellow card) 45'; Chertov (yellow card) 56'; Pawlaw (yellow card) 64'; M.Tuliyev (yellow card) 90'	Stadium: Central Stadium; Attendance: 2,000; Referee: Bolat Saryev

8 November 2015 32	Zhetysu	2–0	Tobol	Taldykorgan
15:00 (UTC+6)	Turysbek (yellow card) 40'; Savić 57', 59'; S.Sariyev (yellow card) 89'	Summary	R.Aslan (yellow card) 7'; O.Nedashkovsky (yellow card) 17'	Stadium: Zhetysu Stadium; Attendance: 1,000; Referee: Aleksandr Gauzer

===== League table =====
Pos	Team	Pld	W	D	L	GF	GA	GD	Pts	Relegation
7	Tobol	32	12	6	14	32	42	−10	30	
8	Okzhetpes	32	12	6	14	36	41	−5	29	
9	Taraz	32	10	8	14	25	33	−8	26	
10	Shakhter Karagandy	32	9	5	18	27	47	−20	23	
11	Zhetysu (O)	32	8	6	18	28	46	−18	22	Qualification for the relegation play-off
12	Kaisar (R)	32	4	12	16	20	36	−16	16	Relegation to the Kazakhstan First Division

Source: Soccerway
Rules for classification: 1) Points; 2) Matches won; 3) Head-to-head points; 4) Head-to-head matches won; 5) Head-to-head goal difference; 6) Head-to-head goals scored; 7) Head-to-head away goals scored; 8) Goal difference; 9) Goals scored; 10) Away goals scored; 11) Draw.
(O) Play-off winners; (R) Relegated

=== Kazakhstan Cup ===
29 April 2015 Second round	Tobol	2–1	CSKA Almaty	Kostanay
18:00 (UTC+6)	K.Korotkevich (yellow card) 9'; T.Elmurzayev 44'; Bugaev 62'; Šimkovič (yellow card) 83'	Summary	Orazaev 10' (pen.); Izatov (yellow card) 12'; Kavakidi (yellow card) 73'; Andreev (yellow card) 83'; Shvydko (yellow card) 88'	Stadium: Central Stadium; Attendance: 1,500; Referee: Bolat Sariyev

20 May 2015 Quarterfinal	Tobol	2–0	Zhetysu	Kostanay
18:00 (UTC+6)	Šimkovič 6'; A.Deli 83'	Summary	Savić (yellow card) 35'; S.Sagyndykov (yellow card) 74'	Stadium: Central Stadium; Attendance: 2,000; Referee: Askhat Abdanbayev

2 June 2015 Semifinal 1st leg	Tobol	0–3	Kairat	Kostanay
20:00 (UTC+6)	Sadownichy (yellow card) 45'	Summary	Gohou 18'; Marković (yellow card) 31'; T.Rudoselskiy (yellow card) 47'; Islamkhan 59'; Isael 76'	Stadium: Central Stadium; Attendance: 4,000; Referee: Marat Iskakov

23 September 2015 Semifinal 2nd leg	Kairat	2–1 (5–1 agg.)	Tobol	Almaty
20:00 (UTC+6)	Riera 8'; Gorman 19'	Summary	Kurgulin (yellow card) 75'; Zhumaskaliyev 89'	Stadium: Central Stadium; Attendance: 7,000; Referee: Denis Tevyashov

== Squad statistics ==
As of Match played 8 November 2015

=== Appearances and goals ===
No.	Pos	Nat	Player	Total		Premier League		Kazakhstan Cup	
No.	Pos	Nat	Player	Apps	Goals	Apps	Goals	Apps	Goals
1	GK	(Kazakhstan) KAZ	Kirill Korotkevich	1	0	0	0	1	0
2	DF	(Kazakhstan) KAZ	Rafkat Aslan	19	0	12+4	0	2+1	0
5	MF	(Kazakhstan) KAZ	Anatoli Bogdanov	31	1	27	1	4	0
7	FW	(Kazakhstan) KAZ	Artem Deli	17	1	7+6	0	2+2	1
8	MF	(Serbia) SRB	Nenad Šljivić	25	0	17+4	0	4	0
9	MF	(Kazakhstan) KAZ	Nurbol Zhumaskaliyev	20	6	17+2	5	0+1	1
10	FW	(Moldova) MDA	Igor Bugaiov	24	3	14+8	3	1+1	0
11	MF	(Serbia) SRB	Ognjen Krasić	27	1	19+6	1	2	0
12	MF	(Kazakhstan) KAZ	Ermek Nurgaliyev	10	0	1+6	0	1+2	0
13	DF	(Kazakhstan) KAZ	Islam Shadukayev	1	0	0+1	0	0	0
14	MF	(Kazakhstan) KAZ	Igor Yurin	32	4	20+8	4	4	0
15	FW	(Nigeria) NGR	Uche Kalu	24	5	10+12	5	2	0
17	DF	(Kazakhstan) KAZ	Oleg Nedashkovsky	22	0	17+2	0	3	0
19	DF	(Kazakhstan) KAZ	Nurtas Kurgulin	23	0	17+4	0	2	0
20	DF	(Belarus) BLR	Ivan Sadownichy	30	2	27+1	2	2	0
23	DF	(Ukraine) UKR	Serhiy Yavorskyi	17	1	16	1	1	0
24	DF	(Lithuania) LTU	Arūnas Klimavičius	25	0	20+1	0	4	0
28	MF	(Kazakhstan) KAZ	Anuar Agaysin	21	0	18+2	0	1	0
30	GK	(Kazakhstan) KAZ	Sultan Busurmanov	4	0	3	0	1	0
35	GK	(Kazakhstan) KAZ	Aleksandr Petukhov	31	0	29	0	2	0
48	MF	(Kazakhstan) KAZ	Ramiz Mukanov	2	0	0+1	0	0+1	0
50	FW	(Kazakhstan) KAZ	Temirlan Elmurzayev	12	0	4+6	0	2	0
70	MF	(Kazakhstan) KAZ	Timur Zhakupov	2	0	0+1	0	0+1	0
78	FW	(Belarus) BLR	Ihar Zyankovich	16	4	13+2	4	0+1	0
80	FW	(Kazakhstan) KAZ	Yevgeniy Kaptel	1	0	0+1	0	0	0
81	MF	(Austria) AUT	Tomáš Šimkovič	31	6	24+3	5	3+1	1
99	FW	(Lithuania) LTU	Deivydas Matulevičius	14	0	10+3	0	1	0
	DF	(Kazakhstan) KAZ	Bolat Aulabaev	1	0	0+1	0	0	0
Players away from Tobol on loan:
Players who appeared for Tobol that left during the season:
6	MF	(Armenia) ARM	Karlen Mkrtchyan	4	0	2+2	0	0	0
16	MF	(Estonia) EST	Sergei Mošnikov	5	1	2+3	1	0	0
25	DF	(Czech Republic) CZE	Stepan Kucera	5	0	5	0	0	0

=== Goal scorers ===
Place	Position	Nation	Number	Name	Premier League	Kazakhstan Cup	Total
1	MF	(Kazakhstan)	9	Nurbol Zhumaskaliyev	5	1	6
1	MF	(Austria)	81	Tomáš Šimkovič	5	1	6
3	FW	(Nigeria)	15	Uche Kalu	5	0	5
4	FW	(Belarus)	78	Ihar Zyankovich	4	0	4
4	MF	(Kazakhstan)	14	Igor Yurin	4	0	4
6	FW	(Moldova)	10	Igor Bugaiov	2	0	2
6	DF	(Belarus)	20	Ivan Sadownichy	2	0	2
7	MF	(Estonia)	16	Sergei Mošnikov	1	0	1
7	DF	(Ukraine)	23	Serhiy Yavorskyi	1	0	1
7	MF	(Serbia)	11	Ognjen Krasić	1	0	1
7	MF	(Kazakhstan)	5	Anatoli Bogdanov	1	0	1
7	FW	(Kazakhstan)	7	Artem Deli	0	1	1
				TOTALS	30	3	33

=== Disciplinary record ===
Number	Nation	Position	Name	Premier League		Kazakhstan Cup		Total	
Number	Nation	Position	Name	Yellow card	Red card	Yellow card	Red card	Yellow card	Red card
1	(Kazakhstan)	GK	Kirill Korotkevich	0	0	1	0	1	0
2	(Kazakhstan)	DF	Rafkat Aslan	4	0	0	0	4	0
5	(Kazakhstan)	MF	Anatoli Bogdanov	5	0	0	0	5	0
8	(Serbia)	MF	Nenad Šljivić	2	1	0	0	2	1
9	(Kazakhstan)	FW	Nurbol Zhumaskaliyev	2	0	0	0	2	0
10	(Moldova)	FW	Igor Bugaiov	3	0	0	0	3	0
11	(Serbia)	MF	Ognjen Krasić	3	0	0	0	3	0
14	(Kazakhstan)	MF	Igor Yurin	4	0	0	0	4	0
15	(Nigeria)	FW	Uche Kalu	1	0	0	0	1	0
17	(Kazakhstan)	DF	Oleg Nedashkovsky	6	0	0	0	6	0
19	(Kazakhstan)	DF	Nurtas Kurgulin	9	1	0	0	9	1
20	(Belarus)	DF	Ivan Sadownichy	5	0	1	0	6	0
23	(Ukraine)	DF	Serhiy Yavorskyi	1	0	0	0	1	0
24	(Lithuania)	DF	Arūnas Klimavičius	4	0	0	0	4	0
25	(Czech Republic)	DF	Stepan Kucera	2	0	0	0	2	0
28	(Kazakhstan)	MF	Anuar Agaysin	3	0	0	0	3	0
50	(Kazakhstan)	FW	Temirlan Elmurzayev	2	0	0	0	2	0
78	(Belarus)	FW	Ihar Zyankovich	1	0	0	0	1	0
81	(Austria)	MF	Tomáš Šimkovič	8	0	1	0	9	0
99	(Lithuania)	FW	Deivydas Matulevičius	2	0	0	0	2	0
			TOTALS	67	2	4	0	71	2
