= 2015 FC Okzhetpes season =

FC Okzhetpes
2015 season
- Chairman: Saparbek Kakishev
- Manager: Vladimir Cheburin
- Stadium: Okzhetpes Stadium
- Kazakhstan Premier League: 8th
- Kazakhstan Cup: Quarter-final (eliminated by Aktobe)
- Top goalscorer: League: Luka Rotković (13); All: Luka Rotković (15)
Home colours

The 2015 FC Okzhetpes season is the club's first season back in the Kazakhstan Premier League, the highest tier of association football in Kazakhstan, and 19th in total. Okzhetpes will also take part in the Kazakhstan Cup.

== Squad ==
As of 18 March 2015

Note: Flags indicate national team as defined under FIFA eligibility rules; some limited exceptions apply. Players may hold more than one non-FIFA nationality.

No.	Pos.	Nation	Player
1	GK	KAZ	Yaroslav Baginskiy
3	DF	KAZ	Yegor Azovskiy
5	DF	KAZ	Kirill Pasichnik
6	DF	KAZ	Ilnur Mangutkin
7	MF	KAZ	Ruslan Sakhalbayev
8	MF	KAZ	Yerkin Nurzhanov
9	MF	KAZ	Nikita Khokhlov
10	FW	KAZ	Alibek Buleshev
11	MF	RUS	Vitali Volkov
14	DF	KAZ	Viktor Kryukov
15	DF	KAZ	Anton Kuksin
17	MF	BLR	Alyaksandr Pawlaw
18	MF	KAZ	Ruslan Kenetayev

No.	Pos.	Nation	Player
19	MF	KAZ	Daniyar Nukebay
20	GK	KAZ	Anton Tsirin
22	DF	CZE	Michal Smejkal (loan from Mladá Boleslav)
23	DF	KAZ	Miras Tuliyev
24	DF	KAZ	Aleksandr Marochkin
25	GK	KAZ	Ruslan Abzhanov
26	FW	RUS	Dmitri Sychev (loan from Lokomotiv Moscow)
27	MF	KAZ	Pavel Shabalin
28	FW	KAZ	Sergey Gridin
29	MF	SRB	Ivan Cvetković
45	FW	MNE	Luka Rotković
77	DF	UKR	Oleksandr Chyzhov
88	DF	RUS	Daniil Chertov

== Transfers ==
=== Winter ===
In: Note: Flags indicate national team as defined under FIFA eligibility rules; some limited exceptions apply. Players may hold more than one non-FIFA nationality.

No.	Pos.	Nation	Player
5	DF	KAZ	Kirill Pasichnik (from (Kazakhstan) Atyrau)
7	MF	KAZ	Ruslan Sakhalbayev (from (Kazakhstan) Spartak Semey)
11	MF	RUS	Vitali Volkov (from (Kazakhstan) Tobol)
16	DF	KAZ	Yevgeni Goryachi (from (Kazakhstan) Astana)
17	MF	BLR	Alyaksandr Pawlaw (from (Belarus) BATE Borisov)
20	GK	KAZ	Anton Tsirin (from (Kazakhstan) Atyrau)
21	MF	CAN	Joseph Di Chiara (from (Canada) Vaughan Azzurri)
22	DF	CZE	Michal Smejkal (loan from (Czech Republic) Mladá Boleslav)
26	FW	RUS	Dmitri Sychev (loan from (Russia) Lokomotiv Moscow)
45	FW	MNE	Luka Rotković (from (Montenegro) Mornar)
77	DF	UKR	Oleksandr Chyzhov (from (Ukraine) Illichivets Mariupol)
88	DF	RUS	Daniil Chertov (from (Russia) Khimki)

Out: Note: Flags indicate national team as defined under FIFA eligibility rules; some limited exceptions apply. Players may hold more than one non-FIFA nationality.

No.	Pos.	Nation	Player
—	DF	GUY	Jamaal Smith (to (Canada) Vaughan Azzurri)
—	MF	KGZ	Anatoliy Vlasichev (to (Kyrgyzstan) Alay Osh)

=== Summer ===
In: Note: Flags indicate national team as defined under FIFA eligibility rules; some limited exceptions apply. Players may hold more than one non-FIFA nationality.

No.	Pos.	Nation	Player
27	MF	KAZ	Pavel Shabalin (from (Kazakhstan) Aktobe)
28	FW	KAZ	Sergey Gridin
29	MF	SRB	Ivan Cvetković (from (Kazakhstan) Zhetysu)

Out: Note: Flags indicate national team as defined under FIFA eligibility rules; some limited exceptions apply. Players may hold more than one non-FIFA nationality.

No.	Pos.	Nation	Player
16	DF	KAZ	Yevgeni Goryachi (to (Kazakhstan) Zhetysu)
21	MF	CAN	Joseph Di Chiara

== Competitions ==
=== Kazakhstan Premier League ===
==== First round ====
===== Results summary =====
Overall								Home						Away					
Pld	W	D	L	GF	GA	GD	Pts	W	D	L	GF	GA	GD	W	D	L	GF	GA	GD
22	8	2	12	22	31	−9	26	5	1	5	11	10	+1	3	1	7	11	21	−10

Last updated: 20 July 2015.
Source: Soccerway

===== Results by round =====
Round	1	2	3	4	5	6	7	8	9	10	11	12	13	14	15	16	17	18	19	20	21	22
Ground	A	H	A	H	A	A	H	A	H	A	H	A	H	A	H	H	A	H	A	H	A	H
Result	L	W	W	W	L	L	W	L	L	D	L	W	W	W	L	L	L	D	L	W	L	L
Position	11	5	4	3	4	4	3	6	7	7	7	7	6	6	6	6	6	6	8	6	7	7

Source: Soccerway
A = Away; H = Home; W = Win; D = Draw; L = Loss

===== Results =====
7 March 2015 1	Astana	2 – 0	Okzhetpes	Astana
17:00 (UTC+6)	Cañas 37'; Twumasi 59'; Shchetkin (yellow card) 77'; Shomko (red card) 90+3'	Summary	Buleshev (yellow card) 75'; Pawlaw (yellow card) 90+2'	Stadium: Astana Arena; Attendance: 1,500; Referee: Aleksandr Aliyev

11 March 2015 2	Okzhetpes	1 – 0	Kaisar	Kokshetau
18:00 (UTC+6)	Chertov (yellow card) 59'; Rotkovic 81'	Summary	R.Rozybakiev (yellow card) 27'	Stadium: Okzhetpes Stadium; Attendance: 1,000; Referee: Artyom Kuchin

15 March 2015 3	Tobol	0 – 2	Okzhetpes	Kostanay
15:00 (UTC+6)	Kucera (yellow card) 22'	Summary	Chertov (yellow card) 32'; Pawlaw 59'; Volkov 87'	Stadium: Central Stadium; Attendance: 2,000; Referee: Ruslan Duzmambetov

21 March 2015 4	Okzhetpes	2 – 0	Zhetysu	Kokshetau
16:00 (UTC+6)	Pawlaw (yellow card) 38'; Rotkovic 69' (yellow card) 90+2'; Buleshev 75'	Summary	Savić (yellow card) 39'	Stadium: Okzhetpes Stadium; Attendance: 500; Referee: Anatolyi Vishnichenko

4 April 2015 5	Kairat	4 – 0	Okzhetpes	Almaty
17:00 (UTC+6)	Gohou 41'; Isael 45', 76'; Riera 50'; Bakayev (yellow card) 70'	Summary	Buleshev (yellow card) 70'	Stadium: Central Stadium; Attendance: 8,000; Referee: Igor Aleshin

11 April 2015 6	Irtysh	3 – 1	Okzhetpes	Pavlodar
15:00 (UTC+6)	Smakov 20'; Azuka 32'; Bancé (yellow card) 33' (goal) 51'; Kislitsyn (yellow card) 67'; I.Graf (yellow card) 78'	Summary	Volkov 6'	Stadium: Central Stadium; Attendance: 2,500; Referee: Timur Kumashev

15 April 2015 7	Okzhetpes	1 – 0	Shakhter Karagandy	Astana
14:00 (UTC+6)	Chertov (yellow card) 5'; Buleshev 33'; A.Marochkin (yellow card) 38'; Sychev (yellow card) 70'; Di Chiara (yellow card) 82'	Summary	Karpovich (yellow card) 21'; V.Vasiliev (yellow card) 50'; Paryvaew (yellow card) 74'; R.Murtazayev (yellow card) 82'; Pokrivač (yellow card) 88'	Stadium: Astana Arena; Attendance: 600; Referee: Akmalkhan Kholmatov

19 April 2015 8	Atyrau	2 – 1	Okzhetpes	Atyrau
17:00 (UTC+6)	B.Aitbayev 36'; Chichulin (yellow card) 44'; Diakate 67'	Summary	Di Chiara 63'; Chyzhov (yellow card) 66'	Stadium: Munaishy Stadium; Attendance: 3,000; Referee: Askhat Abdanbayev

25 April 2015 9	Okzhetpes	2 – 3	Aktobe	Kokshetau
14:00 (UTC+6)	Rotkovic 46'; Sychev 76'; Buleshev (yellow card) 84'	Summary	Khairullin 23'; Korobkin (yellow card) 59'; Žulpa (yellow card) 66'; Pizzelli 83'; Neco 87'; Mineiro (yellow card) 89'	Stadium: Okzhetpes Stadium; Attendance: 1,500; Referee: Bolat Karlibayev

3 May 2015 10	Taraz	1 – 1	Okzhetpes	Taraz
14:00 (UTC+6)	A.Taubay 13'; Mukhutdinov (yellow card) 37'; A.Abdenabi (yellow card) 50'	Summary	Buleshev 31'; Chertov (yellow card) 45+1'; Di Chiara (yellow card) 52'; R.Sakhalbayev (yellow card) 79'; Azovskiy (yellow card) 81'; Tsirin (yellow card) 90+3'	Stadium: Central Stadium; Attendance: 4,500; Referee: Marat Iskakov

7 May 2015 11	Okzhetpes	0 – 1	Ordabasy	Astana
15:00 (UTC+6)	Azovskiy (yellow card) 72'; Chyzhov (yellow card) 82'; M.Tuliyev (yellow card) 90+3'	Summary	Malyi (yellow card) 7'; Kasyanov (yellow card) 18'; Geynrikh 30' (yellow card) 70'; G.Suyumbaev (yellow card) 61'; Boychenko (yellow card) 90'; R.Sariev (yellow card) 90+3'	Stadium: Astana Arena; Attendance: 1,200; Referee: Igor Aleshin

16 May 2015 12	Kaisar	0 – 2	Okzhetpes	Kyzylorda
18:00 (UTC+6)	Nurdauletov (yellow card) 52'	Summary	M.Tuliyev (yellow card) 10'; I.Mangutkin 12' (yellow card) 61'; Buleshev 36'; Rotkovic (yellow card) 37'; Di Chiara (yellow card) 90+2'	Stadium: Gany Muratbayev Stadium; Attendance: 2,000; Referee: Denis Tevyashov

24 May 2015 13	Okzhetpes	1 – 0	Tobol	Kokshetau
16:00 (UTC+6)	I.Mangutkin (red card) 11'; Pawlaw (yellow card) 23'; Rotkovic 90+1' (pen.)	Summary	Sadownichy (yellow card) 8'; I.Yurin (yellow card) 15'; Bogdanov (yellow card) 26'; T.Elmurzayev (yellow card) 36'; O.Nedashkovsky (yellow card) 42'; Šimkovič (yellow card) 68'; Kurgulin (yellow card) 90+2'	Stadium: Okzhetpes Stadium; Attendance: 1,200; Referee: Artyom Kuchin

29 May 2015 14	Zhetysu	0 – 1	Okzhetpes	Taldykorgan
18:30 (UTC+6)	S.Sagyndykov (yellow card) 15'; Turysbek (yellow card) 65'; Despotović (yellow card) 70'; Savić (yellow card) 90+2'	Summary	Rotković 30'; V.Kryukov (yellow card) 39'	Stadium: Zhetysu Stadium; Attendance: 2,000; Referee: Bagdat Abdullaev

6 June 2015 15	Okzhetpes	1 – 3	Kairat	Kokshetau
16:00 (UTC+6)	Rotkovic 23'; Smejkal (yellow card) 83'	Summary	Gohou 28', 37', 65'; Riera (yellow card) 71'	Stadium: Okzhetpes Stadium; Attendance: 1,500; Referee: Askhat Abdanbayev

20 June 2015 16	Okzhetpes	0 – 1	Irtysh	Kokshetau
18:00 (UTC+6)	Khokhlov (yellow card) 29'; I.Mangutkin (yellow card) 89'	Summary	Fonseca (yellow card) 30'; N'Diaye 57'; R.Yesimov (yellow card) 82'	Stadium: Okzhetpes Stadium; Attendance: 1,500; Referee: Igor Chesnokov

24 June 2015 17	Shakhter Karagandy	3 – 0	Okzhetpes	Karaganda
18:30 (UTC+6)	Topčagić 3'; Pawlaw 19' (o.g.); R.Sakhalbayev (yellow card) 60'; Khokhlov (yellow card) 61'; S.Vetrov 83'	Summary	R.Sakhalbayev (yellow card) 59'	Stadium: Shakhter Stadium; Attendance: 2,000; Referee: Daniyar Sakhi

28 June 2015 18	Okzhetpes	2 – 2	Atyrau	Kokshetau
19:00 (UTC+6)	Pawlaw (yellow card) 51' (yellow-red card) 64'; Buleshev 53' (yellow card) 84'; Rotkovic 68'	Summary	Grigoryev 36'; Essame (yellow card) 67'; Chichulin (yellow card) 74'; Tleshev (yellow card) 88'; M.Tuliyev 90+3' (o.g.); Diakate (yellow card) 90+4'	Stadium: Okzhetpes Stadium; Attendance: 2,200; Referee: Marat Iskakov

5 July 2015 19	Aktobe	4 – 2	Okzhetpes	Aktobe
20:00 (UTC+6)	Korobkin 48'; Khizhnichenko 50', 64', 84'; Deac (yellow card) 62'; Dmitrenko (yellow card) 77'	Summary	R. Sakhalbayev 20'; Rotković 67'	Stadium: Central Stadium; Attendance: 3,000; Referee: Akmalkhan Kholmatov

11 July 2015 20	Okzhetpes	2 – 0	Taraz	Kokshetau
19:00 (UTC+6)	Volkov (yellow card) 39'; Rotkovic 41' (pen.); Gridin 85'	Summary	M.Amirkhanov (yellow card) 45+1'	Stadium: Okzhetpes Stadium; Attendance: 2,500; Referee: Aydin Rakhimbayev

19 July 2015 21	Ordabasy	2 – 1	Okzhetpes	Shymkent
18:00 (UTC+6)	E.Tungyshbaev 45'; Kasyanov 51'; Nurgaliev (yellow card) 78'; Simčević (yellow card) 84'	Summary	Pawlaw (yellow card) 41'; Rotković 53'; M.Tuliyev (yellow card) 77'; Gridin (yellow card) 81'; Chyzhov (yellow card) 85'	Stadium: Kazhimukan Munaitpasov Stadium; Attendance: 3,000; Referee: Marat Iskakov

25 July 2015 22	Okzhetpes	1 – 2	Astana	Kokshetau
19:00 (UTC+6)	Shabalin (yellow card) 44'; Buleshev 48'	Summary	Dedechko (yellow card) 46'; Kabananga 53', 54'; Muzhikov (yellow card) 82'; Akhmetov (yellow card) 86'	Stadium: Okzhetpes Stadium; Attendance: 2,500; Referee: Askhat Abdanbayev

===== League table =====
Pos	Team	Pld	W	D	L	GF	GA	GD	Pts	Qualification
5	Ordabasy	22	9	8	5	21	18	+3	35	Qualification for the championship round
6	Irtysh Pavlodar	22	7	9	6	26	23	+3	30	Qualification for the championship round
7	Okzhetpes	22	8	2	12	24	33	−9	26	Qualification for the relegation round
8	Tobol	22	7	4	11	22	32	−10	25	Qualification for the relegation round
9	Taraz	22	7	3	12	17	25	−8	24	Qualification for the relegation round

Source: UEFA.com, Soccerway
Rules for classification: 1) Points; 2) Matches won; 3) Head-to-head points; 4) Head-to-head matches won; 5) Head-to-head goal difference; 6) Head-to-head goals scored; 7) Head-to-head away goals scored; 8) Goal difference; 9) Goals scored; 10) Away goals scored; 11) Draw.

==== Relegation Round ====
===== Results summary =====
Overall								Home						Away					
Pld	W	D	L	GF	GA	GD	Pts	W	D	L	GF	GA	GD	W	D	L	GF	GA	GD
10	4	4	2	12	8	+4	16	2	2	1	5	4	+1	2	2	1	7	4	+3

Last updated: 2 November 2015.
Source: Soccerway

===== Results by round =====
Round	1	2	3	4	5	6	7	8	9	10
Ground	A	H	A	A	H	A	H	H	A	H
Result	D	W	D	W	L	W	D	D	L	W
Position	7	7	8	7	8	8	8	8	8	8

Source: Soccerway
A = Away; H = Home; W = Win; D = Draw; L = Loss

===== Results =====
15 August 2015 23	Shakhter Karagandy	0 – 0	Okzhetpes	Karaganda
19:00 (UTC+6)	E.Kostrub (yellow card) 32'	Summary	Cvetković (yellow card) 51'	Stadium: Shakhter Stadium; Attendance: 3,000; Referee: Bagdat Abdullaev

23 August 2015 24	Okzhetpes	2 – 1	Kaisar	Kokshetau
17:00 (UTC+6)	Chyzhov (yellow card) 12'; Pawlaw (yellow card) 18'; Sychev 22'; A.Kuksin (yellow card) 63'; Rotkovic 82' (yellow card) 83'	Summary	Z.Moldakaraev 14'; R.Rozybakiev (yellow card) 29'; Irismetov (yellow card) 32'; Knežević (yellow card) 49'	Stadium: Okzhetpes Stadium; Attendance: 2,000; Referee: Sergey Gorokhovodatskiy

12 September 2015 25	Taraz	3 – 3	Okzhetpes	Taraz
17:00 (UTC+6)	Mera (yellow card) 6'; D.Evstigneev (yellow card) 11'; A.Suley 30'; Dosmagambetov 53'; S.Zhumahanov 74'; Mukhutdinov (yellow card) 90+3'	Summary	Pawlaw 79'; Gridin 90'; Cvetković 90+3' (pen.)	Stadium: Central Stadium; Attendance: 3,500; Referee: Daniyar Sakhi

19 September 2015 26	Zhetysu	0 – 3	Okzhetpes	Taldykorgan
17:00 (UTC+6)	Samigullin (yellow card) 35'; Savić (yellow card) 53'	Summary	A.Kuksin (yellow card) 23'; Chyzhov (yellow card) 30'; Buleshev 40'; Rotković 76', 90+1'	Stadium: Zhetysu Stadium; Attendance: 2,000; Referee: Furkat Atajanow

27 September 2015 27	Okzhetpes	1 – 2	Tobol	Kokshetau
17:00 (UTC+6)	M.Tuliyev 22'; Gridin (yellow card) 40'; Buleshev (yellow card) 90+2'	Summary	O.Nedashkovsky (yellow card) 29'; Šimkovič 44', 56'; Bogdanov (yellow card) 82'	Stadium: Okzhetpes Stadium; Attendance: 3,200; Referee: Aleksandr Aliyev

3 October 2015 28	Kaisar	0 – 1	Okzhetpes	Kyzylorda
16:30 (UTC+6)	Klein (yellow card) 36'; Matsveenka (yellow card) 55'; Shestakov (yellow card) 75'	Summary	Shabalin 25'; Chertov (yellow card) 64'; Cvetković (yellow card) 86'; Rotković (yellow card) 90+3'	Stadium: Gani Muratbayev Stadium; Attendance: 2,000; Referee: Sergey Gorokhovodatskiy

18 October 2015 29	Okzhetpes	0 – 0	Taraz	Kokshetau
17:00 (UTC+6)	Khokhlov (yellow card) 85'	Summary	D.Bashlay (yellow card) 50'; Dosmagambetov (yellow card) 90'	Stadium: Okzhetpes Stadium; Attendance: 2,000; Referee: Aleksandr Gauzer

24 October 2015 30	Okzhetpes	1 – 1	Zhetysu	Kokshetau
14:00 (UTC+6)	Sychev 32'; A.Kuksin (yellow card) 89'	Summary	Savić 44'; Shakhmetov (yellow card) 60'	Stadium: Okzhetpes Stadium; Attendance: 1,500; Referee: Askhat Abdanbayev

31 October 2015 31	Tobol	1 – 0	Okzhetpes	Kostanay
15:00 (UTC+6)	I.Yurin 22'; Šimkovič (yellow card) 52'; Šljivić (yellow card) 85'	Summary	A.Kuksin (yellow card) 31'; Chyzhov (yellow card) 45'; Chertov (yellow card) 56'; Pawlaw (yellow card) 64'; M.Tuliyev (yellow card) 90'	Stadium: Central Stadium; Attendance: 2,000; Referee: Bolat Saryev

8 November 2015 32	Okzhetpes	1 – 0	Shakhter Karagandy	Kokshetau
15:00 (UTC+6)	Buleshev (yellow card) 6' (goal) 62'; Cvetković (red card) 19'	Summary	G.Dubkov (yellow card) 61'	Stadium: Okzhetpes Stadium; Attendance: 2,000; Referee: Igor Chesnokov

===== League table =====
Pos	Team	Pld	W	D	L	GF	GA	GD	Pts	Relegation
7	Tobol	32	12	6	14	32	42	−10	30	
8	Okzhetpes	32	12	6	14	36	41	−5	29	
9	Taraz	32	10	8	14	25	33	−8	26	
10	Shakhter Karagandy	32	9	5	18	27	47	−20	23	
11	Zhetysu (O)	32	8	6	18	28	46	−18	22	Qualification for the relegation play-off
12	Kaisar (R)	32	4	12	16	20	36	−16	16	Relegation to the Kazakhstan First Division

Source: Soccerway
Rules for classification: 1) Points; 2) Matches won; 3) Head-to-head points; 4) Head-to-head matches won; 5) Head-to-head goal difference; 6) Head-to-head goals scored; 7) Head-to-head away goals scored; 8) Goal difference; 9) Goals scored; 10) Away goals scored; 11) Draw.
(O) Play-off winners; (R) Relegated

=== Kazakhstan Cup ===
29 April 2015 Second Round	Shakhter Karagandy	1 – 2 (a.e.t.)	Okzhetpes	Karaganda
16:00 (UTC+6)	Smejkal 6' (o.g.); Paryvaew (yellow card) 17'; Pokrivač (yellow card) 40'	Report	Rotkovic 55' (yellow card) 120'; Sakhalbayev 98'	Stadium: Shakhter Stadium; Attendance: 500

20 May 2015 Quarterfinal	Okzhetpes	2 – 3	Aktobe	Kokshetau
18:00 (UTC+6)	Rotković 25' (pen.); Azovskiy 90'	Summary	Pizzelli 20'; Pokatilov (yellow card) 24'; Žulpa 41' (yellow card) 81'; Neco 45+1'; Dmitrenko (yellow card) 49'	Stadium: Okzhetpes Stadium; Attendance: 3,000; Referee: Ruslan Duzmambetov

== Squad statistics ==
As of Match played 8 November 2015

=== Appearances and goals ===
No.	Pos	Nat	Player	Total		Premier League		Kazakhstan Cup	
No.	Pos	Nat	Player	Apps	Goals	Apps	Goals	Apps	Goals
1	GK	(Kazakhstan) KAZ	Yaroslav Baginskiy	1	0	1	0	0	0
3	DF	(Kazakhstan) KAZ	Yegor Azovskiy	17	1	13+3	0	1	1
6	DF	(Kazakhstan) KAZ	Ilnur Mangutkin	19	1	13+4	1	2	0
7	MF	(Kazakhstan) KAZ	Ruslan Sakhalbayev	24	2	15+7	1	0+2	1
8	MF	(Kazakhstan) KAZ	Yerkin Nurzhanov	17	0	5+11	0	0+1	0
9	MF	(Kazakhstan) KAZ	Nikita Khokhlov	20	0	15+5	0	0	0
10	FW	(Kazakhstan) KAZ	Alibek Buleshev	30	8	27+2	8	1	0
11	MF	(Russia) RUS	Vitali Volkov	34	2	31+1	2	1+1	0
14	DF	(Kazakhstan) KAZ	Victor Kryukov	10	0	8+1	0	1	0
15	DF	(Kazakhstan) KAZ	Anton Kuksin	8	0	8	0	0	0
17	MF	(Belarus) BLR	Alyaksandr Pawlaw	30	2	24+4	2	2	0
19	MF	(Kazakhstan) KAZ	Daniyar Nukebay	6	0	0+5	0	1	0
20	GK	(Kazakhstan) KAZ	Anton Tsirin	22	0	21	0	1	0
23	DF	(Kazakhstan) KAZ	Miras Tuliyev	31	1	29+1	1	1	0
22	DF	(Czech Republic) CZE	Michal Smejkal	16	0	9+5	0	1+1	0
24	DF	(Kazakhstan) KAZ	Aleksandr Marochkin	9	0	7+2	0	0	0
25	GK	(Kazakhstan) KAZ	Ruslan Abzhanov	11	0	10	0	1	0
26	FW	(Russia) RUS	Dmitri Sychev	20	3	8+11	3	1	0
27	MF	(Kazakhstan) KAZ	Pavel Shabalin	12	1	11+1	1	0	0
28	FW	(Kazakhstan) KAZ	Sergey Gridin	13	2	9+4	2	0	0
29	MF	(Serbia) SRB	Ivan Cvetković	13	1	12+1	1	0	0
36	MF	(Kazakhstan) KAZ	Oleg Lebedev	1	0	1	0	0	0
45	FW	(Montenegro) MNE	Luka Rotković	33	15	15+16	13	2	2
77	DF	(Ukraine) UKR	Oleksandr Chyzhov	31	0	30	0	1	0
88	DF	(Russia) RUS	Daniil Chertov	29	0	24+3	0	1+1	0
	DF	(Kazakhstan) KAZ	Maxim Azov	1	0	0	0	1	0
Players away from Okzhetpes on loan:
Players who appeared for Okzhetpes that left during the season:
16	DF	(Kazakhstan) KAZ	Yevgeni Goryachi	2	0	0	0	2	0
21	MF	(Canada) CAN	Joseph Di Chiara	13	1	7+5	1	1	0

=== Goal scorers ===
Place	Position	Nation	Number	Name	Premier League	Kazakhstan Cup	Total
1	FW	(Montenegro)	45	Luka Rotković	13	2	15
2	FW	(Kazakhstan)	10	Alibek Buleshev	8	0	8
3	FW	(Russia)	26	Dmitri Sychev	3	0	3
4	MF	(Russia)	11	Vitali Volkov	2	0	2
4	FW	(Kazakhstan)	28	Sergey Gridin	2	0	2
4	MF	(Kazakhstan)	7	Ruslan Sakhalbayev	1	1	2
7	MF	(Belarus)	17	Alyaksandr Pawlaw	1	0	1
7	MF	(Canada)	21	Joseph Di Chiara	1	0	1
7	DF	(Kazakhstan)	6	Ilnur Mangutkin	1	0	1
7	MF	(Belarus)	17	Alyaksandr Pawlaw	1	0	1
7	MF	(Serbia)	29	Ivan Cvetković	1	0	1
7	DF	(Kazakhstan)	23	Miras Tuliyev	1	0	1
7	MF	(Kazakhstan)	27	Pavel Shabalin	1	0	1
7	DF	(Kazakhstan)	3	Yegor Azovskiy	0	1	1
				TOTALS	36	4	40

=== Disciplinary record ===
Number	Nation	Position	Name	Premier League		Kazakhstan Cup		Total	
Number	Nation	Position	Name	Yellow card	Red card	Yellow card	Red card	Yellow card	Red card
2	(Kazakhstan)	DF	Yegor Azovskiy	2	0	0	0	2	0
6	(Kazakhstan)	DF	Ilnur Mangutkin	2	1	0	0	2	1
7	(Kazakhstan)	MF	Ruslan Sakhalbayev	2	0	0	0	2	0
9	(Kazakhstan)	MF	Nikita Khokhlov	4	0	0	0	4	0
10	(Kazakhstan)	FW	Alibek Buleshev	5	0	0	0	5	0
11	(Russia)	MF	Vitali Volkov	1	0	0	0	1	0
14	(Kazakhstan)	DF	Victor Kryukov	1	0	0	0	1	0
15	(Kazakhstan)	DF	Anton Kuksin	4	0	0	0	4	0
17	(Belarus)	MF	Alyaksandr Pawlaw	9	1	0	0	9	1
20	(Kazakhstan)	GK	Anton Tsirin	1	0	0	0	1	0
21	(Canada)	MF	Joseph Di Chiara	2	0	0	0	2	0
22	(Czech Republic)	DF	Michal Smejkal	1	0	0	0	1	0
23	(Kazakhstan)	DF	Miras Tuliyev	4	0	0	0	4	0
24	(Kazakhstan)	DF	Aleksandr Marochkin	1	0	0	0	1	0
26	(Russia)	FW	Dmitri Sychev	1	0	0	0	1	0
27	(Kazakhstan)	MF	Pavel Shabalin	1	0	0	0	1	0
28	(Kazakhstan)	FW	Sergey Gridin	2	0	0	0	2	0
29	(Serbia)	MF	Ivan Cvetković	2	1	0	0	2	1
45	(Montenegro)	FW	Luka Rotković	4	0	1	0	5	0
77	(Ukraine)	DF	Oleksandr Chyzhov	6	0	0	0	6	0
88	(Russia)	DF	Daniil Chertov	6	0	0	0	6	0
			TOTALS	61	3	1	0	62	3
