= Nikola Tonev =

Macedonian retired football defender (born 1985)

Personal information
- Full name: Nikola Tonev; Никола Тонев
- Date of birth: 12 November 1985 (age 40)
- Place of birth: Štip, SFR Yugoslavia
- Height: 1.86 m (6 ft 1 in)
- Position: Defender

Youth career
- Bregalnica

Senior career*
Years	Team	Apps	(Gls)
2006–2007	Vardar	30	(0)
2007–2008	→ Shkëndija (loan)	33	(2)
2008–2009	Baník Most	15	(0)
2010	Taraz	30	(1)
2011	Volgar-Gazprom	17	(1)
2012	Zhetysu	26	(0)
2013–2014	Tobol	39	(2)
2015–2016	Bregalnica	22	(1)
2016–2019	Kit-Go		

International career
2006	Macedonia U-21		
- * Club domestic league appearances and goals as of 14:31, 11 December 2014 (UTC)

Nikola Tonev (born 12 November 1985) is a Macedonian retired football defender, who last played for Kit-Go Pehčevo.

== Club career ==
He joined Vardar from hometown club Bregalnica in 2006.

In 2011, Tonev moved to Russian side Volgar. He made his debut in the FNL for FC Volgar-Gazprom Astrakhan on 15 May 2011 in a game against FC Chernomorets Novorossiysk.

=== Controversy ===
On 6 August 2014, Tonev was found guilty by the KFF Control & Disciplinary Committee of providing false documents which showed he was a Kazakhstani citizen. He was subsequently fined 500,000₸ (€2100) and banned from participating in Kazakh football for life. His club, FC Tobol, were fined 700,000₸ and deducted 3 points in the Kazakhstan Premier League.
