= Nikita Khokhlov (footballer, born 1983) =

Kazakhstani footballer

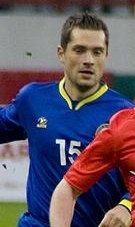

Personal information
- Date of birth: 27 October 1983 (age 43)
- Place of birth: Krasnodar, Soviet Union
- Height: 1.81 m (5 ft 11 in)
- Position: Midfielder

Senior career*
Years	Team	Apps	(Gls)
2001–2002	CSKA Moscow	0	(0)
2003–2006	Astana	110	(10)
2007	Rahat		
2008–2011	Aktobe	68	(1)
2012	Atyrau	14	(0)
2013–2016	Okzhetpes	75	(9)

International career
2004–2005	Kazakhstan U21	6	(0)
2005–2008	Kazakhstan	17	(0)
- * Club domestic league appearances and goals

Nikita Khokhlov (born 27 October 1983) is a Kazakh former football midfielder. He is the alumni of PFC CSKA Moscow academy. He has capped for Kazakhstan national football team 17 times.

== Career statistics ==
=== International ===
Kazakhstan
Year	Apps	Goals
2005	5	0
2006	10	0
2007	0	0
2008	2	0
Total	17	0

Statistics accurate as of match played 27 May 2008
