= Arslan Satubaldin =

Kazakhstani footballer (born 1984)

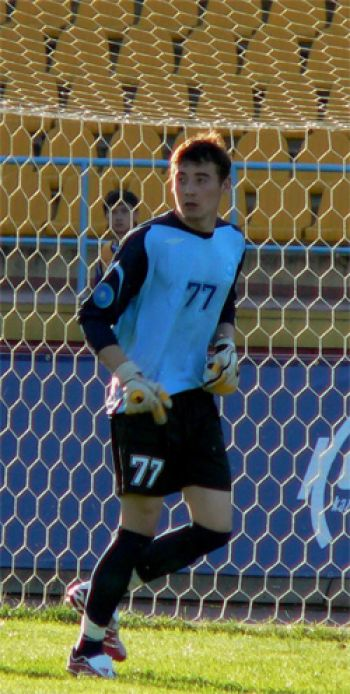
- 2011

Personal information
- Full name: Arslan Saparniyazovich Satubaldin
- Date of birth: 14 August 1984 (age 42)
- Place of birth: Kazakhstan
- Position: Goalkeeper

Senior career*
| Years | Team | Apps | (Gls) |
| 2005–2007 | Okzhetpes | 19 | (0) |
| 2007 | Zhetysu | 1 | (0) |
| 2008 | Atyrau | 0 | (0) |
| 2008–2009 | Okzhetpes | 20 | (0) |
| 2010 | Taraz | 3 | (0) |
| 2010–2011 | Astana | 0 | (0) |
| 2011 | Kaisar | 2 | (0) |
| 2011 | Aktobe | 0 | (0) |
| 2012 | Astana-64 | 0 | (0) |
| 2013–2015 | Tobol | 9 | (0) |
| 2016 | Altai | 0 | (0) |
| 2017 | Taraz | 0 | (0) |
- * Club domestic league appearances and goals

Arslan Saparniyazovich Satubaldin (Russian: Арслан Сатубалдин; born 14 August 1984) is a Kazakhstani former footballer who played as a goalkeeper.

== Early life ==
Satubaldin was born in Kazakhstan in 1984. He changed his last name from Begnepesov to Satubaldin.

== Career ==
Satubaldin started his career with Kazakhstani side Okzhetpes. On 7 June 2006, debuted for the club during a 0–2 loss to Ekibastuzets. In 2007, he signed for Kazakhstani side Zhetysu. In 2008, he signed for Kazakhstani side Atyrau. After that, he signed for Kazakhstani side Okzhetpes. In 2010, he signed for Kazakhstani side Taraz. After that, he signed for Kazakhstani side Astana. In 2011, he signed for Kazakhstani side Kaisar. After that, he signed for Kazakhstani side Aktobe. In 2012, he signed for Kazakhstani side Astana-64. In 2013, he signed for Kazakhstani side Tobol. In 2016, he signed for Kazakhstani side Altai. In 2017, he returned to Kazakhstani side Taraz.

== Personal life ==
He has been married. After retiring from professional football, he worked as a goalkeeper coach.
