= Ivan Sadownichy =

Belarusian footballer

Personal information
- Full name: Ivan Mikalayevich Sadownichy
- Date of birth: 11 May 1987 (age 39)
- Place of birth: Grodno, Belarusian SSR, Soviet Union
- Height: 1.93 m (6 ft 4 in)
- Position: Defender

Team information
- Current team: Neman Grodno
- Number: 20

Youth career
- 2004–2007: Neman Grodno

Senior career*
Years	Team	Apps	(Gls)
2006	Neman Grodno	0	(0)
2007–2010	Belcard Grodno	71	(5)
2011–2012	Vitebsk	54	(4)
2013–2014	Neman Grodno	32	(2)
2014–2015	Tobol	41	(3)
2016–2017	Shakhter Karagandy	30	(0)
2018	Zhetysu	15	(1)
2019	Kaisar	13	(0)
2021–	Neman Grodno	122	(10)

International career^{‡}
2021	Belarus	1	(0)
- * Club domestic league appearances and goals as of 3 July 2026 ‡ National team caps and goals as of 11 October 2021

Ivan Mikalayevich Sadownichy (Belarusian: Іван Мiкалаевiч Садоўнiчы; Russian: Иван Николаевич Садовничий; born 11 May 1987) is a Belarusian professional footballer who plays for Neman Grodno.

== Club career ==
In June 2014, Sadownichy moved to FC Tobol.

== International career ==
He made his debut for the Belarus national football team on 11 October 2021 in a World Cup qualifier against the Czech Republic.

== Honours ==
Kaisar

- Kazakhstan Cup winner: 2019

== Career statistics ==
=== Club ===
As of match played 10 November 2019

Appearances and goals by club, season and competition
Club	Season	League			National Cup		League Cup		Continental		Other		Total	
Club	Season	Division	Apps	Goals	Apps	Goals	Apps	Goals	Apps	Goals	Apps	Goals	Apps	Goals
Neman Grodno	2013	Belarusian Premier League	22	2	2	0	–		–		–		24	2
Neman Grodno	2014	Belarusian Premier League	10	0	3	0	–		–		–		13	0
Neman Grodno	Total		32	2	5	0	-	-	-	-	-	-	37	2
Tobol	2014	Kazakhstan Premier League	13	1	0	0	–		–		–		13	1
Tobol	2015	Kazakhstan Premier League	28	2	2	0	–		–		–		30	2
Tobol	Total		41	3	2	0	-	-	-	-	-	-	43	3
Shakhter Karagandy	2016	Kazakhstan Premier League	30	0	1	0	–		–		–		31	0
Zhetysu	2018	Kazakhstan Premier League	15	1	1	0	–		–		–		16	1
Kaisar	2019	Kazakhstan Premier League	13	0	3	2	–		–		–		16	2
Career total			131	6	11	2	-	-	-	-	-	-	142	8
