= Daniil Chertov =

Russian footballer

Personal information
- Full name: Daniil Vladimirovich Chertov
- Date of birth: 15 November 1990 (age 35)
- Place of birth: Moscow, Russian SFSR
- Height: 1.80 m (5 ft 11 in)
- Position: Defender

Senior career*
Years	Team	Apps	(Gls)
2007–2009	Nika Moscow	51	(8)
2010	Torpedo Moscow	27	(6)
2011	Vityaz Podolsk	5	(0)
2011	Podolye Podolsky district	10	(1)
2012	Metallurg Lipetsk	16	(5)
2012–2013	Sokol Saratov	21	(1)
2014	Khimki	28	(6)
2015–2017	Okzhetpes	57	(1)
2020	Okzhetpes	7	(0)
- * Club domestic league appearances and goals

Daniil Vladimirovich Chertov (Russian: Даниил Владимирович Чертов; born 15 November 1990) is a Russian former professional football player.

== Career ==
On 29 January 2020, FC Okzhetpes announced that they had re-signed Chertov on a contract until the end of 2020.

== Career statistics ==
As of match played 15 March 2020

Appearances and goals by club, season and competition
Club	Season	League			National Cup		Continental		Total	
Club	Season	Division	Apps	Goals	Apps	Goals	Apps	Goals	Apps	Goals
Torpedo Moscow	2010	Second Division	27	6	4	1	-		31	7
Vityaz Podolsk	2011–12	Second Division	5	0	1	0	-		6	0
Podolye Podolsky	2011–12	Second Division	10	1	0	0	-		10	1
Metallurg Lipetsk	2011–12	Second Division	8	1	0	0	-		8	1
Metallurg Lipetsk	2012–13	Second Division	8	4	1	0	-		9	4
Metallurg Lipetsk	Total		16	5	1	0	-	-	17	5
Sokol Saratov	2012–13	Second Division	21	1	0	0	-		21	1
Khimki	2013–14	Professional Football League	10	1	0	0	-		11	1
Khimki	2014–15	Professional Football League	18	5	1	0	-		19	5
Khimki	Total		28	6	1	0	-	-	29	6
Okzhetpes	2015	Kazakhstan Premier League	27	0	2	0	-		29	0
Okzhetpes	2016	Kazakhstan Premier League	20	1	2	1	-		22	1
Okzhetpes	2017	Kazakhstan Premier League	10	0	2	1	-		12	1
Okzhetpes	Total		57	1	6	2	-	-	63	3
Okzhetpes	2020	Kazakhstan Premier League	2	0	0	0	-		2	0
Career total			166	20	13	3	-	-	179	23
