= Tomáš Šimkovič =

Austrian footballer (born 1987)

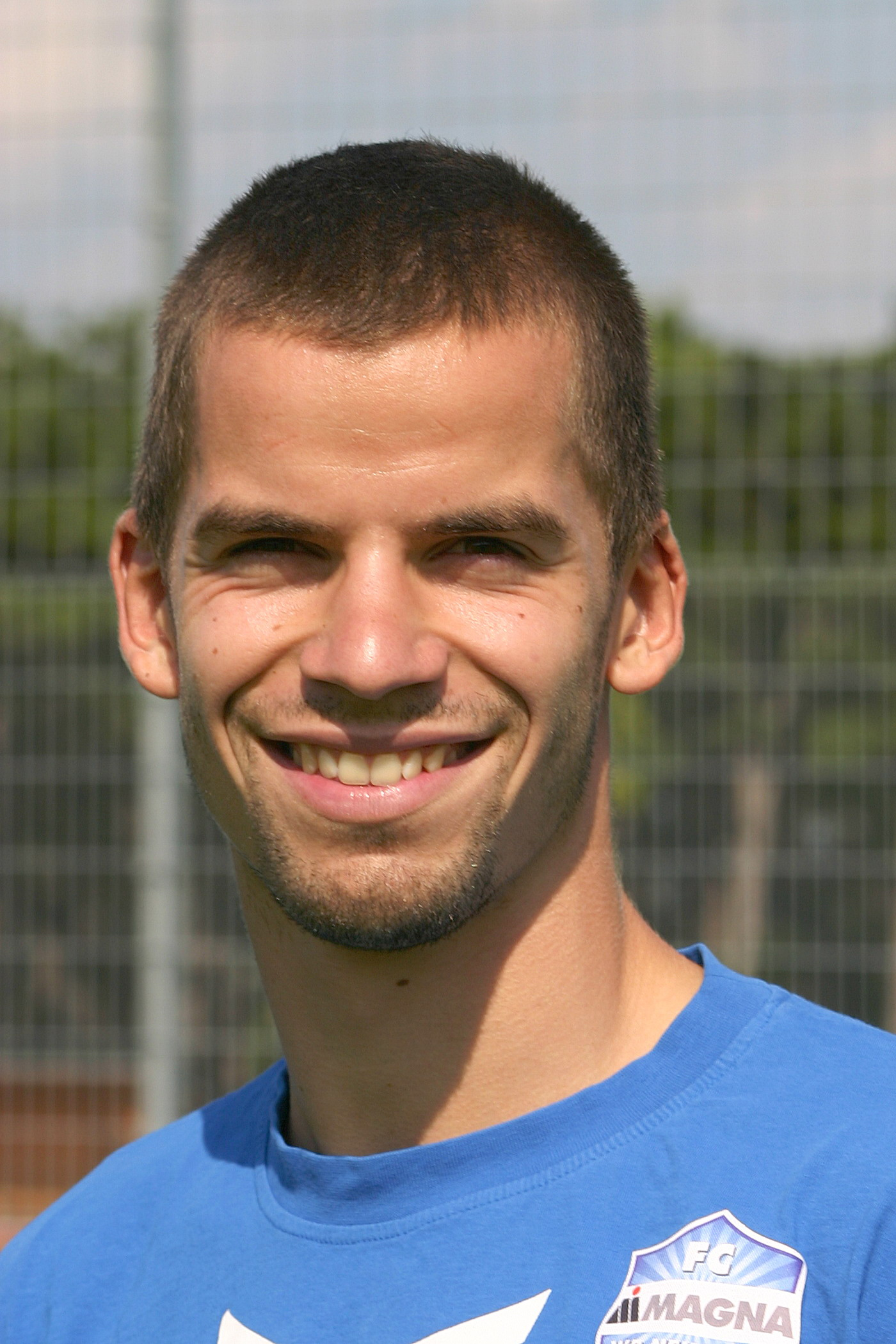

Personal information
- Date of birth: 16 April 1987 (age 39)
- Place of birth: Bratislava, Czechoslovakia
- Height: 1.78 m (5 ft 10 in)
- Position: Midfielder

Team information
- Current team: RFS
- Number: 81

Senior career*
Years	Team	Apps	(Gls)
2005–2007	Austria Wien Amateure	60	(9)
2008	SC Schwanenstadt	11	(1)
2008–2012	Wiener Neustadt	79	(12)
2012–2014	Austria Wien	51	(6)
2014–2017	Tobol	87	(18)
2017–2018	Aktobe	14	(5)
2018–2019	Žalgiris	31	(7)
2019–2021	RFS	76	(23)
2022	First Vienna	9	(1)
2022–	RFS	11	(1)

International career
2007	Austria U20	4	(0)
- * Club domestic league appearances and goals as of 6 October 2022

Tomáš Šimkovič (born 16 April 1987) is an Austrian footballer who plays as a midfielder for Latvian club RFS.

== Career ==
On 1 February 2014, Šimkovič signed a two-year contract with Kazakhstan Premier League side FC Tobol.

On 17 June 2017, Šimkovič signed for FC Aktobe, signing for FK Žalgiris on 3 February 2018.

In February 2019, Šimkovič joined Rīgas FS in Latvia.

In January 2022 he joined Austrian club First Vienna FC.

== Career statistics ==
=== Club ===
As of match played 5 November 2017

Appearances and goals by club, season and competition
Club	Season	League			National Cup		Continental		Total	
Club	Season	Division	Apps	Goals	Apps	Goals	Apps	Goals	Apps	Goals
Austria Wien	2011–12	Austrian Bundesliga	13	2	1	0	-		14	2
Austria Wien	2012–13	Austrian Bundesliga	28	3	4	0	-		32	3
Austria Wien	2013–14	Austrian Bundesliga	10	1	1	0	4	0	15	1
Austria Wien	Total		51	6	6	0	4	0	61	6
Tobol	2014	Kazakhstan Premier League	26	5	0	0	-		26	5
Tobol	2015	Kazakhstan Premier League	27	5	4	1	-		30	6
Tobol	2016	Kazakhstan Premier League	28	8	0	0	-		28	8
Tobol	2017	Kazakhstan Premier League	6	0	1	0	-		7	0
Tobol	Total		87	18	5	1	-	-	92	19
Aktobe	2017	Kazakhstan Premier League	14	5	0	0	-		14	5
Career total			152	29	11	1	4	0	167	30

== Honours ==
Individual

- A Lyga Team of the Year: 2018
- A Lyga Player of the Month: September & October 2018
