= Jiří Jeslínek (footballer, born 1987) =

Czech footballer

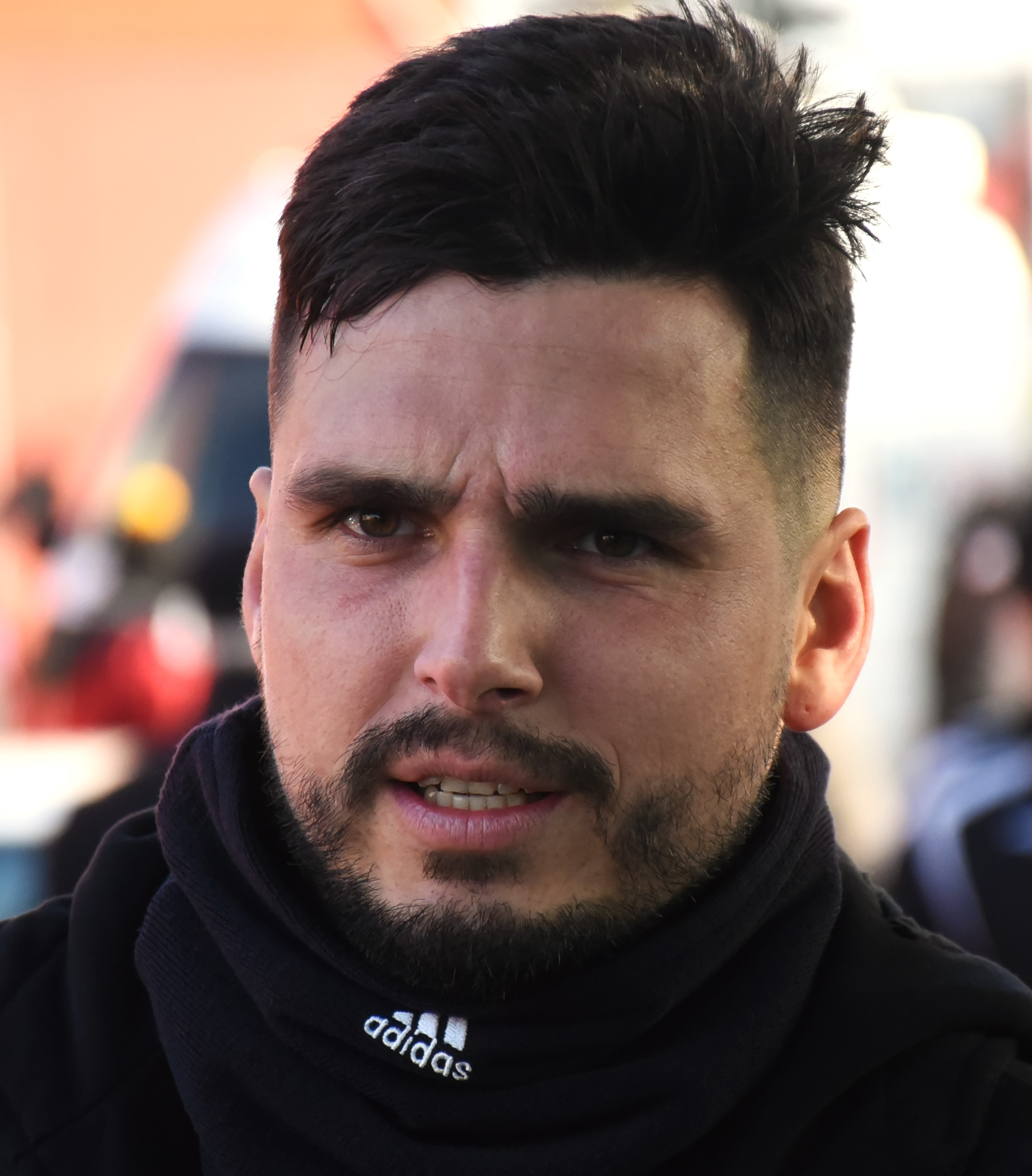

Personal information
- Full name: Jiří Jeslínek
- Date of birth: 30 September 1987 (age 39)
- Place of birth: Prague, Czechoslovakia
- Height: 1.78 m (5 ft 10 in)
- Position: Striker

Youth career
- 1997–2005: Sparta Prague

Senior career*
Years	Team	Apps	(Gls)
2005–2011	Sparta Prague	16	(1)
2006–2007	→ České Budějovice (loan)	8	(0)
2007	→ FK SIAD Most (loan)	1	(0)
2007	→ SK Kladno (loan)	22	(6)
2008–2010	→ Bohemians Prague (loan)	27	(8)
2011–2013	Kryvbas Kryvyi Rih	52	(4)
2013	Mladá Boleslav	8	(0)
2014	Tobol	27	(5)
2015	Celje	16	(1)
2015–2016	Rapid București	11	(1)
2016	Dacia Chișinău	0	(0)
2016–2017	Bohemians 1905	6	(0)
2017	Vlašim	18	(2)

International career
2007–2008	Czech Republic U-21	5	(2)
- * Club domestic league appearances and goals as of 8 April 2018

Jiří Jeslínek (born 30 September 1987 in Prague) is a Czech football who plays as a striker.

== Career ==
In early 2011, Jeslínek signed a three-year contract with a Ukrainian Premier League side Kryvbas. In July 2013 Jeslínek returned to the Czech Republic, signing for Mladá Boleslav, before moving to the Kazakhstan Premier League in January 2014, signing for FC Tobol.
