= Vitali Volkov =

Russian footballer

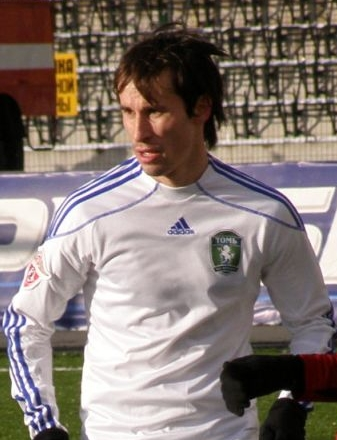

Personal information
- Full name: Vitali Vladimirovich Volkov
- Date of birth: 22 March 1981 (age 45)
- Place of birth: Moscow, Soviet Russia
- Height: 1.75 m (5 ft 9 in)
- Position: Midfielder

Youth career
- FShM Moscow

Senior career*
Years	Team	Apps	(Gls)
1999–2000	Torpedo-2 Moscow	52	(3)
1999–2006	Torpedo Moscow	93	(6)
2007	Rubin Kazan	22	(1)
2008–2010	Tom Tomsk	36	(0)
2010	→ Volga Nizhny Novgorod (loan)	14	(3)
2011–2014	Tobol	117	(6)
2015–2017	Okzhetpes	89	(4)
2018–2021	Aktobe	66	(3)

International career
2000	Russia U19	4	(0)
2003	Russia U21	2	(0)
- * Club domestic league appearances and goals

Vitali Vladimirovich Volkov (Russian: Виталий Владимирович Волков, born 22 March 1981) is a former Russian footballer.

== Club career ==
He finished as top scorer in the UEFA Intertoto Cup 2007.

== Career statistics ==
As of match played 10 November 2019

Appearances and goals by club, season and competition
Club	Season	League			Cup		Continental		Other		Total	
Club	Season	Division	Apps	Goals	Apps	Goals	Apps	Goals	Apps	Goals	Apps	Goals
Torpedo-2 Moscow	1999	PFL	22	2	0	0	–		–		22	2
Torpedo-2 Moscow	2000	PFL	30	1	0	0	–		–		30	1
Torpedo-2 Moscow	Total		52	3	0	0	0	0	0	0	52	3
Torpedo Moscow	1999	Russian Premier League	0	0	0	0	–		–		0	0
Torpedo Moscow	2000	Russian Premier League	0	0	0	0	0	0	–		0	0
Torpedo Moscow	2001	Russian Premier League	3	0	0	0	0	0	–		3	0
Torpedo Moscow	2002	Russian Premier League	14	0	1	0	–		–		15	0
Torpedo Moscow	2003	Russian Premier League	15	2	2	0	6	2	5 (Note: Five appearances in the Russian Premier League Cup)	0	28	4
Torpedo Moscow	2004	Russian Premier League	24	1	2	0	–		–		26	1
Torpedo Moscow	2005	Russian Premier League	25	3	5	0	–		–		30	3
Torpedo Moscow	2006	Russian Premier League	12	0	1	0	–		–		13	0
Torpedo Moscow	Total		93	6	11	0	6	2	5	0	115	8
Rubin Kazan	2007	Russian Premier League	22	1	2	1	4	4	–		28	6
Tom Tomsk	2008	Russian Premier League	19	0	2	0	–		–		21	0
Tom Tomsk	2009	Russian Premier League	17	0	1	0	–		–		18	0
Tom Tomsk	2010	Russian Premier League	0	0	0	0	–		–		0	0
Tom Tomsk	Total		36	0	3	0	0	0	0	0	39	0
Volga Nizhny Novgorod	2010	FNL	14	3	1	0	–		–		15	3
Tobol	2011	Kazakhstan Premier League	31	4	5	1	2	0	1 (Note: One appearances in the Kazakhstan Super Cup)	0	39	5
Tobol	2012	Kazakhstan Premier League	25	0	3	0	–		–		28	0
Tobol	2013	Kazakhstan Premier League	32	1	2	1	–		–		34	2
Tobol	2014	Kazakhstan Premier League	29	1	3	0	–		–		32	1
Tobol	Total		117	6	13	2	2	0	1	0	133	8
Okzhetpes	2015	Kazakhstan Premier League	32	2	2	0	–		–		34	2
Okzhetpes	2016	Kazakhstan Premier League	31	0	1	0	–		–		32	0
Okzhetpes	2017	Kazakhstan Premier League	26	2	1	0	–		–		27	2
Okzhetpes	Total		89	4	4	0	0	0	0	0	93	4
Aktobe	2018	Kazakhstan Premier League	24	0	0	0	–		–		24	0
Aktobe	2019	Kazakhstan Premier League	32	1	1	0	–		–		33	1
Aktobe	Total		56	1	1	0	-	-	-	-	57	1
Career total			479	24	35	3	12	6	6	0	556	33
