= Aleksandr Petukhov (footballer, born 1985) =

Kazakhstani footballer

Personal information
- Full name: Aleksandr Anatolyevich Petukhov
- Date of birth: 11 January 1985 (age 41)
- Place of birth: Dzhezkazgan, Soviet Union
- Height: 1.85 m (6 ft 1 in)
- Position: Goalkeeper

Senior career*
Years	Team	Apps	(Gls)
2002	Atyrau	2	(0)
2003–2006	Rubin Kazan (reserves)	41	(1)
2006	Rubin-2 Kazan	6	(0)
2006–2016	Tobol	212	(0)

International career^{‡}
2004–2006	Kazakhstan U21	3	(0)
- * Club domestic league appearances and goals as of 10 January 2017 ‡ National team caps and goals as of 21 December 2010

Aleksandr Anatolyevich Petukhov (Russian: Александр Анато́льевич Петухов; born 11 January 1985) is a Kazakh professional footballer who plays as a goalkeeper, most recently for FC Tobol.

== Career ==
Born in Dzhezkazgan (now Jezkazgan), Petukhov began playing football with local side FC Atyrau. In 2003, he moved to Russia where he signed for FC Rubin Kazan. He played for Rubin's reserve and second teams from 2003 to 2006, including a brief stint as a left-back in 2004.

After returning from Russia, Petukhov joined Tobol where he has been the club's starting goalkeeper. He has appeared for the club in the UEFA Europa League qualifying rounds and was voted by the fans the club's best player in April 2010. He signed a one-year contract extension with Tobol in January 2014.

Petukhov has played for the Kazakhstan youth national team. He has been called up to the senior national team, but has never appeared in a competitive international.

Petukhov left FC Tobol in December 2016.

== Club career statistics ==
Last update: 8 November 2010

Season	Team	Country	League	Level	Apps	Goals	Cup	Europe
2002	Atyrau	Kazakhstan	Premier League	1	2	0	0	0
2003	Rubin Kazan (reserves)	Russia	Reserves tournament	-	8	0	?	-
2004	Rubin Kazan (reserves)	Russia	Reserves tournament	-	19	1	?	-
2005	Rubin Kazan (reserves)	Russia	Reserves tournament	-	14	0	?	-
2006	Rubin-2 Kazan	Russia	Second Division	3	6	0	?	-
2006	Tobol	Kazakhstan	Premier League	1	11	0	0	0
2007	Tobol	Kazakhstan	Premier League	1	26	0	5	5
2008	Tobol	Kazakhstan	Premier League	1	23	0	1	2
2009	Tobol	Kazakhstan	Premier League	1	19	0	3	2
2010	Tobol	Kazakhstan	Premier League	1	29	0	0	2
Total					157	1	9	11

== Honours ==
with Tobol

- Intertoto Cup Winner: 2007
- Kazakhstan League Champion: 2010
- Kazakhstan League Runner-up: 2007, 2008
- Kazakhstan Cup Winner: 2007
