= Nurtas Kurgulin =

Kazakhstani footballer

Personal information
- Full name: Nurtas Malikovich Kurgulin
- Date of birth: 20 September 1986 (age 40)
- Place of birth: Taraz, Dzhambul Region, Kazakh SSR, Soviet Union
- Height: 1.75 m (5 ft 9 in)
- Position: Midfielder

Team information
- Current team: Taraz
- Number: 17

Senior career*
| Years | Team | Apps | (Gls) |
| 2005–2012 | Taraz | 145 | (3) |
| 2012 | Astana | 0 | (0) |
| 2013–2016 | Tobol | 75 | (0) |
| 2017– | Taraz | 9 | (0) |

International career^{‡}
| 2011– | Kazakhstan | 2 | (0) |
- * Club domestic league appearances and goals as of 8 November 2017 ‡ National team caps and goals as of 3 May 2013

Nūrtas Mälıkūly Kurgulin (Kazakh: Нұртас Мәлікұлы Кургулин; born 20 September 1986) is a Kazakh international footballer who plays for FC Taraz, as a midfielder.

== Career ==
In December 2016, Kurgulin left FC Tobol.

== Career statistics ==
=== International ===
Kazakhstan national team
| Year | Apps | Goals |
|---|---|---|
| 2011 | 1 | 0 |
| 2012 | 1 | 0 |
| Total | 2 | 0 |

Statistics accurate as of match played 5 June 2012
