= Štěpán Kučera =

Czech footballer (born 1984)

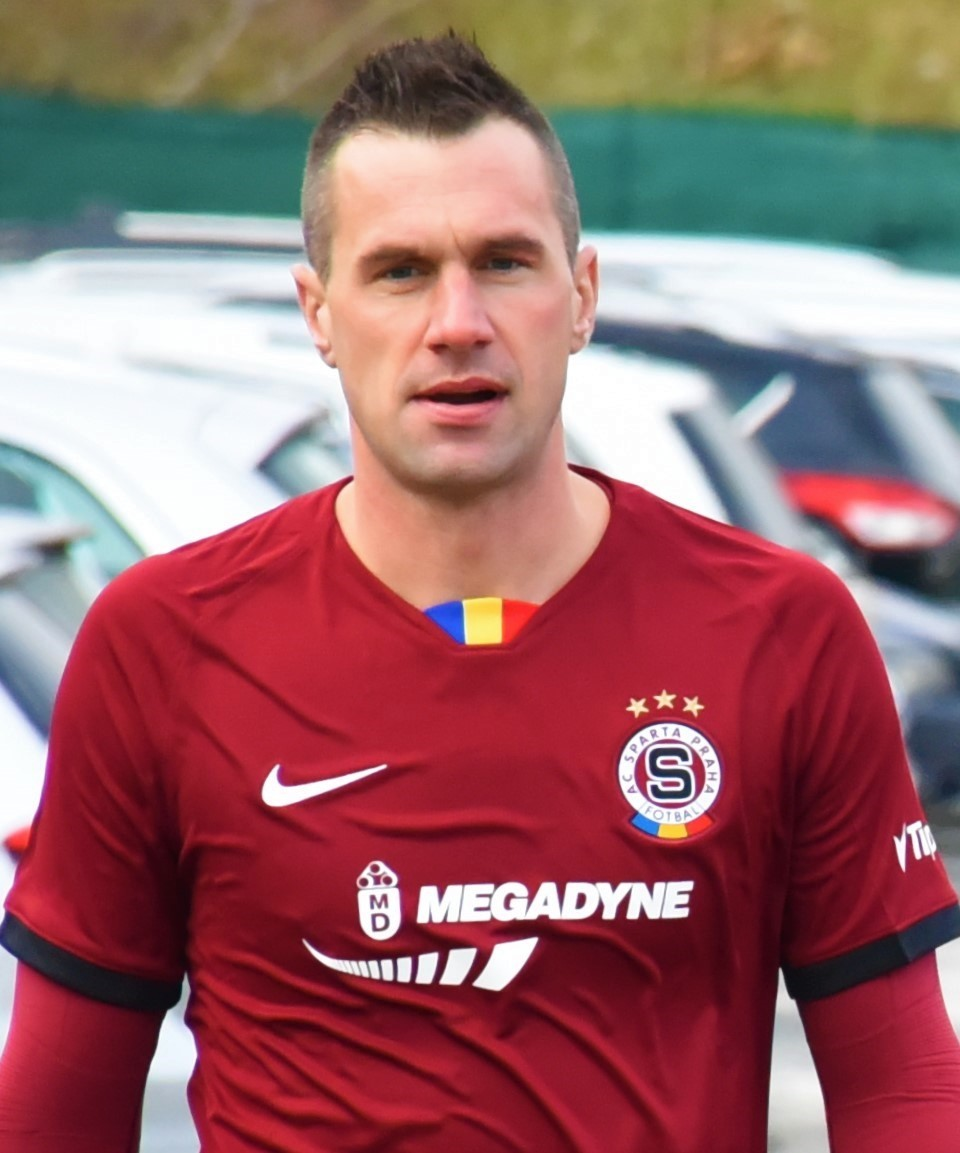

Personal information
- Full name: Štěpán Kučera
- Date of birth: 11 June 1984 (age 42)
- Place of birth: Prague, Czechoslovakia
- Height: 1.91 m (6 ft 3 in)
- Position: Centre-back

Team information
- Current team: SK Zbraslav

Youth career
- 1991–1999: Sokol Bíla Hora
- 1999–2001: Chmel Blšany
- 2001–2002: Sparta Prague

Senior career*
Years	Team	Apps	(Gls)
2003–2007	Sparta Prague	10	(0)
2006	→ Jablonec (loan)	23	(1)
2007–2010	Club Brugge	5	(0)
2008	→ Sparta Prague (loan)	10	(0)
2009	→ Jablonec (loan)	10	(0)
2009–2010	→ Roeselare (loan)	19	(0)
2010	Kladno	5	(1)
2011	Tobol	22	(0)
2012–2013	Irtysh	52	(1)
2014–2015	Tobol	35	(0)
2016	Slavoj Vyšehrad	10	(1)
2016–2020	Štěchovice		
2020–2022	Povltavska FA	36	(6)
2022–	SK Zbraslav		

International career
2005–2007	Czech Republic U21	3	(0)
- * Club domestic league appearances and goals as of 21:42, 8 February 2023 (UTC)

Štěpán Kučera (born 11 June 1984 in Prague) is a Czech footballer who plays as a centre-back for SK Zbraslav.

== Career ==
Kučera began his professional career with AC Sparta Prague and was loaned to FK Jablonec 97 before moving to Club Brugge in July 2007.

In the 2008–2009 season he was out on loan to Sparta Prague due to several disappointing performances with Club Brugge the year before. For the 2009–2010 season he returned to Club Brugge.

In January 2014, Kučera resigned for Kazakhstan Premier League side FC Tobol.
