= List of Kazakhstan football transfers winter 2019–20 =

This is a list of Kazakh football transfers in the winter transfer window 2020 by club. Only clubs of the 2020 Kazakhstan Premier League are included.

== Kazakhstan Premier League 2020 ==
=== Astana ===
In: Note: Flags indicate national team as defined under FIFA eligibility rules; some limited exceptions apply. Players may hold more than one non-FIFA nationality.

No.	Pos.	Nation	Player
5	DF	KAZ	Serhiy Malyi (loan return from (Kazakhstan) Ordabasy)
7	MF	ARM	Tigran Barseghyan (from (Kazakhstan) Kaisar)
20	FW	CYP	Pieros Sotiriou (from (Denmark) Copenhagen)
22	GK	KAZ	Dmytro Nepohodov (loan return from (Kazakhstan) Ordabasy)
29	MF	BLR	Max Ebong (from (Belarus) Shakhtyor Soligorsk)
99	FW	KAZ	Aleksey Shchotkin (loan return from (Kazakhstan) Ordabasy)

Out: Note: Flags indicate national team as defined under FIFA eligibility rules; some limited exceptions apply. Players may hold more than one non-FIFA nationality.

No.	Pos.	Nation	Player
7	MF	KAZ	Serikzhan Muzhikov (to (Kazakhstan) Tobol)
19	DF	KAZ	Marat Bystrov (loan extended to (Kazakhstan) Ordabasy)
20	MF	AZE	Richard Almeida (to (United Arab Emirates) Baniyas, previously on loan to (Azerbaijan) Qarabağ)
32	FW	CUW	Rangelo Janga (loan to (Switzerland) Lugano)
35	GK	KAZ	Aleksandr Mokin (to (Kazakhstan) Kyzylzhar)
45	FW	KAZ	Roman Murtazayev (to (Kazakhstan) Tobol)
42	MF	KAZ	Lev Skvortsov (loan to (Kazakhstan) Atyrau)
55	DF	KAZ	Talgat Kusyapov (to (Kazakhstan) Okzhetpes, previously on loan at (Kazakhstan) Caspiy)
70	MF	KAZ	Sultan Sagnayev (loan to (Kazakhstan) Caspiy, previously on loan to (Kazakhstan) Irtysh Pavlodar)
80	FW	KAZ	Vladislav Prokopenko (loan to (Kazakhstan) Aktobe)
81	FW	KAZ	Ramazan Karimov (loan to (Kazakhstan) Caspiy)
87	MF	KAZ	Zhaslan Kairkenov (loan to (Kazakhstan) Atyrau)
91	FW	KAZ	Sergei Khizhnichenko (to (Kazakhstan) Ordabasy)

=== Caspiy ===
In: Note: Flags indicate national team as defined under FIFA eligibility rules; some limited exceptions apply. Players may hold more than one non-FIFA nationality.

No.	Pos.	Nation	Player
5	DF	KAZ	Mikhail Gabyshev (from (Kazakhstan) Atyrau)
6	DF	KAZ	Rakhymzhan Rozybakiev (from (Kazakhstan) Taraz)
8	MF	SRB	Stefan Bukorac (from (Belarus) Torpedo-BelAZ Zhodino)
11	MF	SRB	Aleksandar Stanisavljević (from (Serbia) Voždovac)
14	MF	UKR	Taras Bondarenko (from (Serbia) Radnički Niš)
22	MF	KAZ	Marat Shakhmetov (on loan from (Kazakhstan) Shakhter Karagandy)
26	MF	KAZ	Yerkin Tapalov (from (Kazakhstan) Zhetysu)
37	MF	RUS	Vladislav Sirotov (from (Russia) Tekstilshchik Ivanovo)
44	MF	TOG	Serge Nyuiadzi (from (Kazakhstan) Taraz)
51	GK	RUS	Denis Kavlinov (from (Belarus) Gomel)
55	DF	RUS	Layonel Adams (from (Belarus) Isloch Minsk Raion)
70	MF	KAZ	Sultan Sagnayev (on loan from (Kazakhstan) Astana)
81	FW	KAZ	Ramazan Karimov (on loan from (Kazakhstan) Astana)
91	GK	SRB	Marko Milošević (from (Serbia) Napredak Kruševac)
—	DF	SRB	Bojan Kovačević (loan from (Serbia) Proleter Novi Sad)

Out: Note: Flags indicate national team as defined under FIFA eligibility rules; some limited exceptions apply. Players may hold more than one non-FIFA nationality.

No.	Pos.	Nation	Player
—	GK	KAZ	Danil Podymksy (loan return to (Kazakhstan) Astana)
—	DF	BIH	Saša Kolunija
—	DF	KAZ	Talgat Kusyapov (loan return to (Kazakhstan) Astana)
—	MF	KAZ	Kazbek Geteriev (to (Russia) Kyzyltash Bakhchisaray)
—	MF	KAZ	Ruslan Sakhalbaev
—	FW	CRO	Branko Čubrilo
—	FW	KAZ	Kuanysh Begalin (to (Kazakhstan) Ekibastuz)
—	FW	KAZ	Zhandos Soltan (to (Kazakhstan) Altai Semey)

=== Irtysh Pavlodar ===
In: Note: Flags indicate national team as defined under FIFA eligibility rules; some limited exceptions apply. Players may hold more than one non-FIFA nationality.

No.	Pos.	Nation	Player
6	MF	SRB	Marko Tomić (from (Lithuania) Žalgiris)
9	FW	RUS	Maksim Zhitnev (from (Russia) Tom Tomsk)
10	FW	GEO	Levan Kutalia (from (Georgia (country)) Dinamo Tbilisi)
12	GK	BLR	Syarhey Chernik (from (Belarus) BATE Borisov)
16	GK	KAZ	Serikbol Kapanov (from (Kazakhstan) Ekibastuz)
17	MF	ARG	Pablo Podio (from (Czech Republic) Fastav Zlín)
18	MF	MNE	Bojan Sanković (from (Hungary) Újpest)
23	FW	KAZ	Timur Baizhanov (from (Kazakhstan) Okzhetpes)
44	DF	KAZ	Grigori Sartakov (from (Kazakhstan) Tobol)
77	MF	AUT	Kristijan Dobras (from (Australia) Melbourne Victory)
90	DF	RUS	Andrei Khripkov (from (Russia) Mordovia Saransk)
92	DF	RUS	Valeri Pochivalin (from (Russia) Khimki)

Out: Note: Flags indicate national team as defined under FIFA eligibility rules; some limited exceptions apply. Players may hold more than one non-FIFA nationality.

No.	Pos.	Nation	Player
5	DF	SRB	Uroš Vitas (to (Serbia) Partizan)
8	MF	HUN	Patrik Hidi (to (Hungary) Budapest Honvéd)
9	FW	KAZ	Timur Muldinov (to (Kazakhstan) Kyzylzhar)
10	FW	SRB	Dejan Georgijević (loan return to (Hungary) Ferencváros)
11	MF	KAZ	Madiyar Raimbek
14	MF	FRA	Jérémy Manzorro (to (Kazakhstan) Shakhter Karagandy)
17	MF	KAZ	Nurzhigit Smatov
22	GK	KAZ	Andrey Pasechenko (loan return to (Kazakhstan) Tobol)
23	DF	KAZ	Sagadat Tursynbay (to (Kazakhstan) Tobol)
33	MF	KAZ	Magomed Paragulgov (loan return to (Kazakhstan) Kairat)
66	MF	KAZ	Sultan Sagnayev (loan return to (Kazakhstan) Astana)
77	DF	KAZ	Aleksandr Sokolenko (loan return to (Kazakhstan) Kairat)
88	MF	SRB	Marko Stanojević (to (Uzbekistan) Nasaf)
98	GK	KAZ	Ilya Sotnik

=== Kairat ===
In: Note: Flags indicate national team as defined under FIFA eligibility rules; some limited exceptions apply. Players may hold more than one non-FIFA nationality.

No.	Pos.	Nation	Player
6	MF	POL	Jacek Góralski (from (Bulgaria) Ludogorets Razgrad)
7	FW	KAZ	Abat Aimbetov (from (Kazakhstan) Aktobe)
13	MF	ARM	Kamo Hovhannisyan (from (Kazakhstan) Zhetysu)
15	MF	KAZ	Nurlan Dairov (loan return from (Kazakhstan) Okzhetpes)
25	MF	RUS	Kirill Kolesnichenko (from (Russia) Chertanovo Moscow)
27	MF	KGZ	Gulzhigit Alykulov (from (Belarus) Neman Grodno)

Out: Note: Flags indicate national team as defined under FIFA eligibility rules; some limited exceptions apply. Players may hold more than one non-FIFA nationality.

No.	Pos.	Nation	Player
1	GK	KAZ	Vladimir Plotnikov (to (Kazakhstan) Ordabasy)
2	DF	KAZ	Yeldos Akhmetov (to (Kazakhstan) Kaisar)
6	DF	BLR	Syarhey Palitsevich (to (Belarus) Shakhtyor Soligorsk)
7	MF	KAZ	Islambek Kuat (to (Russia) Orenburg)
8	MF	KAZ	Georgy Zhukov (to (Poland) Wisła Kraków)
9	MF	KAZ	Bauyrzhan Islamkhan (to (United Arab Emirates) Al Ain)
13	MF	KOR	Han Jeong-uh (to (South Korea) Suwon)
15	DF	KAZ	Aleksandr Sokolenko (to (Kazakhstan) Kyzylzhar, previously on loan to (Kazakhstan) Irtysh Pavlodar)
19	FW	HUN	Márton Eppel (to (Belgium) Cercle Brugge)
25	FW	KAZ	Samat Sarsenov (to (Latvia) Valmiera Glass ViA, previously on loan to (Kazakhstan) Taraz)
28	FW	KAZ	Rifat Nurmugamet (to (Kazakhstan) Aktobe, previously on loan to (Kazakhstan) Zhetysu)
—	FW	KAZ	Magomed Paragulgov (to (Kazakhstan) Kaisar, previously on loan to (Kazakhstan) Irtysh Pavlodar)

=== Kaisar ===
In: Note: Flags indicate national team as defined under FIFA eligibility rules; some limited exceptions apply. Players may hold more than one non-FIFA nationality.

No.	Pos.	Nation	Player
2	DF	KAZ	Yeldos Akhmetov (from (Kazakhstan) Kairat)
5	DF	KAZ	Bagdat Kairov (from (Kazakhstan) Aktobe)
7	FW	BUL	Aleksandar Kolev (from (Poland) Raków Częstochowa)
9	FW	GEO	Elguja Lobjanidze (from (Kazakhstan) Taraz)
15	DF	UKR	Rizvan Ablitarov (from (Kazakhstan) Atyrau)
17	MF	KAZ	Bekzat Kurmanbekuly (from (Kazakhstan) Baikonur)
22	DF	KAZ	Aleksandr Marochkin (loan from (Kazakhstan) Tobol)
39	DF	RUS	Aleksei Shumskikh (from (Russia) Tom Tomsk)
77	DF	KAZ	Kuanysh Kalmuratov (on loan from (Kazakhstan) Atyrau)
88	FW	KAZ	Magomed Paragulgov (from (Kazakhstan) Kairat)
92	MF	CRO	Ivan Pešić (from (Romania) Dinamo București)
94	MF	CPV	Alvin Fortes (from (Georgia (country)) Dila Gori)
99	FW	MOZ	Reginaldo (from (Kazakhstan) Shakhter Karagandy)

Out: Note: Flags indicate national team as defined under FIFA eligibility rules; some limited exceptions apply. Players may hold more than one non-FIFA nationality.

No.	Pos.	Nation	Player
2	DF	KAZ	Olzhas Altayev
11	MF	ARM	Tigran Barseghyan (to (Kazakhstan) Astana)
18	FW	COD	Kule Mbombo (to (Latvia) Riga)
20	DF	BLR	Ivan Sadownichy
22	DF	KAZ	Aleksandr Marochkin (to (Kazakhstan) Tobol)
27	MF	KAZ	Samat Balymbetov
33	DF	CMR	Abdel Lamanje (to (Kazakhstan) Shakhter Karagandy)
76	FW	BLR	Ihar Zyankovich (to (Kazakhstan) Kyzylzhar)
77	MF	COD	André Bukia (loan return to (Portugal) Arouca)
86	MF	ARU	Joshua John
88	DF	KAZ	Valentin Chureyev (to (Kazakhstan) Atyrau)

=== Kyzylzhar ===
In: Note: Flags indicate national team as defined under FIFA eligibility rules; some limited exceptions apply. Players may hold more than one non-FIFA nationality.

No.	Pos.	Nation	Player
4	MF	ROU	Gabriel Enache (from (Romania) Astra Giurgiu)
5	DF	GEO	Tamaz Tsetskhladze (from (Georgia (country)) Torpedo Kutaisi)
9	FW	RUS	Ivan Markelov
12	MF	MLI	Moussa Koné
14	DF	BLR	Terentiy Lutsevich (from (Belarus) Gomel)
15	DF	KAZ	Aleksandr Sokolenko (from (Kazakhstan) Kairat)
16	MF	MDA	Mihai Plătică (from (Moldova) Milsami Orhei)
19	FW	KAZ	Timur Muldinov (from (Kazakhstan) Irtysh Pavlodar)
21	MF	MNE	Uroš Delić (from (Iran) Gol Gohar Sirjan)
23	DF	KAZ	Berik Shaikhov (from (Kazakhstan) Shakhter Karagandy)
27	DF	LTU	Vytautas Andriuškevičius (from (Kazakhstan) Tobol)
41	GK	RUS	Miroslav Lobantsev (from (Russia) Rotor Volgograd)
66	DF	RUS	Igor Gubanov (from (Belarus) Slutsk)
77	MF	KAZ	Sergei Skorykh (from (Kazakhstan) Shakhter Karagandy)
78	FW	BLR	Ihar Zyankovich (from (Kazakhstan) Kaisar)
—	GK	KAZ	Oleg Grubov (from (Kazakhstan) Kairat Academy)
—	DF	KAZ	Erasyl Amanzhol (loan from (Kazakhstan) Atyrau extended)
—	MF	KAZ	Vladimir Vomenko
—	MF	KGZ	Raul Jalilov (from (Kazakhstan) Zhetysu)

Out: Note: Flags indicate national team as defined under FIFA eligibility rules; some limited exceptions apply. Players may hold more than one non-FIFA nationality.

No.	Pos.	Nation	Player
—	GK	KAZ	Timurbek Zakirov (to (Kazakhstan) Shakhter Karagandy, previously on loan to (Kazakhstan) Taraz)
—	GK	KAZ	Zhandar Zhangaliev (to (Kazakhstan) Makhtaaral)
—	DF	KAZ	Aldan Baltaev
—	DF	KAZ	Bakdaulet Kozhabaev
—	DF	KAZ	Adil Sergaliev
—	DF	KAZ	Karam Sultanov
—	DF	KAZ	Danil Tsoy
—	MF	KAZ	Piraliy Aliev
—	MF	KAZ	Aslan Dzhanuzakov
—	MF	KAZ	Elmar Nabiev
—	MF	KAZ	Erasyl Seitkanov
—	FW	KAZ	Pavel Kriventsev (to (Kazakhstan) Shakhter Karagandy)

=== Okzhetpes ===
In: Note: Flags indicate national team as defined under FIFA eligibility rules; some limited exceptions apply. Players may hold more than one non-FIFA nationality.

No.	Pos.	Nation	Player
1	GK	RUS	Aleksandr Sheplyakov (from (Russia) Dynamo Moscow)
3	DF	KAZ	Talgat Kusyapov (from (Kazakhstan) Astana)
4	DF	BLR	Alyaksey Hawrylovich (from (Belarus) Dinamo Minsk)
5	DF	RUS	Daniil Chertov
9	FW	RUS	Islamnur Abdulavov (from (Kazakhstan) Atyrau)
22	DF	UKR	Andriy Mischenko (from (Russia) SKA-Khabarovsk)
88	MF	BRA	Gian (from (Kazakhstan) Taraz)
91	FW	SRB	Marko Obradović (from (Belarus) Torpedo-BelAZ Zhodino)

Out: Note: Flags indicate national team as defined under FIFA eligibility rules; some limited exceptions apply. Players may hold more than one non-FIFA nationality.

No.	Pos.	Nation	Player
3	MF	KAZ	Nurlan Dairov (loan return to (Kazakhstan) Kairat)
4	DF	KAZ	Timur Rudoselskiy
5	DF	KAZ	Aleksandr Kislitsyn (to (Kazakhstan) Shakhter Karagandy)
7	MF	KAZ	Tanat Nusserbayev
9	MF	KAZ	Ulan Konysbayev
11	FW	KAZ	Timur Baizhanov (to (Kazakhstan) Irtysh Pavlodar)
12	GK	KAZ	Dzhurakhon Babakhanov (to (Kazakhstan) Taraz)
14	FW	LTU	Deimantas Petravičius (to (Scotland) Queen of the South)
23	DF	KAZ	Rinat Abdulin (Retired)
25	MF	UKR	Ivan Bobko (to (Georgia (country)) Torpedo Kutaisi)
99	FW	BRA	Danilo Almeida Alves (to (South Korea) Suwon)

=== Ordabasy ===
In: Note: Flags indicate national team as defined under FIFA eligibility rules; some limited exceptions apply. Players may hold more than one non-FIFA nationality.

No.	Pos.	Nation	Player
4	DF	KAZ	Viktor Dmitrenko (from (Kazakhstan) Tobol)
7	MF	RSA	May Mahlangu (from (Bulgaria) Ludogorets Razgrad, previously on loan)
10	MF	BIH	Mirzad Mehanović (from (Czech Republic) Fastav Zlín, previously on loan)
11	MF	POR	Rúben Brígido (from (Bulgaria) Beroe Stara Zagora)
19	DF	KAZ	Marat Bystrov (loan extended from (Kazakhstan) Astana)
24	DF	RUS	Aleksandr Kleshchenko (from (Russia) Yenisey Krasnoyarsk)
37	FW	BRA	João Paulo (from (Bulgaria) Ludogorets Razgrad, previously on loan)
42	DF	KAZ	Igor Trofimets (from (Kazakhstan) Aktobe)
86	GK	KAZ	Vladimir Plotnikov (from (Kazakhstan) Kairat)
87	DF	SRB	Aleksandar Simčević (from (Kazakhstan) Taraz)
91	FW	KAZ	Sergei Khizhnichenko (from (Kazakhstan) Astana)

Out: Note: Flags indicate national team as defined under FIFA eligibility rules; some limited exceptions apply. Players may hold more than one non-FIFA nationality.

No.	Pos.	Nation	Player
3	MF	KAZ	Valeri Korobkin
8	DF	KAZ	Temirlan Yerlanov (to (Kazakhstan) Tobol)
9	FW	KAZ	Vitali Li
11	MF	UKR	Kyrylo Kovalchuk (Retired)
12	GK	KAZ	Dmytro Nepohodov (loan return to (Kazakhstan) Astana)
21	MF	KAZ	Mukhit Zhaksylyk
23	MF	KAZ	Adilkhan Dobay
25	DF	KAZ	Serhiy Malyi (loan return to (Kazakhstan) Astana)
99	FW	KAZ	Aleksey Shchotkin (loan return to (Kazakhstan) Astana)

=== Shakhter Karagandy ===
In: Note: Flags indicate national team as defined under FIFA eligibility rules; some limited exceptions apply. Players may hold more than one non-FIFA nationality.

No.	Pos.	Nation	Player
1	GK	RUS	David Yurchenko
2	DF	RUS	Dmitri Yatchenko (from (Belarus) Dinamo Minsk)
4	DF	GHA	Gideon Baah (from (Finland) Honka)
5	DF	KAZ	Aleksandr Kislitsyn (from (Kazakhstan) Okzhetpes)
6	DF	NGA	Aliyu Abubakar (from (Ukraine) Olimpik Donetsk)
7	MF	FRA	Jérémy Manzorro (from (Kazakhstan) Irtysh Pavlodar)
8	MF	NGA	Muhammed Usman (from (Russia) Tambov)
9	FW	KAZ	Bauyrzhan Turysbek (from (Kazakhstan) Tobol)
12	FW	CIV	Cédric Kouadio (from (Belarus) Slutsk)
17	MF	KAZ	Aslanbek Kakimov (from (Kazakhstan) Aktobe)
25	DF	RUS	Andrey Buyvolov (from (Russia) Yenisey Krasnoyarsk)
33	DF	CMR	Abdel Lamanje (from (Kazakhstan) Kaisar)
47	MF	KAZ	Pavel Kriventsev (from (Kazakhstan) Kyzylzhar)
78	GK	KAZ	Timurbek Zakirov (from (Kazakhstan) Kyzylzhar)
87	MF	RUS	Mikhail Bakayev (from (Russia) Shinnik Yaroslavl)
88	MF	RUS	Arsen Khubulov (from (Russia) Yenisey Krasnoyarsk)

Out: Note: Flags indicate national team as defined under FIFA eligibility rules; some limited exceptions apply. Players may hold more than one non-FIFA nationality.

No.	Pos.	Nation	Player
1	GK	KAZ	Abylayhan Duisen (to (Kazakhstan) Kyran)
5	DF	UKR	Artem Baranovskyi (to (Uzbekistan) Buxoro)
8	MF	KAZ	Baūyrzhan Baytana
9	MF	CRO	Ivan Pešić (loan return to (Romania) Dinamo București)
13	DF	KAZ	Stanislav Lunin
17	FW	KAZ	Oralkhan Omirtayev (to (Kazakhstan) Tobol)
18	MF	UGA	Luwagga Kizito (loan return to (Romania) Politehnica Iași)
19	DF	KAZ	Yevgeny Tarasov
21	MF	KAZ	Dmitry Bachek
22	MF	KAZ	Marat Shakhmetov (on loan to (Kazakhstan) Caspiy)
23	DF	KAZ	Birzhan Kulbekov (to (Kazakhstan) SDYuSShOR-8 Nursultan)
25	MF	SRB	Miloš Vidović
29	DF	KAZ	Niyaz Shugayev
30	GK	KAZ	Igor Shatskiy (to (Kazakhstan) Tobol)
55	DF	KAZ	Ruslan Alimbayev
72	MF	KAZ	Sergei Skorykh (to (Kazakhstan) Kyzylzhar)
77	DF	KAZ	Berik Shaikhov (to (Kazakhstan) Kyzylzhar)
84	DF	KAZ	Anton Chichulin
88	MF	KOS	Donjet Shkodra (to (Kazakhstan) Zhetysu)
99	FW	MOZ	Reginaldo (to (Kazakhstan) Kaisar)

=== Taraz ===
In: Note: Flags indicate national team as defined under FIFA eligibility rules; some limited exceptions apply. Players may hold more than one non-FIFA nationality.

No.	Pos.	Nation	Player
5	DF	BLR	Valery Karshakevich (from (Russia) Mordovia Saransk)
6	MF	KAZ	Adilet Abdenabi (from (Kazakhstan) Makhtaaral)
9	MF	LTU	Ovidijus Verbickas (from (Lithuania) Sūduva)
13	FW	SRB	Bratislav Punoševac
15	MF	GNB	Toni Silva (from (Romania) Astra Giurgiu)
21	MF	MNE	Jovan Čađenović (from (Lithuania) Sūduva)
23	FW	MNE	Dejan Boljević (from (Montenegro) Budućnost Podgorica)
24	GK	KAZ	Dzhurakhon Babakhanov (from (Kazakhstan) Okzhetpes)
25	DF	RUS	Mikhail Mishchenko (from (Belarus) Torpedo-BelAZ Zhodino)
27	DF	KAZ	Dmitry Evstingeyev (from (Kazakhstan) Makhtaaral)
40	MF	RUS	Ayub Batsuyev (from (Russia) Akhmat Grozny)
70	FW	AUT	Nils Zatl (from (Cyprus) Doxa Katokopias)
95	MF	SRB	Goran Brkić (from (Slovenia) Olimpija Ljubljana)
—	FW	KAZ	Duman Tursynbay (from (Kazakhstan) Altai Semey)

Out: Note: Flags indicate national team as defined under FIFA eligibility rules; some limited exceptions apply. Players may hold more than one non-FIFA nationality.

No.	Pos.	Nation	Player
5	DF	KAZ	Rakhymzhan Rozybakiev (to (Kazakhstan) Caspiy)
6	DF	GEO	Lasha Kasradze (to (Georgia (country)) Torpedo Kutaisi)
13	MF	KAZ	Zhakyp Kozhamberdi
21	DF	SRB	Mihailo Jovanović (to (Serbia) Inđija)
23	MF	SRB	Nemanja Subotić (to (Serbia) Radnički Niš)
29	FW	KAZ	Samat Sarsenov (loan return to (Kazakhstan) Kairat)
32	GK	KAZ	Samat Otarbayev (to (Kazakhstan) Kyran)
35	GK	KAZ	Timurbek Zakirov (loan return to (Kazakhstan) Kyzylzhar)
37	MF	KAZ	Pavel Shabalin
44	FW	TOG	Serge Nyuiadzi (to (Kazakhstan) Caspiy)
80	FW	BRA	Elivelto (to (Uzbekistan) Sogdiana Jizzakh)
87	DF	SRB	Aleksandar Simčević (to (Kazakhstan) Ordabasy)
88	MF	BRA	Gian (to (Kazakhstan) Okzhetpes)
99	FW	GEO	Elguja Lobjanidze (to (Kazakhstan) Kaisar)

=== Tobol ===
In: Note: Flags indicate national team as defined under FIFA eligibility rules; some limited exceptions apply. Players may hold more than one non-FIFA nationality.

No.	Pos.	Nation	Player
4	DF	ARM	Arman Hovhannisyan (from (Armenia) Gandzasar Kapan)
6	DF	NGA	Stephen Eze (from (Bulgaria) Lokomotiv Plovdiv)
8	DF	KAZ	Temirlan Yerlanov (from (Kazakhstan) Ordabasy)
11	MF	KAZ	Serikzhan Muzhikov (from (Kazakhstan) Astana)
15	FW	KAZ	Oralkhan Omirtayev (from (Kazakhstan) Shakhter Karagandy)
24	DF	MKD	Aleksa Amanović (from (Serbia) Javor Ivanjica)
26	DF	KAZ	Sagadat Tursynbay (from (Kazakhstan) Irtysh Pavlodar)
30	GK	KAZ	Igor Shatskiy (from (Kazakhstan) Shakhter Karagandy)
35	GK	KAZ	Aleksandr Mokin (from (Kazakhstan) Astana)
45	FW	KAZ	Roman Murtazayev (from (Kazakhstan) Astana)
70	MF	GEO	Luka Zarandia (loan from (Belgium) Zulte Waregem)
77	MF	ARM	Petros Avetisyan (from Ararat-Armenia)
—	DF	KAZ	Aleksandr Marochkin (from (Kazakhstan) Kaisar)
—	FW	KAZ	Aslanbek Kakimov (from (Kazakhstan) Aktobe)

Out: Note: Flags indicate national team as defined under FIFA eligibility rules; some limited exceptions apply. Players may hold more than one non-FIFA nationality.

No.	Pos.	Nation	Player
4	DF	CTA	Fernander Kassaï
8	DF	KAZ	Viktor Dmitrenko (to (Kazakhstan) Ordabasy)
12	GK	AZE	Emil Balayev (to (Azerbaijan) Zira)
15	FW	KAZ	Bauyrzhan Turysbek (to (Kazakhstan) Shakhter Karagandy)
16	GK	KAZ	Zhasur Narzikulov (to (Kazakhstan) Aktobe)
19	DF	KAZ	Grigori Sartakov (to (Kazakhstan) Irtysh Pavlodar)
24	DF	LTU	Vytautas Andriuškevičius (to (Kazakhstan) Kyzylzhar)
44	MF	LTU	Artūras Žulpa (to (Kazakhstan) Zhetysu)
69	MF	RUS	Nikita Bocharov
—	GK	KAZ	Andrey Pasechenko (released, previously on loan to (Kazakhstan) Irtysh Pavlodar)
—	DF	KAZ	Aleksandr Marochkin (loan to (Kazakhstan) Kaisar)
—	FW	KAZ	Aslanbek Kakimov (to (Kazakhstan) Aktobe)

=== Zhetysu ===
In: Note: Flags indicate national team as defined under FIFA eligibility rules; some limited exceptions apply. Players may hold more than one non-FIFA nationality.

No.	Pos.	Nation	Player
6	DF	BUL	Georgi Pashov (from Ararat-Armenia)
10	MF	KOS	Donjet Shkodra (from (Kazakhstan) Shakhter Karagandy)
11	FW	BLR	Vadim Pobudey (from (Belarus) Dnyapro Mogilev)
17	FW	BLR	Yahor Zubovich (from (Belarus) Dinamo Minsk)
22	DF	SRB	Stefan Živković (from (Greece) AEL)
31	DF	BLR	Andrey Zaleski (from (Belarus) Dinamo Minsk)
33	MF	POR	Pedro Eugénio (from (Bulgaria) Beroe Stara Zagora)
44	MF	LTU	Artūras Žulpa (from (Kazakhstan) Tobol)
—	DF	ARM	Hayk Ishkhanyan (from (Armenia) Alashkert)

Out: Note: Flags indicate national team as defined under FIFA eligibility rules; some limited exceptions apply. Players may hold more than one non-FIFA nationality.

No.	Pos.	Nation	Player
2	DF	KAZ	Maxim Chalkin
4	DF	RUS	Andrei Kharabara
5	MF	ARM	Kamo Hovhannisyan (to (Kazakhstan) Kairat)
10	MF	KGZ	Raul Jalilov (to (Kazakhstan) Kyzylzhar)
11	MF	KAZ	Sabyrkhan Ibraev
12	MF	KAZ	Yerkin Tapalov (to (Kazakhstan) Caspiy)
18	FW	KAZ	Rifat Nurmugamet (loan return to (Kazakhstan) Kairat)
25	GK	KAZ	Dmitry Kolbuntsov
27	FW	UKR	Ruslan Stepanyuk (to (Ukraine) Vorskla Poltava)
33	FW	MDA	Oleg Hromțov (to (Kazakhstan) Akzhayik)
88	MF	LTU	Mantas Kuklys (to (Lithuania) Žalgiris)
89	GK	KAZ	Nurlybek Ayazbaev
98	DF	KAZ	Ruan Orynbasar
—	DF	ARM	Hayk Ishkhanyan (to (Armenia) Alashkert)
—	MF	KAZ	Ablaykhan Makhambetov
