= 2019 FC Taraz season =

FC Taraz
2019 season
- Chairman: Sagat Yensegenuly
- Manager: Nurken Mazbayev
- Stadium: Central Stadium
- Premier League: 10th
- Kazakhstan Cup: Quarterfinal vs Ordabasy
- Top goalscorer: League: Two Players (8); All: Serge Nyuiadzi (9)
Home colours	Away colours

The 2019 FC Taraz season was the club's first season back in the Kazakhstan Premier League following their relegation at the end of the 2017 season, and 28th season in total. Taraz finished the season in 10th position, qualifying for a two-legged Relegation play-off against FC Akzhayik. After a 0-0 draw in the first leg away in Oral, Taraz won the second leg 3-1 to retain their place in the Kazakhstan Premier League for the 2020 season. Taraz also participated in the Kazakhstan Cup, where they were defeated by FC Ordabasy in the Quarterfinals.

== Squad ==
As of match played 18 November 2019

No.	Name	Nationality	Position	Date of birth (age)	Signed from	Signed in	Contract ends	Apps.	Goals
Goalkeepers
1	Almas Khamytbekov	(Kazakhstan)	GK	29 September 1991 (aged 28)	Makhtaaral	2018			
32	Samat Otarbayev	(Kazakhstan)	GK	18 February 1990 (aged 29)	Aktobe	2018			
35	Timurbek Zakirov	(Kazakhstan)	GK	1 March 1996 (aged 23)	Kyzylzhar	2019		1	0
74	Mukhammejan Seisen	(Kazakhstan)	GK	14 February 1999 (aged 20)	Youth Team	2018			
Defenders
4	Bekzat Shadmanov	(Kazakhstan)	DF	12 August 1997 (aged 22)	Youth Team	2017			
5	Rakhymzhan Rozybakiev	(Kazakhstan)	DF	2 January 1991 (aged 28)	Okzhetpes	2019		22	0
6	Lasha Kasradze	(Georgia (country))	DF	28 July 1989 (aged 30)	Zhetysu	2019		18	0
12	Igor Pikalkin	(Kazakhstan)	DF	19 March 1992 (aged 27)	Shakhter Karagandy	2019		25	0
14	Berik Aitbayev	(Kazakhstan)	DF	26 June 1991 (aged 28)	Irtysh Pavlodar	2018			
20	Maksat Amirkhanov	(Kazakhstan)	DF	10 February 1992 (aged 27)	Irtysh Pavlodar	2018			
21	Mihailo Jovanović	(Serbia)	DF	15 February 1989 (aged 30)	Neman Grodno	2019		15	0
22	Madiyar Nuraly	(Kazakhstan)	DF	20 January 1995 (aged 24)	Lashyn	2015			
46	Vladislav Scheirer	(Kazakhstan)	DF	14 June 2000 (aged 19)	Youth Team	2019		1	0
87	Aleksandar Simčević	(Serbia)	DF	15 February 1987 (aged 32)	Ordabasy	2019	2019	16	0
Midfielders
7	Abzal Taubay	(Kazakhstan)	MF	18 February 1995 (aged 24)	Youth Team	2015			
11	Gavril Kan	(Kazakhstan)	MF	10 January 1999 (aged 20)	Youth Team	2018			
13	Zhakyp Kozhamberdi	(Kazakhstan)	MF	26 February 1992 (aged 27)	Zhetysu	2019		102	8
17	Dinmukhamed Karaman	(Kazakhstan)	MF	26 June 2000 (aged 19)	Youth Team	2019		11	0
23	Nemanja Subotić	(Serbia)	MF	23 January 1992 (aged 27)	iClinic Sereď	2019		34	0
25	Sheykhislam Kulakhmetov	(Kazakhstan)	MF	15 January 1996 (aged 23)	Youth Team	2014			
37	Pavel Shabalin	(Kazakhstan)	MF	23 October 1988 (aged 31)	Irtysh Pavlodar	2019	2019	0	0
44	Serge Nyuiadzi	(Togo)	MF	17 September 1991 (aged 28)	Žalgiris	2019		30	9
88	Gian	(Brazil)	MF	2 April 1993 (aged 26)	Cruzeiro	2019		33	0
Forwards
9	Alisher Suley	(Kazakhstan)	FW	1 November 1995 (aged 24)	Ordabasy	2018			
19	Abylayhan Zhumabek	(Kazakhstan)	FW	19 October 2001 (aged 18)	Youth Team	2019		3	0
29	Samat Sarsenov	(Kazakhstan)	FW	19 August 1996 (aged 23)	loan from Kairat	2019	2019	13	1
80	Elivelto	(Brazil)	FW	2 January 1992 (aged 27)	RFS	2019		28	4
99	Elguja Lobjanidze	(Georgia (country))	FW	17 September 1992 (aged 27)	Rustavi	2019		25	8
Players away on loan
Left during the season
8	Bekzat Beisenov	(Kazakhstan)	MF	18 February 1988 (aged 31)	Ordabasy	2018			
10	Baūyrzhan Baytana	(Kazakhstan)	MF	6 May 1992 (aged 27)	Aktobe	2018			
18	Victor Kryukov	(Kazakhstan)	DF	30 June 1990 (aged 29)	Okzhetpes	2019		4	0

== Transfers ==
=== In ===
Date	Position	Nationality	Name	From	Fee	Ref.
Winter 2019	DF	(Kazakhstan)	Victor Kryukov	Okzhetpes	Undisclosed	
Winter 2019	DF	(Kazakhstan)	Igor Pikalkin	Shakhter Karagandy	Undisclosed	
Winter 2019	DF	(Kazakhstan)	Rakhymzhan Rozybakiev	Okzhetpes	Undisclosed	
Winter 2019	MF	(Brazil)	Gian	Cruzeiro	Undisclosed	
Winter 2019	MF	(Kazakhstan)	Zhakyp Kozhamberdi	Zhetysu	Undisclosed	
Winter 2019	MF	(Togo)	Serge Nyuiadzi	Žalgiris	Undisclosed	
28 January 2019	DF	(Georgia (country))	Lasha Kasradze	Zhetysu	Undisclosed	
28 January 2019	MF	(Serbia)	Nemanja Subotić	iClinic Sereď	Undisclosed	
28 January 2019	FW	(Brazil)	Elivelto	RFS	Undisclosed	
26 February 2019	FW	(Georgia (country))	Elguja Lobjanidze	Rustavi	Undisclosed	
24 July 2019	DF	(Serbia)	Aleksandar Simčević	Aktobe	Free	
24 July 2019	MF	(Kazakhstan)	Pavel Shabalin	Irtysh Pavlodar	Free	

=== Loans in ===
Date from	Position	Nationality	Name	From	Date to	Ref.
24 July 2019	FW	(Kazakhstan)	Samat Sarsenov	Samat Sarsenov	End of season	

=== Released ===
Date	Position	Nationality	Name	Joined	Date	Ref.
2 July 2019	MF	(Kazakhstan)	Baūyrzhan Baytana	Shakhter Karagandy	3 July 2019	
	DF	(Kazakhstan)	Victor Kryukov			
	MF	(Kazakhstan)	Bekzat Beisenov			
31 December 2019	GK	(Kazakhstan)	Samat Otarbayev	Kyran		
31 December 2019	DF	(Georgia (country))	Lasha Kasradze	Torpedo Kutaisi		
31 December 2019	DF	(Kazakhstan)	Rakhymzhan Rozybakiev	Caspiy	16 February 2020	
31 December 2019	DF	(Serbia)	Mihailo Jovanović	Inđija		
31 December 2019	DF	(Serbia)	Aleksandar Simčević	Ordabasy	11 February 2020	
31 December 2019	MF	(Brazil)	Gian	Okzhetpes	27 January 2020	
31 December 2019	MF	(Kazakhstan)	Zhakyp Kozhamberdi			
31 December 2019	MF	(Kazakhstan)	Pavel Shabalin			
31 December 2019	MF	(Serbia)	Nemanja Subotić	Radnički Niš		
31 December 2019	FW	(Brazil)	Elivelto	Sogdiana Jizzakh		
31 December 2019	FW	(Georgia (country))	Elguja Lobjanidze	Kaisar	13 January 2020	
31 December 2019	FW	(Togo)	Serge Nyuiadzi	Caspiy	11 February 2020	

== Competitions ==
=== Premier League ===
==== Results summary ====
Overall								Home						Away					
Pld	W	D	L	GF	GA	GD	Pts	W	D	L	GF	GA	GD	W	D	L	GF	GA	GD
33	6	9	18	28	60	−32	27	4	5	7	16	23	−7	2	4	11	12	37	−25

Last updated: 11 November 2019.
Source: See Results

==== Results by round ====
Round	1	2	3	4	5	6	7	8	9	10	11	12	13	14	15	16	17	18	19	20	21	22	23	24	25	26	27	28	29	30	31	32	33
Ground	A	A	H	A	H	H	A	H	A	H	A	H	A	H	A	A	H	A	H	A	H	H	H	A	H	A	H	A	A	H	A	H	A
Result	L	L	W	L	L	L	W	L	L	W	L	L	D	D	D	L	D	L	W	L	W	L	L	L	L	L	D	D	W	D	D	W	L
Position	8	11	8	9	10	11	9	10	10	9	9	10	10	10	10	10	11	11	11	11	9	9	9	9	10	10	10	10	10	10	10	10	10

Source: See Results
A = Away; H = Home; W = Win; D = Draw; L = Loss

==== Results ====
10 March 2019 1	Kairat	2 – 0	Taraz	Almaty
15:00 (UTC+6)	R.Nurmugamet 26' (yellow card) 51'; Eppel (yellow card) 27'; Abiken 67'	Report	Gian (yellow card) 42'; Elivelto (yellow card) 50'; M.Amirkhanov (yellow card) 54'; R.Rozybakiev (yellow card) 83'	Stadium: Central Stadium; Attendance: 5,500; Referee: Anatolyi Vishnichenko

15 March 2019 2	Tobol	4 – 1	Taraz	Kostanay
17:00 (UTC+6)	Kankava (yellow card) 6'; Nurgaliev 31' (pen.); Gordeichuk 62', 75'; Kassaï (yellow card) 78'; Turysbek 88'	Report	Elivelto (yellow card) 4'; B.Shadmanov (yellow card) 23'; R.Rozybakiev (yellow card) 34'; Lobjanidze 83' (pen.)	Stadium: Central Stadium; Attendance: 3,200; Referee: Grigory Moskovchenko

30 March 2019 3	Taraz	2 – 0	Atyrau	Taraz
16:00 (UTC+6)	Lobjanidze 70'; Nyuiadzi 77'	Report	D.Mazhitov (yellow card) 29'; Kubík (yellow card) 45+1'	Stadium: Central Stadium; Attendance: 5,000; Referee: Arman Ismuratov

6 April 2019 4	Irtysh Pavlodar	2 – 0	Taraz	Pavlodar
15:00 (UTC+6)	I.Pikalkin 18' (o.g.); S.Otarbayev 69' (o.g.); T.Muldinov (yellow card) 81'	Report	R.Rozybakiev (yellow card) 35' (yellow-red card) 39'	Stadium: Central Stadium; Attendance: 3,200; Referee: Georgiy Chekhovskiy

14 April 2019 5	Taraz	1 – 2	Kaisar	Taraz
16:00 (UTC+6)	Nyuiadzi 23'; M.Amirkhanov (yellow card) 75'	Report	Narzildaev (yellow card) 28'; Graf 43'; Punoševac 76'	Stadium: Central Stadium; Attendance: 4,000; Referee: Aydin Rakhimbayev

20 April 2019 6	Taraz	1 – 2	Shakhter Karagandy	Taraz
17:00 (UTC+6)	Gian (yellow card) 23'; M.Amirkhanov (yellow card) 29'; Nyuiadzi 37'; I.Pikalkin (yellow card) 50' (yellow-red card) 60'	Report	Baranovskyi 8'; Shakhmetov 34'; Tkachuk (yellow card) 54'; Kizito (yellow card) 70'; Shatskiy (yellow card) 88'	Stadium: Central Stadium; Attendance: 3,000; Referee: Zhandos Abzhan

27 April 2019 7	Aktobe	2 – 3	Taraz	Aktobe
18:00 (UTC+6)	Gian 51' (o.g.); Aimbetov 63'; B.Kairov (yellow card) 68' (yellow-red card) 90+3'; Volkov (red card) 88'	Report	Nyuiadzi 20'; A.Taubay 45'; V.Kryukov (yellow card) 49'; M.Amirkhanov (yellow card) 69'; Kasradze (yellow card) 85'; Lobjanidze 90+2'	Stadium: Central Stadium; Attendance: 11,000; Referee: Daniyar Sakhi

1 May 2019 8	Taraz	2 – 6	Okzhetpes	Taraz
17:00 (UTC+6)	Elivelto 19', 23'; I.Pikalkin (yellow card) 53' (yellow-red card) 66'; A.Taubay (yellow card) 61'; Gian (yellow card) 72'	Report	S.Otarbayev 14' (o.g.); I.Kalinin (yellow card) 20'; Zorić 30'; N.Dairov (yellow card) 51'; Kasmynin 62'; Stojanović 73' (pen.); A.Saparov 79' (yellow card) 82'; Kislitsyn 86'	Stadium: Central Stadium; Attendance: 4,000; Referee: Anatolyi Vishnichenko

5 May 2019 9	Zhetysu	1 – 0	Taraz	Taldıqorğan
17:00 (UTC+6)	E.Altynbekov 54'	Report		Stadium: Zhetysu Stadium; Attendance: 2,500; Referee: Denis Tevyashov

11 May 2019 10	Taraz	2 – 0	Astana	Taraz
16:00 (UTC+6)	D.Karaman (yellow card) 30'; Nyuiadzi 48' (pen.); A.Taubay (yellow card) 56'; Gian (yellow card) 72'; Lobjanidze 76'; M.Amirkhanov (yellow card) 89'	Report	Logvinenko (yellow card) 20'; Postnikov (yellow card) 80'	Stadium: Central Stadium; Attendance: 6,000; Referee: Bulat Saryev

18 May 2019 11	Ordabasy	3 – 0	Taraz	Shymkent
18:00 (UTC+6)	Zhangylyshbay 7' (yellow card) 66'; João Paulo 24'; Mahlangu 90'	Report	M.Amirkhanov (yellow card) 31'; Lobjanidze (yellow card) 71'	Stadium: Kazhymukan Munaitpasov Stadium; Attendance: 2,500; Referee: Denis Izmailov

26 May 2019 12	Taraz	0 – 1	Tobol	Taraz
16:00 (UTC+6)	A.Taubay (yellow card) 15'; B.Aitbayev (yellow card) 17'; I.Pikalkin (yellow card) 52'	Report	Nurgaliev (yellow card) 51'; Kankava (yellow card) 57'; A.Sherstov 80'	Stadium: Central Stadium; Attendance: 4,500; Referee: Sergey Gorokhovodatskiy

31 May 2019 13	Atyrau	1 – 1	Taraz	Kokshetau
15:00 (UTC+6)	Bjedov 81'; A.Shabaev (yellow card) 84'; A.Rodionov (yellow card) 89'	Report	Lobjanidze 66' (pen.); A.Taubay (yellow card) 90+4'	Stadium: Okzhetpes Stadium; Attendance: 200; Referee: Sergey Nozhenko

16 June 2019 14	Taraz	0 – 0	Irtysh Pavlodar	Taraz
17:00 (UTC+6)		Report	Vitas (yellow card) 35'; Paragulgov (yellow card) 48'	Stadium: Central Stadium; Attendance: 3,000; Referee: Arman Ismuratov

23 June 2019 15	Kaisar	1 – 1	Taraz	Kyzylorda
18:00 (UTC+6)	Mbombo 5'; Barseghyan (yellow card) 64'; I.Amirseitov (yellow card) 66'	Report	A.Taubay 30' (yellow card) 36'; M.Amirkhanov (yellow card) 58'; A.Suley (yellow card) 65' (yellow-red card) 90+7'	Stadium: Gani Muratbayev Stadium; Attendance: 3,000

30 June 2019 16	Shakhter Karagandy	1 – 0	Taraz	Karaganda
19:00 (UTC+6)	Shakhmetov (yellow card) 8'; Omirtayev 15'; Tkachuk (yellow card) 29'; Najaryan (yellow card) 63'	Report	M.Amirkhanov (yellow card) 51'; Elivelto (yellow card) 63'	Stadium: Shakhter Stadium; Attendance: 5,000; Referee: Bakhyt Kyzylbaev

6 July 2019 17	Taraz	1 – 1	Aktobe	Taraz
18:00 (UTC+6)	Nyuiadzi 45'; G.Kan (yellow card) 90+3'	Report	A.Kakimov 54' (pen.)	Stadium: Central Stadium; Attendance: 3,000; Referee: Timur Kumashev

14 July 2019 18	Okzhetpes	3 – 1	Taraz	Kokshetau
18:00 (UTC+6)	Moldakaraev (yellow card) 27' (yellow-red card) 82'; Stojanović 49' (pen.); A.Saparov (yellow card) 70'; Kasradze 76'; S.Zhumakhanov 80'	Report	R.Rozybakiev (yellow card) 9'; Nyuiadzi 35' (yellow card) 41'; A.Taubay (yellow card) 38'; Jovanović (red card) 41'; B.Shadmanov (yellow card) 72'	Stadium: Okzhetpes Stadium; Attendance: 1,700; Referee: Arman Ismuratov

21 July 2019 19	Taraz	2 – 0	Zhetysu	Taraz
19:30 (UTC+6)	R.Rozybakiev (yellow card) 18'; Elivelto 51' (pen.) (yellow card) 72' (yellow-red card) 90+2'; A.Taubay 90+4' (yellow card) 90+5'	Report	Naumov (yellow card) 90+2'	Stadium: Central Stadium; Attendance: 3,000; Referee: Daniyar Sakhi

28 July 2019 20	Astana	4 – 0	Taraz	Nur-Sultan
19:00 (UTC+6)	Janga (yellow card) 16' (goal) 33', 71'; Aničić (yellow card) 44'; Mubele 63'; Tomasov 88'	Report	Kasradze (yellow card) 42'	Stadium: Astana Arena; Attendance: 3,500; Referee: Zhandos Abzhan

4 August 2019 21	Taraz	1 – 0	Ordabasy	Taraz
19:30 (UTC+6)	Nyuiadzi 7'; Gian (yellow card) 17'; M.Amirkhanov (yellow card) 51'; Elivelto (yellow card) 69'	Report	Diakate (yellow card) 32' (yellow-red card) 42'; Erlanov (yellow card) 34'; Bystrov (yellow card) 45+2'	Stadium: Central Stadium; Attendance: 4,000; Referee: Sergey Gorokhovodatskiy

11 August 2019 22	Taraz	0 – 1	Kairat	Taraz
19:30 (UTC+6)	Subotić (yellow card) 48'; R.Rozybakiev (yellow card) 59'; M.Amirkhanov (yellow card) 75'; M.Nuraly (yellow card) 79'	Report	Palitsevich (yellow card) 25'; Eppel (yellow card) 59'; Eseola (yellow card) 60'; Kuat (yellow card) 69'; Islamkhan 84' (pen.)	Stadium: Central Stadium; Attendance: 6,500; Referee: Bolat Saryev

17 August 2019 23	Taraz	0 – 2	Kairat	Taraz
19:00 (UTC+6)	Simčević (yellow card) 35'	Report	Dugalić (yellow card) 14'; Mikanović (yellow card) 40'; Eseola (yellow card) 55' (goal) 59'; Islamkhan 71'	Stadium: Central Stadium; Attendance: 3,800; Referee: Denis Izmailov

25 August 2019 24	Astana	5 – 0	Taraz	Nur-Sultan
19:00 (UTC+6)	Janga 18'; D.Zhalmukan 57', 83'; Murtazayev 59'; Tomašević (red card) 67'; Tomasov 76'	Report	Nyuiadzi (red card) 67'; R.Rozybakiev (yellow card) 71'	Stadium: Astana Arena; Attendance: 1,500; Referee: Aleksandr Gauzer

31 August 2019 25	Taraz	0 – 5	Tobol	Taraz
18:00 (UTC+6)	Kasradze (yellow card) 2'; Subotić (yellow card) 41'; M.Amirkhanov (yellow card) 56'	Report	Nurgaliev 3' (pen.) (yellow card) 64'; Turysbek 12' (yellow card) 38'; Sebai 21', 76'; Miroshnichenko 90'	Stadium: Central Stadium; Attendance: 4,000; Referee: Furkat Atajanov

15 September 2019 26	Irtysh Pavlodar	1 – 0	Taraz	Pavlodar
18:00 (UTC+6)	Georgijević 12'	Report		Stadium: Central Stadium; Attendance: 3,800; Referee: Aydin Rakhimbayev

21 September 2019 27	Taraz	2 – 2	Atyrau	Taraz
18:00 (UTC+6)	Kozhamberdi (yellow card) 16'; M.Amirkhanov (yellow card) 49'; A.Suley 80'; R.Rozybakiev (yellow card) 81'; Lobjanidze 90+4'	Report	Ablitarov (yellow card) 56' (goal) 85'; Abdulavov 61'	Stadium: Central Stadium; Attendance: 2,800; Referee: Aleksandr Zatula

29 September 2019 28	Aktobe	1 – 1	Taraz	Aktobe
17:00 (UTC+6)	R.Temirkhan 47'; A.Tanzharikov (yellow card) 48'; A.Azhimov 84'	Report	A.Suley 38' (yellow card) 90+1'; Gian (yellow card) 41'; R.Rozybakiev (yellow card) 54'; B.Shadmanov (yellow card) 59'; Elivelto 64'	Stadium: Central Stadium; Attendance: 7,000; Referee: Artyom Kuchin

5 October 2019 29	Okzhetpes	2 – 3	Taraz	Kokshetau
15:00 (UTC+6)	Stojanović 20' (pen.); Alves 28'; N.Dairov (yellow card) 35'; Dmitrijev (yellow card) 42'; T.Zhakupov (yellow card) 71'	Report	A.Suley (yellow card) 37' (goal) 43'; Gian (yellow card) 47' (yellow-red card) 59'; M.Amirkhanov (yellow card) 62'; Jovanović (yellow card) 64'; Lobjanidze 66', 89'; A.Taubay (yellow card) 85'	Stadium: Okzhetpes Stadium; Attendance: 2,000; Referee: Sergey Gorokhovodatskiy

20 October 2019 30	Taraz	0 – 0	Shakhter Karagandy	Taraz
16:00 (UTC+6)	A.Suley (yellow card) 16'; M.Amirkhanov (yellow card) 64'; M.Nuraly (yellow card) 80'	Report	Vidović (yellow card) 68'	Stadium: Central Stadium; Attendance: 3,000; Referee: Ruslan Omarov

27 October 2019 31	Zhetysu	0 – 0	Taraz	Taldıqorğan
15:00 (UTC+6)	Darabayev (yellow card) 14'	Report	Gian (yellow card) 29'; Simčević (yellow card) 56'	Stadium: Zhetysu Stadium; Attendance: 2,000; Referee: Aleksandr Gauzer

3 November 2019 32	Taraz	2 – 1	Kaisar	Taraz
15:00 (UTC+6)	A.Suley 11'; B.Shadmanov 45+3' (pen.); R.Rozybakiev (yellow card) 46'; Lobjanidze (yellow card) 79'	Report	Bukia 30'; Lamanje (yellow card) 45+2'; Tagybergen (yellow card) 60'; Gorman (yellow card) 86'	Stadium: Central Stadium; Attendance: 3,500; Referee: Zhandos Abzhan

10 November 2019 33	Ordabasy	3 – 0	Taraz	Shymkent
15:00 (UTC+6)	João Paulo 5'; Diakate 53' (pen.); D.Dautov (yellow card) 74'; Shchotkin 80'	Report	Gian (yellow card) 39'; Sarsenov (yellow card) 74'	Stadium: Kazhymukan Munaitpasov Stadium; Attendance: 5,300; Referee: Bakhyt Kyzylbaev

==== League table ====
Pos	Team	Pld	W	D	L	GF	GA	GD	Pts	Qualification or relegation
8	Irtysh Pavlodar	33	11	4	18	30	45	−15	37	
9	Shakhter Karagandy	33	9	8	16	40	47	−7	35	
10	Taraz (O)	33	7	8	18	28	60	−32	29	Qualification for the relegation play-offs
11	Atyrau (R)	33	6	8	19	25	58	−33	26	Relegation to the Kazakhstan First Division
12	Aktobe (Note: Aktobe had six points deducted on 18 February 2019 as a punishment for unpaid debts to former player Dele Adeleye. On 14 March 2019, Aktobe were handed a further six point deduction for unpaid debts to former player Nemanja Nikolić.) (R)	33	7	6	20	35	75	−40	15	Relegation to the Kazakhstan First Division

Source: UEFA, Soccerway
Rules for classification: 1) Points; 2) Goal difference; 3) Matches won; 4) Goals scored; 5) Away goals scored; 6) Head-to-head points; 7) Head-to-head matches won; 8) Head-to-head goal difference; 9) Head-to-head goals scored; 10) Head-to-head away goals scored; 11) Draw.
(O) Play-off winners; (R) Relegated

==== Relegation play-off ====
15 November 2019 1st leg	Akzhayik	0 – 0	Taraz	Oral
15:00 (UTC+6)	R.Khairov (yellow card) 55'; Glavina (yellow card) 58'	Report	Sarsenov (yellow card) 27'; R.Rozybakiev (yellow card) 40'; I.Pikalkin (yellow card) 70'	Stadium: Petr Atoyan Stadium; Attendance: 2,500; Referee: Grigory Moskovchenko

18 November 2019 2nd leg	Taraz	3 – 1 (3 – 1 agg.)	Akzhayik	Taraz
15:00 (UTC+6)	Sarsenov 9' (yellow card) 45'; A.Taubay 14', 26' (yellow card) 30'; R.Rozybakiev (yellow card) 72'; A.Suley (yellow card) 82'; A.Nuraly (yellow card) 90'	Report	Simčević 28' (o.g.); Tazhimbetov (yellow card) 90'	Stadium: Central Stadium; Attendance: 1,500; Referee: Grigory Moskovchenko

=== Kazakhstan Cup ===
10 April 2019 Last 16	Taraz	2 – 0	Shakhter Karagandy	Taraz
18:00 (UTC+6)	G.Kan 8'; Nyuiadzi 90+1'	Report	Najaryan (yellow card) 34'; Skorykh (yellow card) 45'; Tkachuk (yellow card) 80'; Droppa (yellow card) 83'; Y.Tarasov (yellow card) 89'	Stadium: Central Stadium; Attendance: 4,000; Referee: Sergey Nozhenko

8 May 2019 Quarterfinal	Taraz	0 – 1	Ordabasy	Taraz
16:00 (UTC+6)	A.Suley (yellow card) 57'; Elivelto (yellow card) 80'; B.Beisenov (yellow card) 90+4'	Report	M.Vaganov 6'; Bystrov (yellow card) 59'	Stadium: Central Stadium; Attendance: 3,000; Referee: Timur Koumashev

== Squad statistics ==
As of match played 18 November 2019

=== Appearances and goals ===
No.	Pos	Nat	Player	Total		Premier League		Playoff		Kazakhstan Cup	
No.	Pos	Nat	Player	Apps	Goals	Apps	Goals	Apps	Goals	Apps	Goals
1	GK	(Kazakhstan) KAZ	Almas Khamytbekov	1	0	1	0	0	0	0	0
4	DF	(Kazakhstan) KAZ	Bekzat Shadmanov	32	1	24+6	1	2	0	0	0
5	DF	(Kazakhstan) KAZ	Rakhymzhan Rozybakiev	22	0	14+5	0	2	0	1	0
6	DF	(Georgia (country)) GEO	Lasha Kasradze	18	0	17	0	0	0	0+1	0
7	MF	(Kazakhstan) KAZ	Abzal Taubay	28	5	17+8	3	2	2	1	0
9	FW	(Kazakhstan) KAZ	Alisher Suley	30	4	18+8	4	2	0	2	0
11	MF	(Kazakhstan) KAZ	Gavril Kan	8	0	0+6	0	0	0	2	0
12	DF	(Kazakhstan) KAZ	Igor Pikalkin	25	0	17+4	0	2	0	2	0
13	MF	(Kazakhstan) KAZ	Zhakyp Kozhamberdi	23	0	13+6	0	1+1	0	1+1	0
14	DF	(Kazakhstan) KAZ	Berik Aitbayev	21	0	19+1	0	0	0	0+1	0
17	MF	(Kazakhstan) KAZ	Dinmukhamed Karaman	11	0	3+6	0	0+1	0	1	0
19	FW	(Kazakhstan) KAZ	Abylayhan Zhumabek	3	0	1+1	0	0	0	1	0
20	DF	(Kazakhstan) KAZ	Maksat Amirkhanov	29	0	27+1	0	0	0	1	0
21	DF	(Serbia) SRB	Mihailo Jovanović	15	0	12+1	0	1	0	1	0
22	DF	(Kazakhstan) KAZ	Madiyar Nuraly	16	0	2+10	0	1+1	0	2	0
23	MF	(Serbia) SRB	Nemanja Subotić	33	0	24+7	0	1	0	0+1	0
25	MF	(Kazakhstan) KAZ	Sheykhislam Kulakhmetov	1	0	0+1	0	0	0	0	0
29	FW	(Kazakhstan) KAZ	Samat Sarsenov	13	1	5+6	0	2	1	0	0
32	GK	(Kazakhstan) KAZ	Samat Otarbayev	16	0	14	0	2	0	0	0
35	GK	(Kazakhstan) KAZ	Timurbek Zakirov	1	0	1	0	0	0	0	0
44	MF	(Togo) TOG	Serge Nyuiadzi	29	9	23+3	8	1+1	0	1	1
46	DF	(Kazakhstan) KAZ	Vladislav Scheirer	1	0	0	0	0	0	1	0
74	GK	(Kazakhstan) KAZ	Mukhammejan Seisen	19	0	17	0	0	0	2	0
80	FW	(Brazil) BRA	Elivelto	28	4	23+4	4	0	0	0+1	0
87	DF	(Serbia) SRB	Aleksandar Simčević	16	0	14	0	2	0	0	0
88	MF	(Brazil) BRA	Gian	33	0	31	0	1+1	0	0	0
99	FW	(Georgia (country)) GEO	Elguja Lobjanidze	25	8	22+2	8	0	0	0+1	0
Players away from Taraz on loan:
Players who left Taraz during the season:
8	MF	(Kazakhstan) KAZ	Bekzat Beisenov	7	0	0+5	0	0	0	2	0
10	MF	(Kazakhstan) KAZ	Baūyrzhan Baytana	1	0	0	0	0	0	1	0
18	DF	(Kazakhstan) KAZ	Victor Kryukov	4	0	3+1	0	0	0	0	0

=== Goal scorers ===
Place	Position	Nation	Number	Name	Premier League	Playoff	Kazakhstan Cup	Total
1	MF	(Togo)	44	Serge Nyuiadzi	8	0	1	9
2	FW	(Georgia (country))	99	Elguja Lobjanidze	8	0	0	8
3	FW	(Kazakhstan)	9	Alisher Suley	4	2	0	6
4	FW	(Brazil)	80	Elivelto	4	0	0	4
5	MF	(Kazakhstan)	7	Abzal Taubay	3	0	0	3
6	DF	(Kazakhstan)	4	Bekzat Shadmanov	1	0	0	1
6	FW	(Kazakhstan)	29	Samat Sarsenov	0	1	0	1
6	MF	(Kazakhstan)	11	Gavril Kan	0	0	1	1
				TOTALS	28	3	2	33

=== Disciplinary record ===
Number	Nation	Position	Name	Premier League		Playoff		Kazakhstan Cup		Total	
Number	Nation	Position	Name	Yellow card	Red card	Yellow card	Red card	Yellow card	Red card	Yellow card	Red card
4	(Kazakhstan)	DF	Bekzat Shadmanov	3	0	0	0	0	0	3	0
5	(Kazakhstan)	DF	Rakhymzhan Rozybakiev	11	1	2	0	0	0	13	1
6	(Georgia (country))	DF	Lasha Kasradze	3	0	0	0	0	0	3	0
7	(Kazakhstan)	MF	Abzal Taubay	8	0	1	0	0	0	9	0
9	(Kazakhstan)	FW	Alisher Suley	5	1	1	0	1	0	7	1
11	(Kazakhstan)	MF	Gavril Kan	1	0	0	0	0	0	1	0
12	(Kazakhstan)	DF	Igor Pikalkin	5	2	1	0	0	0	6	2
13	(Kazakhstan)	MF	Zhakyp Kozhamberdi	1	0	0	0	0	0	1	0
14	(Kazakhstan)	DF	Berik Aitbayev	1	0	0	0	0	0	1	0
17	(Kazakhstan)	MF	Dinmukhamed Karaman	1	0	0	0	0	0	1	0
20	(Kazakhstan)	DF	Maksat Amirkhanov	14	0	0	0	0	0	14	0
21	(Serbia)	DF	Mihailo Jovanović	1	1	0	0	0	0	1	1
22	(Kazakhstan)	DF	Madiyar Nuraly	2	0	1	0	0	0	3	0
23	(Serbia)	MF	Nemanja Subotić	2	0	0	0	0	0	2	0
29	(Kazakhstan)	FW	Samat Sarsenov	1	0	2	0	0	0	3	0
44	(Togo)	MF	Serge Nyuiadzi	1	1	0	0	0	0	1	1
80	(Brazil)	FW	Elivelto	6	1	0	0	1	0	7	1
87	(Serbia)	DF	Aleksandar Simčević	2	0	0	0	0	0	2	0
88	(Brazil)	MF	Gian	10	1	0	0	0	0	10	1
99	(Georgia (country))	FW	Elguja Lobjanidze	2	0	0	0	0	0	2	0
Players who left Taraz during the season:
8	(Kazakhstan)	MF	Bekzat Beisenov	0	0	0	0	1	0	1	0
18	(Kazakhstan)	DF	Victor Kryukov	1	0	0	0	0	0	1	0
			TOTALS	81	8	8	0	3	0	92	8
