= 2019 FC Aktobe season =

FC Aktobe
2019 season
- Chairman: Sagat Yensegenuly
- Manager: Aleksandr Sednyov
- Stadium: Central Stadium
- Premier League: 12th (relegated)
- Kazakhstan Cup: Round of 16 vs Irtysh Pavlodar
- Top goalscorer: League: Abat Aimbetov (16); All: Abat Aimbetov (18)
Home colours	Away colours

The 2018 FC Aktobe season was the 25th successive season that the club playing in the Kazakhstan Premier League, the highest tier of association football in Kazakhstan. Aktobe finished the season in 12th and were relegated from the Premier League for the first time. In the Kazakhstan Cup, they were knocked out by Irtysh Pavlodar at the Last 16 stage.

== Season events ==
On 9 January, Aleksandr Sednyov was appointed as the club's manager.

On 18 February, Aktobe were deducted 6-points by the Football Federation of Kazakhstan due to debts owed to former player Dele Adeleye. On 14 March, Aktobe were handed a further six point deduction for unpaid debts to former player Nemanja Nikolić.

=== New Contracts ===
On 3 January, Marcos Pizzelli extended his contract with Aktobe until the end of 2019.

On 4 January, Saša Marjanović extended his contract with Aktobe until the end of 2019.

On 9 January, Aslanbek Kakimov extended his contract with Aktobe until the end of 2019.

On 11 January, Vitali Volkov extended his contract with Aktobe until the end of 2019.

On 25 January, Milan Radin extended his contract with Aktobe until the end of 2019.

On 30 January, Hrvoje Miličević extended his contract with Aktobe until the end of 2019.

== Squad ==
As of match played 10 November 2019

No.	Name	Nationality	Position	Date of birth (age)	Signed from	Signed in	Contract ends	Apps.	Goals
Goalkeepers
13	Ramil Nurmukhametov	(Kazakhstan)	GK	21 December 1987 (age 38)	Youth Team	2018		32	0
32	Mukhambet Tamabay	(Kazakhstan)	GK	28 July 1996 (age 30)	Youth Team	2016		3	0
42	Igor Trofimets	(Kazakhstan)	GK	20 August 1996 (age 30)	Youth Team	2016		36	0
Defenders
5	Bagdat Kairov	(Kazakhstan)	DF	27 April 1993 (age 33)	Youth Team	2016		109	2
6	Rustam Temirkhan	(Kazakhstan)	DF	10 August 1997 (age 29)	Youth Team	2018		28	1
17	Esen Zhasanov	(Kazakhstan)	DF	24 April 1998 (age 28)	Youth Team	2019		29	1
18	Rustam Uksumbaev	(Kazakhstan)	DF	18 January 1996 (age 30)	Youth Team	2018		5	0
25	Sayat Zhumagali	(Kazakhstan)	DF	25 April 1995 (age 31)	Youth Team	2014		48	1
Midfielders
2	Adilkhan Tanzharikov	(Kazakhstan)	MF	25 November 1996 (age 29)	Zhetysu	2018		33	0
12	Alisher Azhimov	(Kazakhstan)	MF	29 May 2001 (age 25)	Youth Team	2019		30	2
19	Ardak Saulet	(Kazakhstan)	MF	25 November 1996 (age 29)	Astana	2017		45	3
20	Nurbolat Batyrkhanov	(Kazakhstan)	MF	11 February 1998 (age 28)	Youth Team	2019		8	0
22	Vitali Volkov	(Russia)	MF	22 March 1981 (age 45)	Okzhetpes	2018	2019	57	1
23	Hrvoje Miličević	(Croatia)	MF	30 April 1993 (age 33)	Pescara	2018	2019	41	4
47	Aslanbek Kakimov	(Kazakhstan)	MF	2 October 1993 (age 33)	Youth Team	2016	2019	95	9
72	Abilkhan Abdukarimov	(Kazakhstan)	MF	7 April 1998 (age 28)	Youth Team	2016		8	0
77	Zhambyl Kukeyev	(Kazakhstan)	MF	20 September 1988 (age 38)	Kaisar	2018		49	2
86	Oleksandr Kitsak	(Ukraine)	MF	23 June 1996 (age 30)		2019		17	1
88	Anton Shurigin	(Kazakhstan)	MF	3 December 1988 (age 37)	Kaisar	2017		62	1
Forwards
10	Marcos Pizzelli	(Armenia)	FW	3 October 1984 (age 42)	Al-Shabab	2018	2019	107	36
28	Rustam Sakhibov	(Kazakhstan)	FW	28 April 1996 (age 30)		2019		24	0
83	Maksim Samorodov	(Kazakhstan)	FW	29 June 2002 (age 24)	Youth Team	2019		3	0
95	Abat Aimbetov	(Kazakhstan)	FW	7 August 1995 (age 31)	Youth Team	2012		124	25
96	Ulykbek Syrlybayev	(Kazakhstan)	FW	30 June 1996 (age 30)		2019		2	0
Players away on loan
Left during the season
11	Saša Marjanović	(Serbia)	MF	13 November 1987 (age 38)	Partizan	2018	2019	39	3
24	Milan Radin	(Serbia)	MF	25 June 1991 (age 35)	Partizan	2018	2019	42	5
87	Aleksandar Simčević	(Serbia)	MF	15 February 1987 (age 39)	Ordabasy	2019		29	2

== Transfers ==
=== In ===
Date	Position	Nationality	Name	From	Fee	Ref.
Winter 2019	DF	(Serbia)	Aleksandar Simčević	Ordabasy	Undisclosed	
Summer 2019	MF	(Ukraine)	Oleksandr Kitsak		Free	

=== Out ===
Date	Position	Nationality	Name	To	Fee	Ref.
19 December 2018	FW	(Brazil)	Reynaldo	Qarabağ	Undisclosed	
27 December 2018	MF	(Kazakhstan)	Ruslan Valiullin	Tobol	Undisclosed	

=== Released ===
Date	Position	Nationality	Name	Joined	Date	Ref.
Summer 2019	DF	(Serbia)	Aleksandar Simčević	Taraz	24 July 2019	
Summer 2019	MF	(Serbia)	Saša Marjanović	Nea Salamis Famagusta	Summer 2019	
Summer 2019	MF	(Serbia)	Milan Radin	Korona Kielce	26 June 2019	

=== Trial ===
Date From	Date To	Position	Nationality	Name	Last club	Ref.
11 January 2019		MF	(Kazakhstan)	Valeri Korobkin	Kaisar	
13 January 2019		MF	(Kazakhstan)	Kirill Shestakov	Irtysh Pavlodar	
2 February 2019		MF	(Poland)	Patryk Małecki	Wisła Kraków	
7 February 2019		MF	(Guinea)	Ibrahima Conté	KV Oostende	
9 February 2019		MF	(Ghana)	Amos Addai	Ashanti Gold	

== Friendlies ==
16 January 2019	Aktobe (Kazakhstan)	1 – 3	(Romania) Sepsi Sfântu Gheorghe	Belek, Turkey
19:00 (UTC+6)	Goal	Report	Goal

20 January 2019	Aktobe (Kazakhstan)	2 – 2	(Bulgaria) Septemvri Sofia	Belek, Turkey
(UTC+6)	Goal	Report	Goal

23 January 2019	Aktobe (Kazakhstan)	1 – 1	(Hungary) Siófok	Belek, Turkey
(UTC+6)	Goal	Report	Goal

4 February 2019	Aktobe (Kazakhstan)	1 – 1	(Armenia) Alashkert	Belek, Turkey
(UTC+6)	Goal	Report	Goal

6 February 2019	Aktobe (Kazakhstan)	2 – 2	(Russia) Spartak Moscow	Belek, Turkey
(UTC+6)	Małecki 26', 33'	Report	Glushenkov 17', 37'

9 February 2019	Aktobe (Kazakhstan)	1 – 3	(Ukraine) Mariupol	Belek, Turkey
(UTC+6)	Goal	Report	Goal

== Competitions ==
=== Premier League ===
==== Results summary ====
Overall								Home						Away					
Pld	W	D	L	GF	GA	GD	Pts	W	D	L	GF	GA	GD	W	D	L	GF	GA	GD
33	7	6	20	34	74	−40	27	4	3	9	22	31	−9	3	3	11	12	43	−31

Last updated: 10 November 2019.
Source: See Results

==== Results by round ====
Round	1	2	3	4	5	6	7	8	9	10	11	12	13	14	15	16	17	18	19	20	21	22	23	24	25	26	27	28	29	30	31	32	33
Ground	A	A	H	A	H	A	H	A	H	H	A	H	A	H	A	H	A	H	A	A	H	H	A	H	A	H	A	H	A	H	A	H	A
Result	L	L	L	L	W	W	L	L	L	L	D	L	L	L	D	W	D	D	W	L	L	L	L	D	W	W	L	D	L	L	L	W	L
Position	12	12	12	12	12	12	12	12	12	12	12	12	12	12	12	12	12	12	12	12	12	12	12	12	12	12	12	12	12	12	12	12	12

Source: See Results
A = Away; H = Home; W = Win; D = Draw; L = Loss

==== Results ====
11 March 2019 1	Astana	4 – 1	Aktobe	Astana
19:00 (UTC+6)	Tomasov 20', 39'; Logvinenko 34' (yellow card) 90+3'; Pertsukh 90+4'	Report	Aimbetov 3' (yellow card) 55'; S.Zhumagali (yellow card) 18'; A.Shurigin (yellow card) 66'	Stadium: Astana Arena; Attendance: 10,000; Referee: Artyom Kuchin

15 March 2019 2	Ordabasy	1 – 0	Aktobe	Shymkent
15:00 (UTC+6)	Mehanović (yellow card) 20' (yellow-red card) 88'; Shchotkin 85' (yellow card) 86'	Report	Kukeyev (yellow card) 28'; A.Tanzharikov (yellow card) 64'; A.Azhimov (yellow card) 83'	Stadium: Kazhymukan Munaitpasov Stadium; Attendance: 3,000; Referee: Aleksandr Aliyev

31 March 2019 3	Aktobe	1 – 3	Kairat	Kostanay
14:00 (UTC+6)	A.Tanzharikov (yellow card) 43'; A.Shurigin 72'	Report	Wrzesiński 12' (yellow card) 31'; Mikanović 35'; Eseola 45+3'; S.Keyler (yellow card) 55'; Dugalić (yellow card) 82'; R.Orazov (yellow card) 85'; Sarsenov (yellow card) 89'	Stadium: Central Stadium; Attendance: 1,000; Referee: Zhandos Abzhan

6 April 2019 4	Tobol	2 – 1	Aktobe	Kostanay
15:00 (UTC+6)	Miroshnichenko (yellow card) 31'; Nurgaliev 34' (pen.); Sebai (yellow card) 58'; Fedin 81'	Report	A.Tanzharikov (yellow card) 13'; Radin (yellow card) 19'; B.Kairov (yellow card) 65'; E.Zhasanov 89'	Stadium: Central Stadium; Attendance: 3,000; Referee: Artyom Kuchin

14 April 2019 5	Aktobe	2 – 0	Atyrau	Kostanay
15:00 (UTC+6)	Radin 3'; Marjanović (yellow card) 21'; Miličević 45'; A.Tanzharikov (yellow card) 78'	Report	Kubík (yellow card) 2'; Ablitarov 67'	Stadium: Central Stadium; Attendance: 200; Referee: Sergey Gorokhovodatskiy

20 April 2019 6	Irtysh Pavlodar	0 – 1	Aktobe	Pavlodar
17:00 (UTC+6)	R.Aslan (yellow card) 31'; Darabayev (yellow card) 60'; Fonseca (yellow card) 64'	Report	Aimbetov 12'; A.Kakimov (yellow card) 35'; I.Trofimets (yellow card) 82'	Stadium: Central Stadium; Attendance: 2,500; Referee: Saken Bayimbet

27 April 2019 7	Aktobe	2 – 3	Taraz	Aktobe
18:00 (UTC+6)	Gian 51' (o.g.); Aimbetov 63'; B.Kairov (yellow card) 68' (yellow-red card) 90+3'; Volkov (red card) 88'	Report	Nyuiadzi 20'; A.Taubay 45'; V.Kryukov (yellow card) 49'; M.Amirkhanov (yellow card) 69'; Kasradze (yellow card) 85'; Lobjanidze 90+2'	Stadium: Central Stadium; Attendance: 11,000; Referee: Daniyar Sakhi

1 May 2019 8	Shakhter Karagandy	3 – 0	Aktobe	Nur-Sultan
15:00 (UTC+6)	Tkachuk (yellow card) 13'; Zenjov (yellow card) 44' (goal) 75'; Omirtayev (yellow card) 61' (goal) 68'; Pešić 90+3'	Report	A.Tanzharikov (yellow card) 50'	Stadium: Astana Arena; Attendance: 500; Referee: Aleksandr Zatula

5 May 2019 9	Aktobe	1 – 3	Kaisar	Aktobe
19:00 (UTC+6)	Aimbetov 43'; Volkov (yellow card) 47'; A.Shurigin (yellow card) 90+2'; Marjanović (yellow card) 90+5'; A.Azhimov (yellow card) 90+5'	Report	A.Marochkin 5'; Tagybergen 41'; Barseghyan 44'; S.Abzalov (yellow card) 90'; Grigorenko (yellow card) 90+5'	Stadium: Central Stadium; Attendance: 9,000; Referee: Sergey Nozhenko

12 May 2019 10	Aktobe	0 – 2	Okzhetpes	Aktobe
19:00 (UTC+6)	A.Shurigin (yellow card) 29'; A.Saulet (yellow card) 69'; A.Tanzharikov (red card) 77'	Report	Kukeyev 33' (o.g.); Dmitrijev (yellow card) 49' (goal) 53'; A.Saparov (yellow card) 82'	Stadium: Central Stadium; Attendance: 7,500; Referee: Furkat Atajanov

18 May 2019 11	Zhetysu	1 – 1	Aktobe	Taldıqorğan
17:30 (UTC+6)	Zhaksylykov 44'; A.Shabanov (yellow card) 54'	Report	A.Shurigin (yellow card) 45+1'; Aimbetov 76'	Stadium: Zhetysu Stadium; Attendance: 2,000; Referee: Grigory Moskovchenko

26 May 2019 12	Aktobe	0 – 3	Ordabasy	Aktobe
20:00 (UTC+6)	R.Sakhibov (yellow card) 43'; B.Kairov (yellow card) 71'	Report	João Paulo 7', 18'; Diakate 68'	Stadium: Central Stadium; Attendance: 7,000; Referee: Bagdat Abdullaev

31 May 2019 13	Kairat	3 – 0	Aktobe	Almaty
19:00 (UTC+6)	Eseola (yellow card) 52' (goal) 60', 73'; Kuat (yellow card) 55'; Eppel 89'	Report		Stadium: Central Stadium; Attendance: 7,800; Referee: Georgiy Chekhovskiy

15 June 2019 14	Aktobe	0 – 1	Tobol	Aktobe
20:00 (UTC+6)	Radin (yellow card) 40'	Report	Turysbek 75'	Stadium: Central Stadium; Attendance: 7,000; Referee: Saken Bayimbet

23 June 2019 15	Atyrau	1 – 1	Aktobe	Atyrau
20:00 (UTC+6)	A.Makuov (yellow card) 39'; K.Kalmuratov 44'	Report	A.Saulet 18'; I.Trofimets (yellow card) 90+1'; Kukeyev (yellow card) 90+3'	Stadium: Munaishy Stadium; Attendance: 4,500; Referee: Aleksandr Zatula

30 June 2019 16	Aktobe	2 – 1	Irtysh Pavlodar	Aktobe
20:00 (UTC+6)	R.Temirkhan (yellow card) 57'; A.Kakimov 68'; B.Kairov (yellow card) 69'; Volkov 83'	Report	T.Muldinov 10'; Fonseca (yellow card) 64'	Stadium: Central Stadium; Attendance: 7,000; Referee: Daniyar Sakhi

6 July 2019 17	Taraz	1 – 1	Aktobe	Taraz
18:00 (UTC+6)	Nyuiadzi 45'; G.Kan (yellow card) 90+3'	Report	A.Kakimov 54' (pen.)	Stadium: Central Stadium; Attendance: 3,000; Referee: Timur Kumashev

13 July 2019 18	Aktobe	2 – 2	Shakhter Karagandy	Aktobe
21:00 (UTC+6)	A.Kakimov 64'; Aimbetov 70'; A.Tanzharikov (yellow card) 73'	Report	Tkachuk (yellow card) 10'; Shkodra (yellow card) 15'; Zenjov 30'; Pešić 38'; Shakhmetov (yellow card) 53'; Kizito (yellow card) 73'	Stadium: Central Stadium; Attendance: 8,000; Referee: Furkat Atajanov

20 July 2019 19	Kaisar	0 – 1	Aktobe	Kyzylorda
21:00 (UTC+6)		Report	A.Kakimov (yellow card) 39'; A.Saulet 41'; A.Tanzharikov (yellow card) 75'; U.Syrlybayev (yellow card) 90+5'	Stadium: Gani Muratbayev Stadium; Attendance: 6,500; Referee: Anatolyi Vishnichenko

27 July 2019 20	Okzhetpes	4 – 0	Aktobe	Kokshetau
18:00 (UTC+6)	Dmitrijev 8' (yellow card) 90+2'; Moldakaraev 54', 76'; Alves (yellow card) 77'; Bobko (yellow card) 79'; Zorić 83' (pen.) (yellow card) 84'; N.Dairov (yellow card) 90+3'	Report	O.Kitsak (yellow card) 38'; E.Zhasanov (yellow card) 51'	Stadium: Okzhetpes Stadium; Attendance: 1,600; Referee: Bolat Saryev

3 August 2019 21	Aktobe	1 – 2	Zhetysu	Aktobe
20:00 (UTC+6)	Aimbetov 90+3'	Report	Stepanyuk 10'; Toshev 53'	Stadium: Central Stadium; Attendance: 10,000; Referee: Bagdat Abdullaev

11 August 2019 22	Aktobe	2 – 3	Astana	Aktobe
20:00 (UTC+6)	Aimbetov 56', 84' (yellow card) 84'; A.Tanzharikov (yellow card) 63'	Report	Mayewski 8'; Sigurjónsson 53'; Murtazayev 86'	Stadium: Central Stadium; Attendance: 11,500; Referee: Artyom Kuchin

18 August 2019 23	Zhetysu	5 – 0	Aktobe	Taldıqorğan
18:00 (UTC+6)	Zhaksylykov 11', 65'; Hovhannisyan 30'; Kuklys 71' (pen.); Naumov 80'	Report		Stadium: Zhetysu Stadium; Attendance: 3,000; Referee: Denis Tevyashov

25 August 2019 24	Aktobe	1 – 1	Irtysh Pavlodar	Aktobe
20:00 (UTC+6)	Volkov (yellow card) 29'; O.Kitsak (yellow card) 38'; Aimbetov 85'	Report	A.Sokolenko (yellow card) 4'; Fonseca (yellow card) 45+3'; D.Shmidt (yellow card) 55'; Stanojević 63' (yellow card) 88'; Stamenković (yellow card) 90+3'	Stadium: Central Stadium; Attendance: 7,000; Referee: Arman Ismuratov

31 August 2019 25	Kaisar	1 – 3	Aktobe	Kyzylorda
19:00 (UTC+6)	Marochkin (red card) 21'; Bitang (yellow card) 34'; Barseghyan (yellow card) 42' (goal) 85'; Tagybergen (yellow card) 44'	Report	Aimbetov 17', 63', 78'; R.Sakhibov (yellow card) 27'; A.Tanzharikov (yellow card) 56'	Stadium: Gani Muratbayev Stadium; Attendance: 2,500; Referee: Georgiy Chekhovskiy

15 September 2019 26	Aktobe	3 – 2	Atyrau	Aktobe
19:00 (UTC+6)	Aimbetov 23' (pen.); Pizzelli 65'; A.Kakimov 90+1'	Report	M.Gabyshev (yellow card) 22'; Sergienko 37'; Abdulavov 45+1' (yellow card) 50'; A.Rodionov (yellow card) 90+1'	Stadium: Central Stadium; Attendance: 10,000; Referee: Anatolyi Vishnichenko

22 September 2019 27	Ordabasy	4 – 1	Aktobe	Shymkent
18:00 (UTC+6)	Shchotkin 15'; Dosmagambetov 44'; Yerlanov 71'; M.Tolebek (yellow card) 83'; Kovalchuk 90'	Report	A.Azhimov 65'	Stadium: Kazhymukan Munaitpasov Stadium; Attendance: 3,200; Referee: Askhat Abdanbayev

29 September 2019 28	Aktobe	2 – 2	Taraz	Aktobe
17:00 (UTC+6)	R.Temirkhan 47'; A.Tanzharikov (yellow card) 48'; A.Azhimov 84'	Report	A.Suley 38' (yellow card) 90+1'; Gian (yellow card) 41'; R.Rozybakiev (yellow card) 54'; B.Shadmanov (yellow card) 59'; Elivelto 64'	Stadium: Central Stadium; Attendance: 7,000; Referee: Artyom Kuchin

5 October 2019 29	Kairat	6 – 0	Aktobe	Almaty
17:00 (UTC+6)	Wrzesiński 4'; Eppel 6', 69' (yellow card) 86'; Zhukov (yellow card) 29'; Suyumbayev 54'; Eseola 58'; Islamkhan 60'	Report	A.Tanzharikov (yellow card) 15'; A.Azhimov (yellow card) 38'	Stadium: Central Stadium; Attendance: 7,500; Referee: Askhat Abdanbayev

20 October 2019 30	Aktobe	1 – 2	Okzhetpes	Aktobe
17:00 (UTC+6)	Pizzelli 38'; O.Kitsak (yellow card) 47'; R.Temirkhan (yellow card) 69'	Report	Alves 34'; Dmitrijev 48'; Dimov (yellow card) 86'; Moldakaraev (yellow card) 88'; T.Zhakupov (yellow card) 90+4'	Stadium: Central Stadium; Attendance: 6,000; Referee: Aydin Rakhimbayev

27 October 2019 31	Astana	5 – 0	Aktobe	Nur-Sultan
20:00 (UTC+6)	Pertsukh (yellow card) 19'; Tomasov 22', 45', 49', 55'; Muzhikov 90'	Report		Stadium: Astana Arena; Attendance: 2,400; Referee: Daniyar Sakhi

3 November 2019 32	Aktobe	3 – 2	Shakhter Karagandy	Aktobe
15:00 (UTC+6)	O.Kitsak 29'; Aimbetov 35' (pen.), 64'; E.Zhasanov (yellow card) 45'	Report	J.Payruz (yellow card) 33'; Pešić 46'; Shkodra (yellow card) 56'; Reginaldo 58'	Stadium: Central Stadium; Attendance: 5,000; Referee: Saken Bayimbet

10 November 2019 33	Tobol	2 – 1	Aktobe	Kostanay
15:00 (UTC+6)	Sebai 30' (yellow card) 62'; Turysbek 58'; S.Zharynbetov (yellow card) 73'; Dmitrenko (yellow card) 83'	Report	A.Saulet 39' (yellow card) 60'; A.Shurigin (yellow card) 43'; Volkov (yellow card) 52'; E.Zhasanov (yellow card) 83'	Stadium: Tobol Arena; Attendance: 2,000; Referee: Aydin Rakhimbayev

==== League table ====
Pos	Team	Pld	W	D	L	GF	GA	GD	Pts	Qualification or relegation
8	Irtysh Pavlodar	33	11	4	18	30	45	−15	37	
9	Shakhter Karagandy	33	9	8	16	40	47	−7	35	
10	Taraz (O)	33	7	8	18	28	60	−32	29	Qualification for the relegation play-offs
11	Atyrau (R)	33	6	8	19	25	58	−33	26	Relegation to the Kazakhstan First Division
12	Aktobe (Note: Aktobe had six points deducted on 18 February 2019 as a punishment for unpaid debts to former player Dele Adeleye. On 14 March 2019, Aktobe were handed a further six point deduction for unpaid debts to former player Nemanja Nikolić.) (R)	33	7	6	20	35	75	−40	15	Relegation to the Kazakhstan First Division

Source: UEFA, Soccerway
Rules for classification: 1) Points; 2) Goal difference; 3) Matches won; 4) Goals scored; 5) Away goals scored; 6) Head-to-head points; 7) Head-to-head matches won; 8) Head-to-head goal difference; 9) Head-to-head goals scored; 10) Head-to-head away goals scored; 11) Draw.
(O) Play-off winners; (R) Relegated

=== Kazakhstan Cup ===
10 April 2019 Last 16	Aktobe	3 – 3 (a.e.t.) (1 – 3 p)	Irtysh Pavlodar	Kostanay
14:00 (UTC+6)	Aimbetov 27', 64'; B.Kairov (yellow card) 32'; Miličević (yellow card) 56' (goal) 111'; Volkov (yellow card) 75'; Radin (yellow card) 99'	Report	Cañas 17'; Lunin 51'; Dubra 105'	Stadium: Central Stadium; Attendance: 500; Referee: Anatoly Vishnichenko
	Penalties
	Miličević (penalty scored); Aimbetov (penalty missed); Volkov (penalty missed); Radin (penalty missed)		(penalty scored) Cañas; (penalty scored) Vitas; (penalty scored) Fonseca; (penalty missed) A.Popov
Note: Match played at Tobol's Central Stadium in Kostanay, instead of Aktobes regular Central Stadium in Aktobe.

== Squad statistics ==
As of match played 10 November 2019

=== Appearances and goals ===
No.	Pos	Nat	Player	Total		Premier League		Kazakhstan Cup	
No.	Pos	Nat	Player	Apps	Goals	Apps	Goals	Apps	Goals
2	MF	(Kazakhstan) KAZ	Adilkhan Tanzharikov	31	0	30	0	1	0
5	DF	(Kazakhstan) KAZ	Bagdat Kairov	30	0	29	0	1	0
6	DF	(Kazakhstan) KAZ	Rustam Temirkhan	25	1	20+4	1	0+1	0
10	FW	(Armenia) ARM	Marcos Pizzelli	11	2	9+2	2	0	0
12	MF	(Kazakhstan) KAZ	Alisher Azhimov	30	2	16+13	2	0+1	0
13	GK	(Kazakhstan) KAZ	Ramil Nurmukhametov	14	0	14	0	0	0
17	DF	(Kazakhstan) KAZ	Esen Zhasanov	29	1	21+7	1	0+1	0
18	DF	(Kazakhstan) KAZ	Rustam Uksumbaev	5	0	0+5	0	0	0
19	MF	(Kazakhstan) KAZ	Ardak Saulet	32	3	25+6	3	1	0
20	MF	(Kazakhstan) KAZ	Nurbolat Batyrkhanov	8	0	1+6	0	1	0
22	DF	(Russia) RUS	Vitali Volkov	33	1	32	1	1	0
23	MF	(Croatia) CRO	Hrvoje Miličević	9	2	8	1	1	1
25	DF	(Kazakhstan) KAZ	Sayat Zhumagali	14	0	10+4	0	0	0
28	FW	(Kazakhstan) KAZ	Rustam Sakhibov	22	0	6+16	0	0	0
32	GK	(Kazakhstan) KAZ	Mukhambet Tamabay	3	0	3	0	0	0
42	GK	(Kazakhstan) KAZ	Igor Trofimets	18	0	16+1	0	1	0
47	MF	(Kazakhstan) KAZ	Aslanbek Kakimov	34	4	27+6	4	1	0
72	MF	(Kazakhstan) KAZ	Abilkhan Abdukarimov	2	0	0+2	0	0	0
77	MF	(Kazakhstan) KAZ	Zhambyl Kukeyev	24	0	17+7	0	0	0
83	FW	(Kazakhstan) KAZ	Maksim Samorodov	3	0	0+3	0	0	0
86	MF	(Ukraine) UKR	Oleksandr Kitsak	17	1	17	1	0	0
88	MF	(Kazakhstan) KAZ	Anton Shurigin	18	1	10+7	1	1	0
95	FW	(Kazakhstan) KAZ	Abat Aimbetov	30	18	28+1	16	1	2
96	FW	(Kazakhstan) KAZ	Ulykbek Syrlybayev	2	0	0+2	0	0	0
Players away from Aktobe on loan:
Players who left Aktobe during the season:
11	MF	(Serbia) SRB	Saša Marjanović	15	0	15	0	0	0
24	DF	(Serbia) SRB	Milan Radin	12	1	10+1	1	1	0

=== Goal scorers ===
Place	Position	Nation	Number	Name	Premier League	Kazakhstan Cup	Total
1	FW	(Kazakhstan)	95	Abat Aimbetov	16	2	18
2	MF	(Kazakhstan)	47	Aslanbek Kakimov	4	0	4
3	MF	(Kazakhstan)	19	Ardak Saulet	3	0	3
4	MF	(Kazakhstan)	12	Alisher Azhimov	2	0	2
4	FW	(Armenia)	10	Marcos Pizzelli	2	0	2
4	MF	(Croatia)	23	Hrvoje Miličević	1	1	2
7	MF	(Kazakhstan)	88	Anton Shurigin	1	0	1
7	DF	(Kazakhstan)	17	Esen Zhasanov	1	0	1
7	MF	(Serbia)	24	Milan Radin	1	0	1
7	DF	(Russia)	22	Vitali Volkov	1	0	1
7	DF	(Kazakhstan)	6	Rustam Temirkhan	1	0	1
7	MF	(Ukraine)	86	Oleksandr Kitsak	1	0	1
7				Own goal	1	0	1
				TOTALS	35	3	38

=== Disciplinary record ===
Number	Nation	Position	Name	Premier League		Kazakhstan Cup		Total	
Number	Nation	Position	Name	Yellow card	Red card	Yellow card	Red card	Yellow card	Red card
2	(Kazakhstan)	MF	Adilkhan Tanzharikov	12	1	0	0	12	1
5	(Kazakhstan)	DF	Bagdat Kairov	5	1	1	0	6	1
6	(Kazakhstan)	DF	Rustam Temirkhan	1	0	0	0	1	0
11	(Kazakhstan)	MF	Saša Marjanović	2	0	0	0	2	0
12	(Kazakhstan)	MF	Alisher Azhimov	3	0	0	0	3	0
17	(Kazakhstan)	DF	Esen Zhasanov	3	0	0	0	3	0
19	(Kazakhstan)	MF	Ardak Saulet	2	0	0	0	2	0
22	(Russia)	MF	Vitali Volkov	3	1	1	0	4	1
23	(Croatia)	MF	Hrvoje Miličević	0	0	1	0	1	0
24	(Serbia)	MF	Milan Radin	2	0	1	0	3	0
25	(Kazakhstan)	DF	Sayat Zhumagali	1	0	0	0	1	0
28	(Kazakhstan)	FW	Rustam Sakhibov	2	0	0	0	2	0
42	(Kazakhstan)	GK	Igor Trofimets	2	0	0	0	2	0
47	(Kazakhstan)	MF	Aslanbek Kakimov	2	0	0	0	2	0
77	(Kazakhstan)	MF	Zhambyl Kukeyev	2	1	0	0	2	1
86	(Ukraine)	MF	Oleksandr Kitsak	3	0	0	0	3	0
88	(Kazakhstan)	MF	Anton Shurigin	5	0	0	0	5	0
95	(Kazakhstan)	FW	Abat Aimbetov	2	0	0	0	2	0
96	(Kazakhstan)	FW	Ulykbek Syrlybayev	1	0	0	0	1	0
Players who left Aktobe during the season:
			TOTALS	53	3	4	0	57	3
