= List of Kazakhstan football transfers winter 2018–19 =

This is a list of Kazakh football transfers in the winter transfer window 2019 by club. Only clubs of the 2019 Kazakhstan Premier League are included.

== Kazakhstan Premier League 2019 ==
=== Aktobe ===
In: Note: Flags indicate national team as defined under FIFA eligibility rules; some limited exceptions apply. Players may hold more than one non-FIFA nationality.

No.	Pos.	Nation	Player

Out: Note: Flags indicate national team as defined under FIFA eligibility rules; some limited exceptions apply. Players may hold more than one non-FIFA nationality.

No.	Pos.	Nation	Player
9	MF	KAZ	Ruslan Valiullin (to (Kazakhstan) Tobol)
50	FW	BRA	Reynaldo (to (Azerbaijan) Qarabağ)
87	DF	SRB	Aleksandar Simčević (loan return to (Kazakhstan) Ordabasy)

=== Astana ===
In: Note: Flags indicate national team as defined under FIFA eligibility rules; some limited exceptions apply. Players may hold more than one non-FIFA nationality.

No.	Pos.	Nation	Player
9	FW	ROU	Dorin Rotariu (from (Belgium) Club Brugge)
24	DF	CRO	Luka Šimunović (from (Belarus) Shakhtyor Soligorsk)
35	GK	KAZ	Aleksandr Mokin (to (Kazakhstan) Irtysh Pavlodar)
91	FW	KAZ	Sergei Khizhnichenko (to (Kazakhstan) Ordabasy)

Out: Note: Flags indicate national team as defined under FIFA eligibility rules; some limited exceptions apply. Players may hold more than one non-FIFA nationality.

No.	Pos.	Nation	Player
6	MF	HUN	László Kleinheisler (to (Croatia) NK Osijek)
19	MF	KAZ	Baktiyar Zaynutdinov (to (Russia) Rostov)
35	GK	KAZ	Aleksandr Mokin (to (Kazakhstan) Irtysh Pavlodar)
99	FW	KAZ	Aleksey Shchotkin (to (Kazakhstan) Ordabasy)
—	DF	RUS	Marat Bystrov (to (Kazakhstan) Ordabasy)
—	MF	BIH	Srđan Grahovac (to (Austria) Rapid Wien)

=== Atyrau ===
In: Note: Flags indicate national team as defined under FIFA eligibility rules; some limited exceptions apply. Players may hold more than one non-FIFA nationality.

No.	Pos.	Nation	Player
6	MF	SVN	Željko Filipović (from (Belarus) Dynamo Brest)
10	FW	CRO	Josip Ivančić (from (Israel) Ashdod)
11	MF	KAZ	Vladimir Vomenko (from (Kazakhstan) Irtysh Pavlodar)
16	GK	KAZ	Alexander Zarutsky (from (Russia) Kubanskaya Korona Shevchenko)
23	MF	UKR	Andriy Tkachuk (from (Kazakhstan) Akzhayik)
27	DF	KAZ	Andrey Shabaev (from (Kazakhstan) Kyzylzhar)
31	FW	SRB	Darko Bjedov (from (Serbia) Vojvodina)
33	MF	UKR	Serhiy Zahynaylov (from (Ukraine) Sumy)
—	DF	CRO	Ivica Žunić (from (Ukraine) Chornomorets Odesa)

Out: Note: Flags indicate national team as defined under FIFA eligibility rules; some limited exceptions apply. Players may hold more than one non-FIFA nationality.

No.	Pos.	Nation	Player
3	MF	CMR	Joseph Nane
4	DF	CRO	Tomislav Barbarić (to (Bosnia and Herzegovina) Zrinjski Mostar)
6	MF	KAZ	Altynbek Saparov
11	MF	KAZ	Ruslan Zhanysbaev
17	FW	NGA	Tunde Adeniji (to (Kuwait) Al-Nasr)
20	GK	KAZ	Andrey Pasechenko (to (Kazakhstan) Tobol)
22	MF	SRB	Novica Maksimović (to (Greece) Panionios)
23	MF	KAZ	Didar Zhalmukan (loan return to (Kazakhstan) Astana)
24	MF	KAZ	Yuriy Pertsukh (loan return to (Kazakhstan) Astana)
35	GK	KAZ	Azamat Zhomartov
44	DF	CRO	Jure Obšivač (to (Slovenia) Domžale)
81	FW	SRB	Predrag Sikimić (to (Serbia) Voždovac)

=== Irtysh Pavlodar ===
In: Note: Flags indicate national team as defined under FIFA eligibility rules; some limited exceptions apply. Players may hold more than one non-FIFA nationality.

No.	Pos.	Nation	Player
4	DF	LVA	Kaspars Dubra (from (Latvia) Rīgas FS)
5	DF	SRB	Uroš Vitas (from (Belgium) Mechelen)
8	MF	HUN	Patrik Hidi (from (Hungary) Budapest Honvéd)
9	FW	KAZ	Timur Muldinov (from (Kazakhstan) Kyzylzhar)
10	MF	KAZ	Aslan Darabayev (from (Kazakhstan) Tobol)
11	MF	KAZ	Madiyar Raimbek (loan from (Kazakhstan) Kairat)
14	MF	FRA	Jérémy Manzorro (from (Lithuania) Žalgiris)
20	GK	KAZ	Anton Tsirin (from (Kazakhstan) Kyzylzhar)
21	FW	GAM	Momodou Ceesay (from (Kazakhstan) Kyzylzhar)
22	DF	KAZ	Bauyrzhan Tanirbergenov (from (Kazakhstan) Altai Semey)
23	DF	KAZ	Sagadat Tursynbay (from (Kazakhstan) Ordabasy)
33	MF	KAZ	Magomed Paragulgov (from (Kazakhstan) Kairat)
47	MF	KAZ	Arman Nusip (from (Kazakhstan) Atyrau)
66	MF	KAZ	Oybek Baltabaev (from (Kazakhstan) Kairat)
77	DF	KAZ	Stanislav Lunin (from (Kazakhstan) Kairat)
88	MF	COL	Roger Cañas (from (Belarus) Shakhtyor Soligorsk)
98	GK	KAZ	Ilya Sotnik (from (Kazakhstan) Ekibastuz)
99	FW	SRB	Milan Mirosavljev (from (Serbia) Proleter Novi Sad)
—	GK	KAZ	Aleksandr Mokin (from (Kazakhstan) Astana)

Out: Note: Flags indicate national team as defined under FIFA eligibility rules; some limited exceptions apply. Players may hold more than one non-FIFA nationality.

No.	Pos.	Nation	Player
4	DF	SRB	Miloš Stamenković (to (Belgium) Union Saint-Gilloise)
5	DF	KAZ	Aleksandr Kislitsyn (to (Kazakhstan) Okzhetpes)
8	MF	KAZ	Piraliy Aliev
10	MF	BRA	Rodrigo António
11	MF	KAZ	Vladimir Vomenko (to (Kazakhstan) Atyrau)
12	GK	KAZ	Dzhurakhon Babakhanov (to (Kazakhstan) Okzhetpes)
17	DF	KAZ	Ilya Kalinin (to (Kazakhstan) Okzhetpes)
18	DF	KAZ	Valery Lenkov
22	MF	KAZ	Kirill Shestakov
30	GK	KAZ	Serikbol Kapanov
47	MF	POR	Hugo Seco (to (Hungary) Kisvárda)
59	MF	ROU	Doru Popadiuc (to (Romania) Voluntari)
60	FW	GNB	Abel Camará (to (Turkey) Elazığspor)
91	MF	KAZ	Madiyar Ramazanov
—	GK	KAZ	Aleksandr Mokin (to (Kazakhstan) Astana)

=== Kairat ===
In: Note: Flags indicate national team as defined under FIFA eligibility rules; some limited exceptions apply. Players may hold more than one non-FIFA nationality.

No.	Pos.	Nation	Player
13	MF	Korea	Han Jeong-uh (from (South Korea) Gyeongnam)
17	MF	KAZ	Yerkebulan Tungyshbayev (from (Kazakhstan) Ordabasy)
18	MF	POL	Konrad Wrzesiński (from (Poland) Zagłębie Sosnowiec)
20	DF	SRB	Rade Dugalić (from (Russia) Yenisey Krasnoyarsk)
24	DF	CRO	Dino Mikanović (from (Denmark) AGF)

Out: Note: Flags indicate national team as defined under FIFA eligibility rules; some limited exceptions apply. Players may hold more than one non-FIFA nationality.

No.	Pos.	Nation	Player
11	MF	BRA	Isael (to (Hungary) Ferencvárosi)
17	DF	KAZ	Stanislav Lunin (to (Kazakhstan) Irtysh Pavlodar)
20	MF	CRO	Ivo Iličević (to (Germany) 1. FC Nürnberg)
24	GK	KAZ	David Loria (to (Kazakhstan) Okzhetpes)
25	MF	HUN	Ákos Elek (to (Hungary) MOL Vidi)
28	MF	RUS	Andrey Arshavin (Retired)
30	MF	BRA	Juan Felipe (to (North Macedonia) Vardar)
—	MF	KAZ	Nurlan Dairov (loan to (Kazakhstan) Okzhetpes)
—	MF	KAZ	Oybek Baltabaev (from (Kazakhstan) Irtysh Pavlodar)
—	MF	KAZ	Madiyar Raimbek (loan to (Kazakhstan) Irtysh Pavlodar)

=== Kaisar ===
In: Note: Flags indicate national team as defined under FIFA eligibility rules; some limited exceptions apply. Players may hold more than one non-FIFA nationality.

No.	Pos.	Nation	Player
2	DF	KAZ	Olzhas Altayev (from (Kazakhstan) Kyzylzhar)
9	FW	KAZ	Shokan Abzalov (from (Kazakhstan) Baikonur)
11	MF	ARM	Tigran Barseghyan (from (North Macedonia) Vardar)
19	MF	KAZ	Marat Khairullin (from (Kazakhstan) Atyrau)
20	DF	BLR	Ivan Sadownichy (from (Kazakhstan) Zhetysu)
24	FW	ARU	Joshua John (from (Turkey) Bursaspor)
77	MF	POR	Carlitos (from (Poland) Wisła Płock)
—	DF	CRO	Marin Oršulić
—	FW	COD	Kule Mbombo (from (Democratic Republic of the Congo) Vita Club)

Out: Note: Flags indicate national team as defined under FIFA eligibility rules; some limited exceptions apply. Players may hold more than one non-FIFA nationality.

No.	Pos.	Nation	Player
3	DF	KAZ	Aldan Baltayev
9	MF	UKR	Volodymyr Arzhanov (to (Ukraine) Chornomorets Odesa)
17	MF	KEN	Paul Were (to (Greece) Trikala)
18	FW	KAZ	Daurenbek Tazhimbetov
19	FW	MTQ	Mathias Coureur (to (South Korea) Seongnam)
21	DF	KAZ	Aybol Zhakhayev
23	MF	KAZ	Valeri Korobkin (to (Kazakhstan) Ordabasy)
25	MF	SLE	John Kamara (to (Azerbaijan) Keşla)
27	DF	KAZ	Dmitri Yevstigneyev
77	FW	KAZ	Toktar Zhangylyshbay (loan return to (Kazakhstan) Tobol)
99	FW	CIV	Franck Dja Djédjé

=== Okzhetpes ===
In: Note: Flags indicate national team as defined under FIFA eligibility rules; some limited exceptions apply. Players may hold more than one non-FIFA nationality.

No.	Pos.	Nation	Player
1	GK	KAZ	David Loria (from (Kazakhstan) Kairat)
3	DF	KAZ	Nurlan Dairov (loan from (Kazakhstan) Kairat)
4	DF	KAZ	Timur Rudoselskiy (from (Israel) Hapoel Petah Tikva)
5	DF	KAZ	Aleksandr Kislitsyn (from (Kazakhstan) Irtysh Pavlodar)
8	MF	EST	Artjom Dmitrijev (from (Finland) Lahti)
10	MF	KAZ	Altynbek Saparov (from (Kazakhstan) Atyrau)
12	GK	KAZ	Dzhurakhon Babakhanov (from (Kazakhstan) Irtysh Pavlodar)
14	MF	KAZ	Aslan Dzhanuzakov (from (Kazakhstan) Kyzylzhar)
17	FW	KAZ	Zhasulan Moldakaraev (from (Kazakhstan) Ordabasy)
19	DF	BLR	Uladzislaw Kasmynin (from (Uzbekistan) AGMK)
24	MF	SRB	Milan Stojanović (from (Serbia) Radnik Surdulica)
25	DF	PAN	Roderick Miller (from (Portugal) Feirense)
28	MF	MNE	Darko Zorić (from (Serbia) Čukarički)
77	MF	KAZ	Ilya Kalinin (from (Kazakhstan) Irtysh Pavlodar)
88	MF	KAZ	Azat Ersalimov (from (Kazakhstan) Akzhayik)
99	FW	BRA	Danilo Almeida Alves (from (Albania) Flamurtari Vlorë)

Out: Note: Flags indicate national team as defined under FIFA eligibility rules; some limited exceptions apply. Players may hold more than one non-FIFA nationality.

No.	Pos.	Nation	Player

=== Ordabasy ===
In: Note: Flags indicate national team as defined under FIFA eligibility rules; some limited exceptions apply. Players may hold more than one non-FIFA nationality.

No.	Pos.	Nation	Player
3	MF	KAZ	Valeri Korobkin (from (Kazakhstan) Kaisar)
7	MF	RSA	May Mahlangu (loan from (Bulgaria) Ludogorets Razgrad)
12	GK	KAZ	Dmytro Nepohodov (from (Kazakhstan) Tobol)
19	DF	KAZ	Marat Bystrov (from (Kazakhstan) Astana)
20	FW	KAZ	Toktar Zhangylyshbay (from (Kazakhstan) Tobol)
25	DF	KAZ	Serhiy Malyi (from (Kazakhstan) Astana)
37	FW	BRA	João Paulo (loan from (Bulgaria) Ludogorets Razgrad)
39	FW	BEL	Ziguy Badibanga (from (Moldova) Sheriff Tiraspol)
99	FW	KAZ	Aleksey Shchotkin (from (Kazakhstan) Astana)

Out: Note: Flags indicate national team as defined under FIFA eligibility rules; some limited exceptions apply. Players may hold more than one non-FIFA nationality.

No.	Pos.	Nation	Player
7	FW	SRB	Nemanja Kojić (to (Japan) Tokyo Verdy)
21	MF	KAZ	Yerkebulan Tungyshbayev (to (Kazakhstan) Kairat)
33	MF	RUS	Nikita Bocharov (to (Kazakhstan) Tobol)
71	FW	KAZ	Zhasulan Moldakaraev (to (Kazakhstan) Okzhetpes)
91	FW	KAZ	Sergei Khizhnichenko (to (Kazakhstan) Astana)
—	DF	KAZ	Sagadat Tursynbay (to (Kazakhstan) Irtysh Pavlodar)

=== Shakhter Karagandy ===
In: Note: Flags indicate national team as defined under FIFA eligibility rules; some limited exceptions apply. Players may hold more than one non-FIFA nationality.

No.	Pos.	Nation	Player
5	DF	UKR	Artem Baranovskyi (from (Tajikistan) Istiklol)
8	MF	CRO	Ivan Pešić (loan from (Romania) Dinamo București)
10	MF	KAZ	Yerkebulan Nurgaliyev (from (Kazakhstan) Akzhayik)
11	FW	EST	Sergei Zenjov (from (Poland) KS Cracovia)
18	MF	UGA	Luwagga Kizito (loan from (Romania) Politehnica Iași)
72	MF	KAZ	Sergei Skorykh (from (Kazakhstan) Kyzylzhar)
77	DF	KAZ	Berik Shaikhov (from (Kazakhstan) Akzhayik)
88	MF	KOS	Donjet Shkodra (from (Albania) Kukësi)

Out: Note: Flags indicate national team as defined under FIFA eligibility rules; some limited exceptions apply. Players may hold more than one non-FIFA nationality.

No.	Pos.	Nation	Player
4	DF	KAZ	Mikhail Gabyshev
5	DF	KAZ	Kirill Pasichnik
6	DF	KAZ	Ilnur Mangutkin
7	FW	KAZ	Sergei Shaff
8	MF	BLR	Alyaksandr Valadzko (to (Belarus) Shakhtyor Soligorsk)
10	MF	MNE	Damir Kojašević (to (Serbia) Radnički Niš)
11	FW	ARM	Gegham Harutyunyan (loan return to (Armenia) Gandzasar Kapan)
16	MF	EST	Sergei Mošnikov (to (Lithuania) Palanga)
18	MF	KAZ	Igor Yurin
20	DF	CRO	Mateo Mužek (to (Scotland) St Mirren)
21	MF	KAZ	Madi Zhakypbayev (loan return to (Kazakhstan) Astana)
27	MF	CZE	Egon Vůch (loan return to (Kazakhstan) Tobol)
34	DF	KAZ	Igor Pikalkin
54	MF	KAZ	Maxim Galkin
71	FW	KAZ	Vyacheslav Putintsev
80	MF	KAZ	Aidos Oral

=== Taraz ===
In: Note: Flags indicate national team as defined under FIFA eligibility rules; some limited exceptions apply. Players may hold more than one non-FIFA nationality.

No.	Pos.	Nation	Player
5	DF	KAZ	Rakhymzhan Rozybakiev (from (Kazakhstan) Okzhetpes)
6	DF	GEO	Lasha Kasradze (from (Kazakhstan) Zhetysu)
13	MF	KAZ	Zhakyp Kozhamberdi (from (Kazakhstan) Zhetysu)
18	DF	KAZ	Victor Kryukov (from (Kazakhstan) Okzhetpes)
23	MF	SRB	Nemanja Subotić (from (Slovakia) iClinic Sereď)
80	FW	BRA	Elivelto (from (Latvia) RFS)
88	MF	BRA	Gian (from (Brazil) Cruzeiro)
99	FW	GEO	Elguja Lobjanidze (from (Georgia (country)) Rustavi)

Out: Note: Flags indicate national team as defined under FIFA eligibility rules; some limited exceptions apply. Players may hold more than one non-FIFA nationality.

No.	Pos.	Nation	Player

=== Tobol ===
In: Note: Flags indicate national team as defined under FIFA eligibility rules; some limited exceptions apply. Players may hold more than one non-FIFA nationality.

No.	Pos.	Nation	Player
11	DF	KAZ	Ruslan Valiullin (from (Kazakhstan) Aktobe)
12	GK	AZE	Emil Balayev (from (Azerbaijan) Sabail)
22	GK	KAZ	Andrey Pasechenko (from (Kazakhstan) Atyrau)
23	FW	CIV	Senin Sebai (from (Russia) Tambov)
24	DF	RUS	Aleksandr Kleshchenko (from (Russia) Tom Tomsk)
62	MF	BLR	Mikhail Gordeichuk (from (Belarus) BATE Borisov)
69	MF	RUS	Nikita Bocharov (from (Kazakhstan) Ordabasy)

Out: Note: Flags indicate national team as defined under FIFA eligibility rules; some limited exceptions apply. Players may hold more than one non-FIFA nationality.

No.	Pos.	Nation	Player
5	DF	ROU	Ionuț Larie (to (Romania) Gaz Metan Mediaș)
9	MF	KAZ	Nurbol Zhumaskaliyev (Retired)
11	MF	KAZ	Aslan Darabayev (to (Kazakhstan) Irtysh Pavlodar)
12	GK	KAZ	Dmytro Nepohodov (to (Kazakhstan) Ordabasy)
18	DF	KAZ	Timur Zhakupov
33	GK	KAZ	Vyacheslav Kotlyar
71	FW	KAZ	Dmitry Zagvostkin
79	FW	KAZ	Tanat Nusserbayev (loan return to (Kazakhstan) Ordabasy)
92	DF	KAZ	Marat Bystrov (loan return to (Kazakhstan) Astana)
99	FW	ARG	Juan Lescano (loan return to (Russia) Anzhi Makhachkala)

=== Zhetysu ===
In: Note: Flags indicate national team as defined under FIFA eligibility rules; some limited exceptions apply. Players may hold more than one non-FIFA nationality.

No.	Pos.	Nation	Player
8	MF	KAZ	Ablaykhan Makhambetov (from (Kazakhstan) Kyran)
13	DF	KAZ	Yermek Kuantayev (from (Kazakhstan) Kairat)
21	MF	SRB	Nenad Adamović (from (Belarus) Vitebsk)
23	DF	BLR	Nikita Naumov (from (Belarus) Vitebsk)
28	DF	KAZ	Miram Sapanov (from (Kazakhstan) Akzhayik)
96	MF	KAZ	Ivan Antipov (from (Kazakhstan) Akzhayik)
99	FW	BUL	Ivaylo Dimitrov (loan from Ararat-Armenia)

Out: Note: Flags indicate national team as defined under FIFA eligibility rules; some limited exceptions apply. Players may hold more than one non-FIFA nationality.

No.	Pos.	Nation	Player
2	DF	KAZ	Temirlan Adilkhanov
6	DF	GEO	Lasha Kasradze (to (Kazakhstan) Taraz)
8	DF	KAZ	Serik Sagyndykov
9	FW	SRB	Milan Bojović (to (Serbia) Mladost Lučani)
17	MF	KAZ	Zhakyp Kozhamberdi (to (Kazakhstan) Taraz)
18	MF	ARM	Edgar Malakyan (to (Romania) Petrolul Ploiești)
20	DF	BLR	Ivan Sadownichy (loan return to (Kazakhstan) Kaisar)
22	FW	KAZ	Rifat Nurmugamet (loan return to (Kazakhstan) Kairat)
80	MF	UZB	Server Djeparov (to (Uzbekistan) Metallurg Bekabad)
89	GK	KAZ	Nurlybek Ayazbaev
