= Yevheniy Tkachuk =

Ukrainian footballer

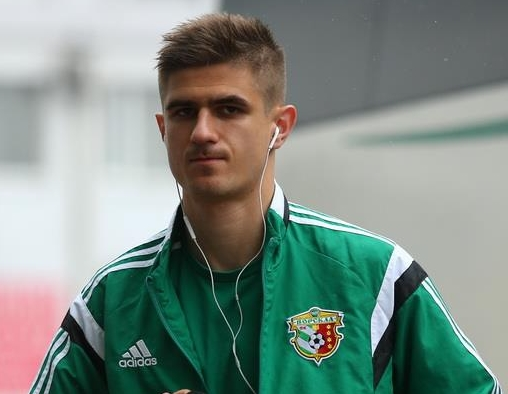

Personal information
- Full name: Yevheniy Olehovych Tkachuk
- Date of birth: 27 June 1991 (age 35)
- Place of birth: Zaporizhzhia, Ukrainian SSR
- Height: 1.92 m (6 ft 3 1/2 in)
- Position: Defender

Youth career
- 2004–2008: Metalurh Zaporizhzhia

Senior career*
Years	Team	Apps	(Gls)
2009	Shakhtar-3 Donetsk	1	(0)
2010–2015	Vorskla Poltava	71	(0)
2016	Zorya Luhansk	2	(1)
2017	Irtysh Pavlodar	12	(2)
2017	Stal Kamianske	10	(0)
2018–2020	Shakhter Karagandy	61	(4)
2021–2024	Metalist 1925 Kharkiv	45	(2)

International career
2011	Ukraine U21	3	(0)
- * Club domestic league appearances and goals as of 3 July 2024

Yevheniy Olehovych Tkachuk (Ukrainian: Євгеній Олегович Ткачук; born 27 June 1991) is a Ukrainian professional footballer who plays as a defender.

== Career ==
=== Club ===
Tkachuk is the product of Metalurh Zaporizhzhia academy.

On 24 February 2017, Tkachuk signed for FC Irtysh Pavlodar, leaving the club on 5 June 2017 by mutual consent.

On 26 January 2018, Tkachuk returned to Kazakhstan, signing for FC Shakhter Karagandy.

=== International ===
Tkachuk was called up to the Ukraine national under-21 football team for matches in the Valeri Lobanovsky Memorial Tournament in 9–10 August 2011.
