= Samat Sarsenov =

Kazakh football midfielder (born 1996)

Personal information
- Full name: Samat Amangeldyevich Sarsenov
- Date of birth: 19 August 1996 (age 30)
- Place of birth: Novotroitsk, Russia
- Height: 1.84 m (6 ft 1/2 in)
- Position: Forward

Youth career
- 2003–2013: Nosta Novotroitsk

Senior career*
Years	Team	Apps	(Gls)
2013–2014	Nosta Novotroitsk	7	(0)
2014–2016	Orenburg	0	(0)
2017–2019	Kairat	10	(0)
2017–2019	→ Kairat-Zhastar	48	(14)
2019	→ Taraz (loan)	11	(0)
2020	Valmiera	9	(2)
2020	Spartaks Jūrmala	6	(1)
2021–2023	Okzhetpes	48	(11)
2024	Caspiy	8	(3)
2024–2025	Dynamo Vologda	35	(9)

International career
2017–2018	Kazakhstan U-21	2	(0)
- * Club domestic league appearances and goals as of 2 November 2025

Samat Amangeldyevich Sarsenov (Kazakh: Самат Амангелдіұлы Сәрсенов; Russian: Самат Амангелдыевич Сарсенов; born 19 August 1996) is a Kazakh football forward.

== Career ==
Sarsenov made his debut in the Russian Second Division for FC Nosta Novotroitsk on 26 July 2013 in a game against FC Oktan Perm.

On 27 March 2017, Sarsenov joined Kazakhstan Premier League side FC Kairat on a three-year contract.

On 24 July 2019, Sarsenov joined FC Taraz on loan for the remainder of the 2019 Kazakhstan Premier League season.

On 6 February 2020, Kairat confirmed that Sarsenov had left the club to join Valmiera FC in the Latvian Higher League. He joined fellow league club FK Spartaks Jūrmala on 1 September 2020.

== Career statistics ==
=== Club ===
As of match played 15 November 2019.

Appearances and goals by club, season and competition
Club	Season	League			National Cup		Continental		Other		Total	
Club	Season	Division	Apps	Goals	Apps	Goals	Apps	Goals	Apps	Goals	Apps	Goals
Orenburg	2015-16	Russian Football National League	0	0	0	0	-		-		0	0
Orenburg	2016-17	Russian Premier League	0	0	0	0	-		-		0	0
Orenburg	Total		0	0	0	0	0	0	0	0	0	0
Kairat	2017	Kazakhstan Premier League	0	0	0	0	0	0	0	0	0	0
Kairat	2018	Kazakhstan Premier League	1	0	2	0	0	0	0	0	3	0
Kairat	2019	Kazakhstan Premier League	5	0	2	1	0	0	0	0	7	1
Kairat	Total		6	0	4	1	0	0	0	0	10	1
Taraz (loan)	2019	Kazakhstan Premier League	11	0	0	0	-		1	0	12	0
Career total			17	0	4	1	0	0	1	0	22	1
