= Mihailo Jovanović (footballer) =

Serbian footballer

Personal information
- Full name: Mihailo Jovanović
- Date of birth: 15 February 1989 (age 37)
- Place of birth: Titovo Užice, SFR Yugoslavia
- Height: 1.90 m (6 ft 3 in)
- Position: Centre-back

Team information
- Current team: Sloboda Užice
- Number: 28

Youth career
- Jedinstvo Putevi

Senior career*
Years	Team	Apps	(Gls)
2007–2008	Sloboda Užice	9	(1)
2008–2011	Mladost Lučani	19	(0)
2008–2011	→ Sloga Požega (loan)	33	(5)
2011	Sloga Požega	13	(0)
2012	Jedinstvo Putevi	28	(0)
2013	Olomouc	11	(0)
2013–2015	Karviná	46	(5)
2015	→ Slavia Orlová (loan)	1	(1)
2016–2017	Zbrojovka Brno	15	(0)
2017	→ Karviná (loan)	11	(2)
2018	Voždovac	1	(0)
2018	Neman Grodno	10	(0)
2019	Taraz	14	(0)
2020	Inđija	9	(1)
2020–2021	Valletta	7	(0)
2021	Alashkert	10	(1)
2022	Dinamo Samarqand	18	(1)
2023	Kuching City	15	(0)
2024–	Sloboda Užice	48	(2)
- * Club domestic league appearances and goals as of 25 June 2025

Mihailo Jovanović (Serbian Cyrillic: Михаило Јовановић; born 15 February 1989) is a Serbian professional footballer who plays as a centre-back for Sloboda Užice.
