= Serge Nyuiadzi =

Togolese footballer

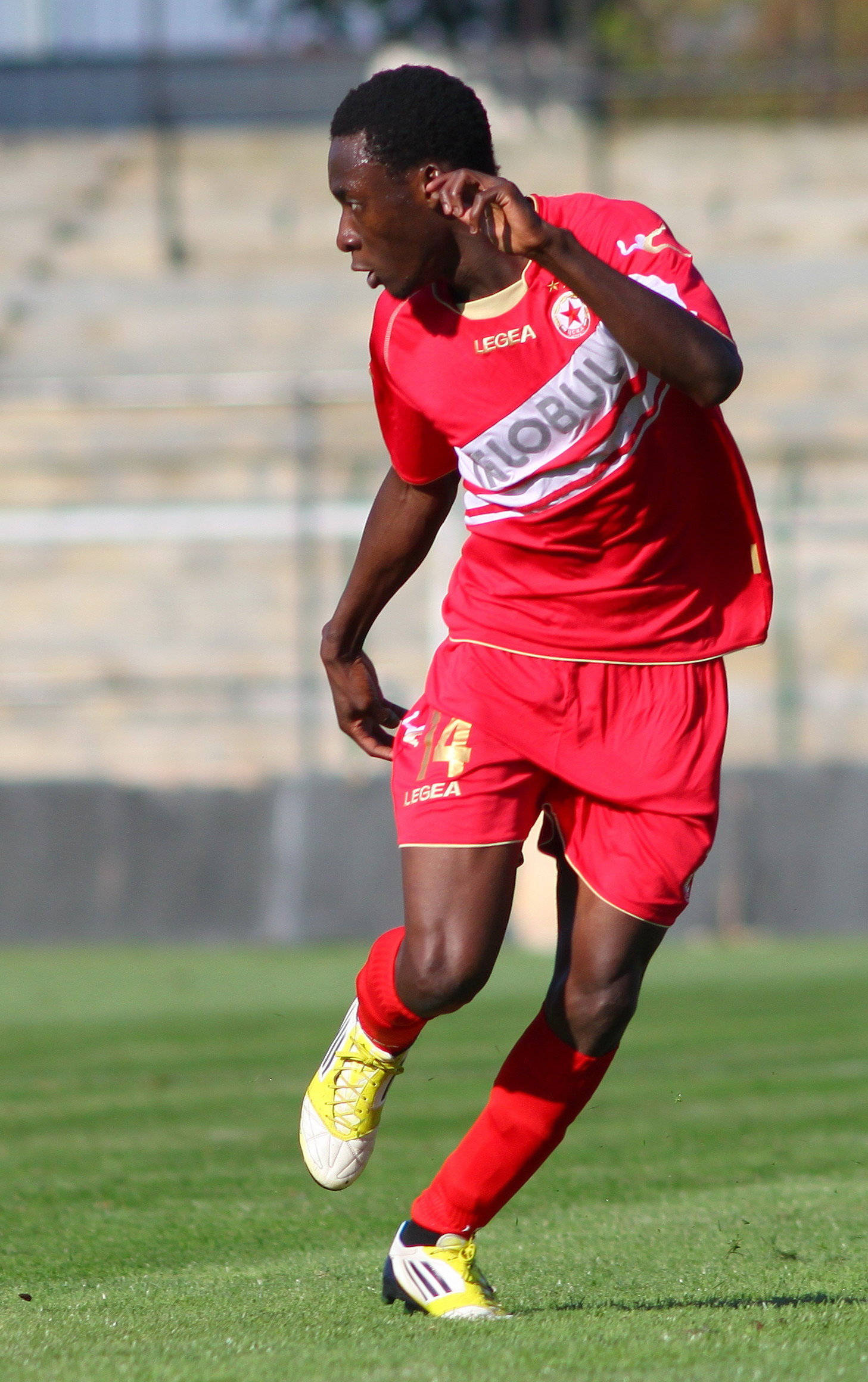

Personal information
- Full name: Komla Serge Sitsofe Nyuiadzi
- Date of birth: 17 September 1991 (age 35)
- Place of birth: Agou, Togo
- Height: 1.78 m (5 ft 10 in)
- Positions: Winger; forward

Youth career
- Nice

Senior career*
Years	Team	Apps	(Gls)
2011–2012	Nice	0	(0)
2012–2013	CSKA Sofia	8	(1)
2013–2016	Žalgiris Vilnius	66	(19)
2016	1461 Trabzon	5	(0)
2017–2019	Žalgiris Vilnius	40	(4)
2017	→ Astra Giurgiu (loan)	7	(1)
2019	Taraz	26	(8)
2020	Caspiy	2	(0)
2020	Taraz	13	(2)
2021	Sūduva	29	(8)
2022	Ordabasy	21	(7)
2023	Ratchaburi	4	(0)
2023	Maktaaral	8	(1)

International career
2021–2022	Togo	6	(0)
- * Club domestic league appearances and goals as of 23 November 2023

Komla Serge Sitsofe Nyuiadzi (born 17 September 1991) is a Togolese professional footballer who plays as a winger or forward for the Togo national team.

== Career ==
=== Nice ===
Nyuiadzi started to play football at the academy of OGC Nice. During his stay at the club he was part of the France U-17 and U-19 teams. He mainly played for the reserve team of OGC Nice, and was released by the team during the spring of 2012.

=== CSKA Sofia ===
CSKA Sofia signed Nyuiadzi as a free agent in September 2012. He competed for the team in several friendly matches and scored a goal against Slivnishki geroi. On 30 September, Nyuiadzi made his debut in the A Group for CSKA in a 3–1 win against Etar 1924. On 20 October he netted his first goal in the professional football for his team in a 1–0 win in the Eternal derby against Levski Sofia. However he did not manage to impress and find his place in the first team and on 12 June 2013 the Bulgarian Football Union announced, that Nyuiadzi's contract with the club had been terminated and he was free to go.

=== Žalgiris Vilnius and 1461 Trabzon ===
He eventually continued his career with Lithuanian side Žalgiris Vilnius, having two spells with the club, as well as a short stint with Turkish team 1461 Trabzon sandwiched between them.

=== FC Taraz ===
In March 2019, he moved to FC Taraz and scored his first goal.

=== FC Caspiy ===
On 11 February 2020, Nyuiadzi signed for FC Caspiy.

== International career ==
Nyuiadzi debuted for the Togo national team in a friendly 2–0 win over Guinea on 5 June 2021.

== Honours ==
Žalgiris Vilnius

- Lithuanian Championship: 2013, 2014, 2015
- Lithuanian Cup: 2013–14, 2014–15, 2015–16, 2018
