= Nemanja Subotić =

Serbian footballer

Personal information
- Date of birth: 23 January 1992 (age 34)
- Place of birth: Belgrade, SFR Yugoslavia
- Height: 1.82 m (6 ft 0 in)
- Position: Winger

Team information
- Current team: Budućnost Dobanovci

Youth career
- Radnički Beograd
- Zemun
- Teleoptik
- Rad

Senior career*
Years	Team	Apps	(Gls)
2011–2014	Budućnost Dobanovci	50	(7)
2014–2015	Bežanija	11	(0)
2015–2017	Budućnost Dobanovci	55	(27)
2017–2018	Vojvodina	31	(5)
2018	Sereď	6	(0)
2019	Taraz	32	(0)
2020	Radnički Niš	19	(0)
2020–2023	Radnik Surdulica	93	(9)
2023–2024	Inđija	29	(1)
2024-	Budućnost Dobanovci		
- * Club domestic league appearances and goals as of 26 December 2023

Nemanja Subotić (Serbian Cyrillic: Немања Суботић; born 23 January 1992) is a Serbian footballer who plays for Budućnost Dobanovci.

== Club career ==
=== Budućnost Dobanovci ===
Born in Belgrade, Subotić played with several local clubs in his early years, including youth teams of Radnički Beograd, Zemun, Teleoptik and Rad. Subotić started his senior career with Budućnost Dobanovci, winning the Belgrade Zone League for the 2011–12 season. He made a total of 50 appearances and scored 7 goals in the Serbian League Belgrade between 2012 and 2014. He spent the 2014–15 season playing with Serbian First League side Bežanija. In the first season of his second spell with Budućnost Dobanovci, Subotić scored 14 goals in 26 matches, helping the team to make a historical success winning the Serbian League Belgrade. He was also the best team scorer for the 2016–17 season with 13 goals in 29 matches in the Serbian First League, including a hat-trick against Dinamo Vranje. Subotić signed his first professional contract with the club in February 2017.

=== Vojvodina ===
On 30 May 2017, Subotić moved to Serbian SuperLiga side Vojvodina on a two-year deal. He made his debut for the club in a 2–1 victory over MFK Ružomberok in the first leg of the 2017–18 UEFA Europa League first qualifying round. Subotić made his Serbian SuperLiga debut on 21 July 2017, in a 1–0 home win versus Čukarički. He scored his first goal for Vojvodina in an away match against Radnik Surdulica the next week. Subotić collected 36 appearances and scored 6 goals in all competitions during the 2017–18 season. At the beginning of new season in the Serbian SuperLiga, Subotić converted his squad number to 23, which had previously worn by Marko Vukasović. Following two opening matches he missed under coach Aleksandar Veselinović, Subotić mutually terminated his contract with Vojvodina and left the club on a free transfer.

== Style of play ==
Subotić mainly plays as a left-wing with the possibility to play on inverted side, as also the central winger position. Having creative abilities and good starting acceleration, Subotić affirmed himself as the most productive player in his first Serbian First League season with Budućnost Dobanovci being involved in actions for 20 scored goals.

== Career statistics ==
As of 22 April 2018

Appearances and goals by club, season and competition
Club	Season	League			Cup		Continental		Other		Total	
Club	Season	Division	Apps	Goals	Apps	Goals	Apps	Goals	Apps	Goals	Apps	Goals
Budućnost Dobanovci	2012–13	Serbian League Belgrade	23	1	—		—		—		23	1
Budućnost Dobanovci	2013–14	Serbian League Belgrade	27	6	—		—		—		27	6
Bežanija	2014–15	Serbian First League	11	0	1	0	—		—		12	0
Budućnost Dobanovci	2015–16	Serbian League Belgrade	26	14	—		—		—		26	14
Budućnost Dobanovci	2016–17	Serbian First League	29	13	—		—		—		29	13
Budućnost Dobanovci	Total		105	34	—		—		—		105	34
Vojvodina	2017–18	Serbian SuperLiga	31	5	3	1	2	0	—		36	6
Vojvodina	2018–19	Serbian SuperLiga	0	0	—		—		—		0	0
Vojvodina	Total		31	5	3	1	2	0	—		36	6
Career total			147	39	4	1	2	0	—		153	40

== Honours ==
Budućnost Dobanovci

- Belgrade Zone League: 2011–12
- Serbian League Belgrade: 2015–16
