= Elguja Lobjanidze =

Georgian football player (born 1992)

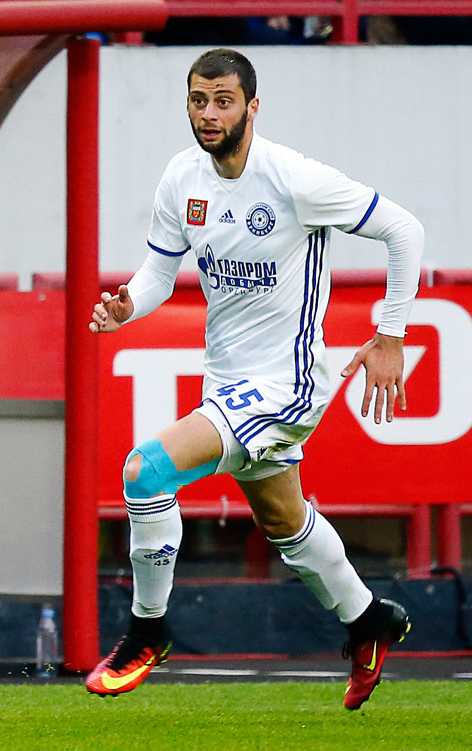
- Lobjanidze with Orenburg in 2017

Personal information
- Date of birth: 17 September 1992 (age 34)
- Place of birth: Tbilisi, Georgia
- Height: 1.93 m (6 ft 4 in)
- Position: Forward

Team information
- Current team: Altai
- Number: 29

Senior career*
Years	Team	Apps	(Gls)
2012–2015	WIT Georgia	78	(15)
2015–2016	Shukura Kobuleti	28	(7)
2016–2017	Dinamo Batumi	15	(5)
2017	Orenburg	13	(2)
2018	Shukura Kobuleti	13	(2)
2018	Rustavi	15	(2)
2019	Taraz	24	(8)
2020	Kaisar	13	(8)
2021	Tobol	22	(4)
2022	Dinamo Batumi	11	(3)
2022	Kyzylzhar	10	(7)
2023	Meizhou Hakka	12	(0)
2023	Heilongjiang Ice City	17	(6)
2024–2025	Qizilqum	25	(11)
2025–2026	Jenis	21	(4)
2026–	Altai	0	(0)

International career^{‡}
2017–	Georgia	11	(0)
- * Club domestic league appearances and goals as of 1 November 2026 ‡ National team caps and goals as of 10:55, 27 November 2020 (UTC)

Elguja Lobjanidze (Georgian: ელგუჯა ლობჯანიძე; born 17 September 1992) is a Georgian football player who is playing for Kazakhstan Premier League club Altai.

== Club career ==
Lobjanidze made his debut in the Russian Premier League for FC Orenburg on 4 March 2017 in a game against FC Arsenal Tula.

On 13 January 2020, Lobjanidze was announced as a new signing for Kazakhstan Premier League club FC Kaisar.

On 18 February 2021, Lobjanidze was announced as a new signing for Kazakhstan Premier League club FC Tobol.

In February 2023, Lobjanidze joined Chinese Super League club Meizhou Hakka.

On 3 July 2023, Lobjanidze joined China League One club Heilongjiang Ice City.

In February 2024, Lobjanidze joined Uzbekistan Super League club Qizilqum.

== Career statistics ==
=== Club ===
As of match played 6 November 2011

Appearances and goals by club, season and competition
Club	Season	League			National Cup		League Cup		Continental		Other		Total	
Club	Season	Division	Apps	Goals	Apps	Goals	Apps	Goals	Apps	Goals	Apps	Goals	Apps	Goals
WIT Georgia	2011–12	Umaglesi Liga	0	0	0	0	—		—		12 (Note: Appearances and goals in the Umaglesi Liga Promotion/relegation round)	1	12	1
WIT Georgia	2012–13	Umaglesi Liga	22	4	2	0	—		—		—		24	4
WIT Georgia	2013–14	Umaglesi Liga	29	7	1	1	—		—		—		30	8
WIT Georgia	2014–15	Umaglesi Liga	27	4	4	0	—		—		—		31	4
WIT Georgia	Total		78	15	7	1	0	0	0	0	12	1	97	17
Shukura Kobuleti	2015–16	Umaglesi Liga	28	7	4	4	—		—		—		32	11
Dinamo Batumi	2016	Umaglesi Liga	15	5	1	0	—		—		—		16	5
Orenburg	2016–17	Russian Premier League	11	1	0	0	—		—		2 (Note: Appearances in the Russian Premier League Relegation play-offs)	0	13	1
Shukura Kobuleti	2018	Erovnuli Liga 2	13	2	1	1	—		—		—		14	3
Rustavi	2018	Erovnuli Liga	15	2	1	0	—		—		—		16	2
Taraz	2019	Kazakhstan Premier League	24	8	1	0	—		—		0 (Note: Appearances in the Kazakhstan Premier League Relegation play-offs)	0	25	8
Kaisar	2020	Kazakhstan Premier League	13	8	0	0	—		1 (Note: Appearance and goal in the UEFA Europa League)	1	1 (Note: Appearances in the Kazakhstan Super Cup)	0	15	9
Tobol	2021	Kazakhstan Premier League	22	4	4	0	—		1 (Note: Appearance in the UEFA Europa Conference League)	0	2	0	29	4
Dinamo Batumi	2022	Umaglesi Liga	11	3	0	0	—		—		—		11	3
Kyzylzhar	2022	Kazakhstan Premier League	10	7	3	1	—		—		—		13	8
Meizhou Hakka	2023	Chinese Super League	12	0	0	0	—		—		—		0	0
Career total			246	61	22	7	0	0	2	1	17	1	287	70

=== International ===
Georgia
Year	Apps	Goals
2017	1	0
2018	0	0
2019	5	0
2020	5	0
Total	11	0

Statistics accurate as of match played 18 November 2020
