= Zhakyp Kozhamberdy =

Kazakhstani footballer

Personal information
- Full name: Zhakyp Yesimuly Kozhamberdy
- Date of birth: 26 February 1992 (age 34)
- Place of birth: Taraz, Kazakhstan
- Height: 1.74 m (5 ft 9 in)
- Position: Winger

Team information
- Current team: Taraz
- Number: 11

Senior career*
Years	Team	Apps	(Gls)
2013–2015	Taraz	44	(5)
2015	Astana	0	(0)
2016	Okzhetpes	21	(0)
2017	Taraz	26	(2)
2018	Zhetysu	21	(1)
2019	Taraz	20	(0)
2020	Kyran	12	(6)
2021–2022	Taraz B	10	(2)
2021–2022	Taraz	31	(5)
2023	Taraz	13	(3)
2024	Khan Tengri	16	(1)
2025	Caspiy	24	(11)
2026–	Taraz	21	(1)

International career
2015–	Kazakhstan	2	(0)
- * Club domestic league appearances and goals as of 2 November 2026

Zhakyp Yesimuly Kozhamberdy (Kazakh: Жақып Есімұлы Қожамберді, Jaqyp Esımūly Qojamberdı; born 26 February 1992) is a Kazakhstani footballer who plays as a midfielder for Taraz.

== Club career ==
He made his debut for Taraz on 14 June 2013, starting in a 0–1 home defeat against Ordabasy and being substituted after 79 minutes for Adilet Kudaybergen. Fifteen days later, he came on as a 75th-minute substitute for Sherkhan Bauyrzhan and scored both of the team's goals in a 2–1 home win over Shakhter Karagandy. These were his only league goals in 8 appearances that season. On 10 November, he started in the Kazakhstan Cup final against Shakhter at the Astana Arena, a 0–1 defeat in which he was replaced by Emanuel Odita with three minutes remaining.

On 8 July 2015, Kozhamberdy moved to FC Astana on a six-month contract, with the option of an extension at the end of it.

== International career ==
He made his debut for the Kazakhstan national football team on 18 February 2015, replacing Azat Nurgaliev for the last 16 minutes of a 1–0 friendly win over Moldova in Aksu.
