= Lasha Kasradze =

Georgian footballer

Personal information
- Date of birth: 28 July 1989 (age 37)
- Place of birth: Tbilisi, Georgia
- Height: 1.86 m (6 ft 1 in)
- Position: Defender

Team information
- Current team: Rustavi
- Number: 3

Youth career
- WIT Georgia

Senior career*
Years	Team	Apps	(Gls)
2010–2014	WIT Georgia	96	(4)
2014–2015	AZAL	46	(1)
2015–2016	Inter Baku	20	(0)
2016	Sioni Bolnisi	12	(0)
2017	Samtredia	33	(1)
2018	Zhetysu	21	(0)
2019	Taraz	17	(0)
2020	Torpedo Kutaisi	9	(0)
2020	Torpedo Kutaisi	2	(1)
2022	Samtredia	11	(0)
2022–2023	Shukura Kobuleti	17	(0)
2023–2024	Zhenis	14	(0)
2024–	Rustavi	3	(0)
- * Club domestic league appearances and goals as of 6 April 2024

Lasha Kasradze (Georgian: ლაშა კასრაძე; born 28 July 1989) is a Georgian professional footballer who plays as a defender for Rustavi.

== Career ==
Kasradze's career got underway in 2010 with WIT Georgia, making his debut in the club's penultimate fixture of the 2009–10 Umaglesi Liga season against Baia. He netted his first goal in December 2010 during a Georgian Cup victory over Tskhinvali. In total, Kasradze remained for five campaigns and made one hundred and twenty-four appearances in all competitions; scoring seven times. AZAL of the Azerbaijan Premier League completed the signing of Kasradze in 2014. He would score twice, versus Sumgayit and Neftchala, in forty-nine appearances over two seasons. 2015 saw Kasradze join fellow Azerbaijan club Inter Baku.

Twenty appearances followed in 2015–16 as Inter Baku finished fourth. Kasradze made a return to Georgian football in June 2016 by agreeing to join Sioni Bolnisi. A year later, Samtredia became Kasradze's fifth club. He featured thirty-six times and netted once in his sole season with them. In 2018, Kasradze joined Kazakhstan Premier League side Zhetysu. He made his professional debut on 11 March during a loss to Tobol. Kasradze left Zhetysu at the end of 2018, subsequently moving across the country to newly-promoted top-flight team Taraz. He returned to Georgia after eighteen matches, signing with Torpedo Kutaisi in early 2020.

Kasradze's first and last match for Torpedo Kutaisi came against Dila Gori, with the latter winning both matches. He terminated his contract in September 2020. However, in October, the defender rejoined Torpedo Kutaisi on a contract until the succeeding December. Kasradze scored on his first appearance back with the club, netting a stoppage time winner versus Merani Tbilisi on 17 October.

== Career statistics ==
As of match played 17 October 2020.

Club statistics
Club	Season	League			Cup		Continental		Other		Total	
Club	Season	Division	Apps	Goals	Apps	Goals	Apps	Goals	Apps	Goals	Apps	Goals
WIT Georgia	2009–10	Umaglesi Liga	1	0	0	0	—		0	0	1	0
WIT Georgia	2010–11	Umaglesi Liga	32	0	4	1	1 (Note: Appearance(s) in the UEFA Europa League)	0	1 (Note: Appearance(s) in the Georgian Super Cup)	0	38	1
WIT Georgia	2011–12	Umaglesi Liga	18	2	4	0	—		13 (Note: Appearance(s) in the Umaglesi Liga play-offs)	2	35	4
WIT Georgia	2012–13	Umaglesi Liga	27	0	4	0	—		0	0	31	0
WIT Georgia	2013–14	Umaglesi Liga	18	2	1	0	—		0	0	19	2
WIT Georgia	Total		96	4	13	1	1	0	14	2	124	7
AZAL	2013–14	Azerbaijan Premier League	13	1	0	0	—		0	0	13	1
AZAL	2014–15	Azerbaijan Premier League	33	0	3	1	—		0	0	36	1
AZAL	Total		46	1	3	1	—		0	0	49	2
Inter Baku	2015–16	Azerbaijan Premier League	20	0	3	1	6	0	0	0	29	1
Sioni Bolnisi	2016	Erovnuli Liga	12	0	2	0	0	0	2	0	16	0
Samtredia	2017	Erovnuli Liga	33	1	2	0	2 (Note: Appearance(s) in the UEFA Champions League)	0	1	0	38	1
Zhetysu	2018	Kazakhstan Premier League	21	0	0	0	—		0	0	21	0
Taraz	2019	Kazakhstan Premier League	17	0	1	0	—		—		18	0
Torpedo Kutaisi	2020	Erovnuli Liga	10	1	1	0	—		0	0	11	1
Career total			255	7	25	1	9	0	17	2	306	10

== Honours ==
Samtredia

- Georgian Super Cup: 2017
