= Gian (footballer, born 1993) =

Brazilian footballer

Personal information
- Full name: Gian dos Santos Martins
- Date of birth: 2 April 1993 (age 33)
- Place of birth: Porto Alegre, Brazil
- Height: 1.84 m (6 ft 0 in)
- Position: Midfielder

Team information
- Current team: Zhenis
- Number: 87

Youth career
- 2012–2013: Brasil de Pelotas

Senior career*
Years	Team	Apps	(Gls)
2013–2015	Sanjoanense	24	(1)
2015–2017	União da Madeira	55	(1)
2017–2019	Paços de Ferreira	18	(1)
2019	Taraz	31	(0)
2020	Okzhetpes	19	(1)
2021	Atyrau	24	(2)
2022	Kyzylzhar	23	(3)
2023	Ironi Kiryat Shmona	21	(1)
2025–	Zhenis	43	(3)
- * Club domestic league appearances and goals as of 1 November 2026

Gian dos Santos Martins (born 2 April 1993), or simply Gian, is a Brazilian professional footballer who plays as a central midfielder for Zhenis in the Kazakhstan Premier League.

== Career ==
=== Club ===
On 27 January 2020, FC Okzhetpes announced the signing of Gian on a contract until the end of the 2020 season.

On 21 January 2022, FC Kyzylzhar announced the signing of Gian.
