= Uroš Vitas =

Serbian footballer (born 1992)

Personal information
- Full name: Урош Витас
- Date of birth: 6 July 1992 (age 34)
- Place of birth: Niš, FR Yugoslavia
- Height: 1.90 m (6 ft 3 in)
- Position: Centre-back

Team information
- Current team: Radnički Niš
- Number: 4

Youth career
- 2000–2005: Radnički Niš
- 2006–2007: Partizan
- 2007–2010: Rad

Senior career*
Years	Team	Apps	(Gls)
2010–2013	Rad	48	(1)
2014–2015	AA Gent	5	(0)
2016–2018	Mechelen	44	(6)
2019–2020	Irtysh	20	(2)
2020	Partizan	16	(1)
2020–2022	Al-Qadsiah	25	(1)
2022–2023	Vojvodina	18	(0)
2023–2024	Emirates	14	(0)
2025–	Radnički Niš	33	(0)

International career
2010–2011	Serbia U19 (Note: Only official UEFA matches included)	6	(0)
2013–2014	Serbia U21	9	(1)
- * Club domestic league appearances and goals as of 13 June 2026

Uroš Vitas (Serbian Cyrillic: Урош Витас; born 6 July 1992) is a Serbian professional footballer who plays as a centre-back for Radnički Niš in the Serbian SuperLiga.

== Club career ==
=== Early career ===
Vitas made his senior debut with Rad in the 2010–11 season. He was named as the team's captain in early 2013, aged 20.

=== Belgium ===
In January 2014, Vitas was transferred to Belgian club Gent. He made two appearances in the title-winning 2014–15 season. In February 2016, Vitas switched to fellow Belgian First Division A club Mechelen.

=== Kazakhstan ===
On 7 February 2019, Vitas signed with Kazakh team Irtysh.

=== Between Serbia and the Middle East ===
On 11 February 2020, Vitas joined Serbian club Partizan. On 23 October 2020, Vitas joined Saudi club Al-Qadsiah. In September 2022, he signed for Vojvodina. On 30 July 2023, he joined UAE Pro League club Emirates.

== International career ==
Vitas represented Serbia at the 2011 UEFA European Under-19 Championship. He was also capped for Serbia at under-21 level.

== Honours ==
Gent

- Belgian Pro League: 2014–15
- Belgian Super Cup: 2015
