= Elivelto =

Brazilian footballer (born 1992)

Personal information
- Full name: Elivelton Ribeiro Dantas
- Date of birth: 2 January 1992 (age 34)
- Place of birth: Cruzeiro do Oeste, Brazil
- Height: 1.70 m (5 ft 7 in)
- Position: Striker

Team information
- Current team: FK Panevėžys
- Number: 80

Youth career
- 2011–2012: C.R. Flamengo

Senior career*
Years	Team	Apps	(Gls)
2012–2014	Imperial	11	(0)
2013	→ Cabofriense (loan)	9	(1)
2014–2015	Ekranas	34	(13)
2015–2017	Žalgiris Vilnius	79	(26)
2018	Maccabi Petah Tikva	13	(0)
2018	RFS	13	(4)
2019	Taraz	27	(4)
2020	Sogdiana Jizzakh	7	(0)
2020–2023	Panevėžys	69	(13)
2023–2024	Anagennisi Karditsa	15	(2)
2024	Kalamata	9	(0)
2025–	Panevėžys	30	(4)
- * Club domestic league appearances and goals as of 16 March 2026

Elivelton Ribeiro Dantas (born 2 January 1992), known as Elivelto, is a Brazilian professional footballer who plays as a striker.

== Career ==
On 28 January 2019, FC Taraz announced the signing of Elivelto.

== Honours ==
Žalgiris Vilnius

- A Lyga (2): 2015, 2016
- Lithuanian Cup (2): 2015–16, 2016
- Lithuanian Super Cup (2): 2016, 2017

Panevėžys

- Lithuanian Cup: 2020
- Lithuanian Super Cup: 2021
