= Aleksandar Simčević =

Serbian footballer

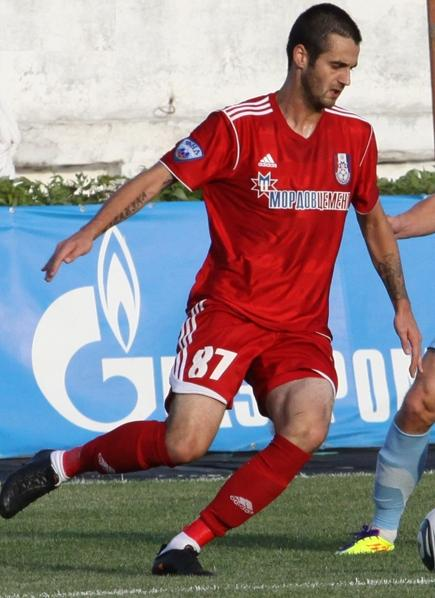
- Simčević with Mordovia Saransk in 2011

Personal information
- Date of birth: 15 February 1987 (age 39)
- Place of birth: Kruševac, SR Serbia, SFR Yugoslavia
- Height: 1.88 m (6 ft 2 in)
- Position: Defender

Youth career
- OFK Beograd

Senior career*
Years	Team	Apps	(Gls)
2004–2007	OFK Beograd	9	(0)
2006	→ Mačva Šabac (loan)	1	(0)
2006–2007	→ Dinamo Vranje (loan)	22	(2)
2008	Hajduk Kula	2	(0)
2008–2009	Dinamo Vranje	29	(2)
2009	Olimpik Sarajevo	7	(0)
2010	Jagodina	14	(0)
2010–2012	Mordovia Saransk	74	(4)
2013–2014	Shakhter Karagandy	47	(0)
2015–2017	Ordabasy	76	(6)
2018	Aktobe	28	(2)
2019	Taraz	14	(0)
2020–2021	Ordabasy	35	(4)
2022–2023	Železničar Pančevo	34	(4)
2023–2024	Radnički Beograd	16	(1)
2024–2025	Prva iskra Barič		

International career
2005	Serbia and Montenegro U19	3	(0)
- * Club domestic league appearances and goals

Aleksandar Simčević (Serbian Cyrillic: Александар Симчевић; born 15 February 1987) is a Serbian former professional footballer who played as a defender.

== Club career ==
After coming through the youth system of OFK Beograd, Simčević made his senior debut in the 2004–05 season. He later spent some time on loan to Mačva Šabac and Dinamo Vranje, scoring his first ever professional goal for the latter club. In June 2009, Simčević signed to play for Olimpik Sarajevo in the Premier League of Bosnia and Herzegovina, but quickly returned to Serbia to join Jagodina.

In the summer of 2010, Simčević moved abroad for the second time and signed with Russian club Mordovia Saransk. He helped them win promotion to the Premier League in 2012. In early 2013, Simčević moved to Kazakhstan and joined Shakhter Karagandy. He later played for Ordabasy, Aktobe, and Taraz.

== International career ==
Simčević was capped for the Serbia and Montenegro national under-19 team.
