= List of Kazakhstan football transfers winter 2017–18 =

This is a list of Kazakh football transfers in the winter transfer window 2018 by club. Only clubs of the 2018 Kazakhstan Premier League are included, with the transfer window running from 11 January until 3 April 2018.

== Kazakhstan Premier League 2018 ==
=== Aktobe ===
In: Note: Flags indicate national team as defined under FIFA eligibility rules; some limited exceptions apply. Players may hold more than one non-FIFA nationality.

No.	Pos.	Nation	Player
—	GK	KAZ	David Loria (from (Kazakhstan) Irtysh Pavlodar)
—	GK	KAZ	Ramil Nurmukhametov (from (Kazakhstan) Ordabasy)
—	DF	BRA	Fabrício (from (Cyprus) Omonia)
—	DF	SRB	Aleksandar Simčević (loan from (Kazakhstan) Ordabasy)
—	MF	CRO	Hrvoje Miličević (from (Italy) Pescara)
—	MF	GEO	Jaba Jighauri (from (North Macedonia) Vardar)
—	MF	KAZ	Ulan Konysbayev
—	MF	KAZ	Adilkhan Tanzharikov (from (Kazakhstan) Zhetysu)
—	MF	KAZ	Igor Yurin (from (Kazakhstan) Okzhetpes)
—	MF	SRB	Saša Marjanović (from (Serbia) Partizan)
—	MF	SRB	Milan Radin (from (Serbia) Partizan)
—	MF	ARM	Marcos Pizzelli (from (Saudi Arabia) Al-Shabab)
—	FW	BRA	Reynaldo (from (Slovakia) Spartak Trnava)
—	FW	HAI	Jean-Eudes Maurice (from (Kazakhstan) Taraz)

Out: Note: Flags indicate national team as defined under FIFA eligibility rules; some limited exceptions apply. Players may hold more than one non-FIFA nationality.

No.	Pos.	Nation	Player
3	MF	CMR	Joseph Nane (to (Kazakhstan) Atyrau)
4	DF	UKR	Oleksandr Volovyk (to (Kazakhstan) Akzhayik)
7	MF	KAZ	Bauyrzhan Baitana (to (Kazakhstan) Taraz)
14	DF	KAZ	Berik Aitbayev (to (Kazakhstan) Irtysh Pavlodar)
18	MF	AUT	Tomáš Šimkovič (to (Lithuania) Žalgiris)
22	MF	KAZ	Kirill Shestakov (to (Kazakhstan) Irtysh Pavlodar)
30	DF	SVK	Kristián Kolčák (to (Hungary) Szombathelyi Haladás)
31	MF	KAZ	Abay Zhunusov (loan return to (Kazakhstan) Astana)
32	GK	KAZ	Samat Otarbayev (to (Kazakhstan) Atyrau)
45	DF	SRB	Slobodan Simović (to (Belarus) BATE Borisov)
50	FW	MKD	Dušan Savić (to (Serbia) Zemun)
66	MF	KAZ	Rakhimzhan Rozybakiev (to (Kazakhstan) Irtysh Pavlodar)
77	MF	MKD	Muarem Muarem (to (Albania) Flamurtari Vlorë)
86	FW	MNE	Marko Obradović (to (Russia) Yenisey Krasnoyarsk)
87	FW	BLR	Ihar Zyankovich (to (Kazakhstan) Atyrau)
—	MF	GEO	Jaba Jighauri (loan to (Kazakhstan) Ordabasy)

=== Akzhayik ===
In: Note: Flags indicate national team as defined under FIFA eligibility rules; some limited exceptions apply. Players may hold more than one non-FIFA nationality.

No.	Pos.	Nation	Player
1	GK	KAZ	Serhiy Tkachuk
3	DF	UKR	Oleksandr Volovyk (from (Kazakhstan) Aktobe)
6	DF	KAZ	Sergey Keyler (from (Kazakhstan) Okzhetpes)
9	FW	KAZ	Samit Chulagov (loan return from (Kazakhstan) Makhtaaral)
10	MF	KAZ	Yerkebulan Nurgaliyev (from (Kazakhstan) Okzhetpes)
11	FW	KAZ	Yedige Oralbai (from (Kazakhstan) Makhtaaral)
17	MF	UKR	Andriy Tkachuk (from (Ukraine) Vorskla Poltava)
23	MF	UKR	Ihor Khudobyak (from (Ukraine) Karpaty Lviv)
44	DF	UKR	Yuriy Putrash
45	FW	UKR	Aderinsola Eseola (loan from (Ukraine) Zirka Kropyvnytskyi)
66	GK	UKR	Yevhen Borovyk (from (Bulgaria) Cherno More)
77	DF	KAZ	Berik Shaikhov (from (Kazakhstan) Astana)
87	DF	UKR	Serhiy Basov (from (Ukraine) Oleksandriya)
—	DF	KAZ	Bauyrzhan Omarov (from (Kazakhstan) Kaisar)
—	MF	BRA	Júnior (from (Portugal) Gafanha)
—	MF	KAZ	Oleg Nedashkovsky (from (Kazakhstan) Okzhetpes)
—	MF	UKR	Maksym Feshchuk (from (Kazakhstan) Taraz)

Out: Note: Flags indicate national team as defined under FIFA eligibility rules; some limited exceptions apply. Players may hold more than one non-FIFA nationality.

No.	Pos.	Nation	Player
6	MF	MNE	Jovan Nikolić (to (Montenegro) Mladost Podgorica)
10	MF	COL	Jhoan Arenas (to (Venezuela) Puerto Cabello)
11	FW	MNE	Marko Đurović (to (Montenegro) Lovćen)
12	MF	KAZ	Konstantin Zarechny
14	MF	KAZ	Alibek Ayaganov (to (Kazakhstan) Kyzylzhar)
15	DF	KAZ	Dmitry Shmidt (to (Kazakhstan) Irtysh Pavlodar)
16	MF	PAR	Freddy Coronel (to (Kazakhstan) Kyzylzhar)
27	DF	KAZ	Andrey Shabaev (to (Kazakhstan) Kyzylzhar)
28	MF	KAZ	Yuriy Pertsukh (to (Kazakhstan) Astana)
30	MF	CRO	Denis Glavina (to (Kazakhstan) Atyrau)
33	GK	KAZ	Vyacheslav Kotlyar (to (Kazakhstan) Tobol)
55	MF	SRB	Predrag Govedarica (to (Kazakhstan) Taraz)

=== Astana ===
In: Note: Flags indicate national team as defined under FIFA eligibility rules; some limited exceptions apply. Players may hold more than one non-FIFA nationality.

No.	Pos.	Nation	Player
8	MF	BIH	Srđan Grahovac (from (Austria) Rapid Wien, previously on loan)
19	MF	KAZ	Baktiyar Zaynutdinov (from (Kazakhstan) Taraz)
28	MF	KAZ	Yuriy Pertsukh (from (Kazakhstan) Akzhayik)
31	MF	KAZ	Abay Zhunusov (loan return from (Kazakhstan) Aktobe)
88	MF	SRB	Marko Stanojević (from (Kazakhstan) Shakhter Karagandy)
99	FW	KAZ	Aleksey Shchotkin (loan return from (Kazakhstan) Tobol)

Out: Note: Flags indicate national team as defined under FIFA eligibility rules; some limited exceptions apply. Players may hold more than one non-FIFA nationality.

No.	Pos.	Nation	Player
8	MF	BIH	Srđan Grahovac (loan to (Croatia) Rijeka)
10	FW	ALB	Azdren Llullaku (to (Italy) Virtus Entella, previously on loan to (Kazakhstan) Tobol)
17	MF	KAZ	Askhat Tagybergen (to (Kazakhstan) Kaisar)
21	DF	KAZ	Berik Shaikhov (to (Kazakhstan) Akzhayik)
22	MF	KAZ	Gevorg Najaryan (to (Kazakhstan) Shakhter Karagandy, previously on loan)
30	FW	COD	Junior Kabananga (to (Saudi Arabia) Al-Nassr)
73	MF	KAZ	Didar Zhalmukan (loan to (Kazakhstan) Ordabasy, previously on loan to (Kazakhstan) Tobol)

=== Atyrau ===
In: Note: Flags indicate national team as defined under FIFA eligibility rules; some limited exceptions apply. Players may hold more than one non-FIFA nationality.

No.	Pos.	Nation	Player
1	GK	KAZ	Vladimir Loginovsky (from (Kazakhstan) Taraz)
3	MF	CMR	Joseph Nane (from (Kazakhstan) Aktobe)
4	DF	CRO	Tomislav Barbarić (from (Croatia) Rudeš)
7	MF	KGZ	Anton Zemlianukhin
9	FW	KAZ	Alexey Rodionov
11	DF	KAZ	Ruslan Zhanysbayev (from (Kazakhstan) Caspiy)
17	FW	NGA	Tunde Adeniji (from (Bulgaria) Levski Sofia)
23	MF	KAZ	Piraliy Aliev (from (Kazakhstan) Irtysh Pavlodar)
30	DF	SRB	Stefan Živković (from (Kazakhstan) Irtysh Pavlodar)
75	DF	KAZ	Kuanysh Eltzerov
78	FW	BLR	Ihar Zyankovich (from (Kazakhstan) Aktobe)

Out: Note: Flags indicate national team as defined under FIFA eligibility rules; some limited exceptions apply. Players may hold more than one non-FIFA nationality.

No.	Pos.	Nation	Player
3	DF	GEO	Ucha Lobjanidze (to (Georgia (country)) Samtredia)
4	MF	CRO	Jure Obšivač (to (Romania) Sepsi Sfântu Gheorghe)
7	MF	KAZ	Alisher Suley (to (Kazakhstan) Ordabasy)
8	MF	UZB	Shavkat Salomov (to (Uzbekistan) Buxoro)
9	FW	GEO	Vladimir Dvalishvili (to (Israel) Hapoel Ashkelon)
11	MF	KAZ	Aleksei Marov
17	MF	KAZ	Almas Armenov
19	MF	SRB	Jovan Đokić (to (Uzbekistan) AGMK)
21	MF	KAZ	Nauryzbek Zhagorov
26	GK	KAZ	Nurbolat Kalmenov
27	FW	KAZ	Bekzhan Abdrakhman (to (Kazakhstan) Ordabasy)
28	DF	KAZ	Zakhar Korobov
32	FW	KAZ	Daurenbek Tazhimbetov (to (Kazakhstan) Kaisar)
34	GK	KAZ	Zhasur Narzikulov (to (Kazakhstan) Ordabasy)
95	DF	KAZ	Zhaksylyk Halelov

=== Irtysh ===
In: Note: Flags indicate national team as defined under FIFA eligibility rules; some limited exceptions apply. Players may hold more than one non-FIFA nationality.

No.	Pos.	Nation	Player
1	GK	KAZ	Almat Bekbaev (from (Kazakhstan) Ordabasy)
6	MF	KAZ	Rakhimzhan Rozybakiev (from (Kazakhstan) Aktobe)
14	DF	KAZ	Berik Aitbayev (from (Kazakhstan) Aktobe)
15	MF	BLR	Syarhey Kislyak (from (Turkey) Gaziantepspor)
16	DF	ESP	Adri (loan from (Spain) Albacete)
19	DF	KAZ	Maksat Amirkhanov (from (Kazakhstan) Taraz)
22	MF	KAZ	Kirill Shestakov (from (Kazakhstan) Aktobe)
24	DF	KAZ	Dmitry Shmidt (from (Kazakhstan) Akzhayik)
39	FW	NGA	Gbolahan Salami (from (Finland) KuPS)
59	MF	ROU	Doru Popadiuc (from (Romania) Voluntari)
65	DF	ROU	Adrian Avrămia (from (Belarus) Dynamo Brest)
—	DF	KAZ	Midat Galbaev (from (Moldova) Zimbru Chișinău)
—	FW	HON	Eddie Hernández (from (Honduras) Motagua)

Out: Note: Flags indicate national team as defined under FIFA eligibility rules; some limited exceptions apply. Players may hold more than one non-FIFA nationality.

No.	Pos.	Nation	Player
1	GK	KAZ	David Loria (to (Kazakhstan) Aktobe)
2	DF	KAZ	Ilya Vorotnikov
3	DF	KAZ	Vladislav Chernyshov
5	MF	KAZ	Piraliy Aliev (to (Kazakhstan) Atyrau)
7	MF	KAZ	Aslan Darabayev (to (Kazakhstan) Tobol)
8	MF	BRA	Rodrigo António
11	FW	CIV	Béko Fofana (loan return to (Serbia) Čukarički)
15	MF	KAZ	Madiyar Ramazanov
22	FW	KAZ	Dmitri Rybalko (released, previously on loan to (Kazakhstan) Makhtaaral)
28	DF	KAZ	Damir Dautov (to (Kazakhstan) Ordabasy)
30	DF	SRB	Stefan Živković (to (Kazakhstan) Atyrau)
33	MF	KAZ	Kazbek Geteriev
60	MF	KAZ	Miras Tuliyev
72	DF	SRB	Mario Maslać (to (Latvia) Riga FC)
84	FW	MDA	Igor Bugaiov
89	GK	KAZ	Anton Tsirin (to (Kazakhstan) Kyzylzhar)
94	MF	UKR	Vladyslav Ohirya (to (Ukraine) Desna Chernihiv)
—	DF	KAZ	Nursultan Alibayov (released, previously on loan to (Kazakhstan) Ekibastuz)
—	DF	KAZ	Igor Nazarov (released, previously on loan to (Kazakhstan) Kaisar)
—	DF	KAZ	Dauren Orymbay (released, previously on loan to (Kazakhstan) Ekibastuz)
—	MF	KAZ	Yuri Chifin (released, previously on loan to (Kazakhstan) Ekibastuz)
—	MF	KAZ	Bagdat Urazaliev (released, previously on loan to (Kazakhstan) Ekibastuz)
—	FW	KAZ	Muratkhan Zeynollin (released, previously on loan to (Kazakhstan) Shakhter Karagandy)

=== Kairat ===
In: Note: Flags indicate national team as defined under FIFA eligibility rules; some limited exceptions apply. Players may hold more than one non-FIFA nationality.

No.	Pos.	Nation	Player
4	DF	TRI	Sheldon Bateau (loan extended from (Russia) Krylia Sovetov)
11	FW	URU	Hugo Silveira (loan from (Uruguay) Nacional)
19	MF	ISR	Gai Assulin (from (Spain) Sabadell)
26	DF	CIV	Cédric Gogoua (from (Kazakhstan) Kairat-A)

Out: Note: Flags indicate national team as defined under FIFA eligibility rules; some limited exceptions apply. Players may hold more than one non-FIFA nationality.

No.	Pos.	Nation	Player
2	DF	KAZ	Timur Rudoselskiy
6	DF	SRB	Žarko Marković
11	FW	CIV	Gerard Gohou (to (China) Beijing Enterprises)
13	DF	KAZ	Yermek Kuantayev (loan from (Kazakhstan) Zhetysu)
14	DF	ESP	César Arzo (to (Spain) Gimnàstic)
15	MF	KAZ	Bauyrzhan Turysbek (to (Kazakhstan) Tobol)
16	MF	KAZ	Oybek Baltabaev (loan to (Kazakhstan) Altai Semey)
22	FW	KAZ	Rifat Nurmugamet (loan extended to (Kazakhstan) Zhetysu)
—	FW	CIV	Mohamed Konaté (to (Belarus) Gomel)

=== Kaisar ===
In: Note: Flags indicate national team as defined under FIFA eligibility rules; some limited exceptions apply. Players may hold more than one non-FIFA nationality.

No.	Pos.	Nation	Player
5	DF	KAZ	Mark Gorman (from (Kazakhstan) Tobol)
8	MF	KAZ	Askhat Tagybergen (from (Kazakhstan) Astana)
17	MF	KEN	Paul Were (from (Greece) Kalamata)
18	FW	KAZ	Daurenbek Tazhimbetov (to (Kazakhstan) Atyrau)
22	DF	KAZ	Aleksandr Marochkin (from (Kazakhstan) Okzhetpes)
76	FW	MTQ	Yoann Arquin

Out: Note: Flags indicate national team as defined under FIFA eligibility rules; some limited exceptions apply. Players may hold more than one non-FIFA nationality.

No.	Pos.	Nation	Player
8	MF	KAZ	Ruslan Sakhalbayev
11	FW	KAZ	Elzhas Altynbekov (to (Kazakhstan) Zhetysu)
17	MF	KAZ	Zhambyl Kukeyev
22	DF	KAZ	Bauyrzhan Omarov (to (Kazakhstan) Akzhayik)
31	DF	KAZ	Aleksei Muldarov (to (Kazakhstan) Kyzylzhar)
39	MF	BDI	Saidi Ntibazonkiza
77	FW	KAZ	Toktar Zhangylyshbay (loan return to (Kazakhstan) Tobol)
90	FW	SRB	Milan Bojović (to (Kazakhstan) Zhetysu)
—	DF	KAZ	Igor Nazarov (loan return to (Kazakhstan) Irtysh Pavlodar)

=== Kyzylzhar ===
In: Note: Flags indicate national team as defined under FIFA eligibility rules; some limited exceptions apply. Players may hold more than one non-FIFA nationality.

No.	Pos.	Nation	Player
1	GK	KAZ	Anton Tsirin (from (Kazakhstan) Irtysh Pavlodar)
2	DF	GEO	Giorgi Popkhadze (from (Georgia (country)) Dila Gori)
3	DF	KAZ	Aleksei Muldarov (from (Kazakhstan) Kaisar)
5	MF	GEO	Gogita Gogua (from (Kazakhstan) Okzhetpes)
6	MF	KAZ	Alibek Ayaganov (from (Kazakhstan) Akzhayik)
9	MF	KAZ	Sergei Skorykh (from (Kazakhstan) Shakhter Karagandy)
10	MF	GEO	Shota Grigalashvili (from (Uzbekistan) AGMK)
13	FW	SRB	Bratislav Punoševac (from (Moldova) Dacia Chișinău)
16	MF	PAR	Freddy Coronel (from (Kazakhstan) Akzhayik)
21	MF	MNE	Uroš Delić (from (Serbia) Borac Čačak)
25	DF	BUL	Mihail Venkov (from (Bulgaria) Slavia Sofia)
27	DF	KAZ	Andrey Shabaev (from (Kazakhstan) Akzhayik)

Out: Note: Flags indicate national team as defined under FIFA eligibility rules; some limited exceptions apply. Players may hold more than one non-FIFA nationality.

No.	Pos.	Nation	Player
—	DF	MLI	Mamoutou Coulibaly
—	DF	SRB	Nikola Tasic

=== Ordabasy ===
In: Note: Flags indicate national team as defined under FIFA eligibility rules; some limited exceptions apply. Players may hold more than one non-FIFA nationality.

No.	Pos.	Nation	Player
1	GK	KAZ	Bekhan Shayzada
2	DF	KAZ	Bakdaoulet Kozhabaev
5	DF	KAZ	Damir Dautov (from (Kazakhstan) Irtysh Pavlodar)
14	MF	KAZ	Samat Shamshi (from (Kazakhstan) Kyran)
18	MF	KAZ	Bekzhan Abdrakhman (from (Kazakhstan) Atyrau)
19	MF	KAZ	Abylkhar Zulfikarov
27	MF	KAZ	Timur Dosmagambetov (from (Kazakhstan) Okzhetpes)
31	MF	GEO	Jaba Jighauri (from (Kazakhstan) Aktobe)
34	GK	KAZ	Zhasur Narzikulov (from (Kazakhstan) Atyrau)
44	DF	CRO	Hrvoje Spahija (from (Romania) Universitatea Craiova)
70	FW	UZB	Ivan Nagaev (from (Uzbekistan) Buxoro)
77	DF	KAZ	Talgat Adyrbekov (loan return from (Kazakhstan) Okzhetpes)
91	FW	KAZ	Sergei Khizhnichenko (from (Kazakhstan) Shakhter Karagandy)
95	FW	KAZ	Alisher Suley (from (Kazakhstan) Atyrau)
—	MF	ARG	Facundo Bertoglio (from (Cyprus) APOEL)
—	MF	KAZ	Didar Zhalmukan (loan from (Kazakhstan) Astana)

Out: Note: Flags indicate national team as defined under FIFA eligibility rules; some limited exceptions apply. Players may hold more than one non-FIFA nationality.

No.	Pos.	Nation	Player
1	GK	KAZ	Almat Bekbaev (to (Kazakhstan) Irtysh Pavlodar)
2	DF	KAZ	Baudaulet Kozhabayev
4	DF	KAZ	Mukhtar Mukhtarov
7	FW	KAZ	Tanat Nusserbayev (to (Kazakhstan) Tobol)
8	MF	KAZ	Samat Smakov (Retired)
10	MF	KAZ	Kairat Ashirbekov
13	MF	KAZ	Azat Nurgaliev (to (Kazakhstan) Tobol)
18	MF	CRO	Oliver Petrak (to (Poland) Korona Kielce)
23	GK	BLR	Valery Fomichev
25	GK	KAZ	Ramil Nurmukhametov (to (Kazakhstan) Aktobe)
29	GK	KAZ	Sergey Boychenko (to (Kazakhstan) Okzhetpes)
30	MF	KAZ	Sanat Zhumahanov
33	FW	BUL	Preslav Yordanov (to (Bulgaria) Pirin Blagoevgrad)
50	MF	UZB	Alexander Geynrikh (to (Kazakhstan) Aktobe)
55	DF	KAZ	Farkhadbek Irismetov (to (Kazakhstan) Altai Semey)
77	FW	SRB	Srđan Vujaklija (to (South Korea) Gwangju)
81	MF	COL	Roger Cañas (to (Belarus) Shakhtyor Soligorsk)
87	DF	SRB	Aleksandar Simčević (on loan to (Kazakhstan) Aktobe)
88	MF	KAZ	Bekzat Beisenov
—	GK	KAZ	Yaroslav Bondarenko

=== Shakhter Karagandy ===
In: Note: Flags indicate national team as defined under FIFA eligibility rules; some limited exceptions apply. Players may hold more than one non-FIFA nationality.

No.	Pos.	Nation	Player
3	DF	UKR	Yevhen Tkachuk (from (Ukraine) Stal Kamianske)
5	DF	KAZ	Kirill Pasichnik (from (Uzbekistan) Buxoro)
7	FW	KAZ	Sergei Shaff (from (Kazakhstan) Okzhetpes)
8	MF	BLR	Alyaksandr Valadzko (from (Belarus) BATE Borisov)
10	MF	MNE	Damir Kojašević (from (Serbia) Vojvodina)
13	MF	UKR	Oleksandr Mihunov (from (Ukraine) Shakhtar Donetsk)
21	MF	KAZ	Madi Zhakypbayev (from (Kazakhstan) Astana)
27	MF	CZE	Egon Vůch (from (Kazakhstan) Tobol)
31	FW	SUI	Danijel Subotić (from (South Korea) Ulsan Hyundai)
77	MF	KAZ	Gevorg Najaryan (from (Kazakhstan) Astana, previously on loan)

Out: Note: Flags indicate national team as defined under FIFA eligibility rules; some limited exceptions apply. Players may hold more than one non-FIFA nationality.

No.	Pos.	Nation	Player
1	GK	KAZ	Yaroslav Baginskiy
5	MF	CZE	Jiří Valenta (loan return to (Czech Republic) Mladá Boleslav)
8	DF	KAZ	Viktor Dmitrenko (loan return to (Kazakhstan) Tobol)
11	MF	KAZ	Vladislav Vasiliev (to (Belarus) Energetik-BGU Minsk)
13	DF	ENG	Korede Aiyegbusi
15	MF	CZE	Jakub Chleboun (loan return to (Czech Republic) Hradec Králové)
18	MF	SVK	Štefan Zošák (to (Slovakia) Poprad)
20	FW	KAZ	Sergei Khizhnichenko
21	MF	KAZ	Grigori Dubkov
27	MF	SVK	Július Szöke (to (Belarus) Shakhtyor Soligorsk)
33	MF	KAZ	Sergei Skorykh (to (Kazakhstan) Kyzylzhar)
44	MF	KAZ	Kuanysh Ermekov
88	MF	SRB	Marko Stanojević (to (Kazakhstan) Astana)
—	FW	KAZ	Muratkhan Zeynollin (loan return to (Kazakhstan) Irtysh Pavlodar)

=== Tobol ===
In: Note: Flags indicate national team as defined under FIFA eligibility rules; some limited exceptions apply. Players may hold more than one non-FIFA nationality.

No.	Pos.	Nation	Player
8	DF	KAZ	Viktor Dmitrenko (loan return from (Kazakhstan) Shakhter Karagandy)
11	MF	KAZ	Aslan Darabayev (from (Kazakhstan) Irtysh Pavlodar)
13	MF	KAZ	Azat Nurgaliev (from (Kazakhstan) Ordabasy)
15	MF	KAZ	Bauyrzhan Turysbek (from (Kazakhstan) Kairat)
16	FW	KAZ	Toktar Zhangylyshbay (loan return from (Kazakhstan) Kaisar)
20	MF	GEO	Jaba Kankava
21	DF	KAZ	Sultan Abilgazy (from (Kazakhstan) Okzhetpes)
25	FW	UKR	Anton Shynder
33	GK	KAZ	Vyacheslav Kotlyar (from (Kazakhstan) Akzhayik)
77	MF	UKR	Vasyl Kobin (from (Ukraine) Veres Rivne)
96	MF	KAZ	Maxim Fedin (from (Kazakhstan) Okzhetpes)
—	FW	KAZ	Tanat Nusserbayev (from (Kazakhstan) Ordabasy)

Out: Note: Flags indicate national team as defined under FIFA eligibility rules; some limited exceptions apply. Players may hold more than one non-FIFA nationality.

No.	Pos.	Nation	Player
5	DF	KAZ	Mark Gorman (to (Kazakhstan) Kaisar)
10	FW	ALB	Azdren Llullaku (loan return from (Kazakhstan) Astana)
11	MF	KGZ	Raul Jalilov (to (Kazakhstan) Zhetysu)
15	FW	BIH	Amer Bekić (to (Bosnia and Herzegovina) Sloboda Tuzla)
20	MF	KAZ	Yevgeniy Levin
23	MF	CZE	Egon Vůch (to (Kazakhstan) Shakhter Karagandy)
35	GK	KAZ	Stanislav Pavlov
73	MF	KAZ	Didar Zhalmukan (loan return from (Kazakhstan) Astana)
77	MF	KAZ	Almir Mukhutdinov (to (Kazakhstan) Zhetysu)
99	FW	KAZ	Aleksey Shchotkin (loan return to (Kazakhstan) Astana)
—	FW	KAZ	Temirlan Elmurzaev

=== Zhetysu ===
In: Note: Flags indicate national team as defined under FIFA eligibility rules; some limited exceptions apply. Players may hold more than one non-FIFA nationality.

No.	Pos.	Nation	Player
3	DF	CRO	Denis Glavina (from (Kazakhstan) Akzhayik)
5	MF	ARM	Kamo Hovhannisyan (from (Armenia) Alashkert)
6	DF	GEO	Lasha Kasradze (from (Georgia (country)) Samtredia)
7	FW	KAZ	Elzhas Altynbekov (from (Kazakhstan) Kaisar)
9	FW	SRB	Milan Bojović (from (Kazakhstan) Kaisar)
10	MF	KGZ	Raul Jalilov (from (Kazakhstan) Tobol)
13	DF	KAZ	Yermek Kuantayev (loan from (Kazakhstan) Kairat)
14	MF	GHA	David Mawutor (from (Tajikistan) Istiklol)
17	MF	KAZ	Zhakyp Kozhamberdi (from (Kazakhstan) Taraz)
18	MF	ARM	Edgar Malakyan (from (Ukraine) Stal Kamianske)
20	DF	BLR	Ivan Sadownichy (from (Kazakhstan) Shakhter Karagandy)
22	FW	KAZ	Rifat Nurmugamet (loan extended from (Kazakhstan) Kairat)
24	GK	KAZ	Dzhurakhon Babakhanov (from (Kazakhstan) Taraz)
77	MF	KAZ	Almir Mukhutdinov (from (Kazakhstan) Tobol)
88	MF	LTU	Mantas Kuklys (from (Lithuania) Žalgiris)
89	GK	KAZ	Nurlybek Ayazbaev (from (Kazakhstan) Caspiy)
—	MF	SVN	Dino Martinović (from (Bulgaria) Lokomotiv Plovdiv)

Out: Note: Flags indicate national team as defined under FIFA eligibility rules; some limited exceptions apply. Players may hold more than one non-FIFA nationality.

No.	Pos.	Nation	Player
3	DF	MDA	Ștefan Burghiu
5	MF	KAZ	Adilet Abdenabi
6	FW	KAZ	Aleksey Shakin (to (Kazakhstan) Altai Semey)
8	DF	KAZ	Serik Sagyndykov
9	FW	KAZ	Vyacheslav Serdyukov
10	MF	KAZ	Vladimir Vyatkin
12	MF	UKR	Artem Kasyanov (to (Kazakhstan) Okzhetpes)
13	MF	KAZ	Adilkhan Tanzharikov
20	MF	KAZ	Evgeniy Levin
22	GK	KAZ	Alexander Rushinas
23	DF	KAZ	Askhat Baltabekov
25	GK	KAZ	Dmitry Kolbuntsov
29	DF	KAZ	Aset Doskaliev
44	DF	KAZ	Vladimir Pokatilov
80	FW	RUS	Atsamaz Burayev
88	GK	KAZ	Shyngyskhan Ahlasov
98	DF	KAZ	Rauan Orynbasar
