= List of Kazakhstan football transfers summer 2017 =

This is a list of Kazakh football transfers in the summer transfer window 2017 by club. Only clubs of the 2017 Kazakhstan Premier League are included, with the transfer window running from 13 June until 10 July 2017.

== Kazakhstan Premier League 2017 ==
=== Aktobe ===
In: Note: Flags indicate national team as defined under FIFA eligibility rules; some limited exceptions apply. Players may hold more than one non-FIFA nationality.

No.	Pos.	Nation	Player
3	MF	CMR	Joseph Nane (from (Kazakhstan) Okzhetpes)
18	MF	AUT	Tomáš Šimkovič (from (Kazakhstan) Tobol)
24	MF	KAZ	Ruslan Valiullin (from (Kazakhstan) Akzhayik)
30	DF	SVK	Kristián Kolčák (from (Hungary) Gyirmót)
31	MF	KAZ	Abay Zhunusov (loan from (Kazakhstan) Astana)
35	DF	FRA	Jérémy Faug-Porret (from (Switzerland) Servette)
45	MF	SRB	Slobodan Simović (from (Israel) Hapoel Kfar Saba)
50	FW	MKD	Dušan Savić (to (Kazakhstan) Tobol)
77	MF	MKD	Muarem Muarem (from (Azerbaijan) Qarabağ)
86	FW	MNE	Marko Obradović (from (Bosnia and Herzegovina) Radnik Bijeljina)
95	FW	KAZ	Abat Aimbetov

Out: Note: Flags indicate national team as defined under FIFA eligibility rules; some limited exceptions apply. Players may hold more than one non-FIFA nationality.

No.	Pos.	Nation	Player
6	DF	BRA	Juninho (to (Brazil) Vitória)
10	MF	BRA	Vitor Júnior (to (Brazil) ABC)
11	FW	BRA	Cassiano (loan return to (Brazil) Internacional)
12	DF	KAZ	Damir Dautov (to (Kazakhstan) Irtysh Pavlodar)
19	MF	ARG	Chaco Torres
30	DF	SEN	Papa Gueye
39	FW	BRA	Yuri Mamute (loan return to (Brazil) Grêmio)
42	GK	KAZ	Igor Trofimets
70	MF	KAZ	Abilkhan Abdukarimov
73	FW	UKR	Oleksandr Yermachenko

=== Akzhayik ===
In: Note: Flags indicate national team as defined under FIFA eligibility rules; some limited exceptions apply. Players may hold more than one non-FIFA nationality.

No.	Pos.	Nation	Player
9	FW	KAZ	Altynbek Daulethanov
14	MF	KAZ	Alibek Ayaganov (from (Kazakhstan) Okzhetpes)
30	MF	CRO	Denis Glavina (from (Kazakhstan) Tobol)
47		KAZ	Altynbek Imanbekov
83		KAZ	Girikhan Shadiev

Out: Note: Flags indicate national team as defined under FIFA eligibility rules; some limited exceptions apply. Players may hold more than one non-FIFA nationality.

No.	Pos.	Nation	Player
7	MF	KAZ	Ruslan Valiullin (to (Kazakhstan) Aktobe)
11	FW	CHI	Matías Rubio
14	DF	KAZ	Bauyrzhan Omarov (to (Kazakhstan) Kaisar)
34	MF	KAZ	Eduard Sergienko (to (Kazakhstan) Atyrau)

=== Astana ===
In: Note: Flags indicate national team as defined under FIFA eligibility rules; some limited exceptions apply. Players may hold more than one non-FIFA nationality.

No.	Pos.	Nation	Player
6	MF	HUN	László Kleinheisler (loan from (Germany) Werder Bremen)
9	FW	SRB	Đorđe Despotović (loan return from (Kazakhstan) Tobol)
14	MF	CRO	Marin Tomasov (loan from (Croatia) Rijeka)
17	MF	KAZ	Askhat Tagybergen (loan return from (Kazakhstan) Tobol)
21	DF	KAZ	Berik Shaikhov (loan return from (Kazakhstan) Okzhetpes)
25	DF	KAZ	Serhiy Malyi (loan return from (Kazakhstan) Tobol)
47	GK	KAZ	Abylaikhan Duysen (loan return from (Latvia) Spartaks Jūrmala)

Out: Note: Flags indicate national team as defined under FIFA eligibility rules; some limited exceptions apply. Players may hold more than one non-FIFA nationality.

No.	Pos.	Nation	Player
6	MF	SRB	Nemanja Maksimović (to (Spain) Valencia)
9	MF	MKD	Agim Ibraimi
10	FW	ALB	Azdren Llullaku (loan to (Kazakhstan) Tobol)
22	MF	KAZ	Gevorg Najaryan (loan to (Kazakhstan) Shakhter Karagandy)
31	MF	KAZ	Abay Zhunusov (loan to (Kazakhstan) Aktobe)
73	MF	KAZ	Didar Zhalmukan (loan to (Kazakhstan) Tobol)
88	MF	COL	Roger Cañas (to (Kazakhstan) Ordabasy, previously on loan at (Cyprus) APOEL)

=== Atyrau ===
In: Note: Flags indicate national team as defined under FIFA eligibility rules; some limited exceptions apply. Players may hold more than one non-FIFA nationality.

No.	Pos.	Nation	Player
5	DF	UKR	Rizvan Ablitarov (from (Ukraine) Chornomorets Odesa)
18	DF	KAZ	Alibek Sakenov
24		KAZ	Kuanish Eltezerov
32	FW	KAZ	Daurenbek Tazhimbetov (from (Kazakhstan) Shakhter Karagandy)
81	FW	SRB	Predrag Sikimić (from (Serbia) Red Star Belgrade)
82	MF	KAZ	Eduard Sergienko (from (Kazakhstan) Akzhayik)

Out: Note: Flags indicate national team as defined under FIFA eligibility rules; some limited exceptions apply. Players may hold more than one non-FIFA nationality.

No.	Pos.	Nation	Player
5	DF	SRB	Vukašin Tomić
18	MF	KAZ	Vitali Li (to (Kazakhstan) Ordabasy)
21	MF	KAZ	Nauryzbek Zhagorov
23	MF	KAZ	Miras Tuliyev (to (Kazakhstan) Irtysh Pavlodar)
55	FW	CRO	Ivan Rodić

=== Irtysh ===
In: Note: Flags indicate national team as defined under FIFA eligibility rules; some limited exceptions apply. Players may hold more than one non-FIFA nationality.

No.	Pos.	Nation	Player
28	DF	KAZ	Damir Dautov (from (Kazakhstan) Aktobe)
38	DF	SRB	Miloš Stamenković (from (Ukraine) Stal Kamianske)
60	MF	KAZ	Miras Tuliyev (from (Kazakhstan) Atyrau)
72	DF	SRB	Mario Maslać (from (Serbia) Vojvodina)
84	FW	MDA	Igor Bugaiov (from (Moldova) Zaria Bălți)
94	MF	UKR	Vladyslav Ohirya (from (Ukraine) Oleksandriya)

Out: Note: Flags indicate national team as defined under FIFA eligibility rules; some limited exceptions apply. Players may hold more than one non-FIFA nationality.

No.	Pos.	Nation	Player
2	DF	KAZ	Ilya Vorotnikov (to (Kazakhstan) Taraz)
3	DF	KAZ	Vladislav Chernyshov
9	MF	KAZ	Nurbol Zhumaskaliyev (to (Kazakhstan) Tobol)
10	FW	CMR	Serge N'Ganbe
19	FW	CIV	Franck Dja Djédjé (to (Kazakhstan) Kaisar)
34	DF	UKR	Yevhen Tkachuk
50	DF	GEO	Lasha Dvali (loan return to (Poland) Śląsk Wrocław)

=== Kairat ===
In: Note: Flags indicate national team as defined under FIFA eligibility rules; some limited exceptions apply. Players may hold more than one non-FIFA nationality.

No.	Pos.	Nation	Player
29	DF	TRI	Sheldon Bateau (loan from (Russia) Krylia Sovetov)
—	DF	CIV	Cédric Gogoua (from (Latvia) Riga)
—	FW	CIV	Mohamed Konaté (from (Latvia) Babīte)

Out: Note: Flags indicate national team as defined under FIFA eligibility rules; some limited exceptions apply. Players may hold more than one non-FIFA nationality.

No.	Pos.	Nation	Player
8	MF	RUS	Mikhail Bakayev (to (Russia) Anzhi Makhachkala)

=== Kaisar ===
In: Note: Flags indicate national team as defined under FIFA eligibility rules; some limited exceptions apply. Players may hold more than one non-FIFA nationality.

No.	Pos.	Nation	Player
22	DF	KAZ	Bauyrzhan Omarov (from (Kazakhstan) Akzhayik)
77	FW	KAZ	Toktar Zhangylyshbay (from (Kazakhstan) Tobol)
90	FW	SRB	Milan Bojović (from (Serbia) Mladost Lučani)
99	FW	CIV	Franck Dja Djédjé (from (Kazakhstan) Irtysh Pavlodar)

Out: Note: Flags indicate national team as defined under FIFA eligibility rules; some limited exceptions apply. Players may hold more than one non-FIFA nationality.

No.	Pos.	Nation	Player
1	GK	KAZ	Anton Tsirin
2	DF	KAZ	Olzhas Altaev
99	FW	MNE	Stefan Nikolić (TO (Romania) Sepsi Sfântu Gheorghe)

=== Okzhetpes ===
In: Note: Flags indicate national team as defined under FIFA eligibility rules; some limited exceptions apply. Players may hold more than one non-FIFA nationality.

No.	Pos.	Nation	Player
2	DF	LTU	Georgas Freidgeimas (from (Lithuania) Žalgiris)
4	DF	KAZ	Rinat Abdulin (from (Kazakhstan) Ordabasy)
12	MF	GEO	Gogita Gogua (from (Kazakhstan) Ordabasy)
31	FW	BEL	Marvin Ogunjimi (from (Albania) Skënderbeu Korçë)
32	FW	KAZ	Alibek Buleshev (from (Kazakhstan) Ordabasy)
75	GK	KAZ	Vladislav Frolov
77	DF	KAZ	Talgat Adyrbekov (loan from (Kazakhstan) Ordabasy)
95		KAZ	Oleg Lebedev (DF)
—	MF	UKR	Vitaliy Hoshkoderya (from (Ukraine) Olimpik Donetsk)

Out: Note: Flags indicate national team as defined under FIFA eligibility rules; some limited exceptions apply. Players may hold more than one non-FIFA nationality.

No.	Pos.	Nation	Player
5	MF	CMR	Joseph Nane (to (Kazakhstan) Aktobe)
7	MF	KAZ	Yerkebulan Nurgaliyev
19	MF	KAZ	Demiyat Slambekov
20	DF	KAZ	Berik Shaikhov (loan return to (Kazakhstan) Astana)
22	MF	KAZ	Alibek Ayaganov (to (Kazakhstan) Akzhayik)
27	FW	RUS	Sergei Strukov
33	FW	BUL	Tsvetan Genkov

=== Ordabasy ===
In: Note: Flags indicate national team as defined under FIFA eligibility rules; some limited exceptions apply. Players may hold more than one non-FIFA nationality.

No.	Pos.	Nation	Player
9	MF	KAZ	Vitali Li (from (Kazakhstan) Atyrau)
18	MF	CRO	Oliver Petrak (from (Bosnia and Herzegovina) Zrinjski Mostar)
23	GK	BLR	Valery Fomichev (from (Belarus) Torpedo-BelAZ Zhodino)
77	FW	SRB	Srđan Vujaklija (from (Serbia) Red Star Belgrade)
81	MF	COL	Roger Cañas (from (Kazakhstan) Astana)

Out: Note: Flags indicate national team as defined under FIFA eligibility rules; some limited exceptions apply. Players may hold more than one non-FIFA nationality.

No.	Pos.	Nation	Player
5	DF	SRB	Zoran Rendulić
23	DF	KAZ	Rinat Abdulin (to (Kazakhstan) Okzhetpes)
27	FW	KAZ	Alibek Buleshev (to (Kazakhstan) Okzhetpes)
34	MF	GEO	Gogita Gogua (to (Kazakhstan) Okzhetpes)
77	DF	KAZ	Talgat Adyrbekov (loan to (Kazakhstan) Okzhetpes)
88	FW	GEO	Otar Martsvaladze (to (Georgia (country)) Dinamo Batumi)

=== Shakhter Karagandy ===
In: Note: Flags indicate national team as defined under FIFA eligibility rules; some limited exceptions apply. Players may hold more than one non-FIFA nationality.

No.	Pos.	Nation	Player
5	DF	CZE	Jiří Valenta (from (Czech Republic) Slovácko)
7	MF	KAZ	Gevorg Najaryan (loan from (Kazakhstan) Astana)
8	DF	KAZ	Viktor Dmitrenko (from (Kazakhstan) Tobol)
15	DF	CZE	Jakub Chleboun (from (Czech Republic) Hradec Králové)
20	FW	KAZ	Sergei Khizhnichenko (from (Belarus) Shakhtyor Soligorsk)
53	FW	KAZ	Bakhtiyar Gabdollin
55	DF	KAZ	Ruslan Alimbaev

Out: Note: Flags indicate national team as defined under FIFA eligibility rules; some limited exceptions apply. Players may hold more than one non-FIFA nationality.

No.	Pos.	Nation	Player
3	DF	BIH	Nikola Vasiljević
7	DF	CIV	Didier Kadio
10	FW	KAZ	Daurenbek Tazhimbetov (to (Kazakhstan) Atyrau)
20	DF	BLR	Ivan Sadownichy
21	MF	KAZ	Rinat Khairullin (to (Kazakhstan) Taraz)
25	GK	KAZ	Serhiy Tkachuk
99	FW	BEL	Alessio Allegria (to (Kazakhstan) Bolat)

=== Taraz ===
In: Note: Flags indicate national team as defined under FIFA eligibility rules; some limited exceptions apply. Players may hold more than one non-FIFA nationality.

No.	Pos.	Nation	Player
2	DF	KAZ	Vladislav Kuzmin
12	DF	KAZ	Ilya Vorotnikov (from (Kazakhstan) Irtysh Pavlodar)
27	MF	KAZ	Rinat Khairullin (from (Kazakhstan) Shakhter Karagandy)
88	DF	KAZ	Evgeni Goryachi (from (Kazakhstan) Baikonur)
99	FW	SEN	Malick Mané (from (China) Nei Mongol Zhongyou)

Out: Note: Flags indicate national team as defined under FIFA eligibility rules; some limited exceptions apply. Players may hold more than one non-FIFA nationality.

No.	Pos.	Nation	Player
2	DF	KAZ	Vladislav Kuzmin
5	DF	KAZ	Adlet Kenesbek
18	MF	KAZ	Maksim Azovskiy
23	FW	RUS	Ruslan Mukhametshin (to (Russia) Mordovia Saransk)
71	MF	KAZ	Madiyar Raimbek

=== Tobol ===
In: Note: Flags indicate national team as defined under FIFA eligibility rules; some limited exceptions apply. Players may hold more than one non-FIFA nationality.

No.	Pos.	Nation	Player
3	DF	MKD	Vanče Šikov (from (North Macedonia) Rabotnički)
9	MF	KAZ	Nurbol Zhumaskaliyev (from (Kazakhstan) Irtysh Pavlodar)
10	FW	ALB	Azdren Llullaku (loan from (Kazakhstan) Astana)
15	FW	BIH	Amer Bekić (from (Bosnia and Herzegovina) Sarajevo)
21	MF	GEO	Nika Kvekveskiri (from (Azerbaijan) Gabala)
23	MF	CZE	Egon Vůch (from (Czech Republic) Viktoria Plzeň)
73	MF	KAZ	Didar Zhalmukan (loan from (Kazakhstan) Astana)
—	MF	KAZ	Evgeny Levin (loan from (Kazakhstan) Astana)

Out: Note: Flags indicate national team as defined under FIFA eligibility rules; some limited exceptions apply. Players may hold more than one non-FIFA nationality.

No.	Pos.	Nation	Player
3	MF	CRO	Denis Glavina (to (Kazakhstan) Akzhayik)
8	DF	KAZ	Viktor Dmitrenko (to (Kazakhstan) Shakhter Karagandy)
10	FW	MKD	Dušan Savić (to (Kazakhstan) Aktobe)
16	FW	KAZ	Toktar Zhangylyshbay (to (Kazakhstan) Kaisar)
25	DF	KAZ	Serhiy Malyi (loan return to (Kazakhstan) Tobol)
32	FW	SRB	Đorđe Despotović (loan return to (Kazakhstan) Astana)
81	MF	AUT	Tomáš Šimkovič (to (Kazakhstan) Aktobe)
88	MF	KAZ	Askhat Tagybergen (loan return to (Kazakhstan) Astana)
