= 2017 FC Shakhter Karagandy season =

FC Shakhter Karagandy
2017 season
- Chairman: Sergei Yegorov
- Manager: Aleksei Yeryomenko (until 29 May); Saulius Širmelis (from 2 June)
- Stadium: Shakhter Stadium
- Premier League: 7th
- Kazakhstan Cup: Semifinal vs Atyrau
- Top goalscorer: League: Milan Stojanović (10); All: Milan Stojanović (10)
Home colours	Away colours	Third colours

In 2017, FC Shakhter Karagandy played its 26th successive season in the Kazakhstan Premier League, the highest tier of association football in Kazakhstan. Shakhter Karagandy also participated in the Kazakhstan Cup.

== Season events ==
Shakhter Karagandy's away game against Aktobe on 22 April was postponed as Aktobes pitch at their stadium was not ready after an extended period of winter weather.

On 29 May, Aleksei Yeryomenko was fired as the club's manager, with Saulius Shirmyalisa being appointed as the club's manager on 2 June.

== Squad ==
As of 11 July 2017

Note: Flags indicate national team as defined under FIFA eligibility rules; some limited exceptions apply. Players may hold more than one non-FIFA nationality.

No.	Pos.	Nation	Player
1	GK	KAZ	Yaroslav Baginskiy
4	DF	KAZ	Mikhail Gabyshev
5	MF	CZE	Jiří Valenta
6	DF	KAZ	Ilnur Mangutkin
7	MF	KAZ	Gevorg Najaryan (loan from Astana)
8	DF	KAZ	Viktor Dmitrenko (loan from Tobol)
9	FW	KAZ	Aidos Tattybayev
11	MF	KAZ	Vladislav Vasiliev
13	DF	ENG	Korede Aiyegbusi
15	DF	CZE	Jakub Chleboun (loan from Hradec Králové)
17	FW	KAZ	Oralkhan Omirtayev
18	MF	SVK	Štefan Zošák
19	DF	KAZ	Yevgeny Tarasov
20	FW	KAZ	Sergei Khizhnichenko

No.	Pos.	Nation	Player
22	MF	KAZ	Marat Shakhmetov
24	MF	SRB	Milan Stojanović
27	MF	SVK	Július Szöke
30	GK	KAZ	Igor Shatskiy
32	MF	KAZ	Maxim Kazanin
33	MF	KAZ	Sergei Skorykh
34	DF	KAZ	Igor Pikalkin
44	MF	KAZ	Kuanysh Ermekov
53	FW	KAZ	Bakhtiyar Gabdollin
55	DF	KAZ	Ruslan Alimbaev
70	FW	KAZ	Jean-Ali Payruz
71	FW	KAZ	Vyacheslav Putintsev
77	MF	KAZ	Aidos Oral
88	MF	SRB	Marko Stanojević

== Transfers ==
=== Winter ===
In: Note: Flags indicate national team as defined under FIFA eligibility rules; some limited exceptions apply. Players may hold more than one non-FIFA nationality.

No.	Pos.	Nation	Player
6	DF	KAZ	Ilnur Mangutkin (from (Kazakhstan) Okzhetpes)
7	DF	CIV	Didier Kadio (from (India) Kerala Blasters)
10	FW	KAZ	Daurenbek Tazhimbetov (from (Kazakhstan) Taraz)
13	DF	ENG	Korede Aiyegbusi (from (Sweden) Eskilstuna)
21	MF	KAZ	Rinat Khairullin
22	MF	KAZ	Marat Shakhmetov (from (Kazakhstan) Akzhayik)
24	MF	SRB	Milan Stojanović (from (Serbia) Metalac)
32	MF	KAZ	Maxim Kazanin
77	MF	KAZ	Aidos Oral
88	MF	SRB	Marko Stanojević (from (Serbia) Rad)
99	FW	BEL	Alessio Allegria (from (Belgium) RFC Seraing)

Out: Note: Flags indicate national team as defined under FIFA eligibility rules; some limited exceptions apply. Players may hold more than one non-FIFA nationality.

No.	Pos.	Nation	Player
5	DF	ARM	Robert Arzumanyan (loan return to (Russia) Amkar Perm)
7	MF	NED	Desley Ubbink (to (Slovakia) Trenčín)
11	MF	KAZ	Maksat Baizhanov (to (Kazakhstan) Kaisar)
14	FW	KAZ	Andrei Finonchenko (Retired)
15	DF	KAZ	Gregory Dubkov
16	FW	KAZ	Sergey Vetrov
17	MF	KAZ	Aibar Nurybekov
24	FW	MKD	Marko Simonovski (to (Finland) Lahti)
77	DF	KAZ	Yevgeni Goryachi (to (Kazakhstan) Kaisar)
89	FW	SVK	Filip Serečin (to (Slovakia) Zemplín Michalovce)

=== Summer ===
In: Note: Flags indicate national team as defined under FIFA eligibility rules; some limited exceptions apply. Players may hold more than one non-FIFA nationality.

No.	Pos.	Nation	Player
5	DF	CZE	Jiří Valenta (from (Czech Republic) Slovácko)
7	MF	KAZ	Gevorg Najaryan (loan from (Kazakhstan) Astana)
8	DF	KAZ	Viktor Dmitrenko (loan from (Kazakhstan) Tobol)
15	DF	CZE	Jakub Chleboun (loan from (Czech Republic) Hradec Králové)
20	FW	KAZ	Sergei Khizhnichenko (from (Belarus) Shakhtyor Soligorsk)
53	FW	KAZ	Bakhtiyar Gabdollin
55	DF	KAZ	Ruslan Alimbaev

Out: Note: Flags indicate national team as defined under FIFA eligibility rules; some limited exceptions apply. Players may hold more than one non-FIFA nationality.

No.	Pos.	Nation	Player
3	DF	BIH	Nikola Vasiljević
7	DF	CIV	Didier Kadio
10	FW	KAZ	Daurenbek Tazhimbetov (to (Kazakhstan) Atyrau)
20	DF	BLR	Ivan Sadownichy
21	MF	KAZ	Rinat Khairullin (to (Kazakhstan) Taraz)
25	GK	KAZ	Serhiy Tkachuk
99	FW	BEL	Alessio Allegria (to (Kazakhstan) Bolat)

== Competitions ==
=== Kazakhstan Premier League ===
==== Results summary ====
Overall								Home						Away					
Pld	W	D	L	GF	GA	GD	Pts	W	D	L	GF	GA	GD	W	D	L	GF	GA	GD
33	12	4	17	36	50	−14	40	6	2	8	15	19	−4	6	2	9	21	31	−10

Last updated: 5 November 2017.
Source: See Results

==== Results by round ====
Round	1	2	3	4	5	6	7	8	9	10	11	12	13	14	15	16	17	18	19	20	21	22	23	24	25	26	27	28	29	30	31	32	33
Ground	A	A	H	H	A	A	H	H	A	H	H	A	A	A	H	A	A	H	A	H	A	H	H	A	A	H	A	A	H	H	A	A	A
Result	D	L	L	L	L	D	D	L	W	L	W	L	L	L	W	W	W	L	L	W	W	L	W	L	L	W	W	L	L	W	W	D	L
Position	6	7	11	11	11	11	11	11	11	12	11	11	12	12	11	9	7	7	8	7	6	7	6	8	8	6	6	7	7	6	6	6	7

Source: See Results
A = Away; H = Home; W = Win; D = Draw; L = Loss

==== Results ====
8 March 2017 1	Taraz	0 – 0	Shakhter Karagandy	Taraz
15:00 (UTC+6)	Ergashev (red card) 51'; M.Amirkhanov (yellow card) 64'	Report	Skorykh (yellow card) 6'; Aiyegbusi (yellow card) 54'; Tazhimbetov (yellow card) 90+3'	Stadium: Central Stadium; Attendance: 2,000; Referee: Igor Chesnokov

12 March 2017 2	Akzhayik	3 – 1	Shakhter Karagandy	Oral
16:00 (UTC+6)	Rubio 2'; Azuka 8' (pen.), 72'; M.Sapanov (yellow card) 21'; D.Tolebaev (yellow card) 87'	Report	Shatskiy (yellow card) 7'; Szöke (yellow card) 44'; Tazhimbetov 69'	Stadium: Petr Atoyan Stadium; Attendance: 3,500; Referee: Daniyar Sakhi

18 March 2017 3	Shakhter Karagandy	0 – 1	Kaisar	Astana
18:00 (UTC+6)	Tazhimbetov (yellow card) 9'; Stojanović (yellow card) 70'; M.Gabyshev (yellow card) 86'	Report	Arzhanov 23'; D.Yevstigneyev (yellow card) 80'; Ntibazonkiza (yellow card) 90+1'	Stadium: Astana Arena; Attendance: 2,000; Referee: Greorgiy Chekhovskiy

1 April 2017 4	Shakhter Karagandy	1 – 2	Astana	Temirtau
15:00 (UTC+6)	M.Gabyshev 62'	Report	Kabananga 88'; Mayewski (yellow card) 88'; Skorykh 90+2' (o.g.)	Stadium: Metallurg Stadium; Attendance: 1,500; Referee: Aleksandr Metallurg Stadium

8 April 2017 5	Shakhter Karagandy	1 – 4	Kairat	Temirtau
15:00 (UTC+6)	Stanojević (yellow card) 62'; A.Allegria 81'; Szöke (yellow card) 82'	Report	Isael 12'; Gohou 17', 19', 65'; Marković (yellow card) 30'	Stadium: Metallurg Stadium; Attendance: 1,000; Referee: Viktor Antonov

12 April 2017 6	Atyrau	3 – 3	Shakhter Karagandy	Atyrau
16:00 (UTC+6)	Salomov 28' (yellow card) 65'; Đokić (yellow card) 56'; Obšivač 77'; Skorykh 83' (o.g.)	Report	Tazhimbetov 11'; R.Khairullin 30'; Omirtayev 90+1'	Stadium: Munaishy Stadium; Attendance: 1,500; Referee: Furkhat Atazhanov

16 April 2017 7	Shakhter Karagandy	1 – 1	Tobol	Temirtau
15:00 (UTC+6)	Tazhimbetov 47' (yellow card) 90+3'; Kadio (red card) 90+3'	Report	Dmitrenko (yellow card) 22'; Skorykh 45+3' (o.g.); Moldakaraev (yellow card) 73'; Malyi (yellow card) 90+3'; Shchotkin (red card) 90+3'	Stadium: Metallurg Stadium; Attendance: 1,000; Referee: Bolat Karlibayev

22 April 2017 8	Aktobe	–	Shakhter Karagandy	Aktobe
(UTC+6)				Stadium: Central Stadium

29 April 2017 9	Shakhter Karagandy	1 – 2	Ordabasy	Temirtau
16:00 (UTC+6)	A.Tattybayev (yellow card) 48'; Shakhmetov 56'; Stanojević (yellow card) 81'	Report	Kovalchuk 3', 37'; T.Erlanov (yellow card) 75'	Stadium: Metallurg Stadium; Attendance: 1,500; Referee: Aydin Rakhimbayev

2 May 2017 10	Okzhetpes	0 – 2	Shakhter Karagandy	Astana
15:00 (UTC+6)	Fedin (yellow card) 68'	Report	Stojanović (yellow card) 6'; Stanojević (yellow card) 13'; A.Tattybayev 20', 71'; Szöke (yellow card) 29'	Stadium: Astana Arena; Attendance: 500; Referee: Viktor Antonov

6 May 2017 11	Shakhter Karagandy	0 – 1	Irtysh Pavlodar	Karaganda
16:00 (UTC+6)		Report	Aliev 4'; A.Darabayev (yellow card) 75'	Stadium: Shakhter Stadium; Attendance: 1,000; Referee: Denis Izmailov

14 May 2017 12	Shakhter Karagandy	1 – 0	Akzhayik	Temirtau
16:00 (UTC+6)	Aiyegbusi (yellow card) 16'; A.Allegria (yellow card) 34'; I.Pikalkin (yellow card) 45+1'; A.Tattybayev 82'	Report	D.Tolebaev (yellow card) 73'	Stadium: Metallurg Stadium; Attendance: 1,500; Referee: Furkat Atajanov

20 May 2017 13	Kaisar	2 – 1	Shakhter Karagandy	Kyzylorda
18:00 (UTC+6)	Kamara (yellow card) 26'; E.Altynbekov 53'; Arzhanov (yellow card) 60'; E.Goryachi (yellow card) 68'; Narzildaev (yellow card) 74'; Korobkin 83'	Report	Stanojević 24'; Y.Baginskiy (yellow card) 83'	Stadium: Gani Muratbayev Stadium; Attendance: 2,000; Referee: Bagdat Abdullaev

28 May 2017 14	Astana	4 – 1	Shakhter Karagandy	Astana
18:00 (UTC+6)	Kabananga 10', 19', 56'; Muzhikov 24'; Shitov (yellow card) 50'	Report	Kadio (yellow card) 29'; A.Tattybayev 52'; Szöke (yellow card) 62'	Stadium: Astana Arena; Attendance: 7,000; Referee: Daniyar Sakhi

3 June 2017 15	Kairat	4 – 1	Shakhter Karagandy	Almaty
(UTC+6)	Gohou 1', 39'; Zhukov (yellow card) 31'; Islamkhan 37'; Turysbek 82'	Report	Stojanović 86'	Stadium: Central Stadium; Attendance: 6,500; Referee: Bagdat Abdullaev

17 June 2017 16	Shakhter Karagandy	2 – 0	Atyrau	Temirtau
19:00 (UTC+6)	Stanojević 1', 89'	Report	R.Esatov (yellow card) 81'	Stadium: Metallurg Stadium; Attendance: 300; Referee: Grigory Moskovchenko

25 June 2017 17	Tobol	1 – 2	Shakhter Karagandy	Kostanay
19:00 (UTC+6)	G.Sartakov 27'; D.Miroshnichenko (yellow card) 43'; Zhangylyshbay (yellow card) 87'	Report	Shakhmetov (yellow card) 26' (goal) 80'; Stojanović 33'; Szöke (yellow card) 43'	Stadium: Stadion Zatobolets; Attendance: 2,000; Referee: Daniyar Sakhi

28 June 2017 8	Aktobe	0 – 1	Shakhter Karagandy	Aktobe
20:00 (UTC+6)	R.Rozybakiev (yellow card) 39'	Report	Y.Tarasov (yellow card) 8'; Stojanović 90' (pen.); Skorykh (yellow card) 55'; Szöke (yellow card) 66'; A.Tattybayev (yellow card) 90+6'	Stadium: Central Stadium; Attendance: 6,600; Referee: Denis Izmailov

2 July 2017 18	Shakhter Karagandy	0 – 2	Aktobe	Karaganda
19:00 (UTC+6)	Stanojević (yellow card) 13'; Aiyegbusi (yellow card) 51'; Dmitrenko (yellow card) 54'	Report	Zyankovich 24' (pen.), 28'; Shestakov (yellow card) 44'; A.Saulet (yellow card) 64'	Stadium: Shakhter Stadium; Attendance: 3,000; Referee: Marat Iskakov

9 July 2017 19	Ordabasy	1 – 0	Shakhter Karagandy	Shymkent
19:00 (UTC+6)	T.Erlanov (yellow card) 50'; Vujaklija 74'	Report	Stojanović (yellow card) 25'; Khizhnichenko (yellow card) 72'	Stadium: Kazhymukan Munaitpasov Stadium; Attendance: 2,500; Referee: Aydin Rakhimbayev

15 July 2017 20	Shakhter Karagandy	1 – 0	Okzhetpes	Karaganda
18:00 (UTC+6)	Szöke 13'; I.Pikalkin (yellow card) 45'; Stojanović (yellow card) 60'; M.Gabyshev (yellow card) 87'; Shakhmetov (yellow card) 90+3'	Report		Stadium: Shakhter Stadium; Attendance: 1,000; Referee: Igor Chesnokov

23 July 2017 21	Irtysh Pavlodar	1 – 2	Shakhter Karagandy	Pavlodar
19:00 (UTC+6)	Fonseca 20' (yellow card) 73'; Živković (yellow card) 45'	Report	Stanojević (yellow card) 39'; M.Gabyshev (yellow card) 45'; Stojanović 65'; Khizhnichenko 82' (yellow card) 83'	Stadium: Central Stadium; Attendance: 2,500; Referee: Aleksandr Gauzer

29 July 2017 22	Shakhter Karagandy	0 – 1	Taraz	Karaganda
18:00 (UTC+6)	Stanojević (yellow card) 30'	Report	Maurice 83'	Stadium: Shakhter Stadium; Attendance: 4,000; Referee: Timur Kumashev

12 August 2017 23	Shakhter Karagandy	2 – 1	Ordabasy	Karaganda
19:00 (UTC+6)	M.Gabyshev 62' (yellow card) 73'; Stojanović (yellow card) 65'; Szöke 80'	Report	Simčević (yellow card) 45+1'; Nurgaliev 60'	Stadium: Shakhter Stadium; Attendance: 3,000; Referee: Grigory Moskovchenko

20 August 2017 24	Kairat	3 – 1	Shakhter Karagandy	Almaty
20:00 (UTC+6)	Isael 53'; Gohou 68'; A.Sokolenko (yellow card) 78'; Akhmetov 85'	Report	Stanojević 42'; Y.Tarasov (yellow card) 82'	Stadium: Central Stadium; Attendance: 6,300; Referee: Daniyar Sakhi

27 August 2017 25	Shakhter Karagandy	v	Astana	Karaganda
(UTC+6)				Stadium: Shakhter Stadium

10 September 2017 26	Aktobe	2 – 0	Shakhter Karagandy	Aktobe
19:00 (UTC+6)	Valiullin 52'; Obradović (yellow card) 67' (goal) 81'; A.Shurigin (yellow card) 90+1'	Report	Szöke (yellow card) 35'; Dmitrenko (yellow card) 84'	Stadium: Central Stadium; Attendance: 12,000; Referee: Aydin Rakhimbayev

17 September 2017 27	Shakhter Karagandy	2 – 1	Okzhetpes	Karaganda
18:00 (UTC+6)	Stojanović 36' (pen.); Chleboun (yellow card) 69' (goal) 76'; M.Gabyshev (yellow card) 80'	Report	Abdulin (yellow card) 22' (yellow-red card) 34'; Buleshev 86' (pen.)	Stadium: Shakhter Stadium; Attendance: 2,00; Referee: Bolat Saryev

24 September 2017 28	Akzhayik	1 – 2	Shakhter Karagandy	Oral
18:00 (UTC+6)	A.Ersalimov 49'; Y.Pertsukh (yellow card) 61'	Report	Zošák 34'; Szöke (yellow card) 40'; Valenta (yellow card) 52'; Aiyegbusi 90+3'	Stadium: Petr Atoyan Stadium; Attendance: 2,700; Referee: Igor Aleshin

30 September 2017 29	Atyrau	3 – 1	Shakhter Karagandy	Atyrau
17:00 (UTC+6)	Ablitarov 14'; Maksimović 55'; E.Abdrakhmanov 71'; Đokić (yellow card) 75'; Dvalishvili (yellow card) 76'	Report	I.Pikalkin 22'; Shakhmetov (yellow card) 54'; Y.Tarasov (yellow card) 84'	Stadium: Munaishy Stadium; Attendance: 3,000; Referee: Georgiy Chekhovskiy

11 October 2017 25	Shakhter Karagandy	0 – 1	Astana	Temirtau
16:00 (UTC+6)	I.Mangutkin (yellow card) 70'	Report	Malyi (yellow card) 35'; Kabananga (yellow card) 40' (goal) 70' (pen.); Murtazayev (yellow card) 85'	Stadium: Metallurg Stadium; Attendance: 1,000; Referee: Furkhat Atazhanov

15 October 2017 30	Shakhter Karagandy	2 – 1	Kaisar	Karaganda
16:00 (UTC+6)	Dmitrenko (yellow card) 29'; Zošák 31'; Stojanović 47'	Report	Zhangylyshbay (yellow card) 43' (goal) 77'; Muldarov (yellow card) 60'; Coureur (yellow card) 90+3'	Stadium: Shakhter Stadium; Attendance: 1,500; Referee: Ruslan Omarov

21 October 2017 31	Taraz	2 – 3	Shakhter Karagandy	Taraz
16:00 (UTC+6)	B.Zaynutdinov 17', 28'; Diarra (yellow card) 42'; Kurgulin (yellow card) 81'; M.Amirkhanov (yellow card) 83'; Mijušković (yellow card) 85'	Report	Szöke (yellow card) 40'; Stojanović 50' (pen.), 76', 78'; I.Mangutkin (yellow card) 53'; K.Ermekov (yellow card) 67'; Shatskiy (yellow card) 90+5'	Stadium: Central Stadium; Attendance: 3,000; Referee: Timur Kumashev

28 October 2017 32	Shakhter Karagandy	1 – 1	Tobol	Karaganda
15:00 (UTC+6)	I.Pikalkin (yellow card) 70'; Chleboun (yellow card) 72' (yellow-red card) 86'; Stojanović 83' (pen.); A.Tattybayev (yellow card) 84'; M.Gabyshev (yellow card) 90+4'	Report	Moldakaraev 10'; D.Zhalmukan (yellow card) 41'; Žulpa (yellow card) 68'	Stadium: Shakhter Stadium; Attendance: 1,500; Referee: Aleksandr Gauzer

5 November 2017 33	Irtysh Pavlodar	1 – 0	Shakhter Karagandy	Pavlodar
15:00 (UTC+6)	Ohirya (yellow card) 60'; Fonseca 90+3' (yellow card) 90+3'	Report	Najaryan (yellow card) 77'	Stadium: Central Stadium; Attendance: 4,000; Referee: Aydin Rakhimbayev

==== League table ====
Pos	Team	Pld	W	D	L	GF	GA	GD	Pts	Qualification or relegation
5	Tobol	33	12	11	10	36	26	+10	47	Qualification for the Europa League first qualifying round (Note: Ordabasy would have qualified too, but they failed to obtain a licence, so Tobol took their place.)
6	Kaisar	33	11	9	13	30	36	−6	42	
7	Shakhter Karagandy	33	12	4	17	36	50	−14	40	
8	Atyrau (Note: Atyrau started the season with –9 points as a punishment for unpaid debts to former manager Zoran Filipović. On 24 April 2017, Atyrau had six points returned to after they cleared their debt to Filipović, with three points retained due to debts to Jonathas.)	33	10	8	15	34	54	−20	35	
9	Aktobe	33	8	9	16	38	46	−8	33	

Source: UEFA, Soccerway
Rules for classification: 1) Points; 2) Head-to-head points; 3) Head-to-head matches won; 4) Head-to-head goal difference; 5) Head-to-head goals scored; 6) Head-to-head away goals scored; 7) Goal difference; 8) Matches won; 9) Goals scored; 10) Away goals scored; 11) Draw.

=== Kazakhstan Cup ===
19 April 2017 Last 16	Tobol	1 – 2	Shakhter Karagandy	Kostanay
17:30 (UTC+6)	Kassaï (yellow card) 37'; Zhangylyshbay 85'	Summary	Szöke 15'; A.Tattybayev 39'; Skorykh (yellow card) 83'	Stadium: Central Stadium; Attendance: 2,000; Referee: Bagdat Abdullaev

10 May 2017 Quarterfinal	Okzhetpes	1 – 2	Shakhter Karagandy	Astana
17:00 (UTC+6)	Chertov (yellow card) 47'; S.Shaff 74'; Kozlov (yellow card) 90+4'	Report	Kadio 51'; Stanojević 54'; R.Khairullin (yellow card) 68'; Aiyegbusi (yellow card) 90+5'	Stadium: Astana Arena; Attendance: 700

24 May 2017 Semifinal 1st leg	Shakhter Karagandy	1 – 0	Atyrau	Temirtau
17:00 (UTC+6)	Tazhimbetov 17'; M.Gabyshev (yellow card) 64'	Report		Stadium: Metallurg Stadium; Attendance: 1,000; Referee: Aydin Rakhimbayev

21 June 2017 Semifinal 2nd leg	Atyrau	3 – 0 (3 – 1 agg.)	Shakhter Karagandy	Atyrau
19:00 (UTC+6)	Maksimović 47' (pen.); Dvalishvili 68' (yellow card) 71'; E.Abdrakhmanov (yellow card) 72'; Salomov (yellow card) 81'; D.Mazhitov (yellow card) 84'; A.Nurybekov 90'	Report	Szöke (yellow card) 47'; Shakhmetov (yellow card) 59'	Stadium: Munaishy Stadium; Attendance: 4,500; Referee: Aleksandr Aliyev

== Squad statistics ==
As of Match played 5 November 2017

=== Appearances and goals ===
No.	Pos	Nat	Player	Total		Premier League		Kazakhstan Cup	
No.	Pos	Nat	Player	Apps	Goals	Apps	Goals	Apps	Goals
1	GK	(Kazakhstan) KAZ	Yaroslav Baginskiy	7	0	5	0	2	0
4	DF	(Kazakhstan) KAZ	Mikhail Gabyshev	23	2	19+2	2	1+1	0
5	MF	(Czech Republic) CZE	Jiří Valenta	13	0	11+2	0	0	0
6	DF	(Kazakhstan) KAZ	Ilnur Mangutkin	7	0	7	0	0	0
7	MF	(Kazakhstan) KAZ	Gevorg Najaryan	9	0	0+9	0	0	0
8	DF	(Kazakhstan) KAZ	Viktor Dmitrenko	15	0	15	0	0	0
9	FW	(Kazakhstan) KAZ	Aidos Tattybayev	25	5	4+17	4	2+2	1
11	MF	(Kazakhstan) KAZ	Vladislav Vasiliev	7	0	2+4	0	1	0
13	DF	(England) ENG	Korede Aiyegbusi	23	1	20	1	3	0
15	DF	(Czech Republic) CZE	Jakub Chleboun	14	1	14	1	0	0
17	FW	(Kazakhstan) KAZ	Oralkhan Omirtayev	16	1	0+15	1	0+1	0
18	MF	(Slovakia) SVK	Štefan Zošák	33	2	29	2	4	0
19	DF	(Kazakhstan) KAZ	Yevgeny Tarasov	19	0	18	0	1	0
20	FW	(Kazakhstan) KAZ	Sergei Khizhnichenko	18	1	18	1	0	0
22	MF	(Kazakhstan) KAZ	Marat Shakhmetov	27	2	15+8	2	4	0
24	MF	(Serbia) SRB	Milan Stojanović	31	10	22+6	10	1+2	0
27	MF	(Slovakia) SVK	Július Szöke	29	3	26	2	3	1
30	GK	(Kazakhstan) KAZ	Igor Shatskiy	30	0	28	0	2	0
33	MF	(Kazakhstan) KAZ	Sergei Skorykh	23	0	16+4	0	3	0
34	DF	(Kazakhstan) KAZ	Igor Pikalkin	20	1	14+5	1	0+1	0
44	MF	(Kazakhstan) KAZ	Kuanysh Ermekov	5	0	2+3	0	0	0
55	DF	(Kazakhstan) KAZ	Ruslan Alimbaev	11	0	6+1	0	3+1	0
77	MF	(Kazakhstan) KAZ	Aidos Oral	1	0	0	0	0+1	0
88	MF	(Serbia) SRB	Marko Stanojević	32	5	26+2	4	4	1
Players away from Shakhter Karagandy on loan:
Players who left Shakhter Karagandy during the season:
3	DF	(Bosnia and Herzegovina) BIH	Nikola Vasiljević	5	0	4	0	1	0
7	DF	(Ivory Coast) CIV	Didier Kadio	15	1	11+1	0	3	1
10	FW	(Kazakhstan) KAZ	Daurenbek Tazhimbetov	17	4	11+3	3	2+1	1
21	MF	(Kazakhstan) KAZ	Rinat Khairullin	11	1	5+3	1	2+1	0
99	FW	(Belgium) BEL	Alessio Allegria	13	1	8+4	1	1	0

=== Goal scorers ===
Place	Position	Nation	Number	Name	Premier League	Kazakhstan Cup	Total
1	MF	(Serbia)	24	Milan Stojanović	10	0	10
2	MF	(Serbia)	88	Marko Stanojević	4	1	5
2	FW	(Kazakhstan)	9	Aidos Tattybayev	4	1	5
4	FW	(Kazakhstan)	10	Daurenbek Tazhimbetov	3	1	4
5	MF	(Slovakia)	27	Július Szöke	2	1	3
6	MF	(Kazakhstan)	22	Marat Shakhmetov	2	0	2
6	DF	(Kazakhstan)	4	Mikhail Gabyshev	2	0	2
6	MF	(Slovakia)	18	Štefan Zošák	2	0	2
9	FW	(Belgium)	99	Alessio Allegria	1	0	1
9	MF	(Kazakhstan)	21	Rinat Khairullin	1	0	1
9	FW	(Kazakhstan)	17	Oralkhan Omirtayev	1	0	1
9	FW	(Kazakhstan)	20	Sergei Khizhnichenko	1	0	1
9	DF	(Czech Republic)	15	Jakub Chleboun	1	0	1
9	DF	(England)	13	Korede Aiyegbusi	1	0	1
9	DF	(Kazakhstan)	34	Igor Pikalkin	1	0	1
9	DF	(Ivory Coast)	7	Didier Kadio	0	1	1
				TOTALS	36	5	41

=== Disciplinary record ===
Number	Nation	Position	Name	Premier League		Kazakhstan Cup		Total	
Number	Nation	Position	Name	Yellow card	Red card	Yellow card	Red card	Yellow card	Red card
1	(Kazakhstan)	GK	Yaroslav Baginskiy	1	0	0	0	1	0
4	(Kazakhstan)	DF	Mikhail Gabyshev	6	0	1	0	7	0
5	(Czech Republic)	MF	Jiří Valenta	1	0	0	0	1	0
6	(Kazakhstan)	DF	Ilnur Mangutkin	2	0	0	0	2	0
7	(Ivory Coast)	DF	Didier Kadio	1	1	0	0	1	1
7	(Kazakhstan)	MF	Gevorg Najaryan	1	1	0	0	1	1
8	(Kazakhstan)	DF	Viktor Dmitrenko	3	0	0	0	3	0
9	(Kazakhstan)	FW	Aidos Tattybayev	3	0	0	0	3	0
10	(Kazakhstan)	FW	Daurenbek Tazhimbetov	3	0	0	0	3	0
13	(England)	DF	Korede Aiyegbusi	3	0	1	0	4	0
15	(Czech Republic)	DF	Jakub Chleboun	3	1	0	0	3	1
19	(Kazakhstan)	DF	Yevgeny Tarasov	3	0	0	0	3	0
20	(Kazakhstan)	FW	Sergei Khizhnichenko	2	0	0	0	2	0
21	(Kazakhstan)	MF	Rinat Khairullin	0	0	1	0	1	0
22	(Kazakhstan)	MF	Marat Shakhmetov	3	0	1	0	4	0
24	(Serbia)	MF	Milan Stojanović	4	0	0	0	4	0
27	(Slovakia)	MF	Július Szöke	9	0	1	0	10	0
30	(Kazakhstan)	GK	Igor Shatskiy	2	0	0	0	2	0
34	(Kazakhstan)	DF	Igor Pikalkin	3	0	0	0	3	0
33	(Kazakhstan)	MF	Sergei Skorykh	2	0	1	0	3	0
44	(Kazakhstan)	MF	Kuanysh Ermekov	1	0	0	0	1	0
88	(Serbia)	MF	Marko Stanojević	6	0	0	0	6	0
99	(Belgium)	FW	Alessio Allegria	1	0	0	0	1	0
			TOTALS	62	2	6	0	68	2
