= 2019 FC Tobol season =

FC Tobol
2019 season
- Chairman: Nikolay Panin
- Manager: Vladimir Gazzayev (until 21 July); Nurbol Zhumaskaliyev Caretaker (from 22 July)
- Stadium: Central Stadium
- Kazakhstan Premier League: 4th
- Kazakhstan Cup: Semifinal vs Kaisar
- Europa League: First qualifying round vs Jeunesse Esch
- Top goalscorer: League: Azat Nurgaliev (10); All: Azat Nurgaliev (12)
Home colours	Away colours

The 2019 FC Tobol season was the 21st successive season that the club played in the Kazakhstan Premier League, the highest tier of association football in Kazakhstan. Tobol finished the season in 4th position, reached the Semifinals of the Kazakhstan Cup and were knocked out of the Europa League at the first qualifying round.

== Season events ==
On 31 December 2018, Vladimir Gazzayev was appointed as the club's new manager. Gazzayev resigned as manager on 21 July, after Tobol were eliminated from the 2019–20 UEFA Europa League by Jeunesse Esch. On 22 July, Nurbol Zhumaskaliyev was appointed as Caretaker manager of Tobol.

=== New Contracts ===
On 22 November 2018, Tobol signed new two-year contracts with Sultan Busurmanov, Sultan Abilgazy, Nika Kvekveskiri and Jaba Kankava.

On 14 December 2018, Azat Nurgaliev signed a new one-year contract with Tobol, with Samat Zharynbetov signing a new two-year contract on 27 December 2018.

On 13 January 2019, Grigori Sartakov signed a new two-year contract with Tobol, whilst Viktor Dmitrenko and Artūras Žulpa both signed new one-year contracts on 18 January 2019. Aleksandr Zhukov signed a new one-year contract with Tobol on 26 January.

== Squad ==
As of match played 10 November 2019

No.	Name	Nationality	Position	Date of birth (age)	Signed from	Signed in	Contract ends	Apps.	Goals
Goalkeepers
1	Sultan Busurmanov	(Kazakhstan)	GK	10 May 1996 (aged 23)	Academy	2015	2020	12	0
12	Emil Balayev	(Azerbaijan)	GK	17 April 1994 (aged 25)	Sabail	2019	2020	36	0
16	Zhasur Narzikulov	(Kazakhstan)	GK	13 April 1984 (aged 35)		2019	2020	1	0
Defenders
4	Fernander Kassaï	(Central African Republic)	DF	1 July 1987 (aged 32)	Slavia Sofia	2016		125	4
7	Dmitri Miroshnichenko	(Kazakhstan)	DF	26 February 1992 (aged 27)	Aktobe	2016		117	3
8	Viktor Dmitrenko	(Kazakhstan)	DF	4 April 1991 (aged 28)	Aktobe	2016	2019	99	1
19	Grigori Sartakov	(Kazakhstan)	DF	19 August 1994 (aged 25)	Irtysh Pavlodar	2017	2020	34	2
21	Sultan Abilgazy	(Kazakhstan)	DF	22 February 1997 (aged 22)	Okzhetpes	2018	2020	25	1
25	Vytautas Andriuškevičius	(Lithuania)	DF	8 October 1990 (aged 29)	Sūduva	2019		12	0
30	Roman Asrankulov	(Kazakhstan)	DF	30 July 1999 (aged 20)	Academy	2018		2	0
36	Daniyar Semchenkov	(Kazakhstan)	DF	12 February 1997 (aged 22)	Academy	2019		4	0
37	Aleksandr Zhukov	(Kazakhstan)	DF	4 November 1997 (aged 22)	Academy	2018	2019	3	0
Midfielders
10	Nika Kvekveskiri	(Georgia (country))	MF	29 May 1992 (aged 27)	Gabala	2017	2020	68	5
11	Ruslan Valiullin	(Kazakhstan)	MF	9 September 1994 (aged 25)	Aktobe	2019	2020	38	1
13	Azat Nurgaliev	(Kazakhstan)	MF	30 June 1986 (aged 33)	Ordabasy	2018	2019	219	42
14	Samat Zharynbetov	(Kazakhstan)	MF	4 January 1994 (aged 25)	Ekibastuz	2017	2020	52	2
20	Jaba Kankava	(Georgia (country))	MF	18 March 1986 (aged 33)		2018	2020	67	3
44	Artūras Žulpa	(Lithuania)	MF	10 June 1990 (aged 29)	Aktobe	2016	2019	120	7
46	Artem Sherstov	(Kazakhstan)	MF	16 October 1998 (aged 21)	Academy	2019		15	1
69	Nikita Bocharov	(Russia)	MF	12 June 1992 (aged 27)	Ordabasy	2019	2020	20	1
88	Roman Ukhanov	(Kazakhstan)	MF	12 March 1998 (aged 21)	Kyzylzhar	2019		0	0
96	Maxim Fedin	(Kazakhstan)	MF	8 June 1996 (aged 23)	Okzhetpes	2018		73	11
Forwards
15	Bauyrzhan Turysbek	(Kazakhstan)	FW	15 October 1991 (aged 28)	Kairat	2018		71	16
23	Senin Sebai	(Ivory Coast)	FW	18 December 1993 (aged 25)	Tambov	2019		29	8
Players away on loan
22	Andrey Pasechenko	(Kazakhstan)	GK	9 August 1987 (aged 32)	Atyrau	2019	2020	1	0
Left during the season
24	Aleksandr Kleshchenko	(Russia)	DF	2 November 1995 (aged 24)	Tom Tomsk	2019	2020	14	0
62	Mikhail Gordeichuk	(Belarus)	MF	23 October 1989 (aged 30)	BATE Borisov	2019	2020	20	3

=== On loan ===
Note: Flags indicate national team as defined under FIFA eligibility rules; some limited exceptions apply. Players may hold more than one non-FIFA nationality.

No. / Pos. / Nation / Player; 22 / GK / KAZ / Andrey Pasechenko (at Irtysh Pavlodar)	No. / Pos. / Nation / Player

== Transfers ==
=== In ===
Date	Position	Nationality	Name	From	Fee	Ref.
27 December 2018	GK	(Kazakhstan)	Andrey Pasechenko	Atyrau	Undisclosed	
27 December 2018	MF	(Belarus)	Mikhail Gordeichuk	BATE Borisov	Undisclosed	
27 December 2018	DF	(Kazakhstan)	Ruslan Valiullin	Aktobe	Undisclosed	
21 January 2019	MF	(Russia)	Nikita Bocharov	Ordabasy	Undisclosed	
30 January 2019	GK	(Azerbaijan)	Emil Balayev	Sabail	Undisclosed	
30 January 2019	DF	(Russia)	Aleksandr Kleshchenko	Tom Tomsk	Undisclosed	
	FW	(Ivory Coast)	Senin Sebai	Tambov	Undisclosed	
26 June 2019	GK	(Kazakhstan)	Zhasur Narzikulov		Free	
9 July 2019	DF	(Lithuania)	Vytautas Andriuškevičius	Sūduva	€20,000	
22 August 2019	MF	(Kazakhstan)	Roman Ukhanov	Kyzylzhar	Free	

=== Out ===
Date	Position	Nationality	Name	To	Fee	Ref.
28 December 2018	MF	(Kazakhstan)	Aslan Darabayev	Irtysh Pavlodar	Undisclosed	

=== Loans in ===
Date from	Position	Nationality	Name	From	Date to	Ref.
17 July 2018	FW	(Argentina)	Juan Lescano	Anzhi Makhachkala	15 January 2019	

=== Loans out ===
Date from	Position	Nationality	Name	To	Date to	Ref.
26 June 2019	GK	(Kazakhstan)	Andrey Pasechenko	Irtysh Pavlodar	End of Season	

=== Released ===
Date	Position	Nationality	Name	Joined	Date	Ref.
31 January 2019	DF	(Romania)	Ionuț Larie	Gaz Metan		
5 July 2019	DF	(Russia)	Aleksandr Kleshchenko	Yenisey Krasnoyarsk		
26 July 2019	MF	(Belarus)	Mikhail Gordeichuk	Dynamo Brest		
12 December 2019	GK	(Kazakhstan)	Zhasur Narzikulov	Aktobe		
15 December 2019	DF	(Central African Republic)	Fernander Kassaï	Gaz Metan		

=== Trial ===
Date From	Date To	Position	Nationality	Name	Last club	Ref.
3 February 2019		FW	(Ivory Coast)	Senin Sebai	Tambov	

== Friendlies ==
12 January 2019	Tobol (Kazakhstan)	1 – 1	(Hungary) Aqvital Csákvár	Antalya, Turkey
(UTC+6)	Nurgaliev	Report	Goal

16 January 2019	Tobol (Kazakhstan)	2 – 2	(Azerbaijan) Sabah	Antalya, Turkey
(UTC+6)	D.Zagvostkin; T.Amirgazy	Report	Eyyubov 39'; Imamverdiyev 53'

19 January 2019	Tobol (Kazakhstan)	0 – 1	(Hungary) Nyíregyháza Spartacus	Antalya, Turkey
(UTC+6)		Report	Goal

29 January 2019	Tobol (Kazakhstan)	2 – 1	(Tajikistan) Istiklol	Antalya, Turkey
19:00 (UTC+6)	Kankava; Fedin	Report	Fatkhuloev 15'

6 February 2019	Tobol (Kazakhstan)	1 – 2	(South Korea) Daejeon Citizen	Antalya, Turkey
(UTC+6)	Sebai 15'	Report	Goal

15 February 2019	Tobol (Kazakhstan)	0 – 4	(Ukraine) Olimpik Donetsk	Antalya, Turkey
(UTC+6)		Report	Goal

19 February 2019	Tobol (Kazakhstan)	1 – 0	(Russia) Rubin Kazan	Antalya, Turkey
(UTC+6)	Fedin	Report

24 February 2019	Tobol (Kazakhstan)	1 – 0	(Belarus) Gorodeya	Antalya, Turkey
(UTC+6)	Fedin	Report

== Competitions ==
=== Premier League ===
==== Results summary ====
Overall								Home						Away					
Pld	W	D	L	GF	GA	GD	Pts	W	D	L	GF	GA	GD	W	D	L	GF	GA	GD
33	19	6	8	45	27	+18	63	10	3	5	27	16	+11	9	3	3	18	11	+7

Last updated: 10 November 2019.
Source: See Results

==== Results by round ====
Round	1	2	3	4	5	6	7	8	9	10	11	12	13	14	15	16	17	18	19	20	21	22	23	24	25	26	27	28	29	30	31	32	33
Ground	H	H	A	H	A	H	A	H	A	A	H	A	H	A	H	H	H	A	H	H	A	H	A	H	A	H	A	H	H	A	A	H	H
Result	W	W	W	W	W	D	L	D	W	L	W	W	W	W	W	W	L	D	L	L	W	W	D	W	W	W	W	D	L	L	D	L	W
Position/	4	1	1	2	2	2	2	2	2	2	3	2	2	2	2	1	2	1	1	2	1	1	1	1	1	1	1	2	3	4	3	4	4

Source: See Results
A = Away; H = Home; W = Win; D = Draw; L = Loss

==== Results ====
9 March 2019 1	Tobol	3 – 0	Irtysh Pavlodar	Kostanay
17:00 (UTC+6)	Nurgaliev 17', 35'; Turysbek 80'	Report	Paragulgov (yellow card) 58'	Stadium: Central Stadium; Attendance: 3,000; Referee: Alexsandr Gauzer

15 March 2019 2	Tobol	4 – 1	Taraz	Kostanay
17:00 (UTC+6)	Kankava (yellow card) 6'; Nurgaliev 31' (pen.); Gordeichuk 62', 75'; Kassaï (yellow card) 78'; Turysbek 88'	Report	Elivelto (yellow card) 4'; B.Shadmanov (yellow card) 23'; R.Rozybakiev (yellow card) 34'; Lobjanidze 83' (pen.)	Stadium: Central Stadium; Attendance: 3,200; Referee: Grigory Moskovchenko

31 March 2019 3	Shakhter Karagandy	0 – 1	Tobol	Astana
15:00 (UTC+6)	Najaryan (yellow card) 51'	Report	Kankava (yellow card) 4'; Žulpa (yellow card) 80'; Kleshchenko (yellow card) 84'; Sebai 88'	Stadium: Astana Arena; Attendance: 1,000; Referee: Denis Tevyashov

6 April 2019 4	Tobol	2 – 1	Aktobe	Kostanay
15:00 (UTC+6)	Miroshnichenko (yellow card) 31'; Nurgaliev 34' (pen.); Sebai (yellow card) 58'; Fedin 81'	Report	A.Tanzharikov (yellow card) 13'; Radin (yellow card) 19'; B.Kairov (yellow card) 65'; E.Zhasanov 89'	Stadium: Central Stadium; Attendance: 3,000; Referee: Artyom Kuchin

14 April 2019 5	Okzhetpes	1 – 2	Tobol	Kokshetau
15:00 (UTC+6)	Moldakaraev (yellow card) 51'; Kasmynin (yellow card) 65'; S.Zhumakhanov (yellow card) 71'; Nusserbayev 90'	Report	Kvekveskiri 42'; Fedin 56'; Miroshnichenko (yellow card) 70'; Žulpa (red card) 71'; Balayev (yellow card) 90+1'	Stadium: Okzhetpes Stadium; Attendance: 3,000; Referee: Igor Chesnokov

20 April 2019 6	Tobol	0 – 0	Zhetysu	Kostanay
17:00 (UTC+6)		Report	Dimitrov (yellow card) 51'	Stadium: Central Stadium; Attendance: 3,000; Referee: Bakhyt Kyzylbaev

27 April 2019 7	Astana	2 – 1	Tobol	Astana
19:00 (UTC+6)	Muzhikov (yellow card) 37'; Aničić 59'; Mayewski (yellow card) 73'; Murtazayev 90+2'	Report	Bocharov 8'; Kvekveskiri (yellow card) 33'; Kassaï (yellow card) 51'; Balayev (yellow card) 90'; Kleshchenko (yellow card) 90+3'	Stadium: Astana Arena; Attendance: 3,000; Referee: Sergey Gorokhovodatskiy

1 May 2019 8	Tobol	1 – 1	Ordabasy	Kostanay
17:00 (UTC+6)	Gordeichuk (yellow card) 53'; Žulpa (yellow card) 65'; Nurgaliev 78'; Balayev (yellow card) 90+1'	Report	Nepohodov (yellow card) 36'; M.Tolebek (yellow card) 66'; Fontanello (yellow card) 68'; Zhangylyshbay 90+4' (yellow card) 90+4'	Stadium: Central Stadium; Attendance: 3,000; Referee: Askhat Abdanbayev

5 May 2019 9	Kairat	0 – 1	Tobol	Almaty
18:00 (UTC+6)	Kuat (yellow card) 65'; Shvyrev (yellow card) 90+1'	Report	Bocharov (yellow card) 49'; Fedin (yellow card) 64'; Žulpa (yellow card) 69'; Turysbek 87'	Stadium: Central Stadium; Attendance: 5,000; Referee: Grigory Moskovchenko

12 May 2019 10	Kaisar	5 – 1	Tobol	Kyzylorda
18:00 (UTC+6)	Barseghyan 9', 85'; Mbombo 39'; Tagybergen 43'; I.Amirseitov (yellow card) 73'; S.Abzalov 90+4'	Report	Kleshchenko (yellow card) 45+2'; Kvekveskiri 47'; Turysbek (yellow card) 75'	Stadium: Gani Muratbayev Stadium; Attendance: 3,500; Referee: Bagdat Abdullaev

18 May 2019 11	Tobol	3 – 0	Atyrau	Kostanay
17:00 (UTC+6)	Fedin 44'; Žulpa 53'; Nurgaliev (yellow card) 59'; Kankava (yellow card) 66'; Dmitrenko (yellow card) 74'; S.Zharynbetov (yellow card) 75'; Valiullin 90+3'	Report	A.Shabaev (yellow card) 74'; D.Mazhitov (yellow card) 75'; R.Ospanov (yellow card) 90+1'	Stadium: Central Stadium; Attendance: 3,000; Referee: Bolat Karlibayev

26 May 2019 12	Taraz	0 – 1	Tobol	Taraz
16:00 (UTC+6)	A.Taubay (yellow card) 15'; B.Aitbayev (yellow card) 17'; I.Pikalkin (yellow card) 52'	Report	Nurgaliev (yellow card) 51'; Kankava (yellow card) 57'; A.Sherstov 80'	Stadium: Central Stadium; Attendance: 4,500; Referee: Sergey Gorokhovodatskiy

31 May 2019 13	Tobol	2 – 0	Shakhter Karagandy	Kostanay
19:00 (UTC+6)	Turysbek 25'; Nurgaliev (yellow card) 46' (goal) 60'	Report	Shakhmetov (yellow card) 90+1'	Stadium: Central Stadium; Attendance: 3,000; Referee: Daniyar Sakhi

15 June 2019 14	Aktobe	0 – 1	Tobol	Aktobe
20:00 (UTC+6)	Radin (yellow card) 40'	Report	Turysbek 75'	Stadium: Central Stadium; Attendance: 7,000; Referee: Saken Bayimbet

23 June 2019 15	Tobol	2 – 0	Okzhetpes	Kostanay
19:00 (UTC+6)	S.Zharynbetov (yellow card) 5'; Sebai 58'; Nurgaliev 69'	Report	A.Ersalimov (yellow card) 3'; Nusserbayev (yellow card) 35'; Kislitsyn (yellow card) 82'; I.Kalinin (yellow card) 90+3'	Stadium: Central Stadium; Attendance: 4,500; Referee: Furkat Atajanov

30 June 2019 16	Zhetysu	0 – 1	Tobol	Taldıqorğan
18:00 (UTC+6)	Zhaksylykov (yellow card) 48'; Stepanyuk (yellow card) 72'	Report	Kassaï 32' (yellow card) 45'; Sebai (yellow card) 78'	Stadium: Zhetysu Stadium; Attendance: 3,000; Referee: Bolat Saryev

5 July 2019 17	Tobol	0 – 2	Astana	Kostanay
19:00 (UTC+6)	Turysbek (yellow card) 35'; Žulpa (yellow card) 74'	Report	Mayewski (yellow card) 43'; Sigurjónsson 53'; Tomasov 76'; Janga (yellow card) 90'	Stadium: Central Stadium; Attendance: 5,500; Referee: Askhat Abdanbayev

14 July 2019 18	Ordabasy	0 – 0	Tobol	Shymkent
20:00 (UTC+6)	Bystrov (yellow card) 37'; Erlanov (yellow card) 63'	Report	S.Zharynbetov (yellow card) 77'; Dmitrenko (yellow card) 87'	Stadium: Kazhymukan Munaitpasov Stadium; Attendance: 5,500; Referee: Denis Izmailov

21 July 2019 19	Tobol	3 – 5	Kairat	Kostanay
18:00 (UTC+6)	Žulpa 14'; Kvekveskiri (yellow card) 24'; Fedin 31'; Kankava (yellow card) 40'; Valiullin (yellow card) 69'; Sebai 83'; Andriuškevičius (red card) 85'	Report	R.Orazov (yellow card) 30'; Seydakhmet 45+1'; Eppel 73', 79'; Eseola 82'; Islamkhan 87' (pen.)	Stadium: Central Stadium; Attendance: 4,000; Referee: Artyom Kuchin

28 July 2019 20	Tobol	0 – 2	Kaisar	Kostanay
19:00 (UTC+6)	Nurgaliev (yellow card) 26'; Dmitrenko (yellow card) 69' (yellow-red card) 90+4'; Abilgazy (yellow card) 87'	Report	Mbombo 9', 21'; Narzildaev (yellow card) 66'; Grigorenko (yellow card) 90+2'	Stadium: Central Stadium; Attendance: 5,500; Referee: Igor Chesnokov

2 August 2019 21	Atyrau	0 – 1	Tobol	Atyrau
20:00 (UTC+6)	Ablitarov (yellow card) 46'; D.Mazhitov (yellow card) 82'; Sergienko (yellow card) 90'	Report	Sebai 38' (yellow card) 66'; Kankava (yellow card) 54'; Turysbek (yellow card) 62'	Stadium: Munaishy Stadium; Attendance: 4,500; Referee: Timur Kumashev

11 August 2019 22	Irtysh Pavlodar	0 – 2	Tobol	Pavlodar
19:30 (UTC+6)	Stanojević (yellow card) 64'; Hidi (yellow card) 73'; R.Yesimov (yellow card) 80'; Fonseca (yellow card) 82'	Report	Turysbek 60'; Fedin 74' (pen.)	Stadium: Central Stadium; Attendance: 3,000; Referee: Saken Bayimbet

17 August 2019 23	Irtysh Pavlodar	0 – 0	Tobol	Pavlodar
18:00 (UTC+6)	Manzorro (yellow card) 41'; Mingazow (yellow card) 74'; Stanojević (yellow card) 83'; Stamenković (yellow card) 90+4'	Report	Valiullin (yellow card) 47'; Kankava (yellow card) 88'; Dmitrenko (yellow card) 90+4'	Stadium: Central Stadium; Attendance: 2,500; Referee: Askhhat Abdanbayev

24 August 2019 24	Tobol	2 – 0	Atyrau	Kostanay
19:00 (UTC+6)	Abilgazy 32' (yellow card) 60'; Kankava (yellow card) 40'; Miroshnichenko 71'	Report	Ngwem (yellow card) 22'; R.Ospanov (yellow card) 25'; Ustinov (yellow card) 65'; M.Gabyshev (yellow card) 80'	Stadium: Central Stadium; Attendance: 4,500; Referee: Sergey Nozhenko

31 August 2019 25	Taraz	0 – 5	Tobol	Taraz
18:00 (UTC+6)	Kasradze (yellow card) 2'; Subotić (yellow card) 41'; M.Amirkhanov (yellow card) 56'	Report	Nurgaliev 3' (pen.) (yellow card) 64'; Turysbek 12' (yellow card) 38'; Sebai 21', 76'; Miroshnichenko 90'	Stadium: Central Stadium; Attendance: 4,000; Referee: Furkat Atajanov

15 September 2019 26	Tobol	1 – 0	Okzhetpes	Kostanay
18:00 (UTC+6)	Fedin (yellow card) 12'; Abilgazy (yellow card) 45+2'; Sebai 87' (yellow card) 90+2'	Report	A.Ersalimov (yellow card) 90+4'; N.Dairov (yellow card) 29'; Dimov (yellow card) 53'; Alves (yellow card) 90+4'	Stadium: Central Stadium; Attendance: 4,000; Referee: Bagdat Abdullaev

22 September 2019 27	Shakhter Karagandy	0 – 1	Tobol	Karaganda
16:00 (UTC+6)	Shakhmetov (red card) 62'	Report	Miroshnichenko (yellow card) 39'; Kankava (yellow card) 62'; Abilgazy (yellow card) 70'; Kassaï 89'; A.Sherstov (yellow card) 90'	Stadium: Shakhter Stadium; Attendance: 3,000; Referee: Timur Kumashev

28 September 2019 28	Tobol	0 – 0	Zhetysu	Kostanay
17:00 (UTC+6)	Andriuškevičius (yellow card) 86'	Report	Y.Tapalov (yellow card) 51'; Lebedzew (yellow card) 65'; Bekbaev (yellow card) 90+5'	Stadium: Central Stadium; Attendance: 4,000; Referee: Denis Tevyashov

20 October 2019 30	Tobol	1 – 2	Ordabasy	Kostanay
14:00 (UTC+6)	Valiullin (yellow card) 13'; Nurgaliev 31'; Abilgazy (yellow card) 54'; Dmitrenko (yellow card) 60'	Report	João Paulo 37'; Badibanga 51'; Dosmagambetov (yellow card) 76'; Nepohodov (yellow card) 90'	Stadium: Central Stadium; Attendance: 2,700; Referee: Igor Chesnokov

26 October 2019 31	Kairat	2 – 0	Tobol	Almaty
17:00 (UTC+6)	Seydakhmet (yellow card) 43'; Zhukov 73'; Alip (yellow card) 79'; Abiken (yellow card) 89'; A.Shushenachev 90+3'	Report	Sebai (yellow card) 63'	Stadium: Central Stadium; Attendance: 12,000; Referee: Denis Izmailov

30 October 2019 29	Kaisar	1 – 1	Tobol	Kyzylorda
16:00 (UTC+6)	Tagybergen 40' (yellow card) 70'; M.Islamkulov (yellow card) 75'; O.Makhan (yellow card) 77'; John (yellow card) 79'; V.Chureyev (yellow card) 90+2'	Report	Andriuškevičius (yellow card) 16'; Nurgaliev 90+3'	Stadium: Gani Muratbayev Stadium; Attendance: 3,000; Referee: Timur Kumashev
Note: Match originally scheduled for 4 October 2019 but postponed due to Kaisar's involvement in 2019 Kazakhstan Cup Final on 6 October 2019.

3 November 2019 32	Tobol	0 – 1	Astana	Kostanay
15:00 (UTC+6)	Nurgaliev (yellow card) 35'; Sebai (yellow card) 56'	Report	Logvinenko 37'	Stadium: Tobol Indoor Arena; Attendance: 2,700; Referee: Askhat Abdanbayev

10 November 2019 33	Tobol	2 – 1	Aktobe	Kostanay
15:00 (UTC+6)	Sebai 30' (yellow card) 62'; Turysbek 58'; S.Zharynbetov (yellow card) 73'; Dmitrenko (yellow card) 83'	Report	A.Saulet 39' (yellow card) 60'; A.Shurigin (yellow card) 43'; Volkov (yellow card) 52'; E.Zhasanov (yellow card) 83'	Stadium: Tobol Indoor Arena; Attendance: 2,000; Referee: Aydin Rakhimbayev

==== League table ====
Pos	Team	Pld	W	D	L	GF	GA	GD	Pts	Qualification or relegation
2	Kairat	33	22	2	9	65	32	+33	68	Qualification for the Europa League first qualifying round
3	Ordabasy	33	19	8	6	52	24	+28	65	Qualification for the Europa League first qualifying round
4	Tobol	33	19	6	8	45	27	+18	63	
5	Zhetysu	33	16	8	9	45	25	+20	56	
6	Kaisar	33	12	6	15	37	43	−6	42	Qualification for the Europa League second qualifying round (Note: Kaisar qualified for the Europa League second qualifying round by winning the 2019 Kazakhstan Cup.)

Source: UEFA, Soccerway
Rules for classification: 1) Points; 2) Goal difference; 3) Matches won; 4) Goals scored; 5) Away goals scored; 6) Head-to-head points; 7) Head-to-head matches won; 8) Head-to-head goal difference; 9) Head-to-head goals scored; 10) Head-to-head away goals scored; 11) Draw.

=== Kazakhstan Cup ===
10 April 2019 Last 16	Aksu	0 – 3	Tobol	Pavlodar
17:00 (UTC+6)	Chernyshov (yellow card) 23'; M.Matvienko (yellow card) 55'; T.Baysufinov (red card) 90'	Report	Turysbek 47', 66'; Nurgaliev 68'	Stadium: Central Stadium; Attendance: 1,800; Referee: Ruslan Omarov

8 May 2019 Quarterfinal	Kairat	1 – 5	Tobol	Almaty
19:00 (UTC+6)	Shvyrev (yellow card) 32'; Suyumbayev (yellow card) 45+5'; Sarsenov (yellow card) 64' (goal) 90+1'	Report	Turysbek 13'; Fedin 25'; Dmitrenko (yellow card) 36'; Gordeichuk 44'; Kuat 59' (o.g.); Nurgaliev 86'	Stadium: Central Stadium; Attendance: 2,000; Referee: Artem Kuchin

22 May 2019 Semifinal 1st leg	Tobol	1 – 0	Kaisar	Kostanay
19:00 (UTC+6)	Kankava (yellow card) 3'; Bocharov (yellow card) 29'; Fedin 73'; Kleshchenko (yellow card) 83'; Nurgaliev (yellow card) 90+1'	Report	Graf (yellow card) 17'; Tagybergen (yellow card) 88'	Stadium: Central Stadium; Attendance: 3,000; Referee: Igor Chesnokov

19 June 2019 Semifinal 2nd leg	Kaisar	3 – 1 (3 – 2 agg.)	Tobol	Kyzylorda
18:00 (UTC+6)	Barseghyan 15', 90+6' (pen.); Narzildaev (yellow card) 47'; Mbombo 66'	Report	Kassaï (yellow card) 51'; Žulpa 88'; Valiullin (yellow card) 90+3'	Stadium: Gani Muratbayev Stadium; Attendance: 3,000; Referee: Artem Kuchin

=== UEFA Europa League ===
==== Qualifying rounds ====
10 July 2019 First qualifying round 1st leg	Jeunesse Esch (Luxembourg)	0 – 0	(Kazakhstan) Tobol	Esch-sur-Alzette, Luxembourg
21:55 (UTC+6)		Report	Valiullin (yellow card) 29'; Nurgaliev (yellow card) 40'; Sebai (yellow card) 52'; Žulpa (yellow card) 64'	Stadium: Stade de la Frontière; Attendance: 1,384; Referee: Eldorjan Hamiti (Albania)

18 July 2019 First qualifying round 2nd leg	Tobol (Kazakhstan)	1 – 1 (1 – 1 (a) agg.)	(Luxembourg) Jeunesse Esch	Nur-Sultan, Kazakhstan
18:00 (UTC+6)	Menai 22' (o.g.); Nurgaliev (yellow card) 29'; Turysbek (yellow card) 66'	Report	Arslan 59' (pen.) (yellow card) 71'; Moreira (yellow card) 85'; A.Fiorani (yellow card) 90'	Stadium: Astana Arena; Attendance: 2,500; Referee: Emmanouil Skoulas (Greece)
Note: Tobol played their home match at the Astana Arena, Nur-Sultan, instead of their regular stadium Central Stadium, Kostanay.

== Squad statistics ==
As of match played 10 November 2019

=== Appearances and goals ===
No.	Pos	Nat	Player	Total		Premier League		Kazakhstan Cup		Europa League	
No.	Pos	Nat	Player	Apps	Goals	Apps	Goals	Apps	Goals	Apps	Goals
1	GK	(Kazakhstan) KAZ	Sultan Busurmanov	3	0	1	0	1+1	0	0	0
4	DF	(Central African Republic) CAF	Fernander Kassaï	33	2	27+1	2	3	0	2	0
7	DF	(Kazakhstan) KAZ	Dmitri Miroshnichenko	26	2	22+2	2	1	0	1	0
8	DF	(Kazakhstan) KAZ	Viktor Dmitrenko	37	0	25+6	0	4	0	2	0
10	MF	(Georgia (country)) GEO	Nika Kvekveskiri	26	2	18+4	2	2	0	2	0
11	MF	(Kazakhstan) KAZ	Ruslan Valiullin	38	1	32	1	3+1	0	1+1	0
12	GK	(Azerbaijan) AZE	Emil Balayev	36	0	31	0	3	0	2	0
13	MF	(Kazakhstan) KAZ	Azat Nurgaliev	37	12	30+2	10	2+1	2	2	0
14	MF	(Kazakhstan) KAZ	Samat Zharynbetov	18	0	2+13	0	2+1	0	0	0
15	FW	(Kazakhstan) KAZ	Bauyrzhan Turysbek	35	11	15+15	8	3	3	1+1	0
16	GK	(Kazakhstan) KAZ	Zhasur Narzikulov	1	0	1	0	0	0	0	0
20	MF	(Georgia (country)) GEO	Jaba Kankava	33	0	28+1	0	2	0	2	0
21	DF	(Kazakhstan) KAZ	Sultan Abilgazy	17	1	10+5	1	1+1	0	0	0
23	FW	(Ivory Coast) CIV	Senin Sebai	29	8	14+12	8	1	0	2	0
25	DF	(Lithuania) LTU	Vytautas Andriuškevičius	11	0	11	0	0	0	0	0
30	DF	(Kazakhstan) KAZ	Roman Asrankulov	1	0	0	0	1	0	0	0
36	DF	(Kazakhstan) KAZ	Daniyar Semchenkov	4	0	0+3	0	1	0	0	0
37	DF	(Kazakhstan) KAZ	Aleksandr Zhukov	1	0	0	0	0+1	0	0	0
44	MF	(Lithuania) LTU	Artūras Žulpa	35	3	30	2	3	1	2	0
46	MF	(Kazakhstan) KAZ	Artem Sherstov	15	1	0+13	1	0+2	0	0	0
69	MF	(Russia) RUS	Nikita Bocharov	20	1	12+3	1	2+1	0	2	0
96	MF	(Kazakhstan) KAZ	Maxim Fedin	39	7	32+1	5	4	2	0+2	0
Players away from Tobol on loan:
22	GK	(Kazakhstan) KAZ	Andrey Pasechenko	1	0	0+1	0	0	0	0	0
Players who left Tobol during the season:
24	DF	(Russia) RUS	Aleksandr Kleshchenko	14	0	12	0	2	0	0	0
62	MF	(Belarus) BLR	Mikhail Gordeichuk	20	3	10+4	2	3+1	1	1+1	0

=== Goal scorers ===
Place	Position	Nation	Number	Name	Premier League	Kazakhstan Cup	Europa League	Total
1	MF	(Kazakhstan)	13	Azat Nurgaliev	10	2	0	12
2	FW	(Kazakhstan)	15	Bauyrzhan Turysbek	8	3	0	11
3	FW	(Ivory Coast)	23	Senin Sebai	8	0	0	8
4	MF	(Kazakhstan)	96	Maxim Fedin	5	2	0	7
5	MF	(Belarus)	62	Mikhail Gordeichuk	2	1	0	3
5	MF	(Lithuania)	44	Artūras Žulpa	2	1	0	3
7	MF	(Georgia (country))	10	Nika Kvekveskiri	2	0	0	2
7	DF	(Kazakhstan)	7	Dmitri Miroshnichenko	2	0	0	2
7	DF	(Central African Republic)	4	Fernander Kassaï	2	0	0	2
7				Own goal	0	1	1	2
11	MF	(Russia)	69	Nikita Bocharov	1	0	0	1
11	MF	(Kazakhstan)	11	Ruslan Valiullin	1	0	0	1
11	MF	(Kazakhstan)	46	Artem Sherstov	1	0	0	1
11	DF	(Kazakhstan)	21	Sultan Abilgazy	1	0	0	1
				TOTALS	45	10	1	56

=== Disciplinary record ===
Number	Nation	Position	Name	Premier League		Kazakhstan Cup		Europa League		Total	
Number	Nation	Position	Name	Yellow card	Red card	Yellow card	Red card	Yellow card	Red card	Yellow card	Red card
4	(Central African Republic)	DF	Fernander Kassaï	3	0	1	0	0	0	4	0
7	(Kazakhstan)	DF	Dmitri Miroshnichenko	3	0	0	0	0	0	3	0
8	(Kazakhstan)	DF	Viktor Dmitrenko	7	1	1	0	0	0	8	1
10	(Georgia (country))	MF	Nika Kvekveskiri	2	0	0	0	0	0	2	0
11	(Kazakhstan)	MF	Ruslan Valiullin	3	0	1	0	1	0	5	0
12	(Azerbaijan)	GK	Emil Balayev	3	0	0	0	0	0	3	0
13	(Kazakhstan)	MF	Azat Nurgaliev	6	0	1	0	2	0	9	0
14	(Kazakhstan)	MF	Samat Zharynbetov	5	0	0	0	0	0	5	0
15	(Kazakhstan)	FW	Bauyrzhan Turysbek	4	0	0	0	1	0	5	0
20	(Georgia (country))	MF	Jaba Kankava	9	0	1	0	0	0	10	0
21	(Kazakhstan)	DF	Sultan Abilgazy	4	0	0	0	0	0	4	0
23	(Ivory Coast)	FW	Senin Sebai	7	0	0	0	1	0	8	0
25	(Lithuania)	DF	Vytautas Andriuškevičius	2	1	0	0	0	0	2	1
44	(Lithuania)	MF	Artūras Žulpa	4	1	0	0	1	0	5	1
46	(Russia)	MF	Artem Sherstov	1	0	0	0	0	0	1	0
69	(Russia)	MF	Nikita Bocharov	1	0	1	0	0	0	2	0
96	(Kazakhstan)	MF	Maxim Fedin	2	0	0	0	0	0	2	0
Players who left Tobol during the season:
24	(Russia)	DF	Aleksandr Kleshchenko	3	0	1	0	0	0	4	0
62	(Belarus)	MF	Mikhail Gordeichuk	1	0	0	0	0	0	1	0
			TOTALS	70	3	8	0	6	0	84	3
