= Aiyegbusi =

Aiyegbusi is a surname. Notable people with the surname include:

- Dabba-Kato (birth name Babatunde Aiyegbusi, born 1988), Polish wrestler
- Korede Aiyegbusi (born 1988), English footballer
