= Sultan Abilgazy =

Kazakhstani footballer

Personal information
- Full name: Sultan Suyindikuly Abilgazy
- Date of birth: 22 February 1997 (age 29)
- Place of birth: Kokshetau, Kazakhstan
- Height: 1.80 m (5 ft 11 in)
- Position: Centre-back

Team information
- Current team: Yelimay
- Number: 21

Senior career*
Years	Team	Apps	(Gls)
2014–2017	Okzhetpes	10	(0)
2016–2017	Okzhetpes U21	34	(6)
2018–2019	Tobol U21	9	(0)
2018–2022	Tobol	42	(2)
2022	Turan	4	(0)
2023–	Yelimay	17	(2)

International career^{‡}
2013	Kazakhstan U17	3	(0)
2017–2018	Kazakhstan U21	6	(0)
- * Club domestic league appearances and goals as of 6 April 2024 ‡ National team caps and goals as of 17:14, 14 October 2020 (UTC)

Sultan Suyindikuly Abilgazy (Kazakh: Сұлтан Сүйіндікұлы Әбілғазы, Sūltan Süiındıkūly Äbılğazy; born 22 February 1997) is a Kazakhstani footballer who plays as a centre-back for Yelimay.

== Career ==
Abilgazy made his professional debut in the Kazakhstan Premier League for Okzhetpes on 2 October 2016, coming on as a substitute in the 76th minute for Zhakyp Kozhamberdi against Astana, with the away match finishing as a 0–3 loss.
