= Viktor Dmitrenko =

Kazakh football defender

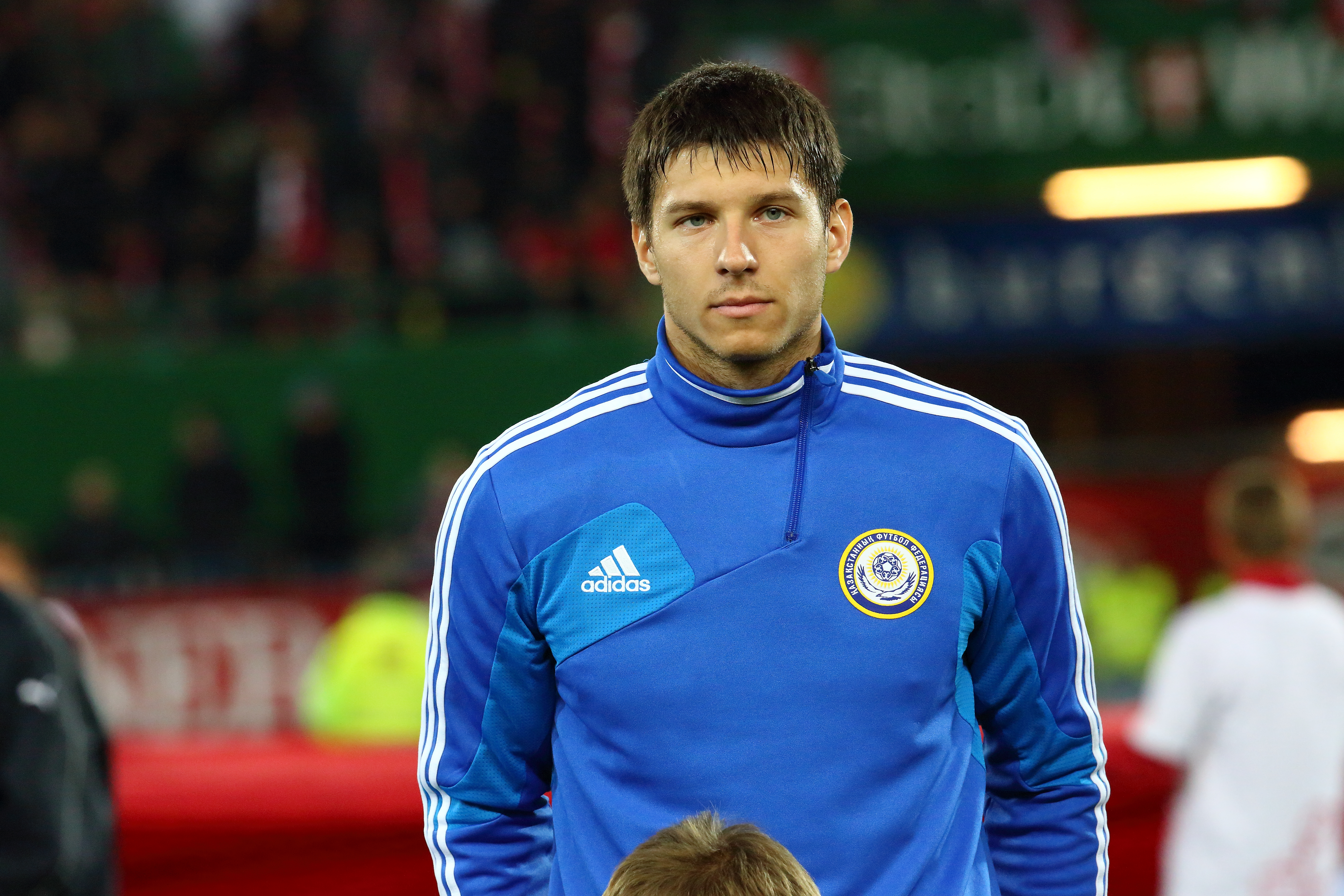

Personal information
- Full name: Viktor Nikolayevich Dmitrenko
- Date of birth: 4 April 1991 (age 35)
- Place of birth: Primorsko-Akhtarsk, Krasnodar Krai, Russian SFSR, Soviet Union
- Height: 1.90 m (6 ft 3 in)
- Position: Centre-back

Team information
- Current team: Caspiy
- Number: 8

Youth career
- 2002–2005: Azovets
- 2005–2007: Kuban Krasnodar

Senior career*
Years	Team	Apps	(Gls)
2007–2011	Kuban Krasnodar	3	(0)
2010	→ Zimbru Chişinău (loan)	10	(0)
2011	→ Torpedo Armavir (loan)	14	(0)
2012–2014	Astana	75	(4)
2015	Aktobe	16	(2)
2016–2020	Tobol	89	(1)
2017	→ Shakhter Karagandy (loan)	15	(0)
2020–2021	Ordabasy	12	(1)
2021–2022	Atyrau	14	(1)
2022–2023	Caspiy	14	(0)
2023–2024	Shakhter Karagandy	16	(0)
2024—	Caspiy	6	(0)

International career^{‡}
2012	Kazakhstan U21	2	(0)
2012–	Kazakhstan	19	(1)
- * Club domestic league appearances and goals as of 12 July 2024 ‡ National team caps and goals as of 10:47, 22 November 2017 (UTC)

Viktor Nikolayevich Dmitrenko (Russian: Виктор Николаевич Дмитренко; born 4 April 1991) is a professional footballer who plays as a defender for Caspiy. Although primarily playing as a centre-back, he plays occasionally as a right-back or left-back. Born in Russia, he plays for the Kazakhstan national team.

== Club career ==
He also played for FC Zimbru Chișinău for a short period of time as a loan from FC Kuban Krasnodar and left the club because of his university studies in Russia. He made his professional debut in the Russian First Division in 2008 for FC Kuban Krasnodar.

In January 2016, Dmitrenko signed for FC Tobol.

== Career statistics ==
=== Club ===
As of match played 10 November 2019

Appearances and goals by club, season and competition
Club	Season	League			National Cup		Continental		Other		Total	
Club	Season	Division	Apps	Goals	Apps	Goals	Apps	Goals	Apps	Goals	Apps	Goals
Kuban Krasnodar	2008	FNL	2	0	0	0	-		-		2	0
Kuban Krasnodar	2009	RPL	1	0			-		-		1	0
Kuban Krasnodar	2010	FNL	0	0			-		-		0	0
Kuban Krasnodar	2011–12	RPL	0	0	0	0	-		-		0	0
Kuban Krasnodar	Total		3	0	0	0	-	-	-	-	3	0
Zimbru Chișinău (loan)	2010–11	Moldovan National Division	10	0			-		-		10	0
Torpedo Armavir (loan)	2011–12	RPFL	14	0	3	0	-		-		17	0
Astana	2012	Kazakhstan Premier League	18	2	6	0	-		-		24	2
Astana	2013	Kazakhstan Premier League	31	1	2	0	2	0	1	0	36	1
Astana	2014	Kazakhstan Premier League	26	1	4	0	6	0	-		36	1
Astana	Total		75	4	12	0	8	0	1	0	96	4
Aktobe	2015	Kazakhstan Premier League	16	2	3	1	1	0	-		20	3
Tobol	2016	Kazakhstan Premier League	18	0	0	0	-		-		18	0
Tobol	2017	Kazakhstan Premier League	11	0	0	0	-		-		11	0
Tobol	2018	Kazakhstan Premier League	29	1	2	0	4	0	-		35	1
Tobol	2019	Kazakhstan Premier League	31	0	4	0	2	0	-		37	0
Tobol	Total		89	1	6	0	6	0	-	-	101	1
Shakhter Karagandy (loan)	2017	Kazakhstan Premier League	15	0	0	0	-		-		15	0
Career total			222	7	24	1	15	0	1	0	262	8

=== International ===
Kazakhstan
Year	Apps	Goals
2012	3	0
2013	8	0
2014	3	0
Total	14	1

Statistics accurate as of match played 10 October 2014

=== International goals ===
Scores and results list Kazakhstan's goal tally first.

Goal	Date	Venue	Opponent	Score	Result	Competition
1.	26 February 2013	Mardan Sports Complex, Aksu, Turkey	Moldova	1–0	3–1	Friendly

== Honours ==
=== Club ===
Astana

- Kazakhstan Premier League (1): 2014
- Kazakhstan Cup (1): 2012
