= Marko Stanojević =

Serbian footballer

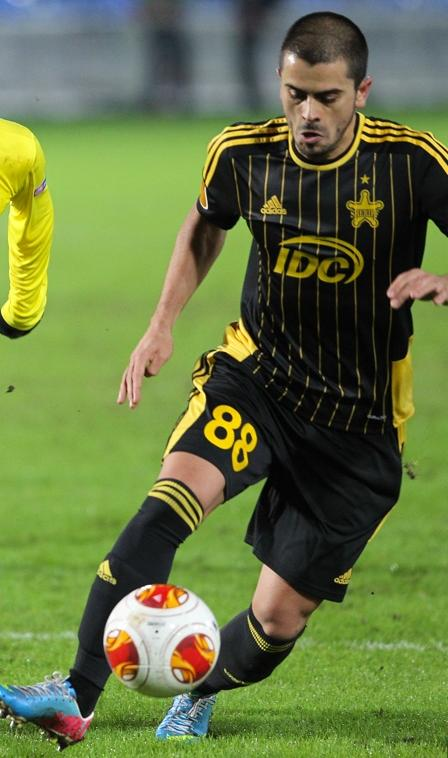
- Stanojević with Sheriff Tiraspol in 2013

Personal information
- Full name: Marko Stanojević
- Date of birth: 22 June 1988 (age 38)
- Place of birth: Pirot, SFR Yugoslavia
- Height: 1.80 m (5 ft 11 in)
- Position: Midfielder

Team information
- Current team: Dinamo Samarqand
- Number: 26

Youth career
- Red Star Belgrade

Senior career*
Years	Team	Apps	(Gls)
2006–2007	→ Sopot (loan)	30	(2)
2007–2008	Sopot	24	(2)
2008–2009	Laktaši	32	(1)
2010–2012	Rad	66	(9)
2012–2014	Sheriff Tiraspol	52	(4)
2014–2015	→ Simurq (loan)	17	(4)
2015	Al Fateh	2	(0)
2016–2017	Rad	30	(1)
2017–2018	Shakhter Karagandy	29	(4)
2018	Astana	9	(0)
2018–2019	Levadiakos	21	(2)
2019	Irtysh Pavlodar	14	(2)
2020–2024	Nasaf	111	(15)
2025	Dinamo Samarqand	29	(2)
2026	Ušće Novi Beograd	7	(4)
2026–	Dinamo Samarqand	2	(0)

International career^{‡}
2009–2010	Serbia U21	3	(0)
- * Club domestic league appearances and goals as of 28 July 2026 ‡ National team caps and goals as of 1 June 2010

Marko Stanojević (Serbian Cyrillic: Марко Станојевић; born 22 June 1988) is a Serbian footballer who plays as a midfielder for Dinamo Samarqand in the Uzbekistan Super League.

== Career ==
Stanojević has played for Red Star in Serbia, and FK Laktaši in the Premier League of Bosnia and Herzegovina. During the 2011–12 UEFA Europa League qualifying phase and play-off round, Stanojević scored a brace in the first leg against San Marino team Tre Penne in which FK Rad won 6–0. He scored his third goal of the competition, in the second leg, in which Rad won 3–1, taking their aggregate score to 9–1.

On 8 August 2014, Stanojević signed on a one-year loan deal with Simurq.

On 25 December 2017, FC Astana announced the signing of Stanojević. On 23 July 2018, Astana announced that Stanojević had left the club. On 1 September 2018, Levadiakos announced the signing of the Serbian winger till the summer of 2020 for an undisclosed fee.

On 9 July 2019, Stanojević returned to the Kazakhstan Premier League, signing for FC Irtysh Pavlodar.

== Career statistics ==
As of match played 29 September 2023

Club	Season	League			National Cup		Continental		Other		Total	
Club	Season	Division	Apps	Goals	Apps	Goals	Apps	Goals	Apps	Goals	Apps	Goals
Laktaši	2008–09	Premier League of Bosnia and Herzegovina	17	0							17	0
Laktaši	2009–10	Premier League of Bosnia and Herzegovina	15	1							15	1
Laktaši	Total		32	1							32	1
Rad	2009–10	Serbian SuperLiga	12	2	0	0	0	0	0	0	12	2
Rad	2010–11	Serbian SuperLiga	29	4	1	0	0	0	0	0	30	4
Rad	2011–12	Serbian SuperLiga	25	3	1	0	4	3 (Note: Appearance(s) in UEFA Europa League)	0	0	30	6
Rad	Total		66	9	2	0	4	3	0	0	72	12
Sheriff Tiraspol	2012–13	Moldovan National Division	28	4	2	0	6	0	1	0 (Note: Appearance(s) in Moldovan Super Cup)	37	4
Sheriff Tiraspol	2013–14	Moldovan National Division	24	0	2	1	8	0	1	0	35	1
Sheriff Tiraspol	Total		52	4	4	1	14	0	2	0	72	5
Simurq (loan)	2014–15	Azerbaijan Premier League	17	4	1	1	0	0	0	0	18	5
Al Fateh	2015–16	Saudi Pro League	2	0	0	0	-		-		2	0
Rad	2015–16	Serbian SuperLiga	13	0	0	0	-		-		13	0
Rad	2016–17	Serbian SuperLiga	17	0	1	0	-		-		18	0
Rad	Total		30	0	1	0	-	-	-	-	31	0
Shakhter Karagandy	2017	Kazakhstan Premier League	28	4	4	1	-		-		32	5
Astana	2018	Kazakhstan Premier League	9	0	0	0	3	0 (Note: Appearance(s) in UEFA Champions League)	1	0 (Note: Appearance(s) in Kazakhstan Super Cup)	13	0
Levadiakos	2018–19	Super League Greece	21	2	2	1	-		-		23	3
Irtysh Pavlodar	2019	Kazakhstan Premier League	14	2	0	0	-		-		14	2
Nasaf	2020	Uzbekistan Super League	25	6	2	1	-		-		27	7
Nasaf	2021	Uzbekistan Super League	24	6	5	1	7	1 (Note: Appearance(s) in AFC Cup)	1	0 (Note: Appearance(s) in Uzbekistan Super Cup)	37	8
Nasaf	2022	Uzbekistan Super League	24	1	4	0	7	3 (Note: Appearance(s) in AFC Champions League)	1	0	36	4
Nasaf	2023	Uzbekistan Super League	8	1	2	0	2	0	1	1	13	2
Career total			378	42	27	6	37	7	6	1	448	56

== Honours ==
Sheriff Tiraspol

- Moldovan National Division: 2012–13, 2013–14
- Moldovan Super Cup: 2013
