= Valery Fomichev =

Belarusian footballer

Personal information
- Date of birth: 23 March 1988 (age 38)
- Place of birth: Minsk, Belarusian SSR, Soviet Union
- Height: 2.02 m (6 ft 7 1/2 in)
- Position: Goalkeeper

Team information
- Current team: Energetik-BGATU Minsk

Youth career
- 2005–2007: Darida Minsk Raion

Senior career*
Years	Team	Apps	(Gls)
2007–2008	Kommunalnik Slonim	20	(0)
2009	Baranovichi	8	(0)
2009–2010	Gorodeya	45	(0)
2011	Belshina Bobruisk	7	(0)
2012	Dinamo Brest	21	(0)
2013	Shakhter Karagandy	0	(0)
2013–2015	Orduspor	22	(0)
2015	Dinamo Brest	8	(0)
2015	Olmaliq	8	(0)
2016–2017	Torpedo-BelAZ Zhodino	33	(0)
2017	Ordabasy	0	(0)
2019	Arsenal Dzerzhinsk	3	(0)
2019–2020	Krumkachy Minsk	28	(0)
2021–2022	Energetik-BGATU Minsk	0	(0)

Managerial career
- 2021–: Energetik-BGATU Minsk (gk coach)
- * Club domestic league appearances and goals as of 31 December 2022

Valery Fomichev (Belarusian: Валерый Фамiчоў; Russian: Валерий Фомичев; born 23 March 1988) is a Belarusian professional footballer.

During the winter of 2013 Fomichev accepted the citizenship of Kazakhstan.

== Honours ==
Torpedo-BelAZ Zhodino

- Belarusian Cup winner: 2015–16
