= Korede Aiyegbusi =

English footballer (born 1988)

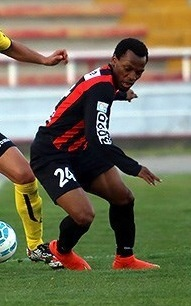

Personal information
- Full name: Olukorede Afolabi O. O. Aiyegbusi
- Date of birth: 15 July 1988 (age 38)
- Place of birth: Hackney, England
- Position: Defender

Youth career
- 2006–2007: Essex Knights
- 2008–2009: NC State Wolfpack

Senior career*
| Years | Team | Apps | (Gls) |
| 2009 | Cary Clarets | 7 | (1) |
| 2010–2012 | Sporting Kansas City | 9 | (0) |
| 2013 | FC Haka | 22 | (1) |
| 2014 | Servette | 11 | (0) |
| 2014–2015 | VfB Auerbach | 23 | (3) |
| 2015 | AFC United | 8 | (0) |
| 2015–2016 | Siah Jamegan | 12 | (0) |
| 2016–2017 | AFC Eskilstuna | 10 | (0) |
| 2017–2018 | Shakhter Karagandy | 20 | (1) |
| 2018–2019 | FC Amical Saint-Prex | 12 | (0) |
- * Club domestic league appearances and goals

Olukorede Afolabi O. O. Aiyegbusi(born 15 July 1988) is an English former footballer.

== Career ==
=== College and amateur ===
Aiyegbusi moved from England to the United States in 2006 to attend and play college soccer at the Community College of Baltimore County in Maryland, where he was a two-time National Junior College Athletic Association All-American and All-Maryland JUCO Conference first-team. He transferred to North Carolina State University in 2008, and went on to make 41 appearances for the Wolfpack, all of them starts.

During his college years Aiyegbusi also played for Cary Clarets in the USL Premier Development League.

=== Professional ===
Aiyegbusi was drafted in the second round (20th overall) of the 2010 MLS SuperDraft by Kansas City Wizards.

He made his professional debut on 27 March 2010, in Kansas City's opening game of the 2010 MLS season against D.C. United.

Aiyegbusi remained with Kansas City through the 2012 season before being released by mutual agreement on 3 December 2012. He subsequently entered the 2012 MLS Re-Entry Draft and became a free agent after going undrafted in both rounds of the draft.

On 21 February 2013 Aiyegbusi signed with First Division side FC Haka. After one season in Finland, Aiyegbusi signed for Swiss club Servette FC Genève on 3 January 2014.

On 10 August 2015, Aiyegbusi left VfB Auerbach after one season with the club to join Superettan side AFC United.

Aiyegbusi joined Iranian side Siah Jamegan in November 2015.

In January 2017, Aiyegbusi went on trial with Kazakhstan Premier League side Shakhter Karagandy.

=== International ===
Aiyegbusi represented Great Britain in the 2009 World University Games in Belgrade, Serbia.

== Personal life ==
Aiyegbusi holds dual British and Nigerian citizenship. He is the fourth born of five siblings. His cousin is fellow footballer Moses Makinde.

== Career statistics ==
=== Club ===
As of match played 5 November 2017

Appearances and goals by club, season and competition
| Club | Season | League | | | National Cup | | League Cup | | Continental | | Other | | Total | |
| Club | Season | Division | Apps | Goals | Apps | Goals | Apps | Goals | Apps | Goals | Apps | Goals | Apps | Goals |
|---|---|---|---|---|---|---|---|---|---|---|---|---|---|---|
| Sporting Kansas City | 2010 | MLS | 5 | 0 | 1 | 0 | – | | – | | – | | 5 | 0 |
| Sporting Kansas City | 2011 | MLS | 3 | 0 | 0 | 0 | – | | – | | 0 | 0 | 3 | 0 |
| Sporting Kansas City | 2012 | MLS | 1 | 0 | 0 | 0 | – | | – | | 0 | 0 | 1 | 0 |
| Sporting Kansas City | Total | | 9 | 0 | 1 | 0 | - | - | - | - | 0 | 0 | 10 | 0 |
| FC Haka | 2013 | Ykkönen | 22 | 1 | 2 | 0 | – | | – | | – | | 24 | 1 |
| Servette | 2013–14 | Swiss Challenge League | 11 | 0 | 0 | 0 | – | | – | | – | | 11 | 0 |
| VfB Auerbach | 2014–15 | Regionalliga Nordost | 23 | 3 | 0 | 0 | – | | – | | – | | 23 | 3 |
| AFC United | 2015 | Superettan | 8 | 0 | 0 | 0 | – | | – | | – | | 8 | 0 |
| Siah Jamegan Khorasan | 2015–16 | Persian Gulf Pro League | 12 | 0 | 0 | 0 | – | | – | | – | | 12 | 0 |
| AFC Eskilstuna | 2016 | Superettan | 10 | 0 | 0 | 0 | – | | – | | – | | 10 | 0 |
| Shakhter Karagandy | 2017 | Kazakhstan Premier League | 20 | 1 | 3 | 0 | – | | – | | – | | 23 | 1 |
| Career total | | | 115 | 5 | 6 | 0 | - | - | - | - | 0 | 0 | 121 | 5 |
