= Ruslan Valiullin =

Kazakhstani footballer

Personal information
- Full name: Ruslan Damirovich Valiullin
- Date of birth: 9 September 1994 (age 32)
- Place of birth: Oral, Kazakhstan
- Height: 1.80 m (5 ft 11 in)
- Position: Midfielder

Team information
- Current team: Turan
- Number: 28

Senior career*
Years	Team	Apps	(Gls)
2011–2017	Akzhayik	92	(12)
2017–2018	Aktobe	46	(3)
2019–2021	Tobol	62	(5)
2023–2024	Tobol	14	(0)
2025	Kyzylzhar	18	(0)
2026–	Turan	17	(3)

International career^{‡}
2016	Kazakhstan U21	1	(0)
2021–	Kazakhstan	4	(2)
- * Club domestic league appearances and goals as of 1 November 2026 ‡ National team caps and goals as of 22:10, 1 September 2021 (UTC)

Ruslan Damirovich Valiullin (Russian: Руслан Дамирович Валиуллин; Tatar: Руслан Дамир улы Вәлиуллин; born 9 September 1994) is a Kazakhstani footballer who plays as a midfielder for Kazakhstan First League club Turan, and the Kazakhstan national team.

== Club career ==
On 23 August 2023, Tobol announced the return of Valiullin to their squad until the end of the 2023 season following a ban for doping.

== International career ==
Valiullin made his international debut for Kazakhstan on 28 March 2021 in a 2022 FIFA World Cup qualification match against France.

Following scoring two goals in Kazakhstan's 2–2 draw at home to Ukraine in the 2022 FIFA World Cup qualifier on 1 September 2021, Valiullin was informed that he had failed a drugs test after his club, Tobol, played against MŠK Žilina in the UEFA Europa Conference League on 12 August 2021.

== Career statistics ==
=== International ===
As of 1 September 2021

Kazakhstan
Year	Apps	Goals
2021	4	2
Total	4	2

=== International goals ===
Scores and results list Kazakhstan's goal tally first.

No.	Date	Venue	Opponent	Score	Result	Competition
1.	1 September 2021	Astana Arena, Nur-Sultan, Kazakhstan	Ukraine	1–1	2–2	2022 FIFA World Cup qualification
2.	1 September 2021	Astana Arena, Nur-Sultan, Kazakhstan	Ukraine	2–2	2–2	2022 FIFA World Cup qualification
