= Jakub Chleboun =

Czech footballer (born 1985)

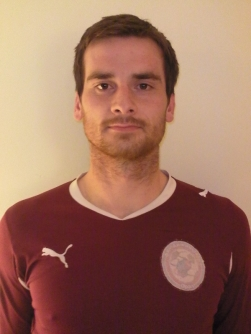

Personal information
- Date of birth: 24 March 1985 (age 41)
- Place of birth: Czechoslovakia
- Height: 1.95 m (6 ft 5 in)
- Position: Defender

Team information
- Current team: TJ Sokol České Heřmanice
- Number: 15

Senior career*
Years	Team	Apps	(Gls)
2004–2005	Slavia Prague	4	(0)
2005–2006	Xaverov		
2006–2011	Hradec Králové	100	(2)
2012–2013	Akzhayik	58	(8)
2014	Irtysh	9	(0)
2014–2018	Hradec Králové	59	(0)
2017	→Shakhter Karagandy	14	(1)
2018–2022	Ústí nad Orlicí	86	(12)
2022-	České Heřmanice		

International career^{‡}
2004	Czech Republic U-19	7	(0)
- * Club domestic league appearances and goals as of 7 January 2023 ‡ National team caps and goals as of 4 June 2011

Jakub Chleboun (born 24 March 1985) is a Czech football player who currently plays for TJ Sokol České Heřmanice.
