= Daurenbek Tazhimbetov =

Kazakhstani footballer

Personal information
- Date of birth: 2 July 1985 (age 41)
- Place of birth: Ayteke Bi, Soviet Union, Kazakh SSR
- Height: 1.87 m (6 ft 2 in)
- Position: Forward

Senior career*
Years	Team	Apps	(Gls)
2003–2009	Kaisar	121	(19)
2010–2012	Ordabasy	82	(27)
2013	Shakhter Karagandy	16	(3)
2013	→ Astana (loan)	4	(0)
2014–2016	Ordabasy	50	(6)
2016–2017	Taraz	15	(2)
2017	Shakhter Karagandy	14	(3)
2017	Atyrau	9	(0)
2018	Kaisar	6	(0)
2019–2020	Akzhayik		

International career
2011–2015	Kazakhstan	5	(3)
- * Club domestic league appearances and goals

Daurenbek Tazhimbetov (Kazakh: Дәуренбек Тәжімбетов; born 2 July 1985 is a Kazakh former professional footballer who played as a forward.

== Career ==
In July 2013, Tazhimbetov joined FC Astana on loan.

== Career statistics ==
=== Club ===
Appearances and goals by club, season and competition
Club	Season	League		Cup (Note: Includes Kazakhstan Cup)		Europe		Total	
Club	Season	Apps	Goals	Apps	Goals	Apps	Goals	Apps	Goals
Kaisar-Zhas	2003		2		0	–			2
Kaisar-Zhas	2004		0	0	0	–			0
Kaisar	2004	20	1	1	0	–		21	1
Kaisar	2005		3	3	2	–		3	5
Kaisar	2006	27	6	1	1	–		28	7
Kaisar	2007	28	5	5	1	–		33	6
Kaisar	2008	21	0	2	0	–		23	0
Kaisar	2009	25	4	4	1	–		29	5
Ordabasy	2010	28	8	4	3	–		32	11
Ordabasy	2011	30	11	5	4	–		35	15
Ordabasy	2012	24	7	1	0	–		25	7
Career total		203	45	26	12	0	0	230	67

=== International ===
Scores and results list Kazakhstan's goal tally first, score column indicates score after each Tazhimbetov goal.

List of international goals scored by Daurenbek Tazhimbetov
No.	Date	Venue	Opponent	Score	Result	Competition
1	1 June 2012	Almaty Central Stadium, Almaty, Kazakhstan	Kyrgyzstan	2–0	5–2	Friendly
2	1 June 2012	Almaty Central Stadium, Almaty, Kazakhstan	Kyrgyzstan	3–1	5–2	Friendly
3	1 June 2012	Almaty Central Stadium, Almaty, Kazakhstan	Kyrgyzstan	5–2	5–2	Friendly
