= Jiří Valenta (footballer) =

Czech footballer

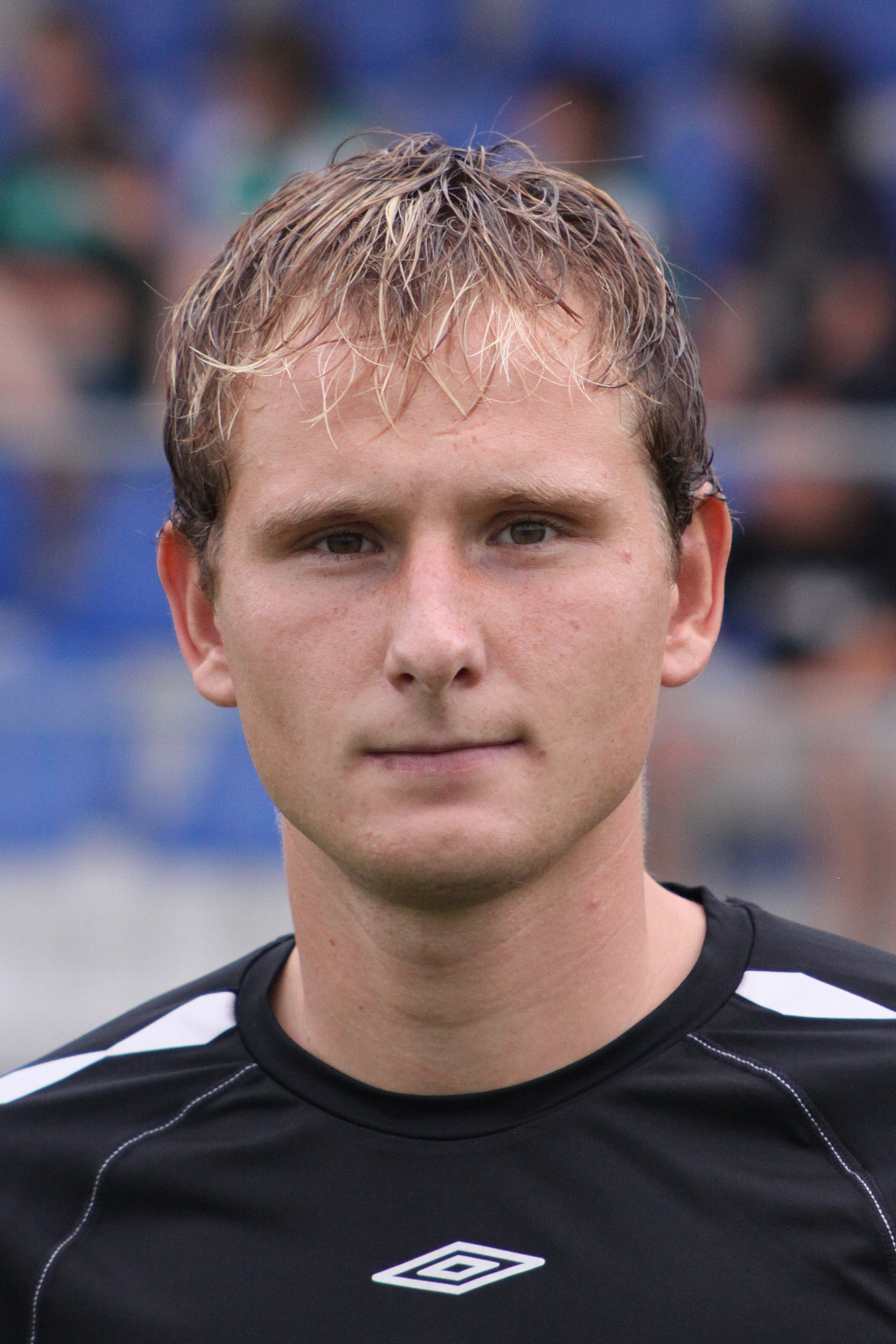

Personal information
- Full name: Jiří Valenta
- Date of birth: 14 February 1988 (age 38)
- Place of birth: Czechoslovakia
- Height: 1.78 m (5 ft 10 in)
- Position: Midfielder

Team information
- Current team: FK Lety

Youth career
- 1995: Slovan Kunratice
- 1996–2006: Slavia Prague

Senior career*
Years	Team	Apps	(Gls)
2006–2012	Jablonec 97	70	(5)
2010–2011	→ 1. Slovácko (loan)	23	(3)
2011	→ Senica (loan)	14	(2)
2012	→ Viktoria Žižkov (loan)	13	(2)
2012–2016	1. Slovácko	97	(17)
2016–2019	Mladá Boleslav	24	(2)
2017	→ Shakhter Karagandy (loan)	13	(0)
2019	→ Táborsko (loan)	10	(2)
2019–2020	Fotbal Třinec	25	(8)
2020–2021	Motorlet Prague	7	(2)
2021–2023	Bischofswerda	37	(11)
2023–2024	USV Oed/Zeillern		
2024–	FK Lety		

International career
2003–2004	Czech Republic U16	13	(7)
2004–2005	Czech Republic U17	15	(6)
2005–2006	Czech Republic U18	4	(1)
2006–2007	Czech Republic U19	8	(1)
2007	Czech Republic U20	3	(0)
2009	Czech Republic U21	3	(1)
- * Club domestic league appearances and goals as of 12 November 2022

Jiří Valenta (born 14 February 1988) is a Czech footballer who plays for Czech club FK Lety.

== Honours ==
Czech Republic under-21

- FIFA U-20 World Cup runner-up (1) 2007
