= Serhiy Tkachuk =

Ukrainian-born Kazakhstani footballer

Personal information
- Full name: Serhiy Volodymyrovych Tkachuk
- Date of birth: 15 February 1992 (age 34)
- Place of birth: Kyiv, Ukraine
- Height: 1.96 m (6 ft 5 in)
- Position: Goalkeeper

Youth career
- 2005–2009: Dynamo Kyiv

Senior career*
Years	Team	Apps	(Gls)
2009–2011	Dynamo Kyiv	0	(0)
2011	→ Nyva Ternopil (loan)	2	(0)
2011–2013	Shakhter Karagandy	6	(0)
2014–2016	Kairat	6	(0)
2016–2017	Shakhter Karagandy	2	(0)
2017	Caspiy	0	(0)
2018–2019	Akzhayik	12	(0)
Total		28	(0)

International career
2008	Ukraine-16	1	(0)
2010	Ukraine-18	1	(0)
2012–2013	Kazakhstan-21	11	(0)
- * Club domestic league appearances and goals

Serhiy Tkachuk or Sergey Tkachuk (Ukrainian: Сергій Володимирович Ткачук; born 15 February 1992) is a Ukrainian former professional footballer who played as a goalkeeper.

== Career ==
=== Club ===
Tkachuk is the product of FC Dynamo Kyiv sportive system and become to attend the football school at age 7.

On 2 February 2016, Tkachuk left FC Kairat.

== Personal life ==
During the winter of 2012 Tkachuk accepted the citizenship of Kazakhstan.

== Honours ==
=== Club ===
FC Kairat

- Kazakhstan Cup (1): 2014
