= Gevorg Najaryan =

Kazakh footballer (born 1998)

Personal information
- Date of birth: 6 January 1998 (age 28)
- Place of birth: Yerevan, Armenia
- Height: 1.75 m (5 ft 9 in)
- Position: Central midfielder

Senior career*
Years	Team	Apps	(Gls)
2015	Shakhter Karagandy	8	(1)
2016–2018	Astana	2	(0)
2017	→ Shakhter Karagandy (loan)	9	(0)
2018–2021	Shakhter Karagandy	84	(3)
2022	Pyunik	9	(0)
2022–2023	Van	21	(0)
2023–2024	Atyrau	31	(0)

International career^{‡}
2014	Kazakhstan U17	3	(0)
2015–2016	Kazakhstan U19	6	(0)
2017–2020	Kazakhstan U21	20	(1)
2019	Kazakhstan	1	(0)
- * Club domestic league appearances and goals as of 16 November 2024 ‡ National team caps and goals as of 17 November 2020

Gevorg Najaryan (Armenian: Գևորգ Նաջարյան; born 6 January 1998) is a footballer who plays as a central midfielder. Born in Armenia, he represented Kazakhstan internationally.

== Club career ==
=== Shakhter Karagandy ===
On 11 March 2015, Najaryan made his senior team debut in Kazakhstan Premier League against FC Ordabasy at Metallurg Stadium, replacing Vladislav Vasiliev at the 83rd minute by coach Vladimir Cheburin. On 5 April 2015, Najaryan scored his first senior team goal against FC Tobol at 59th minute. The goal was the first goal in the match but Shakhter Karagandy was defeat by 4–1. Najaryan played eight games and scored a goal for Shakhter Karagandy.

=== Astana ===
In January 2016, Najaryan moved to defending Kazakhstan Premier League champions FC Astana.

On 6 July 2017, Najaryan returned to Shakhter Karagandy on loan for the remainder of the 2017 season.

=== Pyunik ===
On 16 February 2022, Pyunik announced the signing of Najaryan.

=== Van ===
On 8 September 2022, Van announced the signing of Najaryan from Pyunik.

== International ==
In May 2018, Najaryan was called up to represent Western Armenia and in 2019 played 1 game for Kazakhstan.

== Career statistics ==
As of match played 11 November 2018

Appearances and goals by club, season and competition
Club	Season	League			National Cup		Continental		Other		Total	
Club	Season	Division	Apps	Goals	Apps	Goals	Apps	Goals	Apps	Goals	Apps	Goals
Shakhter Karagandy	2015	Kazakhstan Premier League	8	1	1	0	–		–		9	1
Astana	2016	Kazakhstan Premier League	1	0	4	0	2	0	0	0	7	0
Astana	2017	Kazakhstan Premier League	1	0	1	0	0	0	0	0	2	0
Astana	Total		2	0	5	0	2	0	0	0	9	0
Shakhter Karagandy (loan)	2017	Kazakhstan Premier League	9	0	0	0	–		–		9	0
Shakhter Karagandy	2018	Kazakhstan Premier League	25	2	3	0	–		–		28	2
Shakhter Karagandy	2019	Kazakhstan Premier League	28	0	1	0	–		–		29	0
Shakhter Karagandy	2020	Kazakhstan Premier League	12	0	0	0	–		–		12	0
Shakhter Karagandy	2021	Kazakhstan Premier League	19	1	7	0	4	0	1	0	31	1
Shakhter Karagandy	Total		84	3	11	0	4	0	1	0	100	3
Pyunik	2021–22	Armenian Premier League	0	0	0	0	–		–		0	0
Career total			103	3	17	0	6	0	1	0	127	3

== Honours ==
=== Pyunik ===
- Armenian Premier League: 2021–22

==== Astana ====
- Kazakhstan Premier League (1): 2016
- Kazakhstan Cup (1): 2016
