= 2019 FC Shakhter Karagandy season =

FC Shakhter Karagandy
2019 season
- Chairman: Sergei Yegorov
- Manager: Nikolay Kostov
- Stadium: Shakhter Stadium
- Premier League: 9th
- Kazakhstan Cup: Last 16 vs Taraz
- Top goalscorer: League: Two Players (8); All: Two Players (8)
Home colours	Away colours

The 2019 FC Shakhter Karagandy season was the 29th successive season that the club will play in the Kazakhstan Premier League, the highest tier of association football in Kazakhstan. Shakhter finished the season in 9th position whilst they were knocked out of the Kazakhstan Cup at the last 16 stage by FC Taraz.

== Season events ==
On 20 June, Shakhter Karagandy extended their contract with Donjet Shkodra until the end of the 2020 season.

On 26 June, Lukáš Droppa left Shakhter Karagandy.

On 9 July, Shakhter announced the signing of Reginaldo from Kukësi.

== Squad ==
As of match played 10 November 2019

No.	Name	Nationality	Position	Date of birth (age)	Signed from	Signed in	Apps.	Goals
Goalkeepers|-
1	Abylaikhan Duysen	(Kazakhstan)	GK	3 June 1994 (aged 25)	Astana	2018	8	0
30	Igor Shatskiy	(Kazakhstan)	GK	11 May 1989 (aged 30)	Academy	2010	119	0
40	Yegor Tsuprikov	(Kazakhstan)	GK	27 May 1997 (aged 22)	Bolat	2018	3	0
Defenders
3	Yevhen Tkachuk	(Ukraine)	DF	27 June 1991 (aged 28)	Stal Kamianske	2018	53	3
5	Artem Baranovskyi	(Ukraine)	DF	17 March 1990 (aged 29)	Istiklol	2019	34	1
13	Stanislav Lunin	(Kazakhstan)	DF	2 May 1993 (aged 26)	Irtysh Pavlodar	2019	57	0
19	Yevgeny Tarasov	(Kazakhstan)	DF	16 April 1985 (aged 34)	Vostok	2009	201	8
23	Birzhan Kulbekov	(Kazakhstan)	DF	22 April 1994 (aged 25)		2018	13	0
29	Niyaz Shugayev	(Kazakhstan)	DF	14 September 1999 (aged 20)	Youth Team	2019	17	0
55	Ruslan Alimbayev	(Kazakhstan)	DF	2 March 1997 (aged 22)	Olé Brasil	2015	7	0
84	Anton Chichulin	(Kazakhstan)	DF	27 November 1984 (aged 34)	Atyrau	2018	24	1
Midfielders
7	Gevorg Najaryan	(Kazakhstan)	MF	6 January 1998 (aged 21)	Astana	2018	74	3
8	Baūyrzhan Baytana	(Kazakhstan)	MF	6 May 1992 (aged 27)	Taraz	2019	12	0
9	Ivan Pešić	(Croatia)	MF	6 April 1992 (aged 27)	loan from Dinamo București	2019	34	8
10	Yerkebulan Nurgaliyev	(Kazakhstan)	MF	12 September 1993 (aged 26)	Akzhayik	2019	28	4
18	Luwagga Kizito	(Uganda)	MF	20 December 1993 (aged 25)	loan from Politehnica Iași	2019	24	5
21	Dmitry Bachek	(Kazakhstan)	MF	13 December 2000 (aged 18)	Youth Team	2019	7	0
22	Marat Shakhmetov	(Kazakhstan)	MF	6 February 1989 (aged 30)	Akzhayik	2017	88	8
24	Ruslan Tutkyshev	(Kazakhstan)	MF	18 February 1999 (aged 20)	Youth Team	2019	0	0
25	Miloš Vidović	(Serbia)	MF	3 October 1989 (aged 30)	Slaven Belupo	2019	13	0
27	Temirlan Adilov	(Kazakhstan)	MF	8 June 1997 (aged 22)	Youth Team	2019	0	0
72	Sergei Skorykh	(Kazakhstan)	MF	25 May 1984 (aged 35)	Kyzylzhar	2019	86	3
77	Berik Shaikhov	(Kazakhstan)	MF	20 February 1994 (aged 25)	Akzhayik	2019	15	0
88	Donjet Shkodra	(Kosovo)	MF	30 April 1989 (aged 30)	Kukësi	2019	29	3
Forwards
11	Sergei Zenjov	(Estonia)	FW	20 April 1989 (aged 30)	KS Cracovia	2019	30	8
17	Oralkhan Omirtayev	(Kazakhstan)	FW	16 July 1998 (aged 21)	Academy	2015	74	7
60	Sergey Vetrov	(Kazakhstan)	FW	11 November 1994 (aged 24)	Bolat	2019	26	2
70	Jean-Ali Payruz	(Kazakhstan)	FW	12 August 1999 (aged 20)	Youth Team	2019	30	1
99	Reginaldo	(Mozambique)	FW	14 June 1990 (aged 29)	Kukësi	2019	14	3
Left during the season
6	Lukáš Droppa	(Czech Republic)	MF	22 April 1989 (aged 30)	Slovan Bratislava	2018	25	0

== Transfers ==
=== In ===
Date	Position	Nationality	Name	From	Fee	Ref.
6 December 2018	MF	(Kazakhstan)	Yerkebulan Nurgaliyev	Akzhayik	Undisclosed	
27 December 2018	DF	(Kazakhstan)	Berik Shaikhov	Akzhayik	Undisclosed	
13 February 2019	DF	(Ukraine)	Artem Baranovskyi	Istiklol	Undisclosed	
16 February 2019	FW	(Estonia)	Sergei Zenjov	KS Cracovia	Undisclosed	
24 February 2019	MF	(Kosovo)	Donjet Shkodra	Kukësi	Undisclosed	
Summer 2019	FW	(Kazakhstan)	Sergey Vetrov	Bolat	Undisclosed	
27 June 2019	MF	(Serbia)	Miloš Vidović	Slaven Belupo	Undisclosed	
3 July 2019	MF	(Kazakhstan)	Baūyrzhan Baytana	Taraz	Free	
9 July 2019	FW	(Mozambique)	Reginaldo	Kukësi	Undisclosed	
21 August 2019	DF	(Kazakhstan)	Stanislav Lunin	Irtysh Pavlodar	Free	

=== Loans in ===
Date from	Position	Nationality	Name	From	Date to	Ref.
14 February 2019	MF	(Croatia)	Ivan Pešić	Dinamo București	End of Season	
13 March 2019	MF	(Uganda)	Luwagga Kizito	Politehnica Iași	End of Season	

=== Released ===
Date	Position	Nationality	Name	Joined	Date	Ref.
	MF	(Belarus)	Alyaksandr Valadzko	Shakhtyor Soligorsk	20 December 2018	
	MF	(Montenegro)	Damir Kojašević	Radnički Niš	16 January 2019	
	DF	(Croatia)	Mateo Mužek	St Mirren	26 January 2019	
26 June 2019	MF	(Czech Republic)	Lukáš Droppa	Gaz Metan Mediaș	29 June 2019	
31 December 2019	GK	(Kazakhstan)	Igor Shatskiy	Tobol	31 December 2019	
31 December 2019	DF	(Kazakhstan)	Anton Chichulin			
31 December 2019	DF	(Kazakhstan)	Stanislav Lunin			
31 December 2019	DF	(Kazakhstan)	Berik Shaikhov	Kyzylzhar	19 February 2020	
31 December 2019	DF	(Kazakhstan)	Yevgeny Tarasov			
31 December 2019	DF	(Ukraine)	Artem Baranovskyi	Buxoro		
31 December 2019	MF	(Kazakhstan)	Dmitry Bachek			
31 December 2019	MF	(Kazakhstan)	Baūyrzhan Baytana	Taraz	10 August 2020	
31 December 2019	MF	(Kazakhstan)	Sergei Skorykh	Kyzylzhar	7 February 2020	
31 December 2019	FW	(Kazakhstan)	Oralkhan Omirtayev	Tobol	1 January 2020	
31 December 2019	FW	(Mozambique)	Reginaldo	Kaisar	5 February 2020	

== Competitions ==
=== Premier League ===
==== Results summary ====
Overall								Home						Away					
Pld	W	D	L	GF	GA	GD	Pts	W	D	L	GF	GA	GD	W	D	L	GF	GA	GD
33	9	8	16	40	47	−7	35	7	2	7	20	15	+5	2	6	9	20	32	−12

Last updated: 10 November 2019.
Source: See Results

==== Results by round ====
Round	1	2	3	4	5	6	7	8	9	10	11	12	13	14	15	16	17	18	19	20	21	22	23	24	25	26	27	28	29	30	31	32	33
Ground	A	A	H	A	H	A	H	H	A	H	A	H	A	H	A	H	A	A	H	A	H	H	H	A	H	A	H	A	A	H	H	A	A
Result	L	L	L	D	W	W	L	W	D	W	W	L	L	D	D	W	D	D	W	L	W	L	W	L	L	L	L	L	D	D	L	L	L
Position	10	9	11	10	7	7	7	7	7	7	7	7	7	7	7	7	7	7	6	7	7	7	7	7	7	7	7	8	8	8	8	8	9

Source: See Results
A = Away; H = Home; W = Win; D = Draw; L = Loss

==== Results ====
9 March 2019 1	Ordabasy	3 – 0	Shakhter Karagandy	Shymkent
15:00 (UTC+6)	Malyi (yellow card) 63'; João Paulo 71', 83' (yellow card) 81'; Mahlangu 78'	Report	Najaryan (yellow card) 56'	Stadium: Kazhymukan Munaitpasov Stadium; Attendance: 6,500; Referee: Aydin Rakhimbayev

15 March 2019 2	Kairat	2 – 1	Shakhter Karagandy	Almaty
18:45 (UTC+6)	Eppel 28' (pen.); Kuat (yellow card) 45'; Shvyrev 76'; Abiken (yellow card) 80'; R.Orazov (yellow card) 88'	Report	Chichulin (yellow card) 24'; Zenjov 81'; Shakhmetov (yellow card) 89'	Stadium: Central Stadium; Attendance: 4,200; Referee: Bakhyt Kyzylbaev

31 March 2019 3	Shakhter Karagandy	0 – 1	Tobol	Nur-Sultan
15:00 (UTC+6)	Najaryan (yellow card) 51'	Report	Kankava (yellow card) 4'; Žulpa (yellow card) 80'; Kleshchenko (yellow card) 84'; Sebai 88'	Stadium: Astana Arena; Attendance: 1,000; Referee: Denis Tevyashov
Note: Match played at the Astana Arena instead of Shakhter's regular home ground, Shakhter Stadium. Astana was re-named Nur-Sultan on 23 March 2019.

7 April 2019 4	Atyrau	0 – 0	Shakhter Karagandy	Nur-Sultan
17:00 (UTC+6)	R.Dzhumatov (yellow card) 68'; Kubík (yellow card) 90'	Report	Kizito (yellow card) 89'	Stadium: Astana Arena; Attendance: 500; Referee: Denis Izmailov
Note: Match played at the Astana Arena instead of Atyrau's regular home ground, Munaishy Stadium. Astana was re-named Nur-Sultan on 23 March 2019.

14 April 2019 5	Shakhter Karagandy	4 – 0	Irtysh Pavlodar	Nur-Sultan
15:00 (UTC+6)	Pešić 2', 19' (pen.); Kizito 8'; Shakhmetov (yellow card) 40'; Baranovskyi (yellow card) 48'; Tkachuk 50'	Report	Darabayev (yellow card) 30'; Cañas (yellow card) 48'; M.Raimbek (yellow card) 78'	Stadium: Astana Arena; Attendance: 1,000; Referee: Bulat Saryev
Note: Match played at the Astana Arena instead of Shakhter's regular home ground, Shakhter Stadium. Astana was re-named Nur-Sultan on 23 March 2019.

20 April 2019 6	Taraz	1 – 2	Shakhter Karagandy	Taraz
17:00 (UTC+6)	Gian (yellow card) 23'; M.Amirkhanov (yellow card) 29'; Nyuiadzi 37'; I.Pikalkin (yellow card) 50' (yellow-red card) 60'	Report	Baranovskyi 8'; Shakhmetov 34'; Tkachuk (yellow card) 54'; Kizito (yellow card) 70'; Shatskiy (yellow card) 88'	Stadium: Central Stadium; Attendance: 3,000; Referee: Zhandos Abzhan

27 April 2019 7	Shakhter Karagandy	0 – 1	Kaisar	Nur-Sultan
15:00 (UTC+6)	Zenjov (yellow card) 58'; Baranovskyi (yellow card) 60'; Shkodra (yellow card) 70' (yellow-red card) 89'	Report	Mbombo 20'; S.Abzalov (yellow card) 83'; Tagybergen (yellow card) 84'; Grigorenko (yellow card) 86'	Stadium: Astana Arena; Attendance: 500; Referee: Furkat Atajanov
Note: Match played at the Astana Arena instead of Shakhter's regular home ground, Shakhter Stadium. Astana was re-named Nur-Sultan on 23 March 2019.

1 May 2019 8	Shakhter Karagandy	3 – 0	Aktobe	Nur-Sultan
15:00 (UTC+6)	Tkachuk (yellow card) 13'; Zenjov (yellow card) 44' (goal) 75'; Omirtayev (yellow card) 61' (goal) 68'; Pešić 90+3'	Report	A.Tanzharikov (yellow card) 50'	Stadium: Astana Arena; Attendance: 500; Referee: Aleksandr Zatula
Note: Match played at the Astana Arena instead of Shakhter's regular home ground, Shakhter Stadium. Astana was re-named Nur-Sultan on 23 March 2019.

5 May 2019 9	Okzhetpes	2 – 2	Shakhter Karagandy	Kokshetau
15:00 (UTC+6)	Zorić (yellow card) 45' (goal) 59'; Kislitsyn (yellow card) 74'; Alves 78'; Moldakaraev (yellow card) 79'	Report	Zenjov 73', 84'; Tkachuk (yellow card) 74'; J.Payruz (yellow card) 90+1'	Stadium: Okzhetpes Stadium; Attendance: 2,100; Referee: Bakhyt Kyzylbaev

12 May 2019 10	Shakhter Karagandy	2 – 0	Zhetysu	Nur-Sultan
15:00 (UTC+6)	J.Payruz 2' (yellow card) 53'; Tkachuk (yellow card) 58'; Najaryan (yellow card) 70'; Pešić 86'	Report	Naumov (yellow card) 27'; O.Kerimzhanov (yellow card) 30' (yellow-red card) 59'; Adamović (yellow card) 76'; Zhaksylykov (yellow card) 90+3'	Stadium: Astana Arena; Attendance: 500; Referee: Zhandos Abzhan
Note: Match played at the Astana Arena instead of Shakhter's regular home ground, Shakhter Stadium. Astana was re-named Nur-Sultan on 23 March 2019.

19 May 2019 11	Astana	1 – 2	Shakhter Karagandy	Nur-Sultan
19:00 (UTC+6)	Murtazayev 35'; Tomasov (yellow card) 77'	Report	Shakhmetov (yellow card) 59' (goal) 78' (pen.); Zenjov 87'; Najaryan (yellow card) 90+3'	Stadium: Astana Arena; Attendance: 2,000; Referee: Aleksandr Gauzer
Note: Astana was re-named Nur-Sultan on 23 March 2019.

26 May 2019 12	Shakhter Karagandy	1 – 2	Kairat	Nur-Sultan
18:00 (UTC+6)	B.Shaikhov (yellow card) 26'; Shkodra 29'; Nurgaliyev (yellow card) 56'; Chichulin (yellow card) 90+4'	Report	Zhukov (yellow card) 32'; Eseola 74', 79'; Kuat (yellow card) 75'; Eppel (yellow card) 90+2'; Abiken (yellow card) 90+3'	Stadium: Astana Arena; Attendance: 1,000; Referee: Bolat Saryev
Note: Match played at the Astana Arena instead of Shakhter's regular home ground, Shakhter Stadium. Astana was re-named Nur-Sultan on 23 March 2019.

31 May 2019 13	Tobol	2 – 0	Shakhter Karagandy	Kostanay
19:00 (UTC+6)	Turysbek 25'; Nurgaliev (yellow card) 46' (goal) 60'	Report	Shakhmetov (yellow card) 90+1'	Stadium: Central Stadium; Attendance: 3,000; Referee: Daniyar Sakhi

16 June 2019 14	Shakhter Karagandy	1 – 1	Atyrau	Karaganda
19:00 (UTC+6)	Shkodra 22' (yellow card) 69'	Report	A.Makuov (yellow card) 58'; Tkachuk (yellow card) 61'; Bjedov 64'; A.Rodionov (yellow card) 83'	Stadium: Shakhter Stadium; Attendance: 5,500; Referee: Denis Tevyashov

23 June 2019 15	Irtysh Pavlodar	0 – 0	Shakhter Karagandy	Pavlodar
19:00 (UTC+6)	Cañas (yellow card) 46'; Paragulgov (yellow card) 49'	Report	N.Shugayev (red card) 72'	Stadium: Central Stadium; Attendance: 3,000; Referee: Askhat Abdanbayev

30 June 2019 16	Shakhter Karagandy	1 – 0	Taraz	Karaganda
19:00 (UTC+6)	Shakhmetov (yellow card) 8'; Omirtayev 15'; Tkachuk (yellow card) 29'; Najaryan (yellow card) 63'	Report	M.Amirkhanov (yellow card) 51'; Elivelto (yellow card) 63'	Stadium: Shakhter Stadium; Attendance: 5,000; Referee: Bakhyt Kyzylbaev

6 July 2019 17	Kaisar	2 – 2	Shakhter Karagandy	Kyzylorda
20:00 (UTC+6)	Graf 17'; Mbombo 29'	Report	Nurgaliyev 35'; Najaryan (yellow card) 50'; Pešić 63'; Shatskiy (yellow card) 90'	Stadium: Gani Muratbayev Stadium; Attendance: 6,500; Referee: Georgiy Chekhovskiy

13 July 2019 18	Aktobe	2 – 2	Shakhter Karagandy	Aktobe
21:00 (UTC+6)	A.Kakimov 64'; Aimbetov 70'; A.Tanzharikov (yellow card) 73'	Report	Tkachuk (yellow card) 10'; Shkodra (yellow card) 15'; Zenjov 30'; Pešić 38'; Shakhmetov (yellow card) 53'; Kizito (yellow card) 73'	Stadium: Central Stadium; Attendance: 8,000; Referee: Furkat Atajanov

21 July 2019 19	Shakhter Karagandy	1 – 0	Okzhetpes	Karaganda
19:00 (UTC+6)	Tkachuk (yellow card) 24' (goal) 57'; Shakhmetov (yellow card) 63'; Nurgaliyev (yellow card) 66'	Report	S.Zhumakhanov (red card) 64'; Dimov (yellow card) 78'	Stadium: Shakhter Stadium; Attendance: 4,000; Referee: Aydin Rakhimbayev

27 July 2019 20	Zhetysu	2 – 0	Shakhter Karagandy	Taldıqorğan
19:00 (UTC+6)	Lebedzew (yellow card) 7'; Toshev 21', 28'; E.Altynbekov (yellow card) 55'; Adamović (yellow card) 60'	Report	N.Shugayev (yellow card) 12'; Kizito (yellow card) 19'; Zenjov (yellow card) 29'; Shakhmetov (yellow card) 63'	Stadium: Zhetysu Stadium; Attendance: 2,500; Referee: Askhat Abdanbayev

4 August 2019 21	Shakhter Karagandy	1 – 0	Astana	Karaganda
19:30 (UTC+6)	Pešić 39'; J.Payruz (yellow card) 41'; Najaryan (yellow card) 83'; Shatskiy (yellow card) 90+4'	Report	Muzhikov (yellow card) 63'; Mayewski (yellow card) 68'	Stadium: Shakhter Stadium; Attendance: 7,000; Referee: Ruslan Omarov

11 August 2019 22	Shakhter Karagandy	1 – 2	Ordabasy	Karaganda
19:30 (UTC+6)	Nurgaliyev 59'; Baytana (yellow card) 85'	Report	Kovalchuk (yellow card) 19'; Shchotkin 30'; Mehanović 51'; Mahlangu (yellow card) 60'; M.Tolebek (yellow card) 90+2'	Stadium: Shakhter Stadium; Attendance: 7,000; Referee: Igor Chesnokov

18 August 2019 23	Shakhter Karagandy	3 – 0	Kaisar	Karaganda
19:00 (UTC+6)	Shkodra 52'; Nurgaliyev 61'; Zenjov (yellow card) 70' (goal) 75'	Report	Mbombo (yellow card) 47'; Sadownichy (yellow card) 54'	Stadium: Shakhter Stadium; Attendance: 6,000; Referee: Bagdat Abdullaev

24 August 2019 24	Ordabasy	3 – 2	Shakhter Karagandy	Shymkent
19:00 (UTC+6)	Diakate 22' (pen.), 90+9' (pen.); Dosmagambetov (yellow card) 56'; Shchotkin 70'; M.Tolebek (yellow card) 90+3'	Report	Nurgaliyev (yellow card) 44'; Kizito 50', 59'; Baytana (yellow card) 57'; Omirtayev (yellow card) 90+6'; Y.Tarasov (red card) 90+7'	Stadium: Kazhymukan Munaitpasov Stadium; Attendance: 2,700; Referee: Bulat Saryev

31 August 2019 25	Shakhter Karagandy	0 – 4	Kairat	Karaganda
17:00 (UTC+6)	Nurgaliyev (yellow card) 12'; Kizito (yellow card) 67'	Report	Eppel 2' (yellow card) 88'; Islamkhan 52'; Eseola 69'; Wrzesiński 78'	Stadium: Shakhter Stadium; Attendance: 5,000; Referee: Askhat Abdanbayev

15 September 2019 26	Astana	2 – 1	Shakhter Karagandy	Nur-Sultan
19:00 (UTC+6)	Tomasov 54'; Vidović 66' (o.g.); Shomko (yellow card) 67'	Report	Shkodra 34'; Kizito (yellow card) 80'; Reginaldo (yellow card) 90'	Stadium: Astana Arena; Attendance: 3,500; Referee: Bakhyt Kyzylbaev
Note: Astana was re-named Nur-Sultan on 23 March 2019.

22 September 2019 27	Shakhter Karagandy	0 – 1	Tobol	Karaganda
16:00 (UTC+6)	Shakhmetov (red card) 62'	Report	Miroshnichenko (yellow card) 39'; Kankava (yellow card) 62'; Abilgazy (yellow card) 70'; Kassaï 89'; A.Sherstov (yellow card) 90'	Stadium: Shakhter Stadium; Attendance: 3,000; Referee: Timur Kumashev

28 September 2019 28	Irtysh Pavlodar	4 – 2	Shakhter Karagandy	Pavlodar
16:00 (UTC+6)	Georgijević 66'; Manzorro 68', 86'; Mingazow 90'	Report	Kizito 15', 36' (yellow card) 75'; Chichulin (yellow card) 87'	Stadium: Central Stadium; Attendance: 2,000; Referee: Georgiy Chekhovskiy

20 October 2019 30	Taraz	0 – 0	Shakhter Karagandy	Taraz
16:00 (UTC+6)	A.Suley (yellow card) 16'; M.Amirkhanov (yellow card) 64'; M.Nuraly (yellow card) 80'	Report	Vidović (yellow card) 68'	Stadium: Central Stadium; Attendance: 3,000; Referee: Ruslan Omarov

26 October 2019 31	Shakhter Karagandy	2 – 2	Okzhetpes	Nur-Sultan
15:00 (UTC+6)	Reginaldo 5', 53'; J.Payruz (yellow card) 45'; Chichulin (yellow card) 85'	Report	Dmitrijev 29'; Stojanović (yellow card) 50'; T.Rudoselskiy 51'; Moldakaraev (yellow card) 67'; Zorić (red card) 84'; Nusserbayev (yellow card) 90+3'; R.Abzhanov (yellow card) 90+4'	Stadium: Astana Arena; Attendance: 1,000; Referee: Grigory Moskovchenko
Note: Match played at the Astana Arena instead of Shakhter's regular home ground, Shakhter Stadium.

30 October 2019 29	Shakhter Karagandy	0 – 1	Atyrau	Nur-Sultan
19:00 (UTC+6)	Nurgaliyev (yellow card) 82'; Baytana (yellow card) 90'; Vidović (red card) 90+2'	Report	Grzelczak 20'; E.Abdrakhmanov (yellow card) 87'; A.Rodionov (yellow card) 88'; Ngwem (red card) 90'	Stadium: Astana Arena; Attendance: 1,000; Referee: Georgiy Chekhovskiy
Note: Match originally scheduled for 4 October 2019 but postponed due to Atyrau's involvement in 2019 Kazakhstan Cup Final on 6 October 2019. Match played at the Astana Arena instead of Shakhter's regular home ground, Shakhter Stadium.

3 November 2019 32	Aktobe	3 – 2	Shakhter Karagandy	Aktobe
15:00 (UTC+6)	O.Kitsak 29'; Aimbetov 35' (pen.), 64'; E.Zhasanov (yellow card) 45'	Report	J.Payruz (yellow card) 33'; Pešić 46'; Shkodra (yellow card) 56'; Reginaldo 58'	Stadium: Central Stadium; Attendance: 5,000; Referee: Saken Bayimbet

10 November 2019 33	Zhetysu	3 – 2	Shakhter Karagandy	Taldıqorğan
15:00 (UTC+6)	Stepanyuk 30'; Adamović 38'; Toshev 52'	Report	Zenjov 10'; Reginaldo (yellow card) 23'; Nurgaliyev 63'; B.Shaikhov (yellow card) 66'; Najaryan (yellow card) 68'; Baranovskyi (yellow card) 81'	Stadium: Zhetysu Stadium; Attendance: 2,000; Referee: Anatolyi Vishnichenko

==== League table ====
Pos	Team	Pld	W	D	L	GF	GA	GD	Pts	Qualification or relegation
7	Okzhetpes	33	11	7	15	44	49	−5	40	
8	Irtysh Pavlodar	33	11	4	18	30	45	−15	37	
9	Shakhter Karagandy	33	9	8	16	40	47	−7	35	
10	Taraz (O)	33	7	8	18	28	60	−32	29	Qualification for the relegation play-offs
11	Atyrau (R)	33	6	8	19	25	58	−33	26	Relegation to the Kazakhstan First Division

Source: UEFA, Soccerway
Rules for classification: 1) Points; 2) Goal difference; 3) Matches won; 4) Goals scored; 5) Away goals scored; 6) Head-to-head points; 7) Head-to-head matches won; 8) Head-to-head goal difference; 9) Head-to-head goals scored; 10) Head-to-head away goals scored; 11) Draw.
(O) Play-off winners; (R) Relegated

=== Kazakhstan Cup ===
10 April 2019 Last 16	Taraz	2 – 0	Shakhter Karagandy	Taraz
18:00 (UTC+6)	G.Kan 8'; Nyuiadzi (+90+1)	Report	Najaryan (yellow card) 34'; Skorykh (yellow card) 45'; Tkachuk (yellow card) 80'; Droppa (yellow card) 83'; Y.Tarasov (yellow card) 89'	Stadium: Central Stadium; Attendance: 4,000; Referee: Sergey Nozhenko

== Squad statistics ==
As of match played 10 November 2019

=== Appearances and goals ===
No.	Pos	Nat	Player	Total		Premier League		Kazakhstan Cup	
No.	Pos	Nat	Player	Apps	Goals	Apps	Goals	Apps	Goals
3	DF	(Ukraine) UKR	Yevhen Tkachuk	25	2	24	2	0+1	0
5	DF	(Ukraine) UKR	Artem Baranovskyi	34	1	33	1	1	0
7	MF	(Kazakhstan) KAZ	Gevorg Najaryan	29	0	20+8	0	1	0
8	MF	(Kazakhstan) KAZ	Baūyrzhan Baytana	12	0	5+7	0	0	0
9	MF	(Croatia) CRO	Ivan Pešić	33	8	33	8	0	0
10	MF	(Kazakhstan) KAZ	Yerkebulan Nurgaliyev	28	4	22+6	4	0	0
11	FW	(Estonia) EST	Sergei Zenjov	30	8	29+1	8	0	0
13	DF	(Kazakhstan) KAZ	Stanislav Lunin	4	0	3+1	0	0	0
17	FW	(Kazakhstan) KAZ	Oralkhan Omirtayev	21	2	6+14	2	1	0
18	MF	(Uganda) UGA	Luwagga Kizito	24	5	17+7	5	0	0
19	DF	(Kazakhstan) KAZ	Yevgeny Tarasov	10	0	2+7	0	1	0
21	MF	(Kazakhstan) KAZ	Dmitry Bachek	7	0	0+6	0	0+1	0
22	MF	(Kazakhstan) KAZ	Marat Shakhmetov	27	2	27	2	0	0
23	DF	(Kazakhstan) KAZ	Birzhan Kulbekov	1	0	0	0	1	0
25	MF	(Serbia) SRB	Miloš Vidović	13	0	10+3	0	0	0
29	DF	(Kazakhstan) KAZ	Niyaz Shugayev	17	0	7+9	0	1	0
30	GK	(Kazakhstan) KAZ	Igor Shatskiy	33	0	33	0	0	0
40	GK	(Kazakhstan) KAZ	Yegor Tsuprikov	1	0	0	0	1	0
55	DF	(Kazakhstan) KAZ	Ruslan Alimbayev	3	0	2	0	1	0
60	FW	(Kazakhstan) KAZ	Sergey Vetrov	2	0	0+2	0	0	0
70	FW	(Kazakhstan) KAZ	Jean-Ali Payruz	30	1	16+13	1	1	0
72	MF	(Kazakhstan) KAZ	Sergei Skorykh	10	0	7+2	0	1	0
77	DF	(Kazakhstan) KAZ	Berik Shaikhov	15	0	15	0	0	0
84	DF	(Kazakhstan) KAZ	Anton Chichulin	11	0	7+4	0	0	0
88	MF	(Kosovo) KOS	Donjet Shkodra	29	4	28	4	0+1	0
99	FW	(Mozambique) MOZ	Reginaldo	14	3	8+6	3	0	0
Players away from Shakhter Karagandy on loan:
Players who left Shakhter Karagandy during the season:
6	MF	(Czech Republic) CZE	Lukáš Droppa	11	0	9+1	0	1	0

=== Goal scorers ===
Place	Position	Nation	Number	Name	Premier League	Kazakhstan Cup	Total
1	MF	(Croatia)	9	Ivan Pešić	8	0	8
1	FW	(Estonia)	11	Sergei Zenjov	8	0	8
3	MF	(Uganda)	18	Luwagga Kizito	5	0	5
4	MF	(Kosovo)	88	Donjet Shkodra	4	0	4
4	MF	(Kazakhstan)	10	Yerkebulan Nurgaliyev	4	0	4
6	FW	(Mozambique)	99	Reginaldo	3	0	3
7	MF	(Kazakhstan)	22	Marat Shakhmetov	2	0	2
7	FW	(Kazakhstan)	17	Oralkhan Omirtayev	2	0	2
7	DF	(Ukraine)	3	Yevhen Tkachuk	2	0	2
10	DF	(Ukraine)	5	Artem Baranovskyi	1	0	1
10	FW	(Kazakhstan)	70	Jean-Ali Payruz	1	0	1
				TOTALS	40	0	40

=== Disciplinary record ===
Number	Nation	Position	Name	Premier League		Kazakhstan Cup		Total	
Number	Nation	Position	Name	Yellow card	Red card	Yellow card	Red card	Yellow card	Red card
3	(Ukraine)	DF	Yevhen Tkachuk	7	0	1	0	8	0
5	(Ukraine)	DF	Artem Baranovskyi	3	0	0	0	3	0
7	(Kazakhstan)	MF	Gevorg Najaryan	8	0	1	0	9	0
8	(Kazakhstan)	MF	Baūyrzhan Baytana	3	0	0	0	3	0
10	(Kazakhstan)	MF	Yerkebulan Nurgaliyev	5	0	0	0	5	0
11	(Estonia)	FW	Sergei Zenjov	4	0	0	0	4	0
17	(Kazakhstan)	FW	Oralkhan Omirtayev	2	0	0	0	2	0
18	(Uganda)	MF	Luwagga Kizito	7	0	0	0	7	0
19	(Kazakhstan)	DF	Yevgeny Tarasov	0	0	1	0	1	0
22	(Kazakhstan)	MF	Marat Shakhmetov	8	1	0	0	8	1
25	(Serbia)	MF	Miloš Vidović	1	1	0	0	1	1
29	(Kazakhstan)	DF	Niyaz Shugayev	3	1	0	0	3	1
30	(Kazakhstan)	GK	Igor Shatskiy	3	0	0	0	3	0
70	(Kazakhstan)	FW	Jean-Ali Payruz	5	0	0	0	5	0
72	(Kazakhstan)	MF	Sergei Skorykh	0	0	1	0	1	0
77	(Kazakhstan)	DF	Berik Shaikhov	2	0	0	0	2	0
84	(Kazakhstan)	DF	Anton Chichulin	4	0	0	0	34	0
88	(Kosovo)	MF	Donjet Shkodra	5	1	0	0	5	1
99	(Mozambique)	FW	Reginaldo	2	0	0	0	2	0
Players who left Shakhter Karagandy during the season:
6	(Czech Republic)	MF	Lukáš Droppa	0	0	1	0	1	0
			TOTALS	72	4	5	0	77	4
