= 2021 FC Tobol season =

FC Tobol
2021 season
- Chairman: Nikolay Panin
- Manager: Grigori Babayan (until 17 June); Alexander Moskalenko (Caretaker) (from 18 June)
- Stadium: Central Stadium
- Premier League: 1st
- Kazakhstan Cup: Semifinal vs Shakhter Karagandy
- Super Cup: Winners
- Europa Conference League: Third Qualifying Round vs Žilina
- Top goalscorer: League: Nemanja Nikolić (8); All: Igor Sergeyev (9)
- Highest home attendance: 3,000 vs Zhetysu (19 June 2021)
- Lowest home attendance: 0 vs Taraz (2 May 2021) 0 vs Atyrau (16 July 2021) 0 vs Žilina (5 August 2021)
- Average home league attendance: 988 (21 November 2021)
Home colours	Away colours	Third colours

The 2021 FC Tobol season was the 23rd successive season that the club played in the Kazakhstan Premier League, the highest tier of association football in Kazakhstan. Tobol finished the season as Champions, reached the semifinals of the Kazakhstan Cup, won the Super Cup and were knocked out of the Europa Conference League at Third Qualifying Round by Žilina.

== Season events ==
On 18 February, Tobol announced the signing of Yegor Tsuprikov from Shakhter Karagandy, Askhat Tagybergen and Elguja Lobjanidze from Kaisar, and Toni Silva from Taraz. Also on 18 February, Serhiy Malyi signed a new contract with the club until the end of the 2021 season.

On 1 March, Tobol announced that they had signed Dušan Jovančić on loan from Çaykur Rizespor.

On 28 March, Tobol announced the signing of Nemanja Nikolić on a free transfer after he'd left Al Raed.

On 16 April, Tobol announced the signing of Zoran Tošić on a free transfer after he'd left Taizhou Yuanda.

On 17 June, Grigori Babayan left Tobol by mutual consent and was appointed by CSKA Moscow as a member of their coaching staff. The following day, Tobol confirmed Alexander Moskalenko as Acting Head Coach.

On 29 June, Oralkhan Omirtayev left Tobol after his contract was ended by mutual agreement.

On 1 July, Tobol announced the signing of Bagdat Kairov from Ordabasy, with Rúben Brígido also joining from Ordabasy the following day, and Carlos Fonseca leaving the club after his contract expired.

On 7 July, Tobol announced the return of Dušan Jovančić on an 18-month contract from Çaykur Rizespor, after his previous loan deal had ended at the end of June.

On 19 July, Tobol announced the signing of Igor Sergeev from Aktobe, after his previous loan deal had ended at the end of June.

On 30 July, Tobol Nemanja Nikolić left Tobol by mutual consent.

== Squad ==
As of match played 21 November 2021

No.	Name	Nationality	Position	Date of birth (age)	Signed from	Signed in	Contract ends	Apps.	Goals
Goalkeepers
12	Sultan Busurmanov	(Kazakhstan)	GK	10 May 1996 (aged 25)	Academy	2015		19	0
27	Vladimir Shpakovsky	(Kazakhstan)	GK	1 January 2001 (aged 20)	Academy	2021		1	0
35	Aleksandr Mokin	(Kazakhstan)	GK	19 June 1981 (aged 40)	Atyrau	2020		46	0
41	Yegor Tsuprikov	(Kazakhstan)	GK	27 May 1997 (aged 24)	Shakhter Karagandy	2021	2021	1	0
Defenders
3	Roman Asrankulov	(Kazakhstan)	DF	30 July 1999 (aged 22)	Academy	2018		22	3
7	Dmitri Miroshnichenko	(Kazakhstan)	DF	26 February 1992 (aged 29)	Aktobe	2016		155	6
17	Ruslan Valiullin	(Kazakhstan)	DF	9 September 1994 (aged 27)	Aktobe	2019		75	5
21	Sultan Abilgazy	(Kazakhstan)	DF	22 February 1997 (aged 24)	Okzhetpes	2018		52	3
22	Aleksandr Marochkin	(Kazakhstan)	DF	14 February 1990 (aged 31)	Kaisar	2020		38	1
24	Bagdat Kairov	(Kazakhstan)	DF	27 April 1993 (aged 28)	Ordabasy	2021		17	0
25	Serhiy Malyi	(Kazakhstan)	DF	5 June 1990 (aged 31)	Astana	2020	2021	62	9
32	Dmitriy Panov	(Kazakhstan)	DF	7 December 2001 (aged 19)	Academy	2021		1	0
33	Ilyas Almukhamedov	(Kazakhstan)	DF	1 February 2000 (aged 21)	Academy	2021		3	0
36	Aleksandr Krytsa	(Kazakhstan)	DF	15 August 2002 (aged 19)	Academy	2021		1	0
37	Arman Tungushbaev	(Kazakhstan)	DF	6 December 2001 (aged 19)	Academy	2021		1	0
39	Bekzat Ermekbaev	(Kazakhstan)	DF	6 December 2001 (aged 19)	Academy	2021		1	0
45	Aleksa Amanović	(North Macedonia)	DF	24 October 1996 (aged 25)	Javor Ivanjica	2020	2021	55	3
48	Marat Alpispaev	(Kazakhstan)	DF	8 April 2002 (aged 19)	Academy	2021		3	0
49	Andrey Drobyshev	(Kazakhstan)	DF	3 May 2000 (aged 21)	Academy	2021		1	0
Midfielders
5	Daniyar Semchenkov	(Kazakhstan)	MF	12 February 1997 (aged 24)	Academy	2019		12	0
8	Askhat Tagybergen	(Kazakhstan)	MF	9 August 1990 (aged 31)	Kaisar	2021		33	8
10	Serikzhan Muzhikov	(Kazakhstan)	MF	17 June 1989 (aged 32)	Astana	2020		42	5
11	Jérémy Manzorro	(France)	MF	11 November 1991 (aged 30)	Shakhter Karagandy	2020		44	7
13	Azat Nurgaliev	(Kazakhstan)	MF	30 June 1986 (aged 35)	Ordabasy	2018		271	54
14	Samat Zharynbetov	(Kazakhstan)	MF	4 January 1994 (aged 27)	Ekibastuz	2017		96	4
15	Toni Silva	(Guinea-Bissau)	MF	15 September 1993 (aged 28)	Taraz	2021		33	2
18	Rúben Brígido	(Portugal)	MF	23 June 1991 (aged 30)	Ordabasy	2021		18	0
20	Zhaslan Zhumashev	(Kazakhstan)	MF	27 September 2001 (aged 20)	Academy	2020		7	2
29	Dušan Jovančić	(Serbia)	MF	19 October 1990 (aged 31)	Çaykur Rizespor	2021	2022	29	1
34	Alsaid Akhmetzhanov	(Kazakhstan)	MF	9 August 2000 (aged 21)	Academy	2021		1	0
38	Rakhat Kabdullov	(Kazakhstan)	MF	20 February 2000 (aged 21)	Academy	2021		2	0
46	Ali Abdibek	(Kazakhstan)	MF	23 June 2003 (aged 18)	Academy	2021		1	0
47	Vyacheslav Kulpeisov	(Kazakhstan)	MF	24 December 2001 (aged 19)	Academy	2021		6	0
50	Bekzat Zhaparov	(Kazakhstan)	MF	5 March 2002 (aged 19)	Academy	2021		2	0
52	Nurbek Bayzhanov	(Kazakhstan)	MF	4 April 2003 (aged 18)	Academy	2021		1	0
87	Zoran Tošić	(Serbia)	MF	28 April 1987 (aged 34)	Taizhou Yuanda	2021	2021	16	5
Forwards
30	Farid Shaymerdenov	(Kazakhstan)	FW	15 January 2000 (aged 21)	Academy	2021		1	0
55	Ali Akhmet	(Kazakhstan)	FW	13 February 2003 (aged 18)	Academy	2021		3	0
77	Igor Sergeev	(Uzbekistan)	FW	30 April 1993 (aged 28)	Aktobe	2021		18	9
99	Elguja Lobjanidze	(Georgia (country))	FW	17 September 1992 (aged 29)	Kaisar	2021		28	4
Players away on loan
	Artem Sherstov	(Kazakhstan)	MF	16 October 1998 (aged 23)	Academy	2019		15	1
Left during the season
19	Oralkhan Omirtayev	(Kazakhstan)	FW	16 July 1998 (aged 23)	Shakhter Karagandy	2020		19	2
23	Nemanja Nikolić	(Serbia)	FW	19 October 1992 (aged 29)	Al Raed	2021	2021	19	8
40	Carlos Fonseca	(Portugal)	MF	23 August 1987 (aged 34)	Irtysh Pavlodar	2020		24	0

=== On loan ===
Note: Flags indicate national team as defined under FIFA eligibility rules; some limited exceptions apply. Players may hold more than one non-FIFA nationality.

No. / Pos. / Nation / Player; — / MF / KAZ / Artem Sherstov (at SDYUSSHOR No. 8)	No. / Pos. / Nation / Player

== Transfers ==
=== In ===
Date	Position	Nationality	Name	From	Fee	Ref.
18 February 2021	GK	(Kazakhstan)	Yegor Tsuprikov	Shakhter Karagandy	Undisclosed	
18 February 2021	MF	(Kazakhstan)	Askhat Tagybergen	Kaisar	Undisclosed	
18 February 2021	FW	(Georgia (country))	Elguja Lobjanidze	Kaisar	Undisclosed	
18 February 2021	FW	(Guinea-Bissau)	Toni Silva	Taraz	Undisclosed	
28 March 2021	FW	(Serbia)	Nemanja Nikolić	Al Raed	Free	
16 April 2021	MF	(Serbia)	Zoran Tošić	Taizhou Yuanda	Free	
1 July 2021	DF	(Kazakhstan)	Bagdat Kairov	Ordabasy	Free	
2 July 2021	MF	(Portugal)	Rúben Brígido	Ordabasy	Undisclosed	
7 July 2021	MF	(Serbia)	Dušan Jovančić	Çaykur Rizespor	Undisclosed	
19 July 2021	FW	(Uzbekistan)	Igor Sergeev	Aktobe	Undisclosed	

=== Loans in ===
Date from	Position	Nationality	Name	From	Date to	Ref.
1 March 2021	MF	(Serbia)	Dušan Jovančić	Çaykur Rizespor	Undisclosed	

=== Released ===
Date	Position	Nationality	Name	Joined	Date	Ref.
13 January 2020	FW	(Ivory Coast)	Senin Sebai	Khimki	15 January 2021	
16 January 2020	MF	(Georgia (country))	Jaba Kankava	Valenciennes	16 January 2021	
19 January 2020	MF	(Armenia)	Petros Avetisyan	Noah	27 February 2021	
19 January 2020	FW	(Kazakhstan)	Roman Murtazayev	Astana	23 February 2021	
20 January 2021	MF	(Georgia (country))	Nika Kvekveskiri	Lech Poznań	29 January 2021	
19 February 2021	DF	(Kazakhstan)	Temirlan Yerlanov	Ordabasy	28 February 2021	
29 June 2021	FW	(Kazakhstan)	Oralkhan Omirtayev	Shakhter Karagandy	5 July 2021	
2 July 2021	MF	(Portugal)	Carlos Fonseca	Kyzylzhar	12 July 2021	
30 July 2021	FW	(Serbia)	Nemanja Nikolić	Spartak Subotica		
23 December 2021	GK	(Kazakhstan)	Yegor Tsuprikov	Shakhter Karagandy		
31 December 2021	DF	(Kazakhstan)	Sultan Abilgazy	Turan		
31 December 2021	DF	(Kazakhstan)	Ruslan Valiullin	Banned		
31 December 2021	MF	(France)	Jérémy Manzorro	Astana	16 February 2022	
31 December 2021	MF	(Guinea-Bissau)	Toni Silva	Turan	14 March 2022	
31 December 2021	FW	(Georgia (country))	Elguja Lobjanidze	Dinamo Batumi		

== Friendlies ==
February 2021	RFS (Latvia)	0 – 0	(Kazakhstan) Tobol	Belek, Turkey
20:00 (UTC+6)		Report

20 February 2021	Orenburg (Russia)	0 – 1	(Kazakhstan) Tobol	Belek, Turkey
20:00 (UTC+6)		Report	Nurgaliev 13'

17 February 2021	Dila Gori (Georgia (country))	2 – 0	(Kazakhstan) Tobol	Belek, Turkey
20:00 (UTC+6)	Goal	Report

23 February 2021	Olimp-Dolgoprudny (Russia)	0 – 0	(Kazakhstan) Tobol	Belek, Turkey
20:00 (UTC+6)		Report

== Competitions ==
=== Overview ===
Competition	First match	Last match	Starting round	Final position	Record							
Competition	First match	Last match	Starting round	Final position	Pld	W	D	L	GF	GA	GD	Win %
Premier League	14 March 2021	30 October 2021	Matchday 1	1st	26	18	7	1	54	18	+36	69.23
Kazakhstan Cup	10 July 2021		Group stage		9	6	0	3	17	16	+1	66.67
Super Cup	3 March 2021	6 March 2021	Semifinal	Final	2	0	2	0	5	5	+0	0.00
Europa Conference League	22 July 2021	12 August 2021	Second Qualifying Round	Third Qualifying Round	4	1	0	3	4	9	−5	25.00
Total					41	25	9	7	80	48	+32	60.98

Last updated: 6 November 2021
Source: Competitions

=== Super Cup ===
3 March 2021 Semifinal	Tobol	3 – 3 (4 – 2 p)	Kairat	Turkistan
15:00 (UTC+6)	Malyi (yellow card) 19' (goal) 73'; Tagybergen 10'; Muzhikov 75'	Report	Alip (yellow card) 32' (yellow-red card) 90+5'; Kosović 40'; Mikanović (yellow card) 59'; A.Shushenachev 67'; Usenov (yellow card) 78'; Alykulov 90+1'	Stadium: Turkistan Arena; Attendance: 0 Referee: Igor Chesnokov
	Penalties
	Muzhikov (penalty scored); Jovančić (penalty scored); Tagybergen (penalty scored); Lobjanidze (penalty scored)		(penalty missed) Dugalić; (penalty scored) Kosović; (penalty scored) Abiken; (penalty missed) Hovhannisyan

6 March 2021 Final	Tobol	1 – 1 (5 – 4 p)	Astana	Turkistan
15:00 (UTC+6)	Malyi 15' (yellow card) 81'; Nurgaliev (yellow card) 77'; Abilgazy (yellow card) 89'	Report	S.Sovet (yellow card) 21'; Barseghyan (yellow card) 45+2'; S.Smajlagić (yellow card) 48'; Ciupercă (yellow card) 76'; Tomasov 90+1'	Stadium: Turkistan Arena; Attendance: 2,000; Referee: Denis Izmailov
	Penalties
	Muzhikov (penalty scored); Amanović (penalty scored); Tagybergen (penalty scored); Jovančić (penalty scored); Nurgaliev (penalty scored)		(penalty scored) Beisebekov; (penalty scored) Ciupercă; (penalty missed) Murtazayev; (penalty scored) Barseghyan; (penalty scored) Tomasov

=== Premier League ===
==== Results summary ====
Overall								Home						Away					
Pld	W	D	L	GF	GA	GD	Pts	W	D	L	GF	GA	GD	W	D	L	GF	GA	GD
26	18	7	1	54	18	+36	61	11	2	0	31	8	+23	7	5	1	23	10	+13

Last updated: 30 October 2021.
Source: See Results

==== Results by round ====
Round	1	2	3	4	5	6	7	8	9	10	11	12	13	14	15	16	17	18	19	20	21	22	23	24	25	26
Ground	H	A	H	A	H	A	H	A	H	H	A	H	A	H	A	H	A	H	A	H	A	A	H	A	H	A
Result	W	D	D	W	W	D	W	L	W	W	D	W	W	W	D	W	W	D	W	W	D	W	W	W	W	W
Position	2	3	4	4	4	4	2	4	2	2	2	2	2	2	2	2	1	1	1	1	2	2	2	2	1	1

Source: See Results
A = Away; H = Home; W = Win; D = Draw; L = Loss

==== Results ====
14 March 2021 1	Tobol	2 – 0	Akzhayik	Kostanay
17:00 (UTC+6)	Nurgaliev 30' (yellow card) 45'; Tagybergen 75'	Report	Takulov (yellow card) 7'; R.Khairov (yellow card) 74'; I.Antipov (yellow card) 84'	Stadium: Central Stadium; Attendance: 600; Referee: Sergey Gorokhovodatskiy

20 March 2021 2	Aktobe	1 – 1	Tobol	Aktobe
19:00 (UTC+6)	Pertsukh (yellow card) 19'; Sergeev 54'; A.Azhimov (yellow card) 58'; Manucharyan (yellow card) 72'	Report	Lobjanidze (yellow card) 2'; Valiullin (yellow card) 10' (goal) 71'; Nurgaliev (yellow card) 45'; Tagybergen (yellow card) 51'	Stadium: Central Stadium; Attendance: 0 Referee: Igor Chesnokov
Note: Match played behind closed doors due to the COVID-19 pandemic in Kazakhstan.

5 April 2021 3	Tobol	1 – 1	Astana	Kostanay
19:00 (UTC+6)	S.Zharynbetov (yellow card) 15'; Amanović (yellow card) 31'; Tomašević 31' (o.g.); Malyi (yellow card) 45+1'; Tagybergen (yellow card) 73'	Report	Rukavina (yellow card) 42'; Tomašević 83'	Stadium: Central Stadium; Attendance: 600; Referee: Denis Izmailov

10 April 2021 4	Zhetysu	0 – 2	Tobol	Taldıqorğan
15:00 (UTC+6)	A.Adil (yellow card) 57'; R.Aslan (yellow card) 76'	Report	Amanović 25'; S.Zharynbetov (yellow card) 33'; Jovančić (yellow card) 63'; Lobjanidze 74'; Muzhikov (yellow card) 85'	Stadium: Zhetysu Stadium; Attendance: 0 Referee: Alexander Gauser
Note: Match played behind closed doors due to the COVID-19 pandemic in Kazakhstan.

14 April 2021 5	Tobol	1 – 0	Kaisar	Kostanay
17:00 (UTC+6)	Silva 2'; Nurgaliev (yellow card) 82'	Report	Denković (yellow card) 19'; Bitang (yellow card) 26' (yellow-red card) 73'	Stadium: Central Stadium; Attendance: 600; Referee: Elzhas Altynbekov

19 April 2021 6	Kairat	2 – 2	Tobol	Almaty
19:00 (UTC+6)	Kanté 20', 68'; Hovhannisyan (yellow card) 25' (yellow-red card) 80'	Report	Nurgaliev 3'; S.Zharynbetov (yellow card) 54'; Valiullin (yellow card) 63'; Nikolić 70'; Tagybergen (yellow card) 72'	Stadium: Central Stadium; Attendance: 0 Referee: Igor Chesnokov
Note: Match played behind closed doors due to the COVID-19 pandemic in Kazakhstan.

23 April 2021 7	Tobol	5 – 0	Turan	Kostanay
19:00 (UTC+6)	Nikolić 8', 63'; Nurgaliev 44' (pen.); Miroshnichenko 76'; Z.Zhumashev 84'	Report	T.Amirov (yellow card) 13'	Stadium: Central Stadium; Attendance: 600; Referee: Sergey Gorokhovodatsky

28 April 2021 8	Caspiy	2 – 1	Tobol	Aktau
15:00 (UTC+6)	Darabayev (yellow card) 4'; Karayev 31'; Cuckić 72'	Report	Silva (yellow card) 24'; Valiullin (yellow card) 50'; Omirtayev 90+4'	Stadium: Zhastar Stadium; Attendance: 0 Referee: Grigory Moskovchenko
Note: Match played behind closed doors due to the COVID-19 pandemic in Kazakhstan.

2 May 2021 9	Tobol	3 – 0	Taraz	Kostanay
19:00 (UTC+6)	Nikolić 30', 42'; S.Zharynbetov (yellow card) 39'; Valiullin 82'; Omirtayev (yellow card) 90+2'	Report	Z.Zhaksylykov (yellow card) 25'	Stadium: Central Stadium; Attendance: 0 Referee: Denis Izmaylov
Note: Match played behind closed doors due to the COVID-19 pandemic in Kazakhstan.

9 May 2021 10	Tobol	2 – 0	Atyrau	Kostanay
18:00 (UTC+6)	Amanović (yellow card) 70'; Muzhikov 80'; Manzorro 90+3'	Report	Gian (yellow card) 33'; Alex Bruno (yellow card) 56'; Ayrapetyan (yellow card) 83'	Stadium: Central Stadium; Attendance: 600; Referee: Alexander Gauzer

15 May 2021 11	Ordabasy	1 – 1	Tobol	Shymkent
17:00 (UTC+6)	Yerlanov (yellow card) 36'; Dosmagambetov (yellow card) 42'; Kleshchenko (red card) 80'; Tungyshbayev 87'	Report	Nurgaliev (yellow card) 40'; Malyi (yellow card) 49'; Jovančić (yellow card) 54'; Tagybergen (yellow card) 62'; S.Zharynbetov 67'	Stadium: Kazhymukan Munaitpasov Stadium; Attendance: 0 Referee: Igor Chesnokov
Note: Match played behind closed doors due to the COVID-19 pandemic in Kazakhstan.

19 May 2021 12	Tobol	2 – 0	Kyzylzhar	Kostanay
20:00 (UTC+6)	Nikolić 62'; Muzhikov 77' (pen.)	Report	Danilo (yellow card) 51'; N.Dairov (yellow card) 73'; Lobantsev (red card) 75'	Stadium: Central Stadium; Attendance: 600; Referee: Bolat Karlibaev

24 May 2021 13	Shakhter Karagandy	0 – 3	Tobol	Nur-Sultan
20:00 (UTC+6)	Y.Kybyray (yellow card) 27'; D.Atanaskoski (yellow card) 38'; M.Gabyshev (yellow card) 65'; Balashov (yellow card) 84'	Report	Tagybergen 30', 57' (pen.); Muzhikov (yellow card) 39'; S.Zharynbetov (yellow card) 59'; Lobjanidze 81'	Stadium: Astana Arena; Attendance: 200; Referee: Aidyn Rakhimbaev

29 May 2021 14	Tobol	2 – 1	Aktobe	Kostanay
20:00 (UTC+6)	Nurgaliev 17' (pen.); Miroshnichenko 29'; Nikolić (yellow card) 65'; Manzorro (yellow card) 75'	Report	Samorodov (yellow card) 40'; Totadze (yellow card) 43'; Dubajić 87'	Stadium: Central Stadium; Attendance: 900; Referee: Saken Bayimbet

13 June 2021 15	Astana	1 – 1	Tobol	Nur-Sultan
19:00 (UTC+6)	Tomasov 44' (pen.); Rukavina (yellow card) 64'; Ciupercă (yellow card) 71'	Report	Amanović (yellow card) 22'; Nikolić 29' (yellow card) 62'; Manzorro (yellow card) 73'	Stadium: Astana Arena; Attendance: 3,200; Referee: Bulat Sariev

19 June 2021 16	Tobol	2 – 1	Zhetysu	Kostanay
19:00 (UTC+6)	Nikolić 36' (pen.); Nurgaliyev 48' (pen.); Amanović (yellow card) 62'; Silva (yellow card) 67'; Valiullin (yellow card) 82'	Report	A.Adil 19'; A.Adakhadzhiev (yellow card) 38'; Ablitarov (yellow card) 44'; M.Golubnichy (yellow card) 47'; N.Nurbergen (yellow card) 66'	Stadium: Central Stadium; Attendance: 3,000; Referee: Grigory Moskovchenko

23 June 2021 17	Kaisar	1 – 3	Tobol	Kyzylorda
21:00 (UTC+6)	Čađenović 27'	Report	Malyi 13'; Manzorro (yellow card) 52'; Miroshnichenko 63'; R.Asrankulov 74'	Stadium: Gani Muratbayev Stadium; Attendance: 1,400; Referee: Sergey Gorokhovodatsky

28 June 2021 18	Tobol	2 – 2	Kairat	Kostanay
19:00 (UTC+6)	Tagybergen (yellow card) 17'; Valiullin 53' (yellow card) 59'; Dugalić 66' (o.g.); Muzhikov (red card) 73'	Report	A.Shushenachev 23'; Abiken (yellow card) 52'; Kosović (yellow card) 54'; Kanté (yellow card) 75'; Vágner Love 76'	Stadium: Central Stadium; Attendance: 3,500; Referee: Artem Kuchin

3 July 2021 19	Turan	2 – 4	Tobol	Turkistan
21:00 (UTC+6)	T.Amirov 16' (yellow card) 27'; Kerimzhanov (yellow card) 63'; A.Abbas (yellow card) 68'; Malyi 76' (o.g.)	Report	Kerimzhanov 33' (o.g.); Nurgaliev 56' (pen.); Malyi 84'; Lobjanidze 87'	Stadium: Turkistan Arena; Attendance: 1,100; Referee: Denis Izmailov

12 September 2021 20	Tobol	2 – 1	Caspiy	Kostanay
20:00 (UTC+6)	Malyi 15'; Jovančić (yellow card) 43'; Brígido (red card) 68'; Amanović 77'; Zharynbetov (yellow card) 85'	Report	Karimov 40'; Darabayev (yellow card) 41'; Gavrić (yellow card) 45+1'; Stanojević (yellow card) 90'	Stadium: Central Stadium; Attendance: 700; Referee: Bulat Sariev

19 September 2021 21	Taraz	0 – 0	Tobol	Taraz
17:00 (UTC+6)	Malyi (yellow card) 40'; Tagybergen (yellow card) 75'; Jovančić (yellow card) 86'	Report	Kódjo (yellow card) 26'; Adamović (yellow card) 65'; Dosmagambetov (yellow card) 73'; A.Taubay (yellow card) 77'; Seysen (yellow card) 90+3'	Stadium: Central Stadium; Attendance: 2,000; Referee: Igor Chesnokov

27 September 2021 22	Atyrau	0 – 1	Tobol	Atyrau
18:00 (UTC+6)	Alex Bruno (yellow card) 34'; Gian (yellow card) 39'; Udo (yellow card) 63'	Report	Amanović 18'; B.Kairov (yellow card) 90+3'	Stadium: Munaishy Stadium; Attendance: 300; Referee: Sergei Nozhenko

2 October 2021 23	Tobol	3 – 1	Ordabasy	Kostanay
17:00 (UTC+6)	Jovančić (yellow card) 6'; Sergeyev 25'; Nurgaliyev (yellow card) 52'; Tošić 74'; R.Asrankulov 86'	Report	S.Astanov 30'; S.Tursynbay (yellow card) 31'; S.Shamshi (yellow card) 62'; Kleshchenko (yellow card) 77'	Stadium: Central Stadium; Attendance: 1,000; Referee: Denis Izmailov

17 October 2021 24	Kyzylzhar	0 – 2	Tobol	Petropavl
15:00 (UTC+6)	Smajlagić (yellow card) 19'; Fonseca (yellow card) 45+2'	Report	B.Kairov (yellow card) 19'; Lobantsev 33' (o.g.); Manzorro 77'	Stadium: Karasai Stadium; Attendance: 1,500; Referee: Sultan Abilgazy

24 October 2021 25	Tobol	4 – 1	Shakhter Karagandy	Kostanay
15:00 (UTC+6)	Marochkin 16'; Sergeyev 31'; Nurgaliyev 56'; Lobjanidze 83'; Z.Zhumashev (yellow card) 90+5'	Report	T.Nurseitov (yellow card) 22'; A.Altynkhan (yellow card) 53'; A.Giorgiadi 86'	Stadium: Central Stadium; Attendance: 1,500; Referee: Daniyar Sakhi

30 October 2021 26	Akzhayik	0 – 2	Tobol	Oral
16:00 (UTC+6)	B.Omarov (yellow card) 28'; Tapalov (yellow card) 62'	Report	Sergeyev 27'; Brígido (yellow card) 38'; Tagybergen 60'; Malyi (yellow card) 70'	Stadium: Petr Atoyan Stadium; Attendance: 2,000; Referee: Alexander Zatula

==== League table ====
Pos	Team	Pld	W	D	L	GF	GA	GD	Pts	Qualification or relegation
1	Tobol (C)	26	18	7	1	54	18	+36	61	Qualification for the Champions League first qualifying round
2	Astana	26	17	6	3	53	25	+28	57	Qualification for the Europa Conference League second qualifying round
3	Kairat	26	14	9	3	52	21	+31	51	Qualification for the Europa Conference League second qualifying round
4	Kyzylzhar	26	11	6	9	32	24	+8	39	Qualification for the Europa Conference League second qualifying round
5	Ordabasy	26	10	8	8	36	35	+1	38	

Source: UEFA, Soccerway
Rules for classification: 1) Points; 2) Goal difference; 3) Matches won; 4) Goals scored; 5) Away goals scored; 6) Head-to-head points; 7) Head-to-head matches won; 8) Head-to-head goal difference; 9) Head-to-head goals scored; 10) Head-to-head away goals scored; 11) Draw.
(C) Champions

=== Kazakhstan Cup ===
==== Group stage ====
Pos	Team	Pld	W	D	L	GF	GA	GD	Pts	Qualification
1	Tobol (A)	6	4	0	2	13	11	+2	12	Advanced to Quarterfinals
2	Taraz (A)	6	3	1	2	8	8	0	10	Advanced to Quarterfinals
3	Makhtaaral	6	2	3	1	13	9	+4	9	
4	Atyrau	6	0	2	4	5	11	−6	2	

Updated to match(es) played on 15 August 2021. Source: PFLK
(A) Advance to a further round

10 July 2021 1	Taraz	1 – 3	Tobol	Taraz
20:00 (UTC+6)	B.Aitbayev 14'; Baytana (yellow card) 67'; A.Zhumabek (yellow card) 90+4'	Report	Tošić 5', 32'; B.Kairov (yellow card) 78'; Jovančić (yellow card) 86'; Tagybergen 90+1'	Stadium: Central Stadium; Attendance: 2,500; Referee: Igor Chesnokov

16 July 2021 2	Tobol	2 – 0	Atyrau	Kostanay
21:00 (UTC+6)	Silva 42'; Tošić 90+1'	Report	Kuanysh Kalmuratov (yellow card) 24'; Dmitrenko (yellow card) 57' (yellow-red card) 69'; Medved (yellow card) 72'	Stadium: Central Stadium; Attendance: 0 Referee: Rustam Omarov

25 July 2021 3	Tobol	3 – 4	Makhtaaral	Kostanay
21:00 (UTC+6)	Muzhikov 30'; Z.Zhumashev (penalty missed) 68' 68' (yellow card) 78'; D.Aripov 83' (o.g.)	Report	V.Sedelnikov 8'; E.Oralbai 11' (yellow card) 34'; R.Liuhai 17'; E.Serik (yellow card) 64'; E.Levin (yellow card) 67'; M.Hasein 90+1' (o.g.)	Stadium: Central Stadium; Attendance: 800; Referee: Galymzhan Kenzhalinov

1 August 2021 4	Makhtaaral	4 – 0	Tobol	Atakent
18:00 (UTC+6)	M.Khasein (yellow card) 29'; D.Koné 31'; E.Oralbai (yellow card) 45+2' (goal) 87'; B.Ryskul (yellow card) 47'; E.Levin 51'; S.Duiseshov 90+1'	Report	B.Zhaparov (yellow card) 20'; R.Kabdullov (yellow card) 34'; V.Kulpeisov (yellow card) 90'	Stadium: Alpamys Batyr Stadium; Attendance: 0 Referee: Denis Izmailov
Note: Match played behind closed doors due to the COVID-19 pandemic in Kazakhstan.

8 August 2021 5	Tobol	2 – 1	Taraz	Kostanay
19:00 (UTC+6)	Nurgaliyev (yellow card) 24'; S.Zharynbetov (yellow card) 42'; Manzorro (yellow card) 50'; Sergeyev 69'; Abilgazy (yellow card) 68' (goal) 90+3'	Report	Baytana 44'; Kódjo (yellow card) 53'; A.Taubay (yellow card) 86'	Stadium: Central Stadium; Attendance: 1,600; Referee: Aidyn Rakhimbaev

14 August 2021 6	Atyrau	1 – 3	Tobol	Atyrau
18:00 (UTC+6)	Allef 8'; Dashyan (yellow card) 17'; Udo (red card) 31'; Alex Bruno (yellow card) 32'; Stojković (yellow card) 52'; Medved (yellow card) 63'	Report	Sergeyev 58'; Muzhikov (yellow card) 62'; Manzorro 75'; Tošić 86'	Stadium: Munaishy Stadium; Attendance: 0 Referee: Daniyar Kurbanov

==== Knockout stages ====
21 August 2021 Quarterfinal 1st leg	Kyzylzhar	0 – 1	Tobol	Petropavl
17:00 (UTC+6)	Fonseca (yellow card) 16' (yellow-red card) 65'; A.Kasym (yellow card) 28'; D.Shmidt (yellow card) 44'; Murachyov (yellow card) 62'	Report	Sergeyev 36'; Marochkin (yellow card) 49'	Stadium: Karasai Stadium; Attendance: 1,600; Referee: Aidyn Rakhimbaev

22 September 2021 Quarterfinal 2nd leg	Tobol	1 – 0 (2 – 0 agg.)	Kyzylzhar	Kostanay
20:00 (UTC+6)	R.Asrankulov 61'	Report	A.Saparov (yellow card) 23'; Murachyov (yellow card) 63'; Podio (yellow card) 89'	Stadium: Central Stadium; Attendance: 500; Referee: Grigory Moskovchenko

6 November 2021 Semifinal 1st leg	Shakhter Karagandy	5 – 2	Tobol	Nur-Sultan
15:00 (UTC+6)	Umayev 8', 45+1'; D.Atanaskoski 14'; Mawutor 48'; Bukorac (yellow card) 83'; Tattybayev 88'; Shikavka (yellow card) 90'	Report	Tagybergen 45'; Jovančić (yellow card) 45+3'; Sergeyev 58'; Zharynbetov (yellow card) 73'; Z.Zhumashev (yellow card) 85'; Malyi (yellow card) 86'	Stadium: Astana Arena; Attendance: 600; Referee: Igor Chesnokov
Note: Match played at the Astana Arena in Nur-Sultan, instead of Shakhter Karagandy's regular Shakhter Stadium in Karaganda.

21 November 2021 Semifinal 2nd leg	Tobol	0 – 2 (2 – 7 agg.)	Shakhter Karagandy	Kostanay
16:00 (UTC+6)	Manzorro (yellow card) 63'	Report	Nazarenko 35'; Toshev 39'	Stadium: Central Stadium; Attendance: 650; Referee: Daniyar Sakhi

=== UEFA Europa Conference League ===
==== Qualifying rounds ====
23 July 2021 Second Qualifying Round 1st leg	Hajduk Split (Croatia)	2 – 0	(Kazakhstan) Tobol	Split Croatia
01:00 (UTC+6)	Ljubičić 21', 53' (yellow card) 50'	Report	Amanović (yellow card) 39'; B.Kairov (yellow card) 43'	Stadium: Stadion Poljud; Attendance: 11,141; Referee: Christian Dingert (Germany)

29 July 2021 Second Qualifying Round 2nd leg	Tobol (Kazakhstan)	4 – 1 (a.e.t.) (4 – 3 agg.)	(Croatia) Hajduk Split	Kostanay, Kazakhstan
21:00 (UTC+6)	B.Kairov (yellow card) 31'; Jovančić (yellow card) 37' (goal) 56'; Sergeyev 61', 67'; Valiullin (yellow card) 81'; Tagybergen 118'	Report	Vušković (yellow card) 14'; Krovinović (penalty missed) 70'; Sahiti 90+4'; Simić (yellow card) 94'	Stadium: Central Stadium; Attendance: 2,000; Referee: Vladimir Moskalev (Russia)

5 August 2021 Third Qualifying Round 1st leg	Tobol (Kazakhstan)	0 – 1	(Slovakia) Žilina	Nur-Sultan, Kazakhstan
22:00 (UTC+6)	Amanović (yellow card) 58'; Silva (yellow card) 77'; Jovančić (yellow card) 90+2'	Report	Gono 27'	Stadium: Astana Arena; Attendance: 0 Referee: Sergei Ivanov (Russia)
Note: Match played at the Astana Arena in Nur-Sultan, instead of Tobol's regular Central Stadium in Kostanay, due to it not meeting UEFA requirements. Match played behind closed doors due to the COVID-19 pandemic in Kazakhstan.

12 August 2021 Third Qualifying Round 2nd leg	Žilina (Slovakia)	5 – 0 (6 – 0 agg.)	(Kazakhstan) Tobol	Žilina, Slovakia
22:45 (UTC+6)	Ďuriš 14'; Anang (yellow card) 16'; Rusnák 41'; Kaprálik (yellow card) 55'; Bichakhchyan 64', 90+1'; Slebodník 81'	Report	Valiullin (yellow card) 52'; Jovančić (yellow card) 77'; Malyi (yellow card) 90'	Stadium: Štadión pod Dubňom; Attendance: 2,227; Referee: John Beaton (Scotland)

== Squad statistics ==
As of match played 21 November 2021

=== Appearances and goals ===
No.	Pos	Nat	Player	Total		Premier League		Kazakhstan Cup		Super Cup		UEFA Europa Conference League	
No.	Pos	Nat	Player	Apps	Goals	Apps	Goals	Apps	Goals	Apps	Goals	Apps	Goals
3	DF	(Kazakhstan) KAZ	Roman Asrankulov	16	3	5+3	2	7	1	1	0	0	0
5	MF	(Kazakhstan) KAZ	Daniyar Semchenkov	7	0	1	0	3+3	0	0	0	0	0
7	DF	(Kazakhstan) KAZ	Dmitri Miroshnichenko	22	3	10+7	3	1+1	0	2	0	0+1	0
8	MF	(Kazakhstan) KAZ	Askhat Tagybergen	34	8	22+1	4	2+3	2	2	1	3+1	1
10	MF	(Kazakhstan) KAZ	Serikzhan Muzhikov	25	4	10+6	2	3+1	1	2	1	1+2	0
11	MF	(France) FRA	Jérémy Manzorro	29	3	15+5	2	5	1	2	0	0+2	0
12	GK	(Kazakhstan) KAZ	Sultan Busurmanov	6	0	0	0	6	0	0	0	0	0
13	MF	(Kazakhstan) KAZ	Azat Nurgaliev	34	7	17+8	7	4	0	1+1	0	1+2	0
14	MF	(Kazakhstan) KAZ	Samat Zharynbetov	35	1	21+3	1	6+1	0	0+1	0	1+2	0
15	MF	(Guinea-Bissau) GBS	Toni Silva	33	2	15+9	1	3+2	1	0+1	0	1+2	0
17	DF	(Kazakhstan) KAZ	Ruslan Valiullin	25	3	17	3	2	0	1+1	0	4	0
18	MF	(Portugal) POR	Rúben Brígido	19	0	3+3	0	4+5	0	0	0	3+1	0
20	MF	(Kazakhstan) KAZ	Zhaslan Zhumashev	6	2	0+3	1	2+1	1	0	0	0	0
21	DF	(Kazakhstan) KAZ	Sultan Abilgazy	15	1	3+5	0	7	1	0	0	0	0
22	DF	(Kazakhstan) KAZ	Aleksandr Marochkin	39	1	25	1	6+2	0	2	0	4	0
24	DF	(Kazakhstan) KAZ	Bagdat Kairov	18	0	7	0	6+1	0	0	0	4	0
25	DF	(Kazakhstan) KAZ	Serhiy Malyi	37	5	24+1	3	4+2	0	2	2	4	0
27	GK	(Kazakhstan) KAZ	Vladimir Shpakovsky	1	0	0	0	1	0	0	0	0	0
29	MF	(Serbia) SRB	Dušan Jovančić	30	1	12+5	0	4+3	0	0+2	0	3+1	1
30	FW	(Kazakhstan) KAZ	Farid Shaymerdenov	1	0	0	0	1	0	0	0	0	0
32	DF	(Kazakhstan) KAZ	Dmitriy Panov	1	0	0	0	1	0	0	0	0	0
33	DF	(Kazakhstan) KAZ	Ilyas Almukhamedov	3	0	0	0	2+1	0	0	0	0	0
34	MF	(Kazakhstan) KAZ	Alsaid Akhmetzhanov	1	0	0	0	1	0	0	0	0	0
35	GK	(Kazakhstan) KAZ	Aleksandr Mokin	34	0	26	0	2	0	2	0	4	0
36	DF	(Kazakhstan) KAZ	Aleksandr Krytsa	1	0	0	0	0+1	0	0	0	0	0
37	DF	(Kazakhstan) KAZ	Arman Tungushbaev	1	0	0	0	0+1	0	0	0	0	0
38	MF	(Kazakhstan) KAZ	Rakhat Kabdullov	2	0	0	0	1+1	0	0	0	0	0
39	DF	(Kazakhstan) KAZ	Bekzat Ermekbaev	1	0	0	0	1	0	0	0	0	0
41	GK	(Kazakhstan) KAZ	Yegor Tsuprikov	1	0	0	0	1	0	0	0	0	0
45	DF	(North Macedonia) MKD	Aleksa Amanović	38	3	24	3	6+2	0	2	0	4	0
46	MF	(Kazakhstan) KAZ	Ali Abdibek	1	0	0	0	0+1	0	0	0	0	0
47	MF	(Kazakhstan) KAZ	Vyacheslav Kulpeisov	6	0	0+2	0	3+1	0	0	0	0	0
48	DF	(Kazakhstan) KAZ	Marat Alpispaev	3	0	0	0	2+1	0	0	0	0	0
49	DF	(Kazakhstan) KAZ	Andrey Drobyshev	1	0	0	0	1	0	0	0	0	0
50	MF	(Kazakhstan) KAZ	Bekzat Zhaparov	2	0	0	0	1+1	0	0	0	0	0
52	MF	(Kazakhstan) KAZ	Nurbek Bayzhanov	1	0	0	0	0+1	0	0	0	0	0
55	FW	(Kazakhstan) KAZ	Ali Akhmet	3	0	0	0	0+3	0	0	0	0	0
77	FW	(Uzbekistan) UZB	Igor Sergeyev	18	9	6+1	3	5+2	4	0	0	3+1	2
87	MF	(Serbia) SRB	Zoran Tošić	17	5	2+6	1	2+3	4	0	0	3+1	0
99	FW	(Georgia (country)) GEO	Elguja Lobjanidze	29	4	8+14	4	2+2	0	1+1	0	0+1	0
Players away from Tobol on loan:
Players who left Tobol during the season:
19	FW	(Kazakhstan) KAZ	Oralkhan Omirtayev	6	1	0+4	1	0	0	1+1	0	0	0
23	FW	(Serbia) SRB	Nemanja Nikolić	19	8	12+5	8	1	0	0	0	1	0
40	MF	(Portugal) POR	Carlos Fonseca	12	0	1+10	0	0	0	0+1	0	0	0

=== Goal scorers ===
Place	Position	Nation	Number	Name	Premier League	Kazakhstan Cup	Super Cup	UEFA Europa Conference League	Total
1	FW	(Uzbekistan)	77	Igor Sergeyev	3	4	0	2	9
2	FW	(Serbia)	23	Nemanja Nikolić	8	0	0	0	8
2	MF	(Kazakhstan)	8	Askhat Tagybergen	4	2	1	1	8
4	MF	(Kazakhstan)	13	Azat Nurgaliev	7	0	0	0	7
5	MF	(Serbia)	87	Zoran Tošić	1	4	0	0	5
5				Own goal	4	1	0	0	5
7	FW	(Georgia (country))	99	Elguja Lobjanidze	4	0	0	0	4
7	MF	(Kazakhstan)	10	Serikzhan Muzhikov	2	1	1	0	4
9	DF	(Kazakhstan)	7	Dmitri Miroshnichenko	3	0	0	0	3
9	DF	(Kazakhstan)	17	Ruslan Valiullin	3	0	0	0	3
9	DF	(North Macedonia)	45	Aleksa Amanović	3	0	0	0	3
9	DF	(Kazakhstan)	3	Roman Asrankulov	2	1	0	0	3
9	MF	(France)	11	Jérémy Manzorro	2	1	0	0	3
9	DF	(Kazakhstan)	25	Serhiy Malyi	1	0	2	0	3
15	DF	(Kazakhstan)	25	Serhiy Malyi	2	0	0	0	2
15	MF	(Guinea-Bissau)	15	Toni Silva	1	1	0	0	2
15	MF	(Kazakhstan)	20	Zhaslan Zhumashev	1	1	0	0	2
18	FW	(Kazakhstan)	19	Oralkhan Omirtayev	1	0	0	0	1
18	MF	(Kazakhstan)	14	Samat Zharynbetov	1	0	0	0	1
18	DF	(Kazakhstan)	22	Aleksandr Marochkin	1	0	0	0	1
18	DF	(Kazakhstan)	21	Sultan Abilgazy	0	1	0	0	1
18	MF	(Serbia)	29	Dušan Jovančić	0	0	0	1	1
				TOTALS	54	17	4	4	79

=== Clean sheets ===
Place	Position	Nation	Number	Name	Premier League	Kazakhstan Cup	Super Cup	UEFA Europa Conference League	Total
1	GK	(Kazakhstan)	35	Aleksandr Mokin	12	2	0	0	14
2	GK	(Kazakhstan)	12	Sultan Busurmanov	0	1	0	0	1
				TOTALS	12	3	0	0	15

=== Disciplinary record ===
Number	Nation	Position	Name	Premier League		Kazakhstan Cup		Super Cup		UEFA Europa Conference League		Total	
Number	Nation	Position	Name	Booked	Sent off (straight red)	Booked	Sent off (straight red)	Booked	Sent off (straight red)	Booked	Sent off (straight red)	Booked	Sent off (straight red)
8	(Kazakhstan)	MF	Askhat Tagybergen	6	0	0	0	0	0	0	0	6	0
10	(Kazakhstan)	MF	Serikzhan Muzhikov	2	1	1	0	0	0	0	0	3	1
11	(France)	MF	Jérémy Manzorro	3	0	2	0	0	0	0	0	5	0
13	(Kazakhstan)	MF	Azat Nurgaliev	5	0	1	0	1	0	0	0	7	0
14	(Kazakhstan)	MF	Samat Zharynbetov	6	0	2	0	0	0	0	0	8	0
15	(Guinea-Bissau)	MF	Toni Silva	2	0	0	0	0	0	1	0	3	0
17	(Kazakhstan)	DF	Ruslan Valiullin	5	0	0	0	0	0	2	0	7	0
18	(Portugal)	MF	Rúben Brígido	3	1	0	0	0	0	0	0	3	1
20	(Kazakhstan)	MF	Zhaslan Zhumashev	1	0	2	0	0	0	0	0	3	0
21	(Kazakhstan)	DF	Sultan Abilgazy	0	0	1	0	1	0	0	0	2	0
22	(Kazakhstan)	DF	Aleksandr Marochkin	0	0	1	0	0	0	0	0	1	0
24	(Kazakhstan)	DF	Bagdat Kairov	2	0	1	0	0	0	2	0	5	0
25	(Kazakhstan)	DF	Serhiy Malyi	4	0	1	0	2	0	1	0	8	0
29	(Serbia)	MF	Dušan Jovančić	5	0	2	0	0	0	3	0	10	0
38	(Kazakhstan)	MF	Rakhat Kabdullov	0	0	1	0	0	0	0	0	1	0
45	(North Macedonia)	DF	Aleksa Amanović	4	0	0	0	0	0	2	0	6	0
47	(Kazakhstan)	MF	Vyacheslav Kulpeisov	0	0	1	0	0	0	0	0	1	0
50	(Kazakhstan)	MF	Bekzat Zhaparov	0	0	1	0	0	0	0	0	1	0
99	(Georgia (country))	FW	Elguja Lobjanidze	1	0	0	0	0	0	0	0	1	0
Players who left Tobol during the season:
19	(Kazakhstan)	FW	Oralkhan Omirtayev	1	0	0	0	0	0	0	0	1	0
23	(Serbia)	FW	Nemanja Nikolić	2	0	0	0	0	0	0	0	2	0
			TOTALS	52	2	16	0	4	0	12	0	84	2
