= 2018 FC Shakhter Karagandy season =

FC Shakhter Karagandy
2018 season
- Chairman: Sergei Yegorov
- Manager: Uladzimir Zhuravel (9 January-3 July); Andrei Finonchenko (Caretaker) (3 July-18 July); Nikolay Kostov (from 18 July)
- Stadium: Shakhter Stadium
- Premier League: 8th
- Kazakhstan Cup: Semifinal vs Atyrau
- Top goalscorer: League: Damir Kojašević (8); All: Damir Kojašević (9)
Home colours	Away colours

The 2018 FC Shakhter Karagandy season is the 27th successive season that the club will play in the Kazakhstan Premier League, the highest tier of association football in Kazakhstan. Shakhter will also participate in the Kazakhstan Cup.

== Season events ==
On 9 January 2018, Uladzimir Zhuravel was appointed as Shakhter Karagandy's new manager. On 3 July, Zhuravel left Shakhter Karagandy by mutual consent with Andrei Finonchenko being appointed as Caretaker Manager On 18 July, Nikolay Kostov was confirmed as Shakhter Karagandy's new manager.

== Squad ==
As of match played 11 November 2018

No.	Name	Nationality	Position	Date of birth (age)	Signed from	Signed in	Apps.	Goals
Goalkeepers
1	Abylaikhan Duysen	(Kazakhstan)	GK	3 June 1994 (age 31)	Astana	2018	8	0
30	Igor Shatskiy	(Kazakhstan)	GK	11 May 1989 (age 36)	Academy	2010	86	0
40	Yegor Tsuprikov	(Kazakhstan)	GK	27 May 1997 (age 28)	Bolat	2018	2	0
Defenders
3	Yevhen Tkachuk	(Ukraine)	DF	27 June 1991 (age 34)	Stal Kamianske	2018	28	1
4	Mikhail Gabyshev	(Kazakhstan)	DF	2 January 1990 (age 36)	Vostok	2012	122	6
5	Kirill Pasichnik	(Kazakhstan)	DF	24 May 1993 (age 32)	Buxoro	2018	5	0
6	Ilnur Mangutkin	(Kazakhstan)	DF	16 September 1986 (age 39)	Okzhetpes	2017	17	0
19	Yevgeny Tarasov	(Kazakhstan)	DF	16 April 1985 (aged 26)	Vostok	2009	191	8
20	Mateo Mužek	(Croatia)	DF	29 April 1995 (age 30)	Neftchi Baku	2018	32	0
23	Birzhan Kulbekov	(Kazakhstan)	DF	22 April 1994 (age 31)		2018	12	0
34	Igor Pikalkin	(Kazakhstan)	DF	19 March 1992 (age 33)	Astana	2016	88	2
55	Ruslan Alimbayev	(Kazakhstan)	DF	2 March 1997 (age 28)	Olé Brasil	2015	4	0
Midfielders
8	Alyaksandr Valadzko	(Belarus)	MF	8 June 1986 (age 39)	BATE Borisov	2018	27	1
10	Damir Kojašević	(Montenegro)	MF	3 June 1987 (age 38)	Vojvodina	2018	28	8
16	Sergei Mošnikov	(Estonia)	MF	7 January 1988 (age 38)	Górnik Łęczna	2018	9	0
18	Igor Yurin	(Kazakhstan)	MF	3 July 1982 (age 43)	Aktobe	2018		
21	Madi Zhakypbayev	(Kazakhstan)	MF	21 March 2000 (age 25)	loan from Astana	2018	2	0
22	Marat Shakhmetov	(Kazakhstan)	MF	6 February 1989 (age 36)	Akzhayik	2017	61	6
27	Egon Vůch	(Czech Republic)	MF	1 February 1991 (age 35)	loan from Tobol	2018	25	3
29	Lukáš Droppa	(Czech Republic)	MF	22 April 1989 (age 36)	Slovan Bratislava	2018	14	0
54	Maxim Galkin	(Kazakhstan)	MF	12 July 1999 (age 26)	Academy	2018	1	0
77	Gevorg Najaryan	(Kazakhstan)	MF	6 January 1998 (age 28)	Astana	2018	45	3
80	Aidos Oral	(Kazakhstan)	MF	5 April 1999 (age 26)	Academy	2018	0	0
84	Anton Chichulin	(Kazakhstan)	MF	27 November 1984 (age 41)	Atyrau	2018	13	1
Forwards
7	Sergei Shaff	(Kazakhstan)	FW	15 April 1988 (age 37)	Okzhetpes	2018	25	2
11	Gegham Harutyunyan	(Armenia)	FW	23 August 1990 (age 35)	loan from Gandzasar Kapan	2018	7	1
17	Oralkhan Omirtayev	(Kazakhstan)	FW	16 July 1998 (age 27)	Academy	2015	53	5
70	Zhanaly Pairouz	(Kazakhstan)	FW		Academy	2018	0	0
71	Vyacheslav Putintsev	(Kazakhstan)	FW	25 September 1997 (age 28)	Academy	2016	3	0
Players that left during the season
9	Aidos Tattybayev	(Kazakhstan)	FW	26 April 1990 (age 35)	Bolat	2016	70	10
13	Oleksandr Mihunov	(Ukraine)	MF	13 April 1994 (age 31)	Shakhtar Donetsk	2018	17	1
24	Milan Stojanović	(Serbia)	MF	10 May 1988 (age 37)	Metalac Gornji Milanovac	2017	47	10
31	Danijel Subotić	(Switzerland)	FW	31 January 1989 (age 37)	Ulsan Hyundai	2018	12	0

== Transfers ==
=== In ===
Date	Position	Nationality	Name	From	Fee	Ref.
26 January 2018	DF	(Ukraine)	Yevhen Tkachuk	Stal Kamianske	Undisclosed	
26 January 2018	MF	(Belarus)	Alyaksandr Valadzko	BATE Borisov	Undisclosed	
29 January 2018	FW	(Kazakhstan)	Sergei Shaff	Okzhetpes	Undisclosed	
12 February 2018	MF	(Montenegro)	Damir Kojašević	Vojvodina	Undisclosed	
14 February 2018	MF	(Ukraine)	Oleksandr Mihunov	Shakhtar Donetsk	Undisclosed	
2 March 2018	DF	(Kazakhstan)	Kirill Pasichnik	Buxoro	Undisclosed	
28 March 2018	FW	(Switzerland)	Danijel Subotić	Ulsan Hyundai	Undisclosed	
4 July 2018	MF	(Kazakhstan)	Igor Yurin	Aktobe	Undisclosed	
5 July 2018	MF	(Kazakhstan)	Anton Chichulin	Atyrau	Undisclosed	
18 July 2018	MF	(Czech Republic)	Lukáš Droppa	Slovan Bratislava	Undisclosed	
26 July 2018	MF	(Estonia)	Sergei Mošnikov	Górnik Łęczna	Undisclosed	
	MF	(Kazakhstan)	Gevorg Najaryan	Astana	Undisclosed	

=== Out ===
Date	Position	Nationality	Name	From	Fee	Ref.
25 December 2017	MF	(Serbia)	Marko Stanojević	Astana	Undisclosed	
	MF	(Slovakia)	Štefan Zošák	Poprad	Undisclosed	
	MF	(Slovakia)	Július Szöke	Shakhtyor Soligorsk	Undisclosed	
	FW	(Kazakhstan)	Sergei Khizhnichenko	Taraz	Undisclosed	
27 July 2018	FW	(Kazakhstan)	Aidos Tattybayev	Taraz	Undisclosed	

=== Loans in ===
Date from	Position	Nationality	Name	From	Date to	Ref.
19 February 2018	MF	(Kazakhstan)	Madi Zhakypbayev	Astana	End of Season	
10 March 2018	MF	(Czech Republic)	Egon Vůch	Tobol	End of Season	
30 July 2018	FW	(Armenia)	Gegham Harutyunyan	Gandzasar Kapan	End of Season	

=== Released ===
Date	Position	Nationality	Name	Joined	Date	Ref.
	GK	(Kazakhstan)	Yaroslav Baginskiy			
	MF	(Kazakhstan)	Vladislav Vasiliev	Energetik-BGU		
	DF	(England)	Korede Aiyegbusi	Amical Saint-Prex		
	MF	(Kazakhstan)	Grigori Dubkov			
	MF	(Kazakhstan)	Sergei Skorykh	Kyzylzhar		
	MF	(Kazakhstan)	Kuanysh Ermekov			
27 July 2018	MF	(Ukraine)	Oleksandr Mihunov	Dnipro-1		
30 July 2018	MF	(Serbia)	Milan Stojanović	Radnik Surdulica		
30 July 2018	FW	(Switzerland)	Danijel Subotić	Dinamo București		

== Friendlies ==
14 February 2018	Shakhter Karagandy (Kazakhstan)	2 – 1	(Armenia) Banants	Antalya, Turkey
(UTC+6)	Mihunov 38'; Stojanović 56'	Report	Goal

18 February 2018	Shakhter Karagandy (Kazakhstan)	1 – 1	(Serbia) Proleter Novi Sad	Antalya, Turkey
(UTC+6)	Maurice 38'	Report	14'	Referee: Denis Izmailov

22 February 2018	Shakhter Karagandy (Kazakhstan)	–	(Georgia (country)) Dinamo Tbilisi	Antalya, Turkey
(UTC+6)

== Competitions ==
=== Premier League ===
==== Results summary ====
Overall								Home						Away					
Pld	W	D	L	GF	GA	GD	Pts	W	D	L	GF	GA	GD	W	D	L	GF	GA	GD
33	8	12	13	29	36	−7	36	7	5	4	20	14	+6	1	7	9	9	22	−13

Last updated: 21 October 2018.
Source: See Results

==== Results by round ====
Round	1	2	3	4	5	6	7	8	9	10	11	12	13	14	15	16	17	18	19	20	21	22	23	24	25	26	27	28	29	30	31	32	33
Ground	A	A	H	H	A	H	A	H	A	A	A	A	A	A	H	A	H	A	H	A	H	H	A	H	A	A	H	A	H	A	H	H	A
Result	L	W	D	W	D	D	D	W	L	L	L	L	L	L	W	L	L	L	D	D	D	D	D	W	L	L	W	D	L	D	W	W	D
Position	9	6	7	5	5	5	5	4	5	5	7	7	8	10	9	10	11	11	11	11	11	11	10	10	10	11	11	12	12	12	11	9	8

Source: See Results
A = Away; H = Home; W = Win; D = Draw; L = Loss

==== Results ====
11 March 2018 1	Ordabasy	2 – 1	Shakhter Karagandy	Shymkent
15:00 (UTC+6)	Tungyshbayev 22'; T.Erlanov (yellow card) 48'; Nagaev 63'; Diakate (yellow card) 80'	Report	Shakhmetov (yellow card) 19'; Kojašević (yellow card) 40' (goal) 51'; Vůch (yellow card) 61'; Y.Tarasov (yellow card) 90+1'	Stadium: Kazhymukan Munaitpasov Stadium; Attendance: 12,000; Referee: Timur Kumashev

17 March 2018 2	Tobol	0 – 1	Shakhter Karagandy	Kostanay
15:00 (UTC+6)		Report	Shakhmetov (yellow card) 49'; Y.Tarasov 57'; Omirtayev (yellow card) 90+3'; Shatskiy (yellow card) 90+4'	Stadium: Stadion Zatobolets; Attendance: 2,500; Referee: Daniyar Sakhi

1 April 2018 3	Shakhter Karagandy	1 – 1	Zhetysu	Astana
15:00 (UTC+6)	S.Shaff 45'; M.Gabyshev (yellow card) 70'	Report	Ibraev (yellow card) 29'; Hromțov 80'	Stadium: Astana Arena; Attendance: 700; Referee: Aydin Rakhimbayev

7 April 2018 4	Shakhter Karagandy	2 – 1	Kyzylzhar	Temirtau
15:00 (UTC+6)	Kojašević 5'; Mihunov 9'; Y.Tarasov (yellow card) 51'	Report	Gogua (yellow card) 14'; D.Savchenko (yellow card) 45+1'; Stupić (yellow card) 57'; Popkhadze (yellow card) 90'; Punoševac 90+1'	Stadium: Metallurg Stadium; Attendance: 1,200; Referee: Ruslan Omarov

14 April 2018 5	Atyrau	0 – 0	Shakhter Karagandy	Atyrau
17:00 (UTC+6)		Report	Y.Tarasov (yellow card) 22'; I.Pikalkin (yellow card) 35'	Stadium: Tomarly Stadion; Attendance: 1,200; Referee: Aleksandr Gauzer

22 April 2018 6	Shakhter Karagandy	1 – 1	Aktobe	Temirtau
16:00 (UTC+6)	Subotić (yellow card) 51'; Valadzko (yellow card) 74'; Omirtayev 78'	Report	A.Kakimov 36'; Radin (yellow card) 63'; Z.Kukeyev (yellow card) 74'	Stadium: Metallurg Stadium; Attendance: 1,500; Referee: Saken Bayimbet

28 April 2018 7	Akzhayik	1 – 1	Shakhter Karagandy	Aksay
15:00 (UTC+6)	B.Shaikhov 26'; Borovyk (yellow card) 77'	Report	Tkachuk (yellow card) 28'; Valadzko 55'; Subotić (yellow card) 84'	Stadium: Karaşıganak Stadium; Attendance: 800; Referee: Denis Izmailov

5 May 2018 8	Shakhter Karagandy	1 – 0	Astana	Temirtau
16:00 (UTC+6)	Najaryan (yellow card) 15'; Shakhmetov (yellow card) 60'; Kojašević 70'; Mihunov (yellow card) 86'	Report	Muzhikov (yellow card) 78'; Postnikov (yellow card) 90+1'	Stadium: Metallurg Stadium; Attendance: 1,500; Referee: Grigory Moskovchenko

9 May 2018 9	Kaisar	3 – 0	Shakhter Karagandy	Kyzylorda
17:00 (UTC+6)	Coureur 14'; Korobkin (yellow card) 52'; Dja Djédjé 80'; Lamanje 88'	Report	I.Pikalkin (yellow card) 72'	Stadium: Gani Muratbayev Stadium; Attendance: 3,000; Referee: Igor Aleshin

13 May 2018 10	Shakhter Karagandy	0 – 1	Irtysh Pavlodar	Temirtau
16:00 (UTC+6)	Valadzko (yellow card) 10'; Shakhmetov (yellow card) 38'	Report	D.Shmidt (yellow card) 13'; Fonseca (yellow card) 43'; V.Vomenko (yellow card) 81'; R.Rozybakiev (yellow card) 90+1'; I.Pikalkin 90+3'	Stadium: Metallurg Stadium; Attendance: 1,000; Referee: Furkat Atajanov

19 May 2018 11	Kairat	2 – 0	Shakhter Karagandy	Almaty
18:00 (UTC+6)	Suyumbayev 43'; Juan Felipe (yellow card) 47'; Islamkhan 79'	Report	Mihunov (yellow card) 24'; Kojašević (yellow card) 43'	Stadium: Central Stadium; Attendance: 10,000; Referee: Bakhyt Kyzylbaev

27 May 2018 12	Shakhter Karagandy	0 – 1	Tobol	Temirtaw
17:00 (UTC+6)		Report	Dmitrenko (yellow card) 37'; Miroshnichenko 55'; Abilgazy (yellow card) 85'	Stadium: Metallurg Stadium; Attendance: 1,000; Referee: Marat Iskakov

31 May 2018 13	Zhetysu	1 – 0	Shakhter Karagandy	Taldıqorğan
17:00 (UTC+6)	Malakyan 14' (yellow card) 88'; Mukhutdinov (yellow card) 65'; Kozhamberdi (yellow card) 79'; Glavina (yellow card) 86'	Report	Tkachuk (yellow card) 85' (yellow-red card) 90'; Kojašević (yellow card) 88'	Stadium: Zhetysu Stadium; Attendance: 1,500; Referee: Timur Kumashev

18 June 2018 14	Kyzylzhar	1 – 0	Shakhter Karagandy	Petropavl
17:00 (UTC+6)	T.Muldinov (yellow card) 40' (goal) 88'; Gogua (yellow card) 81'	Report	M.Gabyshev (yellow card) 42'; Mužek (yellow card) 80'	Stadium: Karasay Stadium; Attendance: 2,000; Referee: Bolat Karlibayev

23 June 2018 15	Shakhter Karagandy	3 – 0	Atyrau	Karaganda
18:00 (UTC+6)	Kojašević 35'; Shakhmetov 74'; Y.Tarasov 87'	Report	R.Aslan (yellow card) 45'	Stadium: Shakhter Stadium; Attendance: 1,000; Referee: Denis Izmailov

1 July 2018 16	Aktobe	2 – 0	Shakhter Karagandy	Aktobe
21:00 (UTC+6)	Pizzelli 7', 52'; R.Nurmukhametov (yellow card) 32'; Simčević (red card) 64'; B.Kairov (yellow card) 78'	Report	Valadzko (yellow card) 51'; Tkachuk (yellow card) 58'; V.Tarasov (yellow card) 62'; Mihunov (yellow card) 79'	Stadium: Central Stadium; Attendance: 10,500; Referee: Furkat Atajanov

7 July 2018 17	Shakhter Karagandy	1 – 2	Akzhayik	Karaganda
19:00 (UTC+6)	Valadzko (yellow card) 66'; Kojašević 90+3'	Report	M.Sapanov 19'; Mané 82'	Stadium: Shakhter Stadium; Attendance: 500; Referee: Arman Ismuratov

14 July 2018 18	Astana	2 – 0	Shakhter Karagandy	Astana
20:00 (UTC+6)	Shchotkin 44'; Tomasov 82'	Report	K.Pasichnik (yellow card) 54'; Chichulin (yellow card) 90'	Stadium: Astana Arena; Attendance: 2,000; Referee: Bakhyt Kyzylbaev

21 July 2018 19	Shakhter Karagandy	2 – 2	Kaisar	Karaganda
19:00 (UTC+6)	A.Duysen (yellow card) 59'; Tkachuk 64'; Shakhmetov 70'	Report	Punoševac 4' (yellow card) 60'; V.Chureyev (yellow card) 26'; Arzhanov 59' (pen.); I.Amirseitov (yellow card) 67'; Korobkin (yellow card) 81'	Stadium: Shakhter Stadium; Attendance: 500; Referee: Sergey Gorokhovodatskiy

29 July 2018 20	Irtysh Pavlodar	1 – 1	Shakhter Karagandy	Pavlodar
19:30 (UTC+6)	Rodrigo 56'; Kislitsyn (yellow card) 67'	Report	Kojašević 64'; Shakhmetov (yellow card) 90+2'	Stadium: Central Stadium; Attendance: 3,000; Referee: Bagdat Abdullaev

5 August 2018 21	Shakhter Karagandy	1 – 1	Kairat	Karaganda
20:00 (UTC+6)	Omirtayev (yellow card) 40'; Vůch 54'; Kojašević (yellow card) 60'; A.Duysen (yellow card) 90'	Report	Iličević (yellow card) 21'; Eseola (yellow card) 76'; Arshavin 90+3' (pen.)	Stadium: Shakhter Stadium; Attendance: 6,000; Referee: Ashkat Abdanbayev

12 August 2018 22	Shakhter Karagandy	0 – 0	Ordabasy	Karaganda
20:00 (UTC+6)	M.Gabyshev (yellow card) 26'; Tkachuk (yellow card) 32'; Chichulin (yellow card) 90+2'	Report	Kovalchuk (yellow card) 36'; D.Dautov (yellow card) 77'; S.Shamshi (yellow card) 81'; Kojić (yellow card) 90+2'	Stadium: Shakhter Stadium; Attendance: 3,000; Referee: Denis Tevyashov

18 August 2018 23	Shakhter Karagandy	–	Astana	Karaganda
(UTC+6)				Stadium: Shakhter Stadium

25 August 2018 24	Irtysh Pavlodar	1 – 1	Shakhter Karagandy	Pavlodar
18:30 (UTC+6)	Shabalin 39'; Camará (yellow card) 45'; Fonseca (yellow card) 56'; D.Shmidt (yellow card) 69'; Kislitsyn (yellow card) 80'; Adri (red card) 90+5'	Report	Shakhmetov 83' (pen.) (yellow card) 90+3'	Stadium: Central Stadium; Attendance: 3,000; Referee: Arman Ismuratov

16 September 2018 25	Shakhter Karagandy	2 – 1	Atyrau	Karaganda
18:00 (UTC+6)	S.Shaff 39'; Tkachuk (yellow card) 41'; Kojašević 85'	Report	Obšivač 9'; Ablitarov (yellow card) 85'	Stadium: Shakhter Stadium; Attendance: 3,000; Referee: Saken Bayimbet

22 September 2018 27	Kaisar	2 – 1	Shakhter Karagandy	Kyzylorda
16:00 (UTC+6)	Tagybergen (yellow card) 24' (goal) 51' (pen.); Narzildaev (yellow card) 39'; Baizhanov (yellow card) 56'; Punoševac (yellow card) 71' (goal) 80'; I.Amirseitov (yellow card) 85'	Report	Vůch 23'; I.Pikalkin (yellow card) 41'; Y.Tarasov (yellow card) 50'; B.Kulbekov (yellow card) 55'	Stadium: Gani Muratbayev Stadium; Attendance: 2,200; Referee: Timur Kumashev

26 September 2018 25	Kyzylzhar	2 – 1	Shakhter Karagandy	Petropavl
15:00 (UTC+6)	Coronel (yellow card) 36'; Ceesay 52'; Grigalashvili (yellow card) 78'; E.Nabiev 90' (yellow card) 90+1'	Report	Droppa (yellow card) 73'; Najaryan 76'; Y.Tarasov (yellow card) 88'	Stadium: Avangard Stadium; Attendance: 3,000; Referee: Aleksandr Aliyev

30 September 2018 28	Shakhter Karagandy	1 – 0	Akzhayik	Karaganda
15:00 (UTC+6)	Chichulin 31'; Harutyunyan (yellow card) 89'	Report	Glavina (yellow card) 35'	Stadium: Shakhter Stadium; Attendance: 2,000; Referee: Sergey Gorokhovodatskiy

6 October 2018 29	Zhetysu	1 – 1	Shakhter Karagandy	Taldıqorğan
16:00 (UTC+6)	Kuantayev (yellow card) 27'; O.Kerimzhanov (yellow card) 31'; Hromțov (yellow card) 41'; Stepanyuk 69'; Ibraev (yellow card) 73'	Report	Najaryan 8'; Y.Tarasov (yellow card) 79'	Stadium: Zhetysu Stadium; Attendance: 2,000; Referee: Askhat Abdanbayev

21 October 2018 30	Shakhter Karagandy	0 – 1	Aktobe	Karaganda
15:00 (UTC+6)	Droppa (yellow card) 19'; Shakhmetov (yellow card) 24'; Yurin (yellow card) 39'	Report	Miličević 19' (pen.); Volkov (yellow card) 49'	Stadium: Shakhter Stadium; Attendance: 1,000; Referee: Aydin Rakhimbayev

27 October 2018 31	Ordabasy	1 – 1	Shakhter Karagandy	Shymkent
16:00 (UTC+6)	Moldakaraev 16' (yellow card) 16'	Report	Najaryan (yellow card) 48'; Shakhmetov 57'; Vůch (yellow card) 72'	Stadium: Kazhymukan Munaitpasov Stadium; Attendance: 2,000; Referee: Denis Izmailov

31 October 2018 23	Shakhter Karagandy	3 – 1	Astana	Karaganda
19:00 (UTC+6)	Omirtayev 21', 27', 38'	Report	S.Sagnayev (yellow card) 60'; Prokopenko (yellow card) 65'; Karimov 85'	Stadium: Shakhter Stadium; Attendance: 1,000; Referee: Furkat Atajanov
Note: Match originally scheduled for 18 August 2018

3 November 2018 32	Shakhter Karagandy	2 – 1	Tobol	Temirtau
15:00 (UTC+6)	Harutyunyan 37' (yellow card) 44'; Kojašević 76'	Report	Turysbek (yellow card) 43'; Dmitrenko 89'	Stadium: Metallurg Stadium; Attendance: 500; Referee: Bakhyt Kyzylbaev

11 November 2018 33	Kairat	0 – 0	Shakhter Karagandy	Almaty
15:00 (UTC+6)	Paragulgov (yellow card) 14'; Shvyrev (yellow card) 28'	Report	Tkachuk (yellow card) 14'; Droppa (yellow card) 49'; Shatskiy (yellow card) 90+5'	Stadium: Central Stadium; Attendance: 10,500; Referee: Bagdat Abdullaev

==== League table ====
Pos	Team	Pld	W	D	L	GF	GA	GD	Pts	Qualification or relegation
6	Zhetysu	33	11	10	12	36	40	−4	43	
7	Aktobe (Note: Aktobe had six points deducted on 27 April 2018 as a punishment for unpaid debts to former player Danilo Neco.)	33	13	9	11	51	47	+4	42	
8	Shakhter Karagandy	33	8	12	13	29	36	−7	36	
9	Atyrau	33	9	9	15	34	47	−13	36	
10	Irtysh Pavlodar (O)	33	10	5	18	28	45	−17	35	Qualification for the relegation play-offs

Source: UEFA, Soccerway
Rules for classification: 1) Points; 2) Goal difference; 3) Matches won; 4) Goals scored; 5) Away goals scored; 6) Head-to-head points; 7) Head-to-head matches won; 8) Head-to-head goal difference; 9) Head-to-head goals scored; 10) Head-to-head away goals scored; 11) Draw.
(O) Play-off winners

=== Kazakhstan Cup ===
18 April 2018 Last 16	Shakhter Karagandy	0 – 0 (a.e.t.) (7 – 6 p)	Kyzylzhar	Temirtau
16:00 (UTC+6)	K.Pasichnik (yellow card) 108'	Report	Delić (yellow card) 90+1'; Popkhadze (yellow card) 59' (yellow-red card) 120'	Stadium: Metallurg Stadium; Attendance: 800; Referee: Ruslan Sultangaliev
	Penalties
	Tkachuk (penalty scored); Kirill Pasichnik (penalty scored); Subotić (penalty scored); Aidos Tattybayev (penalty scored); Stojanović (penalty missed); Vyacheslav Putintsev (penalty scored); Najaryan (penalty scored); Gabyshev (penalty scored)		Stupić (penalty missed); Punoševac (penalty scored); Muldarov (penalty scored); Timur Muldinov (penalty scored); Coronel (penalty scored); Aslan Dzhanuzakov (penalty scored); Viktor Gunchenko (penalty scored); Ildar Aitov (penalty missed)

23 May 2018 Quarterfinal	Shakhter Karagandy	2 – 1 (a.e.t.)	Kaisar	Temirtau
17:00 (UTC+6)	Tkachuk (yellow card) 33'; Sergei Shaff 56'; Najaryan (yellow card) 89'; Kojašević 119' (pen.)	Report	Kamara (yellow card) 35'; Dja Djédjé 41'; Arzhanov (yellow card) 88'; Zhangylyshbay (yellow card) 90+1'; Tazhimbetov (yellow card) 97'; Aybol Zhakhayev (yellow card) 119'	Stadium: Metallurg Stadium; Attendance: 500; Referee: Ruslan Omarov

14 June 2018 Semifinal 1st leg	Shakhter Karagandy	0 – 0	Atyrau	Karaganda
18:30 (UTC+6)	Mihunov (yellow card) 38'; Najaryan (yellow card) 72'; Y.Tarasov (yellow card) 77'	Report	Ablitarov (yellow card) 77'	Stadium: Shakhter Stadium; Attendance: 2,500; Referee: Daniyar Sakhi

27 June 2018 Semifinal 2nd leg	Atyrau	3 – 1 (3 – 1 agg.)	Shakhter Karagandy	Atyrau
20:00 (UTC+6)	Sikimić 3'; Zyankovich 36'; Ruslan Esatov (yellow card) 53'; Rafkat Aslan (yellow card) 58'; Khairullin 62' (pen.); Dauren Kayralliyev (yellow card) 81'; Kuanish Kalmuratov (yellow card) 83'	Report	Vůch 16'; Shakhmetov (yellow card) 77'	Stadium: Munaishy Stadium; Attendance: 2,000; Referee: Saken Bayimbet

== Squad statistics ==
As of match played 11 November 2018

=== Appearances and goals ===
No.	Pos	Nat	Player	Total		Premier League		Kazakhstan Cup	
No.	Pos	Nat	Player	Apps	Goals	Apps	Goals	Apps	Goals
1	GK	(Kazakhstan) KAZ	Abylaikhan Duysen	9	0	6+1	0	2	0
3	DF	(Ukraine) UKR	Yevhen Tkachuk	29	1	26	1	3	0
4	DF	(Kazakhstan) KAZ	Mikhail Gabyshev	22	0	17+3	0	1+1	0
5	DF	(Kazakhstan) KAZ	Kirill Pasichnik	5	0	1+3	0	1	0
6	DF	(Kazakhstan) KAZ	Ilnur Mangutkin	11	0	3+5	0	3	0
7	FW	(Kazakhstan) KAZ	Sergei Shaff	26	3	14+9	2	1+2	1
8	MF	(Belarus) BLR	Alyaksandr Valadzko	27	1	20+6	1	0+1	0
10	MF	(Montenegro) MNE	Damir Kojašević	29	9	25+1	8	2+1	1
11	FW	(Armenia) ARM	Gegham Harutyunyan	7	1	3+4	1	0	0
16	MF	(Estonia) EST	Sergei Mošnikov	9	0	6+3	0	0	0
17	FW	(Kazakhstan) KAZ	Oralkhan Omirtayev	25	4	9+14	4	2	0
18	MF	(Kazakhstan) KAZ	Igor Yurin	5	0	4+1	0	0	0
19	DF	(Kazakhstan) KAZ	Yevgeny Tarasov	25	2	16+6	2	3	0
20	DF	(Croatia) CRO	Mateo Mužek	33	0	29+1	0	3	0
21	MF	(Kazakhstan) KAZ	Madi Zhakypbayev	2	0	0+1	0	1	0
22	MF	(Kazakhstan) KAZ	Marat Shakhmetov	35	4	32	4	3	0
23	DF	(Kazakhstan) KAZ	Birzhan Kulbekov	12	0	10+1	0	1	0
27	MF	(Czech Republic) CZE	Egon Vůch	26	3	16+7	2	2+1	1
29	MF	(Czech Republic) CZE	Lukáš Droppa	14	0	14	0	0	0
30	GK	(Kazakhstan) KAZ	Igor Shatskiy	27	0	25	0	2	0
34	DF	(Kazakhstan) KAZ	Igor Pikalkin	25	0	19+4	0	2	0
40	GK	(Kazakhstan) KAZ	Yegor Tsuprikov	2	0	2	0	0	0
54	MF	(Kazakhstan) KAZ	Maxim Galkin	1	0	0	0	1	0
55	DF	(Kazakhstan) KAZ	Ruslan Alimbayev	10	0	5+4	0	0+1	0
71	FW	(Kazakhstan) KAZ	Vyacheslav Putintsev	1	0	0	0	1	0
77	MF	(Kazakhstan) KAZ	Gevorg Najaryan	28	2	14+11	2	3	0
84	MF	(Kazakhstan) KAZ	Anton Chichulin	14	1	13+1	1	0	0
Players away from Shakhter Karagandy on loan:
Players who left Shakhter Karagandy during the season:
9	FW	(Kazakhstan) KAZ	Aidos Tattybayev	7	0	2+3	0	1+1	0
13	MF	(Ukraine) UKR	Oleksandr Mihunov	18	1	16	1	2	0
24	MF	(Serbia) SRB	Milan Stojanović	17	1	12+3	1	1+1	0
31	FW	(Switzerland) SUI	Danijel Subotić	13	0	6+3	0	3+1	0

=== Goal scorers ===
Place	Position	Nation	Number	Name	Premier League	Kazakhstan Cup	Total
1	MF	(Montenegro)	10	Damir Kojašević	8	1	9
2	MF	(Kazakhstan)	22	Marat Shakhmetov	4	0	4
2	FW	(Kazakhstan)	17	Oralkhan Omirtayev	4	0	4
4	FW	(Kazakhstan)	7	Sergei Shaff	2	1	3
4	MF	(Czech Republic)	27	Egon Vůch	2	1	3
6	DF	(Kazakhstan)	19	Yevgeny Tarasov	2	0	2
6	MF	(Kazakhstan)	77	Gevorg Najaryan	2	0	2
8	MF	(Ukraine)	13	Oleksandr Mihunov	1	0	1
8	MF	(Belarus)	8	Alyaksandr Valadzko	1	0	1
8	DF	(Ukraine)	3	Yevhen Tkachuk	1	0	1
8	MF	(Kazakhstan)	84	Anton Chichulin	1	0	1
8	FW	(Armenia)	11	Gegham Harutyunyan	1	0	1
				TOTALS	29	3	32

=== Disciplinary record ===
Number	Nation	Position	Name	Premier League		Kazakhstan Cup		Total	
Number	Nation	Position	Name	Booked	Sent off (straight red)	Booked	Sent off (straight red)	Booked	Sent off (straight red)
1	(Kazakhstan)	GK	Abylaikhan Duysen	2	0	0	0	2	0
3	(Ukraine)	DF	Yevhen Tkachuk	7	1	1	0	8	1
4	(Kazakhstan)	DF	Mikhail Gabyshev	3	0	0	0	3	0
5	(Kazakhstan)	DF	Kirill Pasichnik	1	0	1	0	2	0
7	(Kazakhstan)	FW	Sergei Shaff	0	0	1	0	1	0
8	(Belarus)	MF	Alyaksandr Valadzko	4	0	0	0	4	0
10	(Montenegro)	MF	Damir Kojašević	4	0	0	0	4	0
11	(Armenia)	FW	Gegham Harutyunyan	2	0	0	0	2	0
17	(Kazakhstan)	FW	Oralkhan Omirtayev	2	0	0	0	2	0
18	(Kazakhstan)	MF	Igor Yurin	1	0	0	0	1	0
19	(Kazakhstan)	DF	Yevgeny Tarasov	7	0	1	0	8	0
20	(Croatia)	DF	Mateo Mužek	1	0	0	0	1	0
22	(Kazakhstan)	MF	Marat Shakhmetov	7	0	1	0	8	0
23	(Kazakhstan)	DF	Birzhan Kulbekov	1	0	0	0	1	0
27	(Czech Republic)	MF	Egon Vůch	2	0	0	0	2	0
29	(Czech Republic)	MF	Lukáš Droppa	3	0	0	0	3	0
30	(Kazakhstan)	GK	Igor Shatskiy	2	0	0	0	2	0
34	(Kazakhstan)	DF	Igor Pikalkin	3	0	0	0	3	0
77	(Kazakhstan)	MF	Gevorg Najaryan	2	0	2	0	4	0
88	(Kazakhstan)	MF	Anton Chichulin	2	0	0	0	2	0
Players who left Shakhter Karagandy during the season:
13	(Ukraine)	MF	Oleksandr Mihunov	3	0	1	0	4	0
31	(Switzerland)	FW	Danijel Subotić	2	0	0	0	2	0
			TOTALS	61	1	8	0	69	1
