= Luwagga Kizito =

Ugandan footballer (born 1993)

Personal information
- Full name: Luwagga William Kizito
- Date of birth: 20 December 1993 (age 32)
- Place of birth: Kisubi, Uganda
- Height: 1.74 m (5 ft 9 in)
- Position: Winger

Team information
- Current team: Wakiso Giants

Senior career*
Years	Team	Apps	(Gls)
2009–2012	Vipers		
2012–2014	Leixões	33	(5)
2014–2015	Covilhã	56	(15)
2015–2017	Rio Ave	11	(0)
2016	→ Feirense (loan)	15	(5)
2017–2020	Politehnica Iași	28	(3)
2018	→ BATE Borisov (loan)	3	(0)
2019	→ Shakhter Karagandy (loan)	24	(5)
2020–2021	Hapoel Kfar Saba	42	(9)
2021–2022	Hapoel Nof HaGalil	28	(3)
2022–2023	Sabail	19	(1)
2023–2024	Hapoel Rishon LeZion	17	(2)
2025–	Wakiso Giants	0	(0)

International career^{‡}
2012–	Uganda	47	(1)
- * Club domestic league appearances and goals as of 31 May 2024 ‡ National team caps and goals as of 21 November 2023

Luwagga William Kizito (born 20 December 1993) is a Ugandan professional footballer who plays as a winger for Ugandan club Wakiso Giants.

== Club career ==
=== Vipers ===
Born in the district of Wakiso, Kizito began his football career with local club Vipers S.C. in 2009, at the age of 15. During his first professional season with the Vipers in 2010, the team won the Ugandan Super League for the first time ever. He remained with the club for a further two seasons.

=== Leixões ===
In summer 2012, Kizito signed with Portuguese second division side Leixões, becoming the first Ugandan footballer to play for a Portuguese team. He made his debut for the Matosinhos club on 16 September against Leça in a Taça de Portugal second round tie. He scored one goal as his team won 4–1. He followed up with goals in the Taça da Liga and Segunda Liga, against Vitória de Setúbal and Braga B. His goal scoring continued during the next several games with goals against Naval in domestic league action.

His goal scoring attracted interest from Porto. Kizito, however, suffered a goal-scoring drought as he scored only two goals from October to the end of the season. Despite this drought, he helped his side finish third in the league, five points short of Arouca, who finished second and be promoted to the top flight. During his first season with Leixões, he made 30 appearances and scored seven goals.

=== Covilhã ===
On 4 January 2014, Kizito signed with S.C. Covilhã.

=== Rio Ave ===
He then moved to Rio Ave in July 2015.

=== Shakhter Karagandy(loan) ===
On 13 March 2019, Shakhter Karagandy announced the loan signing of Kizito for the 2019 season.

=== Hapoel Kfar Saba ===
On 9 January 2020 signed the Israeli Premier League club Hapoel Kfar Saba.

== International career ==
Kizito received his first call up to the Ugandan national team in 2012. On 4 June 2016, Kizito scored his first international goal against Botswana. Kizito participated in the 2017 Africa Cup of Nations. After the tournament, coach of the Uganda Cranes Milutin Sredojević vowed never to call up Kizito to Cranes duty after a misunderstanding with the orthodox tactician.

== Career statistics ==
As of matches played on 27 July 2019

Appearances and goals by national team and year
National team	Year	Apps	Goals
Uganda	2012	2	0
Uganda	2013	1	0
Uganda	2014	11	0
Uganda	2015	4	0
Uganda	2016	10	1
Uganda	2017	6	0
Uganda	2018	3	0
Uganda	2019	1	0
Total		38	1

As of match played 4 June 2016
Scores and results list Uganda's goal tally first, score column indicates score after each Kizito goal.

List of international goals scored by Luwagga Kizito
No.	Date	Venue	Cap	Opponent	Score	Result	Competition
1	4 June 2016	Francistown Stadium, Francistown, Botswana	22	Botswana	1–0	2–1	2017 Africa Cup of Nations qualification

== Honours ==
Vipers

- Ugandan Super League: 2009–10

BATE Borisov

- Belarusian Premier League: 2018
