= Oralkhan Omirtayev =

Kazakhstani footballer

Personal information
- Full name: Oralkhan Yergaliuly Omirtayev
- Date of birth: 16 July 1998 (age 28)
- Place of birth: Tomdi District, Uzbekistan
- Height: 1.77 m (5 ft 9 1/2 in)
- Position: Forward

Team information
- Current team: Okzhetpes
- Number: 19

Youth career
- Shakhter Karagandy

Senior career*
Years	Team	Apps	(Gls)
2015–2019	Shakhter Karagandy	70	(8)
2020–2021	Tobol	17	(2)
2021	Shakhter Karagandy	5	(2)
2022	Akzhayik	23	(3)
2023	Atyrau	25	(1)
2024	Slutsk	13	(4)
2024	BATE Borisov	14	(6)
2025	Aktobe	23	(4)
2026–	Okzhetpes	25	(9)

International career^{‡}
2014	Kazakhstan U17	3	(0)
2016	Kazakhstan U18	5	(0)
2015	Kazakhstan U19	3	(0)
2017	Kazakhstan U21	11	(2)
2018–	Kazakhstan	10	(2)
- * Club domestic league appearances and goals as of 1 November 2026 ‡ National team caps and goals as of 14:00, 31 March 2026 (UTC)

Oralkhan Yergaliuly Omirtayev (Kazakh: Оралхан Ерғалиұлы Өміртаев, Oralhan Erğaliūly Ömırtaev; born 16 July 1998) is a Kazakh footballer who currently plays as a forward for Okzhetpes and the Kazakhstan national team.

== Club career ==
Oralkhan Omirtayev was born in Tamdy district, Navoi region, Uzbekistan. When he was 6 years old, he moved to Kazakhstan. At 11, he started playing football.

=== Shakhter Karagandy ===
On 20 November 2018, Omirtayev signed a new one-year contract with Shakhter Karagandy, keeping him at the club until the end of the 2019 season.

=== Tobol ===
On 16 December 2019, Omirtayev signed for Tobol. After 18-months with the club, Omirtayev left Tobol on 29 June 2021 after his contract was ended by mutual consent.

=== Shakhter Karagandy Return ===
Omirtayev returned to Shakhter Karagandy on 5 July 2021.

== International ==
He made his debut for Kazakhstan national football team on 19 November 2018 in a Nations League game against Georgia, when he came on as an 88th-minute substitute for Maxim Fedin and scored a goal 2 minutes later in a 1–2 loss.

== Career statistics ==
=== Club ===
As of match played 15 September 2022

Appearances and goals by club, season and competition
Club	Season	League			National Cup		Continental		Other		Total	
Club	Season	Division	Apps	Goals	Apps	Goals	Apps	Goals	Apps	Goals	Apps	Goals
Shakhter Karagandy	2015	Kazakhstan Premier League	7	0	0	0	–		–		7	0
Shakhter Karagandy	2016	Kazakhstan Premier League	5	0	0	0	–		–		5	0
Shakhter Karagandy	2017	Kazakhstan Premier League	15	1	1	0	–		-		16	1
Shakhter Karagandy	2018	Kazakhstan Premier League	23	4	2	0	–		-		25	4
Shakhter Karagandy	2019	Kazakhstan Premier League	20	2	1	0	–		-		21	2
Shakhter Karagandy	Total		70	7	4	0	-	-	-	-	74	7
Tobol	2020	Kazakhstan Premier League	13	1	0	0	–		–		13	1
Tobol	2021	Kazakhstan Premier League	4	1	0	0	–		2	0	6	1
Tobol	Total		17	2	0	0	–		2	0	19	2
Shakhter Karagandy	2021	Kazakhstan Premier League	5	2	8	3	5	0	–		18	5
Akzhayik	2022	Kazakhstan Premier League	16	3	7	1	–		–		23	4
Career total			108	14	19	4	5	0	2	0	135	18

=== International ===
Kazakhstan national team
Year	Apps	Goals
2018	1	1
2019	1	1
2021	3	0
2025	4	0
Total	9	2

Statistics accurate as of match played 18 November 2025

=== International goals ===
Scores and results list Kazakhstan's goal tally first.

No.	Date	Venue	Opponent	Score	Result	Competition
1.	19 November 2018	Boris Paichadze Dinamo Arena, Tbilisi, Georgia	Georgia	1–2	1–2	2018–19 UEFA Nations League D
2.	21 February 2019	Titanic Deluxe Belek Futbol Sahası, Antalya, Turkey	Moldova	1–0	1–0	Friendly
