= Gegham Harutyunyan =

Armenian footballer

Personal information
- Date of birth: 23 August 1990 (age 36)
- Place of birth: Yerevan, Armenia
- Height: 1.75 m (5 ft 9 in)
- Position: Forward

Senior career*
Years	Team	Apps	(Gls)
2008–2014	Ulisses	37	(2)
2014–2021	Gandzasar Kapan	136	(52)
2018	→ Shakhter Karagandy (loan)	7	(1)
2021–2022	Noah	26	(4)
2022–2023	Van	16	(0)
- * Club domestic league appearances and goals as of 18:54, 22 July 2023 (UTC)

Gegham Harutyunyan (born 23 August 1990) is an Armenian professional footballer who last played as a forward for Van.

== Club career ==
Harutyunyan's first senior club was Ulisses, with whom he made his debut for in the 2008 Armenian Cup. Harutyunyan's first appearance in league football came in 2012 vs. Mika. In his final campaign with Ulisses, Harutyunyan scored two goals in twenty-four matches; the last coming against Shirak in May 2014. Gandzasar Kapan completed the signing of Harutyunyan a month later. After scoring twenty-four goals in 2016–17 and 2017–18, which included four goals in a game with Ararat Yerevan on 1 May 2018 – the first was Gandzasar's 400th goal in top-flight history, Harutyunyan departed Armenia to play in Kazakhstan for Shakhter Karagandy on loan two months after. A debut professional appearance arrived on 5 August versus Kairat.

On 28 July 2022, Harutyunyan signed for Van, leaving them on 7 February 2023.

== International career ==
Harutyunyan was selected in Armenia's senior squad in October 2016 for 2018 FIFA World Cup qualifiers against Poland and Romania. However, he was an unused substitute on both occasions.

== Career statistics ==
As of match played 1 July 2020.

Club statistics
Club	Season	League			Cup		Continental		Other		Total	
Club	Season	Division	Apps	Goals	Apps	Goals	Apps	Goals	Apps	Goals	Apps	Goals
Ulisses	2008	Armenian Premier League	0	0	1	0	—		0	0	1	0
Ulisses	2009	Armenian Premier League	0	0	0	0	—		0	0	0	0
Ulisses	2010	Armenian Premier League	0	0	0	0	0	0	0	0	0	0
Ulisses	2011	Armenian Premier League	0	0	1	0	0	0	0	0	1	0
Ulisses	2012–13	Armenian Premier League	13	0	2	0	0	0	1 (Note: Appearance(s) in the Armenian Supercup)	0	16	0
Ulisses	2013–14	Armenian Premier League	24	2	2	1	—		0	0	26	3
Ulisses	Total		37	2	6	1	0	0	1	0	44	3
Gandzasar Kapan	2014–15	Armenian Premier League	27	7	1	0	—		0	0	28	7
Gandzasar Kapan	2015–16	Armenian Premier League	24	5	4	0	—		0	0	28	5
Gandzasar Kapan	2016–17	Armenian Premier League	29	12	2	0	—		0	0	31	12
Gandzasar Kapan	2017–18	Armenian Premier League	26	12	2	0	1 (Note: Appearance(s) in the UEFA Europa League)	0	0	0	29	12
Gandzasar Kapan	2018–19	Armenian Premier League	15	8	0	0	2	1	0	0	17	9
Gandzasar Kapan	2019–20	Armenian Premier League	12	6	4	2	-		-		16	8
Gandzasar Kapan	Total		133	50	13	2	3	1	0	0	149	53
Shakhter Karagandy (loan)	2018	Kazakhstan Premier League	7	1	0	0	—		—		7	1
Career total			177	53	19	3	3	1	1	0	200	57

== Honours ==
Gandzasar Kapan

- Armenian Cup: 2017–18
