= Egon Vůch =

Czech footballer

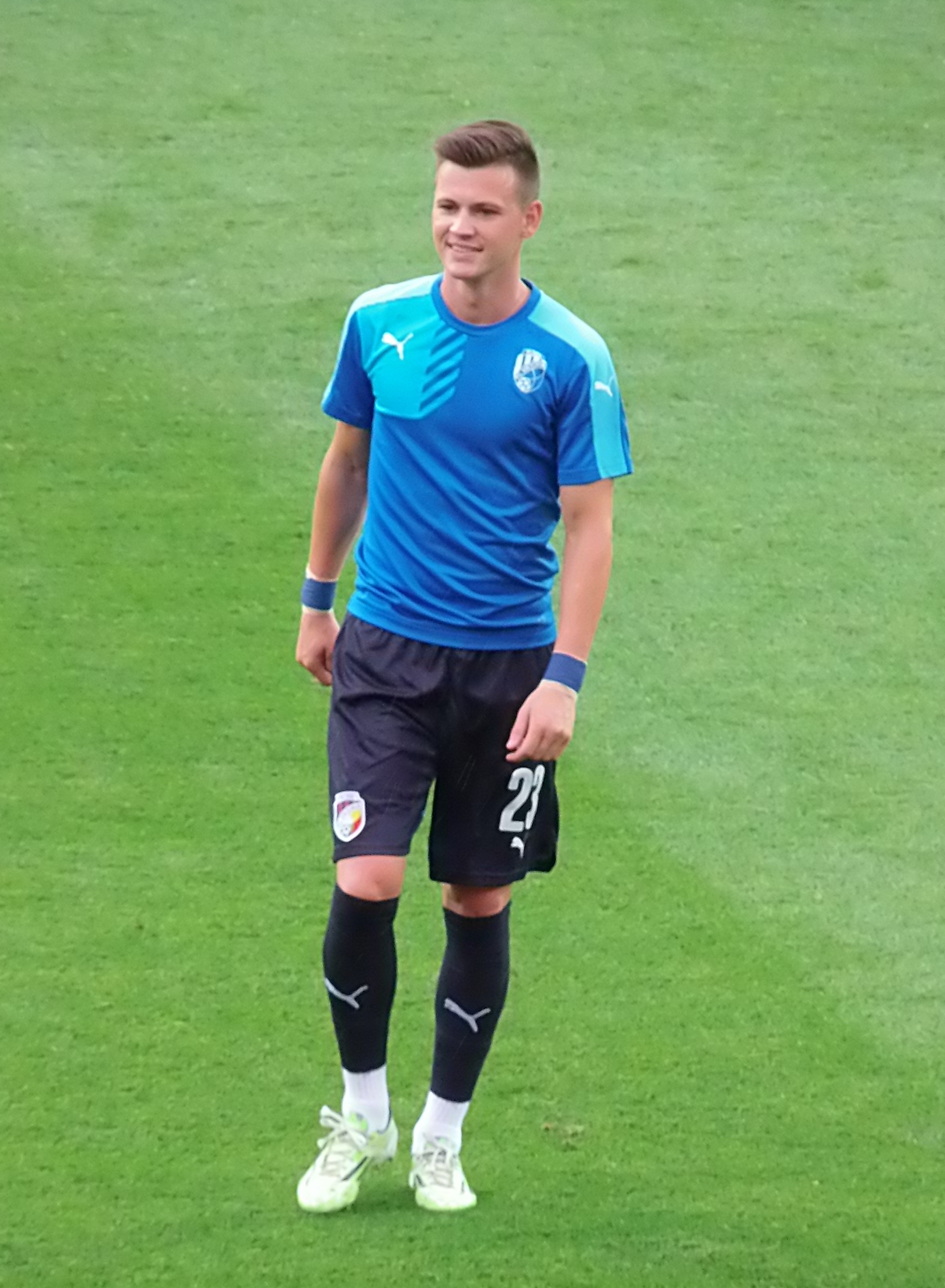

Personal information
- Date of birth: 1 February 1991 (age 35)
- Place of birth: Plzeň, Czechoslovakia
- Height: 1.77 m (5 ft 10 in)
- Position: Right midfielder

Team information
- Current team: Jiskra Domažlice
- Number: 7

Senior career*
Years	Team	Apps	(Gls)
2011–2015	Teplice	88	(8)
2015–2017	Viktoria Plzeň	3	(0)
2016–2017	→ Slovan Liberec (loan)	30	(3)
2017–2018	Tobol	12	(3)
2018	→ Shakhter Karagandy (loan)	23	(2)
2019	Příbram	2	(0)
2019–2020	Jiskra Domažlice	9	(1)
2020	Viktoria Žižkov	11	(1)
2020–	Jiskra Domažlice	7	(3)

International career
2011–2012	Czech Republic U21	4	(0)
- * Club domestic league appearances and goals as of 20:48, 10 June 2021 (UTC)

Egon Vůch (born 1 February 1991) is a Czech football player who currently plays for Jiskra Domažlice. He has also played for the under-21 team of his country.

== Career ==
=== Club ===
On 10 March 2018, Vůch signed for FC Shakhter Karagandy on loan from FC Tobol.
