= Bauyrzhan Baytana =

Kazakhstani footballer

Personal information
- Full name: Bauyrzhan Nurlanuly Baytana
- Date of birth: 6 June 1992 (age 34)
- Place of birth: Taraz, Kazakhstan
- Height: 1.74 m (5 ft 9 in)
- Position: Midfielder

Team information
- Current team: Taraz
- Number: 10

Senior career*
Years	Team	Apps	(Gls)
2009–2014	Taraz	61	(3)
2011	→ Atyrau (loan)	9	(0)
2012	→ Sunkar (loan)	13	(1)
2013	→ Tobol (loan)	21	(0)
2014–2015	Kairat	11	(0)
2016	Taraz	15	(1)
2017	Aktobe	21	(2)
2018–2019	Taraz	12	(1)
2019	Shakhter Karagandy	12	(0)
2020–2022	Taraz	45	(7)
2022–2024	Aktobe	35	(2)
2024	Zhenis	0	(0)
2025	Caspiy	21	(5)
2026–	Taraz	22	(5)

International career^{‡}
2010	Kazakhstan U19	3	(1)
2013	Kazakhstan U21	1	(0)
2014–	Kazakhstan	1	(0)
- * Club domestic league appearances and goals as of 2 November 2026 ‡ National team caps and goals as of 9 May 2019

Bauyrzhan Nurlanuly Baytana (Kazakh: Бауыржан Нұрланұлы Байтана, Bauyrjan Nūrlanūly Baitana; born 6 June 1992) is a Kazakhstani footballer who plays as a midfielder for Taraz.

== Career ==
On 10 August 2020, Baytana returned to FC Taraz.

== Career statistics ==
=== International ===
As of match played 12 August 2014

Kazakhstan
Year	Apps	Goals
2014	1	0
Total	1	0
