= 2020 FC Taraz season =

FC Taraz
2020 season
- Chairman: Sagat Yensegenuly
- Manager: Vladimir Nikitenko
- Stadium: Central Stadium
- Premier League: 8th
- Kazakhstan Cup: Canceled due to the COVID-19 pandemic
- Top goalscorer: League: Toni Silva (4); All: Toni Silva (4)
Home colours	Away colours

The 2020 FC Taraz season was the club's second season back in the Kazakhstan Premier League following their relegation at the end of the 2017 season, and 29th season in total.

== Season events ==
On 13 March, the Football Federation of Kazakhstan announced all league fixtures would be played behind closed doors for the foreseeable future due to the COVID-19 pandemic. On 16 March the Football Federation of Kazakhstan suspended all football until 15 April.

On 26 July, it was announced that the league would resume on 1 July, with no fans being permitted to watch the games. The league was suspended for a second time on 3 July, for an initial two weeks, due to an increase in COVID-19 cases in the country.

== Squad ==
As of match played 30 November 2020

No.	Name	Nationality	Position	Date of birth (age)	Signed from	Signed in	Contract ends	Apps.	Goals
Goalkeepers
1	Almas Khamytbekov	(Kazakhstan)	GK	29 September 1991 (age 35)	Makhtaaral	2018			
24	Dzhurakhon Babakhanov	(Kazakhstan)	GK	31 October 1991 (age 35)	Okzhetpes	2020			
74	Mukhammejan Seisen	(Kazakhstan)	GK	14 February 1999 (age 27)	Youth Team	2018			
Defenders
4	Bekzat Shadmanov	(Kazakhstan)	DF	12 August 1997 (age 29)	Youth Team	2017			
5	Valery Karshakevich	(Belarus)	DF	15 February 1988 (age 38)	Mordovia Saransk	2020		20	1
14	Berik Aitbayev	(Kazakhstan)	DF	26 June 1991 (age 35)	Irtysh Pavlodar	2018			
20	Maksat Amirkhanov	(Kazakhstan)	DF	10 February 1992 (age 34)	Irtysh Pavlodar	2018			
22	Madiyar Nuraly	(Kazakhstan)	DF	20 January 1995 (age 31)	Lashyn	2015			
23	Dejan Boljević	(Montenegro)	DF	30 May 1990 (age 36)	Budućnost Podgorica	2020		18	1
25	Mikhail Mishchenko	(Russia)	DF	27 June 1989 (age 37)	Torpedo-BelAZ Zhodino	2020		5	0
27	Dmitry Evstingeyev	(Kazakhstan)	DF	21 November 1986 (age 39)	Makhtaaral	2020			
Midfielders
6	Adilet Abdenaby	(Kazakhstan)	MF	4 February 1996 (age 30)	Makhtaaral	2020			
7	Abzal Taubay	(Kazakhstan)	MF	18 February 1995 (age 31)	Youth Team	2015			
8	Sheykhislam Kulakhmetov	(Kazakhstan)	MF	15 January 1996 (age 30)	Youth Team	2014			
9	Ovidijus Verbickas	(Lithuania)	MF	4 July 1993 (age 33)	Sūduva	2020		14	0
11	Gavril Kan	(Kazakhstan)	MF	10 January 1999 (age 27)	Youth Team	2018			
17	Dinmukhamed Karaman	(Kazakhstan)	MF	26 June 2000 (age 26)	Youth Team	2019		12	0
21	Jovan Čađenović	(Montenegro)	MF	13 January 1995 (age 31)	Sūduva	2020		20	1
30	Baūyrzhan Baytana	(Kazakhstan)	MF	6 May 1992 (age 34)		2020			
40	Goran Brkić	(Serbia)	MF	28 April 1991 (age 35)	Olimpija Ljubljana	2020		18	1
95	Ayub Batsuyev	(Russia)	MF	9 February 1997 (age 29)	Akhmat Grozny	2020		7	1
Forwards
10	Alisher Suley	(Kazakhstan)	FW	1 November 1995 (age 31)	Ordabasy	2018			
13	Bratislav Punoševac	(Serbia)	FW	9 July 1987 (age 39)	Kaisar	2020		12	0
15	Toni Silva	(Guinea-Bissau)	FW	15 September 1993 (age 33)	Astra Giurgiu	2020		17	4
19	Abylayhan Zhumabek	(Kazakhstan)	FW	19 October 2001 (age 25)	Youth Team	2019		8	1
28	Bauyrzhan Turysbek	(Kazakhstan)	FW	15 October 1991 (age 35)	Shakhter Karagandy	2020		14	3
33	Serge Nyuiadzi	(Togo)	FW	17 September 1991 (age 35)	Caspiy	2020		43	11
Players away on loan
Players that left during the season
70	Nils Zatl	(Austria)	FW	3 April 1992 (age 34)	Doxa Katokopias	2020		2	1

== Transfers ==
=== In ===
Date	Position	Nationality	Name	From	Fee	Ref.
Winter 2020	GK	(Kazakhstan)	Dzhurakhon Babakhanov	Okzhetpes	Undisclosed	
Winter 2020	DF	(Kazakhstan)	Dmitry Evstingeyev	Makhtaaral	Undisclosed	
Winter 2020	MF	(Kazakhstan)	Adilet Abdenaby	Makhtaaral	Undisclosed	
22 January 2020	MF	(Lithuania)	Ovidijus Verbickas	Sūduva	Undisclosed	
22 January 2020	MF	(Montenegro)	Jovan Čađenović	Sūduva	Undisclosed	
22 January 2020	FW	(Serbia)	Bratislav Punoševac		Free	
29 January 2020	DF	(Belarus)	Valery Karshakevich	Mordovia Saransk	Undisclosed	
29 January 2020	MF	(Russia)	Ayub Batsuyev	Akhmat Grozny	Undisclosed	
29 January 2020	FW	(Montenegro)	Dejan Boljević	Budućnost Podgorica	Undisclosed	
10 February 2020	FW	(Austria)	Nils Zatl	Doxa Katokopias	Undisclosed	
17 February 2020	FW	(Guinea-Bissau)	Toni Silva	Astra Giurgiu	Undisclosed	
18 February 2020	DF	(Russia)	Mikhail Mishchenko	Torpedo-BelAZ Zhodino	Undisclosed	
24 February 2020	MF	(Serbia)	Goran Brkić	Olimpija Ljubljana	Undisclosed	
10 August 2020	MF	(Kazakhstan)	Baūyrzhan Baytana		Free	
10 August 2020	FW	(Kazakhstan)	Bauyrzhan Turysbek	Shakhter Karagandy	Undisclosed	
10 August 2020	FW	(Togo)	Serge Nyuiadzi	Caspiy	Undisclosed	

=== Released ===
Date	Position	Nationality	Name	Joined	Date	Ref.
10 August 2020	FW	(Austria)	Nils Zatl	Floridsdorfer AC	20 August 2020	

== Friendlies ==
2020	–
(UTC+6)

== Competitions ==
=== Premier League ===
==== Results summary ====
Overall								Home						Away					
Pld	W	D	L	GF	GA	GD	Pts	W	D	L	GF	GA	GD	W	D	L	GF	GA	GD
20	5	8	7	19	23	−4	23	3	3	4	11	14	−3	2	5	3	8	9	−1

Last updated: 30 November 2020.
Source: See Results

==== Results by round ====
Round	1	2	3	4	5	6	7	8	9	10	11	12	13	14	15	16	17	18	19	20	21	22
Ground	A	H	A	H	-	H	A	A	H	A	H	A	H	A	-	A	H	H	A	H	A	H
Result	L	W	D	D	-	L	D	D	L	W	D	D	D	L	-	D	W	L	W	L	L	W
Position	7	7	7	7	-	8	9	8	8	8	8	8	8	8	-	9	8	8	8	8	9	8

Source: See Results
A = Away; H = Home; W = Win; D = Draw; L = Loss

==== Results ====
7 March 2020 1	Kairat	2 – 1	Taraz	Almaty
15:00 (UTC+6)	Góralski (yellow card) 19'; Wrzesiński 24'; Aimbetov 83'	Report	Zatl 29'	Stadium: Central Stadium; Attendance: 2,400; Referee: Denis Tevyashov

15 March 2020 2	Taraz	3 – 2	Ordabasy	Taraz
16:00 (UTC+6)	Simčević 4' (o.g.); Kleshchenko 33' (o.g.); A.Taubay 47'; Mishchenko (yellow card) 57' (red card) 68'; Silva (yellow card) 74'; D.Babakhanov (yellow card) 84'	Report	Diakate 55' (pen.), 69' (pen.); Simčević (yellow card) 81'; Fontanello (yellow card) 90'	Stadium: Central Stadium; Attendance: 0 Referee: Aleksandr Gauzer
Note: Match played behind closed doors due to the COVID-19 pandemic.

1 July 2020 3	Kaisar	1 – 1	Taraz	Kyzylorda
20:00 (UTC+6)	Narzildaev 41'; B.Kairov (yellow card) 48'; Reginaldo (yellow card) 60'	Report	Silva 49'; A.Taubay (yellow card) 58'	Stadium: Gani Muratbayev Stadium; Attendance: 0 Referee: Ruslan Omarov
Note: Match originally scheduled for 21 March, but postponed on 16 March due to the COVID-19 pandemic.

18 August 2020 4	Taraz	0 – 0	Kyzylzhar	Almaty
21:00 (UTC+6)	Nyuiadzi (yellow card) 76'	Report	Delić (yellow card) 60'	Stadium: Jas Qyran Stadium; Attendance: 0 Referee: Ruslan Omarov
Note: Match originally scheduled for 3 April and then 4 July, but postponed twice due to the COVID-19 pandemic. Match played at the Jas Qyran stadium in Almaty, instead of Taraz's regular Central Stadium in Taraz. Match played behind closed doors due to the COVID-19 pandemic.

26 August 2020 6	Taraz	2 – 3	Okzhetpes	Almaty
18:00 (UTC+6)	Turysbek 26' (pen.), 88'; Boljević (yellow card) 41'	Report	S.Zhumakhanov 47'; Gian 74'; M.Tuliev (yellow card) 81'; Obradović 89'	Stadium: Stadïon Akademïï T.S.Segïzbaeva; Attendance: 0 Referee: Daniyar Sakhi
Note: Match played at the Stadïon Akademïï T.S.Segïzbaeva in Almaty, instead of Taraz's regular Central Stadium in Taraz. Match played behind closed doors due to the COVID-19 pandemic.

30 August 2020 7	Astana	1 – 1	Taraz	Almaty
18:00 (UTC+6)	Rotariu 4'; Barseghyan (yellow card) 40'; Postnikov (yellow card) 72'	Report	Verbickas (yellow card) 10'; Boljević (yellow card) 27'; Silva 48'	Stadium: T.S.Segïzbaeva Academy Stadium; Attendance: 0 Referee: Sergey Gorokhovodatskiy
Note: Match played at the T.S.Segïzbaeva Academy Stadium in Almaty, instead of Astana's regular Astana Arena in Nur-Sultan. Match played behind closed doors due to the COVID-19 pandemic.

11 September 2020 8	Shakhter Karagandy	1 – 1	Taraz	Almaty
21:00 (UTC+6)	Buyvolov (yellow card) 49'; Zenjov (yellow card) 68'; Usman 90+2'	Report	Karshakevich 50'; D.Babakhanov (yellow card) 85'	Stadium: Jas Qyran Stadium; Attendance: 0 Referee: Furkat Atajanow
Note: Match played at the Jas Qyran Stadium in Almaty, instead of Shakhter Karagandy's regular Shakhter Stadium in Karaganda. Match played behind closed doors due to the COVID-19 pandemic.

19 September 2020 9	Taraz	0 – 2	Zhetysu	Talgar
16:00 (UTC+6)	D.Babakhanov (yellow card) 14'; Turysbek (yellow card) 36'; A.Suley (yellow card) 38'; Batsuyev (yellow card) 79'; Punoševac (yellow card) 85'	Report	Eugénio 14' (pen.); Shkodra (yellow card) 26' (goal) 41' (pen.); Kerimzhanov (yellow card) 34'; Naumov (yellow card) 89'	Stadium: UTB Talgar; Attendance: 0 Referee: Arman Ismuratov
Note: Match played at the UTB Talgar stadium in Talgar, instead of Taraz's regular Central Stadium in Taraz. Match played behind closed doors due to the COVID-19 pandemic.

23 September 2020 10	Caspiy	0 – 2	Taraz	Almaty
15:00 (UTC+6)	Adams (yellow card) 35'; Sebaihi (yellow card) 43'	Report	B.Shadmanov (yellow card) 32'; Čađenović 43' (yellow card) 52'; M.Amirkhanov (yellow card) 46'; Silva 58'; Verbickas (yellow card) 77'	Stadium: Jas Qyran Stadium; Attendance: 0 Referee: Zhandos Abzhan
Note: Match played at the Jas Qyran Stadium in Almaty, instead of Caspiy's regular Zhastar Stadium in Aktau. Match played behind closed doors due to the COVID-19 pandemic.

26 September 2020 11	Taraz	0 – 0	Tobol	Almaty
16:00 (UTC+6)	Nyuiadzi (yellow card) 22'; Silva (yellow card) 44'	Report	Yerlanov (yellow card) 50'	Stadium: Stadïon Akademïï T.S.Segïzbaeva; Attendance: 0 Referee: Bolat Saryev
Note: Match played at the Stadïon Akademïï T.S.Segïzbaeva in Almaty, instead of Taraz's regular Central Stadium in Taraz. Match played behind closed doors due to the COVID-19 pandemic.

2 October 2020 12	Ordabasy	1 – 1	Taraz	Talgar
15:45 (UTC+6)	Dosmagambetov (yellow card) 37'; Dmitrenko 77' (yellow card) 89'	Report	Brkić (yellow card) 28' (goal) 56'; Karshakevich (yellow card) 36'; Silva (yellow card) 41'; B.Shadmanov (yellow card) 64'; Punoševac (yellow card) 72'	Stadium: UTB Talgar; Attendance: 0 Referee: Aydin Rakhimbayev
Note: Match played at the UTB Talgar stadium in Talgar, instead of Ordabasy's regular Kazhymukan Munaitpasov Stadium in Shymkent. Match played behind closed doors due to the COVID-19 pandemic.

17 October 2020 13	Taraz	2 – 2	Kaisar	Talgar
15:00 (UTC+6)	Nyuiadzi (yellow card) 21' (goal) 25'; Turysbek 23'; M.Amirkhanov (yellow card) 40'	Report	Reginaldo (yellow card) 38'; Lobjanidze 61', 82' (yellow card) 85'	Stadium: UTB Talgar; Attendance: 0 Referee: Sergey Gorokhovodatskiy
Note: Match played at the UTB Talgar stadium in Talgar, instead of Taraz's regular Central Stadium in Taraz. Match played behind closed doors due to the COVID-19 pandemic.

21 October 2020 14	Kyzylzhar	1 – 0	Taraz	Almaty
14:00 (UTC+6)	Delić (yellow card) 37'; Ceesay 68'; T.Muldinov (yellow card) 90+2'	Report	B.Aitbayev (yellow card) 22'; Nyuiadzi (yellow card) 38'; Čađenović (yellow card) 45+1'; M.Amirkhanov (yellow card) 80'; D.Babakhanov (yellow card) 90+5'	Stadium: T.S.Segïzbaeva Academy Stadium; Attendance: 0 Referee: Timur Kumashev
Note: Match played at the T.S.Segïzbaeva Academy Stadium in Almaty, instead of Kyzylzhar's regular Karasai Stadium in Petropavl. Match played behind closed doors due to the COVID-19 pandemic.

31 October 2020 16	Okzhetpes	0 – 0	Taraz	Talgar
14:00 (UTC+6)	Dimov (yellow card) 37'; S.Zhumakhanov (yellow card) 63'	Report	Brkić (yellow card) 63'; B.Aitbayev (yellow card) 90+2'	Stadium: UTB Talgar; Attendance: 0 Referee: Daniyar Sakhi
Note: Match played at the UTB Talgar stadium in Talgar, instead of Okzhetpes's regular Okzhetpes Stadium in Kokshetau. Match played behind closed doors due to the COVID-19 pandemic.

4 November 2020 17	Taraz	1 – 0	Astana	Almaty
17:00 (UTC+6)	Nyuiadzi 32' (yellow card) 65'; Turysbek (yellow card) 87'	Report		Stadium: Jas Qyran Stadium; Attendance: 0 Referee: Igor Chesnokov
Note: Match played at the Jas Qyran Stadium in Almaty, instead of Taraz's regular Central Stadium in Taraz. Match played behind closed doors due to the COVID-19 pandemic.

8 November 2020 18	Taraz	2 – 4	Shakhter Karagandy	Talgar
15:00 (UTC+6)	Nyuiadzi (red card) 3'; Brkić (yellow card) 3'; D.Evstingeyev (yellow card) 67'; A.Suley (yellow card) 69'; A.Zhumabek 73'; Silva 74'	Report	Khubulov 3' (pen.), 28'; Seisen 40' (o.g.); Zenjov (yellow card) 50'; Mingazow 58' (yellow card) 76'; Tkachuk (yellow card) 62'; Baah (yellow card) 90+3'	Stadium: UTB Talgar; Attendance: 0 Referee: Furkat Atajanov
Note: Match played at the UTB Talgar stadium in Talgar, instead of Taraz's regular Central Stadium in Taraz. Match played behind closed doors due to the COVID-19 pandemic.

21 November 2020 19	Zhetysu	0 – 1	Taraz	Talgar
14:00 (UTC+6)	Mawutor (yellow card) 64'; Žulpa (yellow card) 72'; Toshev (yellow card) 84'; Adamović (yellow card) 90+1'	Report	D.Evstingeyev (yellow card) 9'; Boljević 28'; M.Amirkhanov (yellow card) 44'	Stadium: UTB Talgar; Attendance: 0 Referee: Sergey Gorokhovodatskiy
Note: Match played at the UTB Talgar stadium in Talgar, instead of Zhetysu's regular Zhetysu Stadium in Taldıqorğan. Match played behind closed doors due to the COVID-19 pandemic.

24 November 2020 20	Taraz	0 – 1	Caspiy	Almaty
14:00 (UTC+6)	Karshakevich (yellow card) 62'; Silva (yellow card) 65'; B.Shadmanov (yellow card) 87'	Report	A.Nusip 45+1'; Marusych (yellow card) 68'; Shakhmetov (yellow card) 75'; A.Nabikhanov (yellow card) 87'; R.Zhanysbaev (yellow card) 90+2'	Stadium: Stadïon Akademïï T.S.Segïzbaeva; Attendance: 0 Referee: Denis Tevyashov
Note: Match played at the Stadïon Akademïï T.S.Segïzbaeva in Almaty, instead of Taraz's regular Central Stadium in Taraz. Match played behind closed doors due to the COVID-19 pandemic.

27 November 2020 21	Tobol	2 – 0	Taraz	Almaty
18:00 (UTC+6)	Muzhikov (yellow card) 11'; Nurgaliev 27' (pen.); S.Zharynbetov (yellow card) 58'; Manzorro (yellow card) 64'; Amanović (yellow card) 74'; Murtazayev 82'	Report	B.Shadmanov (yellow card) 24'; M.Amirkhanov (red card) 25'; Batsuyev (yellow card) 83'	Stadium: Jas Qyran Stadium; Attendance: 0 Referee: Bolat Saryev
Note: Match played at the Jas Qyran Stadium in Almaty, instead of Tobol's regular Central Stadium in Kostanay. Match played behind closed doors due to the COVID-19 pandemic.

30 November 2020 22	Taraz	1 – 0	Kairat	Almaty
18:00 (UTC+6)	Batsuyev 62'; Brkić (yellow card) 69'; Silva (yellow card) 69'	Report	A.Adakhadzhiev (yellow card) 15'; S.Astanov (yellow card) 30'; Abiken (yellow card) 90'	Stadium: Jas Qyran Stadium; Attendance: 0 Referee: Denis Izmailov
Note: Match played at the Jas Qyran Stadium in Almaty, instead of Taraz's regular Central Stadium in Taraz. Match played behind closed doors due to the COVID-19 pandemic.

==== League table ====
Pos	Team	Pld	W	D	L	GF	GA	GD	Pts
6	Zhetysu	20	9	1	10	27	28	−1	28
7	Kaisar	20	6	6	8	20	23	−3	24
8	Taraz	20	5	8	7	19	23	−4	23
9	Kyzylzhar	20	6	5	9	15	24	−9	23
10	Caspiy	20	5	2	13	15	34	−19	17

Source: UEFA, Soccerway
Rules for classification: 1) Points; 2) Goal difference; 3) Matches won; 4) Goals scored; 5) Away goals scored; 6) Head-to-head points; 7) Head-to-head matches won; 8) Head-to-head goal difference; 9) Head-to-head goals scored; 10) Head-to-head away goals scored; 11) Draw.

=== Kazakhstan Cup ===
July 2020 Last 16	–
(UTC+6)

== Squad statistics ==
As of match played 30 November 2020

=== Appearances and goals ===
No.	Pos	Nat	Player	Total		Premier League		Kazakhstan Cup	
No.	Pos	Nat	Player	Apps	Goals	Apps	Goals	Apps	Goals
1	GK	(Kazakhstan) KAZ	Almas Khamytbekov	1	0	1	0	0	0
4	DF	(Kazakhstan) KAZ	Bekzat Shadmanov	16	0	13+3	0	0	0
5	DF	(Belarus) BLR	Valery Karshakevich	20	1	20	1	0	0
7	MF	(Kazakhstan) KAZ	Abzal Taubay	13	1	6+7	1	0	0
8	MF	(Kazakhstan) KAZ	Sheykhislam Kulakhmetov	1	0	0+1	0	0	0
9	MF	(Lithuania) LTU	Ovidijus Verbickas	14	0	11+3	0	0	0
10	FW	(Kazakhstan) KAZ	Alisher Suley	18	0	15+3	0	0	0
13	FW	(Serbia) SRB	Bratislav Punoševac	12	0	2+10	0	0	0
14	DF	(Kazakhstan) KAZ	Berik Aitbayev	17	0	13+4	0	0	0
15	FW	(Guinea-Bissau) GBS	Toni Silva	17	4	13+4	4	0	0
17	MF	(Kazakhstan) KAZ	Dinmukhamed Karaman	1	0	0+1	0	0	0
19	FW	(Kazakhstan) KAZ	Abylayhan Zhumabek	5	1	0+5	1	0	0
20	DF	(Kazakhstan) KAZ	Maksat Amirkhanov	18	0	18	0	0	0
21	MF	(Montenegro) MNE	Jovan Čađenović	20	1	20	1	0	0
22	DF	(Kazakhstan) KAZ	Madiyar Nuraly	1	0	1	0	0	0
23	DF	(Montenegro) MNE	Dejan Boljević	18	1	14+4	1	0	0
24	GK	(Kazakhstan) KAZ	Dzhurakhon Babakhanov	9	0	9	0	0	0
25	DF	(Russia) RUS	Mikhail Mishchenko	5	0	3+2	0	0	0
27	DF	(Kazakhstan) KAZ	Dmitry Evstingeyev	5	0	3+2	0	0	0
28	FW	(Kazakhstan) KAZ	Bauyrzhan Turysbek	14	3	10+4	3	0	0
30	MF	(Kazakhstan) KAZ	Baūyrzhan Baytana	7	0	4+3	0	0	0
33	FW	(Togo) TOG	Serge Nyuiadzi	13	2	12+1	2	0	0
40	MF	(Serbia) SRB	Goran Brkić	18	1	17+1	1	0	0
74	GK	(Kazakhstan) KAZ	Mukhammejan Seisen	10	0	10	0	0	0
95	MF	(Russia) RUS	Ayub Batsuyev	7	1	1+6	1	0	0
Players away from Taraz on loan:
Players who left Taraz during the season:
70	FW	(Austria) AUT	Nils Zatl	2	1	2	1	0	0

=== Goal scorers ===
Place	Position	Nation	Number	Name	Premier League	Kazakhstan Cup	Total
1	FW	(Guinea-Bissau)	15	Toni Silva	4	0	4
2	FW	(Kazakhstan)	28	Bauyrzhan Turysbek	3	0	3
3	FW	(Togo)	33	Serge Nyuiadzi	2	0	2
3				Own goal	2	0	2
5	FW	(Austria)	70	Nils Zatl	1	0	1
5	MF	(Kazakhstan)	7	Abzal Taubay	1	0	1
5	DF	(Belarus)	5	Valery Karshakevich	1	0	1
5	MF	(Montenegro)	21	Jovan Čađenović	1	0	1
5	MF	(Serbia)	40	Goran Brkić	1	0	1
5	FW	(Kazakhstan)	19	Abylayhan Zhumabek	1	0	1
5	DF	(Montenegro)	23	Dejan Boljević	1	0	1
5	DF	(Russia)	95	Ayub Batsuyev	1	0	1
				TOTALS	19	0	19

=== Clean sheet ===
Place	Position	Nation	Number	Name	Premier League	Kazakhstan Cup	Total
1	GK	(Kazakhstan)	74	Mukhammejan Seisen	5	0	5
2	GK	(Kazakhstan)	24	Dzhurakhon Babakhanov	2	0	2
				TOTALS	7	0	7

=== Disciplinary record ===
Number	Nation	Position	Name	Premier League		Kazakhstan Cup		Total	
Number	Nation	Position	Name	Yellow card	Red card	Yellow card	Red card	Yellow card	Red card
4	(Kazakhstan)	DF	Bekzat Shadmanov	4	0	0	0	4	0
5	(Belarus)	DF	Valery Karshakevich	2	0	0	0	2	0
7	(Kazakhstan)	MF	Abzal Taubay	1	0	0	0	1	0
9	(Lithuania)	MF	Ovidijus Verbickas	2	0	0	0	2	0
10	(Kazakhstan)	FW	Alisher Suley	2	0	0	0	2	0
14	(Kazakhstan)	DF	Berik Aitbayev	2	0	0	0	2	0
13	(Serbia)	FW	Bratislav Punoševac	2	0	0	0	2	0
15	(Guinea-Bissau)	FW	Toni Silva	5	0	0	0	5	0
20	(Kazakhstan)	DF	Maksat Amirkhanov	4	1	0	0	4	1
21	(Montenegro)	MF	Jovan Čađenović	2	0	0	0	2	0
23	(Montenegro)	DF	Dejan Boljević	2	0	0	0	2	0
24	(Kazakhstan)	GK	Dzhurakhon Babakhanov	4	0	0	0	4	0
25	(Russia)	DF	Mikhail Mishchenko	1	1	0	0	1	1
27	(Kazakhstan)	DF	Dmitry Evstingeyev	2	0	0	0	2	0
28	(Kazakhstan)	FW	Bauyrzhan Turysbek	2	0	0	0	2	0
33	(Togo)	FW	Serge Nyuiadzi	5	1	0	0	5	1
40	(Serbia)	MF	Goran Brkić	4	0	0	0	4	0
95	(Russia)	MF	Ayub Batsuyev	2	0	0	0	2	0
Players away on loan:
Players who left Taraz during the season:
			TOTALS	46	3	0	0	46	3
