= 2020 FC Caspiy season =

FC Caspiy
2020 season
- Manager: Srđan Blagojević
- Stadium: Karasai Stadium
- Premier League: 10th
- Kazakhstan Cup: Canceled due to the COVID-19 pandemic
- Top goalscorer: League: Billal Sebaihi (4); All: Billal Sebaihi (4)
Home colours	Away colours

The 2020 FC Caspiy season was Caspiy's first season back in the Kazakhstan Premier League, the highest tier of association football in Kazakhstan, since 2001. Caspiy will also take part in the Kazakhstan Cup.

== Season events ==
On 13 March, the Football Federation of Kazakhstan announced all league fixtures would be played behind closed doors for the foreseeable future due to the COVID-19 pandemic. On 16 March the Football Federation of Kazakhstan suspended all football until 15 April.

On 26 June, it was announced that the league would resume on 1 July, with no fans being permitted to watch the games. The league was suspended for a second time on 3 July, for an initial two weeks, due to an increase in COVID-19 cases in the country.

On 23 July, Sultan Sagnayev and Ramazan Karimov had their season-long loan deals ended prematurely and they returned to Astana.

== Squad ==
As of match played 30 November 2020

No.	Name	Nationality	Position	Date of birth (age)	Signed from	Signed in	Contract ends	Apps.	Goals
Goalkeepers
1	Nurlybek Ayazbaev	(Kazakhstan)	GK	24 January 1991 (aged 29)	Zhetysu	2020		1	0
35	Olzhas Mukhanov	(Kazakhstan)	GK	27 October 1997 (aged 23)	Bayterek	2018			
51	Denis Kavlinov	(Russia)	GK	10 January 1995 (aged 25)	Gomel	2020		1	0
91	Marko Milošević	(Serbia)	GK	7 February 1991 (aged 29)	Napredak Kruševac	2020		19	0
Defenders
2	Timur Redzhepov	(Kazakhstan)	DF	6 July 2002 (aged 18)	Academy	2020		1	0
3	Rafkat Aslan	(Kazakhstan)	MF	2 February 1994 (aged 26)	Irtysh Pavlodar	2020		11	0
4	Erlan Kadyrbaev	(Kazakhstan)	DF	5 October 1991 (aged 29)	Youth Team	2013			
5	Mikhail Gabyshev	(Kazakhstan)	DF	2 January 1990 (aged 30)	Atyrau	2020			
6	Rakhimzhan Rozybakiev	(Kazakhstan)	DF	2 January 1991 (aged 29)	Taraz	2020		10	0
17	Ruslan Zhanysbaev	(Kazakhstan)	DF	4 November 1995 (aged 25)	Atyrau	2020			
33	Ilya Vorotnikov	(Kazakhstan)	DF	1 February 1986 (aged 34)	Taraz	2019			
55	Layonel Adams	(Russia)	DF	9 August 1994 (aged 26)	Isloch Minsk Raion	2020		15	0
Midfielders
7	Bekzat Kabylan	(Kazakhstan)	MF	3 March 1996 (aged 24)	Youth Team	2016			
8	Stefan Bukorac	(Serbia)	MF	15 February 1991 (aged 29)	Torpedo-BelAZ Zhodino	2020		18	1
11	Yerkebulan Nurgaliyev	(Kazakhstan)	MF	12 September 1993 (aged 27)	Shakhter Karagandy	2020		12	0
12	Kuandyk Nursultanov	(Kazakhstan)	MF	24 April 1999 (aged 21)	Academy	2020		1	0
13	Ruslan Sakhalbaev	(Kazakhstan)	MF	27 June 1984 (aged 36)	Okzhetpes	2019			
14	Maksym Marusych	(Ukraine)	MF	17 July 1993 (aged 27)	Jelgava	2020		10	1
18	Kirill Shestakov	(Kazakhstan)	MF	19 June 1985 (aged 35)		2020		1	0
19	Maksat Taykenov	(Kazakhstan)	MF	14 August 1997 (aged 23)	Bayterek	2017			
22	Marat Shakhmetov	(Kazakhstan)	MF	6 February 1989 (aged 31)	loan from Shakhter Karagandy	2020		16	1
23	Amandyk Nabikhanov	(Kazakhstan)	MF	9 November 1997 (aged 23)	Youth Team	2017			
30	Billal Sebaihi	(France)	MF	31 May 1992 (aged 28)	Boluspor	2020		18	4
37	Vladislav Sirotov	(Russia)	MF	27 October 1991 (aged 29)	Tekstilshchik Ivanovo	2020		10	0
47	Arman Nusip	(Kazakhstan)	MF	22 January 1994 (aged 26)	Irtysh Pavlodar	2020		16	1
	Bagdaulet Konlimkos	(Kazakhstan)	MF	5 December 2002 (aged 17)	Academy	2020		2	0
Forwards
10	Almas Armenov	(Kazakhstan)	FW	27 January 1992 (aged 28)	Okzhetpes	2019			
97	Branko Čubrilo	(Croatia)	FW	20 May 1988 (aged 32)		2020			
Players away on loan
Left during the season
3	Bojan Kovačević	(Serbia)	DF	28 April 1996 (aged 24)	loan from Proleter Novi Sad	2020		1	0
9	Aydos Tattybaev	(Kazakhstan)	FW	26 April 1990 (aged 30)	Taraz	2019			
11	Aleksandar Stanisavljević	(Serbia)	MF	11 June 1989 (aged 31)	Voždovac	2020		1	1
14	Taras Bondarenko	(Ukraine)	DF	23 September 1992 (aged 28)	Radnički Niš	2020		3	1
26	Erkin Tapalov	(Kazakhstan)	MF	3 September 1993 (aged 27)	Zhetysu	2020		2	0
44	Serge Nyuiadzi	(Togo)	FW	17 September 1991 (aged 29)	Taraz	2020		2	0
70	Sultan Sagnayev	(Kazakhstan)	MF	14 January 2000 (aged 20)	loan from Astana	2020		2	0
81	Ramazan Karimov	(Kazakhstan)	FW	5 July 1999 (aged 21)	loan from Astana	2020		2	0

== Transfers ==
=== Winter ===
In: Note: Flags indicate national team as defined under FIFA eligibility rules; some limited exceptions apply. Players may hold more than one non-FIFA nationality.

No.	Pos.	Nation	Player
1	GK	KAZ	Nurlybek Ayazbaev (from (Kazakhstan) Zhetysu)
3	DF	SRB	Bojan Kovačević (loan from (Serbia) Proleter Novi Sad)
5	DF	KAZ	Mikhail Gabyshev (from (Kazakhstan) Atyrau)
6	DF	KAZ	Rakhymzhan Rozybakiev (from (Kazakhstan) Taraz)
8	MF	SRB	Stefan Bukorac (from (Belarus) Torpedo-BelAZ Zhodino)
11	MF	SRB	Aleksandar Stanisavljević (from (Serbia) Voždovac)
14	MF	UKR	Taras Bondarenko (from (Serbia) Radnički Niš)
22	MF	KAZ	Marat Shakhmetov (on loan from (Kazakhstan) Shakhter Karagandy)
26	MF	KAZ	Erkin Tapalov (from (Kazakhstan) Zhetysu)
37	MF	RUS	Vladislav Sirotov (from (Russia) Tekstilshchik Ivanovo)
44	MF	TOG	Serge Nyuiadzi (from (Kazakhstan) Taraz)
51	GK	RUS	Denis Kavlinov (from (Belarus) Gomel)
55	DF	RUS	Layonel Adams (from (Belarus) Isloch Minsk Raion)
70	MF	KAZ	Sultan Sagnayev (on loan from (Kazakhstan) Astana)
81	FW	KAZ	Ramazan Karimov (on loan from (Kazakhstan) Astana)
91	GK	SRB	Marko Milošević (from (Serbia) Napredak Kruševac)

Out: Note: Flags indicate national team as defined under FIFA eligibility rules; some limited exceptions apply. Players may hold more than one non-FIFA nationality.

No.	Pos.	Nation	Player
—	GK	KAZ	Danil Podymksy (loan return to (Kazakhstan) Astana)
—	DF	BIH	Saša Kolunija
—	DF	KAZ	Talgat Kusyapov (loan return to (Kazakhstan) Astana)
—	MF	KAZ	Kazbek Geteriev (to (Russia) Kyzyltash Bakhchisaray)
—	MF	KAZ	Ruslan Sakhalbaev
—	FW	CRO	Branko Čubrilo
—	FW	KAZ	Kuanysh Begalin (to (Kazakhstan) Ekibastuz)
—	FW	KAZ	Zhandos Soltan (to (Kazakhstan) Altai Semey)

=== Summer ===
In: Note: Flags indicate national team as defined under FIFA eligibility rules; some limited exceptions apply. Players may hold more than one non-FIFA nationality.

No.	Pos.	Nation	Player
3	DF	KAZ	Rafkat Aslan (from (Kazakhstan) Irtysh Pavlodar)
11	MF	KAZ	Yerkebulan Nurgaliyev (from (Kazakhstan) Shakhter Karagandy)
14	MF	UKR	Maksym Marusych
47	MF	KAZ	Arman Nusip (from (Kazakhstan) Irtysh Pavlodar)
97	FW	CRO	Branko Čubrilo
—	MF	KAZ	Kirill Shestakov

Out: Note: Flags indicate national team as defined under FIFA eligibility rules; some limited exceptions apply. Players may hold more than one non-FIFA nationality.

No.	Pos.	Nation	Player
3	DF	SRB	Bojan Kovačević (loan return to (Serbia) Proleter Novi Sad)
9	FW	KAZ	Aydos Tattybaev (to (Kazakhstan) Shakhter Karagandy)
11	MF	SRB	Aleksandar Stanisavljević (to (Kazakhstan) Kaisar)
14	DF	UKR	Taras Bondarenko (to (Kazakhstan) Okzhetpes)
20	DF	KAZ	Karam Sultanov (to (Azerbaijan) Sumgayit)
26	MF	KAZ	Erkin Tapalov (to (Kazakhstan) Shakhter Karagandy)
44	FW	TOG	Serge Nyuiadzi (to (Kazakhstan) Taraz)
70	MF	KAZ	Sultan Sagnayev (loan return to (Kazakhstan) Astana)
81	FW	KAZ	Ramazan Karimov (loan return to (Kazakhstan) Astana)

=== Released ===
Date	Position	Nationality	Name	Joined	Date	Ref.
31 December 2021	GK	(Russia)	Denis Kavlinov	Zhetysu	29 January 2021	
31 December 2021	DF	(Kazakhstan)	Rafkat Aslan	Zhetysu		
31 December 2021	DF	(Kazakhstan)	Mikhail Gabyshev	Shakhter Karagandy	28 January 2021	
31 December 2021	DF	(Kazakhstan)	Erlan Kadyrbaev			
31 December 2021	DF	(Kazakhstan)	Rakhimzhan Rozybakiev			
31 December 2021	DF	(Russia)	Layonel Adams	Turan	16 February 2021	
31 December 2021	MF	(France)	Billal Sebaihi	Hermannstadt	15 February 2021	
31 December 2021	MF	(Kazakhstan)	Yerkebulan Nurgaliyev	Aktobe		
31 December 2021	MF	(Kazakhstan)	Kirill Shestakov			
31 December 2021	MF	(Russia)	Vladislav Sirotov			
31 December 2021	MF	(Ukraine)	Maksym Marusych	Noah Jūrmala		
31 December 2021	FW	(Croatia)	Branko Čubrilo	Kaštel Gomilica		

== Competitions ==
=== Premier League ===
==== Results summary ====
Overall								Home						Away					
Pld	W	D	L	GF	GA	GD	Pts	W	D	L	GF	GA	GD	W	D	L	GF	GA	GD
20	5	2	13	15	34	−19	17	2	1	7	7	19	−12	3	1	6	8	15	−7

Last updated: 30 November 2020.
Source: See Results

==== Results by round ====
Round	1	2	3	4	5	6	7	8	9	10	11	12	13	14	15	16	17	18	19	20	21	22
Ground	H	H	A	H	A	H	A	-	A	H	A	A	H	A	H	A	H	-	H	A	H	A
Result	L	L	L	L	L	W	L	-	D	L	L	W	L	L	L	W	D	-	W	W	L	L
Position	11	11	11	10	10	10	11	-	11	11	11	10	11	11	11	11	10	-	10	10	10	10

Source: See Results
A = Away; H = Home; W = Win; D = Draw; L = Loss

==== Results ====
8 March 2020 1	Caspiy	0 – 2	Zhetysu	Aktau
17:00 (UTC+6)	Adams (yellow card) 52'; Bondarenko (yellow card) 77'	Report	Toshev 66'; Shkodra (yellow card) 77'; Živković (yellow card) 82'; Zubovich 83'	Stadium: Zhastar Stadium; Attendance: 3,200; Referee: Saken Bayimbet

15 March 2020 2	Caspiy	2 – 3	Astana	Aktau
17:00 (UTC+6)	A.Tattybaev (yellow card) 30'; B.Kovačević (yellow card) 52'; Sirotov (yellow card) 55'; Shakhmetov (yellow card) 55'; Stanisavljević 63'; A.Nabikhanov (yellow card) 67'; Bondarenko 90+2'	Report	Sigurjónsson 16'; Barseghyan 18'; Logvinenko 41'; Malyi (yellow card) 74'; Sotiriou (yellow card) 84'	Stadium: Zhastar Stadium; Attendance: 0 Referee: Furkhat Atazhanov
Note: Match played behind closed doors due to the COVID-19 pandemic.

1 July 2020 3	Tobol	2 – 0	Caspiy	Kostanay
18:00 (UTC+6)	Nurgaliev 85'; Omirtayev 89'	Report		Stadium: Central Stadium; Attendance: 0 Referee: Bakhyt Kyzylbaev
Note: Match originally scheduled for 20 March, but postponed on 16 March due to the COVID-19 pandemic.

18 August 2020 4	Caspiy	0 – 3	Kairat	Talgar
17:00 (UTC+6)	A.Nabikhanov (yellow card) 52'; Shakhmetov (yellow card) 57'; Adams (yellow card) 87'	Report	Alip 8', 52'; Mikanović (yellow card) 75'; A.Shushenachev 80'	Stadium: UTB Talgar; Attendance: 0 Referee: Denis Tevyashov
Note: Match originally scheduled for 3 April and then 4 July, but postponed twice due to the COVID-19 pandemic. Match played at the UTB Talgar stadium in Talgar, instead of Caspiy's regular Zhastar Stadium in Aktau. Match played behind closed doors due to the COVID-19 pandemic.

21 August 2020 5	Ordabasy	1 – 0	Caspiy	Almaty
17:00 (UTC+6)	João Paulo 44'; Mehanović (yellow card) 82'; B.Shayzada (yellow card) 90+3'	Report	A.Nabikhanov (yellow card) 5'; Sebaihi (yellow card) 54'; R.Rozybakiev (yellow card) 67'; Čubrilo (yellow card) 74'	Stadium: Stadïon Akademïï T.S.Segïzbaeva; Attendance: 0 Referee: Bagdat Abdullaev
Note: Match originally scheduled for 11 April and then 10 July, but postponed twice due to the COVID-19 pandemic. Match played at the Stadïon Akademïï T.S.Segïzbaeva in Almaty, instead of Ordabasy's regular Kazhymukan Munaitpasov Stadium in Shymkent. Match played behind closed doors due to the COVID-19 pandemic.

26 August 2020 6	Caspiy	1 – 0	Kaisar	Almaty
21:00 (UTC+6)	Čubrilo (yellow card) 2'; M.Taykenov (yellow card) 25'; Nurgaliyev (yellow card) 45+2'; Bukorac (yellow card) 47' (goal) 65'; R.Aslan (yellow card) 90+2'; Milošević (yellow card) 90+3'	Report	Narzildaev (yellow card) 14'; Tagybergen (yellow card) 44'; B.Kairov (yellow card) 70'; Bitang (yellow card) 90+5'	Stadium: Jas Qyran Stadium; Attendance: 0 Referee: Sergey Gorokhovodatskiy
Note: Match played at the Jas Qyran Stadium in Almaty, instead of Caspiy's regular Zhastar Stadium in Aktau. Match played behind closed doors due to the COVID-19 pandemic.

30 August 2020 7	Kyzylzhar	1 – 0	Caspiy	Almaty
21:00 (UTC+6)	Drachenko 6' (yellow card) 70'; B.Shaikhov (yellow card) 13'; Lobantsev (yellow card) 90+4'	Report	A.Nabikhanov (yellow card) 26'; Čubrilo (yellow card) 62'; Sebaihi (yellow card) 64'; Adams (yellow card) 83'	Stadium: Jas Qyran Stadium; Attendance: 0 Referee: Askhat Abdanbayev
Note: Match played at the Jas Qyran Stadium in Almaty, instead of Kyzylzhar's regular Karasai Stadium in Petropavl. Match played behind closed doors due to the COVID-19 pandemic.

18 September 2020 8	Okzhetpes	2 – 2	Caspiy	Almaty
21:00 (UTC+6)	Gian (yellow card) 12'; Chertov (yellow card) 26'; Bondarenko 33'; M.Tuliev (yellow card) 43'; Zorić 75'	Report	Bukorac (yellow card) 8'; Sebaihi 26' (pen.), 83' (pen.) (yellow card) 39'; Čubrilo (yellow card) 42' (yellow-red card) 49'; Vorotnikov (yellow card) 75'; Milošević (yellow card) 90+4'	Stadium: Jas Qyran Stadium; Attendance: 0 Referee: Bolat Saryev
Note: Match played at the Jas Qyran Stadium in Almaty, instead of Okzhetpes's regular Okzhetpes Stadium in Kokshetau. Match played behind closed doors due to the COVID-19 pandemic.

23 September 2020 10	Caspiy	0 – 2	Taraz	Almaty
15:00 (UTC+6)	Adams (yellow card) 35'; Sebaihi (yellow card) 43'	Report	B.Shadmanov (yellow card) 32'; Čađenović 43' (yellow card) 52'; M.Amirkhanov (yellow card) 46'; Silva 58'; Verbickas (yellow card) 77'	Stadium: Jas Qyran Stadium; Attendance: 0 Referee: Zhandos Abzhan
Note: Match played at the Jas Qyran Stadium in Almaty, instead of Caspiy's regular Zhastar Stadium in Aktau. Match played behind closed doors due to the COVID-19 pandemic.

28 September 2020 11	Shakhter Karagandy	2 – 1	Caspiy	Almaty
17:00 (UTC+6)	Baah 11' (yellow card) 51'; Khubulov (yellow card) 23'; Lamanje (yellow card) 45'; Tkachuk 87'	Report	R.Sakhalbaev (yellow card) 60'; B.Kabylan 82'	Stadium: Jas Qyran Stadium; Attendance: 0 Referee: Georgiy Chekhovskiy
Note: Match played at the Jas Qyran Stadium in Almaty, instead of Shakhter Karagandy's regular Shakhter Stadium in Karaganda. Match played behind closed doors due to the COVID-19 pandemic.

1 October 2020 12	Astana	1 – 2	Caspiy	Talgar
15:45 (UTC+6)	Sotiriou (yellow card) 7'; Sigurjónsson 37'; Postnikov (yellow card) 76'	Report	M.Gabyshev (yellow card) 26'; Adams (yellow card) 37'; Sebaihi 71'; Marusych 75'; Milošević (yellow card) 90+3'	Stadium: UTB Talgar Stadium; Attendance: 0 Referee: Denis Izmailov
Note: Match played at the UTB Talgar Stadium in Talgar, instead of Astana's regular Astana Arena in Nur-Sultan. Match played behind closed doors due to the COVID-19 pandemic.

18 October 2020 13	Caspiy	0 – 1	Tobol	Almaty
19:30 (UTC+6)	Adams (yellow card) 10'; M.Gabyshev (yellow card) 69'; Sebaihi (yellow card) 74'; Shakhmetov (yellow card) 77'	Report	Malyi 71'; Abilgazy (yellow card) 90'	Stadium: Central Stadium; Attendance: 0 Referee: Aydin Rakhimbayev
Note: Match played at the Central Stadium in Almaty, instead of Caspiy's regular Karasai Stadium in Petropavl. Match played behind closed doors due to the COVID-19 pandemic.

22 October 2020 14	Kairat	3 – 1	Caspiy	Almaty
19:00 (UTC+6)	Palyakow (yellow card) 23'; Eseola 32'; Adams 40' (o.g.); Vágner Love 80'	Report	Shakhmetov 14' (yellow card) 18'; Bukorac (yellow card) 35'; R.Aslan (yellow card) 58'; Adams (yellow card) 71'	Stadium: Central Stadium; Attendance: 0 Referee: Daniyar Sakhi
Note: Match played behind closed doors due to the COVID-19 pandemic.

26 October 2020 15	Caspiy	1 – 2	Ordabasy	Almaty
18:00 (UTC+6)	R.Sakhalbaev 23'; A.Nabikhanov (yellow card) 28'; Nurgaliyev (yellow card) 57'	Report	João Paulo 50', 61' (yellow card) 64'; Brígido (yellow card) 57'	Stadium: Jas Qyran Stadium; Attendance: 0 Referee: Saken Bayimbet
Note: Match played at the Jas Qyran Stadium in Almaty, instead of Caspiy's regular Karasai Stadium in Petropavl. Match played behind closed doors due to the COVID-19 pandemic.

30 October 2020 16	Kaisar	0 – 1	Caspiy	Almaty
19:00 (UTC+6)	Fedin (yellow card) 33'; B.Kairov (yellow card) 45'; Graf (yellow card) 81'	Report	Sebaihi (yellow card) 39'; Bukorac (yellow card) 45'; Adams (yellow card) 75'; M.Gabyshev 77'; Čubrilo (yellow card) 79'	Stadium: Central Stadium; Attendance: 0 Referee: Aydin Rakhimbayev
Note: Match played at the Central Stadium in Almaty, instead of Kaisar's regular Gani Muratbayev Stadium in Kyzylorda. Match played behind closed doors due to the COVID-19 pandemic.

4 November 2020 17	Caspiy	1 – 1	Kyzylzhar	Talgar
15:00 (UTC+6)	R.Rozybakiev (yellow card) 13'; Shakhmetov (yellow card) 45+2'; A.Nabikhanov 69'	Report	Grigalashvili 7'; Drachenko (yellow card) 34'; I.Aitov (yellow card) 42'	Stadium: UTB Talgar; Attendance: 0 Referee: Anatolyi Vishnichenko
Note: Match played at the Central Stadium in Almaty, instead of Caspiy's regular Karasai Stadium in Petropavl. Match played behind closed doors due to the COVID-19 pandemic.

21 November 2020 19	Caspiy	2 – 1	Okzhetpes	Almaty
18:00 (UTC+6)	Bukorac (yellow card) 5'; R.Sakhalbaev 12'; Sebaihi 78' (pen.); Shakhmetov (yellow card) 88'; Čubrilo (yellow card) 90+4'	Report	Dmitrijev (yellow card) 51' (goal) 83'; R.Abzhanov (yellow card) 76'; Stojanović (yellow card) 86'; Gian (yellow card) 88'	Stadium: Jas Qyran Stadium; Attendance: 0 Referee: Artyom Kuchin
Note: Match played at the Jas Qyran Stadium in Almaty, instead of Caspiy's regular Zhastar Stadium in Aktau. Match played behind closed doors due to the COVID-19 pandemic.

24 November 2020 20	Taraz	0 – 1	Caspiy	Almaty
14:00 (UTC+6)	Karshakevich (yellow card) 62'; Silva (yellow card) 65'; B.Shadmanov (yellow card) 87'	Report	A.Nusip 45+1'; Marusych (yellow card) 68'; Shakhmetov (yellow card) 75'; A.Nabikhanov (yellow card) 87'; R.Zhanysbaev (yellow card) 90+2'	Stadium: Stadïon Akademïï T.S.Segïzbaeva; Attendance: 0 Referee: Denis Tevyashov
Note: Match played at the Stadïon Akademïï T.S.Segïzbaeva in Almaty, instead of Taraz's regular Central Stadium in Taraz. Match played behind closed doors due to the COVID-19 pandemic.

27 November 2020 21	Caspiy	0 – 4	Shakhter Karagandy	Almaty
14:00 (UTC+6)	R.Rozybakiev (yellow card) 29'; R.Aslan (yellow card) 49'; R.Zhanysbaev (red card) 90+3'	Report	Khubulov 18', 38'; A.Tattybaev 26'; Usman (yellow card) 36'; E.Tapalov (yellow card) 42'; Buyvolov (yellow card) 60'; Z.Payruz 90'; Bakayev (yellow card) 90+3'	Stadium: Stadïon Akademïï T.S.Segïzbaeva; Attendance: 0 Referee: Furkat Atajanov
Note: Match played at the Stadïon Akademïï T.S.Segïzbaeva in Almaty, instead of Caspiy's regular Karasai Stadium in Petropavl. Match played behind closed doors due to the COVID-19 pandemic.

30 November 2020 22	Zhetysu	3 – 0	Caspiy	Almaty
18:00 (UTC+6)	Zhaksylykov 23', 58'; Pobudey 33'; Zubovich (yellow card) 50'	Report	Shestakov (yellow card) 53'	Stadium: Central Stadium; Attendance: 0 Referee: Igor Chesnokov
Note: Match played at the Central Stadium in Almaty, instead of Zhetysu's regular Zhetysu Stadium in Taldıqorğan. Match played behind closed doors due to the COVID-19 pandemic.

==== League table ====
Pos	Team	Pld	W	D	L	GF	GA	GD	Pts	Qualification or relegation
8	Taraz	20	5	8	7	19	23	−4	23	
9	Kyzylzhar	20	6	5	9	15	24	−9	23	
10	Caspiy	20	5	2	13	15	34	−19	17	
11	Okzhetpes (R)	20	2	5	13	16	38	−22	11	Relegation to the Kazakhstan First Division
12	Irtysh Pavlodar (D, R)	0	0	0	0	0	0	0	0	Withdrawn, relegated to the Kazakhstan First Division

Source: UEFA, Soccerway
Rules for classification: 1) Points; 2) Goal difference; 3) Matches won; 4) Goals scored; 5) Away goals scored; 6) Head-to-head points; 7) Head-to-head matches won; 8) Head-to-head goal difference; 9) Head-to-head goals scored; 10) Head-to-head away goals scored; 11) Draw.
(D) Disqualified; (R) Relegated

=== Kazakhstan Cup ===
July 2020 Last 16	–
(UTC+6)

== Squad statistics ==
As of match played 30 November 2020

=== Appearances and goals ===
No.	Pos	Nat	Player	Total		Premier League		Kazakhstan Cup	
No.	Pos	Nat	Player	Apps	Goals	Apps	Goals	Apps	Goals
1	GK	(Kazakhstan) KAZ	Nurlybek Ayazbaev	1	0	0+1	0	0	0
2	DF	(Kazakhstan) KAZ	Timur Redzhepov	1	0	0+1	0	0	0
3	DF	(Kazakhstan) KAZ	Rafkat Aslan	11	0	4+7	0	0	0
4	DF	(Kazakhstan) KAZ	Erlan Kadyrbaev	2	0	1+1	0	0	0
5	DF	(Kazakhstan) KAZ	Mikhail Gabyshev	15	1	14+1	1	0	0
6	DF	(Kazakhstan) KAZ	Rakhimzhan Rozybakiev	10	0	5+5	0	0	0
7	MF	(Kazakhstan) KAZ	Bekzat Kabylan	8	1	3+5	1	0	0
8	MF	(Serbia) SRB	Stefan Bukorac	18	1	17+1	1	0	0
10	MF	(Kazakhstan) KAZ	Almas Armenov	10	0	1+9	0	0	0
11	MF	(Kazakhstan) KAZ	Yerkebulan Nurgaliyev	12	0	9+3	0	0	0
12	MF	(Kazakhstan) KAZ	Kuandyk Nursultanov	1	0	0+1	0	0	0
13	MF	(Kazakhstan) KAZ	Ruslan Sakhalbaev	16	2	14+2	2	0	0
14	MF	(Ukraine) UKR	Maksym Marusych	10	1	9+1	1	0	0
17	DF	(Kazakhstan) KAZ	Ruslan Zhanysbaev	12	0	2+10	0	0	0
18	MF	(Kazakhstan) KAZ	Kirill Shestakov	1	0	1	0	0	0
19	MF	(Kazakhstan) KAZ	Maksat Taykenov	17	0	17	0	0	0
22	MF	(Kazakhstan) KAZ	Marat Shakhmetov	16	1	12+4	1	0	0
23	MF	(Kazakhstan) KAZ	Amandyk Nabikhanov	18	1	11+7	1	0	0
30	MF	(France) FRA	Billal Sebaihi	18	4	18	4	0	0
33	DF	(Kazakhstan) KAZ	Ilya Vorotnikov	12	0	12	0	0	0
37	MF	(Russia) RUS	Vladislav Sirotov	10	0	8+2	0	0	0
47	MF	(Kazakhstan) KAZ	Arman Nusip	16	1	10+6	1	0	0
51	GK	(Russia) RUS	Denis Kavlinov	1	0	1	0	0	0
55	DF	(Russia) RUS	Layonel Adams	15	0	14+1	0	0	0
91	GK	(Serbia) SRB	Marko Milošević	19	0	19	0	0	0
97	FW	(Croatia) CRO	Branko Čubrilo	15	0	6+9	0	0	0
	MF	(Kazakhstan) KAZ	Bagdaulet Konlimkos	1	0	0+1	0	0	0
Players away from Caspiy on loan:
Players who left Caspiy during the season:
3	DF	(Serbia) SRB	Bojan Kovačević	1	0	1	0	0	0
9	FW	(Kazakhstan) KAZ	Aydos Tattybaev	3	0	3	0	0	0
11	MF	(Serbia) SRB	Aleksandar Stanisavljević	1	1	1	1	0	0
14	DF	(Ukraine) UKR	Taras Bondarenko	3	1	3	1	0	0
26	MF	(Kazakhstan) KAZ	Erkin Tapalov	2	0	2	0	0	0
44	FW	(Togo) TOG	Serge Nyuiadzi	2	0	2	0	0	0
70	MF	(Kazakhstan) KAZ	Sultan Sagnayev	2	0	1+1	0	0	0
81	FW	(Kazakhstan) KAZ	Ramazan Karimov	2	0	1+1	0	0	0

=== Goal scorers ===
Place	Position	Nation	Number	Name	Premier League	Kazakhstan Cup	Total
1	MF	(France)	30	Billal Sebaihi	4	0	4
2	MF	(Kazakhstan)	13	Ruslan Sakhalbaev	2	0	2
3	MF	(Serbia)	11	Aleksandar Stanisavljević	1	0	1
3	DF	(Ukraine)	14	Taras Bondarenko	1	0	1
3	DF	(Serbia)	8	Stefan Bukorac	1	0	1
3	MF	(Kazakhstan)	7	Bekzat Kabylan	1	0	1
3	MF	(Ukraine)	14	Maksym Marusych	1	0	1
3	MF	(Kazakhstan)	22	Marat Shakhmetov	1	0	1
3	DF	(Kazakhstan)	5	Mikhail Gabyshev	1	0	1
3	MF	(Kazakhstan)	23	Amandyk Nabikhanov	1	0	1
3	MF	(Kazakhstan)	47	Arman Nusip	1	0	1
				TOTALS	15	0	15

=== Clean sheet ===
Place	Position	Nation	Number	Name	Premier League	Kazakhstan Cup	Total
1	GK	(Serbia)	91	Marko Milošević	2	0	2
				TOTALS	2	0	2

=== Disciplinary record ===
Number	Nation	Position	Name	Premier League		Kazakhstan Cup		Total	
Number	Nation	Position	Name	Yellow card	Red card	Yellow card	Red card	Yellow card	Red card
3	(Kazakhstan)	DF	Rafkat Aslan	3	0	0	0	3	0
5	(Kazakhstan)	DF	Mikhail Gabyshev	3	0	0	0	3	0
6	(Kazakhstan)	DF	Rakhimzhan Rozybakiev	2	0	0	0	2	0
8	(Serbia)	MF	Stefan Bukorac	5	0	0	0	5	0
11	(Kazakhstan)	MF	Yerkebulan Nurgaliyev	2	0	0	0	2	0
13	(Kazakhstan)	MF	Ruslan Sakhalbaev	1	0	0	0	1	0
14	(Ukraine)	MF	Maksym Marusych	1	0	0	0	1	0
17	(Kazakhstan)	DF	Ruslan Zhanysbaev	1	1	0	0	1	1
18	(Kazakhstan)	MF	Kirill Shestakov	1	0	0	0	1	0
19	(Kazakhstan)	MF	Maksat Taykenov	1	0	0	0	1	0
22	(Kazakhstan)	MF	Marat Shakhmetov	6	0	0	0	6	0
23	(Kazakhstan)	MF	Amandyk Nabikhanov	5	0	0	0	5	0
30	(France)	MF	Billal Sebaihi	6	0	0	0	6	0
33	(Kazakhstan)	DF	Ilya Vorotnikov	1	0	0	0	1	0
37	(Russia)	MF	Vladislav Sirotov	1	0	0	0	1	0
55	(Russia)	DF	Layonel Adams	7	0	0	0	7	0
91	(Serbia)	GK	Marko Milošević	3	0	0	0	3	0
97	(Croatia)	FW	Branko Čubrilo	7	1	0	0	7	1
Players who left Caspiy during the season:
3	(Serbia)	DF	Bojan Kovačević	1	0	0	0	1	0
9	(Kazakhstan)	FW	Aydos Tattybaev	1	0	0	0	1	0
14	(Ukraine)	DF	Taras Bondarenko	1	0	0	0	1	0
			TOTALS	59	2	0	0	59	2
