= 2020 FC Okzhetpes season =

FC Okzhetpes
2020 season
- Chairman: Zheksenbai Kusainov
- Manager: Andrei Karpovich
- Stadium: Okzhetpes Stadium
- Kazakhstan Premier League: 11th
- Kazakhstan Cup: Canceled due to the COVID-19 pandemic
- Top goalscorer: League: Artjom Dmitrijev (5); All: Artjom Dmitrijev (5)
Home colours	Away colours

The 2020 FC Okzhetpes season was the club's second season back in the Kazakhstan Premier League following their relegation at the end of the 2017 season, and 29th season in total.

== Season events ==
On 13 March, the Football Federation of Kazakhstan announced all league fixtures would be played behind closed doors for the foreseeable future due to the COVID-19 pandemic. On 16 March the Football Federation of Kazakhstan suspended all football until 15 April.

On 30 May, the Professional Football League of Kazakhstan announced that Irtysh Pavlodar had withdrawn from the league due to financial issues, with all their matches being excluded from the league results.

On 26 July, it was announced that the league would resume on 1 July, with no fans being permitted to watch the games. The league was suspended for a second time on 3 July, for an initial two weeks, due to an increase in COVID-19 cases in the country.

=== Contracts ===
On 13 January, Okzhetpes extended the contracts with Milan Stojanović, Darko Zorić, Plamen Dimov and Artjom Dmitrijev until the end of the 2020 season.

On 14 January, Okzhetpes extended the contracts with goalkeepers Ruslan Abzhanov and Yaroslav Baginsky until the end of the 2020 season.

On 27 January, Okzhetpes extended the contracts with Sanat Zhumakhanov, Ilya Kalinin and Altynbek Saparov until the end of the 2020 season.

== Squad ==
As of match played 30 November 2020

No.	Name	Nationality	Position	Date of birth (age)	Signed from	Signed in	Contract ends	Apps.	Goals
Goalkeepers
1	Aleksandr Sheplyakov	(Russia)	GK	13 August 1996 (aged 24)	Dynamo Moscow	2020		5	0
31	Ruslan Abzhanov	(Kazakhstan)	GK	28 April 1990 (aged 30)	Aksu	2008	2020		
35	Yaroslav Baginsky	(Kazakhstan)	GK	3 October 1987 (aged 33)	Shakhter Karagandy	2018	2020		
Defenders
3	Talgat Kusyapov	(Kazakhstan)	DF	14 February 1999 (aged 21)	Astana	2020	2020	3	0
4	Alyaksey Hawrylovich	(Belarus)	DF	5 January 1990 (aged 30)	Dinamo Minsk	2020	2020	16	0
5	Daniil Chertov	(Russia)	DF	15 November 1990 (aged 30)		2020	2020	71	3
7	Aliyu Abubakar	(Nigeria)	DF	15 June 1996 (aged 24)	Shakhter Karagandy	2020		11	0
14	Taras Bondarenko	(Ukraine)	DF	23 September 1992 (aged 28)	Caspiy	2020		16	2
15	Dmitry Shmidt	(Kazakhstan)	DF	17 November 1993 (aged 27)	Irtysh Pavlodar	2020		11	0
18	Timur Zhakupov	(Kazakhstan)	DF	9 June 1995 (aged 25)					
21	Plamen Dimov	(Bulgaria)	DF	29 October 1990 (aged 30)	Cherno More	2019	2020	33	1
	Niyaz Idrisov	(Kazakhstan)	DF	21 July 1999 (aged 21)	Youth Team	2018			
Midfielders
6	Miras Tuliev	(Kazakhstan)	MF	30 August 1994 (aged 26)	Irtysh Pavlodar	2018			
8	Artjom Dmitrijev	(Estonia)	MF	14 November 1988 (aged 32)	Lahti	2019	2020	47	10
10	Altynbek Saparov	(Kazakhstan)	MF	26 April 1995 (aged 25)	Atyrau	2019	2020	32	1
11	Magomed-Emi Dzhabrailov	(Russia)	MF	24 March 1993 (aged 27)	Fakel Voronezh	2020		6	0
19	Azat Ersalimov	(Kazakhstan)	MF	19 July 1988 (aged 32)	Akzhayik	2019		37	0
23	Evgeny Ashikhmin	(Kazakhstan)	MF	12 December 1998 (aged 21)	Youth Team				
24	Milan Stojanović	(Serbia)	MF	10 May 1988 (aged 32)	Radnik Surdulica	2019	2020	48	8
28	Darko Zorić	(Montenegro)	MF	12 September 1993 (aged 27)	Čukarički	2019	2020	43	6
77	Ilya Kalinin	(Kazakhstan)	MF	3 February 1992 (aged 28)	Irtysh Pavlodar	2019	2020	34	0
88	Gian	(Brazil)	MF	2 April 1993 (aged 27)	Taraz	2020	2020	19	1
99	Vsevolod Nihaev	(Moldova)	MF	4 May 1999 (aged 21)	Dinamo-Auto Tiraspol	2020		6	0
Forwards
9	Islamnur Abdulavov	(Russia)	FW	7 March 1994 (aged 26)	Atyrau	2020		10	0
17	Zhasulan Moldakaraev	(Kazakhstan)	FW	7 May 1987 (aged 33)	Ordabasy	2019		77	12
30	Sanat Zhumakhanov	(Kazakhstan)	FW	30 January 1988 (aged 32)	Ordabasy	2018	2020		
55	Adil Battalov	(Kazakhstan)	FW	16 October 1999 (aged 21)	Youth Team	2020		0	0
69	Arman Tolegenov	(Kazakhstan)	FW	18 April 2000 (aged 20)	Youth Team	2020		3	0
91	Marko Obradović	(Montenegro)	FW	30 June 1991 (aged 29)	Torpedo-BelAZ Zhodino	2020	2020	10	2
Players away on loan
Left during the season
22	Andriy Mischenko	(Ukraine)	DF	7 April 1991 (aged 29)	SKA-Khabarovsk	2020		3	0

== Transfers ==
=== In ===
Date	Position	Nationality	Name	From	Fee	Ref.
Winter 2020	GK	(Russia)	Aleksandr Sheplyakov	Dynamo Moscow	Undisclosed	
Winter 2020	FW	(Russia)	Islamnur Abdulavov	Atyrau	Undisclosed	
17 January 2020	DF	(Belarus)	Alyaksey Hawrylovich	Dinamo Minsk	Undisclosed	
27 January 2020	MF	(Brazil)	Gian	Taraz	Undisclosed	
29 January 2020	DF	(Russia)	Daniil Chertov		Free	
1 February 2020	DF	(Kazakhstan)	Talgat Kusyapov	Astana	Undisclosed	
6 February 2020	FW	(Montenegro)	Marko Obradović	Torpedo-BelAZ Zhodino	Undisclosed	
20 February 2020	DF	(Ukraine)	Andriy Mischenko	SKA-Khabarovsk	Undisclosed	
12 March 2020	MF	(Moldova)	Vsevolod Nihaev	Dinamo-Auto Tiraspol	Undisclosed	
15 October 2020	MF	(Russia)	Magomed-Emi Dzhabrailov	Unattached	Free	

=== Released ===
Date	Position	Nationality	Name	Joined	Date
Summer 2020	DF	(Kazakhstan)	Niyaz Idrisov		
27 July 2020	DF	(Ukraine)	Andriy Mischenko		

== Friendlies ==
11 January 2020	Okzhetpes (Kazakhstan)	1 – 3	(Hungary) MTK Budapest	Belek, Turkey
(UTC+6)	Zorić	Report	Goal

15 January 2020	Okzhetpes (Kazakhstan)	1 – 1	(Romania) Voluntari	Belek, Turkey
(UTC+6)	Stojanović (pen.)	Report	Goal

19 January 2020	Okzhetpes (Kazakhstan)	1 – 2	(Russia) Baltika Kaliningrad	Belek, Turkey
(UTC+6)	A.Saparov	Report	Goal

30 January 2020	Okzhetpes (Kazakhstan)	2 – 2	(Bulgaria) Cherno More Varna	Belek, Turkey
19:00 (UTC+6)		Report

3 February 2020	Okzhetpes (Kazakhstan)	0 – 0	(Bulgaria) Slavia Sofia	Belek, Turkey
(UTC+6)		Report

== Competitions ==
=== Premier League ===
==== Results summary ====
Overall								Home						Away					
Pld	W	D	L	GF	GA	GD	Pts	W	D	L	GF	GA	GD	W	D	L	GF	GA	GD
20	2	5	13	16	38	−22	11	1	4	5	10	19	−9	1	1	8	6	19	−13

Last updated: 30 November 2020.
Source: See Results

==== Results by round ====
Round	1	2	3	4	5	6	7	8	9	10	11	12	13	14	15	16	17	18	19	20	21	22
Ground	A	A	H	A	-	A	A	H	A	H	A	H	A	H	-	H	H	A	H	A	H	H
Result	L	L	L	L	-	L	W	D	L	D	L	D	D	W	-	L	D	L	L	L	L	L
Position	9	12	12	12	-	11	11	10	10	10	10	10	10	10	-	10	10	11	11	11	11	11

Source: See Results
A = Away; H = Home; W = Win; D = Draw; L = Loss

==== Results ====
7 March 2020 1	Ordabasy	1 – 0	Okzhetpes	Shymkent
15:00 (UTC+6)	Brígido 57'	Report	Dmitrijev (yellow card) 53'	Stadium: Namys Stadium; Attendance: 3,800; Referee: Denis Izmailov

11 March 2020 21	Kairat	5 – 0	Okzhetpes	Almaty
16:00 (UTC+6)	Alip 17' (pen.); Aimbetov 25', 51'; A.Shushenachev (penalty missed) 57' 57'; Abiken 66'	Report	Gian (yellow card) 5'; Stojanović (yellow card) 9'; Dimov (yellow card) 16'; Mischenko (red card) 45+1'	Stadium: Central Stadium; Attendance: 1,400; Referee: Zhandos Abzhan
Note: Match was originally scheduled for 2 August 2020.

15 March 2020 2	Okzhetpes	0 – 1	Kaisar	Kokshetau
15:00 (UTC+6)	S.Zhumakhanov (yellow card) 36'; Zorić (yellow card) 57'; Gian (yellow card) 59'	Report	Lobjanidze 10' (yellow card) 14'; Pešić (yellow card) 50'; Bitang (yellow card) 61'; B.Kairov (yellow card) 68'	Stadium: Okzhetpes Stadium; Attendance: 0 Referee: Bolat Saryev

1 July 2020 3	Kyzylzhar	3 – 1	Okzhetpes	Petropavl
18:00 (UTC+6)	Drachenko (yellow card) 42'; Enache 44'; Dimov 76'; A.Sokolenko (yellow card) 81'; T.Muldinov 87'	Report	Moldakaraev 28'; Chertov (yellow card) 84'	Stadium: Karasai Stadium; Attendance: 0 Referee: Arman Ismuratov
Note: Match originally scheduled for 21 March, but postponed on 16 March due to the COVID-19 pandemic.

4 July 2020 4	Okzhetpes	–	Irtysh Pavlodar	Kokshetau
(UTC+6)				Stadium: Okzhetpes Stadium
Note: Match originally scheduled for 3 April, but postponed on 16 March due to the COVID-19 pandemic. Match cancelled on 30 May with Irtysh Pavlodar's expulsion from the league.

22 August 2020 5	Astana	2 – 0	Okzhetpes	Talgar
16:00 (UTC+6)	Sigurjónsson 45+3' (pen.); Zhalmukan 81'; Zhakypbayev (yellow card) 90+2'	Report	Obradović (yellow card) 43'; R.Abzhanov (yellow card) 45+2'; Dimov (yellow card) 48'; T.Zhakupov (yellow card) 63'; D.Shmidt (yellow card) 74'	Stadium: UTB Talgar Stadium; Attendance: 0 Referee: Aydin Rakhimbayev
Note: Match originally scheduled for 11 April and then 11 July, but postponed twice due to the COVID-19 pandemic. Match played at the UTB Talgar stadium in Talgar, instead of Astana's regular Astana Arena in Nur-Sultan. Match played behind closed doors due to the COVID-19 pandemic.

26 August 2020 6	Taraz	2 – 3	Okzhetpes	Almaty
18:00 (UTC+6)	Turysbek 26' (pen.), 88'; Boljević (yellow card) 41'	Report	S.Zhumakhanov 47'; Gian 74'; M.Tuliev (yellow card) 81'; Obradović 89'	Stadium: Stadïon Akademïï T.S.Segïzbaeva; Attendance: 0 Referee: Daniyar Sakhi
Note: Match played at the Stadïon Akademïï T.S.Segïzbaeva in Almaty, instead of Taraz's regular Central Stadium in Taraz. Match played behind closed doors due to the COVID-19 pandemic.

29 August 2020 7	Okzhetpes	1 – 1	Shakhter Karagandy	Almaty
21:00 (UTC+6)	M.Tuliev (yellow card) 36'; Obradović (yellow card) 70' (goal) 87'; Moldakaraev (yellow card) 85'	Report	Baah 27'	Stadium: Jas Qyran Stadium; Attendance: 0 Referee: Ruslan Omarov
Note: Match played at the Jas Qyran Stadium in Almaty, instead of Okzhetpes's regular Okzhetpes Stadium in Kokshetau. Match played behind closed doors due to the COVID-19 pandemic.

11 September 2020 8	Zhetysu	1 – 0	Okzhetpes	Talgar
16:00 (UTC+6)	Kerimzhanov 44'; Shkodra (yellow card) 85'	Report	Obradović (yellow card) 64'; A.Saparov (yellow card) 84'	Stadium: UTB Talgar Stadium; Attendance: 0 Referee: Aleksandr Gauzer
Note: Match played at the UTB Talgar Stadium in Talgar, instead of Zhetysu's regular Zhetysu Stadium in Taldıqorğan. Match played behind closed doors due to the COVID-19 pandemic.

18 September 2020 9	Okzhetpes	2 – 2	Caspiy	Almaty
21:00 (UTC+6)	Gian (yellow card) 12'; Chertov (yellow card) 26'; Bondarenko 33'; M.Tuliev (yellow card) 43'; Zorić 75'	Report	Bukorac (yellow card) 8'; Sebaihi 26' (pen.), 83' (pen.) (yellow card) 39'; Čubrilo (yellow card) 42' (yellow-red card) 49'; Vorotnikov (yellow card) 75'; Milošević (yellow card) 90+4'	Stadium: Jas Qyran Stadium; Attendance: 0 Referee: Bolat Saryev
Note: Match played at the Jas Qyran Stadium in Almaty, instead of Okzhetpes's regular Okzhetpes Stadium in Kokshetau. Match played behind closed doors due to the COVID-19 pandemic.

22 September 2020 10	Tobol	1 – 0	Okzhetpes	Talgar
15:30 (UTC+6)	Fonseca (yellow card) 21'; Malyi (yellow card) 33'; Manzorro 65'	Report	Obradović (yellow card) 35'; Hawrylovich (yellow card) 68'; T.Zhakupov (yellow card) 79'; S.Zhumakhanov (yellow card) 89'	Stadium: UTB Talgar Stadium; Attendance: 0 Referee: Furkat Atajanov
Note: Match played at the UTB Talgar Stadium in Talgar, instead of Tobol's regular Central Stadium in Kostanay. Match played behind closed doors due to the COVID-19 pandemic.

27 September 2020 11	Okzhetpes	3 – 3	Kairat	Talgar
16:00 (UTC+6)	Dimov 6' (yellow card) 85'; S.Zhumakhanov (yellow card) 27'; D.Shmidt (yellow card) 45'; Dmitrijev 45+2', 57'; Abubakar (yellow card) 90+1'	Report	Góralski (yellow card) 20'; Kosović 28'; Aimbetov 38'; Abiken (yellow card) 58'; Vágner Love 73'	Stadium: UTB Talgar; Attendance: 0 Referee: Aleksandr Gauzer
Note: Match played at the UTB Talgar stadium in Talgar, instead of Okzhetpes's regular Okzhetpes Stadium in Kokshetau. Match played behind closed doors due to the COVID-19 pandemic.

2 October 2020 12	Kaisar	0 – 0	Okzhetpes	Almaty
13:30 (UTC+6)	Bitang (yellow card) 13'; Gorman (yellow card) 72'; Narzildaev (yellow card) 74'; I.Amirseitov (yellow card) 79' (yellow-red card) 88'	Report	Dmitrijev (yellow card) 81'	Stadium: T.S.Segïzbaeva Academy Stadium; Attendance: 0 Referee: Denis Tevyashov
Note: Match played at the T.S.Segïzbaeva Academy Stadium in Almaty, instead of Kaisar's regular Gani Muratbayev Stadium in Kyzylorda. Match played behind closed doors due to the COVID-19 pandemic.

17 October 2020 13	Okzhetpes	2 – 1	Kyzylzhar	Almaty
13:00 (UTC+6)	Dmitrijev 54' (pen.); Zorić 68'	Report	T.Muldinov (yellow card) 11'; Drachenko (yellow card) 24'; Grigalashvili 43'; Koné (yellow card) 90'	Stadium: Jas Qyran Stadium; Attendance: 0 Referee: Denis Izmailov
Note: Match played at the Jas Qyran Stadium in Almaty, instead of Okzhetpes's regular Okzhetpes Stadium in Kokshetau. Match played behind closed doors due to the COVID-19 pandemic.

26 October 2020 15	Okzhetpes	1 – 5	Astana	Almaty
20:30 (UTC+6)	Moldakaraev (yellow card) 34'; Dmitrijev 55'; Hawrylovich (yellow card) 78'	Report	Logvinenko (yellow card) 4'; Barseghyan 10', 28' (yellow card) 34'; Tomasov 40'; Shchotkin 50', 86'; Beisebekov (yellow card) 54'	Stadium: Central Stadium; Attendance: 0 Referee: Bolat Saryev
Note: Match played at the Central Stadium in Almaty, instead of Okzhetpes's regular Okzhetpes Stadium in Kokshetau. Match played behind closed doors due to the COVID-19 pandemic.

31 October 2020 16	Okzhetpes	0 – 0	Taraz	Talgar
14:00 (UTC+6)	Dimov (yellow card) 37'; S.Zhumakhanov (yellow card) 63'	Report	Brkić (yellow card) 63'; B.Aitbayev (yellow card) 90+2'	Stadium: UTB Talgar; Attendance: 0 Referee: Daniyar Sakhi
Note: Match played at the UTB Talgar stadium in Talgar, instead of Okzhetpes's regular Okzhetpes Stadium in Kokshetau. Match played behind closed doors due to the COVID-19 pandemic.

4 November 2020 17	Shakhter Karagandy	2 – 1	Okzhetpes	Almaty
13:00 (UTC+6)	Baah (yellow card) 40'; Zenjov 49', 57'; Tkachuk (yellow card) 73'; Takulov (yellow card) 81'; Usman (yellow card) 90+2'; Z.Payruz (yellow card) 90+3'	Report	Dmitrijev (yellow card) 27'; Stojanović 40'	Stadium: T.S.Segïzbaeva Academy Stadium; Attendance: 0 Referee: Timur Kumashev
Note: Match played at the T.S.Segïzbaeva Academy Stadium in Almaty, instead of Shakhter Karagandy's regular Shakhter Stadium in Karaganda. Match played behind closed doors due to the COVID-19 pandemic.

8 November 2020 18	Okzhetpes	0 – 1	Zhetysu	Almaty
17:00 (UTC+6)	S.Zhumakhanov (yellow card) 25'; Hawrylovich (yellow card) 60' (yellow-red card) 86'; Moldakaraev (yellow card) 74'; Dimov (yellow card) 81'	Report	Adamović 21'; A.Shabanov (yellow card) 24'; Y.Kybyray (yellow card) 43'; Shkodra (yellow card) 47'; Kuantayev (yellow card) 90+2'; Pobudey (yellow card) 90+5'	Stadium: Jas Qyran Stadium; Attendance: 0 Referee: Aydin Rakhimbayev
Note: Match played at the Jas Qyran Stadium in Almaty, instead of Okzhetpes's regular Okzhetpes Stadium in Kokshetau. Match played behind closed doors due to the COVID-19 pandemic.

21 November 2020 19	Caspiy	2 – 1	Okzhetpes	Almaty
18:00 (UTC+6)	Bukorac (yellow card) 5'; R.Sakhalbaev 12'; Sebaihi 78' (pen.); Shakhmetov (yellow card) 88'; Čubrilo (yellow card) 90+4'	Report	Dmitrijev (yellow card) 51' (goal) 83'; R.Abzhanov (yellow card) 76'; Stojanović (yellow card) 86'; Gian (yellow card) 88'	Stadium: Jas Qyran Stadium; Attendance: 0 Referee: Artyom Kuchin
Note: Match played at the Jas Qyran Stadium in Almaty, instead of Caspiy's regular Zhastar Stadium in Aktau. Match played behind closed doors due to the COVID-19 pandemic.

24 November 2020 20	Okzhetpes	0 – 2	Tobol	Almaty
18:00 (UTC+6)	S.Zhumakhanov (yellow card) 41' (yellow-red card) 90+2'; M-E.Dzhabrailov (yellow card) 56'	Report	Manzorro 38'; Abilgazy (yellow card) 56' (goal) 59'	Stadium: Jas Qyran Stadium; Attendance: 0 Referee: Igor Chesnokov
Note: Match played at the Jas Qyran Stadium in Almaty, instead of Okzhetpes's regular Okzhetpes Stadium in Kokshetau. Match played behind closed doors due to the COVID-19 pandemic.

30 November 2020 22	Okzhetpes	1 – 3	Ordabasy	Almaty
13:00 (UTC+6)	A.Saparov (yellow card) 21'; Bondarenko 39'; T.Zhakupov (yellow card) 62'; N.Idrisov (yellow card) 78'; Abubakar (red card) 87'	Report	Khizhnichenko 4'; Dmitrenko (yellow card) 36'; Badibanga (yellow card) 41' (goal) 56'; João Paulo (yellow card) 44' (goal) 90+3'	Stadium: Central Stadium; Attendance: 0 Referee: Anatolyi Vishnichenko
Note: Match played at the Jas Qyran Stadium in Almaty, instead of Okzhetpes's regular Okzhetpes Stadium in Kokshetau. Match played behind closed doors due to the COVID-19 pandemic.

==== League table ====
Pos	Team	Pld	W	D	L	GF	GA	GD	Pts	Qualification or relegation
8	Taraz	20	5	8	7	19	23	−4	23	
9	Kyzylzhar	20	6	5	9	15	24	−9	23	
10	Caspiy	20	5	2	13	15	34	−19	17	
11	Okzhetpes (R)	20	2	5	13	16	38	−22	11	Relegation to the Kazakhstan First Division
12	Irtysh Pavlodar (D, R)	0	0	0	0	0	0	0	0	Withdrawn, relegated to the Kazakhstan First Division

Source: UEFA, Soccerway
Rules for classification: 1) Points; 2) Goal difference; 3) Matches won; 4) Goals scored; 5) Away goals scored; 6) Head-to-head points; 7) Head-to-head matches won; 8) Head-to-head goal difference; 9) Head-to-head goals scored; 10) Head-to-head away goals scored; 11) Draw.
(D) Disqualified; (R) Relegated

=== Kazakhstan Cup ===
July 2020 Last 16	–
(UTC+6)

== Squad statistics ==
As of match played 30 November 2020

=== Appearances and goals ===
No.	Pos	Nat	Player	Total		Premier League		Kazakhstan Cup	
No.	Pos	Nat	Player	Apps	Goals	Apps	Goals	Apps	Goals
1	GK	(Russia) RUS	Aleksandr Sheplyakov	5	0	5	0	0	0
3	DF	(Kazakhstan) KAZ	Talgat Kusyapov	3	0	1+2	0	0	0
4	DF	(Belarus) BLR	Alyaksey Hawrylovich	15	0	14+1	0	0	0
5	DF	(Russia) RUS	Daniil Chertov	7	0	3+4	0	0	0
6	MF	(Kazakhstan) KAZ	Miras Tuliev	12	0	8+4	0	0	0
7	DF	(Nigeria) NGR	Aliyu Abubakar	11	0	11	0	0	0
8	MF	(Estonia) EST	Artjom Dmitrijev	16	5	13+3	5	0	0
9	FW	(Russia) RUS	Islamnur Abdulavov	10	0	4+6	0	0	0
10	MF	(Kazakhstan) KAZ	Altynbek Saparov	9	0	3+6	0	0	0
11	MF	(Russia) RUS	Magomed-Emi Dzhabrailov	6	0	3+3	0	0	0
14	DF	(Ukraine) UKR	Taras Bondarenko	16	2	16	2	0	0
15	DF	(Kazakhstan) KAZ	Dmitry Shmidt	11	0	11	0	0	0
17	FW	(Kazakhstan) KAZ	Zhasulan Moldakaraev	17	1	14+3	1	0	0
18	DF	(Kazakhstan) KAZ	Timur Zhakupov	12	0	4+8	0	0	0
19	MF	(Kazakhstan) KAZ	Azat Ersalimov	9	0	7+2	0	0	0
21	DF	(Bulgaria) BUL	Plamen Dimov	18	1	17+1	1	0	0
24	MF	(Serbia) SRB	Milan Stojanović	17	1	13+4	1	0	0
28	MF	(Montenegro) MNE	Darko Zorić	12	2	10+2	2	0	0
30	FW	(Kazakhstan) KAZ	Sanat Zhumakhanov	17	1	12+5	1	0	0
31	GK	(Kazakhstan) KAZ	Ruslan Abzhanov	7	0	7	0	0	0
35	GK	(Kazakhstan) KAZ	Yaroslav Baginsky	8	0	8	0	0	0
69	FW	(Kazakhstan) KAZ	Arman Tolegenov	3	0	2+1	0	0	0
77	MF	(Kazakhstan) KAZ	Ilya Kalinin	3	0	3	0	0	0
88	MF	(Brazil) BRA	Gian	19	1	19	1	0	0
91	FW	(Montenegro) MNE	Marko Obradović	10	2	7+3	2	0	0
99	MF	(Moldova) MDA	Vsevolod Nihaev	6	0	2+4	0	0	0
	DF	(Kazakhstan) KAZ	Niyaz Idrisov	1	0	0+1	0	0	0
Players away from Okzhetpes on loan:
Players who left Okzhetpes during the season:
22	DF	(Ukraine) UKR	Andriy Mischenko	3	0	3	0	0	0

=== Goal scorers ===
Place	Position	Nation	Number	Name	Premier League	Kazakhstan Cup	Total
1	MF	(Estonia)	8	Artjom Dmitrijev	5	0	5
2	FW	(Montenegro)	91	Marko Obradović	2	0	2
2	MF	(Montenegro)	28	Darko Zorić	2	0	2
2	DF	(Ukraine)	14	Taras Bondarenko	2	0	2
5	FW	(Kazakhstan)	17	Zhasulan Moldakaraev	1	0	1
5	FW	(Kazakhstan)	30	Sanat Zhumakhanov	1	0	1
5	MF	(Brazil)	88	Gian	1	0	1
5	DF	(Bulgaria)	21	Plamen Dimov	1	0	1
5	MF	(Serbia)	24	Milan Stojanović	1	0	1
				TOTALS	16	0	16

=== Clean sheet ===
Place	Position	Nation	Number	Name	Premier League	Kazakhstan Cup	Total
1	GK	(Kazakhstan)	35	Yaroslav Baginsky	1	0	1
1	GK	(Russia)	1	Aleksandr Sheplyakov	1	0	1
				TOTALS	2	0	2

=== Disciplinary record ===
Number	Nation	Position	Name	Premier League		Kazakhstan Cup		Total	
Number	Nation	Position	Name	Yellow card	Red card	Yellow card	Red card	Yellow card	Red card
4	(Belarus)	DF	Alyaksey Hawrylovich	4	1	0	0	4	1
5	(Russia)	DF	Daniil Chertov	2	0	0	0	2	0
6	(Kazakhstan)	MF	Miras Tuliev	3	0	0	0	3	0
7	(Nigeria)	DF	Aliyu Abubakar	1	1	0	0	1	1
8	(Estonia)	MF	Artjom Dmitrijev	4	0	0	0	4	0
10	(Kazakhstan)	MF	Altynbek Saparov	2	0	0	0	2	0
11	(Russia)	MF	Magomed-Emi Dzhabrailov	1	0	0	0	1	0
15	(Kazakhstan)	DF	Dmitry Shmidt	2	0	0	0	2	0
17	(Kazakhstan)	FW	Zhasulan Moldakaraev	3	0	0	0	3	0
18	(Kazakhstan)	DF	Timur Zhakupov	3	0	0	0	3	0
21	(Bulgaria)	DF	Plamen Dimov	5	0	0	0	5	0
24	(Serbia)	MF	Milan Stojanović	2	0	0	0	2	0
28	(Montenegro)	MF	Darko Zorić	1	0	0	0	1	0
30	(Kazakhstan)	FW	Sanat Zhumakhanov	7	1	0	0	7	1
31	(Kazakhstan)	GK	Ruslan Abzhanov	2	0	0	0	2	0
88	(Brazil)	MF	Gian	4	0	0	0	4	0
91	(Montenegro)	FW	Marko Obradović	4	0	0	0	4	0
	(Kazakhstan)	DF	Niyaz Idrisov	1	0	0	0	1	0
Players who left Okzhetpes during the season:
22	(Ukraine)	DF	Andriy Mischenko	0	1	0	0	0	1
			TOTALS	51	4	0	0	51	4
