= Ayub Batsuyev =

Russian footballer

Personal information
- Full name: Ayub Said-Khasanovich Batsuyev
- Date of birth: 9 February 1997 (age 29)
- Place of birth: Argun, Russia
- Height: 1.69 m (5 ft 7 in)
- Position: Midfielder

Team information
- Current team: Shakhtyor Donetsk
- Number: 95

Senior career*
Years	Team	Apps	(Gls)
2013–2019	Akhmat Grozny	6	(0)
2019	→ Chayka Peschanokopskoye (loan)	8	(0)
2019	→ Inter Cherkessk (loan)	9	(4)
2020	Taraz	7	(1)
2021	Noah Jūrmala		
2021–2023	Veles Moscow	54	(6)
2023	Leon Saturn Ramenskoye	6	(1)
2024	Kyrgyzaltyn	4	(0)
2025	Nart Cherkessk	29	(6)
2026–	hakhtyor Donetsk	13	(1)
- * Club domestic league appearances and goals as of 31 October 2026

Ayub Said-Khasanovich Batsuyev (Russian: Аюб Саид-Хасанович Бацуев; born 9 February 1997) is a Russian football player who plays as central midfielder for Shakhtyor Donetsk.

== Club career ==
He made his professional debut in the Russian Professional Football League for Terek-2 Grozny on 24 May 2016 in a game against Spartak Nalchik.

He has been on the roster of Akhmat Grozny since 2013, and, after scoring 3 goals in the first 2 games of the 2017–18 youth championship, made his debut in the Russian Premier League for the club on 29 July 2017 in a game against Dynamo Moscow.

On 16 January 2019, he joined Chayka Peschanokopskoye on loan until the end of the 2018–19 season.

On 29 January 2020, he signed with Kazakhstan Premier League club Taraz.

== Career statistics ==
=== Club ===
As of match played 30 November 2020

Club	Season	League			Cup		Continental		Total	
Club	Season	Division	Apps	Goals	Apps	Goals	Apps	Goals	Apps	Goals
Akhmat Grozny	2013–14	RPL	0	0	0	0	–		0	0
Akhmat Grozny	2014–15	RPL	0	0	0	0	–		0	0
Akhmat Grozny	2015–16	RPL	0	0	0	0	–		0	0
Akhmat Grozny	2016–17	RPL	0	0	0	0	–		0	0
Akhmat Grozny	2017–18	RPL	6	0	0	0	–		6	0
Akhmat Grozny	2018–19	RPL	0	0	0	0	–		0	0
Akhmat Grozny	2019–20	RPL	0	0	0	0	–		0	0
Akhmat Grozny	Total		6	0	0	0	0	0	6	0
Terek-2 Grozny	2015–16	PFL	2	0	–		–		2	0
Chayka Peschanokopskoye (loan)	2018–19	PFL	8	0	0	0	–		8	0
Inter Cherkessk (loan)	2019–20	PFL	9	4	0	0	–		9	4
Taraz	2020	KPL	7	1	0	0	–		7	1
Career total			32	5	0	0	0	0	32	5
