= Andriy Mishchenko =

Ukrainian footballer (born 1991)

Andriy Mishchenko Андрій Міщенко
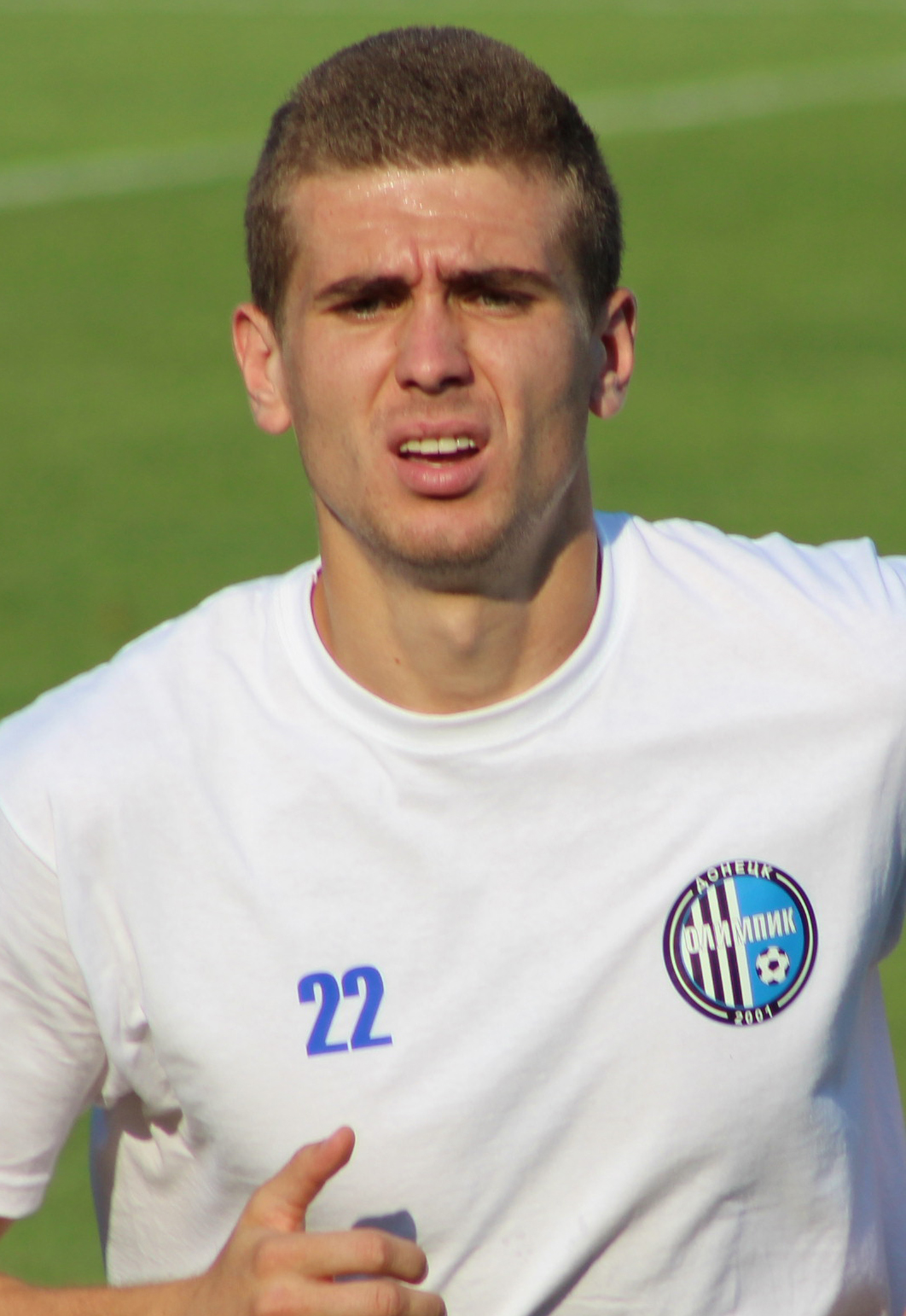

Personal information
- Full name: Andriy Petrovych Mishchenko
- Date of birth: 7 April 1991 (age 35)
- Place of birth: Butenky, Poltava Oblast, Ukrainian SSR
- Height: 1.93 m (6 ft 4 in)
- Position: Defender

Team information
- Current team: Dordoi Bishkek

Youth career
- Youth Sportive School Molod'

Senior career*
Years	Team	Apps	(Gls)
2008–2011	FC Kolos Kobelyaky	?	(?)
2011–2012	Hirnyk-Sport Komsomolsk	27	(5)
2012–2013	Stal Alchevsk	50	(2)
2014	Sevastopol	2	(0)
2014–2015	Olimpik Donetsk	15	(0)
2015–2016	Maccabi Netanya	27	(2)
2016–2017	Hapoel Ashkelon	16	(0)
2018	Olimpik Donetsk	3	(0)
2018–2019	Chornomorets Odesa	12	(0)
2019	SKA-Khabarovsk	15	(0)
2020	Okzhetpes	3	(0)
2021	Istiklol	19	(1)
2022	AGMK	8	(0)
2022–2023	Neftchi Fergana	13	(0)
2023–	Dordoi Bishkek	0	(0)
- * Club domestic league appearances and goals as of 14:26, 31 July 2023 (UTC)

Andriy Mishchenko (Ukrainian: Андрій Петрович Міщенко; born 7 April 1991) is a Ukrainian professional footballer who plays as a defender for Dordoi Bishkek.

== Career ==
He is a product of Youth Sportive School Molod' Poltava.

In March 2014, he signed a contract with the Ukrainian Premier League club Sevastopol.

On 20 February 2020, FC Okzhetpes announced the signing of Mishchenko. On 27 July 2020, Mishchenko left Okzhetpes by mutual consent.

In March 2021, Mishchenko joined FC Istiklol on trial, signing a one-year contract with the club on 29 March 2021.

== Career statistics ==
=== Club ===
As of match played 21 April 2023

Club	Season	League			National Cup		Continental		Other		Total	
Club	Season	Division	Apps	Goals	Apps	Goals	Apps	Goals	Apps	Goals	Apps	Goals
Stal Alchevsk	2012–13	Ukrainian First League	33	2	2	0	-		-		35	2
Stal Alchevsk	2013–14	Ukrainian First League	17	0	1	0	-		-		18	0
Stal Alchevsk	Total		50	2	3	0	-	-	-	-	53	2
Sevastopol	2013–14	Ukrainian Premier League	2	0	0	0	-		-		2	0
Olimpik Donetsk	2014–15	Ukrainian Premier League	15	0	6	0	-		-		21	0
Maccabi Netanya	2015–16	Israeli Premier League	27	2	0	0	-		6 (Note: Appearance in the Toto Cup)	0	33	2
Hapoel Ashkelon	2016–17	Israeli Premier League	16	0	0	0	-		1	0	17	0
Olimpik Donetsk	2017–18	Ukrainian Premier League	3	0	0	0	-		-		3	0
Chornomorets Odesa	2018–19	Ukrainian Premier League	12	0	1	0	-		-		13	0
SKA-Khabarovsk	2019–20	Russian FNL	15	0	1	0	-		-		16	0
Okzhetpes	2020	Kazakhstan Premier League	3	0	0	0	-		-		3	0
Istiklol	2021	Tajikistan Higher League	19	1	2	1	6 (Note: Appearances in the AFC Champions League)	0	1 (Note: Appearance in the Tajik Supercup)	0	28	2
AGMK	2022	Uzbekistan Super League	8	0	2	0	-		-		10	0
Neftchi Fergana	2022	Uzbekistan Super League	10	0	0	0	-		-		10	0
Neftchi Fergana	2023	Uzbekistan Super League	3	0	0	0	-		-		3	0
Neftchi Fergana	Total		13	0	0	0	-	-	-	-	13	0
Career total			183	5	15	1	6	0	8	0	212	6

== Honors ==
Istiklol

- Tajik Supercup: 2021
- Tajikistan Higher League: 2021
