= Magomed-Emi Dzhabrailov =

Russian footballer (born 1993)

Personal information
- Full name: Magomed-Emi Said-Emiyevich Dzhabrailov
- Date of birth: 24 March 1993 (age 33)
- Place of birth: Alyutovo, Pronsky District, Ryazan Oblast, Russia
- Height: 1.77 m (5 ft 10 in)
- Position: Midfielder

Youth career
- –2009: O.G.C.Nice
- 2009–2010: O.G.C.Nice
- 2010: Nice
- 2011–2013: Espanyol

Senior career*
Years	Team	Apps	(Gls)
2013–2014	Marbella	4	(12)
2014	Ronda	5	(12)
2015	Stumbras	27	(2)
2016–2017	Terek Grozny	0	(4)
2017	Austria Klagenfurt	7	(7)
2018–2019	Jonava	10	(7)
2019	Fakel Voronezh	6	(0)
2020	Okzhetpes	6	(0)
- * Club domestic league appearances and goals

Magomed-Emi Said-Emiyevich Dzhabrailov (Russian: Магомед-Эми Саид-Эмиевич Джабраилов; born 24 March 1993) is a Russian former football player. He also holds French citizenship and was registered to play in Russian leagues as a foreign player.

== Club career ==
Dzhabrailov made his debut in the Russian Football National League for FC Fakel Voronezh on 3 March 2019 in a game against FC Khimki, as an 87th minute substitute for Ivan Oleynikov.

In October 2020, Dzhabrailov signed for Kazakhstan Premier League club FC Okzhetpes.
