= Nils Zatl =

Austrian footballer

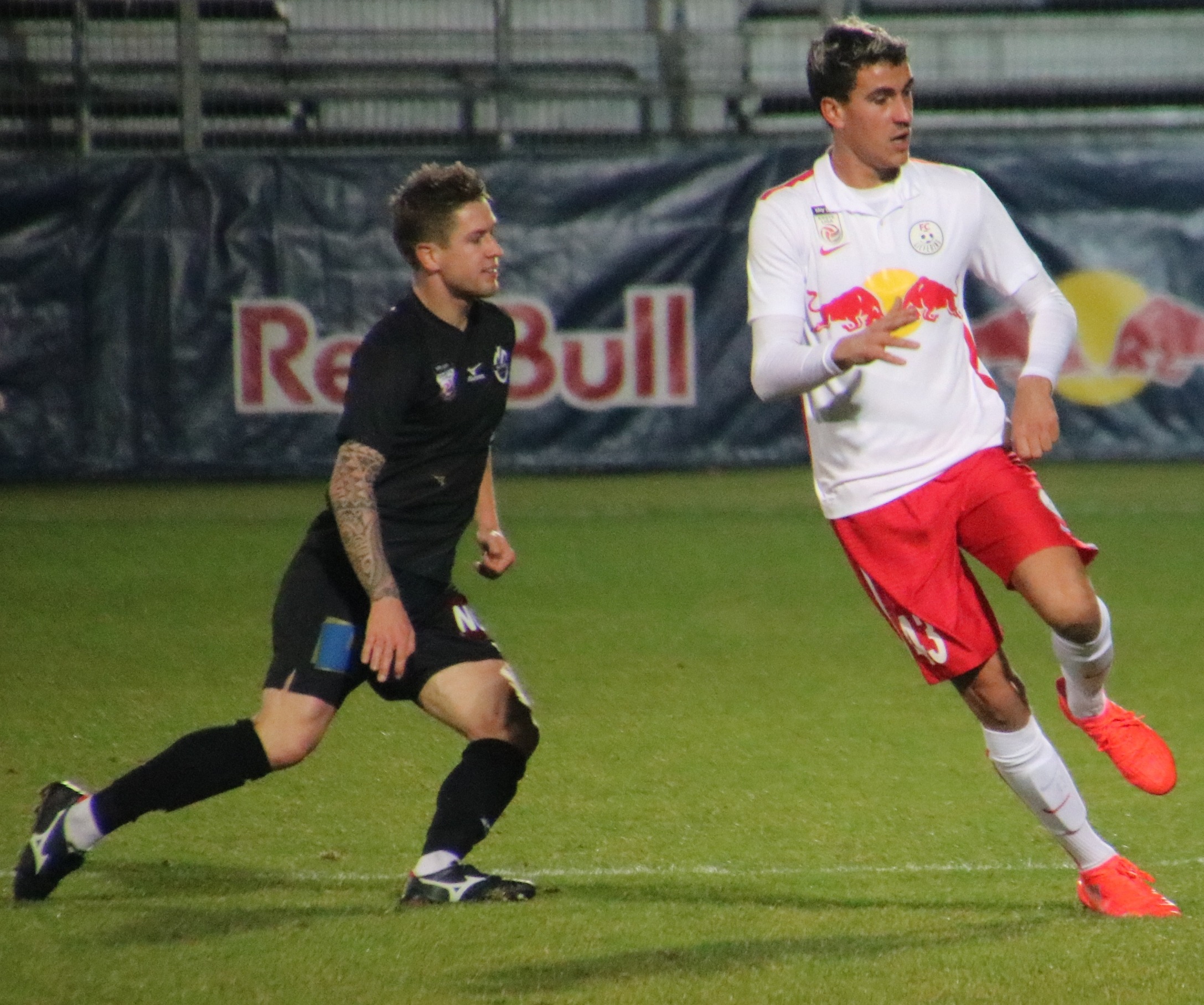
- Zatl (left) in 2016, playing for SV Horn

Personal information
- Date of birth: 3 April 1992 (age 34)
- Place of birth: Kirchdorf an der Krems, Austria
- Height: 1.78 m (5 ft 10 in)
- Position: Second striker

Team information
- Current team: Wiener Sport-Club
- Number: 24

Senior career*
Years	Team	Apps	(Gls)
2010–2012	ATSV Sattledt	45	(3)
2012–2013	Wels	23	(2)
2013–2014	Union St. Florian	41	(12)
2014–2016	Ritzing	24	(9)
2016–2017	Horn	38	(12)
2017–2019	Doxa Katokopias	61	(10)
2020	Taraz	2	(1)
2020–2021	Floridsdorfer AC	14	(3)
2022–2024	First Vienna	26	(10)
2025	SC Wiener Viktoria	3	(0)
2025–	Wiener Sport-Club	15	(4)
- * Club domestic league appearances and goals as of 26 November 2023

Nils Zatl (born 3 April 1992) is an Austrian footballer who plays as a second striker for Wiener Sport-Club.

== Career ==
=== Club ===
On 10 February 2020, FC Taraz announced the signing of Zatl.

On 20 August 2020, he joined Floridsdorfer AC. He left the club again at the end of the season.
