= Vladislav Sirotov =

Russian footballer

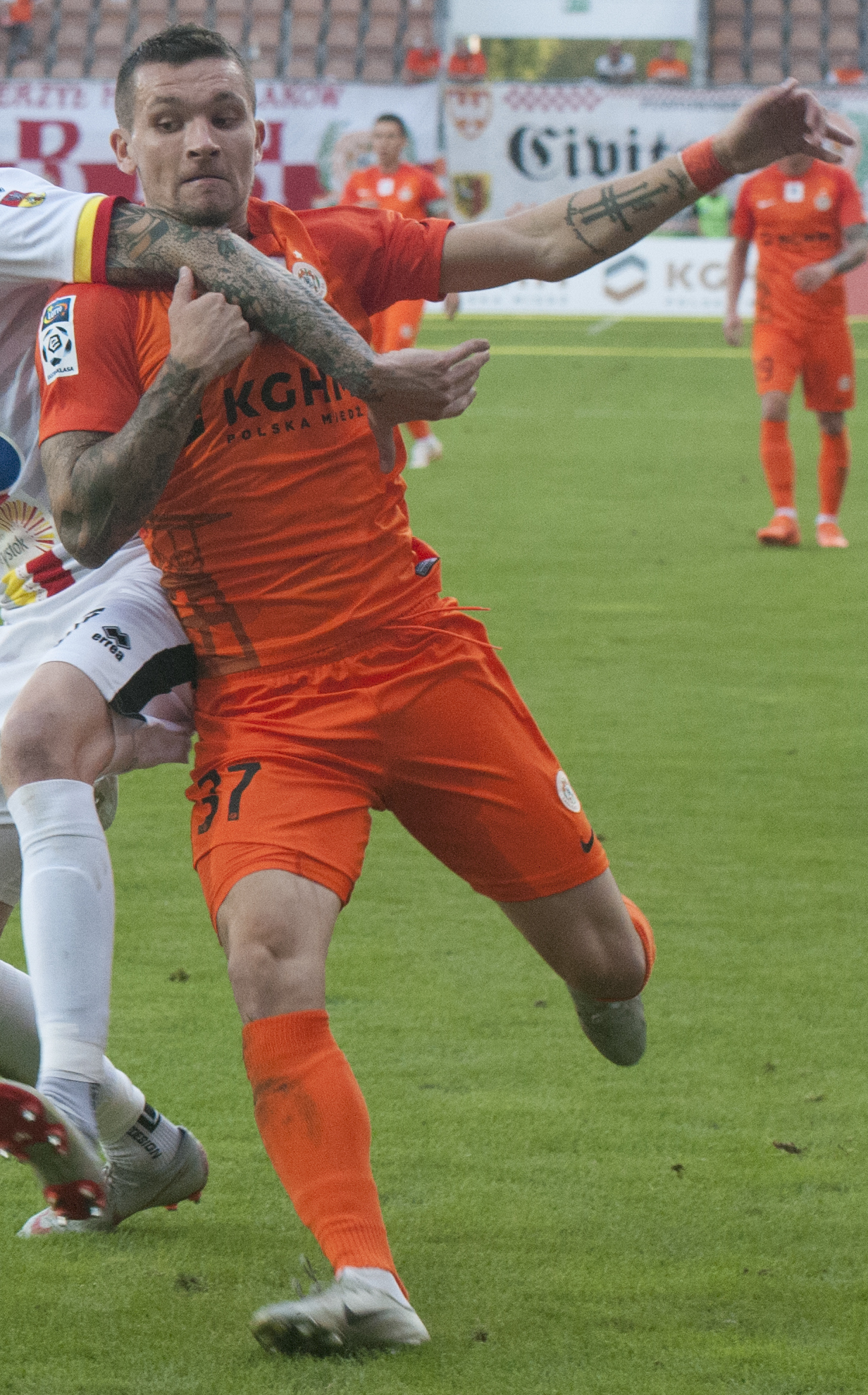
- Sirotov with Zagłębie Lubin in 2018

Personal information
- Full name: Vladislav Vladimirovich Sirotov
- Date of birth: 27 October 1991 (age 35)
- Place of birth: Staroshcherbinovskaya, Krasnodar Krai, Russia
- Height: 1.79 m (5 ft 10 in)
- Positions: Left winger; forward

Team information
- Current team: Torpedo Vladimir
- Number: 37

Senior career*
Years	Team	Apps	(Gls)
2009	Smena-Zenit Saint Petersburg	34	(2)
2010–2012	Zenit Saint Petersburg	0	(0)
2013	Chernomorets-d Novorossiysk	6	(2)
2013–2014	Tosno	4	(0)
2014	Znamya Truda Orekhovo-Zuyevo	19	(1)
2015–2017	Shinnik Yaroslavl	46	(4)
2017–2018	Zenit-2 Saint Petersburg	50	(8)
2018–2019	Zagłębie Lubin	10	(0)
2018–2019	Zagłębie Lubin II	10	(0)
2019	Tekstilshchik Ivanovo	11	(0)
2020–2021	Caspiy	10	(0)
2021	Noah Jurmala	12	(1)
2021–2023	Leningradets Leningrad Oblast	61	(4)
2025–	Torpedo Vladimir	35	(5)

International career
2010	Russia U19	6	(2)
- * Club domestic league appearances and goals as of 1 November 2026

Vladislav Vladimirovich Sirotov (Russian: Владислав Владимирович Сиротов; born 27 October 1991) is a Russian professional footballer who plays for Torpedo Vladimir.

== Club career ==
He made his Russian Football National League debut for FC Shinnik Yaroslavl on 11 July 2015 in a game against FC Baltika Kaliningrad.
