= Goran Brkić =

Serbian footballer

Personal information
- Full name: Goran Brkić
- Date of birth: 28 April 1991 (age 35)
- Place of birth: Pančevo, SFR Yugoslavia
- Height: 1.76 m (5 ft 9 1/2 in)
- Position: Midfielder

Team information
- Current team: Železničar Pančevo
- Number: 40

Youth career
- OFK Beograd

Senior career*
Years	Team	Apps	(Gls)
2008–2013	OFK Beograd	22	(2)
2008–2009	→ Palilulac Beograd (loan)	9	(1)
2009–2010	→ Mladost Apatin (loan)	24	(3)
2012	→ Kolubara (loan)	14	(0)
2013	→ Jedinstvo Užice (loan)	8	(1)
2013–2015	Metalac Gornji Milanovac	55	(6)
2016	Zemun	13	(4)
2016–2017	Mladost Doboj Kakanj	29	(10)
2017–2020	Olimpija Ljubljana	22	(5)
2019	→ Triglav Kranj (loan)	10	(1)
2020	Taraz	18	(1)
2021	Tuzla City	17	(4)
2022	Borac Banja Luka	5	(0)
2022–2023	Železničar Pančevo	17	(0)

International career
- Serbia U17
2009	Serbia U19	2	(1)
- * Club domestic league appearances and goals as of 30 May 2023

Goran Brkić (Serbian Cyrillic: Горан Бркић; born 28 April 1991) is a Serbian professional footballer who plays as a midfielder for Železničar Pančevo.

== Club career ==
Brkić was born in Pančevo and started his career at OFK Beograd. In 2008, he was loaned to Palilulac Beograd.

In the next season, he was loaned again, but this time to the second division club Mladost Apatin. During the 2010–11 season, Brkić was a member of the OFK Beograd first team squad, but lacked playing time, so in the spring of 2011, he was loaned again to Kolubara, with whom he successfully battled relegation in the Serbian First League. Brkić later moved from OFK Beograd to Metalac Gornji Milanovac. He was a member of the team that won a place in the Serbian SuperLiga, contributing a goal in the play-off match against Napredak Kruševac. On 24 February 2020, Kazakhstan Premier League club Taraz announced the signing of Brkić.

On 18 January 2021, he signed a one-year contract with Bosnian Premier League club Tuzla City. Brkić scored his first goal for Tuzla in his debut against city rivals Sloboda in a league game on 28 February 2021.

== International career ==
Brkić was a member of Serbian youth national teams, and played at the 2008 UEFA European Under-17 Championship.

== Honours ==
Olimpija Ljubljana

- Slovenian PrvaLiga: 2017–18
- Slovenian Cup: 2017–18, 2018–19
