= Maksym Marusych =

Ukrainian footballer

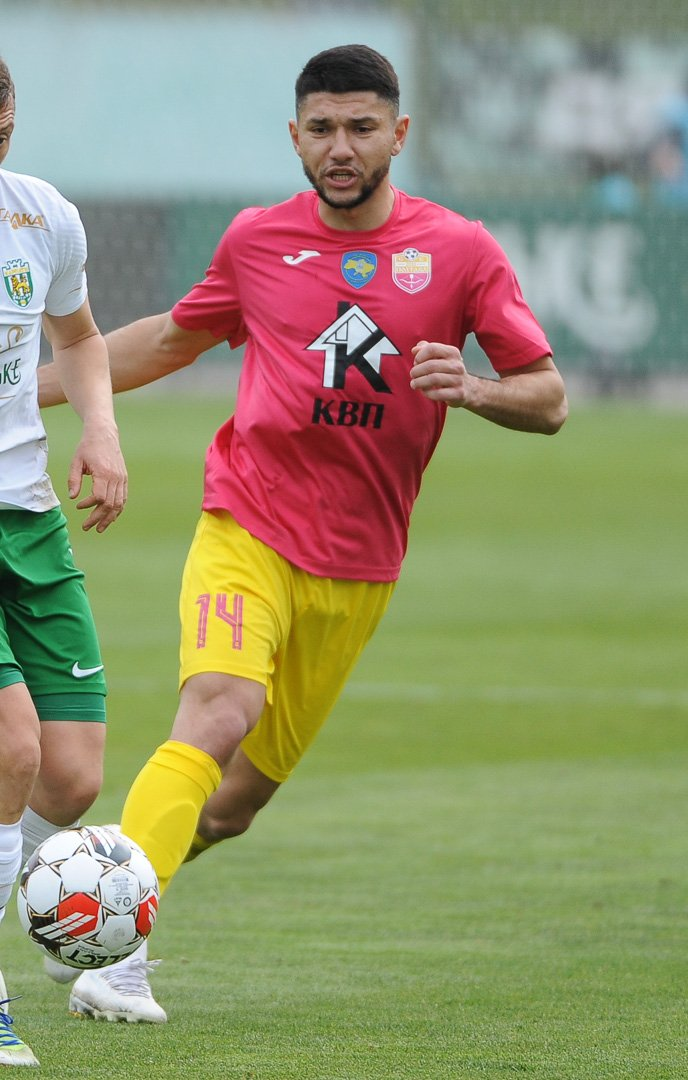

Personal information
- Full name: Maksym Vyacheslavovych Marusych
- Date of birth: 17 July 1993 (age 33)
- Place of birth: Poltava, Ukraine
- Height: 1.82 m (6 ft 0 in)
- Position: Midfielder

Team information
- Current team: Poltava
- Number: 14

Youth career
- 2006–2011: Vorskla Poltava

Senior career*
| Years | Team | Apps | (Gls) |
| 2011–2014 | Vorskla Poltava | 0 | (0) |
| 2014 | Karpaty Lviv | 2 | (0) |
| 2015 | Hirnyk-Sport Komsomolsk | 26 | (4) |
| 2016 | Desna Chernihiv | 3 | (0) |
| 2016 | Hirnyk-Sport Horishni Plavni | 17 | (6) |
| 2017 | Jonava | 32 | (8) |
| 2018–2019 | RFS | 34 | (15) |
| 2019 | Jelgava | 8 | (4) |
| 2020 | Caspiy | 10 | (1) |
| 2021 | Noah Jūrmala | 0 | (0) |
| 2021 | KLF Poltava | 6 | (12) |
| 2021 | Riteriai | 18 | (3) |
| 2022–2023 | Inhulets Petrove | 25 | (2) |
| 2023 | Veres Rivne | 13 | (0) |
| 2024– | Poltava | 52 | (9) |

International career
| 2008 | Ukraine U16 | 1 | (0) |
| 2014 | Ukraine U21 | 2 | (0) |
- * Club domestic league appearances and goals as of 3 June 2026

Maksym Vyacheslavovych Marusych (Ukrainian: Максим В′ячеславович Марусич; born 17 July 1993) is a Ukrainian professional footballer who plays as a midfielder for Poltava.

== Career ==
Marusych is the product of the FC Vorskla Youth School System. But in July 2014 he signed 4,5 years deal with another Ukrainian Premier League club Karpaty. He made his debut for FC Karpaty entering as a second-half substitute against FC Hoverla Uzhhorod on 27 July 2014 in Ukrainian Premier League. But on 31 August 2014 the contract with Marusych was terminated.

=== Desna Chernihiv ===
In 2016 he signed for Desna Chernihiv.

On 1 March 2017, Maksym was announced as a member of Lithuanian A Lyga side Jonava.

In August 2019, Maksym joined FK Jelgava. He was released by the end of 2019.

=== FK Riteriai ===
On 2 July 2021 signed with Riteriai.

== Honours ==
RFS

- Latvian Cup: 2019, 2021
