= Valery Karshakevich =

Belarusian footballer

Personal information
- Date of birth: 15 February 1988 (age 38)
- Place of birth: Maryina Horka, Minsk Oblast
- Height: 1.92 m (6 ft 3 1/2 in)
- Position: Defender

Team information
- Current team: Yelimay (assistant coach)

Youth career
- 2005–2007: Shakhtyor Soligorsk

Senior career*
Years	Team	Apps	(Gls)
2005	Molodechno	10	(0)
2006–2007	Shakhtyor Soligorsk	0	(0)
2008	Naftan Novopolotsk	0	(0)
2009–2013	Torpedo-BelAZ Zhodino	78	(3)
2013	Dinamo Brest	13	(0)
2014	Belshina Bobruisk	27	(2)
2015	Granit Mikashevichi	21	(1)
2016	Torpedo-BelAZ Zhodino	20	(1)
2017	Slutsk	30	(0)
2018	Gomel	16	(0)
2018	Smolevichi	12	(3)
2019	Dnyapro Mogilev	8	(0)
2019	Mordovia Saransk	0	(0)
2020	Taraz	20	(1)
2021–2022	Kyzylzhar	48	(5)
2023	Yelimay	26	(1)

International career
2008	Belarus U21	1	(0)

Managerial career
- 2024–: Yelimay (assistant)
- * Club domestic league appearances and goals

Valery Karshakevich (Belarusian: Валерый Каршакевіч; Russian: Валерий Каршакевич; born 15 February 1988) is a Belarusian professional football coach and a former player. He is an assistant coach in Kazakhstan for Yelimay.

== Club career ==
On 29 January 2020 he joined Kazakhstan Premier League club FC Taraz.

== Honours ==
Torpedo-BelAZ Zhodino

- Belarusian Cup: 2015–16
