= Billal Sebaihi =

French footballer (born 1992)

Personal information
- Full name: Billal Sebaihi
- Date of birth: 31 May 1992 (age 34)
- Place of birth: Lyon, France
- Height: 1.79 m (5 ft 10 in)
- Position: Midfielder

Youth career
- –2010: Saint-Étienne

Senior career*
Years	Team	Apps	(Gls)
2010–2012	Saint-Étienne B	25	(2)
2013	CS Constantine	1	(0)
2013	→ USM El Harrach (loan)	10	(1)
2014	Anadia	10	(4)
2014–2015	Beira-Mar	24	(7)
2015–2017	Estoril	7	(0)
2016	→ Tondela (loan)	0	(0)
2017–2018	Manisaspor	35	(4)
2018–2019	Boluspor	23	(0)
2020–2021	Caspiy	18	(4)
2021	Hermannstadt	10	(0)
2022	Maktaaral	17	(5)
2023	Žalgiris	6	(1)
2023	Maktaaral	6	(1)
- * Club domestic league appearances and goals as of 23 November 2023

Billal Sebaihi (born 31 May 1992) is a French professional footballer who plays as a midfielder.

== Career ==
In July 2015, he left Beira-Mar and moved to Primeira Liga club Estoril. He signed for a 3-year contract keeping him with the club till 2018 and a buyout clause of €3 million.

On 16 January 2020, Sebaihi joined Kazakhstan Premier League club FC Kaisar on trial in Turkey.

On 18 January 2023, Žalgiris announced the signing of Sebaihi.
